= Bermuda national football team results (2000–2009) =

This article provides details of international football games played by the Bermuda national football team from 2000 to 2009.

== Results ==
Win Draw Loss

=== 2000 ===
11 January Friendly	Bermuda	0–2	Canada	Devonshire Parish, Bermuda
		Report	25', 30' Nash	Stadium: Bermuda National Stadium; Attendance: 1,400; Referee: Stuart Crockwith

5 March 2002 FIFA World Cup qualification	British Virgin Islands	1–5	Bermuda	Tortola, British Virgin Islands
	Williams 61'	Report	20' Lightbourne; 22' Cann; 35', 48', 65' Goater	Stadium: Shirley Recreational Field; Attendance: 400; Referee: Caudel McNab (Bahamas)

19 March 2002 FIFA World Cup qualification	Bermuda	9–0	British Virgin Islands	Devonshire Parish, Bermuda
	Boyles 6'; Russell 34'; Wade 53'; Burgess 57' (pen.); Lewis 60'; Astwood 61', 79'; Nusum 75', 89'	Report		Stadium: Bermuda National Stadium; Attendance: 1,200; Referee: Rosnick Grant (Haiti)

16 April 2002 FIFA World Cup qualification	Antigua and Barbuda	0–0	Bermuda	St. John's, Antigua and Barbuda
		Report		Stadium: Antigua Recreation Ground; Attendance: 1,040; Referee: Martin Charles (Dominica)

21 April 2002 FIFA World Cup qualification	Bermuda	1–1	Antigua and Barbuda	Devonshire Parish, Bermuda
	Burgess 51'	Report	73' Edwards	Stadium: Bermuda National Stadium; Attendance: 2,000; Referee: Alexander Williams (Saint Lucia)

=== 2001 ===
23 June Friendly	Bermuda	0–5	Trinidad and Tobago	Devonshire Parish, Bermuda
		Report	23' Yorke; 44' Pierre; 63' Eve; 86', 90' John	Stadium: Bermuda National Stadium; Attendance: 3,000

=== 2003 ===
26 December Friendly	Bermuda	1–2	Barbados	Devonshire Parish, Bermuda
	Nusum 79'	Report	39', 43' Lowell	Stadium: Bermuda National Stadium; Referee: Anthony Mouchette (Bermuda)

=== 2004 ===
1 January Friendly	Bermuda	0–4	Barbados	Devonshire Parish, Bermuda
		Report	6' Parris; 51' Riley; 74', 76' Goodridge	Stadium: Bermuda National Stadium; Referee: Lyndon Raynor (Bermuda)

10 February Friendly	Bermuda	0–1	Trinidad and Tobago	Devonshire Parish, Bermuda
		Report	64' Glenn	Stadium: Bermuda National Stadium; Attendance: 3,000; Referee: Lyndon Raynor (Bermuda)

12 February Friendly	Bermuda	2–2	Trinidad and Tobago	Devonshire Parish, Bermuda
	Ca. Smith 36'; Simons 76'	Report	37' Co. Smith; 75' Glenn	Stadium: Bermuda National Stadium; Referee: Stuart Crockwell (Bermuda)

29 February 2006 FIFA World Cup qualification	Bermuda	13–0	Montserrat	Devonshire Parish, Bermuda
	Ming 5', 20', 50'; Nusum 15', 54', 60'; Smith 36'; Bean 41', 52'; Steede 43'; Wade 77'; Simons 83'; Burgess 87'	Report		Stadium: Bermuda National Stadium; Attendance: 3,000; Referee: Michael Kennedy (United States)

21 March 2006 FIFA World Cup qualification	Montserrat	0–7	Bermuda	Lookout, Montserrat, Montserrat
		Report	15' Hill; 21', 44' Nusum; 29' Bean; 45', 46' Smith; 76' Ming	Stadium: Blakes Estate Stadium; Attendance: 250; Referee: Martin Charles (Dominica)

31 March Friendly	Bermuda	3–0	Nicaragua	Devonshire Parish, Bermuda
	Goater 33', 65' (pen.); Simons 90'	Report		Stadium: Bermuda National Stadium; Attendance: 6,000; Referee: Stuart Crockwell (Bermuda)

2 April Friendly	Bermuda	2–1	Nicaragua	Devonshire Parish, Bermuda
	Nusum 47', 67'	Report	72' (pen.) Palacios	Stadium: Bermuda National Stadium; Referee: Lyndon Raynor (Bermuda)

28 April Friendly	Panama	4–1	Bermuda	Panama City, Panama
	Phillips 25', 90'; Valdéz 66'; Tejada 68'	Report	14' Astwood	Stadium: Estadio Rommel Fernández; Attendance: 2,000; Referee: Lyndon Raynor (Bermuda)

30 April Friendly	Nicaragua	2–0	Bermuda	Diriamba, Nicaragua
	Solórzano 4'; Palacios 30'	Report		Stadium: Estadio Cacique Diriangén; Attendance: 800

2 May Friendly	Nicaragua	2–0	Bermuda	Estelí, Nicaragua
	Rocha 8'; Palacios 46'	Report		Stadium: Estadio Independencia; Attendance: 4,000; Referee: William Reyes (Nicaragua)

13 June 2006 FIFA World Cup qualification	El Salvador	2–1	Bermuda	San Salvador, El Salvador
	Martínez 14'; Velásquez 54'	Report	30' Nusum	Stadium: Estadio Cuscatlán; Attendance: 12,000; Referee: Donald Campos (Nicaragua)

20 June 2006 FIFA World Cup qualification	Bermuda	2–2	El Salvador	Devonshire Parish, Bermuda
	Burgess 4' (pen.); Nusum 21'	Report	20', 41' (pen.) Pacheco	Stadium: Bermuda National Stadium; Attendance: 4,000; Referee: Alfredo Whittaker (Cayman Islands)

24 November 2005 Caribbean Cup qualification	Bermuda	2–1	Cayman Islands	Arnos Vale, St. Vincent and the Grenadines
	Smith 4'; Hill 34'	Report	48' Berry	Stadium: Arnos Vale Stadium; Attendance: 200; Referee: James Mathews (St. Kitts and Nevis)

26 November 2005 Caribbean Cup qualification	Saint Vincent and the Grenadines	3–3	Bermuda	Arnos Vale, St. Vincent and the Grenadines
	Pierre 7'; Haynes 52'; Ming 90' (pen.)	Report	42' Smith; 82' Lowe; 42' Smith	Stadium: Arnos Vale Stadium

28 November 2005 Caribbean Cup qualification	British Virgin Islands	2–0	Bermuda	Arnos Vale, St. Vincent and the Grenadines
	James 12', 24'	Report		Stadium: Arnos Vale Stadium; Attendance: 400; Referee: James Mathews (St. Kitts and Nevis)

=== 2005 ===
25 May Friendly	Trinidad and Tobago	4–0	Bermuda	Port of Spain, Trinidad and Tobago
	Dill 34' (o.g.); Jones 46'; Lawrence 51'; John 85'	Report		Stadium: Hasely Crawford Stadium; Attendance: 3,000

27 May Friendly	Trinidad and Tobago	1–0	Bermuda	Marabella, Trinidad and Tobago
	John 17'	Report		Stadium: Manny Ramjohn Stadium; Attendance: 8,000

=== 2006 ===
27 September 2007 Caribbean Cup qualification	U.S. Virgin Islands	0–6	Bermuda	Saint Thomas, U.S. Virgin Islands
		Report	1', 36' Steede; 31', 54' Coddington; 38' Nusum; 89' Jennings	Stadium: Lionel Roberts Park; Attendance: 150

29 September 2007 Caribbean Cup qualification	Bermuda	3–1	Dominican Republic	Saint Thomas, U.S. Virgin Islands
	Zuill 25'; Cox 48'; Steede 53'	Report	85' Faña	Stadium: Lionel Roberts Park; Attendance: 300

19 November 2007 Caribbean Cup qualification	Bermuda	0–3	Saint Vincent and the Grenadines	Bridgetown, Barbados
		Report	58' James; 68', 77' Samuel	Stadium: Barbados National Stadium; Attendance: 4,500

21 November 2007 Caribbean Cup qualification	Bahamas	0–4	Bermuda	Bridgetown, Barbados
		Report	6', 28' Smith; 11' Nusum; 77' Steede	Stadium: Barbados National Stadium

23 November 2007 Caribbean Cup qualification	Barbados	1–1	Bermuda	Bridgetown, Barbados
	Ifill 4'	Report	42' Nusum	Stadium: Barbados National Stadium; Attendance: 3,300

=== 2007 ===
7 January 2007 Caribbean Cup qualification	Haiti	2–0	Bermuda	Couva, Trinidad and Tobago
	Cadet 9'; Lormera 72'	Report		Stadium: Ato Boldon Stadium

9 January 2007 Caribbean Cup qualification	Bermuda	0–3	Haiti	Couva, Trinidad and Tobago
		Report	25', 90+2' Cadet; 63' Boucicaut	Stadium: Ato Boldon Stadium

25 March Friendly	Bermuda	0–3	Canada	Devonshire Parish, Bermuda
		Report	25' Hutchinson; 30' Radzinski; 44' Stalteri	Stadium: Bermuda National Stadium

14 December Friendly	Bermuda	1–2	Saint Kitts and Nevis	Devonshire Parish, Bermuda
	Davis 86'	Report	25' Francis; 38' Lake	Stadium: Bermuda National Stadium

16 December Friendly	Bermuda	4–2	Saint Kitts and Nevis	Devonshire Parish, Bermuda
	Zuill 3', 40', 83'; DeGraff 44'	Report	44' Ponteen; 68' Charles	Stadium: Bermuda National Stadium; Attendance: 15,000

=== 2008 ===
16 January Friendly	Bermuda	0–2	Puerto Rico	Devonshire Parish, Bermuda
		Report	44' Graham; 67' Cabrero	Stadium: Bermuda National Stadium

18 January Friendly	Bermuda	0–1	Puerto Rico	Devonshire Parish, Bermuda
		Report	13' Delgado	Stadium: Bermuda National Stadium

3 February 2010 FIFA World Cup qualification	Bermuda	1–1	Cayman Islands	Devonshire Parish, Bermuda
15:00 UTC-4	Burgess 18'	Report	87' Grant	Stadium: Bermuda National Stadium; Attendance: 2,000; Referee: Mauricio Navarro (Canada)

30 March 2010 FIFA World Cup qualification	Cayman Islands	1–3	Bermuda	George Town, Cayman Islands
20:00 UTC-5	M. Forbes 63' (pen.)	Report	18', 25' DeGraff; 52' Steede	Stadium: Truman Bodden Stadium; Attendance: 2,000; Referee: Jair Marrufo (United States)

6 June Friendly	Bermuda	2–1	Barbados	Devonshire Parish, Bermuda
	Shakir 41'; Ming 86'	Report	44' Forde	Stadium: Bermuda National Stadium

9 June Friendly	Bermuda	3–0	Barbados	Devonshire Parish, Bermuda
	Bean 12', 18'; Nusum 45'	Report		Stadium: Bermuda National Stadium

15 June 2010 FIFA World Cup qualification	Trinidad and Tobago	1–2	Bermuda	Macoya, Trinidad and Tobago
17:30 UTC−4	John 22'	Report	8', 40' Nusum	Stadium: Marvin Lee Stadium; Attendance: 4,585; Referee: Wálter Quesada (Costa Rica)

22 June 2010 FIFA World Cup qualification	Bermuda	0–2	Trinidad and Tobago	Devonshire Parish, Bermuda
19:30 UTC−3		Report	9' Roberts; 66' John	Stadium: Bermuda National Stadium; Attendance: 5,000; Referee: Carlos Batres (Guatemala)

27 August 2008 Caribbean Cup qualification	Bermuda	0–4	Antigua and Barbuda	George Town, Cayman Islands
		Report	4', 9' (pen.) Thomas; 63' Burton; 79' Challenger	Stadium: Truman Bodden Stadium; Attendance: 300; Referee: Howard Stennett (Jamaica)

30 August 2008 Caribbean Cup qualification	Saint Martin	0–7	Bermuda	George Town, Cayman Islands
		Report	27', 45', 58', 86' Lambe; 29' Ming; 85', 89' Castle	Stadium: Truman Bodden Stadium; Attendance: 350; Referee: Kevin Morrison (Jamaica)

31 August 2008 Caribbean Cup qualification	Cayman Islands	0–0	Bermuda	George Town, Cayman Islands
		Report		Stadium: Truman Bodden Stadium; Attendance: 550; Referee: Geoffrey Hospedales (Trinidad and Tobago)
