= Football at the 2013 Island Games =

Tournament details
- Host country: Bermuda
- Dates: 14 July – 18 July
- Teams: Men's 4 Women's 3
- Venue: 2 (in 1 host city)

Tournament statistics
- Matches played: 10
- Goals scored: 64 (6.4 per match)

Football at the 2013 Island Games took place from 14 to 18 July 2013 at Bermuda National Stadium and the Bermuda Athletics Association in Hamilton.

== Events ==
=== Medal table ===
* Host nation (Bermuda)

Rank	Nation	Gold	Silver	Bronze	Total
1	Bermuda (BER)*	2	0	0	2
2	Greenland (GRL)	0	2	0	2
Totals (2 entries)		2	2	0	4

=== Medal summary ===
Event	Gold	Silver	Bronze
Men	Bermuda; Drewonde Bascome; Oliver Jalen Harvey; Wendell Ming; Lejaun Simmons; Keishen Bean; Daniel Johnson; John Nusum; Rai Simons; Tyrell Burgess; Roger Lee; Cecoy Robinson; Shakir Smith; Domico Coddington; Zeko Lewis; Antwan Russell; Marco Warren; Fredrick Hall; Damon Ming; Angelo Simmons; Dominique Williams	Greenland; Johan Bidstrup; Frederik Jensen; Maasi Maqe; Minik Stephensen; Aputsiaq Birch; Daniel Knudsen; Kaali Mathæussen; Loke Svane; John-Ludvig Broberg; John Kreutzmann; Anders Petersen; Kaassannguaq Zeeb; Lars Peter Broberg; Norsaq Lund Mathæussen; Palu Petersen; Nukannguaq Zeeb; John Eldevig; Zakiu Lundblad	
Women	Bermuda; Stacy Babb; Cleashaunay Darrell-Virgil; Akeyla Furbert; Dominique Richardson; Waynesha Bean; Keunna Dill; Jessica Furtado; Teara Thomas; Cheyra Bell; Witnae Duerr; Rayni Maybury; Shuntae Todd; Khyla Brangman; Jenay Edness; Aaliyah Nolan; Tschana Wade; Tamisha Darrell; Kashintae Fox; Sarai Paul; Leanne Yates	Greenland; Tobiasine Abelsen; Lisa Fleischer; Karoline Malakiassen; Laila Platoú; Rasmine Berthelsen; Paneeraq Fleischer; Najaaraq Mørch; Manumina Reimer; Arnaq Bourup Egede; Anna-Karina Inûsugtok; Dodo Olsen Lyberth; Birthe Ugpernángitsok; Pilunnguaq Chemnitz; Bebiane Johnsen; Lisa Petersen; Karen-Louise Vetterlain; Karoline Dahl; Maannguaq Kristansen	
