= Tre Ming =

Bermudian football player (born 1994)

Personal information
- Full name: Wendell Tre' Ming
- Date of birth: 11 April 1994 (age 32)
- Place of birth: Hamilton, Bermuda
- Height: 1.78 m (5 ft 10 in)
- Position: Midfielder

College career
Years	Team	Apps	(Gls)
2012	Elmira Soaring Eagles	20	(4)
2013–2016	Thomas Terriers	56	(20)

Senior career*
Years	Team	Apps	(Gls)
2010–2011	PHC Zebras		
2011–2012	Bermuda Hogges	9	(1)
2012–2013	PHC Zebras		
2014	IMG Academy		
2015–	PHC Zebras	78	(36)

International career^{‡}
2010	Bermuda U17	5	(1)
2012	Bermuda U20	3	(1)
2013–	Bermuda	21	(3)
- * Club domestic league appearances and goals as of 20:44, 7 September 2018 (UTC) ‡ National team caps and goals as of 20:44, 16 November 2019 (UTC)

Wendell Tre' Ming (born 11 April 1994), commonly known as Tre Ming, is a Bermudian professional footballer who currently plays for Bermudian Premier Division side PHC Zebras.

== College career ==
Ming began his college career with South Kent in Connecticut, where he scored 8 goals in his junior year and set a South Kent record for assists in a season. While at the school, he received sponsorship money to go on trial with then-Premier League side Fulham, having spent time on trial with them and Portsmouth the previous year.

He enrolled at the Elmira College in 2012, and spent one year there, notching up 20 appearances and 4 goals. He was named Empire 8 Athletic Conference Rookie of the Year for his performances.

Ming then moved to the Thomas College, having received a scholarship from the Maine-based school, and helped the team win the 2013 North Atlantic Conference Championship in his first year. He spent the summer of 2014 with the IMG Academy in Bradenton, Florida, and played in the Premier Development League alongside fellow Bermudians Casey Castle, Drewonde Bascome and Jaylen Harvey.

He continued his good form over the next two years, amassing a total of 40 assists and 20 goals in 56 matches for the Terriers. He was named North Atlantic Conference Men's Soccer Player of the Year for 2015.

In October 2016, he was given a scholarship by the PHC Foundation to continue his studies at Thomas College.

== Club career ==
Ming has balanced his college and club football his whole career; having started out with the PHC Zebras in 2010 while he was studying at South Kent School and was still with the Warwick-based side in 2011.

He joined the Bermuda Hogges in 2011 and was there until mid 2012. He scored one goal in nine games during his time with the Hogges.

By late 2012, Ming was back with the Zebras, where he stayed until early 2013 before heading back to America to continue his studies at the Thomas College.

He returned again in 2015 and throughout the next few seasons spent time in both Bermuda and the United States, continuing his studies in the latter.

In April 2017, he helped the Zebras win the Bermuda FA Cup for the first time in nine years. He captained the team and had to take time off from school to participate.

== International career ==
Ming made his senior debut for Bermuda in 2013, playing 2 matches at the 2013 Island Games. He scored his first goal in a 2–1 win over French Guiana in March 2016.

== Career statistics ==
=== International ===
As of matches played 26 November 2019.

National team	Year	Apps	Goals
Bermuda	2013	2	0
Bermuda	2014	0	0
Bermuda	2015	6	0
Bermuda	2016	4	1
Bermuda	2017	3	1
Bermuda	2018	3	1
Bermuda	2019	3	0
Total		21	3

=== International goals ===
Scores and results list Bermuda's goal tally first.

No	Date	Venue	Opponent	Score	Result	Competition
1.	26 March 2016	Bermuda National Stadium, Hamilton, Bermuda	French Guiana	1–1	2–1	2017 Caribbean Cup qualification
2.	8 June 2017	Progress Park, Saint Andrew's, Grenada	Grenada	1–0	2–2	Friendly
3.	12 October 2018	Bermuda National Stadium, Hamilton, Bermuda	Sint Maarten	5–0	12–0	2019–20 CONCACAF Nations League qualification
