= 2019–20 Bermudian Premier Division =

Bermudian Premier Division
- Season: 2019–20
- Dates: 21 September 2019 – 22 March 2020
- Champions: North Village Rams
- Relegated: Boulevard Blazers; Somerset Eagles
- Caribbean Club Shield: North Village Rams
- Matches: 85
- Goals: 271 (3.19 per match)
- Top goalscorer: Donavan Thompson (13 goals)
- Biggest home win: X-Roads Warriors 10–1 Boulevard Blazers (1 March 2020)
- Biggest away win: PHC Zebras 0–6 Robin Hood (23 November 2019); Boulevard Blazers 0–6 Robin Hood (6 January 2020)
- Highest scoring: X-Roads Warriors 5–7 Dandy Town Hornets (2 November 2019)
- Longest winning run: 6 matches North Village Rams
- Longest unbeaten run: 10 matches Robin Hood
- Longest winless run: 11 matches Boulevard Blazers
- Longest losing run: 10 matches Boulevard Blazers
- All statistics correct as of 12 January 2020.

The 2019–20 Bermudian Premier Division is the 57th season of the Bermudian Premier Division, the highest tier of football in Bermuda. The season began on 21 September 2019 and was scheduled to conclude on 22 March 2020. However, the final round was postponed due to the COVID-19 pandemic. On 27 May, the final round was cancelled and all remaining matches were awarded as 0-0 draws.

== Teams ==
=== Team changes ===
To Premier Division

Promoted from the 2018–19 First Division

- Southampton Rangers
- Somerset Eagles

From Premier Division

Withdrew from the league

- BAA Wanderers

Relegated to the 2019–20 First Division

- Paget Lions

=== Stadia and locations ===
Locations of the 2019–20 Premier Division teams

Team	Home parish	Home ground
Boulevard Blazers	Pembroke	Goose Gosling Field
Dandy Town Hornets	Pembroke	St John's Field
Devonshire Cougars	Devonshire	Devonshire Recreation Club
North Village Rams	Pembroke	Bernard's Park
PHC Zebras	Warwick	PHC Field
Robin Hood	Pembroke	Goose Gosling Field
Somerset Eagles	Sandys	White Hill Field
Somerset Trojans	Sandys	Somerset Cricket Club Field
Southampton Rangers	Southampton	Southampton Oval
X-Roads Warriors	St George's	Garrison Field

== League table ==
Pos	Team	Pld	W	D	L	GF	GA	GD	Pts	Qualification or relegation
1	North Village Rams (C)	18	12	4	2	39	15	+24	40	Eligibility for entry into the Caribbean Club Shield
2	Dandy Town Hornets	18	10	5	3	40	25	+15	35	
3	Robin Hood	18	8	8	2	43	17	+26	32	
4	PHC Zebras	18	10	1	7	40	31	+9	31	
5	Somerset Trojans	18	6	5	7	28	35	−7	23	
6	Southampton Rangers	18	6	3	9	22	26	−4	21	
7	Devonshire Cougars	18	6	3	9	24	33	−9	21	
8	X-Roads Warriors	18	5	5	8	38	38	0	20	
9	Somerset Eagles	18	4	7	7	25	33	−8	19	Reprieved from relegation (Note: 2020-21 season will be played with 11 clubs, of which three will be relegated)
10	Boulevard Blazers (R)	18	1	3	14	10	56	−46	6	Relegation to the Bermuda First Division

Updated to match(es) played on 15 March 2020. Source: Soccerway
(C) Champions; (R) Relegated

== Results ==
Home \ Away	BBZ	DTH	DVC	NVR	PHC	RBH	SSE	SST	SOU	XRW
Boulevard Blazers	—	0–3	4–2	0–3	0–2	0–6	1–1	0–0	0–1	0–2
Dandy Town Hornets	3–1	—	5–2	1–2	1–0	0–1	2–2	4–3	0–0	2–0
Devonshire Cougars	2–0	1–2	—	0–4	2–1	3–1	2–1	0–2	0–2	0–0
North Village Rams	7–0	2–2	1–0	—	3–1	1–1	2–1	3–0	1–0	2–0
PHC Zebras	7–2	1–3	3–2	0–0	—	0–6	7–1	3–2	0–3	4–1
Robin Hood	2–0	0–0	1–1	2–1	1–2	—	1–1	8–1	1–1	3–0
Somerset Eagles	2–0	1–0	2–1	1–4	0–2	0–0	—	3–3	1–2	6–2
Somerset Trojans	2–0	2–2	1–2	0–1	0–3	3–3	1–1	—	3–0	2–1
Southampton Rangers	1–1	2–3	2–3	4–0	0–2	0–3	2–0	1–2	—	0–3
X-Roads Warriors	10–1	5–7	1–1	2–2	4–2	3–3	1–1	0–1	3–1	—

Updated to match(es) played on 15 March 2020. Source: Soccerway
Legend: Blue = home team win; Yellow = draw; Red = away team win.

== Top scorers ==
Rank	Player	Club	Goals
1	(Bermuda) Donavan Thompson	X-Roads Warriors	13
2	(Bermuda) Cecoy Robinson	PHC Zebras	12
3	(Bermuda) Lejuan Simmons	Robin Hood	11
3	(Bermuda) Jaizel Smith-Deshields	North Village Rams	11
5	(Bermuda) Tre Ming	PHC Zebras	9
5	(Bermuda) Marco Warren	PHC Zebras	9
7	(Bermuda) Clay Tillman Darrell	Dandy Town Hornets	7
7	(Bermuda) Tomiko Goater	Robin Hood	7
7	(Bermuda) Tyrell Burgess	X-Road Warriors	7
