= Kevin Richards =

Kevin Richards may refer to:

- Kevin Richards (radio broadcaster), American radio broadcaster
- Kevin Richards (footballer) (born 1981), Bermudian soccer player
- Kevin Richards (racing driver) (born 1962), American racing driver
