= Roger Lee (footballer) =

Bermudian footballer

Personal information
- Full name: Roger Colville Lee
- Date of birth: 1 July 1991 (age 35)
- Place of birth: Southampton, Bermuda
- Height: 1.80 m (5 ft 11 in)
- Position: Midfielder

Team information
- Current team: Heanor Town

Youth career
- 2009–2013: Indianapolis Greyhounds

Senior career*
Years	Team	Apps	(Gls)
2008–2010	Somerset Eagles		
2010–2012	Bermuda Hogges	35	(0)
2012–2014	Robin Hood		
2014	Weston-super-Mare	1	(0)
2014–2015	Clevedon Town	7	(0)
2015	Rugby Town	3	(0)
2015	Stamford	7	(0)
2015–2016	Basford United	7	(0)
2016	Corby Town	4	(0)
2016–2017	Stafford Rangers	2	(0)
2017–2018	Loughborough Dynamo	17	(0)
2017–2018	FK Jurnieks	6	(0)
2018–2019	JK Tallinna Kalev	24	(0)
2021–2022	Mickleover	12	(0)
2022	Loughborough Dynamo	13	(0)
2022–2023	Barwell	13	(0)
2023–2024	Rugby Town		
2024	Rugby Borough		
2024–2025	Quorn		
2025–	West Bridgford Colts	9	(0)
2025–	Heanor Town	18	(1)

International career^{‡}
2008–	Bermuda	33	(0)
- * Club domestic league appearances and goals as of 21:17, 4 April 2026 (BST) ‡ National team caps and goals as of 20:00, 8 August 2022 (UTC)

Roger Colville Lee (born 1 July 1991) is a Bermudian football player who plays for United Counties League Division One side West Bridgford Colts and United Counties League Premier Division North side Heanor Town, where he plays as a defender.

== Club career ==
Lee played for local side Somerset Eagles and the Bermuda Hogges in the USL Second Division. He also played for Indianapolis Greyhounds while studying at the University of Indianapolis.

In February 2014, Lee moved to England to play for Ilkeston joining compatriots Antwan Russell, Lejuan Simmons and Rai Simons at the club, but he only played a reserve game for them. He later joined Clevedon Town from Weston-Super-Mare, where he had moved in October 2014.

Lee returned to Ilkeston for training in summer 2015 after his previous spell was marred by injuries and he trained at Weston-Super-Mare and Gloucester City. After playing three matches for Rugby Town in September 2015, he joined Stamford in October 2015.

He joined Estonian Meistriliiga club Tallinna Kalev in December 2018.

On 19 August 2021, Lee signed for Northern Premier League Premier Division side Mickleover. Roger re-signed for Northern Premier League Division One Midlands side Loughborough Dynamo on 22 January 2022.

Lee signed for Southern League Premier Division Central side Barwell on 3 August 2022. He made his debut for the club on 6 August 2022 in a Southern League Premier Division Central fixture at home to Hitchin Town; the match finished 2–1 to the visitors.

Roger re-signed for Rugby Town in July 2023.

Lee currently plays for Nottinghamshire side West Bridgford Colts and Derbyshire side Heanor Town.

== International career ==
He made his debut for Bermuda in an August 2008 CONCACAF Gold Cup qualification match against Antigua and Barbuda and has, as of June 2019, earned a total of 22 caps, scoring no goals. He has represented his country in two FIFA World Cup qualification matches.

== Personal life ==
He was born in Southampton, Bermuda to Roger and Antoinett Lee.
