= Keishen Bean =

Bermudian footballer (born 1987)

Personal information
- Date of birth: March 17, 1987 (age 39)
- Place of birth: Bermuda
- Height: 5 ft 8 in (1.73 m)
- Position: Forward

Team information
- Current team: North Village Rams
- Number: 9

Youth career
- 2007: Lynn Fighting Knights
- 2009–2011: CBU Capers

Senior career*
| Years | Team | Apps | (Gls) |
| 2005–2009 | North Village Rams | | (18) |
| 2008–2009 | Bermuda Hogges | 18 | (2) |
| 2009 | Ottawa Fury | 12 | (4) |
| 2009–2010 | Somerset Eagles | | |
| 2010–2011 | Bermuda Hogges | 31 | (11) |
| 2013– | North Village Rams | | |

International career
| 2006– | Bermuda | 17 | (2) |
Medal record
Men's football
Representing Bermuda
Island Games
| Winner | 2013 Bermudas |
- * Club domestic league appearances and goals

Keishen Bean (born March 17, 1987) is a Bermudian footballer who currently plays for North Village Rams in the Bermudian Premier Division.

== Club career ==
Bean began his career with the Bermuda Hogges in the USL Second Division, until transferring to Ottawa Fury prior to the beginning of the 2009 PDL season. Bean is also playing with CBU Capers of the CIS. In 2009, he was selected to the 2009 AUS first team all-star. Keishen earned PDL 1st Team All conference honours in 2011 for a stand out season with the Hogges. Keishen continued his success into the 2011 Cape Breton CIS season earning CIS Athlete of the week honors.

== International career ==
He made his debut for Bermuda in a September 2006 CONCACAF Gold Cup qualification match against the US Virgin Islands and has, as of November 2015, earned a total of 17 caps, scoring 2 goals. He has represented his country in 8 FIFA World Cup qualification matches. He played in all four of Bermuda's qualifying games for the 2010 FIFA World Cup, including their 3–1 victory over the Cayman Islands on March 30, 2008, and their historic 2–1 victory over Trinidad and Tobago on June 15, 2008.

=== International goals ===
Scores and results list Bermuda's goal tally first.

| No | Date | Venue | Opponent | Score | Result | Competition |
|---|---|---|---|---|---|---|
| 1. | 9 June 2008 | Bermuda National Stadium, Hamilton, Bermuda | Barbados | 1–0 | 3–0 | Friendly |
| 2. | 9 June 2008 | Bermuda National Stadium, Hamilton, Bermuda | Barbados | 2–0 | 3–0 | Friendly |

== Honours ==
Bermuda

- Island Games: 2013
