= Omar Shakir =

Bermudian footballer (born 1977)

Personal information
- Full name: Omar Shakir
- Date of birth: 16 May 1977 (age 49)
- Place of birth: Bermuda
- Height: 5 ft 11 in (1.80 m)
- Position: Defender

Youth career
- 1996–2000: Howard University

Senior career*
Years	Team	Apps	(Gls)
- Dandy Town Hornets
2007–2009	Bermuda Hogges	47	(3)
2007–2011	PHC Zebras		

International career^{‡}
2008	Bermuda	8	(1)
- * Club domestic league appearances and goals as of 11 October 2009 ‡ National team caps and goals as of 30 January 2016

Omar Shakir (born 16 May 1977) is a retired Bermudian football player.

== Career ==
=== Club ===
Shakir began his career with PHC Zebras at the age of 7, playing from the youth ranks right through to the senior team, playing every position on the field along the way, besides goalkeeper. After high school, he received an athletic scholarship for soccer to Howard University in Washington DC. He was a part of the Mid-Continent Conference championship winning Howard University Bison team in 1998 and runners-up in 1997, picking up several scholar/athlete awards during his four-year playing career. After arriving back to Bermuda in 2000, Shakir had very brief stints at some clubs before eventually returning to his boyhood team PHC Zebras, where he consistently played for many years in the Bermudian Premier Division winning.

He was the third selection of the first round draft pick for the newly formed Island Soccer League in Bermuda before opting instead to join the Bermuda Hogges in the USL Second Division in 2007 captaining the team in the 2008 and 2009 seasons. He then captained PHC Zebras in the 2010–11 season.

=== International ===
He made his debut for Bermuda in a January 2008 friendly match against Puerto Rico and earned eight caps, scoring one goal. He has represented his country in four FIFA World Cup qualification matches. He played in all four of Bermuda's qualifying games for the 2010 FIFA World Cup, including their 3–1 victory over the Cayman Islands on 30 March 2008, and their historic 2–1 victory over Trinidad and Tobago on 15 June 2008. He was also the captain of the Bermuda National team during their qualifying campaign.

His final international match was a June 2008 World Cup qualification match against Trinidad and Tobago.

=== International goals ===
Scores and results list Bermuda's goal tally first.

N.	Date	Venue	Opponent	Score	Result	Competition	Refs
1.	6 June 2008	National Stadium, Hamilton, Bermuda	Barbados	1–0	2–1	Friendly match	
