= Zeiko Lewis =

Bermudian footballer

Personal information
- Full name: Zeiko Troy Jahmiko Lewis
- Date of birth: 4 June 1994 (age 32)
- Place of birth: Spanish Point, Bermuda
- Height: 1.70 m (5 ft 7 in)
- Position: Forward

Team information
- Current team: Union Omaha
- Number: 11

Youth career
- 2001–2009: Dandy Town Hornets

College career
Years	Team	Apps	(Gls)
2013–2016	Boston College Eagles	73	(18)

Senior career*
Years	Team	Apps	(Gls)
2011–2012	Bermuda Hogges	15	(1)
2014–2017	Real Boston Rams	7	(4)
2017	New York Red Bulls	0	(0)
2017	New York Red Bulls II	23	(2)
2018	FH	4	(0)
2018	→ HK (loan)	7	(3)
2019–2021	Charleston Battery	67	(18)
2022–2023	Sacramento Republic	53	(4)
2024	Union Omaha	15	(1)

International career^{‡}
2010	Bermuda U17	5	(3)
2012	Bermuda U20	2	(0)
2011–	Bermuda	42	(12)
Medal record
Men's football
Representing Bermuda
Island Games
Winner	2013 Bermudas
- * Club domestic league appearances and goals as of 25 November 2024 ‡ National team caps and goals as of 9 June 2024

Zeiko Troy Jahmiko Lewis (born 4 June 1994) is a Bermudian footballer who plays for USL League One side Union Omaha and the Bermuda national team.

== Career ==
=== Youth and college ===
Lewis was born in Spanish Point, Bermuda, where he was raised by his mother, Nicole, and father, Tory. He began his footballing career with the Dandy Town Hornets youth setup. Working his way up the academy, he moved to the United States, where he attended the Berkshire School in Sheffield, Massachusetts. During his freshman year at Berkshire, Lewis tallied a team-high eight goals and eight assists, which led to a national call up by Bermuda's under-17 national team.

After gradual improvement, Lewis had an explosive senior season, tallying 33 goals. The success led to being named an NSCAA All-American as a senior scored a goal in the High School All-American Game. Lewis was the only player from Massachusetts invited to the game, and one of three from New England.

Lewis also spent two seasons with Bermuda Hogges in the USL Premier Development League. He also played for Real Boston Rams.

His success at Berkshire landed him a scholarship with Boston College. In his freshman year with the Eagles, Lewis led the team with 17 points, and led the team in assists, with 11. He was tied for second in goals during the season. He also won the 2013 ACC Men's Soccer Freshman of the Year award.

=== New York Red Bulls ===
Ahead of the 2017 MLS SuperDraft, Lewis signed a senior college contract with Major League Soccer. He was selected 17th overall in the 2017 MLS SuperDraft by the New York Red Bulls. Per league policy the terms were not disclosed. On April 1, 2017, Lewis made his professional debut for New York Red Bulls II, scoring the lone goal in a 1–0 victory over Richmond Kickers.

=== Charleston Battery ===
After spending a season in Iceland, Lewis returned to the United States by signing with the Charleston Battery of USL Championship on 7 February 2019. In January 2020 it was announced that Lewis will remain with The Battery for the 2020 season.

=== Sacramento Republic FC ===
Lewis signed with Sacramento Republic FC on 22 December 2021. He left Sacramento following their 2023 season.

=== Union Omaha ===
On 28 March 2024, Lewis signed with USL League One side Union Omaha.

== International ==
Lewis received his first international cap for Bermuda on September 2, 2011. He came on as a 77th-minute substitute for Nahki Wells in a 1–0 loss to Trinidad and Tobago in a World Cup qualifier.

=== International goals ===
Scores and results list Bermuda's goal tally first.

No.	Date	Venue	Opponent	Score	Result	Competition
1.	14 July 2013	Bermuda National Stadium, Devonshire Parish, Bermuda	Greenland	3–0	3–0	2013 Island Games
2.	15 July 2013	Bermuda National Stadium, Devonshire Parish, Bermuda	Falkland Islands	4–0	8–0	2013 Island Games
3.	15 July 2013	Bermuda National Stadium, Devonshire Parish, Bermuda	Falkland Islands	6–0	8–0	2013 Island Games
4.	25 March 2015	Thomas Robinson Stadium, Nassau, Bahamas	Bahamas	3–0	5–0	2018 FIFA World Cup qualification
5.	21 March 2018	Sir Vivian Richards Stadium, North Sound, Antigua and Barbuda	Antigua and Barbuda	1–1	3–2	Friendly
6.	12 October 2018	Bermuda National Stadium, Devonshire Parish, Bermuda	Sint Maarten	4–0	12–0	2019–20 CONCACAF Nations League qualification
7.	12 October 2018	Bermuda National Stadium, Devonshire Parish, Bermuda	Sint Maarten	6–0	12–0	2019–20 CONCACAF Nations League qualification
8.	12 October 2018	Bermuda National Stadium, Devonshire Parish, Bermuda	Sint Maarten	12–0	12–0	2019–20 CONCACAF Nations League qualification
9.	24 March 2019	Estadio Cibao, Santiago, Dominican Republic	Dominican Republic	1–1	3–1	2019–20 CONCACAF Nations League qualification
10.	5 March 2021	IMG Academy, Bradenton, United States	Bahamas	1–0	3–0	Friendly
11.	2 July 2021	DRV PNK Stadium, Fort Lauderdale, United States	Barbados	7–1	8–1	2021 CONCACAF Gold Cup qualification
12.	9 June 2024	Bermuda National Stadium, Devonshire Parish, Bermuda	Honduras	1–1	1–6	2026 FIFA World Cup qualification

== Honours ==
Bermuda

- Island Games: 2013
