= Shakir Smith =

Bermudian footballer (born 1987)

Personal information
- Date of birth: January 6, 1987 (age 39)
- Place of birth: Bermuda
- Position: Defender

Team information
- Current team: PHC Zebras

Senior career*
Years	Team	Apps	(Gls)
2011–2012	Bermuda Hogges	18	(1)
2011–	PHC Zebras		

International career^{‡}
- Bermuda U20
2012–	Bermuda	3	(0)
Medal record
Men's football
Representing Bermuda
Island Games
Winner	2013 Bermudas
- * Club domestic league appearances and goals as of April 21, 2013 ‡ National team caps and goals as of April 21, 2013

Shakir Smith (born January 6, 1987) is a Bermudian footballer who currently plays for PHC Zebras.

== Club career ==
Smith began his career as a defender with PHC Zebras before joining the Bermuda Hogges in the USL Second Division.

== International career ==
He made his debut for Bermuda in a September 2012 CONCACAF Gold Cup qualification match against Puerto Rico and has, as of November 2015, earned a total of 3 caps, scoring no goals.

== Honours ==
Bermuda

- Island Games: 2013
