= Antonio Lowe =

Bermudian footballer

Personal information
- Date of birth: 9 June 1986 (age 40)
- Place of birth: Bermuda
- Position: Left back

Team information
- Current team: Dandy Town Hornets

Youth career
- 2007–2010: CBU Capers

Senior career*
Years	Team	Apps	(Gls)
2009–	Dandy Town Hornets		

International career^{‡}
2007–2008	Bermuda	8	(0)
- * Club domestic league appearances and goals as of 09:55, 7 September 2009 (UTC) ‡ National team caps and goals as of 09:55, 7 September 2009 (UTC)

Antonio Lowe (born 9 June 1986) is a Bermudian international footballer who plays for Dandy Town Hornets.

== Club career ==
He played college soccer for CBU Capers as a defender, joining compatriots Jason Davis and Jacqui Simons.

== International career ==
He made his debut for Bermuda in a December 2007 friendly match against St Kitts & Nevis and earned a total of 8 caps, scoring no goals. He has represented his country in 3 FIFA World Cup qualification matches.

His final international match was an August 2008 CONCACAF Gold Cup qualification match against the Cayman Islands.
