= Drewonde Bascome =

Bermudan footballer

Personal information
- Date of birth: 17 November 1992 (age 33)
- Place of birth: Bermuda
- Position: Midfielder

Team information
- Current team: Robin Hood FC

Senior career*
Years	Team	Apps	(Gls)
2010–	Robin Hood FC	?	(?)
2012	→ Bermuda Hogges (loan)	12	(0)

International career^{‡}
2012–	Bermuda	8	(0)
Medal record
Men's football
Representing Bermuda
Island Games
Winner	2013 Bermudas
- * Club domestic league appearances and goals ‡ National team caps and goals as of 21 February 2016

Drewonde Bascome (born 17 November 1992) is a Bermudan footballer who currently plays for Robin Hood FC and the Bermuda national football team as a midfielder.

== Personal life ==
Drewonde Bascome is the cousin of Osagi Bascome, who was also an international footballer with Bermuda.

== International career ==
Bascome has represented his team at various youth levels and in one instance captained the U-20 team and scored a stoppage time winner against Saint Kitts and Nevis that earned him the man-of-the-match award.

== Honours ==
Bermuda

- Island Games: 2013
