= Michael Parsons =

Michael Parsons may refer to:

- Michael Parsons (composer) (born 1938), British composer
- Michael Parsons (cricketer) (born 1984), English cricketer
- Michael Parsons (engineer) (1928–2021), designer of major suspension bridges
- Michael Parsons (Australian footballer) (1960–2009), Australian rules player
- Michael Parsons, 6th Earl of Rosse (1906–1979), Irish peer
- Mike Parsons (surfer) (born 1965), American surfer
- Michael Parsons (Bermudian footballer) (born 1979), Bermudian soccer player
- Mike Parsons (Barchester Healthcare) (born 1950), British entrepreneur, founder of Barchester Healthcare
- Michael Parsons (figure skater) (born 1995), American ice dancer
- Michael Parsons (singer) (born 1994), British singer from District3
- Mike Parsons (born 1942), British former CEO of outdoor equipment company Karrimor

== See also ==
- Micah Parsons (born 1999), American football player
- Mike Parson (born 1955), 57th Governor of Missouri from 2018 to 2025
