= Carlos Smith =

Carlos Smith may refer to:

- G. Carlos Smith (1910–1987), youth leader in the Church of Jesus Christ of Latter-day Saints
- Carlos Smith (footballer) (born 1969), Bahamian football player
- Carlos Guillermo Smith (born 1980), community activist, lobbyist, and politician from Florida
- Carlos Green Smith (1813–1892), American educator
