= Damon Ming =

Bermudian footballer (born 1978)

Personal information
- Full name: Damon Jason Ming
- Date of birth: 24 October 1978 (age 48)
- Place of birth: Paget, Bermuda
- Height: 5 ft 6 in (1.68 m)
- Position: Midfielder

Team information
- Current team: Dandy Town Hornets

College career
| Years | Team | Apps | (Gls) |
| 1998–2001 | High Point Panthers | | |

Senior career*
| Years | Team | Apps | (Gls) |
| 2002–2004 | Somerset Trojans | | |
| 2004–2005 | Barnet | 0 | (0) |
| 2005–2006 | Maidenhead United | 3 | (0) |
| 2006 | Aylesbury United | 12 | (2) |
| 2006 | → Hayes (loan) | 0 | (0) |
| 2007 | Northwood | 7 | (1) |
| 2007–2012 | Bermuda Hogges | 100 | (11) |
| 2013– | Dandy Town Hornets | | |

International career^{‡}
| 2003–2016 | Bermuda | 43 | (8) |
Medal record
Men's football
Representing Bermuda
Island Games
| Winner | 2013 Bermudas |
- * Club domestic league appearances and goals as of 17:04, 13 November 2012 (UTC) ‡ National team caps and goals as of 19:05, 4 April 2019 (UTC)

Damon Ming (born 24 October 1978) is a Bermudian footballer who plays for Dandy Town Hornets.

== Club career ==
Ming was born in Paget. He has played for Barnet, Maidenhead United, Aylesbury United, Hayes and Northwood in the English leagues.

In November 2008, he joined Dandy Town Hornets after being released from his Bermuda Hogges franchise contract that prevented him playing in Bermuda.

He re-joined the Hogges prior to the 2009 season, and played in 20 games for the team during the year; he remained with the team when the Hogges self-relegated to the USL Premier Development League in 2010.

== International career ==
Ming made his debut for the Bermuda national team in a December 2003 friendly match against Barbados and has earned over 40 caps since, making him the most capped player of the national team.

He featured in 13 FIFA World Cup qualification matches, scoring 4 goals.

== Career statistics ==
=== International ===
Appearances and goals by national team and year
| National team | Year | Apps | Goals |
|---|---|---|---|
| Bermuda | 2003 | 1 | 0 |
| Bermuda | 2004 | 13 | 5 |
| Bermuda | 2005 | 1 | 0 |
| Bermuda | 2007 | 4 | 0 |
| Bermuda | 2008 | 9 | 2 |
| Bermuda | 2011 | 4 | 0 |
| Bermuda | 2012 | 3 | 0 |
| Bermuda | 2013 | 3 | 1 |
| Bermuda | 2015 | 3 | 0 |
| Bermuda | 2016 | 2 | 0 |
| Total | | 43 | 8 |

Scores and results list Bermuda's goal tally first, score column indicates score after each Ming goal.

List of international goals scored by Damon Ming
| No. | Date | Venue | Opponent | Score | Result | Competition | Ref. |
|---|---|---|---|---|---|---|---|
| 1 | 29 February 2004 | Bermuda National Stadium, Devonshire Parish, Bermuda | Montserrat | 1–0 | 13–0 | 2006 FIFA World Cup qualification | |
| 2 | 29 February 2004 | Bermuda National Stadium, Devonshire Parish, Bermuda | Montserrat | 3–0 | 13–0 | 2006 FIFA World Cup qualification | |
| 3 | 29 February 2004 | Bermuda National Stadium, Devonshire Parish, Bermuda | Montserrat | 7–0 | 13–0 | 2006 FIFA World Cup qualification | |
| 4 | 21 March 2004 | Blakes Estate Stadium, Montserrat | Montserrat | 7–0 | 7–0 | 2006 FIFA World Cup qualification | |
| 5 | 26 November 2004 | Arnos Vale Stadium, Arnos Vale, Saint Vincent and the Grenadines | Saint Vincent and the Grenadines | 3–3 | 3–3 | 2005 Caribbean Cup qualification | |
| 6 | 6 June 2008 | Bermuda National Stadium, Devonshire Parish, Bermuda | Barbados | 2–1 | 2–1 | Friendly | |
| 7 | 30 August 2008 | Truman Bodden Sports Complex, George Town, Cayman Islands | Saint-Martin | 2–0 | 7–0 | 2008 Caribbean Cup qualification | |
| 8 | 15 July 2013 | Bermuda National Stadium, Devonshire Parish, Bermuda | Falkland Islands | 2–0 | 8–0 | 2013 Island Games | |

== Honours ==
Bermuda

- Island Games: 2013
