= Cecoy Robinson =

Bermudian footballer

Personal information
- Date of birth: 10 October 1987 (age 39)
- Place of birth: Bermuda
- Position: Forward

Team information
- Current team: PHC Zebras

Senior career*
| Years | Team | Apps | (Gls) |
| 2005–2021 | PHC Zebras | 360 | (188) |
| 2008–2012 | → Bermuda Hogges (loan) | 2 | (0) |
| 2012–2013 | → Bermuda Hogges (loan) | 6 | (0) |
| 2021– | Dandy Town Hornets | 19 | (7) |

International career
- Bermuda U20
| 2005– | Bermuda | 15 | (1) |
Medal record
Men's football
Representing Bermuda
Island Games
| Winner | 2013 Bermudas |
- * Club domestic league appearances and goals as of 13:23, 23 June 2019 (UTC)

Cecoy Robinson (born 10 October 1987) is a Bermudian footballer who plays for PHC Zebras and the Bermuda national team.

== Honours ==
Bermuda

- Island Games: 2013
