= Casey Castle =

Bermudian footballer

Personal information
- Full name: Casey Castle
- Date of birth: 22 August 1991 (age 35)
- Place of birth: Southampton Parish, Bermuda
- Height: 1.68 m (5 ft 6 in)
- Position: Forward

Youth career
- 2010–2011: Thomas Terriers
- 2011–2013: Indianapolis Greyhounds

Senior career*
Years	Team	Apps	(Gls)
2008–2011	PHC Zebras		
2011–2012	Bermuda Hogges		
2014	IMG Academy Bradenton		
2015	Hamilton Paris		
2015–2016	PHC Zebras		
2016	Walton & Hersham		(0)

International career^{‡}
- Bermuda U20
- Bermuda U23
2008–2018	Bermuda	5	(3)
- * Club domestic league appearances and goals as of 17 December 2016 ‡ National team caps and goals as of 17 December 2016

Casey Castle (born 22 August 1991) is a Bermudian footballer.

== Club career ==
=== College ===
In 2008, Castle joined PHC Zebras. In 2010, Castle played college football for Thomas College in the United States. Scoring 11 goals in 16 games, he was named Rookie of the Year in the 2011 North Atlantic Conference while being named in the All-Tournament Team.

=== North America ===
In 2011, Castle joined Bermuda Hogges and finished sixth in his inaugural Premier Development League Mid Atlantic Division season.

In April 2014, he was drafted by Premier Development League side IMG Academy Bradenton. Following the dissolution of the Hogges, the club's owner ensured a deal could be completed after the side pulled out of the league prior to the 2013 season.

In 2015, Castle lined-up for Hamilton Paris. In March 2015, he took part in the Soccerviza Auburndale Florida Combine in Orlando and was offered trials in Iceland and Finland. In September 2015, Castle returned to PHC Zebras for a second spell.

=== England ===
In July 2016, Castle moved to England in hope of signing of a professional contract. In August 2016, he joined Combined Counties Premier Division club Walton & Hersham in the ninth tier. He made four league appearances for the Swans, as well as substitute cameos in the FA Vase and Combined Counties Challenge Cup.

Castle also made six appearances for the Walton & Hersham Reserves in the Suburban League South Division. His early performances saw him attract scouts from non-league clubs Dulwich Hamlet and Hampton & Richmond Borough, as well as Championship side Reading.

== International career ==
In August 2008, Castle made his debut for Bermuda. Featuring against Saint Martin in a CONCACAF Gold Cup qualification match, he immediately scored a brace. He scored a third international goal in as many matches when Bermuda beat Grenada in March 2015.

At the youth level he featured on various squads ranging from under-14 to under-23.

== Career statistics ==
=== International ===
Appearances and goals by national team and year
National team	Year	Apps	Goals
Bermuda	2008	2	2
Bermuda	2009	–	
Bermuda	2010	–	
Bermuda	2011	–	
Bermuda	2012	–	
Bermuda	2013	–	
Bermuda	2014	–	
Bermuda	2015	1	1
Bermuda	2016	–	
Bermuda	2017	1	0
Bermuda	2018	1	0
Total		5	3

Scores and results list Bermuda's goal tally first, score column indicates score after each Castle goal.

List of international goals scored by Casey Castle
No.	Date	Venue	Opponent	Score	Result	Competition
1	30 August 2008	Truman Bodden Stadium, George Town, Cayman Islands	Saint Martin	6–0	7–0	2008 Caribbean Cup qualification
2	30 August 2008	Truman Bodden Stadium, George Town, Cayman Islands	Saint Martin	2–0	7–0	2008 Caribbean Cup qualification
3	8 March 2015	National Stadium, Hamilton, Bermuda	Grenada	2–0	2–0	Friendly

== Personal life ==
Castle is the son of former son PHC Zebras defender and coach Jack Castle. He majored in finance during his time in America.
