= Lloyd Holder =

Bermudian footballer

lloyd euHolder
Personal information
- Full name: Laurence lloyd eugene Holder
- Date of birth: August 30, 1977 (age 49)
- Place of birth: Bermuda
- Height: 5 ft 11 in (1.80 m)
- Position: Defender

Team information
- Current team: Bermuda Hogges
- Number: 21

Senior career*
Years	Team	Apps	(Gls)
2003–2004	Devonshire Colts		
2006	Dandy Town Hornets		
2007–2009	Bermuda Hogges	31	(5)

International career
2007	Bermuda	1	(0)
- * Club domestic league appearances and goals as of 11 October 2009

Laurence "Lloyd" Holder (born August 30, 1977) is a Bermudian soccer player who currently plays for the Bermuda Hogges in the USL Second Division.

== Career ==
=== Club ===
Holder began his career in the Bermudian Premier Division, playing for both the Devonshire Colts and the Dandy Town Hornets, before joining the Bermuda Hogges in the USL Second Division in 2007.
