= Stephen Astwood =

Bermudian footballer (born 1981)

Stevie Astwood
Personal information
- Full name: Stephen Arnez Astwood
- Date of birth: 8 September 1981 (age 45)
- Place of birth: Bermuda
- Height: 6 ft 1 in (1.85 m)
- Position: Midfielder

Senior career*
Years	Team	Apps	(Gls)
2001–2005	PHC Zebras		
2005–2006	Somerset Trojans		
2007–2009	Bermuda Hogges	41	(12)
2011–2012	PHC Zebras		
2012–2014	Southampton Rangers		

International career^{‡}
2000–2008	Bermuda	26	(3)
- * Club domestic league appearances and goals as of 11 October 2009 ‡ National team caps and goals as of 23 December 2015

Stephen Astwood (born 8 September 1981) is a retired Bermudian football player.

== Club career ==
Astwood began his career as a striker with PHC Zebras and the Somerset Trojans, and played for several years in the Bermudian Premier Division before joining the Bermuda Hogges in the USL Second Division for its inaugural season in 2007. He has been a starting midfielder throughout his three seasons with the team and was named the league's Rookie of the Year in 2007.

In summer 2012, Astwood joined Southampton Rangers from PHC Zebras.

== International career ==
He made his debut for Bermuda in a January 2000 friendly match against Canada and earned a total of 26 caps, scoring 3 goals. He has represented his country in 9 FIFA World Cup qualification matches.

His final international match was an August 2008 CONCACAF Gold Cup qualification match against the Cayman Islands.

=== International goals ===
Scores and results list Bermuda's goal tally first.

N.	Date	Venue	Opponent	Score	Result	Competition
1.	19 March 2000	National Stadium, Hamilton, Bermuda	British Virgin Islands	6–0	9–0	2002 FIFA World Cup qualification
2.	19 March 2000	National Stadium, Hamilton, Bermuda	British Virgin Islands	8–0	9–0	2002 FIFA World Cup qualification
3.	28 April 2004	Estadio Rommel Fernández, Panama City, Panama	Panama	1–0	1–4	Friendly
