= Devaun DeGraff =

Bermudian footballer (born 1980)

Personal information
- Full name: Devaun Samuel DeGraff
- Date of birth: 25 December 1980 (age 45)
- Place of birth: Bermuda
- Height: 6 ft 0 in (1.83 m)
- Position: Midfielder

Senior career*
Years	Team	Apps	(Gls)
2005–2012	North Village Rams		
–2006	Dallas Lightning		
2007–2009	Bermuda Hogges	39	(0)

International career
2006–2011	Bermuda	14	(3)
- * Club domestic league appearances and goals

Devaun "Sammy" DeGraff (born 25 December 1980) is a Bermudian former footballer who played as a midfielder.

== Club career ==
DeGraff played the majority of his career with local side North Village Rams, and played for the team for one year in the Bermudian Premier Division before joining the Bermuda Hogges in the USL Second Division in 2007. He was mostly used as a holding or attacking midfielder at the Villagers. He also played in Texas for Dallas Lightning.

He announced his retirement in August 2012.

== International career ==
He made his debut for Bermuda in a September 2006 Caribbean Cup qualification match against the US Virgin Islands and earned a total of 14 caps, scoring 3 goals. He has represented his country in 7 FIFA World Cup qualification matches. He played in two of Bermuda's qualifying games for the 2010 FIFA World Cup, including their 3–1 victory over the Cayman Islands on 30 March 2008.

His final international match was a November 2011 World Cup qualification match against Barbados.

== Personal life ==
DeGraff returned to Bermuda in 2006 to become a music teacher at Whitney Institute. He plays the saxophone himself.

DeGraff missed a World Cup qualification match against Trinidad and Tobago in 2011 because it was played on a Friday night, which did not met his beliefs as a Seventh-Day Adventist. In March 2013, he co-hosted a show on the local Seventh-day Adventist television station, Channel 80.

== Career statistics ==
Scores and results list Bermuda's goal tally first.

N.	Date	Venue	Opponent	Score	Result	Competition
1.	16 December 2007	National Stadium, Hamilton, Bermuda	Saint Kitts and Nevis	3–0	4–2	Friendly
2.	30 March 2008	Truman Bodden Stadium, George Town, Cayman Islands	Cayman Islands	1–0	3–1	2010 FIFA World Cup qualification
3.	30 March 2008	Truman Bodden Stadium, George Town, Cayman Islands	Cayman Islands	2–0	3–1	2010 FIFA World Cup qualification
