= Logan Alexander =

Bermudian footballer (born 1986)

Personal information
- Full name: Logan Blake Alexander
- Date of birth: 10 June 1986 (age 40)
- Place of birth: Southampton Parish, Bermuda
- Height: 1.80 m (5 ft 11 in)
- Position: Defender

College career
Years	Team	Apps	(Gls)
2004–2005	UAB Blazers		

Senior career*
Years	Team	Apps	(Gls)
2006–2009	North Village Rams		
2009–2010	Baltimore Blast (indoor)	1	(0)
2010	Bermuda Hogges	6	(0)
2011–2012	North Village Rams		
2012	Brantford Galaxy	3	(0)

International career^{‡}
2004–2006	Bermuda	3	(0)
- * Club domestic league appearances and goals as of 28 February 2011 ‡ National team caps and goals as of 28 February 2011

Logan Blake Alexander (born 10 June 1986) is a Bermudian international footballer who played in the Bermudian Premier Division, Major Indoor Soccer League, USL Premier Development League, and the Canadian Soccer League.

== Club career ==
Alexander played college soccer with the UAB Blazers before returning to Bermuda to play for North Village Rams. He turned professional when he signed with National Indoor Soccer League side Baltimore Blast. He then had a spell at Bermuda Hogges before returning to North Village. In 2012, he went overseas to Canada to sign with Brantford Galaxy of the Canadian Soccer League.

== International career ==
Alexander made his debut for Bermuda in a January 2004 friendly match against Barbados and earned a total of 3 caps, scoring no goals.

His final international was a November 2006 Gold Cup qualification match against Saint Vincent & the Grenadines.

== Personal life ==
He is a son of Jackie Blake and Judith Alexander.
