= Kofi Dill =

Bermudian footballer (born 1979)

Personal information
- Full name: Kofi Dill
- Date of birth: October 19, 1979 (age 47)
- Place of birth: Bermuda
- Height: 5 ft 11 in (1.80 m)
- Position: Defender

Senior career*
Years	Team	Apps	(Gls)
2001–2012	North Village Rams		
2008–2009	Bermuda Hogges	10	(0)

International career^{‡}
1999–2008	Bermuda	15	(0)
- * Club domestic league appearances and goals as of 11 October 2009 ‡ National team caps and goals as of 3 January 2016

Kofi Dill (born 19 October 1979) is a retired Bermudian football player.

== Club career ==
Dill began his career with North Village Rams, and played for the team for six years in the Bermudian Premier Division prior to joining the Bermuda Hogges in the USL Second Division in 2008. After retiring, he continued to play for Rams' Corona League team.

== International career ==
He made his debut for Bermuda in a January 1999 friendly match against Antigua and Barbuda and earned a total of 15 caps, scoring no goals. He has represented his country in 3 FIFA World Cup qualification matches. He played in one of Bermuda's qualifying games for the 2006 FIFA World Cup, and in two of Bermuda's qualifying games for the 2010 FIFA World Cup, including their historic 2–1 victory over Trinidad and Tobago on June 15, 2008. That match also proved to be his final international game.
