= John Barry Nusum =

Bermudian footballer (born 1981)

Personal information
- Date of birth: March 18, 1981 (age 45)
- Place of birth: Mineola, New York, U.S.
- Height: 5 ft 11 in (1.80 m)
- Position: Forward

Team information
- Current team: Bermuda (manager)

College career
Years	Team	Apps	(Gls)
1998–2001	Furman Paladins		

Senior career*
Years	Team	Apps	(Gls)
2002–2003	Atlanta Silverbacks	44	(10)
2004	Toronto Lynx	22	(4)
2005–2006	Virginia Beach Mariners	40	(7)
2004–2009	Philadelphia KiXX (indoor)	105	(79)
2008	Bermuda Hogges	13	(2)
2009	Crystal Palace Baltimore	5	(0)
2012	Bermuda Hogges	1	(0)
2012–2014	Wolves SC		
2014–2015	Robin Hood		

International career
2000–2013	Bermuda	36	(19)

Managerial career
- 2011–2012: Wolves SC
- 2014–2026: Bermuda (assistant)
- 2026–: Bermuda
Medal record
Men's football
Representing Bermuda
Island Games
Winner	2013 Bermudas
- * Club domestic league appearances and goals

John Barry Nusum (born March 18, 1981) is former professional association footballer. Born in the United States, he made 36 appearances for the Bermuda national team, scoring 19 goals.

== Club career ==
=== College ===
Born in Mineola, New York, Nusum grew up in Devonshire, Bermuda, before returning to the United States to play college soccer at Furman University. At Furman he was named a NSCAA All-American three times. He is also currently the school's all-time leader in goals scored (61) and points (161).

=== Professional ===
After graduating from Furman, Nusum was selected 35th overall in the 2002 MLS SuperDraft by the Columbus Crew. Unsuccessful in making the Crew, he instead spent two seasons with the A-League's Atlanta Silverbacks, scoring ten goals with three assists in 44 games, before joining the Toronto Lynx for the 2004 A-League season, finishing with 4 goals in 25 games. Nusum also has extensive professional indoor soccer experience, having played with the Philadelphia KiXX since 2004. He was the 2005 MISL Rookie of the Year. In 2007, the KiXX MISL championship. In 2005 and 2006, he played for the Virginia Beach Mariners. In 2008, he was with the Bermuda Hogges. On March 2, 2009, he signed with Crystal Palace Baltimore.

He returned to Bermuda to become player/manager at Wolves, only to be replaced by Don Vickers for him to concentrate on playing.

== International career ==
Nusum was a mainstay in, and captain of, the Bermudian national team, leading the team in goals during the 2006 World Cup Qualifying round. He scored two goals to lead Bermuda to a 2–1 win at Trinidad and Tobago in the second round of 2010 World Cup qualifying. He quit the national team in 2013 and is Bermuda's record international goalscorer.

== Coaching career ==
He was named assistant coach at the national team set-up in December 2014, while still playing for Robin Hood.

== Personal life ==
John is the nephew of former Bermudian international goalkeeper and New York Cosmos star Sam Nusum and the son of John Nusum. Nusum is a teacher at Saltus Grammar School, Bermuda, where he teaches the subjects of Physical Education and Sociology.

== Career statistics ==
=== Club ===
(correct as of September 29, 2009)

Appearances and goals by club, season and competition
Club	Season	League		Cup (Note: Includes Lamar Hunt US Open Cup.)		Play-Offs		Total	
Club	Season	Apps	Goals	Apps	Goals	Apps	Goals	Apps	Goals
Atlanta Silverbacks	2002	26	4			–		26	4
Atlanta Silverbacks	2003	18	6			–		18	6
Atlanta Silverbacks	Total	44	10			0	0	44	10
Toronto Lynx	2004	22	4			–		22	4
Virginia Beach Mariners	2005	19	4			–		19	4
Virginia Beach Mariners	2006	21	3			–		21	3
Virginia Beach Mariners	Total	40	7			0	0	40	7
Bermuda Hogges	2008	13	2	–		–		13	2
Crystal Palace Baltimore	2009	5	0	0	0	0	0	5	0
Career total		124	23	0	0	0	0	124	23

=== International ===
Appearances and goals by national team and year
National team	Year	Apps	Goals
Bermuda	2000	3	2
Bermuda	2003	1	1
Bermuda	2004	10	9
Bermuda	2006	5	3
Bermuda	2007	2	0
Bermuda	2008	9	3
Bermuda	2011	5	1
Bermuda	2012	3	0
Bermuda	2013	3	0
Total		41	19

Scores and results list Bermuda's goal tally first, score column indicates score after each Nusum goal.

List of international goals scored by John Barry Nusum
No.	Date	Venue	Opponent	Score	Result	Competition	Ref.
1	March 19, 2004	Bermuda National Stadium, Devonshire Parish, Bermuda	British Virgin Islands	7–0	9–0	2002 FIFA World Cup qualification	
2	March 19, 2004	Bermuda National Stadium, Devonshire Parish, Bermuda	British Virgin Islands	9–0	9–0	2002 FIFA World Cup qualification	
3	December 26, 2003	Bermuda National Stadium, Devonshire Parish, Bermuda	Barbados	1–2	1–2	Friendly	
4	February 29, 2004	Bermuda National Stadium, Devonshire Parish, Bermuda	Montserrat	2–0	13–0	2006 FIFA World Cup qualification	
5	February 29, 2004	Bermuda National Stadium, Devonshire Parish, Bermuda	Montserrat	9–0	13–0	2006 FIFA World Cup qualification	
6	February 29, 2004	Bermuda National Stadium, Devonshire Parish, Bermuda	Montserrat	10–0	13–0	2006 FIFA World Cup qualification	
7	March 21, 2004	Blakes Estate Stadium, Montserrat	Montserrat	2–0	7–0	2006 FIFA World Cup qualification	
8	March 21, 2004	Blakes Estate Stadium, Montserrat	Montserrat	4–0	7–0	2006 FIFA World Cup qualification	
9	April 2, 2004	Bermuda National Stadium, Devonshire Parish, Bermuda	Nicaragua	1–0	2–1	Friendly	
10	April 2, 2004	Bermuda National Stadium, Devonshire Parish, Bermuda	Nicaragua	2–0	2–1	Friendly	
11	June 13, 2004	Estadio Cuscatlán, San Salvador, El Salvador	El Salvador	1–1	1–2	2006 FIFA World Cup qualification	
12	June 20, 2004	Bermuda National Stadium, Devonshire Parish, Bermuda	El Salvador	2–1	2–2	2006 FIFA World Cup qualification	
13	September 27, 2006	Lionel Roberts Stadium, Charlotte Amalie, U.S. Virgin Islands	U.S. Virgin Islands	4–0	6–0	2007 Caribbean Cup qualification	
14	November 21, 2006	Barbados National Stadium, Saint Michael, Barbados	Bahamas	2–0	4–0	2007 Caribbean Cup qualification	
15	November 23, 2006	Barbados National Stadium, Saint Michael, Barbados	Barbados	1–1	1–1	2007 Caribbean Cup qualification	
16	June 9, 2008	Bermuda National Stadium, Devonshire Parish, Bermuda	Barbados	3–0	3–0	Friendly	
17	June 15, 2008	Marvin Lee Stadium, Macoya, Trinidad and Tobago	Trinidad and Tobago	1–0	2–1	2010 FIFA World Cup qualification	
18	June 15, 2008	Marvin Lee Stadium, Macoya, Trinidad and Tobago	Trinidad and Tobago	2–1	2–1	2010 FIFA World Cup qualification	
19	October 11, 2011	Bermuda National Stadium, Devonshire Parish, Bermuda	Guyana	1–0	1–1	2014 FIFA World Cup qualification	

== Honours ==
Bermuda

- Island Games: 2013
