= Devarr Boyles =

Bermudian footballer and manager

Personal information
- Date of birth: 18 July 1970 (age 56)
- Place of birth: Bermuda
- Height: 5 ft 11 in (1.80 m)
- Position: Midfielder

Team information
- Current team: Bermuda (Manager)

Senior career*
| Years | Team | Apps | (Gls) |
| 2001–2009 | Dandy Town Hornets | | |

International career
| 2000–2001 | Bermuda | 6 | (2) |

Managerial career
- 2010: Devonshire Cougars
- 2011–2012: Bermuda
- 2017–: Bermuda
- * Club domestic league appearances and goals

Devarr Boyles (born 18 July 1970) is a retired Bermudian professional football player and now manager. He has coached Dandy Town Hornets in Bermuda since 2018.

== Club career ==
During the 1990s, he played college soccer for Old Dominion in the United States.

He played for the Dandy Town Hornets.

== International career ==
He made his debut for Bermuda in a May 1999 Caribbean Cup match against Bahamas and earned a total of 6 caps, scoring 2 goals. He has represented his country in 3 FIFA World Cup qualification matches.

His final international match was an April 2000 World Cup qualification match against Antigua and Barbuda.

=== International goals ===
Scores and results list Bermuda's goal tally first.

| N. | Date | Venue | Opponent | Score | Result | Competition |
|---|---|---|---|---|---|---|
| 1. | 7 May 1999 | National Stadium, Hamilton, Bermuda | Cayman Islands | | 4–1 | 1999 Caribbean Cup |
| 2. | 19 March 2000 | National Stadium, Hamilton, Bermuda | British Virgin Islands | 1–0 | 9–0 | 2002 FIFA World Cup qualification |

== Managerial career ==
Since March until June 2010 he was a head coach of the Devonshire Cougars.

Since August 2011 until June 2012 he coached the Bermuda national football team.
