= London Steede-Jackson =

Bermudian footballer

Personal information
- Date of birth: 30 December 1994 (age 31)
- Height: 1.82 m (6 ft 0 in)
- Position: Midfielder

Team information
- Current team: BAA Wanderers

College career
Years	Team	Apps	(Gls)
2013–2016	Thomas College	60	(10)

Senior career*
Years	Team	Apps	(Gls)
2018–	BAA Wanderers		

International career^{‡}
2019–	Bermuda	3	(0)
- * Club domestic league appearances and goals as of 17:48, 8 April 2021 (UTC) ‡ National team caps and goals as of 17:48, 8 April 2021 (UTC)

London Steede-Jackson (born 30 December 1994) is a Bermudian footballer who plays for BAA Wanderers as a midfielder.

== Career ==
Steede-Jackson played college soccer for Thomas College. He began his club career with BAA Wanderers in 2018. He made his international debut for Bermuda in 2019.
