= Fredrick =

Fredrick may refer to:

- Fredrick (given name), a given name
- Fredrick (surname), a surname
- Fredrick (2016 film)

== See also ==
- Frederick (disambiguation)
- Fredricks
