= Antwan Russell =

Bermudian footballer (born 1986)

Personal information
- Date of birth: 6 November 1986 (age 39)
- Place of birth: Hamilton, Bermuda
- Height: 5 ft 9 in (1.75 m)
- Position: Forward

Team information
- Current team: Paget Lions

Youth career
- PHC Zebras

Senior career*
Years	Team	Apps	(Gls)
2007–2008	PHC Zebras		
2008–2009	Dandy Town Hornets		
2009–2012	Bermuda Hogges	32	(5)
2009–2010	Southampton Rangers		
2011–2012	PHC Zebras		
2013–2014	Ilkeston	18	(4)
2014–2021	Robin Hood		
2021–2022	PHC Zebras		
2022–	Paget Lions		

International career
2011–2015	Bermuda	11	(7)
Medal record
Men's football
Representing Bermuda
Island Games
Winner	2013 Bermudas
- * Club domestic league appearances and goals as of 12 March 2014

Antwan Russell (born 6 November 1986) is a Bermudian professional footballer who plays as a forward for Paget Lions.

== Club career ==
Russell began his career with PHC Zebras, before moving to Dandy Town Hornets he also had stints with Robin Hood and Somerset Eagles in the Bermudian Premier Division before joining the Bermuda Hogges in the USL Second Division in 2009. He also moved to Southampton Rangers in the local league in 2009.

Russell was involved in a serious controversy in August 2012 when boy hood club PHC Zebras attempted to block his transfer to newly promoted club Robin Hood FC. In April 2013, he moved to English Northern Premier League Premier Division side Ilkeston.

== International career ==
Russell made his debut for Bermuda in an October 2011 World Cup qualification match against Trinidad and Tobago and has, as of November 2015, earned a total of eight caps, scoring five goals. He has represented his country in three FIFA World Cup qualification matches.

== Personal life ==
Antwan's brother Tokia Russell also played for Bermuda.

== Career statistics ==
=== Club ===
Appearances and goals by club, season and competition
Club	Season	League			FA Cup		Other		Total	
Club	Season	Division	Apps	Goals	Apps	Goals	Apps	Goals	Apps	Goals
Ilkeston	2012–13	Northern Premier League Premier Division	6	3	0	0	1 (Note: Appearance(s) in Derbyshire Senior Cup)	0	7	3
Ilkeston	2013–14	Northern Premier League Premier Division	12	1	0	0	2 (Note: One appearance in Derbyshire Senior Cup; one appearance in Northern Premier League Challenge Cup)	0	14	1
Ilkeston	Total		18	4	0	0	3	0	21	4
Career total			18	4	0	0	3	0	21	4

=== International ===
Scores and results list Bermuda's goal tally first, score column indicates score after each Russell goal.

List of international goals scored by Antwan Russell
No.	Date	Venue	Opponent	Score	Result	Competition
1	7 October 2011	Bermuda National Stadium, Hamilton, Bermuda	Trinidad and Tobago	1–0	2–1	2014 FIFA World Cup qualification
2	7 September 2012	Stade Sylvio Cator, Port-au-Prince, Haiti	Puerto Rico	1–1	1–2	2012 Caribbean Cup qualification
3	9 September 2012	Stade Sylvio Cator, Port-au-Prince, Haiti	Haiti	1–0	1–3	2012 Caribbean Cup qualification
4	11 September 2012	Stade Sylvio Cator, Port-au-Prince, Haiti	Saint Martin	4–0	8–0	2012 Caribbean Cup qualification
5	14 July 2013	Bermuda National Stadium, Hamilton, Bermuda	Greenland	2–0	3–0	2013 Island Games
6	15 July 2013	Bermuda National Stadium, Hamilton, Bermuda	Falkland Islands	1–0	8–0	2013 Island Games
7	8 March 2015	Bermuda National Stadium, Hamilton, Bermuda	Grenada	1–0	2–0	Friendly

== Honours ==
Bermuda

- Island Games: 2013
