= Kenny Thompson (Bermudian footballer) =

Bermudian football manager

Personal information
- Date of birth: 3 February 1956 (age 70)
- Place of birth: Bermuda

Managerial career
- Years: Team
- 2003–2008: Bermuda
- 2010: Bermuda

Kenny Thompson (born 3 February 1956) is a Bermudian professional football manager.

== Career ==
In 2003–2008 and since August until October 2010 he coached the Bermuda national football team.
