= Marco Warren =

Bermudian footballer (1993–2023)

Personal information
- Date of birth: 13 December 1993
- Place of birth: Warwick Parish, Bermuda
- Date of death: 14 May 2023 (aged 29)
- Place of death: Hamilton Parish, Bermuda
- Height: 5 ft 4 in (1.63 m)
- Positions: Midfielder; striker

Youth career
- 2008–2011: Montverde Academy

College career
Years	Team	Apps	(Gls)
2012–2014	Flagler Saints	48	(9)

Senior career*
Years	Team	Apps	(Gls)
2014–2023	PHC Zebras		

International career
2012	Bermuda U-20	3	(0)
2015–2019	Bermuda	10	(1)
Medal record
Men's football
Representing Bermuda
Island Games
Winner	2013 Bermudas
- * Club domestic league appearances and goals

Marco Warren (13 December 1993 – 14 May 2023) was a Bermudian footballer who played as a midfielder. He capped for the Bermuda national team.

== Career ==
Marco Warren was born in Warwick Parish, Bermuda. He started his career at Flagler College, where he originally studied Graphic Design as well as receiving a sports scholarship. He began to play for the college team in 2012, known as the Flagler Saints, who were then playing in the NCAA Division II. In his first season, he played in all of the 19 available games and scored 1 goal. He also appeared in all the available games for the 2013 season, this time getting 7 goals in 19 games. For his final college season in 2014 he played 10 games and scored 1 goal. In total in three years for Flagler Saints he played in 48 games, scoring 9 goals. After leaving college at the end of 2014, he joined Bermudian Premier Division side PHC Zebras.

== International career ==
In 2012 Warren played three games for the Bermuda U20 national team in the 2012 CONCACAF Gold Cup, his debut coming in a 2–0 loss against Barbados U-20.

Warren made his debut for the senior national team on 8 March 2015 in a 3–0 victory over Grenada. He got an assist and was only stopped from scoring on his debut by a last ditch tackle from a Grenada defender. He went on to receive nine official caps for Bermuda.

== Personal life and death ==
Warren was the son of former Bermuda national footballer and Boulevard Blazers midfielder Dwight Warren. He had two sisters, and listed Ronaldinho as his favourite footballer.

Warren was killed in a hit-and-run collision on 14 May 2023, aged 29. He was discovered with severe head injuries on North Shore Road in Hamilton Parish and died a short time later at King Edward VII Memorial Hospital.

Months following the fatal collision, Warren's family (aided by the Bermuda Police Service) plead with the public for any information surrounding his death. Shortly thereafter, former local Senator and Junior Minister for Health, National Security and Transport, Curtis Richardson, was charged with causing the death of Marco Warren by driving without due care and attention. Senior magistrate Maxanne Anderson released Mr. Richardson on $25,000 bail with surety and the matter is set to return to the courts in December 2023.

== Honours ==
Bermuda

- Island Games: 2013
