= Kevin Richards (footballer) =

Bermudian footballer (born 1981)

Personal information
- Full name: Kevin Richards
- Date of birth: 23 December 1981 (age 44)
- Place of birth: Warwick, Bermuda
- Height: 5 ft 8 in (1.73 m)
- Position: Defender

Team information
- Current team: PHC Zebras

College career
Years	Team	Apps	(Gls)
2000–2003	Notre Dame Fighting Irish	79	(2)

Senior career*
Years	Team	Apps	(Gls)
2006	PHC Zebras		
2007	Bermuda Hogges	6	(1)
2007–2008	PHC Zebras		
2008	Bermuda Hogges	15	(1)
2008–2009	PHC Zebras		
2009	Bermuda Hogges	17	(2)
2015–	PHC Zebras		

International career
2004–2008	Bermuda	20	(0)
- * Club domestic league appearances and goals as of 11 October 2009

Kevin Richards (born 23 December 1981) is a Bermudian football player who plays for PHC Zebras.

== Career ==
=== College ===
Richards played college soccer at University of Notre Dame in the United States from 2000 to 2003. Richards was a Big East Academic All-Star in 2002–2003 and one of the team captains in 2003.

=== Club ===
Richards was drafted to Major League Soccer team Colorado Rapids as the 35th overall pick in the 2004 MLS SuperDraft. In 2004, he also had international trials at Ross County in the Scottish First Division, in France with Angoulême, and in England at Barnet. In 2008, he had a further trial in England at Queens Park Rangers of the Football League Championship.

Richards began his professional career in his native Bermuda in 2006, playing for PHC Zebras in the Bermudian Premier Division, helping the Zebras to the BFA Championship in 2008. Richards received the Most Valuable Player for the Premier Division as well as the Defensive Player of the Year award in 2007–2008.

He has also played with the Bermuda Hogges of the USL Second Division for their first season in 2007. Richards was a starter on the squad for 2 seasons. He returned to Zebras as player coach in 2015.

=== International ===
He made his debut for Bermuda in a February 2004 friendly match against Trinidad and Tobago and earned a total of 20 caps, scoring no goals. He has represented his country in 6 FIFA World Cup qualification matches. He played in both of Bermuda's qualifying games against El Salvador for the 2006 FIFA World Cup, and in all four of Bermuda's qualifying games for the 2010 FIFA World Cup, including their 3–1 victory over the Cayman Islands on 30 March 2008, and their historic 2–1 victory over Trinidad and Tobago on 15 June 2008.

His final international match was a June 2008 World Cup qualification match against the Trinidad and Tobago.

== Personal life ==
He was appointed new business development manager at the Bermuda Business Development Agency in September 2015, after working for four years with General Electric.
