= Marlon Rojas =

Trinidadian footballer (born 1979)

Personal information
- Full name: Marlon Rojas
- Date of birth: November 11, 1979 (age 46)
- Place of birth: Arima, Trinidad and Tobago
- Height: 5 ft 8 in (1.73 m)
- Position: Defender

Team information
- Current team: Somerset Eagles (player/coach)

College career
Years	Team	Apps	(Gls)
2000	St. John's Red Storm		
2001–2002	Tampa Spartans		

Senior career*
Years	Team	Apps	(Gls)
2003	Police FC		
2004	Joe Public		
2005	Real Salt Lake	7	(0)
2006	Atlanta Silverbacks	9	(0)
2009	Bermuda Hogges	1	(0)
2010–present	Somerset Eagles		

International career
2004–2005	Trinidad and Tobago	23	(0)
- * Club domestic league appearances and goals as of 11 October 2009

Marlon Rojas (born November 11, 1979, in Arima) is a Trinidadian footballer who currently is a player/coach at Bermudian side Somerset Eagles.

== Career ==
=== College ===
Rojas came to the United States to play college soccer, first with St. John's University, and then the University of Tampa, with whom he won the NCAA Division II Championship in 2001.

=== Professional ===
Upon graduating college, Rojas went back to Trinidad to play for Joe Public, before signing with Real Salt Lake prior to team's inaugural season in 2005. He only lasted with the team until June. Rojas also played a season with the Atlanta Silverbacks of the USL First Division in 2006

Rojas joined the Bermuda Hogges of the USL Second Division in 2009, and in doing so became the first non-Bermudian player in club history. In summer 2010 Rojas was named player/coach of Bermudian side Somerset Eagles.

=== International ===
Rojas has played for the Trinidad and Tobago national team on various youth levels and has been a member of the squad during World Cup 2006 qualifiers. He currently has 23 caps.
