= Meshach Wade =

Bermudian footballer

Personal information
- Full name: Meshach Wade
- Date of birth: January 23, 1973 (age 53)
- Place of birth: Smith's, Bermuda
- Position: Midfielder

Senior career*
Years	Team	Apps	(Gls)
1989–1990	Devonshire Cougars		
1990–1991	PHC Zebras		
1991–1993	Hereford United	17	(0)
1993–1994	PHC Zebras	13	(4)
1994–1997	BAA Wanderers	23	(8)
1997–1999	Vasco Volcanoes	28	(12)
1999–2002	Harrisburg Heat	72	(16)
2002–2004	Southampton Rangers		
2004–2005	Boulevard Blazers	1	(2)
2005–2006	Southampton Rangers		
2006–2007	Somerset Trojans		(0)
2007–2008	Hamilton Parish		(1)
2008–2009	Dandy Town Hornets		(0)

International career
1991–2008	Bermuda	31	(3)

Managerial career
- 2007–2008: Hamilton Parish
- 2008–2009: Dandy Town Hornets
- * Club domestic league appearances and goals

Meshach Wade (born 23 January 1973) is a retired Bermudian football player.

== Club career ==
Wade played two seasons for Hereford United, alongside compatriot Kentoine Jennings, in the English Football League before returning to PHC Zebras in Bermuda in 1993. He had a few seasons in US Indoor soccer with Harrisburg Heat alongside another Bermudian, David Bascome, and then played for Southampton Rangers and became player/coach at Hamilton Parish and player/coach at Dandy Town Hornets F.C. in summer 2008.

He was replaced as Hornets' coach after suffering career-threatening injuries in a bike accident in February 2009.

== International career ==
A national team stalwart for almost 20 years, Wade made his debut for Bermuda in the sensational 1991 friendly win against the United States and has earned over 30 caps, scoring 3 goals. He has represented his country in 18 FIFA World Cup qualification matches.

His final international match was a June 2008 World Cup qualification match against Trinidad and Tobago.

=== International goals ===
Scores and results list Bermuda's goal tally first.

N.	Date	Venue	Opponent	Score	Result	Competition	Refs
1.	5 May 1999	National Stadium, Hamilton, Bermuda	Bahamas	5–0	6–0	1999 Caribbean Cup qualification	
2.	19 March 2000	National Stadium, Hamilton, Bermuda	British Virgin Islands	3–0	9–0	2002 FIFA World Cup qualification	
3.	29 February 2004	National Stadium, Hamilton, Bermuda	Montserrat	11–0	13–0	2006 FIFA World Cup qualification	
