= Michael Parsons (Bermudian footballer) =

Bermudian footballer

Personal information
- Full name: Michael Parsons
- Date of birth: August 6, 1979 (age 47)
- Place of birth: Bermuda
- Height: 5 ft 10 in (1.78 m)
- Position: Defender

Team information
- Current team: Bermuda Hogges
- Number: 18

Senior career*
Years	Team	Apps	(Gls)
2003–2004	Boulevard Blazers		
2004–2006	Dandy Town Hornets		
2007–	Bermuda Hogges	17	(0)

International career
2006	Bermuda	1	(0)
- * Club domestic league appearances and goals as of 11 October 2009

Michael Parsons (born August 6, 1979) is a Bermudian soccer player who currently plays for Bermuda Hogges in the USL Second Division.

== Career ==
=== Club ===
Parsons played in the Bermudian Premier Division for both Boulevard Blazers and the Dandy Town Hornets before joining the Bermuda Hogges in the USL Second Division in 2007.
