= Luke Robinson (Bermudan footballer) =

Bermudan footballer

- Robinson playing for Whitehawk in 2023

Personal information
- Date of birth: 20 October 1998 (age 28)
- Place of birth: Bermuda
- Position: Forward

Team information
- Current team: Glacis United
- Number: 18

Youth career
- Hove Rivervale
- Denton & South Heighton
- 2014–2015: Southampton Second Chance Programme
- 2015–2016: Brighton & Hove Albion
- 2016: Peacehaven & Telscombe

Senior career*
Years	Team	Apps	(Gls)
2016–2017	Peacehaven & Telscombe		
2017	Lewes	0	(0)
2018	Bognor Regis Town	0	(0)
2018–2020	Haywards Heath Town	8	(0)
2020–2021	Staines Town	7	(3)
2021	Horsham	5	(0)
2021	Haywards Heath Town	12	(4)
2021–2023	Worthing	7	(2)
2022	→ Bognor Regis Town (joint registration)	10	(0)
2022–2023	→ Whitehawk (joint registration)	19	(6)
2023	Whitehawk	5	(1)
2023–2024	Glacis United	11	(2)
2024	Whitehawk	0	(0)
2024	Chatham Town	0	(0)
2024	Lancing	9	(2)
2024–2026	Whitehawk	6	(1)
2026–	Glacis United	3	(0)

International career^{‡}
2021–	Bermuda	20	(0)
- * Club domestic league appearances and goals as of 20:20 1 November 2026 (UTC) ‡ National team caps and goals as of 25 March 2024 (UTC)

Luke Robinson (born 20 October 1998) is a Bermudian footballer who plays as a forward for Glacis United and for the Bermuda national team. Robinson originally moved to England at the age of seven.

== Club career ==
After coming through the Southampton Second Chance Programme and Brighton & Hove Albion's academy, Robinson's career started with Peacehaven & Telscombe, followed by brief spells at Lewes and Bognor Regis Town before a serious knee injury restricted his appearances at Haywards Heath Town.

Robinson joined Staines Town for the 2020–2021 season. He scored a hat-trick in a 4–4 draw with South Park on 17 October 2020 and was named Supporters' Player of the Season.

Robinson made his international debut for Bermuda against Surinam on 4 June 2021 in a World Cup qualifier, and started again against Cayman Islands four days later. He has also appeared in the Gold Cup.

Robinson joined Horsham on 30 July 2021 after impressing in pre-season. Robinson then re-signed for Haywards Heath Town, before moving to Worthing in December 2021 and then signing joint registration forms with Bognor Regis Town on 15 August 2022.

On 17 December 2022 Robinson ended his joint registration with Bognor Regis Town and joined Whitehawk, scoring on his debut at Three Bridges, followed by a stoppage time winner against Haywards Heath Town. Robinson signed permanently for Whitehawk in June 2023, but left shortly afterwards to sign a professional contract with Glacis United in Gibraltar.

In June 2024, Robinson was announced to have returned to Whitehawk, before joining Chatham Town the following week. Having failed to make an appearance, he joined Lancing in August 2024 and became the second international player to earn a cap whilst at the club after Knorry Scott, before returning to Whitehawk in October 2024.

Robinson suffered a serious knee injury while playing for Whitehawk against Carshalton Athletic in January 2025. He was subsequently diagnosed with a cruciate ligament injury to the same knee he injured in 2019, running in the Brighton marathon in April 2025, as part of his preparation for surgery.

Robinson re-signed for Whitehawk in March 2026.

== Career statistics ==
=== Club ===
As of 29 August 2023

Appearances and goals by club, season and competition
Club	Season	League			FA Cup (Note: Includes preliminary rounds)		Other		Total	
Club	Season	Division	Apps	Goals	Apps	Goals	Apps	Goals	Apps	Goals
Bognor Regis Town	2017–18	National League South	0	0	0	0	0	0	0	0
Haywards Heath Town	2018–19	Isthmian League	8	0	0	0	3 (Note: Two appearances in FA Trophy qualification, one appearance in the Sussex Senior Challenge Cup)	0	11	0
Haywards Heath Town	2019–20	Isthmian League	0	0	0	0	0	0	0	0
Staines Town	2020–21	Isthmian League	7	3	2	0	0	0	9	3
Horsham	2021–22	Isthmian League	5	0	2	0	0	0	7	0
Haywards Heath Town	2021–22	Isthmian League	12	4	2	0	3 (Note: One appearance in FA Trophy qualification, one appearance in the Sussex Senior Challenge Cup and one appearance in the Alan Turvey Trophy)	0	17	4
Worthing	2021–22	Isthmian League	7	0	0	0	0	0	7	0
Bognor Regis Town	2022–23	Isthmian League	9	0	0	0	0	0	9	0
Whitehawk	2022–23	Isthmian League	24	7	0	0	2	1	26	8
Career total			72	14	6	0	8	1	86	15

=== International ===
As of matches played 25 March 2024

National team	Year	Apps	Goals
Bermuda	2021	3	0
Bermuda	2022	2	0
Bermuda	2023	6	0
Bermuda	2024	9	0
Total		20	0

== Honours ==
Whitehawk

- Isthmian League South East Division: 2022–23 (play-off final winners)
