= Darius Cox =

Bermudian footballer (born 1983)

Personal information
- Full name: Darius Cox
- Date of birth: March 16, 1983 (age 43)
- Place of birth: Bermuda
- Height: 6 ft 0 in (1.83 m)
- Position: Defender

Team information
- Current team: Robin Hood

Senior career*
Years	Team	Apps	(Gls)
2004–2015	Devonshire Cougars	202	(40)
2007–2012	Bermuda Hogges	77	(2)
2011	CBU Capers		
2015–	Robin Hood		

International career^{‡}
2006–2012	Bermuda	20	(1)
- * Club domestic league appearances and goals as of November 14, 2011 ‡ National team caps and goals as of June 25, 2010

Darius Cox (born March 16, 1983) is a Bermudian footballer who currently plays for Bermudian Premier Division side Robin Hood.

== Club career ==
Cox began his career with Devonshire Cougars and played for the team for several years in the Bermudian Premier Division, helping the team to the BPD Championship in 2007. He was a part of the treble winning team in Bermudian Premier Division.

Cox has been part of the Bermuda Hogges squad in the USL Second Division since the team's inaugural season in 2007 and has been one of the first-choice defenders throughout his seasons with the team. Cox has also played 13 games for CBU Capers of the CIS in the 2011–12 season.

Cox joined Robin Hood from Cougars in November 2015.

== International career ==
He made his debut for Bermuda in a September 2006 Caribbean Cup qualification match against the US Virgin Islands and earned a total of 20 caps, scoring 1 goal. He has represented his country in 2 FIFA World Cup qualification matches. He played in two of Bermuda's qualifying games for the 2010 FIFA World Cup, including their 3–1 victory over the Cayman Islands on March 30, 2008.

His final international match was a September 2012 Caribbean Cup match against Saint Martin.

=== International goals ===
Scores and results list Bermuda's goal tally first.

N.	Date	Venue	Opponent	Score	Result	Competition	Ref
1.	29 September 2006	Lionel Roberts Stadium, Charlotte Amalie, U.S. Virgin Islands	Dominican Republic	2–0	3–1	2007 Caribbean Cup qualification	
