= Tyrell Burgess =

Bermudian footballer (born 1986)

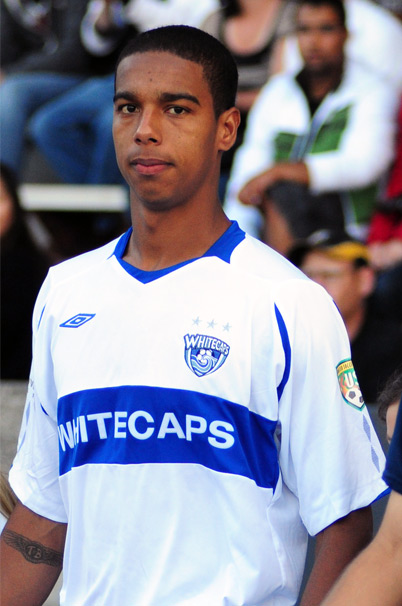
- Tyrell Burgess playing for Vancouver Whitecaps in 2009

Personal information
- Full name: Tyrell Allan Burgess
- Date of birth: 5 March 1986 (age 40)
- Place of birth: Smith's Parish, Bermuda
- Height: 6 ft 2 in (1.88 m)
- Position: Midfielder

Team information
- Current team: St. Georges FC
- Number: 4

Youth career
- 2006: Rhode Island Anchormen
- 2007–2008: Lynn Fighting Knights

Senior career*
Years	Team	Apps	(Gls)
2007–2008	Reading Rage	16	(5)
2009	Vancouver Whitecaps	23	(1)
2010	North Village Rams	1	(0)
2010	Bermuda Hogges	7	(0)
2010–2012	North Village Rams		
2012	Bermuda Hogges	7	(0)
2013–	St. Geo.		

International career^{‡}
2003–2005	Bermuda U17	10	(2)
2005–2008	Bermuda U20	7	(0)
2006–	Bermuda	26	(7)
Medal record
Men's football
Representing Bermuda
Island Games
Winner	2013 Bermudas
- * Club domestic league appearances and goals as of July 1, 2012 ‡ National team caps and goals as of January 31, 2017

Tyrell Allen Burgess (born 5 March 1986) is a Bermudian footballer, currently playing for North Village Rams.

== Career ==
=== College and amateur ===
Born on 5 March 1986, in Smith's Parish, Burgess began his career at North Village CC, before moving from his native Bermuda to Wilbraham, Massachusetts when he was 16 to attend the Wilbraham & Monson Academy. He played college soccer at NCAA Division III Rhode Island College in 2006, helping the Anchormen to an Eastern College Athletic Conference New England title with four goals and five assists in 18 matches. He transferred to Lynn University in 2007, where he was named to the NCAA Division II All-Sunshine State Conference (SSC) First Team as a senior. In total, Burgess tallied 14 goals and added 14 assists in 53 games for Lynn.

During his college years Burgess also played for Reading Rage in the USL Premier Development League, helping the team capture the 2008 Mid Atlantic Division regular season title, as well as the Eastern Conference playoff title.

=== Professional ===
Burgess joined the Vancouver Whitecaps FC of the USL First Division on January 30, 2009, after impressing during an open player combine held in Palmyra, Pennsylvania in December 2008. Burgess played in 23 games and scored one goal in his debut season, before being released by the Whitecaps on November 27, 2009.

Burgess returned to his home country in 2010 when he signed to play with the Bermuda Hogges in the USL Premier Development League.

In June 2010, Burgess was invited to spend a trial period with English Conference National side Gateshead. Burgess wasn't offered a contract by Gateshead, despite scoring the winner in a pre-season friendly against Harrogate Town.

=== International ===
Burgess is a full member of Bermuda national football team and has represented his country in 12 FIFA World Cup qualification matches. He scored his first goal for the senior side in a 1–1 draw with the Cayman Islands during 2010 FIFA World Cup qualifying game on March 30, 2008. Burgess has also played for Bermuda's U-17 and U-20 national teams.

==== International goals ====
No.	Date	Venue	Opponent	Score	Result	Competition	Ref.
1.	3 February 2008	Bermuda National Stadium, Devonshire Parish, Bermuda	Cayman Islands	1–0	1–0	2010 FIFA World Cup qualification	
2.	11 September 2012	Stade Sylvio Cator, Port-au-Prince, Haiti	Saint Martin	1–0	8–0	2012 Caribbean Cup qualification	
3.	11 September 2012	Stade Sylvio Cator, Port-au-Prince, Haiti	Saint Martin	2–0	8–0	2012 Caribbean Cup qualification	
4.	11 September 2012	Stade Sylvio Cator, Port-au-Prince, Haiti	Saint Martin	3–0	8–0	2012 Caribbean Cup qualification	
5.	11 September 2012	Stade Sylvio Cator, Port-au-Prince, Haiti	Saint Martin	6–0	8–0	2012 Caribbean Cup qualification	
6.	15 July 2013	Bermuda National Stadium, Devonshire Parish, Bermuda	Falkland Islands	7–0	8–0	2013 Island Games	
7.	29 March 2015	Bermuda National Stadium, Devonshire Parish, Bermuda	Bahamas	2–0	3–0	2018 FIFA World Cup qualification	

== Honours ==
Bermuda

- Island Games: 2013
