= Maurice Lowe =

Bermudan football manager

Personal information
- Place of birth: Bermuda
- Position: Defender

International career
Years	Team	Apps	(Gls)
2004–2005	Bermuda	4	(1)

Managerial career
- 2011–2012: Bermuda Hogges
- 2013–2015: Southampton Rangers S.C.
- 2026: Bermuda (caretaker)

Maurice Lowe (born in Bermuda) is a Bermudan football manager.

As of 2024, Lowe serves as the technical development director of Bermuda Football Association.

== Career statistics ==
=== International ===
Appearances and goals by national team and year
National team	Year	Apps	Goals
Bermuda	2004	3	1
Bermuda	2005	1	0
Total		4	1

Scores and results list Bermuda's goal tally first, score column indicates score after each Lowe goal.

List of international goals scored by Maurice Lowe
No.	Date	Venue	Opponent	Score	Result	Competition
1	26 November 2004	Arnos Vale Stadium, Arnos Vale, Saint Vincent and the Grenadines	Saint Vincent and the Grenadines	2–3	3–3	2005 Caribbean Cup qualification
