= Kevin Richards (radio broadcaster) =

American broadcaster and music promoter

- Occupation(s): Broadcaster, promoter
- Website: www.kevinrichards.com

Kevin Richards is a country radio broadcaster and country music promoter. Richards won a national Country Music Association (CMA) Award as medium market radio personality of the year in 2006. In all, he has earned 6 national CMA Award nominations since 2000, and one nod from the Academy of Country Music (ACM) in 2014.

== Biography ==
Richards was invited by the CMA to host and produce the CMA Heritage Artist Panels at the CMA Music Festival in 2013. He worked with Webster and Associates Public Relations to book, host, and produce a groundbreaking reunion of CMA winners from the 1970s, 1980s and 1990s on the CMA Close Up stage at Nashville's Music City Center.

Richards began his broadcasting career at age 12 on WSCG in Corinth, New York. After winning a contest on the radio, he applied for a child actor's permit to legally work on the air after school. After working at several Northeast Country Stations, and a stint on Sirius Radio, Richards works for 100.9 The Cat, and Froggy 100.3, in the Albany and Glens Falls, New York markets.

In addition to his radio shows, Richards has hosted and produced country-themed events throughout the US.

Richards launched a classic country concert series in Upstate New York in 2008. He continues to assist in promoting and hosting classic country concerts all over the Northeast. Richards also hosts classic country segments for television specials airing on WMHT/PBS.
