= Domico Coddington =

Bermudian footballer (born 1984)

Personal information
- Full name: Domico Coddington
- Date of birth: May 24, 1984 (age 42)
- Place of birth: Bermuda
- Height: 5 ft 6 in (1.68 m)
- Position: Midfielder

Team information
- Current team: Devonshire Cougars

Senior career*
Years	Team	Apps	(Gls)
2003–2015	Devonshire Cougars		
2003–2004	Durham Storm		
2004–2005	Oakville Blue Devils		
2007–2009	Bermuda Hogges	34	(5)
2011–2012	Bermuda Hogges	18	(6)

International career^{‡}
2003–2013	Bermuda	26	(2)
Medal record
Men's football
Representing Bermuda
Island Games
Winner	2013 Bermudas
- * Club domestic league appearances and goals as of April 21, 2013 ‡ National team caps and goals as of 27 December 2015

Domico Coddington (born May 24, 1984) is a Bermudian football player, who currently plays for local side Devonshire Cougars.

== Career ==
=== Club ===
Coddington began his career with Devonshire Cougars, and played for the team for four years in the Bermudian Premier Division before joining the Bermuda Hogges in the USL Second Division in 2007. He had earlier had spells in Canada with Durham Storm and Oakville Blue Devils.

=== International ===
He made his debut for Bermuda in a December 2003 friendly match against Barbados and earned a total of 26 caps, scoring 2 goals. He has represented his country in 5 FIFA World Cup qualification matches. He played in one of Bermuda's qualifying games for the 2006 FIFA World Cup, and in two of Bermuda's qualifying games for the 2010 FIFA World Cup, including their 1-1 tiw with the Cayman Islands on February 3, 2008.

His final international match was a September 2012 Caribbean Cup match against Saint Martin.

=== International goals ===
Scores and results list Bermuda's goal tally first.

N.	Date	Venue	Opponent	Score	Result	Competition	Reference
1.	27 September 2006	Lionel Roberts Stadium, Charlotte Amalie, U.S. Virgin Islands	U.S. Virgin Islands	2–0	6–0	2007 Caribbean Cup	
2.	27 September 2006	Lionel Roberts Stadium, Charlotte Amalie, U.S. Virgin Islands	U.S. Virgin Islands	5–0	6–0	2007 Caribbean Cup	

== Honours ==
Bermuda

- Island Games: 2013
