= Jason Davis (footballer) =

Bermudian footballer

Personal information
- Date of birth: 6 November 1984 (age 42)
- Height: 1.79 m (5 ft 10 1/2 in)
- Position: Midfielder

Team information
- Current team: North Village Rams

Senior career*
Years	Team	Apps	(Gls)
2005–2007	Wolves		
2007–2011	CBU Capers		
2010–2011	Boulevard Blazers		
2011–	North Village Rams		

International career^{‡}
2007–2008	Bermuda	7	(1)
- * Club domestic league appearances and goals as of 21:25, 19 June 2012 (UTC) ‡ National team caps and goals as of 21:25, 19 June 2012 (UTC)

Jason Davis (born 6 November 1984) is a Bermudian international footballer who plays for the North Village Rams, as a midfielder.

== Club career ==
Davis played club football in Bermuda for Wolves before playing college soccer for CBU Capers. He played with North Village Rams during the 2011–12 season after joining them from Boulevard.

He was suspended for two games and handed a 12-month probation after a violent altercation with Dandy Town Hornets player Zaire Burchall in April 2014. The incident saw Hornets' goalkeeper Treadwell Gibbons being suspended from football for a stunning 5 years.

== International career ==
He earned seven caps for Bermuda between 2007 and 2008, which included playing in one FIFA World Cup qualifying match in February 2008. He also appeared in 2008 Caribbean Championship qualification matches.
