= Fredrick (surname) =

Fredrick is a surname. Notable people with the surname include:

- Norton Fredrick (1937–2011), Sri Lankan cricketer
- Zam Fredrick (born 1959), American basketball player
