= Kwame Steede =

Bermudian footballer and coach

Personal information
- Date of birth: 4 July 1980 (age 46)
- Height: 1.80 m (5 ft 11 in)
- Position: Midfielder

Team information
- Current team: Devonshire Cougars (head coach)

Senior career*
Years	Team	Apps	(Gls)
2003–2007	Devonshire Cougars		
2007–2008	Bermuda Hogges	23	(2)
2008–2011	Devonshire Cougars		
2011	Bermuda Hogges	7	(2)

International career
2003–2011	Bermuda	21	(6)

Managerial career
- 2015–: Devonshire Cougars
- * Club domestic league appearances and goals

Kwame Steede (born 4 July 1980) is a Bermudian football coach and former player. He was appointed head coach of the Devonshire Cougars in 2015.

== Club career ==
Before his local league career at Devonshire Cougars, Steede had played for Bermuda Hogges in the USL Premier Development League, as a midfielder.

== International career ==
Steede made his senior international debut for Bermuda in December 2003, in a friendly match against Barbados. He earned a total of 21 caps, scoring 6 goals. He has represented his country in 8 FIFA World Cup qualification matches.

== Managerial career ==
Steede was named head coach of Devonshire Cougars in summer 2015, succeeding Andrew Bascome.
