= Carlos Smith (footballer) =

Bahamian footballer

Personal information
- Date of birth: 11 April 1969 (age 57)
- Position: Goalkeeper

International career
| Years | Team | Apps | (Gls) |
| 2001–2003 | Bahamas | | |

Carlos Smith (born 11 April 1969) is a Bahamian football player. He has played for Bahamas national team.
