= Football at the 2013 Island Games – Men's tournament =

Men's Football at the Island Games 2013
Tournament details
- Host country: Bermuda
- Dates: 14–18 July
- Teams: 4
- Venue: 2 (in 1 host city)

Final positions
- Champions: Bermuda (1st title)
- Runners-up: Greenland
- Third place: Falkland Islands
- Fourth place: Frøya

Tournament statistics
- Matches played: 8
- Goals scored: 50 (6.25 per match)
- Top scorer(s): (Greenland) Norsaq Lund Mathæussen (5 goals)

Football was contested as part of the programme for the 2013 Island Games which was hosted in Bermuda from 14 to 18 July 2013. It was the 13th edition of the men's football tournament at the multi-sport event organised by the International Island Games Association and the first to be held outside of Europe.

The football tournament began with the first matches in the group stage on 14 July 2013 and ended with the medal matches on 18 July 2013. Hosts Bermuda and Greenland contested the final. Bermuda defeated Greenland 1–0 to win the gold medal. In the bronze medal match, the Falkland Islands defeated Frøya 6–0.

== Background ==
Football had been part of the Island Games programme following the debut of a senior men's competition at the 1989 Island Games in the Faroe Islands. Previously, a five-a-side youth football tournament was held at the inaugural games in 1985 held in Douglas, Isle of Man but football was completely absent from the programme at the 1987 Island Games held in Guernsey. The 2013 Island Games would be the first held outside of Europe.

Jersey held the record for gold medals having won the men's football tournament three times. The Isle of Wight were the defending champions after defeating Guernsey 4–2 after extra time in the gold medal match as hosts at the 2011 Island Games. However, they were unable to defend their title as they did not send a team to the 2013 edition.

== Format ==
A total of four teams took part in the competition. In the group phase, the four teams would contest a single round robin group. The winner and the runner-up would contest the gold medal match and the teams placing third and fourth would contest the bronze medal match.

=== Participants ===
- Bermuda
- Falkland Islands
- Frøya
- Greenland

== Group phase ==
Bermuda won the group and Greenland finished second to progress to the gold medal match.

Pos	Team	Pld	W	D	L	GF	GA	GD	Pts	Qualification
1	Bermuda	3	3	0	0	19	0	+19	6	Qualification for gold medal match
2	Greenland	3	2	0	1	21	3	+18	4	Qualification for gold medal match
3	Falkland Islands	3	1	0	2	2	18	−16	2	Qualification for bronze medal match
4	Frøya	3	0	0	3	1	22	−21	0	Qualification for bronze medal match

14 July
20:00

Bermuda	3–0	Greenland
Coddington 10'; Russell 51'; Lewis 58'

Bermuda National Stadium, Hamilton

14 July
20:00

Frøya	1–2	Falkland Islands
Biggs 60' (o.g.)		Clement 12'; Sotomayor 63'

Bermuda Athletics Association, Hamilton

15 July
20:00

Bermuda	8–0	Falkland Islands
Russell 6'; Ming 12'; Coddington 31'; Lewis 38', 73'; R. Simons 57', 84'; Burgess 78'

Bermuda National Stadium, Hamilton

15 July
20:00

Greenland	12–0	Frøya
J. L. Broberg 2', 57'; A. H. Petersen 9'; Lundblad 17'; P. Petersen 27'; N. L. Mathæussen 33', 70', 80'; K. L. Mathæussen 47', 52'; Johansen 73' (o.g.); L. P. Broberg 87'

Bermuda Athletics Association, Hamilton

17 July
18:00

Falkland Islands	0–9	Greenland
		N. L. Mathæussen 5', 8'; Stephensen 20'; Bidstrup 38', 61'; Birch 42'; Maqe 57'; J. L. Broberg 59'; P. Petersen 63'

Bermuda National Stadium, Hamilton

17 July
20:00

Bermuda	8–0	Frøya
L. Simmons 30', 73', 81'; A. Simmons 33', 62', 86'; R. Simons 49'; Warren 67'

Bermuda National Stadium, Hamilton

== Bronze medal match ==
The Falkland Islands defeated Frøya in the bronze medal match.

18 July
18:00

Falkland Islands	6–0	Frøya
Gilson-Clarke 4'; Balladares 27'; Elbakidze 74', 77'; Clark 80'; Thain 87'

BAA Goose Gosling Field, Hamilton

== Gold medal match ==
Bermuda defeated Greenland in the gold medal match.

18 July
20:00

Bermuda	1–0	Greenland
Bascome 88' (pen.)

Bermuda National Stadium, Hamilton

== Final rankings ==
Rank	Team
Gold medal	Bermuda
Silver medal	Greenland
Bronze medal	Falkland Islands
4	Frøya

== See also ==
- Football at the 2013 Island Games – Women's tournament
