= Bermuda Hogges F.C. =

Association football club in Bermuda

Bermuda Hogges
- Full name: Bermuda Hogges Football Club
- Nickname: Hogges
- Founded: 2006
- Dissolved: 2013
- Ground: BAA Stadium; Pembroke, Bermuda
- Capacity: 1,000
- Owner: Paul Scope
- Head Coach: Andrew Bascome
- League: USL Premier Development League
- 2011: 6th, Mid Atlantic; Playoffs: DNQ
- Website: http://www.uslsoccer.com/teams/2011/6188091.html#MAIN
Home colours	Away colours

Bermuda Hogges were a Bermudian football team based in Hamilton, Bermuda. Founded in 2006, the team played in the USL Premier Development League (PDL), the fourth tier of the American Soccer Pyramid, in the Mid Atlantic Division of the Eastern Conference. On 28 May 2013, the club announced it pulled out of the USL's Premier Development League due to financial difficulties.

The team played its home games at the Bermuda Athletic Association Stadium in Pembroke, Bermuda. The team's colours were red, green and white.

== History ==
The Hogges were announced as an expansion team in the USL Second Division in 2007, owned by Bermuda legend Shaun Goater, fellow former professional Kyle Lightbourne, and local businessman Paul Scope. The stated aim of the team was to develop the overall level of play in Bermuda due to increased regular international competition for the top Bermudan players, which it was hoped would also result in a more competitive national team. The name "Hogges" was suggested by the team's owners following a fan contest; it comes from the hog's long association with Bermuda, and the toughness of the animal.

The initial first team squad included a number of full Bermudian international players, notably Stephen Astwood, Domico Coddington, Darius Cox, Devaun DeGraff, Timothy Figureido, Damon Ming, John Barry Nusum, Michael Parsons, Jelani Scott and Kwame Steede, all of whom had represented their country in various World Cup and CONCACAF Gold Cup qualifying games. Shaun Goater and Kyle Lightbourne were also Bermudian internationals until their retirement from international football, making the Hogges' by far the most experienced USL2 team in terms of international competition.

The team's first game took place on 27 April 2007, at home against the Harrisburg City Islanders, in front of over 1,500 fans. The Islanders won the game 1–0 off a goal from Chad Severs, setting in motion a difficult first season for the Hogges. Bermuda won just three of their 20 regular season games – a 2–1 over New Hampshire Phantoms at the end of June in what was the franchise's first ever victory, a 3–2 over Cincinnati Kings in July in which Stephen Astwood hit two goals, and a 1–0 victory in August, again over New Hampshire. Lloyd Holder scored the Hogges' first ever goals in the 1–1 draw with Cincinnati in May; elsewhere, however, the Hogges struggled to find form. Charlotte Eagles hit four goals past them in two separate occasions, Richmond Kickers hammered them 4–0 in mid-June, while the season's nadir came in the astonishing 8–1 demolition they suffered at the hands of Crystal Palace Baltimore in late July. The season ended with the Hogges in last place in the USL2 table, one point behind the New Hampshire Phantoms, but 29 points behind regular season champions Richmond. Stephen Astwood had the honour being the Hogges' top scorer in the debut season, with four goals, while Damon Ming contributed four assists. Shaun Goater made 8 appearances for his team, scoring three goals along the way.

The Hogges' form improved slightly in the 2008 season, and although they finished the year with a losing record, and out of the playoffs for a second year, they did improve to a 5–13–2 record, and finished ahead of Real Maryland Monarchs in the final standings. The year began with a disappointing 6–0 loss to Charlotte Eagles on the opening day of the season, but the Hogges quickly recovered to register back-to-back victories for the first time in franchise history with wins over Wilmington Hammerheads and Pittsburgh Riverhounds. Further wins over Western Mass Pioneers (3–1 in mid-June), Real Maryland Monarchs (2–1 on the road in late July off a late goal from Kevin Richards), and Crystal Palace Baltimore (3–1 on the penultimate game of the season) provided the year's bright spots; however, they also suffered a number of comprehensive losses, falling 5–1 to Wilmington in early July, 5–1 to eventual USL2 champions Cleveland City Stars later in the month, and being annihilated 7–1 at home by the Richmond Kickers, with Richmond striker David Bulow scoring a hat trick. Damon Ming was Bermuda's sophomore season top performer, with four goals and four assists. Shaun Goater made just four appearances, registering just 18 minutes of play for the year.

On 22 December 2009, following the exodus of teams from the USL to the new North American Soccer League, the Hogges announced that they would self-relegate, and play in the USL Premier Development League in 2010.

On 28 May 2013 club management announced they would not field a team in the PDL for the 2013 season. The team's owner Paul Scope said Hogges had failed to raise sufficient funds to cover the cost.

== Players ==
=== Notable former players ===
This list of notable former players comprises players who went on to play professional football after playing for the team in the Premier Development League, or those who previously played professionally before joining the team.

- (Bermuda) Logan Alexander
- (Bermuda) Stephen Astwood
- (Bermuda) Tyrell Burgess
- (Bermuda) Devaun DeGraff
- (Bermuda) Shaun Goater
- (Bermuda) Freddy Hall
- (Bermuda) Kyle Lightbourne
- (Bermuda) John Barry Nusum
- (Bermuda) Kevin Richards
- (Trinidad and Tobago) Marlon Rojas
- (Bermuda) Antwan Russell
- (Bermuda) Nahki Wells
- (Bermuda) Damon Ming

== Year-by-year ==
Year	Division	League	Reg. season	Playoffs
2007	3	USL Second Division	10th	Did not qualify
2008	3	USL Second Division	9th	Did not qualify
2009	3	USL Second Division	9th	Did not qualify
2010	4	USL PDL	10th, Mid Atlantic	Did not qualify
2011	4	USL PDL	6th, Mid Atlantic	Did not qualify
2012	4	USL PDL	9th, Mid Atlantic	Did not qualify

== Head coaches ==
- (Bermuda) Kyle Lightbourne (2007–2009)
- (Bermuda) Scott Morton (2010)
- (Bermuda) Maurice Lowe (2011–2012)

== Stadia ==
- Bermuda National Stadium, Hamilton, Bermuda (2007–2009)
- Bermuda Athletic Association Stadium, Pembroke, Bermuda (2010–2012)

== Average attendance ==
Attendance stats are calculated by averaging each team's self-reported home attendances from the historical match archive at https://web.archive.org/web/20100105175057/http://www.uslsoccer.com/history/index_E.html.

- 2007: 756
- 2008: 532
- 2009: 744
- 2010: 254
