= Bermuda National Stadium =

Multi-purpose stadium in Bermuda

Coordinates: 32°18′2″N 64°46′11″W

Bermuda National Sports Centre
- Interactive map of Bermuda National Sports Centre

Ground information
- Location: Hamilton, Bermuda
- Country: Bermuda
- Capacity: 8,500
- First men's T20I: 19 August 2019: Bermuda v Canada
- Last men's T20I: 7 October 2023: Bermuda v Canada

Team information
Bermuda national football team	(1956–)
Bermuda national cricket team	(1955–)
- As of 7 October 2023; Source: Cricinfo

The Bermuda National Stadium (also known as the Bermuda National Sports Centre) is a multi-purpose sports complex in Devonshire Parish, just to the east of the capital, Hamilton. The stadium was built on what was once a field used as a parade and sporting ground within Prospect Camp. The track had experienced Usain Bolt's performance in the 2004 CARIFTA Games, where he broke the World Junior 200m Record with a time of 19.93 seconds.

== Football ==
The main stadium is currently used mostly for football matches. The stadium holds 8,500. The stadium was used by the Bermuda Hogges of the United Soccer Leagues Second Division.

== Cricket ==
Located just north of the National Stadium is a cricket ground of the same name which is used by the Bermuda cricket team. The first recorded cricket match on the ground came in 1955 when E. W. Swanton's XI played Bermuda. It held its first first-class match when the New Zealanders played Bermuda as part of their tour of the West Indies. The match, which marked Bermuda's debut in first-class cricket, ended in a victory for the New Zealanders by an innings and 31 runs. Thirty-two years later the ground held its next first-class match, involving Bermuda and the United States in the 2004 Intercontinental Cup. Four further first-class matches have been held on the ground, the last of which saw Bermuda play the United Arab Emirates in the 2009-10 ICC Intercontinental Shield.

The ground hosted its first List A match in 2009, when Bermuda played Uganda in a three match series. Two further List A matches were played in a two match series against the United Arab Emirates in 2010. The series against the United Arab Emirates also saw two Twenty20 matches played there. With Bermuda's relegation from 2011 World Cricket League Division Two, the return of senior cricket to the ground is for the foreseeable future some way off. The pitch at the ground often cited controversy due to its poor quality, meaning when Bermuda had One Day International status they were the only Associate with that status which did not have an ODI accredited ground.

In August 2019, the venue was selected as one of the two grounds to host matches in the Regional Finals of the 2018–19 ICC T20 World Cup Americas Qualifier tournament. However, mid-way through the tournament, the pitch was deemed to be unsuitable, and the matches scheduled to be played at the stadium were moved to White Hill Field.

The Bermuda National Stadium hosted matches in the Americas Qualifier regional finals of the 2024 ICC Men's T20 World Cup

Bermuda 1973 4 Cent Stamp depicting the National Tennis Stadium in Pembroke.
