= Bermuda national football team =

Men's association football team

Bermuda
- Nickname: Gombey Warriors
- Association: Bermuda Football Association (BFA)
- Confederation: CONCACAF (North America)
- Sub-confederation: CFU (Caribbean)
- Head coach: John Barry Nusum
- Captain: Zeiko Lewis
- Most caps: Reggie Lambe (63)
- Top scorer: Shaun Goater; Nahki Wells (20)
- Home stadium: Bermuda National Stadium
- FIFA code: BER
First colours	Second colours

FIFA ranking
- Current: 171 ▼4 (7 October 2026)
- Highest: 58 (December 1992)
- Lowest: 189 (September 2011)

First international
- Iceland 4–3 Bermuda (Reykjavík, Iceland; 10 August 1964)

Biggest win
- Bermuda 13–0 Montserrat (Hamilton, Bermuda; 29 February 2004)

Biggest defeat
- Bermuda 0–7 Curaçao (Devonshire Parish, Bermuda; 13 November 2025)

CONCACAF Gold Cup
- Appearances: 1 (first in 2019)
- Best result: Group stage (2019)

CONCACAF Nations League
- Appearances: 5 (first in 2019–20)
- Best result: 10th place (2019–20)

The Bermuda national football team represents Bermuda, a British overseas territory in men's international football, and is governed by the Bermuda Football Association, the governing body for football in Bermuda founded in 1928. It has been a full member of FIFA and CONCACAF since 1962, and is also a member of CFU in the Caribbean Zone.

Bermuda has never qualified for the FIFA World Cup, but has qualified for the CONCACAF Gold Cup once in 2019. Bermuda has also participated once in League A and four times in League B of the CONCACAF Nations League.

Bermuda's debut in international competitions was in the 1967 Pan American Games, winning the silver medal, and its first appearance in World Cup qualifiers was for 1970 qualification. The team's first victory was in 1967 by defeating Trinidad and Tobago 3–1.

In subcontinental competitions, the team won two consecutive bronze medals at the Central American and Caribbean Games (1974 and 1978).

== History ==
=== 1964–1992 ===
Bermuda played their first international match on 10 August 1964, against Iceland in Reykjavík, ending in a narrow victory to the Icelanders, 4–3. A few years later, Bermuda participated in the 1967 Pan American Games in Winnipeg. Coached by Graham Adams, they reached the final but fell to Mexico, 4–0 a.e.t.

In 1968 they participated in the qualifiers for the 1970 FIFA World Cup for the first time. In Group 1 of the first round, they were paired with United States and Canada. They finished the group with one draw (against Canada, 0–0) and three losses and were eliminated. The sixties would end with an elimination at the hands of Mexico, in the 1969 CONCACAF Championship qualification preliminary round, although Bermuda, after having lost 3–0 in Mexico City, managed to defeat the Aztecs 2–1 in Hamilton, on 2 November 1969, with goals from Albert Dowling and Bernard Brangman.

The '70s would begin with another elimination in the first round of the 1971 CONCACAF Championship qualification, again at the hands of Mexico, which prevailed comfortably with an overall result of 6–0. In this decade the Bermuda team managed to win two consecutive bronze medals in the Central American and Caribbean Games of 1974 and 1978. The decade of the '80s was not very significant for the Gombey Warriors since they only participated in the 1982 Central American and Caribbean Games, a tournament where reached 4th place. This would be their final participation in the Games.

On the other hand, between 1967 and 1987, the Bermuda team played several qualifying matches for the Olympic soccer tournament but never qualified for the final tournament. In this period they experienced some of their worst defeats, such as two 8–0 results against Canada and Mexico.

=== 1992–2019 ===
Absent from the World Cup qualifiers between 1972 and 1992, Bermuda returned to the 1994 preliminary tournament where they eliminated Haiti in the first round thanks to the away goals rule, after winning 1–0 in Hamilton (goal by Shaun Goater) and lost 2–1 in Port-au-Prince. Bermuda advanced to the second phase, in group B with Jamaica, Canada and El Salvador, finishing in last place with 4 points, despite managing a historic 1–0 victory against the Selecta, the result of a goal from Kyle Lightbourne. In the 1998 World Cup qualifiers, Bermuda withdrew without playing Trinidad and Tobago in the first round.

The Gombey Warriors would return four years later for the 2002 World Cup qualifiers where they eliminated the British Virgin Islands in the first round, 5–1 and 9–0, before falling in the next phase, at the hands of Antigua and Barbuda, who won thanks to the away goal rule after drawing 0–0 at Saint John's and 1–1 in Hamilton. In the tournament preliminary route to the 2006 FIFA World Cup, Bermuda got their biggest win, thrashing Montserrat 13–0. Later it was eliminated by El Salvador who prevailed 2–1 in San Salvador and later drew 2–2 in Hamilton. In the qualifying process for the 2010 FIFA World Cup, Bermuda eliminated the Cayman Islands in the first round with an aggregate score of 4–1. But it was brought down in the next round by Trinidad and Tobago with an aggregate score of 3–2 although Bermuda achieved an away victory, in Macoya, against the Soca Warriors (1–2), with a double from John Nusum. In the 2014 World Cup qualifiers, Bermuda entered the second round directly in group B, alongside Guyana, Trinidad and Tobago and Barbados. Although they again defeated Trinidad and Tobago (2–1), they could only finish third in the group with 10 points, failing to advance to the third round.

On the other hand, since 1997, Bermuda began to play regularly in the knockout phase of the Caribbean Cup (except in 2001 and 2010) although it never managed to qualify for the final round. Their best performance occurred in the 2007 tournament where they advanced to the second knockout round. They missed the chance to reach the final tournament, losing to Haiti in two sets (0–2 and 0–3).

In July 2013, Bermuda won its 15th gold medal at the 2013 Island Games in Hamilton after beating Greenland 1–0. This competition is not officially recognised because teams not recognized by FIFA participate.

Luke Robinson made his international debut for Bermuda in 2021

In 2015 Bermuda participated in the 2018 World Cup Qualifiers where they would face the Bahamas, whom they defeated over the two matches by 5–0. Going into the second round, they faced Guatemala, drawing 0–0 then falling 1–0, failing to reach the third round. Bermuda would return to the Caribbean Cup after being absent in 2014, losing initially against Cuba 2–1 but defeating French Guiana 2–1 to edge through to the second round on goal-difference. They then lost to both Dominican Republic (2–1) and French Guiana (3–0) and were eliminated from the cup.

=== 2019–present ===
==== Debut in CONCACAF Gold Cup ====
In 2019, Bermuda made its CONCACAF Nations League debut, where it made history by finishing in the top ten of the competition, allowing it to jointly qualify for League A of the competition and its first CONCACAF Gold Cup. In League A, Bermuda were drawn with Mexico and Panama but finished at the bottom of the group on goal-difference.

At the 2019 CONCACAF Gold Cup, Bermuda is drawn in Group B with Haiti, Costa Rica and Nicaragua. After two defeats to the first two teams, Bermuda won their first victory of the continental tournament by beating Nicaragua 2–0.

Even if Bermuda fails to qualify for the 2021 CONCACAF Gold Cup, Nahki Wells made history by scoring the fastest Gold Cup goal (all phases combined) after 17 seconds in the match against Barbados on 2 July 2021 (an 8–1 victory in the end).

==== FIFA Series tournament ====
In 2024, FIFA Invited Bermuda to the 2024 FIFA Series matches from 22 to 26 March 2024 held in Jeddah. On 22 March 2024, Bermuda faced off against Brunei from the AFC, where they defeated them 2–0.

==== 2026 FIFA World Cup qualifiers ====
In 2024-2025, Bermuda participated in the 2026 World Cup Qualifiers, entering the qualifiers at the second round. In their first two games in June 2024, they drew 1–1 with Antigua and Barbuda but lost 6–1 to Honduras. Then in their second two games in June 2025, they would defeat the Cayman Islands 5–0 and then defeat Cuba 2–1 to finish second in their group and advance to the third round, to be played between September and November 2025. Drawn in Group B with Jamaica, Curaçao and Trinidad and Tobago, the Gombey Warriors suffered four defeats in their first four matches and found themselves eliminated from qualifying for the 2026 FIFA World Cup.

== National football stadium ==
Stadium	Capacity	City
Bermuda National Stadium	8,500	Devonshire Parish

== Results and fixtures ==
The following is a list of match results in the last 12 months, as well as any future matches that have been scheduled.

Win Draw Loss Fixture

=== 2025 ===
13 November 2026 FIFA World Cup qualification	Bermuda	0–7	Curaçao	Devonshire Parish, Bermuda
20:00 UTC−3		Report	6' (pen.) L. Bacuna; 32' J. Bacuna; 48' (pen.), 63' Paulina; 59' Hansen; 82' Martha; 90+2' van Eijma	Stadium: Bermuda National Stadium; Attendance: 1,181; Referee: Tori Penso (United States)

18 November 2026 FIFA World Cup qualification	Trinidad and Tobago	2–2	Bermuda	Port of Spain, Trinidad and Tobago
21:00 UTC−4	Henry 9'; James 66'	Report	60' Tucker; 65' Parfitt	Stadium: Hasely Crawford Stadium; Referee: Jose Raúl Torres Rivera (Puerto Rico)

=== 2026 ===
25 March Friendly	DR Congo	2–0	Bermuda	Guadalajara, Mexico
15:00 UTC−6	Mayele 45'; Wissa 51' (pen.)	Report		Stadium: Estadio Akron

6 June Friendly	Cape Verde	3–0	Bermuda	East Hartford, Connecticut, United States
16:00 UTC−4	Semedo 33'; Rodrigues 49'; da Costa 90+1'	Report		Stadium: Pratt & Whitney Stadium at Rentschler Field

25 September 2026–27 CONCACAF Nations League	Bermuda	1–2	Guadeloupe	Gros Islet, Saint Lucia
15:00 UTC−4	Russell 18' (pen.)	Report	Vulgaire 84' Boisne 89'	Stadium: Daren Sammy Cricket Ground

28 September 2026–27 CONCACAF Nations League	Saint Lucia	5–2	Bermuda	Gros Islet, Saint Lucia
20:00 UTC−4	Caull 15', 18', 35' Byron 53' Fredrick 68'	Report	Burchall 45+1' Robinson 70'	Stadium: Daren Sammy Cricket Ground

2 October 2026–27 CONCACAF Nations League	Barbados	4–1	Bermuda	Wildey, Barbados
20:00 UTC−4	Gale 26', 41'; Applewhaite 29'; Reid-Stephen 86'	Report	Parfitt-Williams 8'	Stadium: Wildey Turf; Attendance: 1,100; Referee: Eric de la Cruz (Cuba)

5 October 2026–27 CONCACAF Nations League	Bermuda	1–2	Barbados	Wildey, Barbados
20:00 UTC−4	Parfitt-Williams 75'	Report	Gale 79', 82'	Stadium: Wildey Turf; Attendance: 591; Referee: Sergio Rozenhaut (Suriname)

13 November 2026–27 CONCACAF Nations League	Bermuda	v	Saint Lucia	Le Gosier, Guadeloupe
				Stadium: Stade Roger Zami

16 November 2026–27 CONCACAF Nations League	Guadeloupe	v	Bermuda	Le Gosier, Guadeloupe
				Stadium: Stade Roger Zami

== Coaching staff ==
As of October 2025.

Position	Name
Manager	(Bermuda) John Barry Nusum
Assistant manager	(England) Jake Littlejohn
Assistant manager	(Bermuda) John Barry Nusum
Goalkeeper coach	(Canada) John Moreira

=== Coaching history ===
- (England) Graham Adams (1965–1968)
- (West Germany) Rudi Gutendorf (1968)
- (West Germany) Bernd Fischer (1969–??)
- (Bermuda) Carton Dill (1978-??)
- (Bermuda) Roderick "Roddy" Burchall (1987–??)
- (Bermuda) Gary Darrell (19??–1992)
- (Germany) Burkhard Ziese (1994–1997)
- (Bermuda) Clyde Best (1997–1999)
- (Bermuda) Robert Calderon (1999–2000)
- (Bermuda) Mark Trott (2001)
- (Bermuda) Kenny Thompson (2004–??)
- (Bermuda) Kyle Lightbourne (2007)
- (Bermuda) Keith Tucker (2008)
- (Bermuda) Devarr Boyles (2011–2012)
- (Bermuda) Andrew Bascome (2012–2016)
- (Bermuda) Dennis Brown (2013–2016)
- (Bermuda) Kyle Lightbourne (2017)
- (Bermuda) Devarr Boyles (2017)
- (Bermuda) Andrew Bascome (2017–2018)
- (Bermuda) Dennis Brown (2017–2018)
- (Bermuda) Kyle Lightbourne (2018–2023)
- (Canada) Michael Findlay (2023–2026)
- (Bermuda) Maurice Lowe (caretaker) (2026)
- (Bermuda) John Barry Nusum (2026–present)

== Players ==
=== Current squad ===
The following players were called up for the 2026–27 CONCACAF Nations League B matches against Guadeloupe, Saint Lucia and Barbados (twice) on 25, 28 September, 2 and 5 October 2026; respectively.

Caps and goals correct as of 5 October 2026, after the match against Barbados.

No.	Pos.	Player	Date of birth (age)	Caps	Goals	Club
1	GK	Milai Perott	12 April 2004 (age 22)	4	0	Free agent
12	GK	Jahquil Hill	15 January 1997 (age 29)	8	0	(Bermuda Football Association) St. George's Colts
23	GK	Coleridge Fubler	30 October 2003 (age 23)	0	0	(The Football Association) Binfield
2	DF	Emeer Peets	5 May 2008 (age 18)	1	0	(The Football Association) Boston United
11	DF	Deniche Hill	11 March 2004 (age 22)	15	0	Free agent
14	DF	Brighton Morrison	28 November 2005 (age 20)	2	0	(The Football Association) Sandhurst Town
17	DF	Harry Twite	17 June 2005 (age 21)	29	0	(The Football Association) Basford United
21	DF	Caleb McDowall	26 May 2003 (age 23)	1	0	(United States Soccer Federation) Anderson Trojans
3	MF	Diego Richardson	31 July 2001 (age 25)	4	0	(Bermuda Football Association) Hamilton Parish
4	MF	London Steede-Jackson	30 December 1994 (age 31)	7	0	(Bermuda Football Association) BAA Wanderers
5	MF	Ne-Jai Tucker	20 August 2002 (age 24)	27	2	(The Football Association) Walton & Hersham
10	MF	Zeiko Lewis	4 June 1994 (age 32)	56	11	Free agent
16	MF	Jorj Dublin	10 August 1999 (age 27)	3	0	(Bermuda Football Association) Devonshire Colts
20	MF	Riley Robinson	9 February 2005 (age 21)	4	1	(Gibraltar Football Association) Glacis United
6	FW	Sincere Hall	12 June 2004 (age 22)	6	0	Free agent
7	FW	Lejaun Simmons	7 April 1993 (age 33)	47	5	(Bermuda Football Association) Devonshire Cougars
8	FW	Djair Parfitt	1 October 1996 (age 30)	26	10	Free agent
9	FW	Enrique Russell	5 February 2000 (age 26)	16	1	(Bermuda Football Association) PHC Zebras
13	FW	Blayz Borgesson	15 September 2008 (age 18)	4	0	(The Football Association) Burnley
15	FW	Elisha Darrell	26 November 1999 (age 26)	2	0	(Bermuda Football Association) Devonshire Colts
18	FW	Luke Robinson	20 October 1998 (age 28)	23	0	(The Football Association) Whitehawk
19	FW	Ajani Burchall	5 November 2004 (age 22)	4	1	(United States Soccer Federation) NC State Wolfpack
22	FW	Justin Donawa	27 June 1996 (age 30)	33	3	Free agent
	FW	Nahki Wells	1 June 1990 (age 36)	32	20	(The Football Association) Luton Town

=== Recent call-ups ===
The following players have also been called up to the Bermuda squad within the last twelve months.

Pos.	Player	Date of birth (age)	Caps	Goals	Club	Latest call-up
GK	Nathaniel Swan	5 May 2006 (age 20)	0	0	Unknown	v. DR Congo, 25 March 2026
DF	Roger Lee	1 July 1991 (age 35)	46	0	(England) Heanor Town	v. DR Congo, 25 March 2026
DF	Julian Carpenter	6 December 1995 (age 30)	8	1	(Bermuda) Paget Lions	v. DR Congo, 25 March 2026
DF	Daniel Cook	10 June 2003 (age 23)	8	0	(Bermuda) Dandy Town	v. DR Congo, 25 March 2026
DF	Kieron Richardson	28 January 2005 (age 21)	2	0	(United States) UCCS Mountain Lions	v. DR Congo, 25 March 2026
DF	David Jones	12 March 1997 (age 29)	2	0	(Bermuda) Dandy Town Hornets	v. DR Congo, 25 March 2026
MF	Aundè Todd	16 May 2005 (age 21)	18	1	(England) Sandhurst Town	v. DR Congo, 25 March 2026
MF	Amir Dill	31 May 2002 (age 24)	1	0	(Bermuda) North Village Rams	v. DR Congo, 25 March 2026
MF	Joshua Joseph	12 November 2003 (age 23)	1	0	(England) Cheadle Heath Nomads	v. DR Congo, 25 March 2026
MF	Senoj Mitchell	7 February 2001 (age 25)	1	0	(Bermuda) Devonshire Colts	v. DR Congo, 25 March 2026
MF	La Zai Outerbridge	5 January 2004 (age 22)	1	0	(United States) Hobart Statesmen	v. DR Congo, 25 March 2026
FW	Logan Jiménez	15 May 2008 (age 18)	2	0	(Scotland) Hibernian	v. DR Congo, 25 March 2026
Notes: ^{INJ} = Withdrew due to injury; ^{RET} = Retired from the national team; ^{WD} = Player withdrew from the squad due to non-injury issue.

== Player records ==
As of 15 October 2025
Statistics include official FIFA-recognised matches only.
Players in bold are still active with Bermuda.

=== Most appearances ===
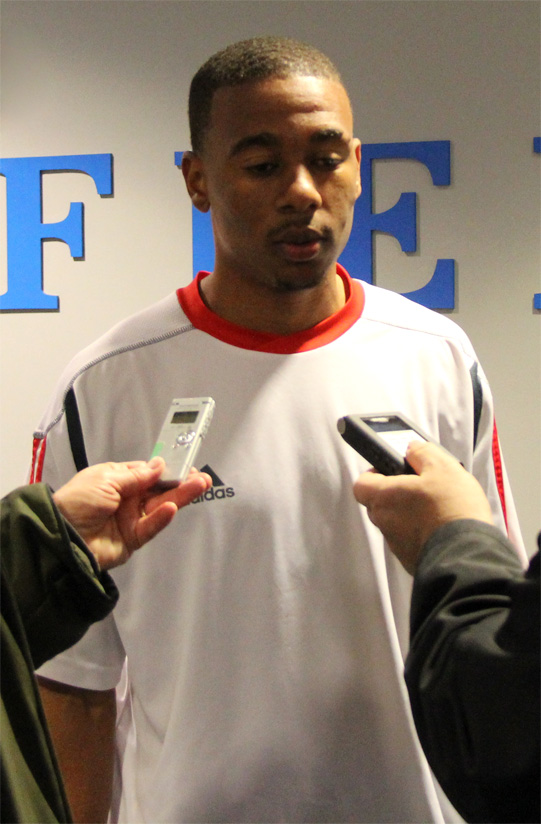
Reggie Lambe is Bermuda's most capped player with 63 appearances.

Rank	Player	Caps	Goals	Career
1	**Reggie Lambe**	59	6	2007–present
2	**Dante Leverock**	48	7	2015–present
2	**Dale Eve**	48	0	2011–present
4	**Zeiko Lewis** (Note: Zeiko Lewis also appeared in 3 matches, scoring three goals, in the 2013 Island Games against sides that are not FIFA members - nor are they associate members of one of FIFA's affiliated confederations - therefore they are not counted here.)	47	8	2011–present
5	**Roger Lee** (Note: Roger Lee also appeared in 3 matches in the 2013 Island Games against sides that are not FIFA members - nor are they associate members of one of FIFA's affiliated confederations - therefore they are not counted here.)	46	0	2008–present
6	**Lejaun Simmons** (Note: Lejaun Simmons also appeared in 1 match, scoring three goals, in the 2013 Island Games against a side that was not a FIFA member - nor are they an associate member of one of FIFA's affiliated confederations - therefore the match is not counted here.)	40	3	2012–present
7	Damon Ming (Note: Damon Ming also appeared in 3 matches, scoring one goal, in the 2013 Island Games against sides that are not FIFA members - nor are they associate members of one of FIFA's affiliated confederations - therefore they are not counted here.)	37	6	2003–2016
8	John Barry Nusum (Note: John Barry Nusum also appeared in 3 matches in the 2013 Island Games against sides that are not FIFA members - nor are they associate members of one of FIFA's affiliated confederations - therefore they are not counted here.)	36	19	2000–2012
9	**Willie Clemons**	33	2	2016–present
10	Khano Smith	32	10	2003–2012
10	Meshach Wade	32	3	1990–2008

=== Top goalscorers ===
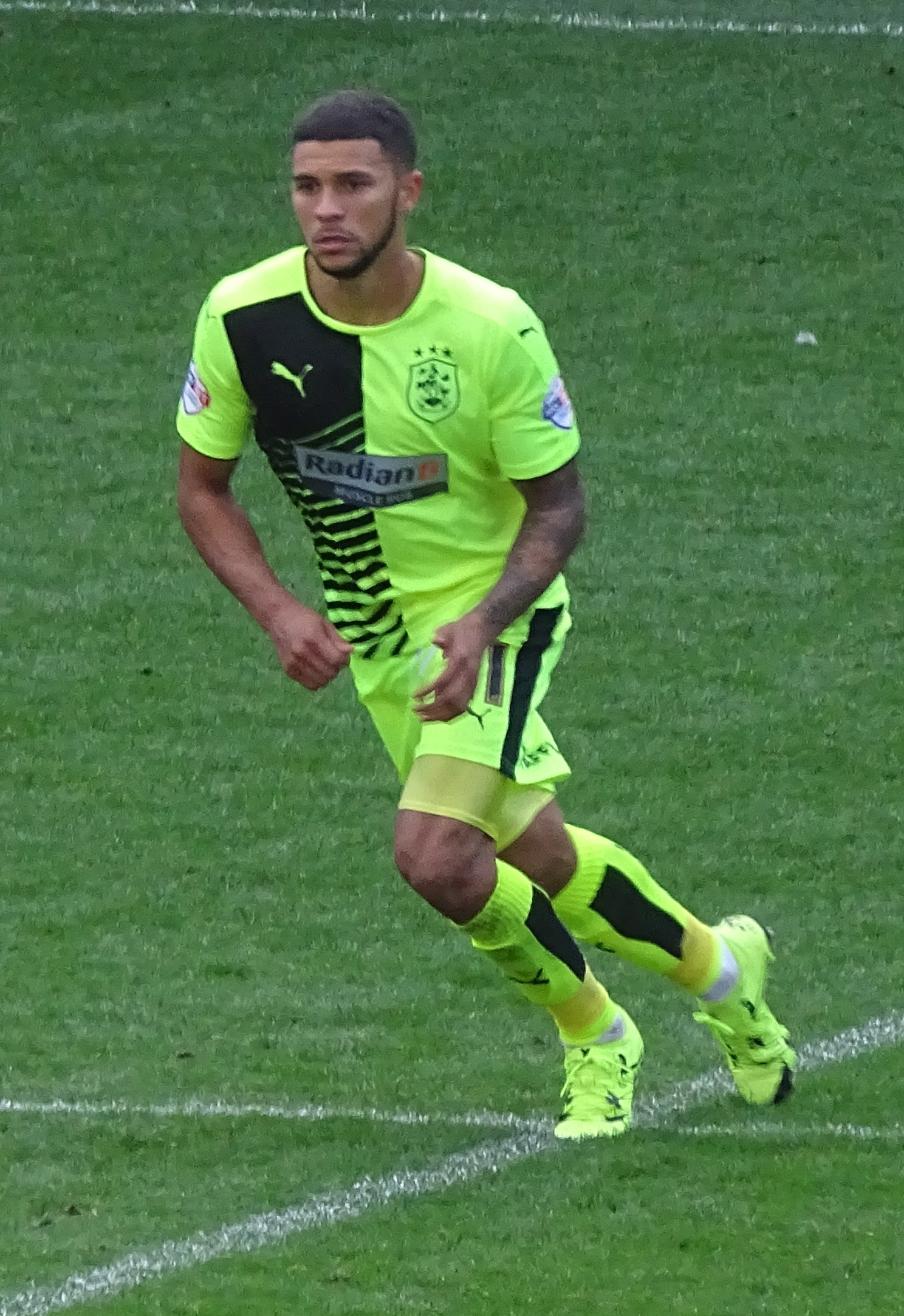
Nahki Wells is Bermuda's all-time top scorer with 20 goals.

Rank	Player	Goals	Caps	Ratio	Career
1	**Nahki Wells** (Note: Nahki Wells also appeared in 1 match in the 2007 Island Games against a side that was not a FIFA member - nor were they an associate member of one of FIFA's affiliated confederations - therefore the match is not counted here.)	20	30	0.67	2007–present
2	Shaun Goater	19	20	0.95	1988–2004
2	John Barry Nusum	19	36	0.53	2000–2012
4	**Kane Crichlow**	12	24	0.5	2021–present
5	Khano Smith	10	32	0.31	2003–2012
6	Kyle Lightbourne	8	18	0.44	1989–2004
6	**Djair Parfitt-Williams**	8	22	0.36	2022–present
6	**Zeiko Lewis**	8	47	0.17	2011–present
9	**Dante Leverock**	7	48	0.13	2015–present
10	Kwame Steede	6	21	0.29	2003–2011
10	Damon Ming	6	37	0.16	2004–2016
10	**Reggie Lambe**	6	59	0.1	2007–present

== Head-to-head record ==
Updated to 5 October 2026 after the match against Barbados
Sources consulted: RSSSF (before 2013) and National Football Teams (after 2013).

Positive Record Neutral Record Negative Record

Opponents	Pld	W	D	L	GF	GA
Antigua and Barbuda	12	5	4	3	16	13
Aruba	2	1	0	1	6	3
Bahamas	6	5	1	0	21	0
Barbados	18	7	4	7	31	26
Belize	2	1	1	0	2	1
British Virgin Islands	3	2	0	1	14	3
Brunei	1	1	0	0	2	0
Canada	10	0	4	6	5	22
Cape Verde	1	0	0	1	0	3
Cayman Islands	10	6	3	1	20	8
Costa Rica	1	0	0	1	1	2
Cuba	6	1	1	4	7	14
Curaçao	2	0	0	2	2	10
Denmark	2	0	0	2	1	11
Dominica	2	2	0	0	9	3
Dominican Republic	5	2	0	3	9	12
DR Congo	1	0	0	1	0	2
El Salvador	5	2	1	2	6	8
Finland	1	0	0	1	0	2
French Guiana	4	1	1	2	2	7
Grenada	4	2	2	0	8	5
Guadeloupe	1	0	0	1	1	2
Guatemala	3	0	2	1	0	1
Guinea	1	0	0	1	1	5
Guyana	5	1	1	3	4	7
Haiti	10	1	2	7	7	20
Honduras	3	0	0	3	4	15
Iceland	4	1	0	3	7	12
Jamaica	12	0	5	7	7	24
Mexico	6	1	0	5	4	17
Montserrat	4	3	0	1	25	3
Nicaragua	5	3	0	2	7	5
Norway	2	0	0	2	1	6
Panama	3	1	0	2	4	8
Puerto Rico	4	0	1	3	2	6
Saint Kitts and Nevis	3	1	0	2	5	7
Saint Lucia	2	1	0	1	4	5
Saint Martin	3	3	0	0	17	1
Saint Vincent and the Grenadines	4	1	1	2	8	12
Sint Maarten	1	1	0	0	12	0
Suriname	5	1	0	4	6	20
Trinidad and Tobago	17	3	6	8	18	34
United States	8	2	0	6	9	15
U.S. Virgin Islands	1	1	0	0	6	0

== Competitive record ==
=== FIFA World Cup ===
FIFA World Cup record										Qualification record					
Year	Round	Pos.	Pld	W	D	L	GF	GA	Squad	Pld	W	D	L	GF	GA
1930 to 1962	Not a FIFA member									Not a FIFA member					
(England) 1966	Did not participate									Did not participate					
(Mexico) 1970	Did not qualify									4	0	1	3	2	12
1974 to 1990	Did not participate									Did not participate					
(United States) 1994	Did not qualify									10	4	2	4	14	15
(France) 1998	Withdrew									Withdrew					
(South Korea) (Japan) 2002	Did not qualify									4	2	2	0	15	2
(Germany) 2006	Did not qualify									4	2	1	1	23	4
(South Africa) 2010	Did not qualify									4	2	1	1	6	5
(Brazil) 2014	Did not qualify									6	3	1	2	8	7
(Russia) 2018	Did not qualify									4	2	1	1	8	1
(Qatar) 2022	Did not qualify									4	1	1	2	7	12
(Canada) (Mexico) (United States) 2026	Did not qualify									10	2	2	6	13	31
(Morocco) (Portugal) (Spain) 2030	To be determined									To be determined					
(Saudi Arabia) 2034	To be determined									To be determined					
Total	—	0/9	—							50	18	12	20	96	89

=== CONCACAF Gold Cup ===
CONCACAF Championship / Gold Cup record										Qualification record					
Year	Round	Pos.	Pld	W	D	L	GF	GA	Squad	Pld	W	D	L	GF	GA
1963 to 1967	Not a CONCACAF member									Not a CONCACAF member					
(Costa Rica) 1969	Did not qualify									2	1	0	1	2	4
(Trinidad and Tobago) 1971	Did not qualify									2	0	0	2	0	6
1973 to 1996	Did not participate									Did not participate					
(United States) 1998	Did not qualify									2	0	0	2	1	4
(United States) 2000	Did not qualify									3	2	0	1	11	3
(United States) 2002	Withdrew									Withdrew					
(Mexico) (United States) 2003	Did not participate									Did not participate					
(United States) 2005	Did not qualify									3	1	1	1	5	6
(United States) 2007	Did not qualify									8	4	1	3	17	10
(United States) 2009	Did not qualify									3	1	1	1	7	4
(United States) 2011	Did not participate									Did not participate					
(United States) 2013	Did not qualify									3	1	0	2	10	5
(United States) (Canada) 2015	Did not participate									Did not participate					
(United States) 2017	Did not qualify									4	1	0	3	3	7
(United States) (Costa Rica) (Jamaica) 2019	Group stage	11th	3	1	0	2	4	4	Squad	4	3	0	1	17	4
(United States) 2021	Did not qualify									6	2	0	4	14	16
(United States) (Canada) 2023	Did not qualify									6	1	1	4	7	10
(United States) (Canada) 2025	Did not qualify									8	4	0	4	18	20
Total	Group stage	1/13	3	1	0	2	4	4	—	54	21	4	29	112	99

CONCACAF Championship / Gold Cup history
First match	Haiti 2–1 Bermuda (16 June 2019; San José, Costa Rica)
Biggest win	Bermuda 2–0 Nicaragua (24 June 2019; Harrison, United States)
Biggest defeat	Haiti 2–1 Bermuda (16 June 2019; San José, Costa Rica); Costa Rica 2–1 Bermuda (20 June 2019; Frisco, United States)
Best result	Group stage (2019)
Worst result	Group stage (2019)

=== CONCACAF Nations League ===
CONCACAF Nations League record
League phase											Final phase									
Season	Div.	Group	Pos.	Pld	W	D	L	GF	GA	P/R	Finals	Round	Pos.	Pld	W	D	L	GF	GA	Squad
2019–20	A	B	10th	4	1	0	3	5	11	▼	(United States) 2021	Did not qualify								
2022–23	B	B	10th	6	1	1	4	7	10	Same position	(United States) 2023	Ineligible								
2023–24	B	C	10th	6	2	2	2	8	9	Same position	(United States) 2024	Ineligible								
2024–25	B	D	6th	6	4	0	2	15	13	Same position	(United States) 2025	Ineligible								
2026–27	B	To be determined									2027	Ineligible								
Total				22	8	3	11	35	43	—	Total	—								

CONCACAF Nations League history
First match	Bermuda 1–4 Panama (5 September 2019; Hamilton, Bermuda)
Biggest Win	Bermuda 6–1 Dominica (12 October 2024; Devonshire Parish, Bermuda)
Biggest Defeat	Dominican Republic 6–1 Bermuda (19 November 2024; Santiago de los Caballeros, Dominican Republic)
Best Result	6th – League B (2024–25)
Worst Result	Relegation League B (2019–20)

=== Caribbean Cup ===
CFU Championship / Caribbean Cup record									Qualification record					
Year	Round	Pos.	Pld	W	D	L	GF	GA	Pld	W	D	L	GF	GA
1978 to 1989	Did not participate								Did not participate					
(Trinidad and Tobago) 1990	Did not qualify								3	1	2	0	5	3
1991 to 1996	Did not participate								Did not participate					
(Antigua and Barbuda) (Saint Kitts and Nevis) 1997	Did not qualify								2	0	0	2	2	4
(Jamaica) (Trinidad and Tobago) 1998	Did not qualify								2	0	0	2	1	4
(Trinidad and Tobago) 1999	Did not qualify								3	2	0	1	11	3
(Trinidad and Tobago) 2001	Withdrew								Withdrew					
(Barbados) 2005	Did not qualify								3	1	1	1	5	6
(Trinidad and Tobago) 2007	Did not qualify								8	4	1	3	17	10
(Jamaica) 2008	Did not qualify								3	1	1	1	7	4
(Martinique) 2010	Did not participate								Did not participate					
(Antigua and Barbuda) 2012	Did not qualify								3	1	0	2	10	5
(Jamaica) 2014	Did not participate								Did not participate					
(Martinique) 2017	Did not qualify								4	1	0	3	3	7
Total	—	0/9	—						31	11	5	15	61	46

=== Pan American Games ===
Pan American Games record
Year	Round	Pos.	Pld	W	D	L	GF	GA
1951 to 1963	Did not participate							
(Canada) 1967	Silver medal	2nd	5	2	2	1	13	11
(Colombia) 1971	Preliminary Round	—	3	0	1	2	3	7
(Mexico) 1975	Did not participate							
(Puerto Rico) 1979	Preliminary Round	—	2	0	0	2	1	5
(Venezuela) 1983	Group stage	9th	2	0	0	2	2	4
1987 and 1991	Did not participate							
(Argentina) 1995	Group stage	11th	3	0	0	3	0	8
Since 1999	The youth teams participated							
Total	Silver medal	5/5	15	2	3	10	19	35

=== Central American and Caribbean Games ===
Central American and Caribbean Games record
Years	Round	Pos.	Pld	W	D	L	GF	GC
1930 to 1970	Did not participate							
(Dominican Republic) 1974	Bronze medal	3rd	6	4	1	1	11	5
(Colombia) 1978	Bronze medal	3rd	7	4	2	1	15	7
(Cuba) 1982	Fourth place	4th	5	2	0	3	9	8
(Dominican Republic) 1986	Did not participate							
Since 1990	The youth teams participated							
Total	Bronze medal	3/3	18	10	3	5	35	20

== Honours ==
=== Intercontinental ===
- Pan American Games
  - (silver) Silver medal (1): 1967

=== Subcontinental / Regional ===
- Central American and Caribbean Games
  - (bronze) Bronze medal (2): 1974, 1978

=== Friendly / Unofficial ===
- Island Games (1): 2013

== See also ==
- Bermuda national under-20 football team
- Bermuda national under-17 football team
- Football in Bermuda
