= Justin Donawa =

Bermudian footballer (born 1996)

Personal information
- Full name: Justin Donawa
- Date of birth: 27 June 1996 (age 30)
- Place of birth: Sandys Parish, Bermuda
- Height: 1.75 m (5 ft 9 in)
- Position: Winger

Youth career
- –2011: Somerset Trojans

College career
Years	Team	Apps	(Gls)
2015–2018	Dartmouth Big Green	50	(10)

Senior career*
Years	Team	Apps	(Gls)
2014–2018	Somerset Trojans	4	(2)
2018	Black Rock FC	0	(0)
2019–2020	Darlington	31	(6)
2020–2023	Solihull Moors	64	(7)
2023–2024	Altrincham	20	(3)
2024	→ Chorley (loan)	7	(0)
2024–2026	Brackley Town	31	(1)
2026	Hereford	13	(1)

International career^{‡}
- Bermuda U20
2015–	Bermuda	26	(3)
- * Club domestic league appearances and goals as of 13:44, 21 April 2026 (UTC) ‡ National team caps and goals as of 21:25, 26 November 2023 (UTC)

Justin Donawa (born 27 June 1996) is a Bermudian professional footballer who plays as a forward for the Bermuda national football team.

Donawa was a cricket player and triple jumper while growing up in Bermuda, winning three medals in regional competitions and competing at the 2013 World Youth Championships in Athletics. He found success, however, in football, coming to the United States to attend the Berkshire School and then Dartmouth College. Donawa won three Ivy League championships with the Big Green, appeared during school breaks with Somerset Trojans, and spent time in the collegiate offseason with Black Rock FC. He was drafted by Columbus Crew in the third round of the 2019 MLS SuperDraft, but was not signed by the club.

Donawa represented Bermuda at U20 level before breaking into the senior national team in 2015. He scored his first two goals for his country on his second cap, coming against the Bahamas in a 2018 World Cup qualifier.

== Early life ==
Born in Sandys Parish, Bermuda, Donawa grew up playing three sports: he ran track and field and played football and cricket during his youth. Donawa took part in the Bermuda Football Association's prep school tour in 2010, earning himself a spot at the Berkshire School in Sheffield, Massachusetts. Competing alongside Jack Harrison and countryman Zeiko Lewis, Donawa was part of a Berkshire team that won NEPSAC Class A state titles in 2012, 2013, and 2014. He was selected to take part in the 2014 High School All-America Game, alongside Harrison and fellow NEPSAC players Francis Atuahene and Edward Opoku.

At club level, Donawa appeared for Black Rock FC during his time at the Berkshire School. He committed to play college soccer for coach Chad Riley and the Dartmouth Big Green.

== College and amateur ==
Donawa debuted for Dartmouth on 3 October 2015, coming off the bench in the Big Green's Ivy League opener against Princeton. He played 48 minutes of a 1–0 Dartmouth victory. Donawa scored his first collegiate goal on 24 October, tallying the game-winning goal in a 2–1 victory over Columbia, and scored his first NCAA tournament goal on 22 November as Dartmouth were eliminated in the second round by Syracuse. Although he appeared in just 10 games, Donawa tallied two goals and three assists and was named Honorable Mention All-Ivy. As a sophomore, Donawa won a regular spot in the Dartmouth lineup, putting up stats of three goals and four assists in 17 appearances. All three of his goals were game-winners: against Seattle on 11 September 2016, New Hampshire on 5 October, and Columbia on 22 October. Dartmouth won their third consecutive Ivy League crown and again advanced to the NCAA tournament, but were eliminated in the second round by Syracuse for the second consecutive season; Donawa was again named Honorable Mention All-Ivy.

As a junior, Donawa tallied three goals and a career and team-high eight assists in 17 appearances. He scored against UMass Lowell on 20 September 2017, the only goal of a 1–0 Dartmouth victory, added a goal and an assist in a 2–1 win over Princeton on 30 September, and scored in a 3–0 win over Hofstra on 3 October, all part of a three-goal, one-assist performance in a four-game span. He was an integral part of a Dartmouth team that claimed their fourth consecutive Ivy League championship, but did not take a kick in the penalty shootout as the Big Green were eliminated from the NCAA tournament by New Hampshire. Donawa was named First Team All-Ivy following the season. As a senior, Donawa missed much of the year due to injury, tallying two goals and an assist in just six appearances. He scored game-winning goals in back-to-back overtime victories, against Massachusetts on 22 September 2018 and Albany on 25 September, but would play his final collegiate game on 2 October against Vermont and miss the remainder of the season due to a sprained ankle. He finished his collegiate career with ten goals from 50 appearances.

=== Somerset Trojans ===
Donawa came through the youth setup at Somerset Trojans, playing in the Player Development League and the U-14 KO Cup. He made his senior debut for Somerset on 2 January 2014, appearing off the bench in the Friendship Trophy final as the Trojans claimed a 3–2 victory against Hamilton Parish. He continued to appear for Somerset for four more seasons, albeit infrequently as he could only play for the club while on breaks from school. Donawa returned to Somerset during the 2014–15 season, playing against Robin Hood in the Friendship Trophy and helping the club to claim their first Bermudian Premier Division title in 22 years. He was unable to appear in the title-deciding victory over Southampton Rangers, however, after suffering a sprained ankle while on international duty. Donawa helped the club to another championship in 2015–16, appearing in the Friendship Trophy while on holiday from school. He scored the final goal of a 3–0 victory against Hamilton Parish in the semifinals, giving Somerset the chance to win their eleventh Friendship Trophy after the new year. Against PHC Zebras in the final, Donawa scored the winning goal just before halftime as the Trojans claimed a 2–1 victory. On 12 December 2016, Donawa scored his first career Bermudian Premier League goal. His eighth-minute strike, off an assist from Hubert Buttersfield, helped Somerset claim a 2–2 draw against Devonshire Cougars. His second league goal had to wait until the 2017–18 season, coming in a 3–1 victory over X-Roads Warriors on 11 December 2017. He also added a goal in the semi-finals of the Expansion League Festive Tournament later that month and played the full 90 minutes in a 3–3 draw with North Village Rams on 17 March that clinched Premier Division safety for Somerset. The match against North Village would mark Donawa's final game with the club, as he was unable to participate during the 2018–19 season due to injury and a lack of international clearance.

=== Black Rock FC ===
Following his junior season at Dartmouth, Donawa was on the roster of Premier Development League expansion club Black Rock FC. He did not make an appearance as Black Rock qualified for the Eastern Conference semifinals.

== Club career ==
=== 2019 trials ===
Donawa was not selected to take part in the 2019 MLS Combine after struggling through an injury-ridden senior season at Dartmouth. He went on trial at Scottish Premiership club Aberdeen during December, and although he "definitely got good feedback" was not signed by the club. On 14 January 2019, Columbus Crew SC drafted Donawa with the 66th overall pick in the 2019 MLS SuperDraft. He joined the club for preseason as an unsigned draft pick, but was released midway through camp without earning a contract. Following his release, Donawa went on an unsuccessful trial with USL Championship club Pittsburgh Riverhounds SC. He continued his search for a club following the 2019 CONCACAF Gold Cup, moving to England and going on trial with National League North side Darlington. Donawa impressed manager Alun Armstrong during his trial, tallying a goal in a friendly against Northallerton Town while being described as "a game-changer" and "as good as gold".

=== Darlington ===
After impressing during his trial with Darlington, Donawa was offered a deal for the 2019–20 season. He joined fellow Bermudian international Osagi Bascome with the Quakers. Donawa made his debut for Darlington on 3 August 2019 in their 3–1 loss away at Farsley Celtic. He made his first start two weeks later in a 2–0 win at home to Southport, showing his pace on the left wing before being switched to right wing-back after a defensive injury. Donawa's first National League North goal was a late winner in Darlington's first away win of the season, against Alfreton Town. He continued as a regular in matchday squad, apart from when required for international duty, although became frustrated at being used as an impact substitute rather than in the starting eleven. According to the Northern Echo's review, Donawa "married electric pace with impressive aerial ability to score nine goals in his debut season", which made him the team's second highest scorer. He signed on for a second season, and added another two goals from five matches before leaving the club in October 2020.

=== Solihull Moors ===
On 27 October 2020, Donawa signed for Solihull Moors of the fifth-tier National League. The fee was undisclosed, but was understood by North East Sports News to be £15,000 plus add-ons. He made his debut four days later as a second-half substitute in a 3–1 defeat away to Maidenhead United. On 24 April 2021, he scored a hat-trick in a 5–1 win against Yeovil Town.

He was one of four players to be offered a new contract at the end of the 2022–23 season.

=== Altrincham ===
Donawa signed for Altrincham on 23 June 2023, becoming the club's seventh signing ahead of the 2023–24 National League season. He was a matchday regular in the early months of the season, but then missed several weeks through injury, and joined National League North club Chorley on an initial month's loan on 16 February 2024.

=== Brackley Town ===
On 26 November 2024, Donawa joined National League North side Brackley Town.

=== Hereford ===
On 2 January 2026, Donawa was released from his contract with Brackley and signed for National League North club Hereford, joining at the same time as fellow Bermudan international Keziah Martin. In April 2026, he left the club to return to his native Bermuda with his family.

== International career ==
Donawa first broke into the Bermudian international setup at the under-20 level, appearing during 2015 CONCACAF U-20 Championship qualifying. He received his first senior call-up for a training camp ahead of the first round of 2018 World Cup qualification and received his first cap in a friendly against Grenada on 6 March 2015. He played 58 minutes of a 2–2 draw before being substituted for Jalen Harvey. Donawa made his competitive debut for the Gombey Warriors on 25 March 2015, starting and scoring his first two international goals in a 5–0 World Cup qualifying victory against the Bahamas. His 57th- and 70th-minute goals were the fourth and fifth strikes of the night for Bermuda. Donawa continued to be called up during his time at Dartmouth, earning eight caps over his four years with the Big Green.

== Life outside of football ==
=== Personal life ===
Donawa is the nephew of Roger Trott, who played five List A cricket matches for Bermuda in the 1990s. Donawa's father, Jay, was a distance runner who competed at Auburn in the 1990s; his grandfather, Delwyn Trott, played for the inaugural Devonshire Colts side in the 1950s; and his younger brother Mateo played alongside him for Somerset Trojans. As a youth, Donawa played cricket for the Somerset Cricket Club, competing as a fast bowler. He was called into a training squad for the Bermuda national team in May 2016, but was forced to give up the sport while going to school in the United States.

=== Track and field career ===
Donawa began competing in track and field at the age of 14, winning a bronze medal in the boys' under-17 triple jump at the 2011 CARIFTA Games. He returned at the 2012 CARIFTA Games, winning a gold medal in the event with a jump of 14.63 metres. Donawa qualified for the 2012 Central American and Caribbean Junior Championships in Athletics, finishing second in the Male Junior B category. He also competed in the 2013 World Youth Championships in Athletics, placing seventh in the triple jump with a personal best of 15.65 metres.

At Dartmouth, Donawa continued to compete in the triple jump while also beginning to compete in the long jump. He placed second in the triple jump at the 2016 Ivy League Indoor Championship with a jump of 15.57 metres, his collegiate-best mark. In 2017, Donawa took 17th place at the NCAA East Regional during the outdoor season. In his final collegiate meet, the 2018 Ivy League Indoor Championships, Donawa won the Ivy League title with another 15.57 metre jump, making him the first Dartmouth athlete to win a team and individual Ivy League championship in two different sports since Adam Nelson in 1997.

Year	Competition	Venue	Position	Event	Notes
Representing Bermuda
2011	CARIFTA Games	Montego Bay, Jamaica	3rd	Triple jump	13.47 m (wind: –1.0 m/s)
2012	CARIFTA Games	Hamilton, Bermuda	1st	Triple jump	14.63 m (wind: +1.6 m/s)
2012	CARIFTA Games	Hamilton, Bermuda	4th	Long jump	6.42 m (wind: –0.5 m/s)
2012	Central American and Caribbean Junior Championships	San Salvador, El Salvador	2nd	Triple jump	14.49 m (wind: –0.3 m/s)
2013	CARIFTA Games	Nassau, Bahamas	5th	Triple jump	14.92 m (wind: –1.7 m/s)
2013	World Youth Championships	Donetsk, Ukraine	7th	Triple jump	15.65 m (wind: +1.1 m/s)
2014	CARIFTA Games	Fort-de-France, Martinique	4th	Triple jump	15.22 m (wind: +2.2 m/s)

== Career statistics ==
=== Club ===
As of match played 3 April 2026

Appearances and goals by club, season and competition
Club	Season	League			Cup		Continental		Other		Total	
Club	Season	Division	Apps	Goals	Apps	Goals	Apps	Goals	Apps	Goals	Apps	Goals
Somerset Trojans	2013–14	Bermudian Premier Division	0	0	0	0	—		1	0	1	0
Somerset Trojans	2014–15	Bermudian Premier Division	1	0	0	0	—		1	0	2	0
Somerset Trojans	2015–16	Bermudian Premier Division	0	0	0	0	0	0	2	2	2	2
Somerset Trojans	2016–17	Bermudian Premier Division	1	1	0	0	—		1	0	2	1
Somerset Trojans	2017–18	Bermudian Premier Division	2	1	0	0	—		1	0	3	1
Somerset Trojans	Total		4	2	0	0	0	0	6 (Note: All appearances in the Friendship Trophy)	2	10	4
Black Rock FC	2018	PDL	0	0	—		—		0	0	0	0
Darlington	2019–20	National League North	29	6 (Note: League goals figure includes Darlington's second goal against Chester on 7 December 2019, which Soccerway lists as an own goal, but Darlington's website, BBC Sport's results page, and the National League's website all give to Donawa.)	4	2	—		4 (Note: Appearance(s) in FA Trophy)	1	37	9
Darlington	2020–21	National League North	2	0	3	2	—		0	0	5	2
Darlington	Total		31	6	7	4	—		4	1	42	11
Solihull Moors	2020–21	National League	24	4	—		—		1	0	25	4
Solihull Moors	2021–22	National League	14	2	2	0	—		0	0	16	2
Solihull Moors	2022–23	National League	26	1	0	0	—		2	0	26	1
Solihull Moors	Total		64	7	2	0	—		3	0	69	7
Altrincham	2023–24	National League	20	3	0	0	—		0	0	20	3
Altrincham	2024–25	National League	0	0	0	0	—		1 (Note: Appearance in National League Cup)	0	1	0
Altrincham	Total		20	3	0	0	—		1	0	21	3
Chorley (loan)	2023–24	National League North	7	0	—		—		—		7	0
Brackley Town	2024–25	National League North	21	1	1	0	—		0	0	22	1
Brackley Town	2025–26	National League	10	0	0	0	—		0	0	10	0
Brackley Town	Total		31	1	1	0	—		0	0	32	1
Hereford	2025–26	National League North	13	1	—		—		1	0	14	1
Career total			170	20	10	4	0	0	15	3	195	29

=== International ===
As of match played 21 November 2023

Bermuda
Year	Apps	Goals
2015	5	2
2016	2	0
2017	2	0
2018	2	0
2019	9	1
2020	0	0
2021	2	0
2022	0	0
2023	4	0
Total	26	3

=== International goals ===
Scores and results list Bermuda's goal tally first.

International goals
No.	Date	Venue	Opponent	Score	Result	Competition
1	25 March 2015	Thomas Robinson Stadium, Nassau, The Bahamas	Bahamas	4–0	5–0	2018 FIFA World Cup qualification
2	25 March 2015	Thomas Robinson Stadium, Nassau, The Bahamas	Bahamas	5–0	5–0	2018 FIFA World Cup qualification
3	24 March 2019	Estadio Cibao, Santiago de los Caballeros, Dominican Republic	Dominican Republic	3–1	3–1	2019–20 CONCACAF Nations League qualification

== Honours ==
=== Football ===
Dartmouth

- Ivy League: 2015, 2016, 2017
- Honorable Mention All-Ivy: 2015, 2016
- First Team All-Ivy: 2017

Somerset Trojans

- Bermudian Premier Division: 2014–15
- Friendship Trophy: 2015–16

Black Rock FC

- Northeast Division: 2018

Brackley Town:

- National League North: 2024–25

=== Track and field ===
Dartmouth

- All-Ivy League (triple jump – indoors): 2016, 2018
