= 2016–17 Bermudian Premier Division =

Bermudian Premier Division
- Season: 2016–17
- Champions: Robin Hood
- Relegated: Somerset Eagles; Devonshire Colts
- Matches: 79
- Goals: 248 (3.14 per match)
- Biggest home win: PHC Zebras 6–1 Somerset Eagles; Robin Hood 5–0 Flanagan's Onions
- Biggest away win: Devonshire Colts 0–6 Robin Hood
- Highest scoring: Devonshire Colts 6–4 Dandy Town Hornets
- All statistics correct as of 8 March 2017.

The 2016–17 season of the Bermudian Premier Division (also known as the Cingular Wireless Premier Division for sponsorship reasons) is the 54th season of top-tier football in Bermuda. It started on 25 September 2016 and will finish on 19 March 2017. Dandy Town Hornets are the defending champions, having won their 8th top tier title last season.

== Changes from 2015–16 ==
At the end of the 2015–16 season, Southampton Rangers and Hamilton Parish were relegated after finishing 9th and 10th in the competition. They were replaced by the champions and runners-up of the First Division, Somerset Eagles and Flanagan's Onions.

== Teams ==
Team	Based	Stadium
Boulevard Blazers	Pembroke	Police Field
Dandy Town Hornets	Pembroke	Western Stars Sports Club Field
Devonshire Colts	Devonshire	Police Recreation Field
Devonshire Cougars	Devonshire	Devonshire Recreation Club
Flanagan's Onions	Hamilton	Bermuda Athletic Association Field
North Village Rams	Hamilton	Bernard Park
PHC Zebras	Warwick	Southampton Rangers Field
Robin Hood	Pembroke	Bermuda Athletic Association Field
Somerset Trojans	Somerset	Somerset Cricket Club Field
Somerset Eagles	Sandys	White Hill Field

== Table ==
Pos	Team	Pld	W	D	L	GF	GA	GD	Pts	Qualification or relegation
1	Robin Hood	18	13	2	3	40	9	+31	41	Qualification to the Caribbean Club Shield (Note: The champions of the Bermuda Premier Division were eligible to enter the 2018 Caribbean Club Shield. However, the Bermuda FA elected not to send any teams to the competition, meaning that Robin Hood did not participate.)
2	PHC Zebras	18	12	5	1	40	16	+24	41	
3	North Village Rams	18	12	3	3	32	20	+12	39	
4	Devonshire Cougars	18	7	6	5	22	21	+1	27	
5	Somerset Trojans	18	6	7	5	25	25	0	25	
6	Boulevard Blazers	18	6	5	7	28	32	−4	23	
7	Dandy Town Hornets	18	6	3	9	36	35	+1	21	
8	Flanagan's Onions	18	4	4	10	21	34	−13	16	
9	Somerset Eagles	18	2	6	10	20	37	−17	12	Relegation to the First Division
10	Devonshire Colts	18	1	1	16	19	54	−35	4	Relegation to the First Division

== Results ==
Home \ Away	BLVD	DTown	DCFC	DRC	FOFC	NVCC	PHC	RHFC	SCC	SBRC
Boulevard Blazers		3–2	4–1	1–2	1–3	2–4	0–3	1–0	2–2	2–0
Dandy Town Hornets	2–2		4–0	1–2	3–1	3–2	1–2	1–3	3–0	2–2
Devonshire Colts	0–1	6–4		0–2	0–2	0–1	1–2	0–6	0–5	1–2
Devonshire Cougars	0–0	0–3	2–1		3–1	3–1	0–2	0–1	1–1	1–3
Flanagan's Onions	2–2	1–5	3–1	1–2		0–1	2–2	1–3	0–0	1–1
North Village Rams	3–2	2–0	5–2	1–0	1–0		1–1	1–0	2–0	1–0
PHC Zebras	2–1	5–0	4–1	1–1	2–1	2–2		2–1	1–0	6–1
Robin Hood	3–0	2–1	1–0	0–0	5–0	1–1	1–0		3–1	3–0
Somerset Trojans	2–2	1–0	4–3	2–2	1–0	2–0	1–1	0–3		2–1
Somerset Eagles	1–2	1–1	2–2	1–1	1–2	2–3	1–2	0–4	1–1	

Legend: Blue = home team win; Yellow = draw; Red = away team win.
