= 2015–16 Bermudian Premier Division =

Bermudian Premier Division
- Season: 2015–16
- Champions: Dandy Town Hornets (8th title)
- Relegated: Southampton Rangers; Hamilton Parish
- CFU Club Championship: Dandy Town Hornets; Robin Hood
- Matches: 90
- Goals: 325 (3.61 per match)
- Biggest home win: Dandy Town Hornets 10-3 Hamilton Parish
- Biggest away win: Southampton Rangers 1-6 Robin Hood; Somerset Trojans 1-6 PHC Zebras; Devonshire Colts 0-5 Devonshire Cougars
- Highest scoring: Dandy Town Hornets 10-3 Hamilton Parish

The 2015–16 season of the Bermudian Premier Division (also known as the Cingular Wireless Premier Division for sponsorship reasons) is the 53rd season of top-tier football in Bermuda. It started on 27 September 2015 and finished on 10 April 2016. Somerset Trojans were the defending champions, having won their 10th top tier title last season. Dandy Town Hornets won their 8th title this season.

== Changes from 2014–15 ==
At the end of the 2014–15 season, Flanagan's Onions and St. George's Colts were relegated after finishing 9th and 10th in the competition. They were replaced by the champions and runners-up of the First Division, Boulevard Blazers and Devonshire Colts.

== Teams ==
Team	Based	Stadium
Boulevard Blazers	Pembroke	Police Field
Dandy Town Hornets	Pembroke	Western Stars Sports Club Field
Devonshire Colts	Devonshire	Police Recreation Field
Devonshire Cougars	Devonshire	Devonshire Recreation Club
Hamilton Parish	Hamilton	Wellington Oval
North Village Rams	Hamilton	Bernard Park
PHC Zebras	Warwick	Southampton Rangers Field
Robin Hood	Pembroke	Bermuda Athletic Association Field
Somerset Trojans	Somerset	Somerset Cricket Club Field
Southampton Rangers	Southampton	Southampton Oval

== Table ==
Pos	Team	Pld	W	D	L	GF	GA	GD	Pts	Qualification or relegation
1	Dandy Town Hornets (C)	18	14	2	2	59	19	+40	44	2017 CFU Club Championship
2	Robin Hood	18	10	2	6	37	26	+11	32	2017 CFU Club Championship
3	PHC Zebras	18	7	6	5	36	28	+8	27	
4	North Village Rams	18	7	6	5	29	23	+6	27	
5	Boulevard Blazers	18	6	6	6	34	33	+1	24	
6	Devonshire Cougars	18	7	2	9	24	27	−3	23	
7	Somerset Trojans	18	5	7	6	26	33	−7	22	
8	Devonshire Colts	18	4	7	7	32	42	−10	19	
9	Southampton Rangers (R)	18	3	8	7	25	45	−20	17	Relegation to First Division
10	Hamilton Parish (R)	18	2	4	12	23	49	−26	10	Relegation to First Division

Updated to match(es) played on 10 April 2016. Source: Bermuda FA
Rules for classification: 1) points; 2) goal difference; 3) number of goals scored.
(C) Champions; (R) Relegated

== Results ==
Home \ Away	BLVD	DAN	DCFC	DRC	HPFC	NVCC	PHC	RHFC	SCC	SRSC
Boulevard Blazers		2–3	1–1	0–0	4–3	2–1	2–1	0–2	1–3	6–0
Dandy Town Hornets	4–0		8–3	4–0	10–3	2–1	4–0	0–1	2–0	1–1
Devonshire Colts	1–1	0–2		0–5	1–3	3–3	2–1	1–2	3–5	2–2
Devonshire Cougars	4–2	2–1	1–4		3–0	1–0	1–2	0–2	1–3	2–0
Hamilton Parish	1–2	1–5	2–4	2–0		0–3	0–0	0–2	1–1	1–1
North Village Rams	3–1	0–1	1–0	1–0	3–1		2–0	3–2	0–0	1–1
PHC Zebras	1–1	1–2	3–3	3–1	2–2	2–2		2–0	2–2	4–2
Robin Hood	2–2	1–5	0–2	0–0	4–2	3–1	0–3		4–1	5–1
Somerset Trojans	2–2	0–2	1–1	1–2	1–0	2–2	1–6	2–1		0–2
Southampton Rangers	1–5	3–3	1–1	2–1	3–1	2–2	1–3	1–6	1–1	

Updated to match(es) played on 10 April 2016. Source: Bermuda FA
Legend: Blue = home team win; Yellow = draw; Red = away team win.
