= List of football clubs in Bermuda =

List of football clubs in Bermuda playing association football.

== Teams in USL ==
Bermuda Hogges are a 2007 expansion team, playing in the US league USL Second Division. They dissolved in 2013.

== Premier Division ==
- Boulevard Blazers
- St. George's Colts
- YMSC Bluebirds
- Dandy Town Hornets
- Devonshire Cougars
- North Village Community Club
- PHC Zebras
- Devonshire Colts
- Paget Lions
- X-Road Warriors

== First Division ==
- St.Davids Warriors
- Southampton Rangers
- Somerset Eagles
- Somerset Trojans
- Robin Hood FC
- Vasco Da Gama
- Wolves Sports Club

== Commercial ==
=== "A" ===
- B.A.A.
- DRC Lions
- Key West Rangers
- Lobster Pot
- MR Onions
- NVCC Rams
- PHC Commercial
- Robin Hood FC
- SBRC Peskies
- Tuff Dogs
- Valley

=== "B" ===
- Dandy Town Roots
- Devonshire Colts All Stars
- DockYard Falcons
- Hamilton Parish Commercial
- Pest Control
- Prison Officers RC
- SCC Extros
- St. George's All Stars
- Vasco Mariners
- Boulevard Commercial
- Prospect/Fire
- Wolves Commercial

== Ladies ==
- BISYS Royals
- Boulevard Ladies
- Dandy Stars
- Lady Cougars
- PHC Ladies
- SCC Hurricanes
