= 2014–15 Bermudian Premier Division =

Bermudian Premier Division
- Season: 2014–15
- Champions: Somerset Trojans
- Relegated: Flanagan's Onions; St. George's Colts
- Matches played: 90
- Goals scored: 279 (3.1 per match)
- Top goalscorer: Keston Lewis; Antwan Russell
- Biggest home win: Zebras 4-0 Rangers
- Biggest away win: Onions 1-5 Hamilton Parish; Onions 1-5 Zebras; Cougars 1-5 Rams; Onions 1-5 Hornets
- Highest scoring: Hornets 5-3 Onions

The 2014–15 Bermudian Premier Division is the 52nd season of the highest competitive football league in Bermuda, which was founded in 1963.

== Overview ==
The competition started in September 2014 and finished in March 2015. Dandy Town Hornets were the defending champions, having won their seventh league championship the season before.

Somerset Trojans won the league title in March 2015 after beating Southampton Rangers 3-0 on the final day of the competition, leaving Hornets trailing three points.

Flanagan's Onions and St. George’s Colts were relegated.

== Teams ==
Team	Based	Stadium
Dandy Town Hornets	Pembroke	Western Stars Sports Club Field
Devonshire Cougars	Devonshire	Devonshire Recreation Club
Flanagan's Onions	Pembroke	Bermuda Athletic Association Field
Hamilton Parish	Hamilton	Wellington Oval
North Village Rams	Hamilton	Bernard Park
PHC Zebras	Warwick	Southampton Rangers Field
Robin Hood	Pembroke	Bermuda Athletic Association Field
St. George’s Colts	St. George's	Wellington Oval
Somerset Trojans	Somerset	Somerset Cricket Club Field
Southampton Rangers	Southampton	Southampton Oval

== League table ==
Pos	Team	Pld	W	D	L	GF	GA	GD	Pts	Qualification or relegation
1	Somerset Trojans (C)	18	10	4	4	27	18	+9	34	
2	Dandy Town Hornets	18	9	4	5	43	35	+8	31	
3	PHC Zebras	18	9	3	6	34	24	+10	30	
4	Robin Hood	18	6	7	5	31	27	+4	25	
5	Hamilton Parish FC	18	7	3	8	23	24	−1	24	
6	Devonshire Cougars	18	7	3	8	20	24	−4	24	
7	North Village Rams	18	6	5	7	31	28	+3	23	
8	Southampton Rangers	18	5	5	8	19	27	−8	20	
9	Flanagan's Onions (R)	18	5	4	9	32	45	−13	19	Relegation to First Division
10	St. George’s Colts (R)	18	4	6	8	19	27	−8	18	Relegation to First Division

(C) Champions; (R) Relegated

== Top scorers ==
Rank	Scorer	Team	Goals
1	(Trinidad and Tobago) Keston Lewis	Dandy Town Hornets	12
1	(Bermuda) Antwan Russell	Robin Hood	12
