= 2012–13 Bermudian Premier Division =

Bermudian Premier Division
- Season: 2012–13
- Matches played: 90
- Goals scored: 332 (3.69 per match)
- Biggest home win: Hornets 4-0 Robin Hood; Cougars 4-0 Onions
- Biggest away win: Onions 0-9 Zebras
- Highest scoring: Onions 0-9 Zebras

The 2012–13 Bermudian Premier Division is the 50th season of the highest competitive football league in Bermuda, which was founded in 1963.

== Overview ==
The competition started in October 2012 and finished in March 2013. Dandy Town Hornets were the defending champions, having won their sixth league championship the season before.

Devonshire Cougars won the league title in March 2013 when Somerset Trojans beat Cougars' sole challengers North Village Rams to pull Rams out of the title race. Robin Hood and St. George’s Colts were relegated.

== Teams ==
Team	Based	Stadium
Dandy Town Hornets	Pembroke	Western Stars Sports Club Field
Devonshire Cougars	Devonshire	Devonshire Recreation Club
Flanagan's Onions	Pembroke	Bermuda Athletic Association Field
North Village Rams	Hamilton	Bernard Park
PHC Zebras	Warwick	Southampton Rangers Field
Robin Hood	Pembroke	Bermuda Athletic Association Field
St. George’s Colts	St. George's	Wellington Oval
Somerset Trojans	Somerset	Somerset Cricket Club Field
Southampton Rangers	Southampton	Southampton Oval
Wolves	Devonshire	Devonshire Recreation Club

== League table ==
Pos	Team	Pld	W	D	L	GF	GA	GD	Pts	Qualification or relegation
1	Devonshire Cougars (C)	18	12	5	1	46	22	+24	41	
2	PHC Zebras	18	10	3	5	44	24	+20	33	
3	Somerset Trojans	18	10	2	6	36	31	+5	32	
4	North Village Rams	18	9	4	5	36	26	+10	31	
5	Dandy Town Hornets	18	9	2	7	41	29	+12	29	
6	Southampton Rangers	18	7	3	8	35	37	−2	24	
7	Wolves	18	6	4	8	33	42	−9	22	
8	Flanagan's Onions	18	5	2	11	21	44	−23	17	
9	Robin Hood FC (R)	18	4	2	12	22	43	−21	14	Relegation to First Division
10	St. George’s Colts (R)	18	3	3	12	18	34	−16	12	Relegation to First Division

(C) Champions; (R) Relegated

== Top scorers ==
Rank	Scorer	Team	Goals
1	(Bermuda) Dennis Russell	Southampton Rangers	16
