= 2013–14 Bermudian Premier Division =

Bermudian Premier Division
- Season: 2013–14
- Matches played: 90
- Goals scored: 336 (3.73 per match)
- Biggest home win: Rams 6-0 Hamilton Parish
- Biggest away win: Zebras 0-6 Rams
- Highest scoring: Hornets 7-2 Cougars

The 2013–14 Bermudian Premier Division is the 51st season of the highest competitive football league in Bermuda, which was founded in 1963.

== Overview ==
The competition started in September 2013 and finished in March 2014. Devonshire Cougars were the defending champions, having won their fourth league championship the season before.

Dandy Town Hornets won the league title in March 2014 after beating Devonshire Cougars, with North Village Rams losing their match against already-relegated Wolves.

St. David's Warriors and Wolves were relegated, with both teams still hoping to stay up come the final day of the competition.

== Teams ==
Team	Based	Stadium
Dandy Town Hornets	Pembroke	Western Stars Sports Club Field
Devonshire Cougars	Devonshire	Devonshire Recreation Club
Flanagan's Onions	Pembroke	Bermuda Athletic Association Field
Hamilton Parish	Hamilton	Wellington Oval
North Village Rams	Hamilton	Bernard Park
PHC Zebras	Warwick	Southampton Rangers Field
Somerset Trojans	Somerset	Somerset Cricket Club Field
Southampton Rangers	Southampton	Southampton Oval
St. David's Warriors	St. David's	St. David's Cricket Club Field
Wolves	Devonshire	Devonshire Recreation Club

== League table ==
Pos	Team	Pld	W	D	L	GF	GA	GD	Pts	Qualification or relegation
1	Dandy Town Hornets (C)	18	11	4	3	49	25	+24	37	
2	North Village Rams	18	9	5	4	43	23	+20	32	
3	Flanagan's Onions	18	9	2	7	31	30	+1	29	
4	Somerset Trojans	18	7	6	5	28	29	−1	27	
5	Devonshire Cougars	18	6	8	4	36	34	+2	26	
6	Hamilton Parish FC	18	8	1	9	29	35	−6	25	
7	PHC Zebras	18	6	4	8	33	38	−5	22	
8	Southampton Rangers	18	5	3	10	32	35	−3	18	
9	St. David's Warriors (R)	18	4	5	9	23	44	−21	17	Relegation to First Division
10	Wolves (R)	18	4	4	10	32	43	−11	16	Relegation to First Division

(C) Champions; (R) Relegated

== Top scorers ==
Rank	Scorer	Team	Goals
1	(Trinidad and Tobago) Keston Lewis	Flanagan's Onions	15
