= Treble (association football) =

Accomplishment in Football

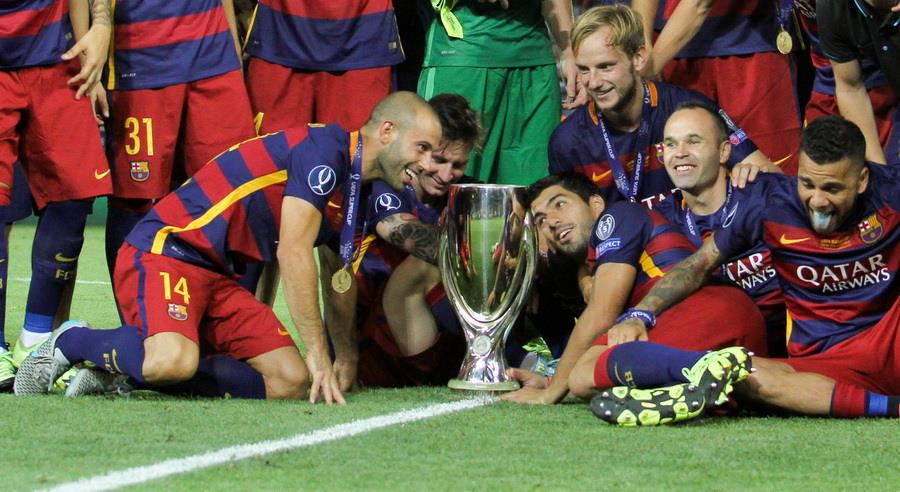
Barcelona are the first European men's football team to win a continental treble twice, in 2008–09 and in 2014–15 (pictured). Bayern Munich are currently the only other European club that has won two continental trebles.

A treble in association football is achieved when a club team wins three trophies in a single season. A continental treble involves winning the club's top-level domestic league competition, main domestic cup competition, and main continental trophy. Although winning a second-tier continental trophy (e.g. Europa League) or a third-tier continental trophy has also been described as a continental treble, it is not as widely accepted. A domestic treble involves winning three national competitions—including the league title, the primary cup competition, and one secondary competition, such as a league cup.

Competitions which consist of a single match or a two-leg match are not normally counted as part of a continental treble (e.g., the FA Community Shield, Supercopa de España, Supercoppa Italiana, Trophée des Champions, DFL-Supercup, UEFA Super Cup, Recopa Sudamericana, FIFA Club World Cup (2005–2023 editions), Intercontinental Cup and others).

== Continental trebles ==
This list includes clubs who have won their country's top-tier league and the primary cup competition (the double), in addition to the major continental tournament, all within a single season. Tokyo Verdy of Japan and Barcelona of Spain are the only clubs to win continental trebles for both their men's and women's sections, completing the feat in 2019 and 2021, respectively. Barcelona is the only club to win multiple trebles with both their men's and women's team, completing the feat in 2024.

=== Men ===
Twenty-three men's clubs have achieved the feat with 31 occurring in total, the first being Celtic of Scotland in May 1967, and then TP Mazembe (then known as FC Englebert) of the Democratic Republic of the Congo in November 1967. European teams have won the most continental trebles with eleven, by nine clubs. The only countries to have more than one team win a continental treble are Mexico, New Zealand, England and the Netherlands, with two teams winning trebles each.

No South American team has achieved the feat with the above stipulations, making it the only continent to never have a continental treble winner. Multiple Brazilian teams have won some combination of the Campeonato Brasileiro Série A, their state championship, the Copa do Brasil, and the now-defunct Taça Brasil, plus the Copa Libertadores, but never by winning the Série A, Copa do Brasil, and Copa Libertadores. (Note: In 1962, Santos won the Copa Libertadores, the Taça Brasil, and the Campeonato Paulista (São Paulo state championship). In 2019, Flamengo achieved a similar feat by capturing the Copa Libertadores, Campeonato Brasileiro Série A, and Campeonato Carioca (Rio de Janeiro state championship). In 2020, Palmeiras won the Copa Libertadores and the Copa do Brasil, along with the Campeonato Paulista.)

Five men's clubs have won the continental treble two or more times: Al Ahly of Egypt, Auckland City of New Zealand, Barcelona of Spain, Bayern Munich of Germany and Cruz Azul of Mexico. with Cruz Azul being the first team to achieve it in 1997. Al Ahly and Auckland City are the only teams with more than two continental trebles, with both having won four. Auckland City completed this achievement first, winning their third treble in 2015 and fourth in 2022. Al Ahly and Auckland City are also the only men's clubs to win trebles in back-to-back seasons, though Al Ahly were the first to do this after winning in both 2006 and 2007.

Confederation	Club	Country	Number won	Season	Titles won	Refs.
AFC	Yomiuri FC (currently Tokyo Verdy)	Japan	1	1987	Japanese First Division, Emperor's Cup, Asian Club Championship	
AFC	Al Hilal	Saudi Arabia	1	2019‍–‍20	Saudi Professional League, King's Cup, AFC Champions League	
CAF	Al Ahly	Egypt	4	2005‍–‍06, 2006‍–‍07, 2019‍–‍20, 2022‍–‍23	Egyptian Premier League, Egypt Cup, CAF Champions League	
CAF	Englebert (currently TP Mazembe)	DR Congo	1	1967	Linafoot, Coupe du Congo, African Cup of Champions	
CAF	Vita Club	Zaire	1	1973	Linafoot, Coupe du Congo, African Cup of Champions	
CAF	MC Alger	Algeria	1	1976	Algerian Championnat National, Algerian Cup, African Cup of Champions	
CAF	Hearts of Oak	Ghana	1	2000	Ghana Premier League, Ghanaian FA Cup, CAF Champions League	
CAF	Espérance Tunis	Tunisia	1	2011	Tunisian Ligue Professionnelle 1, Tunisian Cup, CAF Champions League	
CONCACAF	Cruz Azul	Mexico	2	1969, 1997	Mexican Primera División, Copa México, CONCACAF Champions' Cup	
CONCACAF	Defence Force	Trinidad and Tobago	1	1985	National League, Trinidad and Tobago Cup, CONCACAF Champions Cup	
CONCACAF	Monterrey	Mexico	1	2019‍–‍20	Liga MX, Copa MX, CONCACAF Champions League	
OFC	Auckland City	New Zealand	4	2005‍–‍06, 2013‍–‍14, 2014‍–‍15	NZFC Minor Premiership, NZFC Grand Final, OFC Champions League	
OFC	Auckland City	New Zealand	4	2022	New Zealand National League, Chatham Cup, OFC Champions League	
OFC	Waitakere United	New Zealand	1	2007‍–‍08	NZFC Minor Premiership, NZFC Grand Final, OFC Champions League	
OFC	Hienghène Sport	New Caledonia	1	2019	New Caledonia Super Ligue, New Caledonia Cup, OFC Champions League	
UEFA	Barcelona	Spain	2	2008‍–‍09, 2014‍–‍15	La Liga, Copa del Rey, UEFA Champions League	
UEFA	Bayern Munich	Germany	2	2012‍–‍13, 2019‍–‍20	Bundesliga, DFB-Pokal, UEFA Champions League	
UEFA	Celtic	Scotland	1	1966‍–‍67	Scottish Football League, Scottish Cup, European Cup	
UEFA	Ajax	Netherlands	1	1971‍–‍72	Eredivisie, KNVB Cup, European Cup	
UEFA	PSV Eindhoven	Netherlands	1	1987‍–‍88	Eredivisie, KNVB Cup, European Cup	
UEFA	Manchester United	England	1	1998‍–‍99	Premier League, FA Cup, UEFA Champions League	
UEFA	Inter Milan	Italy	1	2009‍–‍10	Serie A, Coppa Italia, UEFA Champions League	
UEFA	Manchester City	England	1	2022‍–‍23	Premier League, FA Cup, UEFA Champions League	
UEFA	Paris Saint-Germain	France	1	2024‍–‍25	Ligue 1, Coupe de France, UEFA Champions League	

=== Women ===
Ten women's clubs have won a continental treble with these stipulations, five of which are European clubs, one Asian, one African, one South American and two Oceanian club, with a total of 16 trebles across all the clubs. The first to do so was 1. FFC Frankfurt in 2002, who won the treble again in 2008. The only other women's club to achieve it more than once are Lyon, who has done so five times (a record for both men's and women's clubs) and Barcelona and Corinthians, who have achieved it twice each. Lyon are also the only women's club to win trebles in back to back years twice.

The lack of women's continental trebles compared to men's can largely be attributed to the absence of continental competitions for women until recently. The UEFA Women's Champions League did not begin until 2001, the Copa Libertadores Femenina did not begin until 2009, the AFC Women's Club Championship did not begin until 2019, the CAF Women's Champions League did not begin until 2021, the OFC Women's Champions League did not begin until 2023, and the CONCACAF W Champions Cup had its inaugural edition began only in August 2024. Additionally, many nations do not have a top level cup competition for women, and some do not even have a national women's football league.

Confederation	Club	Country	Number won	Seasons	Titles won	Refs.
AFC	Tokyo Verdy Beleza	Japan	1	2019	Nadeshiko League, Empress's Cup, AFC Women's Club Championship	
CAF	AS FAR	Morocco	2	2022‍–‍23, 2025‍–‍26	Moroccan Women's Championship, Moroccan Women Throne Cup, CAF Women's Champions League	
CONMEBOL	Corinthians	Brazil	2	2023, 2024	Campeonato Brasileiro Feminino Série A1, Supercopa do Brasil Feminino, Copa Libertadores Femenina	
OFC	Auckland United	New Zealand	2	2024, 2025	New Zealand Women's National League, Kate Sheppard Cup, OFC Women's Champions League	
OFC	AS Academy	New Caledonia	1	2023	New Caledonia Division 1 Féminine, New Caledonia Cup, OFC Women's Champions League	
UEFA	Lyon	France	5	2011‍–‍12, 2015‍–‍16, 2016‍–‍17, 2018‍–‍19, 2019‍–‍20	Division 1 Féminine, Coupe de France féminine, UEFA Women's Champions League	
UEFA	Barcelona	Spain	3	2020‍–‍21, 2023‍–‍24, 2025‍–‍26	Primera División, Copa de la Reina, UEFA Women's Champions League	
UEFA	1. FFC Frankfurt (currently Eintracht Frankfurt)	Germany	2	2001‍–‍02, 2007‍–‍08	Frauen-Bundesliga, DFB-Pokal Frauen, UEFA Women's Cup	
UEFA	Arsenal	England	1	2006‍–‍07	FA Women's Premier League, FA Women's Cup, UEFA Women's Cup	
UEFA	VfL Wolfsburg	Germany	1	2012‍–‍13	Frauen-Bundesliga, DFB-Pokal Frauen, UEFA Women's Champions League	

== Domestic trebles ==
A domestic treble is usually made up of the league, main domestic cup and the most prestigious secondary domestic cup (usually being a league cup, like the EFL Cup, Scottish League Cup, or the Thai League Cup). Usually super cups or regional titles, like the Brazilian states championships, Biscay Championship and Glasgow Cup, are not included in the treble, therefore domestic trebles are only possible in some countries, as most federations hold only one league and one cup competition, thus clubs from countries like Spain, Germany and France, who used to hold a secondary national cup but were discontinued, currently cannot achieve the domestic treble in the most accepted form. Domestic trebles that might include super cups, or regional titles, are considered to have an "asterisk" attached to it for not being perceived as a "genuine" achievements.

=== Men ===
76 men's clubs have won a domestic treble, 27 of whom have done it more than once, with 131 trebles occurring overall. The first team to win a domestic treble was Ireland's Shamrock Rovers in 1924–25. Scottish side Celtic has won the most domestic trebles, with eight. Celtic, Manchester City, Paris Saint-Germain and Bayern Munich are the only men's sides to have won both a domestic treble and a continental treble, but Celtic are the only one to win both in the same season. Celtic also hold the record for the most consecutive men's domestic trebles, with four.

Club	Country	Number won	Season(s) won	Titles won	Refs.
Celtic	Scotland	8	1966‍–‍67, 1968‍–‍69, 2000‍–‍01, 2016‍–‍17, 2017‍–‍18, 2018–19, 2019‍–‍20, 2022‍–‍23	Scottish League, Scottish Cup, Scottish League Cup	
Rangers	Scotland	7	1948‍–‍49, 1963‍–‍64, 1975‍–‍76, 1977‍–‍78, 1992‍–‍93, 1998‍–‍99, 2002‍–‍03	Scottish League, Scottish Cup, Scottish League Cup	
Buriram United	Thailand	6	2011, 2013, 2015, 2021‍–‍22, 2022‍–‍23, 2024‍–‍25	Thai League 1, Thai FA Cup, Thai League Cup	
Kitchee	Hong Kong	5	2011‍–‍12, 2014‍–‍15	Hong Kong First Division League, Hong Kong FA Cup, HKFA League Cup	
Kitchee	Hong Kong	5	2016‍–‍17, 2022‍–‍23	Hong Kong Premier League, Hong Kong FA Cup, Hong Kong Senior Challenge Shield	
Kitchee	Hong Kong	5	2017‍–‍18	Hong Kong Premier League, Hong Kong FA Cup, Hong Kong Sapling Cup (Note: Defunct competition)	
Ba	Fiji	4	1979, 2006, 2013, 2026	Fiji Premier League, Battle of the Giants, Inter-District Championship	
Club Franciscain	Martinique	4	1998‍–‍99, 2001‍–‍02, 2002‍–‍03, 2004‍–‍05	Martinique Championnat National, Coupe de la Martinique, Trophée du Conseil Général	
Istiklol	Tajikistan	4	2014, 2015, 2018, 2019	Tajikistan Higher League, Tajikistan Cup, TFF Cup	
Paris Saint-Germain	France	4	2014‍–‍15, 2015‍–‍16, 2017‍–‍18, 2019‍–‍20	Ligue 1, Coupe de France, Coupe de la Ligue	
Johor Darul Ta'zim	Malaysia	4	2022, 2023, 2024–25, 2025–26	Malaysia Super League, Malaysia FA Cup, Malaysia Cup	
Shamrock Rovers	Republic of Ireland	3	1924–25, 1931–32, 1963–64	League of Ireland, FAI Cup, League of Ireland Shield	
Somerset Trojans	Bermuda	3	1967‍–‍68, 1968‍–‍69, 1969‍–‍70	Bermudian Premier Division, Bermuda FA Cup, Friendship Trophy	
Saint-Pierroise	Réunion	3	1971, 1989, 2019	Réunion Premier League, Coupe de la Réunion, Coupe Régionale de France	
South China	Hong Kong	3	1987‍–‍88, 1990‍–‍91, 2006‍–‍07	Hong Kong First Division League, Hong Kong Senior Challenge Shield, Hong Kong FA Cup	
Linfield	Northern Ireland	3	1993‍–‍94, 2005‍–‍06, 2007‍–‍08	Irish League, Irish Cup, Irish League Cup	
The New Saints	Wales (Note: The club is situated in Oswestry, England, but competes in the competitions of neighbouring association, the Football Association of Wales.)	3	2014‍–‍15, 2015‍–‍16, 2024‍–‍25	Welsh Premier League, Welsh Cup, Welsh League Cup	
Kuwait SC	Kuwait	3	2016‍–‍17, 2018‍–‍19, 2024‍–‍25	Kuwait Premier League, Kuwait Emir Cup, Kuwait Crown Prince Cup	
North Village Rams	Bermuda	2	1977‍–‍78, 2005‍–‍06	Bermudian Premier Division, Bermuda FA Cup, Friendship Trophy	
Seiko	Hong Kong	2	1979‍–‍80, 1980‍–‍81	Hong Kong First Division League, Hong Kong Senior Challenge Shield, Hong Kong FA Cup	
Nissan Motor	Japan	2	1988‍–‍89, 1989‍–‍90	Japan Soccer League, Emperor's Cup, JSL Cup	
Nkana	Zambia	2	1989, 1993	Zambian Premier League, Zambian Cup, Chibuku Cup	
Eastern	Hong Kong	2	1992‍–‍93, 1993‍–‍94	Hong Kong First Division League, Hong Kong Senior Challenge Shield, Hong Kong FA Cup	
Sunrise Flacq United	Mauritius	2	1992, 1996	Mauritian League, Mauritian Cup, Mauritian Republic Cup	
Valletta	Malta	2	1996‍–‍97, 2000‍–‍01	Maltese Premier League, Maltese Cup, Löwenbräu Cup	
Al-Sadd	Qatar	2	2006-07, 2020-21	Qatar Stars League, Emir of Qatar Cup, Qatar Cup	
Kedah	Malaysia	2	2007, 2008	Malaysian Super League, Malaysia Cup, Malaysian FA Cup	
St Michel United	Seychelles	2	2008, 2011	Seychelles League, Seychelles FA Cup, Seychelles League Cup	
Al-Wehdat	Jordan	2	2008‍–‍09, 2010‍–‍11	Jordan League, Jordan FA Cup, Jordan FA Shield	
Melbourne Victory	Australia	2	2008‍–‍09	A-League Pre-Season Challenge Cup, A-League Premiership, A-League Grand Final	
Melbourne Victory	Australia	2	2015	A-League Premiership, A-League Grand Final, FFA Cup	
Albirex Niigata (S)	Singapore	2	2016, 2017	Singapore Premier League, Singapore Cup, Singapore League Cup	
Mamelodi Sundowns	South Africa	2	2019‍–‍20	Premier Soccer League, Nedbank Cup, Telkom Knockout	
Mamelodi Sundowns	South Africa	2	2021‍–‍22	Premier Soccer League, Nedbank Cup, MTN 8	
Bohemians	Republic of Ireland	1	1927‍–‍28	League of Ireland, FAI Cup, League of Ireland Shield	
Fall River	United States	1	1930	American Soccer League, National Challenge Cup, Lewis Cup	
Mufulira Wanderers	Zambia	1	1965	Zambian Premier League, Zambian Cup, Chibuku Cup	
Assaut	Martinique	1	1966	Martinique Championnat National, Coupe de la Martinique, Coupe de la France	
PHC Zebras	Bermuda	1	1970‍–‍71	Bermudian Premier Division, Bermuda FA Cup, Friendship Trophy	
Kabwe Warriors	Zambia	1	1972	Zambian Premier League, Zambian Cup, Chibuku Cup	
Saprissa	Cayman Islands	1	1972‍–‍73	Cayman Islands League, Cayman Islands FA Cup, Cayman Islands League Cup	
Arcadia Shepherds	South Africa	1	1974	NFL Championship, NFL Cup, NFL UTC Bowl Cup	
Mitsubishi	Japan	1	1978	Japan Soccer League, Emperor's Cup, JSL Cup	
Servette	Switzerland	1	1978‍–‍79	Nationalliga A, Swiss Cup, Swiss League Cup	
Cygne Noir	Guadeloupe	1	1982‍–‍83	Guadeloupe Division of Honour, Coupe de Guadeloupe, Coupe de France (Zone Guadeloupe)	
Levski Sofia	Bulgaria	1	1984	Bulgarian A Professional Football Group, Bulgarian Cup, Cup of the Soviet Army	
Kaizer Chiefs	South Africa	1	1984	NPSL First Division, Nedbank Cup, Telkom Knockout	
Nadroga	Fiji	1	1989	Fiji Premier League, Battle of the Giants, Inter-District Championship	
CSKA Sofia	Bulgaria	1	1989	Bulgarian A Professional Football Group, Bulgarian Cup, Cup of the Soviet Army	
Derry City	Republic of Ireland (Note: The club is situated in Northern Ireland, but competes in the competitions of neighbouring association, the Football Association of Ireland.)	1	1988‍–‍89	League of Ireland, FAI Cup, League of Ireland Cup	
Melbourne Knights	Australia	1	1994‍–‍95	NSL Cup, NSL Minor Premiership, NSL Grand Final	
ASFA Yennenga	Burkina Faso	1	1995	Burkinabé Premier League, Coupe du Faso, Coupe des Leaders	
ÍA	Iceland	1	1996	Úrvalsdeild karla, Icelandic Cup, Icelandic League Cup	
Barry Town United	Wales	1	1996‍–‍97	Welsh Premier League, Welsh Cup, Welsh League Cup	
Al-Ittihad	Saudi Arabia	1	1996–97	Saudi Premier League, Crown Prince Cup, Saudi Federation Cup	
Singapore Armed Forces	Singapore	1	1997	S. League, Singapore FA Cup, Singapore League Cup	
Bayern Munich	Germany	1	1999–2000	Bundesliga, DFB-Pokal, DFL-Ligapokal	
Kashima Antlers	Japan	1	2000	J. League, Emperor's Cup, J. League Cup	
Saint-Louisienne	Réunion	1	2002	Réunion Premier League, Coupe de la Réunion, Coupe Régionale de France	
US Stade Tamponnaise	Réunion	1	2003	Réunion Premier League, Coupe de la Réunion, Coupe Régionale de France	
Rhyl	Wales	1	2003‍–‍04	Welsh Premier League, Welsh Cup, Welsh League Cup	
Qadsia	Kuwait	1	2003–04	Kuwait Premier League, Kuwait Emir Cup, Kuwait Crown Prince Cup	
CAPS United	Zimbabwe	1	2004	Zimbabwe Premier Soccer League, ZIFA Cup, Buddie Challenge Cup	
Sun Hei	Hong Kong	1	2004‍–‍05	Hong Kong League, Hong Kong Senior Shield, Hong Kong FA Cup	
Port-Louis 2000	Mauritius	1	2005	Mauritian League, Mauritian Cup, Mauritian Republic Cup	
Curepipe Starlight	Mauritius	1	2008	Mauritian League, Mauritian Cup, Mauritian Republic Cup	
Joe Public	Trinidad and Tobago	1	2009	TT Pro League, FA Trophy, Pro Bowl	
Al-Muharraq	Bahrain	1	2009	Bahraini Premier League, Bahraini King's Cup, Bahraini FA Cup	
Debrecen	Hungary	1	2009‍–‍10	Nemzeti Bajnokság I, Magyar Kupa, Ligakupa	
Al-Faisaly	Jordan	1	2011‍–‍12	Jordan League, Jordan FA Cup, Jordan FA Shield	
Kelantan	Malaysia	1	2012	Malaysian Super League, Malaysia Cup, Malaysian FA Cup	
Moulien	Guadeloupe	1	2012‍–‍13	Guadeloupe Division of Honour, Coupe de Guadeloupe, Coupe de France (Zone Guadeloupe)	
Sheikh Russel	Bangladesh	1	2012‍–‍13	Bangladesh Premier League, Federation Cup, Independence Cup	
Mbabane Swallows	Eswatini	1	2012‍–‍13	Swazi Premier League, Swazi FA Cup, Castle Premier Challenge	
Devonshire Cougars	Bermuda	1	2012‍–‍13	Bermudian Premier Division, Bermuda FA Cup, Friendship Trophy	
Benfica	Portugal	1	2013–14	Primeira Liga, Taça de Portugal, Taça da Liga	
W Connection	Trinidad and Tobago	1	2013‍–‍14	TT Pro League, FA Trophy, Pro Bowl	
Gamba Osaka	Japan	1	2014	J. League, Emperor's Cup, J. League Cup	
FCSB	Romania	1	2014‍–‍15	Liga I, Cupa României, Cupa Ligii	
Maccabi Tel Aviv	Israel	1	2014‍–‍15	Israeli Premier League, Israel State Cup, Toto Cup	
Toronto FC	Canada (Note: The club is situated in Canada and competes in the Canadian Championship, but otherwise competes in the competitions of neighbouring association, United States Soccer Federation.)	1	2017	Supporters' Shield, MLS Cup, Canadian Championship	
Sydney FC	Australia	1	2017	A-League Premiership, A-League Grand Final, FFA Cup	
Al-Duhail	Qatar	1	2018	Qatar Stars League, Emir of Qatar Cup, Qatar Cup	
Manchester City	England	1	2018–19	Premier League, FA Cup, EFL Cup	
Pakhtakor Tashkent	Uzbekistan	1	2019	Uzbekistan Super League, Uzbekistan Cup, Uzbekistan League Cup	
Ahal	Turkmenistan	1	2022	Turkmenistan Higher League, Turkmenistan Cup, Turkmenistan Federation Cup	
Weymouth Wales	Barbados	1	2023	Barbados Premier Division, Barbados FA Cup, Republic Cup	
Bashundhara Kings	Bangladesh	1	2023‍–‍24	Bangladesh Premier League, Federation Cup, Independence Cup	
Virgin Gorda United	British Virgin Islands	1	2024-25	BVIFA National Football League, FA Cup, President's Cup	
Arkadag	Turkmenistan	1	2025	Ýokary Liga, Turkmenistan Cup, Turkmenistan Federation Cup	

=== Women ===
Eight women's clubs have won domestic trebles, and three of those teams have won their domestic treble more than once, for a total of 16 trebles overall. Scotland's Glasgow City and Arsenal of England have won the most domestic trebles, with five each. Glasgow City also have the most consecutive women's domestic trebles with four, while Arsenal were the first women's team to win a domestic treble when they won it in 1992–93. They, along with Tokyo Verdy Beleza of Japan and Corinthians of Brazil. are the only women's clubs to win both a continental treble and a domestic treble, and each team won the domestic treble in the same season they won the continental treble (2007 for Arsenal, 2019 for Tokyo Verdy and 2023 for Corinthians).

Club	Country	Number won	Season(s) won	Titles won	Refs.
Arsenal	England	5	1992‍–‍93, 2000‍–‍01, 2006‍–‍07, 2008‍–‍09	FA Women's Premier League, FA Women's Cup, FA Women's Premier League Cup	
Arsenal	England	5	2011	FA WSL, FA Women's Cup, FA Women's League Cup	
Glasgow City	Scotland	5	2008‍–‍09, 2011‍–‍12, 2012‍–‍13, 2013‍–‍14, 2014‍–‍15	Scottish Women's Premier League, Scottish Women's Cup, SWPL Cup	
Tokyo Verdy Beleza	Japan	3	2010, 2018, 2019	Nadeshiko League, Empress's Cup, Nadeshiko League Cup	
Chelsea	England	2	2020‍–‍21, 2024‍–‍25	Women's Super League, Women's FA Cup, Women's League Cup	
Fulham	England	1	2002–03	FA Women's Premier League, FA Women's Cup, FA Women's Premier League Cup	
Jiangsu Suning	China	1	2019	Chinese Women's Super League, Chinese Women's National Championship, Chinese Women's FA Cup	
Wuhan Jianghan University	China	1	2023	Chinese Women's Super League, Chinese Women's National Championship, Chinese Women's FA Cup	
Benfica	Portugal	1	2023‍–‍24	Campeonato Nacional Feminino, Taça de Portugal Feminina, Taça da Liga Feminina	

== See also ==
- Double (association football)
- Sextuple (association football)
- List of association football teams to have won four or more trophies in one season
- List of football clubs by competitive honours won
- Triple Crown of Brazilian Football
