= Shayne Hollis =

Bermudian footballer

Personal information
- Full name: Shayne Hollis
- Date of birth: 2 April 1989 (age 37)
- Place of birth: Bermuda
- Position: Forward

Team information
- Current team: Southampton Rangers

Youth career
- 2008–2013: CBU Capers

Senior career*
Years	Team	Apps	(Gls)
2008–2009	North Village Rams		
2010	Bermuda Hogges	13	(1)
2011–2012	Somerset Trojans		
2012–2015	Hamilton Parish		
2015–	North Village Rams		

International career^{‡}
2007	Bermuda	1	(0)
- * Club domestic league appearances and goals as of February 28, 2011 ‡ National team caps and goals as of February 28, 2011

Shayne Hollis (born April 2, 1989 ) is a Bermudian international footballer, who currently plays for Southampton Rangers.

== Club career ==
Hollis played in the 2010 season for the Bermuda Hogges in the USL Premier Development League. 2010 and 2011 played during the vacation with Island Soccer League club Knights. In the vacation of 2012 played for Bermudian Premier Division club Somerset Trojans. On 8 December 2012 was selected for the MLS Combine Draft. He was than on 9 January 2013 selected for the USL pro-combine, but he was not pulled by any club. He played after his resign for Island Soccer League club Knights.

He joined North Village Rams from Hamilton Parish in August 2015.

== International career ==
Hollis won only a solo cap for the Bermuda national football team against Canada in 2007.
