= 2017–18 Bermudian Premier Division =

Bermudian Premier Division
- Season: 2017–18
- Champions: PHC Zebras

The 2017–18 season of the Bermudian Premier Division (also known as the Digicel Premier Division for sponsorship reasons) is the 55th season of top-tier football in Bermuda. It started on September 23, 2017, and ended on April 5, 2018, with PHC Zebras being crowned champions.

== Standings ==
Pos	Team	Pld	W	D	L	GF	GA	GD	Pts	Qualification or relegation
1	PHC Zebras	18	13	3	2	71	14	+57	42	
2	Robin Hood	18	12	3	3	67	24	+43	39	
3	Dandy Town Hornets	18	11	3	4	52	25	+27	36	
4	Devonshire Cougars	18	8	5	5	34	27	+7	29	
5	North Village Rams	18	8	5	5	35	31	+4	29	
6	Somerset Trojans	18	6	4	8	32	46	−14	22	
7	Boulevard Blazers	18	6	4	8	33	55	−22	22	
8	X-Roads Warriors	18	6	2	10	34	43	−9	20	
9	Flanagan's Onions	18	3	3	12	26	61	−35	12	Relegation to Bermuda First Division
10	YMSC Bluebirds	18	0	2	16	17	75	−58	2	Relegation to Bermuda First Division

Source: RSSSF
