= Ajai Daniels =

Bermudian footballer

Personal information
- Date of birth: 1 July 1998 (age 28)
- Position: Goalkeeper

Team information
- Current team: Devonshire Cougars

Senior career*
Years	Team	Apps	(Gls)
- Dandy Town Hornets
- Southampton Rangers
2019–	Devonshire Cougars		

International career^{‡}
- Bermuda U17
2017–	Bermuda	1	(0)
- * Club domestic league appearances and goals as of 22:30, 19 August 2019 (UTC) ‡ National team caps and goals as of 22:30, 19 August 2019 (UTC)

Ajai Daniels (born 1 July 1998) is a Bermudian international footballer who plays for Devonshire Cougars, as a goalkeeper.

== Club career ==
Daniels began his career with Dandy Town Hornets. In March 2018, Daniels saved a penalty for Southampton Rangers in a Bermuda FA Cup semi-final penalty shoot-out against Paget Lions. In the summer of 2019, Daniels joined Devonshire Cougars.

== International career ==
In 2014, Daniels represented Bermuda under-17's in the Mexico Cup of Nations tournament, before picking up an injury against their Chilean counterparts.

On 22 January 2017, Daniels made his international debut for Bermuda in a 4–2 loss against Canada.
