= Tokia Russell =

Bermudan footballer (1977–2016)

Personal information
- Full name: Tokia Russell
- Date of birth: August 15, 1977
- Place of birth: Bermuda
- Date of death: June 22, 2016 (aged 38)
- Height: 5 ft 9 in (1.75 m)
- Position: Defender

Senior career*
Years	Team	Apps	(Gls)
2008–2009	PHC Zebras		
2009	Bermuda Hogges	11	(0)
2009–2012	Dandy Town Hornets		
2012–2013	Southampton Rangers		

International career
2000–2004	Bermuda	8	(1)
- * Club domestic league appearances and goals as of 11 October 2009

Tokia Russell (August 15, 1977 – June 22, 2016) was a Bermudian football player.

== Club career ==
Russell began his career with the PHC Zebras, and played for the team for two years in the Bermudian Premier Division before joining the Bermuda Hogges in the USL Second Division in 2009. In August 2009, he switched Zebras for Dandy Town Hornets.

He joined Southampton Rangers from Dandy Town for the 2012–13 season.

== International career ==
He made his debut for Bermuda in a January 2000 friendly match against Canada and earned a total of 8 caps, scoring 1 goal. He has represented his country in 4 FIFA World Cup qualification matches.

His final international match was a November 2004 CONCACAF Gold Cup qualification match against the British Virgin Islands.

=== International goals ===
Scores and results list Bermuda's goal tally first.

N.	Date	Venue	Opponent	Score	Result	Competition	Refs
1.	19 March 2000	National Stadium, Hamilton, Bermuda	British Virgin Islands	2–0	9–0	2002 FIFA World Cup qualification	

== Personal life ==
Tokia's younger brother Antwan Russell also plays for Bermuda. His grandfather Earl is regarded as one of Bermuda's best ever players.

In 2011, Tokia was fined for drunk driving after crashing his car.

Tokia was killed by a driver on June 22, 2016, in a car accident. Toe (as friends and family called him), was a motorist and died at the scene.

Tokia leaves behind him 2 children: a son Tokia Jnr and a daughter - Tazara.
