= Lashun Dill =

Bermudian footballer

Personal information
- Full name: Lashun Dill
- Date of birth: September 6, 1979 (age 47)
- Place of birth: Bermuda
- Height: 6 ft 2 in (1.88 m)
- Position: Winger

Senior career*
| Years | Team | Apps | (Gls) |
| 2003–2011 | Dandy Town Hornets | | |
| 2007–2012 | Bermuda Hogges | 67 | (9) |
| 2011–2012 | North Village Rams | | |

International career^{‡}
| 2007–2011 | Bermuda | 7 | (0) |
- * Club domestic league appearances and goals as of November 14, 2011 ‡ National team caps and goals as of 3 January 2015

Lashun Dill (born September 6, 1979) is a Bermudian footballer.

== Club career ==
Dill began his career with Dandy Town Hornets, and played for the team for three years in the Bermudian Premier Division before joining the Bermuda Hogges in the USL Second Division in 2007. He also played for North Village Rams and currently plays in the veteran's Corona League for Butterfield & Vallis United.

== International career ==
He made his debut for Bermuda in a March 2007 friendly match against Canada and earned a total of 7 caps, scoring no goals. He has represented his country in 3 FIFA World Cup qualification matches.

His final international match was a November 2011 World Cup qualification match against Barbados.
