= Aljame Zuill =

Bermudian footballer (born 1976)

Personal information
- Date of birth: 10 August 1976 (age 50)
- Place of birth: Bermuda
- Position: Striker

Senior career*
Years	Team	Apps	(Gls)
1999–2004	Devonshire Colts		
2005–2008	Devonshire Cougars	23	(2)
2008	Bermuda Hogges	9	(2)

International career^{‡}
2004–2008	Bermuda	10	(4)
- * Club domestic league appearances and goals as of 22 December 2010 ‡ National team caps and goals as of 22 December 2010

Aljame Zuill (born 10 August 1976) is a Bermudian retired international footballer who played as a striker.

== Club career ==
Zuill played as a striker with Devonshire Colts and Devonshire Cougars in the Bermudian Premier Division before joining the Bermuda Hogges in the USL Second Division.

In September 2011 Zuill moved to Dandy Town Hornets from Devonshire Cougars and then left Dandy Town for Wolves in summer 2012. He later played in Bermuda's veteran players' Corona League for North Village Rams.

== International career ==
He made his debut for Bermuda in a November 2004 CONCACAF Gold Cup qualification match against the Cayman Islands and earned a total of 11 caps, scoring 4 goals. He scored a hattrick in a December 2007 friendly match against St Kitts and Nevis.

His final international match was a January 2008 friendly match against Puerto Rico.

=== International goals ===
Scores and results list Bermuda's goal tally first.

N.	Date	Venue	Opponent	Score	Result	Competition	Ref
1.	29 September 2006	Lionel Roberts Park, Charlotte Amalie, U.S. Virgin Islands	Dominican Republic	1–0	3–1	2007 Caribbean Cup qualification	
2.	16 December 2007	National Stadium, Hamilton, Bermuda	Saint Kitts and Nevis		4–2	Friendly match	
3.	16 December 2007	National Stadium, Hamilton, Bermuda	Saint Kitts and Nevis		4–2	Friendly match	
4.	16 December 2007	National Stadium, Hamilton, Bermuda	Saint Kitts and Nevis		4–2	Friendly match	
