= Jared Peniston =

Bermudian footballer (born 1982)

Personal information
- Full name: Jared Peniston
- Date of birth: August 28, 1982 (age 44)
- Place of birth: Bermuda
- Height: 5 ft 8 in (1.73 m)
- Position: Defender

Senior career*
Years	Team	Apps	(Gls)
2003–2007	Dandy Town Hornets		
2007–2010	Bermuda Hogges	55	(4)
2008–2009	North Village Rams		
2009–2011	Dandy Town Hornets		
2011–2013	Wolves		

International career
2003–2004	Bermuda	6	(0)
- * Club domestic league appearances and goals as of August 8, 2010

Jared Peniston (born August 28, 1982) is a Bermudian retired football player.

== Career ==
=== Club ===
Peniston began his career with Dandy Town Hornets, and played for the team for six years in the Bermudian Premier Division before joining the Bermuda Hogges in the USL Second Division in 2007. He kept playing in Bermuda for North Village Rams and Dandy Town Hornets in the US off season before leaving them in summer 2011 for Wolves.

He retired in April 2013, after skippering Wolves to Bermudian Premier Division survival. He became an assistant to Wolves' coach Mark Jennings a season later.

=== International ===
He made his debut for Bermuda in a December 2003 friendly match against Barbados and earned a total of 6 caps, scoring no goals. He has represented his country in 9 FIFA World Cup qualification matches.

His final international match was an April 2004 friendly match against Nicaragua.
