= Jomei Bean-Lindo =

Bermudian footballer

Personal information
- Date of birth: 9 May 1998 (age 28)
- Position: Left back

Team information
- Current team: Dandy Town Hornets

Senior career*
Years	Team	Apps	(Gls)
2016–2019	Devonshire Colts		
2019–	Dandy Town Hornets		

International career^{‡}
2020–	Bermuda	4	(0)
- * Club domestic league appearances and goals as of 01:23, 26 February 2022 (UTC) ‡ National team caps and goals as of 01:23, 26 February 2022 (UTC)

Jomei Bean-Lindo (born 9 May 1998) is a Bermudian international footballer who plays for Dandy Town Hornets, as a left back.

== Career ==
Bean-Lindo is currently playing football for Dandy Town Hornets. He made his international debut for Bermuda in 2020.
