= Nigel Burgess (footballer) =

Bermudian footballer

Personal information
- Full name: Lyndon Nigel Burgess
- Date of birth: 17 November 1981 (age 44)
- Place of birth: Bermuda
- Height: 6 ft 0 in (1.83 m)
- Position: Goalkeeper

College career
Years	Team	Apps	(Gls)
- Howard Bison

Senior career*
Years	Team	Apps	(Gls)
2004–2006	Hamilton Parish		
2007–????	Bermuda Hogges	18	(0)
- Hamilton Parish

International career
2005–	Bermuda	6	(0)
- * Club domestic league appearances and goals as of 11 October 2009

Lyndon Nigel Burgess (born 17 November 1981) is a Bermudian sportsman. Best known for his football career as goalkeeper, playing for the Bermuda national team, he was also capped by the Bermuda national rugby union team.

== Football career ==
Burgess attended Howard University in the United States, where he studied for a master's degree in electrical engineering and played for the Howard Bison in the NCAA tournament. He then returned to Bermuda and played for Hamilton Parish, and played for the team for three years in the Bermudian Premier Division. In 2007 he was signed by USL Second Division club Bermuda Hogges.

He later returned to Hamilton Parish, and became club secretary, a role previously held by his father.

== Rugby career ==
Burgess also played rugby union for the Bermuda Police club, playing as a left wing. In 2015 he was called up to play for the Bermuda rugby union team, winning his first cap against Turks & Caicos.
