= Milai Perott =

Bermudian footballer (born 2003)

Personal information
- Date of birth: 12 April 2004 (age 22)
- Place of birth: Paget Parish, Bermuda
- Height: 1.90 m (6 ft 3 in)
- Position: Goalkeeper

Team information
- Current team: Corby Town

Youth career
- 2008–2021: Dandy Town Hornets
- 2021–2023: FCV Grace Dieu
- 2023–2024: Notts County

Senior career*
Years	Team	Apps	(Gls)
2020–2022	Dandy Town Hornets	3	(0)
2022–2023	FCV Grace Dieu	14	(0)
2024–2026	Notts County	0	(0)
2026–	Corby Town	7	(0)

International career^{‡}
2018	Bermuda U14	1	(0)
2019	Bermuda U15	2	(0)
2021	Bermuda U20	3	(0)
2025–	Bermuda	4	(0)
- * Club domestic league appearances and goals as of 15 October 2026 ‡ National team caps and goals as of 15 October 2026

Milai Perott (born 12 April 2004) is a Bermudian professional footballer who plays as a goalkeeper for Corby Town and the Bermuda national team.

== Career ==
A product of the youth academy of the Bermudian club Dandy Town Hornets, Perott moved to England with FCV International Academy before joining Notts County's youth academy on 18 November 2023. On 11 September 2024, he signed his first professional contract with Notts County.

After being released by Notts County in July 2026, he signed for Corby Town in August.

== International career ==
He was first called up to the Bermuda national team for a set of CONCACAF Nations League matches in September 2024. He debuted with the senior Bermuda national team in a 2–2 2026 FIFA World Cup qualification tie with Trinidad and Tobago on 18 November 2025.

== Honours ==
Dandy Town Hornets

- Bermuda FA Cup: 2022
