= Blenn Bean =

Bermudian footballer

Personal information
- Full name: Blenn Bean
- Date of birth: February 13, 1977 (age 49)
- Place of birth: Bermuda
- Height: 6 ft 1 in (1.85 m)
- Position: Defender

Senior career*
Years	Team	Apps	(Gls)
2003–2007	PHC Zebras		
2008–2009	Bermuda Hogges	31	(1)
2010	PHC Zebras		

International career^{‡}
2000–2007	Bermuda	12	(0)
- * Club domestic league appearances and goals as of 11 October 2009 ‡ National team caps and goals as of 23 December 2015

Blenn Bean (born February 13, 1977) is a retired Bermudian football player.

== Club career ==
Bean began his career with PHC Zebras, and played for the team for five years in the Bermudian Premier Division before joining the Bermuda Hogges in the USL Second Division in 2008.

== International career ==
He made his debut for Bermuda in a January 2000 friendly match against Canada and earned a total of 12 caps, scoring no goals.

His final international match was a January 2007 CONCACAF Gold Cup qualification match against Haiti.
