= Mauriq Hill =

Bermudian footballer (born 1995)

Personal information
- Date of birth: 22 July 1995 (age 31)
- Place of birth: Hamilton, Bermuda
- Height: 5 ft 10 in (1.78 m)
- Positions: Midfielder; defender

Youth career
- 2003–2009: Devonshire Cougars

College career
Years	Team	Apps	(Gls)
2014–2016	Clemson Tigers	25	(2)
2017	Pittsburgh Panthers	14	(0)

Senior career*
Years	Team	Apps	(Gls)
2009–2014	Devonshire Cougars		
2017	SIMA Águilas	14	(1)

International career
2012	Bermuda U17		
- Bermuda U20
2015–2016	Bermuda	3	(0)
- * Club domestic league appearances and goals

Mauriq Hill (born 22 July 1995) is a Bermudian former footballer who played as a midfielder, although has been known to play as a defender. He made three appearances for the Bermuda national team.

== Club career ==
Hill was born in Hamilton, Bermuda. From the age of 14, he was playing for Bermudian Premier Division side Devonshire Cougars, as well as the Bermuda U-17s. In 2014, he began to play for Clemson Tigers, at the university in which he is majoring in management, where he was given the Number 5 shirt. Prior to the 2017 season, Hill transferred from Clemson to the Pittsburgh Panthers

== International career ==
Hill made his senior international debut on 6 March 2015 in a 2–2 draw against Grenada, where he received a yellow card. He played in his first win two days later, also against Grenada. His last game for his country was against Saint Kitts and Nevis on 21 February 2016. Saint Kitts & Nevis proved 3–0 victors.
