= Dennis Brown (Bermudian footballer) =

Bermudian footballer and manager

Personal information
- Place of birth: Bermuda
- Position: Defender

Team information
- Current team: Somerset Trojans (techn. dir.)

International career
Years	Team	Apps	(Gls)
–1992	Bermuda		

Managerial career
- 1996–2002: Wolves
- 2003–2011: Somerset Trojans
- 2011–2014: Devonshire Cougars
- 2012–2016: Bermuda
- 2013–2016: Bermuda U-20

Dennis Brown is a retired Bermudian football player, nowadays working as a football manager.

== Playing career ==
=== International ===
He has played for the Bermuda national football team. His final international match was a November 1992 FIFA World Cup qualification match against Canada.

== Managerial career ==
He was a head coach of the SCC Trojan, leaving them for Devonshire Cougars in summer 2011.

Since 15 August 2012 he coached the Bermuda national football team together with Andrew Bascome. In October 2013 he was named coach of Bermuda U-20 while still coach of Cougars.

He won the so-called "Triple Crown" of Premier Division, FA Cup and Friendship Trophy with Cougars in the 2012/13 season. In April 2014 Brown resigned as coach of Devonshire Cougars to focus on his own football school and the Bermuda U-20's. He later returned to Somerset Trojans in the role of technical director.
