= Bermuda FA Cup =

Association football tournament in Bermuda

- Founded: 1955
- Region: Bermuda
- Teams: varies

The Bermudian FA Cup is the top knockout tournament for football in Bermuda. It was created in 1955 and is overseen by the Bermuda Football Association.

== Winners ==
Year	Winner	Score	Runner-up
1956	BAA Wanderers	3–1	Southampton Rangers
1957	PHC Zebras	4–3	Pembroke Juniors
1958	Wellington Rovers	4–2	BAA Wanderers
1959	Dock Hill Rangers	3–1	Devonshire Lions
1960	PHC Zebras	2–1	Dock Hill Rangers
1961	PHC Zebras	2–1	Young Men's Social Club
1962	PHC Zebras	4–3	West End
1963	Young Men's Social Club	3–1	Pembroke Juniors
1964	Young Men's Social Club	3–1	Dock Hill Rangers
1965	Young Men's Social Club	3–1	Dock Hill Rangers
1966	Casuals	2–1	North Village
1967	PHC Zebras	3–2	Devonshire Colts
1968	Somerset Trojans	3–2	Devonshire Colts
1969	Somerset Trojans	6–0	Southampton Rangers
1970	Somerset Trojans	3–1	Academicals
1971	PHC Zebras	1–0	Devonshire Colts
1972	Somerset Trojans	2–1	PHC Zebras
1973	Devonshire Colts	4–3	PHC Zebras
1974	Devonshire Colts	3–0	WWC
1975	PHC Zebras	3–1	Somerset Trojans
1976	Somerset Trojans	2–1	Devonshire Colts
1977	Somerset Trojans	3–1	Southampton Rangers
1978	North Village	3–1	Pembroke Hamilton Club
1979	Somerset Trojans	4–0	Devonshire Cougars
1980	Pembroke Hamilton Club	4–1	Warwick
1981	Vasco da Gama FC	3–1	Somerset Trojans
1982	Vasco da Gama FC	3–1	Pembroke Hamilton Club
1983	North Village	2–1	Vasco da Gama FC
1984	Southampton Rangers	1–1 (2–0 replay)	Devonshire Colts
1985	Hotels International FC	2–1	Pembroke Hamilton Club
1986	North Village	2–0	Vasco da Gama FC
1987	Dandy Town	2–2 (1–0 replay)	Pembroke Hamilton Club
1988	Somerset Trojans	0–0 (2–1 replay)	Devonshire Colts
1989	North Village	2–1	Pembroke Hamilton Club
1990	Somerset Trojans	2–0	Dandy Town
1991	Boulevard Blazers	1–1 (2–0 replay)	Pembroke Hamilton Club
1992	Pembroke Hamilton Club	2–1	Dandy Town Hornets
1993	Boulevard Blazers	4–1	Devonshire Colts
1994	Vasco da Gama FC	2–1	Dandy Town
1995	Vasco da Gama FC	2–0	Devonshire Cougars
1996	Boulevard Blazers	2–1	Southampton Rangers
1997	Boulevard Blazers	3–2 (aet)	Wolves
1998	Vasco da Gama	2–1 (aet)	Devonshire Colts
1999	Devonshire Colts	1–0	Dandy Town Hornets
2000	North Village	2–1 (aet)	Devonshire Colts
2001	Devonshire Colts	3–1	North Village
2002	North Village	3–0	Dandy Town Hornets
2003	North Village	5–1	Prospect
2004	North Village	3–3 (2–1 replay)	Devonshire Cougars
2005	North Village	2–0	Hamilton Parish
2006	North Village	2–0 (aet)	Boulevard Blazers
2007	Devonshire Colts	2–0	Boulevard Blazers
2008	PHC Zebras	2–0	Dandy Town Hornets
2009	Boulevard Blazers	5–3	Dandy Town Hornets
2010	Devonshire Cougars	2–2 (aet, 5–3 pen)	Somerset Eagles
2011	Devonshire Cougars	4–1	Southampton Rangers
2012	Dandy Town Hornets	5–2	North Village
2013	Devonshire Cougars	3–0	Somerset Eagles
2014	Dandy Town Hornets	1–0	North Village
2015	Dandy Town Hornets	3–1	Flanagan's Onions
2016	Robin Hood	2–0	Dandy Town Hornets
2017	PHC Zebras	1–0 (aet)	North Village
2018	Robin Hood	1–0	Southampton Rangers
2019	Robin Hood	3–2	X-Roads Warriors
2020–21	Competition abandoned		
2022	Dandy Town Hornets	3–2	PHC Zebras
2023	North Village	2–1	PHC Zebras
2024	St. George's Colts	4–0	North Village
2024-25	North Village	2–0	Devonshire Cougars
2025-26	North Village	1–1 (5-4 pen)	Devonshire Colts
