= Keishon Bean =

Bermudian footballer (born 2000)

Personal information
- Full name: Keishon Bean
- Date of birth: 19 February 2000 (age 26)
- Position: Midfielder

Team information
- Current team: PHC Zebras

Senior career*
| Years | Team | Apps | (Gls) |
| 2016– | PHC Zebras | | |

International career^{‡}
| 2017– | Bermuda | 8 | (0) |
- * Club domestic league appearances and goals as of 01:11, 26 February 2022 (UTC) ‡ National team caps and goals as of 01:11, 26 February 2022 (UTC)

Keishon Bean (born 19 February 2000) is a Bermudian international footballer who plays for Pembroke Hamilton Club, as a midfielder.

== Career ==
Bean is currently playing football for Pembroke Hamilton Club.

He made his international debut for Bermuda in 2017.
