= Ralph Bean (footballer) =

Bermudian footballer

Personal information
- Full name: Ralph Eugene Bean jr.
- Date of birth: 20 May 1980 (age 46)
- Place of birth: Bermuda
- Position: Midfielder

Team information
- Current team: North Village Rams

Youth career
- 2000–2002: William & Mary Tribe

Senior career*
Years	Team	Apps	(Gls)
2003–2007	North Village Rams		
2007–2008	Bermuda Hogges	30	(1)
2008–2014	North Village Rams		

International career^{‡}
2003–2008	Bermuda	14	(3)

Managerial career
- 2013–2015: North Village Rams
- * Club domestic league appearances and goals as of 22 December 2010 ‡ National team caps and goals as of 22 December 2010

Ralph Bean (born 20 May 1980) is a retired Bermudian international footballer who most recently coached local side North Village Rams.

== Club career ==
Bean played college soccer in the United States with William & Mary Tribe and played for Bermudian side North Village Rams before joining Bermuda Hogges in 2007. He returned to North Village after deciding not to renew his contract.

== International career ==
Bean made his debut for Bermuda in a December 2003 friendly match against Barbados and earned a total of 14 caps, scoring 3 goals. He has represented his country in 5 FIFA World Cup qualification matches.

His final international match was a June 2008 World Cup qualification match against Trinidad and Tobago.

=== International goals ===
Scores and results list Bermuda's goal tally first.

N.	Date	Venue	Opponent	Score	Result	Competition
1.	29 February 2004	National Stadium, Hamilton, Bermuda	Montserrat	5–0	13–0	2006 FIFA World Cup qualification
2.	29 February 2004	National Stadium, Hamilton, Bermuda	Montserrat	8–0	13–0	2006 FIFA World Cup qualification
3.	21 March 2004	Blakes Estate Stadium, Look Out, Montserrat	Montserrat	3–0	7–0	2006 FIFA World Cup qualification

== Managerial career ==
Bean was named coach of North Village Rams in January 2013, replacing Shaun Goater. He resigned in April 2015.

== Honours ==
=== Player ===
North Village Rams

- Bermudian Premier Division: 2005–06, 2010–11
- Bermuda FA Cup: 2003–04, 2004–05, 2005–06
