= Zeiko Harris =

Bermudan footballer

Personal information
- Full name: Tahzeiko Soloman Harris
- Date of birth: 7 May 1999 (age 27)
- Place of birth: Sandys Parish, Bermuda
- Height: 1.93 m (6 ft 4 in)
- Position: Defender

Team information
- Current team: Louisville Cardinals
- Number: 12

Youth career
- CFC United

College career
Years	Team	Apps	(Gls)
2017–2019	Appalachian State Mountaineers	39	(3)
2020–2021	Louisville Cardinals	5	(0)

Senior career*
Years	Team	Apps	(Gls)
2016–2017	Somerset Trojans		
2018	Black Rock	10	(1)

International career^{‡}
2017	Bermuda U20	1	(0)
2020–	Bermuda	3	(0)
- * Club domestic league appearances and goals as of 15:44, 31 December 2021 (UTC) ‡ National team caps and goals as of 15:44, 31 December 2021 (UTC)

Tahzeiko Soloman "Zeiko" Harris (born 7 May 1999) is a Bermudan footballer who plays as a defender for the Louisville Cardinals.

== Career statistics ==
=== Club ===
As of 31 December 2021.

Club	Season	League			Cup		Continental		Other		Total	
Club	Season	Division	Apps	Goals	Apps	Goals	Apps	Goals	Apps	Goals	Apps	Goals
Black Rock	2018	PDL	10	1	0	0	–		0	0	10	1
Career total			10	1	0	0	0	0	0	0	10	1

=== International ===
As of matches played 31 December 2021.

National team	Year	Apps	Goals
Bermuda	2020	1	0
Bermuda	2021	2	0
Total		3	0
