= Angelo Simmons =

Bermudian footballer (born 1987)

Personal information
- Date of birth: 20 July 1987 (age 39)
- Place of birth: Bermuda
- Position: Forward

Team information
- Current team: Dandy Town Hornets

Senior career*
Years	Team	Apps	(Gls)
2004–2010	Boulevard Blazers		(39)
2010–2012	Bermuda Hogges	19	(2)
2011	→ Dandy Town Hornets (loan)	3	(1)
2011	Carshalton Athletic	0	(0)
2011–2012	→ Dandy Town Hornets (loan)	12	(11)
2012–	Dandy Town Hornets	79	(56)

International career^{‡}
- Bermuda U17
- Bermuda U20
2011–	Bermuda	7	(1)
Medal record
Men's football
Representing Bermuda
Island Games
Winner	2013 Bermudas
- * Club domestic league appearances and goals as of 14 November 2011 ‡ National team caps and goals as of 30 January 2016

Angelo Simmons (born 20 July 1987) is a Bermudian footballer who plays as a forward for Dandy Town Hornets.

== Club career ==
Simmons began his career as a striker with Boulevard Blazers before joining the Bermuda Hogges in the USL Second Division. He returned to the local league to play for Dandy Town Hornets and also had a short spell in England with non-league Carshalton Athletic. As of October 2022, he was still with Dandy Town and captaining the team.

== International career ==
Simmons made his debut for Bermuda in a September 2011 World Cup qualification against Guyana and has, as of November 2015, earned a total of seven caps, scoring one goal. He has represented his country in six FIFA World Cup qualification matches.

== Career statistics ==
Scores and results list goal tally first.
Scores and results list Bermuda's goal tally first, score column indicates score after each Simmons goal.

List of international goals scored by Angelo Simmons
No.	Date	Venue	Opponent	Score	Result	Competition	Ref.
1	5 June 2015	National Stadium, Hamilton, Bermuda	Puerto Rico	1–0	1–1	Friendly	

== Honours ==
Bermuda

- Island Games: 2013
