= Gary Darrell =

Bermudian footballer and manager

Personal information
- Full name: Gary Owen Darrell
- Date of birth: 10 January 1947 (age 79)
- Place of birth: Hamilton, Bermuda
- Positions: Defender; midfielder

Senior career*
| Years | Team | Apps | (Gls) |
| 1963–1967 | Wellington Rovers | | |
| 1967–1972 | Devonshire Colts | | |
| 1972–1973 | Montreal Olympique | 23 | (4) |
| 1974–1980 | Washington Diplomats | 117 | (21) |

International career
| 1967–1973 | Bermuda | | |

Managerial career
- 1992: Bermuda
- 2010–2012: Bermuda Hogges (assistant)
- 2012: Bermuda U20
- * Club domestic league appearances and goals

Gary Owen Darrell (born 10 January 1947) is a Bermudian retired association football player and manager who played in the North American Soccer League.

== Club career ==
Darrell began his professional career in Bermuda where he played for the Wellington Rovers and Devonshire Colts. In 1972, he signed with the Montreal Olympique of the North American Soccer League. In 1974, he moved to the Washington Diplomats where he played along Johan Cruyff among others and totaled seven seasons including some indoor.

== International career ==
Darrell also played international football for Bermuda and managed the Bermuda national teams after his retirement as a player.
