= Bermuda First Division =

- Founded: 1963
- Country: Bermuda
- Confederation: Bermuda Football Association
- Divisions: 2
- Number of clubs: 9 (in 2019/2020)
- Level on pyramid: 2
- Promotion to: Bermudian Premier Division
- Domestic cup: Bermuda FA Cup
- International cup: CONCACAF Caribbean Club Shield
- Current champions: Devonshire Colts and Saint George's Colts F.C.' (2019–20)
- Website: bermudafa.com/first-division

The Bermuda First Division is the second level of professional football in Bermuda.

The competition had nine participants in the 2019/2020 season.

Due to the COVID-19 pandemic, as happened in the first division, the last round of the competition was cancelled. The 0–0 score was recorded in all games in the round.

The title of champion of the 2019–20 season was shared between the Devonshire Colts F.C. and Saint George's Colts F.C. teams, who finished the competition with the same score and goal difference. The two teams also gained access to the Bermudian Premier Division.

== Current teams ==
2019–20 Season

- Clube Vasco da Gama Bermuda
- Devonshire Colts F.C.
- Flanagan's Onions F.C.
- Hamilton Parish F.C.
- Ireland Rangers FC
- Saint David's Warriors FC
- Saint George's Colts F.C.
- Wolves Sports Club
- YMSC Bluebirds FC
