= Quadir Maynard =

Bermudian footballer (born 1993)

Personal information
- Full name: Quadir Maynard
- Date of birth: May 30, 1993 (age 33)
- Place of birth: Bermuda
- Position: Midfielder

Team information
- Current team: North Village Rams

Youth career
- Boulevard Blazers
- Bromley

Senior career*
Years	Team	Apps	(Gls)
2010	Bermuda Hogges	6	(0)
2011–2012	Bromley	1	(0)
2012–2013	Robin Hood		
2013–	North Village Rams		

International career^{‡}
- Bermuda U20
2011–	Bermuda	3	(0)
- * Club domestic league appearances and goals ‡ National team caps and goals as of 21:48, 20 April 2012 (UTC)

Quadir Maynard (born 30 May 1993) is a Bermudian footballer who plays for North Village Rams.

== Club career ==
Maunard began his career as a striker with Boulevard Blazers, before joining the Bermuda Hogges in the USL Second Division.

He moved to Bromley on a two-year development contract, earning a playing contract with the club in November 2011 until the end of the season. In November 2012, Maynard made his debut for Robin Hood and joined North Village Rams a year later.

== International career ==
Maynard made his debut for Bermuda in a September 2011 FIFA World Cup qualification match against Guyana and has, as of November 2015, earned a total of three caps, scoring no goals. He has represented his country in three FIFA World Cup qualification matches.
