= Somerset Eagles R.C. =

Association football club in Bermuda

Somerset Eagles
- Full name: Somerset Bridge Recreation Club
- Ground: White Hill Field; Sandys, Bermuda
- Chairman: Marc Bean
- League: Bermudian First Division
- 2025–26: 3rd
Home colours

Somerset Eagles is a football club from Sandys, Bermuda. They play in the Bermudian First Division.

== History ==
Eagles have never won the league title and were on the losing side in the Bermuda FA Cup final twice, in 2010 and 2013. In March 2016 they won the Bermudian First Division title to win promotion to the Bermudian Premier Division. They had been in the second tier since their relegation in March 2011.

== Historical list of coaches ==
- (Bermuda) Kenny Thompson (- Jul 2010)
- (Trinidad and Tobago) Marlon Rojas (Aug 2010–?)
