= Mark Mills =

Mark Mills may refer to:

- Mark Muir Mills (1917–1958), American nuclear physicist
- Mark Mills (writer), British novelist
- Mark Mills (architect) (1921–2007), American experimental architect
