= X-Roads Warriors F.C. =

Association football club in Bermuda

X-Roads Warriors
- Full name: Crossroads Warriors Football Club
- Nickname: Warriors
- League: Bermudian First Division
- 2025–26: 6th
- Website: http://www.xroadswarriors.com/

The X-Roads Warriors Football Club (pronounced Crossroads Warriors) is a Bermudian football club based in Smith's Parish. The club presently competes in the Bermudian Premier Division, the top tier of football in Bermuda.
