= Clube Vasco da Gama Bermuda =

Association football club in Bermuda

Vasco da Gama Club
- Full name: Vasco da Gama Club
- Founded: 1935; 91 years ago
- League: First Division
- 2025–26: 7th
- Website: vascobermuda.org

Vasco da Gama Club is a private members' community club based in Bermuda. It currently forms part of the Bermuda Football Association, competing in its First Division League, the second tier of Bermuda football. The team has historically had Portuguese players, but more recently has seen many English and Bermudian players on the club.

Vasco da Gama Club is one of the most successful Bermudian Teams in history, having lifted the Premier League title three times (most recently in 1999) and the Bermuda FA Cup four times (most recently in 1998). They play games at the North Village Community Club in Pembroke, Bermuda, and their Club Headquarters are on Reid Street in Hamilton, Bermuda.

== History ==
In the 1970s, a group of Portuguese immigrants coming from Azores started to reunite on the club to organize festivals to celebrate the Portuguese culture on Hawkins Island. In 1978 they decided to create a football program with a professional team playing on Bermuda Football Union and a youth team.
