= St. George's Colts =

Association football club in Bermuda

- Full name: St. George's Cricket Club/St. George's Colts
- Founded: 1892
- Stadium: Wellington Oval Field
- League: Bermudian Premier Division
- 2025–26: Bermudian Premier Division, 7th of 10

The St. George's Colts is a professional football club based in St. George's, Bermuda. The club presently competes in the Bermudian Premier Division, the top tier of football in Bermuda.

They were promoted to the top division in 2020, earning promotion from the Bermuda First Division.
