= Bermuda Football Association =

Football (soccer) organization in Bermuda

CONCACAF
- Founded: 1928; 98 years ago
- FIFA affiliation: 1962
- CONCACAF affiliation: 1967
- President: Mark Wade
- Website: bermudafa.com

The Bermuda Football Association, founded in 1928, is the official football organization in Bermuda and is in charge of the Bermudian national team. The league is also in charge of the sporting leagues on the island.

== Association staff ==
| Name | Position | Source |
|---|---|---|
| (Bermuda) Mark Wade | President | |
| (Bermuda) Crenstant Williams | Senior Vice-president | |
| (Bermuda) David Sabir | General secretary | |
| (Bermuda) Raymond Jones | Treasurer | |
| (Bermuda) Maurice Lowe | Technical director | |
| (Canada) Michael Findlay | Team coach (men's) | |
| (Bermuda) Naquita Robinson | Team coach (women's) | |
| (Bermuda) Aminah Simmons | Media/communications manager | |
| n/a | Futsal Coordinator | |
| n/a | Chairperson of the Referees Committee | |
| (Bermuda) Crenstant Williams | Head/Director of the Referees Department | |
| (Bermuda) Crenstant Williams | Referee coordinator | |

== Leagues ==
=== Men ===
- Bermudian Premier Division
- First Division
- Corona League

=== Women ===
- Women's League

=== Youth ===
- Appleby Youth League

== See also ==
- List of football clubs in Bermuda
