= Bermudian Premier Division =

Association football league in Bermuda

- Founded: 1963
- Country: Bermuda
- Confederation: Bermuda Football Association
- Number of clubs: 10
- Level on pyramid: 1
- Relegation to: Bermuda First Division
- Domestic cup: Bermuda FA Cup
- International cup: CONCACAF Caribbean Club Shield
- Current champions: Dandy Town Hornets (2025–26)
- Most championships: PHC Zebras (13 titles)
- Website: bermudafa.com/premier-division
- Current: 2025–26 Bermudian Premier Division

The Bermudian Premier Division (officially the Digicel Premier Division for sponsorship reasons) is the highest level of professional football in Bermuda.

Clubs compete for the national title and a spot in the CONCACAF Caribbean Club Shield. The Bermudian clubs who participated in CONCACAF Champions' Cup (the predecessor to the CONCACAF Champions League), qualified in the North American zone. The bottom two clubs at the end of each season are relegated to the First Division.

== Current clubs ==
2025–26 season

- Dandy Town Hornets (Pembroke)
- Devonshire Colts (Devonshire)
- Devonshire Cougars (Devonshire)
- X-Roads Warriors F.C.
- North Village Rams (Pembroke)
- Paget Lions (Southampton)
- PHC Zebras (Warwick)
- St. George's Colts (St George's)
- Boulevard Blazers F.C.
- Young Men's Social Club (Devonshire)

== Champions ==
Ed.	Season	Champion
1	1963–64	Young Men's Social Club
2	1964–65	Young Men's Social Club
3	1965–66	Young Men's Social Club
4	1966–67	Somerset Cricket Club
5	1967–68	Somerset Cricket Club
6	1968–69	Somerset Cricket Club
7	1969–70	Somerset Cricket Club
8	1970–71	PHC Zebras
9	1971–72	Devonshire Colts
10	1972–73	Devonshire Colts
11	1973–74	North Village Community Club
12	1974–75	Hotels International FC
13	1975–76	North Village Community Club
14	1976–77	PHC Zebras
15	1977–78	North Village Community Club
16	1978–79	North Village Community Club
17	1979–80	Hotels International FC
18	1980–81	Southampton Rangers
19	1981–82	Somerset Cricket Club
20	1982–83	Somerset Cricket Club
21	1983–84	Somerset Cricket Club
22	1984–85	PHC Zebras
23	1985–86	PHC Zebras
24	1986–87	Somerset Cricket Club
25	1987–88	Dandy Town
26	1988–89	PHC Zebras
27	1989–90	PHC Zebras
28	1990–91	Boulevard Community Club
29	1991–92	PHC Zebras
30	1992–93	Somerset Cricket Club
31	1993–94	Dandy Town
32	1994–95	Boulevard Community Club
33	1995–96	Vasco da Gama
34	1996–97	Devonshire Colts
35	1997–98	Vasco da Gama
36	1998–99	Vasco da Gama
37	1999–00	PHC Zebras
38	2000–01	Dandy Town Hornets
39	2001–02	North Village Community Club
40	2002–03	North Village Community Club
41	2003–04	Dandy Town Hornets
42	2004–05	Devonshire Cougars
43	2005–06	North Village Community Club
44	2006–07	Devonshire Cougars
45	2007–08	PHC Zebras
46	2008–09	Devonshire Cougars
47	2009–10	Dandy Town Hornets
48	2010–11	North Village Community Club
49	2011–12	Dandy Town Hornets
50	2012–13	Devonshire Cougars
51	2013–14	Dandy Town Hornets
52	2014–15	Somerset Trojans
53	2015–16	Dandy Town Hornets
54	2016–17	Robin Hood
55	2017–18	PHC Zebras
56	2018–19	PHC Zebras
57	2019–20	North Village Rams
58	2020–21	Season abandoned due to COVID-19 pandemic
59	2021–22	Dandy Town Hornets
60	2022–23	PHC Zebras
61	2023–24	PHC Zebras
62	2024–25	North Village Rams
63	2025–26	Dandy Town Hornets

== Performance by club ==
Club	Parish	Titles	Seasons won
PHC Zebras	Warwick	13	1970–71, 1976–77, 1984–85, 1985–86, 1988–89, 1989–90, 1991–92, 1999–00, 2007–08, 2017–18, 2018–19, 2022–23, 2023–24
Somerset Trojans (includes Somerset Cricket Club)	Somerset	10	1966–67, 1967–68, 1968–69, 1969–70, 1981–82, 1982–83, 1983–84, 1986–87, 1992–93, 2014–15
North Village Rams	Hamilton	10	1973–74, 1975–76, 1977–78, 1978–79, 2001–02, 2002–03, 2005–06, 2010–11, 2019–20, 2024–25
Dandy Town Hornets	Pembroke	10	1987–88, 1993–94, 2003–04, 2009–10, 2011–12, 2013–14, 2015–16, 2021–22, 2025–26
Devonshire Cougars	Devonshire	4	2004–05, 2006–07, 2008–09, 2012–13
Devonshire Colts	Devonshire	3	1971–72, 1972–73, 1996–97
Vasco Mariners	Pembroke	3	1995–96, 1997–98, 1998–99
Young Men's Social Club	Pembroke	3	1963–64, 1964–65, 1965–66
Boulevard Community Club	Pembroke	2	1990–91, 1994–95
Hotels International FC	Pembroke	2	1974–75, 1979–80
Robin Hood	Pembroke	1	2016–17
Southampton Rangers	Southampton	1	1980–81

== Top scorers ==
Year	Topscorer(s)	Club(s)	Goals
1963–64	(Bermuda) Glenn Wade	Dock Hill Rangers	18
1964–65	(Bermuda) Bayfield Clarke	Dock Hill Rangers	20
1967–68	(Bermuda) Clyde Best	Somerset Cricket Club	20
1972–73	(Bermuda) Alvin Dowling	Devonshire Colts	23
1973–74	(Bermuda) Marichal Astwood	PHC Zebras	15
1974–75	(Bermuda) Gary Darrell (Bermuda) Randy Horton	Devonshire Colts; Somerset Cricket Club	10
1976–77	(Bermuda) Ralph Bean (Bermuda) Michael Williams	North Village Rams; Southampton Rangers	14
1978–79	(Bermuda) Coolridge Bell	Somerset Cricket Club	35 (Note: League record)
1989–90	(Bermuda) Kyle Lightbourne	PHC Zebras	?
1990–91	(Bermuda) David Bascome	Boulevard Blazers	?
1991–92	(Bermuda) Kyle Lightbourne	PHC Zebras	24
1992–93	(Bermuda) Kenny Mills	PHC Zebras	13 (Note: Incomplete data. Other players may have exceeded Mills' total.)
1993–94	(Bermuda) Carlos Smith	Dandy Town Hornets	16
1995–96	(Bermuda) Darrin Simons	Dandy Town Hornets	17
1999–00	(Bermuda) Keith Jennings	Vasco Volcanoes	13
2000–01	(Bermuda) Raynell Lightbourne	PHC Zebras	11
2001–02	(Bermuda) Raymond Beach	Devonshire Cougars	12
2002–03	(Bermuda) Raymond Beach	Devonshire Cougars	20
2003–04	(Bermuda) Raymond Beach	Devonshire Cougars	17
2004–05	(Bermuda) Khano Smith	Dandy Town Hornets	12
2005–06	(Bermuda) Aljame Zuill	Devonshire Cougars	11
2006–07	(Bermuda) Ralph Bean Jr.	North Village Rams	14
2007–08	(Bermuda) Kwame Steede	Devonshire Cougars	15
2008–09	(Bermuda) Raymond Beach	Dandy Town Hornets	16
2009–10	(Bermuda) Nahki Wells	Dandy Town Hornets	20
2010–11	(Bermuda) Raymond Beach (Bermuda) Kwame Steede	Dandy Town; Devonshire Cougars	13
2011–12	(Bermuda) Antwan Russell	PHC Zebras	19
2012–13	(Bermuda) Dennis Russell	Southampton Rangers	16
2013–14	(Bermuda) Keston Lewis	Flanagan's Onions	15
2014–15	(Bermuda) Keston Lewis (Bermuda) Antwan Russell	Flanagan's Onions; Robin Hood	12
2015–16	(Bermuda) Angelo Simmons	Dandy Town Hornets	15
2016–17	(Bermuda) Ian Coke (Bermuda) Angelo Simmons	Boulevard Blazers; Dandy Town Hornets	15
2017–18	(Bermuda) Antwan Russell	Robin Hood	21
2018–19	(Bermuda) Angelo Simmons	Dandy Town Hornets	23
2019–20	(Bermuda) Donavan Thompson	X-Road Warriors	13

== Multiple hat-tricks ==
Rank	Country	Player	Hat-tricks
1	(Bermuda)	Raymond Beach	3
1	(Bermuda)	Ralph Bean Jr.	3
3	(Bermuda)	Kieshen Bean	2
3	(Bermuda)	Antwan Russell	2
3	(Bermuda)	Kwame Steede	2
3	(Bermuda)	Nahki Wells	2
7	(Bermuda)	Drewonde Bascome	1
7	(Bermuda)	Jonathan Bean	1
7	(Bermuda)	Raymond Burgees	1
7	(Bermuda)	Domico Coddington	1
7	(Bermuda)	Kyle Jones	1
7	(Bermuda)	Jason Lee	1
7	(Bermuda)	Dennis Russell	1
7	(Bermuda)	Angelo Simmons	1
7	(Bermuda)	Jamie Smith	1
7	(Bermuda)	Dion Stovell	1
7	(Bermuda)	Janeiro Tucker	1
7	(Bermuda)	Korvon Tucker	1
7	(Bermuda)	Heys Wolfe	1
