= Somerset Village, Bermuda =

Somerset
- Village
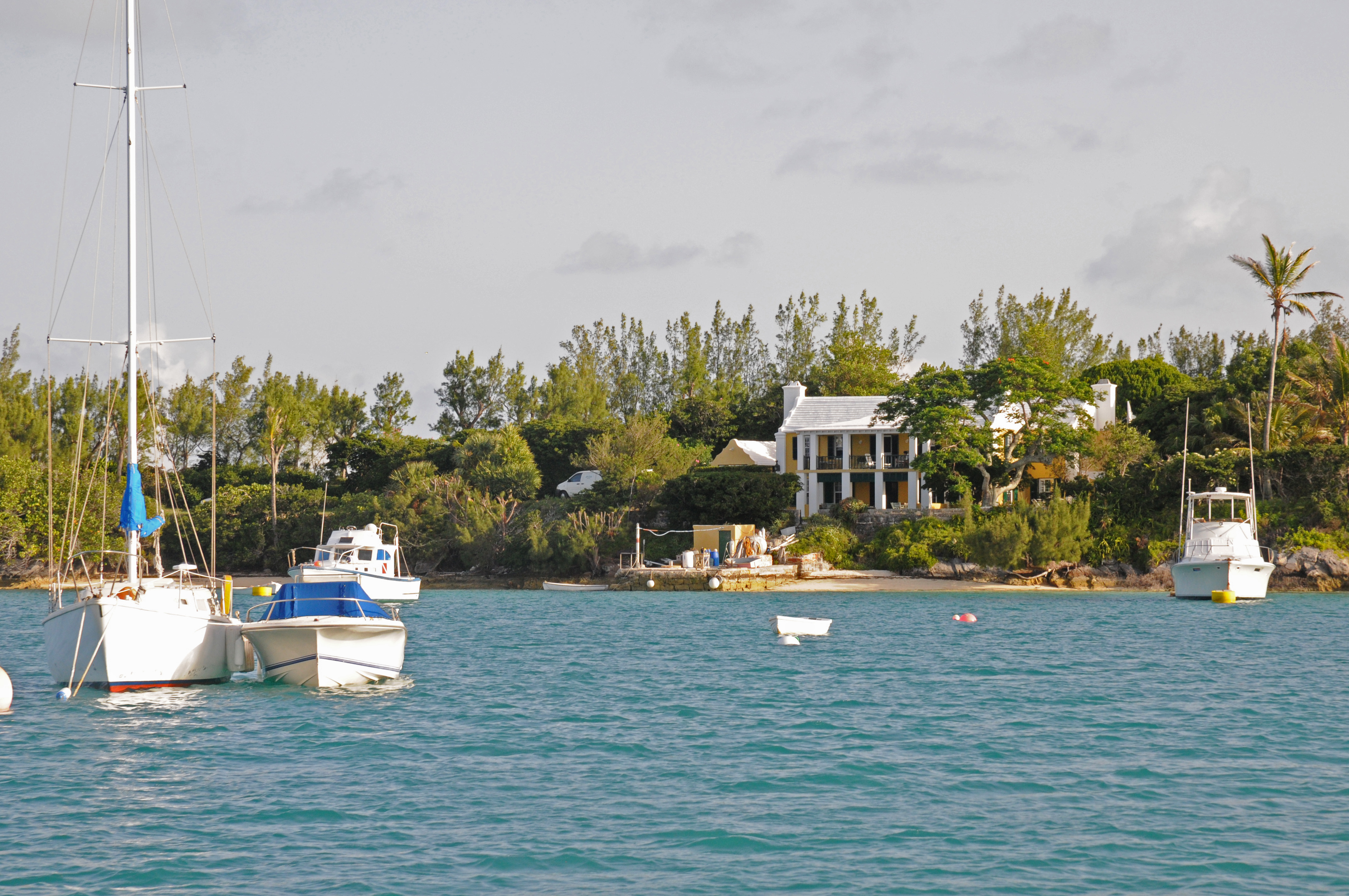

- Location within Bermuda
- Coordinates: 32°18′00″N 64°52′00″W
- Country: Bermuda
- Parish: Sandys

Population
  - Total: 1,000
- Time zone: UTC-4 (AST)
- Climate: Cfa

Somerset is a small, unincorporated village in the northwest area of Bermuda, located in Sandys Parish. It lies in the northern half of Somerset Island.

Like Flatts and Tucker's Town, the settlement has existed for centuries, though a lack of formal borders and municipal government means its foundation is undated, and when, precisely, the area came to be commonly thought of as a village is not clear.

The village centres on the southern shore of Mangrove Bay, and was once a useful, if minor port. Today, the area includes a bank, a police station, post office, ferry station (on the Great Sound, beside Watford Bridge), library, a number of shops, small hotels, pubs and restaurants, and a boat club. There is also a bus depot as the village is the terminus of a number of bus routes. There is a small beach at the west of the village, and another at nearby (Somerset) Long Bay (there are two other Long Bays in Bermuda) is within walking distance.

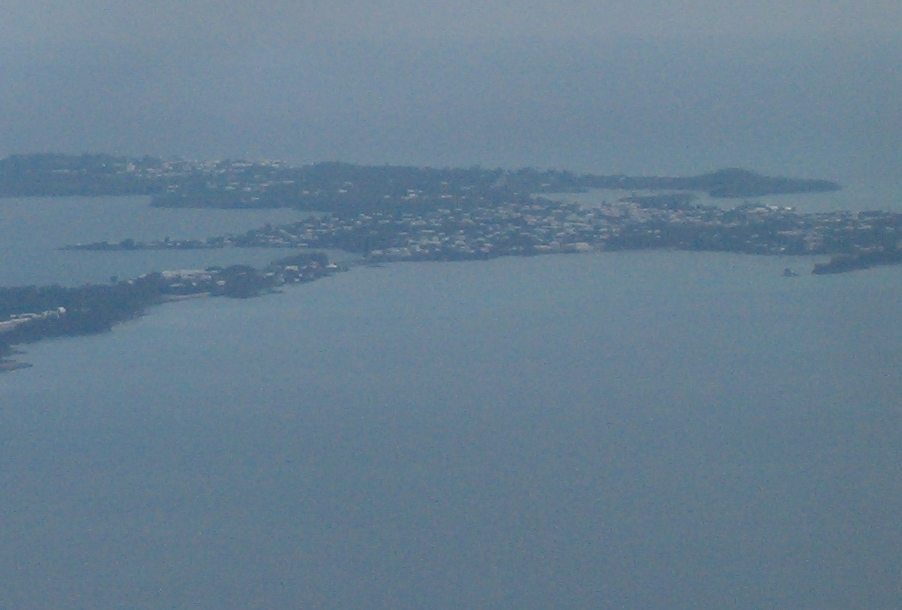
Mangrove Bay and Somerset Village, seen from the air

The village is conveniently near to the defunct Royal Naval Dockyard on Ireland Island (part of a former naval base that began on the opposite end of Watford Bridge), and is connected to the City of Hamilton, as well as the Dockyard, by regular ferries. The village is the site, each summer, of the Non-Mariners' Race, a humorous non-race by deliberately unseaworthy floats.

== Sports ==
Somerset Cricket Club and its football team Somerset Trojans play at the Somerset Cricket Club Field.

== Notable people ==
- Clyde Best MBE (born 1951 in Somerset) is a Bermudian former football player. He was one of the first black players in First Division football in England, scoring 47 goals as a striker for West Ham United.
