= Devonshire Colts F.C. =

Association football club in Bermuda

Devonshire Colts Football Club
- Nickname: The Colts
- Founded: 1958; 68 years ago
- Ground: Police Recreation Field; Devonshire, Bermuda
- Head coach: Jay Bean
- League: Bermudian Premier Division
- 2025–2026: Bermudian Premier Division, 2nd of 10
Home colours	Away colours

Devonshire Colts FC is a professional football club based in Devonshire Parish, Bermuda, playing in the Bermudian Premier Division. The team colours are orange and black .

== History ==
The Devonshire Colts Football Club was established in 1958, due to the efforts of Edward DeJean and Braxton Burgess. These men were members of the Howard Academy, aka Skinners School, in Bermuda. DeJean was the principal while Burgess was the physical education teacher.

Following their school level successes, the Howard Academy team moved on to participating in practice matches with local men's football teams which subsequently led to the application and entry into the Bermuda Football Union.

Colts were relegated to the Bermuda First Division in 2011, they returned to the Bermudian Premier Division after 4 years in for the 2015/16 season after beating St David's in March 2015.

Colts were once again relegated to the Bermuda First Division in 2017, but this time with the fewest points(4) total in the history of the Bermuda Premier Division

== Rivalries ==
Devonshire Colts main rivalries are Devonshire Cougars and St. Georges Colts. Devonshire Colts fans consider B.A.A as a distant rivalry as they are not located close to each other. Additionally, a strong rivalry with Devonshire Cougars dates back to when both clubs were founded with "Devonshire' in their name. More recently a rivalry with B.A.A has grown following repeated clashes in competitions.

== Achievements ==
- Cingular Wireless Premier Division: 3

1971/72, 1972/73, 1996/97

- Bermuda FA Cup: 5

1972/73, 1973/74, 1998/99, 2000/01, 2006/07

- Bermuda Friendship Trophy: 4

1973/74, 1980/81, 1998/99, 1999/00

- Bermuda Martonmere Cup: 2

1972/73, 2002/03

- Bermuda Dudley Eve Trophy: 3

1978/79, 1982/83, 1999/00

- Bermuda Super Cup: 3

1996/97, 1998/99, 2006/07

- Bermuda Friendship Shield Cup: 1

2014/2015

- Relegated with fewest points(4) total in the history of the Bermuda Premier Division

2016/2017

== Performance in CONCACAF competitions ==
- CONCACAF Champions Cup – (North Zone): 1 appearance

Best: 1973 – Second Round

Year	Opponent	1st leg	2nd leg
1973	(Bermuda) North Village CC	3–1	3–4
	(Netherlands Antilles) CRKSV Jong Colombia	2–0	1–1
