= Flanagan's Onions F.C. =

Association football club in Bermuda

Flanagan's Onions FC
- Full name: Flanagan's Onions Football Club
- Ground: Bermuda Athletic Association Field; Hamilton, Bermuda
- Coach: Mick Ward
- League: Bermudian First Division
- 2015–16: 2nd (promoted)
| Home colours | Away colours |

Flanagan's Onions is an association football club from Hamilton, Bermuda. They play in the Bermudian First Division.

== History ==
Founded in 1989 as MR Onions, the club were relegated from the Bermudian Premier Division in March 2015. They bounced back on the first attempt, after clinching promotion in March 2016 with two games left. They were, however, leapfrogged by Somerset Eagles on the final day of the season to finish it in 2nd place.

== Historical list of coaches ==
- (Bermuda) Dermot O'Sullivan (-)
- (England) Micky Ward (2010–present)
