= Southampton Rangers S.C. =

Association football club in Bermuda

Southampton Rangers
- Full name: Southampton Rangers Sports Club
- Founded: 1965
- Ground: Southampton Oval, Southampton, Bermuda
- Capacity: 1,000
- Chairman: Jason Wade
- Manager: Jomar Wilkinson
- League: Bermudian First Division
- 2025–26: 4th
Home colours	Away colours

Southampton Rangers Sports Club is a Bermudian football club based in the parish of Southampton who participate in the Bermudian First Division.

They play their home games at the Southampton Oval.

== History ==
Founded in the 1950s, the club has won the league title once, in 1981. They only just avoided relegation in the 2013/14 and 2014/15 seasons but were facing the drop once more in the 2015/16 season.

== Achievements ==
- Bermudian Premier Division: 1

1980/81

- Bermuda FA Cup: 1

1983/84

== Players ==
=== Current squad ===
- For 2015–2016 season

Note: Flags indicate national team as defined under FIFA eligibility rules; some limited exceptions apply. Players may hold more than one non-FIFA nationality.

No.	Pos.	Nation	Player
—	DF	BER	Sean Perinchief
—	GK	BER	Ajai Daniels
—	DF	BER	Jahkai Hill
—	MF	BER	Nicholas Mello
—	DF	BER	Caldre Burgess
—	DF	BER	Rai Sampson
—	DF	BER	Darius Cox
—	MF	BER	Isaiah Taylor
—	MF	BER	Ricardo Lowe

No.	Pos.	Nation	Player
—	MF	BER	Quadir Maynard
—	MF	BER	Ezekiel Stoneham (Captain)
—	MF	BER	Koshun Durrant
—	MF	BER	Travis Wilkinson
—	MF	BER	Donte Brangman
—	FW	BER	Keedai Astwood
—	FW	BER	Jarazinho Bassett
—	FW	BER	Acquino Grant
—	FW	BER	Antinori Butterfield
—	DF	BER	Dominique Hill
—	MF	BER	Reggie Lowe

== Historical list of coaches ==
- (Bermuda) Albert Smith
- (Bermuda) Gerri Saltus
- (Bermuda) Keith Jennings (Jun 2010 – March 2012)
- (Bermuda) Marvin Belboda (Jul 2012 – June 2013)
- (Bermuda) Maurice Lowe (Jun 2013 – July 2015)
- (Bermuda) Keith Jennings (August 2015 – 2016)
- (Bermuda) Jomar Wilkinson (July 2017 – present)
