= Hamilton Parish F.C. =

Association football club in Bermuda

Hamilton Parish
- Full name: Hamilton Parish Workman's Club
- Ground: Wellington Oval, St. George's Island, Bermuda
Home colours	Away colours	Third colours

Hamilton Parish Football Club is a professional football club based in Hamilton Parish, Bermuda. They currently play in the Bermudian Premier Division.

== History ==
Also named Hamilton Parish Hot Peppers, the club have been in the Bermudian Premier Division since winning promotion in March 2013. They secured the First Division title a week after promotion was confirmed.
