= Pembroke Parish =

Parish of Bermuda

Coordinates: 32°17′50″N 64°46′50″W

Pembroke Parish

Pembroke Parish is one of the nine parishes of Bermuda. It is named after English aristocrat William Herbert, 3rd Earl of Pembroke (1580–1630). Located in the central part of the island chain, it is home to Hamilton, the capital city of Bermuda, which functions as the administrative, commercial, and financial hub of the territory. This central location and the presence of the capital make Pembroke Parish a densely populated and economically vital area.

The economy of Bermuda is predominantly driven by international business, particularly reinsurance and financial services, which are largely concentrated in Hamilton. Tourism also plays a role, with various accommodations and attractions within the parish. Its geography is characterized by intricate coastlines and natural harbors, which have historically been crucial for maritime activities and continue to support its modern functions as a port and commercial center.

== History ==
Bermuda was settled by the English in the early 17th century when the Virginia Company brought slaves and shipwrecked people to the island. The island was subsequently colonized and divided into parishes, named after investors of the Somers Isles Company. Pembroke Parish is one of Bermuda's original nine parishes, established early in the island's colonial history, and was named after William Herbert, 3rd Earl of Pembroke (1580–1630). The parish grew in importance with the establishment of Hamiton as the capital city in 1815.

== Geography ==
Pembroke Parish is located in the central part of the main island of Bermuda. It is bordered by Devonshire Parish to the east. The parish covers an area of approximately 2.1 sq mi (5.4 km^{2}) and has a coastline along the North Shore and Hamilton Harbour. The topography of the country is generally undulating, characterized by low cliffs and beaches. The limestone cliffs, which has been shaped by wind and water over millennia, create a rugged coastline with numerous small caves.

== Demographics ==
Pembroke Parish is the most densely populated parish in Bermuda, largely due to being home to the capital city, Hamilton. As of the 2016 Census, the population of Pembroke Parish was 11,160 people. The economy of Pembroke Parish is strongly influenced by the presence of Hamilton, the capital city, which is the hub of Bermuda's international business sector. International business, particularly reinsurance and financial services, is the largest contributor to Bermuda's GDP. Tourism plays an important role in the economy, with various hotels, guesthouses, and tourist attractions in the region. The port facilities in Hamilton Harbour facilitates trade and anchoring for cruise ships, and local ferries.

== Education ==
Public schools in the parish include:

- Northlands Primary School
- Victor Scott Primary School and Victor Scott Preschool
- West Pembroke Primary School
- Dellwood Middle School
- The Berkeley Institute, a senior school

== Gallery ==
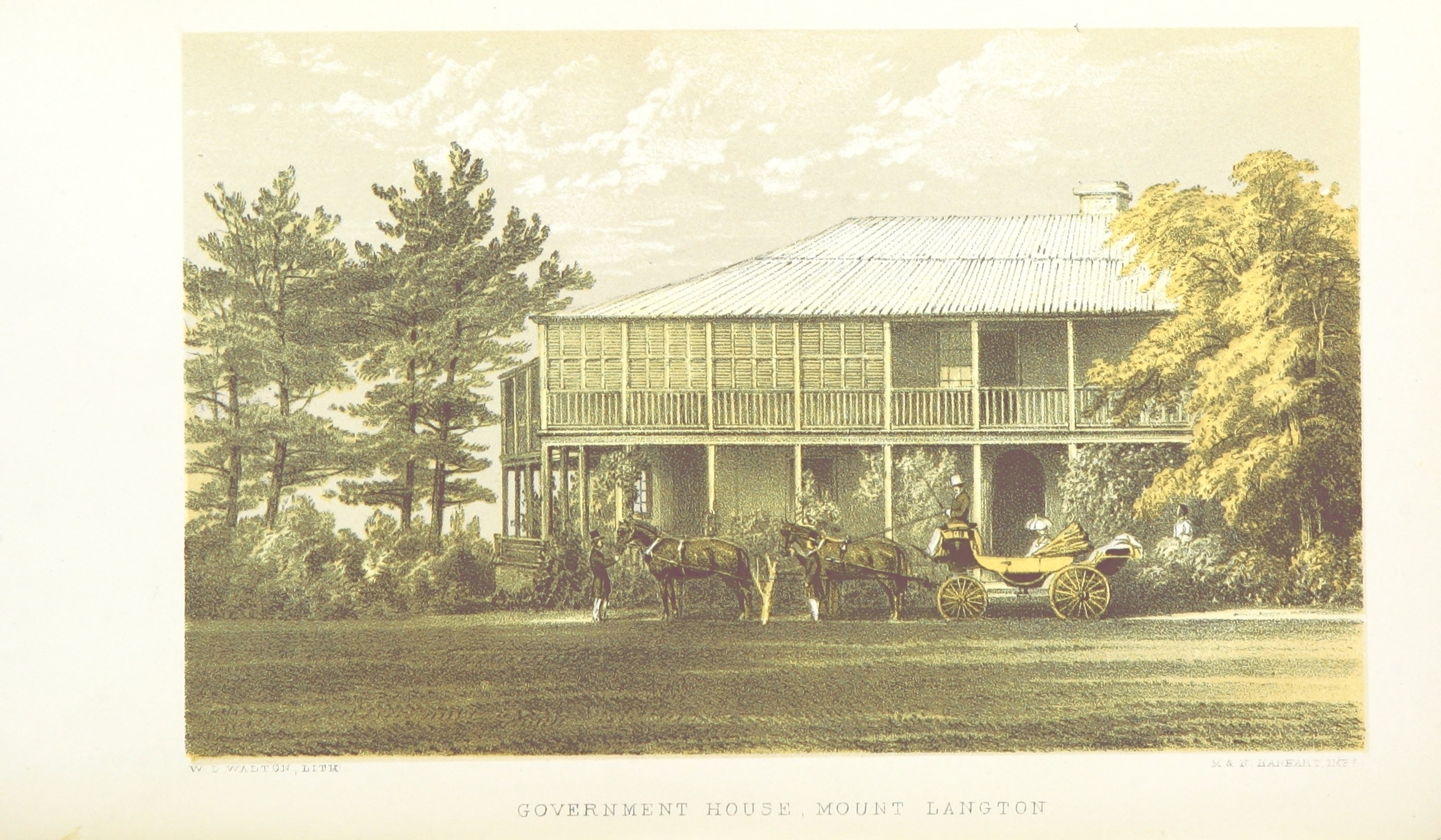
Mount Langton, the Government House of Bermuda from 1814 (when it moved from St. George's) to 1892, in 1857

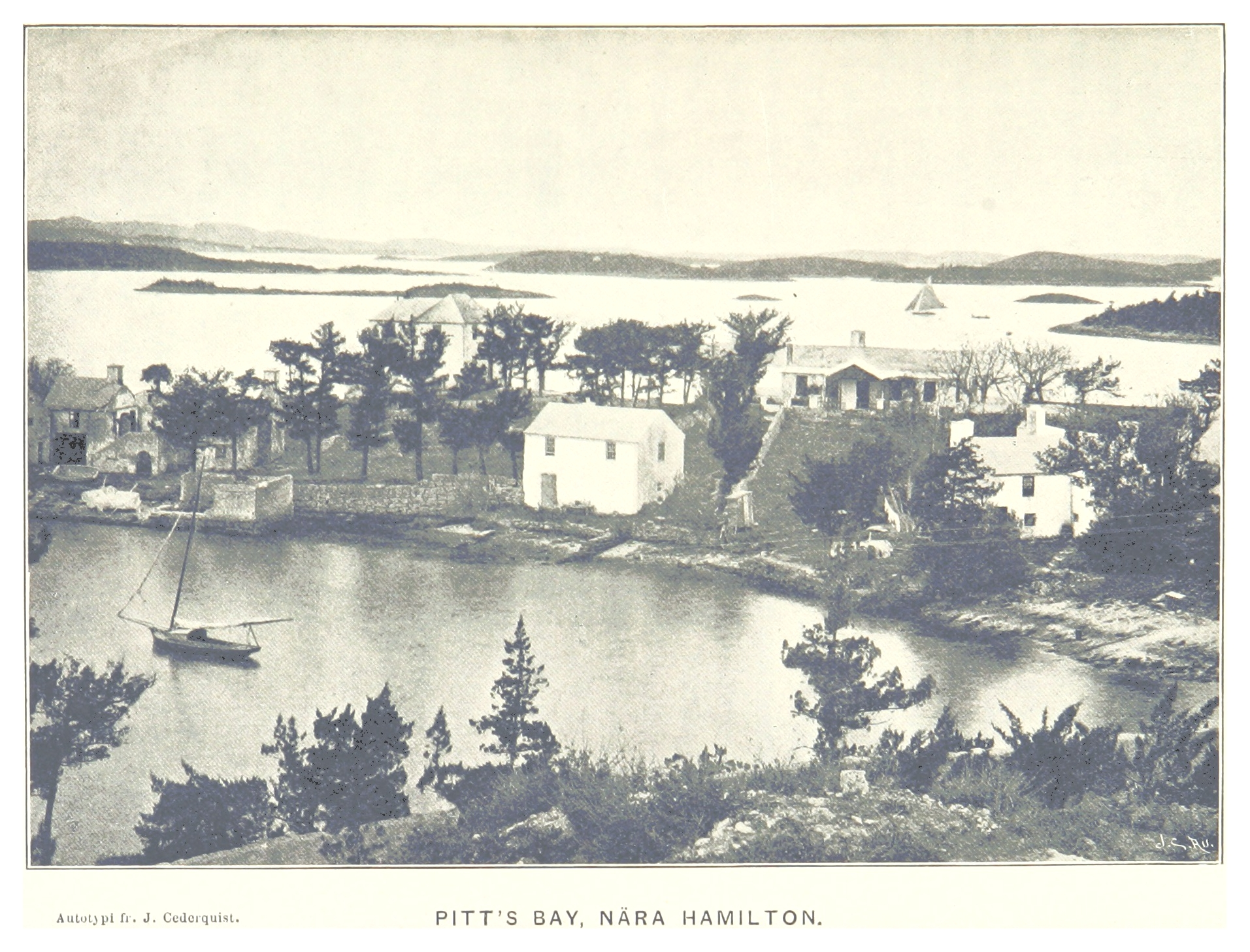
Pitt's Bay, 1895

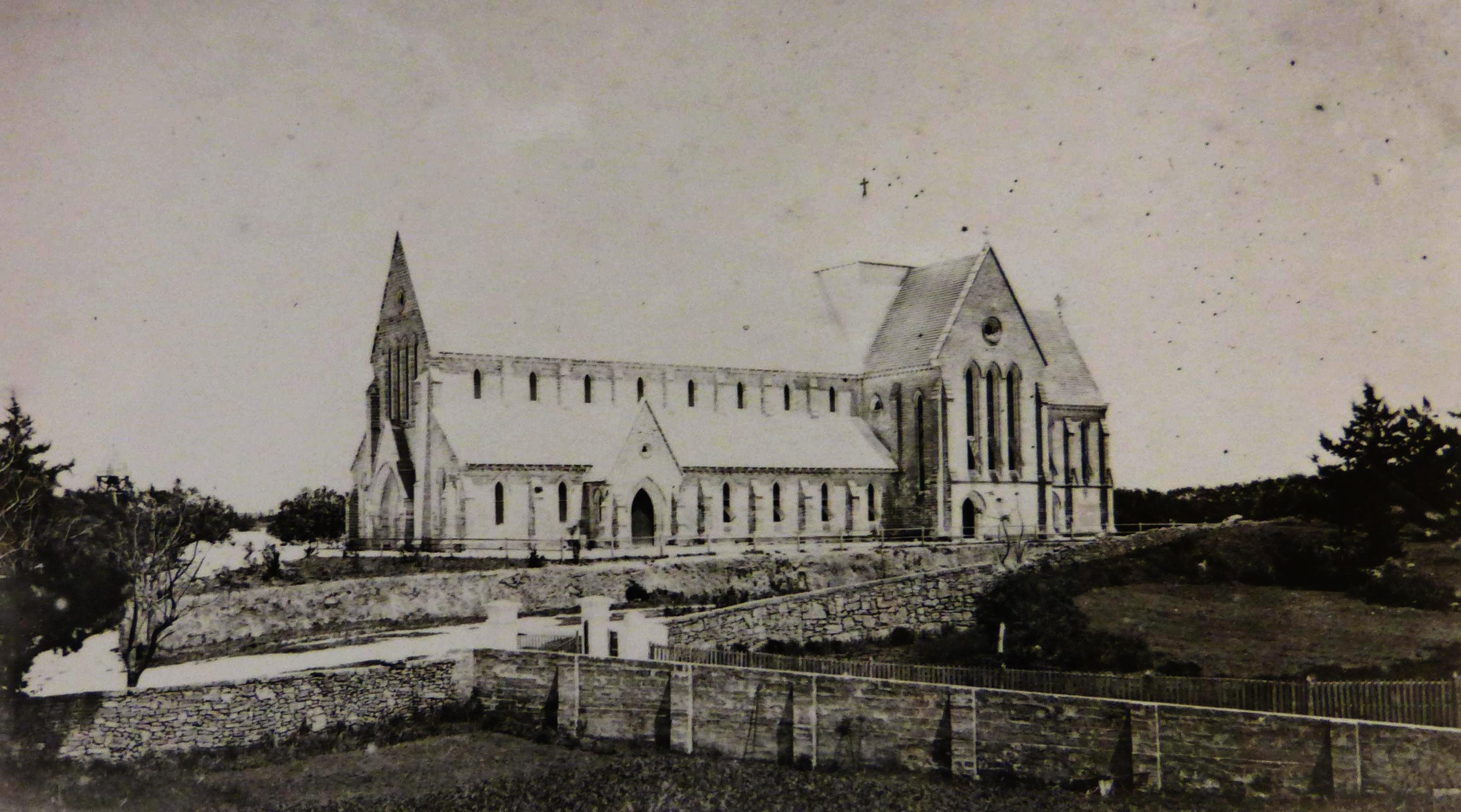
The original Trinity Church chapel-of-ease in 1879

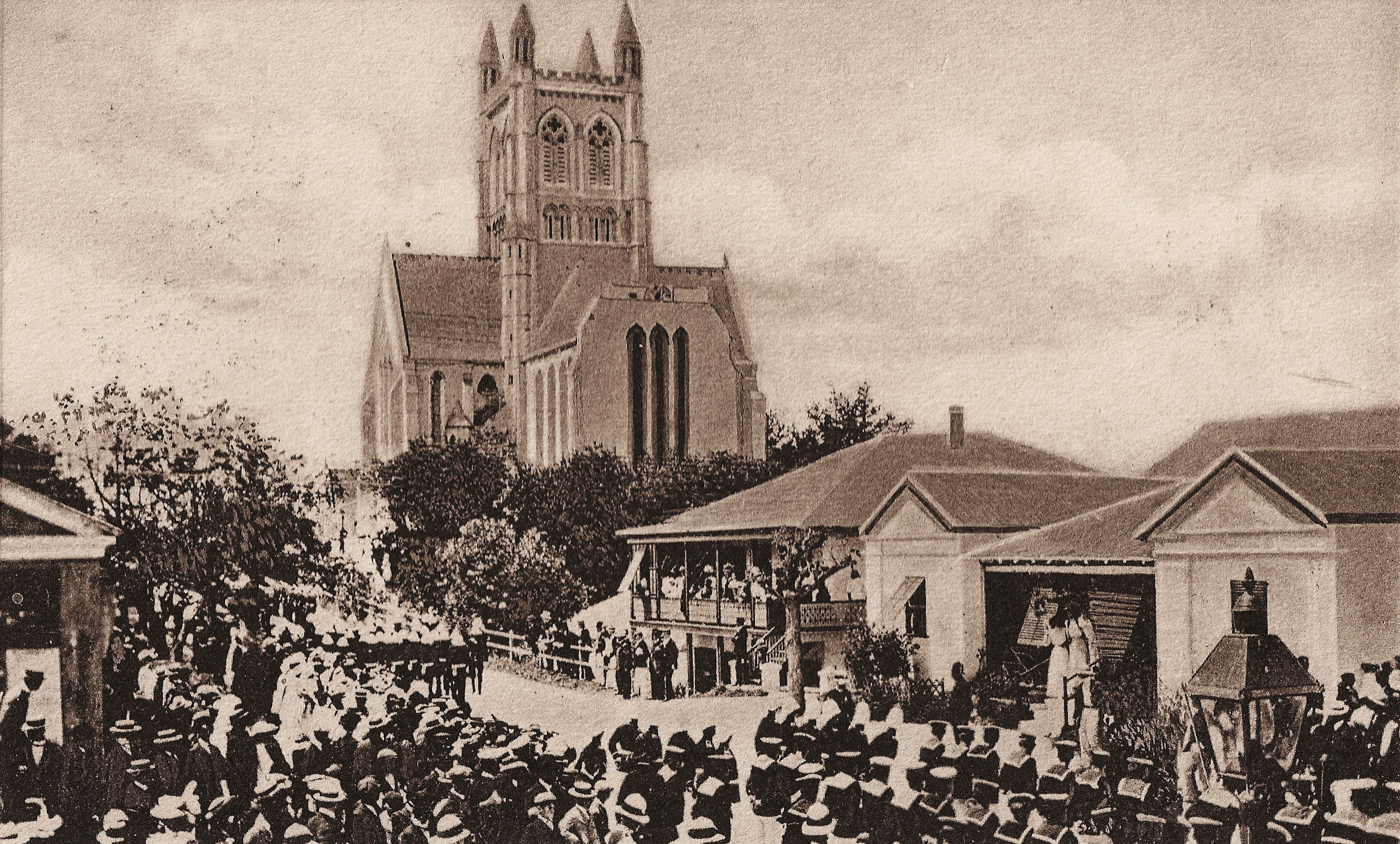
A Church Parade by the Royal Navy and British Army in front of the incomplete cathedral, circa 1900

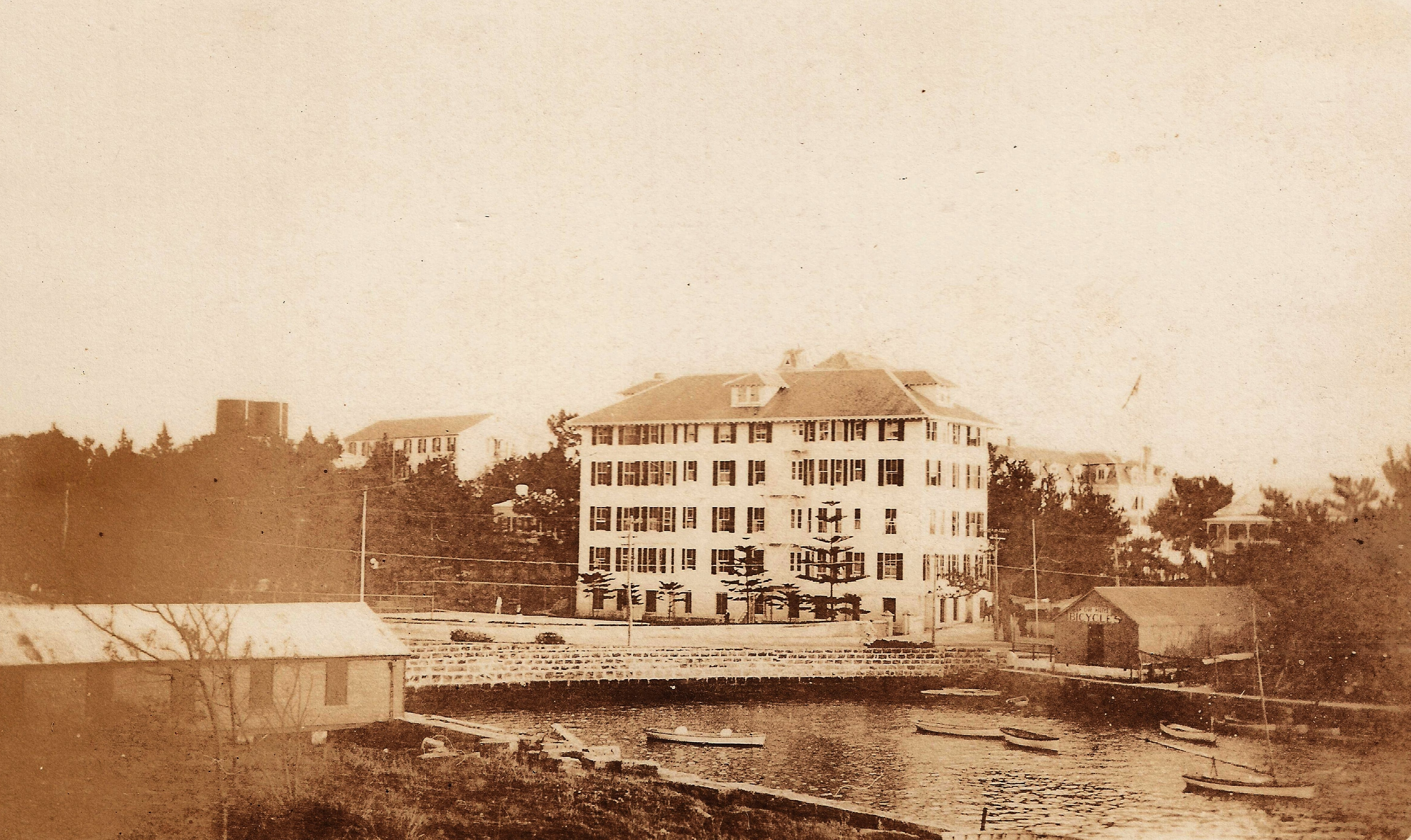
The Princess Hotel, seen from the landward side, circa 1900
