= Somerset Trojans =

Association football club in Bermuda

- Full name: Somerset Cricket Club Trojans
- Nickname: Trojans
- Founded: 1964; 62 years ago
- Ground: Somerset Cricket Club Field; Somerset, Bermuda
- Capacity: 1,000
- coach: Danvers Seymour Jr.
- League: Bermudian Premier Division
- 2025–26: Winners, First Division (promoted)
Home colours	Away colours

Somerset Cricket Club Trojans is a Bermudian football club based in Somerset that competes in the Bermudian Premier Division.

== History ==
Trojans were formed in 1964 after a merger between West End Rovers and 2nd division Somerset Colts. Rovers were founded as West End SC in the 1930s. They are Bermuda's most successful team, winning the league a record 10 times.

In April 2015, Trojans won their first league title in 22 years and their tenth in total after beating Southampton Rangers 3–0.

== Achievements ==
- Bermudian Premier Division: 10

1966–67, 1967–68, 1968–69, 1969–70, 1981–82, 1982–83, 1983–84, 1986–87, 1992–93, 2014–15

- Bermuda FA Cup: 9

1967–68, 1968–69, 1969–70, 1971–72, 1975–76, 1976–77, 1978–79, 1987–88, 1989–90

== Players ==
=== Current squad ===
- For 2015–2016 season

Note: Flags indicate national team as defined under FIFA eligibility rules; some limited exceptions apply. Players may hold more than one non-FIFA nationality.

No.	Pos.	Nation	Player
—	GK	BER	Dwayne Adams
—	GK	BER	Shaquille Bean
—	GK	BER	Tariq Brown
—	DF	BER	Russ Ford
—	DF	BER	Jomari Gooden
—	DF	BER	Tahzeiko Harris
—	DF	BER	Jameko Harvey-Outerbridge
—	DF	BER	Adolphus Lambert
—	DF	BER	Dennis Lister
—	DF	BER	Trevin Ming
—	DF	BER	Jensen Rogers
—	DF	BER	Daunte Woods
—	MF	BER	Vashun Blanchette
—	MF	BER	Sean Brangman
—	MF	BER	Justin Corday
—	MF	BER	Coolidge Durham
—	MF	BER	Trae Harvey
—	MF	BER	Zahkie Iris

No.	Pos.	Nation	Player
—	MF	BER	Calin Maybury
—	MF	BER	Taj-Rae Outerbridge
—	MF	BER	Jaden Ratteray-Smith
—	MF	BER	Ayshaun Smith
—	MF	BER	Antoine Seaman
—	MF	BER	Damon Swan
—	MF	BER	Alton Trott
—	MF	BER	W White
—	FW	BER	Jonathan Bean
—	FW	BER	Leo Burgess
—	FW	BER	Jaz Ratteray-Smith
—	FW	BER	Dion Stovell
—	FW	BER	Tahj Wade
—		BER	Figre Crockwell
—		BER	Haile Eve
—		BER	J Greaves
—		BER	Makai Joell
