= PHC Zebras =

Association football club in Bermuda

- Full name: The Pembroke Hamilton Club Inc.
- Nickname: Zebras
- Short name: PHC
- Founded: 1960; 66 years ago
- Ground: PHC Field, Warwick, Bermuda
- Capacity: 2,000
- Chairman: Mike Trott
- Manager: Winston Trott
- League: Bermudian Premier Division
- 2025–26: Bermudian Premier Division, 3rd

The Pembroke Hamilton Club Zebras is a Bermudian professional football club based in Hamilton that participates in the Bermudian Premier Division.

They play their home games on PHC Field at "Stadium Lane", which was reopened in 2015 after 17 years. It was named Warwick Stadium when it hosted its first match in the Bermuda Football Union.

== History ==
- 1876: Club founded as Pembroke Hamilton Club. It is then a nautical club.
- 1960: The club merged with the Key West Rangers Football Club and was renamed PHC Zebras.
- PHC Zebras have won the Bermudian Premier Division title 12 times, the Friendship Trophy 13 times and the Bermuda FA Cup 11 times, but the latter only three times since 1980. In the 2022–23 season, PHC went on to win the Bermuda Premier Division and the Friendship Trophy for the 12th and 13th time respectively.

== Achievements ==
- Bermudian Premier Division: 13

1970–71, 1976–77, 1984–85, 1985–86, 1988–89, 1989–90, 1991–92, 1999–2000, 2007–08, 2017–18, 2018–19, 2022–23, 2023–24

- Bermuda FA Cup: 11

1956–57, 1959–60, 1960–61, 1961–62, 1966–67, 1970–71, 1974–75, 1979–80, 1991–92, 2007–08, 2016–17

- Friendship Trophy: 13

1970–71, 1971–72, 1972–73, 1974–75, 1985–86, 1986–87, 1987–88, 1989–90, 2001–02, 2008–09, 2017–18, 2018–19, 2022–23

- Dudley Eve Trophy: 8

1981–82, 1985–86, 1988–89, 1989–90, 1990–91, 1996–97, 2015–16, 2017–18

- Charity Shield: 7

1988–89, 1989–90, 1990–91, 1991–92, 2007–08, 2016–17, 2017–18

- Martonmere Cup: 3

1975–76, 1982–83, 2007–08

- No longer played since 2010

== Historical list of coaches ==
- (Bermuda) Edward Durham (1992–1997)
- (Bermuda) Kyle Lightbourne (Aug 2006 – Mar 2011)
- (Bermuda) Brian "Bulla" Anderson (Aug 2011–2012)
- (Bermuda) Mark Wade (2013–2016)
- (Bermuda) Scott Morton (Aug 2016–2019)
- (Iran) Saeid Jalali (2019–2020)
- (Bermuda) Winston Trott (2020–2023)
- (Bermuda) Quincy Hunt (2023–present)
