= Devonshire Cougars =

Association football club in Bermuda

- Full name: Devonshire Recreation Club Inc
- Founded: 1945
- Ground: Devonshire Recreation Club; Bermuda
- Owner: Kwame Steede
- Head coach: Mark Mills
- League: Bermudian Premier Division
- 2025–26: Bermudian Premier Division, 5th of 10

Devonshire Cougars, also known as Devinshire Recreation Club Inc, is a professional football club based in Devonshire, Bermuda and are in the Bermudian Premier Division league. Team colours are green and yellow.

== History ==
The club has won the Bermudian league title 4 times, in 2005, 2007, 2009 and 2013. They won their most recent title in March 2013 when Somerset Eagles beat Cougars' final challengers North Village Rams to pull them out of the title race.

In the 2009–10 season, Devonshire Cougars won their first FA Cup after defeating the Somerset Eagles.

On 4 July 2012 they lost Bermudian international Tumaini Steede in a bike accident, with coach Dennis Brown citing the 2012/13 season would be dedicated to Steede. They also considered to retire Steede's number 10 shirt.

== Achievements ==
- Cingular Wireless Premier Division: 4

2004/05, 2006/07, 2008/09, 2012/13

- FA Challenge Cup: 3

2009/10 2010/11 2012/13

- Bermuda Charity Shield: 2

2006/07 2010/11

- Bermuda Friendship Trophy: 2

2004/05 2012/13

- Bermuda Martonmere Cup: 3

2001/02, 2006/07, 2008/09

- Bermuda Dudley Eve Trophy: 2

2005/06 2016/17

== Staff and board members ==
- President: (Bermuda) Kwame Steede
- Vice President: (Bermuda) Derek deChabert
- Treasurer: Gina Benjamin
- Secretary: Sharika Iris
- Assistant Secretary: Angelika Marshall

== Sponsors ==
- Restore Pro Bda (2025-Present)
- Mussenden Subair Limited (2012–2013)
- Burt Construction Ltd. (2009–2012)
- Matches Lane (2009/10)
- Twist Trucking (2009/10)

== Historical list of coaches ==
- (Bermuda) Devarr Boyles (Mar 2010 – Jun 2010)
- (Bermuda) Dennis Brown (2011 – Apr 2014)
- (Bermuda) Andrew Bascome (Sep 2014 – Aug 2015)
- (Bermuda) Kwame Steede (2015–2016)
- (Bermuda) Omar Butterfield (Mar 2016 – January 2019)
- (Bermuda) Vance Brown (January 2019 – present)
