= Dandy Town Hornets F.C. =

Association football club in Bermuda

Bermuda Hill F.C.
- Full name: Bermuda Hill
- Nickname: The Hornets
- Founded: 1973
- Ground: St John's Field; Pembroke Parish, Bermuda, Bermuda
- Capacity: 1,000
- Chairman: Willis Dill
- Head coach: Jomar Wilkinson
- League: Bermudian Premier Division
- 2025–26: Bermuda Premier Division, Champions
Home colours	Away colours

Dandy Town Hornets F.C. is a professional football club in Pembroke Parish, Bermuda, that currently competes in the Bermudian Premier Division.

Team colours are brown and gold. The club also has a ladies team and a strong youth section.

== History ==
Founded in 1973, the club fall under auspices of the Western Stars Sports Club and have won the Bermudian league title eight times in their history. Their seventh was in March 2014, with a victory over the Devonshire Cougars, and their eighth was in March 2016 after taking an unassailable lead over nearest challengers Robin Hood with two games to spare.

== Achievements ==
- Cingular Wireless Premier Division: 10

1987–88, 1993–94, 2000–01, 2003–04, 2009–10, 2011–12, 2013–14, 2015–16, 2016–17, 2025-26

- Bermuda FA Cup: 5

1986–87, 2011–12, 2013–14, 2014–15, 2021–22

- Bermuda Friendship Trophy: 4

1990–91, 1993–94, 1994–95, 2002–03

- Bermuda Martonmere Cup: 6

1987–88, 1990–91, 1998–99, 1999–00, 2005–06, 2009–10

- Bermuda Dudley Eve Trophy: 5

1986–87, 1993–94, 2008–09, 2011–12, 2013–14

- Bermuda Champions Cup: 1

2004–05

- Bermuda Super Cup: 4

1993–94, 2000–01, 2005–06, 2011–12

== Performance in CONCACAF competitions ==
- CONCACAF Champions' Cup - (North Zone): 1 appearance

Best: Never passed a round

Year	Opponent	1st leg	2nd leg
1991	(United States) Brooklyn Italians	3–1	0–3

== Historical list of coaches ==
- (Bermuda) Meshach Wade (September 2008- Dec 2008)
- (Bermuda) Scott Morton (December 2008-)
- (Bermuda) Jomar Wilkinson (2010–present)
