= North Village Rams =

Association football club in Bermuda

- Nickname: The Rams
- Short name: North Village Rams
- Founded: 1957
- Ground: Bernard Park, Pembroke Parish, Bermuda
- President: Stephen Coddington
- Head coach: Richard Todd
- League: Bermudian Premier Division
- 2025–26: Bermudian Premier Division, 4th of 10

North Village Rams is a Bermudian professional football club based in Pembroke Parish who participate in the Bermudian Premier Division.

== History ==
The club, also named North Village Community Club, has won the Bermudian league title eight times.

On 17 July 2013 the club signed a development partnership contract with Scottish side Rangers. The club was coached by Ralph Bean Jr. and as assistant coach worked the former Bermuda national team captain Stephen Coddington.

== Achievements ==
- Singular Wireless Premier Division: 10

1973–74, 1975–76, 1977–78, 1978–79, 2001–02, 2002–03, 2005–06, 2010–11, 2019–20, 2024–25

- Bermuda FA Cup: 12

1977–78, 1982–83, 1985–86, 1988–89, 1999–00, 2001–02, 2002–03, 2003–04, 2004–05, 2005–06, 2022–23, 2024–25, 2025-26

== Year-by-year ==
| Season | Division | League | Cup |
|---|---|---|---|
| 2009–10 | Premier | 2nd | |
| 2010–11 | Premier | Champion | |
| 2011–12 | Premier | 2nd | |

== Historical list of coaches ==
- (Bermuda) Shaun Goater (2008–2013)
- (Bermuda) Ralph Bean jr. (2013–2015)
- (Bermuda) Richard Todd (2015–present)
