= 2013 CONCACAF Gold Cup Group B =

Group B of the 2013 CONCACAF Gold Cup was one of three groups competing at the tournament. The group's first round of matches were played on July 8, with the final round played on July 15. All six group matches were played at venues in the United States: in Harrison, New Jersey, in Miami Gardens, Florida, and in Houston, Texas. The group consisted of Haiti, Honduras, El Salvador and Trinidad and Tobago.

== Standings ==
Key to colors in group tables
Teams that advanced to the quarter-finals: Group winners; Group runners-up; Best two third-placed teams among all groups

Pos	Team	Pld	W	D	L	GF	GA	GD	Pts	Qualification
1	Honduras	3	2	0	1	3	2	+1	6	Advance to knockout stage
2	Trinidad and Tobago	3	1	1	1	4	4	0	4	Advance to knockout stage
3	El Salvador	3	1	1	1	3	3	0	4	Advance to knockout stage
4	Haiti	3	1	0	2	2	3	−1	3	

== Matches ==
All times are EDT (UTC−4).

=== El Salvador vs Trinidad and Tobago ===
July 8, 2013
19:00

El Salvador	2–2	Trinidad and Tobago
Zelaya 22', 69'	Report	Daniel 11'; K. Jones 73'

Red Bull Arena, Harrison
Attendance: 20,000
Referee: Marco Rodríguez (Mexico)

El Salvador	Trinidad and Tobago

GK	1	Dagoberto Portillo
RB	2	Xavier García
CB	3	Víctor Turcios (c)
CB	4	Steve Purdy	(substituted off) 88'
LB	16	Marcelo Posadas
RM	7	Darwin Ceren
CM	8	Osael Romero
LM	6	Richard Menjivar
RF	11	Rodolfo Zelaya
CF	14	Dustin Corea	(substituted off) 62'
LF	9	Rafael Burgos	(substituted off) 80'
Substitutions:
MF	12	Andrés Flores	(substituted on) 62'
FW	17	Léster Blanco	(substituted on) 80'
DF	23	José Henríquez	(substituted on) 88'
Manager:
(Peru) Agustín Castillo

GK	21	Jan-Michael Williams
RB	11	Carlos Edwards
CB	17	Justin Hoyte
CB	5	Carlyle Mitchell		(substituted off) 85'
LB	3	Joevin Jones
RM	20	Seon Power
CM	19	Keon Daniel		(substituted off) 85'
CM	8	Khaleem Hyland
CM	16	Kevon Carter		(substituted off) 71'
LM	18	Densill Theobald (c)
CF	9	Kenwyne Jones	(yellow card) 58'
Substitutions:
MF	12	Darryl Roberts		(substituted on) 71'
DF	6	Daneil Cyrus		(substituted on) 85'
FW	23	Jamal Gay		(substituted on) 85'
Manager:
Stephen Hart

Assistant referees:
Marcos Quintero (Mexico)
Marvin Torrentera (Mexico)
Fourth official:
Jair Marrufo (United States)

=== Haiti vs Honduras ===
July 8, 2013
21:30

Haiti	0–2	Honduras
	Report	R. Martínez 4'; M. Chávez 78'

Red Bull Arena, Harrison
Attendance: 20,000
Referee: Hugo Cruz Alvarado (Costa Rica)

Haiti	Honduras

GK	1	Frandy Montrévil
RB	3	Mechack Jérôme
CB	2	Jean Sony Alcénat
CB	8	Judelin Aveska	(yellow card) 70'
LB	4	Wilde-Donald Guerrier	(yellow card) 88'
DM	17	Hérold Charles Jr.
CM	14	Peterson Joseph		(substituted off) 56'
CM	16	Jean Alexandre (c)
RW	7	Jeff Louis		(substituted off) 60'
LW	15	Yves Desmarets		(substituted off) 76'
CF	18	Leonel Saint-Preux
Substitutions:
FW	11	Jean-Eudes Maurice		(substituted on) 56'
FW	10	Peguero Jean Philippe		(substituted on) 60'
DF	20	Olrish Saurel		(substituted on) 76'
Manager:
(Cuba) Israel Blake Cantero

GK	22	Donis Escober
RB	4	Johnny Palacios
CB	3	Brayan Beckeles	(yellow card) 73'
CB	2	Osman Chávez (c)
LB	6	Juan Carlos García
DM	14	Andy Najar
RM	23	Edder Delgado
LM	20	Jorge Claros
AM	10	Mario Martínez		(substituted off) 69'
CF	21	Roger Rojas		(substituted off) 53'
CF	11	Rony Martínez		(substituted off) 84'
Substitutions:
MF	17	Marvin Chávez		(substituted on) 53'
MF	16	Alexander López		(substituted on) 69'
MF	19	Wilmer Fuentes		(substituted on) 84'
Manager:
(Colombia) Luis Fernando Suárez

Assistant referees:
Philippe Brière (Canada)
Ricardo Morgan (Jamaica)
Fourth official:
Javier Santos (Puerto Rico)

=== Trinidad and Tobago vs Haiti ===
July 12, 2013
19:00

Trinidad and Tobago	0–2	Haiti
	Report	Maurice 16', 53'

Sun Life Stadium, Miami Gardens
Attendance: 28,713
Referee: Jeffrey Solis Calderón (Costa Rica)

Trinidad and Tobago	Haiti

GK	21	Jan-Michael Williams
RB	17	Justin Hoyte		(substituted off) 71'
CB	5	Carlyle Mitchell
CB	20	Seon Power
LB	3	Joevin Jones		(substituted off) 61'
RM	19	Keon Daniel		(substituted off) 57'
CM	18	Densill Theobald (c)
CM	8	Khaleem Hyland
LM	11	Carlos Edwards|
CF	9	Kenwyne Jones
CF	12	Darryl Roberts
Substitutions:
FW	23	Jamal Gay		(substituted on) 57'
DF	25	Aubrey David		(substituted on) 61'
MF	10	Kevin Molino	(yellow card) 76'	(substituted on) 71'
Manager:
Stephen Hart

GK	1	Frandy Montrévil
RB	3	Mechack Jérôme
CB	2	Jean Sony Alcénat	(yellow card) 58'
CB	8	Judelin Aveska
LB	19	Kim Jaggy
RM	7	Jeff Louis		(substituted off) 90+2'
CM	13	Monuma Constant Jr.
CM	15	Yves Desmarets
LM	16	Jean Alexandre (c)
CF	11	Jean-Eudes Maurice		(substituted off) 81'
CF	10	Peguero Jean Philippe		(substituted off) 64'
Substitutions:
DF	6	Kevin Lafrance		(substituted on) 64'
DF	5	Jean-Jacques Pierre		(substituted on) 81'
MF	14	Peterson Joseph		(substituted on) 90+2'
Manager:
(Cuba) Israel Blake Cantero

Assistant referees:
Marcos Quintero (Mexico)
Philippe Brière (Canada)
Fourth official:
Marco Rodríguez (Mexico)

=== Honduras vs El Salvador ===
July 12, 2013
21:30

Honduras	1–0	El Salvador
Claros 90+2'	Report

Sun Life Stadium, Miami Gardens
Attendance: 28,713
Referee: Jair Marrufo (United States)

Honduras	El Salvador

GK	22	Donis Escober
RB	2	Osman Chávez (c)
CB	6	Juan Carlos García
CB	5	David Velásquez	(yellow card) 37'
LB	3	Brayan Beckeles
MF	20	Jorge Claros
MF	15	Mario Berríos		(substituted off) 67'
MF	23	Edder Delgado
MF	16	Alexander López
MF	14	Andy Najar		(substituted off) 79'
FW	11	Rony Martínez		(substituted off) 65'
Substitutions:
FW	21	Roger Rojas		(substituted on) 65'
MF	17	Marvin Chávez		(substituted on) 67'
MF	10	Mario Martínez		(substituted on) 79'
Manager:
(Colombia) Luis Fernando Suárez

GK	1	Dagoberto Portillo
DF	23	José Henríquez
DF	3	Víctor Turcios (c)
DF	2	Xavier García	(yellow card) 72'
DF	16	Marcelo Posadas
MF	8	Osael Romero		(substituted off) 85'
MF	7	Darwin Cerén
MF	6	Richard Menjivar	(yellow card) 5'
FW	11	Rodolfo Zelaya
FW	9	Rafael Burgos		(substituted off) 65'
FW	14	Dustin Corea		(substituted off) 60'
Substitutions:
MF	12	Andrés Flores		(substituted on) 60'
FW	17	Léster Blanco		(substituted on) 65'
MF	10	Kevin Santamaría		(substituted on) 85'
Manager:
(Peru) Agustín Castillo

Assistant referees:
Eric Boria (United States)
Ricardo Morgan (Jamaica)
Fourth official:
Javier Santos (Puerto Rico)

=== El Salvador vs Haiti ===
July 15, 2013
19:00

El Salvador	1–0	Haiti
Zelaya 76'	Report

BBVA Compass Stadium, Houston
Attendance: 21,783
Referee: Javier Santos (Puerto Rico)

El Salvador	Haiti

GK	1	Dagoberto Portillo
DF	23	José Henríquez
DF	3	Víctor Turcios (c)
DF	2	Xavier García
DF	16	Marcelo Posadas
MF	8	Osael Romero		(substituted off) 65'
MF	12	Andrés Flores
MF	7	Darwin Cerén
MF	6	Richard Menjivar
FW	11	Rodolfo Zelaya	(yellow card) 44'
FW	17	Léster Blanco		(substituted off) 60'
Substitutions:
FW	9	Rafael Burgos	(substituted on) 60'	(substituted off) 88'
MF	10	Kevin Santamaría		(substituted on) 65'
MF	19	Gerson Mayen		(substituted on) 88'
Manager:
(Peru) Agustín Castillo

GK	1	Frandy Montrévil	(yellow card) 75'
RB	3	Mechack Jérôme
CB	8	Judelin Aveska	(yellow card) 33'
CB	2	Jean Sony Alcénat
LB	19	Kim Jaggy
RM	7	Jeff Louis	(yellow card) 66'	(substituted off) 68'
CM	15	Yves Desmarets		(substituted off) 76'
CM	13	Monuma Constant Jr.
LM	16	Jean Alexandre (c)
CF	11	Jean-Eudes Maurice	(yellow card) 74'
CF	18	Leonel Saint-Preux		(substituted off) 17'
Substitutions:
FW	10	Peguero Jean Philippe		(substituted on) 17'
MF	14	Peterson Joseph		(substituted on) 68'
DF	5	Jean-Jacques Pierre		(substituted on) 76'
Manager:
(Cuba) Israel Blake Cantero

Assistant referees:
Ricardo Morgan (Jamaica)
Philippe Brière (Canada)
Fourth official:
Jair Marrufo (United States)

=== Honduras vs Trinidad and Tobago ===
July 15, 2013
21:30

Honduras	0–2	Trinidad and Tobago
	Report	K. Jones 48' (pen.); Molino 67'

BBVA Compass Stadium, Houston
Attendance: 21,783
Referee: Marco Rodríguez (Mexico)

Honduras	Trinidad and Tobago

GK	18	Kevin Hernández
DF	13	Nery Medina
DF	4	Johnny Palacios		(substituted off) 51'
DF	12	Orlin Peralta
DF	5	David Velásquez	(red card) 38'
MF	15	Mario Berríos (c)
MF	19	Wilmer Fuentes
MF	10	Mario Martínez		(substituted off) 43'
MF	8	Gerson Rodas		(substituted off) 63'
MF	16	Alexander López
FW	9	Jerry Palacios	(yellow card) 53'
Substitutions:
DF	2	Osman Chávez		(substituted on) 43'
DF	6	Juan Carlos García		(substituted on) 51'
FW	21	Roger Rojas		(substituted on) 63'
Manager:
(Colombia) Luis Fernando Suárez

GK	21	Jan-Michael Williams
DF	5	Carlyle Mitchell
DF	32	Radanfah Abu Bakr
DF	6	Daneil Cyrus
DF	3	Joevin Jones		(substituted off) 80'
MF	14	Andre Boucaud
MF	8	Khaleem Hyland	(yellow card) 11'
MF	10	Kevin Molino	(yellow card) 10'
MF	12	Darryl Roberts		(substituted off) 71'
FW	9	Kenwyne Jones (c)
FW	13	Cornell Glen		(substituted off) 68'
Substitutions:
FW	23	Jamal Gay		(substituted on) 68'
MF	11	Carlos Edwards		(substituted on) 71'
DF	25	Aubrey David		(substituted on) 80'
Manager:
Stephen Hart

Assistant referees:
Eric Boria (United States)
Marvin Torrentera (Mexico)
Fourth official:
Hugo Cruz Alvarado (Costa Rica)
