= Haiti national football team results (2010–present) =

This page details the match results and statistics of the Haiti national football team from 2010 to present.

== Key ==
Key to matches

- Att.=Match attendance
- (H)=Home ground
- (A)=Away ground
- (N)=Neutral ground

Key to record by opponent

- Pld=Games played
- W=Games won
- D=Games drawn
- L=Games lost
- GF=Goals for
- GA=Goals against

== Results ==
Haiti's score is shown first in each case.

Haiti national football team results
No.	Date	Venue	Opponents	Score	Competition	Haiti scorers	Att.	Ref.
395	24 March 2010		Martinique	0–0	Friendly			
396	5 May 2010	Coloso de Ruca Quimey, Cutral Có (A)	Argentina	0–4	Friendly		16,500	
397	2 November 2010	Manny Ramjohn Stadium, San Fernando (N)	Guyana	0–0	2010 Caribbean Cup qualification		880	
398	4 November 2010	Manny Ramjohn Stadium, San Fernando (N)	Saint Vincent and the Grenadines	3–1	2010 Caribbean Cup qualification	Norde 45', Saint-Preux 62', Charles 83'	1,100	
399	6 November 2010	Manny Ramjohn Stadium, San Fernando (A)	Trinidad and Tobago	0–4	2010 Caribbean Cup qualification		850	
400	18 November 2010	Khalifa International Stadium, Al Rayyan (A)	Qatar	1–0	Friendly	Monuma 52'	5,000	
401	9 February 2011	Estadio Cuscatlán, San Salvador (A)	El Salvador	0–1	Friendly		15,000	
402	2 September 2011	Stade Sylvio Cator, Port-au-Prince (H)	U.S. Virgin Islands	6–0	2014 FIFA World Cup qualification	Marcelin 18', Maurice 27', Pierre-Louis 44', Monuma 61', Alexandre 65', 78'	12,000	
403	6 September 2011	Ergilio Hato Stadium, Willemstad (A)	Curaçao	4–2	2014 FIFA World Cup qualification	Lafrance 37', Marcelin 58', Guerrier 61', Zimmerman 75' o.g.	5,000	
404	7 October 2011		U.S. Virgin Islands	7–0	2014 FIFA World Cup qualification	Maurice 5', 66', 82' (pen.), Jaggy 11', Belfort 57', 74' (pen.), Goreux 64'	406	
405	11 October 2011		Curaçao	2–2	2014 FIFA World Cup qualification	Maurice 25' (pen.), Belfort 60'	7,800	
406	11 November 2011		Antigua and Barbuda	0–1	2014 FIFA World Cup qualification		8,000	
407	15 November 2011		Antigua and Barbuda	2–1	2014 FIFA World Cup qualification	Aveska 60', Belfort 67'	3,000	
408	7 September 2012	Stade Sylvio Cator, Port-au-Prince (H)	Saint Martin	7–0	2012 Caribbean Cup qualification	Peguero 4', 40', 45', Monuma 22', 43', Lafrance 70', Maurice 90'	10,000	
409	9 September 2012	Stade Sylvio Cator, Port-au-Prince (H)	Bermuda	2–1	2012 Caribbean Cup qualification	Saurel 30', Maurice 39', Peguero 41'	5,500	
410	11 September 2012	Stade Sylvio Cator, Port-au-Prince (H)	Puerto Rico	2–1	2012 Caribbean Cup qualification	Peguero 65', Maurice 67'	12,000	
411	16 September 2012		French Guiana	2–1	Friendly	Louis 27', Walson 62'		
412	14 November 2012	Kirani James Athletic Stadium, St. George's (N)	Guyana	1–0	2012 Caribbean Cup qualification	Saurel 47'	1,000	
413	16 November 2012	Kirani James Athletic Stadium, St. George's (N)	French Guiana	0–1	2012 Caribbean Cup qualification		750	
414	18 November 2012	Kirani James Athletic Stadium, St. George's (A)	Grenada	2–0	2012 Caribbean Cup qualification	Alcénat 36', Straker 58' o.g.	3,000	
415	7 December 2012	Antigua Recreation Ground, St. John's (N)	Trinidad and Tobago	0–0	2012 Caribbean Cup		150	
416	9 December 2012	Antigua Recreation Ground, St. John's (N)	Dominican Republic	2–1	2012 Caribbean Cup	Saint-Preux 10', Peguero 39'	800	
417	11 December 2012	Antigua Recreation Ground, St. John's (A)	Antigua and Barbuda	1–0	2012 Caribbean Cup	Peguero 19'	800	
418	14 December 2012	Antigua Recreation Ground, St. John's (N)	Cuba	0–1	2012 Caribbean Cup		200	
419	16 December 2012	Antigua Recreation Ground, St. John's (N)	Martinique	1–0 (a.e.t.)	2012 Caribbean Cup	Saint-Preux 94'	100	
420	19 January 2013	Estadio Ester Roa, Concepción (A)	Chile	0–3	Friendly		22,000	
421	6 February 2013	Estadio Ramón Tahuichi Aguilera, Santa Cruz (A)	Bolivia	1–2	Friendly	Belfort 10'	8,000	
422	20 March 2013	Sultan Qaboos Sports Complex, Muscat (A)	Oman	0–3	Friendly		500	
423	24 March 2013	Estadio Panamericano, San Cristóbal (A)	Dominican Republic	1–3	Friendly	Hérold 90' (pen.)	1,000	
424	8 June 2013	Sun Life Stadium, Miami Gardens (N)	Spain	1–2	Friendly	Guerrier 74'	36,525	
425	11 June 2013	Maracanã Stadium, Rio de Janeiro (N)	Italy	2–2	Friendly	Millien 85' (pen.), Peguero 90+1'	15,000	
426	8 July 2013		Honduras	0–2	2013 CONCACAF Gold Cup		20,000	
427	12 July 2013		Trinidad and Tobago	2–0	2013 CONCACAF Gold Cup	Maurice 16', 53'	28,713	
428	15 July 2013		El Salvador	0–1	2013 CONCACAF Gold Cup		21,783	
429	6 September 2013	Incheon Football Stadium, Incheon (A)	South Korea	1–4	Friendly	Belfort 45+1'	13,624	
430	5 March 2014	Adem Jashari Olympic Stadium, Mitrovica (A)	Kosovo	0–0	Friendly		17,000	
431	9 September 2014	Lockhart Stadium, Fort Lauderdale (N)	Chile	0–1	Friendly		15,000	
432	8 October 2014	Stade Sylvio Cator, Port-au-Prince (N)	French Guiana	2–2	2014 Caribbean Cup qualification	Louis 29', Alcénat 45'		
433	10 October 2014		Barbados	4–2	2014 Caribbean Cup qualification			
434	12 October 2014		Saint Kitts and Nevis	0–0	2014 Caribbean Cup qualification			
435	12 November 2014		Antigua and Barbuda	2–2	2014 Caribbean Cup			
436	14 November 2014		Martinique	3–0	2014 Caribbean Cup			
437	16 November 2014		Jamaica	0–2	2014 Caribbean Cup			
438	18 November 2014		Cuba	2–1	2014 Caribbean Cup			
439	27 March 2015	Helong Stadium, Changsha (A)	China	2–2	Friendly	Louis 34', Guerrier 73'	25,533	
440	3 July 2015	Central Broward Park, Fort Lauderdale (N)	Trinidad and Tobago	0–1	Friendly		0	
441	7 July 2015	Toyota Stadium, Frisco (N)	Panama	1–1	2015 CONCACAF Gold Cup	Nazon 86'	22,357	
442	10 July 2015	Gillette Stadium, Foxborough (N)	United States	0–1	2015 CONCACAF Gold Cup		46,720	
443	13 July 2015	Sporting Park, Kansas City (N)	Honduras	1–0	2015 CONCACAF Gold Cup	Nazon 14'	18,467	
444	18 July 2015	M&T Bank Stadium, Baltimore (N)	Jamaica	0–1	2015 CONCACAF Gold Cup		37,994	
445	4 September 2015	Grenada National Stadium, St. George's (A)	Grenada	3–1	2018 FIFA World Cup qualification	Maurice 27', Jérôme 39', Nazon 55'	5,100	
446	8 September 2015	Stade Sylvio Cator, Port-au-Prince (H)	Grenada	3–0	2018 FIFA World Cup qualification	Guerrier 26', Nazon 37', Belfort 49'	13,764	
447	9 October 2015	BBVA Compass Stadium, Houston (N)	El Salvador	3–1	Friendly	Marcelin 14', Printemps 18', Maurice 23'		
448	13 November 2015	Estadio Nacional de Costa Rica, San José (A)	Costa Rica	0–1	2018 FIFA World Cup qualification		35,000	
449	17 November 2015	Stade Sylvio Cator, Port-au-Prince (H)	Jamaica	0–1	2018 FIFA World Cup qualification		12,155	
450	8 January 2016	Estadio Rommel Fernández, Panama City (N)	Trinidad and Tobago	1–0	Copa América Centenario qualifying play-offs	Millien 86'		
451	25 March 2016	Stade Sylvio Cator, Port-au-Prince (H)	Panama	0–0	2018 FIFA World Cup qualification		11,410	
452	29 March 2016	Estadio Rommel Fernández, Panama City (A)	Panama	0–1	2018 FIFA World Cup qualification		13,082	
453	29 May 2016	Marlins Park, Miami (N)	Colombia	1–3	Friendly	Guerrier 35'	18,000	
454	4 June 2016	Lumen Field, Seattle (N)	Peru	0–1	Copa América Centenario		20,190	
455	8 June 2016	Camping World Stadium, Orlando (N)	Brazil	1–7	Copa América Centenario	Marcelin 70'	28,241	
456	12 June 2016	MetLife Stadium, East Rutherford (N)	Ecuador	0–4	Copa América Centenario		50,976	
457	2 September 2016	Stade Sylvio Cator, Port-au-Prince (H)	Costa Rica	0–1	2018 FIFA World Cup qualification		3,200	
458	6 September 2016	Independence Park, Kingston (A)	Jamaica	2–0	2018 FIFA World Cup qualification	Lafrance 68', Nazon 88'	3,603	
459	9 November 2016	Stade Sylvio Cator, Port-au-Prince (H)	French Guiana	2–5	2017 Caribbean Cup qualification	Jérôme 3 (pen.), Nazon 27'		
460	13 November 2016	Warner Park Sporting Complex, Basseterre (A)	Saint Kitts and Nevis	2–0 (a.e.t.)	2017 Caribbean Cup qualification	Nazon 103', 118'		
461	6 January 2017		Suriname	4–2	2017 Caribbean Cup qualification			
462	8 January 2017		Trinidad and Tobago	4–3 (a.e.t.)	2017 Caribbean Cup qualification			
463	24 March 2017	Stade Sylvio Cator, Port-au-Prince (H)	Nicaragua	3–1	2017 CONCACAF Gold Cup qualification play-off	Louis 18', 55', Guerrier 39'		
464	28 March 2017	Dennis Martínez National Stadium, Managua (A)	Nicaragua	0–3	2017 CONCACAF Gold Cup qualification play-off			
465	10 October 2017	Nissan Stadium, Yokohama (A)	Japan	3–3	Friendly	Lafrance 28', Nazon 53', 78'	47,420	
466	10 November 2017		United Arab Emirates	1–0	Friendly			
467	29 March 2018	La Bombonera, Buenos Aires (A)	Argentina	0–4	Friendly		40,000	
468	10 September 2018	Stade Sylvio Cator, Port-au-Prince (H)	Sint Maarten	13–0	2019–20 CONCACAF Nations League qualifying	Pierrot 11', 72', Nazon 19', 35', 42', 61', 64', Forsythe 26' (o.g.), Hérold 47', Arcus 59', Etienne 71', Mustivar 86', Louis 88'		
469	16 October 2018	Stade Pierre-Aliker, Fort-de-France (N)	Saint Lucia	2–1	2019–20 CONCACAF Nations League qualifying	Mustivar 13', Hérold 34'		
470	17 November 2018	Nicaragua National Football Stadium, Managua (A)	Nicaragua	2–0	2019–20 CONCACAF Nations League qualifying	Cantave 12', Etienne 31'		
471	20 November 2018		El Salvador	0–1	Friendly			
472	24 March 2019	Stade Sylvio Cator, Port-au-Prince (H)	Cuba	2–1	2019–20 CONCACAF Nations League qualifying	Nazon 26', Lafrance 87'		
473	2 June 2019		El Salvador	0–1	Friendly			
474	6 June 2019	Estadio La Portada, La Serena (A)	Chile	1–2	Friendly	Pierrot 26'	12,001	
475	11 June 2019		Guyana	3–1	Friendly			
476	16 June 2019	Estadio Nacional de Costa Rica, San José (N)	Bermuda	2–1	2019 CONCACAF Gold Cup	Pierrot 54', 66'	19,140	
477	20 June 2019	Toyota Stadium, Frisco (N)	Nicaragua	2–0	2019 CONCACAF Gold Cup	Saba 22', Rosas 33' (o.g.)	20,500	
478	24 June 2019	Red Bull Arena, Harrison (N)	Costa Rica	2–1	2019 CONCACAF Gold Cup	Nazon 57' (pen.), Alexis 81'	20,044	
479	29 June 2019	NRG Stadium, Houston (N)	Canada	3–2	2019 CONCACAF Gold Cup	Nazon 50', Bazile 70' (pen.), Guerrier 76'	70,788	
480	2 July 2019	State Farm Stadium, Glendale (N)	Mexico	0–1 (a.e.t.)	2019 CONCACAF Gold Cup		62,363	
481	7 September 2019	Ergilio Hato Stadium, Willemstad (A)	Curaçao	0–1	2019–20 CONCACAF Nations League A			
482	10 September 2019	Stade Sylvio Cator, Port-au-Prince (H)	Curaçao	1–1	2019–20 CONCACAF Nations League A	Pierrot 15'		
483	10 October 2019	Thomas Robinson Stadium, Nassau (N)	Costa Rica	1–1	2019–20 CONCACAF Nations League A	Pierrot 82'		
484	15 October 2019	Estadio Ramón Tahuichi Aguilera, Santa Cruz (A)	Bolivia	1–3	Friendly	Álvarez 21' (o.g.)	35,710	
485	17 November 2019	Estadio Ricardo Saprissa Aymá, San José (A)	Costa Rica	1–1	2019–20 CONCACAF Nations League A	Nazon 38' (pen.)		
486	25 March 2021	Stade Sylvio Cator, Port-au-Prince (H)	Belize	2–0	2022 FIFA World Cup qualification	Adé 50', Séance 81'	300	
487	5 June 2021	TCIFA National Academy, Providenciales (A)	Turks and Caicos Islands	10–0	2022 FIFA World Cup qualification	Nazon 27', 30', 34', 37', Antoine 42', 53', 83', Pierrot 75', 87', 90'	0	
488	8 June 2021	Stade Sylvio Cator, Port-au-Prince (H)	Nicaragua	1–0	2022 FIFA World Cup qualification	Etienne 63'	0	
489	12 June 2021	Stade Sylvio Cator, Port-au-Prince (H)	Canada	0–1	2022 FIFA World Cup qualification		0	
490	15 June 2021	SeatGeek Stadium, Bridgeview (N)	Canada	0–3	2022 FIFA World Cup qualification		0	
491	2 July 2021	DRV PNK Stadium, Fort Lauderdale (N)	Saint Vincent and the Grenadines	6–1	2021 CONCACAF Gold Cup qualification	Nazon 26' (pen.), 59', Pierrot 34', Etienne 37 (pen.), Sutherland 72' (o.g.), Antoine 90'	0	
492	6 July 2021	DRV PNK Stadium, Fort Lauderdale (N)	Bermuda	4–1	2021 CONCACAF Gold Cup qualification	Pierrot 23', 28', 34', Nazon 87' (pen.)	0	
493	11 July 2021	Children's Mercy Park, Kansas City (N)	United States	0–1	2021 CONCACAF Gold Cup		12,664	
494	15 July 2021	Children's Mercy Park, Kansas City (N)	Canada	1–4	2021 CONCACAF Gold Cup	Lambese 56'	7,511	
495	18 July 2021	Toyota Stadium, Frisco (N)	Martinique	2–1	2021 CONCACAF Gold Cup		0	
496	1 September 2021	Bahrain National Stadium, Riffa (A)	Bahrain	1–6	Friendly	François 54'		
497	4 September 2021	Bahrain National Stadium, Riffa (N)	Jordan	2–0	Friendly	Naseeb 14' (o.g.), Chevreuil 45'		
498	27 March 2022	DRV PNK Stadium, Fort Lauderdale (N)	Guatemala	1–2	Friendly	Antoine 23'		
499	4 June 2022	Bermuda National Stadium, Devonshire Parish (A)	Bermuda	0–0	2022–23 CONCACAF Nations League B		1,859	
500	7 June 2022	Félix Sánchez Olympic Stadium, Santo Domingo (N)	Montserrat	3–2	2022–23 CONCACAF Nations League B	Prunier 5', Antoine 9', Saba 25'		
501	11 June 2022	Synthetic Track and Field Facility, Leonora (A)	Guyana	6–2	2022–23 CONCACAF Nations League B	Simonsen 4', Saba 9', Antoine 38', Etienne 41', 43', Christophe 79'		
502	14 June 2022	Félix Sánchez Olympic Stadium, Santo Domingo (N)	Guyana	6–0	2022–23 CONCACAF Nations League B	Christian 39', Prunier 48', 76', Simonsen 63', Antoine 87', 89'		
503	25 March 2023	Blakes Estate Stadium, Look Out (A)	Montserrat	4–0	2022–23 CONCACAF Nations League B	Nazon 49', Pierrot 60', Etienne 70', Prunier 84'		
504	28 March 2023	Estadio Panamericano, San Cristóbal (H)	Bermuda	3–1	2022–23 CONCACAF Nations League B	Pierrot 24', 25', Antoine 45'		
505	13 June 2023	Gardens North County District Park, Palm Beach Gardens (N)	Saint Kitts and Nevis	3–1	Friendly	Antoine 50', Prunier 60' and Saba 73'	0	
506	20 June 2023	Gardens North County District Park, Palm Beach Gardens (N)	Trinidad and Tobago	0–0	Friendly		0	
507	25 June 2023	NRG Stadium, Houston (N)	Qatar	2–1	2023 CONCACAF Gold Cup	Nazon 45+1' (pen.), Pierrot 90+7'	66,255	
508	29 June 2023	State Farm Stadium, Glendale (N)	Mexico	1–3	2023 CONCACAF Gold Cup	Jean Jacques 78'	34,517	
509	2 July 2023	Bank of America Stadium, Charlotte (N)	Honduras	1–2	2023 CONCACAF Gold Cup	Pierrot 20'	47,382	
510	8 September 2023	Estadio Panamericano, San Cristóbal (N)	Cuba	0–0	2023–24 CONCACAF Nations League A		550	
511	12 September 2023	Independence Park, Kingston (A)	Jamaica	2–2	2023–24 CONCACAF Nations League A	Don Deedson 11', 14'		
512	12 October 2023	Dr. Ir. Franklin Essed Stadion, Paramaribo (A)	Suriname	1–1	2023–24 CONCACAF Nations League A	Cantave 51'	2,553	
513	15 October 2023	Hasely Crawford Stadium, Port of Spain (N)	Jamaica	2–3	2023–24 CONCACAF Nations League A	Pierrot 15', 87'		
514	23 March 2024	Stade Municipal Dr. Edmard Lama, Cayenne (A)	French Guiana	1–1	Friendly	Nazon 36' (pen.)		
515	6 June 2024	Wildey Turf, Wildey (N)	Saint Lucia	2–1	2026 FIFA World Cup qualification	Duverne 47', Nazon 77'	88	
516	9 June 2024	Wildey Turf, Wildey (A)	Barbados	1–3	2026 FIFA World Cup qualification	Don Deedson 12', Lacroix 45+1', Labissiere 84'		
517	6 September 2024	Mayagüez Athletics Stadium, Mayagüez (A)	Puerto Rico	4–1	2024–25 CONCACAF Nations League B	Jean Jacques 50', Pierrot 59', Don Deedson 76', Nazon 83'		
518	9 September 2024	Mayagüez Athletics Stadium, Mayagüez (N)	Sint Maarten	6–0	2024–25 CONCACAF Nations League B	Attys 41', Nazon 59', 75', 82', Cantave 76', 84'		
519	11 October 2024	Trinidad Stadium, Oranjestad (A)	Aruba	3–1	2024–25 CONCACAF Nations League B	Pierrot 30', Nazon 38' (pen.), 61'	1,011	
520	14 October 2024	Trinidad Stadium, Oranjestad (A)	Aruba	5–3	2024–25 CONCACAF Nations League B	Jean Jacques 16', Don Deedson 42', Nazon 66' (pen.), Picault 76', Pierrot 89' (pen.)	837	
521	15 November 2024	Mayagüez Athletics Stadium, Mayagüez (N)	Sint Maarten	8–0	2024–25 CONCACAF Nations League B	Attys 1', Pierrot 14', 24', 52', Lacroix 19', Nazon 49', 58' (pen.), Prunier 66'		
522	18 November 2024	Mayagüez Athletics Stadium, Mayagüez (A)	Puerto Rico	3–0	2024–25 CONCACAF Nations League B	Attys 29', Don Deedson 53', Pierrot 70'		
523	22 March 2025	Mehdi Huseynzade Stadium, Sumgait (A)	Azerbaijan	3–0	Friendly	Pierrot 9', 63', Jean Jacques 83'		
524	7 June 2025	Trinidad Stadium, Oranjestad (A)	Aruba	5–0	2026 FIFA World Cup qualification	Jean Jacques 29', Pierrot 35', Providence 61', Nazon 67', Prunier 86'	673	
525	10 June 2025	Trinidad Stadium, Oranjestad (N)	Curaçao	1–5	2026 FIFA World Cup qualification	Don Deedson 61'	1,115	
526	15 June 2025	Snapdragon Stadium, San Diego (N)	Saudi Arabia	0–1	2025 Gold Cup		7,736	
527	19 June 2025	Shell Energy Stadium, Houston (N)	Trinidad and Tobago	1–1	2025 Gold Cup	Pierrot 49'	2,409	
528	22 June 2025	AT&T Stadium, Arlington (N)	United States	1–2	2025 Gold Cup	Don Deedson 19'	20,918	
529	5 September 2025	Ergilio Hato Stadium, Willemstad (N)	Honduras	0–0	2026 FIFA World Cup qualification			
530	9 September 2025	Estadio Nacional, San José (N)	Costa Rica	3–3	2026 FIFA World Cup qualification	K. Vargas 1', Martínez 35', J. Vargas 90+1'		
531	9 October 2025	Estadio Nacionall, Managua (N)	Nicaragua	3–0	2026 FIFA World Cup qualification	Nazon 12', Jean Jacques 35', Louicius90+2'		
532	13 October 2025	Estadio Nacional Chelato Uclés, Tegucigalpa (N)	Honduras	0–3	2026 FIFA World Cup qualification			
533	13 November 2025	Ergilio Hato Stadium, Willemstad (N)	Costa Rica	1–0	2026 FIFA World Cup qualification	Pierrot 44'		
534	18 November 2025	Ergilio Hato Stadium, Willemstad (N)	Nicaragua	2–0	2026 FIFA World Cup qualification	Louicius 9', Providence 45+1'		
535	28 March 2026	BMO Field, Toronto (N)	Tunisia	0–1	Friendly			
536	31 March 2026	BMO Field, Toronto (N)	Iceland	1–1	Friendly	Isidor 88'		
537	2 June 2026	Inter Miami CF Stadium, Fort Lauderdale (N)	New Zealand	4–0	Friendly	Providence 12', Joseph 51', Pierrot 62', Lacroix 87'		
538	5 June 2026	Nu Stadium, Miami (N)	Peru	1–2	Friendly	Isidor 16'	26,700	
539	13 June 2026	Gillette Stadium, Foxborough (N)	Scotland	0–1	2026 FIFA World Cup		64,146	
540	19 June 2026	Lincoln Financial Field, Philadelphia (N)	Brazil	0–3	2026 FIFA World Cup		68,234	
549	24 June 2026	Mercedes-Benz Stadium, Atlanta (N)	Morocco	2–4	2026 FIFA World Cup	Isidor	68,239	
