= 2012 Caribbean Cup qualification =

Tournament details
- Host countries: Haiti; Saint Lucia; Martinique; Barbados; Saint Kitts and Nevis; Grenada; Guadeloupe; Trinidad and Tobago
- Dates: 5 September – 18 November
- Teams: 25 (from 1 confederation)

A total of 25 teams entered the qualification process for the 2012 Caribbean Cup, competing for a total of 8 spots in the final tournament. Jamaica, as the holders, and Antigua and Barbuda, as hosts, qualified automatically, leaving 6 spots open for competition.

Although the qualifying tournament is also part of the 2013 CONCACAF Gold Cup qualifying process, the tournament has not been included by FIFA on the FIFA International Match Calendar meaning that the participating nations' first-choice players may not be available to play due to club commitments. FIFA allocated 7–11 September and 12–16 October on the FIFA event calendar.

== Participants ==
At the time of the original draw in March 2012, only Sint Maarten and Turks and Caicos Islands had not agreed to participate. In August 2012, the Bahamas, Cayman Islands and the US Virgin Islands pulled out of the competition. Of the five nations to withdraw, three were represented on the Caribbean Football Union executive committee. A total of 25 teams participated in the qualifying phase.

| Seeding | Teams | No. of teams |
|---|---|---|
| No participation | Bahamas; Cayman Islands; Sint Maarten; Turks and Caicos Islands; U.S. Virgin Islands | 5 |
| First round entrants | Anguilla; Aruba; Barbados; Bermuda; British Virgin Islands; Curaçao; Dominica; Dominican Republic; French Guiana; Guyana; Haiti; Martinique; Montserrat; Puerto Rico; Saint Kitts and Nevis; Saint Lucia; Saint-Martin; Saint Vincent and the Grenadines; Suriname; Trinidad and Tobago | 20 |
| Second round entrants | Guadeloupe (runners-up in 2010); Cuba (third-place in 2010); Grenada (fourth-place in 2010) | 3 |
| Final round entrants | Antigua and Barbuda (hosts of final round); Jamaica (holders) | 2 |

== First round ==
Although a draw was originally made in March 2012, the Caribbean Football Union partner Digicel made changes to the original draw allowing only nations where Digicel services were available to host group games. At the time of the changes, the CFU's contract with Digicel had expired.

=== Group 1 ===
Held in Haiti.

| Team | Pld | W | D | L | GF | GA | GD | Pts |
|---|---|---|---|---|---|---|---|---|
| Haiti | 3 | 3 | 0 | 0 | 12 | 2 | +10 | 9 |
| Puerto Rico | 3 | 2 | 0 | 1 | 12 | 3 | +9 | 6 |
| Bermuda | 3 | 1 | 0 | 2 | 10 | 5 | +5 | 3 |
| Saint-Martin | 3 | 0 | 0 | 3 | 0 | 24 | −24 | 0 |

7 September 2012
17:00 UTC−4

| Bermuda | 1–2 | Puerto Rico |
|---|---|---|
| Russell 78' (pen.) | Report | Marrero 68'; Ramos 90+5' |

Stade Sylvio Cator, Port-au-Prince
Attendance: 2,000
Referee: Trevor Taylor (Barbados)
7 September 2012
19:00 UTC−4

| Haiti | 7–0 | Saint-Martin |
|---|---|---|
| Peguero 4', 40', 45'; Constant Jr. 22', 43'; Lafrance 70'; Maurice 90' | Report |

Stade Sylvio Cator, Port-au-Prince
Attendance: 10,000
Referee: Kevin Morrison (Jamaica)

9 September 2012
17:00 UTC−4

| Puerto Rico | 9–0 | Saint-Martin |
|---|---|---|
| Ramos 15', 44', 47', 82'; Delgado 29'; Arrieta 45+1'; Marrero 69', 83'; Oikkonen 76' | Report |

Stade Sylvio Cator, Port-au-Prince
Attendance: 2,000
Referee: Dwight Royal (Jamaica)
9 September 2012
19:00 UTC−4

| Haiti | 3–1 | Bermuda |
|---|---|---|
| Saurel 30'; Maurice 39'; Peguero 41' | Report | Russell 9' |

Stade Sylvio Cator, Port-au-Prince
Attendance: 10,500
Referee: Adrian Skeete (Barbados)

11 September 2012
17:00 UTC−4

| Saint-Martin | 0–8 | Bermuda |
|---|---|---|
| | Report | Burgess 18', 31', 49', 76'; Russell 52'; Manders 61'; Coke 80'; Simmons 87' |

Stade Sylvio Cator, Port-au-Prince
Attendance: 3,000
Referee: Dwight Royal (Jamaica)
11 September 2012
19:00 UTC−4

| Haiti | 2–1 | Puerto Rico |
|---|---|---|
| Peguero 65'; Maurice 67' | Report | Delgado 73' |

Stade Sylvio Cator, Port-au-Prince
Attendance: 12,000
Referee: Kevin Morrison (Jamaica)

=== Group 2 ===
Held in Saint Lucia.

| Team | Pld | W | D | L | GF | GA | GD | Pts |
|---|---|---|---|---|---|---|---|---|
| Guyana | 3 | 2 | 0 | 1 | 6 | 3 | +3 | 6 |
| Saint Vincent and the Grenadines | 3 | 2 | 0 | 1 | 6 | 2 | +4 | 6 |
| Saint Lucia | 3 | 2 | 0 | 1 | 6 | 4 | +2 | 6 |
| Curaçao | 3 | 0 | 0 | 3 | 2 | 11 | −9 | 0 |

Tiebreakers by head-to-head record:

| Team | Pld | W | D | L | GF | GA | GD | Pts |
|---|---|---|---|---|---|---|---|---|
| Guyana | 2 | 1 | 0 | 1 | 4 | 2 | +2 | 3 |
| Saint Vincent and the Grenadines | 2 | 1 | 0 | 1 | 2 | 2 | 0 | 3 |
| Saint Lucia | 2 | 1 | 0 | 1 | 1 | 3 | −2 | 3 |

21 October 2012
17:00 UTC−4

| Guyana | 1–2 | Saint Vincent and the Grenadines |
|---|---|---|
| Richardson 45+1' (pen.) | Report | M. Samuel 30'; Stewart 79' |

Beausejour Stadium, Gros Islet
Attendance: 1,000
Referee: Antonius Pinas (Suriname)
21 October 2012
19:30 UTC−4

| Saint Lucia | 5–1 | Curaçao |
|---|---|---|
| Paul 14'; Valcin 44'; Charles 51'; Charlemagne 87'; Frederick 90+2' | Report | Isenia 48' |

Beausejour Stadium, Gros Islet
Attendance: 1,650
Referee: Bryan Willett (Antigua and Barbuda)

23 October 2012
18:00 UTC−4

| Curaçao | 1–2 | Guyana |
|---|---|---|
| Nelson 53' (o.g.) | Report | Mills 1'; Richardson 42' (pen.) |

Beausejour Stadium, Gros Islet
Attendance: 750
Referee: Raymond Bogle (Jamaica)
23 October 2012
20:30 UTC−4

| Saint Lucia | 1–0 | Saint Vincent and the Grenadines |
|---|---|---|
| Paul 69' | Report |

Beausejour Stadium, Gros Islet
Attendance: 1,652
Referee: Sandy Vásquez (Dominican Republic)

25 October 2012
18:00 UTC−4

| Saint Vincent and the Grenadines | 4–0 | Curaçao |
|---|---|---|
| Stewart 8', 76'; Hamlet 58'; M. Samuel 78' | Report |

Beausejour Stadium, Gros Islet
Attendance: 852
Referee: Sandy Vásquez (Dominican Republic)
25 October 2012
20:30 UTC−4

| Saint Lucia | 0–3 | Guyana |
|---|---|---|
| | Report | Mills 14', 34'; Richardson 37' |

Beausejour Stadium, Gros Islet
Attendance: 2,500
Referee: Bryan Willett (Antigua and Barbuda)

=== Group 3 ===
Held in Martinique.

| Team | Pld | W | D | L | GF | GA | GD | Pts |
|---|---|---|---|---|---|---|---|---|
| Martinique | 3 | 2 | 1 | 0 | 23 | 2 | +21 | 7 |
| Suriname | 3 | 2 | 1 | 0 | 13 | 3 | +10 | 7 |
| Montserrat | 3 | 1 | 0 | 2 | 8 | 12 | −4 | 3 |
| British Virgin Islands | 3 | 0 | 0 | 3 | 0 | 27 | −27 | 0 |

5 September 2012
18:00 UTC−4

| Montserrat | 1–7 | Suriname |
|---|---|---|
| Allen 48' | Report | Waal 3', 11'; Sordam 16'; Vallei 39'; Drenthe 45'; Rijssel 85', 90+1' |

Stade Georges-Gratiant, Le Lamentin
Attendance: 188
Referee: Rudolph Angela (Aruba)
5 September 2012
20:00 UTC−4

| Martinique | 16–0 | British Virgin Islands |
|---|---|---|
| Delem 6', 68'; Gustan 12'; Parsemain 32', 63', 67', 70', 81', 86'; Mainge 37'; Dondon 41' (pen.); Abaul 46', 54'; Berdix 80' (pen.); Balmy 82'; Sidney 87' | Report |

Stade Georges-Gratiant, Le Lamentin
Attendance: 800
Referee: Javier Santos (Puerto Rico)

7 September 2012
18:00 UTC−4

| British Virgin Islands | 0–4 | Suriname |
|---|---|---|
| | Report | Rijssel 35', 42'; Drenthe 36'; Loswijk 81' |

Stade En Camée, Rivière-Pilote
Attendance: 200
Referee: William Anderson (Puerto Rico)
7 September 2012
20:00 UTC−4

| Martinique | 5–0 | Montserrat |
|---|---|---|
| Parsemain 5', 20', 59', 61'; Gustan 9' | Report |

Stade En Camée, Rivière-Pilote
Attendance: 400
Referee: Wilson Da Costa (Aruba)

9 September 2012
18:00 UTC−4

| British Virgin Islands | 0–7 | Montserrat |
|---|---|---|
| | Report | Campbell 35', 45+1'; Roach 45+3'; Woods-Garness 53'; Remy 71', 81'; Sargeant 88' (o.g.) |

Stade Pierre-Aliker, Fort-de-France
Attendance: 120
Referee: William Anderson (Puerto Rico)
9 September 2012
20:00 UTC−4

| Martinique | 2–2 | Suriname |
|---|---|---|
| Parsemain 3'; Mainge 22' | Report | Aloema 25' (pen.); Loswijk 90+2' |

Stade Pierre-Aliker, Fort-de-France
Attendance: 241
Referee: Rudolph Angela (Aruba)

=== Group 4 ===
Held in Barbados.

| Team | Pld | W | D | L | GF | GA | GD | Pts |
|---|---|---|---|---|---|---|---|---|
| Dominican Republic | 3 | 2 | 1 | 0 | 5 | 3 | +2 | 7 |
| Barbados | 3 | 2 | 0 | 1 | 3 | 2 | +1 | 6 |
| Dominica | 3 | 1 | 0 | 2 | 4 | 5 | −1 | 3 |
| Aruba | 3 | 0 | 1 | 2 | 5 | 7 | −2 | 1 |

23 September 2012
17:00 UTC−4

| Aruba | 2–2 | Dominican Republic |
|---|---|---|
| Baten 6'; Barradas 30' | Report | Ozuna 13', 76' |

Kensington Oval, Bridgetown
Attendance: 300
Referee: Stanley Lancaster (Guyana)
23 September 2012
19:00 UTC−4

| Barbados | 1–0 | Dominica |
|---|---|---|
| Williams 35' | Report |

Kensington Oval, Bridgetown
Attendance: 300
Referee: Neal Brizan (Trinidad and Tobago)

25 September 2012
17:00 UTC−4

| Dominica | 3–2 | Aruba |
|---|---|---|
| Bertrand 36'; Benjamin 45', 77' | Report | Bergen 40'; Gomez 55' |

Kensington Oval, Bridgetown
Attendance: 150
Referee: Leo Clarke (Saint Lucia)
25 September 2012
19:00 UTC−4

| Barbados | 0–1 | Dominican Republic |
|---|---|---|
| | Report | Núñez 80' |

Kensington Oval, Bridgetown
Attendance: 750
Referee: Jermain Elskamp (Suriname)

27 September 2012
17:00 UTC−4

| Dominican Republic | 2–1 | Dominica |
|---|---|---|
| Faña 66', 90+3' | Report | Langlais 39' |

Kensington Oval, Bridgetown
Attendance: 300
Referee: Neal Brizan (Trinidad and Tobago)
27 September 2012
19:00 UTC−4

| Barbados | 2–1 | Aruba |
|---|---|---|
| Skeete 21'; Harte 56' | Report | Bergen 32' |

Kensington Oval, Bridgetown
Attendance: 300
Referee: Stanley Lancaster (Guyana)

=== Group 5 ===
Held in Saint Kitts and Nevis.

| Team | Pld | W | D | L | GF | GA | GD | Pts |
|---|---|---|---|---|---|---|---|---|
| Trinidad and Tobago | 3 | 3 | 0 | 0 | 15 | 1 | +14 | 9 |
| French Guiana | 3 | 2 | 0 | 1 | 8 | 5 | +3 | 6 |
| Saint Kitts and Nevis | 3 | 1 | 0 | 2 | 2 | 4 | −2 | 3 |
| Anguilla | 3 | 0 | 0 | 3 | 1 | 16 | −15 | 0 |

10 October 2012
17:00 UTC−4

| French Guiana | 1–4 | Trinidad and Tobago |
|---|---|---|
| Darcheville 16' | Report | Hector 26'; Gay 35'; Daniel 72'; Plaza 87' |

Warner Park Sporting Complex, Basseterre
Attendance: 400
Referee: Marcos Brea (Cuba)
10 October 2012
19:00 UTC−4

| Saint Kitts and Nevis | 2–0 | Anguilla |
|---|---|---|
| Sawyers 15'; Harris 19' | Report |

Warner Park Sporting Complex, Basseterre
Attendance: 700
Referee: Sherwin Johnson (Guyana)

12 October 2012
17:00 UTC−4

| French Guiana | 4–1 | Anguilla |
|---|---|---|
| Pigrée 3', 45+1', 50'; Baal 74' | Report | Rogers 59' |

Warner Park Sporting Complex, Basseterre
Attendance: 600
Referee: Juan Carlos Hidalgo (Dominican Republic)
12 October 2012
19:00 UTC−4

| Saint Kitts and Nevis | 0–1 | Trinidad and Tobago |
|---|---|---|
| | Report | Carter 51' |

Warner Park Sporting Complex, Basseterre
Attendance: 1,700
Referee: David Rubalcaba (Cuba)

14 October 2012
17:00 UTC−4

| Trinidad and Tobago | 10–0 | Anguilla |
|---|---|---|
| Gay 7', 21', 32', 38'; Daniel 11', 35', 40'; Plaza 53', 63'; Teesdale 71' | Report |

Warner Park Sporting Complex, Basseterre
Attendance: 40
Referee: Sherwin Johnson (Guyana)
14 October 2012
19:00 UTC−4

| Saint Kitts and Nevis | 0–3 | French Guiana |
|---|---|---|
| | Report | Pigrée 7', 72'; Darcheville 8' |

Warner Park Sporting Complex, Basseterre
Attendance: 200
Referee: Marcos Brea (Cuba)

=== Ranking of second-placed teams ===
Originally, three positions in the final stage were available to teams who finish in second-place at the group stage. They were to be given to the team that finishes in a higher ranked position between the second-placed teams. The highest ranked second-placed teams between Group 1 and Group 2, Group 3 and Group 4, and Group 5 and Group 6 were to proceed to the final tournament.

However, due to the withdrawals of several nations the qualifying format was revised. Only the runners-up from Group 4 and Group 5 were ranked by the second-placed team format to decide which team progresses to the second round. Runners-up from Groups 1,2 and 3 automatically progressed to the second-round.

| Group | Team | Pld | W | D | L | GF | GA | GD | Pts |
|---|---|---|---|---|---|---|---|---|---|
| 5 | French Guiana | 3 | 2 | 0 | 1 | 8 | 5 | +3 | 6 |
| 4 | Barbados | 3 | 2 | 0 | 1 | 3 | 2 | +1 | 6 |

== Second round ==
Cuba (third place), Grenada (fourth place) and Guadeloupe (runner-up) have all received byes to the second round for their final position in the 2010 Caribbean Cup.

=== Group 6 ===
Held in Grenada.

| Team | Pld | W | D | L | GF | GA | GD | Pts |
|---|---|---|---|---|---|---|---|---|
| Haiti | 3 | 2 | 0 | 1 | 3 | 1 | +2 | 6 |
| French Guiana | 3 | 1 | 1 | 1 | 5 | 5 | 0 | 4 |
| Grenada | 3 | 1 | 1 | 1 | 3 | 4 | −1 | 4 |
| Guyana | 3 | 1 | 0 | 2 | 5 | 6 | −1 | 3 |

14 November 2012
18:00 UTC−4

| Haiti | 1–0 | Guyana |
|---|---|---|
| Saurel 47' | Report |

Grenada National Stadium, St. George's
Attendance: 1,000
Referee: Adrian Skeete (Barbados)
14 November 2012
20:00 UTC−4

| Grenada | 1–1 | French Guiana |
|---|---|---|
| Rocastle 33' | Report | Pigrée 90+2' |

Grenada National Stadium, St. George's
Attendance: 1,500
Referee: Javier Jauregui (Curaçao)

16 November 2012
18:00 UTC−4

| French Guiana | 1–0 | Haiti |
|---|---|---|
| Pigrée 55' | Report |

Grenada National Stadium, St. George's
Attendance: 750
Referee: Osiel Nuñez (Cuba)
16 November 2012
20:00 UTC−4

| Grenada | 2–1 | Guyana |
|---|---|---|
| Bain 46'; Murray 81' | Report | Wilson 48' |

Grenada National Stadium, St. George's
Attendance: 1,400
Referee: Neal Brizan (Trinidad and Tobago)

18 November 2012
18:00 UTC−4

| Guyana | 4–3 | French Guiana |
|---|---|---|
| Mills 12'; Moore 46'; Beveney 58', 87' (pen.) | Report | Ridel 34', 63'; Edwige 90+1' |

Grenada National Stadium, St. George's
Attendance: 1,500
Referee: Osiel Nuñez (Cuba)
18 November 2012
20:00 UTC−4

| Grenada | 0–2 | Haiti |
|---|---|---|
| | Report | Alcenat 36'; Straker 58' (o.g.) |

Grenada National Stadium, St. George's
Attendance: 3,000
Referee: Neal Brizan (Trinidad and Tobago)

=== Group 7 ===
Held in Guadeloupe.

| Team | Pld | W | D | L | GF | GA | GD | Pts |
|---|---|---|---|---|---|---|---|---|
| Dominican Republic | 3 | 2 | 1 | 0 | 6 | 2 | +4 | 7 |
| Martinique | 3 | 1 | 2 | 0 | 6 | 5 | +1 | 5 |
| Guadeloupe | 3 | 1 | 1 | 1 | 7 | 6 | +1 | 4 |
| Puerto Rico | 3 | 0 | 0 | 3 | 3 | 9 | −6 | 0 |

23 October 2012
18:00 UTC−4

| Martinique | 2–1 | Puerto Rico |
|---|---|---|
| Sabin 38' (pen.), 43' | Report | Ramos 55' |

Stade René Serge Nabajoth, Les Abymes
Attendance: 100
Referee: Ignatius Baptiste (Dominica)
23 October 2012
20:00 UTC−4

| Guadeloupe | 0–2 | Dominican Republic |
|---|---|---|
| | Report | Faña 45+1', 90+3' |

Stade René Serge Nabajoth, Les Abymes
Attendance: 1,505
Referee: Caswell Cambridge (Saint Vincent and the Grenadines)

25 October 2012
18:00 UTC−4

| Dominican Republic | 1–1 | Martinique |
|---|---|---|
| Peralta 45' | Report | Germany 71' |

Stade René Serge Nabajoth, Les Abymes
Attendance: 1,800
Referee: Collingham Delves (Saint Vincent and the Grenadines)
25 October 2012
20:00 UTC−4

| Guadeloupe | 4–1 | Puerto Rico |
|---|---|---|
| Loval 8'; Mocka 11', 26'; Pascal 69' | Report | Ramos 83' |

Stade René Serge Nabajoth, Les Abymes
Attendance: 1,500
Referee: Daniel Leslie (Dominica)

27 October 2012
17:00 UTC−4

| Puerto Rico | 1–3 | Dominican Republic |
|---|---|---|
| Vélez 80' | Report | Faña 19', 70'; Ulloa 86' |

Stade René Serge Nabajoth, Les Abymes
Attendance: 3,000
Referee: Caswell Cambridge (Saint Vincent and the Grenadines)
27 October 2012
19:00 UTC−4

| Guadeloupe | 3–3 | Martinique |
|---|---|---|
| Clavier 13', 33'; Pascal 74' | Report | Germany 17'; Gustan 24', 63' |

Stade René Serge Nabajoth, Les Abymes
Attendance: 2,891
Referee: Daniel Leslie (Dominica)

=== Group 8 ===
Held in Trinidad and Tobago.

| Team | Pld | W | D | L | GF | GA | GD | Pts |
|---|---|---|---|---|---|---|---|---|
| Trinidad and Tobago | 3 | 2 | 1 | 0 | 5 | 1 | +4 | 7 |
| Cuba | 3 | 1 | 1 | 1 | 6 | 2 | +4 | 4 |
| Suriname | 3 | 1 | 0 | 2 | 1 | 8 | −7 | 3 |
| Saint Vincent and the Grenadines | 3 | 0 | 2 | 1 | 2 | 3 | −1 | 2 |

14 November 2012
18:00 UTC−4

| Cuba | 5–0 | Suriname |
|---|---|---|
| Hernández 6', 36', 62', 89'; Martínez 46' | Report |

Dwight Yorke Stadium, Bacolet
Attendance: 200
Referee: Valman Bedeau (Grenada)
14 November 2012
20:00 UTC−4

| Trinidad and Tobago | 1–1 | Saint Vincent and the Grenadines |
|---|---|---|
| Jorsling 3' | Report | M. Samuel 24' |

Dwight Yorke Stadium, Bacolet
Attendance: 800
Referee: Courtney Campbell (Jamaica)

16 November 2012
18:00 UTC−4

| Saint Vincent and the Grenadines | 1–1 | Cuba |
|---|---|---|
| Stewart 8' | Report | Linares 48' |

Dwight Yorke Stadium, Bacolet
Attendance: 300
Referee: Trevor Taylor (Barbados)
16 November 2012
20:00 UTC−4

| Trinidad and Tobago | 3–0 | Suriname |
|---|---|---|
| Power 35'; Roy 50'; David 88' | Report |

Dwight Yorke Stadium, Bacolet
Attendance: 950
Referee: Alain Georges (Haiti)

18 November 2012
18:00 UTC−4

| Suriname | 1–0 | Saint Vincent and the Grenadines |
|---|---|---|
| Aloema 42' (pen.) | Report |

Dwight Yorke Stadium, Bacolet
Attendance: 200
Referee: Alain Georges (Haiti)
18 November 2012
20:00 UTC−4

| Trinidad and Tobago | 1–0 | Cuba |
|---|---|---|
| Guerra 67' | Report |

Dwight Yorke Stadium, Bacolet
Attendance: 1,300
Referee: Courtney Campbell (Jamaica)

== Goalscorers ==
11 goals

- (Martinique) Kévin Parsemain

7 goals

- (French Guiana) Gary Pigrée
- (Puerto Rico) Héctor Ramos

6 goals

- (Dominican Republic) Jonathan Faña

5 goals

- (Haiti) Jean-Philippe Peguero
- (Trinidad and Tobago) Jamal Gay

4 goals

- (Bermuda) Tyrell Burgess
- (Cuba) Marcel Hernández
- (Guyana) Vurlon Mills
- (Martinique) Steeve Gustan
- (Saint Vincent and the Grenadines) Cornelius Stewart
- (Suriname) Stefano Rijssel
- (Trinidad and Tobago) Keon Daniel

3 goals

- (Bermuda) Antwan Russell
- (Guyana) Gregory Richardson
- (Haiti) Jean-Eudes Maurice
- (Puerto Rico) Joseph Marrero
- (Saint Vincent and the Grenadines) Myron Samuel
- (Trinidad and Tobago) Willis Plaza

2 goals

- (Aruba) Jean-Luc Bergen
- (Dominica) Kurlson Benjamin
- (Dominican Republic) Erick Ozuna
- (French Guiana) Jean-Claude Darcheville
- (French Guiana) Stanley Ridel
- (Guadeloupe) Larry Clavier
- (Guadeloupe) Dominique Mocka
- (Guadeloupe) Vladimir Pascal
- (Guyana) Shawn Beveney
- (Haiti) Monuma Constant Jr.
- (Haiti) Olrish Saurel
- (Martinique) Stéphane Abaul
- (Martinique) Jordy Delem
- (Martinique) Gaël Germany
- (Martinique) Djenhaël Mainge
- (Martinique) Cédric Sabin
- (Montserrat) Marlon Campbell
- (Montserrat) Ellis Remy
- (Puerto Rico) Noah Delgado
- (Saint Lucia) Tremain Paul
- (Suriname) Ronny Aloema
- (Suriname) Giovanni Drenthe
- (Suriname) Donovan Loswijk
- (Suriname) Giovanni Waal

1 goal

- (Anguilla) Terrence Rogers
- (Aruba) Rensy Barradas
- (Aruba) Raymond Baten
- (Aruba) Frederick Gomez
- (Barbados) Mario Harte
- (Barbados) Barry Skeete
- (Barbados) Rashinda Williams
- (Bermuda) Ian Coke
- (Bermuda) Taurean Manders
- (Bermuda) Lejuan Simmons
- (Cuba) Roberto Linares
- (Cuba) Ariel Martínez
- (Curaçao) Christopher Isenia
- (Dominica) Chad Bertrand
- (Dominica) Lester Langlais
- (Dominican Republic) Pedro Antonio Núñez
- (Dominican Republic) Domingo Peralta
- (Dominican Republic) Gilberto Ulloa
- (French Guiana) Ludovic Baal
- (French Guiana) Marc Edwige
- (Grenada) Kithson Bain
- (Grenada) Clive Murray
- (Grenada) Craig Rocastle
- (Guadeloupe) Loïc Loval
- (Guyana) Walter Moore
- (Guyana) Daniel Wilson
- (Haiti) Jean Sony Alcenat
- (Haiti) Kevin Lafrance
- (Martinique) Alex Balmy
- (Martinique) Jacky Berdix
- (Martinique) Gérald Dondon
- (Martinique) Gaëtan Sidney
- (Montserrat) Kendall Allen
- (Montserrat) Bradley Woods-Garness
- (Montserrat) Darryl Roach
- (Puerto Rico) Cristian Arrieta
- (Puerto Rico) Alex Oikkonen
- (Puerto Rico) Marco Vélez
- (Saint Kitts and Nevis) Atiba Harris
- (Saint Kitts and Nevis) Romaine Sawyers
- (Saint Lucia) Tafari Charlemagne
- (Saint Lucia) Eden Charles
- (Saint Lucia) Kurt Frederick
- (Saint Lucia) Cliff Valcin
- (Saint Vincent and the Grenadines) Darren Hamlett
- (Suriname) Romano Sordam
- (Suriname) Jurmen Vallei
- (Trinidad and Tobago) Kevon Carter
- (Trinidad and Tobago) Aubrey David
- (Trinidad and Tobago) Ataullah Guerra
- (Trinidad and Tobago) Hughton Hector
- (Trinidad and Tobago) Devorn Jorsling
- (Trinidad and Tobago) Seon Power
- (Trinidad and Tobago) Richard Roy
- (Trinidad and Tobago) Sylvester Teesdale

Own goals

- (British Virgin Islands) Jamal Sargeant (scored for Montserrat)
- (Grenada) Anthony Straker (scored for Haiti)
- (Guyana) Colin Nelson (scored for Curaçao)
