= 2011–12 Bermudian Premier Division =

Bermudian Premier Division
- Season: 2011–12
- Matches: 45
- Goals: 172 (3.82 per match)
- Biggest home win: Hornets 5-1 Trojans; Zebras 6-2 Colts
- Biggest away win: Cougars 0-4 Hornets; Warriors 0-4 Rams
- Highest scoring: Rams 5-3 Zebras; Zebras 6-2 Colts

The 2011–12 Bermudian Premier Division is the 49th season of the highest competitive football league in Bermuda, which was founded in 1963. The competition will begin in October 2011 and end in March 2012. North Village Rams are the defending champions, having won their eighth league championship last season.

== Teams ==
Somerset Eagles and Devonshire Colts were relegated to the Bermuda First Division after finishing last season in ninth and tenth place, respectively. They were replaced by the top two clubs from the First Division, champions Somerset Trojans and runners-up Robin Hood FC.

Team	Based	Stadium
Boulevard Blazers	Hamilton	Bermuda Athletic Association Field
Dandy Town Hornets	Pembroke	Western Stars Sports Club Field
Devonshire Cougars	Devonshire	Devonshire Recreation Club Field
North Village Rams	Hamilton	Bernard Park Field
PHC Zebras	Southampton	Southampton Rangers Field
Robin Hood FC		Bermuda Athletic Association Field
St. David's Warriors	St. David's	St. David's Cricket Club Field
St. George’s Colts	St. George's	Wellington Oval Field
Somerset Trojans	Somerset	Somerset Cricket Club Field
Southampton Rangers	Southampton	Southampton Rangers Field

== League table ==
Pos	Team	Pld	W	D	L	GF	GA	GD	Pts	Qualification or relegation
1	Dandy Town Hornets (C)	18	13	1	4	49	26	+23	40	
2	North Village Rams	18	12	2	4	55	28	+27	38	
3	Devonshire Cougars	18	12	1	5	35	25	+10	37	
4	PHC Zebras	18	10	2	6	43	28	+15	32	
5	St. George’s Colts	18	9	2	7	38	35	+3	29	
6	Somerset Trojans	18	9	2	7	43	42	+1	29	
7	Robin Hood FC	18	6	2	10	22	29	−7	20	
8	Southampton Rangers	18	2	6	10	20	41	−21	12	
9	Boulevard Blazers (R)	18	3	3	12	20	48	−28	12	Relegation to First Division
10	St. David's Warriors (R)	18	1	5	12	18	41	−23	8	Relegation to First Division

(C) Champions; (R) Relegated

== Results ==
Home \ Away	BOU	DAN	COU	NOR	PHC	RBH	STD	STG	SOT	SOU
Boulevard Blazers		0–7		2–4	2–5			1–3	2–3	2–2
Dandy Town Hornets	2–3			3–2		2–0			5–1	1–0
Devonshire Cougars	2–0	0–4		3–5		2–1	4–1		1–0	4–1
North Village Rams			2–0		5–3	5–2		0–1		
PHC Zebras		3–2	3–0			1–0		6–2	3–0	1–2
Robin Hood FC	1–0						2–0		1–2	
St. David's Warriors	2–0	0–2		0–4	0–3	1–2				1–1
St. George’s Colts		2–3	0–1			0–3	1–1			5–2
Somerset Trojans				4–2	1–4		3–2	4–1		
Southampton Rangers				2–2		1–1		0–1	4–3	

Updated to match(es) played on 8 January 2012. Source: FIFA
Legend: Blue = home team win; Yellow = draw; Red = away team win.

== Top scorers ==
Rank	Scorer	Team	Goals
1	(Bermuda) Antwane Russell	PHC Zebras	19
2	(Bermuda) Jonathan Bean	Somerset Trojans	15
3	(Bermuda) Dion Stovell	Somerset Trojans	13
4	(Bermuda) Raymond Beach	Dandy Town Hornets	12
5	(Bermuda) Angelo Simmons	Dandy Town Hornets	11
6	(Bermuda) Jahron Dickinson	St George's Colts	9
6	(Bermuda) Kwame Steede	Devonshire Cougars	9
8	(Bermuda) Ralph Bean Jr.	North Village Rams	8
8	(Bermuda) Allan Douglas Jr.	St George's Colts	8
10	(Bermuda) Fiqre Crockwell	St David's Warriors	7
10	(Bermuda) David Outerbridge	Robin Hood FC	7
