= Jemeiko Jennings =

Bermudian footballer

Personal information
- Full name: Jemeiko Sykhi Jennings
- Date of birth: 15 September 1981 (age 45)
- Place of birth: Bermuda
- Position: Defender

Senior career*
Years	Team	Apps	(Gls)
2001–2014	North Village Rams		
2008	Bermuda Hogges	2	(0)

International career^{‡}
2004–2008	Bermuda	10	(0)
- * Club domestic league appearances and goals as of 22 December 2010 ‡ National team caps and goals as of 22 December 2010

Jemeiko Jennings (born 15 September 1981) is a Bermudian retired international footballer who played as a defender.

== Club career ==
Jennings played for local side North Village Rams and had a spell with the Bermuda Hogges in the USL Second Division in 2008.

He also played for Royal in the Island Soccer League.

== International career ==
He made his debut for Bermuda in a February 2004 friendly match against Trinidad and Tobago and earned a total of 10 caps, scoring 0 goals. He has represented his country in 1 FIFA World Cup qualification match.

His final international match was an August 2008 CONCACAF Gold Cup qualification match against the Cayman Islands.
