= Island League =

Island League may refer to:

- Island Soccer League
- Shikoku Island League
