= Kijuan Franks =

Bermudian footballer

Personal information
- Date of birth: 31 May 1981 (age 45)
- Place of birth: Bermuda
- Position: Defender

Team information
- Current team: Devonshire Cougars

Senior career*
Years	Team	Apps	(Gls)
2008–	Devonshire Cougars		

International career^{‡}
2007–2008	Bermuda	4	(0)
- * Club domestic league appearances and goals as of 22 December 2010 ‡ National team caps and goals as of 22 December 2010

Kijuan Franks (born 31 May 1981) is a Bermudian international footballer who plays club football for Devonshire Cougars, as a defender.

== Club career ==
Franks has played his entire club career for Devonshire Cougars. He also played for Kings in the six-a-side Island Soccer League.

== International career ==
He made his debut for Bermuda in a March 2007 friendly match against Canada and earned a total of four caps, scoring no goals. His final international match was an August 2008 CONCACAF Gold Cup qualification match against the Cayman Islands.
