= Ian Coke =

Bermudian footballer (born 1996)

Personal information
- Date of birth: 16 June 1996 (age 30)
- Place of birth: Hamilton, Bermuda
- Positions: Midfielder; forward

Team information
- Current team: Dandy Town Hornets

Senior career*
Years	Team	Apps	(Gls)
2007–2010	Boulevard Blazers		
2011–2012	Devonshire Colts		
2012–2014	Hamilton Parish		
2014–2017	Boulevard Blazers		
2017–	Dandy Town Hornets		

International career^{‡}
2012–	Bermuda	4	(3)
- * Club domestic league appearances and goals as of 15:00, 19 June 2017 (UTC) ‡ National team caps and goals as of 14:53, 19 June 2017 (UTC)

Ian Coke (born 16 June 1996) is a Bermudian footballer who plays for the Dandy Town Hornets of the Bermudian Premier Division and the Bermuda national team.

== Club career ==
Coke has played for Hamilton Parish. He has also played for the Devonshire Colts. He won the Young Player of the Year Award for the Bermudian First Division with the club in 2012. Coke transferred from Hamilton Parish to his boyhood club, Boulevard Blazers, in 2014. In his first season back with the club, he scored 22 league goals and helped the club with the first division title. He was named the MVP of the Bermudian Premier Division in 2017 after scoring 15 goals for Boulevard, tied for most in the league with Angelo Simmons of Dandy Town Hornets, after missing a chunk of the season to injury.

Coke has also played in the Island Soccer League and was selected as a member of the league's all-star team which competed against a representative team from the Major Indoor Soccer League in 2011. Coke scored a goal in the eventual 3–9 defeat.

In June 2017 Coke signed for fellow Bermudian club Dandy Town Hornets.

== International career ==
Coke was part of Bermuda's squad for 2009 CONCACAF U-20 Championship qualifying. He scored in a 2–0 victory over Puerto Rico in the group stage. Coke made his senior international debut on 7 September 2012 in a 2012 Caribbean Cup qualification match against Puerto Rico. His scored his first international goal four days later in a match against Saint Martin in the same competition. Coke had often found himself down the pecking order behind European-based players Nahki Wells, Rai Simons, and Jonte Smith.

== Career statistics ==
Score and result list Bermuda's goal tally first.

#	Date	Venue	Opponent	Score	Result	Competition
1	11 September 2012	Stade Sylvio Cator, Port-au-Prince, Haiti	Saint Martin	7–0	8–0	2012 Caribbean Cup qualification
2	10 June 2017	Kirani James Athletic Stadium, St. George's, Grenada	Grenada	1–0	2–0	Friendly
3	10 June 2017	Kirani James Athletic Stadium, St. George's, Grenada	Grenada	2–0	2–0	Friendly
Last updated 19 June 2017
