= Larry Clavier =

French footballer (born 1981)

Personal information
- Date of birth: 9 January 1981 (age 45)
- Place of birth: Bondy, France
- Height: 1.83 m (6 ft 0 in)
- Position: Midfielder

Team information
- Current team: Phare Petit-Canal

Senior career*
Years	Team	Apps	(Gls)
2000–2001	AS Le Moule		
2001–2004	RCF Paris B		
2002–2005	RCF Paris	10	(0)
2005–2007	Angers	25	(1)
2005–2007	Angers B	25	(1)
2008–2009	RCF Paris	19	(2)
2009–2010	F.C. Penafiel	14	(2)
2010–2011	Freamunde	10	(1)
2012	Dong Tam Long An FC		
2013	Ratchaburi	8	(0)
2014–2016	AS Le Moule		
2016–2018	CS Moulien		
2019–	Phare Petit-Canal		

International career
2009–2012	Guadeloupe	13	(2)
- * Club domestic league appearances and goals

Larry Clavier (born 9 January 1981) is a French footballer who plays as a midfielder for Phare Petit-Canal. He has represented the Guadeloupe national team at international level.

== Club career ==
Clavier was born in Bondy, France. He played for Portuguese side Freamunde and for Angers, helping them gain promotion from the Championnat National to Ligue 2 in the 2006–07 season.

On 4 April 2012, Clavier signed a contract with V-League side Dong Tam Long An FC.

== International career ==
Clavier was called up to the Guadeloupe national team for the 2009 CONCACAF Gold Cup.

== Career statistics ==
Scores and results list Guadeloupe's goal tally first.

No	Date	Venue	Opponent	Score	Result	Competition
1.	27 October 2012	Stade René Serge Nabajoth, Les Abymes, Guadeloupe	Martinique	1–0	3–3	2012 Caribbean Cup qualification
2.	27 October 2012	Stade René Serge Nabajoth, Les Abymes, Guadeloupe	Martinique	2–2	3–3	2012 Caribbean Cup qualification
