= Vladimir Pascal =

Haitian-Guadeloupean footballer (born 1992)

Personal information
- Full name: Vladimir John-Bachard Pascal
- Date of birth: May 27, 1992 (age 34)
- Place of birth: Léogâne, Haiti
- Height: 5 ft 8 in (1.73 m)
- Position: Midfielder

Team information
- Current team: CS Moulien

Senior career*
Years	Team	Apps	(Gls)
2008–2011	AS Dragon		
2012	J.S. Suresnes		(11)
2012–	CS Moulien		

International career^{‡}
2011	Guadeloupe U20	2	(1)
2012	Haiti U23	2	(0)
2010–	Guadeloupe	12	(10)
- * Club domestic league appearances and goals as of 3 January 2014 ‡ National team caps and goals as of 3 January 2014

Vladimir Pascal (born 27 May 1992, in Haiti) is a Haitian-Guadeloupean footballer who currently plays as a midfielder for CS Moulien of the Guadeloupe Division d'Honneur, the top division of the Guadeloupe football league system. He is also a member of the Guadeloupe national football team.

== Club career ==
Pascal played for AS Dragon in his native Guadeloupe between 2008 and 2011 when they were relegated from the top flight. For the 2010/2011 season, Pascal was the league's top goal scorer, scoring 22 goals. Following this campaign, Pascal traveled to metropolitan France and had unsuccessful trials with RC Lens and LB Châteauroux, both of Ligue 2. Pascal also previously had trials with other lower-division clubs in France and Cyprus. Pascal then played half a season for J. S. Suresnes, an amateur club in the Championnat Paris Ile-De-France of the Promotion d'Honneur, the ninth division of the French football league system, in the Paris region, scoring 11 goals. Subsequently, after not receiving a professional contract in France, he signed for CS Moulien and returned to the Guadeloupe Division d'Honneur.

In December 2013, Pascal was one of 23 players invited to the inaugural MLS Caribbean Combine, a joint venture between Major League Soccer and the Caribbean Football Union aiming to provide exposure for the region's best players in hopes of being selected in the 2014 MLS SuperDraft, as the two entities continued to build a stronger relationship.

== International career ==
Pascal made his debut for the Guadeloupe national football team in a friendly against St. Kitts and Nevis on 2 March 2010. He has since gone on to be part of the squad for the 2010 and 2012 Coupe de l'Outre-Mer and Guadeloupe's unsuccessful run during 2012 Caribbean Cup qualification. He scored his first international goal on 22 September 2012 against Saint Pierre and Miquelon during the 2012 Coupe de l'Outre-Mer, a football tournament for the overseas departments and territories of France. In 2012, Pascal represented Haiti, the nation of his birth, at the Under-23 level during their unsuccessful qualifying campaign for the 2012 Summer Olympics.

=== International goals ===
Scores and results list Guadeloupe's goal tally first.

#	Date	Venue	Opponent	Score	Result	Competition
1	8 September 2012	Stade de Saint-Jean, Saint-Jean, Saint Barthelemy	Saint Barthélemy	?–?	8–1	Friendly
2	8 September 2012	Stade de Saint-Jean, Saint-Jean, Saint Barthelemy	Saint Barthélemy	?–?	8–1	Friendly
3	8 September 2012	Stade de Saint-Jean, Saint-Jean, Saint Barthelemy	Saint Barthélemy	?–?	8–1	Friendly
4	22 September 2012	Stade de Montbauron, Versailles, France	Saint Pierre and Miquelon	9–0	13–0	2012 Coupe de l'Outre-Mer
5	22 September 2012	Stade de Montbauron, Versailles, France	Saint Pierre and Miquelon	10-0	13–0	2012 Coupe de l'Outre-Mer
6	22 September 2012	Stade de Montbauron, Versailles, France	Saint Pierre and Miquelon	13-0	13–0	2012 Coupe de l'Outre-Mer
7	24 September 2012	Stade Bauer, Saint-Ouen, Seine-Saint-Denis, France	French Guiana	3–2	4–2	2012 Coupe de l'Outre-Mer
8	29 September 2012	Stade de Michel Hidalgo, Saint-Gratien, France	Mayotte	1–0	1–0	2012 Coupe de l'Outre-Mer
9	25 October 2012	Stade Fiesque Duchesne, Baie-Mahault, Guadeloupe	Puerto Rico	4–0	4–1	2012 Caribbean Cup qualification
10	27 October 2012	Stade René Serge Nabajoth, Les Abymes, Guadeloupe	Martinique	3–2	3–3	2012 Caribbean Cup qualification
Last updated 3 January 2014
