= Anthony Angély =

Footballer (born 1990)

Personal information
- Full name: Anthony Fabrice Angély
- Date of birth: 21 March 1990 (age 36)
- Place of birth: Paris, France
- Height: 1.85 m (6 ft 1 in)
- Position: Forward

Team information
- Current team: ES Buxerolles

Senior career*
Years	Team	Apps	(Gls)
2008–2013	Essor-Préchotain		
2013–2016	Club Colonial		
2016	Royan Vaux Atlantique FC		
2016–2017	Poitiers		
2017–2018	Châteaubriant	22	(3)
2018–2019	Chauvigny	15	(2)
2019–2021	Châtellerault	3	(0)
2021–	ES Buxerolles		

International career
2012–2017	Martinique	19	(2)
- * Club domestic league appearances and goals

Anthony Fabrice Angély (born 21 March 1990) is a professional footballer who plays as a forward for Régional 1 club ES Buxerolles. Born in metropolitan France, he is a former Martinique international.

== Club career ==
Born in Paris, Angély played for Martiniquais sides Essor-Préchotain and Club Colonial for five and three years, respectively. He was the top scorer of the Martinique Championnat National in his final season with Club Colonial, but lost in the Coupe de la Martinique final, despite scoring. In 2016, Angély moved back to France to join Royan Vaux Atlantique FC. He would go on to play for Poitiers, Châteaubriant, Chauvigny, Châtellerault, and ES Buxerolles.

== International career ==
Angély made his international debut for Martinique in a 2–1 loss to Guadeloupe on 3 March 2012. He scored his first goal in a 3–1 win over French Guiana.

== Career statistics ==
=== International ===
As of matches played 9 July 2017.

National team	Year	Apps	Goals
Martinique	2012	10	1
Martinique	2013	0	0
Martinique	2014	7	1
Martinique	2015	1	0
Martinique	2016	0	0
Martinique	2017	1	0
Total		19	2

=== International goals ===
Scores and results list Martinique's goal tally first.

No	Date	Venue	Opponent	Score	Result	Competition
1.	12 December 2012	Sir Vivian Richards Stadium, Antigua, Antigua and Barbuda	French Guiana	3–0	3–1	2012 Caribbean Cup
1.	19 April 2014	Stade René Serge Nabajoth, Les Abymes, Guadeloupe	Guadeloupe	1–0	1–0	Friendly
