= Steeve Gustan =

French footballer (born 1985)

Personal information
- Date of birth: 26 January 1985 (age 41)
- Place of birth: Martinique
- Position: Forward

Team information
- Current team: ASPTT Champigny-sur-Marne

Youth career
- 2004–2006: FC Girondins de Bordeaux B

Senior career*
Years	Team	Apps	(Gls)
2006–2011	Club Franciscain		
2011–2012	CS Bélimois Lamentin		
2012–2013	Club Franciscain		
2013–2017	Golden Lion FC		
2017–	ASPTT Champigny-sur-Marne		

International career^{‡}
2008–	Martinique	28	(7)
- * Club domestic league appearances and goals as of 28 October 2012 ‡ National team caps and goals as of 28 October 2012

Steeve Gustan (born 26 January 1985) is a Martiniquais international footballer who plays for CS Bélimois Lamentin of the Martinique Promotion d'Honneur the second level of Martinique's football league system.

== Club career ==
Gustan was signed by FC Girondins de Bordeaux of France's Ligue 1 in 2004 and was part of the reserve squad. After two seasons with Bordeaux, Gustan returned to Martinique to play for Club Franciscain. After five seasons with the club, Gustan signed for CS Bélimois Lamentin, another Martiniquais club, in 2011.

== International career ==
Gustan made his international debut on 9 June 2008 in a friendly against French Guiana. He scored his first international goal on 26 September 2010 against New Caledonia in the 2010 Coupe de l'Outre-Mer.

== Career statistics ==
Scores and results list Martinique's goal tally first.

#	Date	Venue	Opponent	Score	Result	Competition
1	26 September 2010	Stade Henri Longuet, Viry-Châtillon, France	New Caledonia	2–0	4–0	2010 Coupe de l'Outre-Mer
2	5 September 2012	Stade Georges-Gratiant, Le Lamentin, Martinique	British Virgin Islands	2–0	16–0	2012 Caribbean Cup qualification
3	7 September 2012	Stade Georges-Gratiant, Le Lamentin, Martinique	Montserrat	2–0	5–0	2012 Caribbean Cup qualification
4	24 September 2012	Complexe Sportif Léo Lagrange, Corbeil-Essonnes, France	Tahiti	2–2	2–3	2012 Coupe de l'Outre-Mer
5	15 November 2012	Stade de Michel Hidalgo, Saint-Gratien, France	Réunion	2–1	2–2	2012 Coupe de l'Outre-Mer
6	27 October 2012	Stade René Serge Nabajoth, Les Abymes, Guadeloupe	Guadeloupe	2–1	3–3	2012 Caribbean Cup qualification
7	27 October 2012	Stade René Serge Nabajoth, Les Abymes, Guadeloupe	Guadeloupe	3–2	3–3	2012 Caribbean Cup qualification
Last updated 29 October 2012
