= 2012 Caribbean Cup =

Tournament details
- Host country: Antigua and Barbuda
- Dates: 7–16 December
- Teams: 8 (from 1 sub-confederation)
- Venues: 2 (in 2 host cities)

Final positions
- Champions: Cuba (1st title)
- Runners-up: Trinidad and Tobago
- Third place: Haiti
- Fourth place: Martinique

Tournament statistics
- Matches played: 16
- Goals scored: 29 (1.81 per match)
- Attendance: 6,350 (397 per match)
- Top scorer(s): Eight players (2 goals each)

The 2012 Caribbean Cup was the 17th edition of the Caribbean Cup, an international football competition for national teams of member nations affiliated with the Caribbean Football Union (CFU) of the CONCACAF region. The final stage was hosted by Antigua and Barbuda. The tournament determined the four Caribbean teams that qualified for the 2013 CONCACAF Gold Cup.

Originally the competition's final round was to be scheduled for June and July however it was delayed. The title was won by Cuba for the first time.

== Qualification ==
The first and second rounds were scheduled for August and September, and October respectively. The draw for the qualifying round was made in March 2012.

The following teams qualified:

- Antigua and Barbuda (Automatic qualification as host)
- Jamaica (Automatic qualification as title holders)
- Haiti (Qualification as Group 6 winners)
- French Guiana (Qualification as Group 6 runners-up)
- Dominican Republic (Qualification as Group 7 winners)
- Martinique (Qualification as Group 7 runners-up)
- Trinidad and Tobago (Qualification as Group 8 winners)
- Cuba (Qualification as Group 8 runners-up)

== Preparations ==
This is the first international tournament organised by the CFU since the corruption scandal. Prior to hosting the tournament, Paul "Chet" Greene, a former General Secretary of the Antigua and Barbuda Football Association raised concerns that Antigua's FA may not be able to afford to host the tournament and suggested that it would require state aid. It was the incumbent ABFA General Secretary Derrick Gordon that went on to become the President of the Caribbean Football Union and ultimately select the host nation. Greene stated, "Antigua [are] not necessarily in a position to give as [much] they normally would, I think government becomes the only option at this stage and a call for larger than usual attendances to allow the association to pay the bills." Greene also said that in the event of a grant from the CFU (via CONCACAF), the association would "still have a chunk of expenses to bear."

ABFA President Everton Gonsalves responded, "the value to football is not something that can be valued in dollars." CFU President Gordon Derrick stated that "Football is an expensive venture in all aspects; development comes at a cost so monies have to be spent." At the 2013 CFU Congress, Derrick Gordon stated that they could not come to an agreement with usual sponsors Digicel as they "couldn't agree on a deal in time for the Caribbean Cup, as Digicel's budget year had closed."

== Venues ==
Two venues have been chosen to host the tournament.

St. Johns	North Sound
Antigua Recreation Ground	Sir Vivian Richards Stadium
Capacity: 12,000	Capacity: 10,000
2012 Caribbean Cup (Antigua)

== Draw ==
Teams were allocated to this stage based on a fixed draw. The draw was decided thus:

Group A

- Host
- Group 6 winner
- Group 7 runners-up
- Group 8 winner

Group B

- Previous competition winner
- Group 6 runner-up
- Group 7 winner
- Group 8 runner-up

The result of the draw was amended on 19 November, the Group 7 runner-up was transferred to Group B and the Group 7 winner was transferred to Group A. As a result of the amendment Group A contains three qualifying group winners and the host, whilst Group B contains three qualifying group runners-up and the previous edition competition winner. Martinique, the team transferred to Group B containing no qualifying group-winners, is the only association in the competition with a CFU Executive Committee member (Maurice Victoire) besides hosts Antigua and Barbuda (Gordon Derrick).

== Group stage ==
The complete schedule for finals was released on 20 November.

Tiebreakers

1. Greater number of points in matches between the tied teams.
2. Greater goal difference in matches between the tied teams (if more than two teams finish equal on points).
3. Greater number of goals scored in matches among the tied teams (if more than two teams finish equal on points).
4. Greater goal difference in all group matches.
5. Greater number of goals scored in all group matches.
6. Drawing of lots.

All times local (UTC−4)

=== Group A ===
Team	Pld	W	D	L	GF	GA	GD	Pts
Haiti	3	2	1	0	5	2	+3	7
Trinidad and Tobago	3	2	1	0	5	3	+2	7
Dominican Republic	3	0	1	2	3	5	−2	1
Antigua and Barbuda	3	0	1	2	4	7	−3	1

7 December 2012
18:00

Haiti	1–1	Trinidad and Tobago
Saint-Preux 7'	Report	Carter 19'

Antigua Recreation Ground, St. John's
Attendance: 150
Referee: Valdin Legister (Jamaica)
7 December 2012
20:00

Antigua and Barbuda	2-2	Dominican Republic
Byers 17', 44'	Report	García 74'; Faña 90'

Antigua Recreation Ground, St. John's
Attendance: 150
Referee: Wilson da Costa (Bahamas)

9 December 2012
17:00

Dominican Republic	0–1	Haiti
	Report	Peguero 39'

Antigua Recreation Ground, St. John's
Attendance: 800
Referee: Elmer Bonilla (El Salvador)
9 December 2012
19:00

Antigua and Barbuda	1–2	Trinidad and Tobago
Byers 63'	Report	Molino 72', 89'

Antigua Recreation Ground, St. John's
Attendance: 2,000
Referee: David Rubalcaba (Cuba)

11 December 2012
17:00

Trinidad and Tobago	2–1	Dominican Republic
Carter 14'; Molino 70'	Report	Rodríguez 52'

Antigua Recreation Ground, St. John's
Attendance: 250
Referee: Kevin Thomas (Jamaica)
11 December 2012
19:00

Haiti	3–1	Antigua and Barbuda
Peguero 19'; Saint-Preux 21', 44'	Report	Byers 89'

Antigua Recreation Ground, St. John's
Attendance: 800
Referee: Marcos Brea (Cuba)

=== Group B ===
Team	Pld	W	D	L	GF	GA	GD	Pts
Martinique	3	2	1	0	4	1	+3	7
Cuba	3	2	0	1	3	2	+1	6
French Guiana	3	1	0	2	4	6	−2	3
Jamaica	3	0	1	2	1	3	−2	1

8 December 2012
18:00

Martinique	1–0	Cuba
Piquionne 29'	Report

Sir Vivian Richards Stadium, North Sound
Attendance: 100
Referee: Enrico Wijngaarde (Suriname)
8 December 2012
20:00

Jamaica	1–2	French Guiana
Stewart 22'	Report	Pigrée 19'; Evens 48'

Sir Vivian Richards Stadium, North Sound
Attendance: 100
Referee: Sandy Vásquez (Dominican Republic)

10 December 2012
17:00

Cuba	2–1	French Guiana
Martínez 74', 76'	Report	Pigrée 16'

Sir Vivian Richards Stadium, North Sound
Attendance: 225
Referee: William Anderson (Puerto Rico)
10 December 2012
19:00

Jamaica	0–0	Martinique
	Report

Sir Vivian Richards Stadium, North Sound
Attendance: 225
Referee: Sherwin Johnson (Guyana)

12 December 2012
17:00

French Guiana	1–3	Martinique
Darcheville 80'	Report	Piquionne 10'; Parsemain 33'; Angély 77'

Sir Vivian Richards Stadium, North Sound
Attendance: 100
Referee: Sandy Vásquez (Dominican Republic)
12 December 2012
19:00

Jamaica	0–1	Cuba
	Report	Urgellés 57'

Sir Vivian Richards Stadium, North Sound
Attendance: 200
Referee: Elmer Bonilla (El Salvador)

== Knockout phase ==
All teams that reach this phase qualified for the 2013 CONCACAF Gold Cup.

In case of tie, extra time is played, and if still tied, the match is decided by a penalty shoot-out.

Semi-finals
Haiti	0
Cuba	1
Martinique	1 (4)
Trinidad and Tobago	1 (5)

Final
Cuba	1
Trinidad and Tobago	0
Third place
Haiti	1
Martinique	0

=== Semi-finals ===
14 December 2012
17:00

Martinique	1–1 (a.e.t.)	Trinidad and Tobago
Parsemain 75'	Report	Roy 90'
Penalties
Berdix (penalty scored); Crétinoir (penalty scored); Gustan (penalty scored); Parsemain (penalty scored); Piquionne (penalty missed)	4–5	(penalty scored) Theobald; (penalty scored) Molino; (penalty scored) Mitchell; (penalty scored) Gonzales; (penalty scored) Guerra

Antigua Recreation Ground, St. John's
Attendance: 200
Referee: Elmer Bonilla (El Salvador)

14 December 2012
20:00

Haiti	0–1	Cuba
	Report	Colomé 8'

Antigua Recreation Ground, St. John's
Attendance: 200
Referee: Enrico Wijngaarde (Suriname)

=== Third place play-off ===
16 December 2012
14:00

Haiti	1–0 (a.e.t.)	Martinique
Saint-Preux 94'	Report

Antigua Recreation Ground, St. John's (Note: CFU released a statement on 14 December stating that the venue and kick-off time for the third place playoff and final had changed. They were originally scheduled to be played at the Sir Vivian Richards Stadium.)
Attendance: 100
Referee: Wilson da Costa (Bahamas)

=== Final ===
16 December 2012
17:00

Cuba	1–0 (a.e.t.)	Trinidad and Tobago
Hernández 113'	Report

Antigua Recreation Ground, St. John's
Attendance: 750
Referee: Valdin Legister (Jamaica)

2012 Caribbean Cup
winner

Cuba
First title

== Prize money ==
The winner received US $120k, the runner-up received US $85k, the third-place team received US $70k and the fourth-placed team received US $50K.

== Goalscorers ==
2 goals

- (Antigua and Barbuda) Peter Byers
- (Cuba) Ariel Martínez
- (Dominican Republic) Kerbi Rodríguez
- (French Guiana) Gary Pigrée
- (Haiti) Jean-Philippe Peguero
- (Haiti) Leonel Saint-Preux
- (Martinique) Kévin Parsemain
- (Martinique) Frédéric Piquionne

1 goal

- (Antigua and Barbuda) Quinton Griffith
- (Cuba) Yoel Colomé
- (Cuba) Aliannis Urgellés
- (Cuba) Marcel Hernández
- (Dominican Republic) Jonathan Faña
- (Dominican Republic) César García
- (French Guiana) Jean-Claude Darcheville
- (French Guiana) Rhudy Evens
- (Jamaica) Tremaine Stewart
- (Martinique) Anthony Angély
- (Trinidad and Tobago) Kevon Carter
- (Trinidad and Tobago) Kevin Molino
- (Trinidad and Tobago) Richard Roy
