= 2010–11 Bermudian Premier Division =

Bermudian Premier Division
- Season: 2010–11
- Champions: North Village Rams (8th title)
- Relegated: Somerset Eagles; Devonshire Colts
- CFU Club Championship: North Village Rams
- Matches: 90
- Goals: 318 (3.53 per match)
- Biggest home win: Rams 7-0 Warriors
- Biggest away win: D. Colts 0-5 Cougars
- Highest scoring: Blazers 4-4 D. Colts; Cougars 7-1 Warriors; Rams 7-1 Zebras
- Longest winning run: Rams (8 matches)
- Longest unbeaten run: Rams (8 matches)
- Longest winless run: D. Colts (7 matches)
- Longest losing run: D. Colts (6 matches)

The 2010-11 Bermudian Premier Division is the 48th season of the highest competitive football league in Bermuda, which was founded in 1963. Dandy Town Hornets are the defending champions, having won their fifth league championship last season.

== Teams ==
Hamilton Parish and Somerset Trojans were relegated to the Bermuda First Division after finishing last season in ninth and tenth place. They were replaced by the top two clubs from the First Division, St. David's Warriors and St. George's Colts.

Team	Based	Stadium
Boulevard Blazers	Hamilton	Bermuda Athletic Association Field
Dandy Town Hornets	Pembroke	Western Stars Sports Club Field
Devonshire Colts	Devonshire	Police Recreation Club Field
Devonshire Cougars	Devonshire	Devonshire Recreation Club Field
North Village Rams	Hamilton	Bernard Park Field
PHC Zebras	Southampton	Southampton Rangers Field
St. David's Warriors	St. David's	St. David's Cricket Club Field
St. George’s Colts	St. George's	Wellington Oval Field
Somerset Eagles	Somerset	White Hill Field 1
Southampton Rangers	Southampton	Southampton Rangers Field

=== Rams' Robinson and Zebras' Smith murdered ===
Just four days after the final round of matches, North Village Rams midfielder Randy Robinson was killed by gunfire. A month later, on 1 May, PHC Zebras striker Jason Smith was shot dead . Both players were only 22 years old.

== League table ==
Pos	Team	Pld	W	D	L	GF	GA	GD	Pts	Qualification or relegation
1	North Village Rams (C)	18	13	2	3	48	17	+31	41	2012 CFU Club Championship
2	PHC Zebras	18	13	1	4	37	25	+12	40	
3	Dandy Town Hornets	18	11	3	4	38	26	+12	36	
4	Devonshire Cougars	18	10	3	5	46	23	+23	33	
5	St. George's Colts	18	7	5	6	30	21	+9	26	
6	Southampton Rangers	18	7	0	11	24	30	−6	21	
7	Boulevard Blazers	18	5	5	8	27	37	−10	20	
8	St. David's Warriors	18	6	0	12	23	49	−26	18	
9	Somerset Eagles (R)	18	4	4	10	30	40	−10	16	Relegation to First Division
10	Devonshire Colts (R)	18	1	3	14	15	50	−35	6	Relegation to First Division

Source: FIFA
Rules for classification: 1) points; 2) goal difference; 3) number of goals scored.
(C) Champions; (R) Relegated

== Results ==
Home \ Away	BOU	DAN	COL	COU	NOR	PHC	STD	STG	SOE	SOU
Boulevard Blazers		1–1	4–4	1–2	1–2	0–4	2–3	2–1	2–3	2–1
Dandy Town Hornets	2–2		1–0	0–3	2–1	2–0	3–0	3–1	3–3	1–4
Devonshire Colts	0–3	1–3		0–5	0–0	0–3	0–2	1–1	0–2	0–3
Devonshire Cougars	1–1	3–0	2–3		0–1	3–0	7–1	1–3	3–1	3–1
North Village Rams	3–0	1–2	4–2	4–2		7–1	7–0	1–1	3–0	2–0
PHC Zebras	4–1	2–1	4–1	2–1	2–1		2–1	1–3	2–0	2–0
St. David's Warriors	5–1	1–2	2–1	2–4	1–3	0–2		0–3	2–1	2–0
St. George's Colts	1–1	1–4	4–1	1–1	0–1	0–1	4–0		3–0	1–0
Somerset Eagles	0–1	1–5	6–1	1–1	3–4	2–2	3–1	2–2		1–3
Southampton Rangers	0–2	1–3	1–0	1–4	0–3	2–3	4–0	1–0	2–1	

Source: FIFA
Legend: Blue = home team win; Yellow = draw; Red = away team win.

== Top scorers ==
Rank	Scorer	Team	Goals
1	(Bermuda) Raymond Beach	Dandy Town Hornets	13
1	(Bermuda) Kwame Steede	Devonshire Cougars	13
3	(Bermuda) Ralph Bean Jr.	North Village Rams	12
3	(Bermuda) Temiko Wilson	Boulevard Blazers	12
5	(Bermuda) Jason Lee	North Village Rams	10
6	(Bermuda) Jahron Dickinson	St. George's Colts	9
7	(Saint Kitts and Nevis) Seretse Cannonier	St David's Warriors	8
7	(Bermuda) Dennis Russell	Southampton Rangers	8
7	(Bermuda) Troy Tucker	Somerset Eagles	8
10	(Bermuda) Clay Darrell	St George's Colts	7
10	(Bermuda) Darrin Dowling	Somerset Eagles	7
10	(Bermuda) Aquino Grant	PHC Zebras	7

Ref:

=== Season awards ===
The nominees for the Player Of The Year were:

- Ralph Bean - North Village
- Damon Ming - Dandy Town
- Cecoy Robinson - PHC

Young Player of the Year

- Jason Lee - North Village
- Jahron Dickinson - St George’s
- Tumani Steede - Devonshire Cougars

Coach of the Year

- Shaun Goater - North Village
- Richard Todd - St George’s
- Kwame Steede - Devonshire Cougars
