= Gary Pigrée =

French Guianan footballer (born 1988)

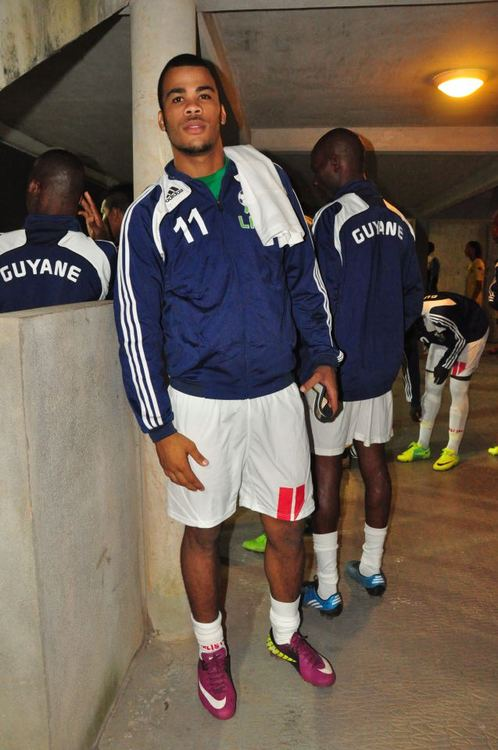

Personal information
- Full name: Gary Emmanuel Pigrée
- Date of birth: May 22, 1988 (age 38)
- Place of birth: French Guiana
- Position: Striker

Team information
- Current team: CSC Cayenne

Senior career*
Years	Team	Apps	(Gls)
2009–2014	AJ Saint-Georges		
2014–	CSC Cayenne	51	(52)

International career^{‡}
2012–2015	French Guiana	20	(16)
- * Club domestic league appearances and goals as of 6 July 2013 ‡ National team caps and goals as of 16:55, 3 February 2017 (UTC)

Gary Pigrée (born 22 May 1988) is a French Guianan footballer who currently plays as a striker for CSC Cayenne of the Promotion d'Honneur, the second division of the French Guiana football league system. He is also a member of the French Guiana national football team.

== Club career ==
Since 2009, Pigrée has played for AJ Saint-Georges in his native French Guiana. For the 2011/2012 season, he was the league's top scorer with 15 goals in 20 matches.

== International career ==
Pigrée made his international debut on 21 March 2012 in a friendly against Guyana. He has since been part of the squad for the 2012 Caribbean Cup and 2012 Coupe de l'Outre-Mer.

=== International goals ===
Scores and results list French Guiana's goal tally first, score column indicates score after each Pigrée goal.

List of international goals scored by Gary Pigrée
No.	Date	Venue	Opponent	Score	Result	Competition	Ref.
1	16 September 2012	Stade de Baduel, Cayenne, French Guiana	Haiti	1–2	1–2	Friendly	
2	26 September 2012	Parc des Sports, Saint-Ouen-l'Aumône, France	Saint Pierre and Miquelon	1–0	11–1	2012 Coupe de l'Outre-Mer	
3	26 September 2012	Parc des Sports, Saint-Ouen-l'Aumône, France	Saint Pierre and Miquelon	4–0	11–1	2012 Coupe de l'Outre-Mer	
4	26 September 2012	Parc des Sports, Saint-Ouen-l'Aumône, France	Saint Pierre and Miquelon	6–0	11–1	2012 Coupe de l'Outre-Mer	
5	26 September 2012	Parc des Sports, Saint-Ouen-l'Aumône, France	Saint Pierre and Miquelon	9–1	11–1	2012 Coupe de l'Outre-Mer	
6	26 September 2012	Parc des Sports, Saint-Ouen-l'Aumône, France	Saint Pierre and Miquelon	11–1	11–1	2012 Coupe de l'Outre-Mer	
7	12 October 2012	Warner Park Sporting Complex, Basseterre, Saint Kitts and Nevis	Anguilla	1–0	4–1	2012 Caribbean Cup qualifier	
8	12 October 2012	Warner Park Sporting Complex, Basseterre, Saint Kitts and Nevis	Anguilla	2–0	4–1	2012 Caribbean Cup qualifier	
9	12 October 2012	Warner Park Sporting Complex, Basseterre, Saint Kitts and Nevis	Anguilla	3–0	4–1	2012 Caribbean Cup qualifier	
10	14 October 2012	Warner Park Sporting Complex, Basseterre, Saint Kitts and Nevis	Saint Kitts and Nevis	1–0	3–0	2012 Caribbean Cup qualifier	
11	14 October 2012	Warner Park Sporting Complex, Basseterre, Saint Kitts and Nevis	Saint Kitts and Nevis	3–0	3–0	2012 Caribbean Cup qualifier	
12	14 November 2012	Grenada National Stadium, St. George's, Grenada	Grenada	1–1	1–1	2012 Caribbean Cup qualifier	
13	16 November 2012	Grenada National Stadium, St. George's, Grenada	Haiti	1–0	1–0	2012 Caribbean Cup qualifier	
14	8 December 2012	Sir Vivian Richards Stadium, North Sound, Antigua and Barbuda	Jamaica	1–0	2–1	2012 Caribbean Cup	
15	10 December 2012	Sir Vivian Richards Stadium, North Sound, Antigua and Barbuda	Cuba	1–0	1–2	2012 Caribbean Cup	
16	3 June 2014	Trinidad Stadium, Oranjestad, Aruba	Aruba	2–0	2–0	2014 Caribbean Cup qualifier	

== See also ==
- List of top international men's football goalscorers by country
