= Alex Oikkonen =

Puerto Rican footballer (born 1994)

Personal information
- Full name: Alex Kristopher Oikkonen
- Date of birth: 15 October 1994 (age 32)
- Place of birth: Joutseno, Finland
- Height: 1.83 m (6 ft 0 in)
- Position: Attacking midfielder

Team information
- Current team: OTP
- Number: 23

Youth career
- 2006–2008: Kultsu
- 2009–2010: IPS
- 2012–2013: FC Dallas

Senior career*
Years	Team	Apps	(Gls)
2011–2013	Bayamón		
2013–2014	Martos		
2014	MYPA	3	(0)
2014	→ Kultsu (loan)	18	(3)
2015–2017	Kultsu	26	(6)
2018	PEPO	21	(3)
2019	Kajaani	13	(0)
2020	North Shore United	1	(0)
2020	PEPO	10	(0)
2021–	OTP	5	(0)

International career^{‡}
2011–	Puerto Rico	11	(2)
- * Club domestic league appearances and goals as of 18:45, 11 June 2021 (UTC) ‡ National team caps and goals as of 18:45, 11 June 2021 (UTC)

Alex Kristopher Oikkonen (born 15 October 1994) is a Puerto Rican international footballer who plays as a midfielder for OTP.

== Early and personal life ==
Oikkonen was born in Joutseno, Finland. His father is Finnish and his mother is Puerto Rican.

== Club career ==
Oikkonen has played club football in Puerto Rico, Spain and Finland for Bayamón, Martos, MYPA and Kultsu.

== International career ==
He made his senior international debut for Puerto Rico in 2011, and has appeared in FIFA World Cup qualifying matches.

=== International goals ===
Scores and results list Puerto Rico's goal tally first.

No	Date	Venue	Opponent	Score	Result	Competition
1.	9 September 2012	Stade Sylvio Cator, Port-au-Prince, Haiti	Saint Vincent and the Grenadines	7–0	9–0	2012 Caribbean Cup qualification
2.	7 September 2014	Juan Ramón Loubriel Stadium, Bayamón, Puerto Rico	Grenada	2–1	2–2	2017 Caribbean Cup qualification
