= Marcel Hernández =

Cuban footballer (born 1989)

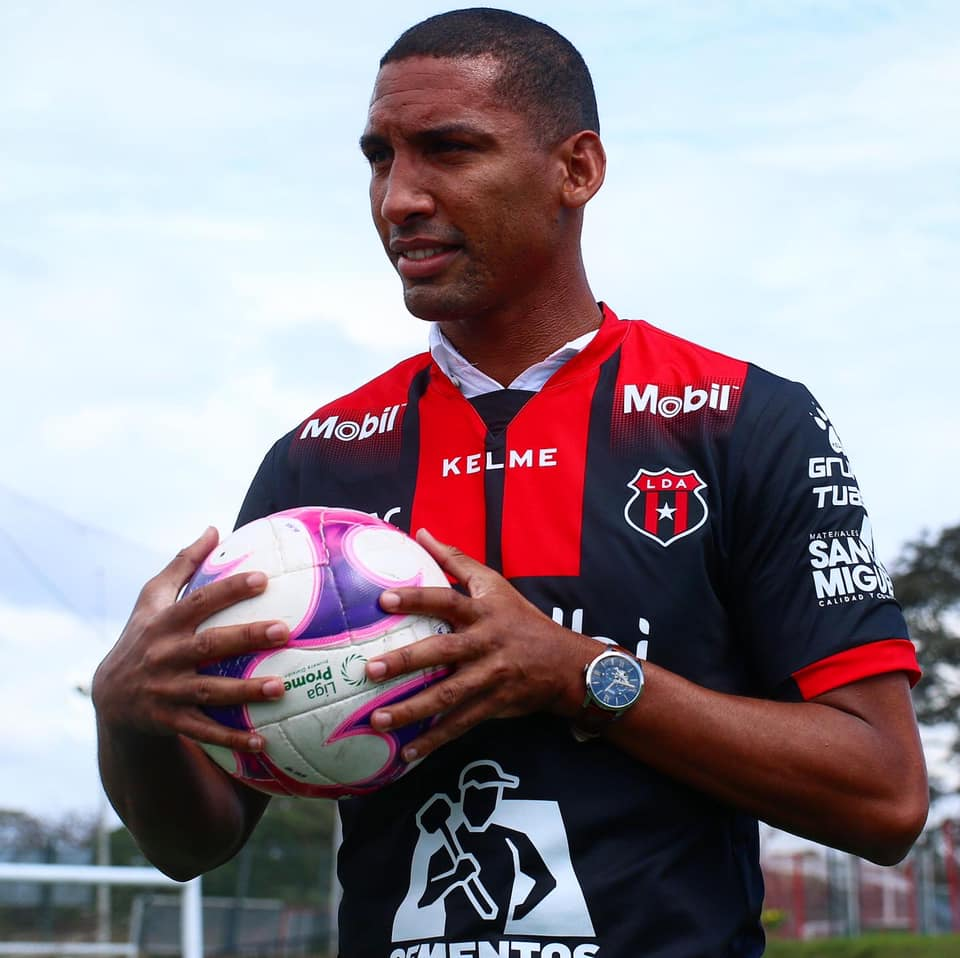
- Hernández with Liga Deportiva Alajuelense in 2021

Personal information
- Full name: Marcel Hernández Campanioni
- Date of birth: 11 July 1989 (age 37)
- Place of birth: Havana, Cuba
- Height: 1.84 m (6 ft 0 in)
- Position: Centre-forward

Team information
- Current team: Inter Santa Tecla
- Number: 2

Senior career*
Years	Team	Apps	(Gls)
2008–2012	Ciudad La Habana	25	(10)
2013-2015	La Habana		
2015–2016	Hoppers	12	(11)
2016–2017	Moca	16	(6)
2017–2018	Barcelona Atlético	14	(4)
2018	Cibao	13	(5)
2018–2021	Cartaginés	94	(59)
2021–2022	Alajuelense	51	(20)
2022	→ Cartaginés (loan)	24	(16)
2022–2024	Cartaginés	83	(35)
2024–2026	Herediano	76	(30)
2026-	Inter Santa Tecla	16	(2)

International career^{‡}
2010–	Cuba	25	(10)
2011	Cuba U23	2	(2)
Medal record
Representing Cuba
Caribbean Cup
Winner	2012 Antigua and Barbuda
- * Club domestic league appearances and goals ‡ National team caps and goals as of 27 March 2022

Marcel Hernández Campanioni (born 11 July 1989) is a Cuban professional footballer who plays as a centre-forward for Inter Santa Tecla and the Cuba national team.

== Club career ==
=== Barcelona Atlético ===
On 10 January 2017. Hernández signed with the new champion team of Liga Dominicana de Fútbol side Barcelona Atlético.

=== Cibao ===
Before failing to join the Football Superleague of Kosovo side Trepça'89, he joined Liga Dominicana de Fútbol side Cibao.

==== Failure to join with Trepça'89 ====
On 23 December 2017. Hernández joined Football Superleague of Kosovo side Trepça'89, but because of some bureaucratic problems it could not join with Trepça'89 even though it is registered by Football Federation of Kosovo as Trepça'89 player and it is expected that during the summer transfer window to join the team.

=== Costa Rica ===
After leaving Cibao, Hernández joined Cartaginés and stayed in Costa Rica for a number of years, also featuring for Alajuelense and Herediano. In 2022 he became the all-time leading foreign goalscorer in Liga FPD with 90 goals in his first 154 games, surpassing the record held for 15 years by Slovak forward Josef Miso. This record has since stretched to 166 goals in 309 appearances as of July 2026, making Hernández the sixth highest goalscorer of all time in the Costa Rican league. The Cuban has also been the league's top goalscorer in four separate seasons.

== International career ==
=== Under-23 ===
On 25 June 2011. Hernández making his debut with Cuba U23 in a 2012 CONCACAF Men's Pre-Olympic Tournament qualification match against Aruba U23 after being named in the starting line-up and scoring two goals during a 7–0 home win.

=== Senior ===
On 10 November 2010. Hernández made his debut with Cuba in a 2010 Caribbean Cup qualification match against Dominica after being named in the starting line-up and scoring one goal during a 4–2 home win. He represented his country in 4 FIFA World Cup qualification matches

On 6 November 2013, he announced his retirement from international football after not was named as part of the Cuba squad for 2013 CONCACAF Gold Cup.

Hernández reversed his retirement decision and played a further two matches in 2022, scoring twice in a 3-0 friendly win against Belize.

==== Senior international goals ====
Scores and results list Cuba's goal tally first.

No.	Date	Venue	Opponent	Score	Result	Competition
1.	10 November 2010	Antigua Recreation Ground, St. John's, Antigua and Barbuda	Dominica	4–1	4–2	2010 Caribbean Cup qualification
2.	26 May 2011	Estadio Pedro Marrero, Havana, Cuba	Nicaragua	1–1	1–1	Friendly
3.	28 May 2011	Estadio Pedro Marrero, Havana, Cuba	Nicaragua	1–0	2–1	Friendly
4.	14 November 2012	Dwight Yorke Stadium, Bacolet, Trinidad and Tobago	Suriname	1–0	5–0	2012 Caribbean Cup qualification
5.	14 November 2012	Dwight Yorke Stadium, Bacolet, Trinidad and Tobago	Suriname	2–0	5–0	2012 Caribbean Cup qualification
6.	14 November 2012	Dwight Yorke Stadium, Bacolet, Trinidad and Tobago	Suriname	4–0	5–0	2012 Caribbean Cup qualification
7.	14 November 2012	Dwight Yorke Stadium, Bacolet, Trinidad and Tobago	Suriname	5–0	5–0	2012 Caribbean Cup qualification
8.	16 December 2012	Antigua Recreation Ground, St. John's, Antigua and Barbuda	Trinidad and Tobago	1–0	1–0	2012 Caribbean Cup
9.	27 March 2022	FFB Stadium, Belmopan, Belize	Belize	1–0	3–0	Friendly
10.	27 March 2022	FFB Stadium, Belmopan, Belize	Belize	3–0	3–0	Friendly

== Honours ==
Alajuelense

- CONCACAF League: 2020

Cartaginés

- 2022 Liga FPD Clausura

Herediano

- 2024 Supercopa de Costa Rica

Cuba

- Caribbean Cup: 2012

Individual

- Liga FPD Top Scorer: Apertura 2020, Clausura 2022, Apertura 2024, Apertura 2025
