= Israel Blake Cantero =

Cuban footballer and manager

Personal information
- Full name: Antonio Israel Blake Cantero
- Date of birth: 9 May 1967 (age 59)
- Place of birth: Cienfuegos, Cuba
- Position: Defender

Senior career*
Years	Team	Apps	(Gls)
- Cienfuegos

International career
1997–1998	Cuba	3	(0)

Managerial career
- 2011: Cuba U-17
- 2011–2012: Cienfuegos
- 2012–2013: Haiti
- * Club domestic league appearances and goals

Antonio Israel Blake Cantero (born 9 May 1967) is a Cuban football manager and retired player for the Cuba national team.

== Playing career ==
=== International ===
As a player, he made his international debut for Cuba in an October 1997 friendly match against St Kitts and Nevis and represented his country at the 1998 CONCACAF Gold Cup.

== Managerial career ==
Blake was coach of the Cuba U-17 's during the 2011 CONCACAF Under-17 Championship and was named manager of the senior Haiti national football team in 2012, but was dismissed after the 2013 CONCACAF Gold Cup.
