= Kendall Allen =

Montserratian footballer

Personal information
- Date of birth: 2 June 1992 (age 34)
- Position: Defender

International career^{‡}
Years	Team	Apps	(Gls)
2011–2012	Montserrat	3	(1)
- ‡ National team caps and goals as of 26 June 2011

Kendall Allen (born 2 June 1992) is a Montserratian international footballer who plays as a defender.

== Career ==
Allen made his international debut for Montserrat on 15 June 2011, in a FIFA World Cup qualifier. He has three caps to date, all coming in FIFA World Cup qualifying matches.
