= Pedro Antonio Núñez =

Dominican footballer

Pedro Núñez
Personal information
- Full name: Pedro Antonio Núñez Mejía
- Date of birth: 5 September 1989 (age 37)
- Place of birth: Hato Mayor del Rey, Dominican Republic
- Height: 1.70 m (5 ft 7 in)
- Positions: Striker; winger

Team information
- Current team: Atlético Pantoja
- Number: 23

Youth career
- 2001–2002: San Cristóbal
- 2002–2004: Barcelona
- 2004–2006: Jàbac Terrassa
- 2006–2008: Terrassa

Senior career*
Years	Team	Apps	(Gls)
2008	Terrassa	2	(0)
2008	Virtus Calcio Poggibonsi		
2009	Gracciano		
2009–2012	Rubí	29	(3)
2012	UD San Lorenzo	4	(0)
2012	Tempête		
2013	Deportivo Pantoja		
2014	Bauger		
2015–	Atlético Pantoja	?	(1)

International career^{‡}
2012–	Dominican Republic	5	(1)
- * Club domestic league appearances and goals ‡ National team caps and goals as of 16 March 2017

Pedro Antonio Núñez Mejía (born 5 September 1989 in Hato Mayor del Rey) is a Dominican footballer who plays as a forward for CA Pantoja in the Liga Dominicana de Fútbol.
