= Frandy Montrévil =

Haitian footballer (born 1982)

Personal information
- Date of birth: January 14, 1982 (age 44)
- Place of birth: Cap-Haïtien, Haiti
- Height: 1.85 m (6 ft 1 in)
- Position: Goalkeeper

Senior career*
Years	Team	Apps	(Gls)
2000–2006	Zénith		
2006–2008	AS Capoise		
2010	Don Bosco		
2011–2013	Valencia		

International career
2006–2013	Haiti		
- * Club domestic league appearances and goals

Frandy Montrévil (born 14 January 1982) is a former Haitian footballer. He won the Ligue Haïtienne as well as its Ballon d'Or for best player with Valencia FC in Léogâne. He also played for the Haiti national football team. Montrévil retired in 2013.
