= Leonel Saint-Preux =

Haitian footballer (born 1985)

Léonel Saint-Preux
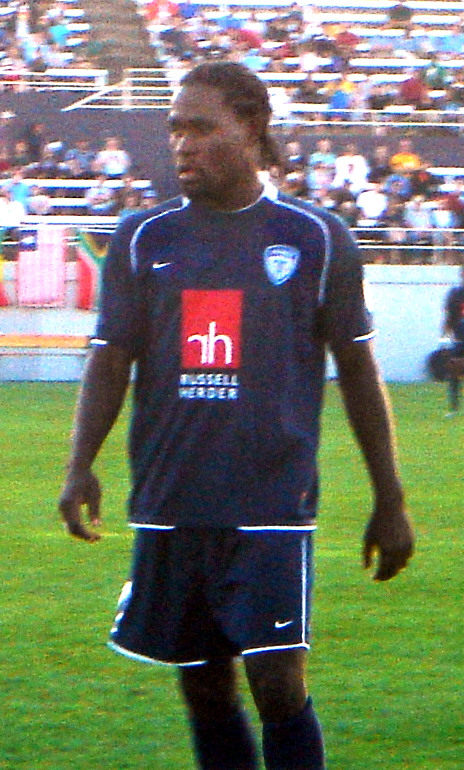
- Saint-Preux with Minnesota Thunder in 2009

Personal information
- Full name: Léonel Saint-Preux
- Date of birth: February 12, 1985 (age 41)
- Place of birth: Cap-Haïtien, Haiti
- Height: 5 ft 11 in (1.80 m)
- Position: Forward

Senior career*
Years	Team	Apps	(Gls)
2006–2009	Zénith		
2009–2010	Minnesota Thunder	23	(2)
2010	Austin Aztex		
2010–2013	Victory SC		
2013–2014	FELDA United	6	(1)
2014–2015	Azam FC		
2015–2016	Sheikh Jamal DC	15	(2)
2016–2018	Chittagong Abahani	10	(8)
2018–2019	Atlético Vega Real		
Total		54	(13)

International career
2007–2014	Haiti	47	(7)
- * Club domestic league appearances and goals

Léonel Saint-Preux (born February 12, 1985) is a Haitian former professional footballer who played as a forward.

== Club career ==
Saint-Preux began his career with Haitian club Zénith, where he was generally regarded as one of the most promising footballing talents in the Ligue Haïtienne.

Saint-Preux signed with Minnesota Thunder of the USL First Division on April 15, 2009., and scored on his debut on April 18, 2009, in a game against the Austin Aztex. He then spent an extended period with Vietnamies club based in Hanoi.

In early March 2010 he pre-signed a two-year contract with the Aztex, against whom he made his USL debut in 2009, but he was released before the season started after failing his medical.

== International career ==
Saint-Preux has represented Haiti at various youth levels. He was a member of Haiti's qualifying squad for the 2008 Beijing Olympics, scoring a memorable 40 yard goal in his nation's 2–1 victory over Canada. He debuted for the full Haitian national team in 2007, and has since participated in several World Cup qualifying matches. He scored his first international goal on November 19, 2008, in a 1–1 tie against Suriname.

== Career statistics ==
Scores and results list Haiti's goal tally first.

No	Date	Venue	Opponent	Score	Result	Competition
1.	24 November 2004	Independence Park, Kingston, Jamaica	U.S. Virgin Islands	4–0	11–0	2005 Caribbean Cup qualification
2.	19 November 2008	André Kamperveen Stadion, Paramaribo, Suriname	Suriname	1–0	1–1	2010 FIFA World Cup qualification
3.	23 May 2009	Lockhart Stadium, Fort Lauderdale, United States	Jamaica	2–1	2–2	Friendly
4.	27 June 2009	Saputo Stadium, Montreal, Canada	Syria	1–2	1–2	Friendly
5.	4 November 2010	Manny Ramjohn Stadium, Marabella, Trinidad and Tobago	Saint Vincent and the Grenadines	2–0	3–1	2010 Caribbean Cup qualification
6.	9 December 2012	Antigua Recreation Ground, St. Johns, Antigua and Barbuda	Dominican Republic	1–0	2–1	2012 Caribbean Cup
7.	16 December 2012	Sir Vivian Richards Stadium, North Sound, Antigua and Barbuda	Martinique	1–0	1–0	2012 Caribbean Cup

== Honours ==
Prix d'Honneur et d'Excellence -Association Jeunesse Excalibur/Global Youth Action Network, November 2008-
