= Kevin Lafrance =

Haitian footballer (born 1990)

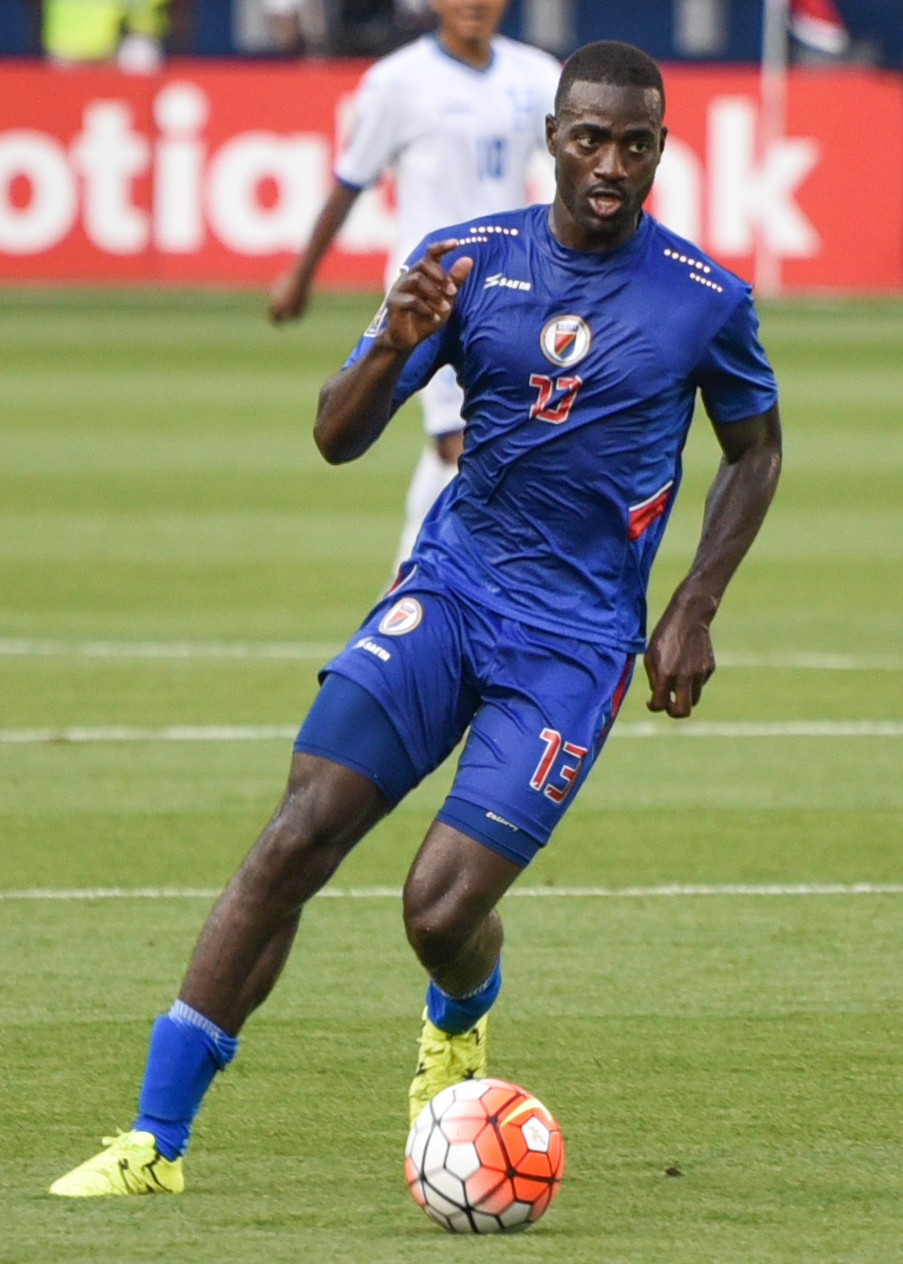
- Lafrance playing for Haiti in July 2015

Personal information
- Full name: Kevin Pierre Lafrance
- Date of birth: 13 January 1990 (age 36)
- Place of birth: Bondy, France
- Height: 1.86 m (6 ft 1 in)
- Position: Centre-back

Senior career*
Years	Team	Apps	(Gls)
2007–2013	Baník Most	60	(8)
2010	→ Slavia Prague (loan)	6	(0)
2011–2012	→ Viktoria Žižkov (loan)	15	(2)
2013–2014	Widzew Łódź	14	(2)
2014–2015	Miedź Legnica	25	(0)
2016	Chrobry Głogów	9	(3)
2016–2019	AEL Limassol	73	(12)
2019–2021	APOEL	0	(0)
2019–2020	→ Pafos (loan)	16	(1)
2021	AEK Larnaca	4	(0)
2021	Doxa Katokopias	9	(0)
2022	Stomil Olsztyn	12	(0)
2023	Molfetta	5	(0)
2023–2024	Polis Chrysochous	23	(3)

International career
2010–2021	Haiti	45	(5)
- * Club domestic league appearances and goals as of 10:55, 6 January 2025 (UTC)

Kevin Pierre Lafrance (born 13 January 1990) is a former professional footballer who played as a centre-back. Born in France, he played for the Haiti national team at international level.

== Club career ==
Born in Bondy, France, Lafrance played club football in the Czech Republic and Poland for Baník Most, Slavia Prague, Viktoria Žižkov and Widzew Łódź.

In June 2019 he signed for the Cypriot side APOEL. After a loan spell with Pafos, in January 2021 he moved to AEK Larnaca.

After playing with Doxa Katokopias, he signed for Stomil Olsztyn in February 2022.

== International career ==
He made his international debut for Haiti against Qatar on November 18, 2010.

=== International goals ===
Scores and results list Haiti's goal tally first.

No	Date	Venue	Opponent	Score	Result	Competition
1.	6 September 2011	Ergilio Hato Stadium, Willemstad, Curaçao	Curaçao	1–1	4–2	2014 FIFA World Cup qualification
2.	7 September 2012	Stade Sylvio Cator, Port-au-Prince, Haiti	Saint Martin	6–0	7–0	2012 Caribbean Cup qualification
3.	6 September 2016	Independence Park, Kingston, Jamaica	Jamaica	1–0	2–0	2018 FIFA World Cup qualification
4.	10 October 2017	International Stadium Yokohama, Yokohama, Japan	Japan	1–2	3–3	2017 Kirin Challenge Cup
5.	24 March 2019	Stade Sylvio Cator, Port-au-Prince, Haiti	Cuba	2–1	2–1	2019–20 CONCACAF Nations League qualification
