= Peguero Jean Philippe =

Haitian footballer (born 1981)

Personal information
- Date of birth: 29 September 1981 (age 45)
- Place of birth: Gonaïves, Haiti
- Height: 1.87 m (6 ft 2 in)
- Position: Forward

Senior career*
Years	Team	Apps	(Gls)
2002–2003	Don Bosco FC	23	(17)
2004–2006	Colorado Rapids	46	(14)
2006	New York Red Bulls	13	(8)
2006–2009	Brøndby IF	3	(2)
2008	→ San Jose Earthquakes (loan)	3	(0)
2011	Fort Lauderdale Strikers	9	(1)
2012–2015	Don Bosco FC	30	(20)
2015	Moca FC	?	(5)
2016–2017	Real Hope FA		

International career
2003–2013	Haiti	28	(16)
- * Club domestic league appearances and goals

Peguero Jean Philippe (born 29 September 1981), also known as Jean Philippe Peguero is a Haitian former professional footballer who played as a forward.

== Club career ==
Peguero began his career with Haitian club Don Bosco FC, with whom he won the 2003 haitian League, and was named MVP and received the Golden Boot Award with 13 goals. He moved to Major League Soccer in March 2004 to play for Colorado Rapids. Peguero finished his first season with the Rapids with seven goals and four assists in 18 games. In his second season, he scored seven goals and had six assists before the Rapids traded Peguero to New York Red Bulls in April 2006 for Thiago Martins The deal also included the Red Bulls sending to the Rapids first-round and third-round picks in the 2007 MLS SuperDraft. Peguero scored six goals in 12 games for New York, in addition to two goals in a friendly match against German team Bayern Munich.

In July 2006, Peguero transferred to Danish Superliga club Brøndby IF. On 5 August 2006, he scored a goal in his debut for Brøndby; the third goal in a 3–0 win over AC Horsens. In his third league game for Brøndby, against Viborg FF on 20 August, Peguero ruptured the anterior cruciate ligament and medial collateral ligament in his right knee as he scored Brøndby's third goal in the 3–0 win. It was estimated that his recovery would last seven to eight months, but Peguero would play no more games for Brøndby.

On 15 April 2008, Peguero briefly joined the San Jose Earthquakes on loan from Brøndby, but persistent problems with his knee forced an early end to the loan.

After over two years out of the game, Peguero resumed his career when he signed with Fort Lauderdale Strikers of the North American Soccer League in April 2011.

In 2012, he returned to the Haitian club Don Bosco FC, his first club.

In March 2015, Peguero signed with Moca FC in the Dominican Republic. He later joined Real Hope FA before retiring from professional football.

== International career ==
Peguero played nine games and scored seven goals for the Haiti national under-23 team. He made his full debut for the Haitian national team in a July 2003 friendly match against St Kitts & Nevis.

In March 2009, Peguero made a comeback for the national team, playing the last 16 minutes of a 4–0 friendly match loss to Panama. He was on the squad for the 2–2 draw against Jamaica, but did not play.

== Career statistiscs ==
=== International ===
Appearances and goals by national team and year
National team	Year	Apps	Goals
Haiti	2003	4	4
Haiti	2004	6	4
Haiti	2009	1	0
Haiti	2012	11	7
Haiti	2013	6	1
Total		28	16

Scores and results list Haiti's goal tally first, score column indicates score after each Philippe goal.

List of international goals scored by Peguero Jean Philippe
No.	Date	Venue	Opponent	Score	Result	Competition	Ref.
1	31 July 2003	Warner Park Sporting Complex, Basseterre, St Kitts and Nevis	Trinidad and Tobago	1-0	2-0	Friendly	
2	20 August 2003	Estadio José Pachencho Romero, Maracaibo, Venezuela	Venezuela	1-0	2-3	Friendly	
3	31 August 2003	Lockhart Stadium, Fort Lauderdale, United States of America	China	3-3	4-3	Friendly	
4	31 August 2003	Lockhart Stadium, Fort Lauderdale, United States of America	China	4-3	4-3	Friendly	
5	18 February 2004	Orange Bowl, Miami, United States of America	Turks and Caicos Islands	1-0	5-0	2006 FIFA World Cup qualification	
6	29 February 2004	Estadio Independencia, Estelí, Nicaragua	Nicaragua	1-0	1-1	Friendly	
7	12 May 2004	Robertson Stadium, Houston, United States of America	El Salvador	1-0	3-3	Friendly	
8	12 June 2004	Miami Orange Bowl, Miami, United States of America	Jamaica	1-1	1-1	2006 FIFA World Cup qualification	
9	7 September 2012	Stade Sylvio Cator, Port-au-Prince, Haiti	Saint-Martin	1-0	7-0	2012 Caribbean Cup qualification	
10	7 September 2012	Stade Sylvio Cator, Port-au-Prince, Haiti	Saint-Martin	3-0	7-0	2012 Caribbean Cup qualification	
11	7 September 2012	Stade Sylvio Cator, Port-au-Prince, Haiti	Saint-Martin	5-0	7-0	2012 Caribbean Cup qualification	
12	9 September 2012	Stade Sylvio Cator, Port-au-Prince, Haiti	Bermuda	3-1	3-1	2012 Caribbean Cup qualification	
13	11 September 2012	Stade Sylvio Cator, Port-au-Prince, Haiti	Puerto Rico	1-0	2-1	2012 Caribbean Cup qualification	
14	9 December 2012	Antigua Recreation Ground, St. John's, Antigua and Barbuda	Dominican Republic	2-1	2-1	2012 Caribbean Cup	
15	11 December 2012	Antigua Recreation Ground, St. John's, Antigua and Barbuda	Antigua and Barbuda	1-0	1-0	2012 Caribbean Cup	
16	11 June 2013	Estádio São Januário, Rio de Janeiro, Brazil	Italy	2-2	2-2	Friendly	

== Honours ==
Don Bosco

- Ligue Haïtienne: 2003 Ouverture, 2014 Clôture

Brøndby IF

- Royal League: 2006–07

Colorado Rapids

- Rocky Mountain Cup: 2005, 2006
