= Monuma Constant Jr. =

Haitian footballer (born 1982)

Personal information
- Date of birth: April 1, 1982 (age 44)
- Place of birth: Port-au-Prince, Haiti
- Position: Defensive midfielder

Team information
- Current team: CS Don Bosco

Senior career*
Years	Team	Apps	(Gls)
- Victory SC
- ASCAR
2007–2011	CS Don Bosco		
2012–2014	Racing Club Haïtien		
2015–	CS Don Bosco		

International career
2008–	Haiti	28	(2)
- * Club domestic league appearances and goals

Jean Junior Monuma Constant Jr. (born 1 April 1982) is a Haitian footballer who currently plays as a defensive midfielder for CS Don Bosco in the Ligue Haïtienne.

== Personal life ==
Constant Jr. is the son of Monuma Constant and Josette Nere and has a brother Fabio Testi Jr, who also played at Racing Club Haïtien before giving up football to pursue his studies. Constant Jr. is also the father to three children.

== International career ==
Constant Jr. made his national team debut on 15 October 2010 in a FIFA World Cup qualification match against Costa Rica in a 2–0 loss. Constant Jr. scored his first international goal in a 1–0 win over Qatar on 18 November 2010. He also played in the 2013 Gold Cup.

== Career statistics ==
=== International goals ===
#	Date	Venue	Opponent	Score	Result	Competition
1.	18 November 2010	Khalifa Stadium, Doha, Qatar	Qatar	0–1	Won	Friendly match
2.	2 September 2011	Stade Sylvio Cator, Port-au-Prince, Haiti	U.S. Virgin Islands	6–0	Won	2014 World Cup qual.
#	7 September 2012	Stade Sylvio Cator, Port-au-Prince, Haiti	Saint Martin	7–0	Won	2012 Caribbean Cup qual.
#	7 September 2012	Stade Sylvio Cator, Port-au-Prince, Haiti	Saint Martin	7–0	Won	2012 Caribbean Cup qual.
Correct as of 14 November 2015
