= Kevon Carter =

Trinidadian footballer (1983–2014)

- Carter with the Trinidad and Tobago national football team

Personal information
- Date of birth: 14 November 1983
- Place of birth: Trinidad and Tobago
- Date of death: 28 February 2014 (aged 30)
- Place of death: Port of Spain, Trinidad and Tobago
- Position: Forward

Senior career*
Years	Team	Apps	(Gls)
2004–2014	Defence Force	?	(41)

International career
2004–2013	Trinidad and Tobago	31	(5)
- * Club domestic league appearances and goals

Kevon Carter (14 November 1983 – 28 February 2014) was a Trinidadian professional soccer player who played as a forward for Defence Force and the Trinidad and Tobago national team.

== International career ==
Carter made his Trinidad and Tobago national team début in March 2004 against Guyana, and in April 2008 he scored his first international goal versus Grenada.

== Death ==
Carter died of a heart attack after feeling chest pains during a training session in the morning of 28 February 2014.

== Career statistics ==
Goal	Date	Opponent	Competition	Score	Final score
1	27 April 2008	Grenada	Friendly	2–0	2–0
2	21 July 2010	Antigua and Barbuda	Friendly	1–0	4–1
3	21 July 2010	Antigua and Barbuda	Friendly	3–1	4–1
4	12 October 2012	Saint Kitts and Nevis	2012 Caribbean Cup	1–0	1–0
5	11 December 2012	Dominican Republic	2012 Caribbean Cup	1–0	2–1

== See also ==
- List of association footballers who died while playing
