= Jean Sony Alcénat =

Haitian footballer (born 1986)

Jean Alcénat
Personal information
- Full name: Jean Sony Alcénat
- Date of birth: 23 January 1986 (age 40)
- Place of birth: Port-au-Prince, Haiti
- Height: 1.74 m (5 ft 9 in)
- Position: Right-back

Youth career
- 2000–2004: Aigle Noir

Senior career*
Years	Team	Apps	(Gls)
2004–2008	Aigle Noir	99	(14)
2009–2012	Leixões	60	(0)
2011–2012	→ Rio Ave (loan)	19	(0)
2012–2015	Petrolul Ploiești	74	(2)
2015–2016	Steaua București	7	(0)
2016	→ Voluntari (loan)	5	(0)
2016–2018	Feirense	49	(0)
2019	Ventspils	15	(0)
Total		328	(16)

International career
2006–2016	Haiti	67	(7)
- * Club domestic league appearances and goals

Jean Sony Alcénat (born 23 January 1986), nicknamed Tiga, is a Haitian former professional footballer who played as a right-back.

== Club career ==
=== Aigle Noir and Leixões ===
Alcénat was born in Port-au-Prince. In his country, he represented Aigle Noir AC. In January 2009 he moved to Portugal and signed for Leixões SC, making his Primeira Liga debut on 1 February in a 0–0 away draw against C.D. Nacional (one minute played) and finishing his first season with ten appearances – nine as a substitute – as the Matosinhos team finally ranked sixth, narrowly missing out on qualification to the UEFA Europa League.

Alcénat was much more regularly used in the 2009–10 campaign, but Leixões were relegated.

=== Rio Ave ===
In September 2011, Alcénat joined another club in the country, Rio Ave F.C. also of the top flight, making his debut on the 19th in a 2–3 home defeat to Sporting CP and being sent off in the 75th minute after two yellow cards. He played his second official game for the Vila do Conde side on 16 October, against U.D. Sousense in the third round of the Portuguese Cup, and again received his marching orders after a second bookable offence; both teams finished with nine players, in an eventual 5–2 win for hosts Rio Ave.

=== Romania ===
On 22 June 2012, Alcénat signed a two-year contract with Romanian team FC Petrolul Ploiești. Three years later, as his contract was due to expire and with his club facing insolvency, he joined FC Steaua București in the same the country.

=== Feirense ===
On 18 August 2016, Alcénat agreed to a two-year deal with Portugal's C.D. Feirense.

== Career statistics ==
=== Club ===
Appearances and goals by club, season and competition
Club	Season	League			National cup		League cup		Continental		Other		Total	
Club	Season	Division	Apps	Goals	Apps	Goals	Apps	Goals	Apps	Goals	Apps	Goals	Apps	Goals
Aigle Noir	2004–05	Ligue Haïtienne	11	1	–		–		–		–		11	1
Aigle Noir	2005–06	Ligue Haïtienne	22	0	–		–		–		–		22	0
Aigle Noir	2006–07	Ligue Haïtienne	25	2	–		–		–		–		25	2
Aigle Noir	2007–08	Ligue Haïtienne	28	7	–		–		–		–		28	7
Aigle Noir	2008–09	Ligue Haïtienne	13	4	–		–		–		–		13	4
Aigle Noir	Total		99	14	0	0	0	0	0	0	0	0	99	14
Leixões	2008–09	Primeira Liga	10	0	–		–		–		–		10	0
Leixões	2009–10	Primeira Liga	22	0	2	0	2	0	–		–		26	0
Leixões	2010–11	Liga de Honra	28	0	4	0	5	0	–		–		37	0
Leixões	Total		60	0	6	0	7	0	0	0	0	0	73	0
Rio Ave (loan)	2011–12	Primeira Liga	19	0	2	0	4	0	–		–		25	0
Petrolul Ploiești	2012–13	Liga I	16	1	4	0	–		–		–		20	1
Petrolul Ploiești	2013–14	Liga I	27	0	3	0	–		3	0	0	0	33	0
Petrolul Ploiești	2014–15	Liga I	31	1	4	0	0	0	6	0	–		41	1
Petrolul Ploiești	Total		74	2	11	0	0	0	9	0	0	0	94	2
Steaua București	2015–16	Liga I	7	0	0	0	0	0	4	0	0	0	11	0
Voluntari (loan)	2015–16	Liga I	5	0	–		–		–		–		5	0
Feirense	2016–17	Primeira Liga	21	0	2	0	4	0	–		–		27	0
Feirense	2017–18	Primeira Liga	28	0	2	0	2	0	–		–		32	0
Feirense	Total		49	0	4	0	6	0	0	0	0	0	59	0
Ventspils	2019	Latvian Higher League	15	0	–		–		6	0	–		21	0
Career total			328	16	23	0	17	0	19	0	0	0	387	16

=== International ===
Scores and results list Haiti's goal tally first, score column indicates score after each Alcénat goal.

List of international goals scored by Jean Sony Alcénat
No.	Date	Venue	Opponent	Score	Result	Competition
1	30 May 2007	Hasely Crawford, Port of Spain, Trinidad and Tobago	Saint Vincent and the Grenadines	1–0	3–0	Friendly
2	30 May 2007	Hasely Crawford, Port of Spain, Trinidad and Tobago	Saint Vincent and the Grenadines	2–0	3–0	Friendly
3	17 October 2007	Ricardo Saprissa Aymá, San José, Costa Rica	Costa Rica	1–1	1–1	Friendly
4	18 November 2012	National Stadium, St. George's, Grenada	Grenada	1–0	2–0	2012 Caribbean Cup qualification
5	8 October 2014	Sylvio Cator, Port-au-Prince, Haiti	French Guiana	2–1	2–2	2014 Caribbean Cup qualification
6	10 October 2014	Sylvio Cator, Port-au-Prince, Haiti	Barbados	4–2	4–2	2014 Caribbean Cup qualification
7	12 November 2014	Sports Complex, Montego Bay, Jamaica	Antigua and Barbuda	1–0	2–2	2014 Caribbean Cup

== Honours ==
Aigle Noir

- Ligue Haïtienne: 2006 F

Petrolul Ploiești

- Cupa României: 2012–13
