= Boulevard Blazers F.C. =

Association football club in Bermuda

- Full name: Boulevard Blazers Football Club
- Founded: 1973
- Ground: Goose Gosling Field, Hamilton, Bermuda
- Capacity: 700
- League: Bermudian First Division
- 2023–24: 5th
Home colours	Away colours

Boulevard Blazers F.C. is a football club based in Pembroke Parish, Bermuda, who currently play in the Bermudian Premier Division.

== History ==
The club, also named Boulevard Community Club, has won the Bermudian league title twice.

Blazers were relegated from the top tier in March 2012 and only returned to the Bermudian Premier Division for the 2015/16 season after beating Somerset Eagles to claim the First Division title in March 2015.

== Players ==
=== Current squad ===
- For 2015–2016 season

Note: Flags indicate national team as defined under FIFA eligibility rules; some limited exceptions apply. Players may hold more than one non-FIFA nationality.

No.	Pos.	Nation	Player
—	GK	(Bermuda) BER	Daniel Adams
—	GK	(Bermuda) BER	Deaz Chambers
—	DF	(Bermuda) BER	Jahleel Crockwell
—	DF	(Bermuda) BER	Aaron Foggo
—	DF	(Bermuda) BER	Ijahmon Mallory
—	DF	(Bermuda) BER	Zico Stovell
—	DF	(Bermuda) BER	Maquel Tankard
—	DF	(Bermuda) BER	Conneko Trott
—	DF	(Bermuda) BER	Jakio Williams
—	MF	(Bermuda) BER	Keemo Smith
—	MF	(Bermuda) BER	Niko Smith
—	MF	(Bermuda) BER	Dunn-ya Taylor

No.	Pos.	Nation	Player
—	MF	(Bermuda) BER	Ernest Trott
—	FW	(Bermuda) BER	Ian Coke
—	FW	(Bermuda) BER	TiaeVince Douglas
—	FW	(Bermuda) BER	Sergio Robinson
—	FW	(Bermuda) BER	Aldonte Smith
—	FW	(Bermuda) BER	Mark Smith
—	FW	(Bermuda) BER	Makai Young
—		(Bermuda) BER	Keimo Bean
—		(Bermuda) BER	Teron Butterfield
—		(Bermuda) BER	Antoine Famous
—		(Bermuda) BER	Sanjay Fostin
—		(Bermuda) BER	Dakarai Smith

== Historical list of coaches ==
- (Bermuda) Andrew Bascome (Sep 2009-)
- (Bermuda) Derrick Bean (Aug 2012–)
- (Bermuda) Aaron Williams (2013- Mar 2015)
- (Bermuda) Keemo Smith (Aug 2015–present)

== Honours ==
- Bermudian Premier Division: 2

1990–91, 1994–95
