= Olrish Saurel =

Haitian football player (born 1985)

Personal information
- Date of birth: 13 September 1985 (age 41)
- Place of birth: Cap-Haïtien, Haiti
- Position: Defender

Senior career*
Years	Team	Apps	(Gls)
2007–2010	Don Bosco (Pétion-Ville)		
2011	Chainat Hornbill		
- Victory SC
2012–2013	Don Bosco (Pétion-Ville)		
2013	Antigua Barracuda		
2015–2016	Sidama Coffee		
2017–2018	Dire Dawa		

International career
2007-	Haiti	20	(2)
- * Club domestic league appearances and goals

Olrish Saurel (born 13 September 1985) is a Haitian footballer who is last known to have played as a defender for Dire Dawa. Besides Haiti, he has played in Thailand and Ethiopia.

== Club career ==
Saurel started his career with Haitian side Don Bosco (Pétion-Ville). After that, he signed for Chainat Hornbill in Thailand. After that, he returned to Don Bosco (Pétion-Ville).

In 2013, Saurel signed for Antiguan club Antigua Barracuda. After that, he signed for Sidama Coffee in Ethiopia.

== International career ==
He is a former Haiti international. He scored as Haiti came back from 2–0 down to draw 2–2 with Italy which was seen as a schock result.
