= Island Soccer League =

- Founded: 2006
- Country: Bermuda
- Confederation: Bermuda Football Association
- Divisions: 2
- Number of clubs: 8
- Level on pyramid: 3
- Promotion to: None
- Relegation to: None
- Current champions: Union (2009)
- Broadcaster(s): Bermudasportsnetwork.com
- Website: Official website

The Island Soccer League is a professional six-a-side association football (also known as 'soccer') league based in Bermuda. The league is the brainchild of Bermuda soccer legend David Bascome, who founded the program in 2006. The league started play in 2007.

== Style of play ==
Essentially a football league, the league plays with a modified code, adopting rules from indoor soccer and the traditional sport. All matches are played at the Bermuda National Stadium with a reduced pitch size.

Players for each team are selected through an American-style draft system.

== Teams ==
The premier league is known as the Cellular One Adult league.

All teams play at the National Stadium in Hamilton.

Team	Logo
Red
Arsenal	
Kings	
Royal	
Union	
Blue
Apex	
Knights	
Storm	
Titans	

== ISL Championships ==
Season	Date	Champion	Score	Runner-up
2007				
2008		Kings		
2009	6/25/09	Union	8–6	Storm
