= Stade René Serge Nabajoth =

Multi-use stadium in Les Abymes, Guadeloupe

Coordinates: 16°16′09″N 61°30′30″W

Stade René Serge Nabajoth is a multi-use stadium in Les Abymes, Guadeloupe. It is currently used mostly for football matches. The stadium holds 7,500 people. It is currently the home ground of the Guadeloupe national football team.

René-Serge Nabajoth was a past mayor of the commune of Les Abymes.
