= Bascom (name) =

Bascom is both a surname and a given name. Notable people with the name include:

Surname:

- Bernadette Bascom (born 1962), American R&B singer, actress
- Earl W. Bascom (1906–1995), American-Canadian artist, inventor, rodeo cowboy, Mormon Bishop
- Elva Bascom (1870–1944), librarian, school teacher, editor for the American Library Association
- Emma Curtiss Bascom (1828–1916), American educator, suffragist and reformer
- Florence Bascom (1862–1945), American geologist
- George Nicholas Bascom (1837–1862), U.S. Army officer who arrested Chief Cochise, igniting the Apache Wars
- Henry Bidleman Bascom (1796–1850), American religious leader, Congressional Chaplain, Methodist Bishop
- Jeremy Bascom (born 1981), Guyanese sprinter
- John Bascom (1827–1911), American educator, author, President of the University of Wisconsin
- John L. Bascom (1860–1950), American lawyer, Iowa state legislator
- John U. Bascom (1925–2013), American surgeon and researcher
- Julia Bascom, American autism rights activist
- Kerry Bascom (born c. 1968), American retired professional women's basketball player
- Marion C. Bascom (1925–2012), American religious leader, civil-rights activist
- Oliver Bascom (1815–1869), American businessman, Erie Canal Commissioner
- Rose Bascom (1922–1993), Native American Hollywood actress, rodeo performer, hall of fame inductee
- Rose Flanders Bascom (1880–1915), America's first female lion tamer
- Ruth Bascom (1926–2010), American politician, mayor of Eugene, Oregon
- Ruth Henshaw Bascom (1772–1848), American folk artist
- Willard Bascom (1916–2000), American engineer, oceanographer, underwater archaeologist
- William Bascom (1912–1981), American anthropologist, folklorist, ethnologist

Given name:

- Bascom Sine Deaver (1882–1944), U.S. Federal judge
- Bascom Sine Deaver Jr. (born 1930), American physicist, professor
- Bascom Giles (1900–1993), American, Texas land commissioner
- Bascom Ray Lakin (1901–1984), American evangelical preacher
- Bascom Lamar Lunsford (1882–1973), American folklorist, musician, author of song "Good Old Mountain Dew"
- Bascom Joseph Rowlett (1886–1947), American architect
- Bascom N. Timmons (1890–1987), American newspaperman

Middle name:

- John Bascom Crenshaw (1861–1942), American college athletic director, founder of Georgia Tech's lacrosse team
- Asbury Bascom Davidson (1855–1920), American lawyer, Lt. Governor of Texas
- Harold Bascom Durham Jr. (1942–1967), American recipient of the Medal of Honor during the Vietnam War
- Norchad Bascom Omier Rojas (born 2001), Nicaraguan basketball player.
- Campbell Bascom Slemp (1870–1943), American Congressman, secretary to President Calvin Coolidge
- George Bascom Sparkman (1855–1896), American lawyer, mayor of Tampa, Florida
- George Bascom Sparkman Jr. (1886–1924), American football player and coach
- Henry Bascom Steagall (1873–1843), American politician
- Lester Bascom Wikoff (1893–1978), American educator, Rotarian
- John Bascom Wolfe (1904–1988), American psychologist
- Ashley Bascom Wright (1841–1897), American politician

== See also ==
- Bascomb
- Bascombe
- Bascome
- Baskcomb
- Boscombe
