= List of public art in Cambridgeshire =

This is a list of public art in the Cambridgeshire county of England. This list applies only to works of public art on permanent display in an outdoor public space. For example, this does not include artworks in museums.

== Babraham ==
Image	Title / subject	Location and coordinates	Date	Artist / designer	Type	Material	Dimensions	Designation	Wikidata	Notes
More images	Jonas Webb	High Street, Babraham, Cambridgeshire	Late 19th century	Carlo Marochetti	Statue on pedestal	Bronze and stone		Grade II	Q26616046	

== Cambridge ==
Image	Title / subject	Location and coordinates	Date	Artist / designer	Type	Material	Dimensions	Designation	Wikidata	Notes
More images	William Pitt the Younger	Pembroke College, Cambridge	1819	Richard Westmacott	Statue on pedestal					
	Bears	Exterior of Sedgwick Museum of Earth Sciences	1904	Unknown	Sculptures	Stone				
More images	Cambridge War Memorial	Hills Road 52.195065°N 0.131055°E	1922	Robert Tait McKenzie	Statue on pedestal	Bronze, brick and stone		Grade II listed	Q26558679	
	Guildhall Doors	The Guildhall, Market Square	1933	Laurence Bradshaw	Doors with 10 relief panels	Bronze				
	Crocodile	Wall of Mond Building, off Free School Lane	1933	Eric Gill	Motif	Incised brickwork				
More images	Talos	Guildhall Street, Cambridge	c.1960, installed 1973	Michael Ayrton	Sculpture on pedestal	Bronze and stone				
	Ceres - Goddess of Corn	CB1, Mill Park	1962	William Bloye	Sculpture	Bronze				
	Kett's Oak	Exterior of Kett House, corner of Station Rd. & Hills Rd.	1963	Willi Soukop	Bas-relief	Sandstone				
More images	Four-Square (Walk Through)	Churchill College, Cambridge	1966	Barbara Hepworth	Abstract sculpture	Bronze			Q60786074	
	The Swimmers	Mill Road by Parkside Swimming Pool	1966	Betty Rea, completed by John W Mills	Statue group	Bronze				
	Construction in Aluminium	Outside Engineering Department, Trumpington St.	1967	Kenneth Martin	Abstract sculpture on pedestal	Aluminium and Portland stone				
More images	Two Forms (Divided Circle)	Fellows' Garden, Clare College, Cambridge	1969	Barbara Hepworth	Abstract sculpture	Bronze	237 x 234 x 54cm		Q7858962	
More images	Chauvinist	Hills Road / Brooklands Road, Cambridge	1990	Helaine Blumenfeld	Abstract sculpture	Granite				
	Crystalline design	Crystallographic Data Centre, Union Road	1992	Eric Sorenson (architect)	Mosaic	Glass				
	A Pattern of Life	Fellows' Garden, Christ's College	2001	Tim Harrisson	Abstract sculpture	Portland limestone				
	Earthbound: Plant	Haddon Library & Sedgwick Museum	2003	Antony Gormley	Sculpture	Cast iron				A statue upside-down below ground with only the feet showing
	Flame	Clare Hall, Herschel Road	2004	Helaine Blumenfeld	Abstract sculpture	Bronze				
	DNA Double Helix	Memorial Court, Clare College	2005	Charles Jencks	Abstract structure	Aluminium				
	Confucius	Clare College Avenue	2006	Wu Wei-Shan	Sculpture	Bronze				
	Grasshopper	The Greshams, Gonville Place	2006	Matthew Lane Sanderson	Sculpture	Steel				
	Two Elements Uniting to Form a Contract	County Court Building, East Road	2006	Colin Rose	Sculpture	Stainless steel				
More images	Between the Lines	Fisher Square, Cambridge	2007	Peter Randall-Page	Sculpture	Granite glacial boulder	178 x 214 x 180cm			
More images	The Corpus Clock	Taylor Library, King's Parade	2008	John Taylor and Matthew Lane Sanderson	Clock with sculpture	Metal sculpture				
	Mother and Child	Exterior of John Lewis, Downing Street	2008	Sophie Dickens	Carved sculpture	Wood				
	Finback	Front Court, Robinson College, Grange Road	2008	Ben Barrell	Abstract sculpture	Bronze resin				
More images	Charles Darwin	Darwin Garden, Christ's College, Cambridge	2009	Anthony Smith	Statue	Bronze				
	Ex Libris	University Library, West Road	2009	Harry Gray	14 posts	Bronze				
	Reflective Editor	Station Road	2011	Douglas Allsop	Abstract sculpture	Black granite				
	Darwin	New Court, Christ's College	2011	Phillip King	Abstract structure	Steel				
	Snowy	Market Square	2012	Gary Webb	Sculpture	Metal				Inspired by Snowy Farr
	Southern Shade	Churchill College	2012	Nigel Hall	Abstract sculpture	Bronze				
	Wander	Station Place	2014	Dryden Goodwin	100 Engraved plates	Steel	Each 123mm diameter			
	Bird Stones	Mill Road Cemetery, Cambridge	2014	Gordon Young	Six monoliths and a bench	Stone and wood				
	The Barnwell Sentence	Kingsley Walk, off Newmarket Road	2014	Lucy Skaer	Mosaic	Lava, stone and glass				
	Infectious Agents	Cambridge Academy for Science and Technology	2014	Jo Chapman						
	Slate Work South	David Attenborough Building, Downing St.,	2016	Ackroyd & Harvey	Mosaic	Welsh slate				
	Flow	James Dyson Building, Fen Causeway	2018	Simon Tegala	Abstract sculpture	Steel with electronic screen				
More images	Cambridge Rules 1848	Parker's Piece	2018	Alan Ward and Neville Gabie	Monument	Stone				Marks the development of the Cambridge rules of football
	Hercules Meets Galatea	Cambridge North railway station 52.2239°N 0.1573°E	2021	Matthew Darbyshire	Sculpture					
	Dunamis	Academy House, 136 Hills Road 52.1907°N 0.1346°E	2021	Bushra Fakhoury	Sculpture					
	Danse Gwenedour	City House, 126–130 Hills Road 52.1915°N 0.1342°E	2021	Bushra Fakhoury	Sculpture					
	Ariadne Wrapped	Outside Cambridge railway station 52.1943°N 0.1371°E	2022	Gavin Turk	Sculpture					
	Timekeeper	Ironworks 52.2001°N 0.1414°E	2022	Jo Chapman	Sculpture	Bronze				
	True	King's College 52.2039°N 0.1159°E	2024	Antony Gormley	Sculpture	Corten steel	3.7 metres (12 ft) tall			Dedicated to Alan Turing

=== Clarkson Road ===
Image	Title / subject	Location and coordinates	Date	Artist / designer	Type	Material	Dimensions	Designation	Wikidata	Notes
	Mathematical Gates	Isaac Newton Institute, Clarkson Road	1970	John Robinson	Relief and gates	Cast iron				
	Creation	Isaac Newton Institute, Clarkson Road	1991	John Robinson	Abstract sculpture	Stainless steel				
	Intuition	Isaac Newton Institute, Clarkson Road	1993	John Robinson	Abstract sculpture	Stainless steel				
	Genesis	Isaac Newton Institute, Clarkson Road	1995	John Robinson	Abstract sculpture	Stainless steel				

=== Homerton Gardens ===
Image	Title / subject	Location and coordinates	Date	Artist / designer	Type	Material	Dimensions	Designation	Wikidata	Notes
	Setting Out	Homerton Gardens, Harrison Drive	2017	Harry Gray	Abstract sculpture	Bronze, stone and steel				
	Made to Measure	Homerton Gardens, Harrison Drive	2018	Harry Gray	Abstract sculpture	Bronze, Portland stone and limestone				

=== Lensfield Road ===
Image	Title / subject	Location and coordinates	Date	Artist / designer	Type	Material	Dimensions	Designation	Wikidata	Notes
More images	May Eternal Light Shine Upon Them	Scott Polar Institute, Lensfield Road	1922	Kathleen Scott	Statue on pedestal	Bronze and stone				Modelled by A.W. Lawrence
More images	Robert Falcon Scott	Scott Polar Institute	1934	Kathleen Scott	Bust in niche	Bronze				
More images	Alchemy symbols & University coat of arms	Exterior of Chemistry Building, Lensfield Road	1958	Mary Spencer Watson	Bas-relief	Stone				
	Inuksuk	Scott Polar Institute	1979	Axangayu Shaa	Sculpture	Stone				Sculpture from Baffin Island
	Husky Dog Memorial	Scott Polar Institute	2009	David Cemmick	Sculpture	Bronze				
	The Antarctic Monument	Scott Polar Institute	2011	Oliver Barratt	Abstract sculpture	Oak				

=== Madingley Road ===
Image	Title / subject	Location and coordinates	Date	Artist / designer	Type	Material	Dimensions	Designation	Wikidata	Notes
	Pulse	Institute of Astronomy, Madingley Road	1996	John Robinson	Abstract sculpture	Stainless steel				
	Promethus	Institute of Astronomy, Madingley Road	2004	James Atkinson	Abstract sculpture	Painted aluminium				
	Tree of Life: Encounter	The Woolf Institute, Madingley Road	2018	Helaine Blumenfeld	Abstract sculpture	Marble	3m tall			

=== Sidgwick Site ===
Image	Title / subject	Location and coordinates	Date	Artist / designer	Type	Material	Dimensions	Designation	Wikidata	Notes
	Span	Sidgwick Avenue	1967	Phillip King	Abstract sculpture	Steel				
	Bigger Bite	Alison Richard Building, Sidgwick Site	2010	Nigel Hall	Abstract sculpture	Bronze				
	A Local History	Pavement, Alison Richard Building, Sidgwick Site	2013	Edmund de Waal	3 vitrines filled with porcelain items	Various				
	Daze IV	Sidgwick Site	2014	Antony Gormley	Sculpture	Cast iron				

== Ely ==
Image	Title / subject	Location and coordinates	Date	Artist / designer	Type	Material	Dimensions	Designation	Wikidata	Notes
	Eel Trail	Outside Oliver Cromwell's House 52.3989°N 0.2591°E	2004	Elizabeth Jane Grosse	Bench			—N/a		Bench inscribed with a recipe for roast eel as used by Elizabeth Cromwell.
	Eel Trail	Babylon Gallery, Waterside 52.3959°N 0.2707°E	2004	Elizabeth Jane Grosse	Sculpture	Glass		—N/a		Glass pieces depicting phases of an eel's lifecycle
	Eel Trail	Outside the Maltings 52.3954°N 0.2694°E	2004	Elizabeth Jane Grosse	Sculpture	Stainless steel		—N/a		Eight glaives as used for hunting eels, arranged in an octagon mirroring the tower of Ely Cathedral
	Eel Trail	Jubilee Gardens 52.3951°N 0.2675°E	2004	Elizabeth Jane Grosse	Mosaic	Ceramic		—N/a		Eel mosaic, made from pieces of pottery found during a Time Team excavation
	Eel Trail	Cherry Hill Park	2004	Elizabeth Jane Grosse	Sculpture	Willow	9 metres (30 ft) long, 2 metres (6 ft 7 in) tall	—N/a		Hive woven from willow, as used to catch eels
	Eel sculpture	Jubilee Gardens 52.3948°N 0.2680°E	2006	Pete Baker	Sculpture	Steel	3 metres (9.8 ft) tall	—N/a		Gift of Ely Rotary Club marking centenary of Rotary International
	Sluice	Outside the Maltings 52.3951°N 0.2695°E	2007	Lulu Quinn	Light and video installation			—N/a		The video screens and lighting change based on live water level data from the Environment Agency.

== Fordham ==
Image	Title / subject	Location and coordinates	Date	Artist / designer	Type	Material	Dimensions	Designation	Wikidata	Notes
More images	Fordham War Memorial	Fordham, Cambridgeshire	1921	Edward Lutyens & George Frampton	Statue of Saint George on pillar	Stone		Grade II	Q26616619	

== Peterborough ==
Image	Title / subject	Location and coordinates	Date	Artist / designer	Type	Material	Dimensions	Designation	Wikidata	Notes
More images	Pearl Assurance War Memorial	Pearl Assurance offices, Peterborough	1919	George Frampton	Statue on pedestal	Bronze and stone		Grade II*	Q62132803	Erected in London in 1921, relocated to Peterborough in 1991
	Power Rhythm	Parnwell, Peterborough 52°35.8532′N 0°12.5177′W	2000	Robert Erskine	Sculpture	Stainless steel	16m high			Commissioned by Peterborough Environment City Trust to celebrate the millennium.

== Ramsey ==
Image	Title / subject	Location and coordinates	Date	Artist / designer	Type	Material	Dimensions	Designation	Wikidata	Notes
More images	War memorial	Ramsey	1921	F.W. Pomeroy	Statue on column	Stone		Grade II	Q26459919	

== St Ives ==
Image	Title / subject	Location and coordinates	Date	Artist / designer	Type	Material	Dimensions	Designation	Wikidata	Notes
More images	Statue of Oliver Cromwell	Market Hill, St Ives	1901	F.W. Pomeroy	Statue on pedestal and steps	Bronze and Portland stone		Grade II	Q22917664	
