= Bascom =

Bascom may refer to:

== Places and sites ==
=== United States ===
- Bascom, Florida
- Bascom, Montana
- Bascom, Ohio
- Bascom, Texas
- Bascom Auxiliary Field
- Bascom B. Clarke House
- Bascom Hill, University of Wisconsin–Madison
  - Bascom Hall, University of Wisconsin–Madison
- Bascom (VTA), transit station in San Jose, California
- Fort Bascom, New Mexico
- Bascomville, South Carolina

== Other uses ==
- Bascom (name), people named Bascom
- 6084 Bascom, discovered in 1985, a minor planet named after the American geologist Florence Bascom
- Bascom Affair, confrontation between army Captain Bascom and Chief Cochise triggered the beginning of the Apache Wars in 1861 at Apache Pass, Arizona
- BASCOM (Microsoft), a compiler for Microsoft MBASIC
- BASCOM-LT, a BASIC compiler by Mark Alberts for the AVR AT89Cx051
- BASCOM-AVR, a BASIC compiler by Mark Alberts for AVR microcontrollers
- BASCOM-8051, a BASIC compiler by Mark Alberts for Intel MCS-51 family of microcontrollers

== See also ==
- Bascom Maple Farms, Inc., Alstead, New Hampshire
- Bascom Palmer Eye Institute, Florida
- Bascomb
- Bascome
- Bascombe
- Baskcomb
- Boscombe (disambiguation)
