= Citizen Autistic =

- Film poster
- Directed by: William Davenport
- Release date: 2013
- Running time: 58 minutes

Citizen Autistic is a 2013 American documentary film directed by William Davenport exploring the advocacy work of autism rights activists. Citizen Autistic features interviews with autistic activists including Ari Ne'eman, co-founder and former president of the Autistic Self Advocacy Network, and Zoe Gross, creator of the Disability Day of Mourning annual vigils held in honor of filicide victims with disabilities. The documentary covers topics important to neurodiversity such as the debate over whether researchers should seek a cure for autism and controversies surrounding the nonprofit organization Autism Speaks and the Judge Rotenberg Center, a residential institution known for using electric skin shock aversive treatment as a form of behavioral modification.
