= Bascome =

Bascome is a surname. Notable people with the surname include:

- David Bascome (born 1970), Bermudian footballer
- Nelson Bascome (1955–2009), Bermudian politician
- Oronde Bascome, Bermuda cricketer
- Osagi Bascome (1998–2021), Bermudian footballer

== Commercial use ==
- FC Bascome Bermuda, a Bermuda football (soccer) club

== See also ==
- Bascom (disambiguation)
- Bascomb
- Bascombe
- Baskcomb
