= William Davenport (filmmaker) =

- Born: 1960 (age 65–66); Evansville, Indiana, United States
- Occupations: Musician, filmmaker, publisher, writer, teacher, autism activist
- Musical career
- Genres: Punk; noise; experimental
- Instruments: Synthesizer, guitar, bass vocals
- Years active: 1980s-present
- Labels: Another Room Public Hearings, Sordide Sentimental Records

William Davenport (born 1960, Evansville, Indiana) is a documentary filmmaker, musician, publisher, writer, teacher and autism activist. He is best known for his documentary films about autism, his work as the publisher of Unsound magazine, and as the founding member of the experimental/noise band Problemist.

== Film ==
In 2011 Davenport directed the feature documentary Too Sane for This World. This film, which features an introduction by Dr. Temple Grandin, explores the challenges, gifts and unique perspectives of 12 adults on the autism spectrum. The film features an array of autistic adults who share experiences such as autistic fatigue, social and academic challenges in school, and the relief of receiving a diagnosis.

In 2013, Davenport directed the feature documentary Citizen Autistic. The history of civil rights in America has been marked by the hard-won progress of one category after another of oppressed and marginalized citizens who stand up and demand recognition, respect, and equal access to the benefits of modern society. William Davenport's film Citizen Autistic brings us an inside look at the front lines of the autistic civil rights movement, showcasing autistic activists and self-advocates on the front lines of this struggle for inclusion, and freedom from persecution. Featuring notable figures such as Ari Ne'eman, co-founder and former president of the Autistic Self Advocacy Network (ASAN), and Landon Bryce, of thAutcast.com, this documentary details what the emerging neurodiversity movement is up against, from the torturous electroshock "treatment" that takes place at the Judge Rotenberg Center in Massachusetts, to the history of dehumanizing and alarmist marketing campaigns of the nonprofit Autism Speaks. Promoting a philosophy of neurological variation as simply another aspect of human diversity, these tireless activists embody the call of the disability rights movement: "Nothing About Us, Without Us."

In 2013, Davenport directed a music video for the band Array, which features Robyn Steward and Mark Tinley, who are both on the autism spectrum. The video, "Spacecadet," was released on World Autism Day 2013. In 2014, Davenport released the short documentary, Conquering Heights. In 2015, Davenport completed a series of documentary films that explore the world of experimental and noise music titled Unsound Redux. Continuing his interest in experimental music Davenport completed two documentaries in 2018: Media About Media about Media: The Negativland Story and Hunting Lodge: The Story of Two Nomad Souls.

== Activism ==
In addition to producing documentary films, Davenport is also active in the international autism community. Davenport was a member of the San Francisco Marin Autism Taskforce. From 2007 to 2011, Davenport was the executive director of the non-profit organization Autism Social Connection; it was there that he developed his practice of teaching filmmaking to adults, teens and children on the autism spectrum. He has worked extensively with the San Francisco Bay Area autism organization Autism, Asperger's Coalition for Education, Networking and Development, and the Washington, D.C.–based organization ASAN. In the United Kingdom, Davenport has collaborated with C.R.A.E. (Centre for Research in Autism and Education) and the charity – Ambitious about Autism – on free screenings of his films followed by panel discussions. Davenport presently is the executive director of Autism House, a Eugene, Oregon-based non-profit organization.

== Publishing ==
Unsound was a magazine published in San Francisco by William Davenport, Tamara L. and Chris Rankin. There were eight issues published between 1983 and 1986. Unsound was one of the earlier US-based publications that covered the industrial/noise/punk/experimental underground. The first issue of Unsound in September 1983 came about as a reaction against separatism, in which 'a select few become the only creative sources that are recognized.' Unsound focused on the harder edge of experimental art and music – the edge that most consider subversive. Artists/groups covered included Negativland, Glenn Branca, Ellen Zweig, Einsturzende Neubauten, Karen Finley, Boyd Rice (NON), Minimal Man, Sonic Youth, Whitehouse, Psychic TV, and Leslie Thornton.

Unsound also functioned as a networking tool where information was listed and exchanged on radio, publications, distribution, mail art, tape and record reviews, and more. The issues also included interviews with Blixa Bargeld of Einsturzende Neubauten, Remko Scha, Michael Gira/Swans, Genesis P-Orridge, John Balance & Peter Christopherson/Coil, and Kronos Quartet.

== Music ==
Davenport grew up in Southern California where he played in various punk bands in the mid-seventies and began experimenting with synthesizers and tape manipulation. Founded in 1980, Problemist was an assortment of musicians led by William Davenport. His first solo tape experiments were "Flat Child" and "Revolutionary Sex", both self-released. Davenport then began a three-year collaboration with Christopher Rankin of Sabot. In 1982, they released "Pop Religion is Love," and in 1983, "What is to be-Gun" on the Another Room Public Hearings label. The band then signed to Sordide Sentimental Records of France and released "Nine Times Sanity." Problemist continued to release recordings and appears on numerous compilations throughout the 80's. Known for their complex lyrics and wailing vocals, they continued live performances throughout the 1980s, some of which were chronicled in the audio release Problemist Live, 1981-1985. Davenport stopped performing and recording in 1990.

Davenport created soundtracks primarily for the video artist Steve Fagin ("Virtual Play: The Double Direct Monkey Wrench in Black's Machinery," 1984), "The Amazing Voyage of Gustave Flaubert and Raymond Roussel" (1986) and "The Machine that Killed Bad People" (1990).

== Discography ==
Problemist
Flat Child	Cassette	Self-Released	1980
Example	Cassette	Self-Released	1981
Pop Religion Is Love	Cassette	A.R.P.H. Tapes	1982
What Is To Be Gun	Cassette	A.R.P.H. Tapes	1983
9 Times Sanity	LP, Album, Ltd	Sordide Sentimental	1984
After Sanity	Cassette	Ladd/Frith	1985
N-e-e-d-y	Cassette	Die Ind	1986
Problemist Live,	Cassette	Cause & Effect	1987
Problemist also appeared on 17 compilations from 1983-1989

== Filmography ==
Too Sane for This World	63 minutes	2011
Citizen Autistic	68 minutes	2013
Conquering Heights	30 minutes	2014
Great American Cassette Masters	120 minutes	2015
The New Punks	96 minutes	2015
Ziners	56 minutes	2015
The People's Music	48 minutes	2015
Media About Media about Media: The Negativland Story	120 minutes	2018
Hunting Lodge: The Story of Two Nomad Souls	90 minutes	2018
