= Football in Bermuda =

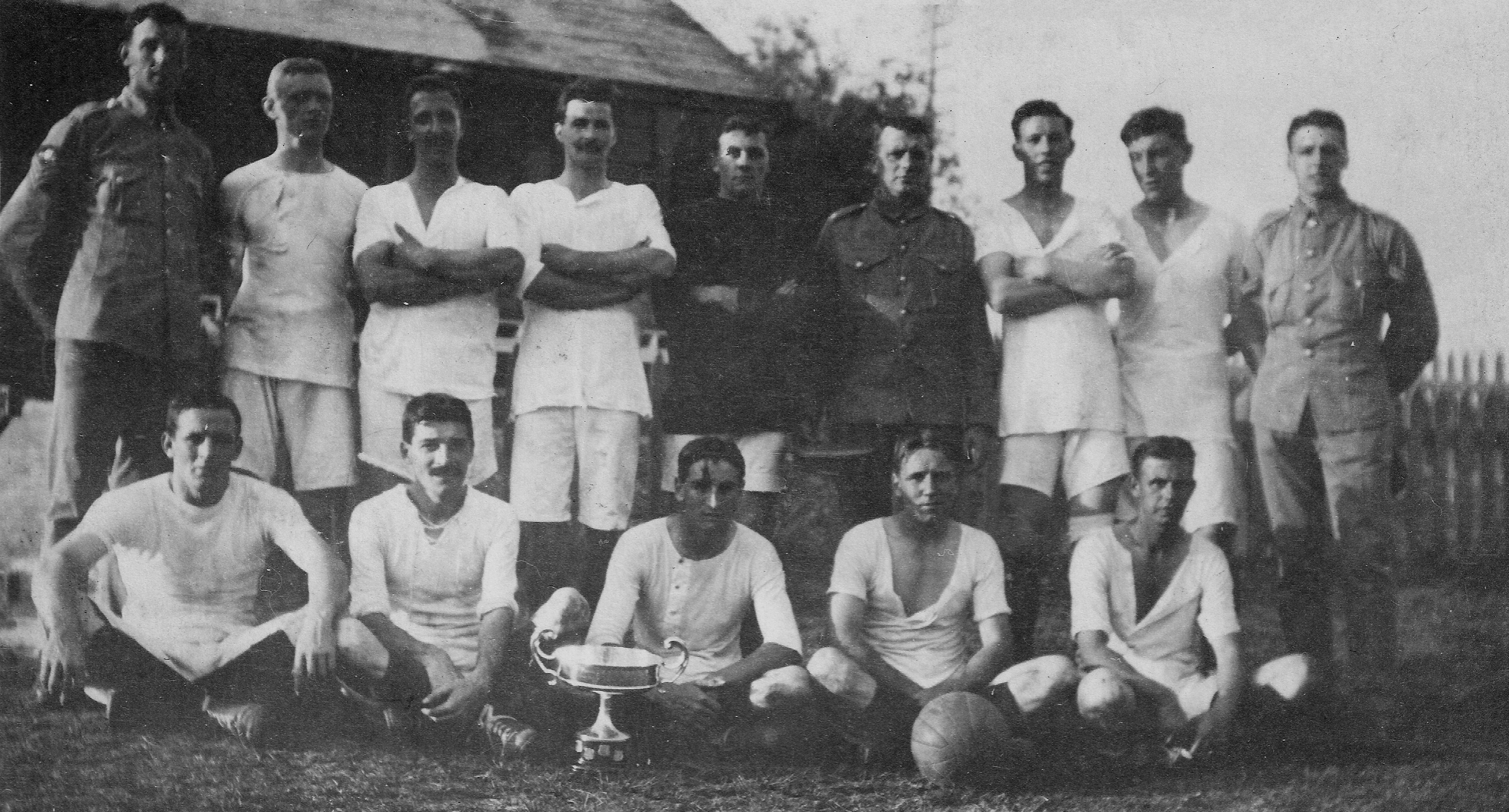
- The football team of 95 Company, Royal Garrison Artillery, victors in the 1917 Governor's Cup football match, pose with the cup
- Country: Bermuda
- Governing body: Bermuda Football Association
- National team: Men's national team
- First played: 1928; 98 years ago

National competitions
- Bermudian Premier Division

Club competitions
- Bermuda FA Cup

International competitions
- CONCACAF Champions League; CONCACAF League; Caribbean Club Shield; FIFA Club World Cup; CONCACAF Gold Cup (National Team); CONCACAF Nations League (National Team); FIFA World Cup (National Team); CONCACAF Women's Championship (National Team); FIFA Women's World Cup (National Team)

Association football is one of the biggest sports in Bermuda, along with the sport of cricket.

The sport was brought to Bermuda by the British. It is governed by the Bermuda Football Association (BFA) and is a full-member of FIFA, CONCACAF and the Caribbean Football Union. The BFA organizes the Bermuda national football team.

Today Bermuda's top domestic league is the Bermudian Premier Division.

== History of Bermudian football ==
The game of football was brought to the island by British in the early 1900s. In 1928 the national federation, the Bermuda Football Association, was founded, although it took the federation 34 years before getting affiliation with FIFA and CONCACAF.

In 1963 the federation started the Bermudian Premier Division which is to be the top division of Bermudan Football and still is today. In 2006 the BFA started a new professional club known as the Bermuda Hogges which started play in the USL Second Division, the 3rd tier of the United States in 2007. In 2009 the club moved down to the USL PDL, the 4th tier of the United States. After the 2011 season however the United Soccer Leagues announced the teams for the 2012 season with the Bermuda Hogges not being in the league alignment.

== League system ==
Level	League(s)/Division(s)
1	Premier League; 11 clubs (from 2020-2021 season)
	↓↑ 2 clubs
2	First Division; 9 clubs

== Qualification for CONCACAF competition ==
The club that wins the Bermuda Premier Division is eligible to enter the preliminary stage of the CONCACAF Caribbean Club Shield.

Competition	Who Qualifies	Notes
CONCACAF Caribbean Club Shield	Club finishing 1st in the Premier Division	No Bermudian club has entered since inception of competition

== National teams ==
The Bermuda national football team is the national team of Bermuda and is controlled by the Bermuda Football Association. A member of CONCACAF, it is not among its strongest teams.

They were runners up in the 1967 tournament of the Pan-American Games, losing to Mexico in the final.

However, the side has badly slipped down the FIFA rankings, losing to then non-UEFA members Gibraltar 2–0 in the 2007 Island Games in Rhodes.

== Notable Bermudan footballers ==
- Shaun Goater
- Clyde Best
- Nahki Wells
- David Bascome
- Reggie Lambe
- Kyle Lightbourne
- Andrew Bascome
- Osagi Bascome
- Dante Leverock

== National football stadium ==
Stadium	Capacity	City
Bermuda National Stadium	8,500	Devonshire
