= Jonathan Shestack =

American film producer

- Born: September 2, 1959 (age 66); Philadelphia, Pennsylvania, U.S.
- Occupations: Film producer, film director, activist
- Spouse: Portia Iversen
- Children: Dov Shestack
- Father: Jerome J. Shestack

Jonathan "Jon" Shestack is a film producer. He has produced well-known movies, such as Air Force One and Firewall. Additionally, he was one of the founders of Cure Autism Now (CAN), an autism-focused nonprofit organization that was formed on August 9, 1995 and merged with Autism Speaks on December 31, 2007. His father was Jerome J. Shestack, a well-known lawyer from Philadelphia, and his mother is Marciarose Shestack, a broadcast journalist.

Shestack has stated that his production style starts with a pitch for a script. He then refines the idea as needed until a studio decides that it will be made into a movie. He has also advocated giving credit to people that play an indirect role in moviemaking. He has been eager to use the films he produces to raise money for autism research.

Shestack started CAN after his son, Dov, was diagnosed with autism. The organization raised money for scientific research on autism, with a primary focus on cure- and treatment-related research. Shestack received many donations through his connections in Hollywood. He was known for being able to attract significant donors and awareness, to the extent that he played a major role in convincing the United States Congress to pass the Combating Autism Act of 2006. Initially, Shestack was against the merger of CAN with Autism Speaks, but decided to eventually accept it.

In 2010, Shestack criticized autistic activist and Autistic Self Advocacy Network founder Ari Ne'eman following Ne'eman's nomination by U.S. President Barack Obama to sit on the National Council on Disability. Shestack stated, "Why people have gotten upset is, he doesn’t seem to represent, understand or have great sympathy for all the people who are truly, deeply affected in a way that he isn’t."

In 2017 Shestack's production company was selected to produce the Netflix film adaption of the 2005 science-fiction book Old Man's War by John Scalzi. As of February 2026, Shestack's personal website lists the film as "in development."

In 2022 Shestack was selected to produce Only Apparently Real, a biopic based on Philip K Dick.

== Filmography ==
Year	Title	Role
1994	The Last Seduction	Producer
1997	Air Force One	Producer
1998	Disturbing Behavior	Producer
2001	Soul Survivors	Executive producer
2005	Waiting...	Executive producer
2006	Firewall	Producer
2006	Bickford Shmeckler's Cool Ideas	Executive producer
2007	Dan in Real Life	Producer
2009	Ghosts of Girlfriends Past	Producer
2013	Open Grave	Executive producer
2016	We Love You	Producer
2017	Before I Fall	Producer
