= Ann Didyk =

American printmaker

Ann Didyk (1916–1991) was an American printmaker who was active in the 1950s and was part of the Young American Printmakers show at the Museum of Modern Art, 1953–1954.

Her work is included in the collections of the Seattle Art Museum, the Arts Council Collection, London and the National Gallery of Art, Washington.
