= American INSIGHT =

Nonprofit educational organization

- Established: 1983
- Type: 501(c)(3) nonprofit organization
- Location: Philadelphia, Pennsylvania, U.S.
- Coordinates: 40.008446°N 75.26046°W
- Founder: Margaret Chew Barringer

American INSIGHT is a 501(c)(3) nonprofit educational organization registered based in Philadelphia, Pennsylvania.

== History ==
American INSIGHT was founded in 1983 under the original name of the American Poetry Center to promote free speech and the spoken word. Its success in Pennsylvania led to the creation of National Poetry Month. The organization legally changed its name to American INSIGHT in 2005. American INSIGHT’s mission is to promote the history and values of Free Speech, Human Rights, and the Rule of Law - and to empower students to use their voice to discuss how these values emerge in societies around the world through the lens of independent filmmakers.

== Free Speech Film Festival ==
American INSIGHT facilitates an annual Free Speech Film Festival that highlights prominent voices associated with global Human Rights. It welcomes submissions from independent filmmakers with films that present unique perspectives that highlight the fight against injustice, and are meant to engage the global community in deeper conversations about Free Speech, Human Rights, and the Rule of Law around the world.

- Philadelphia Citizen Review of 2022 Free Speech Film Festival

== Educational Outreach ==
American INSIGHT works with local universities to extend Free Speech awareness and skills. Additionally, it recently developed a Free Speech online course, Make History Every Day, to strengthen evidence and documentation based education and communication skills in the foundational areas of Free Speech, Human Rights, and the Rule of Law. The course exposes students to the techniques, issues, and the work of current global documentary filmmakers engaged in these areas.
