= Julia (Sesame Street) =

Character from the television series Sesame Street

- Sesame Street character
- First appearance: Sesame Street and Autism: See Amazing in All Children (2015)
- Created by: ASAN (major consultants)
- Portrayed by: Stacey Gordon

In-universe information
- Species: Human muppet
- Gender: Female
- Family: Elena (mother); Daniel (father); Samuel (older brother)

Julia is a fictional character on the PBS/HBO children's educational television series Sesame Street. She is known for being the first autistic Sesame Street character. Julia is a friendly four-year-old girl who enjoys bonding with her supportive family and her friends on Sesame Street. She first appeared in 2015 in an online autism awareness initiative from Sesame Workshop, entitled Sesame Street and Autism: See Amazing in All Children. Julia later made her first appearance on the television series on Episode 4715, which originally aired on April 2, 2017 (World Autism Awareness Day).

Julia is performed by puppeteer Stacey Gordon, whose son is on the autism spectrum. Julia's creation stemmed from Sesame Street staff members with autistic children wanting to add an autistic character to the program. She was initially developed with strong consultation from Autistic Self Advocacy Network (ASAN). Since her debut Julia has received favorable and positive reception in general. Controversy surrounding Julia emerged in 2019 when she was featured in a series of public service announcements (PSAs) for the organization Autism Speaks, prompting ASAN to part ways with Sesame Street.

== Role in Sesame Street ==
Julia is a four-year-old autistic girl, who enjoys various activities including drawing and playing with her stuffed toy rabbit, Fluffster. She is a friendly girl who enjoys bonding with her neurotypical friends on Sesame Street, who often grow in their understanding of autism in the process. She lives with her supportive, well-structured and happy family consisting of her father Daniel (an EMT), her mother Elena (an art teacher), her older brother Samuel and their pet companion dog Rose.

== Development ==
The idea to feature an autistic character came about when writers, with autistic children, were relaying how much their children related to and loved Sesame Street. The crew had debated on exactly what autistic traits Julia should embody, since behaviors of autistic people vary drastically from person to person.

Puppeteer Stacey Gordon assumed the role of Julia, in which she uses her experiences as a mother of a child with autism, as well as her prior work as a rehabilitation specialist, to portray Julia in an authentic way. Julia Bascom of ASAN was a major consultant when Julia was initially being developed. Christine Ferraro, a screenwriter for many Julia-based segments, also had an autistic older brother.

== Earlier appearances ==
Julia made her first appearance on October 21, 2015 in an awareness initiative entitled Sesame Street and Autism: See Amazing in All Children, which was made to provide resources “designed to serve autistic children and their families”. Julia made her first regular appearance on the main television series during episode 4715, which originally aired in the United States on April 2, 2017, a date strategically chosen to coincide with World Autism Awareness Day. Prior to her debut in the television series, a cartoon rendition of Julia appeared in a series of online autism awareness/information pieces from Sesame Workshop.

Julia later appeared in a 2016 Sesame Street digital storybook entitled We're Amazing, 1, 2, 3!, which was also released as part of the See Amazing in All Children initiative. We're Amazing, 1, 2, 3! was written by Leslie Kimmelman, who served as the senior editor of Sesame Street Magazine from 1998 to 2004, and is the parent of an autistic child. It also works to represent the DSM-5 criteria for autism ("persistent deficits in social communication and social interaction across multiple contexts; restricted, repetitive patterns of behavior, interests, or activities") in a format that children can easily understand.

In We're Amazing, 1, 2, 3!, Julia is depicted as having difficulty doing multiple things at once, such as talking while swinging on a swing. Julia is shown to communicate in a slightly different manner than other characters her age: requiring questions to be repeated or rephrased, using shortened phrases to express herself, and stimming as a response to heightened emotions. Julia is shown to be easily overwhelmed by outside stimulus, such as loud/excessive sounds, as well as hot liquids. Julia is also shown to have a strong memory, and is able to recall song lyrics more easily than her peers.

Subsequent online initiatives, featuring the cartoon rendition of Julia, have since been released after her introduction into the main television series.

== Reception ==
It has been argued that Julia's introduction to Sesame Street opened the doors for international television studios to produce shows with autistic characters, such as BBC's Pablo. Compared to other portrayals of autism in media, Julia's T-score—a rating of the severity of a child's autistic traits using the Childhood Autism Rating Scale—is much lower than the media average of 66. Her score of 45 is closer to the actual population average of 51. Julia's portrayal of autism goes against a history of media's gross exaggeration of autistic traits, instead showing children a much less stigmatized, more realistic, version of autism. Research has shown that Julia works as a learning tool for parents as well, leading to stronger understanding and greater acceptance of autistic children.

== ASAN's departure from Sesame Street ==
In the summer of 2019, Julia appeared in a series of PSAs from the organization Autism Speaks, encouraging parents to have their children screened early for autism. These ads were produced pro bono by the BBDO advertising agency, in partnership with the Ad Council and Sesame Workshop, alongside Autism Speaks.

ASAN condemned these PSAs and announced that they had cut all of their ties with Sesame Workshop and the series in a statement released on August 5, 2019. ASAN argued that partnering with Autism Speaks could result in further stigmatization of autistic people and further promote negative misunderstandings of autism in general. ASAN accused Autism Speaks of having a history of misrepresenting autism in an unduly negative manner, saying that Autism Speaks has even equated autism to a "terrible disease". These accusations and similar accusations have been prominently raised against Autism Speaks several times prior to this by various groups and individuals. Before deciding to cut ties, ASAN had tried discussing their opposition to Autism Speaks, repeatedly and in great depth with producers of Sesame Street, in an effort to convince them to reverse their decision. While some of their contacts agreed with some of their points, the decision to move forward with the PSAs was ultimately made.

Autism Speaks chief strategic initiatives and innovation officer, Lisa Goring, stated that the group's goal is "to empower families with the information they need so their child can be successful".

Following ASAN's separation from Sesame Street, Julia and her family continue to remain as regular characters on the show and in other media that is associated with the franchise.
