= Gary Webb (artist) =

British artist

Gary Webb (born 1973 in Bascombe, Dorset) is a British artist. He makes sculptures out of industrial materials, often achieving comic effects with the use of sound.

He studied at Goldsmiths College between 1994 and 1997.

== Exhibitions ==
Webb's solo debut was an exhibition entitled "Gary Webb plays Gary Webb" at The Approach in 1998. In 2000 he collaborated with Keith Farquhar on a sculptural installation at the Approach, and in 2001 he curated the group show "Brown," for the same gallery.

Webb participated in "Early One Morning", a group exhibition at the Whitechapel Gallery, in 2002. Reviewing the show, Richard Dorment described him as "the most original young artist I've come across in almost 15 years of writing art criticism." His first solo exhibition in a public gallery was at the Chisenhale Gallery in 2004.

Webb's work is in the collection of the Tate.

== Education ==
1997 BFA Goldsmiths College, London

== Solo exhibitions ==
2012

- Mr. Jeans. deCordova Sculpture Park and Museum, Lincoln, Massachusetts

2011

- Kukje Gallery, Seoul, Korea

2010

- Key Largo, The Approach, London

2009

- Other Criteria, London
- Diamond Standard, Bortolami Gallery, New York

2008

- Euro Bobber, Galeria Parra-Romero, Madrid
- Revolution Oil, The Approach W1, London
- Export, Atelier Hermes, Seoul, Korea

2007

- Gary Webb, Galerie Nikolaus Ruzicska, Salzburg

2006

- Gary Webb, Bortolami Dayan, New York

2005

- Mirage of Loose Change, Kunsthaus, Glarus; Le Consortium, Dijon; Centre d’Arte Contemporain, Geneva
- British Art Show 6, BALTIC The Centre for Contemporary Art, Gateshead, UK
- Still Life – Naturaleza muerta arte contemporaneo britanico y peruano, Museo de Arte de Lima, Lima, Peru

2004

- Deep Heat T Reg Laguna, The Chisenhale, London, touring to Mead Gallery, Warwick ‘05
- It’s All an Illusion. A Sculpture Project, Migros Museum fur Gegenwartskunst, Zurich, Switzerland

2003

- Evan Holloway and Gary Webb - Art Statements, Art Basel 34, The Approach London

2002

- Ringer, MW Projects, London

2000

- Nouveau Riche with Keith Farquhar, The Approach, London

1998

- Gary Webb plays Gary Webb, The Approach, London

== Commissions ==
2010

- Frieze Projects East, London 2012 Festival, London, UK

2009

- Snowy Farr memorial artwork public commission, City of Cambridge, UK
- British Arts Council, Regents Park, London (permanent installation)

2007

- Anyang Public Art Projecy, Anywang, South Korea

2006

- Swallow Street, Public sculpture (commissioned by Modus Operandi)

2005

- Musée des Beaux-Arts de Nancy
- Christian Dior, Dior Homme, Paris (25 Rue Royale)
- Home Office Building (Curated by Liam Gillick)

== Publications ==
2012 'Gary Webb Mr. Jeans' Exhibition catalogue from the 2012 show at deCordova. Paperback, January 1, 2012 ISBN 978-0945506683

2007 ‘Mirage of Loose Change’, Les Presses Du Réel, Dijon published in 2008 bilingual edition (English / French) 20,5 x 26,2 cm (hardcover) 176 pages (82 colour ill.) ISBN 978-2-84066-149-8

2005 ‘British Art Show 6’, Hayward Gallery Touring, London

2003 ‘The Moderns’, published by Castello di Rivoli Museo d’Arte Contemporanea, Rivoli-Torino

2002 ‘Early One Morning’ published by the Whitechapel Art Gallery

2001 ‘Tail Sliding’, The British Council ‘Casino 2001: 1st quadrennial of Contemporary Art’, S.M.A.K. Publications

2000 ‘The Saatchi Decade’, Booth Clibborn Publications

1999 ‘Die Young Stay Pretty’, Catalogue, ICA Publications

== Awards ==
2000 Two year ‘Delfina’ Award for studio space

== Public Collections ==
- TATE Gallery Collection, UK
- Arts Council Collection, UK
- British Council, UK
- Government Art Collection, UK
- S.M.A.K., Gent, Belgium
- Collection Musée départemental d'Art contemporain, Rochechouart, France
- Collection of Fonds regional d'Art contemporain des Pays de la Loire, Carquefou, France

== Gallery ==
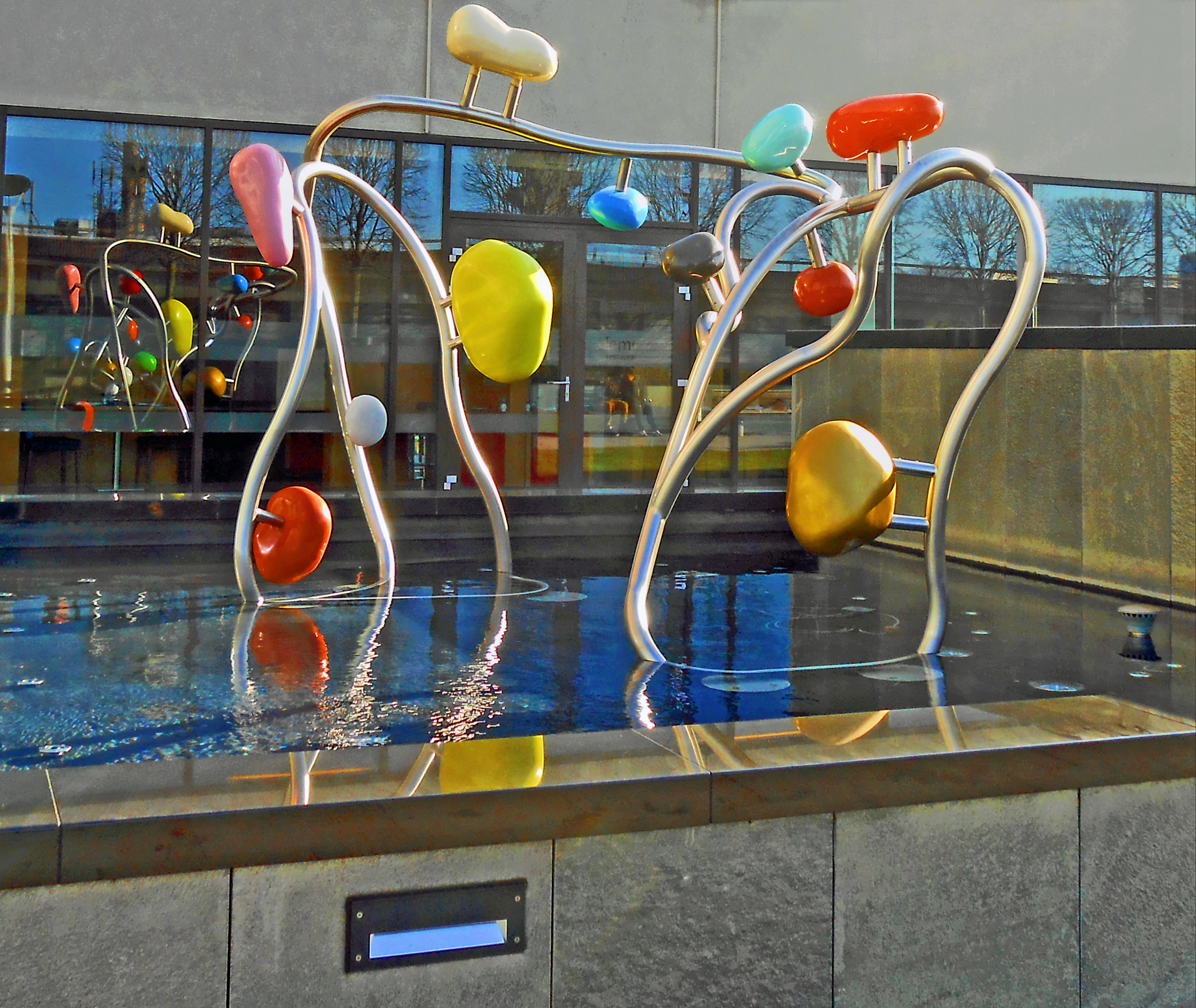
Billy Bob and Meshki in London

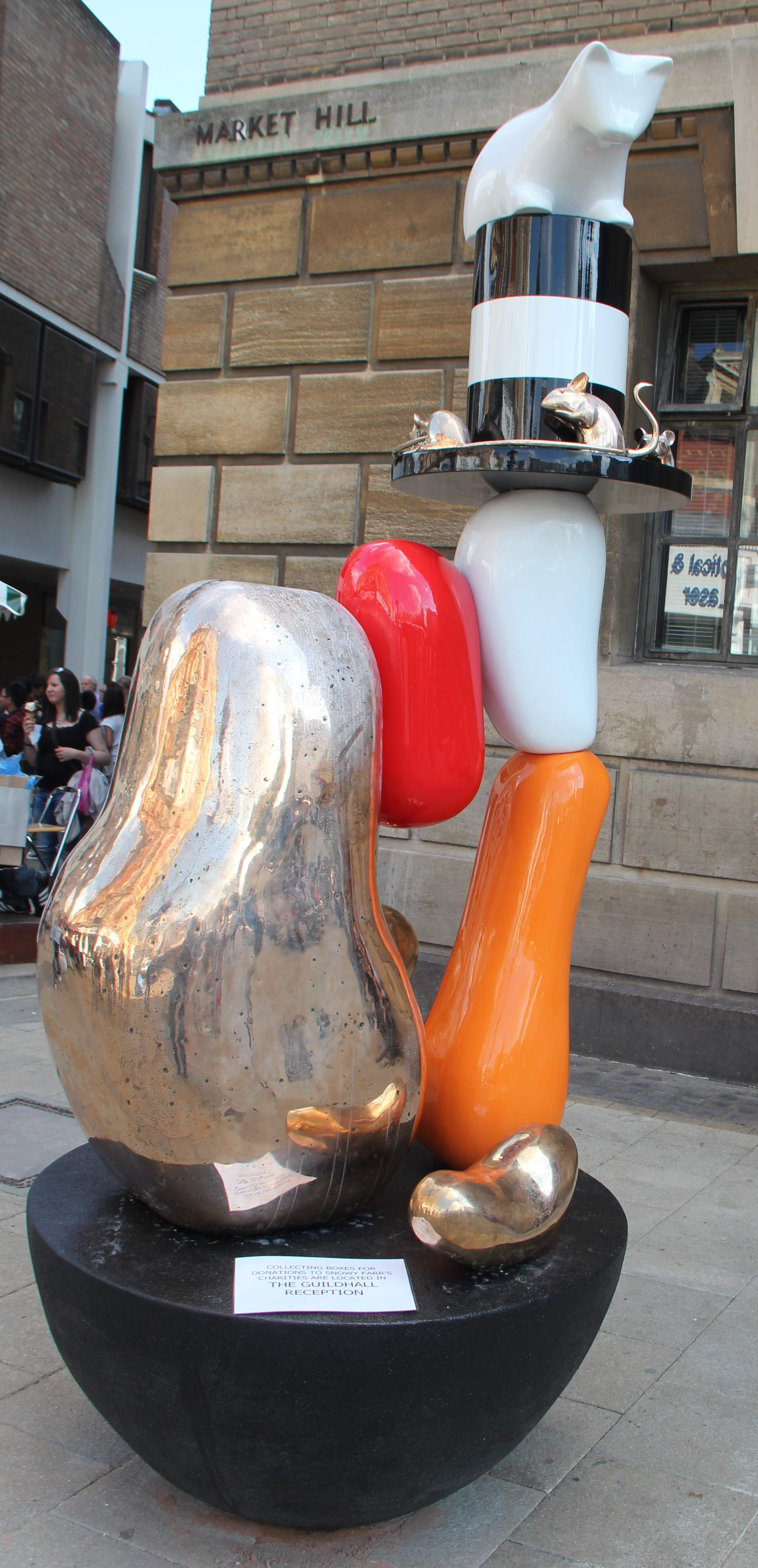
Memorial to Snowy Farr in Cambridge
