= American Poetry Center =

Coordinates: 40.008446°N 75.26046°W

- Established: 1983
- Location: Philadelphia, Pennsylvania
- Website: http://www.americanINSIGHT.org

American Poetry Center was founded in 1983 to bring the Spoken Word to a wide range of audiences. All programs were created, developed and implemented by Margaret Chew Barringer, under the auspices of the Pennsylvania Council on the Arts. For its first decade, Jerome J. Shestack, Esq. chaired the non-profit organization. In 2005, the organization legally changed its name to American INSIGHT as it prepared to reach new audiences through the latest advances in all-digital historic archival research, video production techniques, and Internet-based delivery systems.

== Poetry Month ==
American Poetry Center (APC) developed, coordinated and promoted a month-long statewide annual celebration of the Literary Arts across Pennsylvania for over a decade. The festival featured over 1,500 poets and writers at over 900 events in more than 100 cities across the state. Poetry Month has now become National Poetry Month coordinated by the Academy of American Poets in New York.

== Symposia ==
American Poetry Center produced annual symposia in Philadelphia that attracted national and international media attention, including substantial coverage in all regional newspapers, The New York Times and Radio Free Europe. Participating writers included E.L. Doctorow, Edward Albee, Joseph Brodsky, Susan Sontag, Galway Kinnell, Allen Ginsberg, Grace Paley, Etheridge Knight, Gerald Stern, Czeslaw Milosz, R.D. Laing, Amiri Baraka, Robert Bly, Dennis Brutus, John Ciardi, Marge Piercy, Amy Clampitt, Joyce Carol Oates, Robert Hass, Stanley Kunitz, Cynthia Ozick, Donald Hall and Yevgeny Yevtushenko.

== Soviet Writers Union Exchange ==
APC initiated a six-year cultural exchange program through a Reciprocal Exchange Agreement with the USSR Union of Writers. Over 100 poets, editors, scholars, and students from Russia and the United States participated in this first-ever exchange, including poets Richard Wilbur, John Ashbery, Yevgeny Yevtushenko and Andrei Voznesensky. Special receptions and readings were regularly held at the United States Embassies in Moscow and St. Petersburg, the Governor's Mansion in Harrisburg and the National Press Club in Washington, DC.

== The Spoken Word ==
APC sponsored dozens of poetry readings in Philadelphia featuring personal appearances by such notable figures as Russia's Andrei Voznesensky, Noble Laureates Czeslaw Milosz and Derek Walcott and Canada's Gaston Miron.

== Pennsylvania Writers Collection ==
Created in conjunction with the Pennsylvania Council on the Arts, the collection stocked over 300 titles by Pennsylvania poets and writers. American Poetry Center also distributed 25,000 free, bi-annual Literary Network Newsletters with book reviews, calendar of literary events and featured articles on publishing and fundraising for literary artists to universities, community centers and libraries across the state.

== Literary Arts Hotline ==
American Poetry Center coordinated this statewide, toll-free cultural resource (1-800-ALLMUSE) for the Pennsylvania Council on the Arts annually fielding thousands of calls from across the Commonwealth on literary events listings, book titles and resources available to poets and writers in the state of Pennsylvania

== Young Voices of Pennsylvania ==
A statewide poetry contest for schoolchildren, presented in collaboration with the Pennsylvania state library system and the Pennsylvania Department of Education. Judged annually by school teachers, librarians and nationally known poets, over 50,000 children participated in the Young Voices Poetry Contest, news of which reached millions of people per year through extensive media coverage.

== Great Voices of Poetry Extravaganza ==
An annual theatrical event featuring winners of the statewide Young Voices Poetry Contest and other award-winning Pennsylvania school students who shared the stage with Philadelphia corporate CEOs, government officials, artists, athletes, reporters and media moguls, all delivering their favorite poems.
