= FC Bascome Bermuda =

Association football club in Bermuda

Bascome Bermuda
- Full name: Football Club Bascome Bermuda
- Founded: 2005; 21 years ago
- Ground: National Sports Centre; Bermuda
- Owner: Andrew Bascome; Henrik Schroder
- General manager: Richard Calderon
- Head coach: Andrew Bascome
- League: USL League Two
- 2021: Did not play (COVID-19)
- Website: https://www.fcbascomebermuda.com/

Football Club Bascome Bermuda is a Bermudian football club based in Bermuda, that is set to play in the American USL League Two. The club was established 2005 and was scheduled to begin their first USL League Two season in 2020, before it was cancelled due to the COVID-19 pandemic. The club did not take part in the 2021 and 2022 seasons due to ongoing travel restrictions between Bermuda and the USA and has not taken part to the league yet.

== History ==
On 22 January 2020, it was announced by USL League Two, the American semi-professional soccer league, that Bascome Bermuda would be joining the competition for the 2020 season. The club was entered into USL League Two with the idea of providing a platform for young Bermudian footballers to eventually make it professionally. The club was entered into the league's Mid Atlantic Division for 2020. In joining the league, Bascome Bermuda became the first club to participate in the United Soccer League's from Bermuda since Bermuda Hogges played in the league in 2012. However, their debut has been delayed, as the 2020 season was cancelled due to the COVID-19 pandemic and then the club opted out of the 2021 season, due to continued travel restrictions from the pandemic. The club did not take part to the 2022, 2023, 2024 and 2025 seasons either.

== Ownership ==
The club is jointly owned by former Bermudian international Andrew Bascome and Henrick Schroder.

== Coaching staff ==
Position	Name
Head coach	(Bermuda) Andrew Bascome

== Statistics and records ==
=== Season-by-season ===
As of 22 July 2021

Season	USL League Two								Finals	Cup	CONCACAF	Top Scorer	
Season	P	W	D	L	GF	GA	Pts	Position	Finals	Cup	CONCACAF	Player	Goals
2020	Season cancelled due to COVID-19 pandemic												
2021	Did not play due to COVID-19 pandemic												
2022	Did not take part												
2023	Did not take part												
2024	Did not take part												
2025	Did not take part												

=== Head coaches record ===
As of 22 January 2020

Name	Nationality	From	To	P	W	D	L	GF	GA	Win%
Andrew Bascome	Bermuda	22 January 2020	Present	0	0	0	0	0	0	—

== See also ==
- Bermuda Hogges
- Football in Bermuda
- Bermuda national football team
- USL League Two
