= Stacey Gordon =

American puppeteer from Arizona

- Born: April 3, 1978 (age 48)
- Occupation: Puppeteer
- Years active: 2001–present

Stacey Gordon (born April 3, 1978) is an American puppeteer and voice actress from Arizona who is best known for portraying Julia, a four-year-old female autistic Muppet, on the children's television series Sesame Street. Gordon previously worked as a therapist for autistic children. Her son is autistic, and her experiences inform her portrayal of Julia. Gordon uses knowledge from her experiences with autistic children in portraying Julia. Gordon began puppeteering while in high school. She also performs with the Great Arizona Puppet Theater, and is part of an improv duo.
