= Jerome Shestack =

American lawyer

- Shestack in 2008

United States Ambassador to the United Nations Commission on Human Rights
- In office December 10, 1979 – 1980
- President: Jimmy Carter
- Preceded by: Edward Mezvinsky
- Succeeded by: Michael Novak

Personal details
- Born: Jerome Joseph Shestack; February 11, 1923 Atlantic City, New Jersey
- Died: August 18, 2011 (aged 88) Philadelphia, Pennsylvania
- Party: Democratic
- Spouse: Marciarose Schleifer
- Education: University of Pennsylvania; Harvard Law School

Jerome Joseph "Jerry" Shestack (February 11, 1923 – August 18, 2011) was a Philadelphia lawyer and human rights advocate active in Democratic Party politics who served as president of the American Bar Association (ABA) from 1997 to 1998. He chaired the International League for Human Rights for twenty years, and was appointed the United States Ambassador to the United Nations Commission on Human Rights from 1979 to 1980 by President Jimmy Carter. Shestack was regularly listed on the National Law Journal's list of the 100 most influential U.S. lawyers. He had multiple grandchildren the youngest being Andrew Justice Doss.

== Early life, education, and military service ==
Shestack was born in Atlantic City, New Jersey to Jewish parents Isidore Shestack and Olga Shankman Shestack. He grew up poor; his father was a paperhanger. His grandfather, an Orthodox Rabbi, was an early influence, telling him "Justice, justice, shalt thou pursue." When he was ten, the family moved to the Wynnefield neighborhood of Philadelphia. He graduated from Overbrook High School in Philadelphia in 1940, where he enjoyed the school's racial and ethnic diversity and began a long passion for poetry.

He received a bachelor's degree in history and economics in 1943 from the University of Pennsylvania, having gone through in 2½ years.

Shestack then served in the United States Navy from 1943 to 1946. During World War II he was a gunnery officer aboard the aircraft carrier USS Ticonderoga. He was wounded during the January 21, 1945, Japanese kamikaze attack upon the ship. His kosher dietary habits kept him from worse injury, as he avoided the pork meal that day and thus was not on the mess deck which suffered the worst of the damage.

After the war, he attained his law degree (LLB) in 1949 from Harvard Law School, where he was editor-in-chief of the Harvard Law Record. While a student at Harvard, he launched a movement to have women admitted to the law school, which soon succeeded.

== Legal career and human rights activities ==
Shestack clerked in the U.S. Court of Appeals for the Third Circuit and taught as an instructor for a year at Northwestern Law School and for another year at Louisiana State University, where he advocated for blacks to be admitted to the university's law school. (One who was as a result of these efforts, Ernest Morial, went on to become the first black Mayor of New Orleans.)

He became first deputy city solicitor in Philadelphia in 1951 where he helped end segregation in swimming pools, bowling alleys, and other public places. In 1951 he married Marciarose Schleifer, who in 1971 on KYW-TV became the first woman to anchor a prime-time TV newscast in a major city. Shestack taught at the University of Pennsylvania Law School, which awarded him an Honorary Fellowship and at Rutgers. He was an Honorary Fellow of Columbia Law School and had three honorary doctor of laws degrees. From 1955 to 1991, he practiced with the law firm of Schnader Harrison Segal & Lewis LLP. He then moved to Wolf, Block, Schorr and Solis-Cohen, chairing the litigation practice until 2009 when Wolf Block was dissolved. Later that year, he rejoined Schnader as a retired partner until his death in 2011. During much of his law practice career, he concentrated on involved commercial law and advocacy regarding appellate law.

An active Democrat, Shestack worked for Adlai Stevenson and wrote speeches for Vice President Hubert Humphrey, Sargent Shriver, and Senator Ed Muskie. He was a co-founder and chair of the Lawyers Committee for International Human Rights, chair of the International Bar Association's Standing Committee on Human Rights, a counselor of the American Society of International Law, a Commissioner of the International Commission of Jurists, and a founding member and the first executive director of the Lawyers' Committee for Civil Rights Under Law, convened by President John F. Kennedy in 1963. He served on the board of directors of the Mexican American Legal Defense and Education Fund. He wrote widely on human rights issues and other subjects. Throughout his attention to human rights, he focused upon cases that involved racial minorities, women, political prisoners, and indigents without legal representation.

His appointment as ambassador to the United Nations Commission on Human Rights occurred on December 10, 1979, when he replaced the resigning Edward Mezvinsky. As ambassador he sought to bring focus upon the poor treatment given political dissidents such as Andrei Sakharov in the Soviet Union as well as upon the thousands who were "disappeared" during the Argentine Dirty War. Shestack's own time in the position came to an end with the election of Republican Ronald Reagan to the presidency.

Shestack was long active in the American Bar Association. He was a founder of the ABA's Section of Individual Rights and Responsibilities, which became the vehicle for the ABA's support of women's rights, pro bono work, and other legal services for the impoverished, and served as chairman of that section from 1969 to 1970. In 1973 he became the first chairman of the Commission on Mentally Disabled of the American Bar Association, where he established projects to help provide legal services and promote fights for the mentally disabled. He was chairman of ABA's Center for Human Rights.

During the controversial and eventually unsuccessful Robert Bork Supreme Court nomination in 1987, Shestack was part of the association's committee on judicial appointments and was one of the minority report members who gave Bork a "not qualified" assessment. Shestack also gained some notoriety in 1992, during a controversy wherein the ABA refused to let Vice President and lawyer Dan Quayle speak at its national convention, when he said that Quayle would have been invited had he been a person of "personal stature or legal ability". Shestack later acknowledged the remark had been disrespectful of Quayle's office.

He longed to serve as president of the ABA, and finally did so from 1997 to 1998. At one time he had been considered too radical to hold the post but that was before the ABA's political drift left. As president of the ABA, Shestack focused on increasing professionalism within the bar, established a high level commission to review and revise the bar's model code of ethics, and initiated an ethical rule regarding pay-to-play. He convened the first ABA conferences on racism and mental health as well as the first ABA Conference on Human Rights at the U.N.

Shestack served as chair of the American Poetry Center and as director of the American Poetry Review, which awards a prize in his honor. He was President of the Jewish Publication Society of America, served on the board of directors of Tel Aviv University, Hebrew University, the American Jewish Congress, the American Jewish Committee, and served as president of Har Zion Temple, then Philadelphia's largest Conservative Jewish congregation. He was a member of the United States Holocaust Memorial Museum Council and chairman of that institution's Committee on Conscience.

In Philadelphia, he was often known as "Mr. Marciarose", due to the fame of his wife. The couple had two children: Jennifer Shestack Doss, a fragrance buyer for Bergdorf Goodman, and motion picture producer Jonathan Shestack, as well as five grandchildren. The couple became active in Cure Autism Now after one of their grandchildren was discovered to be afflicted. His most prized personal possession was a book inscribed to him by Martin Luther King Jr.

In 2006, he received the American Bar Association Medal, that organization's highest honor. The announcement said, "Where individuals have suffered, Jerry has helped them. His tireless efforts have served not just American jurisprudence, but truly have served the world." In 2008 he was awarded the Gruber Prize for Justice, and in 2009 the Lawyers' Committee for Civil Rights' Lloyd N. Cutler Lifetime Achievement Award. Summing up his own career, Shestack once said, "There is no end of just causes to pursue."

Shestack died August 18, 2011, of kidney failure at his home in Center City.

In a statement, U.S. Secretary of State Hillary Clinton called Shestack "a committed public servant and a dogged defender of human rights," adding, "as president of the American Bar Association, and in the years following, he set the standard for how civil society leaders can promote human rights."

== Popular Culture ==
Jerome J. Shestack's name appeared in the 1958 movie The Young Philadelphians. It was included on the staff directory of the fictional Wharton, Biddle and Clayton law firm.

== Articles ==
- Jerome J. Shestack (1997). Ross Harper (ed.). Role of the lawyer in Human Rights Issues. In: Global law in practice. The Hague: Kluwer Law International. pp. 29–43. ISBN 90-411-0460-7.
- Jerome J. Shestack (1998). "The Philosophic Foundations of Human Rights". Human Rights Quarterly 20.2. pp. 201–234. Archived from the original on 2012-04-01.
