= Bascombe =

Bascombe is an English (originally from Norman) surname meaning “valley of burrs and bristles”. Notable people with the surname include:

- Herbert Bascombe (born 1964), Bermudian cricketer
- Miles Bascombe (born 1986), Vincentian cricketer

== See also ==
- Bascom (disambiguation)
- Bascomb
- Bascome
- Baskcomb
- Boscombe
