= Bushra Fakhoury =

British sculptor

Bushra Fakhoury is a British sculptor working primarily in bronze.

== Biography ==
Fakhoury was born in Lebanon, the daughter of Bachir Fakhoury, a chemist. Fakhoury received her Bachelor of Art with a major in Fine Art from the Lebanese American University in 1969 and a teaching diploma from the American University of Beirut in 1973. Bushra took and passed a Diploma in Television Direction in Formal & Non-Formal Education conducted by the education and science division – British Council in 1981. In addition to her artistic studies, Fakhoury received a PhD from the Institute of Education of the University of London in 1983. Fakhoury is a member of the Royal Society of Sculptors, the Surrey Sculpture Society, the Chelsea Arts Club and the Chelsea Arts Society.

== Work ==
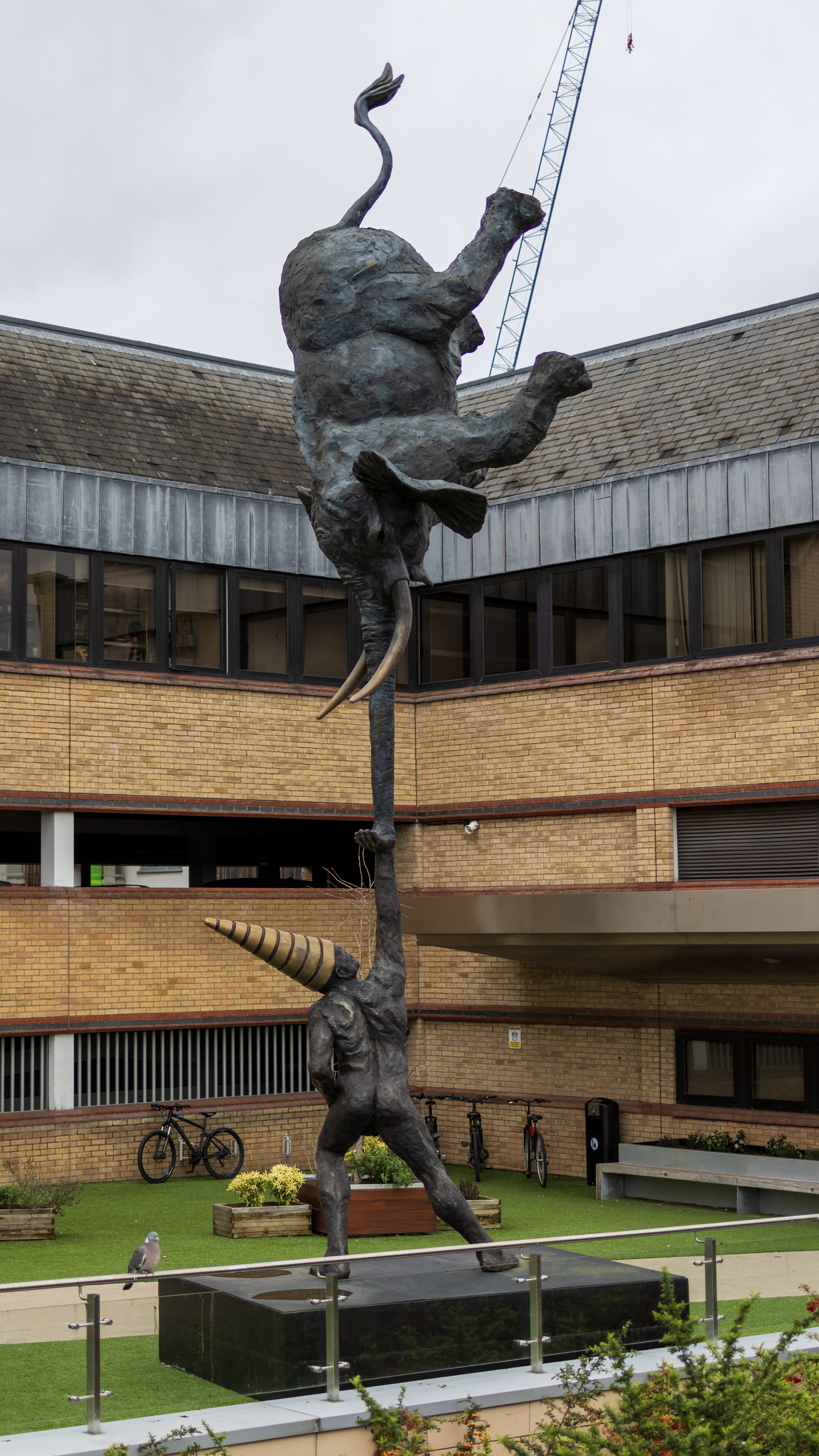
Dunamis in Cambridge

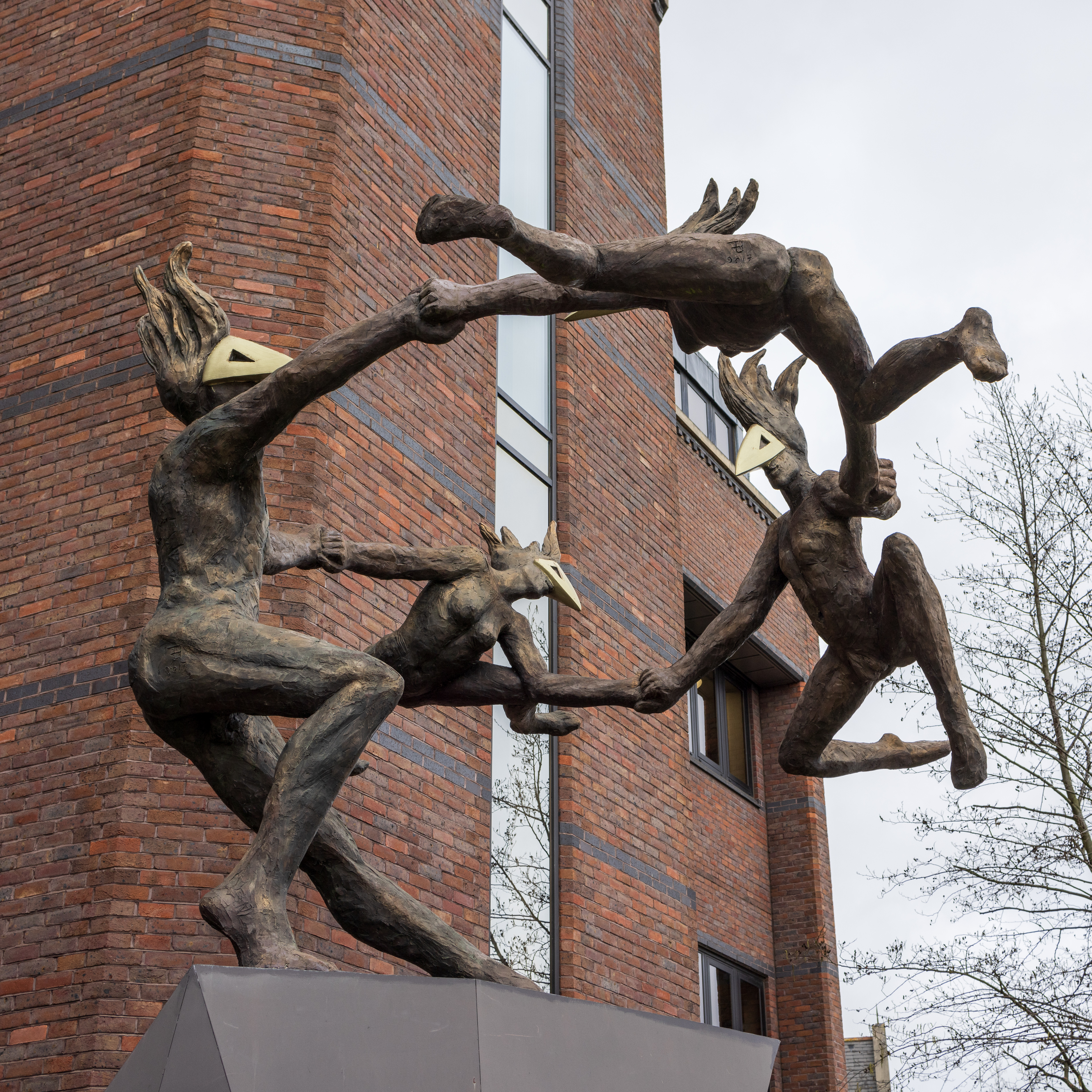
Danse Gwenedour in Cambridge

Fakhoury has described her aesthetic principles as "[showing] a steady search for dynamic animal and human form – grotesque, ironic, and a lot of humour, but invariably opulent and vehement. At the same time it is well-contained within the norms of stylistic discipline". Saatchi Art describes her 'thematic resources' as "vast and nourished by myths, fables and folklore. The dynamic conception of form implies space, defined not only by solids but also by the implicit orbit of movements in space". Her sculptures are initially modelled in plaster or clay before being cast in resin, cement, or bronze.

Fakhoury's collection of drawings of Beirut by the artist Stanisław Frenkiel were exhibited at the Bloomsbury Gallery in March 1987. An exhibition of Fakhoury's sculptures were shown at the Jablonski Gallery in April 1987.

Fakhoury's monumental bronze sculpture Dunamis was displayed south of Park Lane in 2013 and her sculpture Danse Gwenedour was displayed at Marble Arch 2017 respectively as part of Westminster City Council's City of Sculpture series. Dunamis depicts an elephant balancing on the hand of a circus performer and Danse Gwenedour depicts folk dancers as they defy gravity. The two sculptures were subsequently auctioned by auctioneers Farnon & Lake at Aynhoe Park in Northamptonshire in 2017, with Danse Gwenedour having a guide price of £360,000 and Dunamis with a guide price of £260,000. Both were installed on Hills Road, Cambridge in 2021.

Fakhoury's family invested £45 million to create The Mandrake, a boutique hotel in the Fitzrovia district of London. The hotel is owned by her son, Rami Fustok. Fakhoury's sculptures have been displayed at the hotel.
