= John Bascom Crenshaw =

American professor and coach

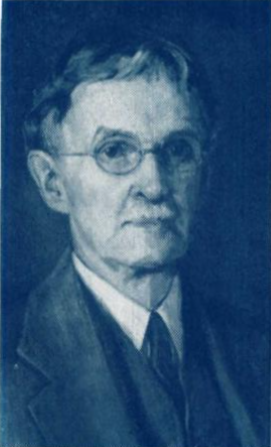
Crenshaw, c. 1942

John Bascom Crenshaw (1861–1942) was the head of the Department of Modern Languages at the Georgia Institute of Technology for 38 years, and also served as the school's first athletic director, in which capacity he started Georgia Tech's lacrosse team.
