= Julia Bascom =

American autism rights activist

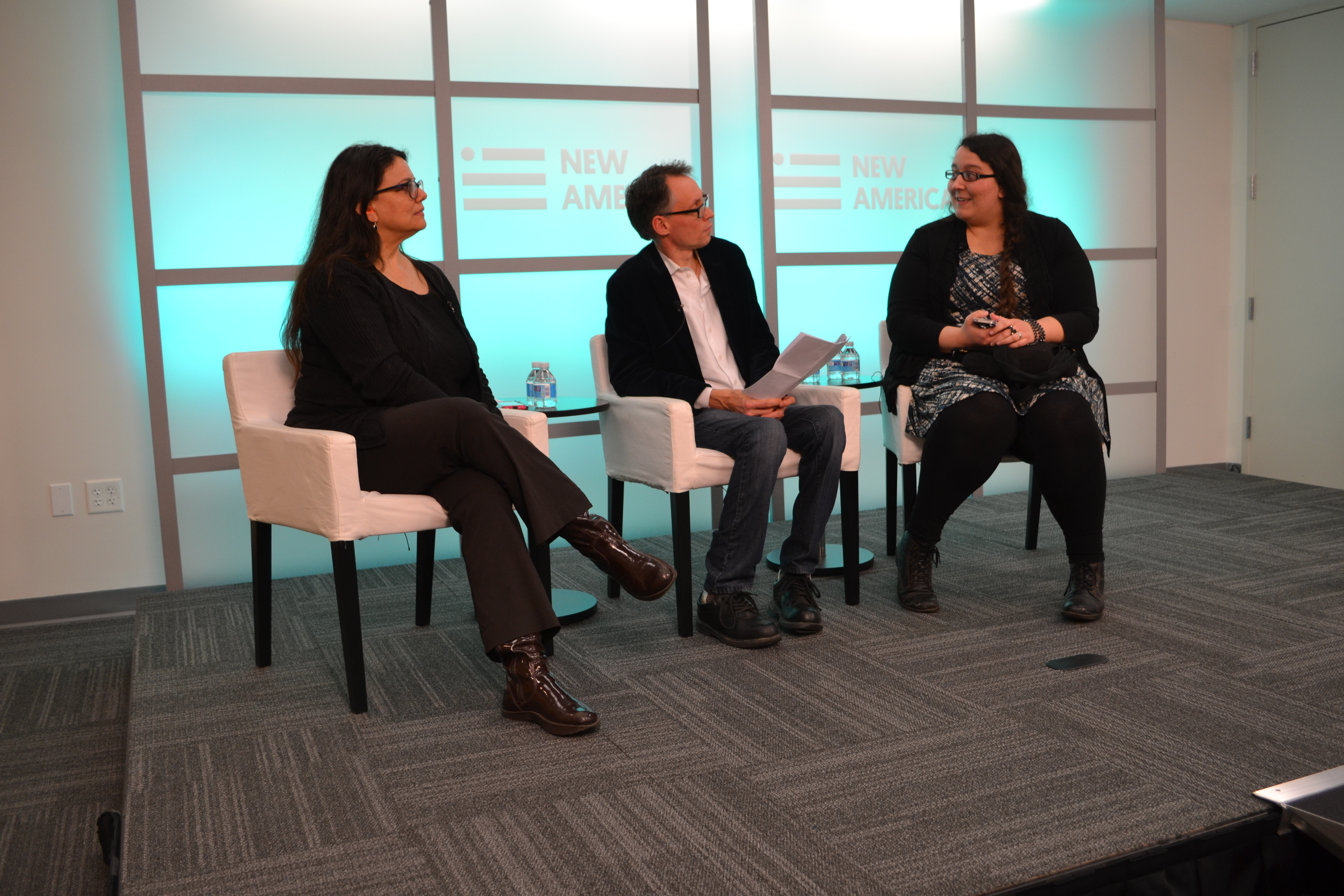
From left to right: Teresa Blankmeyer Burke, Lawrence Carter-Long, and Julia Bascom in 2015

Julia Bascom is an American autism rights activist. She is a former executive director of the Autistic Self Advocacy Network (ASAN) and replaced Ari Ne'eman as president of ASAN in early 2017 before stepping down at the end of 2023.

== Advocacy work ==
Bascom previously worked on the New Hampshire State Developmental Disabilities Council. She also serves on the boards of Advance CLASS, Inc. and the Centene National Advisory Council on Disability. She was the Deputy Executive Director of ASAN, and replaced Ari Ne'eman as president of ASAN in 2017. She left her position as president of ASAN at the end of 2023 due to complications from long COVID.

Bascom was one of the experts consulted to create an autistic character, Julia, for the children's show Sesame Street.

As an autistic person herself and an advocate, Bascom stresses the importance of letting autistic people speak for themselves on issues that relate to their health, rights and well-being. She states that it is important to recognize that autistic people are different and that there "is nothing wrong with us". On April 2, 2018, Bascom provided an overview of the state of autistic women and girls at the United Nations.

== Loud Hands Project ==
Bascom organized and founded the Loud Hands project. Loud Hands was designed to be a "transmedia project", that is, one that uses "multiple forms of content--written words, videos, visual art, the internet, and more". The project was launched in December 2011 as crowdfunding campaign to create an anthology of essays written by autistic people. The resulting anthology, Loud Hands: Autistic People, Speaking, was described as "groundbreaking" in Steve Silberman's NeuroTribes. The project has put together over 20 years of culture, history and writing by and about autistic people.

== Bibliography ==
- Loud Hands: Autistic People, Speaking (8 December 2012) (editor)
- And Straight on Till Morning: Essays on Autism Acceptance (28 March 2013) (editor)
- The Obsessive Joy of Autism (21 May 2015)
