= Nelson Bascome =

Nelson Blake Ainsworth Bascome Jr. (14 September 1955 – 14 July 2009) was a former Minister of Health in Bermuda,

== Biography ==
Bascome was first elected to the Bermuda House of Assembly in 1989 for the constituency of Pembroke East. He was re-elected in 1993, 1998, 2003 and 2007. Bascome was first sworn in as Minister on 10 November 1998.

Bascome's early education in Bermuda was at Prospect Primary School, Whitney Institute High School and the Bermuda College. In 1976 he achieved an associated Degree in Dental Technology from Kerpel School of Dental Technology in New York City, and a bachelor's degree from Morgan State University in Baltimore, Maryland in 1980. Bascome returned home to be employed and continued his studies, obtaining a master's degree from Webster and Indiana Universities in 1985. In 1993 he was the first Bermudian to become a Certified Employee Assistance Professional and established the first drug-free sports policy in Bermuda.
