= Elva Bascom =

American librarian

Elva Bascom

Elvira "Elva" Lucile Bascom (June 20, 1870 – November 5, 1944) was an American librarian, best known for her work editing Booklist from 1909 to 1913 and for her work on book selection.

== Early life and career ==
Elva Bascom was born in Greensburg, Ohio, Bascom was the daughter of that city's postmaster, Reynolds Bascom (1833-1901), and Lucy F. Andrews Bascom (1834-1920). She attended Lake Erie College from 1886 to 1889 and Alleghany College (where she was a member of Kappa Alpha Theta) from 1890 to 1894, graduating in 1895. Bascom graduated from the Library School of the New York State Library in 1901. She worked at the New York State Library from 1901 to 1908; in 1905 she assisted Martha Wheeler of the Library School in preparing a publication on "Indexing", with an introduction by library director Melvil Dewey.

Bascom took over as the editor of American Library Association publication Booklist in November 1909, moving to Madison, Wisconsin where the previous editor Katherine McDonald of the Wisconsin Free Library Commission resided (although the publication's business office was in Boston). It has been said that she "was the first Booklist editor to achieve national recognition". In 1912 Bascom published a new edition of the A. L. A. book catalog, a suggested holdings list for libraries. On leaving Booklist in 1913 she taught at the Wisconsin Library School. In 1918 she left a position as the head of the Book Selection and Study Club Department at the Wisconsin Free Library Commission and went to a temporary position as a library liaison at the United States Children's Bureau. In 1919 she moved to Austin, Texas to run the new library science school at the University of Texas at Austin. She served as president of the Texas Library Association 1922-1923. The program was closed down in 1925, and from 1926 into the 1930s Bascom was affiliated with the Carnegie Library School in Pittsburgh. In 1937 Bascom returned to Ohio to work as the Sunday school librarian at the Church of the Covenant in Cleveland.

Bascom is buried in the Pioneer (or Greene) Cemetery, Greene Township, Trumbull County, Ohio, with her parents and siblings. Of her siblings, several brothers died young and her sister Althea died shortly before her eighteenth birthday in 1885; only her older brother Harold Wales Bascom (1858-1939) lived into adulthood.

== Works ==
- "Indexing: Principles, Rules, and Examples" - pamphlet, 1905 (with Martha Wheeler)
- "Selected books on nature study for schools and libraries" - pamphlet, 1910
- A. L. A. Catalog, 1904-1911, Class List: 3,000 Titles for a Popular Library, With Notes and Indexes, 1912
- "Book Selection" - pamphlet, 1915
- "Child Welfare: Selected List of Books and Pamphlets" - pamphlet, 1918
- "Poems of Pennsylvania" - article, Pennsylvania Library Notes, July 1934
- "Kappa Alpha Theta Leisure Hour Library; five hundred books..." - 1938
