= Snowy Farr =

British philanthropist

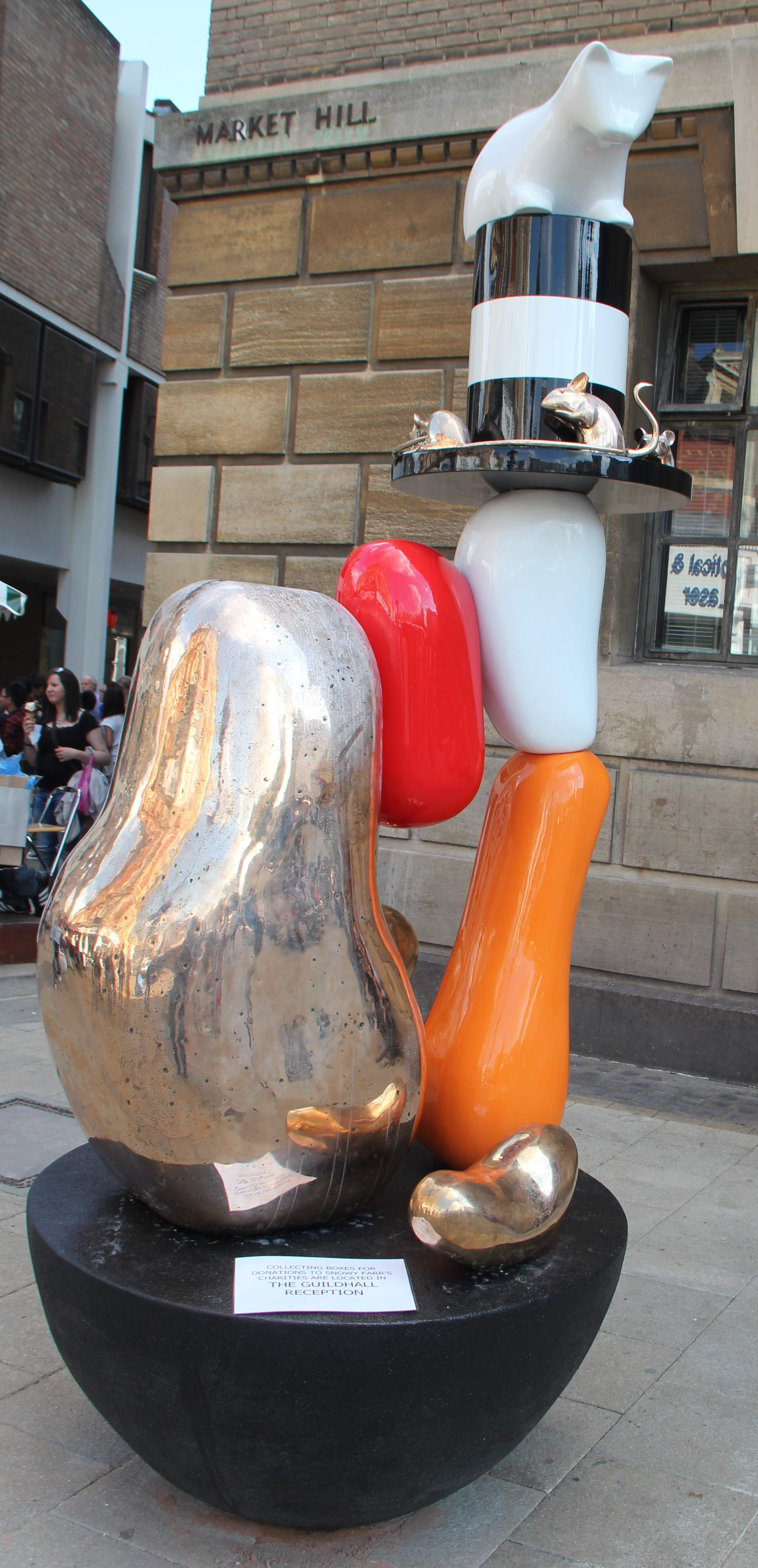
Snowy Farr Sculpture

Walter "Snowy" Farr MBE (b. 1919; d. Oakington, Cambridgeshire, 8 March 2007) was a British charity fundraiser who mostly operated in the streets of Cambridge, England. Over several decades Farr collected many thousands of pounds for The Guide Dogs for the Blind Association. In recognition of his efforts, he received an MBE in November 1995. Farr was usually seen in eccentric clothing, often incorporating antique military wear, and accompanied by tame animals, including mice, cats, dogs and even a goat.

A former local authority road sweeper, Farr lived in one of the terraced cottages on the main road through the village of Westwick, and later (after he had retired) moved to the adjacent village of Oakington and a bungalow whose garden contained a display of flags, dolls and teddy-bears. This collection was occasionally reduced in scale and exuberance in response to the demands of the local Council. A board outside the house recorded a 'running total' of the donations he had collected.

For many years, Farr also maintained the graveyard of St Andrews church in Oakington.

Farr was the subject of a famous photograph by Don McCullin, taken in the early 1970s.

In September 1977, Farr led a procession of 150 children around Cambridge city centre, filming for a TV show which never went ahead. Brief panic resulted when he became confused and took a wrong turn.

He later appeared in the ITV Yorkshire programme Snowy and the Buttercup Buskers, which aired in 1984.

A newspaper article from 2002 reported that Farr had been commended by the Cambridgeshire Society for the Blind and Partially Sighted after raising £62,005 for the charity; it also reported that he had raised £33,700 for Guide Dogs for the Blind and £28,305 for Cam Sight, which supports people with sight loss in and around Cambridge.

Farr died on 8 March 2007. Within a short time, suggestions were made on a local newsgroup that a statue to Farr ought to be erected near the site at the end of Petty Cury where he habitually collected. On 3 March 2009, Cambridge City Council announced the decision that a memorial of some kind would indeed be erected.

A Snowy Farr memorial artwork, designed by Gary Webb, was unveiled outside the Guildhall in Cambridge's Market Square in August 2012. The statue resembles a combination of Farr's cat and mice; his cat was trained to sit on his hat, and the mice trained to run circuits of the rim.
