= Herbert Bascome =

Bermudian cricketer

Herbie Bascome
Personal information
- Born: 14 July 1964 (age 62); Bermuda
- Relatives: Oronde Bascome (son); Onais Bascome (son); Okera Bascome (son); Osagi Bascome (son)

International information
- National side: Bermuda

Domestic team information
- Years: Team
- 1997/98–2000/01: Bermuda

Career statistics
Competition	List A
Matches	11
Runs scored	18
Batting average	3.00
100s/50s	0/0
Top score	17
Balls bowled	421
Wickets	7
Bowling average	37.28
5 wickets in innings	0
10 wickets in match	0
Best bowling	2/17
Catches/stumpings	2/–
- Source: Cricinfo, 31 March 2013

Herbert Bascome (born 14 July 1964) is a former Bermudian cricketer. He is the current head coach of the Bermuda national cricket team.

== Playing career ==
Bascome made his debut for Bermuda in a List A match against Trinidad and Tobago in the 1997/98 Red Stripe Bowl, followed by three further List A appearances in that season's competition. He next appeared for Bermuda on their tour to Canada in August 1999, where the team played a number of minor matches. Later in 1999, he made three List A appearances for Bermuda in the 1999/00 Red Stripe Bowl. He played for Bermuda in the 2000 Americas Cricket Cup, making four appearances against Argentina, the Cayman Islands, the United States and hosts Canada. In October 2000, Bascome made four further List A appearances in the 2000/01 Red Stripe Bowl, the last of which came against Guyana. These matches were his final appearances in List A cricket, with him having made a total of eleven appearances in that format, taking 7 wickets at an average of 37.28, with best figures of 2/17. With the bat he scored 18 runs with a high score of 17. In July 2001, Bascome played in the 2001 ICC Trophy in Canada, making two six appearances. He took ten wickets in the tournament, at an average of 16.70, with best figures of 4/23. He ended the tournament as Bermuda's joint leading wicket-taker alongside Dwayne Leverock. The following year he made four appearances in the 2002 ICC Americas Championship against the Cayman Islands, the Bahamas, Canada and the United States.

== Coaching career ==
In February 2019, Bascome was appointed head coach of Bermuda in place of Clay Smith. He had previously been an assistant coach to Gus Logie several years earlier. His contract was renewed in April 2021.

== Family ==
Three of Bascome's sons – Onias, Okera and Oronde Bascome – have also played cricket for Bermuda, sometimes in the same team. Another son, Osagi, played for the Bermuda national football team.
