= Arts Council Collection =

- Founded: 1946
- Key people: Jill Constantine FRSA (Director)
- Website: artscouncilcollection.org.uk

The Arts Council Collection is a national loan collection of modern and contemporary British art. It was founded in 1946. The collection continues to acquire works each year. The Arts Council Collection reaches its audience through loans to public institutions, touring exhibitions, digital and outreach projects. The collection supports artists based in the UK through the purchase and display of their work, safeguarding it.

The collection is managed by the Southbank Centre on behalf of Arts Council England, from which it is supported with public funds.

== Details ==
The Arts Council Collection has nearly 8,000 works by more than 2,000 artists and includes important examples by prominent British artists. Operating as a ‘museum without walls’, it is widely circulated and can be seen in museums and galleries across the UK and internationally. The Arts Council Collection also lends to public buildings, including universities, hospitals and charitable associations.

The collection includes works by Henry Moore, Barbara Hepworth, Ben Nicholson, Francis Bacon, Lucian Freud, Victor Pasmore, David Hockney, Bridget Riley, Gilbert & George, Richard Hamilton, Richard Deacon, Antony Gormley, Mark Wallinger, Peter Doig, Damien Hirst, Rachel Whiteread, Chris Ofili, Nour Jaouda, Steve McQueen, Mona Hatoum, Tracey Emin, Sarah Lucas, Grayson Perry, Glenn Brown, Jeremy Deller, Keith Coventry, Wolfgang Tillmans, Gary Webb, and Nnena Kalu.

As a collection ‘without walls’, it has no permanent gallery; however, changing displays of sculpture, video and installations from the Arts Council Collection are regularly on view at Longside Gallery at Yorkshire Sculpture Park. As well as lending extensively to museums and galleries across the UK and abroad, the collection can be seen in a regular programme of touring exhibitions – past exhibitions include Unpopular Culture: Grayson Perry curates the Arts Council Collection; No Such Thing as Society; Uncommon Ground: Land Art in Britain 1966 -1979 and Kaleidoscope: Colour and Sequence in 1960s British Art.

== History of the collection ==
Since 1986, the Arts Council Collection has been managed by the Hayward Gallery, South Bank Centre on behalf of Arts Council England and is based at the Hayward Gallery in London and at Longside Gallery at Yorkshire Sculpture Park.

== Acquisitions process ==
Every year the Arts Council Collection acquires work through an annual acquisitions process. Acquisitions are made through a committee of eight individuals: four internal and four external. The external advisers to the Acquisitions Committee usually include an artist, a writer and a curator, and are appointed for a fixed two-year tenure, alongside representatives from National Partners Programme venues who have a shorter, one-year tenure.

== Long loans ==
Current long-loan clients include: The Alnwick Garden, Northumberland; The Arts University, Bournemouth; Barbican Centre, London; Bath Spa University, Bath; the BBC Trust, London; Cambridge Institute for Medical Research; Cancer Epidemiology Unit, Oxford; Chatham House, Royal Institute for International Affairs, London; Ferens Art Gallery, Hull; King's College, London; National Institute for Medical Research, London; Norwich University of the Arts, Norwich; Oxford Combined Court Centre, Oxford; Paintings in Hospitals (Nationwide); River and Rowing Museum, Henley-on-Thames; Royal Society of Arts, London; Said Business School, Oxford; Southbank Centre, London; St. George's Hospital Trust, London; Trinity Laban Conservatoire of Music and Dance, London; University College, MRC Laboratory for Molecular Cell Biology, London; University of Greenwich, London; University of Hull, Hull; University of Leicester, Leicester; The Wohl Virion Centre, London; Arts Council England, London; Arts Council England, Brighton; and Arts Council England, Nottingham.
