= Bascomville, South Carolina =

Settlement in South Carolina, United States

Coordinates: 34°41′57″N 80°58′35″W

Bascomville is an unincorporated community in Chester County, in the U.S. state of South Carolina.

== History ==
According to tradition, the community was named after Bishop Bascom, a M. E. Church leader.

In 1925, Bascomville had 34 inhabitants.
