= Andrew Bascome =

Bermudian football manager (born 1963)

Personal information
- Date of birth: 13 May 1963 (age 63)
- Place of birth: Bermuda

Team information
- Current team: FC Bascome Bermuda (head coach)

Senior career*
Years	Team	Apps	(Gls)
- North Village

Managerial career
- 2012–2017: Bermuda
- 2020–: FC Bascome Bermuda
Medal record
Men's football
Representing Bermuda (as manager)
Island Games
Winner	2013 Bermudas
- * Club domestic league appearances and goals

Andrew Bascome (born 13 May 1963) is a Bermudian professional football coach who is currently the owner and head coach of USL League Two side FC Bascome Bermuda.

== Career ==
Since 15 August 2012 he coached the Bermuda national football team together with Dennis Brown. In 2017 Bascome resigned as coach of the senior national team.

== Personal life ==
His nephew was a player for the national team, Osagi Bascome. In December 2016 Andrew revealed that he and his brother David Bascome in their youth had been sexually abused by older players while the duo were at football academy.

== Honours ==
Bermuda

- Island Games: 2013
