= Dryden Goodwin =

British artist

Dryden Goodwin (born in 1971) based in London, is a British artist known for his intricate drawings, often in combination with photography and live action video; he creates films, gallery installations, projects in public space, etchings, works on-line and soundtracks.

== Biography and themes ==
Goodwin was born in Bournemouth. Central to Goodwin's practice is a fascination with drawing. He is engaged with time as well as line, and with the sculptural potential of two-dimensional images. Other concerns in his practice are the city, ideas of public and private, voyeurism, desire and emotional distance and proximity.

Goodwin's work has been shown nationally and internationally, including exhibitions at Tate Modern, Tate Britain, Tate Liverpool, The Photographers’ Gallery, London, The National Portrait Gallery, London, the Venice Biennale, OCAT Contemporary Art Museum Xi'an, China and the Hasselblad Foundation in Gothenburg, Sweden. His work is in collections including The Museum of Modern Art in New York, The Tate Collection and The National Portrait Gallery, London. His films have been shown in many international festivals since 1995.

“…Dryden Goodwin’s art has been defined by an increasingly rich dialogue between drawing, photography and film. In this work he has consistently focused on the human figure and the portrait form, the resulting work offering a speculative vision that considers the process of looking and representing, both in relation to what is experienced and what is seen.

That this speculation is always fluid, that no one act of representation, no one point of description, can ever be finally resolved in time, is also the idea which drives the shifting relationships between different media and the layered nature of Goodwin’s work. Often grounded in an experience of the city, Goodwin wrestles with the continually changing nature of our contact with the people around us, both the well known – family and friends – and the anonymous, the strangers we pass on the street.

His work marks an intense curiosity, a desire to know, and yet it is always alive with ambiguities about what the act of making work might reveal or obscure.” – David Chandler (from his introduction to Cast, a monograph published by Steidl and Photoworks)

== Solo exhibitions and projects ==
- SOLO X 9: Artists in Clerkenwell, Berry House, London 1998.
- Dryden Goodwin - Recent Video Work, Mid-Pennine Arts, Lancashire 1999.
- Dryden Goodwin - New Work, Galerie Frahm, Copenhagen, Denmark 1999.
- Dryden Goodwin - Wait, Drawn to Know, Stephen Friedman Gallery, London 2000.
- Closer, Art Now commission, Tate Britain, London 2002.
- Reveal, Lacock Abbey Wiltshire, commissioned by Picture This and South West Screen 2003.
- Dilate, Manchester Art Gallery, commissioned by Film and Video Umbrella 2003.
- Stay, Lighthouse, Poole, Dorset 2004.
- Draw in/Draw out, New Art Gallery, Walsall 2004.
- Dryden Goodwin, Stephen Friedman Gallery, London 2004.
- Repton A.B.C, collaborative book project and exhibition with Tony Grisoni, Woburn Square, Slade Research Centre, London 2005.
- Dryden Goodwin, Pro-Arte, St Petersburg, Russia 2005.
- Flight, Chisenhale Gallery, London 2006.
- Sustained Endeavour, exhibition of commissioned portrait of Sir Steve Redgrave, National Portrait Gallery 2006.
- Portrait Perspectives, Stephen Friedman Gallery, London 2006.
- Flight, Feldman Gallery, Portland, Oregon, USA 2007.
- The Calvert Centre Project - project in public space, Hull 2007.
- 12 Portraits (2008) - project in public space, Cabot Circus, Bristol 2008.
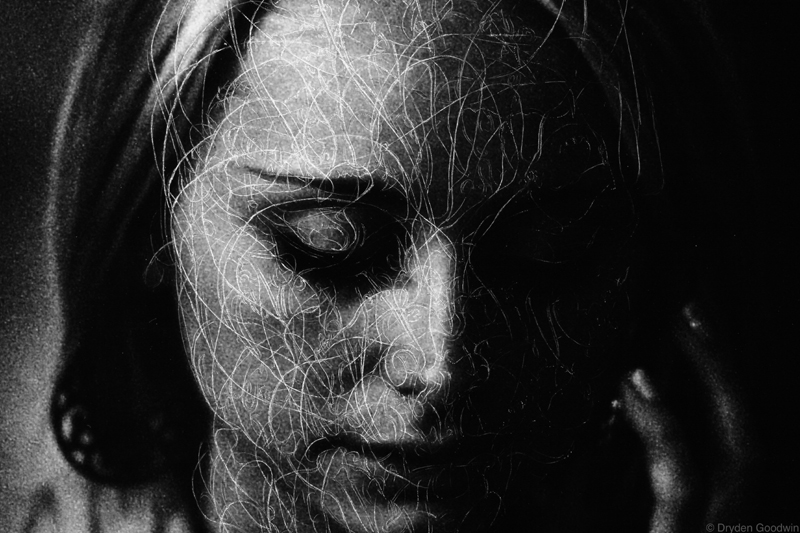
- Detail from Cradle 11 by Goodwin
  Cast, Photographers' Gallery, London 2008.
- Cast, Hasselblad Foundation, Gothenburg, Sweden 2009.
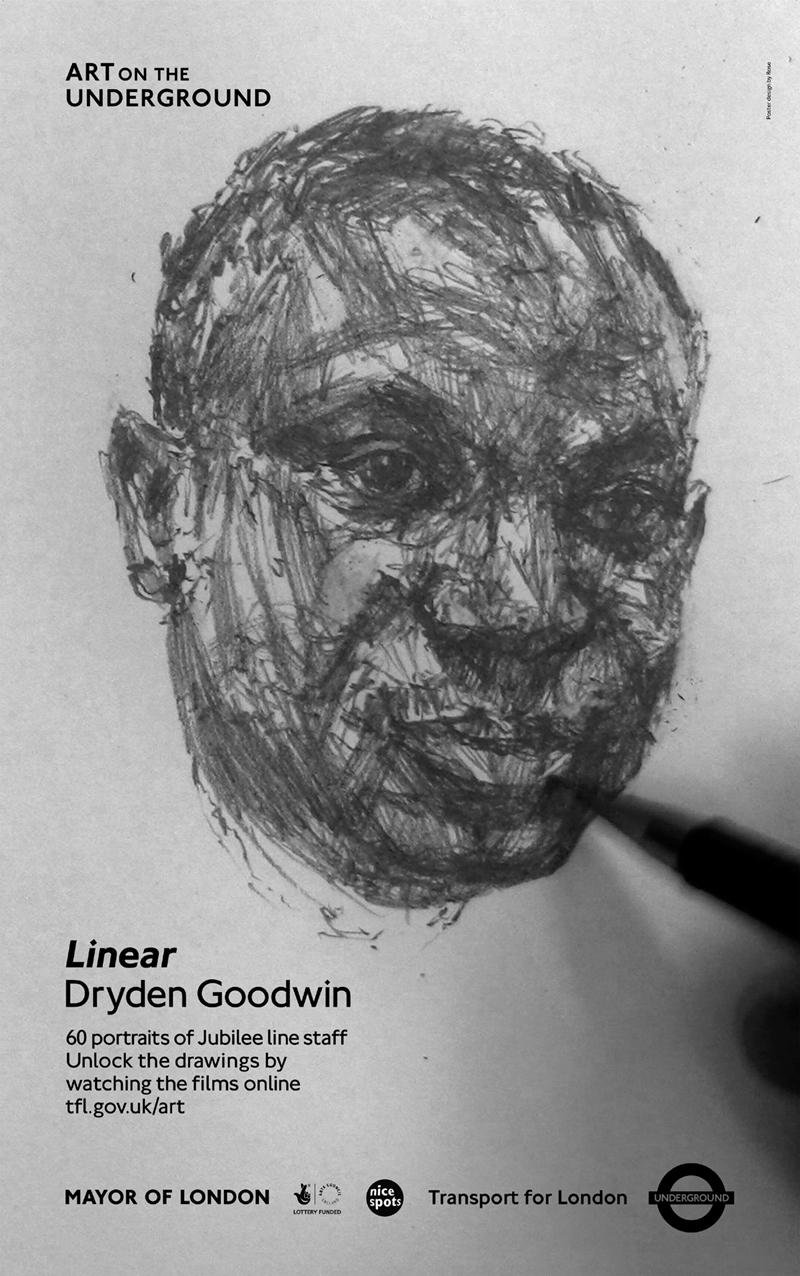
- Poster from Linear by Goodwin for Art and the Underground
  Linear, project in public space, commissioned by Art on the Underground 2010.
- Who am I? Gallery commission Science Museum, London 2010.
- Portrait of the Warden, Steve Nickell, commissioned by Nuffield College, Oxford 2011.
- Coax, Raum mit Licht, Vienna, Austria and Fotoforum West, Innbruck, Austria 2011.
- Breathe, project in public space, next to Westminster Bridge and opposite the Houses of Parliament, commissioned by 'Invisible Dust' 2012.
- Wander, project in public space, commissioned by Brookgate, part of the CB1 development, Cambridge 2014.
- Skill, project in public space, East Durham and on-line, produced by Forma Arts, 2014.
- Poised, Ferens Art Gallery, Hull 2014.
- Unseen: The Lives of Looking, Queen's House, Royal Museum's Greenwich, London, film and accompanying exhibition 2015.
- Skill - solo exhibition - MIMA, Middlesbrough Institute of Modern Art 2015.
- Un-Earth - solo exhibition, OCAT Contemporary Art Museum Xi'an, China 2018.
- Alongside - solo exhibition, QUAD, Derby 2020

== Group exhibitions ==
- New Contemporaries 1997 Corner House, Manchester, Camden Arts Centre, London and CCA, Glasgow 1997/1998
- Paved with Gold, Kettles Yard, Cambridge 1997.
- The Pandaemonium Festival, Lux Gallery London 1998.
- Traffic, Site Gallery, Sheffield 1999.
- Video Cult/ures, ZKM, Zentrum fur Kunst und Medientechnologie, Karlsruhe, Germany 1999.
- Video Positive - The Other Side of Zero, Tate Gallery Liverpool, commissioned by FACT: Foundation for Art and Creative Technology 2000.
- Drawing, Stephen Friedman Gallery, London 2000.
- Fantastic Recurrence Of Certain Situations, Canal de Isabel II, Madrid/Spain curated by the Photographer's Gallery London 2001.
- Reality Check, British Council and The Photographers' Gallery international touring exhibition 2002.
- Sanctuary, Gallery of Modern Art, Glasgow, Scotland 2003.
- Cathedral Camera, Baltic, Gateshead, England, commissioned by The Chaplaincy of the Arts and Recreation 2003.
- Century of Artists’ Film in Britain, Tate Britain, London, UK 2003.
- Clandestine, 50th Venice Biennale, Italy, curated by Francesco Bonami in the Arsenale 2003.
- Animators, Angel Row Gallery, Nottingham and Spacex Gallery Exeter 2005.
- Cross Town Traffic, Apeejay New Media Gallery, New Delhi, India 2005.
- Strangers with Angelic Faces, Space, London and Akbank, Istanbul, Turkey
- His Life is Full of Miracles...., Site Gallery, Sheffield 2006
- Frank Cohen Collection - New Art Gallery, Walsall 2006
- Sporting Lives: Contemporary Portraits of Athletes and Olympians, National Portrait Gallery, London 2007.
- Global Cities, Tate Modern, London 2007.
- With the Hand in Mind, Princeton University Art Museum 2007.
- London Calling - Who Gets to Run the World, Hanjiyun Contemporary Space, Beijing, China and Total Museum, Seoul, South Korea 2007.
- Pattern Recognition, The City Gallery, Leicester 2009.
- Grand National - Art from Britain, Vestfossen Kunstlaboratorium, Vestfossen, Norway 2010.
- The Half Shut Door: Artists' Soundtracks, SE8 Gallery, London 2011.
- Images of the Mind, Moravian Gallery in Brno, Czech Republic 2011.
- Flight and the Artistic Imagination, The Art Galleries, Compton Verney, Warwickshire 2012.
- Canary Wharf Screen, Closer part of Film and Video Umbrella's programme The City in the City 2012.
- Canary Wharf Screen, Fight part of Animate Project's programme Moving Up 2012.
- Born in 1987: The Animated GIF, exhibited on The Wall at The Photographers’ Gallery, London 2012.
- Courtship of the Peoples - Simon Oldfield Gallery, London 2012.
- Poetry of Motion, National Portrait Gallery, London 2012.
- Exquisite Forest, Tate Modern, featured artist, contributing a 'seed' animation. Part of a collaborative drawing project conceived by Chris Milk and Aaron Koblin, and produced by Google and Tate 2012.
- The World in London, Photographers’ Gallery, offsite exhibition, Victoria Park, coinciding with London Olympics and Paralympic Games 2012.
- Everything Flows: The Art of Being in the Zone, De La Warr Pavilion, Bexhill-on-Sea, commissioned by Film and Video Umbrella 2012.
- Canary Wharf Screen, Canary Wharf Underground Station, selected films from Linear 2013
- Poster Art 150: London Underground's Greatest Designs, London Transport Museum, animated poster from Linear one of 150 selected from the 3300 Underground-specific posters from the London Underground's 150-year history 2013.
- Work, Rest and Play: British Photography from the 1960s until Today, curated by The Photographers’ Gallery, London - touring China 2015–2016.
- Up/Down, Holden Gallery, Manchester 2016.
- Stories in the Dark, curated by Ben Judd for the Whitstable Biennale, exhibited at the Beaney House of Art and Knowledge, Canterbury 2016.

== Filmography ==
- Heathrow (1994) 13 minutes
- Hold (1996) 5 minutes
- Ospedale (1997) 17 minutes
- Reveal (2003) 15 minutes
- Flight (2006) 7 minutes 43 seconds
- On Reflection (2007) 7 minutes 30 seconds
- Poised (2012) 28 minutes
- Skill (2014) 72 minutes
- Unseen: The Lives of Looking (2015) 90 minutes
- Alongside (2019) 24 minutes
