= Boscombe (disambiguation) =

Boscombe may refer to:

- Boscombe, Dorset, a suburb of Bournemouth, England

- Boscombe railway station, its former railway station
- Boscombe Football Club, a former name for A.F.C. Bournemouth

- Boscombe, Wiltshire, England
- Boscombe, Alberta, Canada

== See also ==
- Boscombe Down
