= Baskcomb =

Baskcomb is a surname. Notable people with the surname include:

- Betty Baskcomb (1914–2003), British film and television actor
- John Baskcomb (1916–2000), British film and television character actor

== See also ==
- Bascom (disambiguation)
- Bascomb
- Bascome
- Bascombe
