= Bascomb =

Bascomb is a surname. Notable people with the surname include:

- Dud Bascomb (1916–1972), American jazz trumpeter
- Neal Bascomb (born 1971), American journalist and author
- Paul Bascomb (1912–1986), American jazz saxophonist
- Wilbur "Bad" Bascomb, American jazz musician

== See also ==
- Bad Bascomb (film), 1946 Hollywood western movie starring Wallace Beery as Zed Bascomb
- Bascom (disambiguation)
- Bascome
- Bascombe
- Baskcomb
