= Osagi Bascome =

Bermudian footballer (1998–2021)

Personal information
- Date of birth: 17 April 1998
- Place of birth: Hamilton, Bermuda
- Date of death: 18 December 2021 (aged 23)
- Place of death: St. David's Island, Bermuda
- Position: Forward

Youth career
- Aston Villa
- Stoke City
- Valencia
- Levante
- Bristol City
- UD Alginet

Senior career*
Years	Team	Apps	(Gls)
2019	Massanassa C.F.		
2019–2020	Darlington	11	(0)
2020–2021	St. George's Colts		

International career
- Bermuda U15
- Bermuda U17
2017	Bermuda U20	3	(0)
2016–2020	Bermuda	19	(1)
- * Club domestic league appearances and goals

Osagi Bascome (17 April 1998 – 18 December 2021) was a Bermudian footballer who played as a forward.

Bascome spent his youth with several English and Spanish clubs, while as a senior he represented Massanassa in Spain, Darlington in England's National League North and St. George's Colts in the Bermudian Premier Division. He played 19 games for Bermuda between 2016 and 2020, scoring once, and assisted two goals at the 2019 CONCACAF Gold Cup. He died after being stabbed, in December 2021, at the age of 23.

== Career ==
Bascome spent time in the academies of Aston Villa and Stoke City in England and of Valencia and Levante in Spain.

After an extended trial period, Bristol City signed Bascome in February 2017 for the remainder of the season.

On 26 March 2019, after a spell at Spanish club Massanassa, Bascome joined National League North side Darlington on a deal until the end of the season. He made his debut the next day in a 2–0 loss at Stockport County, coming on as a substitute before himself being replaced. His deal was extended into the following season, and he started six league matches at the start of that following season, but he gradually dropped out of first-team contention and left the club by mutual consent on 10 February 2020. On 9 November 2019, in the first round of the FA Cup away to EFL League Two club Walsall, he took a free kick from which Joe Wheatley scored the 2–2 equaliser in the seventh minute of added time.

After his release from Darlington, Bascome returned to Bermuda and played for St. George's Colts in the Bermudian Premier Division. His final game was a 1–0 victory over Somserset Eagles on 5 December 2021.

== International career ==
At the youth level Bascome was capped at the under-15, under-17 and under-20 levels. He made his full international debut on 4 June 2016, in a 1–0 home loss to the Dominican Republic. On 12 October 2018, he scored his only international goal in a 12–0 win over visitors Sint Maarten, in CONCACAF Nations League qualification.

Bascome was called up for the 2019 CONCACAF Gold Cup in the United States, Bermuda's first major tournament. He started all three games – losses to Haiti and Costa Rica and a win over Nicaragua – as his team were eliminated in third place. He assisted the opening goal by Dante Leverock to give Bermuda a shock half-time lead in the second game, and also set up Lejuan Simmons's opening goal in the last match.

== Personal life and death ==
Bascome was the son of Herbert Bascome and brother of Oronde, Onias and Okera Bascome, all of whom played for the Bermuda national cricket team.

His cousin Drewonde Bascome is a professional footballer who also plays for Bermuda. The brothers are nephews of Bermudan coach Andrew Bascome, and great-nephews of government minister Lovitta Foggo.

On 18 December 2021, Bascome was stabbed outside a restaurant on St. David's Island, Bermuda, and later died. He was 23.

== International statistics ==
Bermuda
Year	Apps	Goals
2016	1	0
2017	4	0
2018	3	1
2019	10	0
2020	1	0
Total	19	1

=== International goal ===
Scores and results list Bermuda's goal tally first, score column indicates score after each Bascome goal.

List of international goals scored by Osagi Bascome
No.	Date	Venue	Opponent	Score	Result	Competition
1	12 October 2018	Bermuda National Stadium, Hamilton, Bermuda	Sint Maarten	7–0	12–0	2019–20 CONCACAF Nations League qualification
