= Ari Ne'eman =

American autistic rights activist

- Born: Ari Daniel Ne'eman; December 10, 1987 (age 38); East Brunswick, New Jersey, U.S.

Ari Daniel Ne'eman (/neɪəˈmɑːn/; born December 10, 1987) is an American autistic disability rights activist and researcher who co-founded the Autistic Self Advocacy Network (ASAN) in 2006. On December 16, 2009, President Barack Obama announced that Ne'eman would be appointed to the National Council on Disability (NCD). After an anonymous hold was lifted, Ne'eman was unanimously confirmed by the United States Senate to serve on the Council on June 22, 2010. He chaired the council's Policy & Program Evaluation Committee and was the first autistic person to serve on the council. In 2015, Ne'eman left the National Council on Disability at the end of his second term. He currently serves as a consultant to the American Civil Liberties Union. He is currently an assistant professor at the Department of Health Policy and Management of Harvard University.

== Early life ==
Ne'eman was born to American-Israeli and Israeli parents and raised in Conservative Judaism. Ne'eman grew up in East Brunswick, New Jersey, where he attended East Brunswick High School. He displayed autistic traits at an early age, and eventually developed an interest in public policy. He engages in stimming, such as pacing and hand-flapping. He also has sensory processing issues that affect his reactions to certain sounds and textures.

Early in childhood, Ne'eman was verbally advanced and socially isolated. Like many autistic children, he was bullied, and, in his early teens, he struggled with anxiety and would engage in self-harm by picking his skin. He had to leave the Solomon Schechter Jewish day school around the fifth grade, which distressed him. At age 12, Ne'eman was diagnosed with the now-defunct autism subtype Asperger syndrome. For a period in high school, Ne'eman went to a segregated special education school. There, he was frustrated by the segregated school because he felt it was a "day care" that focused on "normalizing" disabled students instead of challenging them academically. He said that he and his fellow students "were being written off because of what society expects of people with disabilities." Using his advocacy skills, Ne'eman was eventually able to return to a mainstream school.

This experience had a strong effect on Ne'eman's view of the world. He has said that although he himself was successful at returning to a mainstream school, "What is, I think, most frightening to me is that for many students out there that kind of message is absorbed—the idea that they are inferior is absorbed, and that can be very damaging because it really puts a limit on people's potential."

Upon graduating high school, he founded ASAN. He then attended the University of Maryland, Baltimore County where he became a member of Alpha Epsilon Pi and graduated with a bachelor's degree in Political Science as part of the Sondheim Public Affairs Scholars Program.

== Advocacy work ==
=== Founding and leading the Autistic Self Advocacy Network ===
After graduating high school, Ne'eman founded ASAN, a national advocacy organization run by and for autistic adults and youth. In February 2006, he was appointed by the Governor of New Jersey Jon Corzine to the New Jersey Special Education Review Commission, a body tasked with developing recommendations on the educational needs of disabled students in the state of New Jersey. There, he authored a minority report to the commission's main document expressing concern over the lack of substantive recommendations regarding aversives, restraint, and seclusion. In his letter to commission chair Joyce Powell, the head of the New Jersey Education Association, he noted, "It would have been our preference to find a solution in the main document to this issue. However, owing to numerous compromise proposals having been rejected, including one as basic as requiring parental consent prior to the utilization of these techniques, we feel it incumbent upon us to file a minority opinion." In the minority report, he and three other commission members argued for a total ban on aversives, restricting restraint to emergency situations only and a variety of other policy recommendations applying to public schools and other entities receiving public funds.

As ASAN president, Ne'eman continued his work against aversives, restraint, and seclusion in a variety of contexts, ranging from grassroots campaigns to comment on specific regulatory proposals. In late 2007, Ne'eman and ASAN began to focus their advocacy efforts against new targets. On November 30, Ne'eman gave public comment to the Inter-Agency Autism Coordinating Committee, a body within the Department of Health and Human Services that he would join two years later. In his remarks, Ne'eman called for a re-focusing of the autism research agenda away from the priorities of causation and cure, urged increased representation for autistic self-advocates on the Committee and condemned Autism Speaks as "morally complicit" in recent murders of autistic children, due to their Autism Every Day fundraising video.

Under his leadership, ASAN's work focused on both public policy priorities and social and cultural change. Ne'eman attracted significant public attention for ASAN's successful campaign against the New York University Child Study Center's Ransom Notes campaign and the organization's long-standing criticism of Autism Speaks. Ne'eman and ASAN have also been frequent advocates on issues like expanding access to employment supports for autistic adults, fostering greater educational inclusion for autistic youth, strengthening rights protection laws across the lifespan and other more traditional disability rights priorities. After the passage of the ADA Amendments Act of 2008, Ne'eman was one of a number of advocates specifically recognized by then House Majority leader Steny Hoyer in the Congressional Record.

On July 18, 2016, Ne'eman announced he would step down as president of ASAN and be succeeded by Julia Bascom. He subsequently joined the American Civil Liberties Union as a consultant on disability policy. As of May 2026, Ne'eman is still a member of ASAN's board of directors.

=== Other autistic advocacy ===
Ne'eman believes that society should focus on developing supports for autistic people rather than searching for a cure. He believes a cure for autism will not come anytime soon and genetic insight gained on autism may be used to develop prenatal tests for the condition that will result in the premature termination of autistic fetuses. He urges scientists researching the genetics of autism to be cautious of the ethical implications of their studies.

Ne'eman believes that social pleasantry should be eliminated as criteria for hiring and a good job evaluation.

In 2010, President Obama nominated Ne'eman to serve on the NCD. Criticism of Ne'eman's view that society should not be curing autistic people may have been a factor in the hold on his confirmation. However, Daniel Pfeiffer, then the White House Communications Director, accused Republican senators of intentionally blocking many of President Obama's nominees; in May 2010, there were 96 people waiting to be confirmed to administration posts.

In addition to serving on the NCD, Ne'eman was a public member of the Interagency Autism Coordinating Committee and a board member of TASH. He had been Vice Chair of the New Jersey Adults with Autism Task Force, and served on the New Jersey Special Education Review Committee.

Ari Ne'eman led a campaign in Washington State to get a bus advertisement removed which advocated the "wiping out" of autism.

In 2014, Ne'eman was awarded the $100,000 Ruderman prize.

Ne'eman has advised several Democratic presidential candidates on disability policy. In the 2016 election, he advised Hillary Clinton's campaign on autism and disability policy proposals. In the 2020 election, his advice was acknowledged and credited by both Bernie Sanders and Elizabeth Warren in the development of their disability plans.

ASAN was initially neutral on Kevin and Avonte's Law, which would have provided money to fight wandering behavior in autistic children, until a provision was introduced into the bill that would have allowed for tracking devices to be installed on people with disabilities that could be used for purposes other than locating them if they were lost. ASAN then opposed the bill, which failed to pass. Later, a revised version of Kevin and Avonte's Law passed which did not include the language ASAN had objected to.

Ne'eman supported the United States Food and Drug Administration's ban on electric shock devices at the Judge Rotenberg Center in 2020.

During the COVID-19 pandemic, Ne'eman advocated for the rights of disabled people to get access to necessary services, prescription drugs and lifesaving treatment when necessary. In an op-ed in The New York Times, he argued that ventilators and other scarce medical resources should not be denied on the basis of disability, provided that the care was not medically futile. Early in the pandemic, Ne'eman urged states to allow early refills on prescription drugs. He also articulated a series of recommendations to states to help ensure continuity of long-term care services for disabled people.

In 2014, Ne'eman co-founded MySupport, a technology platform that enables disabled people to find and hire support workers. MySupport was acquired by RISE Services in April 2020.

== Views on autism ==
Multiple media sources have claimed that Ne'eman sees autism as a difference as opposed to a disability. In response to those claims, Ne'eman has stated that he actually believes that autism is both a neurological difference and a disability, not a disease that should be cured. He is against what he sees as the stigmatization of autism in the media and views autistic self-advocacy as a civil rights issue. Proponents of a cure for autism, such as Cure Autism Now co-founder Jonathan Shestack, have criticized Ne'eman for his views on autism. Shestack stated in 2010, "Why people have gotten upset is, he [Ne'eman] doesn’t seem to represent, understand or have great sympathy for all the people who are truly, deeply affected in a way that he isn’t."

== Political beliefs ==
In September 2018, Ne'eman and Alex Zeldin co-wrote a guest column for The Forward in which they described themselves as "liberals" and "Zionists." The column explained that Ne'eman's Zionist beliefs were inspired by his father, who immigrated to Israel to escape antisemitic persecution in Romania.

In the column, Ne'eman and Zeldin expressed concern over the erosion of civil rights in Israel and encouraged American Jews to support Israeli social activists as an alternative to boycotting Israel. The pair also described an initiative they were launching—the Campaign for Jewish Values in the State of Israel—which would encourage temple congregants to both donate money to Israeli civil-rights groups and invest in debt securities issued by the Israeli government.

In the column, Ne'eman stated the following (em dashes added for readability):

Last year, I (Ari) stood before my congregation on Yom Kippur, proud to hold an Israel Bonds card in my hand and speak about the ways in which Israel has transformed the lives of American Jewry for the better: "We can make an unequivocal bet on America, be as Jewish and American as we want to be at the same time, because if the bet is wrong—if like Jews in Spain and Germany and Poland and Iraq and Egypt and Algeria we discover that our neighbors are not the people we thought they were—thanks to the State of Israel we will not pay for it with our lives or the lives of our children."

In 2025, Ne'eman and Zeldin appeared on the A New Union (ANU) electoral slate for the 39th World Zionist Congress. ANU collectively received 1,504 votes in advance of the congress (out of 224,969 votes), earning them the right to send one delegate. On their official website, the ANU slate members (116 in total) collectively identified themselves as millennials and members of Generation Z who were "proud Zionists." They also stated on their website and in promotional literature:

We believe that the dream of swords being turned into plowshares can only be achieved by a two-state solution that allows Israelis and Palestinians to live peacefully side-by-side, advancing our aspiration for regional peace and the full acceptance of Israel into the global community.

== Personal life ==
Ne'eman married Rabbi Ruti Regan, a rabbinic disability scholar and disability rights activist, in July 2017. The same year, Regan became the first openly autistic person to graduate from the Jewish Theological Seminary.

== See also ==
- Autistic rights movement
- Neurodiversity
