= Autistic Self Advocacy Network =

Non-profit advocacy organization by and for autistic individuals

- Founded: October 27, 2006; 20 years ago
- Founders: Ari Ne'eman and Scott Michael Robertson
- Type: Nonprofit organization
- Tax ID no.: 26-1270198
- Legal status: 501(c)(3)
- Purpose: To advance the principles of the disability rights movement with regard to autism by organizing the community of autistic adults and youth to have their voices heard in a national forum.
- Headquarters: Washington, D.C., U.S.
- Method: Publications, policy advocacy
- Executive Director: Colin Killick
- Deputy Executive Director: Avery Outlaw
- Board of directors: Sam Crane (Chairperson); Hari Srinivasan (Vice Chairperson); Meg Evans, J.D. (Secretary); Sarah Pripas-Kapit (Treasurer); Steve Lieberman; Ari Ne'eman
- Revenue: $1,755,689 (2025)
- Expenses: $2,576,594 (2025)
- Employees: 23 (2025)
- Volunteers: 50 (2025)
- Website: autisticadvocacy.org

The Autistic Self Advocacy Network (ASAN) is an American 501(c)(3) nonprofit advocacy organization run by and for autistic individuals. ASAN advocates for the inclusion of autistic people in decisions that affect them, including legislation, depiction in the media, and disability services.

The organization is based in Washington, D.C., where it advocates for the United States government to adopt legislation and policies that positively impact autistic people.

== Services ==
ASAN provides community organizing, self-advocacy support, and public policy advocacy and education for autistic youth and adults; it also works to improve the general public's understanding of autism. The organization is "run by and for autistic adults". ASAN's mission statement says that autistic people are equal to everyone else and are important and necessary members of society. ASAN also maintains a network of 25 local chapters based in different states, with three chapter affiliates in Canada and Australia.

== History ==
ASAN was co-founded on October 27, 2006, by its former president, Ari Ne'eman, and former board of trustees member and vice chair of development, Scott Michael Robertson. By 2009, ASAN had 15 chapters.

ASAN's early work mostly focused on fighting the use of aversives, restraint, and seclusion in special education; in December 2007, they spoke out publicly against Autism Speaks, and against the NYU Child Study Center's Ransom Notes ad campaign, which compared autism, ADHD, OCD, and eating disorders to kidnappers holding children hostage. This counter-campaign put ASAN on the public's radar and has been referred to as the neurodiversity movement's coming of age. As of 2012, ASAN continues to protest Autism Speaks.

On July 18, 2016, Ne'eman announced that he would resign as president of ASAN, to be replaced by Julia Bascom in early 2017.

In 2020, ASAN published a statement supporting the United States Food and Drug Administration's ban on the electric-shock devices used to torture disabled children and adults at the Judge Rotenberg Center.

Due to developing long COVID in May 2022, Bascom stepped down as executive director of ASAN at the end of 2023, appointing Avery Outlaw as interim executive director. ASAN began seeking a permanent replacement for Julia Bascom’s position, and on June 12, 2024, the organization announced that Colin Killick would become the next executive director starting November 1.

== Activism ==
ASAN promotes autism acceptance through public policy initiatives, research reform, cross-disability collaboration, community outreach, college advocacy, publishing, and employment initiatives. ASAN has also supported initiatives to raise the minimum wage. ASAN has opposed federal contractors paying disabled people sub-minimum wage in 2014. Their campaign to prevent workers from being paid sub-minimum wage by federal contractors was successful. In addition, ASAN has also been involved in helping businesses hire autistic individuals.

=== Scientific issues ===
As of 2008, ASAN is the autistic community partner for the Academic Autistic Spectrum Partnership In Research and Education (AASPIRE). The AASPIRE project brings together the academic community and the autistic community, in a research format called community-based participatory research, to develop and perform research projects relevant to the needs of autistic adults.

ASAN has been critical of statements made that falsely link vaccines and autism. According to ASAN, research suggests that autism has always existed at its current levels in the population.

Between 2009 and 2012, ASAN members lobbied the American Psychiatric Association's workgroup on neurodevelopmental disorders drafting new diagnostic criteria for autism for the fifth edition of the Diagnostic and Statistical Manual of Mental Disorders (DSM-5). The advocates focused on "protecting access to diagnosis" and support, blocking proposals they deemed harmful, and "improving disparities in diagnosis for marginalized groups", while encouraging the shift towards a unified diagnosis of autism spectrum disorder. A formulation proposed by ASAN regarding the possibility that some autistic people learn to mask autistic characteristics (which requires significant mental effort and makes diagnosis more difficult) is reflected in the final criteria.

In 2018, ASAN published an open letter to the American Speech–Language–Hearing Association opposing their position statement that facilitated communication (FC) and rapid prompting method (RPM) are scientifically discredited, claiming that more research on those methods is worthwhile.

=== Special calendar events ===
ASAN's chapters work collaboratively with the national branch on nationwide projects; an example of this is Day of Mourning, an event on March 1 where local chapters of ASAN, as well as independent groups, host candlelight vigils in remembrance of disabled people murdered by their caregivers. The first campaign was suggested by Zoe Gross of California, who had heard of a case where a young autistic man was murdered by his mother, who later committed suicide. The vigils honor people with all kinds of disabilities.

In April 2013, as part of Autism Acceptance Month – a counter-movement against the cure-focused Light It Up Blue and Autism Awareness Month movements – ASAN launched an Autism Acceptance Month website.

=== Publications ===
In 2011, ASAN published a book for autistic college students, called Navigating College Handbook. The book was considered "the first of its kind". In 2012, ASAN began the annual Autism Campus Inclusion (ACI) Summer Institute, a week-long workshop teaching autistic students to engage in activism and advocacy on their campuses. Disability rights activist Ly Xīnzhèn M. Zhǎngsūn Brown is a graduate of the leadership program.

The Loud Hands Project, a transmedia publishing effort for curating and hosting submissions by autistic people about voice, has also been active during 2012, in the form of a kickstarter campaign and an anthology, both founded and organized by Julia Bascom. Later in 2012, ASAN also published the anthology Loud Hands: Autistic People, Speaking, which features several dozen essays by autistic neurodiversity activists, including Jim Sinclair and Ari Ne'eman.

=== Work with Sesame Workshop ===
In 2015, ASAN worked with Sesame Workshop to create an autistic character for Sesame Street, named Julia. In August 2019, ASAN announced it had ended its partnership with Sesame Street after it began to associate with Autism Speaks. ASAN described the materials produced by association with Autism Speaks as "incredibly harmful information [mixed] with useful information with little to no distinction", including theories and narratives about autism that are not scientifically supported, and medical advice not backed by scientific research. ASAN reports that it discussed the harmful implications of these ideas with the producers of Sesame Street, and that the producers acknowledged that the ideas were harmful but would not reconsider their collaboration with Autism Speaks.

=== Opposition to Kevin and Avonte's Law ===
ASAN opposed Kevin and Avonte's Law, which would have provided money to fight wandering behavior in autistic children. ASAN was originally neutral, but after several modifications were made, including an amendment that would have allowed for the installation of tracking devices on people with disabilities, ASAN and several other disability rights groups opposed the proposed law over privacy concerns. Additionally, Ne'eman said that "The use of the 'wandering' label on adults will enable abuse and restrict the civil rights of Americans with Disabilities" and that it would "make it easier for school districts and residential facilities to justify restraint and seclusion in the name of treatment." As a result, Congress did not pass Kevin and Avonte's Law. Later, a revised version of Kevin and Avonte's Law was passed which did not include the language ASAN had objected to.

== Protests ==
In 2013, a local ASAN chapter successfully protested for the removal of billboards by the Seattle Children's Hospital that advocated "wiping out" autism. The protest was followed by numerous media requests to the chapter regarding the autism rights movement. Arzu Forough of the organization Washington Autism Alliance & Advocacy claimed that coverage could have misled people about the effects of autism. According to Forough, such coverage could promote the idea that autistic people have only trivial difficulties, obscuring the level of support that some autistic people need.

=== Autism Speaks ===
ASAN has protested Autism Speaks for promoting policies that are harmful to autistic people, for promoting stigma against autistic people, and for systematically excluding autistic people from debates about issues that affect them.

In 2009, ASAN and over 60 other disability advocacy groups condemned Autism Speaks for a lack of representation and for exploitative and unethical practices. In December 2015, Autism Speaks committed to provide better representation by appointing two autistic people to its 26-member board of directors. ASAN criticized this move as insufficient, citing: continued systematic exclusion of autistic people from positions of leadership at Autism Speaks; continued misuse of funds, particularly to support research for a cure rather than to support for autistic people; and continued use of harmful messages in advertising campaigns designed to promote stigma against autistic people. ASAN stated: "Until Autism Speaks makes significant changes to their practices and policies of fighting against the existence of autistic people, these appointments to the board are superficial changes."

On April 17, 2025, ASAN released a joint statement with Autism Speaks and four other organizations, criticizing the Trump administration's policies they highlighted as negatively impacting the autistic community, including the perpetuation of stigma, the promotion of the debunked theory that vaccines make people autistic, and funding cuts to healthcare, housing, and education. ASAN accepted additional signatories to the statement on a rolling basis. Between July and September 2026, ASAN collaborated with Autism Speaks and several other organizations (including the Profound Autism Alliance, the National Council on Severe Autism, and the Autism Science Foundation) on three additional joint statements concerning the operations of the Interagency Autism Coordinating Committee. The Autism Science Foundation had publicly refused to endorse the April 2025 statement because they believed its contents discouraged research into autism prevention.

== See also ==
- Controversies in autism
- List of autism-related topics
