= 2016–17 French Guiana Division d'Honneur =

French Guiana Division d'Honneur
- Season: 2016–17
- Champions: Matoury; Rémire
- CFU Club Championship: Matoury; Rémire
- Biggest home win: Matoury 9–1 Macouria (5 Jan. 2017)
- Biggest away win: Olympique 0–9 Matoury (22 Dec. 2016)
- Highest scoring: Matoury 9–1 Macouria (5 Jan. 2017)
- All statistics correct as of 1 May 2017.

The 2016–17 French Guiana Honor Division was the 56th season of the French Guiana Division d'Honneur, the top tier of football in French Guiana. The season began on 15 September 2016, with Remire taking a 3–0 win over Kouroucien. The final game of the regular season was on 19 March 2017 with Cayenne beating Grand Santi, 1–0.

Matoury entered the season as the defending champions, and were successfully able to defend their title.

== Teams ==
There were 12 clubs that competed during the season.

Team	Home city	Home ground
Agouado	Apatou	Stade de Moutendé
Cayenne	Cayenne	Stade Georges Chaumet
Cosma Foot	Saint-Laurent-du-Maroni	Stade Rene Long
Etoile Matoury	Matoury	Stade Municipal Matoury
Grand Santi	Mana	Stade Guy Mariette
Le Geldar	Kourou	Stade Bois Chaudat
Olympique Cayenne	Cayenne	Stade Georges Chaumet
Kourou	Kourou	Stade Bois Chaudat
Kouroucien	Kourou	Stade Bois Chaudat
Macouria	Macouria	Stade Municipal Macouria
Matoury	Matoury	Stade Municipal Matoury
Rémire	Remire-Montjoly	Stade Edmard Lama

== Table ==
Pos	Team	Pld	W	D	L	GF	GA	GD	Pts	Qualification or relegation
1	US Matoury	22	16	3	3	67	21	+46	73	Champions
2	ASC Remire	22	14	3	5	48	31	+17	67	
3	ASC Le Geldar	22	12	5	5	52	21	+31	62 (Note: 1 point deducted)	
4	CSC de Cayenne	22	12	4	6	41	39	+2	61	
5	ASC Agouado	22	11	5	6	49	35	+14	58 (Note: 2 points deducted)	
6	AS Etoile Matoury	22	9	8	5	36	23	+13	57	
7	Kourou FC	22	10	4	8	43	32	+11	56	
8	ASU Grand Santi	22	10	3	9	32	29	+3	47 (Note: 8 points deducted)	
9	SC Kouroucien	22	6	3	13	37	54	−17	42	
10	Olympique de Cayenne	22	4	2	16	30	68	−38	36	Relegation Playoff
11	US Macouria	22	4	2	16	23	78	−55	34	Relegated
12	Cosma Foot	22	2	2	18	15	42	−27	28	Relegated

Notes:

Note: various clubs have points deducted, mostly due to forfeiting matches
