= 2021–22 Coupe de France preliminary rounds, overseas departments and territories =

The 2021–22 Coupe de France preliminary rounds, overseas departments and territories made up the qualifying competition to decide which teams from the French Overseas Departments and Territories took part in the main competition from the seventh round.

A total of eleven clubs qualified from the overseas leagues, two each from Guadeloupe, French Guiana, Martinique, Réunion, and one each from Mayotte, New Caledonia and Tahiti. In 2020–21 Club Franciscain from Martinique survived longest in the competition, beating a number of overseas clubs in playoff rounds to reach the round of 32, equalling the record for an overseas team's progression in the competition. They eventually lost to Ligue 1 club Angers.

== Mayotte ==
A total of 80 teams from the four division of the Mayotte league entered the competition. The preliminary round draw was published on 11 June 2021, with 16 (Note: M'Tsanga 2000 withdrew from the competition, giving FC Shingabwé an additional bye into the second round.) ties between clubs from Régional 4, the lowest division, and one team exempt to the first round.

A second preliminary round draw was due to be published in early July, but on 6 July 2021 the league announced that all teams would be qualified directly for the first round. The first round draw, including the remaining clubs, was published on 22 July 2021.

The round of 32 was drawn on 20 August 2021, originally to be played on 4 September 2021. The round of 16 and quarter final draws were published on 15 September 2021. The semi-final draw was published on 1 October 2021.

=== Preliminary round (Mayotte) ===
These matches were played on 27 June 2021.

preliminary round results: Mayotte
Tie no	Home team (tier)	Score	Away team (tier)
1.	(Mayotte) Espoir Mtsapéré (R4)	3–2	ACSJ M'Liha (R4) (Mayotte)
2.	(Mayotte) FC du Sud (R4)	2–0	CJ Mronabéja (R4) (Mayotte)
3.	(Mayotte) Flamme d'Hajangoua (R4)	3–1	US Mtsangamboua (R4) (Mayotte)
4.	(Mayotte) Trévansi SC Tahity (R4)	1–2	AS Kahani (R4) (Mayotte)
5.	(Mayotte) Maharavo FC (R4)	5–1	US Mtsamoudou (R4) (Mayotte)
6.	(Mayotte) FC Bouyouni (R4)	0–3 (Note: Tie won by means of forfeit.)	USJ Tsararano (R4) (Mayotte)
7.	(Mayotte) Feu du Centre (R4)	2–2 (a.e.t.) (4–3 p)	Espoir Club de Longoni (R4) (Mayotte)
8.	(Mayotte) FC Ylang de Koungou (R4)	5–1	Étoile de Hapandzo (R4) (Mayotte)
9.	(Mayotte) ACSJ Alakarabu (R4)	3–1	Voulvavi Sport & Culture (R4) (Mayotte)
10.	(Mayotte) ASCEE Nyambadao (R4)	2–0 (a.e.t.)	AS Ongojou (R4) (Mayotte)
11.	(Mayotte) AS Papillon d'Honneur (R4)	0–3	Tornade Club de Majicavo-Lamir (R4) (Mayotte)
12.	(Mayotte) FMJ Vahibé (R4)	2–1	Lance Missile (R4) (Mayotte)
13.	(Mayotte) FC Passi M'Bouini (R4)	1–3	US d'Acoua (R4) (Mayotte)
14.	(Mayotte) CS M'ramadoudou (R4)	1–4	FC Mtsankandro (R4) (Mayotte)
15.	(Mayotte) US Bandréle (R4)	0–1	FCO Tsingoni (R4) (Mayotte)

Note: Mayotte League structure (no promotion to French League structure):
Régionale 1 (R1)
Régionale 2 (R2)
Régionale 3 (R3)
Régionale 4 (R4)

=== First round (Mayotte) ===
These matches were played on 7 and 8 August 2021, with one postponed until 18 September 2021.

First round results: Mayotte
Tie no	Home team (tier)	Score	Away team (tier)
1.	(Mayotte) Racine du Nord (R3)	4–3	US Ouangani (R3) (Mayotte)
2.	(Mayotte) VSS Hagnoudrou (R3)	1–2	Enfants de Mayotte (R2)
3.	(Mayotte) FC Labattoir (R2)	0–1	AS Neige (R2) (Mayotte)
4.	(Mayotte) FCO Tsingoni (R4)	1–3	AOE Chiconi (R3) (Mayotte)
5.	(Mayotte) Foudre 2000 (R2)	2–0	AS Bandraboua (R1) (Mayotte)
6.	(Mayotte) Miracle du Sud (R3)	3–1	AJ Mtsahara (R3) (Mayotte)
7.	(Mayotte) FC Chiconi (R3)	3–2	AS Kahani (R4) (Mayotte)
8.	(Mayotte) Flamme d'Hajangoua (R4)	1–5	AS Defense de Kawéni (R2) (Mayotte)
9.	(Mayotte) FC Kani-Bé (R3)	5–0	Choungui FC (R3) (Mayotte)
10.	(Mayotte) Mahabou SC (R3)	5–1	ASC Wahadi (R3) (Mayotte)
11.	(Mayotte) VCO Vahibé (R3)	2–1 (a.e.t.)	ACSJ Alakarabu (R4) (Mayotte)
12.	(Mayotte) Feu du Centre (R4)	2–2 (a.e.t.) (4–2 p)	FMJ Vahibé (R4) (Mayotte)
13.	(Mayotte) FC Ylang de Koungou (R4)	5–3	N'Drema Club (R3) (Mayotte)
14.	(Mayotte) ASCEE Nyambadao (R4)	1–3	US Kavani (R3) (Mayotte)
15.	(Mayotte) USJ Tsararano (R4)	3–1	FC Shingabwé (R4) (Mayotte)
16.	(Mayotte) Espérance d'Iloni (R3)	1–1 (2–1 p)	ASJ Moinatrindri (R1) (Mayotte)
17.	(Mayotte) RC Barakani (R3)	1–2	Diables Noirs (R1) (Mayotte)
18.	(Mayotte) Maharavo FC (R4)	4–2	FC Mtsankandro (R4) (Mayotte)
19.	(Mayotte) Olympique de Miréréni (R2)	2–1	AJ Kani-Kéli (R2) (Mayotte)
20.	(Mayotte) ASC Abeilles (R2)	3–1	FC Mtsapéré (R1) (Mayotte)
21.	(Mayotte) TCO Mamoudzou (R3)	1–0	USC Labattoir (R3) (Mayotte)
22.	(Mayotte) Etincelles Hamjago (R3)	0–3	AS Jumeaux de M'zouazia (R1) (Mayotte)
23.	(Mayotte) Tornade Club de Majicavo-Lamir (R4)	1–0	USC Kangani (R2) (Mayotte)
24.	(Mayotte) Enfant du Port (R3)	2–3	AS Rosador (R1) (Mayotte)
25.	(Mayotte) Espoir Mtsapéré (R4)	1–2	FC Dembeni (R2) (Mayotte)
26.	(Mayotte) Pamandzi SC (R3)	2–0	USC Anteou Poroani (R1) (Mayotte)
27.	(Mayotte) FC Sohoa (R3)	0–1	AS Sada (R1) (Mayotte)
28.	(Mayotte) ASJ Handréma (R3)	3–2	Tchanga SC (R1) (Mayotte)
29.	(Mayotte) US D'Acoua (R4)	1–1 (a.e.t.) (4–2 p) (Note: US D'Acoua penalised for including a suspended player on the teamsheet. Bandrélé FC qualify.)	Bandrélé FC (R2) (Mayotte)
30.	(Mayotte) FC Majicavo (R2)	1–3	USCJ Koungou (R1) (Mayotte)
31.	(Mayotte) RC Tsimkoura (R4)	1–5 (Note: ASC Kaweni initially penalised, reason unknown. Overturned on appeal)	ASC Kaweni (R1) (Mayotte)
32.	(Mayotte) FC du Sud (R4)	0–3	UCS Sada (R1) (Mayotte)

Note: Mayotte League structure (no promotion to French League structure):
Régionale 1 (R1)
Régionale 2 (R2)
Régionale 3 (R3)
Régionale 4 (R4)

=== Round of 32 (Mayotte) ===
These matches were played on 11 and 12 September 2021, with one postponed until 22 September 2021.

Round of 32 results: Mayotte
Tie no	Home team (tier)	Score	Away team (tier)
1.	(Mayotte) FC Kani-Bé (R3)	2–3	Diables Noirs (R1) (Mayotte)
2.	(Mayotte) Feu du Centre (R4)	0–0 (a.e.t.) (4–5 p)	Miracle du Sud (R3) (Mayotte)
3.	(Mayotte) FC Chiconi (R3)	2–3	AS Rosador (R1) (Mayotte)
4.	(Mayotte) AS Jumeaux de M'zouazia (R1)	4–0	AS Neige (R2) (Mayotte)
5.	(Mayotte) Mahabou SC (R3)	3–2	Racine du Nord (R3) (Mayotte)
6.	Enfants de Mayotte (R2)	1–1 (a.e.t.) (1–3 p)	AS Sada (R1) (Mayotte)
7.	(Mayotte) Pamandzi SC (R3)	3–1 (a.e.t.)	VCO Vahibé (R3) (Mayotte)
8.	(Mayotte) USCJ Koungou (R1)	1–0	Olympique de Miréréni (R2) (Mayotte)
9.	(Mayotte) AS Defense de Kawéni (R2)	2–1	Espérance d'Iloni (R3) (Mayotte)
10.	(Mayotte) US Kavani (R3)	2–0	ASC Abeilles (R2) (Mayotte)
11.	(Mayotte) Maharavo FC (R4)	0–2	UCS Sada (R1) (Mayotte)
12.	(Mayotte) Tornade Club de Majicavo-Lamir (R4)	1–2 (Note: Tornade Club de Majicavo-Lamir penalised, Foudre 2000 qualify. Reason unknown.)	Foudre 2000 (R2) (Mayotte)
13.	(Mayotte) USJ Tsararano (R4)	1–2	Bandrélé FC (R2) (Mayotte)
14.	(Mayotte) ASJ Handréma (R3)	1–0	ASC Kaweni (R1) (Mayotte)
15.	(Mayotte) FC Ylang de Koungou (R4)	0–5	AOE Chiconi (R3) (Mayotte)
16.	(Mayotte) FC Dembeni (R2)	1–0	TCO Mamoudzou (R3) (Mayotte)

Note: Mayotte League structure (no promotion to French League structure):
Régionale 1 (R1)
Régionale 2 (R2)
Régionale 3 (R3)
Régionale 4 (R4)

=== Round of 16 (Mayotte) ===
These matches were played on 25 September 2021, with one postponed until 2 October 2021.

Round of 16 results: Mayotte
Tie no	Home team (tier)	Score	Away team (tier)
1.	(Mayotte) AS Rosador (R1)	1–0	Diables Noirs (R1) (Mayotte)
2.	(Mayotte) Bandrélé FC (R2)	0–1 (Note: Tie reversed from original draw.)	AS Jumeaux de M'zouazia (R1) (Mayotte)
3.	(Mayotte) Miracle du Sud (R3)	4–2	Foudre 2000 (Mayotte)
4.	(Mayotte) FC Dembeni (R2)	2–0	Mahabou SC (R3) (Mayotte)
5.	(Mayotte) AS Sada (R1)	3–1	USCJ Koungou (R1) (Mayotte)
6.	(Mayotte) US Kavani (R3)	0–1	UCS Sada (R1) (Mayotte)
7.	(Mayotte) ASJ Handréma (R3)	0–0 (5–3 p)	AS Defense de Kawéni (R2) (Mayotte)
8.	(Mayotte) AOE Chiconi (R3)	2–2 (4–3 p) (Note: AOE Chiconi penalised, Pamandzi SC qualify.)	Pamandzi SC (R3) (Mayotte)

Note: Mayotte League structure (no promotion to French League structure):
Régionale 1 (R1)
Régionale 2 (R2)
Régionale 3 (R3)
Régionale 4 (R4)

=== Quarter final (Mayotte) ===
These matches were played on 2 October 2021, with one postponed until 9 October 2021.

Quarter Final: Mayotte
Tie no	Home team (tier)	Score	Away team (tier)
1.	(Mayotte) Miracle du Sud (R3)	0–4	AS Rosador (R1) (Mayotte)
2.	(Mayotte) Pamandzi SC (R3)	2–3	FC Dembeni (R2) (Mayotte)
3.	(Mayotte) UCS Sada (R1)	2–0	AS Sada (R1) (Mayotte)
4.	(Mayotte) ASJ Handréma (R3)	0–1	AS Jumeaux de M'zouazia (R1) (Mayotte)

Note: Mayotte League structure (no promotion to French League structure):
Régionale 1 (R1)
Régionale 2 (R2)
Régionale 3 (R3)
Régionale 4 (R4)

=== Semi final (Mayotte) ===
These matches were played on 19 October 2021.

Semi Final: Mayotte
Tie no	Home team (tier)	Score	Away team (tier)
1.	(Mayotte) AS Rosador (R1)	4–1	FC Dembeni (R2) (Mayotte)
2.	(Mayotte) AS Jumeaux de M'zouazia (R1)	2–0 (Note: Tie reversed from original draw.)	UCS Sada (R1) (Mayotte)

Note: Mayotte League structure (no promotion to French League structure):
Régionale 1 (R1)
Régionale 2 (R2)
Régionale 3 (R3)
Régionale 4 (R4)

=== Final (Mayotte) ===
This match was played on 30 October 2021.

Final: Mayotte
Tie no	Home team (tier)	Score	Away team (tier)
1.	(Mayotte) AS Rosador (R1)	0–4	AS Jumeaux de M'zouazia (R1) (Mayotte)

Note: Mayotte League structure (no promotion to French League structure):
Régionale 1 (R1)
Régionale 2 (R2)
Régionale 3 (R3)
Régionale 4 (R4)

== Réunion ==
As was the case last season, just sixteen teams were entered into the draw, all from Régionale 1, the top division of the Réunion football league. The calendar, comprising three qualifying rounds (named fourth, fifth and sixth) was published in May 2021.

The fourth round draw was made on 13 July 2021.

=== Fourth round (Réunion) ===
These matches were played on 18 and 28 July 2021, and 7 September 2021.

Fourth round results: Réunion
Tie no	Home team (tier)	Score	Away team (tier)
1.	(Réunion) JS Saint-Pierroise (R1)	3–0 (Note: Tie won by means of forfeit)	Saint Denis EDFA (R1)
2.	(Réunion) La Tamponnaise (R1)	0–0 (3–4 p)	ASC Makes (R1) (Réunion)
3.	(Réunion) SS Jeanne d'Arc (R1)	0–0 (2–1 p)	ACF Piton Saint-Leu (R1) (Réunion)
4.	(Réunion) AS Capricorne (R1)	2–0	AF Saint-Louisien (R1) (Réunion)
5.	(Réunion) AS Excelsior (R1)	2–0	FC Parfin Saint-André (R1) (Réunion)
6.	(Réunion) Saint-Denis FC (R1)	0–0 (5–4 p)	AS Bretagne (R1) (Réunion)
7.	(Réunion) Trois Bassins FC (R1)	3–0	AS Marsouins (R1) (Réunion)
8.	(Réunion) US Sainte-Marienne (R1)	1–1 (1–3 p)	Saint-Pauloise FC (R1) (Réunion)

Note: Reúnion League structure (no promotion to French League structure):
Régionale 1 (R1)
Régionale 2 (R2)

=== Fifth round (Réunion) ===
These matches were played on 29 September 2021.

Fifth round results: Réunion
Tie no	Home team (tier)	Score	Away team (tier)
1.	(Réunion) JS Saint-Pierroise (R1)	3–0	AS Capricorne (R1) (Réunion)
2.	(Réunion) ASC Makes (R1)	1–0	SS Jeanne d'Arc (R1) (Réunion)
3.	(Réunion) Trois Bassins FC (R1)	1–1 (2–3 p)	AS Excelsior (R1) (Réunion)
4.	(Réunion) Saint-Denis FC (R1)	2–1	Saint-Pauloise FC (R1) (Réunion)

Note: Reúnion League structure (no promotion to French League structure):
Régionale 1 (R1)
Régionale 2 (R2)

=== Sixth round (Réunion) ===
These matches were played on 23 and 24 October 2021.

Sixth round results: Réunion
Tie no	Home team (tier)	Score	Away team (tier)
1.	(Réunion) JS Saint-Pierroise (R1)	0–1	ASC Makes (R1) (Réunion)
2.	(Réunion) AS Excelsior (R1)	2–3	Saint-Denis FC (R1) (Réunion)

Note: Reúnion League structure (no promotion to French League structure):
Régionale 1 (R1)
Régionale 2 (R2)

== French Guiana ==
A total of 33 teams from the two divisions of the French Guiana league entered the competition. This required a single-fixture round to take place before the first full round. The round naming convention used by the league aligns with those used for the mainland competition, so this competition starts with the second round. The draw for both second and third rounds was published on 9 October 2021.

=== Second round (French Guiana) ===
This match was played on 16 October 2021.

Second round results: French Guiana
Tie no	Home team (tier)	Score	Away team (tier)
1.	(French Guiana) ASC Karib (R1)	1–1 (4–2 p)	SC Kouroucien (R1) (French Guiana)

Note: French Guiana League structure (no promotion to French League structure):
Régional 1 (R1)
Régional 2 (R2)

=== Third round (French Guiana) ===
These matches were played on 16 and 23 October 2021.

Third round results: French Guiana
Tie no	Home team (tier)	Score	Away team (tier)
1.	(French Guiana) US Sinnamary (R1)	3–0 (Note: Tie won by means of forfeit.)	US Macouria (R2) (French Guiana)
2.	(French Guiana) AJ Balata Abriba (R2)	1–4	ASC Kawina (none) (French Guiana)
3.	(French Guiana) ASC Rémire (R1)	5–3	USC Montsinéry-Tonnegrande (R1) (French Guiana)
4.	(French Guiana) RC Maroni (*)	4–4 (7–8 p)	FC Family (none) (French Guiana)
5.	(French Guiana) ASL Sport Guyanais (R2)	3–0	Kourou FC (R2) (French Guiana)
6.	(French Guiana) EF Iracoubo (R1)	2–2 (1–3 p)	ASC Armire (R2) (French Guiana)
7.	(French Guiana) FC Oyapock (R1)	1–2	ASC Agouado (R1) (French Guiana)
8.	(French Guiana) USL Montjoly (R2)	4–4 (5–4 p)	USC De Roura (R2) (French Guiana)
9.	(French Guiana) ASCS Maripasoula (none)	3–0	Cosma Foot (R2) (French Guiana)
10.	(French Guiana) AJ Saint-Georges (R1)	0–5	US de Matoury (R1) (French Guiana)
11.	(French Guiana) ASE Matoury (R1)	1–1 (4–2 p)	ASC Karib (R1) (French Guiana)
12.	(French Guiana) Loyola OC (R1)	2–1	Olympique Cayenne (R1) (French Guiana)
13.	(French Guiana) ASU Grand Santi (R1)	3–0	US Saint-Élie (R2) (French Guiana)
14.	(French Guiana) CSC Cayenne (R1)	1–0	Le Geldar De Kourou (R1) (French Guiana)
15.	(French Guiana) ASC Ouest (R1)	3–0	Dynamo De Soula (R2) (French Guiana)
16.	(French Guiana) ASC Arc-en-Ciel (R2)	0–3	Yana Sport Elite Academy (R2) (French Guiana)

Note: French Guiana League structure (no promotion to French League structure):
Régional 1 (R1)
Régional 2 (R2)

=== Fourth round (French Guiana) ===
These matches were played on 23 and 30 October 2021.

Fourth round results: French Guiana
Tie no	Home team (tier)	Score	Away team (tier)
1.	(French Guiana) ASC Agouado (R1)	3–1	FC Family (none) (French Guiana)
2.	(French Guiana) USL Montjoly (R2)	0–4	US Sinnamary (R1) (French Guiana)
3.	(French Guiana) ASC Kawina (none)	7–2 (Note: Tie reversed from original draw.)	ASCS Maripasoula (none) (French Guiana)
4.	(French Guiana) US de Matoury (R1)	1–1 (0–3 p)	ASU Grand Santi (R1) (French Guiana)
5.	(French Guiana) ASE Matoury (R1)	4–1	Loyola OC (R1) (French Guiana)
6.	(French Guiana) ASC Armire (R2)	1–1 (3–4 p)	CSC Cayenne (R1) (French Guiana)
7.	(French Guiana) ASL Sport Guyanais (R2)	1–6	ASC Rémire (R1) (French Guiana)
8.	(French Guiana) Yana Sport Elite Academy (R2)	1–7	ASC Ouest (R1) (French Guiana)

Note: French Guiana League structure (no promotion to French League structure):
Régional 1 (R1)
Régional 2 (R2)

=== Fifth round (French Guiana) ===
These matches were played on 3 November 2021.

Fifth round results: French Guiana
Tie no	Home team (tier)	Score	Away team (tier)
1.	(French Guiana) ASC Ouest (R1)	0–0 (5–4 p) (Note: Tie reversed from original draw.)	ASC Kawina (none) (French Guiana)
2.	(French Guiana) ASC Rémire (R1)	2–1	ASC Agouado (R1) (French Guiana)
3.	(French Guiana) CSC Cayenne (R1)	3–1	US Sinnamary (R1) (French Guiana)
4.	(French Guiana) ASU Grand Santi (R1)	3–1	ASE Matoury (R1) (French Guiana)

Note: French Guiana League structure (no promotion to French League structure):
Régional 1 (R1)
Régional 2 (R2)

=== Sixth round (French Guiana) ===
These matches were played on 6 November 2021.

Sixth round results: French Guiana
Tie no	Home team (tier)	Score	Away team (tier)
1.	(French Guiana) ASC Ouest (R1)	1–1 (4–3 p)	ASC Rémire (R1) (French Guiana)
2.	(French Guiana) CSC Cayenne (R1)	1–1 (9–8 p)	ASU Grand Santi (R1) (French Guiana)

Note: French Guiana League structure (no promotion to French League structure):
Régional 1 (R1)
Régional 2 (R2)

== Martinique ==
Due to the continuing COVID-19 pandemic in Martinique, football in the territory was still suspended in mid-October. In order to participate in the main competition, the Martinique Football League were informed by the FFF on 11 October 2021 that they must conclude the qualifying competition by 15 November 2021. On 19 October, the league published plans for an eight-team competition, starting on 3 November.

=== Fifth round (Martinique) ===
The opening round, titled Quarter final by the league, is analogous to the fifth round of the main competition. These matches were played on 30 and 31 October 2021.

Fifth round results: Martinique
Tie no	Home team (tier)	Score	Away team (tier)
1.	(Martinique) Golden Lion FC (R1)	2–0	Aiglon du Lamentin (R1) (Martinique)
2.	(Martinique) RC Saint-Joseph (R1)	0–3	Club Colonial (R1) (Martinique)
3.	(Martinique) Assaut de Saint-Pierre (R1)	1–1 (3–1 p)	Essor-Préchotain (R1) (Martinique)
4.	(Martinique) AS Samaritaine (R1)	1–4	Club Franciscain (R1) (Martinique)

Note: Martinique League structure (no promotion to French League structure):All teams are from Régionale 1 (R1)

=== Sixth round (Martinique) ===
These matches were played on 6 and 7 November 2021.

Sixth round results: Martinique
Tie no	Home team (tier)	Score	Away team (tier)
1.	(Martinique) Club Colonial (R1)	1–0	Golden Lion FC (R1) (Martinique)
2.	(Martinique) Club Franciscain (R1)	1–0	Assaut de Saint-Pierre (R1) (Martinique)

== Guadeloupe ==
Due to the continuing COVID-19 pandemic in Guadeloupe, football in the territory was still suspended in mid-October. In order to allow two teams to join the main competition in November, the Guadeloupe Football League announced on 18 October 2021, via their Facebook page, an eight-team qualifying competition starting on 30 October 2021.

=== Fifth round (Guadeloupe) ===
The opening round is analogous to the fifth round of the main competition. These matches were played on 30 and 31 October 2021.

Fifth round results: Guadeloupe
Tie no	Home team (tier)	Score	Away team (tier)
1.	(Guadeloupe) Jeunesse Evolution (R1)	4–1	Red Star (R1) (Guadeloupe)
2.	(Guadeloupe) Solidarité-Scolaire (R1)	4–0	Phare du Canal (R1) (Guadeloupe)
3.	(Guadeloupe) Unité Sainte-Rosienne (R1)	0–1	ASG Juventus de Sainte-Anne (R1) (Guadeloupe)
4.	(Guadeloupe) AS Gosier (R1)	1–1 (3–2 p)	CS Moulien (R1) (Guadeloupe)

=== Sixth round (Guadeloupe) ===
These matches were played on 6 and 7 November 2021.

Sixth round results: Guadeloupe
Tie no	Home team (tier)	Score	Away team (tier)
1.	(Guadeloupe) Jeunesse Evolution (R1)	0–2	Solidarité-Scolaire (R1) (Guadeloupe)
2.	(Guadeloupe) ASG Juventus de Sainte-Anne (R1)	0–3	AS Gosier (R1) (Guadeloupe)

== Saint Pierre and Miquelon ==
The Overseas Collectivity of Saint Pierre and Miquelon had only three teams, so there was just one match in each of two rounds, with one team receiving a bye to the second round. The first round took place on 7 July 2021, and the second round took place on 24 July 2021. The winner gained entry to the third round draw of the Pays de la Loire region.

=== First round (Saint Pierre and Miquelon) ===
The match was played on 7 July 2021.

First round results: Saint Pierre and Miquelon
Tie no	Home team (tier)	Score	Away team (tier)
1.	(Saint Pierre and Miquelon) A.S. Saint Pierraise	2–1	A.S. Îlienne Amateur (Saint Pierre and Miquelon)

=== Second round (Saint Pierre and Miquelon) ===
The match was played on 24 July 2021.

Second round results: Saint Pierre and Miquelon
Tie no	Home team (tier)	Score	Away team (tier)
1.	(Saint Pierre and Miquelon) A.S. Saint Pierraise	2–1	A.S. Miquelonnaise (Saint Pierre and Miquelon)

== See also ==
- Overseas France teams in the main competition of the Coupe de France
