= 2023–24 Coupe de France preliminary rounds, overseas departments and territories =

Football tournament round

The 2023–24 Coupe de France preliminary rounds, overseas departments and territories make up the qualifying competition to decide which teams from the French Overseas Departments and Territories take part in the main competition from the seventh round.

A total of eleven clubs will qualify from the overseas leagues section of the 2023–24 Coupe de France preliminary rounds, two each from Guadeloupe, French Guiana, Martinique, Réunion, and one each from Mayotte, New Caledonia and Tahiti.

In 2022–23, La Tamponnaise from Réunion made it to the round of 64, losing to RC Grasse 1–0 on the mainland.

== Mayotte ==
On 9 May 2023, the Mayotte league announced that 85 teams had entered the competition, of which 39 teams from the lowest division, Régionale 4, had been included in the draw for the tour de cadrage (framing round), with one team given a bye. The second and third round draws were published on 30 May 2023, with the teams from the second and third tier divisions joining at the second round stage and the teams from the first tier joining at the third round stage. In the second round, 25 ties were drawn, and four teams were given byes. In the third round, 9 ties were drawn with the remaining 23 teams given byes. In early July the third round was redrawn. The round of 32 was published on 25 July 2023, with all teams remaining now participating in a straight knock-out competition. The draw for the remaining rounds was published on 23 August 2023.

=== Framing round (Mayotte) ===
These matches were played on 14 May 2023. Espoir Mtsapéré were drawn to receive a bye to the next round.

Framing round results: Mayotte
Tie no	Home team (Tier)	Score	Away team (Tier)
1.	(Mayotte) Tornade Club de Majicavo-Lamir (R4)	2–0	FC Bambo (R4) (Mayotte)
2.	(Mayotte) US d'Acoua (R4)	0–3	AS Papillon d'Honneur (R4) (Mayotte)
3.	(Mayotte) FC Passi M'Bouini (R4)	1–3	US Ouangani (R4) (Mayotte)
4.	(Mayotte) USJ Tsararano (R4)	0–1	FC Shingabwé (R4) (Mayotte)
5.	(Mayotte) Enfant du Port (R4)	2–2 (3–5 p)	M'Tsamboro FC (R4) (Mayotte)
6.	(Mayotte) ASSO Club Mirereni (R4)	1–0	ASCEE Nyambadao (R4) (Mayotte)
7.	(Mayotte) RC Tsimkoura (R4)	0–1	RCES Poroani (R4) (Mayotte)
8.	(Mayotte) Voulvavi Sport & Culture (R4)	3–0 (Note: Tie won by means of forfeit.)	Maharavo FC (R4) (Mayotte)
9.	(Mayotte) Ouvoimoja FC (R4)	1–3	Trévani SC (R4) (Mayotte)
10.	(Mayotte) CJ Mronabéja (R4)	0–2	USC Labattoir (R4) (Mayotte)
11.	(Mayotte) Flamme d'Hajangoua (R4)	2–3	USC Kangani (R4) (Mayotte)
12.	(Mayotte) Pamandzi SC (R4)	3–0	Association Himidiya (R4) (Mayotte)
13.	(Mayotte) US Mtsangamboua (R4)	0–4	AS Ongojou (R4) (Mayotte)
14.	(Mayotte) ÉF Papillon Bleu (R4)	2–2 (3–4 p)	Lance Missile (R4) (Mayotte)
15.	(Mayotte) ASC Wahadi (R4)	1–3	Feu du Centre (R4) (Mayotte)
16.	(Mayotte) RC Barakani (R4)	3–1	FCO Tsingoni (R4) (Mayotte)
17.	(Mayotte) M'Tsanga 2000 (R4)	1–3	FC Bouyouni (R4) (Mayotte)
18.	(Mayotte) ASCE Mirereni (R4)	1–2	AS Tour Eiffel (R4) (Mayotte)
19.	(Mayotte) VSS Hagnoudrou (R4)	4–2	US M'Tsamoudou (R4) (Mayotte)

Note: Mayotte League Structure (no promotion to French League Structure):
Régionale 1 (R1)
Régionale 2 (R2)
Régionale 3 (R3)
Régionale 4 (R4)

=== Second round (Mayotte) ===
These matches were played on 17 and 18 June 2023. Four teams were given byes to the third round (AS Neige, RC Barakani, CS M'ramadoudou and AS Ongojou)

Second round results: Mayotte
Tie no	Home team (Tier)	Score	Away team (Tier)
1.	(Mayotte) ASJ Moinatrindri (R3)	2–2 (4–5 p)	FC Kani-Bé (R3) (Mayotte)
2.	(Mayotte) Feu du Centre (R4)	1–0	US Bandréle (R3) (Mayotte)
3.	(Mayotte) ASSO Club Mirereni (R4)	1–1 (8–9 p)	AS Sada (R2) (Mayotte)
4.	(Mayotte) Voulvavi Sport & Culture (R4)	0–3	USC Kangani (R4) (Mayotte)
5.	(Mayotte) FC Shingabwé (R4)	1–2	FC Labattoir (R2) (Mayotte)
6.	(Mayotte) VCO Vahibé (R3)	1–0	Trévani SC (R4) (Mayotte)
7.	(Mayotte) Miracle du Sud (R3)	– (Note: Result unknown)	M'Tsamboro FC (R4) (Mayotte)
8.	(Mayotte) FC Majicavo (R2)	3–1	Racine du Nord (R3) (Mayotte)
9.	(Mayotte) FC Dembeni (R2)	2–1	USCJ Koungou (R3) (Mayotte)
10.	(Mayotte) Entente Mahabou/TCO (R3)	0–3	Espoir Club de Longoni (R3) (Mayotte)
11.	(Mayotte) ASJ Handréma (R2)	1–1 (2–4 p)	AOE Chiconi (R3) (Mayotte)
12.	(Mayotte) USC Labattoir (R4)	1–0	Tornade Club de Majicavo-Lamir (R4) (Mayotte)
13.	(Mayotte) Lance Missile (R4)	3–1	FC Ylang de Koungou (R3) (Mayotte)
14.	(Mayotte) Tchanga SC (R2)	2–1	ACSJ Alakarabu (R3) (Mayotte)
15.	(Mayotte) AS Tour Eiffel (R4)	1–2	FC Chiconi (R2) (Mayotte)
16.	(Mayotte) AS Papillon d'Honneur (R4)	0–6	Choungui FC (R2) (Mayotte)
17.	Enfants de Mayotte (R3)	2–2 (4–3 p)	Pamandzi SC (R4) (Mayotte)
18.	(Mayotte) UCS Sada (R2)	3–2	N'Drema Club (R3) (Mayotte)
19.	(Mayotte) AS Defense de Kawéni (R3)	0–0 (4–2 p)	FC Bouyouni (R4) (Mayotte)
20.	(Mayotte) RCES Poroani (R4)	1–1 (6–7 p)	FC Sohoa (R3) (Mayotte)
21.	(Mayotte) VSS Hagnoudrou (R4)	2–1	FMJ Vahibé (R2) (Mayotte)
22.	(Mayotte) Espérance d'Iloni (R3)	4–2	AS Bandraboua (R2) (Mayotte)
23.	(Mayotte) Etincelles Hamjago (R3)	3–2	US Ouangani (R4) (Mayotte)
24.	(Mayotte) AS Kahani (R3)	2–1	Olympique Mirereni (R3) (Mayotte)
25.	(Mayotte) Espoir Mtsapéré (R4)	0–0 (3–5 p)	ACSJ M'Liha (R3) (Mayotte)

Note: Mayotte League Structure (no promotion to French League Structure):
Régionale 1 (R1)
Régionale 2 (R2)
Régionale 3 (R3)
Régionale 4 (R4)

=== Third round (Mayotte) ===
These matches were played on 14 and 15 July, and 2 August 2023. 23 teams were given byes to the next round.

Third round results: Mayotte
Tie no	Home team (Tier)	Score	Away team (Tier)
1.	(Mayotte) AS Neige (R2)	0–1	ACSJ M'Liha (R3) (Mayotte)
2.	(Mayotte) UCS Sada (R2)	1–1 (5–6 p)	FC Sohoa (R3) (Mayotte)
3.	(Mayotte) CS M'ramadoudou (R3)	1–3	FC Mtsapéré (R1) (Mayotte)
4.	(Mayotte) Espérance d'Iloni (R3)	3–2	FC Dembeni (R2) (Mayotte)
5.	(Mayotte) VCO Vahibé (R3)	0–0 (3–4 p)	AOE Chiconi (R3) (Mayotte)
6.	(Mayotte) Espoir Club de Longoni (R3)	0–2	AJ Mtsahara (R1) (Mayotte)
7.	(Mayotte) USC Anteou Poroani (R1)	0–4	US Kavani (R2) (Mayotte)
8.	(Mayotte) Miracle du Sud (R3)	4–2	Feu du Centre (R4) (Mayotte)
9.	(Mayotte) VSS Hagnoudrou (R4)	0–3	AS Jumeaux de M'zouazia (R1) (Mayotte)

Note: Mayotte League Structure (no promotion to French League Structure):
Régionale 1 (R1)
Régionale 2 (R2)
Régionale 3 (R3)
Régionale 4 (R4)

=== Round of 32 (Mayotte) ===
These matches were played between 5 and 15 August 2023.

Round of 32 results: Mayotte
Tie no	Home team (Tier)	Score	Away team (Tier)
1.	(Mayotte) US Kavani (R2)	0–2	FC Mtsapéré (R1) (Mayotte)
2.	(Mayotte) AS Defense de Kawéni (R3)	2–2 (4–3 p)	AS Kahani (R3) (Mayotte)
3.	(Mayotte) ACSJ M'Liha (R3)	2–2 (4–2 p)	FC Chiconi (R2) (Mayotte)
4.	(Mayotte) FC Sohoa (R3)	1–1 (3–2 p)	ASC Kaweni (R1) (Mayotte)
5.	(Mayotte) Espérance d'Iloni (R3)	1–2	AS Rosador (R1) (Mayotte)
6.	Enfants de Mayotte (R3)	6–5	AJ Mtsahara (R1) (Mayotte)
7.	(Mayotte) AJ Kani-Kéli (R1)	1–1 (7–8 p)	Choungui FC (R2) (Mayotte)
8.	(Mayotte) Tchanga SC (R2)	1–2	FC Labattoir (R2) (Mayotte)
9.	(Mayotte) AS Sada (R2)	2–2 (4–5 p)	Diables Noirs (R1) (Mayotte)
10.	(Mayotte) Foudre 2000 de Dzoumogné (R1)	0–0 (2–4 p)	Bandrélé FC (R1) (Mayotte)
11.	(Mayotte) ASC Abeilles (R1)	2–1	FC Majicavo (R2) (Mayotte)
12.	(Mayotte) FC Kani-Bé (R3)	2–3	AS Jumeaux de M'zouazia (R1) (Mayotte)
13.	(Mayotte) USC Kangani (R4)	4–3	RC Barakani (R4) (Mayotte)
14.	(Mayotte) Lance Missile (R4)	– (Note: Score not known, other than Miracle du Sud won in a penalty shootout.)	Miracle du Sud (R3) (Mayotte)
15.	(Mayotte) USC Labattoir (R4)	– (Note: Score not known.)	AOE Chiconi (R3) (Mayotte)
16.	(Mayotte) Etincelles Hamjago (R3)	5–1	AS Ongojou (R4) (Mayotte)

Note: Mayotte League Structure (no promotion to French League Structure):
Régionale 1 (R1)
Régionale 2 (R2)
Régionale 3 (R3)
Régionale 4 (R4)

=== Round of 16 (Mayotte) ===
These matches were played on 9 September 2023.

Round of 16 results: Mayotte
Tie no	Home team (Tier)	Score	Away team (Tier)
1.	(Mayotte) Etincelles Hamjago (R3)	1–1 (4–2 p)	Diables Noirs (R1) (Mayotte)
2.	(Mayotte) AS Defense de Kawéni (R3)	0–1	FC Sohoa (R3) (Mayotte)
3.	(Mayotte) USC Kangani (R4)	– (Note: Score not known.)	Enfants de Mayotte (R3)
4.	(Mayotte) FC Labattoir (R2)	1–1 (5–6 p)	AS Jumeaux de M'zouazia (R1) (Mayotte)
5.	(Mayotte) Choungui FC (R2)	0–2	AS Rosador (R1) (Mayotte)
6.	(Mayotte) AOE Chiconi (R3)	1–1 (1–3 p)	ASC Abeilles (R1) (Mayotte)
7.	(Mayotte) Miracle du Sud (R3)	–	Bandrélé FC (R1) (Mayotte)
8.	(Mayotte) ACSJ M'Liha (R3)	1–0	FC Mtsapéré (R1) (Mayotte)

Note: Mayotte League Structure (no promotion to French League Structure):
Régionale 1 (R1)
Régionale 2 (R2)
Régionale 3 (R3)
Régionale 4 (R4)

=== Quarter final (Mayotte) ===
These matches were played on 23 September 2023.

Quarter final results: Mayotte
Tie no	Home team (Tier)	Score	Away team (Tier)
1.	(Mayotte) FC Sohoa (R3)	0–2	Bandrélé FC (R1) (Mayotte)
2.	(Mayotte) Etincelles Hamjago (R3)	0–1	ASC Abeilles (R1) (Mayotte)
3.	(Mayotte) AS Rosador (R1)	0–0 (3–2 p)	AS Jumeaux de M'zouazia (R1) (Mayotte)
4.	Enfants de Mayotte (R3)	0–1	ACSJ M'Liha (R3) (Mayotte)

Note: Mayotte League Structure (no promotion to French League Structure):
Régionale 1 (R1)
Régionale 2 (R2)
Régionale 3 (R3)
Régionale 4 (R4)

=== Semi final (Mayotte) ===
These matches were played on 30 September 2023.

Semi final results: Mayotte
Tie no	Home team (Tier)	Score	Away team (Tier)
1.	(Mayotte) ASC Abeilles (R1)	0–2	AS Rosador (R1) (Mayotte)
2.	(Mayotte) ACSJ M'Liha (R3)	2–0	Bandrélé FC (R1) (Mayotte)

Note: Mayotte League Structure (no promotion to French League Structure):
Régionale 1 (R1)
Régionale 2 (R2)
Régionale 3 (R3)
Régionale 4 (R4)

=== Final (Mayotte) ===
This match was played on 14 October 2023.

Final results: Mayotte
Tie no	Home team (Tier)	Score	Away team (Tier)
1.	(Mayotte) ACSJ M'Liha (R3)	0–3	AS Rosador (R1) (Mayotte)

Note: Mayotte League Structure (no promotion to French League Structure):
Régionale 1 (R1)
Régionale 2 (R2)
Régionale 3 (R3)
Régionale 4 (R4)

== Réunion ==
For this season, the Réunion league designated that entrants would be the teams from Régionale 1 and two teams chosen from Super 2, totalling 16 teams. The first draw for teams in the Réunion league, titled as the second round in line with the mainland competition, was published on 11 May 2023. The league titled the next round as the fifth round, publishing the draw on 30 June 2023. The league confirmed the programme for the sixth round on 24 October 2023.

=== Second round (Réunion) ===
These matches were played on 17 and 18 May 2023.

Second round results: Réunion
Tie no	Home team (Tier)	Score	Away team (Tier)
1.	(Réunion) JS Saint-Pierroise (R1)	6–0	AS Bretagne (S2) (Réunion)
2.	(Réunion) Saint-Denis FC (R1)	6–0	AS Capricorne (R1) (Réunion)
3.	(Réunion) OC Saint-André les Léopards (R1)	1–2	Trois Bassins FC (R1) (Réunion)
4.	(Réunion) SS Jeanne d'Arc (R1)	1–1 (7–6 p)	AS Sainte-Suzanne (R1) (Réunion)
5.	(Réunion) Saint-Pauloise FC (R1)	0–0 (2–4 p)	AF Saint-Louisien (R1) (Réunion)
6.	(Réunion) ACF Piton Saint-Leu (R1)	1–1 (4–2 p)	AS Saint-Louisienne (S2) (Réunion)
7.	(Réunion) La Tamponnaise (R1)	4–0	US Sainte-Marienne (R1) (Réunion)
8.	(Réunion) AS Excelsior (R1)	2–0	SC Chaudron (R1) (Réunion)

Note: Reúnion League Structure (no promotion to French League Structure):
Régional 1 (R1)
Super 2 (S2)

=== Fifth round (Réunion) ===
These matches were played on 15 and 16 July 2023.

Fifth round results: Réunion
Tie no	Home team (Tier)	Score	Away team (Tier)
1.	(Réunion) Saint-Denis FC (R1)	1-0	SS Jeanne d'Arc (R1) (Réunion)
2.	(Réunion) JS Saint-Pierroise (R1)	4-1	Trois Bassins FC (R1) (Réunion)
3.	(Réunion) La Tamponnaise (R1)	1-0	AF Saint-Louisien (R1) (Réunion)
4.	(Réunion) AS Excelsior (R1)	2-0	ACF Piton Saint-Leu (R1) (Réunion)

Note: Reúnion League Structure (no promotion to French League Structure):
Régional 1 (R1)
Super 2 (S2)

=== Sixth round (Réunion) ===
These matches were played on 29 October 2023.

Sixth round results: Réunion
Tie no	Home team (Tier)	Score	Away team (Tier)
1.	(Réunion) JS Saint-Pierroise (R1)	1–1 (5–6 p)	Saint-Denis FC (R1) (Réunion)
2.	(Réunion) AS Excelsior (R1)	1–1 (4–5 p)	La Tamponnaise (R1) (Réunion)

Note: Reúnion League Structure (no promotion to French League Structure):
Régional 1 (R1)
Super 2 (S2)

== French Guiana ==
On 9 July 2023, the league published the list of the 38 teams registered for the qualifying competition. The draw for the first two rounds, starting with the second round to align with the naming convention of the main competition, was originally carried out on 7 July 2023, but due to an error it was redrawn on 12 July 2023. The draw for the remaining rounds of the competition was published on 28 August 2023.

=== Second round (French Guiana) ===
These matches were played on 12 and 13 August 2023.

Second Round Results: French Guiana
Tie no	Home team (Tier)	Score	Away team (Tier)
1.	(French Guiana) ASCS Maripasoula (R2)	3–0 (Note: Tie won by means of forfeit.)	PAC Maroni (R2) (French Guiana)
2.	(French Guiana) ASC Kawina (R2)	0–3	EJ Balaté (R2) (French Guiana)
3.	(French Guiana) Aigles d'Or Mana (R2)	2–3	AJ Saint-Georges (R1) (French Guiana)
4.	(French Guiana) AJS Kourou (R2)	3–0	EF Iracoubo (R2) (French Guiana)
5.	(French Guiana) US de Matoury (R1)	1–1 (4–1 p)	USC Montsinéry-Tonnegrande (R1) (French Guiana)
6.	(French Guiana) Dynamo De Soula (R2)	1–1 (1–4 p)	ASC Armire (R2) (French Guiana)

Note: French Guiana League Structure (no promotion to French League Structure):
Régional 1 (R1)
Régional 2 (R2)

=== Third round (French Guiana) ===
These matches were played on 26 and 27 August, with one postponed until 9 September 2023.

Third Round Results: French Guiana
Tie no	Home team (Tier)	Score	Away team (Tier)
1.	(French Guiana) ASE Matoury (R1)	5–0	Yana Sport Elite Academy (R3) (French Guiana)
2.	(French Guiana) AJ Saint-Georges (R1)	3–0 (Note: Tie reversed from original draw.)	ASCS Maripasoula (R2) (French Guiana)
3.	(French Guiana) ASCS Cogneau Lamirande (R3)	2–4	FC Charvein Mana (R2) (French Guiana)
4.	(French Guiana) US Macouria (R2)	1–7	SC Kouroucien (R1) (French Guiana)
5.	(French Guiana) AJS Kourou (R2)	1–1 (6–5 p)	ASL Sport Guyanais (R1) (French Guiana)
6.	(French Guiana) ASC Le Geldar (R1)	8–0	Academy FC (R2) (French Guiana)
7.	(French Guiana) AJ Balata Abriba (R1)	0–3	Olympique Cayenne (R1) (French Guiana)
8.	(French Guiana) US de Matoury (R1)	3–0 (Note: Tie won by means of forfeit.)	RC Maroni (R2) (French Guiana)
9.	(French Guiana) EJ Balaté (R2)	3–1	CSC de Cayenne (R1) (French Guiana)
10.	(French Guiana) USL Montjoly (R2)	1–1 (2–4 p)	USC De Roura (R2) (French Guiana)
11.	(French Guiana) ASC Agouado (R2)	3–1	ASC Karib (R1) (French Guiana)
12.	(French Guiana) Loyola OC (R1)	2–2 (6–5 p)	ASC Ouest (R2) (French Guiana)
13.	(French Guiana) AS La Joyeusu Montjoly (R3)	0–8	ASU Grand Santi (R1) (French Guiana)
14.	(French Guiana) US Saint-Élie (R3)	0–3	US Sinnamary (R2) (French Guiana)
15.	(French Guiana) ASC Armire (R2)	0–0 (2–0 p)	ASC Rémire (R1) (French Guiana)
16.	(French Guiana) Kourou FC (R3)	1–4	Cosma Foot (R2) (French Guiana)

Note: French Guiana League Structure (no promotion to French League Structure):
Régional 1 (R1)
Régional 2 (R2)
Régional 3 (R3)

=== Fourth round (French Guiana) ===
These matches were played on 23 September 2023.

Fourth Round Results: French Guiana
Tie no	Home team (Tier)	Score	Away team (Tier)
1.	(French Guiana) ASE Matoury (R1)	1–1 (3–2 p)	AJ Saint-Georges (R1) (French Guiana)
2.	(French Guiana) FC Charvein Mana (R2)	2–2 (4–5 p)	SC Kouroucien (R1) (French Guiana)
3.	(French Guiana) AJS Kourou (R2)	1–2	ASC Le Geldar (R1) (French Guiana)
4.	(French Guiana) Olympique Cayenne (R1)	3–2	US de Matoury (R1) (French Guiana)
5.	(French Guiana) USC De Roura (R2)	0–2	EJ Balaté (R2) (French Guiana)
6.	(French Guiana) ASC Agouado (R2)	3–1	Loyola OC (R1) (French Guiana)
7.	(French Guiana) ASU Grand Santi (R1)	1–1 (4–5 p)	US Sinnamary (R2) (French Guiana)
8.	(French Guiana) Cosma Foot (R2)	3–1	ASC Armire (R2) (French Guiana)

Note: French Guiana League Structure (no promotion to French League Structure):
Régional 1 (R1)
Régional 2 (R2)
Régional 3 (R3)

=== Fifth round (French Guiana) ===
These matches were played on 7 and 8 October 2023.

Fifth Round Results: French Guiana
Tie no	Home team (Tier)	Score	Away team (Tier)
1.	(French Guiana) SC Kouroucien (R1)	1–1 (5–6 p)	ASE Matoury (R1) (French Guiana)
2.	(French Guiana) ASC Le Geldar (R1)	3–2	Olympique Cayenne (R1) (French Guiana)
3.	(French Guiana) EJ Balaté (R2)	1–3	ASC Agouado (R2) (French Guiana)
4.	(French Guiana) US Sinnamary (R2)	3–2	Cosma Foot (R2) (French Guiana)

Note: French Guiana League Structure (no promotion to French League Structure):
Régional 1 (R1)
Régional 2 (R2)
Régional 3 (R3)

=== Sixth round (French Guiana) ===
These matches were played on 28 and 29 October 2023.

Sixth Round Results: French Guiana
Tie no	Home team (Tier)	Score	Away team (Tier)
1.	(French Guiana) ASE Matoury (R1)	1–1 (1–3 p)	ASC Le Geldar (R1) (French Guiana)
2.	(French Guiana) ASC Agouado (R2)	1–0	US Sinnamary (R2) (French Guiana)

Note: French Guiana League Structure (no promotion to French League Structure):
Régional 1 (R1)
Régional 2 (R2)
Régional 3 (R3)

== Martinique ==
On 16 August 2023, the league published the draw for the opening round of the competition, name the 2ème tour, or second round, to align with the rest of the main competition. The 26 ties drawn in this round, and the 6 byes required to form 16 ties in the next round, made for a total of 58 teams taking part in the qualifying competition. The third round draw was published by local media the day after the second round matches took place. The fourth round draw was published by local media on 5 September 2023. The fifth round draw was made on 26 September 2023.

=== Second round (Martinique) ===
These matches were played on 26 and 27 August 2023.

Second Round Results: Martinique
Tie no	Home team (Tier)	Score	Away team (Tier)
1.	(Martinique) Stade Spiritain (R1)	7–0	La Gauloise de Trinité (R2) (Martinique)
2.	(Martinique) L'Intrépide Club (R3)	0–3 (Note: Tie won by means of forfeit.)	CS Case-Pilote (R1) (Martinique)
3.	(Martinique) US Diamantinoise (R1)	5–1	Réveil Sportif (R2) (Martinique)
4.	(Martinique) UJ Redoute (R3)	0–3	Aiglon du Lamentin FC (R1) (Martinique)
5.	(Martinique) SC Lamentin (R2)	1–4	Inter de Sainte-Anne (R2) (Martinique)
6.	(Martinique) ASC Môn Pito (R2)	3–0	ASC Hirondelle (R3) (Martinique)
7.	(Martinique) RC Lorrain (R3)	1–4	Réal Tartane (R2) (Martinique)
8.	(Martinique) FEP Monésie (R3)	3–0	Étincelle Macouba (R3) (Martinique)
9.	(Martinique) RC Bô Kannal (R3)	0–3	AS Étoile Basse-Pointe (R2) (Martinique)
10.	(Martinique) Éveil Les Trois Islets (R2)	3–0	Gri-Gri Pilotin FC (R3) (Martinique)
11.	Futsal Académie Martinique (R3)	0–2	Essor-Préchotain (R2) (Martinique)
12.	(Martinique) RC Rivière-Pilote (R2)	6–1	AS Silver Star (R3) (Martinique)
13.	(Martinique) Espoir Sainte-Luce (R2)	4–2 (Note: Espoir Sainte-Luce penalised, CO Trénelle qualify.)	CO Trénelle (R2) (Martinique)
14.	(Martinique) AS New Club (R1)	4–0	Étendard Bellefontaine (R2) (Martinique)
15.	(Martinique) Solidarité de Lestrade (R3)	0–13	CS Vauclinois (R1) (Martinique)
16.	(Martinique) Golden Star de Fort-de-France (R1)	2–0	Olympique Le Marin (R2) (Martinique)
17.	(Martinique) JS Marigot (R3)	0–11	Club Péléen (R1) (Martinique)
18.	(Martinique) RC Saint-Joseph (R1)	4–0	AS Éclair Rivière-Salée (R2) (Martinique)
19.	(Martinique) AS Morne-des-Esses (R2)	4–0	AS Excelsior (R2) (Martinique)
20.	(Martinique) Anses Arlets FC (R3)	0–3	ASPTT Martinique (R3)
21.	(Martinique) New Star Ducos (R3)	2–4	JS Eucalyptus (R2) (Martinique)
22.	(Martinique) Océanic Club Le Lorrain (R3)	1–3	AC Vert-Pré (R1) (Martinique)
23.	(Martinique) US Robert (R2)	2–2 (5–4 p)	ASC Effort (R3) (Martinique)
24.	(Martinique) Assaut de Saint-Pierre (R1)	5–0	Good Luck de Fort-de-France (R2) (Martinique)
25.	(Martinique) ASC Emulation (R2)	5–0	CS Bélimois (R3) (Martinique)
26.	(Martinique) ASC Eudorçait-Fourniols (R3)	3–0	UJ Monnérot (R2) (Martinique)

Note: Martinique League Structure (no promotion to French League Structure):
Régionale 1 (R1)
Régionale 2 (R2)
Régionale 3 (R3)

=== Third round (Martinique) ===
These matches were played on 1, 2 and 3 September 2023.

Third Round Results: Martinique
Tie no	Home team (Tier)	Score	Away team (Tier)
1.	(Martinique) CO Trénelle (R2)	2–1	US Diamantinoise (R1) (Martinique)
2.	(Martinique) Essor-Préchotain (R2)	1–1 (5–4 p)	ASC Môn Pito (R2) (Martinique)
3.	(Martinique) Réal Tartane (R2)	1–2	Inter de Sainte-Anne (R2) (Martinique)
4.	(Martinique) Aiglon du Lamentin FC (R1)	2–1	US Riveraine (R1) (Martinique)
5.	(Martinique) AS Samaritaine (R1)	1–1 (5–4 p)	Club Franciscain (R1) (Martinique)
6.	(Martinique) CS Case-Pilote (R1)	2–1	Éveil Les Trois Islets (R2) (Martinique)
7.	(Martinique) AS Étoile Basse-Pointe (R2)	1–3	Stade Spiritain (R1) (Martinique)
8.	(Martinique) FEP Monésie (R3)	0–8	RC Rivière-Pilote (R2) (Martinique)
9.	(Martinique) JS Eucalyptus (R2)	0–4	RC Saint-Joseph (R1) (Martinique)
10.	(Martinique) CS Vauclinois (R1)	3–1	AS Morne-des-Esses (R2) (Martinique)
11.	(Martinique) ASC Eudorçait-Fourniols (R3)	2–4	Golden Star de Fort-de-France (R1) (Martinique)
12.	(Martinique) Club Péléen (R1)	5–4	Club Colonial (R1) (Martinique)
13.	(Martinique) AC Vert-Pré (R1)	3–2	ASPTT Martinique (R3)
14.	(Martinique) Golden Lion FC (R1)	3–0	Assaut de Saint-Pierre (R1) (Martinique)
15.	(Martinique) ASC Emulation (R2)	2–0	US Marinoise (R2) (Martinique)
16.	(Martinique) AS New Club (R1)	1–2	US Robert (R2) (Martinique)

Note: Martinique League Structure (no promotion to French League Structure):
Régionale 1 (R1)
Régionale 2 (R2)
Régionale 3 (R3)

=== Fourth round (Martinique) ===
These matches were played on 8, 9, 19, 22 and 23 September 2023.

Fourth Round Results: Martinique
Tie no	Home team (Tier)	Score	Away team (Tier)
1.	(Martinique) Inter de Sainte-Anne (R2)	1–5	Aiglon du Lamentin FC (R1) (Martinique)
2.	(Martinique) RC Rivière-Pilote (R2)	1–1 (3–4 p)	AS Samaritaine (R1) (Martinique)
3.	(Martinique) Essor-Préchotain (R2)	4–1	CO Trénelle (R2) (Martinique)
4.	(Martinique) Stade Spiritain (R1)	6–3	CS Case-Pilote (R1) (Martinique)
5.	(Martinique) RC Saint-Joseph (R1)	3–2 (Note: RC Saint-Joseph penalised for fielding too many transferred players, Club Péléen qualify.)	Club Péléen (R1) (Martinique)
6.	(Martinique) US Robert (R2)	3–1	AC Vert-Pré (R1) (Martinique)
7.	(Martinique) Golden Star de Fort-de-France (R1)	2–4	Golden Lion FC (R1) (Martinique)
8.	(Martinique) CS Vauclinois (R1)	2–2 (4–1 p)	ASC Emulation (R2) (Martinique)

Note: Martinique League Structure (no promotion to French League Structure):
Régionale 1 (R1)
Régionale 2 (R2)
Régionale 3 (R3)

=== Fifth round (Martinique) ===
These matches were played on 3, 4 and 14 October 2023.

Fifth Round Results: Martinique
Tie no	Home team (Tier)	Score	Away team (Tier)
1.	(Martinique) AS Samaritaine (R1)	2–1	Essor-Préchotain (R2) (Martinique)
2.	(Martinique) Aiglon du Lamentin FC (R1)	2–5	Stade Spiritain (R1) (Martinique)
3.	(Martinique) Golden Lion FC (R1)	4–0	CS Vauclinois (R1) (Martinique)
4.	(Martinique) Club Péléen (R1)	3–1	US Robert (R2) (Martinique)

Note: Martinique League Structure (no promotion to French League Structure):
Régionale 1 (R1)
Régionale 2 (R2)
Régionale 3 (R3)

=== Sixth round (Martinique) ===
These matches were played on 28 October 2023.

Sixth Round Results: Martinique
Tie no	Home team (Tier)	Score	Away team (Tier)
1.	(Martinique) Stade Spiritain (R1)	0–5	AS Samaritaine (R1) (Martinique)
2.	(Martinique) Golden Lion FC (R1)	4–1	Club Péléen (R1) (Martinique)

Note: Martinique League Structure (no promotion to French League Structure):
Régionale 1 (R1)
Régionale 2 (R2)
Régionale 3 (R3)

== Guadeloupe ==
The draw for the opening round of the competition, named as the second round to align with the main competition, was made on 20 July 2023, and published a day later on the official Facebook page of the league. A total of 20 ties were drawn, meaning 12 teams were handed byes in order for the third round to have the required number of teams, and a total of 52 teams had entered the competition from the region. The third round draw was only published on the Facebook page of the league on 1 September 2023, the day before the round began. The fourth round draw was published on 22 September 2023 on the leagues website, the day before the round began. The fifth round draw was also only published on the Facebook page of the league on 17 October 2023, the day the first of the games was played.

=== Second round (Guadeloupe) ===
These matches were played on various dates between 19 and 26 August 2023.

Second Round Results: Guadeloupe
Tie no	Home team (Tier)	Score	Away team (Tier)
1.	(Guadeloupe) Alliance FC (R3)	0–6	Résistance Bouillante (R2) (Guadeloupe)
2.	(Guadeloupe) FC Saint-François (R3)	0–3	ASC Madiana (R3) (Guadeloupe)
3.	(Guadeloupe) US Cambrefort (R1)	1–3	ASC Équinoxe (R2) (Guadeloupe)
4.	(Guadeloupe) AS Le Moule (R2)	0–0 (5–4 p)	AS Juventa (R3) (Guadeloupe)
5.	(Guadeloupe) ASC La Frégate (R2)	1–1 (3–4 p)	Union des Artistes de Raizet (R2) (Guadeloupe)
6.	(Guadeloupe) CS Saint-François (R2)	4–4 (3–5 p)	CS Bouillantais (R2) (Guadeloupe)
7.	(Guadeloupe) L'Éclair de Petit-Bourg (R3)	4–1	AJ Saint-Félix (R3) (Guadeloupe)
8.	(Guadeloupe) Colonial Club Baillif (R2)	3–1 (Note: Tie reversed from original draw.)	Granite FC (R3) (Guadeloupe)
9.	(Guadeloupe) Unité Sainte-Rosienne (R2)	0–2	Arsenal Club (R2) (Guadeloupe)
10.	(Guadeloupe) CA Marquisat (R2)	2–2 (4–5 p)	Étoile Filante (R3) (Guadeloupe)
11.	(Guadeloupe) Mondial Club (R3)	3–0 (Note: Tie won by means of forfeit.)	Rapid Club Petit-Canal (R3) (Guadeloupe)
12.	(Guadeloupe) Cygne Noir (R2)	0–2	AO Gourbeyrienne (R2) (Guadeloupe)
13.	(Guadeloupe) USC de Bananier (R3)	0–3	JSC Marie Galante (R2) (Guadeloupe)
14.	(Guadeloupe) Stade Lamentinois (R2)	2–4	Racing Club de Basse-Terre (R2) (Guadeloupe)
15.	(Guadeloupe) US Ansoise (R2)	1–1 (4–3 p) (Note: US Ansoise penalised, Zénith Morne-à-l'Eau qualify.)	Zénith Morne-à-l'Eau (R2) (Guadeloupe)
16.	(Guadeloupe) Red Star (R2)	1–1 (3–2 p)	AS Nenuphars (R3) (Guadeloupe)
17.	(Guadeloupe) Jeuness Trois-Rivières (R3)	6–1	US Grand-Bourg (R3) (Guadeloupe)
18.	(Guadeloupe) AS Dragon (R2)	1–1 (3–4 p)	JS Abymienne (R2) (Guadeloupe)
19.	(Guadeloupe) JS Vieux-Habitants (R2)	1–0	CS Capesterre-Belle-Eau (R2) (Guadeloupe)
20.	(Guadeloupe) Association Juvenis (R3)	0–3	US Baie-Mahault (R1) (Guadeloupe)

Note: Guadeloupe League Structure (no promotion to French League Structure):
Ligue Régionale 1 (R1)
Ligue Régionale 2 (R2)
Ligue Régionale 3 (R3)

=== Third round (Guadeloupe) ===
These matches were played on 1, 2 and 3 September 2023.

Third Round Results: Guadeloupe
Tie no	Home team (Tier)	Score	Away team (Tier)
1.	(Guadeloupe) ASC Équinoxe (R2)	3–4	AS Le Moule (R2) (Guadeloupe)
2.	(Guadeloupe) Étoile Filante (R3)	0–1	L'Etoile de Morne-à-l'Eau (R1) (Guadeloupe)
3.	(Guadeloupe) Phare du Canal (R1)	1–2	ASC Siroco Les Abymes (R1) (Guadeloupe)
4.	(Guadeloupe) L'Éclair de Petit-Bourg (R3)	1–6	SC Baie-Mahault (R1) (Guadeloupe)
5.	(Guadeloupe) Dynamo Le Moule (R1)	2–0	Colonial Club Baillif (R2) (Guadeloupe)
6.	(Guadeloupe) Résistance Bouillante (R2)	0–5	Solidarité-Scolaire (R1) (Guadeloupe)
7.	(Guadeloupe) Union des Artistes de Raizet (R2)	4–0	ASC Madiana (R3) (Guadeloupe)
8.	(Guadeloupe) Arsenal Club (R2)	1–1 (7–6 p)	CS Bouillantais (R2) (Guadeloupe)
9.	(Guadeloupe) AS Gosier (R1)	3–1	Jeunesse Evolution (R1) (Guadeloupe)
10.	(Guadeloupe) CS Moulien (R1)	6–1	ASG Juventus de Sainte-Anne (R1) (Guadeloupe)
11.	(Guadeloupe) JSC Marie Galante (R2)	1–1 (2–4 p)	Amical Club Marie Galante (R1) (Guadeloupe)
12.	(Guadeloupe) Racing Club de Basse-Terre (R2)	6–2	Jeuness Trois-Rivières (R3) (Guadeloupe)
13.	(Guadeloupe) Zénith Morne-à-l'Eau (R2)	0–3	Mondial Club (R3) (Guadeloupe)
14.	(Guadeloupe) US Baie-Mahault (R1)	0–3	Red Star (R2) (Guadeloupe)
15.	(Guadeloupe) JS Abymienne (R2)	0–8	La Gauloise de Basse-Terre (R1) (Guadeloupe)
16.	(Guadeloupe) AO Gourbeyrienne (R2)	0–2	JS Vieux-Habitants (R2) (Guadeloupe)

Note: Guadeloupe League Structure (no promotion to French League Structure):
Ligue Régionale 1 (R1)
Ligue Régionale 2 (R2)
Ligue Régionale 3 (R3)

=== Fourth round (Guadeloupe) ===
These matches were played on 22, 23, 24 and 27 September 2023.

Fourth Round Results: Guadeloupe
Tie no	Home team (Tier)	Score	Away team (Tier)
1.	(Guadeloupe) L'Etoile de Morne-à-l'Eau (R1)	3–2	Arsenal Club (R2) (Guadeloupe)
2.	(Guadeloupe) AS Le Moule (R2)	2–1	Dynamo Le Moule (R1) (Guadeloupe)
3.	(Guadeloupe) SC Baie-Mahault (R1)	1–0	ASC Siroco Les Abymes (R1) (Guadeloupe)
4.	(Guadeloupe) Solidarité-Scolaire (R1)	2–4	Union des Artistes de Raizet (R2) (Guadeloupe)
5.	(Guadeloupe) JS Vieux-Habitants (R2)	1–4	Racing Club de Basse-Terre (R2) (Guadeloupe)
6.	(Guadeloupe) Mondial Club (R3)	0–8	CS Moulien (R1) (Guadeloupe)
7.	(Guadeloupe) Amical Club Marie Galante (R1)	0–2	La Gauloise de Basse-Terre (R1) (Guadeloupe)
8.	(Guadeloupe) Red Star (R2)	1–4	AS Gosier (R1) (Guadeloupe)

Note: Guadeloupe League Structure (no promotion to French League Structure):
Ligue Régionale 1 (R1)
Ligue Régionale 2 (R2)
Ligue Régionale 3 (R3)

=== Fifth round (Guadeloupe) ===
These matches were played on 17 and 18 October 2023.

Fifth Round Results: Guadeloupe
Tie no	Home team (Tier)	Score	Away team (Tier)
1.	(Guadeloupe) SC Baie-Mahault (R1)	2–0	L'Etoile de Morne-à-l'Eau (R1) (Guadeloupe)
2.	(Guadeloupe) Union des Artistes de Raizet (R2)	0–1	AS Le Moule (R2) (Guadeloupe)
3.	(Guadeloupe) AS Gosier (R1)	0–0 (3–5 p)	CS Moulien (R1) (Guadeloupe)
4.	(Guadeloupe) Racing Club de Basse-Terre (R2)	1–4	La Gauloise de Basse-Terre (R1) (Guadeloupe)

Note: Guadeloupe League Structure (no promotion to French League Structure):
Ligue Régionale 1 (R1)
Ligue Régionale 2 (R2)
Ligue Régionale 3 (R3)

=== Sixth round (Guadeloupe) ===
These matches were played on 27 and 28 October 2023.

Sixth Round Results: Guadeloupe
Tie no	Home team (Tier)	Score	Away team (Tier)
1.	(Guadeloupe) AS Le Moule (R2)	0–4	SC Baie-Mahault (R1) (Guadeloupe)
2.	(Guadeloupe) CS Moulien (R1)	5–0	La Gauloise de Basse-Terre (R1) (Guadeloupe)

Note: Guadeloupe League Structure (no promotion to French League Structure):
Ligue Régionale 1 (R1)
Ligue Régionale 2 (R2)
Ligue Régionale 3 (R3)

== See also ==
- Overseas France teams in the main competition of the Coupe de France
