= Rhudy Evens =

French Guianan footballer (born 1988)

Personal information
- Full name: Rhudy Yannis Evens
- Date of birth: 13 February 1988 (age 38)
- Place of birth: Kourou, French Guiana
- Position: Midfielder

Team information
- Current team: US de Matoury

Senior career*
Years	Team	Apps	(Gls)
2006–2023	ASC Le Geldar		
2012–2013	→ AJ Saint-Georges (loan)		(0)
2013	→ AS Le Gosier (loan)		(0)
2014–2016	→ US Macouria (loan)		(1)
2023–	US de Matoury		(0)

International career
2008–2022	French Guiana	63	(8)
- * Club domestic league appearances and goals

Rhudy Yannis Evens (born 13 February 1988) is a French Guianan footballer who currently plays as a midfielder for French Guiana Régional 1 club US de Matoury.

== Club career ==
He played for ASC Le Geldar between 2006 and 2023, and he was loaned out to AJ Saint-Georges and AS Le Gosier (Guadeloupe) during the 2012–13 season, and was loaned to US Macouria between 2014 and 2016; he scored one goal for US Macouria in 2014.

He moved to US de Matoury during the 2023–24 season, and he made ten appearances during the 2025–26 season.

== International career ==
He made his international debut for French Guiana national football team in 2008 and he retired in 2022. He debuted on 6 September 2008 during the 2–1 friendly loss against Martinique, and he scored his first goal for French Guiana on 25 September 2010 during the 7–0 victory against Saint Pierre and Miquelon during the 2010 Coupe de l'Outre-Mer.

He was part of the French Guiana team which finished in third place during the 2017 Caribbean Cup.

== Career statistics ==
=== International ===
Appearances and goals by national team and year
National team	Year	Apps	Goals
French Guiana	2008	2	0
French Guiana	2009	1	0
French Guiana	2010	4	1
French Guiana	2011	0	0
French Guiana	2012	13	1
French Guiana	2013	0	0
French Guiana	2014	9	0
French Guiana	2015	2	0
French Guiana	2016	7	3
French Guiana	2017	6	1
French Guiana	2018	6	1
French Guiana	2019	6	0
French Guiana	2020	0	0
French Guiana	2021	1	0
French Guiana	2022	6	1
Total		63	8

French Guiana score listed first, score column indicates score after each Evens goal.

International goals scored by Rhudy Evens
No.	Date	Venue	Cap	Opponent	Score	Result	Competition
1	25 September 2010	Parc des Sports Louis Boury, Gennevilliers, France	6	Saint Pierre and Miquelon	2–0	7–0	2010 Coupe de l'Outre-Mer
2	8 December 2012	Sir Vivian Richards Stadium, Antigua, Antigua and Barbuda	18	Jamaica	2–1	2–1	2014 Caribbean Cup qualification
3	26 March 2016	Bermuda National Stadium, Devonshire Parish, Bermuda	33	Bermuda	1–0	1–2	2017 Caribbean Cup qualification
4	7 June 2016	Estadio Olímpico Félix Sánchez, Santo Domingo, Dominican Republic	35	Dominican Republic	1–0	1–2	2017 Caribbean Cup qualification
5	9 November 2016	Stade Sylvio Cator, Port-au-Prince, Haiti	38	Haiti	4–2	5–2	2017 Caribbean Cup qualification
6	17 June 2017	Stade Municipal Dr. Edmard Lama, Remire-Montjoly, French Guiana	39	Barbados	2–0	3–0	Friendly
7	8 June 2018	Stade Pierre-Aliker, Fort-de-France, Martinique	46	Guadeloupe	1–0	2–0	2018 Tournoi des 4
8	18 April 2022	Stade Georges-Chaumet, Cayenne, French Guiana	59	Guyana	1–2	1–2	Friendly
