= 2018–19 French Guiana Régional 1 =

French Guiana Régional 1
- Season: 2018–19
- Champions: Agouado
- Relegated: Sinnamary; Ouest
- Caribbean Club Shield: Agouado

The 2018–19 French Guiana Régional 1 was the 56th season of the French Guiana Régional 1, the top division football competition in French Guiana. The season began with the first round of league matches on 1 September 2018 and concluded with the second leg of the relegation play-off on 22 June 2019.

Agouado won the league for the first time and represented French Guiana in the 2020 Caribbean Club Shield. Sinnamary and Ouest finished 11th and 12th respectively and were relegated to French Guiana Régional 2 for the 2019–20 season. Saint-Georges finished 10th and contested the relegation play-off against Iracoubo. Saint-Georges won 7–0 on aggregate to remain in French Guiana Régional 1.

== Background ==
The league was first contested in 1961–62. Le Sport Guyanais had been the most successful team in the competition's history, winning 12 titles. Le Geldar were the defending champions having won their 11th league title the previous season. Agouado had never previously won the competition.

== Format ==
The league was contested on a double round robin basis in which each of the 12 teams would play every other team once at home and once away. In contrast to other football leagues, four points were awarded for a win, two points for a draw and once point for a loss. Teams tied on points were first separated on their head-to-head record and then by overall goal difference. The league winners would qualify for the 2020 Caribbean Club Shield while the teams finishing 11th and 12th would be relegated to French Guiana Régional 2. The team finishing in 10th would contest the relegation play-off against a team from Régional 2 in a two-legged home and away tie. The winner on aggregate would play in Régional 1 in 2019–20.

== League table ==
Pos	Team	Pld	W	D	L	GF	GA	GD	Pts	Qualification or relegation
1	Agouado	22	16	3	3	51	25	+26	73	Caribbean Club Shield
2	Le Geldar	22	13	8	1	53	22	+31	69	
3	Etoile Matoury	22	12	7	3	43	19	+24	65	
4	Matoury	22	13	1	8	40	30	+10	61 (Note: Matoury deducted 1 point.)	
5	Kourou	22	7	7	8	31	36	−5	50	
6	Cayenne	22	6	9	7	44	48	−4	49	
7	Oyapock	22	7	6	9	34	41	−7	48 (Note: Oyapock deducted 1 point. Head-to-head: Oyapock 6 points, Grand Santi 3 points.)	
8	Grand Santi	22	7	6	9	21	27	−6	48 (Note: Grand Santi deducted 1 point. Head-to-head: Oyapock 6 points, Grand Santi 3 points.)	
9	Rémire	22	7	4	11	28	37	−9	47	
10	Saint-Georges	22	7	1	14	31	50	−19	44	Relegation play-off
11	Sinnamary	22	4	6	12	26	38	−12	39 (Note: Sinnamary deducted 1 point.)	Relegated to French Guiana Régional 2
12	Ouest	22	2	4	16	15	44	−29	30 (Note: Ouest deducted 2 points.)	Relegated to French Guiana Régional 2

== Relegation play-off ==
In the relegation play-off, Saint-Georges played Iracoubo. Saint-Georges won both legs, 7–0 on aggregate so both teams remained in their respective divisions.
