= List of football clubs in French Guiana =

This is a list of association football clubs in French Guiana.

== The football clubs ==
- AJ Balata Abriba
- AJ Saint-Georges
- AS Oyapock
- ASC Agouado
- ASC Black Stars
- ASC Le Geldar
- ASC Remire
- ASL Sport Guyanais
- CSC de Cayenne
- EF Iracoubo
- US Macouria
- US Matoury
- US Sinnamary
