= 2014–15 French Guiana Division d'Honneur =

The 2014–15 French Guiana Division d'Honneur, the highest tier in men's football in French Guiana, was won by CSC de Cayenne.

== League table ==
Note that the point system in French Guiana is 4/win, 2/draw, 1/loss.

Pos	Team	Pld	W	D	L	GF	GA	GD	Pts
1	CSC de Cayenne (C)	22	16	4	2	40	15	+25	74
2	US Matoury	22	13	5	4	39	21	+18	65 (Note: 1 point deducted)
3	ASC Le Geldar	22	12	2	8	38	23	+15	60
4	SC Kouroucien	22	8	5	9	34	35	−1	50
5	ÉF Iracoubo	22	7	7	8	25	29	−4	50
6	ASC Remire	22	8	4	10	34	36	−2	49
7	Cosma Foot	22	6	9	7	24	26	−2	49
8	US Macouria	22	7	5	10	27	32	−5	48
9	ASU Grand Santi	22	7	5	10	25	33	−8	47
10	USL Montjoly	22	4	6	12	33	52	−19	40
11	US Sinnamary (R)	22	4	2	16	14	43	−29	35
12	Kourou FC (R)	22	9	4	9	26	25	+1	53

(C) Champions; (R) Relegated
Notes:

Kourou FC were ranked last for failing to maintain enough youth teams.

NB: The table shows 4 more losses than wins and an overall goal difference of -11, due to award of matches between Grand Santi and Matoury in round 14 and Kourou FC and Sinnamary in round 19.
