= 2021–22 Coupe de France preliminary rounds =

2021–22 Coupe de France
Coupe Charles Simon

Tournament details
- Country: France

The 2021–22 Coupe de France preliminary rounds made up the qualifying competition to decide which teams took part in the main competition from seventh round. This was the 105th season of the main football cup competition of France. The competition was organised by the French Football Federation (FFF) and was normally open to all clubs in French football, as well as clubs from the overseas departments and territories (Guadeloupe, French Guiana, Martinique, Mayotte, New Caledonia, Tahiti, Réunion, Saint Martin, and Saint Pierre and Miquelon).

The six (or more, if required) preliminary rounds were organised by the 13 Regional leagues from the mainland, and the 6 Regional leagues of the overseas departments and territories. They took place between June and November 2021.

== Schedule ==
Other than for the overseas leagues, the general schedule for the preliminary rounds was as follows:

Round	Date
First round	22 or 29 August 2021
Second round	29 August or 5 September 2021
Third round	19 September 2021
Fourth round	3 October 2021
Fifth round	17 October 2021
Sixth round	31 October 2021

== Leagues ==
The details of the qualifying rounds for each league is separated out to individual articles, to avoid this article being too lengthy.

=== Overseas leagues ===
A total of eleven clubs qualified from the overseas leagues, two each from Guadeloupe, French Guiana, Martinique, Réunion, and one each from Mayotte, New Caledonia and Tahiti. In 2020–21 Club Franciscain from Martinique survived longest in the competition, beating a number of overseas clubs in playoff rounds to reach the round of 32, equalling the record for an overseas team's progression in the competition. They eventually lost to Ligue 1 clubs Angers.

==== Mayotte ====
A total of 80 teams from the four division of the Mayotte league entered the competition. The preliminary round draw was published on 11 June 2021, with 16 (Note: M'Tsanga 2000 withdrew from the competition, giving FC Shingabwé an additional bye into the second round.) ties between clubs from Régional 4, the lowest division, and one team exempt to the first round.

A second preliminary round draw was due to be published in early July, but on 6 July 2021 the league announced that all teams would be qualified directly for the first round. The first round draw, including the remaining clubs, was published on 22 July 2021.

The round of 32 was drawn on 20 August 2021, originally to be played on 4 September 2021. The round of 16 and quarter final draws were published on 15 September 2021. The semi-final draw was published on 1 October 2021.

This match was played on 30 October 2021.

Final: Mayotte
Tie no	Home team (tier)	Score	Away team (tier)
1.	(Mayotte) AS Rosador (R1)	0–4	AS Jumeaux de M'zouazia (R1) (Mayotte)

Note: Mayotte League structure (no promotion to French League structure):
Régionale 1 (R1)
Régionale 2 (R2)
Régionale 3 (R3)
Régionale 4 (R4)

==== Réunion ====
As was the case last season, just sixteen teams were entered into the draw, all from Régionale 1, the top division of the Réunion football league, with the calendar, comprising three qualifying rounds (named fourth, fifth and sixth) being published in May 2021.

The fourth round draw was made on 13 July 2021.

These matches were played on 23 and 24 October 2021.

Sixth round results: Réunion
Tie no	Home team (tier)	Score	Away team (tier)
1.	(Réunion) JS Saint-Pierroise (R1)	0–1	ASC Makes (R1) (Réunion)
2.	(Réunion) AS Excelsior (R1)	2–3	Saint-Denis FC (R1) (Réunion)

Note: Reúnion League structure (no promotion to French League structure):
Régionale 1 (R1)
Régionale 2 (R2)

==== French Guiana ====
A total of 33 teams from the two divisions of the French Guiana league entered the competition. This required a single-fixture round to take place before the first full round. The round naming convention used by the league aligns with those used for the mainland competition, so this competition started with the second round. The draw for both second and third rounds was published on 9 October 2021.

These matches were played on 6 November 2021.

Sixth round results: French Guiana
Tie no	Home team (tier)	Score	Away team (tier)
1.	(French Guiana) ASC Ouest (R1)	1–1 (4–3 p)	ASC Rémire (R1) (French Guiana)
2.	(French Guiana) CSC Cayenne (R1)	1–1 (9–8 p)	ASU Grand Santi (R1) (French Guiana)

Note: French Guiana League structure (no promotion to French League structure):
Régional 1 (R1)
Régional 2 (R2)

==== Martinique ====
Due to the continuing COVID-19 pandemic in Martinique, football in the territory was still suspended in mid-October. In order to participate in the main competition, the Martinique Football League were informed by the FFF on 11 October 2021 that they must conclude the qualifying competition by 15 November 2021. On 19 October, the league published plans for an eight-team competition, starting on 3 November.

These matches were played on 6 and 7 November 2021.

Sixth round results: Martinique
Tie no	Home team (tier)	Score	Away team (tier)
1.	(Martinique) Club Colonial (R1)	1–0	Golden Lion FC (R1) (Martinique)
2.	(Martinique) Club Franciscain (R1)	1–0	Assaut de Saint-Pierre (R1) (Martinique)

==== Guadeloupe ====
Due to the continuing COVID-19 pandemic in Guadeloupe, football in the territory was still suspended in mid-October. In order to allow two teams to join the main competition in November, the Guadeloupe Football League announced on 18 October 2021, via their Facebook page, an eight-team qualifying competition starting on 30 October 2021.

These matches were played on 6 and 7 November 2021.

Sixth round results: Guadeloupe
Tie no	Home team (tier)	Score	Away team (tier)
1.	(Guadeloupe) Jeunesse Evolution (R1)	0–2	Solidarité-Scolaire (R1) (Guadeloupe)
2.	(Guadeloupe) ASG Juventus de Sainte-Anne (R1)	0–3	AS Gosier (R1) (Guadeloupe)

==== Saint Pierre and Miquelon ====
The Overseas Collectivity of Saint Pierre and Miquelon has only three teams, so there was just one match in each of two rounds, with one team receiving a bye to the second round. The first round took place on 7 July 2021, and the second round took place on 24 July 2021. The winner, A.S. Saint Pierraise, gained entry to the third round draw of the Pays de la Loire region.

=== Nouvelle-Aquitaine ===
A total of thirteen teams qualified from the Nouvelle-Aquitaine preliminary rounds. In 2020–21, US Lège Cap Ferret and Stade Poitevin FC progressed furthest in the main competition, reaching the round of 64 before losing to Aubagne FC and Canet Roussillon FC respectively.

On 13 July 2021, the league announced that a total of 689 teams had entered from the region. The first round would consist of 296 ties, featuring all teams from Régional 3 and below, plus 25 teams from Régional 2. The 45 exempted teams from Régional 2 and all 36 teams from Régional 1 entered at the second round stage. The 12 Championnat National 3 teams entered at the third round stage and the 4 Championnat National 2 teams entered at the fourth round stage.

These matches were played on 30 and 31 October 2021.

Sixth round results: Nouvelle Aquitaine
Tie no	Home team (tier)	Score	Away team (tier)
1.	Limens JSA (8)	3–0	FC Doazit (7)
2.	CS Feytiat (6)	2–1	FC Bassin d'Arcachon (6)
3.	ES La Rochelle (6)	0–1	Bergerac Périgord FC (4)
4.	Langon FC (7)	0–2	Stade Poitevin FC (5)
5.	SAG Cestas (6)	2–1	FC Bressuire (5)
6.	AS Nontron-Saint-Pardoux (7)	0–3	FC Libourne (5)
7.	AS Le Taillan (8)	1–1 (3–4 p)	ESA Brive (6)
8.	US Lormont (6)	0–2	Stade Bordelais (5)
9.	AS Panazol (7)	2–1	SA Moncoutant (7)
10.	ES Guérétoise (6)	2–0	ES Beaumont-Saint-Cyr (7)
11.	CS Lantonnais (8)	1–2	US Chauvigny (5)
12.	AS Puymoyen (8)	0–6	Trélissac-Antonne Périgord FC (4)
13.	Angoulême Charente FC (4)	1–0	CA Neuville (5)

=== Pays de la Loire ===
A total of eleven teams qualified from the Pays de la Loire preliminary rounds. In 2020–21, Voltigeurs de Châteaubriant and Olympique Saumur FC progressed furthest in the main competition, reaching the round of 16 before losing to Montpellier and Toulouse respectively.

On 7 July 2021, the league announce that 532 teams had entered from the region.

On 21 July 2021, the league published the first round draw along with further details of the structure of the competition. 482 teams entered at the first round stage, from district divisions, Régional 3 and Régional 2. The remaining nine teams from Régional 2 entered at the second round stage. 22 clubs from Régional 1 and 12 from Championnat National 3 entered at the third round stage, along with the qualifier from Saint Pierre and Miguelon. The two clubs from Championnat National 2 entered at the fourth round stage and the three clubs from Championnat National entered at the fifth round stage. The second round draw was published on 1 September 2021. The fifth round draw was published on 6 October 2021. The sixth round draw was published on 19 October 2021.

These matches were played on 30 and 31 October 2021.

Sixth round results: Pays de la Loire
Tie no	Home team (tier)	Score	Away team (tier)
1.	Nantes Saint-Pierre (8)	0–2	SO Cholet (3)
2.	Pouzauges Bocage FC (5)	1–2	Le Mans FC (3)
3.	FC Pellouailles-Corze (9)	0–4	Olympique Saumur FC (5)
4.	AS Sautron (5)	2–4	ESOF La Roche-sur-Yon (6)
5.	Vendée Poiré-sur-Vie Football (5)	0–0 (2–4 p)	La Roche VF (5)
6.	SC Beaucouzé (6)	1–2	Les Herbiers VF (4)
7.	FC Olonne Château (6)	1–3	Voltigeurs de Châteaubriant (4)
8.	USSA Vertou (5)	1–2	Stade Lavallois (3)
9.	Luçon FC (7)	3–0	AS Le Mans Villaret (7)
10.	AS Saint-Pierre-Montrevault (7)	1–1 (2–3 p)	USJA Carquefou (7)
11.	La Suze FC (6)	1–1 (5–6 p)	US Philbertine Football (5)

=== Centre-Val de Loire ===
A total of six teams qualified from the Centre-Val de Loire preliminary rounds. In 2020–21, SO Romorantin progressed furthest in the main competition, reaching the round of 32 before losing to Voltigeurs de Châteaubriant.

On 15 July 2021, the league published the draw for the first three rounds of the competition, the preliminary round, first round and second round. A total of 244 teams from the region entered the competition. 50 teams from District 3 and District 4 levels entered in the preliminary round, with a single District 3 team exempted to the first round. The 84 remaining District level teams entered at the first round stage. 67 teams from the Régional leagues entered at the second round stage. The 10 Championnat National 3 teams entered at the third round stage, the 6 Championnat National 2 teams entered at the fourth round stage, the 2 Championnat National teams entered at the fifth round stage.

The third round draw was published on 7 September 2021. The fourth round draw was published on 21 September 2021. The fifth round draw was published on 5 October 2021. The sixth round draw was made on 19 October 2021.

These matches were played on 30 and 31 October 2021.

Sixth round results: Centre-Val de Loire
Tie no	Home team (tier)	Score	Away team (tier)
1.	Joué-lès-Tours FCT (7)	0–10	US Orléans (3)
2.	Vierzon FC (5)	1–0	Tours FC (6)
3.	FC Déolois (5)	1–1 (2–4 p)	J3S Amilly (5)
4.	FC Ouest Tourangeau (5)	0–0 (5–3 p)	LB Châteauroux (3)
5.	US Châteauneuf-sur-Loire (5)	1–2	C'Chartres Football (4)
6.	CS Mainvilliers (7)	2–2 (4–3 p)	FC Saint-Jean-le-Blanc (5)

=== Corsica ===
Two teams qualified from the Corsica preliminary rounds. In 2020–21, Gazélec Ajaccio progressed furthest in the main competition, reaching the round of 32 before losing to Lille.

On 28 July 2021, the league announced that a total of 33 teams from the region had entered. A preliminary round, analogous to the second round in other regions, featured four clubs, with the winners going through to the third round, where they were joined by all other clubs from Championnat National 3 and below. The single Championnat National club joined the competition at the fifth round stage. The third round draw was published on 26 August 2021. The fourth round draw was published on 23 September 2021. The fifth round draw was published on 7 October 2021. The sixth round draw was made on 21 October 2021.

These matches were played on 30 and 31 October 2021.

Sixth round results: Corsica
Tie no	Home team (tier)	Score	Away team (tier)
1.	FC Balagne (6)	0–0 (2–4 p)	FC Bastia-Borgo (3)
2.	Gazélec Ajaccio (5)	3–0 (Note: Tie reversed from original draw.)	USC Corte (5)

=== Bourgogne-Franche-Comté ===
A total of eight teams qualified from the Bourgogne-Franche-Comté preliminary rounds. In 2020–21, UF Mâconnais progressed furthest in the main competition, reaching the round of 64 before losing to FC Saint-Louis Neuweg.

On 8 July 2021, the league declared that 408 teams entered from the region, with 324 entering at the first round stage, 58 exempt to the second round (31 from Régionale 2 and all teams from Régionale 1). 12 Championnat National 3 teams entered at the third round stage, 3 Championnat National 2 teams at the fourth round stage and the remaining 8 clubs being part of the main draw.

The first round draw was published on 9 July 2021. The second round draw was published on 24 August 2021. The third round draw was published on 31 August 2021. The fourth round draw was published on 21 September 2021. The fifth round draw was made on 5 October 2021. The sixth round draw was made on 21 October 2021.

These matches were played on 30 and 31 October 2021.

Sixth round results: Bourgogne-Franche-Comté
Tie no	Home team (tier)	Score	Away team (tier)
1.	Jura Sud Foot (4)	1–0	FC Grandvillars (5)
2.	FC Champagnole (6)	2–4	FC Morteau-Montlebon (5)
3.	ES Fauverney-Rouvres-Bretenière (7)	0–1	Jura Dolois Football (5)
4.	FR Saint Marcel (7)	1–1 (10–9 p)	Louhans-Cuiseaux FC (4)
5.	ASC Saint-Apollinaire (5)	2–1	US La Charité (6)
6.	Jura Lacs Foot (6)	1–2	Bresse Jura Foot (7)
7.	AS Levier (6)	1–5	Union Cosnoise Sportive (6)
8.	Entente Roche-Novillars (6)	1–2	RC Lons-le-Saunier (6)

=== Grand Est ===
A total of nineteen teams qualified from the Grand Est preliminary rounds. In 2020–21, CS Sedan Ardennes progressed furthest in the main competition, reaching the round of 16 before losing to Angers.

On 30 July 2021, the league announced that a total of 943 teams had entered from the region. 820 teams entered at the first round stage, with clubs from all district level leagues and Régionale 3 included. Additionally, seven Régionale 2 teams, drawn at random, were included at this stage to take account of the late promotion of Sedan. The remaining 70 Régionale 2 teams were exempted to the second round. The second round draw was published on 31 August 2021. The third round deaw was published on 14 September 2021. The fourth round draw was published on 23 September 2021. The fifth round draw was published on 6 October 2021. The sixth round draw was made on 20 October 2021.

These matches were played on 30 and 31 October 2021.

Sixth round results: Grand Est
Tie no	Home team (tier)	Score	Away team (tier)
1.	FC Christo (7)	0–5	FC Éloyes (8)
2.	Chaumont FC (6)	1–3	RS Magny (7)
3.	US Raon-l'Étape (5)	1–2	EF Reims Sainte-Anne Châtillons (6)
4.	AS Morhange (7)	0–0 (13–12 p)	ES Gandrange (7)
5.	FCF La Neuvillette-Jamin (8)	0–9	RC Champigneulles (6)
6.	CS Sedan Ardennes (3)	2–2 (4–3 p)	SAS Épinal (4)
7.	GS Neuves-Maisons (7)	0–2	ES Thaon (5)
8.	UL Plantières Metz (8)	2–1	AS Haut-du-Lièvre Nancy (8)
9.	APM Metz (6)	0–2 (Note: Tie reversed from original draw.)	US Thionville Lusitanos (7)
10.	FC Nogentais (6)	3–2	CA Villers-Semeuse (7)
11.	FC Rossfeld (7)	0–1	US Sarre-Union (5)
12.	AS Huningue (7)	2–3	FC Soleil Bischheim (6)
13.	AS Réding (8)	0–9	SC Schiltigheim (4)
14.	ES Molsheim-Ernolsheim (7)	0–0 (5–4 p)	US Behren-lès-Forbach (8)
15.	FCO Strasbourg Koenigshoffen (7)	1–1 (0–3 p)	AS Illzach Modenheim (6)
16.	FC Hagenthal-Wentzwiller (9)	0–2	FC Mulhouse (5)
17.	FC Sarrebourg (6)	1–1 (5–4 p)	FC Saint-Louis Neuweg (5)
18.	ASL Kœtzingue (7)	0–0 (4–2 p)	FC Obermodern (6)
19.	ASC Biesheim (5)	1–1 (5–4 p)	FA Illkirch Graffenstaden (5)

=== Méditerranée ===
A total of five teams qualified from the Méditerranée preliminary rounds. In 2020–21, Aubagne FC progressed furthest in the main competition, reaching the round of 32 before losing to Toulouse.

On 9 July 2021, the league announced that 246 teams had entered the competition from the region, and that because of the number of teams a preliminary round would need to take place. On 26 July 2021, the league published the draw for the preliminary round, with 30 teams entering from the district league level. The first round draw, which saw the entry of the remaining district level teams and teams from Régionale 2, was published on 9 August 2021. The second round draw, which saw the entry of the remaining Régionale 2 teams and those from Régionale 1, was published on 31 August 2021. The third round draw was published on 8 September 2021. The fourth round draw was published on 21 September 2021. The draws for the fifth and sixth round were made on 6 October 2021.

These matches were played on 31 October 2021.

Sixth round results: Méditerranée
Tie no	Home team (tier)	Score	Away team (tier)
1.	Gardia Club (7)	0–1	AS Cannes (5)
2.	AS Aix-en-Provence (9)	0–4	Aubagne FC (4)
3.	ES Cannet Rocheville (5)	3–0	US Marseille Endoume (6)
4.	FC Mougins Côte d'Azur (8)	0–2	FC Istres (5)
5.	FC Martigues (4)	4–3	Marignane Gignac FC (4)

=== Occitanie ===
A total of ten teams qualified from the Occitanie preliminary rounds. In 2020–21, Canet Roussillon FC progressed furthest in the competition, reaching the quarter-finals, beating Marseille along the way, before losing to Montpellier.

On 9 July 2021, the league announced that 509 teams had entered from the region. On 23 July 2021, the draw for the first two rounds was published. As in previous seasons, the draw for these rounds was made within individual districts of the league, with a few teams being drawn out of district to ensure a balanced draw. 424 teams entered at the first round stage, from the District leagues and Régional 3. A further 66 teams from Régional 2 and Régional 1 entered at the second round stage. The third round draw, which saw the entry of the Championnat National 3 teams from the region, was published on 17 September 2021. The fourth round draw, which saw the entry of the Championnat National 2 teams, was published on 23 September 2021. The fifth round draw, which saw the entry of the single Championnat National tean in the region, was made on 6 October 2021. The sixth round draw was published on 20 October 2021.

These were played on 30 and 31 October 2021.

Sixth round results: Occitanie
Tie no	Home team (tier)	Score	Away team (tier)
1.	US Seysses-Frouzins (7)	0–2	Canet Roussillon FC (4)
2.	Olympique Alès (5)	4–3	Blagnac FC (5)
3.	Toulouse Métropole FC (6)	3–1	AS Rousson (6)
4.	FC Langlade (10)	0–0 (6–5 p)	FC Alberes Argelès (5)
5.	FC Vauverdois (7)	1–2	AS Frontignan AC (6)
6.	GC Uchaud (7)	1–1 (5–6 p)	JS Chemin Bas d'Avignon (7)
7.	US Revel (6)	0–0 (6–7 p)	RCO Agde (5)
8.	Luc Primaube FC (7)	1–1 (4–5 p)	Montauban FCTG (7)
9.	FC Chusclan-Laudun-l'Ardoise (8)	1–0 (Note: The original match on 31 October 2021 ended 1–0, but a technical challenge was made by Union Saint-Estève Espoir Perpignan Méditerannée Métropole due to a missing signature on the license of one of the FC Chusclan-Laudun-l'Ardoise players. The ruling commission of the Occitanie league ordered the game to be replayed on 7 November 2021, without the player in question being involved. However, on 6 November 2021, the appeal commission of the league overturned this decision, ruling that the original result stood.)	Union Saint-Estève Espoir Perpignan Méditerannée Métropole (6)
10.	AS Muret (5)	1–1 (5–4 p)	L'Union Saint-Jean FC (6)

=== Hauts-de-France ===
A total of twenty teams qualified from the Hauts-de-France preliminary rounds. In 2020–21, US Boulogne progressed furthest in the main competition, reaching the round of 16 before losing to Canet Roussillon FC.

On 21 July 2021, the Oise district league published that 1024 teams from the region had entered the competition. Draws for the first two rounds were carried out separately by district leagues during July, with 818 teams in total entering at the first round stage, and 187 at the second round stage. The third round draw was published on 13 September 2021. The fourth round draw was published on 23 September 2021. The fifth round draw was made on 7 October 2021. The sixth round draw was made on 19 October 2021.

These matches were played on 30 and 31 October 2021.

Sixth round results: Hauts-de-France
Tie no	Home team (tier)	Score	Away team (tier)
1.	Calonne-Ricouart FC Cite 6 (8)	2–2 (4–3 p)	Olympique Grande-Synthe (6)
2.	Internationale Soissonnaise (7)	0–1	AC Amiens (5)
3.	Carabiniers Billy-Montigny (8)	0–2	Feignies Aulnoye FC (5)
4.	US Berlaimont (9)	0–6	ES Bully-les-Mines (7)
5.	US Camon (6)	0–2	AS Beauvais Oise (4)
6.	AS Berck (9)	2–4	FC Raismes (7)
7.	Villeneuve-d'Ascq Métropole (8)	1–2	ES Anzin-Saint-Aubin (9)
8.	ESM Hamel (10)	1–0	FC Ailly-sur-Somme Samara (8)
9.	FC Seclin (7)	1–1 (5–6 p)	FC Dutemple (8)
10.	Iris Club de Croix (5)	0–0 (1–4 p)	FC Loon-Plage (6)
11.	US Maubeuge (5)	2–3	FC Chambly (3)
12.	US Escaudain (7)	1–1 (3–5 p)	AS Étaples (7)
13.	US Prémontré Saint-Gobain (9)	0–3	Stade Béthunois (6)
14.	SC Hazebrouck (6)	2–4	US Esquelbecq (7)
15.	US Mineurs Waziers (7)	4–2 (Note: Tie reversed from original draw.)	Mons AC (8)
16.	Olympique Marcquois Football (5)	1–1 (2–4 p)	AC Cambrai (6)
17.	RC Salouël (10)	2–2 (6–5 p)	US Portugais Roubaix Tourcoing (7)
18.	OS Aire-sur-la-Lys (7)	1–1 (11–12 p)	US Tourcoing FC (6)
19.	Olympique Saint-Quentin (4)	0–0 (3–4 p)	Wasquehal Football (5)
20.	FC Montigny-en-Gohelle (9)	0–2	Olympique Lumbrois (6)

=== Normandy ===
A total of eight teams qualified from the Normandy preliminary rounds. In 2020–21, US Quevilly-Rouen progressed furthest in the main competition, reaching the round of 64 before losing to Red Star.

On 15 July 2021, the league declared a total of 394 teams from the region entered the competition, with 318 entering at the first round stage and 59 at the second round stage. Eleven Championnat National 3 teams entered at the third round, two Championnat National 2 teams entered at the fourth round and one Championnat National team entered at the fifth round.

The first round draw was also published on 15 July 2021. The second round draw was published on 24 August 2021. The third round draw took place live on 6 September 2021. The fourth round draw took place on 23 September 2021. The fifth round draw was made on 7 October 2021. The sixth round draw was made on 21 October 2021.

These matches were played on 30 and 31 October 2021.

Sixth round results: Normandy
Tie no	Home team (tier)	Score	Away team (tier)
1.	FC Saint-Lô Manche (5)	1–0	ASPTT Caen (6)
2.	FC Saint-Julien Petit Quevilly (8)	1–0	FC Offranville (8)
3.	US Granville (4)	1–3	AG Caennaise (5)
4.	FC Rouen (4)	3–0	AS Cherbourg Football (5)
5.	Olympique Pavillais (6)	0–5	AS Trouville-Deauville (6)
6.	US Saint-Pairaise (7)	0–2	AS Val de Reuil-Vaudreuil-Poses (7)
7.	US Alençon (5)	0–3	Évreux FC 27 (5)
8.	JS Saint-Nicolas-d'Aliermont-Béthune (8)	1–2	CMS Oissel (5)

=== Brittany ===
A total of fourteen teams qualified from the Brittany preliminary rounds. In 2020–21, US Montagnarde progressed furthest in the main competition, reaching the round of 32 before losing to Olympique Saumur FC.

On 28 June 2021, the Brittany league announced that 701 teams had entered the competition. The first round draw was published on 29 July 2021, with 578 teams entering at that stage. The second round draw was published on 31 August 2021, with 105 teams from Régionale 2 and Régionale 1 entering at this stage. The third round draw was published on 9 September 2021, with the teams from Championnat National 3 entering at this stage. The fourth round draw was published on 23 September 2021, with the teams from Championnat National 2 entering at this stage. The fifth round draw, featuring the teams from Championnat National, was made on 6 October 2021. The sixth round draw was published on 20 October 2021.

These matches were played on 30 and 31 October 2021.

Sixth round results: Brittany
Tie no	Home team (tier)	Score	Away team (tier)
1.	Dinan-Léhon FC (5)	6–1	Ploërmel FC (6)
2.	AS Vitré (4)	0–0 (7–6 p)	GSI Pontivy (5)
3.	Lorient Sports (7)	0–1	CS Plédran (8)
4.	Keriolets de Pluvigner (6)	0–2	US Liffré (6)
5.	Plancoët-Arguenon FC (7)	3–0	Stade Pleudihennais (7)
6.	Arzelliz Ploudalmézeau (9)	0–7	US Saint-Malo (4)
7.	US Concarneau (3)	1–1 (3–4 p)	Stade Briochin (3)
8.	Lannion FC (5)	3–1	OC Cesson (6)
9.	FC Breteil-Talensac (6)	1–1 (2–4 p)	Vannes OC (4)
10.	US Perros-Louannec (7)	2–1	FC Guipry Messac (5)
11.	Auray FC (6)	0–1	Stade Plabennécois (4)
12.	AG Plouvorn (7)	0–2	Fougères AGLD (5)
13.	PD Ergué-Gabéric (6)	4–1	Vie au Grand Air Bohars (7)
14.	Gars de Saint-Yves (7)	2–2 (5–6 p)	US Trégunc (5)

=== Paris-Île-de-France ===
A total of eleven teams qualified from the Paris-Île-de-France preliminary rounds. In 2020–21, Red Star progressed furthest in the main competition, reaching the round of 16 before narrowly losing against Lyon on penalties.

On 27 July 2021, the league announced that 485 clubs from the region had entered the competition. It was also announced that 360 district level clubs would enter at the first round stage, with 8 exempt to the second round stage.

These matches were played on 30 and 31 October 2021.

Sixth round results: Paris-Île-de-France
Tie no	Home team (tier)	Score	Away team (tier)
1.	Salésienne de Paris (9)	2–4	Espérance Aulnay (6)
2.	US Torcy (6)	2–4	AS Chatou (6)
3.	RFC Argenteuil (8)	0–2	Cergy-Pontoise FC (6)
4.	US Sénart-Moissy (6)	1–1 (5–4 p)	FC Les Lilas (6)
5.	Blanc-Mesnil SF (5)	2–3	Football Club 93 Bobigny-Bagnolet-Gagny (4)
6.	FC Fleury 91 (4)	0–2	AS Poissy (4)
7.	Courbevoie Sports (7)	0–0 (1–4 p)	US Créteil-Lusitanos (3)
8.	JS Suresnes (7)	0–0 (8–9 p)	ESA Linas-Montlhéry (5)
9.	ES Nanterre (7)	3–1	ES Colombienne (6)
10.	Red Star F.C. (3)	3–0	US Lusitanos Saint-Maur (4)
11.	SFC Neuilly-sur-Marne (7)	0–1	FC Versailles 78 (4)

=== Auvergne-Rhône-Alpes ===
A total of nineteen teams qualified from the Auvergne-Rhône-Alpes preliminary rounds. In 2020–21, GFA Rumilly-Vallières progress furthest in the main competition, becoming the first fourth tier side to reach the semi-final by beating Toulouse in the quarter-finals, before losing to Monaco.

On 10 August 2021, the league announced that a record 947 clubs had entered the competition from the region. The draw for the first round, featuring 836 teams from the district leagues and Régional 3, was made on 2 August 2021. Nine clubs in scope were exempted to the second round. The second round draw was published on 23 August 2021, with the exempted clubs and clubs from Régional 2 entering. The third round draw took place on 8 September 2021, and saw the Régional 1 and Championnat National 3 teams entering. The fourth round draw took place on 22 September 2021, and saw the Championnat National 2 teams entering. The fifth round draw, which saw the Championnat National teams entering, was made on 6 October 2021. The sixth round draw was made on 21 October 2021.

These matches were played on 30 and 31 October 2021.

Sixth round results: Auvergne-Rhône-Alpes
Tie no	Home team (tier)	Score	Away team (tier)
1.	FC Roche-Saint-Genest (7)	1–1 (4–5 p)	Hauts Lyonnais (5)
2.	ES Saint-Mamet (9)	0–6	FC Villefranche (3)
3.	US Saint-Flour (6)	1–4	Le Puy Foot 43 Auvergne (4)
4.	Côte Chaude Sportif (7)	1–0	AS Moulins (5)
5.	Forez Donzy FC (9)	1–2	RC Vichy (6)
6.	US Beaumontoise (7)	0–2	Montluçon Football (5)
7.	Stade Amplepuisien (8)	1–1 (2–4 p)	FC Limonest Saint-Didier (5)
8.	US Blavozy (6)	1–0	FA Le Cendre (6)
9.	FC Chamalières (4)	0–1	Moulins Yzeure Foot (4)
10.	FC Saint-Cyr Collonges au Mont d'Or (8)	2–2 (3–0 p)	Entente Crest-Aouste (7)
11.	AS Sillingy (9)	1–4	Ain Sud Foot (5)
12.	AS Villeurbanne Éveil Lyonnais (9)	0–1	Vénissieux FC (6)
13.	CS Neuville (7)	1–0	FC Vaulx-en-Velin (5)
14.	FC La Tour-Saint-Clair (7)	1–6	Lyon La Duchère (4)
15.	AS Montchat Lyon (7)	4–0	AS Misérieux-Trévoux (6)
16.	ES Bressane Marboz (7)	0–2	Andrézieux-Bouthéon FC (4)
17.	Chambéry SF (5)	1–0	GFA Rumilly-Vallières (4)
18.	ES Tarentaise (7)	1–2	FC Bourgoin-Jallieu (5)
19.	Saint-Chamond Foot (7)	2–2 (8–9 p)	Football Bourg-en-Bresse Péronnas 01 (3)
