= Football in French Guiana =

- Country: French Guiana
- Governing body: Ligue de Football de la Guyane
- National teams: men's national team · women's national team

National competitions
- Coupe Guyane; Coupe de France; Coupe de France Féminine

Club competitions
- French Guiana Régional 1; French Guiana Régional 2; French Guiana Régional 1 Féminin

International competitions
- Caribbean Club Championship; CONCACAF Champions League; CONCACAF Gold Cup(Men's National Team); CONCACAF Nations League (Men's National Team); CONCACAF W Gold Cup(Women's National Team)

Association football – commonly known as football (or soccer in the United States and Canada), French: Association de football) – is a popular sport in French Guiana. The Ligue de Football de la Guyane – the region's national football governing body – runs the men's national team, the women's national team, organizes the annual Coupe Guyane tournament as well as administering the region's professional leagues the French Guiana Régional 1, French Guiana Régional 2, and French Guiana Régional 1 Féminin divisions. As an overseas department of France and member of the French Football Federation, teams are eligible to participate in the Coupe de France and Coupe de France Féminine. As members of Caribbean Football Union teams are eligible for the Caribbean Club Championship and the region's membership in CONCACAF allows teams to participate in that organizations club and national team competitions. French Guiana however is not a member of FIFA and is therefore ineligible to play in the World Cup.

== History ==
Football was introduced to the region during the early 20th Century. The men's national team played its first friendly against Dutch Guiana (now Suriname) in 1936 losing 1 to 3. They met Dutch Guiana again for their first competitive match in the Coupe des Caraibes, losing again 2:4. Known as Yana Dòkò, the team gained its first victory in a competitive match against British Guiana(now Guyana) in October 1948 with a score of 3:2.

Despite being geographically in the subcontinent of South America, the local authorities chose to participate in the competition where most of the countries and dependent territories of the Caribbean area are located. The Ligue de Football de la Guyane was founded in 1962 has been affiliated to the FFF since 1963 and a member of the Caribbean Football Union since 1978. In 1985, women's football developed, with the introduction of a league and national team, including a match against Haiti. However, as the sport lost prominence, this lasted only until 1993 before it diminished. The league would be revived in 2009, with the national team returning for friendlies only across the intervening years against Martinique in 2010 and Suriname in 2014.

French Guiana gained full membership to CONCACAF in 2013 having been an associate member since 1978.

== League system ==
The French Guiana football league system is a series of interconnected leagues for club football.

The highest tier of men's football, the French Guiana Régional 1, is equivalent to the sixth tier of football in France. There are twelve participants in Régional 1, with teams finishing in the two bottom spots being relegated to the Régional 2.

Level	League(s)/Division(s
1	French Guiana Régional 1; 12 clubs
	↓↑ 2 clubs
2	French Guiana Régional 2; 21 clubs divided in 2 series, one of 13 clubs and one of 8 clubs

The women's league system consists of a sole division, with 6 clubs as of 2025-26 in the French Guiana Régional 1 Féminin.

Level	League(s)/Division(s
1	French Guiana Régional 1 Féminin; 6 clubs

== Football stadiums in French Guiana ==
Stadium	Capacity	City
Stade Georges-Chaumet	5,000	Cayenne
