= Wilfried Galimo =

Surinamese association football player

Personal information
- Full name: Wilfried Armand Galimo
- Date of birth: 2 May 1991 (age 35)
- Place of birth: Suriname
- Position: Forward

Team information
- Current team: Camon

Senior career*
Years	Team	Apps	(Gls)
–2018	US Matoury		
2018–2020	Etoile de Matoury		
2020–	Camon		

International career
2012	Suriname	4	(0)
- * Club domestic league appearances and goals

Wilfried Armand Galimo (born 2 May 1991) is a Surinamese footballer who plays as a attacker for Camon.

== Career ==
Galimo started his career with US de Matoury.

In 2018, Galimo signed fr Etoile de Matoury.

In 2012, Galimo played in the Suriname national football team. In 2020, Galimo signed for French side Camon.

In 2020, he signed for Camon.
