= 2017–18 French Guiana Régional 1 =

French Guiana Régional 1
- Season: 2017–18
- Champions: Le Geldar

The 2017–18 French Guiana Régional 1 is the 57th season of the French Guiana Régional 1, the top tier of football in French Guiana. The season began on 14 September 2017 and ended on 16 June 2018.

== Standings ==
Note: 4 points for a win, 2 points for a draw, 1 point for a defeat.

Pos	Team	Pld	W	D	L	GF	GA	GD	Pts
1	ASC Le Geldar (C)	24	17	5	2	61	24	+37	80
2	AS Etoile Matoury	24	17	4	3	49	24	+25	79
3	US Matoury	24	13	7	4	40	19	+21	69 (Note: 1 point deducted)
4	ASC Agouado	24	11	5	8	53	41	+12	62
5	ASU Grand Santi	24	11	4	9	39	33	+6	59 (Note: 2 points deducted)
6	US Sinnamary	24	10	6	8	39	35	+4	59
7	AJ Saint-Georges	24	9	5	10	41	42	−1	56
8	CSC de Cayenne	24	8	6	10	27	35	−8	54
9	Kourou FC	24	8	5	11	29	38	−9	53
10	ASC Remire	24	8	5	11	47	38	+9	53
11	Olympique de Cayenne	24	7	2	15	24	43	−19	47
12	EF Iracoubo	24	4	3	17	15	60	−45	38
13	SC Kouroucien	24	2	5	17	18	50	−32	34

(C) Champions
