= French Guiana Régional 1 =

Association football league in French Guiana

- Organising body: Ligue de Football de la Guyane
- Founded: 1961
- First season: 1962–63
- Country: French Guiana
- Confederation: CONCACAF
- Number of clubs: 19
- Level on pyramid: 1
- Relegation to: French Guiana Régional 2
- International cup: Caribbean Shield
- Current champions: Sinnamary (2024–25)
- Most championships: ASL Le Sport Guyanais (12 titles)
- Website: guyane.footeo.com

The French Guiana Régional 1 is the highest tier of men's football in French Guiana. It was created in 1961 and is organized by the Ligue de Football de la Guyane. There are twelve participants in the league, with teams finishing in the two bottom spots being relegated to the Régional 2. The division is equivalent to the sixth tier of football in France, the Régional 1.

Despite being a league competition in CONCACAF, none of the French Guianan teams have recently played in the Caribbean Club Championship or the CONCACAF Champions League. Their last appearance was in the 1992 CONCACAF Champions' Cup, represented by ASC Le Geldar.

== Clubs ==
The following clubs competed during the 2022-2023 season.

Team	Home city	Home ground
Agouado	Apatou	Stade de Moutendé
Cayenne	Cayenne	Stade Georges Chaumet
Charvein	Mana	
Dynamo de Soula	Macouria	
Étoile Matoury	Matoury	Stade Municipal Matoury
Grand Santi	Mana	Stade Guy Mariette
Iracoubo	Iracoubo	Parc des Princes Iracoubo
Karib	Cayenne	Stade Georges Chaumet
Kouroucien	Kourou	Stade Bois Chaudat
Le Geldar	Kourou	Stade Bois Chaudat
Loyola	Rémire-Montjoly	Stade Municipal Dr. Edmard Lama
Matoury	Matoury	Stade Municipal Matoury
Montjoly	Rémire-Montjoly	Stade Municipal Dr. Edmard Lama
Montsinery	Montsinéry-Tonnegrande	Stade Municipal
Olympique Cayenne	Cayenne	Stade Georges Chaumet
Ouest	Saint-Laurent-du-Maroni	Stade René Long
Rémire	Remire-Montjoly	Stade Municipal Dr. Edmard Lama
Saint-Georges	Cayenne	Stade Georges Chaumet
Sinnamary	Sinnamary	Stade Omnisports

== Previous winners ==
- 1962–63 : Racing Club (Cayenne)
- 1963–64 : ASL Le Sport Guyanais (Cayenne)
- 1964–65 : AJ Saint-Georges (Cayenne)
- 1965–66 : ASL Le Sport Guyanais (Cayenne)
- 1966–67 : ASL Le Sport Guyanais (Cayenne)
- 1967–68 : ASL Le Sport Guyanais (Cayenne)
- 1968–69 : ASL Le Sport Guyanais (Cayenne)
- 1969–70 : ASL Le Sport Guyanais (Cayenne)
- 1970–71 : ASL Le Sport Guyanais (Cayenne)
- 1971–72 : ASL Le Sport Guyanais (Cayenne)
- 1972–73 : ASL Le Sport Guyanais (Cayenne)
- 1973–74 : ASL Le Sport Guyanais (Cayenne)
- 1974–75 : USL Montjoly (Montjoly)
- 1975–76 : USL Montjoly (Montjoly)
- 1976–77 : AS Club Colonial (Cayenne)
- 1977–78 : AS Club Colonial (Cayenne)
- 1978–79 : AS Club Colonial (Cayenne)
- 1979–80 : USL Montjoly (Montjoly)
- 1980–81 : USL Montjoly (Montjoly)
- 1981–82 : USL Montjoly (Montjoly)
- 1982–83 : AJ Saint-Georges (Cayenne)
- 1983–84 : AJ Saint-Georges (Cayenne)
- 1984–85 : ASC Le Geldar (Kourou)
- 1985–86 : ASL Le Sport Guyanais (Cayenne)
- 1986–87 : ASL Le Sport Guyanais (Cayenne)
- 1987–88 : ASC Le Geldar (Kourou)
- 1988–89 : ASC Le Geldar (Kourou)
- 1989–90 : SC Kouroucien (Kourou)
- 1990–91 : AS Club Colonial (Cayenne)
- 1991–92 : AS Club Colonial (Cayenne)
- 1992–93 : US Sinnamary (Sinnamary)
- 1993–94 : US Sinnamary (Sinnamary)
- 1994–95 : AS Jahouvey (Mana)
- 1995–96 : AS Club Colonial (Cayenne)
- 1996–97 : US Sinnamary (Sinnamary)
- 1997–98 : AS Jahouvey (Mana)
- 1998–99 : AJ Saint-Georges (Cayenne)
- 1999–00 : AJ Saint-Georges (Cayenne)
- 2000–01 : ASC Le Geldar (Kourou)
- 2001–02 : AJ Saint-Georges (Cayenne)
- 2002–03 : US Matoury (Matoury)
- 2003–04 : ASC Le Geldar (Kourou)
- 2004–05 : ASC Le Geldar (Kourou)
- 2005–06 : US Matoury (Matoury)
- 2006–07 : US Macouria (Macouria)
- 2007–08 : ASC Le Geldar (Kourou)
- 2008–09 : ASC Le Geldar (Kourou)
- 2009–10 : ASC Le Geldar (Kourou)
- 2010–11 : US Matoury (Matoury)
- 2011–12 : US Matoury (Matoury)
- 2012–13 : ASC Le Geldar (Kourou)
- 2013–14 : US Matoury (Matoury)
- 2014–15 : CSC Cayenne (Cayenne)
- 2015–16 : US Matoury (Matoury)
- 2016–17 : US Matoury (Matoury)
- 2017–18 : ASC Le Geldar (Kourou)
- 2018–19 : ASC Agouado (Apatou)
- 2019–20 : Olympique Cayenne (Cayenne)
- 2020–21 : abandoned
- 2021–22 : abandoned
- 2022–23 : Étoile Matoury
- 2023–24 : Étoile Matoury
- 2024–25 : Sinnamary

== Performance by club ==
Club	City	Titles	Last title
ASL Le Sport Guyanais	Cayenne	12	1986–87
ASC Le Geldar	Kourou	11	2017–18
AS Club Colonial/CSC Cayenne	Cayenne	7	2014–15
US Matoury	Matoury	7	2016–17
AJ Saint-Georges	Cayenne	6	2001–02
USL Montjoly	Montjoly	5	1981–82
US Sinnamary	Sinnamary	4	2024–25
AS Jahouvey	Mana	2	1997–98
Étoile Matoury	Matoury	2	2023–24
Racing Club	Cayenne	1	1962–63
SC Kouroucien	Kourou	1	1989–90
US Macouria	Macouria	1	2006–07
ASC Agouado	Apatou	1	2018–19
Olympique de Cayenne	Cayenne	1	2019–20

== Top goalscorers ==
Year	Best scorers	Team	Goals
2004–05	(French Guiana) Saint-Ange Golitin	AJ Saint-Georges	20
2005–06	(French Guiana) Guy Diagne	Le Geldar	23
2006–07	(French Guiana) Anson Hudson	Macouria	19
2022–23	(French Guiana) Souvenson Charlot	Le Geldar	17
2023–24	(French Guiana) Calvin Soga	Étoile Matoury	32
2024–25	(French Guiana) Jules Haabo	Étoile Matoury	25

== Multiple hat-tricks ==
Rank	Country	Player	Hat-tricks
1	(French Guiana)	Calvin Soga	2
2	(French Guiana)	Souvenson Charlot	1
2	(French Guiana)	Alan Cuti	1
2	(Suriname)	Gordon Doekoe	1
2	(French Guiana)	Jules Haabo	1
2	(French Guiana)	Jean-Luc Komsi	1
