= Ligue de football de la Guyane =

National football league

CONCACAF
- Founded: 1962
- Headquarters: Cayenne
- FIFA affiliation: N/A
- CONCACAF affiliation: 1978 (founding member of Caribbean Football Union); 2013 (full member)
- President: Jean Claude Labrador
- Website: Official site

The Ligue de Football de la Guyane (English: Guiana Football League) is the governing body of football in French Guiana. It has been a full member of CONCACAF since 2013. However, it is not a member of FIFA.

== See also ==
- French Guiana Championnat National
- French Guiana national football team
