= Stade Georges-Chaumet =

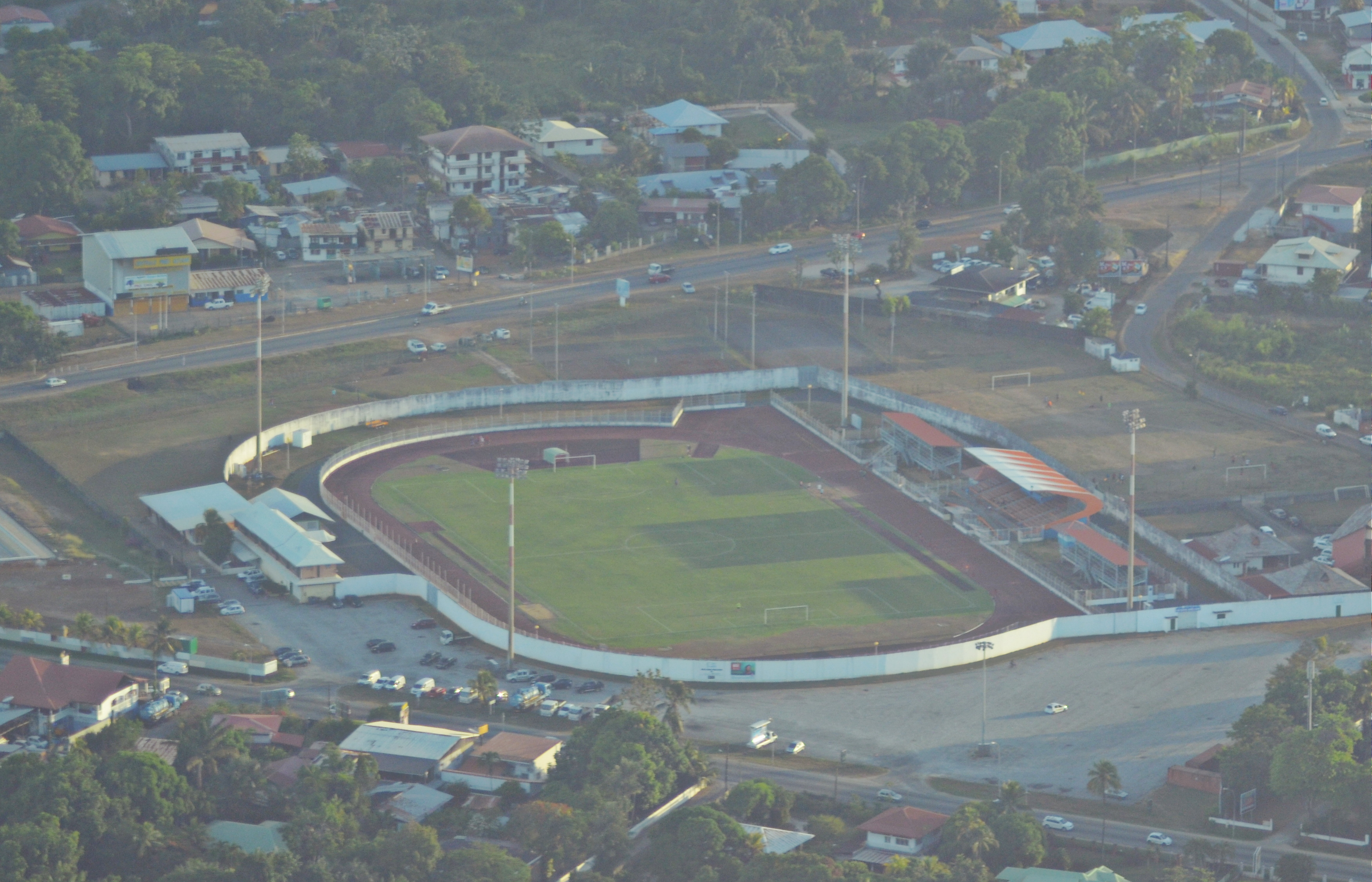
- Aerial photograph (2014)
- Interactive map of Stade Georges-Chaumet
- Former names: Stade de Baduel
- Location: Cayenne, French Guiana, France
- Coordinates: 4.932492°N 52.3118037°W
- Capacity: 5,000
- Surface: Natural turf

Construction
- Opened: 1965
- Renovated: 2012

Tenants
- CSC Cayenne; French Guiana national football team

Stade Georges-Chaumet (former name: Stade de Baduel) is a multi-use stadium in Cayenne, French Guiana. It is currently used mostly for football of the French Guiana national football team matches.

The stadium has a capacity of 5,000. It has natural turf and a synthetic 400m track. The central area of the stadium, named "la caquette", was renovated in 2012.

The stadium is also used for cultural events such as le Kayenn jazz festival.

In 2014, the stadium was renamed to Stade Georges-Chaumet.
