= Remire-Montjoly =

Commune in French Guiana, France

- Commune
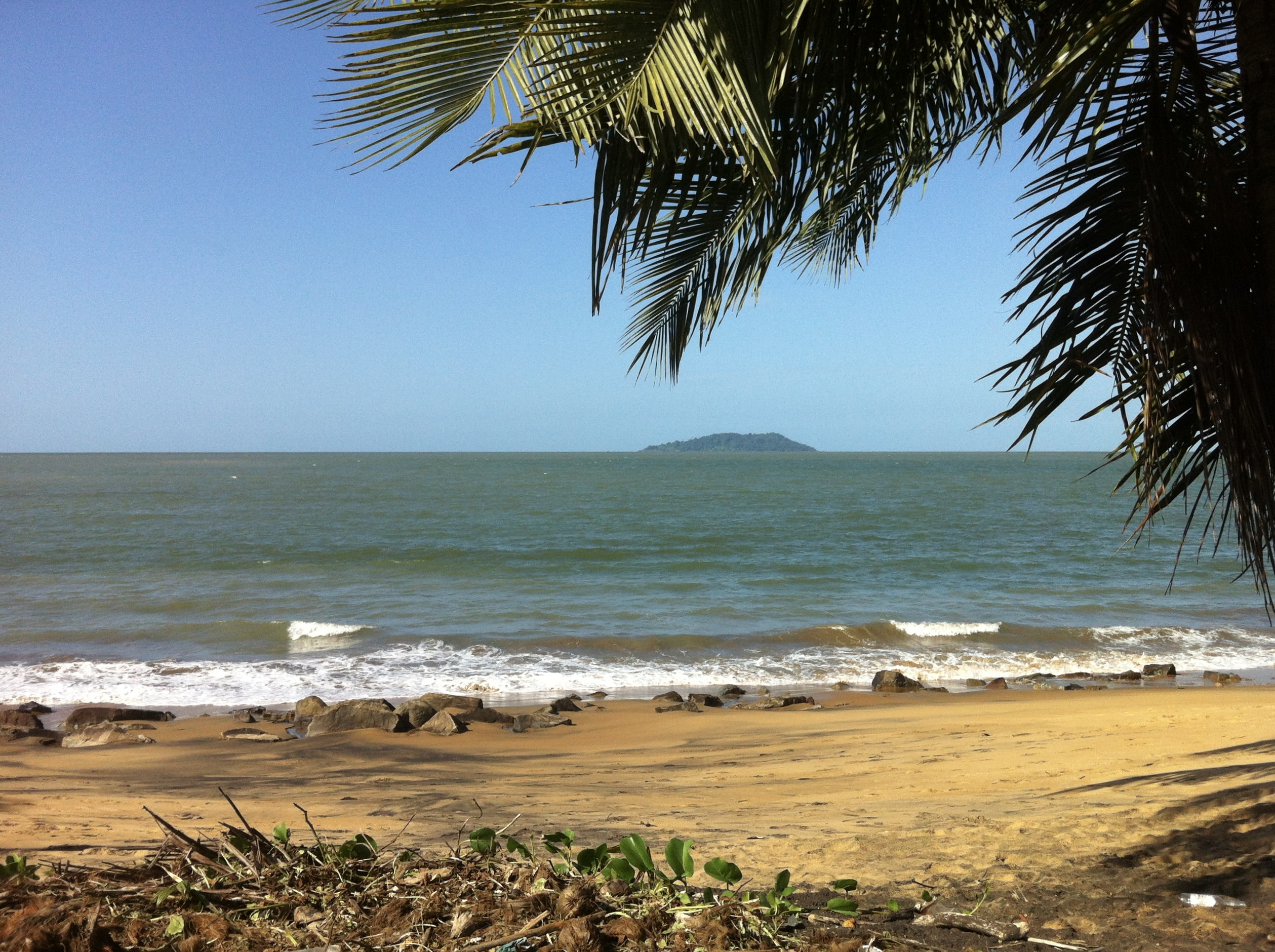
- Rémire-Montjoly beach

- Coat of arms

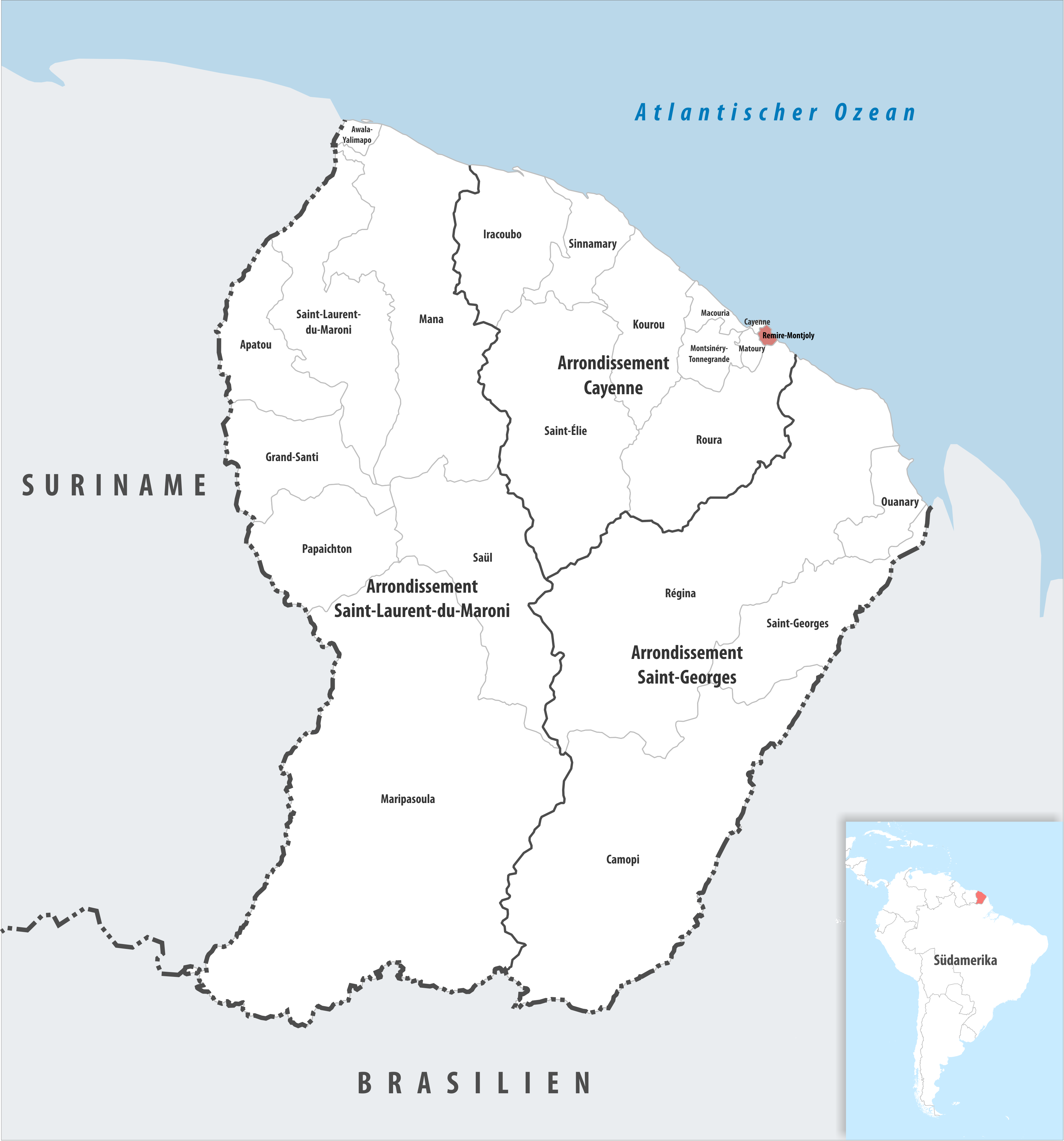
- Location of the commune (in red) within French Guiana
- Location of Remire-Montjoly
- Coordinates: 4°54′18″N 52°16′36″W
- Country: France
- Overseas region and department: French Guiana
- Arrondissement: Cayenne
- Intercommunality: CA Centre Littoral

Government
  - Mayor (2020–2026): Claude Plénet
- Area^{1}: 46.11 km^{2} (17.80 sq mi)
- Population (2023): 27,723
  - Density: 601.2/km^{2} (1,557/sq mi)
- Time zone: UTC−03:00
- INSEE/Postal code: 97309 /97354
- ^{1} French Land Register data, which excludes lakes, ponds, glaciers > 1 km^{2} (0.386 sq mi or 247 acres) and river estuaries.

Remire-Montjoly (French pronunciation: [ʁemiʁ mɔ̃ʒɔli]; often unofficially spelled Rémire-Montjoly; French Guianese Creole: Rémir-Monjoli) is a commune of French Guiana, an overseas region and department of France located on the northeast coast of South America.

Remire-Montjoly is a suburb of Cayenne, the capital préfecture and largest city of French Guiana. It is located to the south-east of Cayenne. Residential districts are located along some of the best beaches in the Cayenne area.

Cayenne and French Guiana's main seaport, the port of Dégrad des Cannes, is located in the commune of Remire-Montjoly, on the estuary of the river Mahury. Almost all of French Guiana's imports and exports pass through the port of Dégrad des Cannes.

== History ==
The name of the town Remire, formerly Armire, is of Galibi origin. The town was founded in October 1652 by missionaires. In 1656, Dutch Jews who had fled from Pernambuco, Brazil settled in Remire and built a sugar factory. Most of them left for Suriname when the French retook the area. In 1666, the Jesuits settled in the town, and started a sugar plantation. In 1765, the possessions of the Jesuits were ceased, and Remira became a tiny village in the shadow of Cayenne once more. In 1879, Remire was elevated to a community with its own mayor. After the eruption of Mount Pelée in 1902, many people from Martinique settled in the town.

The commune was originally called Remire, but on 27 March 1969 the name was officially changed to Remire-Montjoly to reflect the development of Montjoly, one of the two settlements located within the commune. With urban expansion, the settlements of Remire and Montjoly have fused with Cayenne into a single urban area, however Remire-Montjoly remains a commune that is administered separately from the commune of Cayenne.

== Population ==
Historical population
| Year | Pop. | ±% p.a. |
|---|---|---|
| 1967 | 2,062 | — |
| 1974 | 2,950 | +5.25% |
| 1982 | 6,773 | +10.95% |
| 1990 | 11,701 | +7.07% |
| 1999 | 15,555 | +3.21% |
| 2007 | 18,511 | +2.20% |
| 2012 | 20,689 | +2.25% |
| 2017 | 25,122 | +3.96% |
| 2023 | 27,723 | +1.66% |
Source: INSEE

== Fort Diamant ==
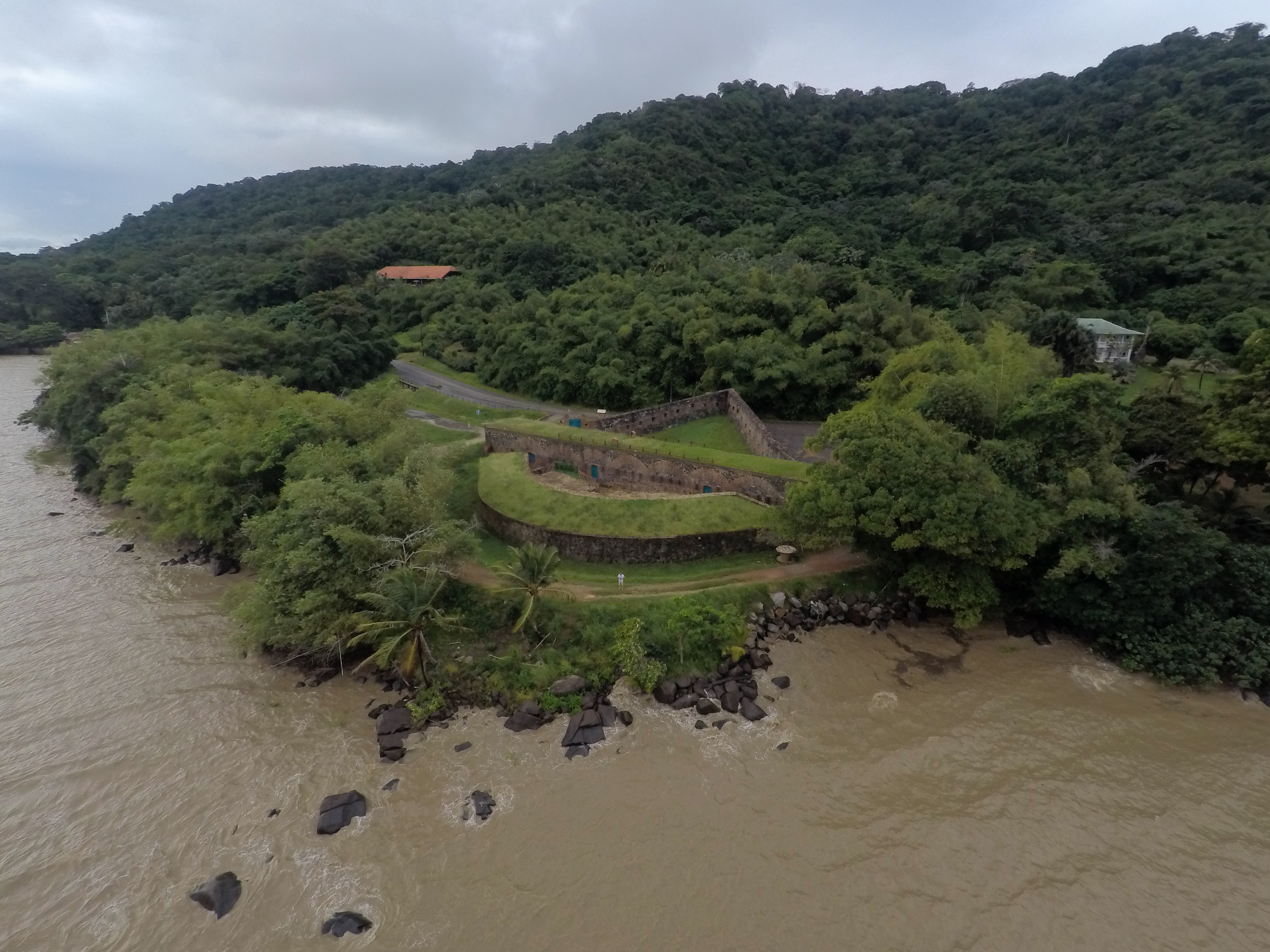
Fort Diamant

Fort Diamant is a coastal battery built in 1848 to protect Cayenne and the colony. The fort was built from basalt rubble and bricks and consists of three parts in a V-shape. The walls are two metres thick. Fort Diamant was classified as a historic monument in 1980, and renovated.

== Nature ==
Salines de Montjoly is a former saltworks and protected area in the commune. It is located in the urban area near the Atlantic Ocean, and contains a multitude of biomes like a beach used by sea turtles for nesting, and wetlands which are a refuge for birds. It also contains the only publicly accessible mangrove forest of French Guiana.

== Sports ==
Remire-Montjoly is home to ASC Rémire football team who play at the Stade Municipal Dr. Edmard Lama.

== Notable people ==
- Loïc Prévot (born 1998), sprinter

== See also ==
- Communes of French Guiana
- Dégrad des Cannes, the main harbour of French Guiana
- Résidence Arc-en-ciel, a village in the commune
