= Stade Municipal Dr. Edmard Lama =

- Interactive map of Stade Municipal Dr. Edmard Lama
- Location: Remire-Montjoly
- Coordinates: 4.8828325°N 52.2862811°W
- Capacity: 1,400
- Surface: Grass

Stade Municipal Dr. Edmard Lama is a stadium in Remire-Montjoly, a suburb of Cayenne, French Guiana. The venue was the host stadium for the 2015 CONCACAF Gold Cup qualification (CFU–UNCAF play-off)
