= SC Kouroucien =

French Guiana football club

- Full name: Sporte Clube Kouroucien
- Founded: 1977
- Ground: Stade de Bour
- Capacity: 2,500
- Chairman: Claude Rochefort
- Manager: Yvan Laveaux
- League: Championnat National
- 2024-25: 12th
Home colours	Away colours

SC Kouroucien is a French Guiana football club.

== Achievements ==
- French Guiana Championnat National:

1989–90
