= US Macouria =

U.S. Macouria
- Full name: Union Sportive de Macouria
- Ground: Stade Municipal, Macouria, French Guiana
- Capacity: 2,000
- Chairman: Steve Louvrier-Saint-Mary
- Manager: Olivier Ridarch
- League: Championnat National
- 2010–11: 5th
Home colours	Away colours

Union Sportive Macouria is a French Guiana football team playing at the top level. It is based in Macouria, and their home stadium is Stade Municipal.

== Achievements ==
- French Guiana Championnat National: 1

2006/07

- Coupe de Guyane: 1

2005/06

== The club in the French football structure ==
- French Cup: 2 appearances (0 wins)

1995/96, 2004/05

== Squad 2007/08 ==
Note: Flags indicate national team as defined under FIFA eligibility rules; some limited exceptions apply. Players may hold more than one non-FIFA nationality.

No.	Pos.	Nation	Player
—	GK	(French Guiana) GUF	Félici Akoeba
—	DF	(French Guiana) GUF	Thierry Dimanche
—	DF	(French Guiana) GUF	Ewald Sabajo
—	DF	(French Guiana) GUF	Patrick Rene
—	DF	(French Guiana) GUF	Yannick Ponet
—	DF	(French Guiana) GUF	Willem Glissant
—	DF	(French Guiana) GUF	Germaine Spencer
—	DF	(French Guiana) GUF	Keegan Bonett
—	DF	(French Guiana) GUF	Daniel Castor
—	DF	(French Guiana) GUF	Henrique Smail
—	DF	(French Guiana) GUF	Hervé Gervais
—	DF	(French Guiana) GUF	Olivier Ridarch
—	MF	(French Guiana) GUF	Albéric Amaranthe
—	MF	(French Guiana) GUF	Freddy Rheny

No.	Pos.	Nation	Player
—	MF	(French Guiana) GUF	José Tingo
—	MF	(French Guiana) GUF	Thierry Bourdon
—	MF	(French Guiana) GUF	Evans Morisseau
—	MF	(French Guiana) GUF	Sébastien Ventose
—	MF	(French Guiana) GUF	Joseph Bendayo
—	MF	(French Guiana) GUF	Erwin Pikimiento
—	MF	(French Guiana) GUF	Claude Dambury
—	MF	(French Guiana) GUF	Ricardo Saint Clair
—	FW	(French Guiana) GUF	Anson Hudson
—	FW	(French Guiana) GUF	Daniel Dambury
—	FW	(French Guiana) GUF	Mario Clothilde
—	FW	(French Guiana) GUF	Loan Azor
—	FW	(French Guiana) GUF	Christian Torvic
