= AJ Saint-Georges =

- Full name: Association Jeunesse de Saint-Georges
- Founded: 1954
- Ground: Stade de Baduel
- Capacity: 7,000
- Chairman: Fernand St. Clément
- Manager: Mathieu Montchâteau
- League: French Guiana Honor Division
- 2024–25: Excluded
Home colours	Away colours

AJ Saint-Georges are a French Guianese football club based in the country's capital Cayenne. They have won the French Guiana Championnat National six times: in 1965, 1983, 1984, 1999, 2000 and 2002. The club was relegated to Promotion d'Honneur (Second Level) in 2007. In 2026, the club plays in Regional 2.

== Achievements ==
- French Guiana Championnat National: 6

1964/65, 1982/83, 1983/84, 1998/99, 1999/00, 2001/02

- Coupe de Guyane: 14

1959/60, 1964/65, 1965/66, 1968/69, 1970/71, 1979/80, 1982/83, 1983/84, 1984/85, 1989/90, 1999/00, 2000/01, 2002/03, 2003/04

== The club in the French football structure ==
- French Cup : 7 appearances

1966/67, 1975/76, 1980/81, 1996/97, 1997/98, 1999/00, 2019-20.

Ties won:

1980/81 AJ Saint-Georges 0-0 Véloce Vannes US (aet, 7-6 pens), (rd 7)
