= ASC Rémire =

- Full name: Association Sportive et Culturelle Remire
- Short name: ASC Rémire
- Founded: 1974
- Ground: Stade Edmard Lama; Remire-Montjoly
- Capacity: 1,500
- Chairman: Amaranthe Horth Armide
- Manager: Georges Collard
- League: French Guiana Honor Division
- 2024–25: 6th
- Website: https://www.facebook.com/asc.remire

The Rémire Sports and Cultural Club (French: Association Sportive et Culturelle Remire), or simply known as ASC Rémire or Rémire is a Guianan football club based in Remire-Montjoly. The club competes in the Ligue de Guyane, the top tier of French Guianan football.

The club was founded in 1974, and play their home matches in the 1,500-capacity, Stade Municipal Dr. Edmard Lama, which is located near Remire-Montjoly. The primary colors for the club are orange and black.
