= US Sinnamary =

- Full name: Union Sportive de Sinnamary
- Founded: 1952
- Ground: Stade Omnisports, Sinnamary, French Guiana
- Capacity: 2,500
- Chairman: Rémy Poivre
- Manager: Aurél Favre
- League: Championnat National
- 2024–25: Champions
- Website: https://ussinnamary.footeo.com/
Home colours	Away colours

Union Sportive de Sinnamary is a French Guianese football club playing at the top level. It is based in Sinnamary. Their home stadium is Stade Omnisports.

== Achievements ==
- French Guiana Championnat National: 3

1992–93, 1993–94, 1996–97

- Coupe D.O.M.: 1

1993

- Coupe de Guyane: 3

1995–96, 1997–98, 2001–02

- Coupe de la Municipalité de Kourou: 1

1983–84

== Performance in CONCACAF competitions ==
- CONCACAF Champions' Cup: 2 appearances

1994 – Second Round (Caribbean) – Lost to Club Franciscain (Martinique) 5–2 on aggregate (stage 3 of 5)
1996 – First Round (Caribbean) – Withdrew against Prekesh (Suriname) (stage 1 of 4)

== The club in the French football structure ==
- Coupe de France: 1 appearance

1994–95
