= ASC Agouado =

Agouado
- Full name: ASC Agouado
- Short name: ASC Agouado
- Founded: 1996
- Ground: Stade de Moutendé, Apatou
- Capacity: 1,000
- Owner: Léandre Poulain
- President: Salvateur Poulain
- Manager: Germaine Rousseau
- League: Championnat National
- 2024–25: 5th
- Website: https://www.facebook.com/asc.agouado
Home colours	Away colours

ASC Agouado is a French Guianese football team based in Apatou that plays in the French Guiana Championnat National.

== Honors ==
- French Guiana Championnat
  - Winners (1): 2018–19
