= US de Matoury =

US Matoury
- Full name: Union Sportive de Matoury
- Ground: Stade Municipal, Matoury, French Guiana
- Capacity: 4,000
- Chairman: Gregley Meunier
- Manager: Jérémy Huguenot
- League: Championnat National
- 2023–24: 3rd
Home colours	Away colours	Third colours

Union Sportive de Matoury is a French Guianese football club playing at the top level. It is based in Matoury. Their home stadium is Stade Municipal.

== Former players ==
- (Suriname) Wilfried Galimo

== Achievements ==
- French Guiana Championnat National: 7

2002–03, 2005–06, 2010–11, 2011–12, 2013–14, 2015–16, 2016-17.

- Coupe de Guyane: 6

2004–05, 2010–11, 2011–12, 2012–13, 2014–15, 2015–16.

- Coupe des Guyanes de football: 1

2011.

== The club in the French football structure ==
- Coupe de France: 6 appearances

1998–99, 2001–02, 2003–04, 2005–06, 2013–14, 2014–15

- Tie won:

2014–15 CMS Oissel 1–1 US Mataury (aet, 2–4 pens) (round 7)
