= ASC Le Geldar =

- Full name: Association Sportive et Culturelle Le Geldar de Kourou
- Founded: 1957
- Ground: Stade Bois Chaudat, Kourou, French Guiana
- Capacity: 4,000
- Chairman: Daniel Thalmensy
- Manager: Marie Rose Careme
- League: French Guiana Championnat National
- 2024–25: 4th
- Website: https://asc-le-geldar.footeo.com/
Home colours	Away colours

Association Sportive et Culturelle Le Geldar is a football club of French Guiana, playing in the town of Kourou. They play in the French Guianese first division, the French Guiana Championnat National. ASC Le Geldar usually play their home games in front of dozens of spectators at the 4,000-capacity Stade Bois Chaudat.

== Achievements ==
- French Guiana Championnat National: 10

1985, 1988, 1989, 2001, 2004, 2005, 2008, 2009, 2010, 2013

- Outremer Champions Cup: 1

2005

- Coupe D.O.M: 1

2005

- Coupe de Guyane: 4

1978–79, 2006–07, 2008–09, 2009–10

- Coupe de la Municipalité de Kourou: 1

1982/83

- Coupe des Guyanes: 1

2008

== Performance in CONCACAF competitions ==
- CONCACAF Champions' Cup: 1 appearance

1992 – 1st Round (Caribbean) – Lost against (Suriname) SV Robinhood 2 – 1 on aggregate (stage 2 of 6)

== The club in the French football structure ==
- French Cup: 7 appearances

1983–84, 1988–89, 2002–03, 2010–2011, 2012–13, 2016–17, 2017–18

Ties won
Year	Round	Home team (tier)	Score	Away team (tier)
1988–89	Round 8	ASC Le Geldar	1–1 (a.e.t.) (5–4 p)	EAC Chaumont (3)
1988–89	Round 9	FC Sens (5)	1–2	ASC Le Geldar

== Presidents ==
- (France) Eustase Rimane (1957–60)
- (France) Etienne Antoinette (1960–76)
- (France) Gabriel Deloumeau (1976–80)
- (France) Firmin Zulemaro (1980–81)
- (France) Daniel Talmensy (1981–83)
- (France) Jacques Voyer (1983–86)
- (France) Eutase Rimane (1986–89)
- (France) Daniel Thalmensy (1989–)
