= CSC de Cayenne =

French Guianese association football club

- Full name: Club Sportif et Culturel de Cayenne
- Ground: Stade de Baduel, Route de Baduel, 97300, Cayenne
- Capacity: 7,500
- President: Jean Laquitaine
- Manager: Romain Salvatièrre
- League: French Guiana Championnat Régional
- 2024–25: 9th
| Home colours | Away colours |

Club Sportif et Culturel de Cayenne (CSC de Cayenne) is a French Guianese football team based in the region's capital Cayenne that plays in the French Guiana Championnat National.
