= 2020 in association football =

The following are the scheduled events of association football for the year 2020 throughout the world.

Numerous association football competitions were either postponed or cancelled during the year due to the COVID-19 pandemic. On 13 March 2020, FIFA announced that clubs did not have to release players to their national teams during the international windows of March and April 2020, while players also had the option to decline a call-up without any consequences. FIFA also recommended that all international matches during the March and April 2020 windows be postponed.

By April 2020 only four nations were still playing association football league matches: Belarus, Nicaragua, Tajikistan, and Turkmenistan

In April 2020, FIFA announced that the 2020 FIFA U-20 Women's World Cup and the 2020 FIFA U-17 Women's World Cup would be postponed and rescheduled.

== Events ==
=== Men's youth ===
- 8–26 January: 2020 AFC U-23 Championship in Thailand
  - (gold) : South Korea
  - (silver) : Saudi Arabia
  - (bronze) : Australia
  - 4th: Uzbekistan
- 17 February – 5 March: 2020 Arab Cup U-20 in Saudi Arabia
  - (gold) : Senegal
  - (silver) : Tunisia
- 19–29 November: 2020 COSAFA Under-17 Championship in South Africa
  - (gold) : South Africa
  - (silver) : Zambia
  - (bronze) : Angola
  - 4th: Malawi
- 20–29 November: 2020 WAFU U-20 Tournament in Senegal
  - (gold) : Gambia
  - (silver) : Senegal
- 22 November – 2 December: 2020 CECAFA U-20 Championship in Tanzania
  - (gold) : Uganda
  - (silver) : Tanzania
  - (bronze) : South Sudan
  - 4th: Kenya
- 3–13 December: 2020 COSAFA U-20 Cup in South Africa
  - (gold) : Mozambique
  - (silver) : Namibia
  - (bronze) : Angola
  - 4th: Zambia
- 13–28 December: 2020 UNAF U-20 Tournament in Tunisia
  - (gold) : Morocco
  - (gold) : Tunisia
  - (bronze) : Libya
- 15–23 December: 2020 UNIFFAC U-20 Championship in Equatorial Guinea

=== Women's national teams ===
- 4–10 March: 2020 Turkish Women's Cup in Turkey
  - (gold) : Chile
  - (silver) : Hungary
  - (bronze) : Ghana
  - 4th: Romania
- 4–11 March: 2020 Algarve Cup in Portugal
  - (gold) : Germany
  - (silver) : Italy
  - (bronze) : Norway
  - 4th: New Zealand

==== CAF ====
- 3–14 November: 2020 COSAFA Women's Championship in South Africa
  - (gold) : South Africa
  - (silver) : Botswana

=== Women's youth ===
- 22 February – 8 March: 2020 CONCACAF Women's U-20 Championship in Dominican Republic
  - (gold) : United States
  - (silver) : Mexico
- 4–14 November: 2020 COSAFA U-17 Women's Championship in South Africa
  - (gold) : Tanzania
  - (silver) : Zambia

=== Men's clubs ===
==== UEFA ====
- 17 September 2019 – 25 August 2020: 2019–20 UEFA Youth League (final in (Switzerland) Nyon)
  - (gold) : (Spain) Real Madrid
  - (silver) : (Portugal) Benfica

== News ==
- 29 January – In each team's opening match of CONCACAF Olympic qualifying, Christine Sinclair scored two goals in Canada's 11–0 win over Saint Kitts and Nevis. Her second goal was the 185th of her international career, giving her sole possession of the record for international goals (for either men or women) previously held by the USA's Abby Wambach.
- 13 March – FIFA announced that clubs did not have to release players to their national teams during the international windows of March and April 2020 due to the COVID-19 pandemic, players also had the option to decline a call-up without any consequences.
- 3 April – FIFA announces that the 2020 FIFA U-20 Women's World Cup, scheduled to be held in Panama and Costa Rica in August, and the 2020 FIFA U-17 Women's World Cup, scheduled to be held in India in November, would be postponed and rescheduled.
- 20 April – Due to the COVID-19 pandemic, only four top-tier football leagues were actively playing as of this date: 2020 Ýokary Liga, 2020 Tajikistan Higher League, Belarusian Premier League and Liga Primera de Nicaragua.

== Club continental champions ==
=== Men ===
Region	Tournament	Defending champion	Champion	Title	Last honour
AFC (Asia)	2020 AFC Champions League	(Saudi Arabia) Al-Hilal	(South Korea) Ulsan Hyundai	2nd	2012
AFC (Asia)	2020 AFC Cup	(Lebanon) Al-Ahed	Season Cancelled, due to the COVID-19 pandemic		
CAF (Africa)	2019–20 CAF Champions League	(Tunisia) Espérance de Tunis	(Egypt) Al Ahly	9th	2013
CAF (Africa)	2019–20 CAF Confederation Cup	(Egypt) Zamalek	(Morocco) RS Berkane	1st	—
CAF (Africa)	2020 CAF Super Cup (February)	(Morocco) Raja Casablanca	(Egypt) Zamalek	4th	2003
CONCACAF (North and Central America, Caribbean)	2020 CONCACAF Champions League	(Mexico) Monterrey	(Mexico) UANL	1st	—
CONCACAF (North and Central America, Caribbean)	2020 CONCACAF League	(Costa Rica) Saprissa	(Costa Rica) Alajuelense	1st	—
CONCACAF (North and Central America, Caribbean)	2020 CFU Club Championship	(Jamaica) Portmore United	Season Cancelled, due to the COVID-19 pandemic		
CONCACAF (North and Central America, Caribbean)	2020 Caribbean Club Shield	(Suriname) Robinhood	Season Cancelled, due to the COVID-19 pandemic		
CONCACAF (North and Central America, Caribbean)	2020 Copa Premier Centroamericana	(Honduras) Real España	Season Cancelled, due to the COVID-19 pandemic		
CONMEBOL (South America)	2020 Copa Libertadores	(Brazil) Flamengo	(Brazil) Palmeiras	2nd	1999
CONMEBOL (South America)	2020 Copa Sudamericana	(Ecuador) Independiente del Valle	(Argentina) Defensa y Justicia	1st	—
CONMEBOL (South America)	2020 Recopa Sudamericana	(Argentina) River Plate	(Brazil) Flamengo	1st	—
OFC (Oceania)	2020 OFC Champions League	(New Caledonia) Hienghène Sport	Season Cancelled, due to the COVID-19 pandemic		
UEFA (Europe)	2019–20 UEFA Champions League	(England) Liverpool	(Germany) Bayern Munich	6th	2012–13
UEFA (Europe)	2019–20 UEFA Europa League	(England) Chelsea	(Spain) Sevilla	6th	2015–16
UEFA (Europe)	2020 UEFA Super Cup	(England) Liverpool	(Germany) Bayern Munich	2nd	2013
UAFA (Arab States)	2019–20 Arab Club Champions Cup	(Tunisia) Étoile du Sahel	(Morocco) Raja Casablanca	2nd	2005–06
FIFA (Global)	2020 FIFA Club World Cup	(England) Liverpool	(Germany) Bayern Munich	2nd	2013

=== Women ===
Region	Tournament	Defending champion	Champion	Title	Last honour
AFC (Asia)	2020 AFC Women's Club Championship	(Japan) Nippon TV Beleza	Season Cancelled, due to the COVID-19 pandemic		
CONCACAF(North and Central America, Caribbean)	2020 UNCAF Women's Interclub Championship	(Costa Rica) Saprissa	Season Cancelled, due to the COVID-19 pandemic		
CONMEBOL (South America)	2020 Copa Libertadores Femenina	(Brazil) Corinthians	(Brazil) Ferroviária	2nd	2015
UEFA (Europe)	2019–20 UEFA Women's Champions League	(France) Lyon	(France) Lyon	7th	2018–19

== National leagues ==
=== UEFA ===
Nation	Tournament	Champion	Second place	Title	Last honour
Albania	2019–20 Kategoria Superiore	Tirana	Kukësi	25th	2008–09
Andorra	2019–20 Primera Divisió	Inter Club d'Escaldes	Santa Coloma	1st	–
Armenia	2019–20 Armenian Premier League	Ararat-Armenia	Noah	2nd	2018–19
Austria	2019–20 Austrian Football Bundesliga	Red Bull Salzburg	Rapid Wien	14th	2018–19
Azerbaijan	2019–20 Azerbaijan Premier League	Qarabağ	Neftçi Baku	8th	2018–19
Belarus	2020 Belarusian Premier League	Shakhtyor Soligorsk	BATE Borisov	2nd	2005
Belgium	2019–20 Belgian First Division A	Club Brugge	Gent	16th	2017–18
Bosnia and Herzegovina	2019–20 Premier League of Bosnia and Herzegovina	Sarajevo	Željezničar	5th	2018–19
Bulgaria	2019–20 First Professional Football League	Ludogorets Razgrad	CSKA Sofia	9th	2018–19
(Autonomous Republic of Crimea) Crimea	2019–20 Crimean Premier League	Yevpatoriya	Krymteplitsa	2nd	2017–18
Croatia	2019–20 Croatian First Football League	Dinamo Zagreb	Lokomotiva	21st	2018–19
Cyprus	2019–20 Cypriot First Division	Season abandoned on 15 May 2020, due to the COVID-19 pandemic			
Czech Republic	2019–20 Czech First League	Slavia Prague	Viktoria Plzeň	19th	2018–19
Denmark	2019–20 Danish Superliga	Midtjylland	Copenhagen	3rd	2017–18
England	2019–20 Premier League	Liverpool	Manchester City	19th	1989–90
Estonia	2020 Meistriliiga	Flora	Paide Linnameeskond	13th	2019
Faroe Islands	2020 Effodeildin	Havnar Bóltfelag	NSÍ Runavík	24th	2018
Finland	2020 Veikkausliiga	HJK	FC Inter Turku	30th	2018
France	2019–20 Ligue 1	Paris Saint-Germain	Marseille	9th	2018–19
(Georgia (country)) Georgia	2020 Erovnuli Liga	Dinamo Tbilisi	Dinamo Batumi	18th	2019
Germany	2019–20 Bundesliga	Bayern Munich	Borussia Dortmund	30th	2018–19
Gibraltar	2019–20 Gibraltar National League	Season abandoned on 7 May 2020, due to the COVID-19 pandemic			
Greece	2019–20 Super League Greece	Olympiacos	PAOK	45th	2016–17
Hungary	2019–20 Nemzeti Bajnokság I	Ferencváros	Fehérvár	31st	2018–19
Iceland	2020 Úrvalsdeild	Valur	FH	23rd	2018
(Republic of Ireland) Ireland	2020 League of Ireland Premier Division	Shamrock Rovers	Bohemian	18th	2011
Israel	2019–20 Israeli Premier League	Maccabi Tel Aviv	Maccabi Haifa	24th	2018–19
Italy	2019–20 Serie A	Juventus	Internazionale	36th	2018–19
Kazakhstan	2020 Kazakhstan Premier League	Kairat	Tobol	3rd	2004
Kosovo	2019–20 Football Superleague of Kosovo	Drita	Gjilani	3rd	2017–18
Latvia	2020 Latvian Higher League	Riga	Rīgas	3rd	2019
Lithuania	2020 A Lyga	Žalgiris	Sūduva	8th	2016
Luxembourg	2019–20 Luxembourg National Division	Season abandoned on 28 April 2020, due to the COVID-19 pandemic			
Malta	2019–20 Maltese Premier League	Floriana	Valletta	26th	1992–93
Montenegro	2019–20 Montenegrin First League	Budućnost	Sutjeska	4th	2016–17
Netherlands	2019–20 Eredivisie	Season abandoned on 24 April 2020, due to the COVID-19 pandemic			
North Macedonia	2019–20 Macedonian First Football League	Vardar	Sileks	11th	2016–17
Northern Ireland	2019–20 NIFL Premiership	Linfield	Coleraine	54th	2018–19
Norway	2020 Eliteserien	Bodø/Glimt	Molde	1st	–
Poland	2019–20 Ekstraklasa	Legia Warsaw	Lech Poznań	14th	2017–18
Portugal	2019–20 Primeira Liga	Porto	Benfica	29th	2017–18
Romania	2019–20 Liga I	CFR Cluj	Universitatea Craiova	6th	2018–19
Russia	2019–20 Russian Premier League	Zenit Saint Petersburg	Lokomotiv Moscow	7th	2018–19
San Marino	2019–20 Campionato Sammarinese di Calcio	Tre Fiori	Folgore	8th	2010–11
Scotland	2019–20 Scottish Premiership	Celtic	Rangers	51st	2018–19
Serbia	2019–20 Serbian SuperLiga	Red Star Belgrade	Partizan	31st	2018–19
Slovakia	2019–20 Slovak First Football League	Slovan Bratislava	Žilina	10th	2018–19
Slovenia	2019–20 Slovenian PrvaLiga	Celje	Maribor	1st	—
Spain	2019–20 La Liga	Real Madrid	Barcelona	34th	2016–17
Sweden	2020 Allsvenskan	Malmö FF	IF Elfsborg	24th	2017
Switzerland	2019–20 Swiss Super League	Young Boys	St. Gallen	14th	2018–19
Turkey	2019–20 Süper Lig	İstanbul Başakşehir	Trabzonspor	1st	—
Ukraine	2019–20 Ukrainian Premier League	Shakhtar Donetsk	Dynamo Kyiv	13th	2018–19
Wales	2019–20 Cymru Premier	Connah's Quay Nomads	The New Saints	1st	—

=== AFC ===
Nation	Tournament	Champion	Second place	Title	Last honour
Afghanistan	2020 Afghan Premier League	Shaheen Asmayee	Simorgh Alborz	5th	2017
Australia	2019–20 A-League	Sydney FC	Melbourne City	5th	2018–19
Bahrain	2019–20 Bahraini Premier League	Al-Hidd	Al-Muharraq	2nd	2015–16
Bangladesh	2019–20 Bangladesh Premier League	Season abandoned on 17 May 2020, due to the COVID-19 pandemic			
Bhutan	2020 Bhutan Premier League	Thimphu City	Ugyen Academy	2nd	2016
Brunei	2020 Brunei Super League	Season abandoned on 19 September 2020, due to the COVID-19 pandemic			
Cambodia	2020 C-League	Boeung Ket	Svay Rieng	4th	2017
China	2020 Chinese Super League	Jiangsu Suning	Guangzhou Evergrande	1st	—
Chinese Taipei	2020 Taiwan Football Premier League	Taiwan Steel	Taipower	1st	—
(Timor-Leste) East Timor	2020 Liga Futebol Amadora	Cancelled and not organised due to the COVID-19 pandemic			
Guam	2019–20 Guam Soccer League	Season abandoned on 10 September 2020, due to the COVID-19 pandemic			
Hong Kong	2019–20 Hong Kong Premier League	Kitchee	Eastern	10th	2017–18
India	2019–20 I-League	Mohun Bagan	East Bengal	5th	2014–15
India	2019–20 Indian Super League	ATK	Chennaiyin	3rd	2016
Iran	2019–20 Persian Gulf Pro League	Persepolis	Esteghlal	13th	2018–19
Iraq	2019–20 Iraqi Premier League	Season abandoned on 3 June 2020, due to the COVID-19 pandemic			
Japan	2020 J1 League	Kawasaki Frontale	Gamba Osaka	3rd	2018
Jordan	2020 Jordanian Pro League	Al-Wehdat	Al-Jazeera	17th	2017–18
Kuwait	2019–20 Kuwaiti Premier League	Al-Kuwait	Al-Qadsia	16th	2018–19
Kyrgyzstan	2020 Kyrgyz Premier League	Dordoi Bishkek	Alga Bishkek	12th	2019
Laos	2020 Lao Premier League	Lao Toyota	Master 7	5th	2019
Lebanon	2019–20 Lebanese Football League	Season abandoned on 28 May 2020, due to the COVID-19 pandemic			
Macau	2020 Liga de Elite	Benfica de Macau	Chao Pak Kei	6th	2018
Malaysia	2020 Malaysia Super League	Johor Darul Ta'zim	Kedah	7th	2019
Maldives	2020 Dhivehi Premier League	Maziya	Eagles	2nd	2016
Mongolia	2020 Mongolian National Premier League	Athletic 220	Ulaanbaatar	1st	—
Myanmar	2020 Myanmar National League	Shan United	Hantharwady United	3rd	2019
Nepal	2019–20 Martyr's Memorial A-Division League	Machhindra	Nepal Army Club	1st	—
North Korea	2019–20 DPR Korea Premier Football League	Season abandoned, due to the COVID-19 pandemic			
Northern Mariana Islands	2020 M*League Division 1 (Spring)	Season abandoned, due to the COVID-19 pandemic			
Northern Mariana Islands	2020 M*League Division 1 (Fall)	Season abandoned, due to the COVID-19 pandemic			
Oman	2019–20 Oman Professional League	Al-Seeb	Dhofar	1st	—
Pakistan	2019–20 Pakistan Premier League	Season abandoned, due to the COVID-19 pandemic			
Palestine	2019–20 West Bank Premier League	Markaz Balata	Markaz Shabab Al-Am'ari	1st	—
Palestine	2020 Gaza Strip Premier League	Khadamat Rafah	Khadamat Al Shataa	5th	2018–19
Philippines	2020 Philippines Football League	United City	Kaya–Iloilo	5th	2019
Qatar	2019–20 Qatar Stars League	Al-Duhail	Al-Rayyan	7th	2017–18
Saudi Arabia	2019–20 Saudi Professional League	Al-Hilal	Al-Nassr	16th	2017–18
Singapore	2020 Singapore Premier League	Albirex Niigata (S)	Tampines Rovers	4th	2018
South Korea	2020 K League 1	Jeonbuk Hyundai Motors	Ulsan Hyundai	8th	2019
Sri Lanka	2019–20 Sri Lanka Champions League	Season abandoned, due to the COVID-19 pandemic			
Syria	2019–20 Syrian Premier League	Tishreen	Al-Wathba	3rd	1996–97
Tajikistan	2020 Tajikistan Higher League	Istiklol	Khujand	9th	2019
Turkmenistan	2020 Ýokary Liga	Altyn Asyr	Ahal	7th	2019
United Arab Emirates	2019–20 UAE Pro-League	Season abandoned on 18 June 2020, due to the COVID-19 pandemic			
Uzbekistan	2020 Uzbekistan Super League	Pakhtakor Tashkent	Nasaf	13th	2019
Vietnam	2020 V.League 1	Viettel	Hanoi	1st	-
Yemen	2020 YFA Tournament	Al-Sha'ab Hadramaut	Wahda Aden	1st	-

=== CAF ===
Nation	Tournament	Champion	Second place	Title	Last honour
Algeria	2019–20 Algerian Ligue Professionnelle 1	CR Belouizdad	MC Alger	7th	2000–01
Angola	2019–20 Girabola	Season abandoned on 30 April 2020, due to the COVID-19 pandemic			
Benin	2019–20 Benin Premier League	Season abandoned on 1 July 2020, due to the COVID-19 pandemic			
Botswana	2019–20 Botswana Premier League	Jwaneng Galaxy	Township Rollers	1st	—
Burkina Faso	2019–20 Burkinabé Premier League	Season abandoned on 4 May 2020, due to the COVID-19 pandemic			
Burundi	2019–20 Burundi Premier League	Le Messager Ngozi	Musongati	2nd	2017–18
Cameroon	2019–20 Elite One	PWD Bamenda	Coton Sport	1st	—
Cape Verde	2020 Cape Verdean Football Championships	Season abandoned on 8 May 2020, due to the COVID-19 pandemic			
Central African Republic	2019–20 Central African Republic League	Season abandoned on 2 June 2020, due to the COVID-19 pandemic			
Chad	2020 Chad Premier League	Gazelle	Renaissance	4th	2015
Comoros	2020 Comoros Premier League	US Zilimadjou	Fomboni	3rd	1997–98
(Republic of the Congo) Congo	2019–20 Ligue 1	AS Otohô	Diables Noirs	3rd	2018–19
(Democratic Republic of the Congo) DR Congo	2019–20 Linafoot	TP Mazembe	AS Vita Club	18th	2018–19
Djibouti	2019–20 Djibouti Premier League	GR/SIAF	AS Port	1st	—
Egypt	2019–20 Egyptian Premier League	Al-Ahly	Zamalek	42nd	2018–19
Equatorial Guinea	2019–20 Equatoguinean Primera División	Season abandoned on 8 June 2020, due to the COVID-19 pandemic			
Eritrea	2020 Eritrean Premier League				
Eswatini	2019–20 Premier League of Eswatini	Young Buffaloes	Mbabane Swallows	2nd	2009–10
Ethiopia	2019–20 Ethiopian Premier League	Season abandoned on 5 May 2020, due to the COVID-19 pandemic			
Gabon	2019–20 Gabon Championnat National D1	Season abandoned on 10 July 2020, due to the COVID-19 pandemic			
(The Gambia) Gambia	2019–20 GFA League First Division	Season abandoned on 21 May 2020, due to the COVID-19 pandemic			
Ghana	2019–20 Ghana Premier League	Season abandoned on 1 July 2020, due to the COVID-19 pandemic			
Guinea	2019–20 Guinée Championnat National	Season abandoned on 30 April 2020, due to the COVID-19 pandemic			
Guinea-Bissau	2019–20 Campeonato Nacional da Guiné-Bissau	Season abandoned, due to the COVID-19 pandemic			
Ivory Coast	2019–20 Ligue 1	Racing Club Abidjan	FC San Pédro	1st	—
Kenya	2019–20 Kenyan Premier League	Gor Mahia	Tusker	19th	2018–19
Lesotho	2019–20 Lesotho Premier League	Bantu	Matlama	4th	2017–18
Liberia	2020 Liberian First Division League	Season abandoned on 5 May 2020, due to the COVID-19 pandemic			
Madagascar	2019–20 Malagasy Pro League	Season abandoned on 15 August 2020, due to the COVID-19 pandemic			
Mali	2019–20 Malian Première Division	Stade Malien	Yeelen Olympique	19th	2016
Mauritania	2019–20 Ligue 1 Mauritania	FC Nouadhibou	FC Tevragh-Zeina	8th	2018–19
Mauritius	2019–20 Mauritian Premier League	Season abandoned on 6 April 2020, due to the COVID-19 pandemic			
Morocco	2019–20 Botola	Raja Casablanca	Wydad Casablanca	12th	2012–13
Mozambique	2020 Moçambola	Season cancelled, due to the COVID-19 pandemic			
Niger	2019–20 Niger Premier League	Season abandoned on 4 May 2020, due to the COVID-19 pandemic			
Nigeria	2019–20 Nigeria Professional Football League	Season abandoned on 10 July 2020, due to the COVID-19 pandemic			
Réunion	2020 Réunion Premier League	Season abandoned, due to the COVID-19 pandemic			
Rwanda	2019–20 Rwanda Premier League	APR	Rayon Sports	18th	2017–18
Senegal	2019–20 Senegal Premier League	Season abandoned on 8 July 2020, due to the COVID-19 pandemic			
Seychelles	2019–20 Seychelles First Division	Foresters	Côte d'Or	1st	—
Sierra Leone	2019–20 Sierra Leone National Premier League	Season abandoned on 15 July 2020, due to the COVID-19 pandemic			
Somalia	2019–20 Somali First Division	Mogadishu City	Dekedaha	7th	2015–16
South Africa	2019–20 South African Premier Division	Mamelodi Sundowns	Kaizer Chiefs	10th	2018–19
South Sudan	2020 South Sudan Football Championship	Season abandoned on 21 May 2020, due to the COVID-19 pandemic			
Sudan	2019–20 Sudan Premier League	Al Merrikh	Al Hilal	21st	2018–19
Tanzania	2019–20 Tanzanian Premier League	Simba	Young Africans	20th	2018–19
Togo	2019–20 Togolese Championnat National	ASKO Kara	Unisport	5th	2006–07
Tunisia	2019–20 Tunisian Ligue Professionnelle 1	Espérance de Tunis	CS Sfaxien	30th	2018–19
Uganda	2019–20 Uganda Premier League	Vipers	KCCA	4th	2017–18
Zambia	2019–20 Zambian Super League	Nkana	Forest Rangers	13th	2013
Zanzibar	2019–20 Zanzibar Premier League	Mlandege	Zimamoto	7th	2002

=== CONCACAF ===
Nation	Tournament	Champion	Second place	Title	Last honour
Anguilla	2020 AFA Senior Male League	Roaring Lions	Doc's United	8th	2016–17
Antigua and Barbuda	2019–20 Antigua and Barbuda Premier Division	Season abandoned, due to the COVID-19 pandemic			
Aruba	2019–20 Aruban Division di Honor	Season abandoned on 17 June 2020, due to the COVID-19 pandemic			
Barbados	2019–20 Barbados Premier League	Season abandoned, due to the COVID-19 pandemic			
(The Bahamas) Bahamas	2019–20 BFA Senior League	Season abandoned, due to the COVID-19 pandemic			
Belize	2020 Premier League of Belize Closing	Season abandoned on 18 April 2020, due to the COVID-19 pandemic			
Belize	2020 Premier League of Belize Opening	Verdes	Belmopan Bandits	2nd	2007–08
Bermuda	2019–20 Bermudian Premier Division	North Village Rams	Dandy Town Hornets	9th	2010–11
British Virgin Islands	2019–20 BVIFA National Football League	Islanders	Wolues	7th	2016–17
Bonaire	2019–20 Bonaire League	Season abandoned, due to the COVID-19 pandemic			
Canada	2020 Canadian Premier League	Forge FC	HFX Wanderers FC	2nd	2019
Cayman Islands	2019–20 Cayman Islands Premier League	Bodden Town	Scholars International	4th	2016–17
Costa Rica	2019–20 Liga FPD–Clausura	Saprissa	Alajuelense	35th	2018 Clausura
Costa Rica	2019–20 Liga FPD–Apertura	Herediano	Alajuelense	28th	2018 Apertura
Cuba	2019–20 Campeonato Nacional de Fútbol de Cuba	Season abandoned on 23 June 2020, due to the COVID-19 pandemic			
Curaçao	2019–20 Curaçao Promé Divishon	Scherpenheuvel	Vesta	3rd	1968–69
Dominica	2019–20 Dominica Premier League	South East	Bath Estate	3rd	2019
Dominican Republic	2020 Liga Dominicana de Fútbol	Universidad O&M	Atlántico	1st	—
El Salvador	2019–20 Primera División de El Salvador	Season abandoned on 29 April 2020, due to the COVID-19 pandemic			
French Guiana	2019–20 French Guiana Honor Division	CSC de Cayenne	ASC Le Geldar	1st	—
Grenada	2019–20 GFA Premier League (Note: The GFA Premier League was cancelled due to a judicial process. Instead, a club championship under a different format was played.)	Hurricanes SC	Fontenoy United	6th	2017–18
Guadeloupe	2019–20 Guadeloupe Division of Honor	AS Gosier	Jeunesse Évolution	2nd	2004–05
Guatemala	2020 Clausura	Season abandoned on 21 May 2020, due to the COVID-19 pandemic			
Guatemala	2019 Apertura	Municipal	Antigua	31st	2017 Clausura
Guyana	2020 GFF Elite League	Season not played due to the political situation following the 2020 Guyanese general election			
Haiti	2020 Ligue Haïtienne	Season abandoned on 2 July 2020, due to the COVID-19 pandemic			
Honduras	2020 Clausura	Season abandoned on 29 April 2020, due to the COVID-19 pandemic			
Honduras	2019 Apertura	C.D. Olimpia	C.D. Marathón	31st	2016 Clausura
Jamaica	2019–20 National Premier League	Season abandoned on 29 April 2020, due to the COVID-19 pandemic			
Martinique	2019–20 Martinique Championnat National	AS Samaritaine	Essor-Préchotain	3rd	1980–81
Mexico	2019 Liga MX Apertura	Monterrey	León	5th	2010 Apertura
Mexico	2020 Liga MX Clausura	Season abandoned on 22 May 2020, due to the COVID-19 pandemic			
Nicaragua	2020 Clausura	Real Estelí	Managua	18th	2019 Apertura
Nicaragua	2019 Apertura	Real Estelí	Managua	17th	2019 Clausura
Panama	2020 Apertura	Season abandoned on 17 March 2020, due to the COVID-19 pandemic			
Panama	2020 Clausura	C.A.I.	San Francisco	3rd	2019 Clausura
Puerto Rico	2019–20 Liga Puerto Rico	Season abandoned, due to the COVID-19 pandemic			
Saint Kitts and Nevis	2019–20 SKNFA Premier League	St. Paul's United	Village Superstars	5th	2014–15
Saint Kitts and Nevis	2019–20 N1 League	Youths of the Future	All Ballerz	1st	—
Saint Lucia	2020 SLFA First Division	Season abandoned, due to the COVID-19 pandemic			
Saint Vincent and the Grenadines	2019–20 SVGFF Premier Division	Hope International	Predators	4th	2014–15
Suriname	2019–20 SVB Topklasse	Season abandoned on 15 May 2020, due to the COVID-19 pandemic			
Trinidad and Tobago	2020 TT Pro League	Defence Force	La Horquetta Rangers	4th	2012–13
Turks and Caicos Islands	2020 Provo Premier League	Season abandoned, due to the COVID-19 pandemic			
(United States Virgin Islands) U.S. Virgin Islands	2019–20 U.S. Virgin Islands Premier League	Season abandoned, due to the COVID-19 pandemic			
United States	2020 Major League Soccer season	Columbus Crew	Seattle Sounders FC	2nd	2008

=== CONMEBOL ===
Nation	Tournament	Champion	Second place	Title	Last honour
Argentina	2019–20 Argentine Primera División	Boca Juniors	River Plate	34th	2017–18
Bolivia	2020 Bolivian Primera División Apertura	Always Ready	The Strongest	3rd	1957
Bolivia	2020 Bolivian Primera División Clausura	Tournament cancelled due to the COVID-19 pandemic			
Brazil	2020 Campeonato Brasileiro Série A	Flamengo	Internacional	7th	2019
Chile	2020 Chilean Primera División	Universidad Católica	Unión La Calera	15th	2019
Colombia	2020 Categoría Primera A	América de Cali	Santa Fe	15th	2019 Finalización
Ecuador	2020 Ecuadorian Serie A	Barcelona	LDU Quito	16th	2016
Paraguay	2020 Paraguayan Primera División Apertura	Cerro Porteño	Olimpia	33rd	2017 Clausura
Paraguay	2020 Paraguayan Primera División Clausura	Olimpia	Guaraní	45th	2019 Clausura
Peru	2020 Peruvian Liga 1	Sporting Cristal	Universitario	20th	2018
Uruguay	2020 Uruguayan Primera División	Nacional	Rentistas	49th	2019
Venezuela	2020 Venezuelan Primera División	Deportivo La Guaira	Deportivo Táchira	1st	—

=== OFC ===
Nation	Tournament	Champion	Second place	Title	Last honour
Cook Islands	2020 Cook Islands Round Cup	Tupapa	Nikao	16th	2019
Fiji	2020 Fiji Premier League	Suva	Rewa	4th	2014
Kiribati	2020 Kiribati National Championship				
New Zealand	2019–20 New Zealand Football Championship	Auckland City	Team Wellington	7th	2017–18
Papua New Guinea	2019–20 Papua New Guinea National Soccer League	Lae City	Vitiaz United	6th	2019
American Samoa	2020 FFAS Senior League				
Samoa	2020 Samoa National League	Lupe o le Soaga	Vaipuna	6th	2019
Solomon Islands	2019–20 Solomon Islands S-League	Solomon Warriors	Henderson Eels	5th	2018
(French Polynesia) Tahiti	2019–20 Tahiti Ligue 1	Pirae	Venus	1st	—
Tuvalu	2020 Tuvalu A-Division	Nauti	Tofaga	23rd	2019
Vanuatu	2020 VFF National Super League	Malampa Revivors	Vaum United	3rd	2019
Vanuatu	2019–20 Port Vila Premier League	Ifira Black Bird	Galaxy	1st	—

=== Non-FIFA ===
Nation	League	Champion	Second place	Title	Last honour
Gozo	2019–20 Gozo Football League First Division	Nadur Youngsters	Xewkija Tigers	11th	2013
Greenland	2020 Greenlandic Football Championship	Tournament cancelled due to the COVID-19 pandemic			
Mayotte	2020 Mayotte Division Honneur				
Northern Cyprus	2019–20 KTFF Süper Lig	Mağusa Türk Gücü	Merit Alsancak Yeşilova	10th	2018/19
Saint Pierre and Miquelon	2020 Ligue de Football de Saint Pierre et Miquelon	AS Miquelonnaise	AS Saint-Pierre	1st	—
Vatican City	2020 Vatican City Championship	Season abandoned due to the COVID-19 pandemic			

== Domestic cups ==
=== UEFA ===
Nation	Tournament	Champion	Final score	Second place	Title	Last honor
Albania	2019–20 Albanian Cup	Teuta	2–0	Tirana	4th	2004–05
Albania	2020 Albanian Supercup	Teuta	2–1	Tirana	1st	—
Andorra	2020 Copa Constitució	Inter Club d'Escaldes	2–0	Santa Coloma	1st	—
Andorra	2020 Andorran Supercup	Inter Club d'Escaldes	2–0	Santa Coloma	1st	—
Armenia	2019–20 Armenian Cup	Noah	5–5 (a.e.t.) (7–6 p)	Ararat-Armenia	1st	—
Armenia	2020 Armenian Supercup	Noah	2–1 (a.e.t.)	Ararat-Armenia	1st	—
Austria	2019–20 Austrian Cup	Red Bull Salzburg	5–0	SC Austria Lustenau	7th	2018–19
Azerbaijan	2019–20 Azerbaijan Cup	Tournament abandoned due to the COVID-19 pandemic				
Belarus	2019–20 Belarusian Cup	BATE Borisov	1–0 (a.e.t.)	Dinamo Brest	4th	2014–15
Belarus	2020 Belarusian Super Cup	Dynamo Brest	2–0	Shakhtyor Soligorsk	3rd	2019
Belgium	2019–20 Belgian Cup	Antwerp	1–0	Club Brugge	3rd	1991–92
Belgium	2020 Belgian Super Cup	Tournament abandoned due to the COVID-19 pandemic				
Bosnia and Herzegovina	2019–20 Bosnia and Herzegovina Cup	Tournament abandoned due to the COVID-19 pandemic				
Bulgaria	2019–20 Bulgarian Cup	Lokomotiv Plovdiv	0–0 (a.e.t.) (5–3 p)	CSKA Sofia	2nd	2018–19
Bulgaria	2020 Bulgarian Supercup	Lokomotiv Plovdiv	1–0	Ludogorets Razgrad	1st	—
Croatia	2019–20 Croatian Football Cup	Rijeka	1–0	Lokomotiva	6th	2018–19
Cyprus	2019–20 Cypriot Cup	Tournament abandoned due to the COVID-19 pandemic				
Cyprus	2020 Cypriot Super Cup	Tournament abandoned due to the COVID-19 pandemic				
Czech Republic	2019–20 Czech Cup	Sparta Prague	2–1	Slovan Liberec	15th	2013–14
Czech Republic	2020 Czechoslovak Supercup	Sparta Prague	Not Played	Slovan Bratislava	1st	—
Denmark	2019–20 Danish Cup	SønderjyskE	2–0	AaB	1st	—
England	2019–20 FA Cup	Arsenal	2–1	Chelsea	14th	2016–17
England	2019–20 EFL Cup	Manchester City	2–1	Aston Villa	6th	2018–19
England	2020 FA Community Shield	Arsenal	1–1 (5–4 p)	Liverpool	20th	2017
Estonia	2019–20 Estonian Cup	Flora	2–1	Narva Trans	8th	2015–16
Estonia	2020 Estonian Supercup	Flora	2–0	Narva Trans	10th	2016
Faroe Islands	2020 Faroe Islands Cup	HB Tórshavn	2–0	Víkingur Gøta	28th	2019
Faroe Islands	2020 Faroe Islands Super Cup	KÍ Klaksvík	1–1 (5–4 p)	HB Tórshavn	1st	–
Finland	2020 Finnish Cup	HJK Helsinki	2–0	Inter Turku	14th	2016–17
France	2019–20 Coupe de France	Paris Saint-Germain	1–0	Saint-Étienne	13th	2017–18
France	2019–20 Coupe de la Ligue	Paris Saint-Germain	0–0 (a.e.t.) (6–5 p)	Lyon	9th	2017–18
France	2020 Trophée des Champions	Paris Saint-Germain	2–1	Marseille	10th	2019
(Georgia (country)) Georgia	2020 Georgian Cup	Gagra	0–0 (a.e.t.) (5–3 p)	Samgurali	2nd	2011
(Georgia (country)) Georgia	2020 Georgian Super Cup	Saburtalo Tbilisi	1–0	Dinamo Tbilisi	8th	2014
Germany	2019–20 DFB-Pokal	Bayern Munich	4–2	Bayer Leverkusen	20th	2018–19
Germany	2020 DFL-Supercup	Bayern Munich	3–2	Borussia Dortmund	7th	2018
Gibraltar	2020 Rock Cup	Tournament abandoned due to the COVID-19 pandemic				
Greece	2019–20 Greek Football Cup	Olympiacos	1–0	AEK Athens	28th	2014–15
Hungary	2019–20 Magyar Kupa	Budapest Honvéd	2–1	Mezőkövesdi SE	8th	2008–09
Iceland	2020 Icelandic Cup	Tournament abandoned due to the COVID-19 pandemic				
Iceland	2020 Deildabikar	Tournament abandoned due to the COVID-19 pandemic				
Iceland	2020 Icelandic Men's Football Super Cup	KR	1–0	Víkingur R.	7th	2014
(Republic of Ireland) Ireland	2020 FAI Cup	Dundalk	4–2	Shamrock Rovers	11th	2018
Israel	2019–20 Israel State Cup	Hapoel Be'er Sheva	2–0	Maccabi Petah Tikva	2nd	1996–97
Israel	2019–20 Toto Cup Al	Beitar Jerusalem	2–0	Maccabi Tel Aviv	3rd	2009–10
Israel	2019-20 Israel Super Cup	Maccabi Tel Aviv	2–0 (a.e.t.) (2–0 p)	Hapoel Be'er Sheva	7th	2018–19
Italy	2019–20 Coppa Italia	Napoli	0–0 (4–2 p)	Juventus	6th	2013–14
Italy	2020 Supercoppa Italiana	Juventus	2–0	Napoli	9th	2018
Kazakhstan	2020 Kazakhstan Cup	Tournament abandoned due to the COVID-19 pandemic				
Kazakhstan	2020 Kazakhstan Super Cup	Astana	1–0	Kaysar Kyzylorda	6th	2019
Kosovo	2019–20 Kosovar Cup	Prishtina	1–0	Ballkani	7th	2017–18
Kosovo	2020 Kosovar Supercup	Prishtina	3–1	Drita	10th	2016
Latvia	2020 Latvian Football Cup	Liepāja	1–0	Ventspils	2nd	2017
Liechtenstein	2019–20 Liechtenstein Cup	Tournament abandoned due to the COVID-19 pandemic				
Lithuania	2020 Lithuanian Football Cup	Panevėžys	1–1 (a.e.t.) (5–4 p)	Sūduva	1st	-
Lithuania	2020 Lithuanian Supercup	Žalgiris	1–0	Sūduva	4th	2017
Luxembourg	2019–20 Luxembourg Cup	Tournament abandoned due to the COVID-19 pandemic				
Malta	2019–20 Maltese FA Trophy	Tournament abandoned due to the COVID-19 pandemic				
Malta	2020 Maltese Super Cup	Not Held				
Moldova	2019–20 Moldovan Cup	Petrocub Hîncești	0–0 (a.e.t.) (5–3 p)	Sfântul Gheorghe	1st	—
Moldova	2020 Moldovan Super Cup	Not Held				
Montenegro	2019–20 Montenegrin Cup	Tournament abandoned due to the COVID-19 pandemic				
Netherlands	2019–20 KNVB Cup	Final cancelled, due to the COVID-19 pandemic				
Netherlands	2020 Johan Cruyff Shield	Not Held				
North Macedonia	2019–20 Macedonian Football Cup	Tournament abandoned due to the COVID-19 pandemic				
Northern Ireland	2019–20 Irish Cup	Glentoran	2–1	Ballymena United	23rd	2014–15
Northern Ireland	2019–20 NIFL Cup	Coleraine	2–1	Crusaders	2nd	1987–88
Norway	2020 Norwegian Football Cup	Tournament abandoned due to the COVID-19 pandemic				
Norway	2020 Mesterfinalen	Tournament abandoned due to the COVID-19 pandemic				
Poland	2019–20 Polish Cup	Cracovia	3–2 (a.e.t.)	Lechia Gdańsk	1st	—
Poland	2020 Polish Super Cup	Cracovia	0–0 (a.e.t.) (5–4 p)	Warsaw	1st	—
Portugal	2019–20 Taça de Portugal	Porto	2–1	Benfica	17th	2010–11
Portugal	2019–20 Taça da Liga	Braga	1–0	Porto	2nd	2012–13
Portugal	2020 Supertaça Cândido de Oliveira	Porto	2–0	Benfica	2nd	2018
Romania	2019–20 Cupa României	FCSB	1–0	Sepsi Sfântu Gheorghe	23rd	2014–15
Russia	2019–20 Russian Cup	Zenit Saint Petersburg	1–0	Khimki	5th	2015–16
Russia	2020 Russian Super Cup	Zenit Saint Petersburg	2–1	Lokomotiv Moscow	5th	2016
San Marino	2019–20 Coppa Titano	Tournament abandoned due to the COVID-19 pandemic				
Scotland	2019–20 Scottish Cup	Celtic	3–3 (a.e.t.) (4–3 p)	Heart of Midlothian	40th	2018–19
Scotland	2019–20 Scottish League Cup	Celtic	1–0	Rangers	19th	2018–19
Serbia	2019–20 Serbian Cup	Vojvodina	2–2 (a.e.t.) (4–2 p)	Partizan	2nd	2013–14
Slovakia	2019–20 Slovak Cup	Slovan Bratislava	1–0	Ružomberok	16th	2017–18
Slovenia	2019–20 Slovenian Cup	Mura	2–0	Nafta	1st	—
Spain	2019–20 Copa del Rey	Real Sociedad	1–0	Athletic Bilbao	3rd	1986–87
Spain	2019–20 Supercopa de España	Real Madrid	0–0 (a.e.t.) (4–1 p)	Atlético Madrid	11th	2017
Sweden	2019–20 Svenska Cupen	IFK Göteborg	2–1 (a.e.t.)	Malmö FF	8th	2014–15
Switzerland	2019–20 Swiss Cup	Young Boys	2–1	FC Basel	7th	1986–87
Turkey	2019–20 Turkish Cup	Trabzonspor	2–0	Alanyaspor	9th	2009–10
Turkey	2020 Turkish Super Cup	Trabzonspor	2–1	İstanbul Başakşehir	9th	2010
Ukraine	2019–20 Ukrainian Cup	Dynamo Kyiv	1–1 (a.e.t.) (8–7 p)	Vorskla Poltava	12th	2014–15
Ukraine	2020 Ukrainian Super Cup	Dynamo Kyiv	3–1	Shakhtar Donetsk	12nd	2019
Wales	2019–20 Welsh Cup	Tournament abandoned due to the COVID-19 pandemic				
Wales	2019–20 Welsh League Cup	Connah's Quay Nomads	3–0	STM Sports	2nd	1995–96

=== AFC ===
Nation	Tournament	Champion	Final score	Second place	Title	Last honour
Australia	2020 FFA Cup	Tournament cancelled due to the COVID-19 pandemic				
Bahrain	2019–20 Bahraini King's Cup	Al Muharraq	1–0	Al-Hidd	34th	2015–16
Bahrain	2019–20 Bahraini FA Cup	Al Muharraq	4–1	Busaiteen	3rd	2009
Bangladesh	2019–20 Bangladesh Federation Cup	Bashundhara Kings	2–1	Rahmatganj MFS	1st	—
Brunei	2019–20 Brunei FA Cup	Tournament cancelled due to the COVID-19 pandemic				
Brunei	2020 Sumbangsih Cup	Kota Ranger	3–1	ABDB	1st	—
Cambodia	2020 Hun Sen Cup	Visakha	2–0	Nagaworld	1st	—
China	2020 Chinese FA Cup	Shandong Luneng Taishan	2–0	Jiangsu Suning	6th	2014
China	2020 Chinese FA Super Cup	Tournament cancelled due to the COVID-19 pandemic				
(Timor-Leste) East Timor	Copa FFTL 2020	Lalenok United	2–1	SLB Laulara	1st	—
(Timor-Leste) East Timor	2020 Taça 12 de Novembro	Lalenok United	1–1(4–1 p)	SLB Laulara	2nd	2019
Hong Kong	2019–20 Hong Kong Senior Challenge Shield	Eastern	2–0	Lee Man	11th	2015–16
Hong Kong	2019–20 Hong Kong FA Cup	Eastern	2–0	R&F	5th	2013–14
Hong Kong	2019-20 Hong Kong Sapling Cup	Kitchee	3–1	Southern	2nd	2017–18
India	2020 Indian Super Cup	Tournament cancelled due to the COVID-19 pandemic				
Indonesia	2020 Indonesia President's Cup	Not Held				
Iran	2019–20 Hazfi Cup	Tractor	3–2	Esteghlal	2nd	2013–14
Iran	2020 Iranian Super Cup	Persepolis	1–0	Tractor	4th	2019
Iraq	2019–20 Iraq FA Cup	Season abandoned on 3 June 2020, due to the COVID-19 pandemic				
Iraq	2020 Iraqi Super Cup	Not Played				
Japan	2020 Emperor's Cup (Note: The Emperor's Cup final is traditionally held on 1 January of the next calendar year.)	Kawasaki Frontale	1–0	Gamba Osaka	1st	—
Japan	2020 J.League Cup	FC Tokyo	2–1	Kashiwa Reysol	3rd	2009
Japan	2020 Japanese Super Cup	Vissel Kobe	3–3(3–2 p)	Yokohama F. Marinos	1st	—
Jordan	2019–20 Jordan FA Shield	Al-Wehdat	2–1	Al-Ramtha	10th	2017
Jordan	2019–20 Jordan Super Cup	Al Faisaly	1–1(4–3 p)	Al-Jazeera	17th	2017
Kuwait	2019–20 Kuwait Emir Cup	Al-Arabi	2–1 (a.e.t.)	Kuwait SC	16th	2008
Kuwait	2019–20 Kuwait Crown Prince Cup	Kuwait SC	0–0 (a.e.t.) (3–2 p)	Al-Arabi	8th	2014–15
Kuwait	2020 Kuwait Super Cup	Kuwait	2–1	Al-Arabi	4th	2017
Kyrgyzstan	2020 Kyrgyzstan Cup	FC Alay	1–0	Abdysh-Ata	2nd	2013
Kyrgyzstan	2020 Kyrgyzstan Super Cup	Dordoi Bishkek	UnKnown	Neftchi Kochkor-Ata	4th	2018–19
Laos	2020 Lao FF Cup	Young Elephants	2–1	Muang Hat United	1st	—
Lebanon	2019–20 Lebanese FA Cup	All tournaments cancelled due to the COVID-19 pandemic				
Lebanon	2020 Lebanese Elite Cup	All tournaments cancelled due to the COVID-19 pandemic				
Lebanon	2020 Lebanese Challenge Cup	All tournaments cancelled due to the COVID-19 pandemic				
Lebanon	2020 Lebanese Super Cup	All tournaments cancelled due to the COVID-19 pandemic				
Macau	2020 Taça de Macau	Not Held				
Malaysia	2020 Piala Sumbangsih	Johor Darul Ta'zim FC	1–0	Kedah FA	5th	2019
Malaysia	2020 Malaysia Cup	Season abandoned on 12 November 2020, due to the COVID-19 pandemic				
Malaysia	2020 Malaysia FA Cup	Season abandoned on 1 May 2020, due to the COVID-19 pandemic				
Malaysia	2020 Malaysia Challenge Cup	Season abandoned on 1 May 2020, due to the COVID-19 pandemic				
Maldives	2020 Maldives FA Cup	Season abandoned on 31 March 2020, due to the COVID-19 pandemic				
Maldives	2020 Maldivian FA Charity Shield	Eagles	3–2	Maziya	4th	2017
Myanmar	2020 General Aung San Shield	Tournament cancelled due to the COVID-19 pandemic				
North Korea	2020 Hwaebul Cup					
Oman	2019–20 Sultan Qaboos Cup	Dhofar	1–1 (5–4 p)	Al-Orouba	9th	2011
Oman	2020 Oman Super Cup	Al-Seeb	Unknown	Dhofar	1st	—
Pakistan	2020 PFF National Challenge Cup	WAPDA	1–0	SSGC	1st	—
Palestine	2019–20 Palestine Cup	Not Held				
Palestine	2019–20 Gaza Strip Cup	Shabab Rafah	3–0	Gaza	8th	2016–17
Palestine	2020 Gaza Strip Super Cup	Shabab Rafah	0–0 (4–3 p)	Khadamat Rafah	5th	2018
Philippines	2020 Copa Paulino Alcantara	Tournament cancelled due to the COVID-19 pandemic				
Qatar	2020 Emir of Qatar Cup	Al Sadd	2–1	Al-Arabi	17th	2017
Qatar	2019–20 Qatari Stars Cup	Al Sadd	4–0	Al-Arabi	2nd	2010
Saudi Arabia	2020 King Cup	Al Hilal	2–1	Al Nassr	9th	2017
Saudi Arabia	2020 Saudi Super Cup	Al Nassr	3–0	Al Hilal	2nd	2019
Singapore	2020 Singapore Cup	Tournament cancelled due to the COVID-19 pandemic				
Singapore	2020 Singapore Community Shield	Tampines Rovers	3–0	Hougang United	5th	2014
South Korea	2020 Korean FA Cup	Jeonbuk Hyundai Motors	3–2	Ulsan Hyundai	4th	2005
Sri Lanka	2019–20 Sri Lanka FA Cup	Police	1–1 (5–4 p)	Saunders	4th	2008
Syria	2019–20 Syrian Cup	Al-Wahda	3–1	Al-Majd	8th	2017
Syria	2020 Syrian Super Cup	Al-Wahda	2–1	Tishreen	2nd	1993
Tajikistan	2020 Tajikistan Cup	Ravshan Kulob	1–0	Khatlon	2nd	1994
Tajikistan	2020 TFF Cup	Kuktosh Rudaki	2–1	Ravshan Kulob	1st	—
Turkmenistan	2020 Turkmenistan Cup	Altyn Asyr	1–1(3–0 p)	Köpetdag Aşgabat	5th	2019
Turkmenistan	2020 Turkmenistan Super Cup	Altyn Asyr	1–1(5–4 p)	Ahal	6th	2019
United Arab Emirates	2019–20 UAE President's Cup	Season abandoned on 18 June 2020, due to the COVID-19 pandemic				
United Arab Emirates	2019–20 UAE League Cup	Al Nasr	2–1	Shabab Al Ahli	2nd	2014–15
United Arab Emirates	2020 UAE Super Cup	Shabab Al Ahli	1–0	Sharjah	5th	2016
Uzbekistan	2020 Uzbekistan Cup	Pakhtakor Tashkent	3–0	AGMK	12th	2011
Vietnam	2020 Vietnamese Cup	Hanoi	2–1	Viettel	2nd	2019
Vietnam	2020 Vietnamese Super Cup	Hanoi	1–0	Viettel	3rd	2019

=== CAF ===
Nation	Tournament	Champion	Final score	Second place	Title	Last honour
Algeria	2019–20 Algerian Cup	Tournament cancelled due to the COVID-19 pandemic				
Algeria	2020 Algerian Super Cup	CR Belouizdad	2–1	USM Alger	2nd	1995
Angola	2020 Angola Cup	Tournament cancelled due to the COVID-19 pandemic				
Benin	2020 Benin Cup	Not Played				
Botswana	2020–21 FA Challenge Cup	Tournament cancelled due to the COVID-19 pandemic				
Botswana	2019–20 Mascom Top 8 Cup	Orapa United	1–1 (4–3 p)	Township Rollers	2nd	2016
Burkina Faso	2020 Coupe du Faso	Tournament cancelled due to the COVID-19 pandemic				
Burkina Faso	2020 Burkina Faso Super Cup	Rahimo	3–2	Salimata	1st	—
Burundi	2020 Coupe du Président de la République	Musongati	1–1 (a.e.t.) (5–4 p)	Rukinzo	1st	—
Burundi	2020 Coupe de l'Unité	Aigle Noir Makamba	2–1	Messager Ngozi	1st	—
Cameroon	2020 Cameroonian Cup	Season abandoned due to the COVID-19 pandemic				
Cameroon	2020 Super Coupe Roger Milla					
Cape Verde	2020 Taça Nacional de Cabo Verde	Tournament cancelled due to the COVID-19 pandemic				
Cape Verde	2020 Cape Verdean Independence Cup					
Cape Verde	2020 Supertaça de Cabo Verde	Santo Crucifixo	3–1	CS Mindelense	1st	—
Central African Republic	2020 Central African Republic Coupe Nationale	AS Tempête Mocaf	1–1 (4–3 p)	DFC8	7th	2011
Chad	2020 Supercoupe du Tchad					
Comoros	2020 Comoros Cup	US Zilimadjou	2–0	Ngazi	1st	—
(Republic of the Congo) Congo	2020 Coupe du Congo	Tournament cancelled due to the COVID-19 pandemic				
Djibouti	2020 Djibouti Cup	Arta/Solar7	1–0	ASAS/Djibouti Télécom	2nd	2019
Djibouti	2020 Djibouti Super Cup	Garde Républicaine	4–1	Arta/Solar7	4th	2012
(Democratic Republic of the Congo) DR Congo	2020 Coupe du Congo	Season abandoned due to the COVID-19 pandemic				
Egypt	2019–20 Egypt Cup	Al Ahly	1–1 (3–2 p)	Tala'ea El Gaish	36th	2018–19
Egypt	2019–20 Egyptian Super Cup	Zamalek	0–0 (4–3 p)	Al Ahly	4th	2016–17
Equatorial Guinea	2020 Equatoguinean Cup	Not Held				
Eswatini	2020 Swazi Cup	Tournament cancelled due to the COVID-19 pandemic				
Ethiopia	2020 Ethiopian Cup					
Ethiopia	2020 Ethiopian Super Cup					
Ghana	2020 Ghanaian FA Cup	Tournament cancelled due to the COVID-19 pandemic				
Guinea-Bissau	2020 Taça Nacional da Guiné Bissau	Tournament cancelled due to the COVID-19 pandemic				
Ivory Coast	2020 Coupe de Côte d'Ivoire	Tournament cancelled due to the COVID-19 pandemic				
Kenya	2020 FKF President's Cup	Season abandoned due to the COVID-19 pandemic				
Liberia	2020 Liberian FA Cup	Tournament cancelled due to the COVID-19 pandemic				
Liberia	2020 Liberian Super Cup					
Madagascar	2020 Coupe de Madagascar	Season abandoned due to the COVID-19 pandemic				
Mali	2020 Malian Cup	Tournament cancelled due to the COVID-19 pandemic				
Mauritania	2020 Mauritanian President's Cup	Tevragh-Zeina	2–0	ASC Snim	5th	2016
Mauritius	2020 Mauritian Cup	Tournament cancelled due to the COVID-19 pandemic				
Mauritius	2019-20 Mauritian Republic Cup	Pamplemousses	4–2	Petite Rivière Noire	6th	2019
Morocco	2020 Moroccan Throne Cup					
Mozambique	2020 Taça de Moçambique	Not Held				
Niger	2020 Niger Cup	Tournament cancelled due to the COVID-19 pandemic				
Nigeria	2020 AITEO Cup	Tournament cancelled due to the COVID-19 pandemic				
Rwanda	2020 Rwandan Cup	Not Held				
Senegal	2020 Senegal FA Cup	Tournament cancelled due to the COVID-19 pandemic				
Senegal	2020 Senegalese League Cup	Tournament cancelled due to the COVID-19 pandemic				
Seychelles	2020 Seychelles FA Cup	Foresters	4–2	Côte d'Or	1st	—
Seychelles	2020 Seychelles Presidents Cup	Côte d'Or	1–0	Foresters	2nd	2019
Somalia	2020 Somalia Cup	Horseed	3–0	Dekedaha	9th	2019
South Africa	2019–20 Nedbank Cup	Mamelodi Sundowns	1–0	Bloemfontein Celtic	5th	2014–15
South Africa	2020 MTN 8	Orlando Pirates	2–1	Bloemfontein Celtic	10th	2000
South Sudan	2020 South Sudan National Cup	Al-Rabita	2–0	Nile City	1st	—
Sudan	2019-20 Sudan Cup	Tournament cancelled due to the COVID-19 pandemic				
Tanzania	2019-20 Tanzania FA Cup	Simba	2–1	Namungo	3rd	2016–17
Tanzania	2020 Tanzania Community Shield	Simba	2–0	Namungo	9th	2019
Togo	2020 Coupe du Togo	Not held				
Togo	2020 Supercoupe du Togo					
Tunisia	2019-20 Tunisian Cup	US Monastir	2–0	ES Tunis	1st	—
Tunisia	2020 Tunisian Super Cup	ES Tunis	0–0 (5–4 p)	US Monastir	6th	2019
Uganda	2020 Uganda Cup	Tournament cancelled due to the COVID-19 pandemic				
Zambia	2020 ABSA Cup	Tournament cancelled due to the COVID-19 pandemic				
Zambia	2020 Zambian Charity Shield	Nkana	2–0	Indeni	17th	2019
Zanzibar	2020 Zanzibar FA Cup	Season abandoned due to the COVID-19 pandemic				
Zimbabwe	2020 Chibuku Super Cup	Not held				
Zimbabwe	2020 Independence Trophy Cup	Not held				

=== CONCACAF ===
Nation	Tournament	Champion	Final score	Second place	Title	Last honour
Aruba	2020 Torneo Copa Betico Croes	R.C.A.	3–1	SV Dakota	3rd	2016
Barbados	2020 Barbados FA Cup					
Barbados	2020 Capellisport Super Cup					
Bermuda	2020 Bermuda FA Cup	Tournament abandoned due to the COVID-19 pandemic				
Bermuda	2019-20 Friendship Trophy	Southampton Rangers	1–0	Devonshire Cougars	4th	1992
Canada	2020 Canadian Championship					
Cayman Islands	2019-20 Cayman Islands FA Cup	Not Held				
Cayman Islands	2019-20 Cayman Islands President's Cup	Latinos	2–1	Scholars International	1st	—
El Salvador	2019–20 Copa El Salvador					
Grenada	2020 GFA Club Championship	Hurricanes	3–1	Fontenoy United	1st	-
Guadeloupe	2020 Coupe de Guadeloupe	CS Moulien	2–1	Phare du Canal	11th	2017
Guatemala	2019-20 Copa Centenario					
Mexico	2019–20 Copa MX	Monterrey	2–1	Tijuana	3rd	Apertura 2017
Mexico	2020 Campeón de Campeones	Tournament abandoned due to the COVID-19 pandemic				
Nicaragua	2020 Copa de Nicaragua					
Saint Kitts and Nevis	2019-20 Saint Kitts and Nevis National Cup	St. Paul's United	2–0	St. Peter's	2nd	2012
Suriname	2019-20 SVB Cup					
Suriname	2020 Suriname President's Cup					
Turks and Caicos Islands	2020 Turks Head Cup					
United States	2020 U.S. Open Cup	Tournament abandoned due to the COVID-19 pandemic				

=== CONMEBOL ===
Nation	Tournament	Champion	Final score	Second place	Title	Last honour
Argentina	2019–20 Copa Argentina	Tournament postponed to 2021 due to the COVID-19 pandemic				
Argentina	2020 Copa de la Superliga	Tournament abandoned on 28 April 2020, due to the COVID-19 pandemic				
Argentina	2020 Copa de la Liga Profesional	Boca Juniors	1–1 (a.e.t.) (5–3 p)	Banfield	1st	—
Brazil	2020 Copa do Brasil	Palmeiras	3–0	Grêmio	4th	2015
Brazil	2020 Copa do Nordeste	Ceará	4–1	Bahia	2nd	2015
Chile	2020 Copa Chile	Tournament cancelled due to the COVID-19 pandemic				
Colombia	2020 Copa Colombia	Independiente Medellín	1–1 (5–4 p)	Deportes Tolima	3rd	2019
Colombia	2020 Superliga Colombiana	Junior	3–2	América de Cali	2nd	2019
Ecuador	2020 Copa Ecuador	Tournament cancelled due to the COVID-19 pandemic				
Paraguay	2020 Copa Paraguay	Tournament cancelled due to the COVID-19 pandemic				
Peru	2020 Copa Bicentenario	Tournament cancelled due to the COVID-19 pandemic				
Uruguay	2020 Supercopa Uruguaya	Liverpool	4–2 (a.e.t.)	Nacional	1st	—
Venezuela	2020 Copa Venezuela	Tournament not held				

=== OFC ===
Nation	Tournament	Champion	Final score	Second place	Title	Last honour
Cook Islands	2020 Cook Islands Cup	Nikao Sokattak	2–1	Tupapa Maraerenga	10th	2012
Fiji	2020 Fiji Interdistrict Championship	Labasa	2–1	Lautoka	6th	2019
New Caledonia	2020 Coupe de Calédonie	Hienghène Sport	3–1	Ne Drehu	4th	2015
New Zealand	2020 Chatham Cup	Tournament cancelled due to the COVID-19 pandemic				
(French Polynesia) Tahiti	2020 Tahiti Cup	Tournament cancelled due to the COVID-19 pandemic				
Tonga	2020 Tonga Cup	Veitongo	4–1	Lavengatonga	1st	—
Tuvalu	2020 NBT Cup	Nauti	Unknown	Tofaga	3rd	2010
Tuvalu	2020 Tuvalu Independence Cup	Vaitupu	Unknown	Nukulaelae	1st	—
Tuvalu	2020 Christmas Cup	Nauti	Unknown	Unknown	2nd	2018

=== Non-FIFA ===
Nation	Tournament	Champion	Final score	Second place	Title	Last honour
Gozo	2019-20 G.F.A. Cup					
Northern Cyprus	2020 Cypriot Cup	Yenicami	3–1	Mağusa Türk Gücü	7th	2015
Vatican City	2020 Clericus Cup	Not Held				

== Women's leagues ==
=== UEFA ===
Nation	League	Champion	Second place	Title	Last honour
Albania	2019–20 National Championship	Vllaznia Shkodër	Apolonia Fier	6th	2018–19
Austria	2019–20 ÖFB-Frauenliga	Season abandoned, due to the COVID-19 pandemic			
Belarus	2020 Belarusian Premier League	Dynama-BDUFK Minsk	FC Minsk	1st	–
Belgium	2019–20 Super League	Anderlecht	Standard Liège	3rd	2018–19
Bosnia and Herzegovina	2019–20 Bosnia and Herzegovina Women's Premier League	SFK 2000	Emina	18th	2018–19
Bulgaria	2019–20 Bulgarian women's football championship	NSA Sofia	Paldin	18th	2018–19
Croatia	2019–20 First League	Split	Osijek	2nd	2018–19
Cyprus	2019–20 First Division	Season abandoned, due to the COVID-19 pandemic			
Czech Republic	2019–20 First Division	Slavia Prague	Sparta Prague	7th	2016–17
Denmark	2019–20 Elitedivisionen	Fortuna Hjørring	Brøndby	11th	2017–18
England	2019–20 FA WSL	Chelsea	Manchester City	3rd	2017–18
Estonia	2020 Naiste Meistriliiga	Flora	Saku Sporting	3rd	2019
Faroe Islands	2020 1. deild kvinnur	KÍ	NSÍ	20th	2019
Finland	2020 Kansallinen Liiga	Åland United	TiPS	1st	–
France	2019–20 Division 1 Féminine	Lyon	Paris Saint-Germain	14th	2018–19
(Georgia (country)) Georgia	2020 Georgia women's football championship	Tbilisi Nike	Lanchkhuti	2nd	2018
Germany	2019–20 Frauen-Bundesliga	VfL Wolfsburg	Bayern Munich	6th	2018–19
Gibraltar	2019–20 Gibraltar Women's Football League	Lincoln Red Imps	Lions Gibraltar	4th	2018–19
Greece	2020 Greek A Division	P.A.O.K.	Aris Saloniki	15th	2018–19
Hungary	2019–20 Női NB I	Season abandoned, due to the COVID-19 pandemic			
Iceland	2020 Úrvalsdeild	Breiğablik	Valur	17th	2018
(Republic of Ireland) Ireland	2020 National League	Peamount United	Shelbourne	3rd	2019
Israel	2019–20 Ligat Nashim	Ramat HaSharon	Kiryat Gat	2nd	2015–16
Italy	2019–20 Serie A	Juventus	Fiorentina	3rd	2018–19
Kazakhstan	2020 Kazakhstani women's football championship	BIIK Kazygurt	Okzhetpes	8th	2018–19
Kosovo	2019–20 Kosovo Women's Football League	KFF Mitrovica	KFF Feronikeli	3rd	2018–19
Latvia	2020 Latvian Women's League	Rīgas FS	FS Metta Rīga	7th	2018
Lithuania	2020 A-Lyga	Gintra Universitetas	Žalgiris	17th	2019
Luxembourg	2019–20 Dames Ligue 1	Season abandoned, due to the COVID-19 pandemic			
Malta	2019–20 Maltese First Division	Birkirkara	Mġarr United	9th	2018–19
Moldova	2019–20 Moldovan Women Top League	Season abandoned, due to the COVID-19 pandemic			
Montenegro	2019–20 Montenegrin Women's League	Breznica Pljevlja	Budućnost Podgorica	5th	2018–19
Netherlands	2019–20 Eredivisie	Season abandoned on 24 April 2020, due to the COVID-19 pandemic			
North Macedonia	2019–20 Macedonian women's football championship	Season abandoned, due to the COVID-19 pandemic			
Northern Ireland	2020 Women's Premiership	Glentoran	Linfield	8th	2014
Norway	2020 Toppserien	Vålerenga	Rosenborg	1st	–
Poland	2019–20 Ekstraliga	Górnik Łęczna	Medyk Konin	3rd	2018–19
Portugal	2019–20 Campeonato Nacional	Season abandoned on 8 April 2020, due to the COVID-19 pandemic			
Romania	2019–20 Liga I	Olimpia Cluj	Universitatea Galați	10th	2018–19
Russia	2020 Championship	CSKA Moscow	Lokomotiv Moscow	2nd	2019
Scotland	2020 SWPL 1	Season abandoned, due to the COVID-19 pandemic			
Serbia	2019–20 Serbian SuperLiga	Spartak Subotica	Sloga Radnički	10th	2018–19
Slovakia	2019–20 Slovak Women's First League	Season abandoned, due to the COVID-19 pandemic			
Slovenia	2019–20 Slovenian Women's League	Season abandoned, due to the COVID-19 pandemic			
Spain	2019–20 Primera División	Barcelona	Atlético Madrid	5th	2014–15
Sweden	2020 Damallsvenskan	Kopparbergs/Göteborg	Rosengård	1st	–
Switzerland	2019–20 Swiss Women's Super League	Season abandoned, due to the COVID-19 pandemic			
Turkey	2019–20 First Football League	Season abandoned on 8 July 2020, due to the COVID-19 pandemic			
Ukraine	2019–20 Women's League	Zhytlobud-2 Kharkiv	Zhytlobud-1 Kharkiv	3rd	2017
Wales	2019–20 Welsh Premier League	Swansea City	Cardiff Met.	4th	2016–17

=== AFC ===
Nation	Tournament	Champion	Second place	Title	Last honour
Afghanistan	2020 Afghan Women's Premier League	Herat	Kabul	1st	—
Australia	2019–20 W-League	Melbourne City	Melbourne Victory	2nd	2015–16
Bangladesh	2020 Bangladesh Women's Football League	Bashundhara Kings	Nasrin Sporting Academy	1st	—
China	2020 Chinese Women's Super League	Wuhan Jiangda	Jiangsu Suning	1st	—
Chinese Taipei	2020 Taiwan Mulan Football League	Hualien	Taichung Blue Whale	4th	2016
(Timor-Leste) East Timor	2020 Palmares	Buibere	Maranatha	1st	—
Hong Kong	2019–20 Hong Kong Women League	Kitchee	Eastern	2nd	2018
India	2019–20 Indian Women's Super League	Gokulam Kerala	KRYPHSA	1st	—
Iran	2019–20 Kowsar Women Football League	Shahrdari Bam	Vochan Kordestan	7th	2018–19
Japan	2020 Nadeshiko League Division 1	Urawa Red Diamonds	INAC Kobe Leonessa	4th	2014
Laos	2020 Laos Women's League	Chanthabouly	Master 7	5th	2019
Mongolia	2020 Mongolia Women's League	Deren	Tuuliin Tom Tunuud	2nd	2018
North Korea	2019–20 DPR Korea Women's Football League	Season abandoned due to the COVID-19 pandemic			
Lebanon	2019–20 Lebanese Women's Football League	SAS	Safa	5th	2018–19
Pakistan	2019–20 National Women Football Championship	Pakistan Army	Karachi United	2nd	2018
Palestine	2019–20 Palestine Women's League				
Philippines	2019–20 PFF Women's League	De La Salle University	Far Eastern University	3rd	2018
South Korea	2020 WK League	Incheon Red Angels	Gyeongju KHNP	8th	2019
Uzbekistan	2020 Uzbek Women's Football Championship	Not held			
Vietnam	2020 Vietnam Women's Football League	Than Po Ho Chi Minh	Hanoi I	9th	2019

=== CAF ===
Nation	Tournament	Champion	Second place	Title	Last honour
Algeria	2019–20 Ligue nationale				
Botswana	2019–20 GCRFA Region Women's Mini League				
(Burkina Faso) Burkina faso	2019–20 Première Division				
Burundi	2019–20 Première Division				
Cameroon	2019–20 Cameroon Championnat de Ligue 1	Louves Minproff	AS Awa Filles	5th	2019
(Democratic Republic of the Congo) DR Congo	2019–20 Ligue Provinciale Féminine de Kinshasa				
Djibouti	2019–20 Djibouti Championnat National	Forces Armées de Djibouti	GR/SIAF	5th	2018–19
Egypt	2019–20 Egyptian Women's Premier League				
Eswatini	2019–20 Women Football League				
Ethiopia	2019–20 Ethiopian Women Premier League				
Ghana	2019–20 Women's Premier League				
Lesotho	2019–20 Lesotho Women's Super League				
South Africa	2019–20 SAFA Women's League	Mamelodi Sundowns	TUT Ladies	3rd	2015
Tanzania	2019–20 Tanzania Women's League	Simba Queens	JKT Queens	1st	—

=== CONCACAF ===
Nation	League	Champion	Second place	Title	Last honour
Antigua and Barbuda	2020 Antigua and Barbuda Women's Football League				
Aruba	2019–20 Aruban Women's Football League	Season abandoned, due to the COVID-19 pandemic			
Cayman Islands	2019–20 Cayman Islands Women's Premier League	Elite	Scholars	1st	—
Costa Rica	2020 Costa Rican women's football championship				
Dominica	2020 Dominica Women's Premier League				
Dominican Republic	2019–20 Liga Femenina Dominicana				
El Salvador	2020 Salvadoran women's football championship	Season abandoned, due to the COVID-19 pandemic			
Guatemala	2020 Apertura	Unifut-Rosal	Deportivo Xela	17th	2019 Clausura
Guatemala	2020 Clausura	Season abandoned, due to the COVID-19 pandemic			
Mexico	2020 Liga MX Femenil Clausura	Season abandoned on 22 May 2020, due to the COVID-19 pandemic			
Mexico	2019 Liga MX Femenil Apertura	Monterrey	UANL	1st	—
Puerto Rico	2019–20 Liga Superior Femenina	Season abandoned, due to the COVID-19 pandemic			
United States	2020 NWSL season	Season abandoned, due to the COVID-19 pandemic			

=== CONMEBOL ===
Nation	League	Champion	Second place	Title	Last honour
Argentina	2019–20 Campeonato de Fútbol Femenino	Season abandoned, due to the COVID-19 pandemic			
Argentina	2020 Campeonato de Fútbol Femenino	Boca Juniors	River Plate	24th	2013 In
Bolivia	2020 Bolivian women's football championship				
Brazil	2020 Campeonato Brasileiro de Futebol Feminino Série A1	Corinthians	Kindermann/Avaí	2nd	2018
Chile	2020 Chilean women's football championship(Transición)	Santiago Morning	Universidad de Chile	3rd	2019
Colombia	2020 Colombian Women's Football League	Santa Fe	América de Cali	2nd	2017
Ecuador	2020 Ecuadorian women's football championship	El Nacional	Ñañas	1st	–
Paraguay	2020 Paraguayan women's football championship				
Peru	2020 Peruvian women's football championship				
Uruguay	2020 Campeonato Uruguayo Femenino	Nacional	Peñarol	5th	2011
Venezuela	2020 Venezuelan women's football championship				

=== OFC ===
Nation	League	Champion	Second place	Title	Last honour
Cook Islands	2020 Rarotonga club championship				
New Zealand	2020 Women's Premiership	Canterbury United Pride	Capital Football	6th	2019
American Samoa	2020 FFAS Women's National League				
Samoa	2020 Upolu Women's Premier League				
Solomon Islands	2020 Solrais Women's Premier League				
(French Polynesia) Tahiti	2019–20 Tahiti Women's Ligue				
Tonga	2020 Kautaha Soka 'A Tonga Challenge Cup				

== Women's domestic cups ==
=== UEFA ===
Nation	Tournament	Champion	Final score	Second place	Title	Last honor
Albania	2019–20 Albanian Women's Cup	Vllaznia	4–0	Apolonia	7th	2018–19
Austria	2019–20 ÖFB Ladies Cup	Tournament abandoned due to the COVID-19 pandemic				
Belarus	2019–20 Belarusian Women's Cup	Dynama-BDUFK Minsk	0–0 (a.e.t.) (5–4 p)	Minsk	1st	—
Belarus	2020 Belarusian Women's Super Cup	Minsk	5–0	Zorka-BDU	7th	2019
Belgium	2020 Belgian Women's Cup					
Bosnia and Herzegovina	2020 Bosnia and Herzegovina Women's Football Cup					
Bulgaria	2019–20 Bulgarian Women's Cup	Tournament Not Held				
Croatia	2019–20 Croatian Women's Football Cup	Tournament Not Held				
Cyprus	2019–20 Cypriot Women's Cup	Tournament abandoned due to the COVID-19 pandemic				
Czech Republic	2019–20 Czech Women's Cup	Tournament abandoned due to the COVID-19 pandemic				
Denmark	2019–20 Danish Women's Cup	Nordsjælland	1–0	Thy-Thisted Q	1st	—
England	2019–20 Women's FA Cup	Manchester City	3–1	Everton	3rd	2018–19
England	2020 Women's FA Community Shield	Chelsea	2–0	Manchester City	1st	—
England	2019–20 FA Women's League Cup	Chelsea	2–1	Arsenal	1st	—
Estonia	2020 Estonian Women's Cup	Flora	6–0	Tallinna Kalev	6th	2015–16
Estonia	2020 Estonian Women's Supercup	Flora	5–1	Tallinna Kalev	4th	2019
Faroe Islands	2020 Faroese Women's Cup	KÍ	3–0	NSÍ	15th	2016
Faroe Islands	2020 Faroese Women's Super Cup	Tournament Not Held				
Finland	2020 Finnish Women's Cup	Åland United	2–1	TiPS	1st	—
France	2020 Coupe de France féminine	Lyon	0–0 (4–3 p)	Paris Saint-Germain	9th	2018–19
France	2020 Trophée des Championnes					
Germany	2019–20 DFB-Pokal Frauen	VfL Wolfsburg	3–3 (a.e.t.) (4–2 p)	SGS Essen	7th	2018–19
Gibraltar	2020 Women's Rock Cup	Tournament abandoned due to the COVID-19 pandemic				
Hungary	2020 Hungarian Women's Cup	Tournament abandoned due to the COVID-19 pandemic				
Iceland	2020 Icelandic Women's Football Cup	Tournament abandoned due to the COVID-19 pandemic				
Iceland	2020 Icelandic Women's Supercup	Selfoss	2–1	Valur	1st	—
(Republic of Ireland) Ireland	2020 FAI Women's Cup	Peamount United	6–0	Cork City	1st	—
Israel	2019–20 Israeli Women's Cup	Tournament abandoned due to the COVID-19 pandemic				
Italy	2019–20 Italian Women's Cup	Tournament abandoned due to the COVID-19 pandemic				
Italy	2020 Italian Women's Super Cup	Juventus	2–0	Fiorentina	2nd	2019
Kazakhstan	2020 Kazakhstani Women's Cup	Tournament abandoned due to the COVID-19 pandemic				
Kosovo	2020 Kosovo Women's Cup	Prishtina	1–0	Ballkani	1st	—
Latvia	2020 Latvian Women's Cup	Tournament Not Held				
Luxembourg	2019–20 Luxembourg Women's Cup	Tournament abandoned due to the COVID-19 pandemic				
Malta	2019–20 Maltese Women's Cup	Tournament abandoned due to the COVID-19 pandemic				
Moldova	2019–20 Moldovan Women's Cup	Agarista-ȘS Anenii Noi	2–1	Cioburciu-GTC	3rd	2018–19
Netherlands	2019–20 KNVB Women's Cup	Tournament abandoned due to the COVID-19 pandemic				
Netherlands	2019–20 Eredivisie Cup	FC Twente	4-2 (H), 3-2 (A)	PSV	1st	—
Northern Ireland	2020 IFA Women's Challenge Cup	Tournament abandoned due to the COVID-19 pandemic				
Norway	2020 Norwegian Women's Cup	Vålerenga Fotball Damer	2–0 (a.e.t.)	LSK Kvinner	1st	—
Poland	2020–21 Polish Cup	Górnik Łęczna	1–0	Medyk Konin	2nd	2017–18
Portugal	2019–20 Taça de Portugal Feminina	Braga	3–1	Benfica	1st	—
Portugal	2020 Taça da Liga Feminina	Benfica	3–0	Braga	1st	—
Portugal	2020 Supertaça de Portugal Feminina					
Romania	2019–20 Romanian Women's Cup	Tournament abandoned due to the COVID-19 pandemic				
Russia	2019–20 Russian Women's Cup	Lokomotiv Moscow	0–0 (4–2 p)	CSKA Moscow	1st	—
Scotland	2019–20 Scottish Women's Cup	Tournament Not Held				
Serbia	2020 Serbian Women's Cup					
Slovakia	2020 Slovak Women's Cup	Tournament abandoned due to the COVID-19 pandemic				
Slovenia	2019–20 Slovenian Women's Cup	Tournament abandoned due to the COVID-19 pandemic				
Spain	2019–20 Copa de la Reina de Fútbol	Barcelona	3–0	Logroño	7th	2018
Spain	2020 Supercopa de España Femenina	Barcelona	10–1	Real Sociedad	1st	—
Sweden	2020–21 Svenska Cupen	Tournament abandoned due to the COVID-19 pandemic				
Switzerland	2020 Swiss Women's Cup	Tournament abandoned due to the COVID-19 pandemic				
Ukraine	2019–20 Ukrainian Women's Cup	Zhytlobud-2 Kharkiv	1–0	Voskhod Stara Mayachka	1st	—
Wales	2019–20 FAW Women's Cup	Tournament abandoned due to the COVID-19 pandemic				

=== AFC ===
Nation	Tournament	Champion	Final score	Second place	Title	Last honour
China	2020 Chinese Women's FA Cup	Tournament abandoned due to the COVID-19 pandemic				
China	2020 Chinese Women's FA Super Cup	Tournament abandoned due to the COVID-19 pandemic				
Chinese Taipei	2020 Taiwan Mulan League Cup	Hualien	1–0	Taichung Blue Whale	1st	—
Hong Kong	2019–20 Hong Kong Women League FA Cup	Tournament abandoned due to the COVID-19 pandemic				
Japan	2020 Empress's Cup	Nippon TV Beleza	4–3	Urawa Red Diamonds	15th	2019
Japan	2020 Nadeshiko League Cup	Tournament abandoned due to the COVID-19 pandemic				
Lebanon	2019–20 Lebanese Women's FA Cup	Tournament abandoned due to the COVID-19 pandemic				
Malaysia	2020 Piala Tun Sharifah Rodziah	Tournament abandoned due to the COVID-19 pandemic				

=== CONCACAF ===
Nation	Tournament	Champion	Final score	Second place	Title	Last honour
United States	2020 NWSL Challenge Cup	Houston Dash	2–0	Chicago Red Stars	1st	—

=== OFC ===
Nation	Tournament	Champion	Final score	Second place	Title	Last honour
New Zealand	2020 Kate Sheppard Cup	Tournament cancelled due to the COVID-19 pandemic				

== Second, third, fourth, and fifth leagues ==
=== CONCACAF ===
Nation	League	Champion	Final score	Second place	Title	Last honour
Canada	2020 Première Ligue de soccer du Québec	A.S. Blainville		Ottawa South United	4th	2019
Canada	2020 Canadian Soccer League	FC Vorkuta	2–1	Scarborough SC	2nd	2018

== Deaths ==
- 5 January – Hans Tilkowski, German football goalkeeper and manager (b. 1935)
- 6 January – Luís Morais, Brazilian football player (b. 1930)
- 7 January – Khamis Al-Dosari, Saudi Arabian footballer (b. 1973)
- 17 January – Pietro Anastasi, Italian footballer (b. 1948)
- 21 January – Theodor Wagner, Austrian footballer and manager (b. 1927)
- 24 January – Juan José Pizzuti, Argentine footballer and manager (b. 1927)
- 29 January – Keith Nelson, New Zealand footballer (b. 1947)
- 2 February – Hugo Bravo, Chilean footballer (b. 1944)
- 16 February – Harry Gregg, Northern Irish footballer (b. 1932)
- 18 March – Joaquín Peiró, Spanish football player (b. 1936)
- 19 March – Peter Whittingham, English footballer (b. 1984)
- 26 March – Michel Hidalgo, French footballer and manager (b. 1933)
- 12 April – Peter Bonetti, English footballer (b. 1941)
- 28 April – Michael Robinson, English-Irish footballer and TV commentator (b. 1958)
- 12 May – Radim Novák, Czech football goalkeeper (b. 1978)
- 28 June – Marián Čišovský, Slovak footballer (b. 1979)
- 21 August – Pedro Nájera, Mexican footballer (b. 1929)
- 21 August – Hammadi Agrebi, Tunisian footballer (b. 1951)
- 8 September – Alfred Riedl, Austrian football player and manager (b. 1949)
- 17 September – Ricardo Ciciliano, Colombian footballer (b. 1976)
- 22 September – Agne Simonsson, Swedish footballer and manager (b. 1935)
- 12 October – Carlton Chapman, Indian footballer (b. 1971)
- 20 October – Bruno Martini, French footballer (b. 1962)
- 30 October – Nobby Stiles, English footballer and manager (b. 1942)
- 15 November – Ray Clemence, English football goalkeeper (b. 1948)
- 21 November – Ricky Yacobi, Indonesian footballer (b. 1963)
- 25 November – Diego Maradona, Argentine football player and manager (b. 1960)
- 29 November – Papa Bouba Diop, Senegalese footballer (b. 1978)
- 9 December – Paolo Rossi, Italian footballer (b. 1956)
- 14 December – Gérard Houllier, French football manager (b. 1947)
- 31 December – Tommy Docherty, Scottish footballer and manager (b. 1928)
