= 2018 in women's association football =

The following are the scheduled events of women's association football for 2018 throughout the world.

== Events ==
=== January ===
- January 1 – Olympique Lyonnais is joined by Morgan Brian, whose venture would turn out to be short-lived, and Amandine Henry.
- January 5 – Stanford's Andi Sullivan is awarded the 2017 Hermann Trophy.
- January 7 – Pernille Harder becomes the first footballer in either category to win the Danish Player of the Year four years in a row.
- January 8 – John Herdman leaves the Canadian WNT for its male counterpart and is replaced by the team's assistant coach, Kenneth Heiner-Møller.
- January 11 – Portland Thorns FC trades Allie Long to Seattle Reign in exchange for Caitlin Foord and a second round pick in the 2020 Draft.
- January 14 – Arsenal and Manchester City, the only teams to win the Continental Cup after seven years, qualify for the competition's final.
- January 18 — NWSL stars Sam Kerr, Carli Lloyd and Christen Press are transferred to Chicago Red Stars, Sky Blue and Houston Dash respectively within a complex trade. Andi Sullivan is chosen by Washington Spirit in the 2018 NWSL Draft No. 1 pick, with Savannah McCaskill and Quinn (Note: Then known as Rebecca Quinn) following in the top three.
- January 20 – The Netherlands suffers its first defeat since winning the UEFA Euro in an away friendly against Spain.
- January 23 – Phil Neville is appointed as England's head coach and immediately faces a controversy over a number of sexist tweets he wrote in 2012, prompting him to apologize.
- January 28 — Boston Breakers are disestablished following a last minute ownership deal collapse and leave the 2018 NWSL season with nine teams. Mexico wins its first CONCACAF U-20 Championship on penalties over the United States, and Haiti qualifies for the U-20 World Cup for the first time, leaving Canada out.
- January 29 – Brazil and Paraguay take the two last spots for the U-20 World Cup, while Venezuela, including 2017 The Best finalist Deyna Castellanos, fails to qualify.
- January 30 – Rose Lavelle is chosen by Washington Spirit as the first pick in the NWSL Dispersal Draft held due to Boston Breakers's folding.
- January 31 – Brazil extends its complete domination of the U-20 Sudamericano to an 8th title after overwhelming Paraguay in the final game.

=== February ===
- February 1 – Sarah Hagen announces her retirement and joins Orlando City Youth's coaching staff.
- February 2 – Sydney Leroux is traded by Utah Royals in exchange for Orlando Pride's 2019 Draft first round pick.
- February 4 – Canberra United wins the W-League's regular stage five years later with a three-point advantage over Sydney.
- February 8 – FIFA unveils the 2019 World Cup calendar, with France scheduled to play the inaugural match in Paris' Parc des Princes on June 7 and the final being held in Lyon's Parc Olympique Lyonnais on July 7.
- February 10 – Hope Solo ranks second-to-last in the US Soccer presidential election with just 1.4% of the votes; "I am not surprised. From day one we knew it would be very difficult to overthrow the establishment" she comments.
- February 11 – W-League's regular season winner Brisbane Roar is knocked out in the Finals Series by the competition's defending champion, Melbourne City.
- February 14 – Ellie Carpenter, Emily van Egmond and Elise Thorsnes join Portland Thorns FC, Orlando Pride and Utah Royals respectively following the end of their teams' run in the W-League.
- February 18 – Melbourne City defeats Sydney in the W-League's grand final and leaps to the top of the championship's palmares with an unprecedented third title in a row.
- February 19 – Casey Stoney retires at 35 and joins Phil Neville's staff in the England national team.
- February 21 – Manchester City suffers its first defeat in the FA WSL against Birmingham City and loses the lead of the table to Chelsea.
- February 24 – Bayern Munich loses the Bundesliga's second place to Freiburg just as the latter's Laura Benkarth and Lina Magull are announced to join it after the end of the season.
- February 25 – Crystal Dunn leaves Chelsea to join North Carolina Courage back in the NWSL.
- February 26 – The FA renames 2nd-tier Super League 2 and 3rd/4th-tier Premier League as Championship and National League respectively.

=== March ===
- March 7 — The Algarve Cup trophy is shared for the first time as the final has to be cancelled due to weather issues, with the Netherlands and Sweden winning it ex aequo. Spain becomes the first national team to win both the Algarve Cup and the Cyprus Cup in its debut appearances.
- March 8 — FIFPro concedes its 2017 Women's World XI Award to Lindahl, Bronze, Renard, Fischer, Paredes, Marta, Marozsán, Abily, Morgan, Harder and Martens, with Martens, Bronze and Renard receiving the most votes.
- March 9 — Houston Dash is told Christen Press won't join the team two weeks before the start of the 2018 NWSL season, leaving it with no trade after handing Carli Lloyd to Sky Blue.
- March 11 — Kopparbergs/Göteborg players show their disagreement as the team is knocked out of the Svenska Cupen's quarterfinals as per the previous season's ranking following a 1–1 draw against Linköpings, with no overtime nor penalty shootout.
- March 13 — Steffi Jones is sacked by Germany one week after the team ended last the 2018 SheBelieves Cup and Horst Hrubesch takes over as interim coach, becoming the first man to coach the team since Gero Bisanz in the 1996 Olympics.
- March 16 — Gianni Infantino's proposal for a 16-WNT world league with confederation-wide second tiers fails to be approved in the Bogotá FIFA Council meeting.
- March 17 — 22,202 attend Atlético Madrid's first appearance in the new Metropolitano Stadium, where the team draws against Madrid but remains in the lead after Barcelona also fails to defeat Sporting Huelva the following day.
- March 21 — Manchester United announces its intention to launch a women's team and applies for a Championship spot. Ana-Maria Crnogorčević signs for Portland Thorns FC after nearly a decade in the Frauen-Bundesliga. Elise Kellond-Knight is unable to join Seattle Reign as NC Courage exerts a discovery claim, unknown to her.
- March 23 — England reaches an unprecedented second position in the FIFA Ranking surpassing Germany, and France returns to the top 5 as Australia loses two positions.
- March 26 — Christen Press returns to Kopparbergs/Göteborg six years later, with Houston Dash, "disappointed" but "comfortable with the outcome", retaining her NWSL rights.
- March 28 — For the first time two English teams reach the Champions League's semifinals as Chelsea and Manchester City defeat Montpellier and Linköpings in both legs, qualifying along with defending champion Lyon and Wolfsburg, which make it past Barcelona and Slavia Prague.

=== April ===
- April 6 — The 2019 World Cup UEFA qualifiers' Netherlands–Northern Ireland and England–Wales gather the new two top attendances in European qualifiers yet, with crowds of 30,238 and 25,603 respectively; Belgium and the Republic of Ireland also enjoy national record attendances.
- April 8 — Carli Lloyd scores at 35 her 100th goal for the United States in a 6–2 win over Mexico.
- April 13 — Australia, China, Japan and Thailand qualify for the 2018 Asian Cup's semifinals and thus for the 2019 World Cup.
- April 16 — South Korea beats 5–0 the Philippines in the Asian Cup's 5th place play-off to clinch the last AFC ticket for the World Cup.
- April 17 — Australia and defending champion Japan qualify for the Asian Cup final, with Alanna Kennedy avoiding a historic victory for Thailand with an extra-time tier.
- April 18 — Japan wins its second Asian Cup with the same scoreline and opponent as in 2014, a 1–0 win over Australia.
- April 19 — Adidas is criticized for using a model instead of an Argentina player in the unveiling of the team's new kits.
- April 22 — Manchester City puts an end to Lyon's all-wins record through the season with a 0–0 draw in the Champions League semifinals' 1st leg while Wolfsburg approaches the final with an away win over Chelsea.
- April 26 — Switzerland's Martina Voss-Tecklenburg is signed as Germany's new coach following the end of the 2019 World Cup's UEFA qualifiers in November.
- April 29 — Lyon wins Manchester City 1–0 to defend the Champions League title against Wolfsburg in a repeat of the 2013 and 2016 finals.

== International WNT competitions ==
- Inaugural editions are marked in blue. Successful defending champions are marked in yellow.

=== Official ===
Date	Final match venue	Tournament	Champion	Runner up	Third	Fourth
Jan 18 – 28	(Trinidad and Tobago) Couva	CONCACAF U–20 Championship	Mexico ^{(1st)}	United States	Haiti	Canada
Jan 13 – 31	(Brazil) Ambato	U–20 Sudamericano	Brazil ^{(8th)}	Paraguay	Colombia	Venezuela
Mar 7 – 25	(Argentina) San Juan	U–17 Sudamericano	Brazil ^{(3rd)}	Colombia	Uruguay	Venezuela
Apr 6 – 20	(Jordan) Amman	AFC Asian Cup	Japan ^{(2nd)}	Australia	China	Thailand
Apr 4 – 22	(Chile) La Serena	Copa América	Brazil ^{(7th)}	Chile	Argentina	Colombia
May 1 – 13	(Indonesia) Palembang	AFF U–16 Championship	Thailand ^{(2nd)}	Myanmar	Vietnam	Laos
Apr 19 – Jun 12	(United States) Bradenton	CONCACAF U–17 Championship	United States ^{(4th)}	Mexico	Canada	Haiti
Jun 30 – Jul 13	(Indonesia) Palembang	AFF Championship	Thailand ^{(4th)}	Australia U-20	Vietnam	Myanmar
Aug 5 – 24	(France) Vannes	FIFA U–20 World Cup	Japan ^{(1st)}	Spain	England	France
Sep 12 – 22	(South Africa) Ibhayi	COSAFA Championship	South Africa ^{(5th)}	Cameroon	Uganda	Zambia
Sep 28 – Oct 7	(Bhutan) Thimphu	SAFF U–18 Championship	Bangladesh ^{(1st)}	Nepal	India	Bhutan
Oct 4 – 17	(United States) Frisco	CONCACAF Championship	United States ^{(8th)}	Canada	Jamaica	Panama
Oct 25 – Nov 3	(Nepal) Lalitpur	SAFF U–15 Championship	Bangladesh ^{(2nd)}	Pakistan	India	Nepal
Nov 17 – Dec 1	(Ghana) Accra	CAF Cup of Nations	Nigeria ^{(11th)}	South Africa	Cameroon	Mali
Nov 13 – Dec 1	(Uruguay) Montevideo	FIFA U–17 World Cup	Spain ^{(1st)}	Mexico	New Zealand	Canada
Nov 18 – Dec 1	(New Caledonia) Nouméa	OFC Nations Cup	New Zealand ^{(6th)}	Fiji	Papua New Guinea	New Caledonia
Nov 23 – Dec 1	(Uzbekistan) Tashkent	CAFA Championship	Uzbekistan ^{(1st)}	Iran U-23	Tajikistan	Kyrgyzstan

=== Invitational ===
Date	Final match venue	Tournament	Champion	Runner up	Third	Fourth
Jan 19 – 23	(China) Foshan	Four Nations Tournament	China ^{(6th)}	Thailand	Colombia	Vietnam
Feb 27 – Mar 6	(Turkey) Alanya	Turkish Cup	France B	Mexico	Ukraine	Poland
Feb 28 – Mar 7	(Portugal) Parchal	Algarve Cup	Netherlands ^{(1st)} and Sweden ^{(4th)} ^{note 1}		Portugal	Australia
Feb 28 – Mar 7	(Cyprus) Larnaca	Cyprus Cup	Spain ^{(1st)}	Italy	North Korea	Switzerland
Mar 1 – Mar 7	(United States) Orlando	SheBelieves Cup	United States ^{(2nd)}	England	France	Germany
Jun 5 – 10	(France) Salon	Sud Ladies Cup (U-20)	United States ^{(1st)}	France	Germany	Haiti
Jul 26 – Aug 2	(United States) Bridgeview	Tournament of Nations	United States ^{(1st)}	Australia	Brazil	Japan

^{note 1} The final match was cancelled due to weather issues and both teams were awarded the title.

== International club competitions ==
=== Official ===
Date	Final match venue	Tournament	Champion	Runner up	Third	Fourth
22 August 2017 – May 24, 2018	(Ukraine) Kyiv	UEFA Champions League	(France) Lyon ^{(5th)}	(Germany) Wolfsburg	(England) Chelsea and (England) Manchester City	
Sep 24 – 29	Panama City	UNCAF Interclub Championship	(Guatemala) Unifut ^{(1st)}	(Costa Rica) Moravia	(El Salvador) Alianza	(Panama) Atlético Nacional
Nov 18 – Dec 2	(Brazil) Manaus	Copa Libertadores	(Colombia) Atlético Huila ^{(1st)}	(Brazil) Santos	(Brazil) Iranduba	(Chile) Colo-Colo

=== Invitational ===
Date	Final match venue	Tournament	Champion	Runner up	Third	Fourth
Jul 26 – 29	(United States) Miami Gardens	International Champions Cup	(United States) NC Courage ^{(1st)}	(France) Lyon	(England) Manchester City	(France) PSG

== National competitions ==
=== UEFA ===
	National league		National cup		Other	
Country	Competition	Champion	Competition	Champion	Competition	Champion
Albania	Albanian Championship	Vllaznia Shkodër ^{(5th)}	Albanian Cup	Vllaznia Shkodër ^{(5th)}		
Austria	Frauenliga	St. Pölten ^{(4th)}	Ladies Cup	St. Pölten ^{(5th)}		
Belgium	Super League	Anderlecht ^{(5th)}	Belgian Cup	Standard Liège ^{(8th)}		
Belarus	Premier League	Minsk ^{(6th)}	Belarusian Cup	Minsk ^{(7th)}		
Bosnia and Herzegovina	Premier League	Sarajevo ^{(16th)}	BiH Cup	Sarajevo ^{(13th)}		
Bulgaria	Bulgarian Championship	NSA Sofia ^{(14th)}	Bulgarian Cup	NSA Sofia ^{(16th)}		
Croatia	First League	Osijek ^{(22nd)}	Croatian Cup	Split ^{(1st)}		
Cyprus	First Division	Barcelona FA ^{(1st)}	Cypriot Cup	Apollon Limassol ^{(10th)}	Super Cup	Barcelona FA ^{(1st)}
Czech Republic	First Division	Sparta Prague ^{(19th)}	Czech Cup	Sparta Prague ^{(9th)}		
Denmark	Elitedivisionen	Fortuna Hjørring ^{(10th)}	Danish Cup	Brøndby ^{(11th)}		
England	WSL	Chelsea ^{(2nd)}	FA Cup	Chelsea ^{(2nd)}	WSL Cup	Arsenal ^{(5th)}
Estonia	Meistriliiga	Flora Tallinn ^{(1st)}	Estonian Cup	Flora Tallinn ^{(4th)}		
Faroe Islands	1. deild	EB/Streymur/Skála ^{(2nd)}	Faroese Cup	EB/Streymur/Skála ^{(2nd)}		
Finland	Naisten Liiga	PK-35 Vantaa ^{(7th)}				
France	Division 1	Lyon ^{(16th)}	Coupe de France	PSG ^{(2nd)}		
(Georgia (country)) Georgia	Georgian Championship	Martve ^{(3rd)}				
Germany	Bundesliga	Wolfsburg ^{(4th)}	DFB-Pokal	Wolfsburg ^{(5th)}		
Greece	A Division	PAOK ^{(13th)}				
Hungary	Női NB I	MTK Hungária ^{(8th)}	Hungarian Cup	Ferencváros ^{(6th)}		
Iceland	Úrvalsdeild	Breiðablik ^{(17th)}	Icelandic Cup	Breiðablik ^{(12th)}	Super Cup	Breiðablik ^{(10th)}
Iceland					Deildabikar	Þór/KA ^{(2nd)}
Northern Ireland	Women's Premiership	Linfield ^{(3rd)}	Challenge Cup	Glentoran ^{(7th)}		
Republic of Ireland	WNL	Wexford Youths ^{(4th)}	FAI Cup	Wexford Youths ^{(2nd)}	WNL Cup	Peamount United ^{(3rd)}
Israel	Ligat Nashim	Kiryat Gan ^{(2nd)}	Israeli Cup	Ramat HaSharon ^{(1st)}		
Italy	Serie A	Juventus ^{(1st)}	Coppa Italia	Fiorentina ^{(2nd)}	Supercoppa Italiana	Fiorentina ^{(1st)}
Kazakhstan	Kazakhstani Championship	BIIK Kazygurt ^{(12th)}				
Kosovo	Women's League	Mitrovica ^{(1st)}	Kosovo Cup	Mitrovica ^{(1st)}		
Latvia	Latvian League	Rīgas ^{(6th)}				
Lithuania	A Lyga	Gintra Universitet. ^{(17th)}				
Luxembourg	Ligue 1	Jeunesse Junglinst. ^{(6th)}	Luxembourg Cup	Jeunesse Junglinst. ^{(6th)}		
North Macedonia	Macedonian Championship	Dragon ^{(3rd)}	Macedonian Cup	Tiverija ^{(1st)}		
Malta	First Division	Birkirkara ^{(8th)}	Maltese Cup	Birkirkara ^{(14th)}		
Moldova	Top League	Agarista Anenii Noi ^{(1st)}	Moldovan Cup	Agarista Anenii Noi ^{(1st)}		
Montenegro	Montenegrin League	Breznica ^{(3rd)}				
Netherlands	Eredivisie	Ajax ^{(2nd)}	KNVB Cup	Ajax ^{(3rd)}		
Norway	Toppserien	LSK Kvinner ^{(6th)}	Norwegian Cup	LSK Kvinner ^{(4th)}		
Poland	Ekstraliga	Górnik Łęczna ^{(1st)}	Polish Cup	Górnik Łęczna ^{(1st)}		
Portugal	Campeonato Nacional	Sporting CP	Taça de Portugal	Sporting CP ^{(2nd)}	Supertaça	Braga ^{(1st)}
Romania	Liga I	Olimpia Cluj ^{(8th)}	Romanian Cup	Târgovişte ^{(1st)}		
Russia	Russian Championship	Ryazan ^{(4th)}	Russian Cup	Zvezda Perm ^{(6th)}		
Scotland	SWPL	Glasgow City ^{(13th)}	SWF Cup	Hibernian ^{(8th)}	SWPL Cup	Hibernian ^{(6th)}
Serbia	SuperLiga	Spartak Subotica ^{(8th)}	Serbian Cup	Crvena Zvezda ^{(1st)}		
Slovakia	First League	Slovan Bratislava ^{(13th)}	Slovak Cup	Slovan Bratislava ^{(5th)}		
Slovenia	Women's League	Olimpija Ljubljana ^{(2nd)}	Slovenian Cup	Pomurje ^{(8th)}		
Spain	Primera División	Atlético Madrid ^{(2nd)}	Copa de la Reina	Barcelona ^{(6th)}		

=== AFC ===
	National league		National cup		Other	
Country	Competition	Champion	Competition	Champion	Competition	Champion
Australia	W-League	Melbourne City ^{(2nd)}				
