= 2021 Caribbean Club Shield =

2021 CONCACAF Caribbean Club Shield
Tournament details
- Host country: Curaçao
- City: Willemstad
- Dates: Cancelled (originally 23 April – 2 May 2021)
- Teams: 14 (from 14 associations)
- Venues: 2 (in 1 host city)

The 2021 Caribbean Club Shield was originally to be the fourth edition of the Caribbean Club Shield (also known as the CFU Club Shield), the second-tier annual international club football competition in the Caribbean region, held amongst clubs whose football associations are affiliated with the Caribbean Football Union (CFU), a sub-confederation of CONCACAF.

The tournament was originally scheduled to be played in Curaçao between 23 April and 2 May 2021. However, CONCACAF decided in early April to postpone the tournament due to the COVID-19 pandemic in Curaçao. Eventually the tournament was cancelled, and a number of teams originally set to participate in the 2021 CONCACAF Caribbean Club Shield instead participated in the expanded 2021 CONCACAF Caribbean Club Championship.

The winners of the 2021 CONCACAF Caribbean Club Shield, as long as they fulfill the CONCACAF Regional Club Licensing criteria, would originally play against the fourth place team of the 2021 CONCACAF Caribbean Club Championship in a playoff match to determine the final Caribbean spot to the 2021 CONCACAF League.

Robinhood, having won the title in 2019, were the title holders, since the 2020 edition was cancelled due to the COVID-19 pandemic and the title was not awarded, but did not qualify for the tournament.

== Teams ==
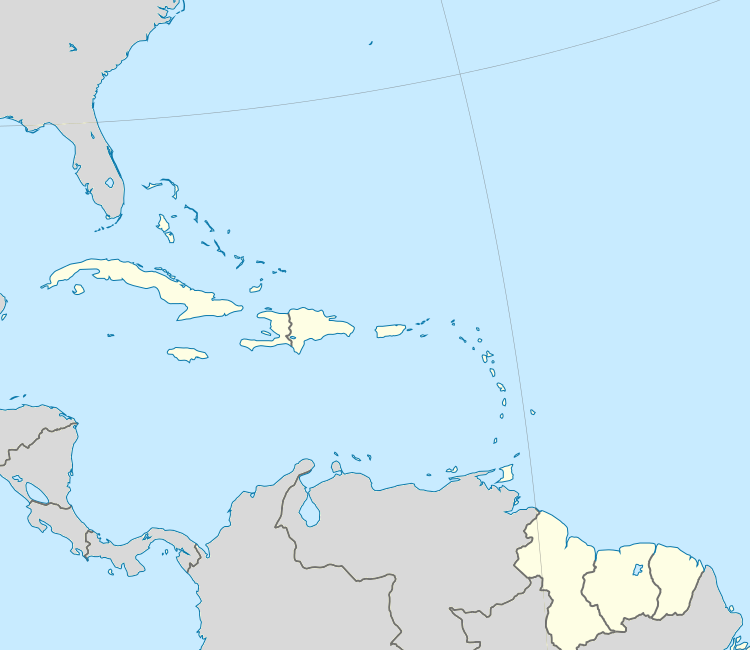
Location of teams of the 2021 CONCACAF Caribbean Club Shield
(H) Host.

Among the 31 CFU member associations, 27 of them were classified as non-professional leagues and each may enter one team in the CONCACAF Caribbean Club Shield. A total of 14 teams (from 14 associations) entered the 2021 CONCACAF Caribbean Club Shield.

After the cancellation of the 2021 CONCACAF Caribbean Club Shield, 9 of the 14 teams instead participated in the expanded 2021 CONCACAF Caribbean Club Championship (marked in bold). Initially, 11 teams would participate, but Racing Club Aruba (Aruba), South East (Dominica) and Platinum FC (Saint Lucia) withdrew, while Hope International (Saint Vincent and the Grenadines) were added.

Association	Team	Qualification method	App. (last)	Previous best (last)
Aruba	Racing Club Aruba	2019–20 Aruban Division di Honor champions	2nd (2020)	Group stage (2020)
Bonaire	**Real Rincon**	2019–20 Bonaire League champions	4th (2020)	Third place (2018)
Curaçao (hosts)	**Scherpenheuvel**	2019–20 Curaçao Promé Divishon champions	1st	Debut
Dominica	South East	2020 Dominica Premier League champions	2nd (2020)	Group stage (2020)
French Guiana	**Olympique de Cayenne**	2019–20 French Guiana Honor Division champions	1st	Debut
Guadeloupe	**Gosier**	2019–20 Guadeloupe Division of Honor champions	1st	Debut
Guyana	Fruta Conquerors	2019 GFF Elite League champions	2nd (2019)	Group stage (2019)
Martinique	**Samaritaine**	2019–20 Martinique Championnat National champions	1st	Debut
Puerto Rico	**Metropolitan**	2019–20 Liga Puerto Rico champions	2nd (2020)	Group stage (2020)
Saint Kitts and Nevis	St. Paul's United	2019–20 SKNFA Premier League champions	1st	Debut
Saint Lucia	Platinum FC	2019 SLFA First Division champions	3rd (2020)	Consolation matches (2019)
Saint Vincent and the Grenadines	**Hope International**	2019–20 SVGFF Premier Division champions	1st	Debut
Sint Maarten	**Flames United**	2020–21 Sint Maarten Senior League champions	1st	Debut
Suriname	**Inter Moengotapoe**	2018–19 SVB Topklasse champions	3rd (2020)	Runners-up (2018)

Associations which did not enter a team

- Anguilla
- Antigua and Barbuda
- Bahamas
- Barbados
- Bermuda
- British Virgin Islands
- Cayman Islands
- Cuba
- Grenada
- Montserrat
- Saint Martin
- Turks and Caicos Islands
- U.S. Virgin Islands

Notes

1. Aruba (ARU): The 2019–20 Aruban Division di Honor was abandoned by the Aruba Football Federation due to the COVID-19 pandemic in Aruba. The season was declared null and void, and no champions were declared.
2. Bonaire (BOE): The 2019–20 Bonaire League was abandoned by the Bonaire Football Federation due to the COVID-19 pandemic in Bonaire. The season was declared null and void, and no champions were declared.
3. French Guiana (GUF): The 2019–20 French Guiana Honor Division was abandoned by the French Football Federation (which governs the Ligue de Football de la Guyane) due to the COVID-19 pandemic in France (which also affects French Guiana). Olympique de Cayenne, which were the leaders at the time of abandonment, were declared champions.
4. Guadeloupe (GLP): The 2019–20 Guadeloupe Division of Honor was abandoned by the French Football Federation (which governs the Guadeloupean League of Football) due to the COVID-19 pandemic in France (which also affects Guadeloupe). Gosier, which were the leaders at the time of abandonment, were declared champions.
5. Guyana (GUY): The 2020 GFF Elite League was not organized by the Guyana Football Federation due to the COVID-19 pandemic in Guyana.
6. Martinique (MTQ): The 2019–20 Martinique Championnat National was abandoned by the French Football Federation (which governs the Ligue de football de la Martinique) due to the COVID-19 pandemic in France (which also affects Martinique). Samaritaine, which were the leaders at the time of abandonment, were declared champions.
7. Puerto Rico (PUR): The 2019–20 Liga Puerto Rico was abandoned by the Puerto Rican Football Federation due to the COVID-19 pandemic in Puerto Rico. The season was declared null and void, and no champions were declared.
8. Saint Lucia (LCA): The 2020 SLFA First Division was abandoned by the Saint Lucia Football Association due to the COVID-19 pandemic in Saint Lucia. The season was declared null and void, and no champions were declared.
9. Suriname (SUR): The 2019–20 SVB Topklasse was abandoned by the Surinamese Football Association due to the COVID-19 pandemic in Suriname. The season was declared null and void, and no champions were declared.

== Venues ==
The matches were originally to be played at the Ergilio Hato Stadium and FFK Stadium in Willemstad.

== Group stage ==
The draw for the group stage was held on 26 February 2021, 11:00 EST (UTC−5), at the CONCACAF Headquarters in Miami, United States. The 14 teams were drawn into four groups: two groups of four teams (Groups A–B) and two groups of three teams (Groups C–D). The team from the host association Curaçao, Scherpenheuvel, were allocated to position A1, while the remaining 13 teams were drawn into the other group positions without any seeding.

The winners of each group would advance to the semi-finals.

Tiebreakers

The ranking of teams in each group is determined as follows (Regulations Article 12.3):

1. Points obtained in all group matches (three points for a win, one for a draw, zero for a loss);
2. Goal difference in all group matches;
3. Number of goals scored in all group matches;
4. Points obtained in the matches played between the teams in question;
5. Goal difference in the matches played between the teams in question;
6. Number of goals scored in the matches played between the teams in question;
7. Fair play points in all group matches (only one deduction could be applied to a player in a single match):
  - Yellow card: −1 points;
  - Indirect red card (second yellow card): −3 points;
  - Direct red card: −4 points;
  - Yellow card and direct red card: −5 points;
8. Drawing of lots.

All times local, AST (UTC−4).

=== Group A ===
Pos	Team	Pld	W	D	L	GF	GA	GD	Pts	Qualification
1	(Curaçao) Scherpenheuvel (H)	0	0	0	0	0	0	0	0	Knockout stage
2	(Sint Maarten) Flames United	0	0	0	0	0	0	0	0	
3	(Bonaire) Real Rincon	0	0	0	0	0	0	0	0	
4	(Saint Lucia) Platinum FC	0	0	0	0	0	0	0	0	

Source: CONCACAF
(H) Hosts
23 April 2021
15:00

Flames United (Sint Maarten)	Cancelled	(Bonaire) Real Rincon

Ergilio Hato Stadium, Willemstad
23 April 2021
20:00

Scherpenheuvel (Curaçao)	Cancelled	(Saint Lucia) Platinum FC

Ergilio Hato Stadium, Willemstad

25 April 2021
15:00

Scherpenheuvel (Curaçao)	Cancelled	(Bonaire) Real Rincon

FFK Stadium, Willemstad
25 April 2021
17:30

Flames United (Sint Maarten)	Cancelled	(Saint Lucia) Platinum FC

FFK Stadium, Willemstad

27 April 2021
20:00

Scherpenheuvel (Curaçao)	Cancelled	(Sint Maarten) Flames United

Ergilio Hato Stadium, Willemstad
27 April 2021
20:00

Real Rincon (Bonaire)	Cancelled	(Saint Lucia) Platinum FC

FFK Stadium, Willemstad

=== Group B ===
Pos	Team	Pld	W	D	L	GF	GA	GD	Pts	Qualification
1	(Guadeloupe) Gosier	0	0	0	0	0	0	0	0	Knockout stage
2	(French Guiana) Olympique de Cayenne	0	0	0	0	0	0	0	0	
3	(Martinique) Samaritaine	0	0	0	0	0	0	0	0	
4	(Dominica) South East	0	0	0	0	0	0	0	0	

Source: CONCACAF
23 April 2021
15:00

Olympique de Cayenne (French Guiana)	Cancelled	(Martinique) Samaritaine

FFK Stadium, Willemstad
23 April 2021
20:00

Gosier (Guadeloupe)	Cancelled	(Dominica) South East

FFK Stadium, Willemstad

25 April 2021
15:00

Gosier (Guadeloupe)	Cancelled	(Martinique) Samaritaine

Ergilio Hato Stadium, Willemstad
25 April 2021
17:30

Olympique de Cayenne (French Guiana)	Cancelled	(Dominica) South East

Ergilio Hato Stadium, Willemstad

27 April 2021
17:30

Gosier (Guadeloupe)	Cancelled	(French Guiana) Olympique de Cayenne

Ergilio Hato Stadium, Willemstad
27 April 2021
17:30

Samaritaine (Martinique)	Cancelled	(Dominica) South East

FFK Stadium, Willemstad

=== Group C ===
Pos	Team	Pld	W	D	L	GF	GA	GD	Pts	Qualification
1	(Saint Vincent and the Grenadines) Hope International	0	0	0	0	0	0	0	0	Knockout stage
2	Racing Club Aruba	0	0	0	0	0	0	0	0	
3	(Guyana) Fruta Conquerors	0	0	0	0	0	0	0	0	

Source: CONCACAF
23 April 2021
17:30

Hope International (Saint Vincent and the Grenadines)	Cancelled	(Guyana) Fruta Conquerors

Ergilio Hato Stadium, Willemstad

25 April 2021
20:00

Hope International (Saint Vincent and the Grenadines)	Cancelled	Racing Club Aruba

Ergilio Hato Stadium, Willemstad

27 April 2021
15:00

Racing Club Aruba	Cancelled	(Guyana) Fruta Conquerors

Ergilio Hato Stadium, Willemstad

=== Group D ===
Pos	Team	Pld	W	D	L	GF	GA	GD	Pts	Qualification
1	(Saint Kitts and Nevis) St. Paul's United	0	0	0	0	0	0	0	0	Knockout stage
2	(Puerto Rico) Metropolitan	0	0	0	0	0	0	0	0	
3	(Suriname) Inter Moengotapoe	0	0	0	0	0	0	0	0	

Source: CONCACAF
23 April 2021
17:30

St. Paul's United (Saint Kitts and Nevis)	Cancelled	(Suriname) Inter Moengotapoe

FFK Stadium, Willemstad

25 April 2021
20:00

St. Paul's United (Saint Kitts and Nevis)	Cancelled	(Puerto Rico) Metropolitan

FFK Stadium, Willemstad

27 April 2021
15:00

Metropolitan (Puerto Rico)	Cancelled	(Suriname) Inter Moengotapoe

FFK Stadium, Willemstad

== Knockout stage ==
In the semi-finals and third place match, a penalty shoot-out would be used to determine the winner if the score was tied after regular time. In the final, extra time would be played if the score was tied after regular time, and a penalty shoot-out would be used to determine the winner If the score was still tied after extra time (Regulations 12.5).

=== Bracket ===
The semi-final matchups would be:

- SF1: Group A Winners vs. Group B Winners
- SF2: Group C Winners vs. Group D Winners

The winners of SF1 and SF2 would play in the final, while the losers of SF1 and SF2 would play in the third place match.

Semi-finals
30 April – Willemstad
Group A Winners
Group B Winners
30 April – Willemstad
Group C Winners
Group D Winners

Final
2 May – Willemstad
Semi-final 1 Winners
Semi-final 2 Winners
Third place match
2 May – Willemstad
Semi-final 1 Losers
Semi-final 2 Losers

=== Semi-finals ===
30 April 2021
17:00

Group C Winners	Cancelled	Group D Winners

FFK Stadium, Willemstad

30 April 2021
20:00

Group A Winners	Cancelled	Group B Winners

FFK Stadium, Willemstad

=== Third place match ===
2 May 2021
17:00

Semi-final 1 Losers	Cancelled	Semi-final 2 Losers

FFK Stadium, Willemstad

=== Final ===
Winners would advance to CONCACAF League playoff against 2021 CONCACAF Caribbean Club Championship fourth-placed team for a place in 2021 CONCACAF League preliminary round, as long as they comply with the minimum CONCACAF Club Licensing requirements for the CONCACAF League.

2 May 2021
20:00

Semi-final 1 Winners	Cancelled	Semi-final 2 Winners

FFK Stadium, Willemstad

== See also ==
- 2021 Caribbean Club Championship
- 2021 CONCACAF League
- 2022 CONCACAF Champions League
