= 2020–21 Guadeloupe Division of Honor =

Guadeloupe Division of Honor
- Season: 2020–21
- Dates: 4 September 2020 – 3 March 2021 (regular season); 26 March – 22 May 2021 (Championship Round)
- Caribbean Club Shield: Gosier
- Coupe de France: Gosier; Jeunesse Évolution

The 2019–20 Guadeloupe Division of Honor was the 70th season of the Guadeloupe Division of Honor, the top division football competition in Guadeloupe. The regular season began on 4 September 2020 and was ended on 3 March 2021. The season culminated with the Championship Round which began on 26 March 2021 and concluded on 22 May 2021.

Defending champions, Gosier, repeated as champions, winning their second Guadeloupean title.
