= 2019–20 French Guiana Régional 1 =

French Guiana Régional 1
- Season: 2019–20
- Dates: 16 August 2019 – 8 March 2020 (Note: The season was scheduled to begin on 16 August 2019 and conclude on 24 May 2020.)
- Champions: Olympique Cayenne
- Caribbean Club Shield: Olympique Cayenne
- Coupe de France: Olympique Cayenne; Le Geldar
- Biggest home win: 5 goals (3 times)
- Biggest away win: 6 goals: KOU 1–7 ETO (17 Aug. 2019)
- Highest scoring: 9 goals: OLY 7–2 STG (6 Mar. 2020)

The 2019–20 French Guiana Régional 1 was the 59th season of the French Guiana Régional 1, the top division football competition in French Guiana. The season began on 16 August 2019, and was scheduled to end on 24 May 2020. Due to the COVID-19 pandemic, the season was suspended on 9 March 2020 after the 15th round of matches.

Olympique Cayenne was declared the champions when the season was abandon in June 2020, giving the club their first French Guianese title.

== League table ==
Table at abandonment:

Pos	Team	Pld	W	D	L	GF	GA	GD	Pts	Qualification or relegation
1	Olympique Cayenne (C)	15	11	3	1	36	15	+21	51	Caribbean Club Shield, Coupe de France
2	Geldar	15	9	3	3	32	14	+18	45	Coupe de France
3	Matoury	14	8	3	3	22	10	+12	41	
4	Grand Santi	15	7	5	3	21	18	+3	41	
5	Etoile Matoury	15	7	3	5	36	23	+13	39	
6	Agouado	14	7	2	5	27	22	+5	37	
7	Oyapock	14	6	4	4	26	20	+6	36	
8	Cayenne	15	6	1	8	19	28	−9	34	
9	Remire	15	3	4	8	15	21	−6	28	
10	Kouroucien	15	4	1	10	18	39	−21	28	
11	Saint-Georges	14	3	1	10	23	39	−16	24	
12	Kourou	15	1	2	12	13	39	−26	20	

Source: RSSSF
(C) Champions
