= Olympique de Cayenne =

- Full name: Olympique de Cayenne
- Founded: 27 November 1927; 97 years ago
- Ground: Stade Georges-Chaumet; Cayenne
- Capacity: 7,000
- Chairman: Carlindo Beauvois
- Manager: Aristide Lemaitre
- League: French Guiana Honor Division
- 2024–25: 8th
- Website: https://olympiquedecayenne.footeo.com/
Home colours	Away colours	Third colours

Olympique de Cayenne is a Guianan football club based in Cayenne. The club competes in the Ligue de Guyane, the top tier of French Guianan football.

== History ==
Olympique de Cayenne was founded on 27 November 1927. The team won the 2019–20 French Guiana Honor Division and earned the right to compete at the 2021 Caribbean Club Championship.

== International competition ==
The following is a list of results for Olympique de Cayenne in international competitions. The club's scores are listed first.

Year	Tournament	Round	Opponent	Home	Away	Agg.
2021	Caribbean Club Championship	Group Stage	(Saint Vincent and the Grenadines) Hope International		1–4	
2021	Caribbean Club Championship	Group Stage	(Haiti) Cavaly		0–5	
2021	Caribbean Club Championship	Group Stage	(Curaçao) Scherpenheuvel		1–3	

== Honours ==
- Ligue de Guyane
  - Champions (1): 2019–20
