= 2019–20 Copa El Salvador =

2019–20 Copa El Salvador Renamed as Copa INDES
Tournament details
- Country: El Salvador
- Teams: 36

Final positions
- Champions: TBD
- Runners-up: TBD

Tournament statistics
- Matches played: games
- Top goal scorer: (El Salvador) TBD (0 goals each)

The Copa INDES 2019-20 due to sponsorship reason is the seventh staging of the Copa El Salvador football tournament and the third straight edition played since being brought back since its hiatus.

This tournament will be first to be run Instituto Nacional de los Deportes (INDES), who will be funding and organising the prize money, games and various important functions.

This tournament will start September 2020.

== Participants ==
This tournament will feature all the clubs from the top flight Primera División, 12 from the Segunda División, and 12 from the Tercera División.
