= 2019–20 Guadeloupe Division of Honor =

Guadeloupe Division of Honor
- Season: 2019–20
- Caribbean Club Shield: Gosier
- Coupe de France: Gosier; Jeunesse Évolution

The 2019–20 Guadeloupe Division of Honor was the 69th season of the Guadeloupe Division of Honor, the top division football competition in Guadeloupe. The season began on 24 August 2019 and was scheduled to end on 22 May 2020. The season prematurely ended on 8 March 2020 due to ongoing concerns surrounding the COVID-19 pandemic.

The season was declared abandon in July 2020, and Gosier were deemed the Guadeloupean champions.

== League table ==
4 points for a win, 2 points for a draw, 1 point for a defeat.
Table at abandonment:

Pos	Team	Pld	W	D	L	GF	GA	GD	Pts	Qualification or relegation
1	AS Gosier	16	13	2	1	35	18	+17	57	Caribbean Club Shield
2	Jeunesse	17	9	4	4	22	14	+8	48	
3	Baie-Mahault	16	8	5	3	29	19	+10	45	
4	Moulien	15	7	4	4	20	13	+7	40	
5	USR	16	6	6	4	24	19	+5	40	
6	Amical Club	17	6	5	6	17	20	−3	40	
7	Phare	17	6	3	8	27	28	−1	38	
8	Solidarité-Scolaire	16	6	3	7	22	20	+2	37	
9	JSVH	15	5	5	5	17	18	−1	35	
10	La Gauloise	16	4	6	6	18	19	−1	34	
11	Arsenal	16	3	6	7	20	23	−3	31	
12	Stade Lamentinois	16	4	2	10	17	29	−12	30	Relegated to Honorary Promotion Championship
13	Racing Club de Basse-Terre	15	4	2	9	14	29	−15	29	Relegated to Honorary Promotion Championship
14	Siroco Les Abymes	16	2	5	9	16	29	−13	27	Relegated to Honorary Promotion Championship

Source: RSSSF
