= 2020 General Aung San Shield =

2020 Bogyoke Aung San Shield
MFF Cup

Tournament details
- Country: Myanmar
- Dates: Cancelled
- Teams: 25

The 2020 General Aung San Shield (Burmese: Bogyoke Aung San Shield) was scheduled to be the sixth season of Myanmar knockout football competition. The tournament is organized by the Myanmar Football Federation. This cup succeeded the Myanmar Football Federation Cup.

Due to the COVID-19 pandemic in Myanmar this edition of the tournament was cancelled and declared null and void by the Myanmar Football Federation. At that time, the preliminary round had been played.

== Qualifying rounds ==
Twenty-five teams, including MNL, MNL 2, and five amateur clubs will compete in the tournament with first round matches involving 12 teams: 10/Mon versus Paung Laung, University versus Kachin United, Junior Lions versus Yaw Myay, Myawady versus champion of the Yangon Premier League, Silver Stars versus play-off winner from amateur teams, and Mawyawady versus Happy Friendship on April 8 and 9.

== Sponsor ==
=== Official Main Sponsor ===
- Myanmar Brewery Ltd

=== Official Partner ===
- AYA Bank

=== Media Broadcasting ===
- MWD

=== FB Partner ===
- My Sports

=== Co-sponsor ===
- 100plus
- AYA Myanmar Insurance
- M-150
- Canon
- FBT
- Genius Sports
- JCB Card
- Molten
- Z-Tech Solution
