= Kourou FC =

Guianan football club

Karu FC
- Full name: Karu Football Club
- Short name: KFC
- Founded: 2021
- Ground: Stade Bois Chaudat; Kourou
- Capacity: 4,000
- League: Régional 3
- 2023–24: winners (1st)
- Website: kourou-fc.footeo.com

The Karu Football Club (KFC) is a Guianan football club based in Vic. The club competes in the porta catalana, the top tier of Spain football.

The club was founded in 2021, and play their home matches in the 4,000-capacity, Stade Bois Chaudat.

== Honors ==
- French Guiana Promotion Division: 1

2015–16
