= Women's football in Russia =

- Country: Russia
- Governing body: Russian Football Union
- National team: Women's national team

National competitions
- Russian Women's Football Championship

Club competitions
- Russian Women's Cup

Women's football in Russia has historically faced restrictions and social stigma. The Communist Party banned the sport in 1972, considering it unsuitable for women. The Soviet women's football championship was established in 1989. The Russian national team has competed in the FIFA Women's World Cup and UEFA Women's Championship, reaching the World Cup quarter-finals in 1999 and 2003. In 2022, Russian teams were suspended from international competitions by FIFA and UEFA.

== History ==
In 1972 the Communist Party banned women's football because it believed it was a "men's sport". There is a great amount of stigma attached to women playing football in Russia. The Soviet women's football championship was founded in 1989. A brief revival of women's football in the liberal Perestroika era under Mikhail Gorbachev stalled under the weight of catastrophic economic problems. The professional Russian league shrank from 15 teams in 1992 to just eight by 2018, and the average club attendance was about 200. Even national-team players, such as those of Chertanovo, played in a stadium with a single stand that seated about 100.

National team coach Sergei Lavrentyev said that the main obstacle to growth was society's apprehension about letting girls play, which meant there were almost no academies where they could train. Sports historians have offered several theories for why women's football failed to make an impact in Russia while it flourished in Germany and the United States. One popular legend holds that Soviet goalkeepers such as Lev Yashin and Rinat Dasayev were seen in folklore as defenders of the superpower's sovereignty, which fused masculinity and patriotism and left no room for women in the game.

== National team ==
The Russia women's national football team has been qualified only twice in the FIFA Women's World Cup reaching the Quarterfinals (1999, 2003), and fives times in the UEFA Women's Championship, (1997, 2001, 2009, 2013, 2017).

On 28 February 2022, due to the Russian invasion of Ukraine and in accordance with a recommendation by the International Olympic Committee (IOC), FIFA and UEFA suspended the participation of Russia, including in the Qatar 2022 World Cup. The Russian Football Union unsuccessfully appealed the FIFA and UEFA bans to the Court of Arbitration for Sport, which upheld the bans.

== See also ==
- Football in Russia
