= Women's football in Finland =

Overview of Finland in football

Women's Football in Finland
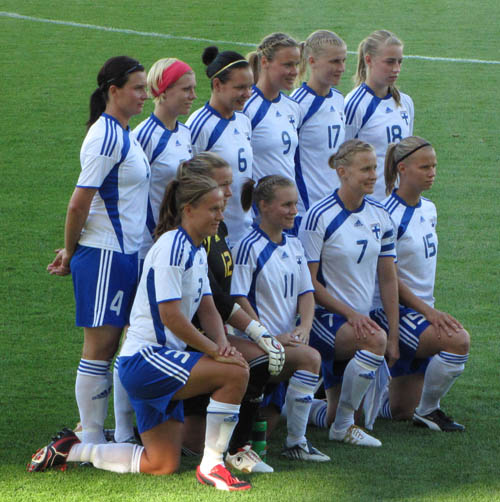
- Country: Finland
- Governing body: Football Association of Finland
- National team: Women's national team

National competitions
- FIFA Women's World Cup; UEFA Women's Championship

Club competitions
- League: Kansallinen Liiga; Naisten Ykkönen; Naisten Kakkonen; Cups: Finnish Women's Cup

International competitions
- UEFA Women's Champions League

Women's football in Finland is growing in popularity.

== Club football ==
Kansallinen Liiga is the highest tier of women's football in Finland.

== International team ==
Since the 21st century, Finland has seen an upsurge of success with the national team qualifying for the UEFA Women's Championship four times and their greatest achievement was reaching the semi-finals of UEFA Women's Euro 2005.
