= Women's football in Austria =

Overview of Austria in football

Women's Football in Austria
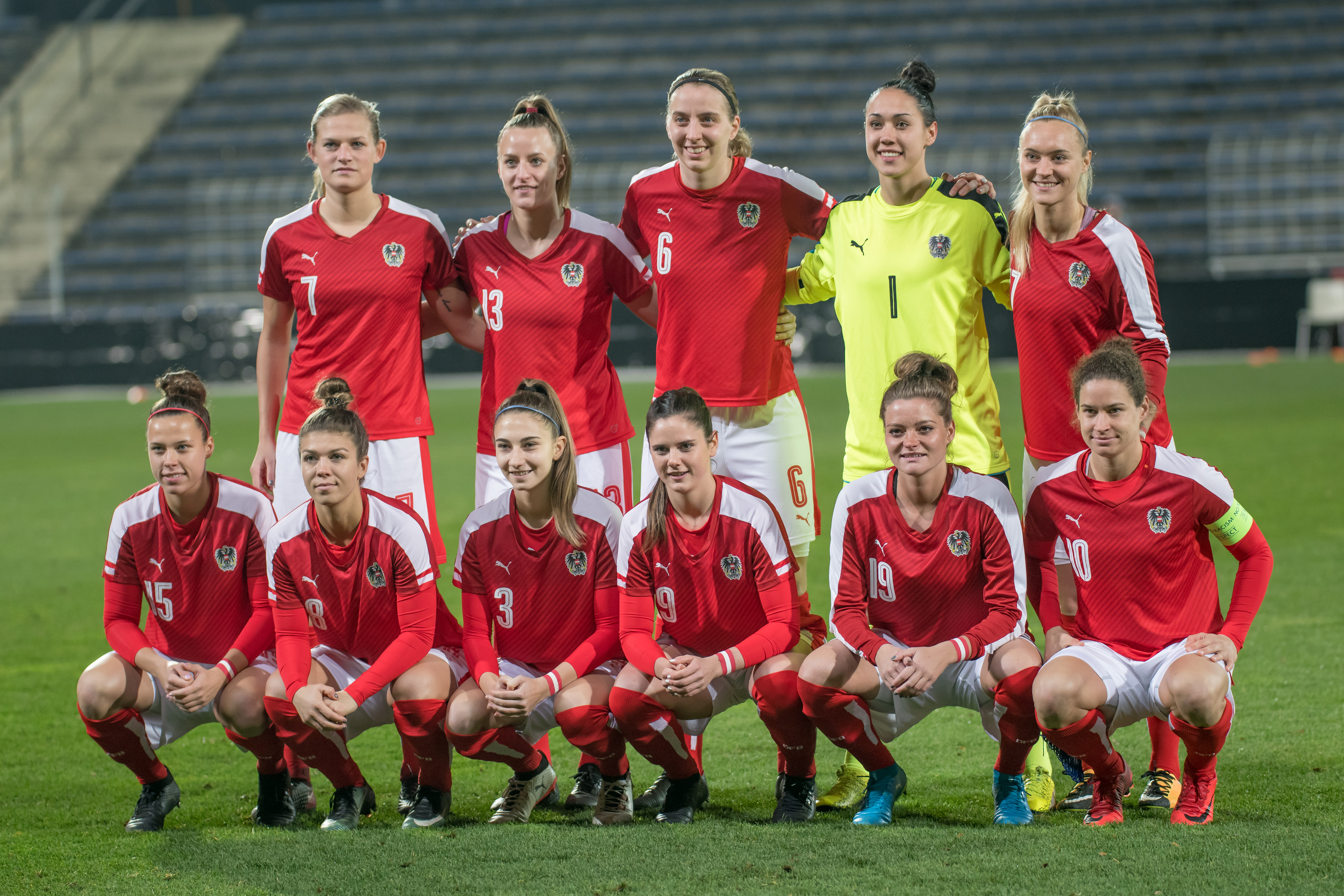
- Austria Women's National team in November 2017
- Country: Austria
- Governing body: Austrian Football Association
- National team: Women's national team

National competitions
- FIFA Women's World Cup; UEFA Women's Championship

Club competitions
- League: ÖFB-Frauenliga; 2. Frauenliga; Cups: ÖFB Frauen Cup

International competitions
- UEFA Women's Champions League

Women's football in Austria is growing in popularity.

== History ==
In 1936, a Viennese man named Karl Lutz sued for divorce from his wife Marie, claiming that she had been neglecting her household duties because of her interest in football. The Daily Express quoted Marie Lutz as responding that "all women would prefer a good game of football to their husband's quarrelsome company."

== Club football ==
ÖFB-Frauenliga is the highest tier of women's football in Austria.

== International team ==
Since the 21st Century Austria has seen an upsurge of success with the national team qualifying for the UEFA Women's Championship two times and their greatest achievement was reaching the semi finals of UEFA Women's Euro 2017.
