= AS Gosier =

- Full name: Association Sportive Gosier
- Nickname: Les requins
- Ground: Stade Roger Zami, Le Gosier, Guadeloupe
- Chairman: Antoine Toussaint
- Manager: Didier Leborgne; Ruddy Blirando
- League: Guadeloupe Division of Honor

AS Gosier is a professional football club of Guadeloupe, based in the town of Le Gosier.

They play in the Guadeloupe first division, the Guadeloupe Championnat National. In 2020, the team won their first league title. They won their second in 2021.

== Achievements ==
- Guadeloupe Division of Honour (2): 2019–20, 2020–21
- Coupe de Guadeloupe (1): 2024
