= Women's football in Belgium =

- Country: Belgium
- Governing body: Belgian Football Association
- National team: Women's national team

National competitions
- Super League Vrouwenvoetbal

Club competitions
- Belgian Women's Cup

International competitions
- Champions League; FIFA Women's World Cup (national team); European Championship (national team)

Women's football in Belgium is recorded at least as early as 1926, when the Belgium women's national football team played an annual series of matches against France, from 1926 until 1932. These were organized with the FSFSF. Belgium's only win was in the 1927 match in Paris, 2–1. The last game in this series was played in Brussels on 3 April 1932 and ended 0–0.

== Club competitions ==
League football was first played between 1924 and 1934, with the Atalante de Jette club winning five of the eleven tournaments, including the last four.

League football was resurrected in 1972 with the formation of the First Division. Standard Liège won 15 championships, with Eendracht Aalst and Sint-Truidense winning five each. The 2012/13 season saw the first Division being replaced by the short lived BeNe League which was a joint venture with teams from The Netherlands. During the first two of its three seasons Liege was runners up, whilst they triumphed in the 2014/15 season. Currently the Super League Vrouwenvoetbal is the 8 club top-tier league of Women's football in Belgium. Standard Liège won the first two championships, with Anderlecht having won the following four. Below the top league sit the nationwide, 14 team First and Second Divisions. The Third Division, although nationwide, is split into two groups. The lower tiers are regionalised.

The national cup competition, the Belgian Women's Cup has run annually since 1977. Anderlecht (10 wins), Liège (8) and K.F.C. Rapide Wezemaal (6) are the most successful clubs to 2020.

Each season since the inception of the UEFA Women's Cup (now the UEFA Women's Champions League) in 2001 the league champions have taken part in European club competition. As of 2021/22 the sole Belgian team to reach the quarter-final stage was Rapide Wezemaal in 2007/08

== National football team ==
The Belgium women's national football team was founded and played their first match in the 1976. Their current home ground is Den Dreef, a 10,000-seat stadium in Leuven. They have attempted to qualify for each World Cup since its inception in 1991, but have yet to succeed. Their best result came in 2019 where they reached the play off stage. They have entered qualification for each of the European Championships, making their first finals in 2017 and then repeated the feat for 2022. The team reached their highest position in the FIFA rankings in December 2019 (17th) and their lowest in November 2010 (35th). Their most capped player is Janice Cayman and hit their highest scorer is Tessa Wullaert, both of whom are currently (November 2021) active players.

They also have teams at Under-21, U-19, U-17, U-16, and U-15 levels.

== See also ==
- Football in Belgium
