= 2019–20 Aruban Division di Honor =

Aruban Division di Honor
- Season: 2019–20
- Champions: No champion
- Relegated: No relegation
- Matches: 55
- Goals: 230 (4.18 per match)
- Biggest home win: Nacional 12 -0 United (2 November 2019)
- Biggest away win: United 0-7 Dakota (6 March 2020)
- Highest scoring: Nacional 12 -0 United (2 November 2019)
- Longest winning run: 6 games (RCA)
- Longest unbeaten run: 11 games (RCA)
- Longest winless run: 11 games (United)
- Longest losing run: 11 games (United)

The 2019–20 Aruban Division di Honor was the 59th season of the Division di Honor, the top division football competition in Aruba. The season began on 22 September 2019.

On 13 March 2020, the season was suspended due to the coronavirus pandemic. On 17 June, the league voted to abandon the remainder of the season.

== Changes from 2018–19 season ==
Caiquetio and River Plate were relegated to the Division Uno and replaced by the promoted Caravel and United.

== Teams ==
Locations of the 2019-20 Division di Honor teams

There are 10 clubs that competed this season.

Team	Home city	Home ground
Brazil Juniors	Brasil	Brazil Juniors Stadium
Britannia	Piedra Plat	Compleho Deportivo Franklyn Bareño
Bubali	Noord	Bubali Stadium
Caravel	Santa Cruz/Angochi	Caravel Stadium
Dakota	Oranjestad	Trinidad Stadium
Estrella	Santa Cruz	Trinidad Stadium
La Fama	Savaneta	La Fama Stadium
Nacional	Palm Beach/Noord	Nacional Stadium
RCA	Oranjestad	Trinidad Stadium
United	Noord	Compleho Deportivo Frans Figaroa

== Regular season ==
Pos	Team	Pld	W	D	L	GF	GA	GD	Pts	Qualification or relegation
1	RCA	11	10	1	0	23	1	+22	31	Advance to Caya 4
2	Dakota	11	9	1	1	32	10	+22	28	Advance to Caya 4
3	Nacional	11	5	3	3	42	13	+29	18	Advance to Caya 4
4	Bubali	11	4	3	4	24	21	+3	15	Advance to Caya 4
5	Estrella	11	4	3	4	22	20	+2	15	
6	Caravel	11	4	1	6	15	21	−6	13	
7	Brazil Juniors	11	4	1	6	24	37	−13	13	
8	Britannia	11	3	3	5	19	20	−1	12	Relegation playoffs
9	La Fama	11	3	2	6	22	21	+1	11	Relegation playoffs
10	United	11	0	0	11	7	66	−59	0	Relegated to Division Uno

Updated to match(es) played on 9 March 2020. Source: Soccerway

== Results ==
Home \ Away	BJR	BRI	BUB	CAR	DAK	EST	LAF	NAC	RCA	UTD
Brazil Juniors	—	2–6	1–3	3–1		3–2	5–2		0–3	
Britannia		—	1–3		0–1	2–2	2–1	0–2		
Bubali		3–3	—	2–0		1–2	2–4	2–2		
Caravel	1–1	1–0		—	1–2	2–5		2–0	0–1	
Dakota	6–1		3–1		—			3–2	1–2	4–1
Estrella	2–1				0–2	—	2–3	3–3		3–1
La Fama				0–1	2–3	1–1	—	0–0	0–2	9–0
Nacional	10–0	4–1		7–1				—	0–1	12–0
RCA		0–0				1–0	3–0		—	6–0
United	1–7	1–4	3–7	0–5	0–7				0–2	—

Updated to match(es) played on 9 March 2020. Source: Soccerway
Legend: Blue = home team win; Yellow = draw; Red = away team win.
