= Women's football in Israel =

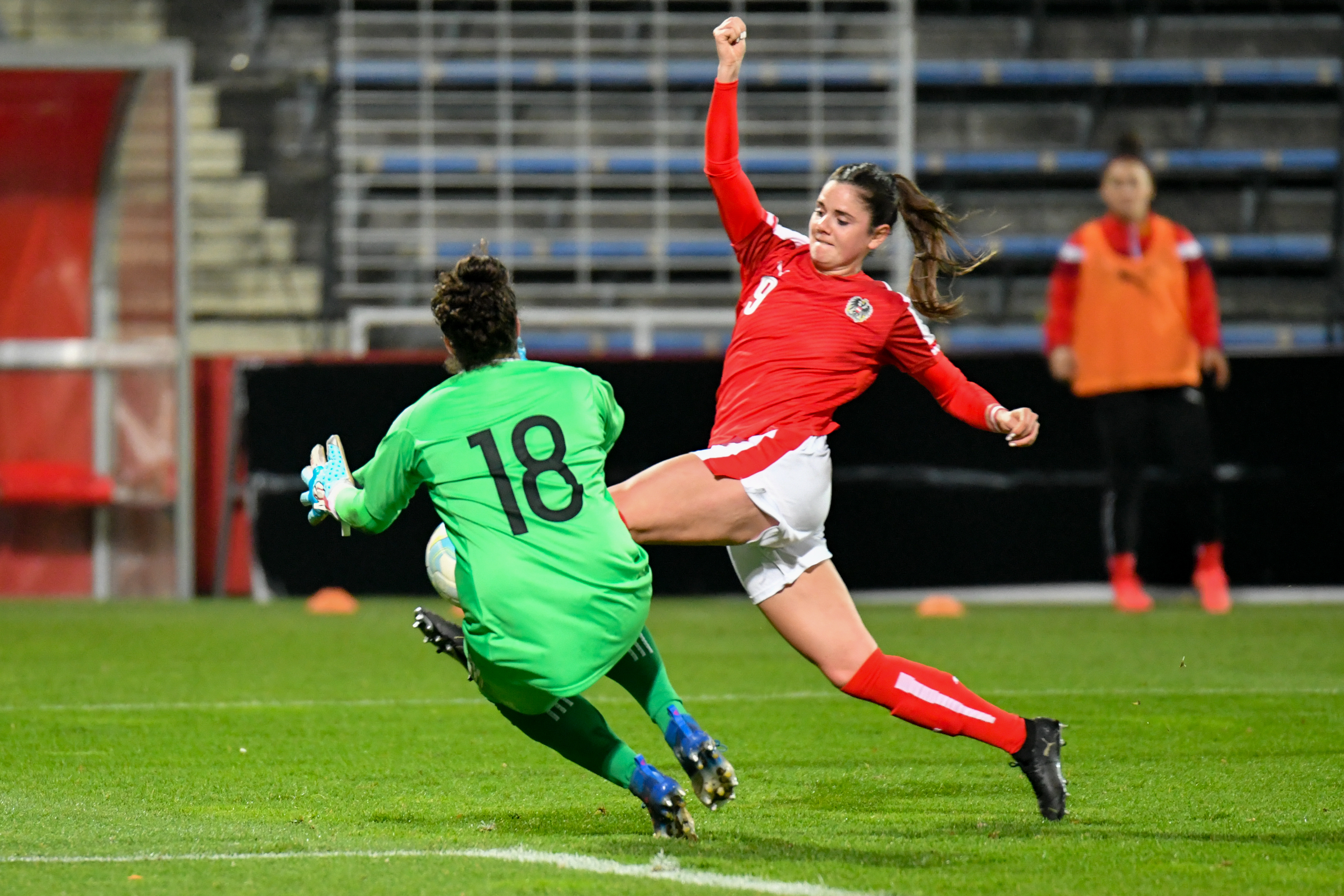
- FIFA Women's World Cup 2019 Qualifying Round Austria vs. Israel November 23, 2017 BSFZ-Arena Maria Enzersdorf
- Country: Israel
- Governing body: Israel Football Association
- National team: Women's national team

National competitions
- Israeli Women's Cup

Club competitions
- Ligat Nashim

International competitions
- FIFA Women's World Cup; UEFA Women's Championship

Women's football in Israel is gaining popularity but female players often play abroad to improve their skills.

Some of the barriers that prevent association football from growing include prejudice against women for playing association football. Other main causes are lack of budgets, sponsors and proper budget management. As in any competitive sports field, lack of transparency is always a big barrier on its own and creates a hidden competition among the athletes.

Israeli women's football suffers from years of neglect from the authorities and was always the last in terms of priority. The main effort to improve and establish a future for this sport was in the hand of the managers and private people that usually were struggling alone to collect budget to create youth teams in the different clubs in order to create a future generation.

The Israel Football Association (IFA) is the governing body of football in the State of Israel. All professional football clubs must be members, and hundreds of semi-professional and amateur clubs also belong.

In 2019, the state announced that it would grant women's association football the same funding it grants men.

== See also ==
- Football in Israel
- Israel women's national football team
