= Women's football in Poland =

Overview of Poland in football

Women's Football in Poland
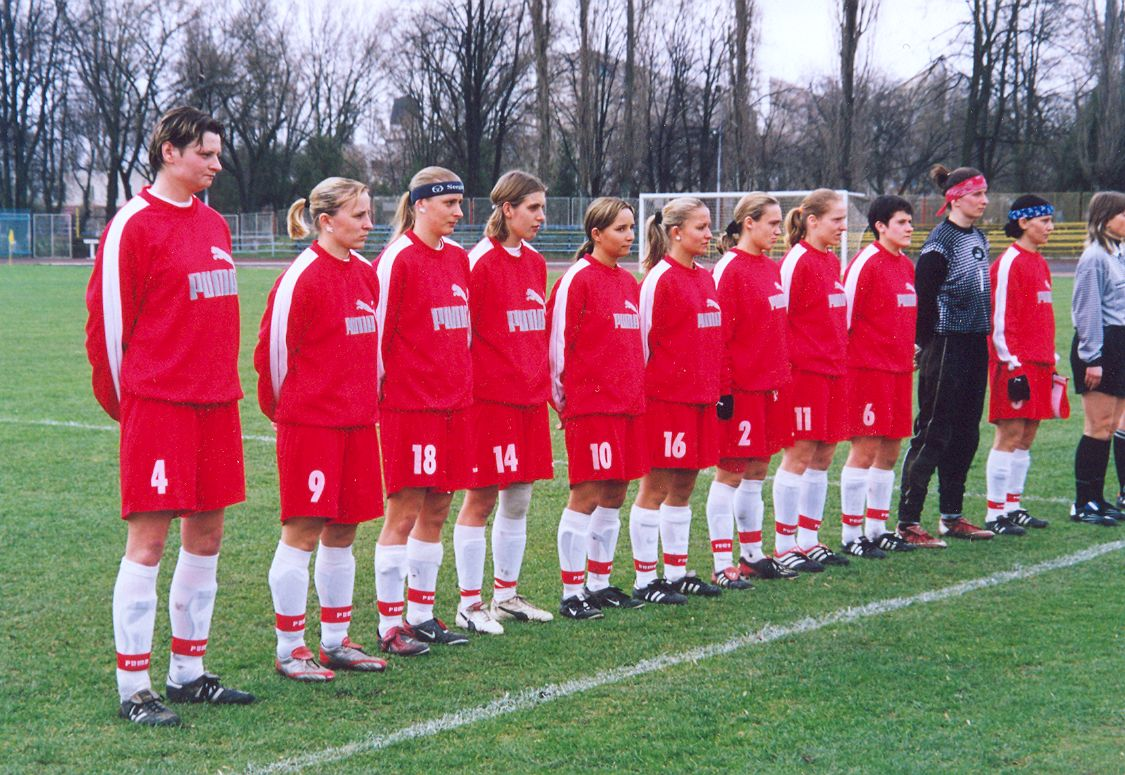
- Poland's national team in 2004
- Country: Poland
- Governing body: Polish Football Association
- National team(s): Women's national team

National competitions
- FIFA Women's World Cup; UEFA Women's Championship

Club competitions
- League: Ekstraliga; I liga II liga Cups: Polish Cup

International competitions
- UEFA Women's Champions League

Women's football in Poland is growing in popularity. The first women to play football in Poland was in the 1920s.

== Club Football ==
Ekstraliga is Poland's highest tier of women's football.

== International Team ==
Since the 21st Century, Poland has seen an upsurge of success, with the national team significantly improving. The women's team has not yet participated in a final phase of the World Cup. In 2024 Poland qualified for the European Championship.
