= National cup =

Sports tournament type

A national cup (also known as association cup) is a type of domestic cup, particularly common in association football. This cup is notable for its participation by professional and amateur teams from many levels of a country's league system. The structure of the competition varies but is usually a knockout format and is typically organized by the country's governing body for the sport (football association). The oldest national cup is England's FA Cup, first played in 1871.

== Format ==
The format of national cups vary from country to country but they usually share many characteristics. The tournament is typically a knockout format where matchups can be played as a single match or a two-legged tie. Teams may enter the tournament in different rounds depending on their league rank. Lower ranked teams would enter in earlier rounds or in a qualifier for the main tournament. A national cup will be played over several months and runs concurrently with the league season. The winner of a national cup may qualify to a super cup or a continental competition.

== List of men's national cups in association football in Africa ==
Current
| Country | National Cup |
|---|---|
| Algeria | Algerian Cup |
| Angola | Taça de Angola |
| Benin | Benin Cup |
| Botswana | Botswana FA Challenge Cup |
| Burkina Faso | Coupe du Faso |
| Burundi | Burundian Cup |
| Cameroon | Cameroonian Cup |
| Cape Verde | Taça Nacional de Cabo Verde |
| Central African Republic | Central African Republic Coupe Nationale |
| Chad | Chad Cup |
| Comoros | Comoros Cup |
| Congo | Coupe du Congo (Republic of Congo) |
| Djibouti | Djibouti Cup |
| DR Congo | Coupe du Congo (DR Congo) |
| Egypt | Egypt Cup |
| Equatorial Guinea | Equatoguinean Cup |
| Eritrea | Eritrean Cup |
| Eswatini | Swazi Cup |
| Ethiopia | Ethiopian Cup |
| Gabon | Coupe du Gabon Interclubs |
| Gambia | Gambian Cup |
| Ghana | Ghana FA Cup |
| Guinea | Guinée Coupe Nationale |
| Guinea-Bissau | Taça Nacional da Guiné Bissau |
| Ivory Coast | Coupe de Côte d'Ivoire |
| Kenya | FKF President's Cup |
| Lesotho | Lesotho Independence Cup |
| Liberia | Liberian FA Cup |
| Libya | Libyan Cup |
| Madagascar | Coupe de Madagascar |
| Malawi | FDH Bank Knockout Cup |
| Mali | Malian Cup |
| Mauritania | Mauritanian President's Cup |
| Mauritius | Mauritian Cup |
| Morocco | Moroccan Throne Cup |
| Mozambique | Taça de Moçambique |
| Namibia | Namibia FA Cup |
| Niger | Niger Cup |
| Nigeria | Nigeria Federation Cup |
| Réunion | Coupe de la Réunion |
| Rwanda | Rwandan Cup |
| São Tomé and Príncipe | Taça Nacional de São Tomé e Príncipe |
| Senegal | Senegal FA Cup |
| Seychelles | Seychelles FA Cup |
| Sierra Leone | Sierra Leonean FA Cup |
| Somalia | Somalia Cup |
| South Africa | Nedbank Cup |
| South Sudan | South Sudan National Cup |
| Sudan | Sudan Cup |
| Tanzania | Tanzania FA Cup |
| Togo | Coupe du Togo |
| Tunisia | Tunisian Cup |
| Uganda | Uganda Cup |
| Zanzibar | Zanzibari Cup |
| Zimbabwe | Cup of Zimbabwe |

Defunct
| Country | National Cup |
|---|---|
| Zambia | Zambian Cup |

== List of men's national cups in association football in the Americas ==
CONMEBOL
| Country | National Cup |
|---|---|
| Argentina | Copa Argentina |
| Bolivia | Copa Bolivia |
| Brazil | Copa do Brasil |
| Chile | Copa Chile |
| Colombia | Copa Colombia |
| Ecuador | Copa Ecuador |
| Paraguay | Copa Paraguay |
| Peru | Copa de la Liga |
| Uruguay | Copa Uruguay |
| Venezuela | Copa Venezuela |

CONCACAF
| Association / Country | Main National Knockout Cup |
|---|---|
| Anguilla | AFA President's Cup |
| Antigua and Barbuda | Antigua and Barbuda FA Cup |
| Aruba | Copa Betico Croes |
| Bahamas | Bahamas President's Cup |
| Barbados | Barbados FA Cup |
| Belize | None currently active |
| Bermuda | Bermuda FA Cup |
| Bonaire | Kopa MCB |
| British Virgin Islands | BVIFA Presidents Cup |
| Canada | Canadian Championship |
| Cayman Islands | Cayman Islands FA Cup |
| Costa Rica | Costa Rican Cup |
| Cuba | None currently active |
| Curaçao | None currently active |
| Dominica | None currently active |
| Dominican Republic | Copa Dominicana de Fútbol |
| El Salvador | Copa Presidente |
| French Guiana | Coupe de Guyane |
| Grenada | GFA Cup |
| Guadeloupe | Coupe de Guadeloupe |
| Guyana | Guyana Mayors Cup |
| Haiti | Coupe d'Haïti |
| Jamaica | JFF Champions Cup |
| Martinique | Coupe de la Martinique |
| Montserrat | None currently active |
| Nicaragua | Copa Primera |
| Panama | Copa Panamá |
| Saint Kitts and Nevis | Saint Kitts and Nevis National Cup |
| Saint Lucia | Saint Lucia FA Cup |
| Saint Martin | None currently active |
| Saint Vincent and the Grenadines | None currently active |
| Sint Maarten | None currently active |
| Suriname | Beker Van Suriname |
| Trinidad and Tobago | Trinidad and Tobago FA Trophy |
| Turks and Caicos Islands | Turks and Caicos FA Cup |
| United States | U.S. Open Cup |
| U.S. Virgin Islands | None currently active |

Defunct
| Country | National Cup |
|---|---|
| Guatemala | Copa de Guatemala |
| Honduras | Honduran Cup |
| Mexico | Copa MX |
| Puerto Rico | Copa Luis Villarejo |

== List of men's national cups in association football in Asia ==
ASEAN Football Federation (AFF)
| Association / Country | Main National Knockout Cup |
|---|---|
| Australia | Australia Cup |
| Brunei | Brunei FA Cup |
| Cambodia | Hun Sen Cup |
| Timor-Leste | Taça 12 de Novembro |
| Indonesia | Piala Indonesia |
| Laos | Lao FF Cup |
| Malaysia | Malaysia FA Cup |
| Myanmar | Myanmar National League Cup |
| Philippines | Copa Paulino Alcantara |
| Singapore | Singapore Cup |
| Thailand | Thai FA Cup |
| Vietnam | Vietnamese Cup |

Central Asian Football Association (CAFA)
| Association / Country | Main National Knockout Cup |
|---|---|
| Afghanistan | None currently active |
| Iran | Hazfi Cup |
| Kyrgyzstan | Kyrgyzstan Cup |
| Tajikistan | Tajikistan Cup |
| Turkmenistan | Turkmenistan Cup |
| Uzbekistan | Uzbekistan Cup |

East Asian Football Federation (EAFF)
| Association / Country | Main National Knockout Cup |
|---|---|
| China | Chinese FA Cup |
| Chinese Taipei | CTFA Cup |
| Guam | GFA Cup |
| Hong Kong | Hong Kong FA Cup |
| Japan | Emperor's Cup |
| Macau | Macau FA Cup |
| Mongolia | Mongolia Cup |
| North Korea | Hwaebul Cup |
| Northern Mariana Islands | NMIFA Cup |
| South Korea | Korea Cup |

South Asian Football Federation (SAFF)
| Association / Country | Main National Knockout Cup |
|---|---|
| Bangladesh | Federation Cup |
| Bhutan | Bhutan National Cup |
| India | Super Cup |
| Maldives | Maldives FA Cup |
| Nepal | No single current national cup is clearly established |
| Pakistan | National Challenge Cup |
| Sri Lanka | Sri Lanka FA Cup |

West Asian Football Federation (WAFF)
| Association / Country | Main National Knockout Cup |
|---|---|
| Bahrain | King's Cup |
| Iraq | Iraq FA Cup |
| Jordan | Jordan FA Cup |
| Kuwait | Emir Cup |
| Lebanon | Lebanese FA Cup |
| Oman | Sultan Qaboos Cup |
| Palestine | Palestine Cup |
| Qatar | Amir Cup |
| Saudi Arabia | King's Cup |
| Syria | Syrian Cup |
| United Arab Emirates | President's Cup |
| Yemen | Republic Cup |

== List of men's national cups in association football in Europe ==
Current
| Country | National Cup |
|---|---|
| Albania | Albanian Cup |
| Andorra | Copa Constitució |
| Armenia | Armenian Cup |
| Austria | Austrian Cup |
| Azerbaijan | Azerbaijan Cup |
| Belarus | Belarusian Cup |
| Belgium | Belgian Cup |
| Bosnia and Herzegovina | Bosnia and Herzegovina Football Cup |
| Bulgaria | Bulgarian Cup |
| Croatia | Croatian Football Cup |
| Cyprus | Cypriot Cup |
| Czech Republic | Czech Cup |
| Denmark | Danish Cup |
| England | FA Cup |
| Estonia | Estonian Cup |
| Faroe Islands | Faroe Islands Cup |
| Finland | Finnish Cup |
| France | Coupe de France |
| Georgia | Georgian Cup |
| Germany | DFB-Pokal |
| Gibraltar | Rock Cup |
| Greece | Greek Football Cup |
| Hungary | Magyar Kupa |
| Iceland | Icelandic Men's Football Cup |
| Israel | Israel State Cup |
| Italy | Coppa Italia |
| Kazakhstan | Kazakhstan Cup |
| Kosovo | Kosovar Cup |
| Latvia | Latvian Football Cup |
| Liechtenstein | Liechtenstein Football Cup |
| Lithuania | Lithuanian Football Cup |
| Luxembourg | Luxembourg Cup |
| Malta | Maltese FA Trophy |
| Moldova | Cupa Moldovei |
| Montenegro | Montenegrin Cup |
| Netherlands | KNVB Cup |
| North Macedonia | Macedonian Football Cup |
| Northern Ireland | Irish Cup |
| Norway | Norwegian Football Cup |
| Poland | Polish Cup |
| Portugal | Taça de Portugal |
| Republic of Ireland | FAI Cup |
| Romania | Cupa României |
| Russia | Russian Cup (football) |
| San Marino | Coppa Titano |
| Scotland | Scottish Cup |
| Serbia | Serbian Cup |
| Slovakia | Slovak Cup |
| Slovenia | Slovenian Football Cup |
| Spain | Copa del Rey |
| Sweden | Svenska Cupen |
| Switzerland | Swiss Cup |
| Turkey | Turkish Cup |
| Ukraine | Ukrainian Cup |
| Wales | Welsh Cup |

Defunct
| Country | National Cup |
|---|---|
| Czechoslovakia | Czechoslovak Cup |
| East Germany | FDGB-Pokal |
| Serbia and Montenegro | Serbia and Montenegro Cup |
| Soviet Union | Soviet Cup |
| Yugoslavia | Yugoslav Cup |

Non-UEFA
| Country | National Cup |
|---|---|
| Monaco | Challenge Prince Rainier III |
| Vatican City | Coppa Sergio Valci |

== List of men's national cups in association football in Oceania ==
Current
| Country | National Cup |
|---|---|
| American Samoa | FFAS President's Cup |
| New Zealand | Chatham Cup |
| Cook Islands | Cook Islands Cup |
| Fiji | Fiji FA Cup Tournament |
| New Caledonia | Coupe de Calédonie |
| Papua New Guinea | Papua New Guinea FA Cup |
| Samoa | Samoa Cup |
| Solomon Islands | Solomon Cup |
| Tahiti | Tahiti Cup |
| Tonga | Tonga Cup |
| Vanuatu | Port Vila FA Cup |

== List of women's national cups in association football in Africa ==
Current
| Country | National Cup |
|---|---|
| Algeria | Algerian Women's Cup |
| Burkina Faso | Burkinabé Women's Cup |
| Burundi | Coupe du Burundi Féminine |
| Cameroon | Coupe du Cameroun Féminine |
| Comoros | Comorian Women's Cup |
| Congo | Coupe du Congo Féminine |
| Ivory Coast | Côte d'Ivoire Women's Cup |
| Djibouti | Coupe de Djibouti Féminin |
| Egypt | Egyptian Women's Cup |
| Equatorial Guinea | Copa de la Primera Dama de la Nación |
| Eswatini | Women's Ingwenyama Cup |
| Gambia | GFF Women's FF Cup |
| Ghana | Ghana Women's FA Cup |
| Kenya | FKF Women's Cup |
| Liberia | Liberian FA Women's Cup |
| Mali | Coupe du Mali Féminine |
| Mauritius | National Women's MFA Cup |
| Morocco | Coupe du Trône Féminine |
| Namibia | NFA Cup (Women) |
| Nigeria | Nigeria Women's Federation Cup |
| Rwanda | Rwanda Women's Peace Cup |
| Senegal | Coupe du Sénégal Féminine |
| South Sudan | Women's South Sudan Cup |
| Tunisia | Tunisia Women's Cup |
| Uganda | FUFA Women's Cup |
| Zambia | ZFA Women's Cup |
| Zimbabwe | Women's Munhumutapa Challenge Cup |

== List of women's national cups in association football in the Americas ==
Current
| Country | National Cup |
|---|---|
| Argentina | Women's Federal Cup |
| Bahamas | Women's Knockout Cup |
| Brazil | Copa do Brasil Feminina |
| Barbados | Women's Prime Minister's Cup |
| British Virgin Islands | BVIFA President's Cup (Women) |
| Canada | W Canadian Championship |
| Cayman Islands | CIFA Women's FA Cup |
| Costa Rica | Torneo de Copa Femenina de Costa Rica |
| Guyana | GFF Women's Cup |
| Paraguay | Copa Paraguay FEM |
| Puerto Rico | Copa de Puerto Rico Femenina |
| Saint Kitts and Nevis | Women's Federal Cup |
| Venezuela | Copa Venezuela Femenina |
| U.S. Virgin Islands | USVISF Federation W Cup |

== List of women's national cups in association football in Asia ==
Current
| Country | National Cup |
|---|---|
| Bahrain | Bahrain Women's Cup |
| China | Chinese Women's FA Cup |
| Hong Kong | Hong Kong Women's FA Cup |
| Indonesia | Piala Pertiwi |
| Japan | Empress's Cup |
| Jordan | Women's Jordan Cup |
| South Korea | W Korea Cup |
| Kyrgyzstan | Women's Kyrgyzstan Cup |
| Lebanon | Lebanon Women's Cup |
| Nepal | ANFA Women's Championship |
| Pakistan | National Women's Football Championship |
| Philippines | PFF Women's Cup |
| Saudi Arabia | Saudi Women's Cup |
| Singapore | FAS Women's Challenge Cup |
| United Arab Emirates | UAE Women's Super Cup |
| Uzbekistan | Uzbekistan Women's Cup |
| Vietnam | Vietnamese Women's National Cup |

== List of women's national cups in association football in Europe ==
Current
| Country | National Cup |
|---|---|
| Albania | Albanian Women's Cup |
| Austria | ÖFB Frauen Cup |
| Belarus | Belarusian Women's Cup |
| Belgium | Women's Belgian Cup |
| Bosnia and Herzegovina | Bosnia and Herzegovina Women's Football Cup |
| Bulgaria | Bulgarian Women's Cup |
| Croatia | Croatian Women's Football Cup |
| Cyprus | Cypriot Women's Cup |
| Czech Republic | Czech Women's Cup |
| Denmark | Danish Women's Cup |
| England | Women's FA Cup |
| Estonia | Estonian Women's Cup |
| Faroe Islands | Faroese Women's Cup |
| Finland | Finnish Women's Cup |
| France | Coupe de France Féminine |
| Georgia | Georgian Women's Cup |
| Germany | DFB-Pokal Frauen |
| Gibraltar | Women's Rock Cup |
| Greece | Greek Women's Cup |
| Hungary | Hungarian Women's Cup |
| Iceland | Icelandic Women's Football Cup |
| Israel | Israeli Women's Cup |
| Italy | Coppa Italia Femminile |
| Kazakhstan | Kazakhstani Women's Cup |
| Kosovo | Kosovo Women's Cup |
| Latvia | Latvian Women's Cup |
| Lithuania | Lithuanian Women's Cup |
| Luxembourg | Luxembourg Women's Cup |
| Malta | Maltese Women's Cup |
| Moldova | Moldovan Women's Cup |
| Montenegro | Montenegrin Cup For Women |
| Netherlands | KNVB Women's Cup |
| North Macedonia | Macedonian Women's Football Cup |
| Northern Ireland | IFA Women's Challenge Cup |
| Norway | Norwegian Women's Cup |
| Poland | Polish Women's Cup |
| Portugal | Taça de Portugal Feminina |
| Republic of Ireland | FAI Women's Cup |
| Romania | Cupa României Feminin |
| Russia | Russian Women's Cup |
| Scotland | Scottish Women's Cup |
| Serbia | Serbian Women's Cup |
| Slovakia | Slovak Women's Cup |
| Slovenia | Slovenian Women's Cup |
| Spain | Copa de la Reina |
| Sweden | Svenska Cupen |
| Switzerland | Swiss Women's Cup |
| Ukraine | Ukrainian Women's Cup |
| Wales | FAW Women's Cup |

== List of women's national cups in association football in Oceania ==
Current
| Country | National Cup |
|---|---|
| American Samoa | FFAS Women's National Cup |
| New Zealand | Kate Sheppard Cup |
| Cook Islands | CIFA Women's Knockout Cup |
| Fiji | Women's Inter-District Championship |
| New Caledonia | Coupe Fédérale Féminine |
| Papua New Guinea | PNGFA Cup (Women) |
| Tahiti | Coupe de Polynésie Féminine |
| Tonga | Heilala Women's Football Cup |

== Giant-killing ==
A giant-killing, also known as an upset, is when lower-league sides slay the 'giant' of a team objectively viewed as the odds-on favorite to win the tie, or the whole tournament.

Whereas Points-based competitions such as the Premier League rely on teams maintaining consistent form for the duration of the campaign, the stakes are much higher in national cup matches, which follow a knockout format, as everything is on the line during the course of a single match.

Some examples of giant-killings include :

- Hereford United 2-1 Newcastle United, which was an FA Cup Third round replay after the first match had resulted in a 2–2 draw. The result, a 2–1 extra time victory for Hereford, is notable for being one of the greatest shocks of all time in the history of the FA Cup, as Hereford were the lowest-ranked non-league side to beat a top-flight opposition in English footballing history. The home team, Hereford United, were playing in the Southern Football League, the fifth tier of the English football league system. The away team, Newcastle United, played in the English First Division, the first tier.
- A major upset in Spanish football was the Alcorconazo, when in the first leg of a 2009–10 Copa del Rey AD Alcorcón won over Real Madrid 4–0. Real Madrid is one of the largest clubs in Spanish football and the world while Alcorcón team played in the third-tier Segunda División B. Because Real Madrid won the second leg only 1–0, Alcorcón advanced victorious to the next round. The half-time substitution of Guti when the score was 3–0 and when he was booked before was another topic in the Spanish press because of words exchanged between the player and his coach, Manuel Pellegrini.
- 1. FC Saarbrücken (as a 3. Liga side), managed to string together a run of giant-killings. They upset Bundesliga giants FC Bayern Munich with a historic 2–1 win to advance to the round of 16 in the 2023–24 DFB-Pokal. At this stage they met Eintracht Frankfurt, another of the most well-established teams in the Bundesliga. An eventful second-half left the home side 2–0 victors and moving through to the quarterfinals. They went on to beat another Bundesliga side Borussia Mönchengladbach 2–1 to advance to the semi-finals for the 5th time in club history. They met the 2. Bundesliga side 1. FC Kaiserslautern in the semi-finals of the DFB-Pokal, losing at home 0–2.
- Calais RUFC entered the international spotlight during their run to the final of the 2000 Coupe de France, under Spanish coach Ladislas Lozano. Made up of teachers, dock workers and office clerks, Calais' ten-round cup run saw the team defeat regional heavyweights Lille and first division teams Racing Strasbourg and Bordeaux; they played no games at their own ground, drawn as the away team in most rounds and the later 'home' ties played at the Stade Félix-Bollaert in Lens due to issues with facilities and capacity. They eventually lost 2–1 to Nantes in the final at the Stade de France in Paris on 7 May 2000, despite leading 1–0 at half-time.

== See also ==
- League cup
