= History of Hereford United F.C. =

History of an English football club

The history of Hereford United Football Club covered the years from the club's formation in 1924 to 2014. For an overview of the club itself, see Hereford United F.C.

== 1924–1945 ==
Before the formation of Hereford United there were four leading amateur clubs in Hereford and it was believed that a higher class of football could be sustained if they were to amalgamate. After a meeting in the city, both Hereford City F.C. and Hereford Thistle F.C. decided to remain independent while St Martins and RAOC (Rotherwas) decided to merge, and thus Hereford United was formed in 1924 with Dr E.W. Maples as chairman.

The new club joined the Birmingham Combination league and began playing their home matches at the local athletics ground on Edgar Street, where Hereford City also played their matches. The first competitive match was against Atherstone United in August 1924 which ended in a 2–3 defeat. The following week Hereford travelled to Kidderminster Harriers for an FA Cup Extra Preliminary Round, losing 2–7.

Hereford spent four seasons in the Birmingham Combination League, with a best finish of 4th. The club was well-supported with gates of over 2,000 for the big matches. One of the most notable players of the early years was Viv Gregory who was a prolific goalscorer, scoring 60 goals in one season. Indeed, Hereford managed to score over 100 goals in the 1926–27 and 1927–28 seasons. Hereford were elected to the Birmingham League for the 1928–29 season by virtue of their impressive league performances and reaching the final of the Birmingham Senior Cup. They finished 11th in their first season and had a record attendance of 5,000 for their second successive cup final match, a record which stood for eighteen years. Hereford's average league finishing position was 8th in the first half of the 1930s. A highlight was reaching the FA Cup first round for the first time in 1932–33, losing 1–2 to Accrington Stanley. By 1938–39 the standard of the Birmingham League had dropped with only 11 teams participating, and attendances at Edgar Street had also dropped. A public meeting was called and it was decided that the club would apply to join the Southern League, an application which was accepted. Subsequently, the club became a limited company.

== 1945–1966 ==
Hereford's first season in the Southern League (1945–46) saw them finish second to Chelmsford City, a team who had been controversially awarded points for unplayed matches. Second place was again achieved in 1950–51 behind Merthyr Tydfil. In 1958–59 the Southern League was split into two sections: North-West and South-East. The winners of each section would contest a play-off to decide the winner of the league. Hereford won the North-West section but were beaten by Bedford Town in the play-off. A minor blip in 1964–65 saw the club relegated but this was quickly rectified with promotion the following season. Hereford's exploits in the FA Cup were steady performances to the First Round on several occasions before they reached the Second Round for the first time in 1948–49, losing 2–1 to Exeter. In fact Hereford managed to reach the Second Round six times in nine seasons. 1958–59 saw them reach the Third Round for the first time, quite an achievement for a Southern League club. In the Second Round they had defeated QPR 6–1 which was a record win by a non-league club over a league club at the time. Hereford played Sheffield Wednesday at Edgar Street in front of a record crowd of 18,114 but lost 3–0. This is still the highest attendance ever for the club. Hereford did not reach the Third Round again until 1965–66 where they were defeated 2–1 by Bedford Town.

== 1966–1986 ==
Hereford finally won election to the Football League in 1971–72, after finishing second in the league, largely thanks to their excellent FA Cup run. In this run they played ten matches, of which five were replays. In the second round, they needed two replays to defeat Northampton Town, and then faced Newcastle United of the First Division in the third round. Newcastle were held 2–2 at St James' Park before the replay at Edgar Street, which was covered by the BBC. Newcastle scored after 82 minutes through Malcolm Macdonald but then Ronnie Radford scored a 30-yard screamer at the Meadow End to make it 1–1, prompting a pitch invasion. Ricky George, who had been brought on as a substitute just minutes before, scored the winner in extra time. Radford's goal, with commentary from John Motson, was voted BBC Goal of the Season for 1971–72. In 2002, it ranked 97th in Channel 4's 100 Greatest Sporting Moments. Hereford had reached the fourth round for the first time, and their next opponents were West Ham United, another First Division team. After a 0–0 draw at Edgar Street, the Bulls were finally knocked out in the replay at Upton Park, losing 3–1 with Geoff Hurst scoring a hat-trick.

In their first season in the Football League, Hereford finished runners-up to Southport in the Fourth Division and were promoted to the Third Division. The next two seasons saw Hereford finish eighteenth and twelfth before taking the Third Division title in 1975–76 – the club's greatest honour. The following season saw Hereford finish bottom of the Second Division and they were relegated.

The club were again relegated from the Third Division the following season and so were back in the Fourth Division for the 1978–79 season. Hereford remained in this division for the next nineteen seasons. The club generally finished the seasons in low positions (including seventeenth for five consecutive seasons) and had to apply for re-election to the League in 1979–80, 1980–81 and 1982–83. 1984–85 was a better season for Hereford when they finished 5th.

== 1986–2006 ==
=== Decline and relegation ===
The 1989–90 season again saw a mediocre performance in the league, with the club again finishing 17th. They were more successful in the Cup competitions, particularly the Welsh Cup which became the club's first major silverware for 14 years. They scored nine goals past Connah's Quay Nomads in Round 3, where Paul Burton became the youngest Hereford player to score a hat-trick, at the age of 16. After wins over Kidderminster Harriers and Bangor City, they beat rivals Cardiff City 3–0 at Ninian Park in the first leg of the semi-final, before holding on in the return at Edgar Street to reach the final for the first time since 1981. On 13 May 1990 they met Wrexham at Cardiff Arms Park and won 2–1, thanks to an 84th-minute winner from Ian Benbow.

In the FA Cup, Hereford reached the Fourth Round for the first time in eight years, after a memorable victory over Walsall. With three minutes left on the clock, Hereford were 1–0 down but a penalty drew them level, then long-serving player Mel Pejic scored the winner in the 89th minute. The reward was a home tie against Manchester United, who were then 15th in the First Division. In front of the last five figure crowd at Edgar Street to date, Hereford were defeated by a Clayton Blackmore 84th-minute winner. This relieved the pressure of dismissal that manager Alex Ferguson was reported to be under at the time, and the Red Devils went on to win the Cup that season.

The early part of the 1990s saw little progress in terms of the club's Football League position, with seventeenth position being attained on no less than five consecutive occasions, under five different managers. Indeed, both Colin Addison and John Sillett were brought back for a season each in an attempt to revive the club, with little success. However the club managed to hit form under Graham Turner, who joined at the beginning of the 1995–96 season. In early 1996 the club mounted a challenge for promotion when they went from nineteenth position to sixth position in two months, securing an unlikely play-off place. However they were unable to sustain this form in the play-offs, losing over two legs to Darlington. The season was also notable for the fact that Steve White, with 29 goals, was the highest league goalscorer in the top four divisions of English football thus emulating Dixie McNeil who achieved the same feat twenty years previously.

The season that followed, 1996–97, saw a complete reverse in the club's fortunes. With debts mounting and the club having made a loss of over £300,000, Turner was forced to sell key players such as White and Richard Wilkins. A terrible run of form when the club went three months without a win meant they were sucked into the relegation dogfight. Brighton & Hove Albion, with their own well documented troubles, had seemed destined for relegation for much of the season. But they climbed above Hereford on the penultimate day of the season, leaving the Bulls 24th and bottom of the entire Football League. Both teams were level on points, and Hereford had a better goal difference, but the goals scored rule was in effect and Brighton had scored more goals. On 3 May 1997 the two clubs met in a relegation decider at Edgar Street, which was the subject of considerable media interest as one club would relegate the other. Hereford needed a win to survive while Brighton only required a draw thanks to their having scored more goals. A capacity crowd saw Hereford take the lead in the first half through an own goal by Kerry Mayo from Tony Agana's cross. Brighton equalised in the second half against the run of play through Robbie Reinelt, who snapped up the rebound after a shot crashed against the post. In the last minute Hereford had a chance to save themselves but leading scorer Adrian Foster shot weakly at the goalkeeper when one-on-one. The final whistle blew and Hereford were relegated after 25 years in the Football League. Graham Turner subsequently resigned as manager but withdrew his resignation after strong support from the board and supporters. The general belief around the club at the time was that the club were merely 'on loan' to the Conference, but it would prove to be a long road back.

=== Financial crisis in the Conference ===
By May 1997 the club had severe financial problems with debts of over £1 million, and a sizeable list of creditors. Chairman Peter Hill and the board secured two loans of £500,000 from a developing company to pay off some but not all of the creditors. As part of the arrangement control of the two leases on the Edgar Street stadium was also passed to the developers. By November 1997 matters off the field overshadowed the team's performances with the club in crisis with running costs mounting up and wages unpaid. Eventually a Company Voluntary Agreement was proposed to avoid the club being wound up by creditors, including the Inland Revenue to whom over £140,000 was owed alone. When Hill walked away from the club at the end of the 1997–98 season, Graham Turner bought the majority shareholding and took on the burden of the debt, along with Joan Fennessy. Had he not bought the shares it is likely the club would have gone under as nobody else came forward to take control of the club. On the pitch Hereford could only finish sixth in their first Conference season with the highlights being double wins over rivals Kidderminster Harriers and Cheltenham Town. Most notably a run to the FA Cup third round saw a memorable triumph over Brighton at Edgar Street which was featured on Match of the Day.

The terms of the CVA prevented Graham Turner from purchasing any players, and the dire financial situation meant any reasonable offers for players had to be accepted. A prime example was Neil Grayson, top scorer with 16 goals in that first Conference season, who was sold to Cheltenham in March 1998 after only seven months at the club. Grayson was also the last player to have been purchased for a fee by Hereford as he had arrived before the CVA came into effect. Another notable sale was that of Gavin Mahon who was sold to Brentford midway through the following season. Mahon had been an ever-present in the side and his transfer eventually earned £130,000 for the club.

The club relied heavily on decent runs in the cup competitions during these bleak financial seasons, and in 1999–00 they progressed to the FA Cup third round again. Having disposed of Burgess Hill, York City and Hartlepool United, they drew then Premiership side Leicester City at Edgar Street, which was again a feature match on Match of the Day. Leicester fielded their first team which featured the likes of Tim Flowers, Emile Heskey and Robbie Savage against a Hereford side that featured part-time goalkeeper Mark Jones (a farmer), midfielder John Snape (an electrician) and striker Rob Elmes (a teacher). Hereford forced a replay after a 0–0 draw although they came close to winning after Paul Parry, who had come through the youth system at Hereford, shot against the post with Flowers beaten. In the replay at Filbert Street Hereford took a shock lead in the first half through Paul Fewings. Leicester recovered to equalise through Matt Elliott and the match went into extra time. Leicester then went a man down after an injury to Andy Impey but Hereford had tired and could not capitalise on their advantage. In the second half of extra time Leicester scored the winning goal through Muzzy Izzet but Hereford again came close to forcing penalties when Gavin Williams nearly converted Ian Wright's header.

A run to the semi-final of the FA Trophy in 2000–01 also helped the finances. At the start of the 2001–02 season Hereford's future looked bleak, with debts of over £1.2 million owed to developers who also held the lease on Edgar Street. It seemed as though the only option to repay the debt was the redevelopment of Edgar Street and at the time, it looked as if the club would have to relocate. After a humiliating 4–1 defeat to Hayes, Graham Turner stepped down as manager to concentrate on more pressing financial issues. Player-coach Phil Robinson assumed managerial responsibilities and Hereford managed to have another run in the FA Cup. In the Fourth Qualifying Round Hereford were drawn away at Dover and came away with a 1–0 win, Gavin Williams scoring the priceless goal. The First Round match at home to Wrexham was televised live on the BBC and the money earned from this fixture kept the club alive. Graham Turner has said that had Hereford not beaten Dover, they would probably have not made it into 2002. Hereford eventually finished seventeenth in the Conference after briefly being drawn into the relegation dogfight, Phil Robinson scoring the goal that guaranteed safety in the 1–0 win over Dagenham.

=== The journey back to the Football League ===
Major changes were made for the 2002–03 season as only six players were retained. With the chance to completely rebuild the squad and the prospect of two promotion places to the League, Graham Turner decided to remain at the club despite handing in his resignation to the board along with company secretary Joan Fennessy. The team he assembled showed great promise, finishing sixth just outside the play-offs.

An excellent start was made to the 2003–04 season with the club heading the table in the first part of the season, before three costly defeats and the distraction of cup competitions eroded the advantage. Chester City took up the lead in the table which they would lose only briefly on their way to the Conference title, which they claimed in their penultimate match. Both clubs had a faultless run-in to the end of the season, with Hereford winning 11 straight matches; the first being a 9–0 televised away win at Dagenham & Redbridge, and the eleventh coming against Chester on the final day of the season in front of Hereford's largest Conference home attendance. It was Hereford's best season statistically in the Conference, but key home defeats to Leigh RMI, Woking, Tamworth and Burton had proved very costly indeed with Hereford finishing just one point behind Chester with 91 points, 28 wins, 103 goals and a goal difference of 59. This counted for little in the play-offs where Hereford were eliminated by Aldershot Town on penalties in the semi-finals, playing with ten men for 100 minutes of the match after a controversial red card for Andrew Tretton.

2004–05 again ended in failure in the play-offs with the club having lost striker Steve Guinan, midfielder Ben Smith, full back Michael Rose and goalkeeper Matt Baker to Football League clubs. This time it was Stevenage Borough who disposed of the Conference runners-up although Hereford only moved into 2nd position on the final day of the season, eventually finishing on 74 points while Barnet were running away with the Conference title. The club did enjoy extended runs in the Football League Trophy and FA Trophy competitions. Another positive was the settling of the CVA in September 2004, the club finally turning the corner financially.

The 2005–06 season saw Hereford finally secure promotion via the play-offs after a third consecutive 2nd place, despite an indifferent first half of the season averaging seventh position. The turning point was the introduction of local teenager Andy Williams which led to a 16 match unbeaten run in the league. Indeed, from the start of December to the end of the season, Hereford were only beaten once in the league. Notable comebacks in the league against Grays Athletic and champions Accrington Stanley helped preserve the best defensive record in the Conference, with six defeats and just 33 league goals conceded all season. The play-off campaign started identically to the previous two seasons with Hereford drawing 1–1 away, this time to Morecambe. In the home leg the match went into extra time with the scores level at 2–2, after three goals in the opening twelve minutes. Guy Ipoua scored the winner in the 107th minute sparking a pitch invasion, and setting up a showdown against Halifax Town in the final at Walker's Stadium, Leicester. Approximately 10,000 of the 15,499 attendance were Hereford supporters who saw their team win promotion after a 3–2 win. Halifax took the lead twice in normal time only to be pegged back twice; by Williams' diving header in the first half and substitute Ipoua, with ten minutes to go to force extra time. The winner came in the 109th minute from full back Ryan Green, and sealed Hereford's return to the Football League after nine years of Conference football.

== 2006–2014 ==
Hereford's first season back in the Football League saw them beat five of the top eight finishing clubs, as well as higher graded opposition in the cup competitions. The surprise result of the season was a 4–1 win at Lincoln City with Steve Guinan, back on loan, scoring a hat-trick. This lifted the Bulls to 9th in League Two but their remaining thirteen fixtures saw them collect just seven more points, which meant they eventually finished in 16th position.

This late season poor form meant that the bookmakers tipped the Bulls to be favourites for relegation in 2007–08. However, from November onwards the Bulls were rarely out of the top 4 in League Two, with their squad bolstered by a number of successful loan signings. In particular the signing of Gary Hooper, who scored 11 goals in 19 matches, proved the catalyst to an eventual third-place finish and automatic promotion. A run to the Fourth Round of the FA Cup equalled the club's best performance in that competition, losing 2–1 to eventual finalists Cardiff City in front of a capacity crowd at Edgar Street. The success of the season was underlined by the news, announced in March 2009, that the club had made a profit of over £400,000.

Hereford's 2008–09 season saw them playing in the third tier of English football for the first time in 30 years. With only one player signed for a transfer fee, Graham Turner again relied heavily on the loan market; attracting players such as Bruno Ngotty and Matt Murray, as well as youngsters from both Manchester United and Liverpool. The season saw them struggle to compete against better funded and supported clubs; by mid-October they were bottom with only six points. Patches of good form in mid-seasons saw them threaten to escape the relegation zone, but five consecutive defeats in March have made survival increasingly difficult. Manager Jamie Pitman was sacked in March 2012 following a poor run of form. In the 2011–12 season, Hereford were relegated from League Two on the last day of the season, despite beating Torquay United 3–2.

=== Back to the Conference & difficulties ===
Hereford will play in the Conference National in the 2012–13 season.

Hereford were expelled from the Conference on 10 June 2014 due to financial irregularities. It was revealed a week later that the club's debts could total as much as £1.3million. The club was accepted into the Southern League Premier Division for the 2014–15 season on 19 June 2014. However financial worries continue, including a winding-up petition started by Martin Foyle, who resigned as Manager in March 2014. Hearings of the winding-up petition have been adjourned a number of times, including on 7 July 2014. A number of other creditors have attached themselves to the Foyle petition, including Andy Porter, former Assistant Manager, and HMRC. A CVA was proposed by the Board of Directors of the company, but was rejected by creditors. Many Hereford fans have chosen to boycott the club due to clashes between the fans and the board. Many fans feel anger over the board's choice to not pay a bond to remain in the Conference Premier and other management choices that the fans feel are not in the club's best interests.

On 10 December 2014, after failing to fully and properly comply with obligations to respond to questions coming from an Independent Regulatory Commission, the FA suspended Hereford United from all forms of football activity with immediate effect, until the order of the Independent Regulatory Commission has been complied with to the full satisfaction of the Commission. Hereford United's suspension from all football activity was lifted by the Football Association the following day, after Chairman, and new majority shareholder, Andy Lonsdale confirmed the FA received the necessary documentation – including the transfer of shares in the club to Lonsdale.

=== End of the club ===
The 90-year-old club ceased to exist when it was wound-up in the High Court on 19 December 2014. A phoenix club Hereford F.C. was formed in 2015 and is now playing in the Vanarama National League North.
