= FA Cup Giant-Killing Award =

Award in English association football

- Country: England
- Formerly called: Ronnie Radford Giant-Killer Award
- First award: 2011
- Final award: 2019
- Last winner: Oldham Athletic (2019)

The FA Cup Giant-Killing Award was an annual award that recognised the team which achieves the most impressive giant-killing act in the FA Cup that season.

It was also known as the Ronnie Radford Giant-Killer Award, named after the Hereford United midfielder whose long-range goal against Newcastle United in a 1971–72 Third Round Replay helped bring about one of the FA Cup's most notable giant-killings. Radford scored from 30 yards to level the tie five minutes from time, and Hereford of the Southern League scored the winner in extra time through Ricky George, to advance at the expense of the First Division side.

When the award was introduced in 2010–11, fans voted for what they consider the biggest giant-killing of the season, with the victorious club being presented with the award, originally by Radford, at the FA Cup Final at Wembley Stadium. The award was discontinued after the 2018–19 season.

== Winners ==
=== 2010–11 ===
Winners: Crawley Town

10 January 2011
20:00
Third Round

Crawley Town (5)	2–1	Derby County (2)
McAllister 30'; Torres 90+1'	Report	Addison 63'

Broadfield Stadium, Crawley
Attendance: 4,145
Referee: Mark Haywood

=== 2011–12 ===
Winners: Swindon Town

7 January 2012
15:00
Third Round

Swindon Town (4)	2−1	Wigan Athletic (1)
Connell 40'; Benson 76'	Report	McManaman 35'

County Ground, Swindon
Attendance: 10,488
Referee: Peter Walton

=== 2012–13 ===
Winners: Luton Town

26 January 2013
15:00
Fourth Round

Norwich City (1)	0−1	Luton Town (5)
	Report	Rendell 80'

Carrow Road, Norwich
Attendance: 26,521
Referee: Andre Marriner

=== 2013–14 ===
Winners: Sheffield United

4 January 2014
15:00
Third Round

Aston Villa (1)	1–2	Sheffield United (3)
Helenius 74'	Report	Murphy 20'; Flynn 80'

Villa Park, Birmingham
Attendance: 24,038
Referee: David Coote

=== 2014–15 ===
Winners: Bradford City

24 January 2015
15:00
Fourth Round

Chelsea (1)	2–4	Bradford City (3)
Cahill 21'; Ramires 38'	Report	Stead 41'; Morais 75'; Halliday 82'; Yeates 90+4'

Stamford Bridge, London
Attendance: 41,014
Referee: Andre Marriner

=== 2015–16 ===
Winners: Chesham United

8 November 2015
14:00
First Round

Bristol Rovers (4)	0–1	Chesham United (7)
	Report	Blake 77'

Memorial Ground, Bristol
Attendance: 5,181
Referee: Andy Davies

=== 2016–17 ===
Winners: Lincoln City

18 February 2017
12:30
Fifth Round

Burnley (1)	0–1	Lincoln City (5)
	Report	Raggett 89'

Turf Moor, Burnley
Attendance: 19,185
Referee: Graham Scott

=== 2017–18 ===
Winners: Wigan Athletic

19 February 2018
19:55
Fifth Round

Wigan Athletic (3)	1–0	Manchester City (1)
Grigg 79'	Report

DW Stadium, Wigan
Attendance: 19,242
Referee: Anthony Taylor

=== 2018–19 ===
Winners: Oldham Athletic

6 January 2019
14:00
Third Round

Fulham (1)	1–2	Oldham Athletic (4)
Odoi 52'	Report	Surridge 76' (pen.); Lang 88'

Craven Cottage, Fulham
Attendance: 16,134
Referee: Anthony Taylor
