= Wrexham A.F.C. 2–1 Arsenal F.C. =

Wrexham v Arsenal
- The match programme cover
- Event: 1991–92 FA Cup
Wrexham	Arsenal
(Wales)	(England)
2	1
- Date: 4 January 1992
- Venue: Racecourse Ground, Wrexham
- Referee: Kevin Breen (Liverpool)
- Attendance: 13,343
- Weather: Cloudy

The 1991–92 FA Cup third-round match between Wrexham and Arsenal was played at the Racecourse Ground, Wrexham on 4 January 1992. Billed as a potential cup upset by the media, the visitors went into the match as favourites given the gulf in divisions that separated the two teams. Arsenal entered the FA Cup in the third round, as they participated in the Football League First Division, while Wrexham of the Fourth Division won their first two ties to reach this stage of the competition.

Watched by a near-capacity crowd, the visitors Arsenal began the tie more strongly, but failed to convert their chances. They took the lead minutes before half-time when Alan Smith scored from a Paul Merson cross. Wrexham's performance improved the longer the match went, and they equalised through Mickey Thomas's free kick in the 82nd minute. Two minutes later, the home side went ahead after Steve Watkin collected the ball from his teammate Gordon Davies and diverted it past goalkeeper David Seaman. A pitch invasion occurred once the whistle blew for full-time; the Wrexham players and staff joined in celebrations with their supporters. Wrexham's reward was a fourth-round tie against West Ham United which they lost in a replay.

Referred to as one of the greatest FA Cup "giant-killings" of all time, Arsenal manager George Graham described Wrexham's win as his "lowest moment in football." Graham recovered to guide his team to glory in the competition the following season, as they beat Sheffield Wednesday in the 1993 Cup final.

== Background ==
Arsenal were the reigning champions of England having won the Football League First Division title in 1990–91. The team had only lost one match in their successful league campaign, to Chelsea in February 1991. Arsenal's opponents Wrexham had finished bottom of the entire Football League the previous season. In normal circumstances this meant the club would have been relegated to the Football Conference, but The Football League's plan to expand its competition in time for the 1991–92 season meant there was to be no demotion.

Both clubs met once previously in all competitions – an FA Cup quarter-final played on 11 March 1978 which Arsenal won by three goals to two. Wrexham qualified for the third round of the 1991–92 FA Cup after beating Winsford United 5–2 in the first round and Telford 1–0 in the second round. Arsenal, like the other top division clubs, entered the competition in the third round. They went into the match as strong favourites; Vinnie Wright's pools forecast in The Times predicted an away win, though Wrexham manager Brian Flynn noted: "On paper they should murder us, but the match isn't being played on paper." Indeed, a match preview compiled by Times journalist Clive White warned against complacency for the visitors: "Wrexham are no push-overs at home and may be encouraged by the absence of Limpar, Wright and Bould in the Arsenal team." Wrexham's precarious league position was covered in a The Guardian feature piece, which examined the feasibility of the club's ambitious redevelopment project. As part of a £42 million plan, Wrexham secretary David Rhodes proposed a new 5,000 all-seater stadium, while its Racecourse Ground would be converted into a supermarket.

The FA Cup tie between Wrexham and Arsenal was not televised live in the United Kingdom, though regular updates were broadcast on BBC Radio 5, Final Score and ITV's Results Service. The match was the featured game on BBC One's Match of the Day: The Road to Wembley, a highlights programme presented by Des Lynam. Commentary was provided by Tony Gubba.

== Match ==
=== Summary ===
Wrexham's squad included three Welsh internationals, Mickey Thomas, Gordon Davies and substitute Joey Jones. The first eleven was mostly composed of youth graduates, aged 20 years or under. By comparison, Arsenal's squad was greatly experienced with seven England internationals. Manager George Graham named a strong first eleven: David O'Leary came in for Bould to partner Tony Adams in defence, while Jimmy Carter made his second start for the club since joining in late 1991.

Arsenal got the game underway and won the first corner of the match. Taken by Paul Merson, the ball was flicked on at the near post by O'Leary and reached Alan Smith. The forward's header was obstructed by a Wrexham player, who proceeded to clear it out. It did not take long for Arsenal to create another chance; Nigel Winterburn played the ball down the left side of the pitch, finding Merson who ran in towards the penalty area and produced a cross. The ball was cleared, but reached Carter whose effort near the penalty spot went wide of the right-side post. Wrexham managed to get into the opposition's area and create half-chances, but then Arsenal broke forward again with Kevin Campbell having a shot on target. Gareth Owen nearly scored the opener, when he controlled the ball from a flick on and instinctively took a shot that whistled past the post. Two minutes before the interval, Arsenal took the lead. Merson surged forward into the penalty area and his cross was met Smith who slid the ball past goalkeeper Vince O'Keefe. Wrexham almost equalised immediately from the restart, but David Seaman denied Steve Watkin by rushing towards the midfielder and obstructing him.

In the second half, Arsenal struggled to overrun Wrexham as the home side limited their time on the ball and closed players down quickly. Long ball tactics from Arsenal however still saw chances, as Winterburn hit the bar and Campbell had a shot blocked by O'Keefe. In the 82nd minute, Wrexham were awarded free kick from 25 yards (23 m). Having faked to take it quickly, Thomas lined up the shot which arrowed into the top corner past Seaman. The Arsenal goalkeeper had got fingertips from his right-hand to the effort, but not enough to stop it flying in. Within two minutes of the equaliser, Wrexham went ahead: a poor clearance by Winterburn resulted in Davies latching onto the ball over the top and, instead of volleying an effort on goal, he squared it for Watkin. Adams went across the midfielder in an attempt to intervene, but fumbled. An outstretching Watkin poked the ball past Seaman which went beneath the goalkeeper. Arsenal responded by dominating the final minutes with repeated attacks, but Wrexham's defence stood firm. Carter had the ball in the net late on, but the referee ruled the goal out for offside; the final whistle was blown moments later and sparked a pitch invasion from the joyous home fans.

=== Details ===
4 January 1992
15:00 GMT

Wrexham (Wales)	2–1	(England) Arsenal
Thomas 82'; Watkin 84'		Smith 43'

Racecourse Ground, Wrexham
Attendance: 13,343
Referee: Kevin Breen (Liverpool)

Wrexham	Arsenal

GK	1	(England) Vince O'Keefe
DF	2	(England) Andy Thackeray
DF	3	(Republic of Ireland) Phil Hardy
DF	4	(Republic of Ireland) Brian Carey
MF	5	(Wales) Mickey Thomas (c)
DF	6	(England) Mark Sertori
MF	7	(Wales) Gordon Davies
MF	8	(Wales) Gareth Owen
FW	9	(England) Karl Connolly
FW	10	(Wales) Steve Watkin
MF	11	(Wales) Wayne Phillips
Substitutes:
DF	12	(Wales) Joey Jones
MF	14	(England) Jimmy Kelly
Manager:
(Wales) Brian Flynn

GK	1	(England) David Seaman
DF	2	(England) Lee Dixon
DF	3	(England) Nigel Winterburn
MF	4	(England) David Hillier
DF	5	(Republic of Ireland) David O'Leary
DF	6	(England) Tony Adams (c)
MF	7	(England) David Rocastle
FW	8	(England) Kevin Campbell	Substituted off
FW	9	(England) Alan Smith
MF	10	(England) Paul Merson
MF	11	(England) Jimmy Carter
Substitutes:
DF	12	(England) Andy Linighan
MF	14	(England) Perry Groves	Substituted on
Manager:
(Scotland) George Graham

Match rules

- 90 minutes.
- Replay if scores still level.
- Two named substitutes.
- Maximum of two substitutions.

== Aftermath and legacy ==
A jubilant Thomas described the free kick as the most crucial goal of his career, and believed Wrexham had every chance of causing another upset in the next round, despite an unfavourable away draw: "We are disappointed not to be at home but after beating the champions we're not afraid of anyone." He credited the club for their conditioning programme but also attributed the good form to casual drinking: "I always have two pints of Guinness on a Friday, sometimes more. It gives me energy, I feel stronger and believe in it." His manager Flynn admitted Thomas "trains when he wants to train," and added: "I will take whatever he's taking to keep him going. And if he was 10 years younger I'd be able to sell him for £5m."

"I feel sorry for them as I have been at the top and know how difficult these games are ... They had everything to lose today and they lost it."

— Mickey Thomas following the match

Graham offered no complaints and told reporters: "I thought they played very well. We just didn't finish them off. It's a thin dividing line between success and failure." He went on to call the defeat his "lowest moment in football." Wrexham midfielder Davies accused Arsenal of underestimating their opponents and felt their unrest at having conceded the equaliser worked to the home side's advantage: "I thought they were going to be a lot more professional when they were leading and tighten it up. They treated it as a training match. We've got a team of youngsters and two old men and perhaps our desire to win was greater than theirs."

Wrexham were drawn to play West Ham United in the fourth round, where they secured a 2–2 draw at the Boleyn Ground thanks to goals from Wayne Phillips and Lee Jones. The replay was played on 4 February with a solitary West Ham goal coming from defender Colin Foster, securing a 1–0 win in front of 17,995 fans at the Racecourse Ground. Arsenal's league form in the meantime stuttered as they recorded no wins in January. The team ended the campaign strongly, putting together a sequence of 16 games unbeaten to finish fourth. In the cup competitions the following season Arsenal performed better; Graham guided his team to success in the Football League and FA Cup finals.

On the 20th anniversary of the match, Thomas recalled the goal as "...the one people talk about. I don’t mind, though. It's still my best ever." He disclosed that his teammates never thought Wrexham had a chance of progressing into the fourth round, rather "we just wondered how many they were going to score." Cited as one of the greatest upsets in Cup history, commentator John Motson described the Wrexham-Arsenal tie as a "giant killing which has stood the test of time." In 2013, the match featured in a list of greatest ever FA Cup upsets, as voted for by ESPN viewers.

== See also ==
- Hereford United 2–1 Newcastle United
- Norwich City F.C. 0–1 Luton Town F.C. (2013)
- Chelsea F.C. 2–4 Bradford City A.F.C.
- Macclesfield 2–1 Crystal Palace (2026)
