= Chelsea F.C. 2–4 Bradford City A.F.C. =

Association football match

Chelsea v Bradford City (2015)
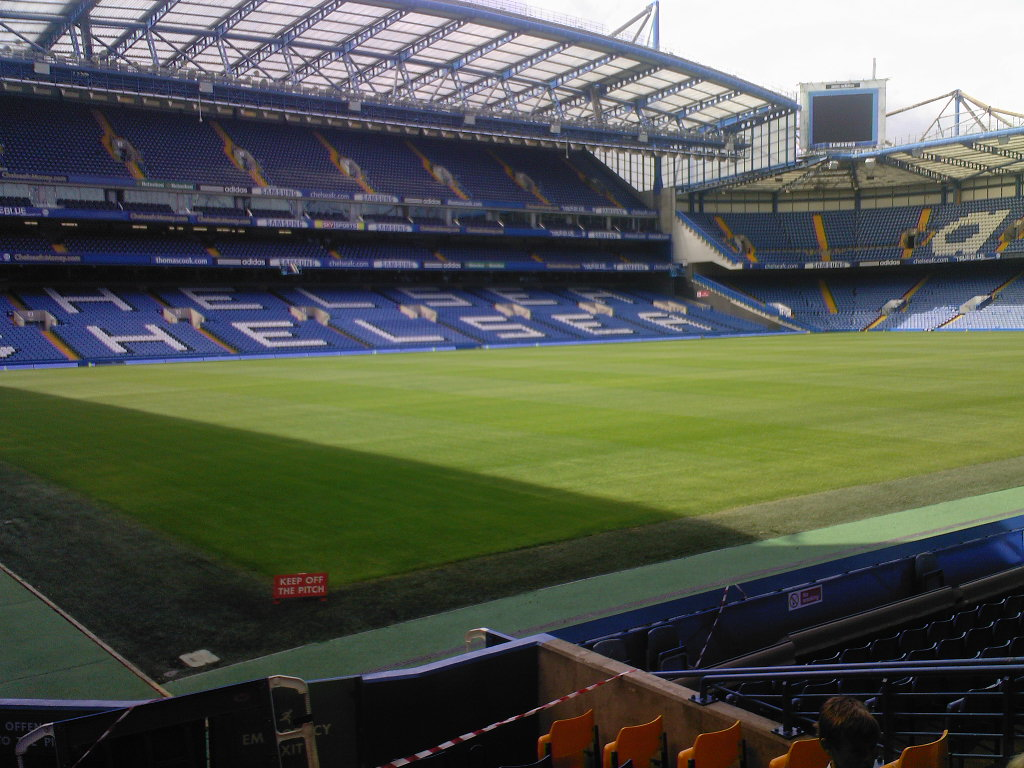
- The match was played at Stamford Bridge, Chelsea's home stadium
- Event: 2014–15 FA Cup fourth round proper
Chelsea	Bradford City
2	4
- Date: 24 January 2015
- Venue: Stamford Bridge, London
- Referee: Andre Marriner (Birmingham)
- Attendance: 41,014

The 2014–15 FA Cup fourth round match between Chelsea and Bradford City was played on 24 January 2015 at Stamford Bridge in West London. The match is considered not only one of the biggest FA Cup upsets in history, but also one of the most dramatic comebacks in the history of the competition, with Bradford City winning 4–2 away, despite being 2–0 down after 38 minutes. In December 2019 readers of Bradford-based newspaper Telegraph & Argus voted it Bradford City's best match of the 2010s.

Chelsea were leading 2–0 after 38 minutes with goals from Gary Cahill and Ramires before Jon Stead scored in the 41st minute to make it 2–1 at half-time. However, Bradford City staged a second half comeback as Filipe Morais, Andy Halliday, and Mark Yeates each scored a goal (including one in stoppage time) to help Bradford City win the game 2–4, thus allowing the Bantams to reach the fifth round of the FA Cup for the first time in 18 years. It also ended Chelsea's hopes of winning a quadruple that season. The match became Chelsea's first home loss that season, and the first time they had conceded three goals at home to a lower division side in the FA Cup since their 1991 third round match against Oxford United.

At the time, Chelsea were at the top of the table in the Premier League and Bradford City were 6th in League One, meaning there were 49 places between the two clubs. Bradford City entered the competition in the first round and went through to the fourth round after winning a replay against Millwall 4–0 at home.

The 2014–15 FA Cup Fourth round is known as one of the most eventful in recent times. Only one of the then "big six" teams in England won at the first attempt, which was Arsenal who beat the then-Championship side Brighton & Hove Albion away 3–2. Arsenal went on to win the competition. On that same day, then-defending Premier League champions Manchester City also lost their fourth-round match at home by a margin of 2 against then-Championship side, Middlesbrough. Leicester City who were struggling with poor form going into the match, beat Tottenham Hotspur at White Hart Lane. Meanwhile, Manchester United and Liverpool had been held to 0–0 draws with then-League Two clubs Cambridge United and Championship Bolton Wanderers respectively, forcing replays (which they won 3–0 and 2–1, respectively).

== Background ==
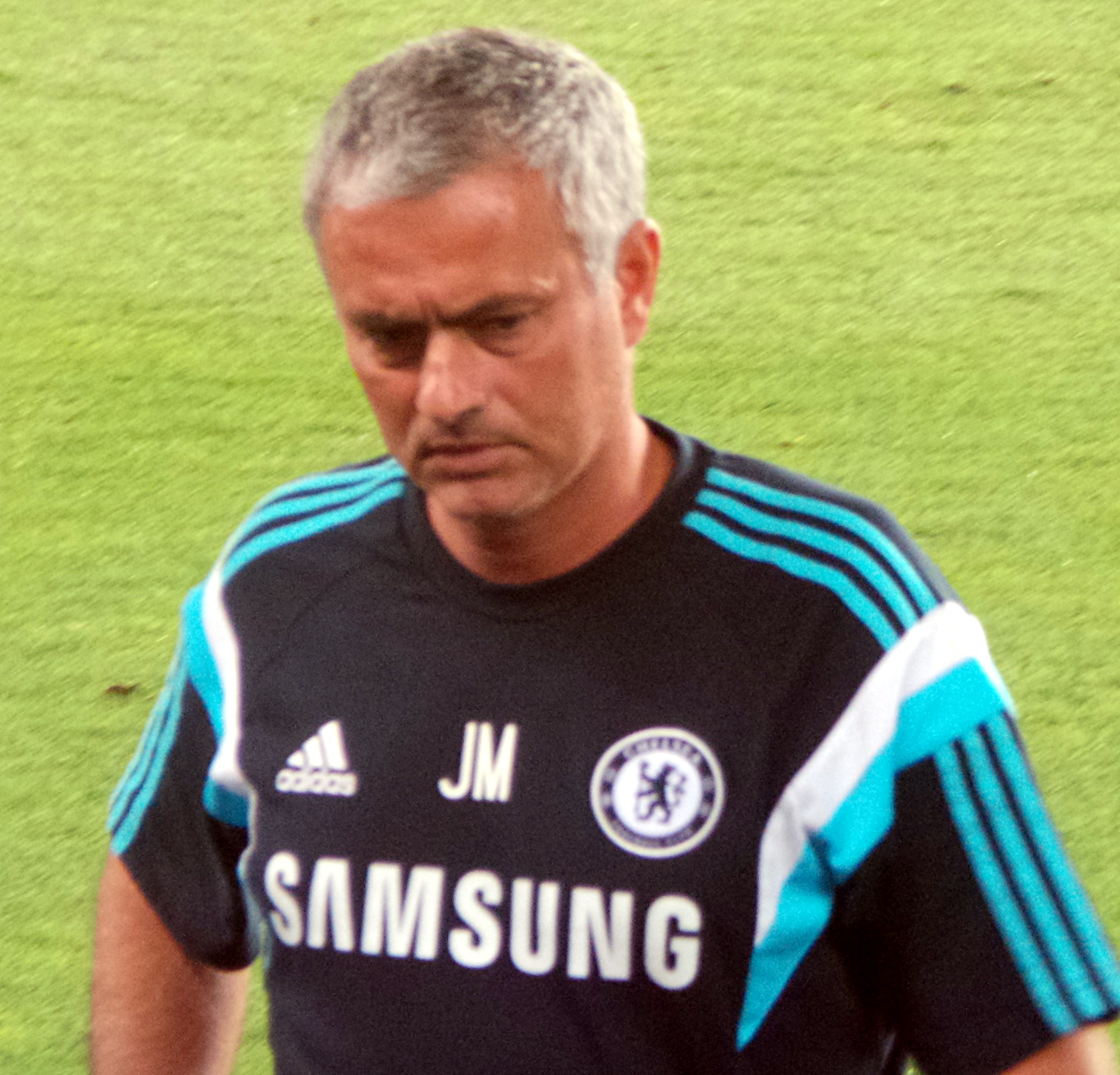
Jose Mourinho while at Chelsea in 2014

At the time, Chelsea were comfortably sitting at the top of the Premier League table, 5 points ahead of eventual runners-up Manchester City. They had also finished at the top of their UEFA Champions League group and were in the semi-finals of the Football League Cup. Conversely, Bradford City were in their second-consecutive season in League One, after winning the 2013 Football League Two play-off final against Northampton Town. Bradford City's Portuguese winger, Filipe Morais joined Chelsea's academy in 2003 when he was 16. While José Mourinho was in his first stint as Chelsea manager, he promoted Morais to the first team at the start of the 2005–06 season, but he did not make any appearances as he was loaned out to MK Dons for most of the season. Billy Knott also spent time in Chelsea's academy, from 2007 to 2010, before transferring to Sunderland.

During a press conference before the match, José Mourinho said that if they were to lose to Bradford City that afternoon, it would be a "big disgrace" due to the fact that the Blues were one of the stronger sides in England at the time.

=== Route to the match ===
Chelsea		Round	Bradford City
Opponent	Result		Opponent	Result
bye		First round proper	FC Halifax Town (5)	1–2 (A)
bye		Second round proper	Dartford (5)	4–1 (H)
Watford (1)	3–0 (H)	Third round proper	Millwall (2)	3–3 (A)
		Third round replay	Millwall (2)	4–0 (H)

== Match ==
Chelsea took the lead in the 21st minute, when Gary Cahill volleyed the ball into the net from a corner taken by Oscar. Chelsea dominated possession until their next goal, which came in the 38th minute, after Ramires ran through the Bradford defence. Two minutes later, Bradford scored from a free kick; the ball was passed from Morais to Andrew Davies and then to Jon Stead, who scored to make the score 2–1.

The early second half was marked by a number of chances for both teams. José Mourinho brought on Willian for Mohamed Salah and Cesc Fàbregas for John Obi Mikel, who had suffered a head injury. Morais scored an unexpected equaliser in the 75th minute from a throw-in to bring the game to 2–2. Loïc Rémy was immediately substituted for Eden Hazard, but Chelsea still failed to produce a goal. Phil Parkinson made his first substitution in the 80th minute, taking off Billy Knott for Mark Yeates. Two minutes later, Andy Halliday scored to put Bradford in front. Chelsea were unable to score during seven minutes of stoppage time, while Yeates chipped the ball over Petr Čech in the 94th minute to secure a famous victory for Bradford City.

=== Details ===
24 January 2015
15:00 GMT

Chelsea	2–4	Bradford City
Cahill 21'; Ramires 38'	Report	Stead 41'; Morais 75'; Halliday 82'; Yeates 90+4'

Stamford Bridge, London
Attendance: 41,014
Referee: Andre Marriner (Birmingham)

Chelsea	Bradford City

GK	1	(Czech Republic) Petr Čech
DF	24	(England) Gary Cahill
DF	28	(Spain) César Azpilicueta
DF	5	(France) Kurt Zouma
DF	31	(Denmark) Andreas Christensen
MF	12	(Nigeria) John Obi Mikel	(substituted off) 70'
MF	7	(Brazil) Ramires
MF	8	(Brazil) Oscar
FW	11	(Ivory Coast) Didier Drogba (c)
FW	18	(France) Loïc Rémy	(substituted off) 76'
FW	17	(Egypt) Mohamed Salah	(substituted off) 70'
Substitutes:
MF	4	(Spain) Cesc Fàbregas	(substituted on) 70'
MF	22	(Brazil) Willian	(substituted on) 70'
MF	10	(Belgium) Eden Hazard	(substituted on) 76'
GK	13	(Belgium) Thibaut Courtois
DF	6	(Netherlands) Nathan Aké
DF	26	(England) John Terry
MF	36	(England) Ruben Loftus-Cheek
Manager:
(Portugal) José Mourinho

GK	12	(England) Ben Williams
DF	2	(England) Stephen Darby (c)	(yellow card) 90+2'
DF	5	(England) Andrew Davies
DF	23	(Northern Ireland) Rory McArdle	(yellow card) 23'
DF	3	(Australia) James Meredith
MF	20	(Portugal) Filipe Morais		(substituted off) 89'
MF	7	(England) Gary Liddle	(yellow card) 45+2'
MF	11	(England) Billy Knott		(substituted off) 80'
MF	25	(Scotland) Andy Halliday	(yellow card) 82'	(substituted off) 87'
FW	9	(England) James Hanson
FW	16	(England) Jon Stead
Substitutes:
MF	14	(Republic of Ireland) Mark Yeates	(substituted on) 80'
DF	18	(France) Christopher Routis	(substituted on) 87'
FW	10	(Republic of Ireland) Billy Clarke	(substituted on) 89'	(yellow card) 90+3'
GK	22	(England) Matthew Urwin
DF	6	(Republic of Ireland) Alan Sheehan
MF	17	(England) Jason Kennedy
FW	13	(Ivory Coast) François Zoko
Manager:
(England) Phil Parkinson

Match rules

- 90 minutes
- Match replayed if scores level
- Maximum of 3 substitutions

== Post-match ==
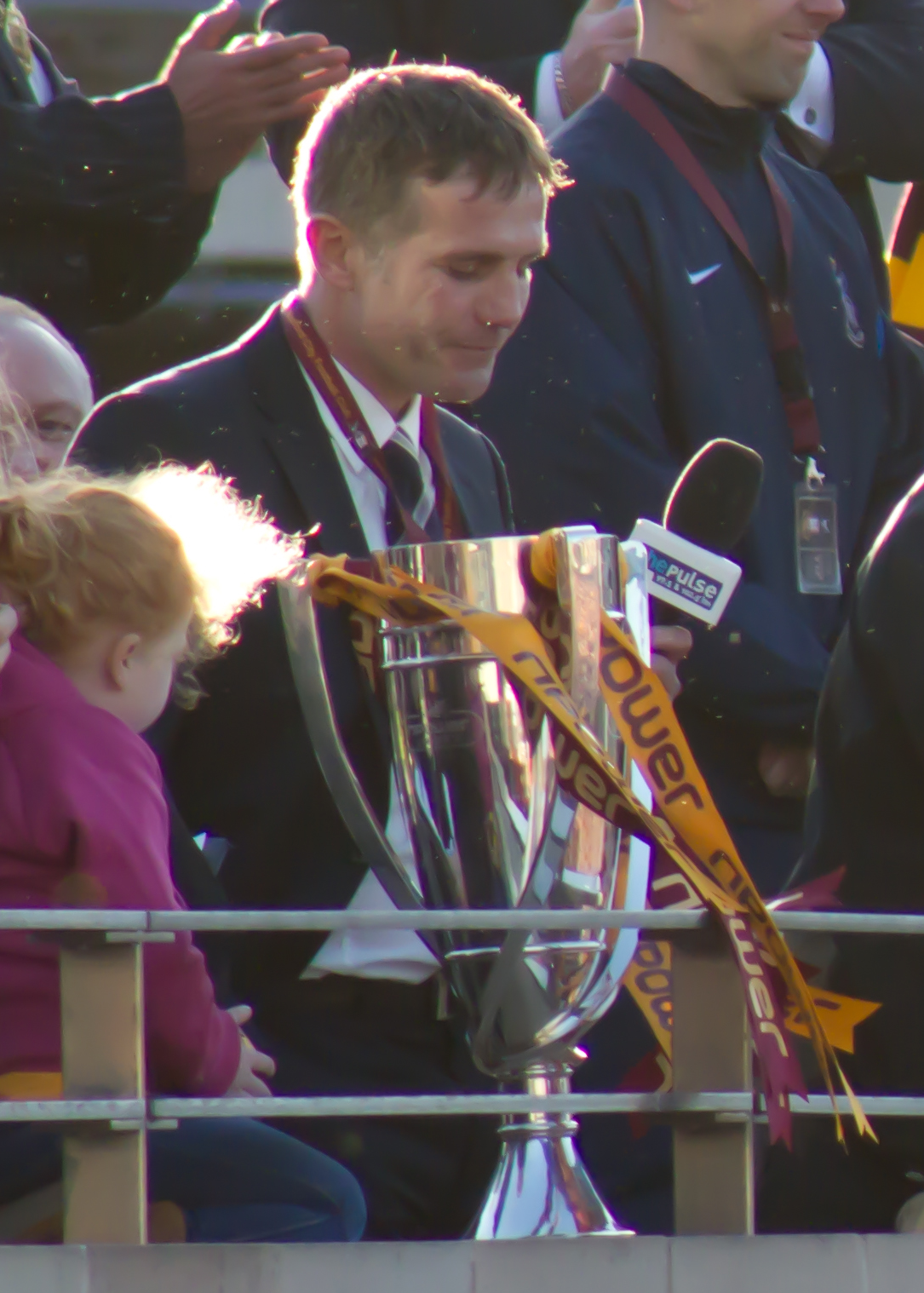
Phil Parkinson celebrating with Bradford City after they won the 2013 Football League Two play-offs, which promoted them to League One.

Immediately following the full-time whistle, the Bradford City players ran straight for the stand with the away supporters to celebrate their unlikely victory. Chelsea manager, José Mourinho clapped in respect and walked into the tunnel with the team's substitutes. After the game, he went into Bradford City's dressing room and shook the hands of Parkinson, Bradford City's staff, and all of the players, congratulating them for their performance. Bradford City goalkeeper, Ben Williams, described Mourinho as "classy and humble" when he walked into their dressing room.

Mourinho described the match as surprising and incredible, and that their comeback was one of the things that makes football and the magic of the FA Cup so special. However, he was very disappointed with his team's performance and committed to his words before the press conference and considered the result a "disgrace" on both his record and Chelsea's record.

Bradford City manager, Phil Parkinson described the moment as "surreal" and was very impressed with his players due to the result of the match. He also said that this win against Chelsea was much more impressive than their run to the 2013 Football League Cup Final, where they beat the likes of Arsenal, Aston Villa, and Wigan Athletic, all of whom were in the Premier League at the time. They did however, lose that final 5–0 to Swansea City. Billy Knott also thought that the game was impressive and said that it was the "greatest moment of his career". Chelsea legend, John Terry, even gave him his shirt after the match, which he then gave to his father, a Chelsea supporter. Terry also complimented James Hanson's performance. Filipe Morais stated that "bravery" played a huge role in staging their comeback against the Blues.

== Aftermath ==
The press and English football fans have dubbed the result as one of the most ridiculous upsets in the history of the competition. Former Liverpool player, Robbie Fowler, and former Tottenham player, Jermaine Jenas, described the game as "the greatest FA Cup upset", as the Bantams had "too many odds against them". Bradford won the FA Cup Giant-Killing Award as a result, for the biggest FA Cup giant-killing of the season.

=== Bradford City ===
Because of that win, Bradford City progressed to the fifth round, where they would play against another Premier League club, Sunderland. They won the game in their home stadium by a score of 2–0, and reached the Quarter-finals. They did not make a trip to Wembley Stadium though, as they lost 3–0 away to Reading after a replay, ending their FA Cup run. It was also their first quarter-final appearance in the FA Cup since the 1975–76 season. Bradford City would end up finishing 7th in League One, just narrowly missing out on the promotion play-offs by 4 points. They were not playing in any other competitions at the time, as they were knocked out of both the Football League Trophy and Football League Cup back in September.

=== Chelsea ===
Chelsea did not let that upset affect the rest of their season. Three days after the upset, they would win their second-leg tie against Liverpool in the EFL Cup semi-finals by a score of 1–0 thanks to an extra time goal by Branislav Ivanović, allowing them to win 2–1 on aggregate. They would then go on and win the final 2–0 against London rivals, Tottenham Hotspur. They would also stay first in the Premier League for the rest of the season, and secure their 5th English title with 3 games to spare, after a 1–0 win against Crystal Palace. However, their hopes of progressing past the round of 16 of the UEFA Champions League ended after they tied the second leg 2–2 at Stamford Bridge, bringing the aggregate score to 3–3, allowing Paris Saint-Germain to go to the next round on away goals. Bradford City were the only away side to win at Chelsea all season.

== See also ==
- Newcastle United F.C. 0–1 Crystal Palace F.C. (1907)
- Hereford United 2–1 Newcastle United
- Sutton United 2–1 Coventry City (1989)
- Wrexham A.F.C. 2–1 Arsenal F.C.
- Norwich City F.C. 0–1 Luton Town F.C. (2013)
- Burnley F.C. 0–1 Lincoln City F.C. (2017)
