= Fred Potter =

English footballer (1940–2024)

Personal information
- Date of birth: 29 November 1940
- Place of birth: Cradley, England
- Date of death: 23 July 2024 (aged 83)
- Place of death: Stourbridge, England
- Positions: Goalkeeper; inside forward

Senior career*
Years	Team	Apps	(Gls)
195?–1960	Halesowen Town		
1960–1962	Aston Villa	6	(0)
1962–1966	Doncaster Rovers		
1966–1971	Burton Albion		
1971–1973	Hereford United		
- * Club domestic league appearances and goals

Fred Potter (29 November 1940 – 23 July 2024) was an English footballer who played as a goalkeeper.

== Career ==
Potter was born in Cradley Heath and played for his local side before signing for Aston Villa in July 1959. Originally an inside forward, he made his debut as a goalkeeper, replacing the injured Nigel Sims in a League Cup tie away at Plymouth Argyle in December 1960 going on to play in three First Division games over the festive period whilst Sims was injured - including two derbies against Wolverhampton Wanderers and one FA Cup tie, against Peterborough United. Looking for first team football he signed for Doncaster Rovers in July 1962. He was a regular starter in the Fourth Division, making 124 league appearances.

In 1966 he moved down into non-league football with Burton Albion, winning the Player of the Year award for the 1969–70 season. John Charles, then manager of Hereford United, signed Potter in September 1970. Potter made 33 league appearances in 1970–71, with a further 27 in various cup competitions. Potter was the goalkeeper in Hereford's FA Cup run of 1971–72, notably defeating Newcastle United in the Third Round. While Ronnie Radford and Ricky George wrote their names in the history books with their goals, Potter's 38 clean sheets that season saw him named Player of the Year.

Hereford were elected to the Football League for 1972–73 but Potter made only nine league appearances as David Icke's performances in goal kept him out of the starting eleven. Icke was forced to retire with arthritis in his knees, but Potter subsequently broke his leg on the opening day of the season. Now 33, he did not play for Hereford again.

== Later life and death ==
Potter also worked in construction for Baldwin Durafencing, and from 1966 he lived in Stourbridge near Kidderminster. Potter had three sons with his wife.

On 23 July 2024, it was announced that Potter had died at the age of 83.
