= 2026 W Korea Cup =

Tournament details
- Country: South Korea
- Dates: 23 June – 21 November 2026
- Teams: 15

The 2026 W Korea Cup (Korean: 2026 W코리아컵) is the first edition of the W Korea Cup, a domestic cup competition for women's football teams in South Korea. The tournament is administered by the Korea Football Association and the Gyeonggi Province Football Association.

== Schedule ==
The W Korea Cup is a knockout competition with 15 teams taking part across four rounds. The 15 teams comprise the eight teams of the WK League and seven elite university teams from the WU League. All matches take place in centralised venues in Icheon, Gyeonggi Province. The first round took place in June 2026, and the final is scheduled for 21 November 2026.

Round	Dates	Matches	Clubs remaining	Clubs involved	New entries this round
First round	23–24 June 2026	7	15	14	7 WK League teams 7 WU League teams
Quarter-finals	24–25 August 2026	4	8	7+1	1 WK League team
Semi-finals	11 October 2026	2	4	4	None
Final	21 November 2026	1	2	2	None

== First round ==
The draw took place on 26 May 2026. Hwacheon KSPO received a bye to the second round as 2025 WK League champions. First round matches took place from 23 to 24 June 2026 in Icheon.

Team 1	Score	Team 2
Suwon FC	2–0	Gyeongju KHNP
Ulsan College	2–1	Dankook University
Daeduk College	0–2	Uiduk University
Korea University Sejong Campus	1–2 (a.e.t.)	Seoul City
Gangwon State University	0–6	Sejong Sportstoto
Gangjin Swans	0–2	Mungyeong Sangmu
Incheon Hyundai Steel Red Angels	4–0	Daekyeung University

== Second round ==
The draw took place on 9 July 2026. Second round matches took place from 24 to 25 August at Icheon Sports Complex. Ulsan College forfeited their scheduled match against Seoul City due to the involvement of several of their players in the upcoming 2026 FIFA U-20 Women's World Cup.

Team 1	Score	Team 2
Incheon Hyundai	2–1	Mungyeong Sangmu
Uiduk University	0-6	Sejong Sportstoto
Suwon FC	3-1	Hwacheon KSPO

== Third round ==
The draw took place on 11th September. The third round took place on 11 October at Icheon Sports Complex.

Team 1	Score	Team 2
Seoul City	0-5	Suwon FC
Incheon Hyundai	1–2	Sejong Sportstoto
