= Cosma Foot =

French Guianese football team

- Full name: Club Omnisport Saint-Laurent-du-Maroni Foot
- Ground: Stade Rene Long, Saint-Laurent-du-Maroni, French Guiana
- Capacity: 4,000
- League: Promotion d'Honneur
- 2011/12: 5th
Home colours

Cosma Foot is a French Guianese football team playing in the Promotion d'Honneur Poule Ouest, the second league.

== History ==
The club is based in Saint-Laurent-du-Maroni and played his home matches in the Stade Rene Long. COSMA played long time in the French Guiana Championnat National and was after the 2009/2010 season, relegated to the Promotion d'Honneur.

== Notable players ==
- Fréderic Adinge (four matches for the French Guiana national football team)
- Janot Apagui (three matches for the French Guiana national football team)
- Hambel Difou (three matches for the French Guiana national football team)
- Jocelyn Koniki (one match for the French Guiana national football team)
- Rudy Merille (ten matches for the French Guiana national football team)

== Achievements ==
Coupe de Guyane

- 2004/2005 Final.
- 2005/2006 Final.
