= Ricky George =

English footballer (born 1946)

Personal information
- Full name: Richard Stuart George
- Date of birth: 28 June 1946 (age 80)
- Place of birth: Barnet, England
- Position: Winger

Youth career
- 1961–1963: Tottenham Hotspur

Senior career*
Years	Team	Apps	(Gls)
1963–1964	Tottenham Hotspur	0	(0)
1964–1965	Watford	4	(0)
1965–1966	Bournemouth and Boscombe Athletic	3	(0)
1966–1967	Oxford United	6	(0)
1967–1968	Hastings United		
1968–1971	Barnet		
1971–1972	Hereford United		
1972–?	Barnet		
1975	Wimbledon	6	(0)
- Cambridge City
1975–1976	Boreham Wood		
- Barnet
- Corinthian-Casuals
- * Club domestic league appearances and goals

Richard Stuart George (born 28 June 1946) is an English former footballer, businessman and columnist. He is notable for scoring the winning goal for Hereford United in their giant killing 1971–72 FA Cup match against Newcastle United. He was also part owner of Earth Summit, which won the 1998 Grand National.

== Football career ==
George signed for Tottenham Hotspur as an apprentice on leaving school at the age of 15. However he did not make a first team appearance for the Double winning side and moved to Watford, then in the Third Division, in January 1964. After almost a year he was on the move again, to Bournemouth & Boscombe Athletic. He later played for Oxford United before dropping down into the Southern League with Hastings United, Barnet and Hereford United.

George had been a supporter of his hometown club Barnet since a young age, and joined them for the first time in the late 1960s, emulating his elder brother Mike who had played for them previously. He enjoyed three years at Barnet, in what he has stated was the best team he ever played in. Memorably he scored a hat-trick in the FA Cup against Newport County, a team which contained future teammate Ronnie Radford.

=== The FA Cup ===
In January 1971, George was sold to Hereford United where he joined his former Hastings and Barnet teammate Billy Meadows. He took a while to find his feet at Edgar Street under manager John Charles but would soon become involved in arguably the greatest FA Cup shock of all time. Hereford met Newcastle United, of the First Division, in the Third Round at St James' Park and came away with a remarkable 2–2 draw. George was the substitute that day, played for the last 20 minutes and provided a cross that Meadows came within inches of converting. The replay at Edgar Street saw George named as the substitute again. When Malcolm Macdonald put Newcastle 1–0 up late in the game, George was brought on for the injured Roger Griffiths and played a key part in Hereford's triumph. He won possession on the left wing which ultimately led to Ronnie Radford's famous equalising goal. The game went into extra time and George's fresh legs paid dividends. Controlling a pass from Dudley Tyler on the edge of the area, he turned and shot into the bottom left hand corner of the goal, sparking a pitch invasion. Along with Ronnie Radford, George has become part of FA Cup folklore and his achievement is frequently referred to, particularly in the build-up to the FA Cup third round.

George started the Fourth Round match against West Ham United, which went to a replay at Upton Park after a 0–0 draw at Hereford. However he missed an open goal which would have put Hereford 1–0 up and the final score ended in a 3–1 defeat. Hereford were elected to the Football League at the end of the season but George went back to Barnet. He wound down his career in non-league football with Cambridge City, Boreham Wood and Corinthian-Casuals, and started a sportswear business in 1976.

== After football ==
In 1992, George, along with five other people, bought a share in a horse called Earth Summit. On 4 April 1998 the horse won the Grand National at odds of 7–1. George maintains extremely close ties to the racing industry.

George wrote a weekly non-league column for the Daily Telegraph and co-presented 'Matchday with Motty' for BBC Radio Five Live with the legendary football commentator John Motson. He has known Motson since the 1960s and even travelled down to Hereford with him for the Newcastle match. Ricky has summarised frequently for BBC Radio and has appeared as a pundit on several occasions, especially for matches concerning Hereford United. In 2001 his autobiography One Goal, One Horse was published, which covers his two most notable moments as well as his colourful footballing career.

In August 2018, George was imprisoned for two years for money laundering.
