= Hereford United 2–1 Newcastle United =

- Event: 1971–72 FA Cup; Third round replay
Hereford United	Newcastle United
2	1
- After extra time
- Date: 5 February 1972
- Venue: Edgar Street, Hereford
- Referee: Dennis Turner
- Attendance: 14,313

Hereford United v Newcastle United was a football match played on 5 February 1972 at Edgar Street, Hereford. The match was an FA Cup third round replay after the first match had resulted in a 2–2 draw. The result, a 2–1 extra time victory for Hereford, is notable for being one of the tournament's greatest ever shocks, as Hereford were the lowest-ranked non-league side to beat a top-flight opposition in English footballing history. It was the first time a non-league club had beaten a top-flight club in a competitive fixture since Yeovil Town's victory over Sunderland in 1949.

The home team, Hereford United, were playing in the Southern Football League, the fifth tier of the English football league system. The away team, Newcastle United, played in the English First Division.

== The build-up ==
As a Southern League team, Hereford were required to enter the FA Cup at the fourth qualifying round stage whereas Newcastle, as a top-flight team, entered at the third round stage. Hereford had beaten local rivals Cheltenham Town 3–0 before needing a replay to get past King's Lynn in the first round. More was to follow in the second round as the non-leaguers needed two replays to progress, this time defeating Northampton Town 2–1 at the Hawthorns. Hereford had reached the third round for the first time in six years, and only the third time in their history.

The two sides had met at St James' Park on 24 January 1972 for the scheduled third-round match, the match having been postponed twice for rain. 5,000 Hereford supporters made the journey to the North-East with Newcastle clear favourites, fielding six internationals in their side.

With St James' Park open on only three sides, due to the ongoing construction of the East Stand, the match kicked off and Hereford took a shock lead after 17 seconds. They had won a free kick straight from the kickoff, which was quickly lofted into the Newcastle box. Brian Owen ran around the Newcastle defence onto the end of the free kick, and put the ball past Willie McFaul to give Hereford a dream start. Newcastle quickly went 2–1 up after 13 minutes of play, thanks to goals from Malcolm Macdonald and John Tudor. But then Hereford player-manager Colin Addison equalised with a 25-yard shot and the match finished 2–2, in front of 39,301 spectators.

At the time, it was written that Malcolm Macdonald had said ahead of the match he would score ten goals against Hereford in the replay, to beat Ted MacDougall's record. However, in a later newspaper interview Macdonald claimed this story was made up.

== Match summary ==
The replay was postponed three times and was eventually played on 5 February, the day allocated for fourth-round matches. Newcastle had been forced to travel down to Herefordshire on three occasions, in the end staying for much longer than anticipated in a hotel in Worcester to get the match played. Edgar Street was packed to its 14,313 capacity for the match, with every vantage point taken. There were even spectators in trees and standing on floodlight pylons. Therefore, it is unknown what the exact attendance was, as Hereford also printed extra tickets, but it was estimated to be over 16,000. The BBC were covering the match with a then fairly new voice, 26-year-old John Motson on trial as commentator. Before the kick-off the pitch was in a very muddy condition, and it quickly deteriorated into a quagmire.

Almost immediately Newcastle were on the attack as Macdonald latched onto a misdirected header from Ronnie Radford and broke into the Hereford penalty area. However Fred Potter in the Hereford goal saved well at the feet of 'Supermac'. Hereford's Dudley Tyler had a couple of shots in the early stages which McFaul was equal to, before Addison was booked for a late challenge on Irving Nattrass, a foul the Newcastle centre half did not appreciate. From the resulting free kick on the Newcastle left, Potter made a brave save with Pat Howard poised to score.

Newcastle had the ball in the net soon after, when Macdonald's looping header dropped in. However Tudor had clearly fouled Potter and the goal was disallowed by referee Turner. There followed a frantic moment when, from the free kick, Mick McLaughlin's clearance hit Tudor and rebounded back towards the goal, only to hit the bar. Terry Hibbitt followed up with a shot, which crashed off the crossbar again before Hereford finally got the ball away.

Tyler had another chance saved at the near post from the edge of the area, as the non-leaguers made a good start to the second half. With Newcastle on the back foot somewhat, Hereford won a corner which found Ken Mallender at the back post. However the Hereford defender saw his header rebound off the post which Alan Jones then hit just wide. At the other end Newcastle won a corner themselves with Macdonald's bullet header destined for the corner of the Hereford goal. However Potter dived across to make another great save.

As Newcastle turned up the pressure, Macdonald had a golden chance when he received a pass from Hibbitt and rounded Potter. But somehow he missed an open goal, much to the amusement of the Hereford supporters. He was to make up for this miss soon after when Viv Busby, on the Newcastle right, supplied a deep cross which Macdonald headed in at the far post to finally break the deadlock. With eight minutes of normal time to go it seemed as if that would be the deciding goal, but Hereford responded by bringing on Ricky George for Roger Griffiths. The Hereford-born full back had broken his leg earlier in the match, but had played on through the pain.

George's fresh legs were to pay dividends minutes later when he won possession on the Hereford left, turned well and found Mallender. Mallender's long ball was headed on by Billy Meadows and was not fully cleared. In the midfield Ronnie Radford challenged Tudor for the loose ball, won it and played a one-two with Brian Owen. The return pass bobbled on the muddy surface but sat up kindly for Radford who unleashed a strike from 30 yards (27 m) out that, in the words of commentator Motson, "flew into the top corner of McFaul's net". The memorable scenes that followed saw a pitch invasion by many Parka-clad spectators, to be endlessly replayed for years to come.

Radford's 85th-minute equaliser forced extra time and the part-time carpenter also had a hand in the winning goal in the 103rd minute. He found Tyler on the right who hit a powerful pass to Ricky George who took a couple of touches, then turned and shot. It evaded a last gasp challenge from Bobby Moncur, and went past McFaul into the far corner to spark another pitch invasion. The stunned Newcastle players could not respond and Hereford held on for their most famous victory.

== Match details ==
5 February 1972
15:00

Hereford United	2–1 (a.e.t.)	Newcastle United
Radford 85'; George 103'		Macdonald 82'

Edgar Street, Hereford
Attendance: 14,313
Referee: Dennis Turner, Cannock

Hereford United	Newcastle United

GK	1	(England) Fred Potter
DF	2	(England) Roger Griffiths	(substituted off) 83'
DF	3	(England) Ken Mallender
DF	4	(Wales) Alan Jones
DF	5	(Wales) Mick McLaughlin
MF	6	(England) Colin Addison
MF	7	(England) Tony Gough (c)
MF	8	(England) Dudley Tyler
FW	9	(England) Billy Meadows
FW	10	(England) Brian Owen
MF	11	(England) Ronnie Radford
Substitute:
MF	12	(England) Ricky George	(substituted on) 83'
Manager:
(England) Colin Addison

GK	1	(Northern Ireland) Willie McFaul
DF	2	(Northern Ireland) David Craig
DF	3	(England) Frank Clark
DF	4	(England) Irving Nattrass
DF	5	(England) Pat Howard
DF	6	(Scotland) Bobby Moncur (c)
MF	7	(England) Viv Busby
MF	8	(Scotland) Tony Green
FW	9	(England) Malcolm Macdonald
FW	10	(England) John Tudor
MF	11	(England) Terry Hibbitt
Substitute:
DF	12	(England) David Young
Manager:
(England) Joe Harvey

MATCH RULES

- 90 minutes
- 30 minutes of extra-time if necessary
- Match replayed if scores still level
- One named substitute
- Maximum of 1 substitution

== Legacy ==
The BBC had originally only planned to show a small clip of the match, with the main focus being the fourth-round ties between Liverpool and Leeds United and Preston North End versus Manchester United, but due to the unprecedented result it was made the feature game on Match of the Day. The footage of Ronnie Radford's wonder goal has been replayed endlessly and the images of him celebrating with arms aloft, and the crowd invading the muddy pitch have become immortalised in FA Cup history. For many years, the clip was part of the Match of the Day opening titles and it was voted Goal of the Season by the programme at the end of the season. Due to the coverage of it, Radford's goal is often mistaken to be the winning goal.

Hereford went on to play West Ham United in the fourth round, drawing 0–0 at Edgar Street. The replay at Upton Park was played on 14 February, a Monday afternoon, because of power strikes, related to the Three-Day Week, in front of 42,271 spectators with a further 10,000 locked outside. Geoff Hurst bagged a hat-trick in a 3–1 win to end Hereford's cup run. At the end of the season, Hereford finished as runners-up in the Southern League and were elected to the Football League.

Meanwhile, Newcastle went on to defeat Manchester United 2–0 the following Saturday, eventually finishing 11th in the First Division.

The Football Association created the FA Cup Giant-Killing Award from 2010–11, for the season's biggest shock result in the FA Cup. It was initially named after Radford, who presented the award to representatives of the winning team during the half-time interval of the FA Cup Final.
