= Coupe de Guyane =

Football tournament in French Guiana

The Coupe de Guyane is the top knockout tournament of the French Guiana football.

== Winners ==
- 1959/60: AJ Saint-Georges
- 1960-64 not known
- 1964/65: AJ Saint-Georges 3-2 Sport Guyanais
- 1965/66: AJ Saint-Georges
- 1966-68 not known
- 1968/69: AJ Saint-Georges
- 1969/70 not known
- 1970/71: AJ Saint-Georges
- 1971/72 not known
- 1972/73: ASC Roura
- 1973/74: AS Club Colonial
- 1974/75: AS Club Colonial
- 1975/76: Olympique 2-1 ASC Le Geldar
- 1976/77 not known
- 1977/78: AS Club Colonial
- 1978/79: ASC Le Geldar (Kourou) 2-1 AJ Saint-Georges
- 1979/80: AJ Saint-Georges
- 1980/81 not known
- 1981/82: AS Club Colonial
- 1982/83: AJ Saint-Georges
- 1983/84: AJ Saint-Georges
- 1984/85: AJ Saint-Georges
- 1985-89 not known
- 1989/90: AJ Saint-Georges
- 1990/91: AS Javouhey Mana
- 1991/92: AS Javouhey Mana
- 1992/93: AS Club Colonial
- 1993/94: AS Club Colonial
- 1994/95 not known
- 1995/96: US Sinnamary
- 1996/97: AS Club Colonial
- 1997/98: US Sinnamary bt AJ Saint-Georges
- 1998/99: EF Iracoubo bt US Sinnamary
- 1999/00: AJ Saint-Georges
- 2000/01: AJ Saint-Georges bt US Macouria
- 2001/02: US Sinnamary
- 2002/03: AJ Saint-Georges
- 2003/04: AJ Saint-Georges 4-2 Club Colonial [aet]
- 2004/05: US Matoury 5-1 Cosma Foot
- 2005/06: US Macouria 2-1 Cosma Foot
- 2006/07: ASC Le Geldar 3-1 US Matoury [aet]
- 2007/08: Club Sportif et Culturel de Cayenne 4-2 AS Oyapock
- 2008/09: ASC Le Geldar 3-2 US Macouria
- 2009/10: ASC Le Geldar 2-0 US Matoury
- 2010/11: US Matoury 3-2 AJ Saint-Georges
- 2011/12: US Matoury 1-0 ASC Le Geldar
- 2012/13: US Matoury 2-2 AJ Saint-Georges [aet, Matoury on pen]
- 2013/14: ASC Le Geldar 7-1 ASC Remire
- 2014/15: US Matoury 2-2 ASC Le Geldar [aet, 5-4 pen]
- 2015/16: US Matoury 4-3 AS Etoile Matoury
- 2016/17: not finished
- 2017/18: AS Etoile Matoury 3-2 ASC Remire [aet]
- 2018/19: AS Etoile Matoury 1-0 ASC Agouado
- 2019/20: abandoned at the quarter-finals level
- 2020/21: abandoned at the quarter-finals level
- 2021/22: abandoned at the semifinals level
- 2022/23: final ASC Le Geldar de Kourou — AS Etoile Matoury not played
- 2023/24: AS Etoile Matoury 4-2 Cosma Foot
