= 1971–72 FA Cup =

Tournament details
- Country: England; Wales

Final positions
- Champions: Leeds United (1st title)
- Runners-up: Arsenal
- Third place: Birmingham City
- Fourth place: Stoke City

Tournament statistics
- Top goal scorer: Ted MacDougall (10)

The 1971–72 FA Cup was the 91st season of the world's oldest football cup competition, the Football Association Challenge Cup, commonly known as the FA Cup. Leeds United won the competition for the first time, defeating holders Arsenal 1–0 in the final at Wembley, London.

Several records were set during this FA Cup season. This was the third year in which the losing semi-finalists were required to compete in a "match for third place"; following a goalless 90 minutes, Birmingham City beat Stoke City in a penalty shootout, the first time this method had been used to determine the result of an FA Cup match.

In the first round proper, Ted MacDougall's nine goals for AFC Bournemouth as they beat Margate 11–0 remains the record for goals scored in a match in the FA Cup proper. The fourth qualifying round tie between Alvechurch and Oxford City became the longest FA Cup tie ever, lasting a total of eleven hours before Alvechurch won the fifth replay 1–0.

Matches were scheduled to be played at the stadium of the team named first on the date specified for each round, which was always a Saturday. If scores were level after 90 minutes had been played, a replay would take place at the stadium of the second-named team later the same week. If the replayed match was drawn further replays would be held until a winner was determined. If scores were level after 90 minutes had been played in a replay, a 30-minute period of extra time would be played.

== Calendar ==
Round	Date
Preliminary round	Saturday, 4 September 1971
First qualifying round	Saturday, 18 September 1971
Second qualifying round	Saturday, 9 October 1971
Third qualifying round	Saturday, 23 October 1971
Fourth qualifying round	Saturday, 6 November 1971
First round proper	Saturday, 20 November 1971
Second round proper	Saturday, 11 December 1971
Third round proper	Saturday, 15 January 1972
Fourth round proper	Saturday, 5 February 1972
Fifth round proper	Saturday, 26 February 1972
Sixth round proper	Saturday, 18 March 1972
Semi-finals	Saturday, 15 April 1972
Final	Saturday, 6 May 1972

== Qualifying rounds ==
Most participating clubs that were not members of the Football League competed in the qualifying rounds to secure one of 28 places available in the first round.

The winners from the fourth qualifying round were South Shields, Blyth Spartans, Scarborough, Bangor City, Ellesmere Port Town, Altrincham, Wigan Athletic, Nuneaton Borough, Rossendale United, Frickley Colliery, Boston United, Hereford United, Redditch United, Kettering Town, Alvechurch, King's Lynn, Maidenhead United, Enfield, Guildford City, Dover, Barnet, Romford, Margate, Basingstoke Town, Witney Town, Bridgwater Town, Crawley Town and Weymouth.

Those appearing in the competition proper for the first time were Ellesmere Port Town, Redditch United, Alvechurch, Basingstoke Town and Witney Town. Rossendale United was appearing at this stage for the first time since predecessor outfit Rossendale FC had entered the competition in 1887–88. Of the others, Frickley Colliery, Maidenhead United and Bridgwater Town had last qualified for the first round in 1963–64 and Dover had last done so in 1960–61.

== Results ==
=== First round proper ===
At this stage the 48 clubs from the Football League Third and Fourth Divisions joined the non-league clubs who came through the qualifying rounds. To complete the round, four additional non-league clubs received byes to this stage. Telford United and Hillingdon Borough were the finalists from the previous season's FA Trophy competition, while Skelmersdale United and Dagenham were the finalists from the previous season's FA Amateur Cup.

Matches were scheduled to be played on Saturday, 20 November 1971, although the Aldershot-Alvechurch match was delayed until 24 November because Alvechurch's fourth qualifying round tie against Oxford City had gone to a fifth replay which took place on 22 November, two days after the date set for the first round ties. Also of particular note, Ted MacDougall set a goalscoring record for the FA Cup proper with nine goals for Third Division AFC Bournemouth as they beat Margate of the Southern League 11–0.

Nine drawn matches in this round were settled by a single replay.

Tie no	Home team	Score	Away team	Date	Attendance	Notes
1	Enfield	2–0	Maidenhead United	20 November 1971		
2	Chester	1–1	Mansfield Town	20 November 1971		
Replay	Mansfield Town	4–3	Chester	22 November 1971		
3	Chesterfield	3–0	Oldham Athletic	20 November 1971	10057	
4	Hartlepool	6–1	Scarborough	20 November 1971	3,374	
5	AFC Bournemouth	11–0	Margate	20 November 1971		
6	Barrow	0–2	Darlington	20 November 1971		
7	Rochdale	1–3	Barnsley	20 November 1971		
8	Walsall	4–1	Dagenham	20 November 1971		
9	Gillingham	3–2	Plymouth Argyle	20 November 1971		
10	Notts County	6–0	Newport County	20 November 1971	11,976	
11	Blackburn Rovers	1–1	Port Vale	20 November 1971		
Replay	Port Vale	3–1	Blackburn Rovers	22 November 1971	5,717	
12	Bolton Wanderers	3–0	Bangor City	20 November 1971		
13	Crewe Alexandra	0–1	Blyth Spartans	20 November 1971		
14	Lincoln City	1–2	Bury	20 November 1971		
15	Doncaster Rovers	1–2	Stockport County	20 November 1971		
16	Wrexham	5–1	Bradford City	20 November 1971		
17	Bristol Rovers	3–0	Telford United	20 November 1971		
18	Rossendale United	1–0	Altrincham	23 November 1971	1,769	
19	King's Lynn	0–0	Hereford United	20 November 1971		
Replay	Hereford United	1–0	King's Lynn	24 November 1971	7,758	
20	Brighton & Hove Albion	7–1	Hillingdon Borough	20 November 1971		
21	Skelmersdale United	0–4	Tranmere Rovers	20 November 1971		
22	Southend United	1–0	Aston Villa	20 November 1971	16,929	
23	Frickley Colliery	2–2	Rotherham United	20 November 1971		
Replay	Rotherham United	4–0	Frickley Colliery	23 November 1971	9,793	
24	Southport	1–3	Workington	20 November 1971		
25	Torquay United	1–0	Nuneaton Borough	20 November 1971		
26	Ellesmere Port Town	0–3	Boston United	20 November 1971		
27	York City	4–2	Grimsby Town	20 November 1971		
28	Witney Town	0–3	Romford	20 November 1971	2,500	
29	Kettering Town	2–4	Barnet	20 November 1971		
30	Aldershot	4–2	Alvechurch	24 November 1971	4,638	
31	Guildford City	0–0	Dover	20 November 1971		
Replay	Dover	0–2	Guildford City	24 November 1971	2,156	
32	Wigan Athletic	2–1	Halifax Town	20 November 1971		
33	South Shields	3–3	Scunthorpe United	20 November 1971		
Replay	Scunthorpe United	2–3	South Shields	29 November 1971	5,272	
34	Colchester United	1–4	Shrewsbury Town	20 November 1971		
35	Basingstoke Town	1–5	Northampton Town	20 November 1971		
36	Bridgwater Town	0–3	Reading	20 November 1971		
37	Cambridge United	2–1	Weymouth	20 November 1971		
38	Crawley Town	0–0	Exeter City	20 November 1971		
Replay	Exeter City	2–0	Crawley Town	24 November 1971	3,967	
39	Redditch United	1–1	Peterborough United	20 November 1971	4,500	
Replay	Peterborough United	6–0	Redditch United	22 November 1971	5,108	
40	Swansea City	1–1	Brentford	20 November 1971		
Replay	Brentford	2–3	Swansea City	22 November 1971	15,000	

=== Second round proper ===
The matches were scheduled for Saturday, 11 December 1971. Six matches were drawn, one of which required a second replay.

Tie no	Home team	Score	Away team	Date	Attendance	Notes
1	AFC Bournemouth	2–0	Southend United	11 December 1971	14,643	
2	Barnet	1–4	Torquay United	11 December 1971		
3	Reading	1–0	Aldershot	11 December 1971		
4	Shrewsbury Town	2–1	Guildford City	11 December 1971		
5	Wrexham	4–0	Wigan Athletic	11 December 1971		
6	Barnsley	0–0	Chesterfield	11 December 1971		
Replay	Chesterfield	1–0	Barnsley	15 December 1971	14,500	
7	Bristol Rovers	3–0	Cambridge United	11 December 1971		
8	Rossendale United	1–4	Bolton Wanderers	11 December 1971	12,000	^{[A]}
9	Brighton & Hove Albion	1–1	Walsall	11 December 1971		
Replay	Walsall	2–1	Brighton & Hove Albion	14 December 1971	8,014	
10	Blyth Spartans	1–0	Stockport County	11 December 1971		
11	Mansfield Town	2–2	Tranmere Rovers	11 December 1971		
Replay	Tranmere Rovers	4–2	Mansfield Town	15 December 1971	5,703	
12	Port Vale	1–0	Darlington	11 December 1971		
13	Workington	1–3	Bury	11 December 1971		
14	Hereford United	0–0	Northampton Town	11 December 1971		
Replay	Northampton Town	2–2	Hereford United	14 December 1971	9,099	
2nd replay	Hereford United	2–1	Northampton Town	20 December 1971	8,331	^{[B]}
15	Rotherham United	1–1	York City	11 December 1971		
Replay	York City	2–3	Rotherham United	13 December 1971	10,010	
16	Romford	0–1	Gillingham	11 December 1971	8,405	
17	Boston United	2–1	Hartlepool	11 December 1971	4,400	
18	Peterborough United	4–0	Enfield	11 December 1971	7,702	
19	South Shields	1–3	Notts County	11 December 1971	8,144	
20	Swansea City	0–0	Exeter City	11 December 1971		
Replay	Exeter City	0–1	Swansea City	15 December 1971	6,858	

=== Third round proper ===
The 44 First and Second Division clubs entered the competition at this stage. The matches were scheduled for Saturday, 15 January 1972; the tie between Newcastle United and Hereford United at Newcastle was twice postponed because of a waterlogged pitch on which snow had fallen. Ten matches were drawn, each of which was settled by a single replay. The replay between Hereford and Newcastle, also the subject of several postponements and eventually played on the day scheduled for the fourth round ties, was voted "best FA Cup tie ever" in a 2007 poll hosted in The Observer newspaper. It was the first time a First Division club had been eliminated from the competition by non-league opponents since Sunderland's shock loss to Yeovil Town in 1948–49.

Tie no	Home team	Score	Away team	Date	Attendance	Notes
1	Blackpool	0–1	Chelsea	15 January 1972		
2	Burnley	0–1	Huddersfield Town	15 January 1972		
3	Bury	1–1	Rotherham United	15 January 1972		
Replay	Rotherham United	2–1	Bury	24 January 1972	14,625	
4	Preston North End	4–2	Bristol City	15 January 1972		
5	Southampton	1–1	Manchester United	15 January 1972	30,190	
Replay	Manchester United	4–1	Southampton	19 January 1972	50,960	
6	Watford	1–4	Notts County	15 January 1972	13,488	
7	Walsall	1–0	AFC Bournemouth	15 January 1972		
8	Bolton Wanderers	2–1	Torquay United	15 January 1972		
9	Wolverhampton Wanderers	1–1	Leicester City	15 January 1972		
Replay	Leicester City	2–0	Wolverhampton Wanderers	19 January 1972	32,060	
10	West Bromwich Albion	1–2	Coventry City	15 January 1972		
11	Sunderland	3–0	Sheffield Wednesday	15 January 1972	25,310	
12	Derby County	2–0	Shrewsbury Town	15 January 1972	33,463	
13	Swindon Town	0–2	Arsenal	15 January 1972	31,668	
14	Sheffield United	1–3	Cardiff City	15 January 1972		
15	Newcastle United	2–2	Hereford United	24 January 1972	39,381	
Replay	Hereford United	2–1	Newcastle United	5 February 1972	14,313	
16	Tottenham Hotspur	1–1	Carlisle United	15 January 1972	33,702	
Replay	Carlisle United	1–3	Tottenham Hotspur	18 January 1972	21,560	
17	Manchester City	1–1	Middlesbrough	15 January 1972	42,620	
Replay	Middlesbrough	1–0	Manchester City	18 January 1972	37,917	
18	Queens Park Rangers	1–1	Fulham	15 January 1972		
Replay	Fulham	2–1	Queens Park Rangers	18 January 1972	24,181	
19	West Ham United	2–1	Luton Town	15 January 1972	32,099	
20	Norwich City	0–3	Hull City	15 January 1972		
21	Millwall	3–1	Nottingham Forest	15 January 1972		
22	Crystal Palace	2–2	Everton	15 January 1972	32,331	
Replay	Everton	3–2	Crystal Palace	18 January 1972	45,408	
23	Blyth Spartans	2–2	Reading	15 January 1972		
Replay	Reading	6–1	Blyth Spartans	19 January 1972	10,550	
24	Charlton Athletic	0–0	Tranmere Rovers	15 January 1972		
Replay	Tranmere Rovers	4–2	Charlton Athletic	17 January 1972	12,512	
25	Leeds United	4–1	Bristol Rovers	15 January 1972	33,565	
26	Stoke City	2–1	Chesterfield	15 January 1972	26,559	
27	Boston United	0–1	Portsmouth	15 January 1972	11,000	
28	Peterborough United	0–2	Ipswich Town	15 January 1972	16,973	
29	Birmingham City	3–0	Port Vale	15 January 1972	32,937	
30	Oxford United	0–3	Liverpool	15 January 1972	18,000	
31	Orient	3–0	Wrexham	15 January 1972		
32	Swansea City	1–0	Gillingham	15 January 1972		

=== Fourth round proper ===
The matches were scheduled for Saturday, 5 February 1972; Hereford United, unable to complete their third-round replay until this date, played their match later that week (and the subsequent replay early the following week). Five matches were drawn, of which one required a second replay. After their heroics in the previous round, Hereford was the last non-league club left in the competition.

Tie no	Home team	Score	Away team	Date	Attendance	Notes
1	Liverpool	0–0	Leeds United	5 February 1972	56,300	
Replay	Leeds United	2–0	Liverpool	9 February 1972	45,821	
2	Preston North End	0–2	Manchester United	5 February 1972	27,025	
3	Reading	1–2	Arsenal	5 February 1972		
4	Leicester City	0–2	Orient	5 February 1972		
5	Derby County	6–0	Notts County	5 February 1972	39,450	
6	Everton	2–1	Walsall	5 February 1972	45,462	
7	Tranmere Rovers	2–2	Stoke City	5 February 1972		
Replay	Stoke City	2–0	Tranmere Rovers	9 February 1972	25,000	
8	Tottenham Hotspur	2–0	Rotherham United	5 February 1972	36,903	
9	Coventry City	0–1	Hull City	5 February 1972		
10	Portsmouth	2–0	Swansea City	5 February 1972	19,782	
11	Millwall	2–2	Middlesbrough	5 February 1972		
Replay	Middlesbrough	2–1	Millwall	8 February 1972	36,489	
12	Chelsea	3–0	Bolton Wanderers	5 February 1972		
13	Huddersfield Town	3–0	Fulham	5 February 1972		
14	Cardiff City	1–1	Sunderland	5 February 1972	27,000	
Replay	Sunderland	1–1	Cardiff City	9 February 1972	39,348	
2nd replay	Cardiff City	3–1	Sunderland	14 February 1972	8,868	^{[C]}
15	Hereford United	0–0	West Ham United	9 February 1972	15,000	
Replay	West Ham United	3–1	Hereford United	14 February 1972	42,271	
16	Birmingham City	1–0	Ipswich Town	5 February 1972	40,709	

=== Fifth round proper ===
The matches were played on Saturday, 26 February 1972. Two matches were drawn, of which one required a second replay.

Tie no	Home team	Score	Away team	Date	Attendance	Notes
1	Derby County	2–2	Arsenal	26 February 1972	39,622	
Replay	Arsenal	0–0	Derby County	29 February 1972	63,077	
2nd replay	Derby County	0–1	Arsenal	13 March 1972	40,000	^{[D]}
2	Everton	0–2	Tottenham Hotspur	26 February 1972	50,511	
3	Manchester United	0–0	Middlesbrough	26 February 1972	53,850	
Replay	Middlesbrough	0–3	Manchester United	29 February 1972	39,683	
4	Huddersfield Town	4–2	West Ham United	26 February 1972	27,080	
5	Cardiff City	0–2	Leeds United	26 February 1972	50,000	
6	Stoke City	4–1	Hull City	26 February 1972		
7	Birmingham City	3–1	Portsmouth	26 February 1972	43,886	
8	Orient	3–2	Chelsea	26 February 1972		

=== Sixth round proper ===
18 March 1972
15:00

Manchester United	1–1	Stoke City
Best 85'		Greenhoff 61'

Old Trafford, Manchester
Attendance: 54,226
Referee: John Homewood
18 March 1972
15:00

Leeds United	2–1	Tottenham Hotspur
Clarke; Charlton		Pratt

Elland Road, Leeds
Attendance: 43,937
Referee: Jack Taylor
18 March 1972
15:00

Birmingham City	3–1	Huddersfield Town
Page; R Latchford; Hatton		Cherry

St Andrew's, Birmingham
Attendance: 52,470
Referee: Pat Partridge
18 March 1972
15:00

Orient	0–1	Arsenal
		Ball 49'

Brisbane Road, London
Attendance: 32,000
Referee: Bob Matthewson

Replay

22 March 1972
19:30

Stoke City	2–1 aet	Manchester United
Smith 72'; Conroy 102'		Best 70'

Victoria Ground, Stoke-on-Trent
Attendance: 49,192
Referee: John Homewood

=== Semi-finals ===
15 April 1972
15:00

Arsenal	1–1	Stoke City
Armstrong 47'		Simpson 65' (o.g.)

Villa Park, Birmingham
Referee: Keith Walker
15 April 1972
15:00

Leeds United	3–0	Birmingham City
Jones; Lorimer

Hillsborough, Sheffield
Attendance: 55,000
Referee: Norman Burtenshaw

Replay

19 April 1972
19:30

Stoke City	1–2	Arsenal
Greenhoff (pen.)		George (pen.); Radford 76'

Goodison Park, Liverpool
Attendance: 38,970
Referee: Keith Walker

=== Match for third place ===
For the third time in what turned out to be a five-year experiment, the losing semifinalists were obliged to play off for third and fourth place. The match was held over until immediately before the 1972–73 season. After a goalless 90 minutes, the result was determined by a penalty shootout, the first time this method was used to settle a match in the FA Cup.

5 August 1972

Birmingham City	0–0 4–3 (pens.)	Stoke City

St Andrew's, Birmingham
Attendance: 25,841

=== Final ===
The final took place on Saturday, 6 May 1972 at Wembley and ended in a victory for Leeds United over Arsenal by 1–0. The goal was scored by Allan Clarke. The attendance was 100,000.

6 May 1972
15:00 BST

Leeds United	1–0	Arsenal
Clarke 53'

Wembley, London
Attendance: 100,000
Referee: David Smith

Leeds United	Arsenal

== TV coverage ==
The rights to show FA Cup games were, as with Football League matches, shared between the BBC and ITV network. All games were shown in a highlights format, except the Final, which was shown live both on BBC1 and ITV. The BBC football highlights programme Match Of The Day would show up to three games and the various ITV regional network stations would cover up to one game and show highlights from other games covered elsewhere on the ITV network. No games from Rounds 1 or 2 were shown. Highlights of replays would be shown on either the BBC or ITV.

Third round BBC Swindon Town v Arsenal, Wolverhampton Wanderers v Leicester City, Blackpool v Chelsea, Manchester United v Southampton (Midweek-replay), Hereford United v Newcastle United (Saturday-replay) ITV Southampton v Manchester United (Southern & Granada), West Ham United v Luton Town (LWT), Leeds United v Bristol Rovers (Yorkshire), Peterborough United v Ipswich Town (Anglia), Derby County v Shrewsbury (ATV), Sunderland v Sheffield Wednesday (Tyne-Tees).

Fourth round BBC Liverpool v Leeds United, Preston North End v Manchester United ITV Reading v Arsenal (Southern & LWT), Birmingham City v Ipswich Town (ATV), Huddersfield Town v Fulham (Yorkshire), Everton v Walsall (Granada), Coventry City v Hull City (Anglia-covered game out of region), Leeds United v Liverpool (Midweek replay-All regions).

Fifth round BBC Orient v Chelsea, Cardiff City v Leeds United, Manchester United v Middlesbrough, Middlesbrough v Manchester United (Midweek-replay) ITV Everton v Tottenham Hotspur (Granada & LWT), Birmingham City v Portsmouth (ATV), Huddersfield Town v West Ham United, Stoke City v Hull City (Anglia-covered game out of region).

Sixth round BBC Leeds United v Tottenham Hotspur, Manchester United v Stoke City ITV Orient v Arsenal (LWT), Birmingham City v Huddersfield Town (ATV & Yorkshire) All regions covered those two games.

Semi-final BBC Birmingham City v Leeds United, ITV Arsenal v Stoke City: All regions covered this game. Arsenal v Stoke City (Midweek Replay All Regions)

Final Arsenal v Leeds United Shown Live on both BBC and all ITV regions.

== Notes ==
A.: Match played at Gigg Lane, Bury.
B.: Match played at The Hawthorns, West Bromwich.
C.: Match played at Maine Road, Manchester.
D.: Match played at Filbert Street, Leicester.
