= 2024 Women's Inter-District Championship =

- Season: 2025
- Dates: 21—23 February 2025
- All statistics correct as of 20 February 2025.

The 2024 Women's Inter-District Championship was the 20th edition of the Women's Inter-District Championship, an association football tournament organized by the Fiji Football Association. The tournament is officially the 2024 edition, despite taking place in 2025, as it consists of teams from the 2024 season.

The tournament was won by Ba.

== Background ==
The tournament consisted of the four highest-ranking teams from the 2024 Fiji Women's Super League.

== Standings ==
Pos	Team	Pld	W	D	L	GF	GA	GD	Pts
1	Ba	3	2	1	0	11	1	+10	7
2	Labasa	3	1	2	0	6	2	+4	5
3	Rewa	3	0	0	3	0	11	−11	0
4	Nadi	3	1	1	1	3	6	−3	4

Source: FFA, RSSSF
21 February 2025
13:00

Nadi	0–4	Labasa
	Report

Fiji FA Academy, Suva, Fiji
21 February 2025
15:00

Ba	5–0	Rewa
	Report

Fiji FA Academy, Suva, Fiji

22 February 2025
13:00

Labasa	1–1	Rewa
	Report

Fiji FA Academy, Suva, Fiji
22 February 2025
15:00

Nadi	0–5	Ba
	Report

Fiji FA Academy, Suva, Fiji

23 February 2025
13:00

Rewa	2–0	Nadi
	Report

Fiji FA Academy, Suva, Fiji
23 February 2025
15:00

Ba	1–1	Labasa
	Report

Fiji FA Academy, Suva, Fiji
