= W Korea Cup =

- Organiser(s): Korea Football Association
- Founded: 2026
- Region: South Korea
- Teams: 15
- 2026 W Korea Cup

The W Korea Cup (Korean: W코리아컵) is a national football cup competition contested by women's club teams in South Korea.

== History ==
In December 2025, the Korea Football Association confirmed that the W Korea Cup would be launched in 2026 as a women's equivalent to the Korea Cup. The competition was established in 2026 with fifteen teams competing in the inaugural edition. Ahead of Round 1 of the 2026 W Korea Cup, the KFA revealed the official emblem for the competition, alongside an updated emblem for the Korea Cup, with the two competitions sharing the slogan 'The Cup for All'. The W Korea Cup was officially launched on 23rd June 2026 in Icheon.

== Format ==
The inaugural edition of the W Korea Cup features fifteen teams: the eight clubs of the WK League, and seven elite college sides. There are four rounds of competition, with a draw taking place before each round, and all matches take place at centralised venues. 2025 WK League champions Hwacheon KSPO received a bye to the second round.

== See also ==
- Korea Cup
- WK League
- Women's football in South Korea
