= Roger Griffiths (footballer) =

English footballer

Personal information
- Date of birth: 20 February 1945
- Place of birth: Hereford, England
- Date of death: 19 July 2006 (aged 61)
- Position: Right back

Senior career*
Years	Team	Apps	(Gls)
1964–1973	Hereford United	250	(26)
1974–1975	Worcester City		
- Cheltenham Town
- * Club domestic league appearances and goals

Roger Griffiths (20 February 1945 – 19 July 2006) was an English professional footballer with Hereford United. Griffiths was the first player to be substituted in Hereford United's then-42 year existence in 1966. Griffiths was a defender who made 250 appearances for the club. One of his most famous appearances was in the FA Cup match between Hereford United and Newcastle United, in which Griffiths played for 80 minutes with a broken leg. Later, Griffiths played for Worcester City and Cheltenham Town.
