= Edgar Street =

Football stadium in Hereford, England

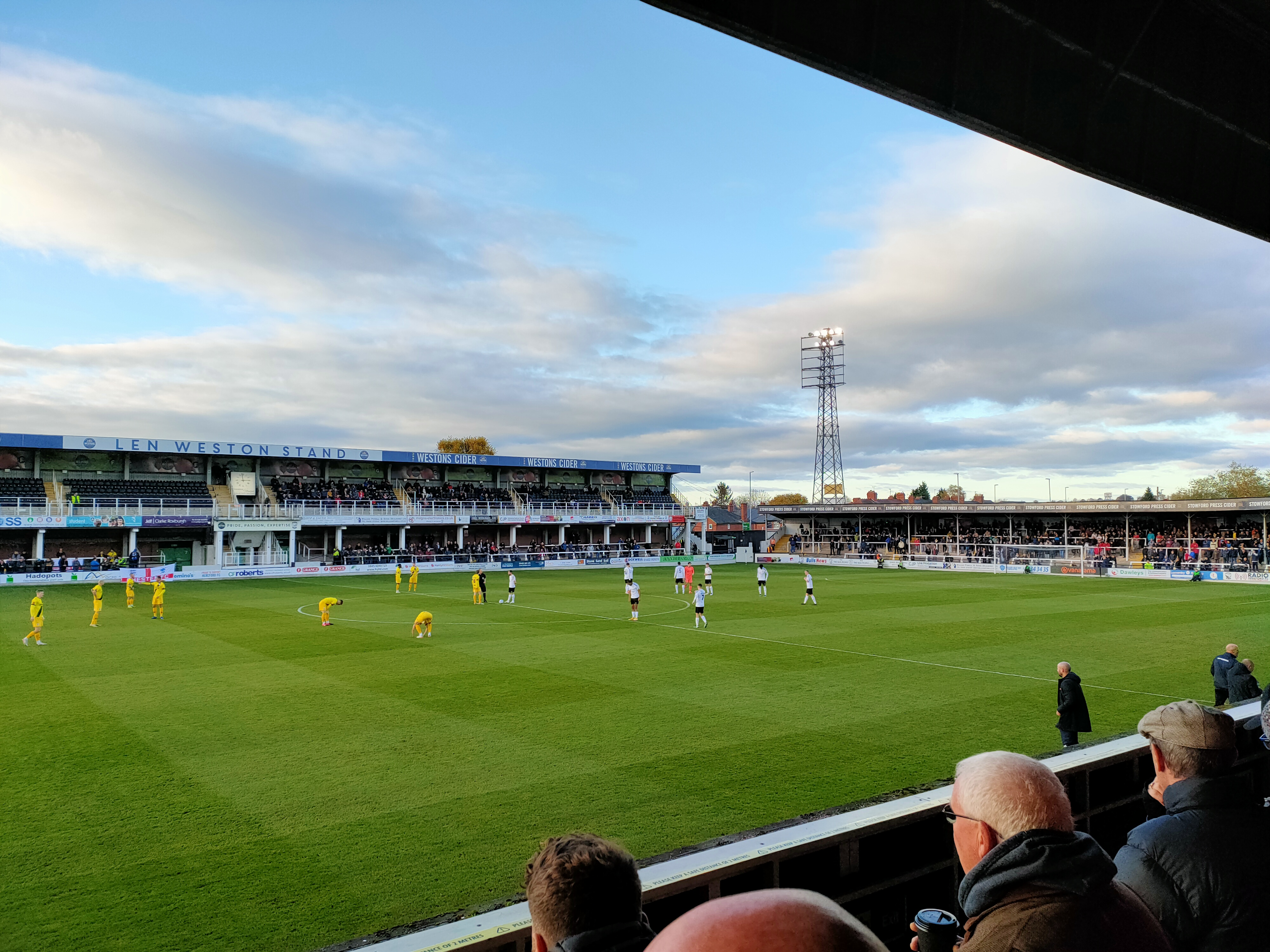
- Edgar Street with the Len Weston stand (opposite) and meadow end (right)
- Interactive map of Edgar Street
- Full name: Edgar Street Athletic Ground
- Location: Hereford, HR4 9JU
- Coordinates: 52°3′39″N 2°43′4″W
- Owner: Hereford FC
- Capacity: 5,250
- Surface: Grass
- Field size: 114 m × 76 m (125 yd × 83 yd)

Construction
- Built: late 19th century
- Opened: late 19th century

Tenants
- Hereford United (1924–2014); Hereford F.C. (2015–present)

Edgar Street, currently known as MandM Edgar Street Stadium for sponsorship reasons, is a football stadium in Hereford and was the home of Hereford United Football Club from the club's formation in 1924 until December 2014, when the club was wound up. It is now the home of Hereford FC, a phoenix club formed to replace the former club. It is the largest football stadium in the county of Herefordshire and is located on the edge of Hereford city centre, adjacent to the former cattle market (now The Old Market). The name of the stadium directly derives from the name of the street where it is located, which is also the A49.

== History ==
The site has been used as a stadium since the late 19th century, although the year in which it was opened has not been widely recorded. The stadium was originally owned by the Hereford Athletic Ground Company and was also used by amateur football side Hereford City. In those days the ground's official name was Edgar Street Athletic Stadium, there was a running track around the pitch which explains the curious curved "dead" areas behind each goal in front of the terraces. Even in the early days Hereford United struggled financially and the landlord obligingly reduced the rent to help the club. In 1931 the stadium was purchased by Hereford City Council for £3,000, and in 1952 United secured a lease on the stadium for the first time.

Although now showing its age, the ground's history does have some notable landmarks, such as the installation of floodlights in March 1953, before many large clubs. In 1974, following the most recent major development seen at Edgar Street, it was the only one outside the First Division with two cantilever-roof stands. At 76 yards (69 m) the ground had, until the advent of new stadia, one of the widest pitches in the Football League. The extreme width of the pitch was created when the old running track was turfed over.

Due to the club's financial crisis in 1997, the lease was handed over to developers. In 2000 an electronic scoreboard was put up at the Blackfriars Street End, using funds bequeathed to the club by a supporter.

On 19 February 2015, Herefordshire County Council rejected a proposal by Worcestershire-based Redditch United to play at Edgar Street. Later that same week, on 24 February, the council confirmed that Hereford FC, a phoenix club formed following Hereford United's demise, had been granted a lease allowing them to play at Edgar Street.

The stadium's record attendance is 18,114 when Hereford United played against Sheffield Wednesday in the 1957–58 FA Cup Third Round.

Hereford FC's record attendance for a home game at Edgar Street was 4,683, for a 1–0 win in the FA Vase semi-finals against Salisbury on 13 March 2016, until the club's FA Cup first round match against Portsmouth in November 2022 attracted a crowd of 4,912. It hosted Hereford FC's televised FA Cup second round replay against Fleetwood Town in December 2017. The 2020–21 FA Trophy semi-final between Hereford FC and Woking was also played here, although it took place behind closed doors due to the COVID-19 pandemic, in which Hereford won 1–0 to make the final.

== Stands ==
=== Merton Stand ===
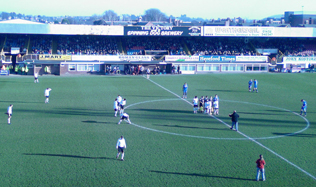
The Merton Stand from the perspective of the Len Weston Stand.

The Merton Stand, on the eastern side of the ground is the only all-seater stand in the ground and was built in 1968. It currently has a capacity of 1818. Initially it was flanked on either side by standing areas known as the Cowsheds, but when the club progressed into the Football League the stand was extended to cover the entire length of the pitch. The Merton Stand is the nominated family stand and includes the director's and press boxes, with matchday sponsors also seated in this stand. In front of the stand lie the dugouts next to the players' tunnel. All of the club facilities, such as offices, changing rooms, boardroom and corporate hospitality are located underneath the stand. The result of this is a number of windows at pitch level.

=== Meadow End ===
The Meadow End is located at the northern end of the ground and is traditionally populated with the club's most vocal supporters. It is a fully covered terrace and has a distinctive curve to its shape. The flat area in front of the terracing enables supporters to stand directly behind the perimeter wall of the pitch, very close to the action. It has a capacity of 1,400. Located behind this end is the substantial Merton Meadow car park.

The pitch's distinctive downhill slope is in the direction of the Meadow End, which has seen some memorable goals over the years, most notably the goals scored by Ronnie Radford and Ricky George in the 1972 FA Cup victory over Newcastle United.

=== Len Weston Stand ===
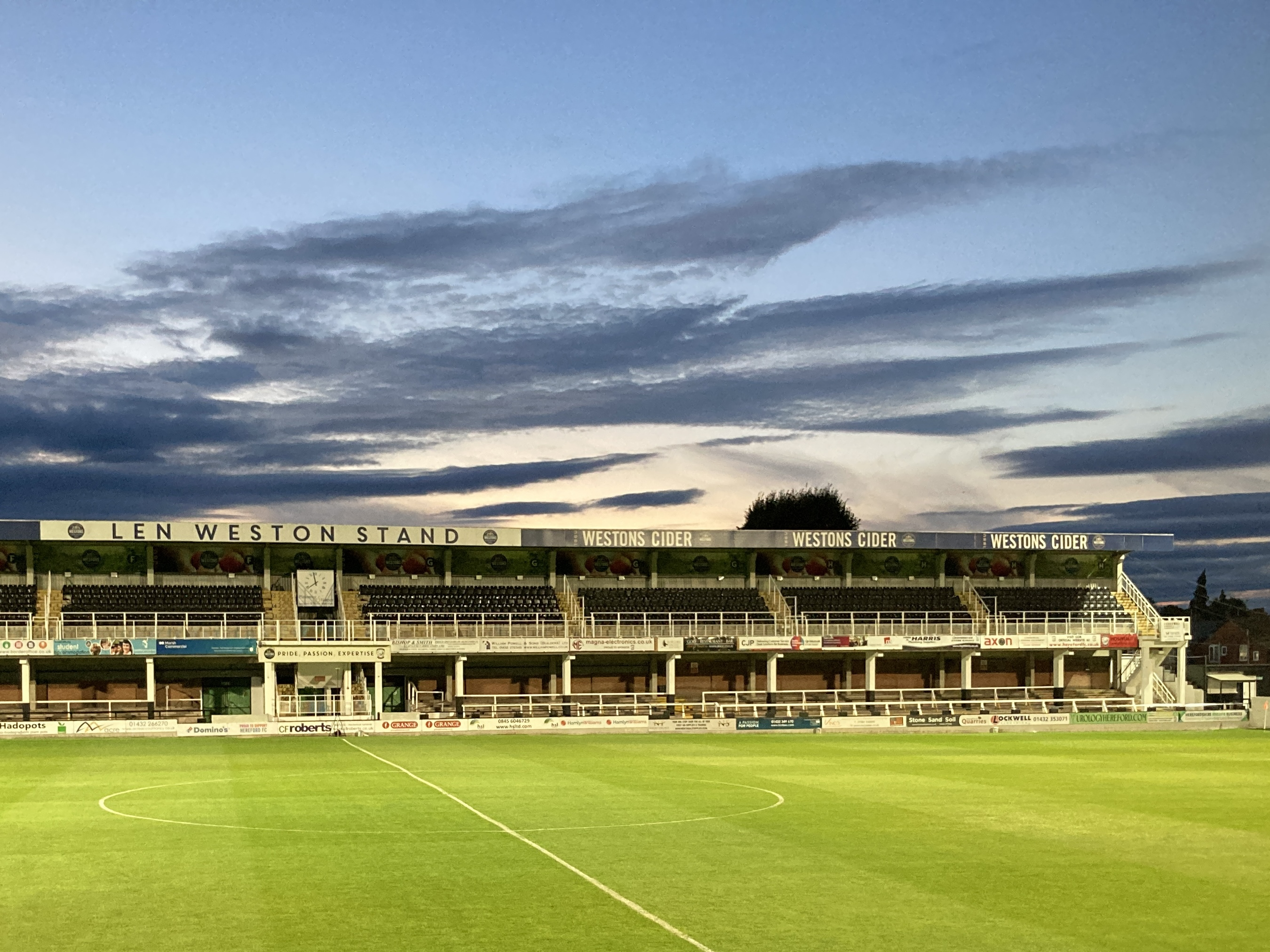
Len Weston Stand

The Len Weston Stand on the western side of the ground, is a narrow two-tiered stand and was built in 1974, replacing the previous wooden grandstand, which was moved to a field near Risbury in the county. The stand has a total capacity of 1996, comprising 936 seats and a further 1,060 standing. It extends the entire length of the pitch and was named after the former president and benefactor of the club, Len Weston and the stand is now sponsored by Weston's Cider.

The stand is unusual in that the lower tier is terraced and the upper tier seated. The upper tier contains just five steep rows of seating but offers perhaps the best view in the ground as it is higher than the Merton Stand, and also closer to the pitch so supporters may not be able to see the front of the pitch, but seating is narrow. The view from the terracing on the lower tier can be obscured by a number of supporting pillars, but also has the benefit of being very close to the touchline. The proximity of the A49 road immediately behind the stand limited the amount of room to build the stand, hence the relatively small number of rows of seating. Ticket allocation is split between home and away supporters with the Meadow End side allocated to home supporters.

=== Blackfriars Street End ===
A terrace situated to the behind the southern goal, the stand was split between home supporters to the east, and away supporters to the west. The stand was popular amongst supporters but had to close its terracing due to health and safety concerns in 2009, then from 2010 to 2012 it adopted temporary seating to accommodate bigger sides in League Two.

In 2023, it was announced that a long term lease had been offered by Herefordshire Council that would allow for the redevelopment of the stand. In March 2024, the Council announced they were seeking bids to begin demolition of the stand in the summer. Work began to demolish the stand in June of 2024.
