= John Motson =

English football commentator (1945–2023)

John Motson OBE
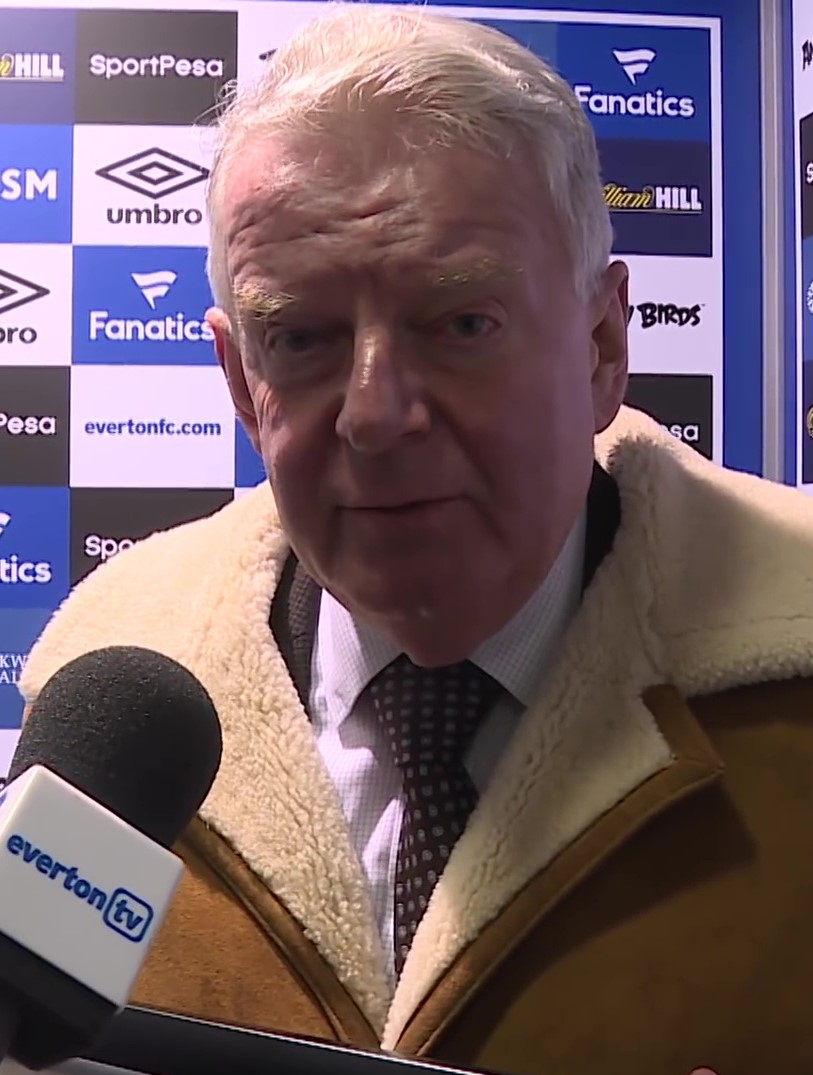
- Motson in 2018
- Born: John Walker Motson; 10 July 1945; Salford, Lancashire, England
- Died: 23 February 2023 (aged 77); Little Brickhill, Buckinghamshire, England
- Other name: Motty
- Education: Culford School, Bury St Edmunds
- Occupation: Football commentator
- Employers: BBC Sport; Talksport
- Spouse: Anne Jobling (m. 1976)
- Children: 1
- Awards: BAFTA Television Special Award (2019)

John Walker Motson OBE (10 July 1945 – 23 February 2023) was an English football commentator. Beginning as a television commentator with the BBC in 1971, he commentated on over 2000 games on television and radio. From the late 1970s to 2008, Motson was the dominant football commentary figure at the BBC, apart from a brief spell in the mid-1990s.

Motson often wore a sheepskin coat (his 'Motty' coat) during winter months after he reportedly "battled horizontal sleet showers ahead of Wycombe Wanderers' FA Cup tie with Peterborough United" in December 1990. These coats became Motson's trademark look, making him instantly recognisable to his audience.

In 2008, Motson announced his retirement from live television commentary. He continued to cover games for Match of the Day highlights and appeared on BBC Radio 5 Live as well as commentating on CBeebies' Footy Pups. In September 2017, he announced his full retirement from BBC commentary, having commentated on 10 FIFA World Cups, 10 UEFA European Championships, and 29 FA Cup finals. In July 2018, he announced he was returning from retirement to work for Talksport. In 2019, Motson provided commentary for the Miniclip mobile game Head Ball 2.

== Early years ==
Motson was born in Salford, Lancashire, where his father was a Methodist minister. He grew up in Lewisham, London, and was baptised in Boston, Lincolnshire, and spent childhood holidays there. As a child, he was a follower of Boston United and recalled the club's victory over Derby County in the FA Cup in 1955.

He was educated at Culford School, near Bury St Edmunds. Culford is a public school where football was generally frowned upon at the time; rugby union, field hockey, and cricket were the main sports for pupils.

In 1963, Motson's career began as a newspaper reporter in Chipping Barnet. In 1967 and 1968, he worked for the Sheffield Morning Telegraph where he first covered football.

== Broadcasting career ==
Motson joined the BBC in 1968 as a sports presenter on Radio 2. His first radio commentary was for a football match between Everton and Derby County in December 1969. In October 1971, he began appearing as a regular commentator with the BBC television programme Match of the Day, his first commentary being a 0–0 draw between Liverpool and Chelsea.

On 5 February 1972, Motson had what he later described as his big breakthrough, when he was assigned to cover an FA Cup replay between Hereford United and Newcastle United for Match of the Day. Newcastle were expected to win easily, but Hereford won in a huge upset. Motson's commentary when Ronnie Radford scored the equalising goal was "Oh what a goal! Radford the scorer. Ronnie Radford! And the crowd are invading the pitch. What a tremendous shot by Ronnie Radford." Motson later described this match as the story of the season. His commentary caused BBC executives to assign him higher-profile TV matches, and he subsequently signed a three-year contract with the broadcaster.

Motson's first FA Cup Final as a commentator was the 1977 match between Manchester United and Liverpool. Motson was drafted in as a late replacement for David Coleman, who was in a contractual dispute with the BBC. When Martin Buchan of Manchester United climbed the steps of Wembley Stadium to receive the trophy, Motson commented that it was "fitting that a man called Buchan should be the first to climb the 39 steps", referring to the novel The Thirty-Nine Steps by Scottish author John Buchan. Between 1979 and 2008 (except 1995 and 1996), Motson commentated on all the FA Cup finals that the BBC covered. In total, Motson covered 29 FA Cup finals.

The BBC stopped broadcasting Match of the Day in 1985 amid an increased appetite for live football rather than highlights, and ITV securing the rights to broadcast the English Football League. Motson continued to commentate regularly, however, as the BBC covered midweek fixtures in European tournaments, and he remained a principal commentator when the Match of the Day show returned in 1992 following the launch of the Premier League.

In April 1989, Motson commentated on the FA Cup semi-final between Liverpool and Nottingham Forest when the Hillsborough disaster occurred. Motson found himself commentating on a tragedy rather than a football match, and he later appeared as a witness at the Hillsborough inquiry.

The BBC lost the right to broadcast Premier League highlights to ITV in 2001, meaning Match of the Day was no longer a weekly schedule fixture. Motson returned to BBC Radio 5 Live for its coverage of the Premier League, although he still commentated for TV for games in which the BBC held rights to. Match of the Day resumed broadcasting the Premier League again in 2004 and returned with it, although he still occasionally commentated for 5 Live up to 2018.

In 2001, speech therapist Jane Comins conducted a voice profile analysis to study the patterns of eight top television and radio commentators. The criteria included pitch, volume, rhythm, and tone, and Comins found that Motson scored the best results. In an accompanying survey of football fans, 32% voted him Britain's favourite commentator.

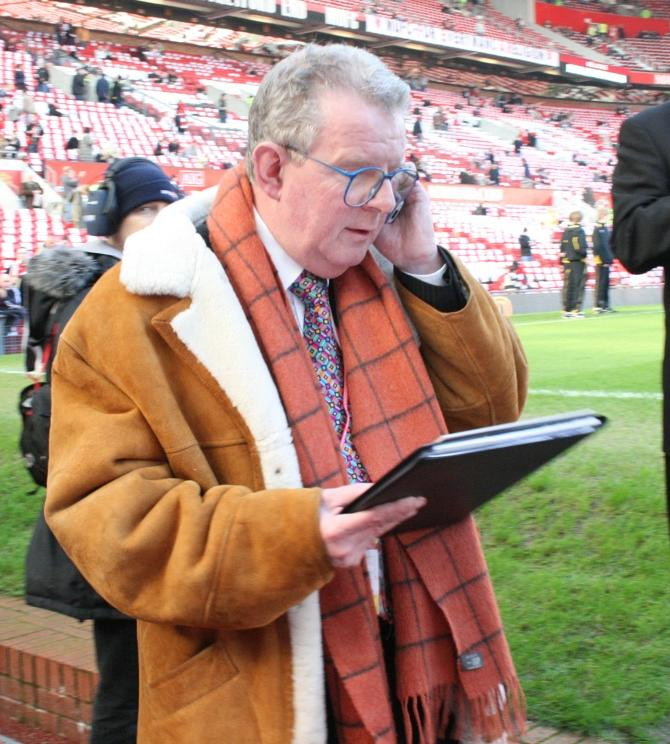
Motson preparing for the Manchester derby at Old Trafford on 10 February 2008.

The BBC lost the rights to cover live FA Cup football in 2008 to Setanta Sports and ITV. Motson attempted to join Setanta, but the BBC refused permission, so he retired from live television commentary. His last live television broadcast was the Euro 2008 final. He continued to cover pre-recorded games for Match of the Day highlights.

Motson covered a total of 10 FIFA World Cups, beginning with the 1978 tournament. One of Motson's memorable World Cup moments came in 1998, when Ronaldo was omitted from the official teamsheet presented to FIFA 72 minutes before the final, only to be later reinstated in a modified teamsheet. Motson described the scenes in Paris as "absolute mayhem and chaos". His final World Cup was in 2010, when he travelled to South Africa as part of the BBC team and appeared as a studio guest on the Match of the Day highlights show, as well as providing reports on the BBC website. Beginning in 2015, Motson provided commentary and narration for the CBeebies football programme Footy Pups. He also covered 10 UEFA European Championships and a total of more than 200 England national team games.

Motson was a commentator for the FIFA video games series by EA Sports, and worked alongside Ally McCoist, Andy Gray, Des Lynam, Mark Lawrenson and Chris Waddle. Motson first joined the franchise for FIFA 96; he and McCoist were replaced by Gray and Clive Tyldesley for FIFA 06 but later returned for FIFA Manager 08.

In September 2017, Motson announced that he would retire from the BBC at the end of the football season. His last live radio commentary was on a match between Arsenal and Watford on 11 March 2018. His final pre-recorded TV commentary was a match between Crystal Palace and West Bromwich Albion and was broadcast on Match of the Day on 13 May 2018.

During the 2018–19 season, Motson appeared in advertisements for gambling company Football INDEX.

== Personal life ==
Motson married Anne Jobling in 1976. They lived in Little Brickhill in Buckinghamshire and had one son, Frederick (born 1986).

In 2012, he stated he was a supporter of Barnet.

Motson was the subject of This Is Your Life in 1996, during which he was surprised by Michael Aspel at a charity event. He also appeared on the BBC Radio 4 biographical programme Great Lives in 2007, in which he nominated Brian Clough as his "great life". On 19 May 2018, BBC Two celebrated Motson's career with an evening featuring three special programmes – Motty Mastermind, Motty – The Man Behind the Sheepskin and Countdown to the Full Motty.

Motson was appointed an Officer of the Order of the British Empire (OBE) in the 2001 Birthday Honours for services to sports broadcasting. He died in his sleep on 23 February 2023, at the age of 77. He had been suffering from bowel cancer since 2014, but whether or not that condition was related to his death has never been confirmed.

== Publications ==
- Motson, John (1972). Second to None: great teams of post-war football. Newton Abbot, Sportsmans Book Club. ISBN 0-7207-0605-X.
- Motson, John (with J. Rowlinson) (1980). History of the European Cup. Queen Anne P. ISBN 0-362-00512-5.
- Motson, John (1996). Motty's Diary: a year in the life of a commentator. London, Virgin Books. ISBN 1-85227-620-7.
- Motson, John (1994). Match of the Day: the complete record. BBC Books. ISBN 978-0-563-37062-8.
- Motson, John (2004). Motty's Year. BBC Books. ISBN 978-0-563-52174-7.
- Motson, John (2004). Motson's National Obsession: The Greatest Football Trivia Book Ever. Sanctuary Publishing Ltd. ISBN 978-1-86074-601-7.
- Motson, John (2005). Motson's FA Cup Odyssey. Robson Books Ltd. ISBN 978-1-86105-903-1.
- Motson, John (2006). Motson's World Cup Extravaganza. Robson Books Ltd. ISBN 978-1-86105-936-9.
- Motson, John (20 May 2010). Motty. Virgin Books. ISBN 978-0-7535-1813-7.
