= Ronnie Radford =

English footballer (1943–2022)

- Radford with Hereford United

Personal information
- Full name: Ronald Radford
- Date of birth: 12 July 1943
- Place of birth: South Elmsall, West Riding of Yorkshire, England
- Date of death: 2 November 2022 (aged 79)
- Position: Midfielder

Senior career*
Years	Team	Apps	(Gls)
1961	Sheffield Wednesday	0	(0)
1961–1962	Leeds United	0	(0)
1962–1965	Cheltenham Town		
1965–1966	Rugby Town		
1966–1969	Cheltenham Town		
1969–1971	Newport County	68	(7)
1971–1974	Hereford United	61	(6)
1974	Worcester City		
1974–????	Bath City		
- Forest Green Rovers

Managerial career
- 1974: Worcester City (player-manager)
- * Club domestic league appearances and goals

Ronald Radford (12 July 1943 – 2 November 2022) was an English footballer who was known for scoring "one of the most iconic goals in FA Cup history", in the 1971–72 FA Cup for Hereford United during their shock 2–1 giant-killing of Newcastle United.

== Career ==
Born in South Elmsall, West Riding of Yorkshire, Radford started his footballing career at Sheffield Wednesday and later Leeds United, but did not make a first team appearance for either club. He joined Cheltenham Town where he was an ever-present in the 1963–64 season, even though he was only a part-time footballer; working during the week as a joiner. He spent one season at Rugby Town before returning to Whaddon Road in 1966. Newport County then paid £1,500 for him in 1969, and in his first season he was voted Player of the Year by the supporters. While at Newport Radford scored a volley from the edge of the box against Bradford Park Avenue, which flew into the top corner. Years later Radford said in an interview that he believed that goal was equally as good a goal as his most famous effort.

Eventually the financial and physical strain of travelling to and from Newport led to Radford moving to a club closer to home. That club was Hereford United. Radford was a regular in the Hereford midfield and was part of the team that went on an incredible cup run, from the Fourth Qualifying Round to the Fourth Round Proper. In the Third Round Hereford met Newcastle United at St James' Park, and the team of part-timers came away with a 2–2 draw, after going 1–0 up in the first minute.

== Newcastle replay ==
The much-postponed replay at Edgar Street was played on a quagmire of a pitch in front of a capacity crowd. The match was being covered by the BBC with a young John Motson commentating. It was originally scheduled for a small slot on Match of the Day later that evening. Newcastle United went 1–0 ahead in the last ten minutes, and with the tie seemingly settled, Radford won a tackle in the Newcastle United half and played a one-two with Brian Owen (who had scored the first goal at Newcastle). The return pass bobbled on the muddy surface but sat up nicely for Radford, and he unleashed a 30-yard strike into the top corner that beat Willie McFaul to equalise. The goal sparked a pitch invasion, and the images of the muddy pitch, Radford celebrating with arms aloft and the crowd invading the pitch, have since become immortalised in FA Cup history.

Radford's goal is sometimes incorrectly attributed as the winning goal; indeed the match actually went to extra time. It was substitute Ricky George who got the winner and wrote his name in the history books alongside Radford, as Hereford held out for an incredible 2–1 victory which is generally considered the greatest FA Cup shock of all time. The BBC quickly switched the match to the feature slot on Match of the Day, and Radford's goal was replayed countless times and was eventually voted Goal of the Season. It was the first goal from the FA Cup to win the Goal of the Season competition. For many years the footage of Radford's wonder goal, coupled with the commentary of John Motson, was part of the Match of the Day opening titles and it arguably launched Motson's career. Described as the FA Cup's greatest ever giant killing Motson believed because of this game he was later given a three-year deal. Motson also believed if Radford had never scored his famous goal he would never have had a TV commentary career. Motson's commentary on the Radford goal:

"Oh what a goal! Radford the scorer. Ronnie Radford! And the crowd are on the pitch. What a tremendous shot by Ronnie Radford".

== Later career ==
After bowing out of the cup to West Ham United, Hereford eventually finished runners-up in the Southern League and were elected to the Football League. Radford stayed at Hereford until July 1974 when he became player-manager at nearby Worcester City. He later played for Bath City and Forest Green Rovers but an Achilles tendon injury ended his playing career. He moved back to Yorkshire to continue his work as a carpenter and joiner, having been a part-time footballer for much of his career.

In 2002, Radford's goal against Newcastle was voted 97th in Channel 4's 100 Greatest Sporting Moments.

== Death ==
Radford died on 2 November 2022, at the age of 79.
