= 2011 in association football =

The following are the association football events of the year 2011 throughout the world.

== Events ==
=== Men ===
- 5 – 17 January — 2011 Nile Basin Tournament in Egypt
  - (gold) Egypt
  - (silver) Uganda
  - (bronze) DR Congo
  - 4th: Kenya
- 7 – 22 January — 2011 African Under-17 Championship in Rwanda
  - (gold) Burkina Faso
  - (silver) Rwanda
  - (bronze) Congo
  - 4th: Ivory Coast
- 7 – 29 January — 2011 AFC Asian Cup in Qatar
  - (gold) Japan
  - (silver) Australia
  - (bronze) South Korea
  - 4th: Uzbekistan
- 23 January – 13 February — 2011 South American Youth Championship in Peru
  - (gold) Brazil
  - (silver) Uruguay
  - (bronze) Argentina
  - 4th: Ecuador
- 8 February – 29 May — 2011 Nations Cup in the Republic of Ireland
  - (gold) Republic of Ireland
  - (silver) Scotland
  - (bronze) Wales
  - 4th: Northern Ireland
- 12 March – 9 April — 2011 South American Under-17 Football Championship in Ecuador
  - (gold) Brazil
  - (silver) Uruguay
  - (bronze) Argentina
  - 4th: Ecuador
- 17 April – 2 May (originally 18 March – 1 April) — 2011 African Youth Championship in South Africa
  - (gold) Nigeria
  - (silver) Cameroon
  - (bronze) Egypt
  - 4th: Mali
- 3 – 15 May — 2011 UEFA European Under-17 Football Championship in Serbia
  - (gold) Netherlands
  - (silver) Germany
- 5 – 25 June — 2011 CONCACAF Gold Cup in the United States
  - (gold) Mexico
  - (silver) United States
- 12 – 25 June — 2011 UEFA European Under-21 Football Championship in Denmark
  - (gold) Spain
  - (silver) Switzerland
  - (bronze) Belarus
  - 4th: Czech Republic
- 17 June – 1 July — 2011 CPISRA Football 7-a-side World Championships in the Netherlands
  - (gold) Russia
  - (silver) Iran
  - (bronze) Ukraine
  - 4th: Brazil
- 18 June – 10 July — 2011 FIFA U-17 World Cup in Mexico
  - (gold) Mexico
  - (silver) Uruguay
  - (bronze) Germany
  - 4th: Brazil
- 1 – 24 July — 2011 Copa América in Argentina
  - (gold) Uruguay
  - (silver) Paraguay
  - (bronze) Peru
  - 4th: Venezuela
- 20 July – 1 August — 2011 UEFA European Under-19 Football Championship in Romania
  - (gold) Spain
  - (silver) Czech Republic
- 29 July – 20 August — 2011 FIFA U-20 World Cup in Colombia
  - (gold) Brazil
  - (silver) Portugal
  - (bronze) Mexico
  - 4th: France
- 30 September – 4 October — 2011 Long Teng Cup in Chinese Taipei
  - (gold) Hong Kong
  - (silver) Philippines
  - (bronze) Chinese Taipei
  - 4th: Macau
- 2 – 11 December — 2011 SAFF Championship in India
  - (gold) India
  - (silver) Afghanistan

=== Women ===
- 2 – 9 March — 2011 Algarve Cup in Portugal
  - (gold) United States
  - (silver) Iceland
  - (bronze) Japan
  - 4th: Sweden
- 30 May – 11 June — 2011 UEFA Women's U-19 Championship in Italy
  - (gold) Germany
  - (silver) Norway
- 26 June – 17 July — 2011 FIFA Women's World Cup in Germany
  - (gold) Japan
  - (silver) United States
  - (bronze) Sweden
  - 4th: France
- 28 – 31 July — 2011 UEFA U-17 Women's Championship in Switzerland
  - (gold) Spain
  - (silver) France
  - (bronze) Germany
  - 4th: Iceland

== News ==
- List of Mexican Football Transfers Winter 2011

=== North American professional expansion ===
In 2011, the major leagues of the men's and women's sport in the United States and Canada each added at least one new team:

- Major League Soccer, the top men's league, added its 17th and 18th teams—the Portland Timbers and Vancouver Whitecaps FC.
- Women's Professional Soccer, which currently has teams only in the U.S., added the Western New York Flash, which plays its home games in Rochester.

=== 2011–12 Russian Premier League ===
The 2011–12 season is a transitional season of the Russian Premier League, as it will stretch over 18 months instead of the conventional 12 months. The unusual length of the season is the result of the decision to adapt the playing year to an autumn-spring rhythm similar to most of the other UEFA leagues.

The season will comprise two phases. The first phase will consist of a regular home-and-away schedule, meaning that each team will play the other teams twice for a total of 30 matches per team. The league will then be split into two groups for the second phase, where each team plays another home-and-away schedule against every other team of its respective group.

The top eight teams of the first phase will compete for the championship and the spots for both the 2012–13 Champions League and Europa League. Accordingly, the bottom eight teams will have to avoid relegation. The bottom two teams of this group will be directly relegated, while the 13th- and 14-placed teams will compete in a relegation/promotion playoff with the third- and fourth-placed teams of the 2011–12 National League Championship.

=== Headlines ===
- 5 January: Kristine Lilly, whose 352 appearances for the US women's national team made her the most-capped player in the sport's history, announced her retirement after an international career that started shortly after her 16th birthday in 1987.
- 31 January: The 4th highest transfer fee in football history (£49.5m) was recorded, when Fernando Torres signed for Chelsea from Liverpool. Andy Carroll's same-day move from Newcastle United to Liverpool for £35m was the eighth highest fee received for a player.
- June: trials started for people allegedly involved in fixing Finnish football matches. One team, Tampere United was indefinitely suspended from Finnish football for accepting payments from a person known for match-fixing.
- June 29: Amid the probes into match fixing, FIFA security chief Chris Eaton stated to the media that FIFA was looking to interview referee Ibrahim Chaibou of Niger, who had oversaw a controversial game between Nigeria and Argentina on June 1 in Abuja. Chaibou was banned for life in November 2019 after the investigation concluded that he had manipulated several results of the matches he officiated.
- 11 September: The first official match of the recently built, 41,000 seated Juventus Stadium, Juventus 4 – 1 Parma, where Stephan Lichtsteiner scored the first goal in the new stadium on the 17th minute.
- 2011 Turkish sports corruption scandal: an ongoing investigation about match fixing, incentive premium, bribery, establishing a criminal organization, organized crime, extortion, threat and intimidation in Turkey's top two association football divisions, the Süper Lig and First League.

=== 61st FIFA Congress ===
The 61st FIFA Congress was held in Zurich, Switzerland between 31 May and 1 June. At the congress, Sepp Blatter was re-elected as the President of FIFA.

== Continental champions ==
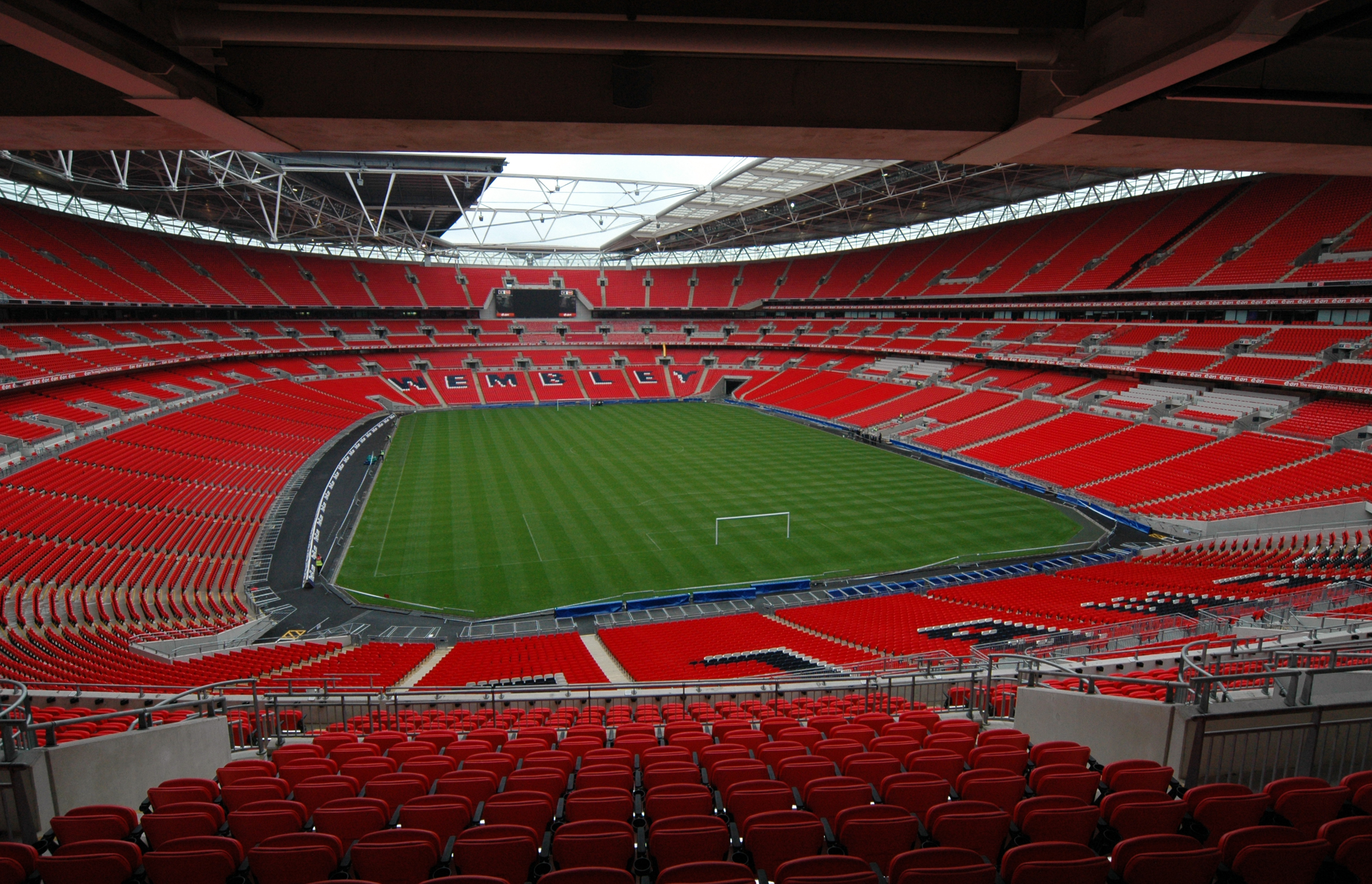
Wembley Stadium, located in London hosted the 2011 UEFA Champions League Final.

Several international continental tournaments were held to determine berths into the 2011 FIFA Club World Cup.

Most notably, FC Barcelona of Spain's La Liga won the 2011 UEFA Champions League Final against Manchester United of the English Premier League 3–1. The UEFA Champions League is considered by some to be the most preeminent club competition in the World, even more so than the Club World Cup, primarily due to the financial strength of European teams in contrast to clubs in the Americas, Asia, Africa and Oceania.

Elsewhere, the 2011 CONCACAF Champions League Finals was historic in the essence that it was the first final in the modern North American champions league-era not to feature an all-Mexican final. Nevertheless, Monterrey of Mexico's Premiera Division won the 2011 title 3–2 on aggregate over Real Salt Lake of the United States' Major League Soccer. Salt Lake became the first American club to reach a Champions League final, as well as the first American side to reach a top-tier North American club championship since Los Angeles Galaxy in 2000.

New Zealander teams continued their dominance in the OFC Champions League as Auckland City won their second OFC Champions League honor against Amicale of Vanuatu's Premia Divisen.

Al-Sadd of the Qatar Stars League won the 2011 AFC Champions League Final against Jeonbuk Hyundai Motors of the Korean K-League 2–2 (4–2 in penalties). Al-Sadd qualified for the FIFA Club World Cup for the first time after winning its second title in Asia.

On 6 November, the 2011 CAF Champions League Final will be contested between Wydad Casablanca of Morocco's Botola and Espérance Tunis of Tunisia's CLP-1. The second leg will be contested on 12 November.

=== List of men champions ===
Region	Tournament	Champion	Title	Last Honor
AFC (Asia)	2011 AFC Champions League	(Qatar) Al-Sadd	2nd	1988–89
AFC (Asia)	2011 AFC Cup	(Uzbekistan) Nasaf Qarshi	1st	N/A
AFC (Asia)	2011 AFC President's Cup	(Chinese Taipei) Taiwan Power Company	1st	N/A
CAF (Africa)	2011 CAF Champions League	(Tunisia) Espérance ST	2nd	1994
CAF (Africa)	2011 CAF Confederation Cup	(Morocco) Maghreb de Fès	1st	N/A
CAF (Africa)	2011 CAF Super Cup	(Democratic Republic of the Congo) TP Mazembe	2nd	2010
CONCACAF (North and Central America, Caribbean)	2010–11 CONCACAF Champions League	(Mexico) Monterrey	1st	N/A
CONCACAF (North and Central America, Caribbean)	2011 CFU Club Championship	Puerto Rico Islanders	2nd	2010
CONMEBOL (South America)	2011 Copa Libertadores	(Brazil) Santos	3rd	1963
CONMEBOL (South America)	2011 Copa Sudamericana	Universidad de Chile	1st	N/A
CONMEBOL (South America)	2011 Recopa Sudamericana	(Brazil) Internacional	2nd	2007
OFC (Oceania)	2010–11 O-League	(New Zealand) Auckland City	2nd	2009
UEFA (Europe)	2010–11 UEFA Champions League	(Spain) Barcelona	4th	2009
UEFA (Europe)	2010–11 UEFA Europa League	(Portugal) Porto	2nd	2003
UEFA (Europe)	2011 UEFA Super Cup	(Spain) Barcelona	4th	2009
FIFA (Worldwide)	2011 FIFA Club World Cup	(Spain) Barcelona	2nd	2009

=== Women ===
Region	Tournament	Champion	Title	Last honor
CONMEBOL (South America)	2011 Copa Libertadores Femenina	(Brazil) São José	1st	
UEFA (Europe)	2010–11 UEFA Women's Champions League	(France) Olympique Lyonnais	1st	

== Domestic champions ==
=== AFC nations ===
Nation	League	Champion	Title	Last honor
Australia	2010–11 A-League	Brisbane Roar	1st	—
Bahrain	2010–11 Bahrain First Division League	Al-Muharraq	32nd	2008–09
Bangladesh	2010–11 Bangladesh League	Sheikh Jamal	1st	—
Cambodia	2011 Cambodian League	Phnom Penh Crown	2nd	2010
China	2011 Chinese Super League	Guangzhou Evergrande	1st	—
Chinese Taipei	2011 Intercity Football League	Taiwan Power Company	3rd	2010
Guam	2011 Guam Men's Soccer League	Cars Plus	1st	—
Hong Kong	2010–11 Hong Kong First Division League	Kitchee	4th	1963–64
India	2010–11 I-League	Salgaocar	2nd	1998–99
Indonesia	2010–11 Indonesia Super League	Persipura Jayapura	2nd	2008–09
Iran	2010–11 Iran Pro League	Sepahan Isfahan	3rd	2009–10
Iraq	2010–11 Iraqi Elite League	Al-Zawraa	12th	2005–06
Japan	2011 J. League Division 1	Kashiwa Reysol	1st	—
Jordan	2010–11 Jordan League	Al-Wehdat	12th	2008–09
North Korea	2011 DPR Korea League	April 25	13th	2010
South Korea	2011 K-League	Jeonbuk Hyundai Motors	2nd	2009
Kuwait	2010–11 Kuwaiti Premier League	Qadsia	14th	2009–10
Kyrgyzstan	2011 Kyrgyzstan League	Dordoi Bishkek	7th	2009
Laos	2011 Lao League	Yotha F.C.	3rd	2003
Lebanon	2010–11 Lebanese Premier League	Al-Ahed	3rd	2009–10
Macau	2011 Campeonato da 1ª Divisão do Futebol	Ka I	2nd	2010
Malaysia	2011 Malaysia Super League	Kelantan	1st	—
Maldives	2011 Dhivehi League	VB Sports Club	3rd	2010
Mongolia	2011 Mongolian Premier League	Ulaanbaatar	1st	—
Myanmar	2011 Myanmar National League	Yangon United	1st	—
Oman	2010–11 Oman Mobile League	Al-Suwaiq	2nd	2009–10
Pakistan	2010–11 Pakistan Premier League	WAPDA	8th	2008
Philippines	2011 United Football League Division 1	Philippine Air Force	2nd	2010
Qatar	2010–11 Qatar Stars League	Lekhwiya	1st	—
Saudi Arabia	2010–11 Saudi Professional League	Al-Hilal	13th	2009–10
Singapore	2011 S.League	Tampines Rovers	3rd	2005
Sri Lanka	2010–11 Sri Lanka Football Premier League	Don Bosco	1st	—
Syria	2010–11 Syrian Premier League	Suspended		
Tajikistan	2011 Tajik League	Istiklol	2nd	2010
Thailand	2011 Thai Premier League	Buriram United	1st	—
Turkmenistan	2011 Ýokary Liga	Balkan	3rd	2010
United Arab Emirates	2010–11 UAE Pro-League	Al Jazira	1st	—
Uzbekistan	2011 Uzbek League	Bunyodkor	4th	2010
Vietnam	2011 V-League	Sông Lam Nghệ An	3rd	2000–01
Yemen	2010–11 Yemeni League	Al-Oruba Zabid	1st	—

=== CAF nations ===
Nation	League	Champion	Title	Last honor
Algeria	2010–11 Algerian Ligue Professionnelle 1	ASO Chlef	1st	—
Angola	2011 Girabola	Recreativo do Libolo	1st	—
Benin	2010–11 Benin Premier League	suspended		
Botswana	2010–11 Botswana Premier League	Township Rollers	11th	2009–10
Burkina Faso	2010–11 Burkinabé Premier League	ASFA Yennenga	11th	2009–10
Burundi	2010–11 Burundi Premier League	Athlético Olympic FC	2nd	2004
Egypt	2010–11 Egyptian Premier League	Al Ahly SC	36th	2009–10
Kenya	2011 Kenyan Premier League	Tusker	9th	2007
Libya	2010–11 Libyan Premier League	Abandoned due to Libyan Civil War		
Mali	2011 Malian Cup	Cercle Olympique	3rd	2002
Morocco	2010–11 Botola	Raja Casablanca	10th	2008–09
Nigeria	2010–11 Nigeria Premier League	Dolphins FC	3rd	2004
Rwanda	2010–11 Rwanda National Football League	APR	12th	2009–10
Somalia	2011 Somali League	Elman	5th	2003
South Africa	2010–11 Premier Soccer League	Orlando Pirates	3rd	2002–03
Sudan	2011 Sudan Premier League	Al-Merrikh	13th	2008
Tunisia	2010–11 Tunisian Ligue Professionnelle 1	Espérance de Tunis	24th	2009–10
Zimbabwe	2011 Zimbabwe Premier Soccer League	Dynamos	19th	2007

- (Cameroon) MTN Elite one: To be determined
- (Cape Verde) Cape Verdean football Championships: To be determined
- Chad Premier League: To be determined
- Comoros Premier League: To be determined
- (Republic of the Congo) Congo Premier League: To be determined
- (Democratic Republic of the Congo) Linafoot: To be determined
- (Ivory Coast) Côte d'Ivoire Premier Division: To be determined
- Djibouti Premier League: To be determined
- (Eritrea) Eritrean Premier League: To be determined
- (Ethiopia) Ethiopian Premier League: To be determined
- Gabon Championnat National D1: To be determined
- (The Gambia) Gambian Championnat National D1: To be determined
- (Ghana) OneTouch Premier League: To be determined
- (Guinea) Guinée Championnat National: To be determined
- (Guinea-Bissau) Campeonato Nacional da Guiné-Bissau: To be determined
- Lesotho Premier League: To be determined
- (Liberia) Liberian Premier League: To be determined
- (Madagascar) THB Champions League: To be determined
- Malawi Premier Division: To be determined
- (Mali) Malien Première Division: To be determined
- (Mauritania) Mauritanean Premier League: To be determined
- (Mauritius) Mauritian League: To be determined
- (Mozambique) Moçambola: To be determined
- Namibia Premier League: To be determined
- Niger Premier League: To be determined
- Réunion Premier League: To be determined
- Senegal Premier League: To be determined
- Seychelles League: To be determined
- Sierra Leone National Premier League: To be determined
- (Eswatini) Swazi Premier League: To be determined
- (Tanzania) Tanzanian Premier League: To be determined
- (Uganda) Ugandan Super League: To be determined
- (Zambia) Zambian Premier League: To be determined
- Zanzibar Premier League: To be determined

=== CONCACAF nations ===
Nation	League	Champion	Title	Last Honor
Anguilla	2010–11 AFA League	Kicks United	2nd	2007
Antigua and Barbuda	2010–11 Antigua and Barbuda Premier Division	Parham FC	4th	2003
Aruba	2010–11 Aruban Division di Honor	Racing Club Aruba	7th	2008
(The Bahamas) Bahamas	2011 BFA Senior League	IM Bears FC	4th	2010
Barbados	2011 Barbados Premier Division	Youth Milan	2nd	2006
Belize	2010–11 Belize Premier Football League	Belize Defence Force	2nd	2010
Bermuda	2010–11 Bermudian Premier Division	North Village Community Club	8th	2006
British Virgin Islands	2011 British Virgin Islands Championship	Islanders FC	2nd	2010
Cayman Islands	2010–11 Cayman Islands League	Elite SC	2nd	2009
Costa Rica	2011 Verano^{[A]}	Alajuelense	25th	2004–05
Costa Rica	2011 Invierno^{[B]}	Alajuelense	26th	2011 Invierno
Cuba	2010–11 Campeonato Nacional de Fútbol de Cuba	Villa Clara	11th	2004
Curaçao	2010–11 Curaçao Sekshon Pagá	Hubentut Fortuna	3rd	2009–10
Dominica	2010–11 Dominica Premier League	Competition not held		
Dominican Republic	2011 Primera División de República Dominicana	Competition not held		
El Salvador	2011 Clausura^{[C]}	Alianza	10th	2004
El Salvador	2011 Apertura^{[D]}	Isidro Metapán	6th	2010
French Guiana	2010–11 French Guiana Championnat National	Matoury	3rd	2006
Grenada	2011 Grenada Premier Division	Hard Rock FC	1st	—
Guadeloupe	2010–11 Guadeloupe Division d'Honneur	Moulien	3rd	2009
Guatemala	2010–11 Liga Nacional de Fútbol de Guatemala	Comunicaciones	24th^{[E]}	2008
Guyana	2011 GFF National Super League	Alpha United	3rd	2010
Haiti	2010–11 1. Ligue Haïtienne	Aigle Noir	4th	1970
Honduras	2010–11 Honduran Liga Nacional	Olimpia	23rd	2010
Jamaica	2010–11 National Premier League	Tivoli Gardens	5th	2009
Martinique	2010–11 Martinique Championnat National	Club Colonial	19th	1972
Mexico	2011 Clausura^{[F]}	UNAM	7th	2009
Mexico	2011 Apertura^{[G]}	UANL	3rd	1981–82
Montserrat	2011 Montserrat Championship	Competition not held		
Nicaragua	2011 Clausura^{[H]}	Real Estelí	10th	2010
Nicaragua	2011 Apertura^{[I]}	Real Estelí	11th	2011
Panama	2011 Clausura^{[J]}	San Francisco	7th	2009
Panama	2011 Apertura^{[K]}	Chorrillo	1st	—
(Saint Kitts and Nevis) St. Kitts and Nevis	2010–11 SKNFA Premier League	St Paul's United	3rd	2009
(Saint Lucia) St. Lucia	2011 Saint Lucia Gold Division	VSADC	7th	2002
(Collectivity of Saint Martin) St. Martin	2010–11 Saint-Martin Championships	Junior Stars	11th	2003
(Saint Vincent and the Grenadines) St. Vincent and the Grenadines	2010–11 NLA Premier League	Avenues United	2nd	2010
Sint Maarten	2010–11 Sint Maarten League	Competition not held		
Suriname	2010–11 Hoofdklasse	Inter Moengotapoe	3rd	2008
Trinidad and Tobago	2010–11 TT Pro League	Defence Force	21st	1999
Turks and Caicos Islands	2010–11 MFL League	Provopool FC	1st	—
United States and Canada	2011 Major League Soccer	Los Angeles Galaxy	3rd	2005
(United States Virgin Islands) U.S. Virgin Islands	2010–11 U.S. Virgin Islands Championship	Competition not held		

=== CONMEBOL nations ===
Nation	League	Champion	Title	Last Honor
Argentina	2010–11 Torneo Clausura	Vélez Sársfield	8th	2009 Clausura
Argentina	2011–12 Torneo Apertura	Boca Juniors	30th	2008 Apertura
Bolivia	2011 Liga de Fútbol Profesional Boliviano	Bolívar	17th	2009 Clausura
Brazil	2011 Campeonato Brasileiro Série A	Corinthians	5th	2005
Chile	2011 Torneo Apertura	Universidad de Chile	13th	2009 Apertura
Chile	2011 Torneo Clausura	Universidad de Chile	14th	2011 Apertura
Colombia	2011 Torneo Apertura	Atlético Nacional	11th	2007 Finalización
Colombia	2011 Torneo Finalización	Junior	7th	2010 Apertura
Ecuador	2011 Campeonato Ecuatoriano de Fútbol Serie A	Deportivo Quito	5th	2009
Paraguay	2011 Torneo Apertura	Nacional (Paraguay)	8th	2009 Clausura
Paraguay	2011 Torneo Clausura	Olimpia	39th	2000
Peru	2011 Torneo Descentralizado	Juan Aurich	1st	—
Uruguay	2010–11 Uruguayan Primera División	Nacional (Uruguay)	43rd	2008–09
Venezuela	2010–11 Venezuelan Primera División	Deportivo Táchira	7th	2007–08

=== OFC nations ===
- (American Samoa) FFAS Senior League: Pago Youth
- Cook Islands Round Cup: Tupapa Maraerenga
- (Fiji) Fijian National Football League: Ba FC
- (Federated States of Micronesia) FSMFA Top League: Not known
- Kiribati National Championship: Not held
- New Caledonia Division Honneur: AS Mont-Dore
- (New Zealand) ASB Premiership: Waitakere United
- Niue Soccer Tournament: Vaiea Sting
- Norfolk Island Soccer League: Not known
- Palau Soccer League: Not held
- Papua New Guinea National Soccer League: Hekari United
- Samoa National League: Kiwi FC
- Solomon Islands National Club Championship: Koloale FC
- (French Polynesia) Tahiti Division Fédérale: AS Tefana
- Tonga Major League: SC Lotoha'apai
- Tuvalu A-Division: Nauti FC
- Vanuatu Premia Divisen: Amicale FC

=== UEFA nations ===
Nation	League	Champion	Title	Last Honor	Ref.
Albania	2010–11 Albanian Superliga	Skënderbeu Korçë	2nd	1933	
Andorra	2010–11 Primera Divisió	FC Santa Coloma	6th	2009–10	
Armenia	2011 Armenian Premier League	Ulisses	1st	—	
Austria	2010–11 Austrian Football Bundesliga	Sturm Graz	3rd	1998–99	
Azerbaijan	2010–11 Azerbaijan Premier League	Neftchi Baku	6th	2004–05	
Belarus	2011 Belarusian Premier League	BATE Borisov	8th	2010	
Belgium	2010–11 Jupiler League	Genk	3rd	2001–02	
Bosnia and Herzegovina	2010–11 Premijer Liga	Borac Banja Luka	1st	—	
Bulgaria	2010–11 A PFG	Litex Lovech	4th	2009–10	
Croatia	2010–11 Prva HNL	Dinamo Zagreb	13th^{[A]}	2009–10	
Cyprus	2010–11 Cypriot First Division	APOEL	21st	2008–09	
Czech Republic	2010–11 Gambrinus liga	Viktoria Plzeň	1st	—	
Denmark	2010–11 Danish Superliga	Copenhagen	9th	2009–10	
England	2010–11 Premier League	Manchester United	19th^{[B]}	2008–09	
Estonia	2011 Meistriliiga	Flora Tallinn	9th	2010	
Faroe Islands	2011 Vodafonedeildin	B36 Tórshavn	8th	2005	
Finland	2011 Veikkausliiga	HJK Helsinki	24th	2010	
France	2010–11 Ligue 1	Lille	3rd	1953–54	
(Georgia (country)) Georgia	2010–11 Umaglesi Liga	Zestaponi	1st	—	
Germany	2010–11 Fußball-Bundesliga	Borussia Dortmund	7th	2001–02	
Greece	2010–11 Super League Greece	Olympiacos	38th	2008–09	
Hungary	2010–11 NB I	Videoton	1st	—	
Iceland	2011 Úrvalsdeild	KR Reykjavík	25th	2003	
(Republic of Ireland) Ireland	2011 League of Ireland	Shamrock Rovers	17th	2010	
Israel	2010–11 Israeli Premier League	Maccabi Haifa	12th^{[C]}	2008–09	
Italy	2010–11 Serie A	Milan	18th	2003–04	
Kazakhstan	2011 Kazakhstan Premier League	Shakhter Karagandy	1st	—	
Latvia	2011 Latvian Higher League	Ventspils	4th	2008	
Lithuania	2011 A Lyga	Ekranas	6th^{[D]}	2010	
Luxembourg	2010–11 Luxembourg National Division	F91 Dudelange	9th	2008–09	
(North Macedonia) Macedonia	2010–11 Macedonian Prva Liga	Škendija	1st	—	
Malta	2010–11 Maltese Premier League	Valletta	20th	2007–08	
Moldova	2010–11 Moldovan National Division	Dacia Chişinău	1st	—	
Montenegro	2010–11 Montenegrin First League	Mogren	2nd	2008–09	
Netherlands	2010–11 Eredivisie	Ajax	30th	2003–04	
Northern Ireland	2010–11 IFA Premiership	Linfield	50th	2009–10	
Norway	2011 Tippeligaen	Molde	1st	—	
Poland	2010–11 Ekstraklasa	Wisła Kraków	14th	2008–09	
Portugal	2010–11 Primeira Liga	Porto	25th	2008–09	
Romania	2010–11 Liga I	Oţelul Galaţi	1st	—	
Russia	did not held				
San Marino	2010–11 Campionato Sammarinese di Calcio	Tre Fiori	7th	2009–10	
Scotland	2010–11 Scottish Premier League	Rangers	54th	2009–10	
Serbia	2010–11 Serbian Superliga	Partizan	4th	2009–10	
Slovakia	2010–11 Slovak Superliga	Slovan Bratislava	6th	2008–09	
Slovenia	2010–11 Slovenian PrvaLiga	Maribor	9th	2008–09	
Spain	2010–11 La Liga	Barcelona	21st	2009–10	
Sweden	2011 Allsvenskan	Helsingborg	7th	1999	
Switzerland	2010–11 Swiss Super League	Basel	14th	2009–10	
Turkey	2010–11 Süper Lig	Fenerbahçe	18th	2010–11	
Ukraine	2010–11 Ukrainian Premier League	Shakhtar Donetsk	6th	2009–10	
Wales	2010–11 Welsh Premier League	Bangor City	3rd	1994–95	

== Cup champions ==
=== AFC ===
Nation	Domestic Cup	Winner	Runner-up	Title	Last Honor
China	2011 Chinese FA Cup	Tianjin Teda	Shandong Luneng Taishan	1st	—
Guam	2011 Guam FA Cup	Quality Distributors	Cars Plus FC	3rd	2009
Japan	2011 Emperor's Cup	FC Tokyo	Kyoto Sanga	1st	—
Japan	2011 J.League Cup	Kashima Antlers	Urawa Red Diamonds	4th	2002
Saudi Arabia	2010–11 Saudi Crown Prince Cup	Al-Hilal	Al-Wehda	10th	2009–10
South Korea	2011 Korean FA Cup	Seongnam Ilhwa Chunma	Suwon Samsung Bluewings	2nd	1999

=== CAF ===
Nation	Domestic Cup	Winner	Runner-up	Title	Last Honor
Benin	2011 Benin Cup	Dragons de l'Ouémé	Association Sportive Oussou Saka	6th	2006
Burkina Faso	2011 Coupe de Faso	Étoile Filante Ouagadougou	AS SONABEL	20th	2008
Burundi	2011 Coupe du Président de la République	LLB Académic	Athlético Olympic FC	1st	—
Egypt	2010–11 Egypt Cup	ENPPI	Zamalek	2nd	2004–05
Mali	2011 Malian Cup	Cercle Olympique	Stade Malien	3rd	2002
Nigeria	2011 Nigeria Federation Cup	Heartland F.C.	Enyimba F.C.	1st	—
Kenya	2011 FKF Cup	Gor Mahia	Sofapaka	9th	2008
Rwanda	2011 Rwandan Cup	APR	Police FC Kibungo	6th	2010
South Africa	2010–11 Nedbank Cup	Orlando Pirates	Black Leopards	7th	1996

=== CONCACAF ===
Nation	Domestic Cup	Winner	Runner-up	Title	Last Honor
Canada	2011 Canadian Championship	Toronto FC	Vancouver Whitecaps FC	3rd	2010
Suriname	2010–11 Surinamese Cup	SV Notch	Walking Boyz Company	1st	—
Trinidad and Tobago	2010–11 Trinidad and Tobago FA Trophy	San Juan Jabloteh	North East Stars	3rd	2005
United States	2011 Lamar Hunt U.S. Open Cup	Seattle Sounders FC	Chicago Fire	3rd	2010

=== CONMEBOL ===
Nation	Domestic Cup	Winner	Runner-up	Title	Last Honor
Brazil	2011 Copa do Brasil	Vasco da Gama	Coritiba	1st	—
Chile	2011 Copa Chile	Universidad Católica	Magallanes	4th	1995
Colombia	2011 Copa Colombia	Millonarios	Boyacá Chicó	2nd	1963
Peru	2011 Torneo Intermedio	José Gálvez	Sport Áncash	1st	—
Venezuela	2011 Copa Venezuela	AC Mineros	Trujillanos FC	2nd	1985

=== OFC ===
Nation	Domestic Cup	Winner	Runner-up	Title	Last Honor
New Zealand	2011 Chatham Cup	Wairarapa United	Napier City Rovers	1st	—

=== UEFA ===
Nation	Domestic Cup	Winner	Runner-up	Title	Last Honor
Albania	2010–11 Albanian Cup	Tirana	Dinamo Tirana	14th	2005–06
Austria	2010–11 Austrian Cup	SV Ried	Austria Lustenau	2nd	1997–98
Belgium	2010–11 Belgian Cup	Standard Liège	Westerlo	6th	1992–93
Bosnia and Herzegovina	2010–11 Bosnia and Herzegovina Football Cup	Željezničar	Čelik	4th	2002–03
Bulgaria	2010–11 Bulgarian Cup	CSKA Sofia	Slavia Sofia	19th	2005–06
Croatia	2010–11 Croatian Football Cup	Dinamo Zagreb	Varaždin	11th	2008–09
Czech Republic	2010–11 Czech Cup	Mladá Boleslav	Sigma Olomouc	1st	—
Denmark	2010–11 Danish Cup	FC Nordsjælland	FC Midtjylland	2nd	2009–10
England	2010–11 FA Cup	Manchester City	Stoke City	5th	1968–69
England	2010–11 Football League Cup	Birmingham City	Arsenal	2nd	1962–63
Finland	2011 Finnish Cup	HJK Helsinki	KuPS Kuopio	11th	2008
France	2010–11 Coupe de France	Lille	Paris Saint-Germain	6th	1954–55
France	2010–11 Coupe de la Ligue	Marseille	Montpellier	3rd	2009–10
Germany	2010–11 DFB-Pokal	Schalke 04	MSV Duisburg	5th	2001–02
Greece	2010–11 Greek Cup	AEK Athens	Atromitos	14th	2001–02
Hungary	2010–11 Magyar Kupa	Kecskemét	Videoton	1st	—
(Republic of Ireland) Ireland	2011 FAI Cup	Sligo Rovers	Shelbourne	4th	2010
(Republic of Ireland) Ireland	2011 League of Ireland Cup	Derry City	Cork City	10th	2008
Italy	2010–11 Coppa Italia	Internazionale	Palermo	7th	2009–10
(Liechtenstein) Lichtenstein	2010–11 Liechtenstein Cup	FC Vaduz	USV Eschen/Mauren	39th	2009–10
Montenegro	2010–11 Montenegrin Cup	FK Rudar	Mogren	3rd	2009–10
Netherlands	2010–11 KNVB Cup	Twente	Ajax	3rd	2000–01
Northern Ireland	2010–11 Irish Cup	Linfield	Crusaders	41st	2009–10
Northern Ireland	2010–11 Irish League Cup	Lisburn Distillery	Portadown	1st	—
Norway	2011 Norwegian Cup	Aalesund	Brann	2nd	2009
Poland	2010–11 Polish Cup	Legia Warsaw	Lech Poznań	14th	2007–08
Portugal	2010–11 Taça de Portugal	Porto	Vitória de Guimarães	16th	2009–10
Portugal	2010–11 Taça da Liga	Benfica	Paços de Ferreira	3rd	2009–10
Romania	2010–11 Cupa României	Steaua București	Dinamo București	21st	1998–99
Russia	2010–11 Russian Cup	CSKA Moscow	Alania Vladikavkaz	11th	2008–09
Scotland	2010–11 Scottish Cup	Celtic	Motherwell	35th	2006–07
Scotland	2010–11 Scottish League Cup	Rangers	Celtic	27th	2009–10
Serbia	2010–11 Serbian Cup	Partizan	Vojvodina	3rd	2008–09
Slovakia	2010–11 Slovak Cup	Slovan Bratislava	Žilina	12th	2009–10
Slovenia	2010–11 Slovenian Cup	Domžale	Maribor	1st	—
Spain	2010–11 Copa del Rey	Real Madrid	Barcelona	18th	1992–93
Sweden	2011 Svenska Cupen	Helsingborg	Kalmar	5th	2010
Switzerland	2010–11 Swiss Cup	FC Sion	Neuchâtel Xamax	12th	2008–09
Turkey	2010–11 Turkish Cup	Beşiktaş	İstanbul Başakşehir	9th	2008–09
Ukraine	2010–11 Ukrainian Cup	Shakhtar Donetsk	Dynamo Kyiv	7th	2007–08
Wales	2010–11 Welsh Cup	Llanelli Town	Bangor City	1st	—
Wales	2010–11 Welsh League Cup	The New Saints	Llanelli	5th	2009–10

== Deaths ==
=== January ===
- 1 January – Nikolay Abramov, Russian defender (26)
- 4 January – Coen Moulijn, Dutch international forward (73)
- 6 January – Uche Okafor, Nigerian international defender (43)
- 8 January – Josep Artigas, Spanish international midfielder (87)
- 8 January – Ángel Pedraza, Spanish midfielder and manager (48)
- 8 January – Thorbjørn Svenssen, Norwegian international defender (86)
- 9 January – Richard Butcher, English midfielder (29)
- 9 January – Jerzy Woźniak, Polish international defender (78)
- 10 January – Bora Kostić, Yugoslavian international striker (80)
- 13 January – Charles Muscat, Maltese footballer (48)
- 15 January – Nat Lofthouse, English international forward (85)
- 16 January – Alcides Silveira, Uruguayan international midfielder (72)
- 19 January – Mihai Ionescu, Romanian footballer (74)
- 21 January – Wally Hughes, English football coach (76)
- 24 January – Alec Boden, Scottish footballer (85)
- 24 January – Francisco Hernández, Mexican international midfielder, member of the 1950 FIFA World Cup Mexico squad (83)
- 25 January – Kiril Milanov, Bulgarian international forward (62)
- 25 January – Bill Holden, English footballer (82)
- 27 January – Svein Mathisen, Norwegian international midfielder (58)
- 29 January – Corona, Spanish defender (92)
- 29 January – Norman Wilkinson, English footballer (79)
- 31 January – Norman Uprichard, Northern Irish footballer (82)

=== February ===
- 1 February – Les Stubbs, English footballer (81)
- 2 February – Jimmy Fell, English footballer (75)
- 3 February – Neil Young, English forward (66)
- 6 February – William Morais, Brazilian midfielder (19)
- 6 February – Billy Gallier, English footballer (78)
- 7 February – Eric Parsons, English footballer (87)
- 11 February – Josef Pirrung, German footballer (61)
- 14 February – Peter Feteris, Dutch footballer (58)
- 16 February – Tonny van Ede, Dutch international winger (86)
- 17 February – George Clarke, English footballer (89)
- 19 February – Ernő Solymosi, Hungarian international defender (70)
- 19 February – Norman Corner, English footballer (68)
- 20 February – Tony Kellow, English footballer (58)
- 21 February – Jean Baeza, French international defender (68)
- 22 February – Ivo Pavelić, Croatian footballer (103)
- 24 February – Yozhef Betsa, Soviet Ukrainian midfielder, 1956 Olympic champion (81)
- 26 February – Kostas Andriopoulos, Greek footballer (26)
- 26 February – Dean Richards, English defender (36)
- 26 February – Jorge Santoro, Brazilian footballer
- 28 February – Jan van Schijndel, Dutch footballer (83)

=== March ===
- 5 March – Viktor Voroshilov, Soviet footballer (84)
- 6 March – Ján Popluhár, Slovak footballer (75)
- 6 March – Reg Stewart, English footballer (85)
- 7 March – Adrián Escudero, Spanish footballer (83)
- 7 March – Vladimir Brazhnikov, Russian footballer (69)
- 8 March – Masoud Boroumand, Iranian footballer (82)
- 10 March – Danny Paton, Scottish footballer (75)
- 19 March – Barrington Gaynor, Jamaican footballer (45)
- 20 March – Néstor de Vicente, Argentine footballer (46)
- 21 March – Jesús Aranguren, Spanish defender and coach (66)
- 21 March – Ladislav Novák, Czech footballer (79)
- 21 March – Hans Boskamp, Dutch footballer (78)
- 22 March – Patrick Doeplah, Liberian footballer (22)
- 22 March – José Soriano, Peruvian footballer (93)
- 23 March – Trevor Storton, English footballer (61)
- 26 March – František Havránek, Czech football manager (87)
- 31 March – Oddvar Hansen, Norwegian footballer (89)

=== April ===
- 3 April – Yevgeny Lyadin, Russian footballer (84)
- 4 April – John Niven, Scottish footballer (89)
- 4 April – Juan Tuñas, Cuban footballer (93)
- 6 April – Jim Blair, Scottish footballer (64)
- 6 April – John Morris, English footballer (87)
- 10 April – Mikhail Rusyayev, Russian footballer (46)
- 11 April – Jimmy Briggs, Scottish footballer (74)
- 11 April – Billy Gray, English footballer (83)
- 11 April – Doug Newlands, Scottish footballer (79)
- 12 April – Ronnie Coyle – Scottish footballer (46)
- 12 April – Robert Lokossimbayé, Chadian footballer (35)
- 18 April – Olubayo Adefemi, Scottish footballer (25)
- 20 April – Allan Brown, Scottish footballer (84)
- 16 April – Chinesinho, Brazilian midfielder, winner of the 1966–67 Serie A. (75)
- 22 April – Cheung Sai Ho, Hong Kong international midfielder. (35)
- 22 April – Wiel Coerver, Dutch footballer (86)
- 28 April – Willie O'Neill, Scottish footballer (70)
- 30 April – Eddie Turnbull, Scottish footballer (88)

=== May ===
- 2 May – Eddie Lewis, English footballer (76)
- 2 May – Shigeo Yaegashi, Japanese footballer (78)
- 4 May – Sammy McCrory, Northern Irish footballer (86)
- 5 May – Yosef Merimovich, Israeli footballer (86)
- 5 May – Tomm Wright, Scottish footballer (83)
- 6 May – Yoon Ki-won, South Korean footballer (23)
- 11 May – Glyn Williams, Welsh footballer (92)
- 14 May – Ernie Walker, Scottish football administrator (82)
- 17 May – Frank Upton, English footballer (76)
- 22 May – Alexandru Ene, Romanian footballer (82)
- 22 May – Nasser Hejazi, Iranian goalkeeper and coach (61)
- 25 May – Miroslav Opsenica, Serbian footballer (29)
- 28 May – Hermann Bley, German footballer (75)
- 29 May – Billy Crook, English footballer (84)
- 30 May – Jung Jong-kwan, South Korean footballer (29)
- 30 May – Eddie Morrison, Scottish footballer (63)

=== June ===
- 2 June – Willie Phiri, Zambian footballer (57)
- 5 June – Célestin Oliver, French footballer (80)
- 8 June – Nasir Jalil, Zambian footballer (56)
- 9 June – Josip Katalinski, Bosnian footballer (63)
- 18 June – Echendu Adiele, Nigerian footballer (32)
- 18 June – Ulrich Biesinger, German international forward (77)
- 20 June – Vladimir Pettay, Russian football referee (38)
- 22 June – Albert Johnson, English footballer (80)
- 22 June – Coşkun Özarı, Turkish footballer (80)
- 23 June – Dennis Marshall, Costa Rican international defender (25)
- 24 June – Tomislav Ivić, Croatian footballer (77)
- 26 June – Jung Jung-suk South Korean footballer (28)
- 26 June – Jan van Beveren, Dutch footballer (63)
- 27 June – Ken Bainbridge, English footballer (90)
- 27 June – Mike Boyle, English footballer (64)
- 28 June – Giorgio Bernardin, Italian footballer (83)
- 29 June – Carlos Diarte, Paraguayan footballer (57)

=== July ===
- 1 July – Wille Fernie, Scottish footballer (82)
- 16 July – Bertalan Bicskei, Hungarian footballer (66)
- 16 July – Charlie Woollett, English footballer (91)
- 17 July – Juan Arza, Spanish international forward and manager (88)
- 17 July – Ștefan Sameș, Romanian footballer (59)
- 18 July – Salvador Bernárdez, Honduran footballer
- 22 July – Cees de Wolf, Dutch footballer (65)
- 26 July – Jacques Fatton, Swiss footballer (85)
- 31 July – Andrea Pazzagli, Italian footballer (51)

=== August ===
- 4 August – Naoki Matsuda, Japanese international defender (34)
- 5 August – Stan Willemse, English footballer (86)
- 6 August – Kuno Klötzer, German footballer (89)
- 7 August – Eddie Gibbins, English footballer (85)
- 11 August – Mark Sinyangwe, Zambian footballer (31)
- 11 August – Ignacio Flores, Mexican international defender (58)
- 13 August – Álvaro Lara, Chilean footballer (26)
- 14 August – Fritz Korbach, German footballer (66)
- 15 August – Nenad Bijedić, Bosnian football manager (51)
- 16 August – Frank Munro, Scottish footballer (63)
- 19 August – Yevhen Yevseyev, Ukrainian footballer (24)
- 21 August – Ezra Sued, Argentine footballer (88)
- 22 August – Žarko Nikolić, Serbian footballer (72)
- 24 August – George Knight, English footballer (90)
- 24 August – Alfons Van Brandt, Belgian footballer (84)
- 27 August – John Parke, Northern Irish footballer (74)
- 28 August – Bernie Gallacher, Scottish footballer (44)
- 29 August – Mark Ovendale, English footballer (37)
- 30 August – João Carlos Batista Pinheiro, Brazilian footballer (79)

=== September ===
- 5 September – Robert Ballaman, Swiss footballer (85)
- 6 September – Masanori Sanada, Japanese international goalkeeper (43)
- 9 September – Laurie Hughes, English footballer (87)
- 11 September – Ralph Gubbins, English footballer (79)
- 17 September – Ferenc Szojka, Hungarian footballer (80)
- 20 September – Aleksei Mamykin, Russian footballer (75)
- 25 September – Theyab Awana, UAE international winger (21)
- 25 September – Norman Lawson English footballer
- 27 September – Chus Pereda, Spanish international midfielder and manager (73)
- 30 September – Mykhaylo Forkash, Ukrainian footballer (63)

=== October ===
- 3 October – Zakaria Zerouali, Moroccan footballer (33)
- 5 October – Edward Acquah, Ghanaian footballer (76)
- 5 October – Níver Arboleda, Colombian footballer (43)
- 5 October – Richard Holmlund, Swedish football manager (47)
- 7 October – Julien Bailleul, French footballer (23)
- 11 October – Henk Hofs, Dutch footballer (60)
- 11 October – Derrick Ward, English footballer (76)
- 19 October – Édison Chará, Colombian footballer (31)
- 23 October – Winston Griffiths, Jamaican footballer (33)
- 25 October – Leonidas Andrianopoulos, Greek footballer (100)
- 31 October – Flórián Albert, Hungarian striker (70)

=== November ===
- 8 November – Jimmy Adamson, English footballer (82)
- 8 November – Valentin Ivanov, Russian footballer (76)
- 9 November – Ézio Leal Moraes Filho, Brazilian footballer (45)
- 12 November – Alun Evans (FAW), Welsh footballer administrator (69)
- 13 November – Bobsam Elejiko, Nigerian footballer (30)
- 14 November – Alf Fields, English footballer (92)
- 16 November – Djamel Keddou, Algerian footballer (59)
- 18 November – Jones Mwewa, Zambian footballer (38)
- 19 November – Karl Aage Præst, Danish footballer (89)
- 20 November – David Cargill, English footballer (75)
- 20 November – Mario Martiradonna, Italian footballer (73)
- 21 November – Jim Lewis, English footballer (84)
- 22 November – Pío Corcuera, Argentine footballer (90)
- 23 November – Henry Øberg, Norwegian football referee (80)
- 24 November – Humberto Medina, Mexican footballer (69)
- 24 November – Johnny Williams, English footballer (76)
- 26 November – István Gajda, Hungarian footballer (30)
- 27 November – Gary Speed, Welsh international midfielder and manager (42)
- 28 November – Aruwa Ameh, Nigerian footballer (20)

=== December ===
- 1 December – Hippolyte Van den Bosch, Belgian footballer (85)
- 2 December – Artur Quaresma, Portuguese footballer (94)
- 4 December – Sócrates, Brazilian international midfielder (57)
- 5 December – Gennady Logofet, Russian footballer (69)
- 6 December – Lawrie Tierney, Scottish footballer (52)
- 7 December – Peter Croker, English footballer (89)
- 8 December – Peter Brown, English footballer (77)
- 8 December – Vinko Cuzzi, Croatian footballer (71)
- 8 December – Giorgio Mariani, Italian footballer (65)
- 9 December – Len Phillips, English footballer (89)
- 10 December – Hamilton Bobby, Indian footballer
- 13 December – Klaus-Dieter Sieloff, German international footballer (69)
- 14 December – Pedro Febles, Venezuelan footballer (53)
- 19 December – Luciano Magistrelli, Italian footballer (73)
- 19 December – Héctor Núñez, Uruguayan footballer (75)
- 23 December – Neil Davids, English footballer (56)
- 25 December – Christophe Laigneau, French footballer (46)
- 25 December – George Robb, English footballer (85)
- 27 December – Catê, Brazilian footballer (38)
- 29 December – Ron Howells, Welsh footballer (84)
- 29 December – Ked Johnson, English footballer (80)
- 31 December – Roy Greenwood, English footballer (80)
