= 2011 in CONCACAF =

The year of 2011 in CONCACAF marked the 48th year of CONCACAF competitions.

== Events ==
=== Men ===
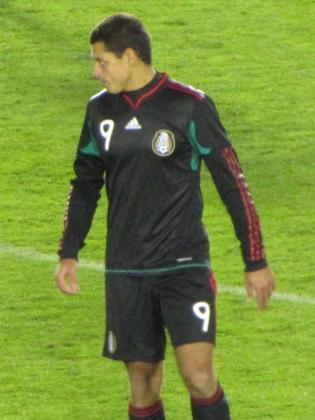
Javier Hernandez, of Mexico, earned the Golden boot in the 2011 Gold Cup, scoring seven goals in the tournament, including a hat trick against El Salvador.

From 5 June through 25 June, CONCACAF hosted its eleventh biannual regional tournament, the CONCACAF Gold Cup. Hosted in the United States, it was the fourth-consecutive tournament that the Gold Cup was solely held in the United States. The Gold Cup saw Mexico earn their sixth Gold Cup honor, by defeating tournament hosts, and longtime rivals, the United States, by a 4–2 scoreline. The Mexican team earned their way into the finals through the virtue of winning Group A with a perfect 3–0–0 record, prior to defeating Guatemala and Honduras in the quarterfinals and semifinals, respectively. The U.S. team, finished as runners-up in 2011 CONCACAF Gold Cup Group C after posting a record of two wins, a loss and no draws. In the knockout stage, the U.S. defeated Group B winners, Jamaica by 2–0 scoreline, before defeating Group C winners, Panama 1–0 in the semifinals.

- 18 June – 10 July — 2011 FIFA U-17 World Cup in Mexico
  - (gold) Mexico
  - (silver) Uruguay
  - (bronze) Germany
  - 4th: Brazil

=== Women ===
- 2 – 9 March — 2011 Algarve Cup in Portugal
  - (gold) United States
  - (silver) Iceland
  - (bronze) Japan
  - 4th: Sweden
- 26 June – 17 July — 2011 FIFA Women's World Cup in Germany
  - (gold) Japan
  - (silver) United States
  - (bronze) Sweden
  - 4th: France

== News ==
- CONCACAF representative Chuck Blazer step down from his position.
- In the United States and Canada, Major League Soccer expanded from 16 to 18 clubs by adding franchises in Portland, Oregon and Vancouver British Columbia. The clubs are the Portland Timbers and Vancouver Whitecaps FC, respectively and retain their historical names dating back to the 1970s.

== Continental champions ==
=== Champions League ===
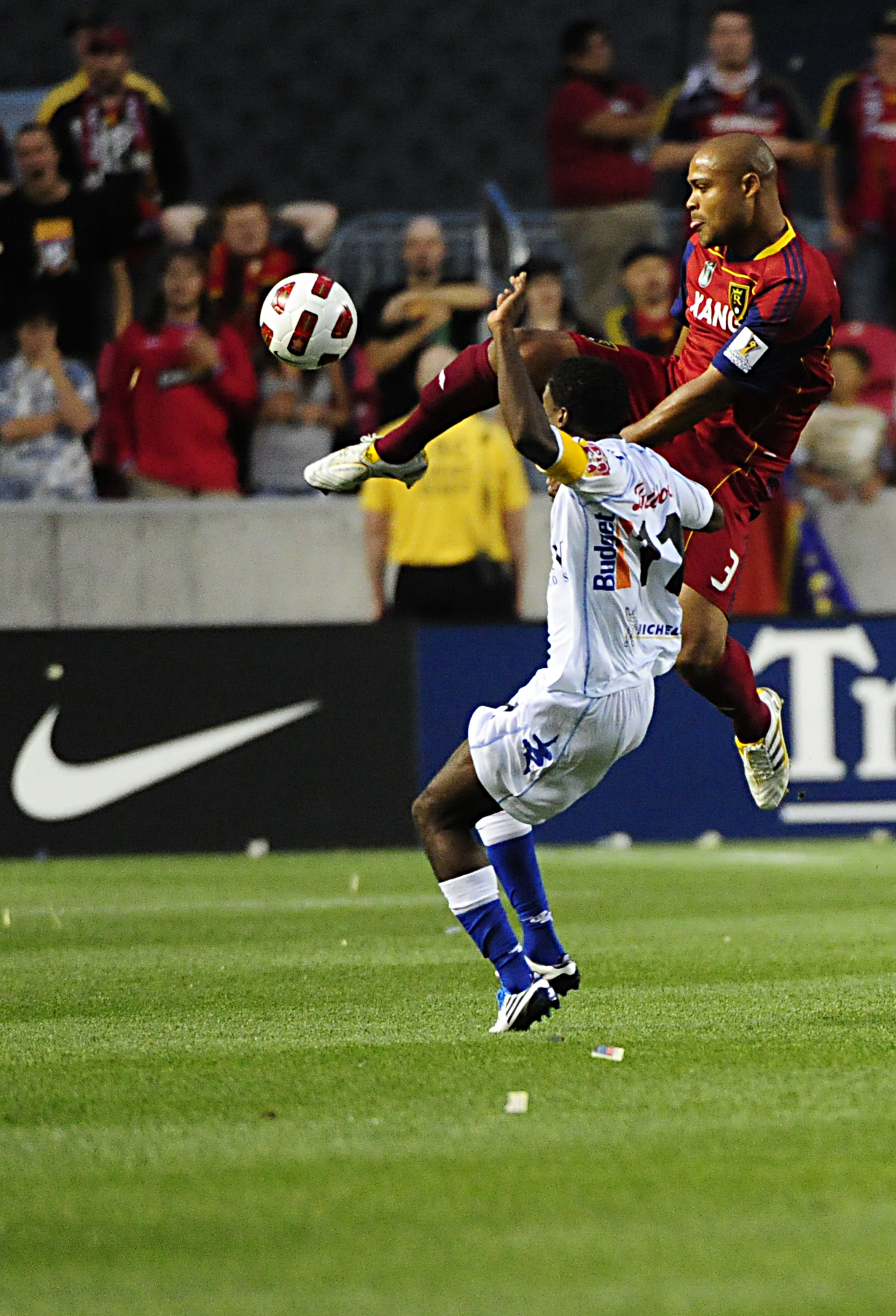
Real Salt Lake became the first MLS club to make the Champions League Finals.

In April 2011, the 2011 CONCACAF Champions League Finals was contested between Monterrey of the Mexican Primera División, and Real Salt Lake of the United States and Canada's Major League Soccer to determine the champion of the 2010–11 CONCACAF Champions League. The finals, made it the first time in the Champions League-era that the final was not an all-Mexican affair. The final also marked the first time since 2000 that an MLS club made it to the continental finals. The two-legged series ended in Monterrey's favor, defeating Salt Lake 3–2 on aggregate.

That same month, the final stage of the 2011 CFU Club Championship was contested as the Puerto Rico Islanders won their third Caribbean club title, defeating Haiti's Tempête FC in the final. With Guyana's Alpha United defeating Trinidad and Tobago's Defence Force, the 2011–12 Champions League will feature Caribbean clubs from outside of Puerto Rico and Trinidad and Tobago.

In July 2011, the 2011–12 CONCACAF Champions League began with the Preliminary round being held. The following month, the group stage of the tournament began. For the first time ever in a meaningful competition, an American soccer team defeated a Mexican soccer club on Mexican soil, as FC Dallas defeated UNAM 1–0. During the same round of group matches, Seattle Sounders FC became the second American club to defeat a Mexican team in Mexico, this time beating the defending 2010–11 champions, Monterrey by an identical 1–0 scoreline.

2010–11 bracket

Quarterfinals
(Mexico) Toluca	0	0	0
(Mexico) Monterrey	1	1	2
(Mexico) Cruz Azul	2	3	5
(Mexico) Santos Laguna	0	1	1
(United States) Columbus Crew	0	1	1
(United States) Real Salt Lake	0	4	4
(Costa Rica) Saprissa	1	2	3
(Honduras) Olimpia	0	1	1

Semifinals
(Mexico) Monterrey	2	1	3
(Mexico) Cruz Azul	1	1	2
(United States) Real Salt Lake	2	1	3
(Costa Rica) Saprissa	0	2	2

Finals
(Mexico) Monterrey	2	1	3
(United States) Real Salt Lake	2	0	2

=== SuperLiga ===
After four seasons of the North American SuperLiga, the tournament was discontinued, with MLS commissioner Don Garber commissioner stating that "SuperLiga was a great tournament which served its purpose during its time. CONCACAF got more and more committed to a continental tournament with the Champions League, which we’re very supportive of. It has delivered the value we intended in SuperLiga to put our teams against the best competition in this region".

Prior to the cancellation of the tournament, the SuperLiga had a format very similar to UEFA's Europa League in which the best clubs in the U.S. and Mexico not to qualify for the Champions League earned a berth into the tournament. The final SuperLiga championship involved Morelia of Mexico defeating New England Revolution of the United States, 2–1.

=== CFU Club championship ===
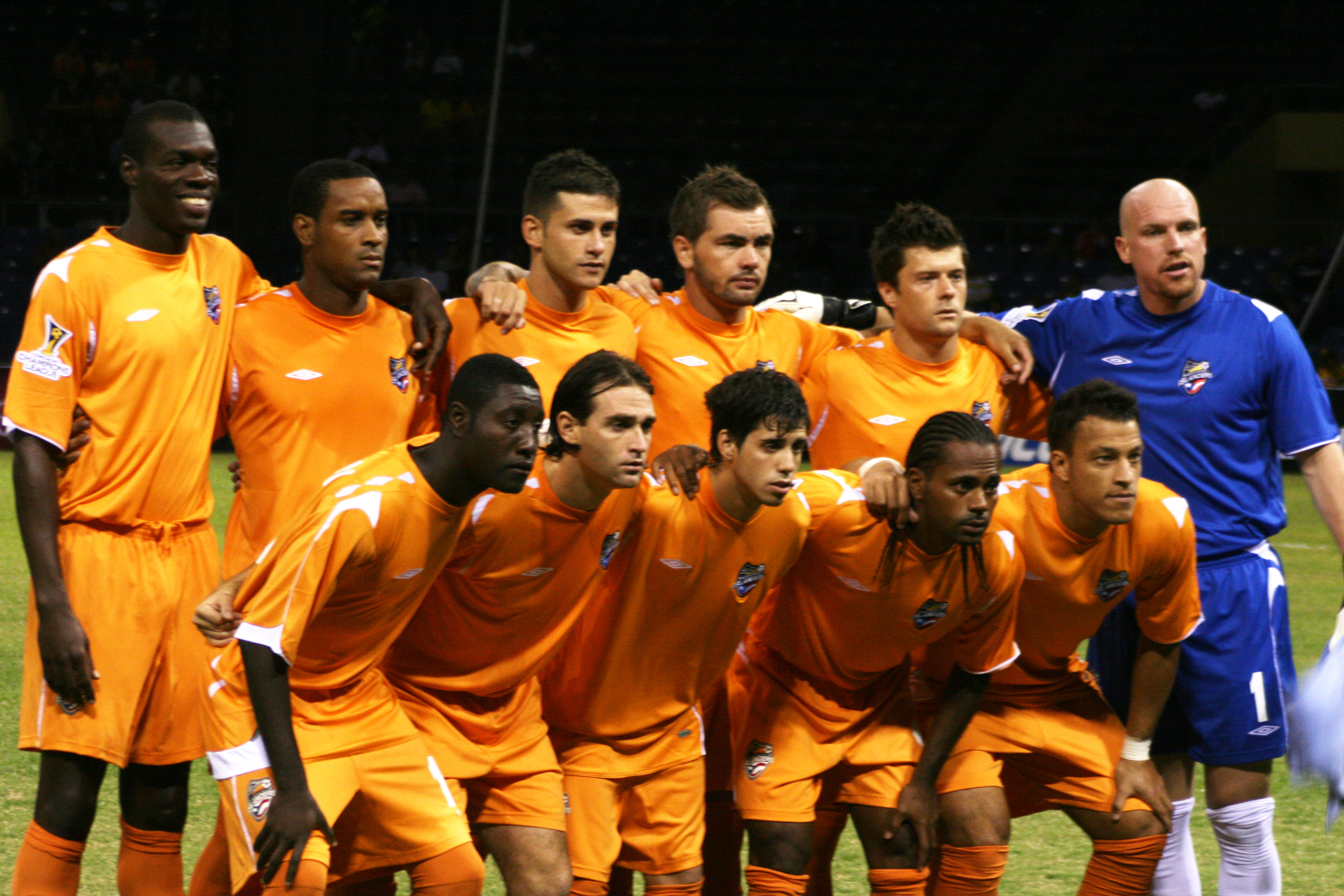
The Puerto Rico Islanders, picture above, won their second-consecutive Caribbean club championship.

Puerto Rico Islanders won the 2011 edition of the CFU Club Championship, making it both their second ever CFU Club title and their second-consecutive subcontinental championship. Played at Providence Stadium in Providence, Guyana on 27 May, the Islanders defeated Tempête of Haiti, 3–1, in extra time, to win the CFU Club Championship. Puerto Rico's Jay Needham scored for the Islanders in the 34th minute of regulation, while Tempête's Junior Charles scored in the 42nd minute. In extra time, Puerto Rico's Jonathan Faña netted in the 100th and 113th minute of play. For reaching the finals, both Puerto Rico Islanders and Tempête FC qualified into the preliminary round of the 2011–12 CONCACAF Champions League.

The third place match also determined the final entrant into the Champions League. There, Guyana's Alpha United became the first Guyanese club to qualify for the Champions League by defeating Trinidad and Tobago's Defence Force 4–3 in a penalty shoot-out.

Bracket

Semi-finals
(Haiti) Tempête (pen.)	0 (4)
(Trinidad and Tobago) Defence Force	0 (2)
(Guyana) Alpha United	1
(Puerto Rico) PR Islanders (a.e.t.)	3

Final
(Haiti) Tempête	1
(Puerto Rico) PR Islanders (a.e.t.)	3
Third place
(Trinidad and Tobago) Defence Force	1 (3)
(Guyana) Alpha United (pen.)	1 (4)

=== World Football Challenge ===
Table

Pos	Team	Pld	W	PKW	PKL	L	GF	GA	GD	BP	Pts
1	(Spain) Real Madrid (C)	3	3	0	0	0	9	2	+7	8	17
2	(England) Manchester United	3	3	0	0	0	9	3	+6	8	17
3	(England) Manchester City	3	2	1	0	0	5	2	+3	5	13
4	(Italy) Juventus	3	2	0	0	1	3	2	+1	3	9
5	(Spain) Barcelona	3	1	0	0	2	4	6	−2	4	7
6	(Mexico) Guadalajara	3	1	0	0	2	4	5	−1	3	6
7	(United States) MLS Western (Note: MLS Western Conference composed of one game by the Vancouver Whitecaps and two games by the Los Angeles Galaxy)	3	0	0	1	2	3	7	−4	3	4
8	(United States) MLS Eastern (Note: MLS Eastern Conference composed of one game each by the New England Revolution, Philadelphia Union, and Chicago Fire)	3	0	0	0	3	3	9	−6	3	3
9	(Mexico) Club América	3	0	0	0	3	0	5	−5	0	0

Source: World Football Challenge Standings
Note: Sporting CP played only one game and did not accrue points.
(C) Champion
Notes:

Results for CONCACAF clubs

All times are in the EDT time zone (UTC−4) (Local Times in parentheses).

13 July 2011	New England Revolution (United States)	1–4	(England) Manchester United	Gillette Stadium, Foxborough
20:00 (20:00 UTC−4)	Mansally 56'	Report	Owen 51'; Macheda 54', 61'; Park 80'	Attendance: 51,523; Referee: Mark Geiger

16 July 2011	América (Mexico)	0–2	(England) Manchester City	AT&T Park, San Francisco
20:00 (17:00 UTC−7)		Report	McGivern 17'; Wright-Phillips 27'	Attendance: 11,250; Referee: Hilario Grajeda

16 July 2011	Los Angeles Galaxy (United States)	1–4	(Spain) Real Madrid	Los Angeles Memorial Coliseum, Los Angeles
22:00 (19:00 UTC−7)	Cristman 67'	Report	Callejón 31'; Joselu 40'; Ronaldo 53'; Benzema 58'	Attendance: 56,211; Referee: Jorge Gonzalez

18 July 2011	Vancouver Whitecaps FC (Canada)	1–2	(England) Manchester City	Empire Field, Vancouver
22:00 (19:00 UTC−7)	Sanvezzo 30'	Report	Guidetti 68'; Wright-Phillips 84'	Attendance: 24,074; Referee: Mauricio Navarro

20 July 2011	Guadalajara (Mexico)	0–3	(Spain) Real Madrid	Qualcomm Stadium, San Diego
23:00 (20:00 UTC−7)		Report	Ronaldo 73', 76' (pen.), 82'	Attendance: 38,211; Referee: Ricardo Salazar

23 July 2011	Chicago Fire (United States)	1–3	(England) Manchester United	Soldier Field, Chicago
17:00 (16:00 UTC−5)	Gibbs 13'	Report	Rooney 66'; Rafael 75'; Nani 82'	Attendance: 61,308; Referee: Terry Vaughn

23 July 2011	Philadelphia Union (United States)	1–2	(Spain) Real Madrid	Lincoln Financial Field, Philadelphia
21:00 (21:00 UTC−4)	M. Farfan 80'	Report	Callejón 2'; Özil 11'	Attendance: 57,305; Referee: Alex Prus

24 July 2011	Los Angeles Galaxy (United States)	1–1 (6–7 p)	(England) Manchester City	The Home Depot Center, Carson
16:00 (13:00 UTC−7)	Magee 53'	Report	Balotelli 20' (pen.)	Attendance: 24,897; Referee: Ricardo Salazar
	Penalties
	Keat (penalty scored); Birchall (penalty scored); Juninho (penalty missed); Dunivant (penalty scored); Stephens (penalty scored); McBean (penalty missed); Gonzalez (penalty scored); McCarty (penalty scored); DeLaGarza (penalty missed)		(penalty scored) Milner; (penalty scored) Weiss; (penalty scored) Suárez; (penalty scored) Kolarov; (penalty missed) Guidetti; (penalty missed) Lescott; (penalty scored) De Jong; (penalty scored) Wright-Phillips; (penalty scored) Hart

26 July 2011	Juventus (Italy)	1–0	(Mexico) América	Citi Field, Flushing, Queens
19:30 (19:30 UTC−4)	Pasquato 42'	Report		Attendance: 20,859; Referee: Jorge Gonzalez

28 July 2011	Juventus (Italy)	1–0	(Mexico) Guadalajara	Carter–Finley Stadium, Raleigh
20:00 (20:00 UTC−4)	Quagliarella 12'	Report		Attendance: 16,124; Referee: Mark Kadlecik

3 August 2011	Barcelona (Spain)	1–4	(Mexico) Guadalajara	Sun Life Stadium, Miami Gardens
20:00 (20:00 UTC−4)	Villa 3'	Report	Fabián 60', 63'; Casillas 72'; Verduzco 90+3'	Attendance: 70,080; Referee: Baldomero Toledo

6 August 2011	Barcelona (Spain)	2–0	(Mexico) América	Cowboys Stadium, Arlington
16:00 (15:00 UTC−5)	Villa 24'; Keita 90'	Report		Attendance: 60,087; Referee: Ricardo Salazar

== Domestic league champions and premiers ==
=== List of champions ===
==== Men's ====
The following list contains the champion of every men's association football league in the CONCACAF region.

Nation	League	Champion	Title	Last Honor
Anguilla	2010–11 AFA League	Kicks United	2nd	2007
Antigua and Barbuda	2010–11 Antigua and Barbuda Premier Division	Parham FC	4th	2003
Aruba	2010–11 Aruban Division di Honor	Racing Club Aruba	7th	2008
(The Bahamas) Bahamas	2011 BFA Senior League	IM Bears FC	4th	2010
Barbados	2011 Barbados Premier Division	Youth Milan	2nd	2006
Belize	2010–11 Belize Premier Football League	Belize Defence Force	2nd	2010
Bermuda	2010–11 Bermudian Premier Division	North Village Community Club	8th	2006
British Virgin Islands	2011 British Virgin Islands Championship	Islanders FC	2nd	2010
Cayman Islands	2010–11 Cayman Islands League	Elite SC	2nd	2009
Costa Rica	2011 Verano^{[A]}	Alajuelense	26th	2010
Costa Rica	2011 Invierno^{[B]}	TBD	TBD	TBD
Cuba	2010–11 Campeonato Nacional de Fútbol de Cuba	Villa Clara	11th	2004
Curaçao	2010–11 Sekshon Pagá			
Dominica	2010–11 Dominica Premiere League			
Dominican Republic	2011 Primera División de Republica Dominicana			
El Salvador	2011 Clausura^{[C]}	Alianza	10th	2004
El Salvador	2011 Apertura^{[D]}	TBD	TBD	TBD
French Guiana	2010–11 French Guiana Championnat National	Matoury	3rd	2006
Grenada	2011 Grenada Premier Division	Hard Rock FC	1st	—
Guadeloupe	2010–11 Guadeloupe Division d'Honneur	Moulien	3rd	2009
Guatemala	2010–11 Liga Nacional de Fútbol de Guatemala	Comunicaciones	24th^{[E]}	2008
Guyana	2011 GFF National Super League	Alpha United	3rd	2010
Haiti	2010–11 1. Ligue Haïtienne	Aigle Noir	4th	1970
Honduras	2010–11 Honduran Liga Nacional	Olimpia	23rd	2010
Jamaica	2010–11 National Premier League	Tivoli Gardens	5th	2009
Martinique	2010–11 Martinique Championnat National	Club Colonial	19th	1972
Mexico	2011 Clausura^{[F]}	UNAM	7th	2009
Mexico	2011 Apertura^{[G]}	TBD	TBD	TBD
Montserrat	2011 Montserrat Championship	Competition not held		
Nicaragua	2011 Clausura^{[H]}	Real Estelí	10th	2010
Nicaragua	2011 Apertura^{[I]}	TBD	TBD	TBD
Panama	2011 Clausura^{[J]}	San Francisco	7th	2009
Panama	2011 Apertura^{[K]}	TBD	TBD	TBD
(Saint Kitts and Nevis) St. Kitts and Nevis	2010–11 SKNFA Premier League	St Paul's United	3rd	2009
(Saint Lucia) St. Lucia	2011 Saint Lucia Gold Division	VSADC	7th	2002
(Collectivity of Saint Martin) St. Martin	2010–11 Saint-Martin Championships	Junior Stars	11th	2003
(Saint Vincent and the Grenadines) St. Vincent and the Grenadines	2010–11 NLA Premier League	Avenues United	2nd	2010
Sint Maarten	2010–11 Sint Maarten League	No competition held		
Suriname	2010–11 Hoofdklasse	Inter Moengotapoe	3rd	2008
Trinidad and Tobago	2010–11 TT Pro League	Defence Force	21st	1999
Turks and Caicos Islands	2010–11 MFL League	Provopool FC	1st	—
United States and Canada	2011 Major League Soccer	Los Angeles Galaxy	3rd	2005
(United States Virgin Islands) U.S. Virgin Islands	2010–11 U.S. Virgin Islands Championship	Competition not held		

==== Women's ====
The following list contains the champion of every women's association football league in the CONCACAF region.

Nation	League	Champion	Title	Last Honor
Canada and United States	2011 W-League^{[M]}	Atlanta Silverbacks Women	1st	—
United States	2011 Women's Professional Soccer	Western New York Flash	1st	—

=== List of premiers ===
Some CONCACAF nations determine their league champion through a post-season tournament. This list reflects on the team that won the premiership, often known as the team with the best regular season record. In seasons which the Apertura and Clasura and used to create an aggregate/relegation table for the season, the team with the better aggregate record is listed as the premier.

Nation	League	Premier	Title	Last Honor
Aruba	2010–11 Aruban Division di Honor	Racing Club Aruba	9th	2004
Belize	2010–11 Belize Premier Football League	Belize Defence Force	2nd	2010
British Virgin Islands	2011 British Virgin Islands Championship	Islanders FC	2nd	2010
Costa Rica	2011 Verano^{[A]}	Saprissa	18th	2008
Costa Rica	2011 Invierno^{[B]}	TBD	TBD	TBD
Cuba	2010–11 Campeonato Nacional de Fútbol de Cuba	Camagüey	1st	—
El Salvador	2011 Clausura^{[C]}	Alianza	2nd	2001
El Salvador	2011 Apertura^{[D]}	TBD	TBD	TBD
Guatemala	2010–11 Liga Nacional de Fútbol de Guatemala	Municipal	8th	2009
Haiti	2010–11 1. Ligue Haïtienne	Tempête	4th	2005
Honduras	2010–11 Honduran Liga Nacional	Olimpia	20th	2008
Mexico	2011 Clausura^{[F]}	UANL	1st	—
Mexico	2011 Apertura^{[G]}	TBD	TBD	TBD
Nicaragua	2011 Clausura^{[H]}	Real Estelí	8th	2009
Nicaragua	2011 Apertura^{[I]}	TBD	TBD	TBD
Panama	2011 Clausura^{[J]}	Atlético Chiriquí	1st	—
Panama	2011 Apertura^{[K]}	TBD	TBD	TBD
(Saint Kitts and Nevis) St. Kitts and Nevis	2010–11 SKNFA Premier League	St Paul's United	3rd	2009
Suriname	2010–11 Hoofdklasse	WBC	1st	—
United States and Canada	2011 Major League Soccer	Los Angeles Galaxy	4th	2010
(United States Virgin Islands) U.S. Virgin Islands	2010–11 U.S. Virgin Islands Championship	Unique FC^{[L]}	1st	—

== Domestic cup champions ==
Several CONCACAF nations, most notably nations that do not use the Apertura/Clasura system host a domestic knockout cup that parallels the league seasons. These cups are open to all divisions of each nation's respective pyramid.

=== Men's ===
Nation	Competition	Champion	Title	Last Honor
Aruba	2011 Torneo Copa Betico Croes			
(The Bahamas) Belize	2010–11 Bahamas President's Cup	Cavalier FC	3rd	2010
Canada	2011 Canadian Championship	Toronto FC	3rd	2010
Suriname	2011 Surinamese Cup	Inter Moengotapoe	1st	—
United States	2011 U.S. Open Cup	Seattle Sounders FC	3rd	2010

=== Women's ===
Nation	Competition	Champion	Title	Last Honor
United States	2011 U.S. National Women's Cup	St. Louis JB Marine	1st	—

== Footnotes ==
A. The 2011 Costa Rican Verano is part of the 2010–11 Costa Rican Primera División season.
B. The 2011 Costa Rican Invierno is part of the 2011–12 Costa Rican Primera División season.
C. The 2011 Salvadoran Clausura is part of the 2010–11 Salvadoran Primera División.
D. The 2011 Salvadoran Apertura is part of the 2011–12 Salvadoran Primera División.
E. Guatemala's Comunicaciones won both the 2011 Apertura and Clausura titles.
F.
G.
H.
I.
J.
K.
L. The U.S. Virgin Islands Championship hosted respective regular seasons for each island's soccer league, but a tournament to determine the champion was not held.
M. The W-League, though the second division women's soccer league in the United States is the top division of women's soccer in Canada.
N. In the 2011 World Football Challenge, Canadian MLS club Vancouver Whitecaps FC and American MLS clubs Los Angeles Galaxy and Seattle Sounders FC represented the MLS Western team.
O. In the 2011 World Football Challenge, American MLS clubs Chicago Fire, New England Revolution, Philadelphia Union represented the MLS Eastern Team.
