= Opsenica =

Opsenica is a Serbian surname. Notable people with the surname include:

- Miroslav Opsenica (1981–2011), Serbian footballer
- Stanko Opsenica (1907–1943), Yugoslav partisan
