= Aruwa =

Aruwa is both a given name and a surname. Notable people with the name include:

- Aruwa Ameh (1990–2011), Nigerian footballer
- Mohammed Aruwa (1948–2018), Nigerian senator
