= Roy Greenwood =

Roy Greenwood is the name of:

- Roy Greenwood (footballer, born 1931), English professional footballer for Crystal Palace
- Roy Greenwood (footballer, born 1952), English professional footballer for Hull City, Sunderland, Derby County, Swindon Town, Huddersfield Town and Tranmere Rovers
