= 2011 Guam Men's Soccer League =

Guam Men's Soccer League
- Season: 2010–11
- Champions: Cars Plus FC

2011 Guam Men's Soccer League, officially named Budweiser Guam Men's Soccer League due to sponsorship reason, is the association football league of Guam.

== Standings ==
Pos	Team	Pld	W	D	L	GF	GA	GD	Pts
1	Cars Plus FC (C)	10	10	0	0	55	6	+49	30
2	Quality Distributors FC	10	6	1	3	40	20	+20	19
3	Fuji-Ichiban Espada FC	10	6	1	3	36	17	+19	19
4	Guam Shipyard	10	2	1	7	15	38	−23	7
5	Benjamin Moore Strykers	10	2	1	7	22	45	−23	7
6	Carpet Masters	10	2	0	8	17	59	−42	6

Source: rsssf.com
(C) Champions
