= 2011–12 Guam Men's Soccer League =

Guam Men's Soccer League
- Season: 2011–12
- Champions: Quality Distributors

2011–12 Guam Men's Soccer League, officially named Budweiser Guam Men's Soccer League due to sponsorship reason, is the association football league of Guam.

== Standings ==
Pos	Team	Pld	W	D	L	GF	GA	GD	Pts
1	Quality Distributors (C)	20	13	4	3	84	25	+59	43
2	Guam Shipyard	20	13	2	5	91	25	+66	41
3	Fuji-Ichiban Espada FC	20	12	1	7	72	54	+18	37
4	Cars Plus FC	20	9	4	7	70	50	+20	31
5	Guahan ICRC	20	6	0	14	34	128	−94	18
6	Paintco Strykers	20	1	1	18	31	100	−69	4

Source: rsssf.com
(C) Champions
