= Guam FA Cup =

- Founded: 2008
- Region: Guam
- Teams: 32 (2016)
- Current champions: Bank of Guam Strykers (2nd title) (2019)
- Most championships: Guam Shipyard; Quality Distributors (4 titles each)

The Guam Football Association Cup, better known as the Guam FA Cup, or officially the Beck's GFA Cup due to sponsorship reasons, is the national football domestic cup competition of Guam.

The competition has been administered by the Guam Football Association since its formation in 2008.

== Cup History ==
=== 2019 GFA Cup ===
Champions: Bank of Guam Strykers FC

2nd Place: Rovers FC

Final score: 5–1

=== 2018 GFA Cup ===
Champions: Bank of Guam Strykers FC

2nd Place: Rovers FC

Final score: 5–1

=== 2017 GFA Cup ===
Champions: Guam Shipyard

2nd Place: Rovers FC

Final score: 4–1

=== 2016 GFA Cup ===
Champions: Rovers FC

2nd Place: Guam Shipyard

Final score: 2–1

=== 2015 GFA Cup ===
Champions: Guam Shipyard

2nd Place: Bank of Guam Strykers FC

Final score: 1–1 (aet, 5–3 pen)

=== 2014 GFA Cup ===
Champions: Rovers FC

2nd Place: Espada

Final score: 4–3

=== 2013 GFA Cup ===
Champions: Quality Distributors

2nd Place: Espada

3rd Place: Southern Cobras

Final score: 2–1

=== 2012 GFA Cup ===
Champions: Guam Shipyard

2nd Place: Quality Distributors

3rd Place: Cars Plus FC

Final score: 4–3 [aet]

=== 2011 Beck's GFA Cup ===
Champions: Quality Distributors

2nd Place: Cars Plus FC

3rd Place: MDA Cobras

Final score: 2–1 (QDFC – Scott Spindel 2; CPFC – own goal)

=== 2010 Cars Plus GFA Cup ===
Champions: Guam Shipyard

2nd Place: Quality Distributors

3rd Place: Paintco Strykers

Final score: 4–3 (GSY – Jason Cunliffe 3, Elias Merfalen; QDFC – Scott Spindel 2, Jude Bischoff)

=== 2009 Cars Plus GFA Cup ===
Champions: Quality Distributors

2nd Place: Guam Shipyard

3rd Place: No Ka Oi Guam SC

Final score: 3–1 AET (QDFC – Jude Bischoff, Seung Min Lee, Paul Long; GSY – own goal)

=== 2008 Shirley's GFA Cup ===
Champions: Quality Distributors

2nd Place: IT&E Crushers

3rd Place: Paintco Strykers

Final score: 5–2 (QDFC: Francisco Santos 2, Jason Cunliffe, Jude Bischoff, Seung Min Lee; IT&E Eliseo Zamarron 2)

== Sponsorship ==
Since its formation, the competition has been given a title sponsor. In its first season it was sponsored by Shirley's Restaurant, for the next two seasons by Cars Plus Guam and since 2010 by Beck's Brewery.

== Performance by club ==
Year	Won	Lost	Years won
Quality Distributors	4	2	2008, 2009, 2011, 2013
Guam Shipyard	4	2	2010, 2012, 2015, 2017
Rovers FC	2	3	2014, 2016
Bank of Guam Strykers FC	2	1	2018, 2019
Espada	0	2	—
IT&E Crushers	0	1	—
Cars Plus FC	0	1	—
