= Bennie Hofs =

Dutch footballer

Bennie Hof
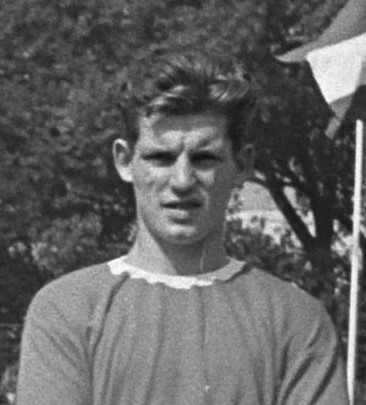
- Hofs in 1968

Personal information
- Date of birth: 2 November 1946
- Place of birth: Arnhem, Netherlands
- Date of death: 4 June 2017 (aged 70)
- Place of death: Arnhem, Netherlands
- Position: Midfielder

Youth career
- Arnhemse Boys
- 1962–1964: Vitesse

Senior career*
Years	Team	Apps	(Gls)
1964–1979	Vitesse	390	(61)
- * Club domestic league appearances and goals

Bennie Hofs, also known as Ben Hofs (2 November 1946 – 4 June 2017) was a Dutch professional footballer who spent his entire career with Vitesse. He played as a midfielder.

Born and raised in the Klarendal neighborhood, Hofs started playing for Arnhemse Boys before joining Vitesse and making his senior debut in 1964. He was honoured Zilveren Vitessenaar for his services to the club.

== Personal life ==
After retiring as a player, Hofs and his wife ran a snack bar in Klarendal for 30 years.

His nephew Nicky Hofs also played for Vitesse, as did his brother Henk.
