= List of Mexican Football Transfers Winter 2011 =

This is a list of Mexican football transfers in the Mexican Primera Division during the winter 2011 transfer window, grouped by club. The 2011 winter transfer window for Mexican football opened on December 1 and closed at 23:00 on December 21, 2011 for the national market and on December 31, 2011 for the international one. Football has been played professionally in Mexico since the early 1900s. Since 1996, the country has played two split seasons instead of a traditional long season. There are two separate playoff and league divisions. After many years of calling the regular seasons as "Verano" (Summer) and "Invierno" (Winter); the Primera División de México (Mexican First League Division) have changed the names of the competition, and has opted for "Apertura" (opening) and "Clausura" (closing) events. The Apertura division begins in the middle of Mexico's summer and ends before the official start of winter. The Clausura division begins during the New Year, and concludes in the spring season.

== América ==
=== In ===
#	Position	Player	Age	From	Date	Type	Source
	GK	(Mexico) Moisés Muñoz	31	(Mexico) Atlante	November 18, 2011	Exchange	
	MF	(Mexico) Christian Bermúdez	24	(Mexico) Atlante	November 26, 2011	Exchange	
	MF	(Mexico) José María Cárdenas	26	(Mexico) Santos Laguna	December 16, 2011	Transfer	
	DF	(Venezuela) Oswaldo Vizcarrondo	27	(Argentina) Olimpo	December 19, 2011	Transfer	
	MF	(Mexico) Gil Cordero	19	(Mexico) Veracruz	December 22, 2011	Loan	

=== Out ===
#	Position	Player	Age	To	Date	Type	Source
1	GK	(Mexico) Armando Navarrete	31	(Mexico) Atlante	November 26, 2011	Exchange	
15	DF	(United States) Edgar Castillo	25	(Mexico) Tijuana	November 27, 2011	Sold	
23	MF	(Mexico) José Joaquín Martínez	24	(Mexico) Necaxa	December 17, 2011	Loan	
18	MF	(Mexico) Ángel Reyna	27	(Mexico) Monterrey	December 21, 2011	Sacked	
34	DF	(Mexico) George Corral	21	(Mexico) Chiapas	December 21, 2011	Loan	
16	FW	(United States) Isaac Acuña	22	(Mexico) Mérida	December 22, 2011	Loan	
20	GK	(Mexico) Leonín Pineda	26	(Mexico) La Piedad	December 22, 2011	Loan	

== Atlante ==
=== In ===
#	Position	Player	Age	From	Date	Type	Source
	GK	(Mexico) Armando Navarrete	31	(Mexico) América	November 26, 2011	Exchange	.
	MF	(Ecuador) Michael Arroyo	24	(Mexico) San Luis	November 27, 2011	Exchange	
	DF	(Ecuador) Jorge Guagua	30	(Ecuador) LDU Quito	December 1, 2011	Transfer	
	DF	(Mexico) Ricardo Jiménez	27	(Mexico) Atlas	December 3, 2011	Loan	
	FW	(Mexico) Hebert Alférez	23	(Croatia) HNK Rijeka	December 13, 2011	Loan	
	FW	(Peru) Andrés Mendoza	33	(United States) Columbus Crew	December 13, 2011	Transfer	

=== Out ===
#	Position	Player	Age	To	Date	Type	Source
23	GK	(Mexico) Moisés Muñoz	31	(Mexico) América	November 18, 2011	Exchange	
19	DF	(Mexico) Diego Ordaz	27	(Mexico) San Luis	November 25, 2011	Exchange	
10	MF	(Mexico) Christian Bermúdez	24	(Mexico) América	November 26, 2011	Exchange	
9	FW	(Venezuela) Giancarlo Maldonado	29	(Mexico) Atlas	December 3, 2011	Sold	
33	MF	(Argentina) Matías Córdoba	27	(Chile) Antofagasta	December 10, 2011	Sold	
5	DF	(Argentina) Nicolás Torres	28	TBD	December 10, 2011		

== Atlas ==
=== In ===
#	Position	Player	Age	From	Date	Type	Source
	FW	(Venezuela) Giancarlo Maldonado	29	(Mexico) Atlante	December 3, 2011	Transfer	
	GK	(Mexico) Jorge Villalpando	26	(Mexico) Toluca	December 3, 2011	Loan	
	DF	(Mexico) Rogelio Chávez	27	(Mexico) Pachuca	December 6, 2011	Exchange	
	DF	(Argentina) Leandro Cufré	33	(Croatia) Dinamo Zagreb	December 7, 2011	Transfer	
	DF	(Argentina) Facundo Erpen	28	(Argentina) Instituto	December 17, 2011	Transfer	
	MF	(Argentina) Jorge Zamogilny	31	(Mexico) Estudiantes Tecos	December 20, 2011	Transfer	
	FW	(Mexico) Sergio Santana	32	(Mexico) Monterrey	December 22, 2011	Transfer	

=== Out ===
#	Position	Player	Age	To	Date	Type	Source
11	FW	(Uruguay) Gastón Puerari	25	TBD	September 29, 2011	Sacked	
5	DF	(Uruguay) Jonathan Lacerda	24	(Mexico) Puebla	December 3, 2011	Sold	
24	GK	(Mexico) José Francisco Canales	24	TBD	December 3, 2011		
17	FW	(Honduras) Georgie Welcome	26	TBD	December 3, 2011		
2	DF	(Mexico) Ricardo Jiménez	27	(Mexico) Atlante	December 3, 2011	Loan	
3	DF	(Mexico) Néstor Vidrio	22	(Mexico) Pachuca	December 7, 2011	Exchange	
15	DF	(Mexico) Alfredo González Tahuilán	31	(Mexico) Tijuana	December 21, 2011	Sold	
4	DF	(Mexico) Luis Enrique Robles	25	(Mexico) Veracruz	December 22, 2011	Sold	
31	MF	(Mexico) Jonathan Piña	22	(Mexico) La Piedad	December 22, 2011	Loan	

== Cruz Azul ==
=== In ===
#	Position	Player	Age	From	Date	Type	Source
	FW	(Mexico) Omar Bravo	31	(United States) Sporting KC	December 12, 2011	Transfer	

=== Out ===
#	Position	Player	Age	To	Date	Type	Source
18	MF	(Mexico) César Villaluz	23	(Mexico) San Luis	December 9, 2011	Sold	
5	DF	(Mexico) Alejandro Castro	24	(Mexico) Estudiantes Tecos	December 9, 2011	Loan	
13	MF	(Mexico) Allam Bello	23	(Mexico) Neza	December 15, 2011	Loan	

== Estudiantes Tecos ==
=== In ===
#	Position	Player	Age	From	Date	Type	Source
	DF	(Mexico) José Antonio Castro	31	(Mexico) Necaxa	December 5, 2011	Transfer	
	DF	(Mexico) Alejandro Castro	24	(Mexico) Cruz Azul	December 9, 2011	Loan	
	MF	(Mexico) Edgar Solís	24	(Mexico) Guadalajara	December 14, 2011	Loan	
	FW	(Paraguay) Fredy Bareiro	29	(Paraguay) Cerro Porteño	December 16, 2011	Return from Loan	
	MF	(Argentina) Gabriel Pereyra	33	(Mexico) Puebla	December 21, 2011	Loan	
	FW	(Mexico) Michel Vázquez	21	(Mexico) Querétaro	December 21, 2011	Loan	
	MF	(Mexico) Gerardo Galindo	33	Free agent	December 23, 2011	Loan	

=== Out ===
#	Position	Player	Age	To	Date	Type	Source
6	DF	(Mexico) Rafael Medina	32	(Mexico) Veracruz	December 7, 2011	Sold	
16	FW	(United States) Herculez Gomez	29	(Mexico) Santos Laguna	December 12, 2011	Sold	
18	MF	(Argentina) Jorge Zamogilny	31	(Mexico) Atlas	December 20, 2011	Sold	
13	DF	(Mexico) Melvin Brown	32	(Mexico) Cruz Azul Hidalgo	December 22, 2011	Loan	
25	MF	(Mexico) José Ramón Partida	22	(Mexico) Sinaloa	December 22, 2011	Loan	

== Guadalajara ==
=== In ===
#	Position	Player	Age	From	Date	Type	Source
	DF	(Mexico) Dionicio Escalante	21	(Mexico) Pachuca	December 8, 2011	Return from Loan	

=== Out ===
#	Position	Player	Age	To	Date	Type	Source
98	MF	(Mexico) José Tostado	17	(Mexico) Tigres UANL	September 22, 2011	Sacked	
3	DF	(Mexico) Arturo Ledesma	23	(Mexico) Pachuca	December 8, 2011	Loan	
30	MF	(Mexico) Edgar Solís	24	(Mexico) Estudiantes Tecos	December 14, 2011	Loan	

== Jaguares ==
=== In ===
#	Position	Player	Age	From	Date	Type	Source
	MF	(Mexico) Luis Miguel Noriega	26	(Mexico) Morelia	December 12, 2011	Exchange	
	DF	(Mexico) Yasser Corona	24	(Mexico) Morelia	December 12, 2011	Loan	
	MF	(Mexico) Hibert Ruíz	24	(Mexico) Querétaro	December 20, 2011	Transfer	
	DF	(Mexico) George Corral	21	(Mexico) América	December 22, 2011	Loan	

=== Out ===
#	Position	Player	Age	To	Date	Type	Source
26	MF	(Mexico) Christian Valdéz	27	(Mexico) Morelia	December 12, 2011	Exchange	
7	DF	(Mexico) Óscar Razo	27	(Mexico) Morelia	December 12, 2011	Exchange	
3	DF	(Mexico) Jesús Chávez	25	(Mexico) San Luis	December 22, 2011	Sold	
8	DF	(Mexico) Orlando Rincón	26	(Mexico) Mérida	December 22, 2011	Sold	

== Monterrey ==
=== In ===
#	Position	Player	Age	From	Date	Type	Source
7	FW	(Mexico) Othoniel Arce	22	(Mexico) San Luis	November 25, 2011	Exchange	
10	MF	(Mexico) Ángel Reyna	27	(Mexico) América	December 21, 2011	Transfer	

=== Out ===
#	Position	Player	Age	To	Date	Type	Source
22	DF	(Mexico) William Paredes	26	(Mexico) San Luis	November 25, 2011	Exchange	
33	MF	(Mexico) Marvin Piñón	20	(Mexico) Correcaminos	December 17, 2011	Loan	
11	FW	(Mexico) Sergio Santana	32	(Mexico) Atlas	December 22, 2011	Transfer	
16	MF	(Mexico) Luis Alfonso Rodríguez	20	(Mexico) San Luis	December 22, 2011	Loan	

== Morelia ==
=== In ===
#	Position	Player	Age	From	Date	Type	Source
	MF	(Mexico) Christian Valdéz	27	(Mexico) Chiapas	December 12, 2011	Exchange	
	DF	(Mexico) Óscar Razo	27	(Mexico) Chiapas	December 12, 2011	Exchange	
	MF	(Mexico) Diego Mejía	28	(Mexico) Neza	December 14, 2011	Transfer	
	FW	(Mexico) Víctor Guajardo	21	(Mexico) Neza	December 14, 2011	Youth System	
	FW	(Colombia) Edison Toloza	27	(Colombia) Millonarios	December 22, 2011	Loan	

=== Out ===
#	Position	Player	Age	To	Date	Type	Source
19	MF	(Mexico) Manuel Pérez	31	(Mexico) Veracruz	November 10, 2011	Sacked	
22	DF	(Mexico) Diego Jiménez	25	TBD	November 10, 2011	Sacked	
14	MF	(Mexico) Luis Miguel Noriega	26	(Mexico) Chiapas	December 12, 2011	Exchange	
17	DF	(Mexico) Yasser Corona	24	(Mexico) Chiapas	December 12, 2011	Loan	

== Pachuca ==
=== In ===
#	Position	Player	Age	From	Date	Type	Source
	DF	(Mexico) Néstor Vidrio	22	(Mexico) Atlas	December 7, 2011	Exchange	
	DF	(Mexico) Arturo Ledesma	23	(Mexico) Guadalajara	December 8, 2011	Loan	

=== Out ===
#	Position	Player	Age	To	Date	Type	Source
1	GK	(Colombia) Miguel Calero	40	Unattached	October 22, 2011	Retirement	
28	DF	(Mexico) Rogelio Chávez	27	(Mexico) Atlas	December 6, 2011	Exchange	
3	DF	(Mexico) Dionicio Escalante	21	(Mexico) Guadalajara	December 8, 2011	End of Loan	
110	MF	(Colombia) Andrés Chitiva	32	Unattached	December 14, 2011	Retirement	
7	MF	(Mexico) Elías Hernández	23	(Mexico) Tigres UANL	December 21, 2011	Sold	
24	MF	(Mexico) Raúl Martínez	24	(Mexico) León	December 22, 2011	Loan	
4	DF	(Mexico) Marco Iván Pérez	24	(Mexico) León	December 22, 2011	Loan	
15	MF	(Mexico) Juan Carlos Silva	23	(Mexico) La Piedad	December 22, 2011	Loan	

== Puebla ==
=== In ===
#	Position	Player	Age	From	Date	Type	Source
	FW	(Mexico) Luis Ángel Landín	26	Free agent	December 14, 2011	Free Transfer	.
	DF	(Uruguay) Jonathan Lacerda	24	(Mexico) Atlas	December 21, 2011	Transfer	
	FW	(United States) Eddie Johnson	27	(England) Preston North End	December 23, 2011	Transfer	
	FW	(Mexico) Kevin Zapata	21	(Mexico) Mérida	December 23, 2011	Loan	.
	MF	(Mexico) Juan Pablo García	30	(Mexico) Veracruz	December 23, 2011	Transfer	.

=== Out ===
#	Position	Player	Age	To	Date	Type	Source
20	FW	(Colombia) Duvier Riascos	25	(Mexico) Tijuana	December 17, 2011	Sold	
10	MF	(Argentina) Gabriel Pereyra	33	(Mexico) Estudiantes Tecos	December 21, 2011	Loan	
13	FW	(Mexico) Isaac Romo	28	(Mexico) Querétaro	December 21, 2011	End of Loan	
15	FW	(Mexico) Uriel Álvarez	21	(Mexico) Veracruz	December 21, 2011	End of Loan	

== Querétaro ==
=== In ===
#	Position	Player	Age	From	Date	Type	Source
	FW	(Mexico) Isaac Romo	28	(Mexico) Puebla	December 21, 2011	Return from Loan	
	MF	(Chile) José Eduardo Pérez	26	(Chile) Huachipato	December 22, 2011	Loan	
	MF	(Argentina) Pablo Vitti	26	(Peru) Universitario	December 27, 2011	Transfer	

=== Out ===
#	Position	Player	Age	To	Date	Type	Source
17	MF	(Mexico) Hibert Ruíz	24	(Mexico) Chiapas	December 20, 2011	Sold	
9	FW	(Mexico) Michel Vázquez	21	(Mexico) Estudiantes Tecos	December 21, 2011	Loan	
18	FW	(Mexico) Pablo Bonells	26	(Mexico) Celaya	December 22, 2011	Sold	
2	DF	(Colombia) Efraín Cortés	27	(Mexico) Veracruz	December 22, 2011	Sold	
13	DF	(Mexico) Alvin Mendoza	27	(Mexico) Altamira	December 22, 2011	Sold	
7	MF	(Mexico) Adolfo Bautista	32	TBD	December 22, 2011		
20	FW	(Uruguay) Carlos Bueno	31	TBD	December 22, 2011		

== San Luis ==
=== In ===
#	Position	Player	Age	From	Date	Type	Source
	DF	(Mexico) William Paredes	26	(Mexico) Monterrey	November 25, 2011	Exchange	
	DF	(Mexico) Diego Ordaz	27	(Mexico) Atlante	November 25, 2011	Exchange	
	MF	(Mexico) César Villaluz	23	(Mexico) Cruz Azul	December 9, 2011	Transfer	
	DF	(Mexico) Jesús Chávez	25	(Mexico) Chiapas	December 22, 2011	Transfer	
	MF	(Mexico) Luis Alfonso Rodríguez	20	(Mexico) Monterrey	December 22, 2011	Loan	

=== Out ===
#	Position	Player	Age	To	Date	Type	Source
27	FW	(Mexico) Othoniel Arce	22	(Mexico) Monterrey	November 25, 2011	Exchange	
9	MF	(Ecuador) Michael Arroyo	24	(Mexico) Atlante	November 27, 2011	Exchange	
6	MF	(Mexico) Jaime Correa	32	(Mexico) Necaxa	December 23, 2011	Sold	

== Santos Laguna ==
=== In ===
#	Position	Player	Age	From	Date	Type	Source
	FW	(United States) Herculez Gomez	29	(Mexico) Estudiantes Tecos	December 12, 2011	Transfer	

=== Out ===
#	Position	Player	Age	To	Date	Type	Source
7	MF	(Mexico) José María Cárdenas	26	(Mexico) América	December 16, 2011	Sold	

== Tijuana ==
=== In ===
#	Position	Player	Age	From	Date	Type	Source
	DF	(United States) Edgar Castillo	25	(Mexico) América	November 27, 2011	Transfer	
	FW	(Colombia) Duvier Riascos	25	(Mexico) Puebla	December 17, 2011	Transfer	
	DF	(United States) Greg Garza	20	(Portugal) Estoril Praia	December 18, 2011	Transfer	
	DF	(Mexico) Alfredo González Tahuilán	31	(Mexico) Atlas	December 21, 2011	Transfer	

=== Out ===
#	Position	Player	Age	To	Date	Type	Source
28	MF	(Mexico) Fernando Santana	25	TBD	November 8, 2011		
26	MF	(Mexico) Félix Ayala	30	TBD	November 8, 2011		
11	FW	(Mexico) Luis Orozco	27	(Mexico) La Piedad	November 9, 2011	Sold	
24	MF	(Argentina) Javier Yacuzzi	32	TBD	December 15, 2011		

== Toluca ==
=== In ===
#	Position	Player	Age	From	Date	Type	Source
29	MF	(Uruguay) Gonzalo Porras	27	River Plate (Uruguay)	December 22, 2011	Transfer	

=== Out ===
#	Position	Player	Age	To	Date	Type	Source
3	GK	(Mexico) Jorge Villalpando	26	(Mexico) Atlas	December 3, 2011	Loan	

== UANL ==
=== In ===
#	Position	Player	Age	From	Date	Type	Source
	RM	(Mexico) José Tostado	17	(Mexico) Guadalajara	September 22, 2011	Transfer	
	MF	(Mexico) Elías Hernández	23	(Mexico) Pachuca	December 21, 2011	Transfer	

=== Out ===
#	Position	Player	Age	To	Date	Type	Source
10	MF	(Brazil) Danilinho	24	(Brazil) Atlético Mineiro	December 21, 2011	Loan	

== UNAM ==
=== In ===
#	Position	Player	Age	From	Date	Type	Source

=== Out ===
#	Position	Player	Age	To	Date	Type	Source
17	MF	(Mexico) Juan Francisco Palencia	38	Unattached	November 28, 2011	Retirement	
