= František Havránek =

Czech footballer and manager

Personal information
- Date of birth: 11 July 1923
- Place of birth: Bratislava, Czechoslovakia
- Date of death: 26 March 2011 (aged 87)
- Place of death: Czech Republic
- Position: Midfielder

Senior career*
Years	Team	Apps	(Gls)
1939–1945	AFK Sadská		
- Aston Villa Mladá Boleslav
- Jiskra Liberec
- Jiskra Jablonec nad Nisou
- Jiskra Mimoň

Managerial career
- 1964–1966: Spartak Hradec Králové
- 1966–1968: Slavia Prague
- 1970–1972: EPA Larnaca
- 1972–1976: FC Zbrojovka Brno
- 1976–1978: Ruch Chorzów
- 1982–1984: Czechoslovakia
- 1984–1986: AEL Limassol
- * Club domestic league appearances and goals

František Havránek (11 July 1923 – 26 March 2011) was a Czech football manager and former player. He had a daughter, Dagmar Havránková (Karakolevová).

As a player, Havránek played for several lower-division Czechoslovak clubs, but never gained any success with them. He was far more successful as a football coach. After finishing his active career, Havránek started to work as a football manager. He coached Spartak Hradec Králové, Slavia Prague and FC Zbrojovka Brno in Czechoslovakia. Havránek also managed Cypriot EPA Larnaca, AEL Limassol and Polish Ruch Chorzów. In 1970, he won the Cypriot First Division with EPA Larnaca. In 1985, he won the Cypriot Cup with AEL Limassol. Two years later he returned to Czechoslovakia and ended his coaching career.

As a coach of the Czechoslovak Olympic team at the 1980 Summer Olympics, he won the gold medal with his team. From 1978 to 1984 he was a general manager of the Czechoslovakia national football team, coaching the team from 1982 to 1984.
