= Billy Gallier =

English footballer (1932–2011)

Personal information
- Full name: William Henry Gallier
- Date of birth: 24 April 1932
- Place of birth: Cannock, England
- Date of death: 6 February 2011 (aged 78)
- Place of death: Tamworth, England
- Position: Utility player

Youth career
- West Bromwich Albion

Senior career*
Years	Team	Apps	(Gls)
1955–1956	Walsall	10	(0)
1956–1960	Tamworth	109	(18)
1960–196?	Hednesford Town	?	(?)
Total		119	(18)

Managerial career
- Armitage
- * Club domestic league appearances and goals

William Gallier (24 April 1932 – 6 February 2011) was an English footballer and manager, who played for Walsall, Tamworth and Hednesford Town during his career, before going on to manage Armitage.
