= Miroslav Opsenica =

Serbian footballer

Personal information
- Date of birth: 2 November 1981
- Place of birth: Gospić, SFR Yugoslavia
- Date of death: 25 May 2011 (aged 29)
- Place of death: Šopić, Serbia
- Height: 1.76 m (5 ft 9 in)
- Position: Left wing

Senior career*
Years	Team	Apps	(Gls)
2001–2006	Mladost Apatin	134	(16)
2006	Vojvodina	10	(0)
2007–2009	ŁKS Łódź	20	(1)
2009–2010	Radnički Sombor	15	(6)
2010	→ Novi Sad (loan)	13	(0)
2010–2011	Kolubara	15	(0)
- * Club domestic league appearances and goals

Miroslav Opsenica (Serbian Cyrillic: Мирослав Опсеница; 2 November 1981 – 25 May 2011) was a Serbian footballer.

Opsenica was born in Gospić. He played for the Serbian clubs FK Mladost Apatin, FK Vojvodina, FK Radnički Sombor and FK Novi Sad, and the Polish club ŁKS Łódź.

A player of Kolubara at the time, he died in a car accident in Šopić on 25 May 2011, aged 29. He was underway to Kruševac, where he was supposed to play against Napredak.
