= 2002 J.League Cup final =

Kashima Antlers	Urawa Reds
1	0
- Date: November 4, 2002
- Venue: National Stadium, Tokyo

2002 J.League Cup final was the 10th final of the J.League Cup competition. The final was played at National Stadium in Tokyo on November 4, 2002. Kashima Antlers won the championship.

== Match details ==
November 4, 2002

Kashima Antlers	1–0	Urawa Reds
Mitsuo Ogasawara 59'	Report

National Stadium

Kashima Antlers
GK	21	(Japan) Hitoshi Sogahata
DF	2	(Japan) Akira Narahashi
DF	3	(Japan) Yutaka Akita
DF	4	(Brazil) Fabiano
DF	16	(Brazil) Augusto
MF	6	(Japan) Yasuto Honda
MF	5	(Japan) Koji Nakata
MF	8	(Japan) Mitsuo Ogasawara
MF	10	(Japan) Masashi Motoyama	(substituted off) 87'
FW	13	(Japan) Atsushi Yanagisawa
FW	31	(Brazil) Euller	(substituted off) 89'
Substitutes:
GK	29	(Japan) Riki Takasaki
DF	17	(Japan) Jun Uchida	(substituted on) 87'
DF	20	(Japan) Tomohiko Ikeuchi
MF	24	(Japan) Takeshi Aoki
FW	11	(Japan) Yoshiyuki Hasegawa	(substituted on) 89'
Manager:
(Brazil) Toninho Cerezo

Urawa Reds
GK	21	(Japan) Norihiro Yamagishi
DF	3	(Japan) Masami Ihara	(substituted off) 78'
DF	20	(Japan) Keisuke Tsuboi
DF	19	(Japan) Hideki Uchidate
MF	2	(Japan) Nobuhisa Yamada
MF	13	(Japan) Keita Suzuki
MF	28	(Japan) Tadaaki Hirakawa
MF	9	(Japan) Masahiro Fukuda
FW	7	(Japan) Yuichiro Nagai	(substituted off) 69'
FW	11	(Brazil) Tuto
FW	10	(Brazil) Emerson
Substitutes:
GK	1	(Japan) Yohei Nishibe
DF	5	(Japan) Ichiei Muroi	(substituted on) 78'
MF	35	(Japan) Ryuji Michiki
MF	6	(Japan) Toshiya Ishii
FW	18	(Japan) Tatsuya Tanaka	(substituted on) 69'
Manager:
(Netherlands) Hans Ooft

== See also ==
- 2002 J.League Cup
