= Echendu Adiele =

Nigerian footballer (1978–2011)

Personal information
- Date of birth: 17 November 1978
- Place of birth: Port Harcourt, Nigeria
- Date of death: 18 June 2011 (aged 32)
- Place of death: Port Harcourt, Nigeria
- Position: Central defender

Senior career*
Years	Team	Apps	(Gls)
1995–1997	Sharks		
1997–1998	Fortuna Düsseldorf	1	(0)
1998–1999	Borussia Neunkirchen	15	(4)
1999–2006	1. FC Saarbrücken	149	(2)
2006–2007	SV Darmstadt 98	28	(1)
2007–2009	SV Waldhof Mannheim	31	(0)
2009–2010	SV Darmstadt 98	33	(0)
Total		257	(7)
- * Club domestic league appearances and goals

Echendu Adiele (17 November 1978 – 18 June 2011) was a Nigerian professional footballer who played as a central defender.

== Career ==
Adiele played club football in Nigeria for Sharks, and in Germany for Fortuna Düsseldorf, Borussia Neunkirchen, 1. FC Saarbrücken, SV Darmstadt 98 and SV Waldhof Mannheim.

== Death ==
Adiele died in his sleep on 18 June 2011. It seems that he was poisoned.
