= Henk Hofs =

Dutch footballer (1951–2011)

Personal information
- Date of birth: 5 May 1951
- Place of birth: Arnhem, Netherlands
- Date of death: 11 October 2011 (aged 60)
- Place of death: Arnhem, Netherlands
- Position: Midfielder

Senior career*
Years	Team	Apps	(Gls)
1970–1973	Vitesse	5	(0)
- * Club domestic league appearances and goals

Henk Hofs (5 May 1951 – 11 October 2011) was a Dutch professional footballer. Hofs played for Vitesse Arnhem between 1970 and 1973, before retiring due to a knee injury.

He was the brother of Bennie Hofs and uncle of Nicky Hofs.

He died on 11 October 2011, at the age of 60.
