= Giorgio Bernardin =

Italian footballer

Personal information
- Date of birth: 24 April 1928
- Place of birth: Bonassola, Italy
- Date of death: 28 June 2011 (aged 83)
- Place of death: Italy
- Position: Defender

Senior career*
Years	Team	Apps	(Gls)
1949–1950	Sampdoria	0	(0)
1950–1952	Lecce	66	(1)
1952–1954	SPAL 1907	60	(2)
1954–1958	Internazionale	79	(1)
1955–1956	→ Triestina (loan)	33	(0)
1958–1959	Triestina	31	(0)
1959–1960	Roma	4	(0)
Total		273	(4)

International career
1954	Italy B	1	(0)
- * Club domestic league appearances and goals

Giorgio Bernardin (24 April 1928 – 28 June 2011) was an Italian professional footballer who played as a defender for Sampdoria, Lecce, SPAL 1907, Internazionale, Triestina and Roma, as well as for Italy B.

After retiring from professional football, Bernardin was involved with the building of a hotel in his hometown of Bonassola.

Bernardin died on 28 June 2011.
