= Julien Bailleul =

French footballer (1988-2011)

Personal information
- Full name: Julien Bailleul
- Date of birth: 15 February 1988
- Place of birth: Lomme, France
- Date of death: 7 October 2011 (aged 23)
- Place of death: Belgium
- Height: 1.83 m (6 ft 0 in)
- Position: Defender

Youth career
- Lille

Senior career*
| Years | Team | Apps | (Gls) |
| 2005–2006 | Sedan B | | |
| 2006–2007 | Cambrai | | |
| 2007–2009 | Feignies | | |
| 2009–2010 | Mons | 32 | (1) |
| 2010–2011 | Lokeren | 8 | (0) |
| 2011 | → Mons (loan) | 13 | (0) |
- * Club domestic league appearances and goals

Julien Bailleul (15 February 1988 – 7 October 2011) was a French footballer who played for Mons and Lokeren.

== Club career ==
Born in the Lille region, Bailleul began playing football with the Lille OSC youth academy. He also played youth football for CS Sedan Ardennes and AC Cambrai.

=== Belgium ===
He played amateur football for SC Feignies from 2007 to 2009 before signing a professional contract with Belgian Second Division side R.A.E.C. Mons.

The following season, Bailleul transferred to Belgian Pro League side Sporting Lokeren but returned on loan to Mons in January 2011. Two months later he was forced to stop playing after suffering from illness.

== Death ==
After battling the disease for several months, he died of cancer at age 23 in October 2011. He was buried in Lambersart on 11 October 2011.
