= Stanko Opsenica =

- Born: November 27, 1907
- Died: January 15, 1943 (aged 35)
- Occupation: Yugoslav Partisan

Stanko Opsenica Staniša (Ljubovo, near Korenica, November 27, 1907 — Gračac, January 15, 1943), participant in the National Liberation War and national hero of Yugoslavia.

== Biography ==
He was born on November 27, 1907, in Ljubovo, near Korenica, in Lika. In 1941, he was one of the organizers of the popular uprising in Lika against the fascists and the Ustashe. His brothers Aleksa and Stevan Opsenica also participated in the uprising.

From April 1942, he was the commander of the "Ognjen Prica" Battalion within the Second Lika Partisan Detachment, which on August 22 became part of the Second Lika Proletarian Shock Brigade. During the summer of 1942, he was admitted to the membership of the Communist Party of Yugoslavia (KPJ).

He was killed by the Italians on January 15, 1943, during a partisan attack on Gračac. He was proclaimed a National Hero of Yugoslavia on September 16, 1945.
