= William Morais =

Brazilian footballer

Personal information
- Full name: William Francis de Oliveira Morais
- Date of birth: 1 March 1991
- Place of birth: São Paulo, Brazil
- Date of death: 6 February 2011 (aged 19)
- Place of death: Belo Horizonte, Brazil
- Height: 1.88 m (6 ft 2 in)
- Position: Attacking midfielder

Youth career
- –2008: São Paulo
- 2008–2010: Corinthians

Senior career*
Years	Team	Apps	(Gls)
2010–2011	Corinthians	8	(1)
2010	→ Nacional (SP) (loan)		
2011	→ América (MG) (loan)	1	(0)
- * Club domestic league appearances and goals

William Francis de Oliveira Morais (1 March 1991 – 6 February 2011) was a Brazilian footballer.

== Career ==
Morais started in football on the youth squad of the Corinthians. With good performances in the Copa São Paulo de Juniores and the Campeonato Paulista de Juniores, the midfielder was named by coach Mano Menezes to join the core team of the Corinthians.

Morais was killed in a robbery attempt in Belo Horizonte. Police say the 19-year-old midfielder on loan to Minas Gerais's América FC was shot in the back early Sunday, 6 February 2011. He was returning home from a party when he was attacked by three robbers. Corinthians president Andres Sanchez reacted with anger to the news, calling it a "horrific crime that ended the life of a young man with a brilliant future."

== Career statistics ==
=== Club ===
Club	Season	League			State league		Cup		Continental		Other		Total	
Club	Season	Division	Apps	Goals	Apps	Goals	Apps	Goals	Apps	Goals	Apps	Goals	Apps	Goals
Corinthians	2010	Série A	8	1	0	0	0	0	0	0	2	2	10	3
Corinthians	2011	Série A	0	0	0	0	0	0	0	0	0	0	0	0
Corinthians	Total		8	1	0	0	0	0	0	0	2	2	10	3
América (MG) (loan)	2011	Série A	0	0	1 (Note: Appearances in the Campeonato Mineiro)	0	0	0	0	0	2	0	3	0
Career total			8	1	1	0	0	0	0	0	4	2	13	3
