= Álvaro Lara =

Chilean footballer (1984-2011)

Personal information
- Full name: Álvaro Fabián Lara Saldías
- Date of birth: 26 August 1984
- Place of birth: Linares, Chile
- Date of death: 13 August 2011 (aged 26)
- Place of death: San Javier, Chile
- Height: 1.74 m (5 ft 9 in)
- Position: Striker

Youth career
- 1996–2003: Universidad Católica

Senior career*
| Years | Team | Apps | (Gls) |
| 2004–2006 | Universidad Católica | ? | (?) |
| 2007 | Deportes Linares | ? | (?) |
| 2008 | Deportes Concepción | 12 | (2) |
| 2008–2009 | Curicó Unido | 25 | (4) |
| 2010 | Rangers | 13 | (2) |
- * Club domestic league appearances and goals as of 13 March 2012

Álvaro Fabián Lara Saldías (26 August 1984 – 13 August 2011) was a Chilean footballer who played as a striker. His last club was Rangers de Talca of the Primera B in the 2010 season.

== Career ==
Lara began his football career in Universidad Católica and was promoted to the first adult team in 2004. Two years later, he left the club and in January 2007, Álvaro signed for his local village team Deportes Linares. After an entire season in Third Division with Linares, he was scouted by Deportes Concepción and they signed him the next season. However, despite his performances with the Lions of Ñielol, Lara abandoned the club for financial problems and later he joined Curicó Unido of the Primera B, where he won the promotion title. In 2010, he signed for Rangers, but he was released at the end of the season.

On 13 August 2011, Lara, while travelling with two friends, crashed his car into a wagon driven by a drunk driver. The accident occurred along Chile Route 5, in San Javier. He was taken to Regional Hospital of the Maule, where he died as a result of his injuries.

== Honours ==
=== Club ===
Universidad Católica

- Primera División de Chile (2): 2005 Clausura

Curicó Unido

- Primera B (1): 2008
