= 2010–11 Campeonato Nacional de Fútbol de Cuba =

Campeonato Nacional de Fútbol de Cuba
- Season: 2010–11
- Champions: Villa Clara
- Premiers: Camagüey
- Relegated: La Habana
- Top goalscorer: Sander Fernández

The 2010–11 Campeonato Nacional de Fútbol de Cuba was the 100th season of the highest division of Cuban football, and the first season under its present format.

Eight clubs competed in the regular season, which was played on a balanced schedule, tallying to a total of 14 regular season matches. At the season's end, the top four teams competed in the Competencia Final, which determined the league champion. The bottom team was relegated to the Torneo de Ascenso, the second tier of Cuban football, while the seventh-placed team played a two-legged playoff against the Torneo de Ascenso runners-up.

The premiers were Camagüey and the champions were Villa Clara.

== Changes from 2009–10 ==
=== Structural changes ===
The competition was modified to a more traditional format. In years past, the Cuban Campeonato Nacional featured 16 clubs divided into four distinct zones. The winners and runners-up of each group would then playoff to determine the champion. Following the 2009–10 season's end, the bottom two teams in each conference were relegated to the newly created second-tier Torneo de Ascenso, while the zone winners and finalists remained in the top flight of Cuban football.

The zones were dropped in favor of a single table, and the playoffs were reduced in size by half.

=== Relegated teams ===
The following clubs were relegated for the new season. Due to the structural shift, no new teams were added this season.

- CF Granma (Bayamo)
- FC Santiago de Cuba
- FC Sancti Spíritus
- FC Pinar del Río (San Cristóbal)
- FC Holguín (Banes)
- FC Isla de La Juventud (Nueva Gerona)
- FC Industriales (La Habana)
- FC Matanzas

== Teams ==
=== Club information ===
| Club | Home city | Home ground |
|---|---|---|
| FC Camagüey | Camagüey | Estado Lumumba |
| FC Ciego de Ávila | Morón | Estadio Cepero |
| FC Cienfuegos | Cienfuegos | Estadio Lozano |
| FC Ciudad de La Habana | Guanajay | Estadio Guanajay |
| FC Guantánamo | Guantánamo | Nguyen Van Troi Stadium |
| FC La Habana | Havana | Estadio Pedro Marrero |
| FC Las Tunas | Manatí | Estadio Ovidio Torres |
| FC Villa Clara | Zulueta | Estadio Camilo Cienfuegos |

== Table ==
=== Regular Stage ===
| Pos | Team | Pld | W | D | L | GF | GA | GD | Pts | Qualification or relegation |
|---|---|---|---|---|---|---|---|---|---|---|
| 1 | Camagüey | 14 | 6 | 5 | 3 | 18 | 9 | +9 | 23 | Competencia Final |
| 2 | Villa Clara | 14 | 6 | 4 | 4 | 16 | 10 | +6 | 22 | Competencia Final |
| 3 | Ciudad de La Habana | 14 | 5 | 6 | 3 | 18 | 3 | +15 | 21 | Competencia Final |
| 4 | Guantánamo | 14 | 5 | 6 | 3 | 16 | 13 | +3 | 21 | Competencia Final |
| 5 | Las Tunas | 14 | 4 | 5 | 5 | 17 | 18 | −1 | 17 | |
| 6 | Ciego de Ávila | 14 | 5 | 2 | 7 | 13 | 15 | −2 | 17 | |
| 7 | Cienfuegos | 14 | 4 | 4 | 6 | 12 | 21 | −9 | 16 | Relegation playoffs |
| 8 | La Habana (R) | 14 | 3 | 4 | 7 | 9 | 20 | −11 | 13 | Relegation to 2011–12 Torneo de Ascenso |

Source: FIFA
Rules for classification: 1) points; 2) goal difference; 3) number of goals scored.
(R) Relegated

=== Competencia Final ===
Following the regular stage, the top four clubs competed in a two-legged playoff series to determine the league champion. Villa Clara won the tournament and thus the 2010–11 season.

Semifinals
1 | Camagüey | 2 | 3 | 5
4 | Guantánamo | 2 | 4 | 6
2 | Villa Clara | 3 | 3 | 6
3 | Ciudad de La Habana | 3 | 2 | 5

Final
4 | Guantánamo | 0 | 0 | 0
2 | Villa Clara | 2 | 1 | 3

2010–11 Campeonato Nacional champion
Villa Clara
11th title

=== Promotion/relegation playoff ===
The 7th placed Campeonato Nacional club, Cienfuegos played the Torneo de Ascenso playoff winner, Isla de La Juventud.

6 July 2011
18:00

| Isla de La Juventud | 1 – 1 | Cienfuegos |
|---|---|---|
| | Report |

Estadio El Rodeo, Nueva Gerona

9 July 2011
18:00

| Cienfuegos | 4 – 1 | Isla de La Juventud |
|---|---|---|
| | Report |

Estadio Luis Pérez Lozano, Cienfuegos

Cienfuegos win 5–2 on aggregate
