= George Clarke (footballer, born 1921) =

English footballer

Personal information
- Full name: George Edmund Clarke
- Date of birth: 24 April 1921
- Place of birth: Ipswich, England
- Date of death: 17 February 2011 (aged 89)
- Position: Centre half

Senior career*
Years	Team	Apps	(Gls)
1946–1953	Ipswich Town	34	(1)
- * Club domestic league appearances and goals

George Edmund Clarke (24 April 1921 – 17 February 2011) was an English professional footballer who played as a centre half.

== Career ==
Clarke made 34 appearances for Ipswich Town in the Football League between 1946 and 1953, scoring one goal. He also made 3 Cup appearances for the Ipswich first-team, as well as over 200 games for the reserve side.

== Later life and death ==
Clarke died on 17 February 2011, at the age of 89.
