= Šopić =

Coordinates: 44.4003°N 20.2614°E

- Village
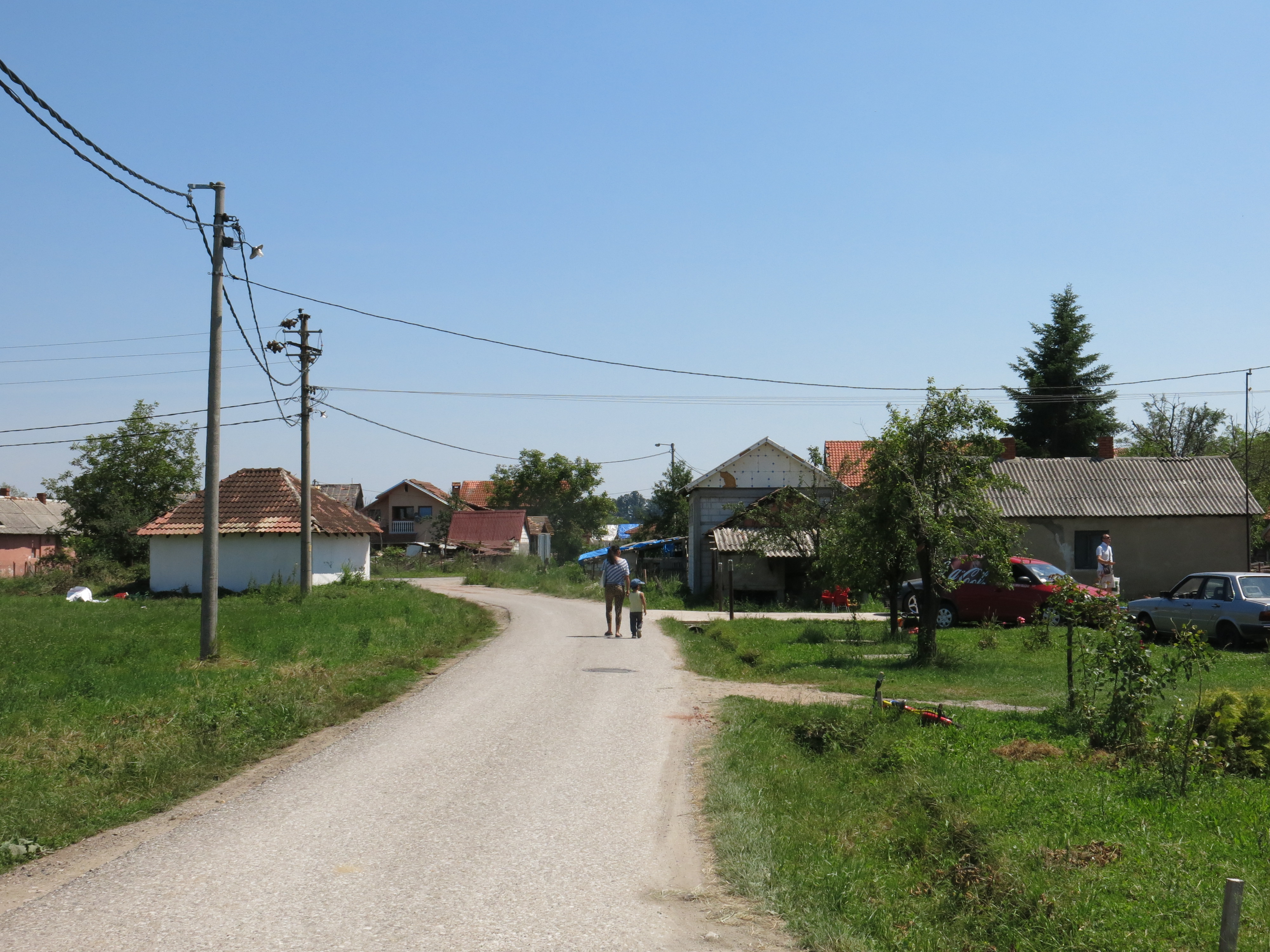
- Street of Šopić
- Interactive map of Šopić
- Country: Serbia
- Municipality: Lazarevac

Area
  - Total: 14.78 km^{2} (5.71 sq mi)
- Elevation: 137 m (449 ft)

Population (2011)
  - Total: 2,619
  - Density: 177.2/km^{2} (458.9/sq mi)
- Time zone: UTC+1 (CET)
  - Summer (DST): UTC+2 (CEST)

Šopić is a village situated in Lazarevac municipality in Serbia.
