= Josep Artigas =

Spanish post-war poster creator

Josep Artigas Ojeda (1919 — October 16, 1992) was a Spanish post-war poster creator and an honorary member of the ADG (Association of Art Directors and Graphic Designers)-FAD (Decorative Arts).

== Biography ==
He was born in Barcelona and studied at the Escola de la Llotja and Cercle Artístic de Sant Lluc.

Before the Spanish Civil War, he worked in a company dedicated to graphic arts where he made his first two advertising posters. During the war, he devoted himself to designing banknotes, as he described it "War banknotes".

== Advertising ==
He worked in the advertising department of the chemical company “Cruz Verde" and came to lead the advertising department. In 1948, he made the famous advertisement for "POLIL" which shows a warm coat studying a huge hole a moth has made in its back.

Later, in 1950, Artigas presented other ads, which over time have held a place of honour in the history of the iconography of Spanish advertising: the lamb of "NORIT".

In 1954, he designed the advertising poster for soap powder to wash clothes by hand Duxón of Persil.

In the First Great Poster Contest "The Milkmaid" of "Nestle" in Spain, in order to "reassess the outdoor advertising and our signs offer the opportunity to show their new styles and brilliant qualities" an honorable mention was made to Josep Artigas.

For ten years he set up his own studio in Switzerland (1955–1965), working mainly for Swiss-German and Swiss-French companies. Among the highlights are works made for brands such as:

- Nestlé
- Swiss
- Philip Morris
- For the Alpine resort Leysin
- For the Alpine resort Vevey to the Italian Department of Tourism
- Jaffa oranges (Israel).
- Cruz Verde
- Mountaineering Club
- Advertising blotter Ink Samas
- Jaffa Orange 1961,
- AG Bell in Basel 1964,

On his return to Spain and while he was director of corporate advertising Pujol & Tarragó (logo he designed in 1950), the beginning of what is now the International Ficosa group, designed the group's corporate image and the logos of several subsidiaries such as Cables Gandia, FicoMirrors, Industries Technoflex this company in the late 1970s for the concrete vibrator launched its Rabbit which has always been its flagship product. The logo and brand image for Rabbit which was designed by Josep Artigas and the product itself, are renowned in their field.

Artigas also had important design dealings with Bulova watches and clocks, Tri Naranjus fruit-flavored drinks bottles and labels, Codorniu Cava bottles and labels, Perelada Cava and wine bottles and labels, Torres wine bottle labels, Juve i Camps Cava' and wines bottles and labels.

The last prints and paintings he created, exhibited in Barcelona in 1991 with the title of The Alphabet Art, introduced a colorful new technique developed from a dried hand moulded wet papier-mâché and different types of pigment or paint.

== Mountaineering ==
As a trekker, skier and climber, he was a well-known member of the Barcelona mountaineering club, Centre Excursionista de Catalunya, and actively participated in the Grup Cavall Bernat brotherhood inspired in the training, and climbed Cavall Bernat near the Monastery of Montserrat.

He collaborated with his drawings in several books:

- Dictionary of the Mountain (1963) Costa Faus Augustine
- Climbing Ernesto Mallafré (Barcelona 1948 and 1954)
- First aid in accidents and ski mountain (Barcelona 1952) by Drs Michael Gras and Jorge Eduardo Padrós Perelló

Artigas invented a device with a beam acting as dynamic brake. Equipped with this device, Artigas alone scaled the mountain of Montserrat.
