= Peter Feteris =

Dutch footballer (1952–2011)

Personal information
- Full name: Petrus Hendrikus Maria Feteris
- Date of birth: 7 May 1952
- Place of birth: Rotterdam, Netherlands
- Date of death: 7 February 2011 (aged 58)
- Position: Winger

Senior career*
Years	Team	Apps	(Gls)
1972–1973	Feyenoord	4	(0)
1973–1975	Haarlem	35	(2)
1975–1978	Union St Gilloise		
1976–1978	→ Dordrecht (loan)	42	(7)
1978–1979	Troyes Aube	9	(1)
1979–1980	Roubaix Football	4	(0)
Total		94	(10)
- * Club domestic league appearances and goals

Peter Feteris (7 May 1952 – 7 February 2011) was a Dutch professional footballer who played as a winger.

== Club career ==
Feteris made his professional debut for Feyenoord on 1 October 1972 against FC Den Bosch, and later played for Haarlem and FC Dordrecht. He also had a spell in Belgium with Union Saint-Gilloise and in France.

== Later life and death ==
Feteris died on 7 February 2011, at the age of 58.
