= ASC Black Stars =

Black Stars
- League: Championnat National
Home colours	Away colours

ASC Black Stars are a French Guiana football club that play in the French Guiana Championnat National.
