= 2010–11 French Guiana Division d'Honneur =

French Guiana Division d'Honneur
- Season: 2010–11
- Champions: Matoury
- Relegated: Olympique Cayenne; Balata Abriba
- Coupe de France: Matoury

The 2010–11 French Guiana Division d'Honneur was the 38th season of the top tier of football in Guyana. The champions were US Matoury who won their third league title, and their first since 2005–06.

== Changes from 2009–10 ==
- Cosma Foot and Olympique Cayenne were relegated to the French Guiana Promotion d'Honneur.
- EF Iracoubo and ASC Black Stars were promoted to the Championnat National

== Table ==
Pos	Team	Pld	W	D	L	GF	GA	GD	Pts	Qualification or relegation
1	Matoury (C)	22	16	4	2	60	17	+43	74	2011–12 Coupe de France
2	Le Geldar	22	14	4	4	36	13	+23	68	
3	CSC de Cayenne	22	10	8	4	40	26	+14	60	
4	Sinnamary	22	10	6	6	35	27	+8	58	
5	Macouria	22	10	5	7	24	21	+3	57	
6	Saint-Georges	22	9	5	8	30	28	+2	54	
7	ASC Black Stars	22	8	8	6	27	22	+5	54	
8	Agouado	22	6	4	12	37	45	−8	44	
9	Remire	22	4	9	9	25	36	−11	43	
10	Iracoubo	22	6	3	13	30	44	−14	43	
11	Olympique Cayenne (R)	22	4	8	10	19	41	−22	42	Relegation to 2011–12 French Guiana Promotion d'Honneur
12	Balata Abriba (R)	22	2	2	18	14	57	−43	30	Relegation to 2011–12 French Guiana Promotion d'Honneur

Source: RSSSF
Rules for classification: 1) points; 2) goal difference; 3) number of goals scored.
(C) Champions; (R) Relegated

== Related competitions ==
=== Coupe de France ===
As winners of the 2009–10 French Guiana Championnat National, ASC Le Geldar earned a berth in the overseas bracket in the seventh round proper of the Coupe de France. Le Geldar played amateur French side, FC Martigues and lost 2–0.

=== CFU Club Championship ===
For the 2011 edition of the CFU Club Championship, French Guiana was allowed to send two representatives to the tournament, but declined to participate.

=== CONCACAF Champions League ===
As no French Guiana clubs entered in the 2010 CFU Club Championship, no teams from the Championnat National played in the Champions League.
