= 2010–11 U.S. Virgin Islands Championship =

The 2010–11 U.S. Virgin Islands Championship was the planned 13th season of the competition, but was cancelled through the virtue of the St Thomas League canceling its season.

== Table ==
=== St Croix League ===
1.Unique FC          6   5  1  0     16
2. Helenites          6   5  0  1     15
3.Rovers             6   4  1  1     13
4.Prankton United    6   3  1  2     10
 .Chelsea
 .Free Will
 .Skills

=== St Thomas League ===
1.New Vibes          3   3  0  0      9
2.Raymix             4   3  0  1      9
3.Laraza             3   2  0  1      6
4.Upsetters          4   1  0  3      3
5.Waitikibuli        4   0  0  4      0
