= Football in Belize =

- Country: Belize
- Governing body: Football Federation of Belize
- National team: Men's national team

Club competitions
- Premier League of Belize

International competitions
- CONCACAF Champions Cup; CONCACAF Central American Cup; FIFA Club World Cup; CONCACAF Gold Cup (National Team); CONCACAF Nations League (National Team); FIFA World Cup (National Team); CONCACAF Women's Championship (National Team); CONCACAF W Gold Cup (National Team); FIFA Women's World Cup (National Team)

The sport of association football in the country of Belize is run by the Football Federation of Belize. The association administers the Belize national football team, as well as the Premier League of Belize. Football is the most popular sport in Belize.

== Origins ==
Football was played only in the port city of Belize City where, since 1919/20, a regional soccer championship was held each year, dominated by a team called Preston in the first decade. On occasion, teams from other parts of the country also competed in this league. It was only in the 1970s that a country-wide first league called the Interdistrict Championship established itself. This resulted in the Belize Premier Football League, which lasted until the 2011 season, when it merged with the Super League of Belize to form the Premier League.

== International tournaments ==
Both the club teams and the national team played only a subordinate role on the international level and have hardly left any mark on international football. The biggest success of the national team was a fourth place at the Copa Centroamericana of 2013, when Belize were able to prevail in the pre-season group against Guatemala (0-0) and Nicaragua (2-1) and advanced to the semi-final. There, the team lost 0-1 to Honduras and then in the game for third place with the same result against El Salvador. Belize was the only one to participate in the 2013 CONCACAF Gold Cup, where Belize lost all her games (1-6 against the US\, 0-1 against Costa Rica and 0-4 against Cuba).

== League system ==
Level	League(s)/Division(s)
1	Premier League of Belize; 8 clubs
