= Roy Greenwood (footballer, born 1931) =

English footballer

Personal information
- Date of birth: 22 May 1931
- Place of birth: Croydon, England
- Date of death: 31 December 2011 (aged 80)
- Place of death: Caterham, England
- Position: Left back

Senior career*
| Years | Team | Apps | (Gls) |
- Beckenham Town
| 1954–1959 | Crystal Palace | 111 | (0) |
- Bedford Town
- * Club domestic league appearances and goals

Roy Greenwood (22 May 1931 – 31 December 2011) was an English professional footballer who played as a left back.

== Career ==
Born in Croydon, Greenwood made 111 appearances in the Football League for Crystal Palace. He also played non-league football for Beckenham Town and Bedford Town.

== Later life and death ==
Greenwood died in a Caterham nursing home on 31 December 2011, at the age of 80.
