= Aruwa Ameh =

Nigerian footballer

Personal information
- Date of birth: 10 December 1990
- Date of death: 28 November 2011 (aged 20)
- Place of death: Kaduna, Nigeria
- Position: Striker

Senior career*
Years	Team	Apps	(Gls)
2007	Kaduna United F.C.		
2008–2011	Bayelsa United F.C.		
- * Club domestic league appearances and goals

Aruwa Ameh (10 December 1990 – 28 November 2011) was a Nigerian professional footballer. He last played for Bayelsa United in the Nigeria National League. In 2007 while playing with Kaduna United he was the top scorer in the Nigeria Premier League. Ameh died of paralysis almost a week after being hospitalized for arm pain in 2011 at Kaduna.
