= Cars Plus FC =

Soccer club in Guam

Cars Plus
- Full name: Cars Plus FC
- Stadium: Guam National Training Facility
- Capacity: 1,000
- Chairman: Nicolas Ramos
- Manager: Vicente Lorenzo
- League: Guam Soccer League
- 2011–12: 4th

Cars Plus is a football (soccer) club in Guam. They play in the Guam Soccer League.

== Achievements ==
- Guam Soccer League
  - Champions (1): 2010–11
