= Football in Cuba =

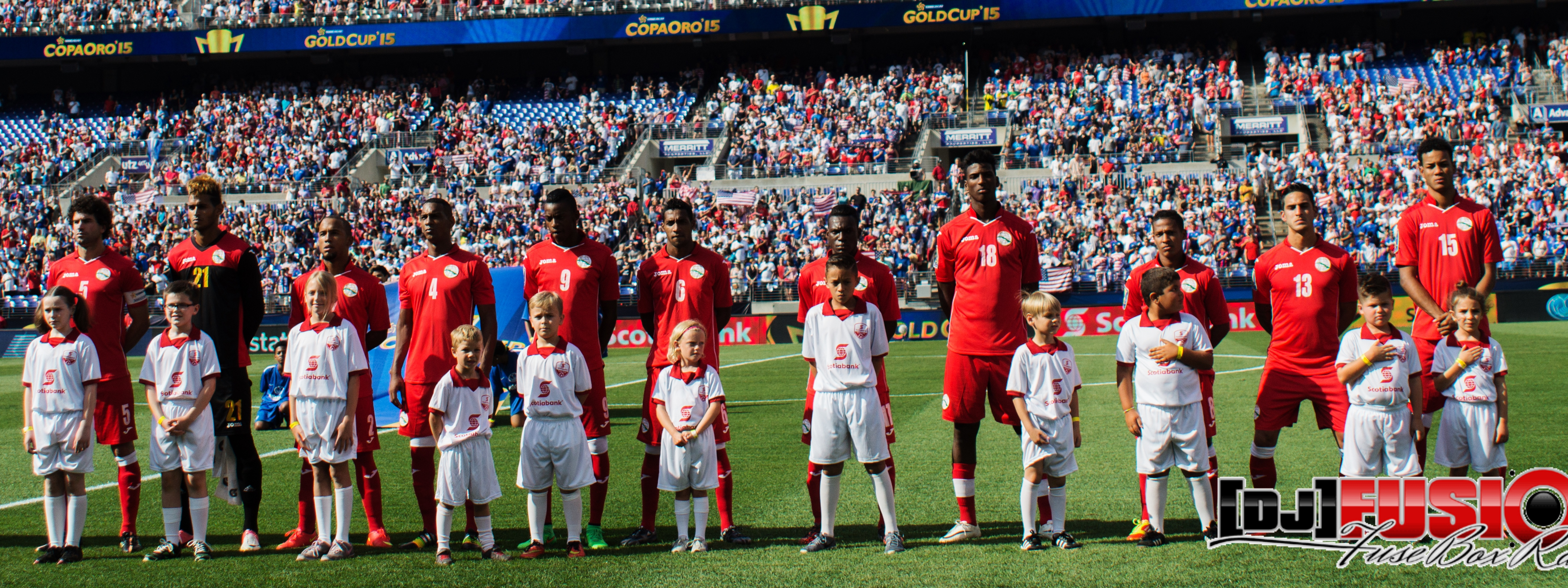
- Country: Cuba
- Governing body: Asociación de Fútbol de Cuba
- National team: men's national team

Club competitions
- Campeonato Nacional de Fútbol de Cuba

International competitions
- CONCACAF Champions League; Caribbean Club Shield; FIFA Club World Cup; CONCACAF Gold Cup; CONCACAF Nations League

Football in Cuba is run by the Asociación de Fútbol de Cuba. The association administers the national teams, as well as the Campeonato Nacional.

Football has been very popular among young people and the new generations in Cuba, being among two most popular national sports. Approximately 40% of the people in Cuba are considered association football fans.

== History ==
The first recorded football match in Cuba was in 1901. Football has struggled as sport in Cuba since Baseball is the number one sport in the country. Since the beginning of the 21st century, football has enjoyed a surge of popularity amongst the youth since Raúl Castro eased restrictions media. This has allowed for international football to be televised, starting with the 2010 World Cup. La Liga, and particularly Real Madrid and Barcelona are popular amongst the youth.

== Professional football ==
Professional sports have been forbidden by the Cuban government since 1961, but in 2016, Maikel Reyes became the first Cuban to be allowed to sign a professional contract with a foreign team when he joined Mexican third-tier side Cruz Azul Premier. Until then, Cuban footballers who played professionally had done so without approval of the country's football association and after fleeing the country.

== League system ==
Campeonato Nacional de Fútbol de Cuba is national top league where usually 16 clubs are split into four groups of four.

=== 2019 ===
Level	League(s)/Division(s)
1	Campeonato Nacional de Fútbol de Cuba; 16 clubs

== National team ==
Cuba has only qualified for the world cup once in 1938 and were eliminated in the quarter-finals. They lost 8–0 to Sweden.

Traditionally one of the weaker teams in CONCACAF has seen significant improvement qualifying for the Gold Cup, and reaching the quarter-finals in 2015 and 2017.

Cuban professional players from abroad are recruited to improve the national football team.

== Football stadiums ==
Stadium	City	Capacity	Tenants	Image
Estadio Pedro Marrero	Havana	30,000	Cuba national football team	

== Attendances ==
The average attendance per top-flight football league season and the club with the highest average attendance:

Season	League average	Best club	Best club average
2018	233	Santiago de Cuba	417

Source: League page on Wikipedia

== See also ==
- Lists of stadiums
