= 2019 Seychelles First Division =

Seychelles First Division
- Season: 2019

The 2019 Seychelles First Division is the 40th season of Seychelles First Division, the top-tier football league in Seychelles. The season started on 9 March 2019.

Due to transitional season, the teams are divided into two mini-leagues. There are no official overall champions.

== Mahé League ==
Some results are unknown and have been inferred.

Pos	Team	Pld	W	D	L	GF	GA	GD	Pts
1	Northern Dynamo	11	7	3	1	19	11	+8	24
2	Saint Louis Suns United	11	6	4	1	22	13	+9	22
3	Saint Michel	12	5	6	1	26	12	+14	21
4	Foresters (Mont Fleuri)	9	3	4	2	14	11	+3	13
5	Red Star Defence Forces	10	3	2	5	13	12	+1	11
6	Victoria City	12	2	4	6	15	29	−14	10
7	Au Cap	11	0	1	10	12	33	−21	1

Updated to match(es) played on 3 August 2019. Source: RSSSF.com

== Inner-Island League ==
Some results are unknown and have been inferred.

Pos	Team	Pld	W	D	L	GF	GA	GD	Pts
1	La Passe	12	8	3	1	27	9	+18	27
2	Côte d'Or	12	8	3	1	28	13	+15	27
3	Light Stars	12	4	1	7	22	18	+4	13
4	Anse Réunion	11	3	2	6	9	16	−7	11
5	Revengers	11	1	1	9	7	37	−30	4

Updated to match(es) played on 3 August 2019. Source: RSSSF.com
