= 2017 Seychelles First Division =

Seychelles First Division
- Season: 2017
- Champions: Saint Louis Suns United

The 2017 Seychelles First Division is the top level football competition in Seychelles. It had started on 2 March 2017.

== Standings ==
Pos	Team	Pld	W	D	L	GF	GA	GD	Pts	Qualification or relegation
1	Saint Louis Suns United	22	17	3	2	48	14	+34	54	Champions
2	Côte d'Or FC	22	15	4	3	62	23	+39	49	
3	La Passe FC	22	13	3	6	56	39	+17	42	
4	Saint Michel FC	22	10	5	7	45	36	+9	35	
5	Northern Dynamo	10	10	0	0	38	33	+5	30	
6	Light Stars FC	22	8	6	8	37	31	+6	30	
7	The Lions	22	8	6	8	28	35	−7	30	
8	Anse Réunion FC	9	8	0	1	18	34	−16	24	
9	Red Star Defence Forces	8	6	0	2	30	47	−17	18	
10	Foresters (Mont Fleuri)	22	4	9	9	25	36	−11	21	
11	Revengers FC	10	6	0	4	27	51	−24	18	Qualification to relegation play-offs
12	Saint John Bosco	7	1	0	6	22	57	−35	3	Relegation to lower division

Updated to match(es) played on unknown. Source:
