= Ryan Henriette =

Seychelles footballer

Personal information
- Full name: Ryan Hubert Joshua Henriette
- Date of birth: 23 January 2000 (age 26)
- Place of birth: Mont Fleuri, Seychelles
- Position: Striker

Team information
- Current team: Foresters Mont Fleuri
- Number: 9

Senior career*
Years	Team	Apps	(Gls)
2017–	Foresters Mont Fleuri		
2018	→ Red Star Defense Forces (loan)		

International career^{‡}
2021–	Seychelles	19	(3)
- * Club domestic league appearances and goals ‡ National team caps and goals as of 18:01, 8 June 2024 (UTC)

Ryan Henriette (born 23 January 2000) is a Seychellois footballer who currently plays for Foresters Mont Fleuri of the Seychelles Premier League, and the Seychelles national team.

== Club career ==
In 2015 Henriette was named the MVP of the Airtel Rising Stars Tournament U15 division as he represented Mont Fleuri. By the 2017 season he was playing for Foresters Mont Fleuri in the Seychelles First Division.

The following season Henriette joined Red Star Defense Forces FC on loan. He made his league debut for the club on 8 June in a 3–1 victory over Northern Dynamo FC. After coming on as a substitute in the match, he nearly scored his first goal for the club shortly thereafter. For the 2019 season Henriette had returned to Foresters Mont Fleuri. He scored two goals in the final of the 2020 Seychelles FA Cup as Foresters defeated Côte d'Or FC 4–2 to win the cup title, in addition to winning the league championship that year.

== International career ==
Henriette represented the Seychelles at the youth level at the 2016 COSAFA Under-17 Championship and 2016 COSAFA U-20 Cup at age 16. In the former event, he was in the starting lineup as the Seychelles fell to South Africa to open the tournament. He was then part of the squad for 2017 Africa U-17 Cup of Nations qualification, 2019 Africa U-20 Cup of Nations qualification, and the 2019 COSAFA U-20 Cup.

Henriette was named to the senior squad for a friendly tournament in Comoros in September 2021. He made his senior debut in the team's opening match, a 1–7 defeat to the host nation on the first of that month. Henriette scored on his senior debut for his nation's only tally in the match. In March the following year he was part of the roster that competed against Lesotho in a two-match series as part of the Preliminary Round of 2023 Africa Cup of Nations qualification. Later that summer Henriette was named to the Seychelles roster for the 2022 COSAFA Cup. In his nation's final match of the Group Stage, Henriette scored against Comoros in what would ultimately be the team's only goal of the tournament.

=== International goals ===
Scores and results list the Seychelles' goal tally first.

No.	Date	Venue	Opponent	Score	Result	Competition
1	1 September 2021	Stade Omnisports de Malouzini, Moroni, Comoros	Comoros	1–6	1–7	Friendly
2	10 July 2022	Princess Magogo Stadium, KwaMashu, South Africa	Comoros	1–1	1–2	2022 COSAFA Cup
3	8 June 2024	Berkane Municipal Stadium, Berkane, Morocco	Gambia	1–1	1–5	2026 FIFA World Cup qualification
Last updated 8 June 2024

=== International career statistics ===
As of match played 8 June 2024

Seychelles national team
Year	Apps	Goals
2021	1	1
2022	9	1
2023	8	0
2024	1	1
Total	19	3
