= 2025–26 Seychelles Premier League =

Football league season

Absa Premier League
- Season: 2025–26
- Matches: 23
- Goals: 83 (3.61 per match)
- All statistics correct as of 15 October 2025.

The 2025–26 Seychelles Premier League is the 53rd consecutive season of the Seychelles Premier League. It is commonly referred to as the Absa Premier League due to sponsorship reasons, it is also referred as SFF Premier League Tournament named after the governing body, the Seychelles Football Federation.

Cote d'Or are defending the title as they won it in 2024-25 season.

== Teams ==
=== Locations ===
Location of teams in the 2025–26 Absa Premier League.

== Mahe Group ==
=== League table ===
Pos	Team	Pld	W	D	L	GF	GA	GD	Pts	Qualification or relegation
1	Bazar Brothers	5	4	1	0	12	7	+5	13	Qualification for Premier League semi finals
2	Real Maldive	5	3	0	2	11	10	+1	9	Qualification for Premier League semi finals
3	Bel Air	5	1	3	1	9	9	0	6	
4	St Michel United	4	1	1	2	9	9	0	4	
5	Foresters	4	1	1	2	6	6	0	4	
6	St Louis Suns United	5	0	2	3	7	13	−6	2	Relegation to Championship

Rules for classification: 1) points; 2) head-to-head points; 3) head-to-head goal difference; 4) head-to-head goals scored; 5) goal difference; 6) goals scored; 7) playoff.

== Inner Islands Group ==
=== League table ===
Pos	Team	Pld	W	D	L	GF	GA	GD	Pts	Qualification or relegation
1	Anse Reunion	5	3	1	1	8	3	+5	10	Qualification for Premier League semi finals
2	Light Stars	5	3	1	1	11	8	+3	10	Qualification for Premier League semi finals
3	Cote d'Or	3	0	3	0	5	5	0	3	
4	Revengers	5	0	1	4	5	13	−8	1	Relegation to Championship

Rules for classification: 1) points; 2) head-to-head points; 3) head-to-head goal difference; 4) head-to-head goals scored; 5) goal difference; 6) goals scored; 7) playoff.
