= 2018 Seychelles First Division =

Seychelles First Division
- Season: 2018
- Champions: Côte d'Or FC

The 2018 Seychelles First Division is the top level football competition in Seychelles. It started on 7 March and ended on 29 December 2018.

== Standings ==
Final table.

| Rank | Team | Pld | W | D | L | GF | GA | Pts | Notes |
|---|---|---|---|---|---|---|---|---|---|
| 1. | Côte d'Or (Praslin) (C) | 22 | 15 | 5 | 2 | 60 | 22 | 50 | Champions |
| 2. | Red Star Defence Forces | 22 | 14 | 7 | 1 | 51 | 21 | 49 | |
| 3. | Lightstars FC (Grande Anse) | 22 | 15 | 3 | 4 | 41 | 21 | 48 | |
| 4. | Saint Louis Suns United (Victoria) | 22 | 11 | 7 | 4 | 44 | 23 | 40 | |
| 5. | Saint Michel FC (Anse-aux-Pins) | 22 | 12 | 3 | 7 | 53 | 27 | 39 | |
| 6. | La Passe FC (La Passe) | 22 | 10 | 6 | 6 | 41 | 34 | 36 | |
| 7. | Foresters (Mont Fleuri) | 22 | 7 | 7 | 8 | 28 | 27 | 28 | |
| 8. | Anse Réunion FC (Anse Réunion) | 22 | 7 | 2 | 13 | 32 | 41 | 23 | |
| 9. | Revengers FC (Praslin) | 22 | 4 | 5 | 13 | 28 | 60 | 17 | |
| 10. | Northern Dynamo (Glacis) | 22 | 4 | 3 | 15 | 31 | 56 | 15 | |
| 11. | Au Cap | 22 | 4 | 3 | 15 | 25 | 59 | 15 | Relegation Playoff |
| 12. | The Lions (Cascade) | 22 | 3 | 1 | 18 | 15 | 58 | 10 | Relegated |
