= 2019 in association football =

The following were the events of association football for the year 2019 throughout the world.

== Events ==
=== FIFA ===
- 23 May – 15 June: 2019 FIFA U-20 World Cup in Poland
  - (gold) : Ukraine
  - (silver) : South Korea
  - (bronze) : Ecuador
  - 4th: Italy
- 7 June – 7 July: 2019 FIFA Women's World Cup in France
  - (gold) : United States
  - (silver) : Netherlands
  - (bronze) : Sweden
  - 4th: England
- 26 October – 17 November: 2019 FIFA U-17 World Cup in Brazil
  - (gold) : Brazil
  - (silver) : Mexico
  - (bronze) : France
  - 4th: Netherlands

=== AFC ===
- 5 January – 1 February: 2019 AFC Asian Cup in the United Arab Emirates
  - (gold) : Qatar
  - (silver) : Japan

=== CAF ===
- 21 June – 19 July: 2019 Africa Cup of Nations in Egypt
  - (gold) : Algeria
  - (silver) : Senegal
  - (bronze) : Nigeria
  - 4th: Tunisia
- 8–22 November: 2019 Africa U-23 Cup of Nations in Egypt
  - (gold) : Egypt
  - (silver) : Ivory Coast
  - (bronze) : South Africa
  - 4th: Ghana

=== CONCACAF ===
- 1–16 May: 2019 CONCACAF U-17 Championship in the United States
  - (gold) : Mexico
  - (silver) : United States
- 15 June – 7 July: 2019 CONCACAF Gold Cup in the United States, Costa Rica and Jamaica
  - (gold) : Mexico
  - (silver) : United States

=== CONMEBOL ===
- 17 January – 10 February: 2019 South American U-20 Championship in Chile
  - (gold) : Ecuador
  - (silver) : Argentina
  - (bronze) : Uruguay
  - 4th: Colombia
- 21 March – 14 April: 2019 South American U-17 Championship in Peru
  - (gold) : Argentina
  - (silver) : Chile
  - (bronze) : Paraguay
  - 4th: Ecuador
- 14 June – 7 July: 2019 Copa América in Brazil
  - (gold) : Brazil
  - (silver) : Peru
  - (bronze) : Argentina
  - 4th: Chile

=== UEFA ===
- 3–19 May: 2019 UEFA European Under-17 Championship in Republic of Ireland
  - (gold) : Netherlands
  - (silver) : Italy
- 5–17 May: 2019 UEFA Women's Under-17 Championship in Bulgaria
  - (gold) : Germany
  - (silver) : Netherlands
- 5–9 June: 2019 UEFA Nations League Finals in Portugal
  - (gold) : Portugal
  - (silver) : Netherlands
  - (bronze) : England
  - 4th: Switzerland
- 16–30 June: 2019 UEFA European Under-21 Championship in Italy and San Marino
  - (gold) : Spain
  - (silver) : Germany
- 14–27 July: 2019 UEFA European Under-19 Championship in Armenia
  - (gold) : Spain
  - (silver) : Portugal
- 16–28 July: 2019 UEFA Women's Under-19 Championship in Scotland
  - (gold) : France
  - (silver) : Germany

=== Non FIFA ===
- 1–9 June: 2019 CONIFA European Football Cup in (Republic of Artsakh) Artsakh
  - (gold) : South Ossetia
  - (silver) : Western Armenia
  - (bronze) : Abkhazia
  - 4th: Chameria
- 15–22 June: 2019 Inter Games Football Tournament in Anglesey
- Men's
  - (gold) : Ynys Môn
  - (silver) : Guernsey
  - (bronze) : Isle of Man
  - 4th: Shetland
- Women's
  - (gold) : Isle of Man
  - (silver) : Ynys Môn
  - (bronze) : Jersey
  - 4th: Hitra

=== North and Central America ===
- 28 February – 8 March: 2019 Windward Islands Tournament in Kingstown
  - (gold) : Saint Vincent and the Grenadines
  - (silver) : Barbados
  - (bronze) : Grenada
  - 4th: Dominica
- 30 June – 7 July: WIFA Women's Championships in Saint Lucia
  - (gold) : Saint Vincent and the Grenadines
  - (silver) : Saint Lucia
  - (bronze) : Dominica
  - 4th: Grenada

=== South America ===
- 25 July – 9 August: Football at the 2019 Pan American Games in Lima, Peru
- Men's
  - (gold) : Argentina
  - (silver) : Honduras
  - (bronze) : Mexico
  - 4th: Uruguay
- Women's
  - (gold) : Colombia
  - (silver) : Argentina
  - (bronze) : Costa Rica
  - 4th: Paraguay

=== Africa ===
- 8–18 May: 2019 WAFU Zone B Women's Cup in Ivory Coast
  - (gold) : Nigeria
  - (silver) : Ivory Coast
  - (bronze) : Ghana
  - 4th: Mali
- 25 May – 8 June: 2019 COSAFA Cup in South Africa
  - (gold) : Zambia
  - (silver) : Botswana
  - (bronze) : Zimbabwe
  - 4th: Lesotho
- 18–27 July: Football at the 2019 Indian Ocean Islands Games in Mauritius
  - (gold) : Réunion
  - (silver) : Mauritius
  - (bronze) : Mayotte
  - 4th: Seychelles
- 31 July – 11 August: 2019 COSAFA Women's Championship in Port Elizabeth
  - (gold) : South Africa
  - (silver) : Zambia
  - (bronze) : Zimbabwe
  - 4th: Botswana
- 1–11 August: 2019 COSAFA U-20 Women's Championship in South Africa
  - (gold) : Tanzania
  - (silver) : Zambia
  - (bronze) : South Africa
  - 4th: Zimbabwe

=== Asia ===
- 7–15 January: 2019 WAFF Women's Championship in Bahrain
  - (gold) : Jordan
  - (silver) : Bahrain
  - (bronze) : Lebanon
  - 4th: United Arab Emirates
- 17–26 February: 2019 AFF U-22 Youth Championship in Cambodia
  - (gold) : Indonesia
  - (silver) : Thailand
  - (bronze) : Vietnam
  - 4th: Cambodia
- 12–22 March: 2019 SAFF Women's Championship in Nepal
  - (gold) : India
  - (silver) : Nepal
- 9–21 May: 2019 AFF U-16 Girls' Championship in Chonburi
  - (gold) : Thailand
  - (silver) : Laos
  - (bronze) : Vietnam
  - 4th: Philippines
- 26 July – 1 August: 2019 CAFA Youth Championship in Dushanbe & Gissar
  - (gold) : Tajikistan
  - (silver) : Uzbekistan
  - (bronze) : Iran
  - 4th: Afghanistan
- 27 July – 9 August: 2019 AFF U-16 Youth Championship in Chonburi
  - (gold) : Malaysia
  - (silver) : Thailand
  - (bronze) : Indonesia
  - 4th: Vietnam
- 2–14 August: 2019 WAFF Championship in Iraq
  - (gold) : Bahrain
  - (silver) : Iraq
- 6–19 August: 2019 AFF U-19 Youth Championship in (Vietnam) Ho Chi Minh City
  - (gold) : Australia
  - (silver) : Malaysia
  - (bronze) : Indonesia
  - 4th: Myanmar
- 9–15 August: 2019 CAFA Junior Championship in Dushanbe
  - (gold) : Iran
  - (silver) : Tajikistan
  - (bronze) : Uzbekistan
  - 4th: Afghanistan
- 15–27 August: 2019 AFF Women's Championship in Chonburi
  - (gold) : Vietnam
  - (silver) : Thailand
  - (bronze) : Myanmar
  - 4th: Philippines
- 26 November – 8 December: 24th Arabian Gulf Cup in Qatar
  - (gold) : Bahrain
  - (silver) : Saudi Arabia
- 9–18 December: 2019 EAFF E-1 Football Championship in South Korea
  - (gold) : South Korea
  - (silver) : Japan
  - (bronze) : China
  - 4th: Hong Kong
- 10–17 December: 2019 EAFF E-1 Football Championship (women) in South Korea
  - (gold) : Japan
  - (silver) : South Korea
  - (bronze) : China
  - 4th: Chinese Taipei

=== Men's championships and tournaments ===
- 20–23 March: 2019 Airmarine Cup in Kuala Lumpur
  - (gold) : Oman
  - (silver) : Singapore
  - (bronze) : Malaysia
  - 4th: Afghanistan
- 20–26 March: 2019 International Friendship Championship in Basra
  - (gold) : Iraq
  - (silver) : Syria
  - (bronze) : Jordan
- 21–25 March: 2019 China Cup in Nanning
  - (gold) : Uruguay
  - (silver) : Thailand
  - (bronze) : Uzbekistan
  - 4th: China
- 25–29 May: 2019 Panda Cup in China
  - (gold) : South Korea
  - (silver) : Thailand
  - (bronze) : New Zealand
  - 4th: China
- 1–15 June: 2019 Toulon Tournament in France
  - (gold) : Brazil
  - (silver) : Japan
  - (bronze) : Mexico
  - 4th: Republic of Ireland
- 5–8 June: 2019 King's Cup in Thailand
  - (gold) : Curaçao
  - (silver) : Vietnam
  - (bronze) : India
  - 4th: Thailand
- 7–9 June: 2019 Merlion Cup in Singapore
  - (gold) : Singapore
  - (silver) : Thailand
  - (bronze) : Indonesia
  - 4th: Philippines
- 7–18 July: 2019 Intercontinental Cup in Ahmedabad
  - (gold) : North Korea
  - (silver) : Tajikistan
  - (bronze) : Syria
  - 4th: India
- 28 July – 8 August: 2019 COTIF Tournament in L'Alcúdia
  - (gold) : Spain
  - (silver) : Russia

=== Women's championships and tournaments ===
- 17–20 January: 2019 Four Nations Tournament in Meizhou
  - (gold) : China
  - (silver) : South Korea
  - (bronze) : Nigeria
  - 4th: Romania
- 9–15 February: 2019 Gold Cup in Bhubaneswar
  - (gold) : Myanmar
  - (silver) : Nepal
  - (bronze) : India
  - 4th: Iran
- 27 February – 2 March: 2019 Aphrodite Women Cup in Cyprus
  - (gold) : Cyprus
  - (silver) : Malta
  - (bronze) : Estonia
  - 4th: Lithuania
- 26 February – 4 March: 2019 Istria Cup in Croatia
  - (gold) : Slovenia
  - (silver) : Serbia
  - (bronze) : Ukraine
  - 4th: Bosnia and Herzegovina
- 27 February – 5 March: 2019 Turkish Women's Cup in Turkey
  - (gold) : France B
  - (silver) : Romania
  - (bronze) : Northern Ireland
  - 4th: Uzbekistan
- 28 February – 6 March: 2019 Cup of Nations in Australia
  - (gold) : Australia
  - (silver) : South Korea
  - (bronze) : New Zealand
  - 4th: Argentina
- 27 February – 6 March: 2019 Cyprus Women's Cup in Cyprus
  - (gold) : North Korea
  - (silver) : Italy
  - (bronze) : Belgium
  - 4th: Austria
- 27 February – 6 March: 2019 Algarve Cup in Portugal
  - (gold) : Norway
  - (silver) : Poland
  - (bronze) : Canada
  - 4th: Sweden
- 27 February – 5 March: 2019 SheBelieves Cup in the United States
  - (gold) : England
  - (silver) : United States
  - (bronze) : Japan
  - 4th: Brazil
- 4–7 April: 2019 Wuhan International Tournament in Wuhan
  - (gold) : China
  - (silver) : Cameroon
  - (bronze) : Russia
  - 4th: Croatia
- 25 April – 4 May: 2019 Bangamata U-19 Women's Gold Cup in Dhaka
  - (gold) : Bangladesh and Laos
- 8–18 May: 2019 Sud Ladies Cup in France
  - (gold) : North Korea
  - (silver) : Japan
  - (bronze) : France
  - 4th: Mexico

== Fixed dates for national team matches ==
Scheduled international matches per their International Match Calendar. Also known as FIFA International Day/Date(s).

- 18–26 March
- 3–11 June
- 2–10 September
- 7–15 October
- 11–19 November

== News ==
In November 2019, FIFA banned referee Ibrahim Chaibou of Niger for life and imposed a heavy fine on him for corrupting and manipulating games he oversaw, including friendlies between South Africa and Guatemala and Nigeria and Argentina in May 2010 and June 2011, respectively.

== Club continental champions ==
=== Men ===
Region	Tournament	Defending champion	Champion	Title	Last honor
AFC (Asia)	2019 AFC Champions League	(Japan) Kashima Antlers	(Saudi Arabia) Al-Hilal	3rd	1999–2000
AFC (Asia)	2019 AFC Cup	(Iraq) Al-Quwa Al-Jawiya	(Lebanon) Al-Ahed	1st	—
CAF (Africa)	2018–19 CAF Champions League	(Tunisia) Espérance de Tunis	(Tunisia) Espérance de Tunis	4th	2018
CAF (Africa)	2018–19 CAF Confederation Cup	(Morocco) Raja Casablanca	(Egypt) Zamalek	1st	—
CAF (Africa)	2019 CAF Super Cup (March)	(Morocco) Wydad Casablanca	(Morocco) Raja Casablanca	2nd	2000
CONCACAF (North and Central America, Caribbean)	2019 CONCACAF Champions League	(Mexico) Guadalajara	(Mexico) Monterrey	4th	2012–13
CONCACAF (North and Central America, Caribbean)	2019 CONCACAF League	(Costa Rica) Herediano	(Costa Rica) Saprissa	1st	—
CONCACAF (North and Central America, Caribbean)	2019 Caribbean Club Championship	(Dominican Republic) Atlético Pantoja	(Jamaica) Portmore United	2nd	2005
CONCACAF (North and Central America, Caribbean)	2019 Caribbean Club Shield	(Martinique) Club Franciscain	(Suriname) Robinhood	1st	—
CONMEBOL (South America)	2019 Copa Libertadores	(Argentina) River Plate	(Brazil) Flamengo	2nd	1981
CONMEBOL (South America)	2019 Copa Sudamericana	(Brazil) Athletico Paranaense	(Ecuador) Independiente del Valle	1st	—
CONMEBOL (South America)	2019 Recopa Sudamericana	(Brazil) Grêmio	(Argentina) River Plate	4th	2016
OFC (Oceania)	2019 OFC Champions League	(New Zealand) Team Wellington	(New Caledonia) Hienghène Sport	1st	—
UEFA (Europe)	2018–19 UEFA Champions League	(Spain) Real Madrid	(England) Liverpool	6th	2004–05
UEFA (Europe)	2018–19 UEFA Europa League	(Spain) Atlético Madrid	(England) Chelsea	2nd	2012–13
UEFA (Europe)	2019 UEFA Super Cup	(Spain) Atlético Madrid	(England) Liverpool	4th	2005
UAFA (Arab States)	2018–19 Arab Club Champions Cup	(Tunisia) Espérance de Tunis	(Tunisia) Étoile du Sahel	1st	—
FIFA (Global)	2019 FIFA Club World Cup	(Spain) Real Madrid	(England) Liverpool	1st	—

=== Women ===
Region	Tournament	Defending champion	Champion	Title	Last honor
AFC (Asia)	2019 AFC Women's Club Championship	None (inaugural event)	(Japan) Nippon TV Beleza	1st	—
AFC (Asia)	2019 WAFF Women's Clubs Championship	None (inaugural event)	(Jordan) Shabab Ordon	1st	—
CONCACAF (North and Central America, Caribbean)	2019 UNCAF Women's Interclub Championship	(Guatemala) Unifut	(Costa Rica) Saprissa	1st	—
CONMEBOL (South America)	2019 Copa Libertadores Femenina	(Colombia) Atlético Huila	(Brazil) Corinthians	1st	—
UEFA (Europe)	2018–19 UEFA Women's Champions League	(France) Lyon	(France) Lyon	6th	2017–18

== Domestic leagues ==
=== UEFA ===
Nation	Tournament	Champion	Second place	Title	Last honor
Albania	2018–19 Albanian Superliga	Partizani	Kukësi	16th	1992–93
Andorra	2018–19 Primera Divisió	Santa Coloma	Sant Julià	13th	2017–18
Armenia	2018–19 Armenian Premier League	Ararat-Armenia	Pyunik	1st	—
Austria	2018–19 Austrian Football Bundesliga	Red Bull Salzburg	LASK	13th	2017–18
Azerbaijan	2018–19 Azerbaijan Premier League	Qarabağ	Neftçi Baku	7th	2017–18
Belarus	2019 Belarusian Premier League	Dynamo Brest	BATE Borisov	1st	–
Belgium	2018–19 Belgian First Division A	Genk	Club Brugge	4th	2010–11
Bosnia and Herzegovina	2018–19 Premier League of Bosnia and Herzegovina	Sarajevo	Zrinjski Mostar	4th	2014–15
Bulgaria	2018–19 Parva Liga	Ludogorets Razgrad	CSKA Sofia	8th	2017–18
Croatia	2018–19 Croatian First Football League	Dinamo Zagreb	Rijeka	20th	2017–18
Cyprus	2018–19 Cypriot First Division	APOEL	AEK Larnaca	28th	2017–18
Czech Republic	2018–19 Czech First League	Slavia Prague	Viktoria Plzeň	18th	2016–17
Denmark	2018–19 Danish Superliga	Copenhagen	Midtjylland	13th	2016–17
England	2018–19 Premier League	Manchester City	Liverpool	6th	2017–18
Estonia	2019 Meistriliiga	Flora	Levadia	12th	2017
Faroe Islands	2019 Effodeildin	KÍ	B36	18th	1999
Finland	2019 Veikkausliiga	KuPS	FC Inter	6th	1976
France	2018–19 Ligue 1	Paris Saint-Germain	Lille	8th	2017–18
(Georgia (country)) Georgia	2019 Erovnuli Liga	Dinamo Tbilisi	Dinamo Batumi	17th	2015–16
Germany	2018–19 Bundesliga	Bayern Munich	Borussia Dortmund	29th	2017–18
Gibraltar	2018–19 Gibraltar Premier Division	Lincoln Red Imps	Europa FC	24th	2017–18
Greece	2018–19 Super League Greece	PAOK	Olympiacos	3rd	1984–85
Hungary	2018–19 Nemzeti Bajnokság I	Ferencváros	MOL Vidi	30th	2015–16
Iceland	2019 Úrvalsdeild	KR	Breiðablik	27th	2013
(Republic of Ireland) Ireland	2019 League of Ireland Premier Division	Dundalk	Shamrock Rovers	14th	2018
Israel	2018–19 Israeli Premier League	Maccabi Tel Aviv	Maccabi Haifa	23rd	2014–15
Italy	2018–19 Serie A	Juventus	Napoli	35th	2017–18
Kazakhstan	2019 Kazakhstan Premier League	Astana	Kairat	6th	2018
Kosovo	2018–19 Football Superleague of Kosovo	Feronikeli	Prishtina	3rd	2015–16
Latvia	2019 Latvian Higher League	Riga	RFS	2nd	2018
Lithuania	2019 A Lyga	Sūduva	Žalgiris	3rd	2018
Luxembourg	2018–19 Luxembourg National Division	F91 Dudelange	Fola Esch	15th	2017–18
Malta	2018–19 Maltese Premier League	Valletta	Hibernians	25th	2017–18
Moldova	2019 Moldovan National Division	Sheriff Tiraspol	Sfântul Gheorghe	18th	2018
Montenegro	2018–19 Montenegrin First League	Sutjeska	Budućnost	4th	2017–18
Netherlands	2018–19 Eredivisie	Ajax	PSV Eindhoven	34th	2013–14
North Macedonia	2018–19 Macedonian First Football League	Shkëndija	Vardar	3rd	2017–18
Northern Ireland	2018–19 NIFL Premiership	Linfield	Ballymena United	53rd	2016–17
Norway	2019 Eliteserien	Molde	Bodø/Glimt	4th	2014
Poland	2018–19 Ekstraklasa	Piast Gliwice	Legia Warsaw	1st	—
Portugal	2018–19 Primeira Liga	Benfica	Porto	37th	2016–17
Romania	2018–19 Liga I	CFR Cluj	FCSB	5th	2017–18
Russia	2018–19 Russian Premier League	Zenit Saint Petersburg	Lokomotiv Moscow	6th	2014–15
San Marino	2018–19 Campionato Sammarinese di Calcio	Tre Penne	La Fiorita	4th	2015–16
Scotland	2018–19 Scottish Premiership	Celtic	Rangers	50th	2017–18
Serbia	2018–19 Serbian SuperLiga	Red Star Belgrade	Radnički Niš	30th	2017–18
Slovakia	2018–19 Slovak First Football League	Slovan Bratislava	DAC Dunajská Streda	9th	2013–14
Slovenia	2018–19 Slovenian PrvaLiga	Maribor	Olimpija Ljubljana	15th	2016–17
Spain	2018–19 La Liga	Barcelona	Atlético Madrid	26th	2017–18
Sweden	2019 Allsvenskan	Djurgårdens IF	Malmö FF	12th	2005
Switzerland	2018–19 Swiss Super League	Young Boys	Basel	13th	2017–18
Turkey	2018–19 Süper Lig	Galatasaray	İstanbul Başakşehir	22nd	2017–18
Ukraine	2018–19 Ukrainian Premier League	Shakhtar Donetsk	Dynamo Kyiv	13th	2017–18
Wales	2018–19 Welsh Premier League	The New Saints	Connah's Quay Nomads	13th	2017–18
(Republic of Crimea (Russia)) Crimea	2018–19 Crimean Premier League	Sevastopol	TSK-Tavria Simferopol	3rd	2016–17

=== AFC ===
Nation	Tournament	Champion	Second place	Title	Last honor
Afghanistan	2019 Afghan Premier League	Toofan Harirod	Shaheen Asmayee	3rd	2018
Australia	2018–19 A-League	Sydney FC	Perth Glory	4th	2016–17
Bahrain	2018–19 Bahraini Premier League	Al-Riffa	Manama	12th	2013–14
Bangladesh	2018–19 Bangladesh Premier League	Bashundhara Kings	Dhaka Abahani Ltd.	1st	—
Bhutan	2019 Bhutan Premier League	Paro	Transport United	1st	—
Brunei	2018-19 Brunei Super League	MS ABDB	Kasuka	4th	2017–18
Cambodia	2019 C-League	Preah Khan Reach Svay Rieng	Visakha	2nd	2013
China	2019 Chinese Super League	Guangzhou Evergrande Taobao	Beijing Sinobo Guoan	8th	2017
Chinese Taipei	2019 Taiwan Football Premier League	Tatung	Taipower	3rd	2018
(North Korea) DPR Korea	2018–19 DPR Korea Premier Football League	April 25	Ryomyong	19th	2017–18
(Timor-Leste) East Timor	2019 Liga Futebol Amadora	Lalenok United	Boavista	1st	—
Guam	2018–19 Guam Soccer League	NAPA Rovers	BOG Strykers	6th	2017–18
Hong Kong	2018–19 Hong Kong Premier League	Tai Po	R&F	1st	—
India	2018–19 Indian Super League	Bengaluru FC	FC Goa	1st	—
India	2018–19 I-League	Chennai City	East Bengal	1st	—
Indonesia	2019 Liga 1	Bali United	Persebaya Surabaya	1st	–
Iran	2018–19 Persian Gulf Pro League	Persepolis	Sepahan	12th	2017–18
Iraq	2018–19 Iraqi Premier League	Al-Shorta	Al-Quwa Al-Jawiya	4th	2012–13
Japan	2019 J1 League	Yokohama F. Marinos	FC Tokyo	4th	2014
Jordan	2018–19 Jordanian Pro League	Al-Faisaly	Al-Jazeera	34th	2016–17
Kuwait	2018–19 Kuwaiti Premier League	Kuwait SC	Qadsia SC	14th	2017–18
Kyrgyzstan	2019 Kyrgyz Premier League	Dordoi Bishkek	Alay Osh	11th	2018
Laos	2019 Lao Premier League	Lao Toyota	Master 7	4th	2018
Lebanon	2018–19 Lebanese Premier League	Ahed	Ansar	7th	2017–18
Macau	2019 Liga de Elite	Chao Pak Kei	Cheng Fung	1st	—
Malaysia	2019 Malaysia Super League	Johor Darul Ta'zim	Pahang FA	6th	2018
Mongolia	2019 Mongolian Premier League	Ulaanbaatar City	Erchim	1st	—
Myanmar	2019 Myanmar National League	Shan United	Ayeyawady United	2nd	2017
Nepal	2018–19 Martyr's Memorial A-Division League	Manang Marshyangdi	Sankata BSC	8th	2013–14
Northern Mariana Islands	2019 M*League Division 1 (Spring)	Teen Ayuyu	The Old B Bank	1st	—
Northern Mariana Islands	2019 M*League Division 1 (Fall)	All Blue (NMI U-19)	Paire	1st	–
Oman	2018–19 Oman Professional League	Dhofar	Al-Nasr	11th	2016–17
Palestine	2018–19 West Bank Premier League	Hilal Al-Quds	Shabab Al-Khalil	4th	2017–18
Pakistan	2018–19 Pakistan Premier League	Khan Research Laboratories	Pakistan Airforce	5th	2013–14
Philippines	2019 Philippines Football League	Ceres–Negros	Kaya–Iloilo	3rd	2018
Qatar	2018–19 Qatar Stars League	Al-Sadd	Al-Duhail	14th	2012–13
Saudi Arabia	2018–19 Saudi Professional League	Al-Nassr	Al-Hilal	8th	2014–15
Singapore	2019 Singapore Premier League	DPMM	Tampines Rovers	2nd	2015
South Korea	2019 K League 1	Jeonbuk Hyundai Motors	Ulsan Hyundai	7th	2018
Sri Lanka	2018–19 Sri Lanka Champions League	Defenders	Colombo	2nd	2008
Syria	2018–19 Syrian Premier League	Al-Jaish	Tishreen	17th	2017–18
Tajikistan	2019 Tajikistan Higher League	Istiklol	Khujand	8th	2018
Thailand	2019 Thai League 1	Chiangrai United	Buriram United	1st	—
United Arab Emirates	2018–19 UAE Pro League	Sharjah	Shabab Al Ahli	6th	1995–96
Vietnam	2019 V.League 1	Hà Nội	TP Hồ Chí Minh	5th	2018

=== CAF ===
Nation	Tournament	Champion	Second place	Title	Last honor
Algeria	2018–19 Algerian Ligue Professionnelle 1	USM Alger	JS Kabylie	8th	2015–16
Angola	2018–19 Girabola	Primeiro de Agosto	Petro de Luanda	13th	2018
Benin	2018–19 Benin Premier League	Buffles du Borgou FC	Béké FC	5th	2017
Botswana	2018–19 Botswana Premier League	Township Rollers	Jwaneng Galaxy	16th	2017–18
Burkina Faso	2018–19 Burkinabé Premier League	Rahimo FC	Salitas FC	1st	—
Burundi	2018–19 Burundi Premier League	Algie Noir	Musongati FC	1st	—
Cameroon	2019 Elite One	UMS de Loum	Coton Sport FC	2nd	2016
Cape Verde	2019 Cape Verdean Football Championships	CS Mindelense	GD Oásis Atlântico	13th	2016
Central African Republic	2019 Central African Republic League	AS Tempête Mocaf	DFC8	12th	2013–14
Chad	2019 LINAFOOT	Elect-Sport FC	AS CotonTchad	6th	2018
Comoros	2019 Comoros Premier League	Fomboni FC	Steal Nouvel	3rd	2014
(Republic of the Congo) Congo	2018–19 Ligue 1	AS Otôho	Étoile du Congo	2nd	2018
(Democratic Republic of the Congo) DR Congo	2018–19 Linafoot	TP Mazembe	AS Vita Club	17th	2016–17
Djibouti	2018–19 Djibouti Premier League	AS Port	Bahache/Université de Djibouti	4th	2011–12
Egypt	2018–19 Egyptian Premier League	Al Ahly	Zamalek	41st	2017–18
Equatorial Guinea	2018–19 Equatoguinean Primera División	Cano Sport	Leones Vegetarianos	1st	—
Eritrea	2019 Eritrean Premier League	Red Sea	Denden	13th	2014
Eswatini	2018–19 Premier League of Eswatini	Green Mamba	Royal Leopards	2nd	2010–11
Ethiopia	2018–19 Ethiopian Premier League	Mekelle City	Sidama Coffee	1st	—
Gabon	2018–19 Gabon Championnat National D1	Cercle Mbéri Sportif	AS Pélican	1st	—
(The Gambia) Gambia	2018–19 GFA League First Division	Brikama United	Real Banjul	2nd	2011
Ghana	2019 Ghanaian Premier League	Asante Kotoko	Karela United	25th	2013–14
Guinea	2018–19 Guinée Championnat National	Horoya AC	Hafia FC	17th	2017–18
Guinea-Bissau	2018–19 Campeonato Nacional da Guiné-Bissau	UD Internacional	Nuno Tristão FC	4th	2002–03
Ivory Coast	2018–19 Ligue 1	SO de l'Armée	FC San Pédro	1st	—
Kenya	2018–19 Kenyan Premier League	Gor Mahia	Bandari	18th	2018
Lesotho	2018–19 Lesotho Premier League	Matlama FC	Bantu FC	10th	2009–10
Liberia	2019 Liberian First Division League	LPRC Oilers	LISCR	6th	2005
Libya	2018–19 Libyan Premier League	Abandoned			
Madagascar	2019 THB Champions League	Fosa Juniors FC	AS Adema	1st	—
Malawi	2019 Malawi Premier Division	Big Bullets	Be Forward Wanderers	14th	2018
Mauritania	2018–19 Ligue 1 Mauritania	FC Nouadhibou	ASAC Concorde	7th	2017–18
Mauritius	2018–19 Mauritian Premier League	Pamplemousses	Roche-Bois Bolton City	6th	2017–18
Morocco	2018–19 Botola	Wydad Casablanca	Raja Casablanca	20th	2016–17
Mozambique	2019 Moçambola	UD Songo	Ferroviário da Beira	3rd	2018
Namibia	2018–19 Namibia Premier League	Black Africa	African Stars	10th	2013–14
Niger	2018–19 Niger Premier League	AS SONIDEP	AS Police	2nd	2017–18
Nigeria	2019 Nigeria Professional Football League	Enyimba	Kano Pillars	8th	2015
Rwanda	2018–19 Rwanda Premier League	Rayon Sports	APR FC	9th	2016–17
São Tomé and Príncipe	2019 São Tomé and Príncipe Championship	Agrosport	Operários	1st	—
Senegal	2018–19 Senegal Premier League	Génération Foot	ASC Diaraf	2nd	2016–17
Seychelles	2019 Seychelles First Division (Mahé)	Northern Dynamo	Saint Louis Saints United	1st	—
Seychelles	2019 Seychelles First Division (Inner-Island)	La Passe	Côte d'Or	5th	2009
Sierra Leone	2019 Sierra Leone National Premier League	East End Lions	Kallon	12th	2009–10
Somalia	2019 Somali First Division	Dekedaha FC	Horseed FC	3rd	2018
South Africa	2018–19 South African Premier Division	Mamelodi Sundowns	Orlando Pirates	9th	2017–18
South Sudan	2019 South Sudan Football Championship	Atlabara	Al-Hilal Wau	3rd	2015
Sudan	2018–19 Sudan Premier League	Al-Merrikh	Al-Hilal	17th	2015
Tanzania	2018–19 Tanzanian Premier League	Simba	Young Africans	20th	2017–18
Togo	2018–19 Togolese Championnat National	ASC Kara de Kara	Maranatha FC	1st	—
Tunisia	2018–19 Tunisian Ligue Professionnelle 1	Espérance de Tunis	Étoile du Sahel	29th	2017–18
Uganda	2018–19 Uganda Premier League	KCCA FC	Vipers	13th	2016–17
Zambia	2019 Zambian Super League	ZESCO United	Green Eagles	8th	2018
Zimbabwe	2019 Zimbabwe Premier Soccer League	Platinum	Chicken Inn	3rd	2018

=== CONCACAF ===
Nation	Tournament	Champion	Second place	Title	Last honor
Anguilla	2019 AFA Senior Male League				
Antigua and Barbuda	2018–19 Antigua and Barbuda Premier Division	Liberta	Hoppers	3rd	1986–87
Aruba	2018–19 Aruban Division di Honor	Racing Club Aruba	Deportivo Nacional	17th	2015–16
Barbados	2018–19 Barbados Premier League	Barbados Defence Force	Weymouth Wales	6th	2015
Belize	2019 Premier League of Belize Closing	San Pedro Pirates	Belmopan Bandits	1st	—
Belize	2019 Premier League of Belize Opening	Verdes	Belmopan Bandits	3nd	2017 Premier League of Belize Opening
Bermuda	2018–19 Bermudian Premier Division	PHC Zebras	Robin Hood	11th	2017–18
Bonaire	2018–19 Bonaire League	Real Rincon	Estrellas	11th	2017–18
British Virgin Islands	2019 BVIFA National Football League				
Canada	2019 Canadian Premier League	Forge FC	Cavalry FC	1st	—
Cayman Islands	2018–19 Cayman Islands Premier League	Scholars International	Bodden Town	12th	2017–18
Costa Rica	2019 Clausura	San Carlos	Saprissa	1st	—
Costa Rica	2019 Apertura	Herediano	Alajuelense	29th	2018 Apertura
Cuba	2019 Campeonato Nacional	Santiago de Cuba	La Habana	3rd	2018
Curaçao	2018–19 Curaçao Promé Divishon	Vesta	Scherpenheuvel	1st	—
Dominica	2018–19 Dominica Premier League	South East	Dublanc	2nd	2007
Dominican Republic	2019 Liga Dominicana de Fútbol Apertura	Atlético Pantoja	Cibao	2nd	2015
Dominican Republic	2019 Liga Dominicana de Fútbol Clausura	Cibao	Atlético San Cristóbal	2nd	2018
El Salvador	2019 Clausura	Santa Tecla	Alianza	4th	2017 Clausura
El Salvador	2019 Apertura	Alianza	FAS	15th	2018 Clausura
Guadeloupe	2018–19 Guadeloupe Division of Honor	Amical Club	Moulien	1st	—
Guatemala	2019 Clausura	Antigua GFC	Malacateco	4th	2017 Apertura
Guatemala	2019 Apertura	Municipal	Antigua GFC	31st	2016 Clausura
Honduras	2019 Clausura	Motagua	Olimpia	17th	2018 Apertura
Honduras	2019 Apertura	Olimpia	Motagua	31st	2016 Clausura
Jamaica	2018–19 National Premier League	Portmore United	Waterhouse	7th	2017–18
Mexico	2019 Liga MX Clausura	Tigres UANL	León	7th	Apertura 2017
Mexico	2019 Liga MX Apertura	Monterrey	América	5th	Apertura 2010
Nicaragua	2019 Clausura	Real Estelí	Managua	15th	2017 Clausura
Nicaragua	2019 Apertura	Real Estelí	Managua	16th	2019 Clausura
Panama	2019 Clausura	Independiente	San Francisco	2nd	2018 Clausura
Panama	2019 Apertura	Tauro	Costa del Este	15th	2018 Apertura
Suriname	2018–19 SVB Topklasse	Inter Moengotapoe	Robinhood	10th	2016–17
Trinidad and Tobago	2019 TT Pro League				
(United States Virgin Islands) U.S. Virgin Islands	2018–19 U.S. Virgin Islands Premier League	Helenites	United We Stand	5th	2014–15
United States & Canada	2019 Major League Soccer season	Seattle Sounders FC	Toronto FC	2nd	2016

=== CONMEBOL ===
Nation	Tournament	Champion	Second place	Title	Last honor
Argentina	2018–19 Argentine Primera División	Racing	Defensa y Justicia	18th	2014
Bolivia	2019 Bolivian Primera División Apertura	Bolívar	The Strongest	29th	2017 Clausura
Bolivia	2019 Bolivian Primera División Clausura	Jorge Wilstermann	The Strongest	15th	2018 Apertura
Brazil	2019 Campeonato Brasileiro Série A	Flamengo	Santos	6th	2009
Chile	2019 Chilean Primera División (Note: Due to the 2019 Chilean protests, the 2019 Chilean Primera División season was declared as concluded on 29 November 2019 with six matchdays remaining.)	Universidad Católica	Colo-Colo	14th	2018
Colombia	2019 Categoría Primera A Apertura	Junior	Deportivo Pasto	9th	2018 Finalización
Colombia	2019 Categoría Primera A Finalización	América de Cali	Junior	14th	2008 Finalización
Ecuador	2019 Campeonato Ecuatoriano de Fútbol Serie A	Delfín	LDU Quito	1st	—
Paraguay	2019 Paraguayan Primera División Apertura	Olimpia	Cerro Porteño	43rd	2018 Clausura
Paraguay	2019 Paraguayan Primera División Clausura	Olimpia	Libertad	44th	2019 Apertura
Peru	2019 Peruvian Liga 1	Binacional	Alianza Lima	1st	—
Uruguay	2019 Uruguayan Primera División	Nacional	Peñarol	47th	2016
Venezuela	2019 Venezuelan Primera División	Caracas	Estudiantes de Mérida	12th	2009–10

=== OFC ===
Nation	Tournament	Champion	Second place	Title	Last honor
Cook Islands	2019 Cook Islands Round Cup	Tupapa Maraerenga	Nikao Sokattak	14th	2018
Fiji	2019 Fiji Premier League	Ba	Lautoka	21st	2016
New Zealand	2018–19 New Zealand Football Championship	Eastern Suburbs	Team Wellington	2nd	1971
Papua New Guinea	2019 PNG National Soccer League	Toti City	Hekari United	5th	2018

== Domestic cups ==
=== AFC ===
Nation	Tournament	Champion	Final score	Second place	Title	Last honor
Australia	2019 FFA Cup	Adelaide United	4–0	Melbourne City	3rd	2018
Bahrain	2018–19 Bahraini King's Cup	Al-Riffa	2–1	Al-Hidd	6th	2010
Bahrain	2018–19 Bahraini FA Cup	East Riffa Club	3–1	Al-Ahli Club	1st	—
China	2019 Chinese FA Cup	Shanghai Greenland Shenhua	3–1	Shandong Luneng Taishan	5th	2017
Indonesia	2018–19 Piala Indonesia	PSM Makassar	2–1 (agg.)	Persija Jakarta	1st	–
Iran	2018–19 Hazfi Cup	Persepolis	1–0	Damash	6th	2010–11
Japan	2019 Emperor's Cup (Note: The Emperor's Cup final is traditionally held on 1 January of the next calendar year.)	Vissel Kobe	2–0	Kashima Antlers	1st	–
Japan	2019 J.League Cup	Kawasaki Frontale	3–3 (5–4 p)	Consadole Sapporo	1st	–
Jordan	2018–19 Jordan FA Cup	Al-Faisaly	2–0	Al-Ramtha	20th	2016–17
Kuwait	2018–19 Kuwait Emir Cup	Kuwait SC	2–0	Qadsia SC	14th	2017–18
Kuwait	2018–19 Kuwait Crown Prince Cup	Kuwait SC	1–0	Qadsia SC	7th	2016–17
Lebanon	2018–19 Lebanese FA Cup	Ahed	1–0	Ansar	6th	2017–18
Lebanon	2019 Lebanese Elite Cup	Shabab Sahel	3–3 (5–3 p)	Ansar	1st	–
Lebanon	2019 Lebanese Challenge Cup	Bourj	2–0	Salam Zgharta	1st	–
Malaysia	2019 Piala Sumbangsih	Johor Darul Ta'zim	1–0	Perak FA	4th	2018
Malaysia	2019 Malaysia FA Cup	Kedah FA	1–0	Perak FA	5th	2017
Malaysia	2019 Malaysia Cup	Johor Darul Ta'zim FC	3–0	Kedah FA	2nd	2017
Malaysia	2019 Malaysia Challenge Cup	Johor Darul Ta'zim II F.C.	1–1 (6–5 p)	UKM F.C.	1st	–
Oman	2018–19 Sultan Qaboos Cup	Sur Club	2–1 (a.e.t.)	Fanja Club	4th	2007
Philippines	2019 Copa Paulino Alcantara	Ceres–Negros	2–1	Kaya–Iloilo	1st	–
Qatar	2019 Emir of Qatar Cup	Al-Duhail	4–1	Al-Sadd	3rd	2018
Saudi Arabia	2019 King Cup	Al-Taawoun	2–1	Al-Ittihad Club	1st	—
Singapore	2019 Singapore Cup	Tampines Rovers	4–3	Warriors	4th	2016 Singapore Cup
South Korea	2019 Korean FA Cup	Suwon Samsung Bluewings	4–0	Daejeon Korail FC	5th	2016 Korean FA Cup
United Arab Emirates	2018–19 UAE President's Cup	Shabab Al Ahli	2–1	Al Dhafra	13th	2012–13
United Arab Emirates	2018–19 UAE League Cup	Shabab Al Ahli	3–1 (a.e.t.)	Al Wahda	5th	2016–17

=== UEFA ===
Nation	Tournament	Champion	Final score	Second place	Title	Last honor
Albania	2018–19 Albanian Cup	Kukësi	2–1	Tirana	2nd	2015–16
Andorra	2019 Copa Constitució	Engordany	2–0	FC Santa Coloma	1st	—
Armenia	2018–19 Armenian Cup	Alashkert	1–0	Lori	1st	—
Austria	2018–19 Austrian Cup	Red Bull Salzburg	2–0	Rapid Wien	6th	2016–17
Azerbaijan	2018–19 Azerbaijan Cup	Gabala	1–0	Sumgayit	1st	—
Belarus	2018–19 Belarusian Cup	Shakhtyor Soligorsk	2–0	Vitebsk	3rd	2013–14
Belgium	2018–19 Belgian Cup	Mechelen	2–1	Gent	2nd	1986–87
Bosnia and Herzegovina	2018–19 Bosnia and Herzegovina Cup	Sarajevo	3–1	Široki Brijeg	6th	2013–14
Bulgaria	2018–19 Bulgarian Cup	Lokomotiv Plovdiv	1–0	Botev Plovdiv	1st	—
Croatia	2018–19 Croatian Football Cup	Rijeka	3–1	Dinamo Zagreb	5th	2016–17
Cyprus	2018–19 Cypriot Cup	AEL Limassol	2–0	APOEL	7th	1988–89
Czech Republic	2018–19 Czech Cup	Slavia Prague	2–0	Baník Ostrava	9th	2017–18
Denmark	2018–19 Danish Cup	Midtjylland	1–1 (4–3 p)	Brøndby	1st	—
England	2018–19 FA Cup	Manchester City	6–0	Watford	6th	2010–11
England	2018–19 EFL Cup	Manchester City	0–0 (4–3 p)	Chelsea	6th	2017–18
Estonia	2018–19 Estonian Cup	Narva Trans	2–1 (a.e.t.)	Nõmme Kalju	2nd	2000–01
Faroe Islands	2019 Faroe Islands Cup	Havnar Bóltfelag	3–1	Víkingur Gøta	27th	2004
Finland	2019 Finnish Cup	Ilves	2–0	IFK Mariehamn	3rd	1990
France	2018–19 Coupe de France	Rennes	2–2 (6–5 p)	Paris Saint-Germain	3rd	1970–71
France	2018–19 Coupe de la Ligue	Strasbourg	0–0 (4–1 p)	Guingamp	4th	2004–05
(Georgia (country)) Georgia	2019 Georgian Cup	Saburtalo Tbilisi	3–1	Locomotive Tbilisi	1st	–
Germany	2018–19 DFB-Pokal	Bayern Munich	3–0	RB Leipzig	19th	2015–16
Gibraltar	2019 Rock Cup	Europa	3–0	Gibraltar United	8th	2017–18
Greece	2018–19 Greek Football Cup	PAOK	1–0	AEK Athens	7th	2017–18
Hungary	2018–19 Magyar Kupa	MOL Vidi	2–1	Budapest Honvéd	2nd	2005–06
Iceland	2019 Icelandic Cup	Víkingur R.	1–0	FH	2nd	1971
Iceland	2019 Icelandic League Cup	KR	2–1	ÍA	8th	2017 Icelandic League Cup
Israel	2018–19 Israel State Cup	Bnei Yehuda	1–1 (5–4 p)	Maccabi Netanya	4th	2016–17
Israel	2018–19 Toto Cup Al	Maccabi Tel Aviv	2–1	Maccabi Haifa	6th	2017–18
Italy	2018–19 Coppa Italia	Lazio	2–0	Atalanta	7th	2012–13
Kazakhstan	2019 Kazakhstan Cup	Kaisar	2–1 (a.e.t.)	Atyrau	2nd	1998
Kosovo	2018–19 Kosovar Cup	Feronikeli	5–1	Trepça'89	3rd	2014–15
Latvia	2019 Latvian Football Cup	RFS	3–2 (a.e.t.)	Jelgava	1st	–
Latvia	2019 Virsligas Cup					
Liechtenstein	2018–19 Liechtenstein Cup	FC Vaduz	3–2	FC Ruggell	47th	2017–18
Lithuania	2019 Lithuanian Football Cup	Sūduva	4–0	Banga	3rd	2008–09
Luxembourg	2018–19 Luxembourg Cup	F91 Dudelange	5–0	Etzella Ettelbruck	8th	2016–17
Malta	2018–19 Maltese FA Trophy	Balzan	4–4 (5–4 p)	Valletta	1st	—
Moldova	2018–19 Moldovan Cup	Sheriff Tiraspol	1–0 (a.e.t.)	Sfântul Gheorghe	10th	2016–17
Montenegro	2018–19 Montenegrin Cup	Budućnost	4–0	Lovćen	2nd	2012–13
Netherlands	2018–19 KNVB Cup	Ajax	4–0	Willem II	19th	2009–10
North Macedonia	2018–19 Macedonian Football Cup	Akademija Pandev	2–2 (4–2 p)	Makedonija GP	1st	—
Northern Ireland	2018–19 Irish Cup	Crusaders	3–0	Ballinamallard United	4th	2008–09
Northern Ireland	2018–19 NIFL Cup	Linfield	1–0	Ballymena United	10th	2007–08
Norway	2019 Norwegian Football Cup	Viking	1–0	Haugesund	6th	2001
Poland	2018–19 Polish Cup	Lechia Gdańsk	1–0	Jagiellonia Białystok	2nd	1982–83
Portugal	2018–19 Taça de Portugal	Sporting CP	2–2 (5–4 p)	Porto	17th	2014–15
Portugal	2018–19 Taça da Liga	Sporting CP	1–1 (3–1 p)	Porto	2nd	2017–18
Republic of Ireland	2019 FAI Cup	Shamrock Rovers	1–1 (4–2 p)	Dundalk	25th	1986–87
Republic of Ireland	2019 League of Ireland Cup	Dundalk	2–2 (6–5 p)	Derry City	7th	2017
Romania	2018–19 Cupa României	Viitorul Constanța	2–1 (a.e.t.)	Astra Giurgiu	1st	—
Russia	2018–19 Russian Cup	Lokomotiv Moscow	1–0	Ural Yekaterinburg	10th	2016–17
San Marino	2018–19 Coppa Titano	Tre Fiori	1–0	Folgore	7th	2009–10
Scotland	2018–19 Scottish Cup	Celtic	2–1	Heart of Midlothian	39th	2017–18
Scotland	2018–19 Scottish League Cup (Note: The Scottish League Cup final was actually held on 2 December 2018.)	Celtic	1–0	Aberdeen	18th	2017–18
Serbia	2018–19 Serbian Cup	Partizan	1–0	Red Star Belgrade	7th	2017–18
Slovakia	2018–19 Slovak Cup	Spartak Trnava	3–3 (4–1 p)	Žilina	6th	1997–98
Slovenia	2018–19 Slovenian Cup	Olimpija Ljubljana	2–1	Maribor	2nd	2017–18
Spain	2018–19 Copa del Rey	Valencia	2–1	Barcelona	8th	2007–08
Sweden	2018–19 Svenska Cupen	BK Häcken	3–0	AFC Eskilstuna	2nd	2015–16
Switzerland	2018–19 Swiss Cup	Basel	2–1	Thun	13th	2016–17
Turkey	2018–19 Turkish Cup	Galatasaray	3–1	Akhisarspor	18th	2015–16
Ukraine	2018–19 Ukrainian Cup	Shakhtar Donetsk	4–0	Inhulets Petrove	13th	2017–18
Wales	2018–19 Welsh Cup	The New Saints	3–0	Connah's Quay Nomads	7th	2015–16
Wales	2018–19 Welsh League Cup	Cardiff MU	2–0	Cambrian & Clydach Vale	1st	—

=== CAF ===
Nation	Tournament	Champion	Final score	Second place	Title	Last honor
Angola	2019 Angola Super Cup	Primeiro de Agosto	3–0	Desportivo da Huíla	9th	2017
Algeria	2018–19 Algerian Cup	CR Belouizdad	2–0	JSM Béjaïa	8th	2016–17
Botswana	2018–19 Mascom Top 8 Cup	Jwaneng Galaxy	2–0	Gaborone United	2nd	2016–17
Egypt	2018–19 Egypt Cup	Zamalek	3–0	Pyramids	27th	2017–18
Morocco	2019 Moroccan Throne Cup	TAS de Casablanca	2–1	Hassania Agadir	1st	–
South Africa	2018–19 Nedbank Cup	TS Galaxy	1–0	Kaizer Chiefs	1st	—
Rwanda	2019 Heroes Cup	APR FC	Round Robin	A.S. Kigali	9th	2014
Tunisia	2018–19 Tunisian Cup	CS Sfaxien	0–0 (5–4 p)	Étoile du Sahel	5th	2008–09

=== CONCACAF ===
Nation	Tournament	Champion	Final score	Second place	Title	Last honor
Canada	2019 Canadian Championship	Montreal Impact	1–1 (3–1 p)	Toronto FC	4th	2014
El Salvador	2018–19 Copa El Salvador	Santa Tecla	1–0	Audaz	2nd	2016–17
Honduras	2019 Honduran Cup					
Mexico	Clausura 2019 Copa MX	América	1–0	Juárez	6th	1973–74
United States	2019 Lamar Hunt U.S. Open Cup	Atlanta United FC	2–1	Minnesota United FC	1st	—

=== CONMEBOL ===
Nation	Tournament	Champion	Final score	Second place	Title	Last honor
Argentina	2018–19 Copa Argentina	River Plate	3–0	Central Córdoba (SdE)	3rd	2016–17
Argentina	2019 Copa de la Superliga	Tigre	2–0	Boca Juniors	1st	—
Brazil	2019 Copa do Brasil	Athletico Paranaense	3–1	Internacional	1st	—
Chile	2019 Copa Chile (Note: The 2019 Copa Chile semi-finals and final were played in January 2020.)	Colo-Colo	2–1	Universidad de Chile	12th	2016
Colombia	2019 Copa Colombia	Independiente Medellín	4–3	Deportivo Cali	2nd	1981
Colombia	2019 Superliga Colombiana	Junior	2–2 (3–0 p)	Deportes Tolima	1st	—
Ecuador	2019 Copa Ecuador	LDU Quito	3–3 (a)	Delfín	1st	—
Paraguay	2019 Copa Paraguay	Libertad	3–0	Guaraní	1st	—
Peru	2019 Copa Bicentenario	Atlético Grau	0–0 (4–3 p)	Sport Huancayo	1st	—
Uruguay	2019 Supercopa Uruguaya	Nacional	1–1 (4–3 p)	Peñarol	1st	—
Venezuela	2019 Copa Venezuela	Zamora	3–3 (a)	Monagas	1st	—

=== OFC ===
Nation	Tournament	Champion	Final score	Second place	Title	Last honor
New Zealand	2019 Chatham Cup	Napier City Rovers	3–2	Melville United	5th	2002

== Women's leagues ==
=== UEFA ===
Nation	Tournament	Champion	Second place	Title	Last honor
Albania	2018–19 Albanian Women's National Championship	Vllaznia	Tirana AS	6th	2017–18
Austria	2018–19 ÖFB-Frauenliga	SKN St. Pölten	Sturm Graz	5th	2017–18
Belgium	2018–19 Super League	Anderlecht	K.A.A. Gent	2nd	2017–18
Croatia	2018–19 Croatian Women's First Football League	Split	Osijek	1st	—
Cyprus	2018–19 Cypriot First Division	Apollon Limassol	Barcelona FA	7th	2016-17
Czech Republic	2018–19 Czech First Division	Sparta Prague	Slavia Prague	20th	2017–18
Denmark	2018–19 Elitedivisionen	Brøndby	Fortuna Hjørring	12th	2016–17
England	2018–19 FA WSL	Arsenal	Manchester City	3rd	2012
Faroe Islands	2019 1. deild kvinnur	Klaksvíkar Ítróttarfelag	Havnar Bóltfelag	19th	2016
France	2018–19 Division 1 Féminine	Lyon	Paris Saint-Germain	17th	2017–18
Germany	2018–19 Frauen-Bundesliga	VfL Wolfsburg	Bayern Munich	5th	2017–18
Iceland	2019 Úrvalsdeild	Valur	Breiðablik	11th	2010
(Republic of Ireland) Ireland	2019 Women's National League	Peamount United F.C.	Shelbourne Ladies F.C.	2nd	2011–12
Israel	2018–19 Ligat Nashim	ASA Tel Aviv University	Kiryat Gat	8th	2014–15
Italy	2018–19 Serie A	Juventus	Fiorentina	2nd	2017–18
Netherlands	2018–19 Eredivisie	Twente	Ajax	6th	2015–16
Norway	2019 Toppserien	LSK Kvinner	Vålerenga	7th	2018
Portugal	2018–19 Campeonato Nacional	Braga	Sporting Lisbon	1st	—
Romania	2018–19 Liga I	Olimpia Cluj	Fortuna Becicherecu Mic	5th	2017–18
Russia	2019 Championship	ZFK CSKA Moscow	WFC Lokomotiv Moscow	1st	
Scotland	2019 SWPL 1	Glasgow City	Hibernian	14th	2018
Slovenia	2018–19 Slovenian Women's League	Pomurje	Olimpija Ljubljana	7th	2015–16
Spain	2018–19 Primera División	Atlético Madrid	Barcelona	4th	2017–18
Sweden	2019 Damallsvenskan	Rosengård	Kopparbergs/Göteborg	11th (Note: Includes titles won under previous club identities of Malmö FF Dam and LdB FC Malmö.)	2015
Turkey	2018–19 Turkish Women's First Football League	Beşiktaş	ALG Spor	1st	—
Ukraine	2018–19 Ukrainian Women's League	Zhytlobud-1 Kharkiv	Zhytlobud-2 Kharkiv	9th	2017–18
Wales	2018–19 Welsh Premier League	Cardiff Met Women	Swansea City Ladies	6th (Note: Includes titles won under previous club identities of UWIC Ladies and Cardiff Met Ladies.)	2017–18

=== AFC ===
Nation	Tournament	Champion	Second place	Title	Last honor
Australia	2018–19 W-League	Sydney FC	Perth Glory	3rd	2012–13
Japan	2019 Nadeshiko League Division 1	Nippon TV Beleza	Urawa Reds	17th	2018
Lebanon	2018–19 Lebanese Women's Football League	SAS	Zouk Mosbeh	3rd	2016–17
India	2018–19 Indian Women's Super League	Sethu FC	Manipur Police	1st	None
Indonesia	2019 Liga 1 Putri	Persib Putri	TIRA-Persikabo Kartini	1st	None

=== CONCACAF ===
Nation	Tournament	Champion	Second place	Title	Last honor
Mexico	2019 Liga MX Femenil Clausura	Tigres UANL	Monterrey	2nd	2018 Clausura
Mexico	2019 Liga MX Femenil Apertura	Monterrey	Tigres UANL	1st	None
United States	2019 NWSL	North Carolina Courage	Chicago Red Stars	2nd	2018

=== CONMEBOL ===
Nation	Tournament	Champion	Second place	Title	Last honor
Brazil	2019 Campeonato Brasileiro de Futebol Feminino Série A1	Ferroviária	Corinthians	2nd	2014

=== OFC ===
Nation	Tournament	Champion	Second place	Title	Last honor
New Zealand	2019 National Women's League	Canterbury United Pride	Northern Lights	4th	2016

== Women's cups ==
=== UEFA ===
Nation	Tournament	Champion	Final score	Second place	Title	Last honor
England	2018–19 FA Women's Cup	Manchester City	3–0	West Ham United	2nd	2016–17
England	2018–19 Women's League Cup	Manchester City	0–0 (4–2 p)	Arsenal	3rd	2016
France	2018–19 Coupe de France Féminine	Lyon	3–1	Lille	10th	2017
Germany	2018–19 DFB-Pokal (women)	VfL Wolfsburg	1–0	SC Freiburg	6th	2017–18
Italy	2018–19 Italian Women's Cup	Juventus	2–1	Fiorentina	1st	—
Moldova	2018–19 Moldovan Women's Cup	Agarista-ȘS Anenii Noi	3–1	Noroc Minoreni		
Netherlands	2018–19 KNVB Women's Cup	Ajax	2–1	Zwolle	3rd	2017–18
Portugal	2018–19 Taça de Portugal de Futebol Feminino	Benfica	4–0	Valadares Gaia	1st	
Slovenia	2018–19 Slovenian Women's Cup	Pomurje	5–0	Krim	9th	2017–18
Spain	2018–19 Copa de la Reina	Real Sociedad	2–1	Atlético Madrid	1st	—
Ukraine	2018–19 Ukrainian Women's Cup	WFC Zhytlobud-1 Kharkiv	2–0	Voshkod	11th	2017-18
Wales	2018–19 FAW Women's Cup	Cardiff Met Women	2–0	Abergavenny Women	3rd (Note: Includes titles won under previous club identity of Cardiff Met Ladies.)	2016–17

=== AFC ===
Nation	Tournament	Champion	Final score	Second place	Title	Last honor
Lebanon	2018–19 Lebanese Women's FA Cup	SAS	1–0	Zouk Mosbeh	2nd	2014–15

=== OFC ===
Nation	Tournament	Champion	Final score	Second place	Title	Last honor
New Zealand	2019 Kate Sheppard Cup	Eastern Suburbs	4–0	Coastal Spirit	1st	—

== Second, third, fourth, and fifth leagues ==
=== CONCACAF ===
Nation	League	Champion	Final score	Second place	Title	Last honour
Canada	2019 Première Ligue de soccer du Québec	A.S. Blainville		CS Mont-Royal Outremont	3rd	2018
Canada	2019 Canadian Soccer League	Scarborough SC	2–0	FC Ukraine United	1st	

== Detailed association football results ==
=== FIFA ===
- May 23 – June 15: 2019 FIFA U-20 World Cup in Poland
  - Ukraine defeated South Korea 3–1 to win their first FIFA U-20 World Cup title.
  - Ecuador took third place.
- June 7 – July 7: 2019 FIFA Women's World Cup in France
  - The United States defeated the Netherlands 2–0 to win their second consecutive and fourth overall FIFA Women's World Cup title.
  - Sweden took third place.
- October 26 – November 17: 2019 FIFA U-17 World Cup in Brazil
  - Brazil defeated Mexico 2–1 to win their fourth FIFA U-17 World Cup title.
  - France took third place.
- December 11 – 22: 2019 FIFA Club World Cup in Qatar
  - (England) Liverpool defeated (Brazil) Flamengo, 1–0 in extra time, to win their first FIFA Club World Cup title.
  - (Mexico) Monterrey took third place.

=== UEFA ===
National teams

- May 3 – 19: 2019 UEFA European Under-17 Championship in Ireland
  - The Netherlands defeated Italy, 4–2, to win their second consecutive and fourth overall UEFA European Under-17 Championship title.
- May 5 – 17: 2019 UEFA Women's Under-17 Championship in Bulgaria
  - Germany defeated the Netherlands, 3–2 in penalties and after a 1–1 score in regular play, to win their seventh UEFA Women's Under-17 Championship title.
- June 5 – 9: 2019 UEFA Nations League Finals in Portugal
  - Portugal defeated the Netherlands, 1–0, to win the inaugural UEFA Nations League title.
  - England took third place.
- June 16 – 30: 2019 UEFA European Under-21 Championship in Italy & San Marino
  - Spain defeated Germany, 2–1, to win their fifth UEFA European Under-21 Championship title.
  - Romania and France were the semi-final losers in this tournament.
  - Note: All teams mentioned above have qualified to compete at the 2020 Summer Olympics.
- July 14 – 27: 2019 UEFA European Under-19 Championship in Armenia
  - Spain defeated Portugal, 2–0, to win their 11th UEFA European Under-19 Championship title.
- July 16 – 28: 2019 UEFA Women's Under-19 Championship in Scotland
  - France defeated Germany, 2–1, to win their fifth UEFA Women's Under-19 Championship title.
  - Note: Both teams mentioned above, along with Spain & the Netherlands, have qualified to compete at the 2020 FIFA U-20 Women's World Cup.

Clubs

- September 12, 2018 – May 18, 2019: 2018–19 UEFA Women's Champions League (final in (Hungary) Budapest)
  - (France) Lyon defeated (Spain) Barcelona 4–1 to win their fourth consecutive and sixth overall UEFA Women's Champions League title.
- September 18, 2018 – April 29, 2019: 2018–19 UEFA Youth League (final in (Switzerland) Nyon)
  - (Portugal) Porto defeated (England) Chelsea 3–1 to win their first UEFA Youth League title.
- September 18, 2018 – June 1, 2019: 2018–19 UEFA Champions League (final in (Spain) Madrid)
  - (England) Liverpool defeated fellow English team Tottenham Hotspur 2–0 to win their sixth UEFA Champions League title.
  - Note: Liverpool would represent UEFA at the 2019 FIFA Club World Cup.
- September 20, 2018 – May 29, 2019: 2018–19 UEFA Europa League (final in (Azerbaijan) Baku)
  - (England) Chelsea defeated fellow London side Arsenal 4–1 to win their second UEFA Europa League title.
- August 14: 2019 UEFA Super Cup in (Turkey) Istanbul
  - (England) Liverpool defeated fellow English team Chelsea 5–4 on penalties after extra time ended in a 2–2 draw, winning their fourth UEFA Super Cup title.

=== CONMEBOL ===
National teams

- January 17 – February 10: 2019 South American U-20 Championship in Chile
  - Champions: Ecuador; Second: Argentina; Third: Uruguay; Fourth: Colombia
  - Note 1: All four teams mentioned above have qualified to compete at the 2019 FIFA U-20 World Cup.
  - Note 2: Along with Peru, three teams mentioned above (excluding Colombia) have qualified to compete at the 2019 Pan American Games.
- March 21 – April 14: 2019 South American U-17 Championship in Peru
  - Champions: Argentina; Second: Chile; Third: Paraguay; Fourth: Ecuador
  - Note: All four teams mentioned above have qualified to compete at the 2019 FIFA U-17 World Cup.
- June 14 – July 7: 2019 Copa América in Brazil
  - Brazil defeated Peru, 3–1, to win their ninth Copa América title.
  - Argentina took third place.
- November 23 – December 8: 2019 South American U-15 Championship in Paraguay
  - Champions: Brazil; Second: Argentina; Third: Paraguay; Fourth: Colombia

Clubs

- January 22 – November 23: 2019 Copa Libertadores (final in (Peru) Lima)
  - (Brazil) Flamengo defeated (Argentina) River Plate, 2–1, to win their second Copa Libertadores title.
  - Note: Flamengo would represent CONMEBOL at the 2019 FIFA Club World Cup.
- February 5 – November 9: 2019 Copa Sudamericana (final in (Paraguay) Asunción)
  - (Ecuador) Independiente del Valle defeated (Argentina) Colón, 3–1, to win their first Copa Sudamericana title.
- May 22 & 30: 2019 Recopa Sudamericana (Matches played in (Brazil) Curitiba & (Argentina) Buenos Aires)
  - (Argentina) River Plate defeated (Brazil) Athletico Paranaense, 3–1, to win their third Recopa Sudamericana title.
- August 7: 2019 J.League Cup / Copa Sudamericana Championship in (Japan) Hiratsuka
  - (Brazil) Club Athletico Paranaense defeated (Japan) Shonan Bellmare, 4–0, to win their first J.League Cup / Copa Sudamericana Championship title.
- October 11 – 28: 2019 Copa Libertadores Femenina in (Ecuador) Quito
  - (Brazil) Corinthians defeated fellow Brazilian team, Ferroviária, 2–0, to win their first Copa Libertadores Femenina title.
  - (Colombia) América took third place.

=== AFC ===
National teams

- January 5 – February 1: 2019 AFC Asian Cup in the United Arab Emirates
  - Qatar defeated Japan, 3–1, to win their first AFC Asian Cup title.
- September 15 – 28: 2019 AFC U-16 Women's Championship in Thailand
  - Japan defeated North Korea, 2–1, to win their fourth AFC U-16 Women's Championship title.
  - China took third place.
  - Note: Both Japan and North Korea have qualified to compete at the 2020 FIFA U-17 Women's World Cup.
- October 27 – November 9: 2019 AFC U-19 Women's Championship in Thailand
  - Japan defeated North Korea, 2–1, to win their third consecutive and sixth overall AFC U-19 Women's Championship title.
  - South Korea took third place.
  - Note: All three teams mentioned above have qualified to compete at the 2020 FIFA U-20 Women's World Cup.

Clubs

- February 5 – November 4: 2019 AFC Cup
  - (Lebanon) Al Ahed FC defeated (North Korea) April 25, 1–0, to win their first AFC Cup title.
- February 5 – November 24: 2019 AFC Champions League
  - (Saudi Arabia) Al-Hilal defeated (Japan) Urawa Red Diamonds, 3–0 on aggregate, to win their third AFC Champions League title.
  - Note: Al-Hilal would represent the AFC at the 2019 FIFA Club World Cup.

=== AFF ===
- February 17 – 26: 2019 AFF U-22 Youth Championship in Phnom Penh
  - In the final, Indonesia defeated Thailand, 2–1. to win their 1st title.
  - Vietnam took third place and Cambodia took fourth place.

=== WAFF ===
- January 7 – 15: 2019 WAFF Women's Championship in Muharraq
  - Round Robin final positions: 1. Jordan, 2. Bahrain, 3. Lebanon, 4. United Arab Emirates, 5. Palestine

=== SAFF ===
- March 12 – 22: 2019 SAFF Women's Championship in Nepal
  - In the final, India defeated Nepal, 3–1, to win their 5th consecutive SAFF Women's Championship.
  - Sri Lanka and Bangladesh shared semifinals.

=== UAFA ===
- May 5, 2018 – April 28: 2018–19 Arab Club Champions Cup
  - (Tunisia) Étoile du Sahel defeated (Saudi Arabia) Al-Hilal FC, 2–1, to win their first Arab Club Champions Cup title.

=== CAF ===
National teams

- February 2 – 17: 2019 Africa U-20 Cup of Nations in (Niger) Niamey & Maradi
  - Mali defeated Senegal, 3–2 in penalties and after a 1–1 score in regular play, to win their first Africa U-20 Cup of Nations title.
  - South Africa took third place. Nigeria took fourth place.
  - Note: All teams mentioned above have qualified to compete at the 2019 FIFA U-20 World Cup.
- April 14 – 28: 2019 Africa U-17 Cup of Nations in (Tanzania) Dar es Salaam
  - Cameroon defeated Guinea, 5–3 in penalties and after a 0–0 score in regular play, to win their second Africa U-17 Cup of Nations title.
  - Angola took third place. Nigeria took fourth place.
  - Note: All four teams mentioned above have qualified to compete at the 2019 FIFA U-17 World Cup.
- June 21 – July 19: 2019 Africa Cup of Nations in Egypt
  - Algeria defeated Senegal, 1–0, to win their second Africa Cup of Nations title.
  - Nigeria took third place.
- November 8 – 22: 2019 Africa U-23 Cup of Nations in Cairo
  - Champions: Egypt; Second: Ivory Coast; Third: South Africa; Fourth: Ghana;

Clubs

- November 27, 2018 – May 26, 2019: 2018–19 CAF Confederation Cup
  - (Egypt) Zamalek SC defeated (Morocco) RS Berkane, 5–3 in penalties after a 1–1 score in regular play, to win their first CAF Confederation Cup title.
- November 27, 2018 – May 31: 2018–19 CAF Champions League
  - (Tunisia) Espérance de Tunis defeated (Morocco) Wydad Casablanca, after the Moroccan team forfeited the second and final match between these teams. Therefore, Espérance de Tunis won their second consecutive and fourth overall CAF Champions League title.
  - Note: Espérance de Tunis would represent the CAF at the 2019 FIFA Club World Cup.
- March 29: 2019 CAF Super Cup (March) in (Qatar) Al Rayyan
  - (Morocco) Raja Casablanca defeated (Tunisia) Espérance de Tunis, 2–1, to win their second CAF Super Cup title.

=== CONCACAF ===
National teams

- May 1 – 16: 2019 CONCACAF U-17 Championship in Bradenton
  - Mexico defeated the United States, 2–1 in extra time, to win their eighth CONCACAF U-17 Championship title.
- June 15 – July 7: 2019 CONCACAF Gold Cup in the United States, (Costa Rica) San José, and (Jamaica) Kingston
  - Mexico defeated the United States, 1–0, to win their eighth CONCACAF Gold Cup title.

Clubs

- February 19 – May 2: 2019 CONCACAF Champions League
  - (Mexico) Monterrey defeated fellow Mexican team, UANL, 2–1 on aggregate, to win their fourth CONCACAF Champions League title.
  - Note: Monterrey would represent CONCACAF at the 2019 FIFA Club World Cup.
- July 30 – November 26: 2019 CONCACAF League
  - (Costa Rica) Saprissa defeated (Honduras) Motagua, 1–0 on aggregate, to win their first CONCACAF League title.

=== OFC ===
National teams

- August 30 – September 12: 2019 OFC U-19 Women's Championship in (Cook Islands) Matavera
  - New Zealand defeated New Caledonia, 5–2, to win their seventh consecutive OFC U-19 Women's Championship title.
  - Tahiti took third place.
  - Note: New Zealand has qualified to compete at the 2020 FIFA U-20 Women's World Cup.
- September 21 – October 6: 2019 OFC Men's Olympic Qualifying Tournament (also named the 2019 OFC U-23 Championship) in Fiji
  - New Zealand defeated the Solomon Islands, 5–0, to win their fourth 2019 OFC U-23 Championship title.
  - Vanuatu took third place.
  - Note: New Zealand has qualified to compete at the 2020 Summer Olympics.

Clubs

- February 10 – May 12: 2019 OFC Champions League
  - (New Caledonia) Hienghène Sport defeated fellow New Caledonian team, Magenta, 1–0, to win their first OFC Champions League title.
  - Note: Hienghène Sport would represent CONCACAF at the 2019 FIFA Club World Cup.

== Detailed beach soccer results ==
=== International beach soccer events ===
- March 9 – 17: 2019 AFC Beach Soccer Championship in (Thailand) Pattaya
  - Japan defeated United Arab Emirates, 3–1 in penalties and after a 2–2 score in regular play, to win their third AFC Beach Soccer Championship title.
  - Oman took third place.
  - Note: These three teams have qualified to compete at the 2019 FIFA Beach Soccer World Cup.
- April 28 – May 5: 2019 CONMEBOL Qualifier for the FIFA Beach Soccer World Cup in Brazil
  - Brazil defeated Uruguay, 10–1, in the final.
  - Paraguay took third place.
  - Note 1: Both Brazil and Uruguay have qualified to compete at the 2019 FIFA Beach Soccer World Cup.
  - Note 2: Paraguay has already qualified for the 2019 FIFA Beach Soccer World Cup as host nation.
- May 9 – 12: 2019 World Beach Games - European Qualifier in Tarragona
  - Men: 1. Russia, 2. Spain, 3. Italy, 4. Switzerland
  - Note 1: All men's teams mentioned above have qualified to compete at the 2019 World Beach Games.
  - Women: 1. England, 2. Spain, 3. Switzerland, 4. Russia, 5. Czech Republic
  - Note 2: England and Spain (women's teams) have qualified to compete at the 2019 World Beach Games.
- May 13 – 19: 2019 CONCACAF Beach Soccer Championship in Puerto Vallarta
  - Mexico defeated the United States, 6–2, to win their fourth CONCACAF Beach Soccer Championship title.
  - El Salvador took third place.
  - Note: Both Mexico and the United States qualify to compete at the 2019 FIFA Beach Soccer World Cup.
- June 17 – 22: 2019 OFC Beach Soccer Nations Cup in (French Polynesia) Papeete
  - Tahiti defeated the Solomon Islands, 4–3, to win their second OFC Beach Soccer Nations Cup title.
  - New Caledonia took third place.
  - Note: Tahiti has qualified to compete at the 2019 FIFA Beach Soccer World Cup.
- June 19 – 23: Part of the 2019 African Beach Games in (Cape Verde) Sal (debut event)
  - Senegal defeated Morocco, 4–1, to win the inaugural African Beach Games gold medal.
  - Nigeria took the bronze medal.
- June 25 – 29: Part of the 2019 European Games in (Belarus) Minsk
  - Portugal defeated Spain, 8–3, to win their first European Games gold medal.
  - Switzerland won the bronze medal.
- July 19 – 27: 2019 UEFA Qualifier for the FIFA Beach Soccer World Cup in Moscow
  - Russia defeated Italy, 7–1, to book their team and compete at the 2019 FIFA Beach Soccer World Cup.
  - Note: Both teams mentioned above, along with Belarus, Switzerland, & Portugal have also qualified to compete at the 2019 FIFA Beach Soccer World Cup.
- August 3 – 5: 2019 World Beach Games - Americas Qualifier in San Salvador
  - Men: 1. Mexico, 2. El Salvador, 3. United States, 4. Panama
  - Note 1: Mexico and El Salvador have qualified to compete at the 2019 World Beach Games.
  - Women: 1. Mexico, 2. United States, 3. Bahamas, 4. El Salvador
  - Note 2: Mexico (women's team) has qualified to compete at the 2019 World Beach Games.
- October 12 – 16: Part of the 2019 World Beach Games in (Qatar) Doha
  - Men: (gold) Brazil; (silver) Russia; (bronze) Iran
  - Women: (gold) Spain; (silver) Great Britain; (bronze) Brazil
- November 21 – December 1: 2019 FIFA Beach Soccer World Cup in (Paraguay) Asunción
  - Portugal defeated Italy, 6–4, to win their third FIFA Beach Soccer World Cup title.
  - Russia took third place.

=== 2019 Euro Beach Soccer League ===
- July 5 – 7: EBSL #1 in Nazaré
  - Division A – Group 1: 1. Portugal, 2. Ukraine, 3. Switzerland, 4. Poland
  - Division A – Group 2: 1. Spain, 2. Russia, 3. Turkey, 4. Azerbaijan
  - Division B: 1. Georgia, 2. Bulgaria, 3. Denmark, 4. Norway
- August 16 – 18: EBSL #2 in Catania
  - Division A: 1. Italy, 2. Belarus, 3. Germany, 4. France
  - Division B – Main: 1. Hungary, 2. Estonia, 3. Lithuania, 4. Moldova
  - Division B – Group 1: 1. Greece, 2. Romania, 3. Finland, 4. Serbia
  - Division B – Group 2: 1. Czech Republic, 2. Kazakhstan, 3. England, 4. Netherlands
- September 5 – 8: Euro Beach Soccer League Superfinal & Promotion Final in Figueira da Foz
  - Superfinal: Portugal defeated Russia, 4–2, to win their sixth Euro Beach Soccer League title.
    - Spain took third place.
  - Promotional Final: Azerbaijan defeated Kazakhstan, 2–1, to win their second Euro Beach Soccer League Promotional title.
    - Romania took third place.

=== BSWW ===
- February 27 – March 3: 2019 Mundialito de Clubes in (Russia) Moscow
  - (Portugal) S.C. Braga defeated (Italy) Domusbet Catania BS, 7–6, in the final.
  - (Brazil) CR Flamengo took third place.
- March 20 – 23: 2019 South American Beach Games in Rosario
  - Brazil defeated Argentina, 8–1, to win the gold medal in this event.
  - Colombia defeated Paraguay, 6–5, to win the bronze medal in this event.
- April 16 – 21: 2019 InterCup in Saint Petersburg
  - Russia defeated BSC Kristall, 7–6, in the final.
  - Italy took third place.
- April 26 – 28: 2019 CFA Belt and Road International Beach Soccer Cup in Haikou
  - Champions: Portugal; Second: England; Third: China; Fourth: Czech Republic
- May 30 – June 5: 2019 Euro Winners Challenge in (Portugal) Nazaré
  - Group A winners: (Portugal) CF Chelas
  - Group B winners: (Portugal) G.D. Sesimbra
  - Group C winners: (Russia) BSC CSKA Moscow
  - Group D winners: (Russia) BSC Lokomotiv Moscow
  - Group E winners: (Portugal) Grupo Desportivo de Alfarim
  - Group F winners: (Greece) AO Kefallinia
- June 1 – 9: 2019 Euro Winners Cup in (Portugal) Nazaré
  - (Portugal) Braga defeated (Poland) KP Łódź, 6–0, to win their third consecutive Euro Winners Cup title.
  - (Spain) Levante UD took third place.
- June 2 – 9: 2019 Women's Euro Winners Cup in (Portugal) Nazaré
  - (Spain) AIS Playas de San Javier defeated fellow Spanish team, Madrid CFF, 2–0 in penalties and after a 3–3 score in regular play, to win their first Women's Euro Winners Cup title.
  - (France) Stade de Reims took third place.
- June 7 – 9: NASSC – US Open 2019 in (United States) Virginia Beach
  - For detailed results, click here .
- July 5 – 7: 2019 Women's Euro Beach Soccer Cup in (Portugal) Nazaré
  - Russia defeated Spain, 3–2, to win their second consecutive Women's Euro Beach Soccer Cup title.
  - Switzerland took third place.
- July 12 – 14: 2019 BSWW Tour #1 - Talent Beach Soccer Cup in Budapest
  - Champions: Spain; Second: Poland; Third: Hungary; Fourth: Czech Republic
- July 12 – 14: 2019 BSWW Tour #2 – Morocco Beach Soccer Cup in Agadir
  - Champions: Oman; Second: Morocco; Third: Netherlands; Fourth: Algeria
- July 12 – 14: 2019 Clubs Challenger Cup in (Brazil) São Sebastião (debut event)
  - Champions: (Paraguay) Cerro Porteño; Second: (Brazil) Flamengo; Third: (Paraguay) Club Libertad; Fourth: (Argentina) Rosario Central
- July 17 – 20: 2019 Neom Beach Soccer Cup in Saudi Arabia
  - Oman defeated Egypt, 5–4 at extra time, to win their first Neom Beach Soccer Cup title.
  - United Arab Emirates took third place.
- August 13 – 15: 2019 BSWW Mundialito Nazaré in Portugal
  - Champions: Portugal; Second: Senegal; Third: Spain; Fourth: Japan
- September 4 – 2020: 2019 South American Beach Soccer League in Argentina, Ecuador and TBD
- September 7 – 11: BSWW Tour #3 – Goalfun CFA China-Latin America Beach Soccer Championship in Tangshan
  - Champions: Uruguay; Second: El Salvador; Third: China
- October 21 – 27: 2019 World Winners Cup in (Turkey) Alanya
  - Men: (Brazil) CR Flamengo defeated (China) Meizhou Hakka, 5–3, in the final.
  - Women: (Italy) Pavia Lokrians defeated (Poland) Lady Grembach EE Łódź, 3–0, in the final.
- November 1 – 3: BSWW Tour #4 – Copa Lagos in Nigeria
  - Champions: Senegal; Second: Nigeria; Third: Brazil; Fourth: England
- November 5 – 9: 2019 Intercontinental Beach Soccer Cup in Dubai
  - Iran defeated Spain, 6–3, in the final. The United Arab Emirates took third place.

== Detailed futsal results ==
=== UEFA (futsal) ===
- February 14 – 17: UEFA Women's Futsal Euro 2019 Finals in Gondomar (debut event)
  - Spain defeated Portugal, 4–0, to win the inaugural UEFA Women's Futsal Euro title.
  - Russia took third place.
- April 26 – 28: 2018–19 UEFA Futsal Champions League Finals in (Kazakhstan) Almaty
  - (Portugal) Sporting CP defeated (Kazakhstan) AFC Kairat, 2–1, to win their first UEFA Futsal Champions League title.
  - (Spain) Barcelona took third place.
- July 15 – 23: European Universities Futsal Championship 2019 in (Portugal) Braga
  - Men: (Spain) University of Málaga defeated (Ukraine) National University of Kharkiv, 5–1, to win their 4th Men's European Universities Futsal Championship.
  - (Portugal) University of Minho took third place.
  - Women: (Spain) University of Murcia defeated (Germany) University of Münster, 3–1, to win their first Women's European Universities Futsal Championship.
  - (Ukraine) National Pedagogical Dragomanov University took third place.
- September 8 – 14: 2019 UEFA Under-19 Futsal Championship in (Latvia) Riga (debut event)
  - Spain defeated Croatia, 6–1, to win the inaugural UEFA Under-19 Futsal Championship title.

=== CONMEBOL (futsal) ===
National teams

- October 21 – 30: 2019 Copa América de Futsal in (Chile) Santiago
  - Tournament suspended due to 2019 Chilean protests.
- December 13 – 20: 2019 Copa América Femenina de Futsal in (Paraguay) Luque
  - Brazil defeated Argentina, 4–1, to win their second in a row and a record sixth overall Copa América de Futsal title.
  - Colombia took third place.

Clubs

- July 14 – 21: 2019 Copa Libertadores de Futsal in (Argentina) Buenos Aires
  - (Brazil) Carlos Barbosa defeated (Paraguay) Cerro Porteño, 3–1, to win their third consecutive and seventh overall Copa Libertadores de Futsal title.
  - (Colombia) Alianza Platanera took third place.
- December 1 – 8: 2019 Copa Libertadores Femenina de Futsal in (Brazil) Camboriú
  - (Brazil) Cianorte defeated (Colombia) Independiente Cali, 2–0, to win their first Copa Libertadores Femenina de Futsal title.
  - (Argentina) Kimberley took third place.

=== AFC (futsal) ===
- June 14 – 22: 2019 AFC U-20 Futsal Championship in Tabriz
  - Japan defeated Afghanistan, 3–1, to win their first AFC U-20 Futsal Championship title.
  - Iran took third place.
- June 18 – 23: 2019 AFF Futsal Club Championship in (Thailand) Nakhon Ratchasima
  - (Thailand) Chonburi Bluewave Futsal Club defeated (Vietnam) Sanvinest Sanatech Khanh Hoa, 9–1, to win their first AFF Futsal Club Championship title.
  - Myanmar Imperial University took third place.
- August 7 – 17: 2019 AFC Futsal Club Championship in (Thailand) Bangkok
  - (Japan) Nagoya Oceans defeated (Iran) Mes Sungun FSC, 2–0, to win their fourth AFC Futsal Club Championship title.
  - (Vietnam) Thái Sơn Nam took third place.
- October 21 – 27: 2019 AFF Futsal Championship in Ho Chi Minh City
  - Thailand defeated Indonesia, 5–0, to win their eighth consecutive and 15th overall AFF Futsal Championship title.
  - Vietnam took third place.

=== OFC (futsal) ===
- October 27 – November 2: 2019 OFC Futsal Nations Cup in (New Caledonia) Noumea
  - The Solomon Islands defeated New Zealand, 2–1 in penalties and after a 5–5 score in regular play, to win their second consecutive and sixth overall OFC Futsal Nations Cup title.
  - Tahiti took third place.
  - Note: The Solomon Islands has qualified to compete at the 2020 FIFA Futsal World Cup.

== Deaths ==
=== January ===
- January 1
  - Ivan Dimitrov, Bulgarian footballer (born 1935)
  - Freddie Glidden, Scottish footballer (born 1927)
- January 21 – Emiliano Sala, Argentine footballer (born 1990)
- January 24 – Hugh McIlvanney, Scottish football journalist (born 1934)

=== February ===
- February 3 – Stephen Negoesco, Romanian-American soccer player and coach (born 1925)
- February 5 – Joe Fascione, Scottish former footballer and manager (born 1945)
- February 8 – Fernando Clavijo, Uruguayan-American soccer player and coach (born 1956)
- February 9
  - Katharina Lindner, German footballer (born 1979)
  - Ian Ross, Scottish former footballer and manager (born 1947)
- February 12 – Gordon Banks, English goalkeeper (born 1937)
- February 17 – Johnny Valentine, Scottish footballer (born 1930)

=== March ===
- March 4 – Eric Caldow, Scottish former football and manager (born 1934)
- March 25 – Barrie Hole, Welsh footballer (born 1942)

=== April ===
- April 12 – Ivor Broadis, English former footballer and manager (born 1922)
- April 22 – Billy McNeill, Scottish former footballer and manager (born 1940)
- April 26 – Jimmy Banks, American soccer player (born 1964)
- April 29
  - Stevie Chalmers, Scottish footballer (born 1935)
  - Josef Šural, Czech footballer (born 1990)

=== May ===
- May 13 – George Smith, Scottish football referee (born 1943)
- May 16 – David Cervinski, Australian soccer player (born 1970)
- May 26 – Harry Hood, Scottish former footballer and manager (born 1944)

=== June ===
- June 1 – José Antonio Reyes, Spanish footballer (born 1983)
- June 4
  - George Darwin, English footballer (born 1932)
  - Lawrie Leslie, Scottish footballer (born 1935)
- June 6 – Johnny Robinson, English footballer (born 1936)
- June 8 – Justin Edinburgh, English former footballer and manager (born 1969)
- June 13: Geoff Lees, English footballer (born 1933)
- June 17: Ian MacFarlane, English former footballer and manager (born 1933)
- June 19: Dennis White, English footballer (born 1948)

=== July ===
- July 1 – Renato Dehò, 72, Italian footballer.

=== August ===
- August 2 – Gildo Cunha do Nascimento, 79, Brazilian footballer (Palmeiras, Flamengo, Paranaense).

=== September ===
- September 2 – Gyoji Matsumoto, 85, Japanese footballer (national team), heart disease.

=== October ===
- October 1 – Fred Molyneux, 75, English footballer (Southport, Plymouth Argyle, Tranmere Rovers).

=== November ===
- November 1 – Diana González, 26, Mexican footballer (América), hypoglycemia.

=== December ===
- December 2 – Francesco Janich, 82, Italian footballer (Lazio, Bologna, national team).
