= Zablon Amanaka =

Kenyan footballer (1976–2021)

Personal information
- Full name: Zablon Davies Amanaka
- Date of birth: 1 January 1976
- Date of death: 28 May 2021 (aged 45)
- Position: Defender

Senior career*
Years	Team	Apps	(Gls)
1998	Kenya Breweries		
2002–2004	Kenya Pipeline		
2004	St Michel United FC		
2004–2006	Željezničar	14	(0)
2005–2006	Thika United		
2006–2007	AFC Leopards		
2007	East Bengal		
2007–2008	Anse Réunion		
2009	Sofapaka		
2009	La Passe		
2010	Mahakama	10	(0)

International career
2004–2009	Kenya	15	(0)
- * Club domestic league appearances and goals

Zablon Davies Amanaka (1 January 1976 – 28 May 2021) was a Kenyan professional footballer who played as a defender.

== Club career ==
After playing in clubs like Kenya Breweries (former name of Tusker FC) and Kenya Pipeline from Nairobi, in 2004 he had a spell in Seychelles League club Saint-Michel United. From January 2005 until January 2006, he played in the Bosnian Premier League's traditionally strongest club, Željezničar from the capital Sarajevo. Then he returned to play in Kenyan Premier League clubs Thika United and AFC Leopards. From January to June 2007, he was in India in I-League club East Bengal Club. Next, he moved to Seychelles club Anse Réunion FC. In January 2009, he was back to his country playing for Sofapaka, but after six months he signed with another Seychelles club, La Passe FC. At end of 2009, he returned to Kenya and played with Mahakama. He usually played as central defender.

== International career ==
He played regularly for the Kenya national team since 1998, having achieved team captain.

== Honours ==
Saint-Michel United

- Seychelles League: 2003

FK Željezničar

- Premier League of Bosnia and Herzegovina runner-up: 2004-05

East Bengal Club

- Indian Federation Cup: 2007

Anse Réunion FC

- Seychelles League Cup: 2007

== External sources ==
- Article on Kangemi Utd. about Amanaka and other Kenyan players
