= Allen Larue =

Seychellois footballer

Personal information
- Full name: Allen Larue
- Date of birth: 16 June 1981 (age 45)
- Place of birth: Seychelles
- Position: Defender

Team information
- Current team: St Michel United FC

Senior career*
Years	Team	Apps	(Gls)
2003–2007	Red Star Anse-aux-Pins		
2007–	St Michel United FC		

International career
2002–	Seychelles	13	(0)
Medal record
Men's football
Representing Seychelles
Indian Ocean Island Games
Gold medal – first place	2011 Seychelles
- * Club domestic league appearances and goals

Allen Larue (born 16 June 1981) is an association footballer from the Seychelles. He plays as a defender and has played for the Seychelles national football team. He plays for St Michel United FC in the Seychelles First Division, having also played for Red Star Anse-aux-Pins in the early years of his career.

== Club career ==
=== Red Star Anse-aux-Pins ===
Allen started his career at Red Star Anse-aux-Pins and spent four years at the club, from 2003 until 2007. Red Star Anse-aux-Pins had won the title in 2001, shortly before Allen's arrival, but have failed to win the Seychelles First Division since. In search of silverware, Larue left the club in 2007.

=== St Michel United FC ===
Larue has since moved to another club in the Seychelles, St Michel United FC. During his time at St Michel, the Seychelles' second-most successful team have won the league title three times in four years, 2008 being the only occasion during Allen's spell at the club that they have failed to win the league. Allen was also part of the St Michel squad who won the President's Cup in 2011, beating St. Louis Suns United in the final, although the defender was partly at fault for St Louis' second goal.

== International career ==
The defender has played thirteen games for his country. One of his first games for the Seychelles came in the 2004 African Cup of Nations qualifier against Zimbabwe. Larue conceded a penalty for a foul on Benjani Mwaruwari as the Seychelles lost 3-1.

His most recent involvement with the Seychelles national football team was in July 2011, when Seychelles played a friendly against Tanzania U-23. Allen scored his first goal for the Seychelles in the resulting 3-1 loss.

== Honours ==
Seychelles

- Indian Ocean Island Games: Gold Medalist, 2011
