= Football in Seychelles =

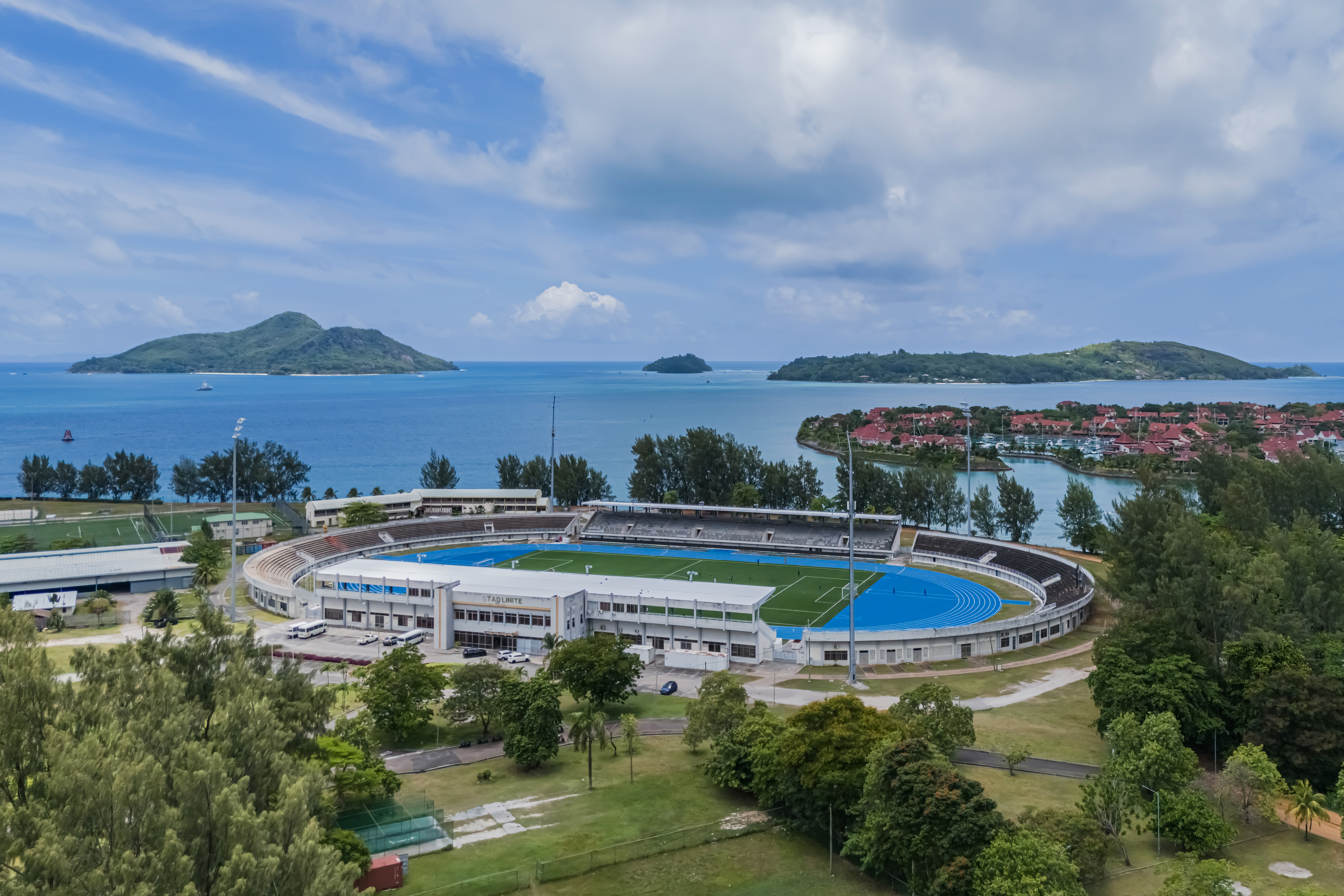
- The Stade Linité in Victoria
- Country: Seychelles
- Governing body: Seychelles Football Federation
- National team: national football team

Club competitions
- Seychelles First Division

International competitions
- Champions League; CAF Confederation Cup; Super Cup; FIFA Club World Cup; FIFA World Cup(National Team); African Cup of Nations(National Team)

The sport of football in the Seychelles is run by the Seychelles Football Federation established in 1979. The association administers the national football team, as well as the Premier League.

Football is the most popular sport in the Seychelles. The nation's domestic football structure includes the Seychelles First Division, as well as other local leagues and cup competitions such as the Seychelles FA Cup and President’s Cup. Saint Louis FC is the most successful club, having won the league multiple times. The league has ten clubs in the first division and additional teams in the lower divisions.

== League system ==
| Level | League(s)/Division(s) |
|---|---|
| 1 | Barclays League Division One; 10 clubs |
| | ↓↑ 1-2 clubs |
| 2 | Barclays League Division Two; 8 clubs |
| | ↓↑ 1-2 clubs |
| 3 | Barclays League Division Three; 10 clubs |

== Football stadiums in Seychelles ==
| Stadium | Capacity | City | Tenants | Image |
|---|---|---|---|---|
| Stad Linite | 10,000 | Victoria | Seychelles national football team | |

== See also ==
- Lists of stadiums
