= Nigel Freminot =

Seychellois footballer

Personal information
- Date of birth: 5 June 1980 (age 46)
- Place of birth: Seychelles
- Position: Defender

Senior career*
Years	Team	Apps	(Gls)
2005–2007	Red Star		
2008–2012	Saint Michel United		
2013–2014	Saint Louis Suns United		

International career
2007–2011	Seychelles	21	(0)
Medal record
Men's football
Representing Seychelles
Indian Ocean Island Games
Gold medal – first place	2011 Seychelles
- * Club domestic league appearances and goals

Nigel Freminot (born 5 June 1980) is a Seychellois former footballer who played as a defender in the Seychelles Premier League.

== Honours ==
Seychelles

- Indian Ocean Island Games: Gold Medalist, 2011
