= David Dorby =

Seychellois football player

Personal information
- Date of birth: 18 January 1974 (age 52)
- Position: Midfielder

Senior career*
Years	Team	Apps	(Gls)
2007–2009	SMB Victoria		
2010–2011	Saint Louis Suns United		

International career
1996–2008	Seychelles MNT	9	(0)
- * Club domestic league appearances and goals

David Dorby (born 18 January 1974) is a Seychellois football player. He is a midfielder on the Seychelles national football team.

== See also ==
- Seychelles Football Federation
