= Jonathan Bibi =

Seychellois football player

Personal information
- Full name: Jonathan Bibi
- Date of birth: 28 July 1984 (age 42)
- Position: Defender

Team information
- Current team: Saint Louis Suns United

Senior career*
Years	Team	Apps	(Gls)
2003–2006	La Passe		
2007–	Saint Louis Suns United		

International career
2003–2011	Seychelles	29	(0)
Medal record
Men's football
Representing Seychelles
Indian Ocean Island Games
Gold medal – first place	2011 Seychelles
- * Club domestic league appearances and goals

Jonathan Bibi (born 28 July 1984) is a Seychellois football player who plays as a defender for Seychelles Premier League club Saint Louis Suns United.

Bibi helped Seychelles win the football tournament at the 2011 Indian Ocean Games in August 2011.

== Honours ==
Seychelles

- Indian Ocean Island Games: Gold Medalist, 2011
