= Pascal Razakanantenaina =

Malagasy footballer

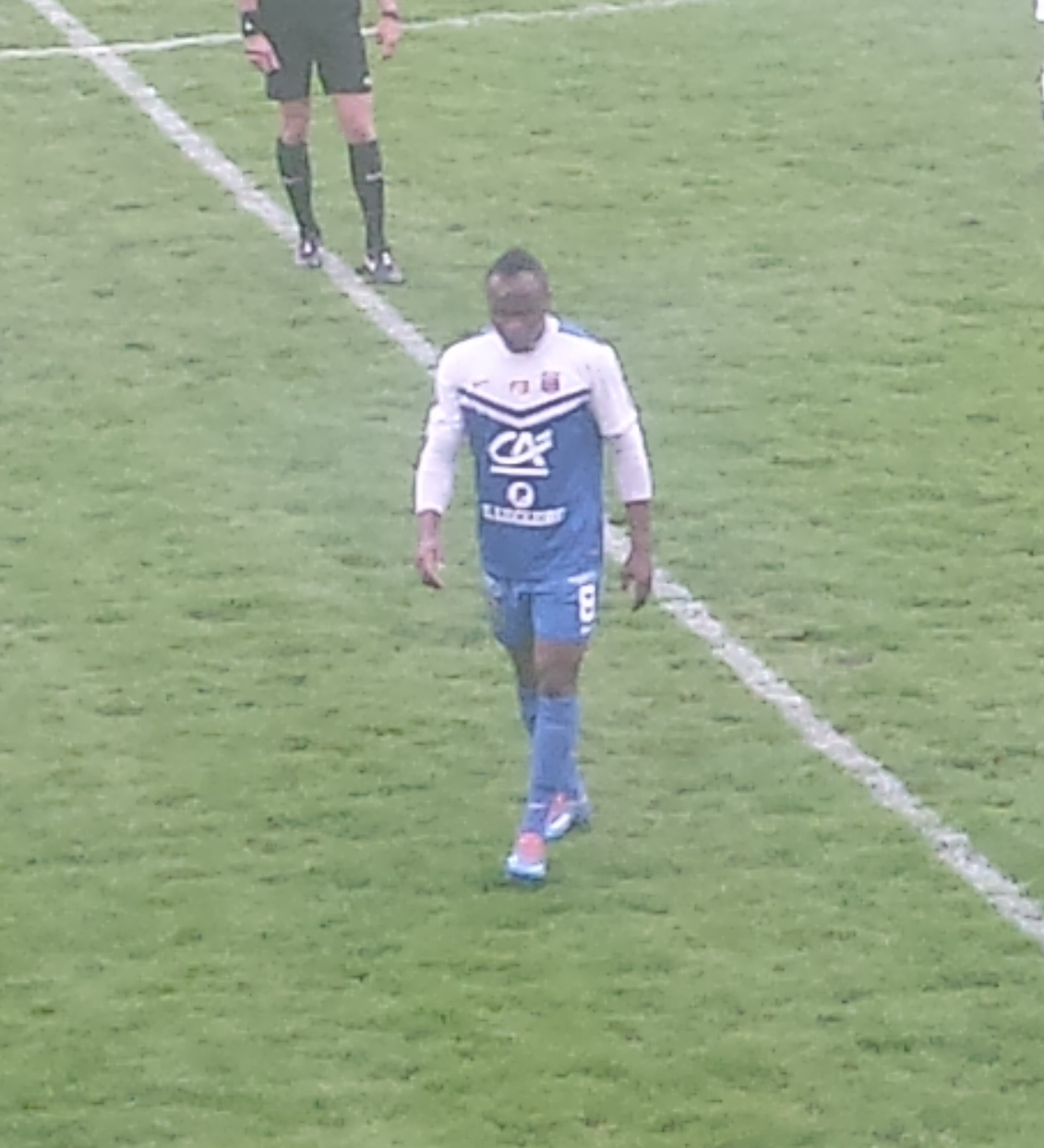
- Razakanantenaina in April 2015

Personal information
- Full name: Pascal Razakanantenaina
- Date of birth: 19 April 1987 (age 39)
- Place of birth: Mahajanga, Madagascar
- Height: 1.80 m (5 ft 11 in)
- Positions: Centre back; centre midfielder

Senior career*
Years	Team	Apps	(Gls)
2006–2009	St Michel United		
2009–2011	CS Avion	27	(2)
2011–2014	Calais RUFC	55	(8)
2014–2018	Arras FA	104	(11)
2018–	JS Saint-Pierroise		

International career^{‡}
2007–	Madagascar	33	(2)
- * Club domestic league appearances and goals as of 09:38, 14 July 2019 (UTC) ‡ National team caps and goals as of 09:42, 17 November 2020 (UTC)

Pascal Razakanantenaina (born 19 April 1987) is a Malagasy professional footballer who plays as a centre back for JS Saint-Pierroise.

== International career ==
=== International ===
As of matches played on 14 July 2019

Madagascar national team
Year	Apps	Goals
2007	5	0
2008	4	0
2009	0	0
2010	2	0
2011	2	0
2012	1	0
2013	0	0
2014	0	0
2015	0	0
2016	1	1
2017	4	1
2018	5	0
2019	6	0
Total	30	2

=== International goals ===
Scores and results list Madagascar's goal tally first.

No	Date	Venue	Opponent	Score	Result	Competition
1.	3 September 2016	Estádio 11 de Novembro, Luanda, Angola	Angola	1–0	1–1	2017 Africa Cup of Nations qualification
2.	11 November 2017	Stade Municipal Saint-Leu-la-Forêt, Paris, France	Comoros	1–0	1–1	Friendly

== Honours ==
St. Michel United

- Seychelles First Division: 2007, 2008
- Seychelles FA Cup: 2006, 2007, 2008, 2009

JS Saint-Pierroise

- Réunion Premier League: 2018, 2019
- Coupe de la Réunion: 2018, 2019

Madagascar

- Football at the Indian Ocean Island Games silver medal: 2007
- Knight Order of Madagascar: 2019

Individual

- Round of 16 best squad : Africa Cup Of Nation Egypt 2019
