= Rashim Padayachy =

Seychellois footballer

Personal information
- Full name: Rashim Kiren Blaise Keith Padayachy
- Date of birth: 3 February 1994 (age 32)
- Position: Defensive midfielder

Team information
- Current team: Red Star FC

Senior career*
Years	Team	Apps	(Gls)
2013–2018	The Lions FC		
2019–	Red Star FC		

International career
2014–	Seychelles	20	(0)
- * Club domestic league appearances and goals

Rashim Padayachy (born 3 February 1994) is a Seychellois football midfielder who plays for Red Star FC. He was a squad member for the 2015, 2017, 2018 and 2019 COSAFA Cups and the 2019 Indian Ocean Island Games.
