= Osama Haroun =

French football manager

Personal information
- Date of birth: 15 December 1975 (age 50)
- Place of birth: Marseille, France

Managerial career
- Years: Team
- 1996–2005: ES Vitrolles
- 2009–2016: FC Côte Bleue
- 2017–2019: FC Martigues (Sporting Director)
- 2019–2021: SC Toulon (Assistant)
- 2021–2024: Seychelles (Technical Director)
- 2021: Seychelles

Osama Haroun is a French football manager who is currently the Technical Director of the Seychelles national team.

== Career ==
Haroun was never a footballer and did not take an interest in the sport as a child. He began his coaching career with ES Vitrolles in 1996. Until 2005 he held various administrative and coaching roles within the club.

He took over as head coach of FC Côte Bleue in 2009. He led the team to five successive promotions up to the Division d'Honneur, the sixth division of French football. He left the club in November 2016. In August 2017 he was unveiled as the new Sporting Director of FC Martigues. One of his first orders of business was signing former Ligue 1 striker Paul Alo'o to the club. In July 2019 Haroun was unveiled as the new assistant coach of SC Toulon.

Haroun was named Technical Director of the Seychelles national football team in June 2021. He had a short stint as the team's manager during a friendly tournament in Comoros the following September. In June 2022 it was announced that the Seychelles Football Federation had established the nation's first professional-quality football institute, the Institut Football Seychellois. Haroun was instrumental in its creation.
