= Milison Niasexe =

Malagasy footballer (born 1986)

Personal information
- Full name: Milison Niasexe
- Date of birth: 16 February 1986 (age 40)
- Place of birth: Toliara, Madagascar
- Position: Forward

Team information
- Current team: Anse Réunion
- Number: 9

Youth career
- 2004–2006: AS Adema

Senior career*
Years	Team	Apps	(Gls)
2007–2008	AS Adema	39	(15)
2009–	Anse Réunion	22	(4)

International career^{‡}
2008–	Madagascar	4	(0)
- * Club domestic league appearances and goals ‡ National team caps and goals as of 6 March 2017

Milison Niasexe (born 16 February 1986 in Toliara) is a Malagasy professional footballer who currently plays for Anse Réunion.

== International career ==
He is a member of Madagascar national team.
