= Jude Nancy =

Seychellois footballer

Personal information
- Date of birth: 12 June 1984 (age 42)
- Position: Defender

Team information
- Current team: Saint Louis Suns United FC

Senior career*
Years	Team	Apps	(Gls)
2007–2009?	Saint Louis Suns United FC		
2011–2017	The Lions FC		
2018–	Saint Louis Suns United FC		

International career
2011–	Seychelles	17	(0)
- * Club domestic league appearances and goals

Jude Nancy (born 12 June 1984) is a Seychelles football player who plays for Saint Louis Suns United FC. He was a squad member for the 2019 COSAFA Cup and the 2019 Indian Ocean Island Games.
