= Seychelles FA Cup =

Football competition in the Seychelles

The Seychelles FA Cup is the top knockout tournament of the Seychelles football. It was created in 1987.

== Winners ==
Winners so far are:

- 1976: Rangers 6-2 Ascot
- 1977-1986: unknown
- 1987: Beau Vallon
- 1988: Saint-Louis FC 2-1 Plaisance FC
- 1989: Anse Boileau
- 1990: Plaisance FC
- 1991: Anse aux Pins FC
- 1992: unknown winner
- 1993: Anse aux Pins FC
- 1994: unknown winner
- 1995: Red Star FC
- 1996: Red Star FC
- 1997: St Michel United FC
- 1998: St Michel United FC 4-0 Ascot United
- 1999: Red Star FC 2-1 Sunshine FC
- 2000: Sunshine FC 1-1 (4-2 pen.) Red Star FC
- 2001: St Michel United FC 2-1 Sunshine FC
- 2002: Anse Réunion FC 2-1 Red Star FC
- 2003: Saint-Louis FC 2-1 (asdet) Light Stars FC
- 2004: Red Star FC 1-0 Anse Réunion FC
- 2005: Super Magic Brothers 1-0 Anse Réunion FC
- 2006: St Michel United FC 2-1 Red Star FC
- 2007: St Michel United FC 1-0 Anse Réunion FC
- 2008: St Michel United FC 2-2 2-0 St Louis Suns United
- 2009: St Michel United FC 2-1 St Louis Suns United
- 2010: St Louis Suns United 1-0 La Passe FC
- 2011: St Michel United FC 3-1 La Passe FC
- 2012: Anse Réunion FC 3-2 Côte d'Or FC
- 2013: St Michel United FC 2-0 Anse Réunion FC
- 2014: St Michel United FC 1-1 (aet; 5-4 pen.) Côte d'Or FC
- 2015: Light Stars FC 2-2 (aet; 4-2 pen.) Northern Dynamo FC
- 2016: St Michel United FC 3-2 Northern Dynamo FC
- 2017: St Louis Suns United 3-1 Anse Réunion FC
- 2018–19: St Louis Suns United 2-0 La Passe FC
- 2020: Foresters 4-2 Côte d'Or FC
- 2021-22: Not held
- 2023: La Passe FC 1-0 Anse Réunion FC
- 2024: Foresters 2-1 La Passe FC
- 2025: Foresters 1–0 Light Stars FC
