= Stade d'Amitié =

Coordinates: 4.3216°S 55.6893°E

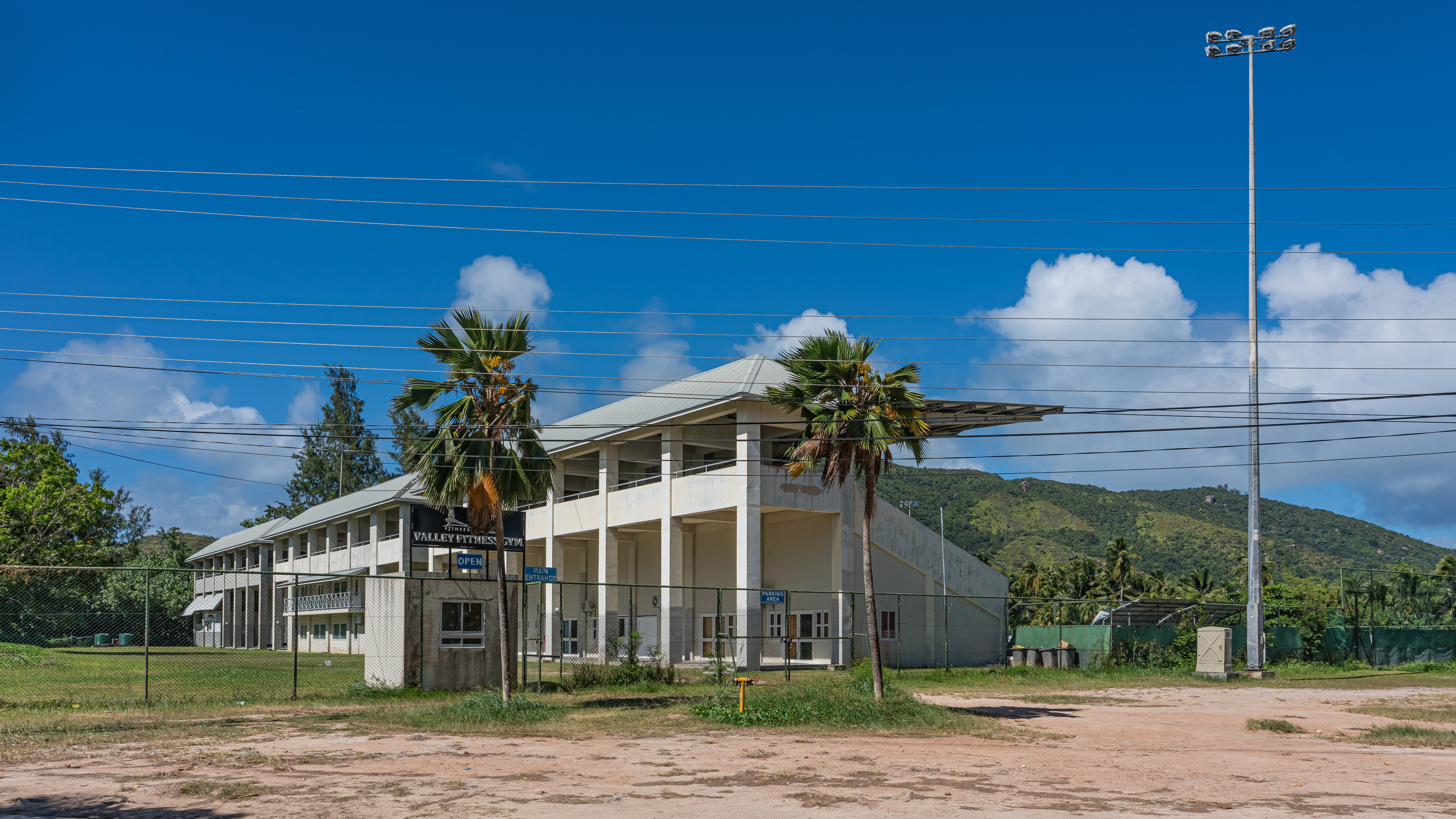

Stade d’Amitié or Amitié Stadium is a multi-purpose stadium located in Praslin, Seychelles. It is used mostly for football matches and is the home stadium of Seychellois football clubs Revengers FC and Côte d'Or FC.

In 2006 and 2010, two Goal Projects by FiFA were approved at the stadium. The first one replaced the natural grass pitch with artificial turf, and the second one included the construction of terraces, dressing rooms, toilets, and lights.
