= Red Star FC (Seychelles) =

Red Star
- Full name: Red Star Football Club
- Founded: 1993
- Ground: Stade Linité; Seychelles
- Capacity: 10,000
- League: Seychelles Second Division

Red Star Football Club is a football club from Anse-aux-Pins, Seychelles. It originated in 1993 after the dissolution of the merger between Anse-aux-Pins FC and St Michel United FC. The club plays in the Seychelles Second Division. It has been crowned champions of Seychelles on two occasions.

== Achievements ==
- Seychelles League: 2

1998, 2001

- Seychelles FA Cup: 4

1995, 1996, 1999, 2004

== Performance in CAF competitions ==
- CAF Champions League: 1 appearance

2002 – Preliminary Round

== Stadium ==
Currently the team plays at the 10,000 capacity Stade Linité.
