= Light Stars FC =

Light Stars
- Full name: Light Stars FC
- Ground: Amitié Stadium, Seychelles
- Capacity: 2,000
- Chairman: Marc Volcere
- Manager: James Barra
- League: Seychelles League
- 2025–26: 7th

Light Stars FC is a Seychelles based football club, they are playing in the Seychelles League.

The team is based in Grand'Anse Praslin in Praslin island.

== Stadium ==
Currently, the team plays at the 2,000 capacity Stade d’Amitié.
