= Saint Louis Suns United FC =

Saint-Louis Football Club
- Full name: Saint-Louis Suns United Football Club
- Nickname: Saints
- Founded: 1 March 2007; 19 years ago
- Ground: Stade Linité, Victoria, Seychelles
- Capacity: 10,000
- Chairman: Jeff Cooper
- Manager: Devis Khan
- Coach: Michel Renaud
- League: Seychelles Premier League
- 2025–26: 8th
Home colours	Away colours

Saint-Louis Suns United, is a football club based in Victoria, Seychelles. The club was formed as the result of a 2007 merger between Saint-Louis (founded in 1985) and Sunshine (1993).

== History ==
Saint Louis Suns United was founded on 2007 after merger with Saint-Louis FC (established on the 1970s) and Sunshine SC (established on 1993).

Saint Louis won 13 Division One League titles between 1979 and 1994, and made several appearances in continental competitions. Sunshine won its first in 1995, after only two years in existence. The following year Sunshine made its debut in international competition as it represented Seychelles in the African Cup of Champions Clubs. From its foundation the team has kept on playing in the top division.

== Current squad ==
Note: Flags indicate national team as defined under FIFA eligibility rules; some limited exceptions apply. Players may hold more than one non-FIFA nationality.

No.	Pos.	Nation	Player
-	DF	SEY	Jonathan Bibi (vice-captain)
-	DF	SEY	Nigel Freminot
-	DF	SEY	Steve Henriette
-	DF	SEY	Jean-Paul Adela (captain)
6	DF	SEY	Roddy Melanie
7	ST	SEY	Darrel Damoo
-	RB	SEY	Jude Nancy
-	MID	SEY	Terry Crea
-	DM	SEY	Rachim Padayachy
-	MF	SEY	Travis Laurance
-	MF	SEY	Yannick Julie
-	MF	SEY	Imra Raheriania
-	MF	SEY	Majid Ferminot
-	MF	SEY	Danny Madelaine
19	DF	SEY	Ahmed Maurice
-	MF	SEY	Stephan Ladouce
-	CM	SEY	Johan Gamatice
-	FW	ENG	Karl Hall
-	RW	SEY	Gervais-Haye Wive
-	RW	SEY	Dean Mothe
-	RW	SEY	Mervin Mathiot
-	ST	SEY	Elijah Tamboo
-	FW	SEY	Gerrick Vidot
-	ST	SEY	Hubert Jean

== Achievements ==
- Seychelles League: 16

1979, 1980, 1981, 1983, 1985, 1986, 1987, 1988, 1989, 1990, 1991, 1992, 1994
1995 (as Sunshine SC)
2017, 2024 (as Saint Louis Suns United)

- Seychelles FA Cup: 5

1988, 2003 (as Saint-Louis FC)
2000 (as Sunshine SC)
2010, 2017, 2024 (as Saint Louis Suns United)

- Seychelles Presidents Cup: 2

2003 (as Saint-Louis FC)
2008 (as Saint Louis Suns United)

== Performance in CAF competitions ==
- African Cup of Champions Clubs: 5 appearances

1989: First Round
1990: First Round
1991: Preliminary Round
1992: Preliminary Round
1996: Preliminary Round

- CAF Confederation Cup: 1 appearance

2004 – Preliminary Round

- African Cup Winners' Cup: 2 appearances

1998: Preliminary Round
2001: Second Round
