= Foresters Mont Fleuri FC =

Foresters Mont Fleuri
- Full name: Foresters Mont Fleuri Football Club
- Ground: Mont Fleuri Playing Field; Mont Fleuri, Seychelles
- Capacity: 6,000
- Chairman: Hervé Marienne
- Manager: Leslie Mathiot
- League: Seychelles Premier League
- 2025–26: Champions
- Website: https://www.facebook.com/forestersfcseychelles/

Foresters Mont Fleuri Football Club is a Seychellois football club from Mont Fleuri, they are playing in the Seychelles Premier League.

== Current players ==
Note: Flags indicate national team as defined under FIFA eligibility rules; some limited exceptions apply. Players may hold more than one non-FIFA nationality.

| No. | Pos. | Nation | Player |
|---|---|---|---|
| — | GK | SEY | Andre Juliette |
| — | GK | SEY | Pascal Antoniette |
| — | GK | SEY | Eric Roselle |
| — | DF | SEY | Fabrice Brigitte |
| — | DF | SEY | Lilian Stéphan |
| — | DF | SEY | Tyrick Dernier |
| — | DF | SEY | Louis Adrienne |
| — | DF | SEY | Phillip Aurélien |
| — | DF | SEY | Michel Claude |
| — | DF | SEY | Cédric Julienne |
| — | MF | SEY | Moïse Bernardette |

| No. | Pos. | Nation | Player |
|---|---|---|---|
| — | MF | SEY | Robert Jean-Baptiste |
| — | MF | SEY | Adam Mathieu |
| — | MF | SEY | Frédéric Benoît |
| — | MF | SEY | Lucas Maximilien |
| — | MF | SEY | Abraham Thierry |
| — | MF | SEY | Theo Florentin |
| — | FW | SEY | Louis Arnaud |
| — | FW | SEY | Gaël Vivienne |
| — | FW | SEY | Lucas Alphonse |
| — | FW | SEY | Kevin Brabançonne |
| — | FW | SEY | Wilson Grégoire |
