= Anse Réunion FC =

- Full name: Anse Réunion Football Club
- Founded: 1957
- Ground: La Digue Playing Fields; Anse Réunion, Seychelles
- Chairman: George Évariste
- Manager: Thibault Corentin
- League: Seychelles League
- 2025–26: 5th
Home colours	Away colours

Anse Réunion FC is a Seychelles football club based in La Digue, which currently plays in the Seychelles League.

== Achievements ==
- Seychelles League: 1

2006

- Seychelles FA Cup: 2

2002, 2012

- Seychelles League Cup: 1

2007

== Performance in CAF competitions ==
- CAF Champions League: 1 appearance

2007 – Preliminary Round

- CAF Confederation Cup: 1 appearance

2008 – First Round

- CAF Cup Winners' Cup: 1 appearance

2003 – First Round

== Current squad ==
Note: Flags indicate national team as defined under FIFA eligibility rules; some limited exceptions apply. Players may hold more than one non-FIFA nationality.

No.	Pos.	Nation	Player
1	GK	SEY	Ricky Rose (Captain)
2	DF	PHI	Andy Ernesta
3	DF	PHI	Armantal Ernesta
4	DF	SEY	Stéphane Morel
5	DF	SEY	Pierre Nibourette
6	DF	SEY	Bernard Rose
7	MF	KEN	Silas Gwada

No.	Pos.	Nation	Player
8	MF	KEN	Dominique Kyambi
9	MF	SEY	Rodrick Rose
10	FW	MAD	Milison Niasexe
12	FW	SEY	Yelvanny Rose
13	MF	MAS	Muhammad Arif (Vice-captain)
—	GK	SEY	Ian Ah-Kong
—	DF	SEY	Don Fanchette
—	MF	TAN	Rashid Gumbo

== Players with dual nationality ==
- (Philippines) (Seychelles) Andy Ernesta
- (Philippines) (Seychelles) Armantal Ernesta

== Notable players ==
- Yelvanny Rose
