= Revengers FC =

- Full name: Revengers Football Club
- Ground: Stade d’Amitié
- Capacity: 2,000
- Coordinates: 4°19′17″S 55°41′21″E
- Chairman: Jorens Vidot
- Manager: Vincent Bonnelame
- Coach: Basil Hoareau
- League: Seychelles First Division
- 2025–26: TBD

Revengers Football Club also known as Revengers FC is a Seychellois football club based in Praslin, Seychelles. The club competes in Seychelles' premier league, the Seychelles First Division.

== Stadium ==
The club plays its home matches at Stade d’Amitié, a 2,000-capacity stadium located in Praslin.
