= La Passe FC =

- Full name: La Passe Football Club
- Founded: 1992
- Ground: Stade Linité
- Capacity: 10,000
- Manager: Bruno Saindini
- League: Seychelles League
- 2024–25: 9th

La Passe Football Club is a Seychelles based football club from the island of La Digue. They are playing in the Seychelles League.

Club won Seychelles League five times (2002, 2004, 2005, 2009, 2021–22).

== Current squad ==
Note: Flags indicate national team as defined under FIFA eligibility rules; some limited exceptions apply. Players may hold more than one non-FIFA nationality.

No.	Pos.	Nation	Player
—	GK	SEY	Arthur Etienne
—	GK	SEY	Christian Jules
—	DF	SEY	Eddie Lilianne
—	DF	SEY	Édouard Valérienne
—	DF	SEY	Roger Pierre
—	MF	SEY	Dion Moselle

No.	Pos.	Nation	Player
—	MF	SEY	James Achille
—	MF	SEY	Christopher Philippe
—	MF	SEY	Alan Brigitte
—	MF	SEY	Olivier Emmanuelle
—	FW	SEY	Adrien Françoise
—	FW	SEY	Paul Aurélienne

== Achievements ==
- Seychelles League
  - Champions (5): 2002, 2004, 2005, 2009, 2021–2022

== CAF competitions record ==
Season	Competition	Round	Club	Home	Away	Aggregate
2003	CAF Champions League	PR	(Mauritius) AS Port-Louis 2000	1–0	0–2	1–2
2005	CAF Champions League	PR	(Madagascar) USJF Ravinala	2–2	1–4	2–6
2006	CAF Champions League	PR	(Mozambique) Ferroviário	0–0	0–2	0–2
2010	CAF Champions League	PR	(Mauritius) Curepipe Starlight	1–0	1–3	2–3
2022–23	CAF Champions League	1Q	(Comoros) Volcan Club	w/o		
2022–23	CAF Champions League	2Q	(South Africa) Mamelodi Sundowns	0–7	1–8	1–15
2022–23	CAF Confederation Cup	PO	(Republic of the Congo) Diables Noirs	0–2	2–4	2–6

Notes

- PR: Preliminary round
- 1R: First round
- 2Q: Second qualifying round
- PO: Play-off round
- GS: Group stage
