= Northern Dynamo FC =

Northern Dynamo
- Full name: Northern Dynamo FC
- Founded: 1980
- Ground: Stade Linité, Seychelles
- Capacity: 10,000
- Chairman: Godfred Aurélien
- Manager: Raoul Joséphine
- League: Seychelles League
- 2024–25: 10th

Northern Dynamo FC is a Seychelles based football club, they are playing in the Seychelles League.

The team is based in Glacis, Seychelles in Mahe island.

== Stadium ==
Currently the team plays at the 10,000 capacity Stade Linité.
