= Stade Linité =

Stadium in Victoria, Seychelles

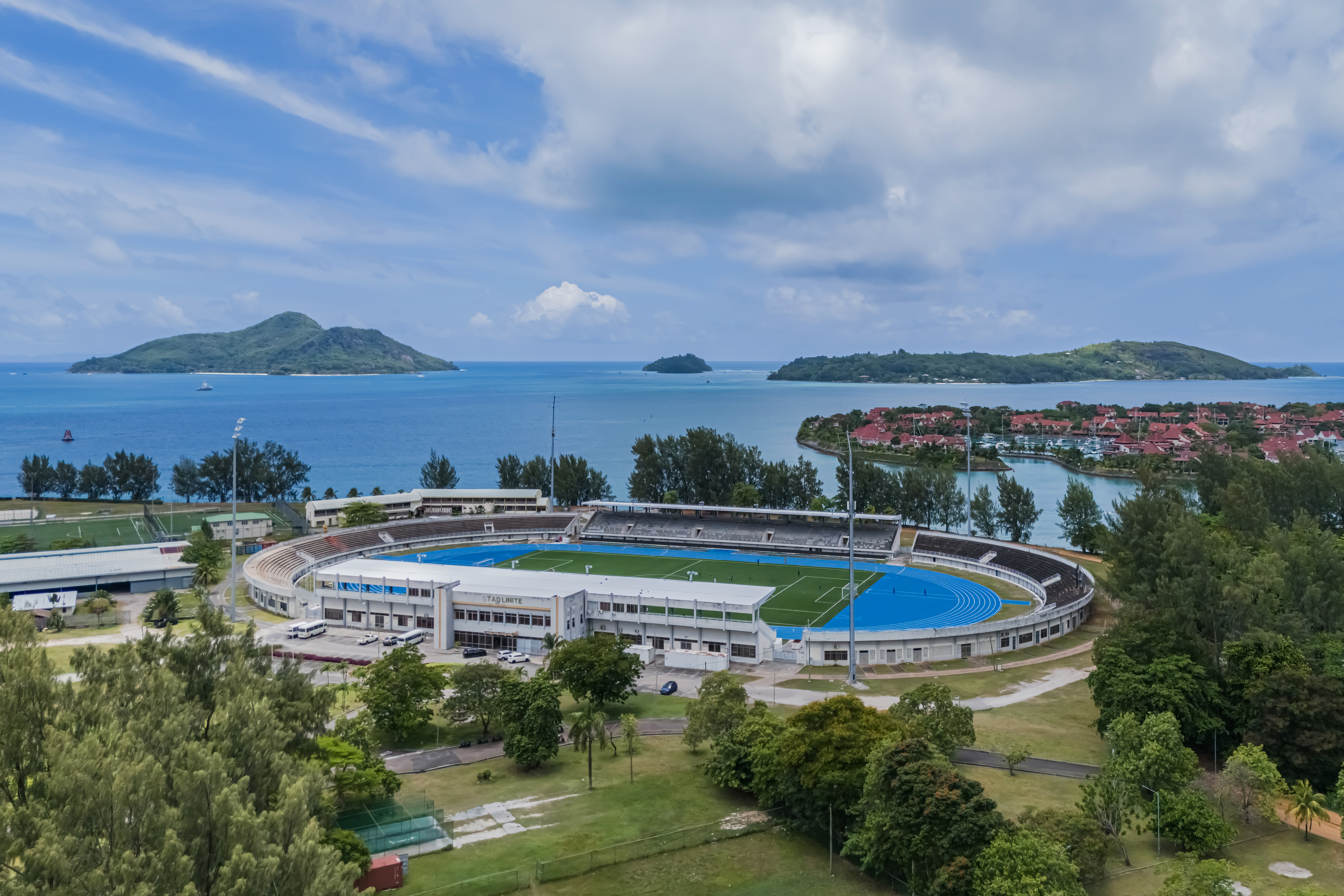
- Aerial view
- Interactive map of Stade Linité
- Location: Roche Caiman Sport Complex, Victoria, Mahe, Seychelles
- Coordinates: 4°38′7.84″S 55°28′13.66″E
- Owner: National Sports Council - Seychelles
- Operator: National Sports Council - Seychelles
- Capacity: 10,000
- Surface: Artificial turf, Track & field
- Field size: 100 m^{2}

Construction
- Built: 1992
- Opened: 1993
- Renovated: 2007

Tenants
- Seychelles national football team Saint Louis Suns United; St Michel United FC; The Lions FC

The Stad Linité (official name) is a multi-use stadium in Victoria, Seychelles. It is currently used mostly for football matches. The stadium holds 10,000 and was built in 1992. The stadium plays host also to most of the home games of the Seychelles national football team. The stadium received in February 2007 an artificial turf pitch 3rd generation, One Star field test, by FIFA's development programme "win in Africa with Africa".
