= Seychelles Premier League =

Association football league in Seychelles

- Founded: 1979; 47 years ago
- Country: Seychelles
- Confederation: CAF
- Number of clubs: 12
- Level on pyramid: 1
- Relegation to: Seychelles Championship League
- Domestic cup(s): Seychelles FA Cup; Seychelles League Cup (Airtel Cup)
- International cup(s): Champions League; Confederation Cup
- Current champions: Côte d'Or FC (2024-25)
- Most championships: Saint Louis Suns United (16 titles)
- Top scorer: Leroy Coralie (66 goals)
- Broadcaster: SBC
- Current: 2025-26 Seychelles Premier League

Seychelles Premier League is the top division of the Seychelles Football Federation, it was created in 1979.

On 11 September 2024, an agreement was signed by the managing director of Absa Bank Seychelles, Nazim Mahmood, and the chief executive of the Seychelles Football Federation, Dennis Rose. The two-year agreement will see Seychelles' top football division has been rebranded to Absa Premier League.

== Stadiums ==
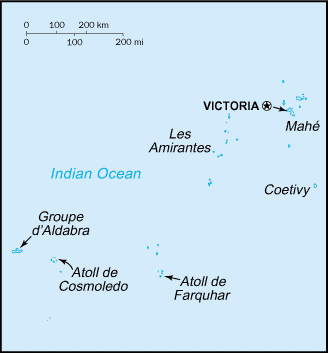
Seychelles map

=== Current stadiums ===
Anse Réunion FC	Côte d'Or FC	Foresters	La Passe FC	Light Stars FC	The Lions FC	Northern Dynamo FC	Revengers FC	Red Star Defence Forces	Saint John Bosco	St Louis Suns United	St Michel United FC
La Digue Playing Fields	Stade d’Amitié	Mont Fleuri Playing Field	La Passe Ground	Stade d’Amitié	Stade Linité	Glacis	Stade d’Amitié	Military Field	Ground	Stade Linité	Stade Linité
Capacity: 2,500	Capacity: 2,500	Capacity: 2,500	Capacity: 2,500	Capacity: 2,500	Capacity: 10,000	Capacity: 2,500	Capacity: 2,500	Capacity: 2,500	Capacity: 2,500	Capacity: 10,000	Capacity: 10,000

== Previous winners ==
- 1979 : Saint-Louis FC
- 1980 : Saint-Louis FC
- 1981 : Saint-Louis FC
- 1982 : Mont Fleuri FC
- 1983 : Saint-Louis FC
- 1984 : Mont Fleuri FC
- 1985 : Saint-Louis FC
- 1986 : Saint-Louis FC
- 1987 : Saint-Louis FC
- 1988 : Saint-Louis FC
- 1989 : Saint-Louis FC
- 1990 : Saint-Louis FC
- 1991 : Saint-Louis FC
- 1992 : Saint-Louis FC
- 1993 : no championship
- 1994 : Saint-Louis FC
- 1995 : Sunshine SC
- 1996 : St Michel United FC
- 1997 : St Michel United FC
- 1998 : Red Star
- 1999 : St Michel United FC
- 2000 : St Michel United FC
- 2001 : Red Star
- 2002 : La Passe FC and St Michel United FC (shared title)
- 2003 : St Michel United FC
- 2004 : La Passe FC
- 2005 : La Passe FC
- 2006 : Anse Réunion FC
- 2007 : St Michel United FC
- 2008 : St Michel United FC
- 2009 : La Passe FC
- 2010 : St Michel United FC
- 2011 : St Michel United FC
- 2012 : St Michel United FC
- 2013 : Côte d'Or FC
- 2014 : St Michel United FC
- 2015 : St Michel United FC
- 2016 : Côte d'Or FC
- 2017 : Saint Louis Suns United
- 2018 : Côte d'Or FC
- 2019–20: Foresters
- 2020−21: Canceled
- 2022: La Passe FC
- 2023: Foresters
- 2024: Saint Louis Suns United
- 2025: Côte d'Or FC

== Performance by club ==
Club	City	Titles	Last title
Saint Louis Suns United (includes Saint-Louis FC and Sunshine SC)	Victoria	16	2024
St Michel United FC	Anse-aux-Pins	13	2015
La Passe FC	La Passe	5	2022
Côte d'Or FC	Praslin	4	2025
Foresters FC	Mont Fleuri	2	2023
Mont Fleuri FC	Victoria	2	1984
Red Star	Anse-aux-Pins	2	2001
Anse Réunion FC	Anse Réunion	1	2006

== Top goalscorers ==
Season	Goalscorer	Club	Goals
2003	(Seychelles) Philip Zialor	St Michel United	16
2006	(Seychelles) Yelvanny Rose	Anse Réunion	13
2008	(Seychelles) Philip Zialor	St Michel United	22
2009	(Seychelles) Philip Zialor	St Michel United	19
2010	(Seychelles) Wilnes Brutus	St Michel United	16
2011	(Seychelles) Yelvanny Rose	La Passe	11
2012	(Seychelles) Leroy Coralie	St Michel United	18
2016	(Seychelles) Leroy Coralie	St Michel United	25
2017	(Madagascar) Jocelyn Fenosoa	Red Star Defence Forces	17
2019−20	(Seychelles) Leroy Coralie	Foresters	16
2022−23	(Madagascar) Rivaldo Tahinjanahary	Bazar Brothers	20
2023−24	(Seychelles) Rennick Esther	Light Stars	15
2024−25	(Madagascar) Iavotriniaina Razafidratsimba	Anse Réunion	13
2025−26	(Madagascar) Elio Mbolatovo	Côte d'Oro	18

Most time goalscorers

- 3 times each.
  - Philip Zialor (2003, 2008 and 2009)
  - Leroy Coralie (2012, 2016 and 2019–20).

Most goals by a player in a single season

- 25 goals.
  - Leroy Coralie (2016).

== Multiple hat-tricks ==
Rank	Country	Player	Hat-tricks
1	(Seychelles)	Philip Zialor	5
2	(Seychelles)	Wilnes Brutus	2
2	(Seychelles)	Rennick Esther	2
2	(Seychelles)	Jonathan Mbanze	2
2	(Madagascar)	Pascal Razakanantenaina	2
6	(Seychelles)	Hamed Adrienne	1
6	(Seychelles)	Marcus Labiche	1
6	(Seychelles)	Nelson Laurence	1
6	(Seychelles)	Trevor Poiret	1
6	(Seychelles)	Mario Ravo	1
6	(Seychelles)	Asman Todisia	1

== 2023−24 Seychelles Premier League ==
Final standings:

#	Football club	W	D	L	Pts
1	Saint Louis Suns United	13	2	3	41
2	Foresters FC	10	5	3	35
3	Light Stars FC	9	4	5	31
4	La Passe FC	8	4	6	28
5	Saint Michel FC	7	5	6	26
6	Côte d'Or FC	7	3	8	24
7	Anse Réunion FC	6	2	10	20
8	PTL Bazar Brothers	4	7	7	19
9	Northern Dynamo	4	3	11	15
10	Defence Forces FC	2	5	11	11
