= Seychelles Football Federation =

CAF
- Short name: SFF
- Founded: 1941; 85 years ago
- Headquarters: Maison de Football
- Location: Mahé, Seychelles
- FIFA affiliation: 1986; 40 years ago
- CAF affiliation: 1986; 40 years ago
- COSAFA affiliation: 2000; 26 years ago
- President: Elvis Chetty
- Vice-President: Dolor Ernesta
- General Secretary: Denis Rose
- Website: seyfoot.com

The Seychelles Football Federation (SFF) is the governing body of football in the Seychelles. It was founded in 1941, and affiliated to FIFA and to CAF in 1986. It organizes the Seychelles First Division, the Seychelles FA Cup, the men's national team, and the women's national team.

The current president is Elvis Chetty.

== History ==
The Seychelles Football Association was formed in 1941 to oversee the running of competitions. The SFA’s referees’ commission was formed in 1953 and qualified referees were given certificates. Ahthime Hoareau was Seychelles’ first qualified referee in 1953 and he served on the referees’ commission for 30 years.

On 12 April 1970, Seychelles' first men's national team participated in a friendly tournament held in Kenya. The country’s first stadium, Stade Populaire, was built in the 1970s.

In 1980, Seychelles Football Association was renamed as the Seychelles Football Federation (SFF).

In 1986, the SFF became a member of the Fédération Internationale de Football Association (FIFA) and Confederation of African Football (CAF). The men's national team made their debut in the African Nations Cup in the same year.

In 1989, St Louis became the first team to represent Seychelles in African club competition. They exited in the first round of the African Champions Cup.

In 2022, the women's national team entered the FIFA/Coca-Cola Women's World Ranking for the first time under the Singaporean head coach Angeline Chua. For a team to be ranked on the FIFA list, the team has to play a minimum of six international matches against ranked teams. On 4 April 2022, the Seychelles women's national team played its sixth international match in Singapore.

On 11 September 2024, an agreement was signed by the managing director of Absa Bank Seychelles, Nazim Mahmood, and the chief executive of the Seychelles Football Federation, Dennis Rose. The two-year agreement will see Seychelles' top football division has been rebranded to Absa Premier League.

In 2025, with the support of the world football's governing body, Seychelles made history as the smallest nation ever to host a FIFA tournament as the first African nation to host the FIFA Beach Soccer World Cup.

== Organisation ==
The current members.

Position	Name
President	(Seychelles) Elvis Chetty
Vice President	(Seychelles) Dolor Ernesta
General Secretary	(Seychelles) Denis Rose
Treasurer	(Seychelles) Terry Chang-Tak Hue
Dispute Resolution Chamber - Member	(Seychelles) Elvis Chetty
Executive Committee Ordinary Member	(Seychelles) Carl Nalletamby
Executive Committee Ordinary Member	(Seychelles) Michael Delpech
Executive Committee Ordinary Member	(Seychelles) Philip Sinon
Executive Committee Ordinary Member	(Seychelles) Ralph Jean-Louis
Executive Committee Ordinary Member	(Seychelles) Lewis Madeleine
Executive Committee Ordinary Member	(Seychelles) Wilson Nancy
Media And Communication Manager	(Seychelles) Louis Nourrice
Technical Director	(France) Osama Haroun
National Coach - Men	(Seychelles) Ralph Jean-Louis
National Coach - Women	(Singapore) Chris Yip-Au
Chairperson of the Referees Committee	(Seychelles) Jason Damoo
Referee Coordinator	(Seychelles) Steve Marie
Futsal Coordinator	(Seychelles) Damien Jean

== See also ==
- Seychelles national football team
- Seychelles women's national football team
- Seychelles national beach soccer team
- Seychelles Premier League
- Seychelles Women's League
