= Côte d'Or FC =

- Full name: Côte d'Or Football Club
- Ground: Amitié Stadium; Praslin, Seychelles
- Capacity: 2,000
- Chairman: Louis Ésperance
- Manager: Christophe Brabançonne
- League: Seychelles League
- 2025–26: 2nd

Côte d'Or Football Club, is a football club based in Praslin, Seychelles. It currently plays in Seychelles League. In 2013, the club has won the Seychelles League.

== Stadium ==
Currently the team plays at the 2,000 capacity Stade d’Amitié.

== Crest ==
Former logo

Present logo

== Achievements ==
- Seychelles League: 4

2013, 2016, 2018, 2024–25

== Performance in CAF competitions ==
- CAF Champions League: 2 appearances

2014 – Preliminary Round
2017 – Preliminary Round

- CAF Confederation Cup: 1 appearance

2015 – Preliminary Round
