= St Michel United FC =

Football team

St. Michel United FC
- Full name: Saint Michel United Football Club
- Founded: 1996
- Ground: Stade Linité; Roche Caiman, Seychelles
- Capacity: 10,000
- Chairman: Basil Soundy
- Manager: Ahmed Abdou
- League: Seychelles League
- 2024–2025: 7th
Home colours

Saint Michel United Football Club is a Seychelles based football club from Anse Aux Pins. The club was founded in 1996. They play in the Seychelles First Division. The club have been crowned champions of Seychelles on thirteen occasions.

== Achievements ==
- Seychelles League: 13

1996, 1997, 1999, 2000, 2002 (shared), 2003, 2007, 2008, 2010, 2011, 2012, 2014, 2015.

- Seychelles FA Cup: 11

1997, 1998, 2001, 2006, 2007, 2008, 2009, 2011, 2013, 2014, 2016.

- Seychelles League Cup: 5

2004, 2008, 2009, 2010, 2011.

- Seychelles Presidents Cup: 11

1996, 1997, 1998, 2000, 2001, 2006, 2007, 2009, 2010, 2011.2017

== Performance in CAF competitions ==
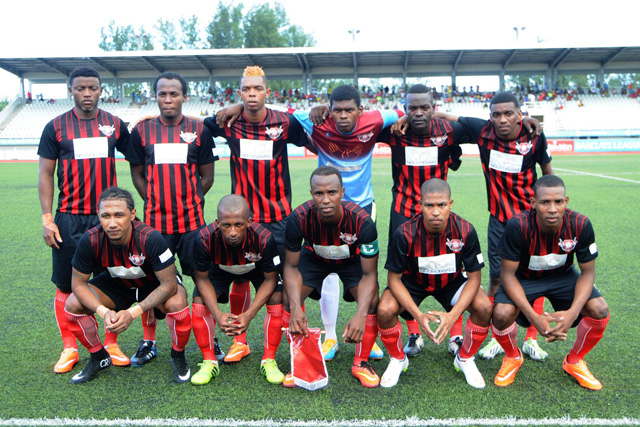
St Michel United team during the first match with Mamelodi Sundowns in the preliminary round of 2015 CAF Champions League

- CAF Champions League: 9 appearances

1997 – Preliminary Round
1998 – Preliminary Round
2000 – First Round
2001 – Second Round
2004 – First Round
2008 – Preliminary Round
2011 – Preliminary Round
2013 – Preliminary Round
2015 – Preliminary Round
2016 – Preliminary Round

- CAF Confederation Cup:

2017 – Preliminary Round

== Current players ==
Note: Flags indicate national team as defined under FIFA eligibility rules; some limited exceptions apply. Players may hold more than one non-FIFA nationality.

| No. | Pos. | Nation | Player |
|---|---|---|---|
| — | GK | SEY | Dennis Pierre |
| — | DF | SEY | Jacques Rémy |
| — | DF | SEY | Luc Corentin |
| — | DF | SEY | Godfred François |
| — | DF | SEY | Aurélien Rouanet |
| — | MF | SEY | Denzel Florentin |
| — | MF | SEY | Léopold Augustin |
| — | MF | SEY | Édouard Celestin |
| — | MF | SEY | Patrick Chatellier |
| — | DF | SEY | Anish Pillay |

| No. | Pos. | Nation | Player |
|---|---|---|---|
| — | GK | SEY | Gauthier Brabançonne |
| — | DF | SEY | Derrick Etienne |
| — | MF/FW | SEY | Nicolas Laporte |
| — | MF/DF | SEY | Richard Guy |
| — | MF | SEY | Nathan Aurélien |
| — | FW | SEY | Gaëtan Laurent |
| — | FW | SEY | Edgar Evariste |
| — | GK | SEY | Marcel Severin |
| — | DF | SEY | Achille Jean |
