= Mayotte national football team =

Regional association football team

Mayotte
- Nickname: Seahorses
- Association: Ligue de Football de Mayotte (LFM)
- Sub-confederation: UIOFF (Indian Ocean Islands)
- Head coach: Antoine Rasolofo
- Captain: Djardji Nadhoime
- Most caps: Abdou Lihariti Antoissi (15)
- Top scorer: Chamsidine Attoumani (6)
- Home stadium: Complexe de Kawani
First colours	Second colours

First international
- Mayotte 1–0 Madagascar (Mamoudzou, Mayotte; 1 April 2000)

Biggest win
- Unofficial; Mayotte 10–0 Saint Pierre and Miquelon (Franconville, France; 28 September 2010); Official; Mauritius 0–2 Mayotte (Curepipe, Mauritius; 29 July 2011); Mayotte 2–0 Réunion (Roche Caïman, Seychelles; 8 August 2011); Maldives 1–3 Mayotte (Saint-Benoît, Réunion; 31 July 2015); Mayotte 2–0 Comoros (Centre de Flacq, Mauritius; 8 July 2019); Mayotte 3–1 Maldives (Centre de Flacq, Mauritius; 22 July 2019); Seychelles 1–3 Mayotte (Centre de Flacq, Mauritius; 26 July 2019)

Biggest defeat
- Unofficial; Mayotte 1–6 Réunion (Franconville, France; 25 September 2008); Official; Madagascar 4–0 Mayotte (Antananarivo, Madagascar; 16 August 2007)

Coupe de l'Outre-Mer
- Appearances: 3 (first in 2008)
- Best result: Fourth place (2010, 2012)

Indian Ocean Island Games
- Appearances: 5 (first in 2007)
- Best result: Runners-up (2015)
Medal record
Men's Football
Indian Ocean Island Games
Bronze medal – third place	2007 Madagascar	Team
Silver medal – second place	2015 Réunion	Team
Bronze medal – third place	2019 Mauritius	Team

The Mayotte national football team represents the French overseas department and region of Mayotte in international football.

Mayotte is a member of neither FIFA nor CAF, so it is not eligible to enter the World Cup or the African Cup of Nations.

== History ==
Between 2000–06, Mayotte had played two friendly matches against the French overseas island of Réunion and three against Madagascar.

In 2007, the team competed for the first time in the Indian Ocean Games, finishing in third position after losing against Madagascar in the semi-final and beating Mauritius in the third-place playoff after a penalty-shootout.

In 2012, the team in Coupe de l'Outre-Mer Beat Tahiti champions of OFC Nations Cup 3–1. also beat New Caledonia champions of Pacific Games and Runners-Up of OFC Nations Cup 2–0.

== Mayotte Football Achievements ==
=== Indian Ocean Island Games ===
Indian Ocean Island Games Record
Year	Round	Position	Pld	W	D*	L	GF	GA
(Réunion) 1979	Part of Comoros							
(Mauritius) 1985	Part of Comoros							
(Madagascar) 1990	Part of Comoros							
(Seychelles) 1993	Part of Comoros							
(Réunion) 1998	Part of Comoros							
(Mauritius) 2003	Part of Réunion							
(Madagascar) 2007	Third Place	3rd	4	2	0	2	3	7
(Seychelles) 2011	Fourth Place	4th	4	1	1	2	3	2
(Réunion) 2015	Runners-Up	2nd	5	3	1	1	8	6
(Mauritius) 2019	Third Place	3rd	5	3	0	2	8	4
(Madagascar) 2023	Group stage	5th	2	0	2	0	0	0
Total			20	9	4	7	22	19

=== Coupe de l'Outre-Mer ===
Coupe de l'Outre-Mer Record
Year	Round	Position	Pld	W	D	L	GF	GA
(France) 2008	5th Place Match	6th	3	0	0	3	5	13
(France) 2010	Third-place match	4th	4	1	1	2	13	8
(France) 2012	Third-place match	4th	4	2	0	2	5	5
Total			11	3	1	7	23	26

== Fixtures and results ==
1 April 2000 Friendly	Mayotte	1–0	Madagascar	Mamoudzou, Mayotte
				Stadium: Complexe de Kawani

21 January 2001 Friendly	Madagascar	1–0	Mayotte	Antananarivo, Madagascar
				Stadium: Mahamasina Stadium

16 August 2003 Friendly	Réunion	1–1	Mayotte	Saint-Denis, Réunion
				Stadium: Stade Jean-Ivoula

15 December 2006 Friendly	Réunion	3–1	Mayotte	Saint-Denis, Réunion
				Stadium: Stade Jean-Ivoula

19 July 2007 Friendly	Madagascar	2–2	Mayotte	Antananarivo, Madagascar
	Ramiadamanana 47'; Miradji 53'		Houdhouna 38'; Nadhoime 85'	Stadium: Mahamasina Stadium

10 August 2007 2007 Indian Ocean Island Games	Seychelles	2–1	Mayotte	Antananarivo, Madagascar
	Zialor 18'; Denis 27' (pen.)		Nadhoime 40' (pen.)	Stadium: Mahamasina Stadium

12 August 2007 2007 Indian Ocean Island Games	Mauritius	0–1	Mayotte	Antananarivo, Madagascar
			Houdhouna 55'	Stadium: Mahamasina Stadium

16 August 2007 2007 Indian Ocean Island Games	Madagascar	4–0	Mayotte	Antananarivo, Madagascar
	Ramiadamanana 13'; Voavy 61', 85'; Miradji 65'			Stadium: Mahamasina Stadium

18 August 2007 2007 Indian Ocean Island Games	Mauritius	1–1 (2–4 p)	Mayotte	Antananarivo, Madagascar
	Sophie 101'		Rafion 96'	Stadium: Mahamasina Stadium

25 September 2008 2008 Coupe de l'Outre-Mer	Mayotte	1–6	Réunion	Franconville, France
	Abdou 73'		Diallo 15', 55', 80'; Boesso 36', 87'; Farro 50'	Stadium: Stade Jean Rolland

28 September 2008 2008 Coupe de l'Outre-Mer	French Guiana	4–2	Mayotte	Bonneuil-sur-Marne, France
	Lecante (?); Martinon; Clothilde			Stadium: Complexe sportif Léo Lagrange

3 October 2008 2008 Coupe de l'Outre-Mer	New Caledonia	3–2	Mayotte	La Courneuve, France
	Wajoka 53', 87' (pen.); Kai 58'		Hamada 12'; Houmadi 50'	Stadium: Stade Marville; Referee: (Guadeloupe) Phillippe Touraine

22 June 2009 Friendly	Madagascar	2–0	Mayotte	Antananarivo, Madagascar
				Stadium: Mahamasina Stadium

12 July 2009 Friendly	Mayotte	2–2	Madagascar	Mamoudzou, Mayotte
	Ben Ahmed 75', 90'		Rakotondramanana 13'; Tsaralaza 29'	Stadium: Complexe de Kawani

20 August 2010 Friendly	Madagascar	0–0	Mayotte	Antananarivo, Madagascar
				Stadium: Mahamasina Stadium

22 September 2010 2010 Coupe de l'Outre-Mer	French Guiana	2–2 (2–4 p)	Mayotte	Saint-Gratien, Val-d'Oise, France
23:00 UTC+3	Tuinfort 47', 85'		Filomar 25'; Ramia 33'	Stadium: Stade Michel Hidalgo; Referee: (France) Bruno Fouquet

25 September 2010 2010 Coupe de l'Outre-Mer	Mayotte	1–2	Réunion	Gennevilliers, Hauts de Seine, France
17:00 UTC+3	Bamana 5'		Elcaman 48'; Boulard 54'	Stadium: Parc des Sports Louis Boury; Referee: (France) Guy Prevot

28 September 2010 2010 Coupe de l'Outre-Mer	Mayotte	10–0	Saint Pierre and Miquelon	Franconville, Val d'Oise, France
22:00 UTC+3	N'Daka 14', 47', 72', 84'; Antoissi 25', 59', 81'; Ibrahim 40', 44'; Bourahima 67'			Stadium: Stade Jean Rolland; Referee: (France) Stephane Tetauira

1 October 2010 2010 Coupe de l'Outre-Mer	Mayotte	0–4	Guadeloupe	Saint-Ouen, Seine-Saint-Denis, France
22:00 UTC+3			Gotin 11', 24', 47'; Gomez 25'	Stadium: Stade Bauer; Referee: (France) David Hoarau

29 July 2011 Friendly	Mauritius	0–2	Mayotte	Curepipe, Mauritius
				Stadium: Stade George V

4 August 2011 2011 Indian Ocean Island Games	Madagascar	1–1	Mayotte	Praslin, Seychelles
18:30 UTC+3	Rajoarimanana 36'		Soihirin 42'	Stadium: Stade d'Amitié; Attendance: 1,800; Referee: (Seychelles) Bernard Camille

8 August 2011 2011 Indian Ocean Island Games	Mayotte	2–0	Réunion	Roche Caïman, Mahé, Seychelles
15:00 UTC+3	Yazidou 56'; Antoissi 78'			Stadium: Stade Linité; Attendance: 1,000; Referee: (Comoros) Ali Adelaïd

11 August 2011 2011 Indian Ocean Island Games	Mayotte	0–0 (4–5 p)	Mauritius	Roche Caïman, Mahé, Seychelles
17:30 UTC+3				Stadium: Stade Linité; Attendance: 2,500; Referee: (Comoros) Ali Adelaïd
	Penalties
	Mihidjai (penalty scored); Souffou (penalty missed); Rasolofonirina (penalty scored); Ben-Hamadi (penalty scored); Djadid (penalty scored)		(penalty scored) Veeranah; (penalty scored) Cundasamy; (penalty scored) Sophie; (penalty scored) Ravina; (penalty scored) Bell

13 August 2011 2011 Indian Ocean Island Games	Réunion	1–0	Mayotte	Roche Caïman, Mahé, Seychelles
14:00 UTC+3	El Madaghri 74'			Stadium: Stade Linité; Attendance: 3,000; Referee: (Madagascar) Jean-Pierre Rakotonjanahary

22 September 2012 2012 Coupe de l'Outre-Mer	Tahiti	1–3	Mayotte	Issy-les-Moulineaux, France
17:00 UTC+3	Degage 84'		Attoumani 29', 45', 59'	Stadium: Stade Jean-Bouin; Referee: (Guadeloupe) Steeve Zabeau

24 September 2012 2012 Coupe de l'Outre-Mer	New Caledonia	0–2	Mayotte	Corbeil-Essonnes, France
20:30 UTC+3			Attoumani 73', 90'	Stadium: Complexe Sportif Léo Lagrange; Referee: (French Guiana) Guy Prevot

26 September 2012 2012 Coupe de l'Outre-Mer	Martinique	3–0	Mayotte	Saint-Ouen-l'Aumône, France
19:00 UTC+3	Parsemain 29'; Tresfield 32'; Abaul 48'			Stadium: Parc des Sports; Referee: (Réunion) Marius Quenet

29 September 2012 2012 Coupe de l'Outre-Mer	Guadeloupe	1–0	Mayotte	Saint-Gratien, France
17:00 UTC+3	Pascal 74'			Stadium: Stade de Michel Hidalgo; Referee: (Réunion) Marius Quenet

31 July 2015 2015 Indian Ocean Island Games	Maldives	1–3	Mayotte	Saint-Benoît, Réunion, Réunion
	Umair 12'		Ben Yahaya 54'; Rasolofo 83'; Noussoura 88'	Stadium: Stade Jean-Allane; Referee: (Mauritius) Dharamveer Hurbungs

2 August 2015 2015 Indian Ocean Island Games	Mayotte	1–1	Madagascar	Saint-Pierre, Réunion, Réunion
	Faya 28'		Vombola 77'	Stadium: Stade Michel Volnay; Referee: (Réunion) Steeve Dubec

4 August 2015 2015 Indian Ocean Island Games	Seychelles	0–1	Mayotte	Saint-Pierre, Réunion, Réunion
			Rasolofo 66' (pen.)	Stadium: Stade Michel Volnay; Referee: (Réunion) Didier Ringuin

6 August 2015 2015 Indian Ocean Island Games	Mayotte	2–1	Mauritius	Saint-Denis, Réunion, Réunion
	Ben Yahaya 61'; Kamal 68'		Sophie 55'	Stadium: Stade Jean-Ivoula; Referee: (Réunion) Steeve Dubec

8 August 2015 2015 Indian Ocean Island Games	Mayotte	1–3	Réunion	Saint-Denis, Réunion, Réunion
	Attoumani 90+1'		Fontaine 7', 17'; Boesso 67'	Stadium: Stade Jean-Ivoula; Referee: (Madagascar) Adboul Kanoso

8 July 2019 2019 Indian Ocean Island Games	Mayotte	2–0	Comoros	Centre de Flacq, Mauritius
	Ben Djadid 50'; Mouhtar 83'			Stadium: Stade Auguste Vollaire

20 July 2019 2019 Indian Ocean Island Games	Réunion	1–0	Mayotte	Curepipe, Mauritius
	Assoumani 77'			Stadium: Stade George V

22 July 2019 2019 Indian Ocean Island Games	Mayotte	3–1	Maldives	Centre de Flacq, Mauritius
	Habib 14'; Ben Yahaya 26'; Mouritaza 56'		Naim 22'	Stadium: Stade Auguste Vollaire

24 July 2019 2019 Indian Ocean Island Games	Mauritius	1–0	Mayotte	Curepipe, Mauritius
	Perticots 117'			Stadium: Stade George V

26 July 2019 2019 Indian Ocean Island Games	Seychelles	1–3	Mayotte	Centre de Flacq, Mauritius
	Damoo 34'		Rasolofonirina 22'; Ben Yahaya 74', 83'	Stadium: Stade Auguste Vollaire

30 July 2023 Friendly	Madagascar	3–1	Mayotte	Madagascar

24 August 2023 2023 Indian Ocean Island Games	Mayotte	0–0	Comoros	Antananarivo, Madagascar
				Stadium: Elgeco Plus Stadium

26 August 2023 2023 Indian Ocean Island Games	Réunion	0–0	Mayotte	Antananarivo, Madagascar
				Stadium: Elgeco Plus Stadium

== Head-to-Head Records against other countries ==
As of 11 August 2019

Opponent	G	W	D	L	GF	GA	GD
Madagascar	9	1	5	3	7	13	–6
Réunion	8	1	1	6	7	17	–10
Mauritius	6	3	2	1	6	3	3
Seychelles	3	2	0	1	5	3	2
Maldives	2	2	0	0	6	2	4
New Caledonia	2	1	0	1	4	3	1
French Guiana	2	0	1	1	4	6	–2
Guadeloupe	2	0	0	2	0	5	–5
Saint Pierre and Miquelon	1	1	0	0	10	0	10
Tahiti	1	1	0	0	3	1	2
Comoros	1	1	0	0	2	0	2
Martinique	1	0	0	1	0	3	–3
12 Countries	38	13	9	16	54	56	−2

== Team ==
=== Current squad ===
The following The players were selected to the squad for the 2019 Indian Ocean Island Games:

No.	Pos.	Player	Date of birth (age)	Caps	Goals	Club
1	GK	Attoumani Hanafi	28 November 1995 (age 30)	3	0	(Ligue mahoraise de football) UCS Sada
99	GK	Mickaël Salim	27 April 1995 (age 31)	4	0	(Ligue mahoraise de football) FC Mtsapéré
2	DF	Ahmed Faissoil	28 April 1990 (age 36)	5	0	(Ligue réunionnaise de football) AJ Petite-Île
4	DF	Abdou Said Raffion	28 November 1996 (age 29)	8	1	(Ligue mahoraise de football) Jumeaux Mzouazia
5	DF	Boinali Said Dine	28 November 1997 (age 28)	5	0	(Ligue réunionnaise de football) US Sainte-Marienne
9	DF	Soilihi Faydine	28 November 1998 (age 27)	4	0	(Ligue réunionnaise de football) US Sainte-Marienne
12	DF	Ali Abdou Abdallah	4 April 2000 (age 26)	1	0	(Ligue mahoraise de football) Jumeaux Mzouazia
7	MF	Adifane Noussoura	15 June 1992 (age 34)	5	0	(Ligue mahoraise de football) Tchanga SC
13	MF	Maoulida Habib	4 April 1999 (age 27)	5	1	(Ligue réunionnaise de football) SS Saint-Louisienne
14	MF	Ridjali Souffou	8 June 1992 (age 34)	5	0	(Ligue mahoraise de football) FC Mtsapéré
15	MF	Houmadi Mouritaza		2	1	(Ligue réunionnaise de football) US Sainte-Marienne
17	MF	Ansar Ben Combo	19 March 1995 (age 31)	2	0	(French Football Federation) Avoine OCC
22	MF	Laurent Garcia		3	0	(Ligue mahoraise de football) Abeilles M'tsamboro
54	MF	Kamal Ben Djadid	2 June 1986 (age 40)	7	2	(Ligue mahoraise de football) Jumeaux Mzouazia
0	FW	Moudhoihirou Ben Yahaya	18 April 1990 (age 36)	11	4	(Ligue réunionnaise de football) US Sainte-Marienne
3	FW	Chamsidine Attoumani		10	6	(Ligue mahoraise de football) UCS Sada
23	FW	Antoine Rasolofonirina	2 January 1982 (age 44)	13	1	(Ligue réunionnaise de football) Saint-Pauloise FC
31	FW	Antoissi Loutoufi	28 November 1987 (age 38)	5	0	(Ligue mahoraise de football) Jumeaux Mzouazia
101	FW	Madi Ali Mouhtar		3	1	(Ligue mahoraise de football) FC Mtsapéré

== Notable players ==
- (Mayotte) Adifane Noussoura – played for professional team Lincoln City (England)

== Honours ==
=== Regional ===
- Indian Ocean Island Games
  - Silver Medal (1): 2015
  - Bronze Medal (2): 2007, 2019
