= Football at the 2007 Indian Ocean Island Games =

2007 Football at the Indian Ocean Island Games
Jeux des îles de l'océan Indien (French)

Tournament details
- Host country: Madagascar
- City: Antananarivo
- Teams: 6 (from 1 confederation)
- Venue: 1 (in 1 host city)

Final positions
- Champions: Réunion (3rd title)
- Runners-up: Madagascar
- Third place: Mayotte

Tournament statistics
- Matches played: 10
- Goals scored: 19 (1.9 per match)
- Top scorer: (Madagascar) Paulin Voavy (4 goals)

The men's association football tournament at the 2007 Indian Ocean Island Games (French: Jeux des îles de l'océan Indien 2007) held in Madagascar at Mahamasina Stadium in Antananarivo.

== Group stage ==
=== Group A ===
Pos	Team	Pld	W	D	L	GF	GA	GD	Pts	Qualification
1	Mauritius	2	1	0	1	3	1	+2	3	Advance to knockout stage
2	Mayotte	2	1	0	1	2	2	0	3	Advance to knockout stage
3	Seychelles	2	1	0	1	2	4	−2	3	

Source: IOCS
Rules for classification: Tie-breaking criteria
10 August 2007

Seychelles	2–1	Mayotte
Philip Zialor 18'; Godfrey Denis 27' (pen.)		Djardji Nadhoime 40' (pen.)

Mahamasina Stadium, Antananarivo, Madagascar

12 August 2007

Mauritius	0–1	Mayotte
		Assani Houdhouna 55'

Mahamasina Stadium, Antananarivo, Madagascar

14 August 2007

Mauritius	3–0	Seychelles
Giovanni Jeannot 2', 64'; Kersley Appou 40'

Mahamasina Stadium, Antananarivo, Madagascar

=== Group B ===
Pos	Team	Pld	W	D	L	GF	GA	GD	Pts	Qualification
1	Madagascar (H)	2	1	1	0	3	0	+3	4	Advance to knockout stage
2	Réunion	2	0	2	0	1	1	0	2	Advance to knockout stage
3	Comoros	2	0	1	1	1	4	−3	1	

Source: IOCS
Rules for classification: Tie-breaking criteria
(H) Hosts
10 August 2007

Comoros	1–1	Réunion
Kassim Abdallah 35'		Sall Malick 52'

Mahamasina Stadium, Antananarivo, Madagascar
Attendance: 9,000

12 August 2007

Madagascar	0–0	Réunion

Mahamasina Stadium, Antananarivo, Madagascar

14 August 2007

Madagascar	3–0	Comoros
Paulin Voavy 70', 89'; Claudio Ramiadamanana 90'

Mahamasina Stadium, Antananarivo, Madagascar

== Knockout stage ==
Semi-finals
16 August, Antananarivo
Mauritius	0
Réunion	1
16 August, Antananarivo
Madagascar	4
Mayotte	0

Final
18 August, Antananarivo
Réunion	0 (7)
Madagascar	0 (6)
Third place
18 August, Antananarivo
Mauritius	1 (2)
Mayotte	1 (4)

=== Semi-final ===
16 August 2007

Mauritius	0–1	Réunion
		Eric Farro 96'

Mahamasina Stadium, Antananarivo, Madagascar

16 August 2007

Madagascar	4–0	Mayotte
Claudio Ramiadamanana 13'; Paulin Voavy 61', 85'; Mario Miradji 65'

Mahamasina Stadium, Antananarivo, Madagascar

=== Third place match ===
18 August 2007

Mauritius	1–1 (2–4 pen.)	Mayotte
Andy Sophie 101'		Abdou Rafion 96'

Mahamasina Stadium, Antananarivo, Madagascar

=== Final ===
18 August 2007

Réunion	0–0 (7–6 pen.)	Madagascar

Mahamasina Stadium, Antananarivo, Madagascar

== Top scorers ==
Name		Goals
1.	(Madagascar) Paulin Voavy	4
2.	(Mauritius) Giovanni Jeannot	2
	(Madagascar) Claudio Ramiadamanana	2

== Final ranking ==
Pos	Team	Pld	W	D	L	GF	GA	GD	Pts	Final result
1	Réunion	4	1	3	0	2	1	+1	6	Champions
2	Madagascar (H)	4	2	2	0	7	0	+7	8	Runners-up
3	Mayotte	4	1	1	2	3	7	−4	4	Third place
4	Mauritius	4	1	1	2	4	3	+1	4	Fourth place
5	Seychelles	2	1	0	1	2	4	−2	3	Eliminated in Group stage
6	Comoros	2	0	1	1	1	4	−3	1	Eliminated in Group stage

Source: IOCS
(H) Hosts

Per statistical convention in football, matches decided in extra time are counted as wins and losses, while matches decided by penalty shoot-out are counted as draws.

== See also ==
- Indian Ocean Island Games
- Football at the Indian Ocean Island Games
