= 2010 Coupe de l'Outre-Mer =

Tournament details
- Host country: France
- Dates: 22 September – 2 October
- Teams: 8 (from 3 confederations)
- Venue: 10 (in 5 host cities)

Final positions
- Champions: Martinique (1st title)
- Runners-up: Réunion
- Third place: Guadeloupe
- Fourth place: Mayotte

Tournament statistics
- Matches played: 14
- Goals scored: 57 (4.07 per match)
- Top scorer(s): (Martinique) Patrick Percin (Mayotte) El Habib N'Daka (Guadeloupe) Ludovic Gotin (4 goals)

La Coupe de l'Outre-Mer de football 2010 (English: The 2010 Overseas Football Cup) was the second edition of the Coupe de l'Outre-Mer. The competition took place from 22 September 2010 to 2 October 2010 in Île-de-France, France.

Eight teams entered the second edition of the competition. The final was played at the Stade Dominique Duvauchelle in Créteil, Val de Marne and was contested by Réunion and Martinique in a replay of the 2008 final. No goals were scored in the final before Martinique won 5–3 in a penalty shoot-out.

The tournament marked the first appearance of the Saint Pierre and Miquelon national football team.

== Background ==
The Tournoi des Champions Antilles-Guyane was the first football competition played by club teams from the overseas departments and territories of France. It was contested by teams from French Guiana, Guadeloupe and Martinique and began in 1963. The Coupe D.O.M. and Coupe T.O.M were later introduced and the winners of each would play off against each other in the Coupe des Clubs Champions de l'Outre-Mer.

In 2008, the Coupe de l'Outre-Mer was introduced for the representative teams of the overseas departments and territories as a replacement for the Coupe des Clubs Champions de l'Outre-Mer.

In the inaugural edition, Réunion defeated Martinique 1–0 in the final.

Saint Pierre and Miquelon had never played before.

== Format ==
Eight teams took part in the competition. They were drawn into two single round robin groups of four teams. Unusually, four points were awarded for a win rather than three. Drawn matches in the group stage would end in a penalty shootout for a bonus point. The winning team from each group would contest the final, the runners-up would contest the third-place match.

=== Venues ===
- Parc des Sports Louis Boury - Gennevilliers, Hauts de Seine
- Parc des Sports des Maisons Rouges - Bry-sur-Marne, Val-de-Marne
- Stade Bauer - Saint-Ouen, Seine-Saint-Denis
- Stade Dominique Duvauchelle - Créteil, Val-de-Marne
- Stade Georges Pompidou - Villemomble, Seine-Saint-Denis
- Stade Henri-Longuet - Viry-Châtillon, Essonne
- Stade Jean Rolland - Franconville, Val d'Oise
- Stade Louison Bobet - Le Plessis-Trévise, Val de Marne
- Stade Langrenay - Longjumeau, Essonne
- Stade Michel Hidalgo - Saint-Gratien, Val-d'Oise

=== Participants ===
- Guadeloupe
- Martinique
- French Guiana
- Réunion
- Mayotte
- New Caledonia
- Saint Pierre and Miquelon
- Tahiti

=== Teams that did not compete ===
- Wallis and Futuna
- Saint Martin
- Saint Barthélemy

== Group stage ==
=== Group A ===
Réunion won all three of their matches to progress to the final.

Team	Pld	W	WP	LP	L	GF	GA	GD	Pts
Réunion	3	3	0	0	0	14	1	+13	12
Mayotte	3	1	1	0	1	13	4	+9	6
French Guiana	3	1	0	1	1	9	3	+6	5
Saint Pierre and Miquelon	3	0	0	0	3	0	28	–28	0

22 September 2010
18:30 UTC+1

Réunion	11–0	Saint Pierre and Miquelon
Fontaine 25'; Gastrin 31'; N’Gongué 57'; Farro 59', 88'; Mounoussamy 60'; Basquaise 65', 76'; Visnelda 74', 89', 90+2'	(Report)

Stade Michel Hidalgo, Saint-Gratien, Val-d'Oise
Referee: (France) Harry Douglas
22 September 2010
21:00 UTC+1

French Guiana	2–2	Mayotte
Tuinfort 47', 85'	(Report)	Filomar 25'; Ramia 33'
Penalties
	2 – 4

Stade Michel Hidalgo, Saint-Gratien, Val-d'Oise
Referee: (France) Bruno Fouquet

25 September 2010
15:00 UTC+1

Mayotte	1–2	Réunion
Bamana 5'	(Report)	Elcaman 48'; Boulard 54'

Parc des Sports Louis Boury, Gennevilliers, Hauts de Seine
Referee: (France) Guy Prevot
25 September 2010
17:30 UTC+1

French Guiana	7–0	Saint Pierre and Miquelon
Yenoumou 10', 57'; Evens 25'; Nalie 27', 90'; Habran 67', 83'	(Report)

Parc des Sports Louis Boury, Gennevilliers, Hauts de Seine
Referee: (France) David Hoarau

28 September 2010
20:00 UTC+1

French Guiana	0–1	Réunion
	(Report)	Gastrin 5'

Stade Georges Pompidou, Villemomble, Seine-Saint-Denis
Referee: (France) Harry Douglas
28 September 2010
20:00 UTC+1

Mayotte	10–0	Saint Pierre and Miquelon
N'Daka 14', 47', 72', 84'; Antoissi 25', 59', 81'; Ibrahim 40', 44'; Bourahima 67'	(Report)

Stade Jean Rolland, Franconville, Val d'Oise
Referee: (France) Stephane Tetauira

=== Group B ===
Martinique won their group to progress to the final.

Team	Pld	W	WP	LP	L	GF	GA	GD	Pts
Martinique	3	2	0	0	1	8	3	+5	8
Guadeloupe	3	1	0	2	0	4	2	+2	6
Tahiti	3	0	2	0	1	3	6	–3	4
New Caledonia	3	0	1	1	1	2	6	–4	3

23 September 2010
18:30 UTC+1

Martinique	4–1	Tahiti
Audel 44'; Percin 48', 82'; Parsemain 60'	(Report)	Li Fung Kuee 27'

Parc des Sports des Maisons Rouges, Bry-sur-Marne, Val-de-Marne
Referee: (France) Stephane Panont
23 September 2010
21:00 UTC+1

Guadeloupe	1–1	New Caledonia
Lambourde 74'	(Report)	Hmaé 68'
Penalties
	5–6

Parc des Sports des Maisons Rouges, Bry-sur-Marne, Val-de-Marne
Referee: (France) Guy Prevot

26 September 2010
15:00 UTC+1

New Caledonia	0–4	Martinique
	(Report)	Percin 41', 90+2'; Gustan 51'; Vitulin 57'

Stade Henri-Longuet, Viry-Châtillon, Essonne
Referee: (France) Stephane Tetauira
26 September 2010
17:30 UTC+1

Guadeloupe	1–1	Tahiti
Gotin 67'	(Report)	Tehau 57'
Penalties
	2–4

Stade Henri-Longuet, Viry-Châtillon, Essonne
Referee: (France) Bruno Fouquet

29 September 2010
20:00 UTC+1

Guadeloupe	2–0	Martinique
Lambourde 20'; Moka 90+3'	(Report)

Stade Louison Bobet, Le Plessis-Trévise, Val de Marne
Referee: (France) David Hoarau
29 September 2010
20:00 UTC+1

New Caledonia	1–1	Tahiti
Watrone 6'	(Report)	Williams 30'
Penalties
	3–5

Stade Langrenay, Longjumeau, Essonne
Referee: (France) Bruno Fouquet

== Third-place match ==
Guadeloupe defeated Mayotte in the third-place match.

1 October 2010
20:00 UTC+1

Mayotte	0–4	Guadeloupe
	(Report)	Gotin 11', 24', 47'; Gomez 25'

Stade Bauer, Saint-Ouen, Seine-Saint-Denis
Referee: (France) David Hoarau

== Final ==
Martinique defeated Réunion in the final.

2 October 2010
17:00 UTC+1

Réunion	0–0	Martinique
	(Report)
Penalties
	3–5

Stade Dominique Duvauchelle, Créteil, Val-de-Marne
Referee: (France) Jean Charles Cailleux
