= Philip Zialor =

Seychellois footballer

Personal information
- Full name: Philip George Zialor
- Date of birth: 6 September 1976 (age 50)
- Position: Forward

Senior career*
Years	Team	Apps	(Gls)
2000–2004	St Michel United FC		(16+)
2005–2006	Saint Louis FC		(5)
2007–2009	St Michel United FC		(41)
2009–2011	Anse Réunion FC		(7+)
Total			(63+)

International career
1998–2009	Seychelles	33	(14)
- * Club domestic league appearances and goals

Philip Zialor (born September 6, 1976) is a Seychellois former professional footballer who played as a striker.

Zialor holds national records as the Seychelles national team top scorer (with 14) and most in a single game, netting four against Mauritius in the 2008 COSAFA Cup. He also scored two of his team's four goals in the 2010 World Cup qualifying matches.

== International goals ==
Scores and results list Seychelles' goal tally first, score column indicates score after each Seychelles goal.

No.	Date	Venue	Opponent	Score	Result	Competition	Ref.
1	15 August 1998	Stade Linité, Victoria, Seychelles	Mauritius	4–2	4–3	1998 Indian Ocean Island Games	
2	8 April 2000	Stade Linité, Victoria, Seychelles	Namibia	1–1	1–1	2002 FIFA World Cup qualification	
3	30 March 2003	National Sports Stadium, Harare, Zimbabwe	Zimbabwe	1–2	1–3	2004 Africa Cup of Nations qualification	
4	7 June 2003	Stade Linité, Victoria, Seychelles	Zimbabwe	1–0	2–1	2004 Africa Cup of Nations qualification	
5	30 June 2006	People's Stadium, Victoria, Seychelles	Tanzania	2–1	2–1	Friendly	
6	24 April 2007	Stade Linité, Victoria, Seychelles	Réunion	2–0	2–0	Friendly	
7	14 August 2007	Mahamasina Municipal Stadium, Antananarivo, Madagascar	Mayotte	1–0	2–1	2007 Indian Ocean Island Games	
8	14 June 2008	Stade Linité, Victoria, Seychelles	Burkina Faso	1–1	2–3	2010 FIFA World Cup qualification	
9	19 July 2008	Witbank Stadium, Witbank, South Africa	Mauritius	2–0	7–0	2008 COSAFA Cup	
10	19 July 2008	Witbank Stadium, Witbank, South Africa	Mauritius	3–0	7–0	2008 COSAFA Cup	
11	19 July 2008	Witbank Stadium, Witbank, South Africa	Mauritius	4–0	7–0	2008 COSAFA Cup	
12	19 July 2008	Witbank Stadium, Witbank, South Africa	Mauritius	7–0	7–0	2008 COSAFA Cup	
13	6 September 2008	Stade Linité, Victoria, Seychelles	Burundi	1–2	1–2	2010 FIFA World Cup qualification	
