= Claudio Ramiadamanana =

Malagasy footballer (born 1988)

Personal information
- Date of birth: 22 October 1988 (age 38)
- Place of birth: Antananarivo, Madagascar
- Height: 1.68 m (5 ft 6 in)
- Position: Striker

Youth career
- Academie Ny Antsika

Senior career*
Years	Team	Apps	(Gls)
2006–2007	Academie Ny Antsika	32	(20)
2008	Muangthong United	16	(11)
2008–2010	Romorantin	27	(8)
2010–2011	Orléans	5	(0)
2011–2012	Romorantin	20	(12)
2012–2013	Paris FC	5	(1)
2014	Bourges 18	2	(0)
2014	Saint-Pierroise		
2014–2015	La Roche	21	(6)
2015–2017	Chartres	26	(4)
2017	AS Excelsior		
2018	Pacy Ménilles		

International career
2007–2018	Madagascar	16	(3)
- * Club domestic league appearances and goals

Claudio Ramiadamanana (born 22 October 1988) is a Malagasy professional footballer who plays as a striker. He played for the Madagascar national team from 2007 to 2018, scoring three goals in sixteen matches.

== Club career ==
Ramiadamanana left the Academie Ny Antsika in January 2008 and moved to Mueang Thong NongJork United in the Thailand Division 1 League. He left Thailand in July and moved to Romorantin in the Championnat National. In 2012, he joined Paris FC, playing five games and scoring one goal.

== International career ==
Ramiadamanana played with Madagascar by the 2007 COSAFA Cup.

=== International goals ===
List of international goals scored by Claudio Ramiadamanana
No.	Date	Venue	Opponent	Score	Result	Competition
1.	29 April 2007	Estádio da Machava, Maputo, Mozambique	Seychelles	0–4	0–5	2007 COSAFA Cup
2.	19 July 2007	Mahamasina Municipal Stadium, Antananarivo	Mayotte	1–1	2–2	Friendly
3.	16 August 2007	Mahamasina Municipal Stadium, Antananarivo	Mayotte	1–0	4–0	2007 Indian Ocean Island Games

== Honours ==
Muangthong United

- Thailand League Division 1: 2008

International

- COSAFA CUP U20: COSAFA U-20 Challenge Cup 2005
- best player of the tournament COSAFA U-20 Challenge Cup 2005
- Football at the Indian Ocean Island Games silver medal: 2007
