= Sarivahy Vombola =

Malagasy footballer

Personal information
- Full name: Sarivahy Jeannot Claude Bernard Vombola
- Date of birth: 13 September 1988 (age 38)
- Position: Forward

Team information
- Current team: Yeni Amasyaspor

Senior career*
Years	Team	Apps	(Gls)
2009–2010	Nantes B		
2010–2016	CNaPS Sport		
2016–	Yeni Amasyaspor		

International career^{‡}
2011–	Madagascar	30	(8)
- * Club domestic league appearances and goals ‡ National team caps and goals as of 21 March 2017

Sarivahy Vombola is a Malagasy international footballer who plays for Yeni Amasyaspor in Turkey.

He was the top scorer in the 2015 COSAFA Cup with five goals in five games. Despite that, Vombola has never reselected by Nicolas Dupuis for returning in the national team.

== International career ==
=== International goals ===
Scores and results list Madagascar's goal tally first.

No	Date	Venue	Opponent	Score	Result	Competition
1.	18 May 2015	Royal Bafokeng Stadium, Phokeng, South Africa	Lesotho	1–1	1–2	2015 COSAFA Cup
2.	28 May 2015	Moruleng Stadium, Saulspoort, South Africa	Namibia	1–1	2–3	2015 COSAFA Cup
3.	28 May 2015	Moruleng Stadium, Saulspoort, South Africa	Namibia	1–2	2–3	2015 COSAFA Cup
4.	30 May 2015	Moruleng Stadium, Saulspoort, South Africa	Botswana	0–1	1–2	2015 COSAFA Cup
5.	30 May 2015	Moruleng Stadium, Saulspoort, South Africa	Botswana	0–2	1–2	2015 COSAFA Cup
6.	14 June 2015	Stade Tata Raphaël, Kinshasa, DR Congo	DR Congo	2–1	2–1	2017 Africa Cup of Nations qualification
7.	2 August 2015	Stade Michel Volnay, Saint-Pierre, Réunion	Mayotte	1–1	1–1	2015 Indian Ocean Island Games
8.	4 August 2015	Stade Michel Volnay, Saint-Pierre, Réunion	Maldives	0–4	0–4	2015 Indian Ocean Island Games

== Honours ==
=== Club ===
CNaPS Sport

- THB Champions League (4): 2013, 2014, 2015, 2016
- Coupe de Madagascar (3): 2011, 2015, 2016

=== National team ===
- COSAFA Cup third place: 2015
- Top scorer COSAFA Cup (1) : 2015
