= Football at the 1979 Indian Ocean Island Games =

Tournament details
- Host country: Réunion
- Dates: August 26, 1979 - September 1, 1979
- Teams: 5 (from 2 confederations)

Final positions
- Champions: Réunion (1st title)
- Runners-up: Seychelles
- Third place: Comoros

Tournament statistics
- Matches played: 10
- Goals scored: 43 (4.3 per match)

The 1st edition of the 1979 Indian Ocean Games were held in Réunion. Réunion were the champions, beating Seychelles in the final 2-1.

All games were played at the Stade Michel Volnay in St-Pierre, Réunion.

== Group stage ==
=== Group A ===
Pos	Team	Pld	W	D	L	GF	GA	GD	Pts	Qualification
1	Réunion (H)	2	2	0	0	12	0	+12	6	Advance to knockout stage
2	Seychelles	2	1	0	1	9	3	+6	3	Advance to knockout stage
3	Maldives	2	0	0	2	0	18	−18	0	Advance to qualification play off

Source: IOCS
Rules for classification: Tie-breaking criteria
(H) Hosts
August 26, 1979

Réunion	3−0	Seychelles

Stade Michel Volnay, Réunion

August 27, 1979

Seychelles	9−0	Maldives

Stade Michel Volnay, Réunion

August 28, 1979

Réunion	9−0	Maldives

Stade Michel Volnay, Réunion

=== Group B ===
Pos	Team	Pld	W	D	L	GF	GA	GD	Pts	Qualification
1	Mauritius	2	2	0	0	6	1	+5	6	Advance to knockout stage
2	Comoros	2	0	0	2	1	6	−5	0	Advance to qualification play off

Source: IOCS
Rules for classification: Tie-breaking criteria
August 26, 1979

Mauritius	3−0	Comoros
L'Enflé ?

Stade Michel Volnay, Réunion

August 28, 1979

Comoros	1−3	Mauritius
		Jacquotte; Noël

Stade Michel Volnay, Réunion

== Knockout stage ==
Qualification Play Off
29 August — Saint-Pierre
Comoros	2
Maldives	1

Semifinals
31 August — Saint-Pierre
Réunion	6
Comoros	1
31 August — Saint-Pierre
Mauritius	1 (2)
Seychelles (p)	1 (4)

Final
1 September — Saint-Pierre
Réunion	2
Seychelles	1
Third place
1 September — Saint-Pierre
Comoros (w/o)	3
Mauritius	0

=== Qualification Play Off ===
August 29, 1979

Comoros	2–1	Maldives

Stade Michel Volnay, Réunion

=== Semifinals ===
August 31, 1979

Seychelles	1–1	Mauritius
		L'Enflé
Penalties
	4–2

Stade Michel Volnay, Réunion

August 31, 1979

Réunion	6–1	Comoros

Stade Michel Volnay, Réunion

=== Third place match ===
September 1, 1979

Comoros	3–0^{1}	Mauritius

Stade Michel Volnay, Réunion

^{1} The match was forfeited and Comoros were awarded third-place as Mauritius were unable to travel to Réunion for the match.

=== Final ===
September 1, 1979

Réunion	2–1	Seychelles

Stade Michel Volnay, Réunion

Indian Ocean Games 1979 Champion
Réunion
1st Title

== See also ==
- Indian Ocean Island Games
- Football at the Indian Ocean Island Games
