= Andy Sophie =

Mauritian footballer

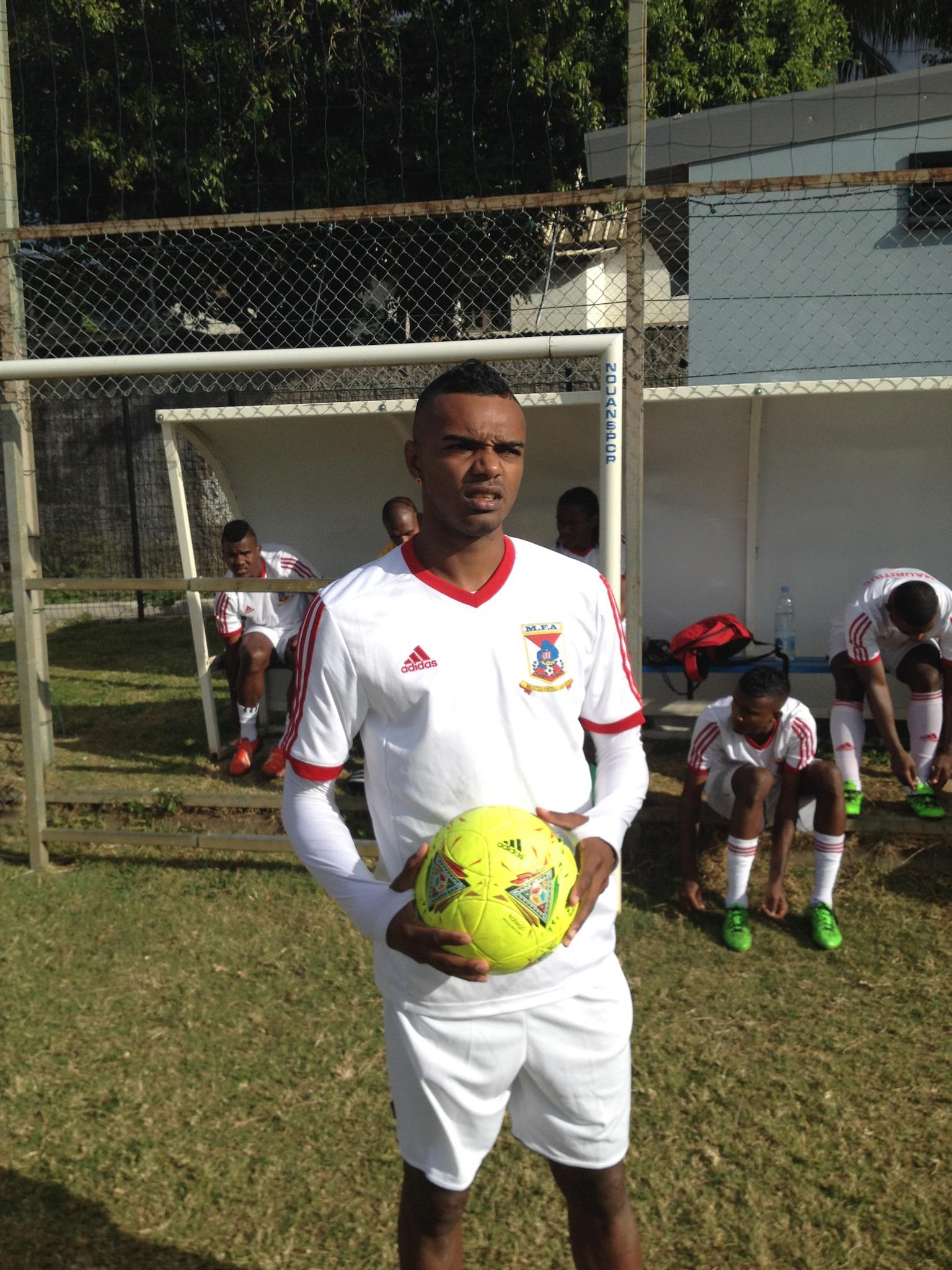
- GRSE Wanderers 2005 by Dadam97490

Personal information
- Full name: Andy Pierre Sophie
- Date of birth: 26 June 1987 (age 39)
- Place of birth: Port Louis, Mauritius
- Height: 6 ft 0 in (1.83 m)
- Position: Forward

Senior career*
Years	Team	Apps	(Gls)
2006–2007	Pamplemousses SC	–	(–)
2008	US Sainte-Marienne	23	(7)
2009	US Stade Tamponnaise	26	(2)
2010	SS Gauloise	21	(10)
2011–2012	JS Saint-Pierroise	19	(5)
2012	Pamplemousses SC	–	(–)
2013	AS Excelsior	–	(–)
2014–2015	AS Marsouins	18	(6)
2016–2017	SS Saint-Louisienne	4	(2)
2018	Sainte-Marienne	16	(2)
2019	Sainte-Suzanne	13	(2)
2019	Marsouins Saint-Leu	7	(0)
2020-2022	Grande Rivière Sud-Est Wanderers		
2022-2025	Pamplemousses	17	(6)

International career^{‡}
2007–2022	Mauritius	57	(11)
- * Club domestic league appearances and goals ‡ National team caps and goals as of 10 February 2024

Andy Sophie (born 26 June 1987) is a Mauritian football player who played as a forward.

== International career ==
=== International goals ===
Scores and results list Mauritius' goal tally first.

List of international goals scored by Andy Sophie
No	Date	Venue	Opponent	Score	Result	Competition
1.	18 August 2007	Mahamasina Municipal Stadium, Antananarivo, Madagascar	Mayotte	1–1	1–1 (2–4 p)	2007 Indian Ocean Island Games
2.	22 June 2008	Estádio da Várzea, Praia, Cape Verde	Cape Verde	1–2	1–3	2010 FIFA World Cup qualification
3.	25 March 2015	Stade George V, Curepipe, Mauritius	Burundi	1–0	2–2	Friendly
4.	28 March 2015	Anjalay Stadium , Pamplemousses District, Mauritius	Togo	1–0	1–1	Friendly
5.	21 May 2015	Royal Bafokeng Stadium, Phokeng, South Africa	Seychelles	1–0	1–0	2015 COSAFA Cup
6.	14 June 2015	Accra Sports Stadium, Accra, Ghana	Ghana	1–4	1–7	2017 Africa Cup of Nations qualification
7.	6 August 2015	Stade Jean-Ivoula, Saint-Denis, Réunion	Mayotte	1–0	1–2	2015 Indian Ocean Island Games
8.	7 August 2015	Stade Georges Lambrakis, Le Port, Réunion	Madagascar	1–1	3–1	2015 Indian Ocean Island Games
9.	7 August 2015	Stade Georges Lambrakis, Le Port, Réunion	Madagascar	2–1	3–1	2015 Indian Ocean Island Games
10.	7 October 2015	Stade George V, Curepipe, Mauritius	Kenya	1–3	2–5	2018 FIFA World Cup qualification
11.	16 June 2016	Independence Stadium, Windhoek, Namibia	Angola	2–0	2–0	2016 COSAFA Cup
