= Paulin Voavy =

Malagasy footballer (born 1987)

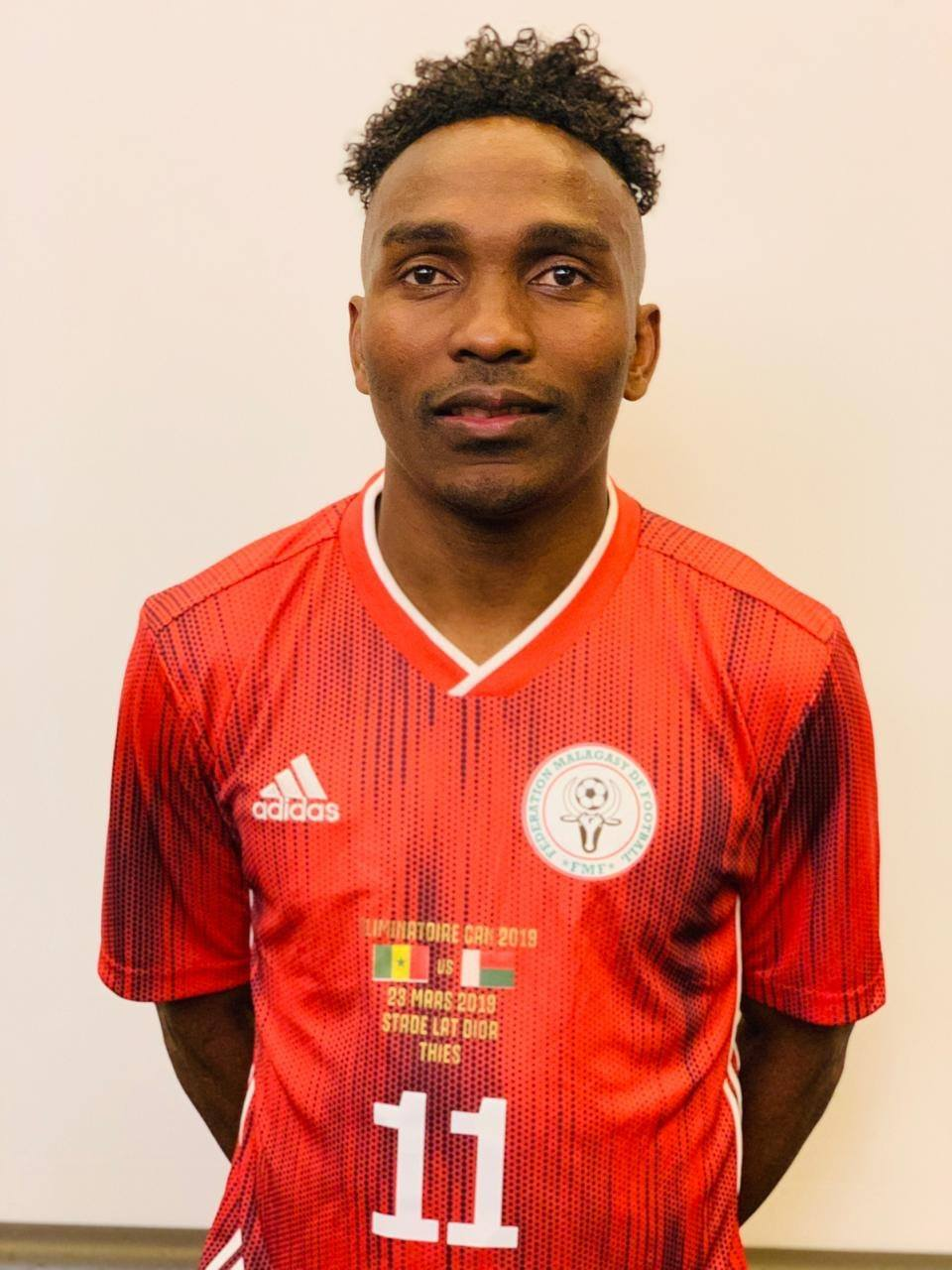
- Voavy in 2019

Personal information
- Date of birth: 10 November 1987 (age 38)
- Place of birth: Maintirano, Madagascar
- Height: 1.62 m (5 ft 4 in)
- Position: Striker

Senior career*
Years	Team	Apps	(Gls)
2006–2007	Saint-Pauloise		
2007–2008	Nantes B	23	(4)
2008–2010	Boulogne	3	(0)
2009–2010	→ Évian TGFC (loan)	28	(3)
2010–2014	Cannes	62	(11)
2014–2016	CS Constantine	50	(6)
2016–2021	El Makkasa	138	(18)
2021–2023	Ghazl El Mahalla	38	(1)
2023–2024	Saint-Pauloise FC		

International career^{‡}
2007–2022	Madagascar	67	(15)
- * Club domestic league appearances and goals as of 1 January 2024 ‡ National team caps and goals as of 23:28, 14 March 2023 (UTC)

Paulin Voavy (born 10 November 1987) is a Malagasy professional footballer who plays as a Striker. He made 67 appearances for the Madagascar national team, scoring 15 goals.

== Career statistics ==
As of match played 27 September 2022

Appearances and goals by national team and year
National team	Year	Apps	Goals
Madagascar	2003	4	0
Madagascar	2005	1	0
Madagascar	2007	13	7
Madagascar	2008	4	0
Madagascar	2010	2	0
Madagascar	2011	2	0
Madagascar	2012	1	1
Madagascar	2015	4	0
Madagascar	2016	3	0
Madagascar	2017	4	2
Madagascar	2018	6	1
Madagascar	2019	8	2
Madagascar	2020	3	1
Madagascar	2021	8	0
Madagascar	2022	4	1
Total		67	15

Scores and results list Madagascar's goal tally first, score column indicates score after each Voavy goal.

List of international goals scored by Paulin Voavy
No.	Date	Venue	Opponent	Score	Result	Competition
1	29 April 2007	Estádio da Machava, Matola, Mozambique	Seychelles	1–0	5–0	2007 COSAFA Cup
2	29 April 2007	Estádio da Machava, Matola, Mozambique	Seychelles	2–0	5–0	2007 COSAFA Cup
3	29 April 2007	Estádio da Machava, Matola, Mozambique	Seychelles	4–0	5–0	2007 COSAFA Cup
4	14 August 2007	Mahamasina Municipal Stadium, Antananarivo, Madagascar	Comoros	1–0	3–0	2007 Indian Ocean Island Games
5	14 August 2007	Mahamasina Municipal Stadium, Antananarivo, Madagascar	Comoros	2–0	3–0	2007 Indian Ocean Island Games
6	16 August 2007	Mahamasina Municipal Stadium, Antananarivo, Madagascar	Mayotte	2–0	4–0	2007 Indian Ocean Island Games
7	16 August 2007	Mahamasina Municipal Stadium, Antananarivo, Madagascar	Mayotte	4–0	4–0	2007 Indian Ocean Island Games
8	16 June 2012	Estádio da Várzea, Praia, Cape Verde	Cape Verde	1–3	1–3	2013 Africa Cup of Nations qualification
9	26 March 2017	Mahamasina Municipal Stadium, Antananarivo, Madagascar	São Tomé and Príncipe	1–0	3–2	2019 Africa Cup of Nations qualification
10	26 March 2017	Mahamasina Municipal Stadium, Antananarivo, Madagascar	São Tomé and Príncipe	2–0	3–2	2019 Africa Cup of Nations qualification
11	9 September 2018	Mahamasina Municipal Stadium, Antananarivo, Madagascar	Senegal	1–1	2–2	2019 Africa Cup of Nations qualification
12	2 June 2019	Stade Josy Barthel, Luxembourg City, Luxembourg	Luxembourg	1–1	3–3	Friendly
13	19 November 2019	Stade Général Seyni Kountché, Niamey, Niger	Niger	5–1	6–2	2021 Africa Cup of Nations qualification
–	9 October 2020	Stade Alphonse Theis, Hesperange, Luxembourg	(Luxembourg) Swift Hesperange	3–0	4–1	Friendly
14	12 November 2020	Stade Olympique Alassane Ouattara, Abidjan, Ivory Coast	Ivory Coast	1–2	1–2	2021 Africa Cup of Nations qualification
15	24 September 2022	Stade El Bachir, Mohammedia, Morocco	Congo	2–1	3–3	Friendly

== Honours ==
Évian TGFC

- Championnat National: 2009–10

CS Constantine

- best team player of the season 2015-2016.

Misr El Maqasa

- Egyptian Premier League runner-up: 2017

Madagascar

- Indian Ocean Island Games silver medal: 2007

Madagascar U20

- COSAFA U-20 Challenge Cup: 2005

Individual

- COSAFA Cup top scorer: 2007
- Indian Ocean Island Games Top scorer: 2007
- AFCON Qualifiers Best XI: 2019 Matchday 1
- Knight Order of Madagascar: 2019

Record

- top scorer of the madagascar team all time
