= 2012 Coupe de l'Outre-Mer =

Tournament details
- Host country: France
- Dates: 22–29 September
- Teams: 8
- Venue: 8 (in 8 host cities)

Final positions
- Champions: Réunion (2nd title)
- Runners-up: Martinique
- Third place: Guadeloupe
- Fourth place: Mayotte

Tournament statistics
- Matches played: 16
- Goals scored: 84 (5.25 per match)
- Top scorer(s): (Réunion) Jean-Michel Fontaine (7 goals)

La Coupe de l'Outre-Mer de football 2012 (English: The 2012 Overseas Football Cup) was the third edition of the Coupe de l'Outre-Mer, a football tournament for the overseas departments and territories of France. It took place from 22 to 29 September 2012 in Île-de-France, France.

Eight teams entered the third edition of the competition. The final was played at the Stade de Michel Hidalgo in Saint-Gratien and was contested by Réunion and Martinique in a replay of the 2008 and 2010 finals. After a 2–2 draw, Réunion won 10–9 in a penalty shoot-out.

The tournament marked the last appearance of the Saint Pierre and Miquelon national football team.

== Background ==
The Tournoi des Champions Antilles-Guyane was the first football competition played by club teams from the overseas departments and territories of France. It was contested by teams from French Guiana, Guadeloupe and Martinique and began in 1963. The Coupe D.O.M. and Coupe T.O.M were later introduced and the winners of each would play off against each other in the Coupe des Clubs Champions de l'Outre-Mer.

In 2008, the Coupe de l'Outre-Mer was introduced for the representative teams of the overseas departments and territories as a replacement for the Coupe des Clubs Champions de l'Outre-Mer.

In the inaugural edition, Réunion defeated Martinique 1–0 in the final. Two years later, Martinique gained revenge to win the trophy, defeating Réunion 5–3 on penalties in the final.

== Format ==
Eight teams took part in the competition. They were drawn into two single round robin groups of four teams. Unusually, four points were awarded for a win rather than three. Drawn matches in the group stage would end in a penalty shootout for a bonus point. The winning team from each group would contest the final, the runners-up would contest the third-place match, the third-placed teams would contest the fifth-place match and the fourth-placed teams would contest the seventh-place match.

== Draw ==
The draw for the group stage was made on 20 April 2012. The finalists from the 2010 edition, Martinique and Réunion, were seeded for the draw.

== Group stage ==
=== Group A ===
Réunion won all three of their matches to progress to the final.

Team	Pld	W	D	L	GF	GA	GD	Pts
Réunion	3	3	0	0	14	1	+13	9
Guadeloupe	3	2	0	1	18	4	+14	6
French Guiana	3	1	0	2	13	7	+6	3
Saint Pierre and Miquelon	3	0	0	3	1	34	−33	0

22 September
14:30

Guadeloupe	13–0	Saint Pierre and Miquelon
Pascal 13', 37', 44'; Mocka 16'; Babel 29'; Lambourde 51'; Bacoul 56'; Gotin 63', 73'; Zénon 68', 78', 85'; Lafortune 75'	Report

Stade de Montbauron, Versailles
Attendance: 300
Referee: Pari Oito (Tahiti)
22 September
17:00

Réunion	2–0	French Guiana
Fontaine 5'; Farro 38'	Report

Stade de Montbauron, Versailles
Attendance: 300
Referee: Bruno Fouquet (Martinique)

24 September
18:00

Réunion	10–0	Saint Pierre and Miquelon
Achelous 3', 28'; El Madaghri 16', 45'; Vallant 18'; Pythie 23'; D. Audouze 48' (o.g.); Fontaine 69', 76', 80'	Report

Stade Bauer, Saint-Ouen
Attendance: 200
Referee: Issmaila Ahamed (Mayotte)
24 September
20:30

Guadeloupe	4–2	French Guiana
Mocka 7', 25'; Pascal 12'; Bacoul 44'	Report	Dos Santos 60', 72'

Stade Bauer, Saint-Ouen
Attendance: 600
Referee: Ioné (New Caledonia)

26 September
19:30

Réunion	2–1	Guadeloupe
Fontaine 10', 82'	Report	Mocka 60'

Stade Jean Rolland, Franconville
Attendance: 300
Referee: Bruno Fouquet (Martinique)
26 September
19:30

French Guiana	11–1	Saint Pierre and Miquelon
Pigrée 5', 11', 44', 63' (pen.), 90'; Clet 30', 58'; Pikiento 77' (pen.); Sampain 80' (pen.); Lespérance 84'; Torvic 89'	Report	Mathiaud 68'

Parc des Sports, Saint-Ouen-l'Aumône
Attendance: 50
Referee: Pari Oito (Tahiti)

=== Group B ===
Martinique won their group on goal difference to progress to the final.

Team	Pld	W	D	L	GF	GA	GD	Pts
Martinique	3	2	0	1	7	3	+4	6
Mayotte	3	2	0	1	5	4	+1	6
Tahiti	3	2	0	1	5	5	0	6
New Caledonia	3	0	0	3	0	5	−5	0

22 September
15:00

Tahiti	1–3	Mayotte
Degage 84'	Report	Attoumani 29', 45', 59'

Stade Jean-Bouin, Issy-les-Moulineaux
Referee: Steeve Zabeau (Guadeloupe)
22 September
17:30

Martinique	2–0	New Caledonia
Parsemain 7', 83'	Report

Stade Jean-Bouin, Issy-les-Moulineaux
Attendance: 700
Referee: Marius Quenet (Réunion)

24 September
18:30

New Caledonia	0–2	Mayotte
	Report	Attoumani 73', 90'

Complexe Sportif Léo Lagrange, Corbeil-Essonnes
Attendance: 150
Referee: Guy Prevot (French Guiana)
24 September
21:00

Martinique	2–3	Tahiti
Delem 7'; Gustan 82'	Report	A. Tehau 46', 80'; Atani 67'

Complexe Sportif Léo Lagrange, Corbeil-Essonnes
Attendance: 700
Referee: Steeve Zabeau (Guadeloupe)

26 September
17:00

New Caledonia	0–1	Tahiti
	Report	Chong Hue 63'

Stade Jean Rolland, Franconville
Attendance: 200
Referee: Guy Prevot (French Guiana)
26 September
17:00

Martinique	3–0	Mayotte
Parsemain 29'; Tresfield 32'; Abaul 48'	Report

Parc des Sports, Saint-Ouen-l'Aumône
Attendance: 300
Referee: Marius Quenet (Réunion)

== Seventh-place match ==
New Caledonia defeated Saint Pierre and Miquelon in the seventh-place match.

28 September
16:30

Saint Pierre and Miquelon	1–16	New Caledonia
Delamaire 49'	Report	R. Audouze 7' (o.g.); Whanyamalla 13', 69' (pen.); R. Kayara 20', 60'; Haeko 24', 28', 53' (pen.); Kabeu 37'; Kaï 38', 85'; Kauma 41'; Mercier 48'; É. Béaruné 76'; G. Béaruné 80'; Moagou 84'

Clairefontaine, Clairefontaine-en-Yvelines
Attendance: 50
Referee: Guy Prevot (French Guiana)

== Fifth-place match ==
French Guiana defeated Tahiti in the fifth-place match.

28 September
14:00

French Guiana	2–1	Tahiti
Sophie 33'; Clet 61'	Report	Vallar 78' (pen.)

Clairefontaine, Clairefontaine-en-Yvelines
Attendance: 100
Referee: Bruno Fouquet (Martinique)

== Third-place match ==
Guadeloupe defeated Mayotte in the fifth-place match.

29 September
15:00

Guadeloupe	1–0	Mayotte
Pascal 74'	Report

Stade de Michel Hidalgo, Saint-Gratien
Attendance: 400
Referee: Marius Quenet (Réunion)

== Final ==
Réunion defeated Martinique in the final.

29 September
17:30

Réunion	2–2	Martinique
Fontaine 45'; Farro 68'	Report	Tresfield 6'; Gustan 52'
Penalties
Elcaman (penalty scored); Hubert (penalty missed); Fontaine (penalty scored); Bador (penalty scored); Farro (penalty scored); Payet (penalty scored); Achelous (penalty scored); Ali (penalty scored); Siala-Chamba (penalty missed); Pélops (penalty scored); Elcaman (penalty missed); Farro (penalty scored); Achelous (penalty scored)	10–9	Parsemain (penalty scored); Tresfield (penalty scored); Bannais (penalty scored); Maingé (penalty scored); Delem (penalty missed); Vitulin (penalty scored); Gustan (penalty scored); Anglio (penalty scored); Abaul (penalty missed); Vermignon (penalty scored); Parsemain (penalty missed); Bannais (penalty scored); Tresfield (penalty missed)

Stade de Michel Hidalgo, Saint-Gratien
Attendance: 5,000
Referee: Lionel Jaffredo

== Aftermath ==
Saint Pierre and Miquelon have not played a match since the 2012 Coupe de l'Outre-Mer.
