= Football at the 2015 Indian Ocean Island Games – Men's tournament =

2015 Men's Indian Ocean Island Games Football Tournament
Tournament details
- Host country: Réunion
- Dates: 31 July – 8 August 2015 (8 days)
- Teams: 7 (from 2 confederations)

Final positions
- Champions: Réunion (4th title)
- Runners-up: Mayotte
- Third place: Mauritius
- Fourth place: Madagascar

Tournament statistics
- Matches played: 13
- Goals scored: 36 (2.77 per match)
- Top scorer(s): (Réunion) Jean-Michel Fontaine (Madagascar) Jimmy Simouri (3 goals each)

The men's association football tournament at the 2015 Indian Ocean Island Games (French: Jeux des îles de l'océan Indien 2015) is held in Réunion. The draw for the football tournament was made at Saint-Denis on 14 May 2015.

== Teams ==
- Comoros
- Madagascar
- Maldives
- Mauritius
- Mayotte
- Réunion
- Seychelles

== Squads ==
Each association presented a list of at most twenty players to compete in the tournament.

== Group stage ==
=== Group A ===
Pos	Team	Pld	W	D	L	GF	GA	GD	Pts	Qualification
1	Mayotte	3	2	1	0	5	2	+3	7	Advance to knockout stage
2	Madagascar	3	1	1	1	5	4	+1	4	Advance to knockout stage
3	Seychelles	3	1	0	2	4	3	+1	3	
4	Maldives	3	1	0	2	3	8	−5	3	

Source: IOCS
Rules for classification: Tie-breaking criteria
31 July 2015

Seychelles	3–0 ^{1}	Madagascar
	Report

Stade Jean-Ivoula, Saint-Denis, Réunion
Referee: (Réunion) Steeve Dubec
31 July 2015

Maldives	1–3	Mayotte
Umair 12'	Report	Ben Yahaya 54'; Rasolofo 83'; Noussoura 88'

Stade Jean-Allane, Saint-Benoît, Réunion
Referee: (Mauritius) Dharamveer Hurbungs
2 August 2015

Seychelles	1–2	Maldives
Esther 5'	Report	Umair 28' (pen.); Imaz 43'

Stade Baby-Larivière, Saint-André, Réunion
Referee: (Mauritius) Imtehaz Heeralall
2 August 2015

Mayotte	1–1	Madagascar
Faya 28'	Report	Vombola 77'

Stade Michel Volnay, Saint-Pierre, Réunion
Referee: (Réunion) Steeve Dubec
4 August 2015

Maldives	0–4	Madagascar
	Report	Simouri 44', 46'; Rakotoarimalala 70'; Vombola 90'

Stade Baby-Larivière, Saint-André, Réunion
Referee: (Mauritius) Imtehaz Heeralall
4 August 2015

Seychelles	0–1	Mayotte
	Report	Rasolofo 66' (pen.)

Stade Michel Volnay, Saint-Pierre, Réunion
Referee: (Réunion) Didier Ringuin

^{1} Due to a scheduling error, Madagascar's team arrived on Friday night believing that the match was scheduled for the following afternoon, and thus failed to appear for the match.

=== Group B ===
Pos	Team	Pld	W	D	L	GF	GA	GD	Pts	Qualification
1	Réunion (H)	2	2	0	0	4	0	+4	6	Advance to knockout stage
2	Mauritius	2	1	0	1	3	1	+2	3	Advance to knockout stage
3	Comoros	2	0	0	2	0	6	−6	0	

Source: IOCS
Rules for classification: Tie-breaking criteria
(H) Hosts
31 July 2015

Réunion	1–0	Mauritius
Fontaine 19'	Report

Stade Michel Volnay, Saint-Pierre, Réunion
Attendance: 5000
Referee: (Mayotte) Omar Saïd
2 August 2015

Comoros	0–3 ^{1}	Mauritius
	Report

Stade Georges Lambrakis, Le Port, Réunion
Referee: (Maldives) Zaeem Ali
4 August 2015

Réunion	3–0 ^{1}	Comoros
	Report

Stade Jean-Ivoula, Saint-Denis, Réunion
Referee: (Mayotte) Omar Saïd

^{1} Comoros withdrew from the tournament as their team were unable to enter Rèunion due to visa issues.

== Knockout stage ==
Semi-finals
August 6
Mayotte	2
Mauritius	1
August 6
Réunion (a.e.t.)	1
Madagascar	0

Final
August 8
Mayotte	1
Réunion	3
Third place
August 7
Mauritius	3
Madagascar	1

=== Semi-finals ===
6 August 2015

Mayotte	2–1	Mauritius
Ben Yahaya 61'; Kamal 68'	Report	Sophie 55'

Stade Jean-Ivoula, Saint-Denis, Réunion
Referee: (Réunion) Steeve Dubec
6 August 2015

Réunion	1–0 (a.e.t.)	Madagascar
Loricourt 117'	Report

Stade Michel Volnay, Saint-Pierre, Réunion
Referee: (Maldives) Zaeem Ali

=== Third place match ===
7 August 2015

Mauritius	3–1	Madagascar
Sophie 83', 86'; Perticot 89'	Report	Simouri 90+5'

Stade Georges Lambrakis, Le Port, Réunion
Referee: (Seychelles) Nelson Emile

=== Final ===
8 August 2015

Mayotte	1–3	Réunion
Attoumani 90+1'	Report	Fontaine 7', 17'; Boesso 67'

Stade Jean-Ivoula, Saint-Denis, Réunion
Referee: (Madagascar) Adboul Kanoso

== Final ranking ==
Pos	Team	Pld	W	D	L	GF	GA	GD	Pts	Final result
1	Réunion (H)	4	4	0	0	8	1	+7	12	Champions
2	Mayotte	5	3	1	1	8	6	+2	10	Runners-up
3	Mauritius	4	2	0	2	7	4	+3	6	Third place
4	Madagascar	5	1	1	3	6	8	−2	4	Fourth place
5	Seychelles	3	1	0	2	4	3	+1	3	Eliminated in Group stage
6	Maldives	3	1	0	2	3	8	−5	3	Eliminated in Group stage
7	Comoros	2	0	0	2	0	6	−6	0	Eliminated in Group stage

Source: IOCS
(H) Hosts

Per statistical convention in football, matches decided in extra time are counted as wins and losses, while matches decided by penalty shoot-out are counted as draws.
