= 2008 Coupe de l'Outre-Mer =

Tournament details
- Host country: France
- Dates: 24 September – 4 October
- Teams: 7 (from 3 confederations)
- Venue: 8 (in 7 host cities)

Final positions
- Champions: Réunion (1st title)
- Runners-up: Martinique
- Third place: Guadeloupe
- Fourth place: French Guiana

Tournament statistics
- Matches played: 12
- Goals scored: 35 (2.92 per match)
- Top scorer: Réunion Mamoudou Diallo (4 goals)

La Coupe de l'Outre-Mer de football 2008 (English: The 2008 Overseas Football Cup) was the inaugural edition of the Coupe de l'Outre-Mer. The competition took place between 24 September 2008 and 4 October 2008 in Île-de-France, France.

Seven teams entered the inaugural edition. The final was played at the Stade Dominique Duvauchelle in Créteil, Val de Marne and was contested by Réunion and Martinique. Mamoudou Diallo scored the only goal in the final as Réunion won the inaugural competition.

== Background ==
The Tournoi des Champions Antilles-Guyane was the first football competition played by club teams from the overseas departments and territories of France. It was contested by teams from French Guiana, Guadeloupe and Martinique and began in 1963. The Coupe D.O.M. and Coupe T.O.M were later introduced and the winners of each would play off against each other in the Coupe des Clubs Champions de l'Outre-Mer.

In 2008, the Coupe de l'Outre-Mer was introduced for the representative teams of the overseas departments and territories as a replacement for the Coupe des Clubs Champions de l'Outre-Mer.

== Format ==
Seven teams took part in the competition. They were drawn into two single round robin groups – one of three teams and one of four teams. Unusually, four points were awarded for a win rather than three. Drawn matches in the group stage would end in a penalty shootout for a bonus point. The winning team from each group would contest the final, the runners-up would contest the third-place match and the third-placed teams would contest the fifth-place match.

=== Venues ===
- Stade Marville – La Courneuve (Seine Saint-Denis)
- Stade Jean Rolland – Franconville (Val d'Oise)
- Stade Municipal – Melun (Seine et Marne)
- Complexe Sportif Léo Lagrange – Bonneuil (Val de Marne)
- Stade Dominique Duvauchelle – Créteil (Val de Marne)
- Stade Yves du Manoir – Colombes (Hauts de Seine)
- Stade Léo Lagrange – Poissy (Yvelines)
- Stade Henri Longuet – Viry-Châtillon (Essonne)

=== Participants ===
- Guadeloupe
- Martinique
- French Guiana
- Réunion
- Mayotte
- New Caledonia
- Tahiti (represented by AS Manu-Ura)

=== Teams that did not compete ===
- Saint Pierre and Miquelon
- Wallis and Futuna
- Saint Martin
- Saint Barthélemy

== Group stage ==
=== Group 1 ===
Martinique won their group to progress to the final.

Team	Pts	Pld	W	WP	LP	L	GF	GA	GD
Martinique	10	3	2	1	0	0	3	1	+2
Guadeloupe	8	3	2	0	0	1	5	1	+4
New Caledonia	5	3	1	0	1	1	2	5	−3
Tahiti	0	3	0	0	0	3	0	3	−3

24 September

Tahiti	0–1	New Caledonia
		Michel Hmeun 90'

Stade Marville, La Courneuve
24 September

Guadeloupe	0–1	Martinique
		Patrick Percin 46'

Stade Marville, La Courneuve
Referee: Macoral (REU)

27 September

New Caledonia	0–4	Guadeloupe
		Fabien Jerome 6'; Lery Hanany 48'; Gregory Gendrey 60'; Jean-Luc Lambourde 80'

Stade Municipal, Melun
Referee: Alain (GUF)
27 September

Tahiti	0–1	Martinique
		Kevin Saint-Louis-Augustin 12'

Stade Municipal, Melun

30 September

Tahiti	0–1	Guadeloupe
		Ludovic Gotin 74'

Stade Yves du Manoir, Colombes
30 September

New Caledonia	1–1	Martinique
César Lolohea 48'		Kévin Saint-Louis-Augustin 49'
Penalties
	3–4

Stade Léo Lagrange, Poissy
Referee: Alain (GUF)

=== Group 2 ===
Réunion won both of their games to progress to the final.

Team	Pts	Pld	W	WP	LP	L	GF	GA	GD
Réunion	8	2	2	0	0	0	8	1	+7
French Guiana	4	2	1	0	0	1	4	4	0
Mayotte	0	2	0	0	0	2	3	10	−7

25 September

Mayotte	1–6	Réunion
Anli Abdou 73'		Mamoudou Diallo 15', 55', 80'; Quentin Boesso 36', 87'; Eric Farro 50'

Stade Jean Rolland, Franconville

28 September

French Guiana	4–2	Mayotte
Wilson Lecante; David Martinon; Mario Clothilde

Complexe sportif Léo Lagrange, Bonneuil-sur-Marne

1 October

French Guiana	0–2	Réunion
		Eric Farro 2'; Quentin Boesso 31' (pen.)

Stade Henri Longuet, Viry-Châtillon

== Fifth-place match ==
New Caledonia defeated Mayotte in the fifth-place match.

3 October

New Caledonia	3–2	Mayotte
Pierre Wajoka 53', 87' (pen.); Bertrand Kai 58'		Tarmidhi Hamada 12'; Ahamadi Houmadi 50'

Stade Marville, La Courneuve
Referee: Touraine (GDP)

== Third-place match ==
Guadeloupe defeated French Guiana in the third-place match.

3 October

Guadeloupe	4–0	French Guiana
Lery Hanany 1', 62'; Jean-Luc Lambourde 37'; Minnji Gomez 47'

Stade Marville, La Courneuve

== Final ==
Réunion defeated Martinique in the final.

4 October

Martinique	0–1	Réunion
		Mamoudou Diallo 47'

Stade Dominique Duvauchelle, Créteil, Val de Marne
Referee: Piccirillo (FRA)
