= Football at the 1993 Indian Ocean Island Games =

Tournament details
- Host country: Seychelles
- Teams: 5 (from 1 confederation)

Final positions
- Champions: Madagascar (2nd title)
- Runners-up: Réunion
- Third place: Mauritius

Tournament statistics
- Matches played: 9
- Goals scored: 28 (3.11 per match)
- Top scorer(s): (Mauritius) Antoine Mocude (5 goals)

1993 Indian Ocean Games in Seychelles

Played at Stade Linite in Victoria, Seychelles

== Group stage ==
=== Group A ===
Pos	Team	Pld	W	D	L	GF	GA	GD	Pts	Qualification
1	Madagascar	2	2	0	0	7	1	+6	6	Advance to knockout stage
2	Mauritius	2	1	0	1	4	2	+2	3	Advance to knockout stage
3	Comoros	2	0	0	2	0	8	−8	0	

Source: IOCS
Rules for classification: Tie-breaking criteria
20 August 1993

Madagascar	5–0	Comoros
S. Rafanodina 4', 41'; Mosa 18', 58'; Ranaivoson 83'

Stade Linite, Seychelles

22 August 1993

Mauritius	3–0	Comoros
Mocude 26', 47', 63'

Stade Linite, Seychelles

24 August 1993

Mauritius	1–2	Madagascar
Lebon 1'		Rasoanaivo 39', 60'

Stade Linite, Seychelles

=== Group B ===
Pos	Team	Pld	W	D	L	GF	GA	GD	Pts	Qualification
1	Réunion	2	2	0	0	4	0	+4	6	Advance to knockout stage
2	Seychelles (H)	2	0	0	2	0	4	−4	0	Advance to knockout stage

Source: IOCS
Rules for classification: Tie-breaking criteria
(H) Hosts
22 August 1993

Réunion	2–0	Seychelles
Brennus 4'; Lacollay 47'

Stade Linite, Seychelles

24 August 1993

Seychelles	0–2	Réunion
		Moultanin 3'; Sellambarom 24'

Stade Linite, Seychelles

== Knockout stage ==
Semi-finals
26 August
Madagascar	2
Seychelles	1
26 August
Réunion	1
Mauritius	0

Final
29 August
Madagascar	1
Réunion	0
Third place
28 August
Seychelles	2
Mauritius	6

=== Semi-final ===
26 August 1993

Madagascar	2–1	Seychelles
Rasoanaivo 70'; S. Rafanodina 77'		Jean-Louis 43'

Stade Linite, Seychelles

26 August 1993

Réunion	1–0	Mauritius
Moultanin 10'

Stade Linite, Seychelles

=== Third place match ===
28 August 1993

Seychelles	2–6	Mauritius
Mousbé 37'; Jean-Louis 39'		Mocude 50', 61'; Lebon 56', 68'; François 46'; Esmyot 83'

Stade Linite, Seychelles

== Final ==
29 August 1993

Madagascar	1–0	Réunion
S. Rafanodina 83'

Stade Linite, Seychelles

== Final ranking ==
Pos	Team	Pld	W	D	L	GF	GA	GD	Pts	Final result
1	Madagascar	4	4	0	0	10	2	+8	12	Champions
2	Réunion	4	3	0	1	5	1	+4	9	Runners-up
3	Mauritius	4	2	0	2	10	5	+5	6	Third place
4	Seychelles (H)	4	0	0	4	3	12	−9	0	Fourth place
5	Comoros	2	0	0	2	0	8	−8	0	Group stage

Source: IOCS
(H) Hosts

Per statistical convention in football, matches decided in extra time are counted as wins and losses, while matches decided by penalty shoot-out are counted as draws.

== See also ==
- Indian Ocean Island Games
- Football at the Indian Ocean Island Games
