= Coupe de l'Outre-Mer =

La Coupe de l'Outre-Mer
- Organiser(s): FFF
- Founded: 2008
- Abolished: 2013
- Most championships: Réunion (2 titles)
- Website: fff.fr/coup/outremer

La Coupe de l'Outre-Mer de football (English: The Overseas Football Cup) was a biennial football competition that was organised by the Fédération Française de Football (FFF) and first played in 2008. The competition was open to the regional football teams of the overseas departments and territories of France and was held in mainland France. It was a replacement for the Coupe des Clubs Champions de l'Outre-Mer.

The competition was played three times: in 2008, 2010 and 2012. Réunion won the competition twice and Martinique once.

In 2013, the FFF scrapped the tournament due to the cost.

== History ==
The Tournoi des Champions Antilles-Guyane was the first football competition played by club teams from the overseas departments and territories of France. It was contested by teams from French Guiana, Guadeloupe and Martinique and began in 1963. The Coupe D.O.M. and Coupe T.O.M were later introduced and the winners of each would play off against each other in the Coupe des Clubs Champions de l'Outre-Mer.

In 2008, the Coupe de l'Outre-Mer was introduced for the representative teams of the overseas departments and territories as a replacement for the Coupe des Clubs Champions de l'Outre-Mer.

The first edition took place between 24 September and 4 October 2008. Seven of the 11 eligible overseas departments and territories entered the competition which was played in Île-de-France. Réunion defeated Martinique 1–0 in the final.

Two years later, the second edition saw an eighth team, Saint Pierre and Miquelon, enter the competition. However, the final was contested by the same two teams. Martinique gained revenge for their loss in the previous final by winning the trophy, defeating Réunion 5–3 on penalties.

What was to become the final edition in 2012 was again contested by the same eight teams and, for the third consecutive edition, the final was contested by Réunion and Martinique. A penalty shootout was again required but this time Réunion prevailed 10–9 to win the tournament for the second time.

Although scheduled for a 2014 edition, the competition was dissolved in late 2013 after the Fédération Française de Football decided it was too expensive.

== Eligible participants ==
- French Guiana
- Guadeloupe
- Martinique
- Mayotte
- New Caledonia
- Réunion
- Saint Barthélemy
- Saint Martin
- Saint Pierre and Miquelon
- Tahiti
- Wallis and Futuna

== Results ==
Year	Host	Final			Third Place		
Year	Host	Gold medal	Score	Silver medal	Bronze medal	Score	Fourth place
2008; Details	France	Réunion	1–0	Martinique	Guadeloupe	4–0	French Guiana
2010; Details	France	Martinique	0–0 (5–3 p)	Réunion	Guadeloupe	4–0	Mayotte
2012; Details	France	Réunion	2–2 (10–9 p)	Martinique	Guadeloupe	1–0	Mayotte

== Cumulative results ==
Team	Titles	Runners-up	Third place	Fourth place
Réunion	2 (2008, 2012)	1 (2010)	0	0
Martinique	1 (2010)	2 (2008, 2012)	0	0
Guadeloupe	0	0	3 (2008, 2010, 2012)	0
Mayotte	0	0	0	2 (2010, 2012)
French Guiana	0	0	0	1 (2008)
