= Ludovic Gotin =

Guadeloupean footballer (born 1985)

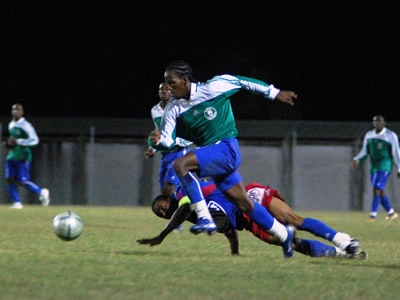
- Gotin in 2008

Personal information
- Date of birth: 25 July 1985 (age 41)
- Place of birth: Les Abymes, Guadeloupe
- Height: 1.76 m (5 ft 9 in)
- Position: Striker

Team information
- Current team: Le Moule

Senior career*
| Years | Team | Apps | (Gls) |
| 2004–2005 | Le Moule | | |
| 2005–2006 | Avion | | |
| 2006– | Le Moule | | |

International career
| 2006–2017 | Guadeloupe | 34 | (15) |
- * Club domestic league appearances and goals as of 7 December 2010

Ludovic Gotin (born 25 July 1985) is a Guadeloupean footballer who plays as a striker for Guadeloupe Division d'Honneur club Le Moule. While he has spent the majority of his career playing on the island of Guadeloupe, he also played in metropolitan France in 2005–06 with amateur club CS Avion. He made 34 appearances for the Guadeloupe national team, scoring 15 goals.

== Career statistics ==
Scores and results list Guadeloupe's goal tally first, score column indicates score after each Gotin goal.

List of international goals scored by Ludovic Gotin
| No. | Date | Venue | Opponent | Score | Result | Competition |
|---|---|---|---|---|---|---|
| 1 | 24 September 2006 | Stade René Serge Nabajoth, Les Abymes, Guadeloupe | Martinique | 1–0 | 4–0 | 2007 Caribbean Cup qualification |
| 2 | 24 September 2006 | Stade René Serge Nabajoth, Les Abymes, Guadeloupe | Martinique | 3–0 | 4–0 | 2007 Caribbean Cup qualification |
| 3 | 30 September 2008 | Stade Olympique Yves-du-Manoir, Colombes, France | Tahiti | 1–0 | 1–0 | 2008 Coupe de l'Outre-Mer |
| 4 | 11 October 2008 | Stade René Serge Nabajoth, Les Abymes, Guadeloupe | Cayman Islands | 2–0 | 2–0 | 2008 Caribbean Cup qualification |
| 5 | 15 October 2008 | Stade René Serge Nabajoth, Les Abymes, Guadeloupe | Martinique | 3–1 | 3–1 | 2008 Caribbean Cup qualification |
| 6 | 9 July 2009 | NRG Stadium, Houston, Texas, United States | Nicaragua | 2–0 | 2–0 | 2009 CONCACAF Gold Cup |
| 7 | 26 September 2010 | Stade Henri-Longuet, Viry-Châtillon, France | Tahiti | 1–1 | 1–1 (2–4 pen.) | 2010 Coupe de l'Outre-Mer |
| 8 | 1 October 2010 | Stade de Paris, Paris, France | "|Mayotte | 1–0 | 4–0 | 2010 Coupe de l'Outre-Mer |
| 9 | 1 October 2010 | Stade de Paris, Paris, France | "|Mayotte | 2–0 | 4–0 | 2010 Coupe de l'Outre-Mer |
| 10 | 1 October 2010 | Stade de Paris, Paris, France | "|Mayotte | 4–0 | 4–0 | 2010 Coupe de l'Outre-Mer |
| 11 | 24 October 2010 | Grenada National Stadium, St. George's, Grenada | Puerto Rico | 2–0 | 2–0 | 2010 Caribbean Cup qualification |
| 12 | 5 December 2010 | Stade Pierre-Aliker, Fort-de-France, Martinique | Jamaica | 1–1 | 1–1 (4–5 pen.) | 2010 Caribbean Cup |
| 13 | 22 September 2012 | Stade de Montbauron, Versailles, France | Saint Pierre and Miquelon | 8–0 | 13–0 | 2012 Coupe de l'Outre-Mer |
| 14 | 22 September 2012 | Stade de Montbauron, Versailles, France | Saint Pierre and Miquelon | 10–0 | 13–0 | 2012 Coupe de l'Outre-Mer |
| 15 | 8 October 2004 | Stade René Serge Nabajoth, Les Abymes, Guadeloupe | Saint Vincent and the Grenadines | 2–1 | 3–1 | 2014 Caribbean Cup qualification |

== Honours ==
- Guadeloupe Championnat National: 1

2009

- Coupe de Guadeloupe: 1

2008
