= Football at the 2015 Indian Ocean Island Games =

2015 Football at the Indian Ocean Island Games
Jeux des îles de l'océan Indien

Tournament details
- Host country: Réunion
- Dates: 1–8 August 2015
- Teams: (from 2 confederations)

The men's association football tournament at the 2015 Indian Ocean Island Games (French: Jeux des îles de l'océan Indien 2015) will be held in Réunion.

The competition format will be determined based upon the number of teams entering the competition. Each team will have up to 20 players.

If more than four teams enter there will be two Groups; A and B. Réunion, the representative team of the host will be placed in Group A and Seychelles, the winner of the 2011 edition will be placed in Group B.

== Venues ==
Six football stadiums will host matches of the Football competition

- Stade Jean-Ivoula, Saint-Denis
- Stade Michel Volnay, Saint-Pierre
- Stade Jean-Allane, Saint-Benoît
- Stade Klébert Picard, Le Tampon
- Stade Baby-Larivière, Saint-André
- Stade Georges Lambrakis, Le Port

== See also ==
- Indian Ocean Island Games
- Football at the Indian Ocean Island Games
