= Yannis Bègue =

Saint Pierre and Miquelon footballer (born 1982)

Personal information
- Date of birth: 2 January 1982 (age 44)
- Place of birth: Saint-Pierre, Saint Pierre and Miquelon, France
- Height: 1.80 m (5 ft 11 in)
- Position: Midfielder

Youth career
- –1999: Auxerre

Senior career*
Years	Team	Apps	(Gls)
1999–2000	Raith Rovers	2	(0)
2000–2001	Albion Rovers	12	(2)
2002–2003	FC Avirons		

International career
2005	Saint Pierre and Miquelon		
- * Club domestic league appearances and goals

Yannis Bègue (born 2 January 1982) is a former professional footballer who played as a midfielder.

== Club career ==
Bègue came up through the youth system of Auxerre. He signed a professional contract with Raith Rovers of the Scottish Division One in November 1999 at age 17. He made two substitute appearances during the season. Following the 1999–2000 season he joined Albion Rovers of Scotland's Third Division. He made twelve league appearances and scored two goals throughout the season. He also scored a first-half wonderstrike in a friendly against Motherwell for which he was called a supersub by the BBC. On 4 August 2001, he was released by Albion at the conclusion of the season.

In 2002 he went to Réunion and had a brief stint with FC Avirons of the Premier League but left because of a contract dispute. At this time he returned to the United Kingdom to find a club along with his Scottish girlfriend but was ultimately unsuccessful. He returned to Réunion the following year and was in contract discussions with Saint-Pierroise.

== International career ==
Bègue represented his native Saint Pierre and Miquelon at the international level, including in matches in 2005.
