= Réunion national football team =

Regional association football team

Réunion
- Nickname: Club R
- Association: Ligue réunionnaise de football (LRF)
- Confederation: CAF (Africa)
- Sub-confederation: COSAFA (Southern Africa)
- Head coach: Christian Dafreville
- Captain: Bertrand Bador
- Most caps: Jean-Michel Fontaine (29)
- Top scorer: Jean-Michel Fontaine (15)
- Home stadium: Stade Jean-Ivoula
- FIFA code: REU
First colours	Second colours

First international
- Madagascar 4–2 Réunion (Madagascar; Date Unknown, 1947)

Biggest win
- Unofficial; Réunion 11–0 Saint Pierre and Miquelon (Saint-Gratien, France; 22 September 2010); Official; Réunion 9–0 Maldives (Saint-Denis, Réunion; 28 August 1979); Réunion 9–0 Maldives (Curepipe, Mauritius; 30 August 1985)

Biggest defeat
- Mauritius 15–2 Réunion (Madagascar; Date Unknown, 1950)

The Réunion national football team (French: Sélection de la Réunion de football) is the regional team of the French overseas department and region of Réunion and is controlled by the Ligue réunionnaise de football, the local branch of the French Football Federation. Réunion is not a member of FIFA and is only an associate member of CAF, and is therefore not eligible to enter either the FIFA World Cup or the Africa Cup of Nations. However, it has played numerous matches, most of them against the island nations of Madagascar, Mauritius, and the Seychelles.

== History ==
Réunion's first international came in the 1947 Triangulaire, losing twice against Mauritius (2–1) and Madagascar (4–2). Réunion won their first match in the 1950 edition, beating Madagascar 3–2.

In the 1979 Indian Ocean Island Games, Réunion qualified top of their group, beating Seychelles (3–0) and Maldives (9–0). In the semi-finals, they beat Comoros (6–1), leading to a rematch against Seychelles in the final. Réunion won 2–1.

Réunion qualified for the final of the 1985 Indian Ocean Island Games, losing on penalties to Mauritius after a 4–4 draw. Réunion got out of the group stage again at the 1993 Games, beating Mauritius in the semi-finals 1–0 with Jimmy Moultanin scoring their only goal. They lost 1–0 to Madagascar in the final. They got their revenge against Madagascar in the 1998 final, drawing 3–3 in regular time before winning 7–6 on penalties.

Réunion made it to the final of the 2003 Indian Ocean Island Games losing to the hosts Mauritius 2–1. In the 2007 Games, Réunion won the competition despite scoring only two goals.

Réunion entered the inaugural 2008 Coupe de l'Outre-Mer, winning their group against Mayotte (6–1) and French Guiana (2–0), qualifying for the final, where they beat Martinique (1–0). They entered the 2010 Coupe de l'Outre-Mer, facing Martinique again in the final, losing on penalties.

Réunion advanced to the knock-out stages of the 2011 Indian Ocean Island Games, losing to Seychelles (2–1) in extra-time. They beat Mayotte 1–0 to claim third place. In the 2012 Coupe de l'Outre-Mer Réunion qualified for the final match, beating French Guiana (2–0), Saint Pierre and Miquelon (10–0) and Guadeloupe (2–1) before meeting Martinique for the third consequtive final, defeating them 10–9 on penalties. In the 2015 Games Réunion beat Mayotte 3–1 in the final and in the 2019 competition they beat Mauritius on penalties, with Mathieu Pélops saving all five attempts in the penalty shoot-out.

== Latest squad ==
The following players were selected to the squad for the 2023 Indian Ocean Island Games.

Caps and goals updated as of 28 July 2019, after the match against Mauritius.

No.	Pos.	Player	Date of birth (age)	Caps	Goals	Club
	GK	Mathieu Pélops	7 November 1986 (age 39)	13	0	(Ligue réunionnaise de football) AS Corbeil-Essonnes
	GK	Grégory Pausé	30 November 1979 (age 46)	2	0	(Ligue réunionnaise de football) SS Jeanne d'Arc
	DF	Sébastien K’Bidy	2 February 1987 (age 39)	16	0	(Ligue réunionnaise de football) Saint-Denis FC
	DF	Bertrand Bador	16 April 1987 (age 39)	15	0	(Ligue réunionnaise de football) JS Saint-Pierroise
	DF	Joé Damour	26 January 1990 (age 36)	5	1	(Ligue réunionnaise de football) JS Saint-Pierroise
	DF	Mickaël Dubaril	2 December 1990 (age 35)	4	0	(Ligue réunionnaise de football) Trois-Bassins
	DF	Mathieu Sarpedon	25 May 1991 (age 35)	4	1	(Ligue réunionnaise de football) La Tamponnaise
	DF	Florent Ichiza	2 February 1993 (age 33)	3	0	(Ligue réunionnaise de football) US Sainte-Marienne
	MF	Yoann Guichard	9 September 1986 (age 40)	9	0	(Ligue réunionnaise de football) Saint-Denis FC
	MF	Thomas Souevamanien	7 September 1993 (age 33)	8	0	(Ligue réunionnaise de football) JS Saint-Pierroise
	MF	Jonathan Boyer	9 December 1992 (age 33)	5	0	(Ligue réunionnaise de football) JS Saint-Pierroise
	MF	Anjy Vardapin	13 October 1994 (age 32)	5	1	(Ligue réunionnaise de football) JS Saint-Pierroise
	MF	Karim Imira	12 April 1994 (age 32)	3	0	(Ligue réunionnaise de football) AS Excelsior
	MF	Jean-Thomas Alpou	2 July 1998 (age 28)	2	0	(Ligue réunionnaise de football) Saint-Denis FC
	MF	Ronan Nédélec	19 May 1996 (age 30)	1	0	(Ligue réunionnaise de football) La Tamponnaise
	FW	Jean-Michel Fontaine	28 August 1988 (age 38)	26	15	(Ligue réunionnaise de football) JS Saint-Pierroise
	FW	Alexandre Loricourt	24 March 1992 (age 34)	7	2	(Ligue réunionnaise de football) JS Saint-Pierroise
	FW	Akbar Assoumani	21 January 1997 (age 29)	4	1	(Ligue réunionnaise de football) Saint-Denis FC
	FW	Loic Rivière	2 August 1994 (age 32)	4	1	(Ligue réunionnaise de football) La Tamponnaise
	FW	Sylvain Philéas	24 January 1994 (age 32)	3	1	(Ligue réunionnaise de football) La Tamponnaise

== Records ==
As of 2 September 2023
Players in bold are still active with Réunion.

=== Most appearances ===
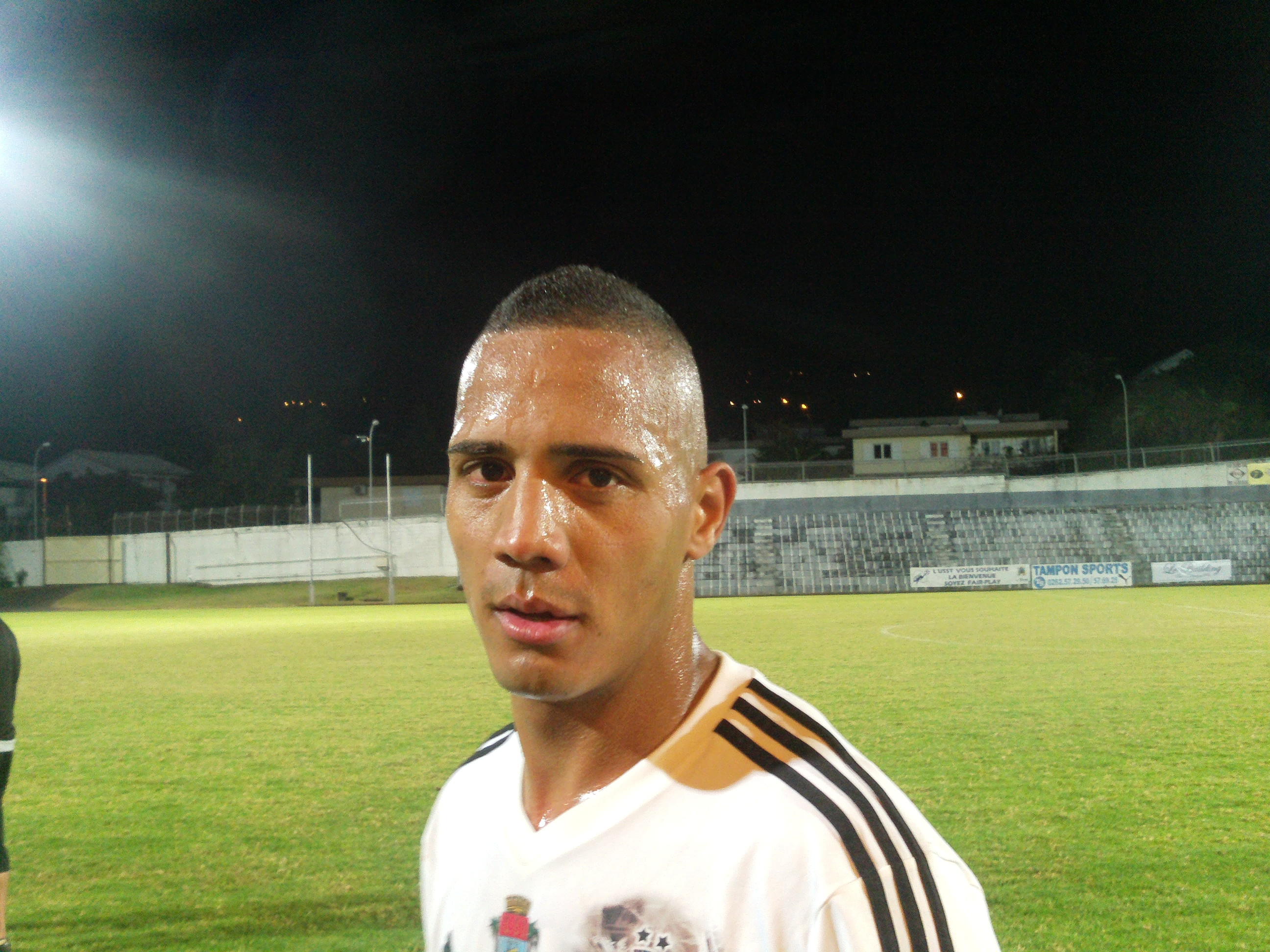
Jean-Michel Fontaine is Réunion's most capped player and top scorer.

Rank	Player	Caps	Goals	Career
1	**Jean-Michel Fontaine**	29	15	2007–present
2	Gérard Hubert	27	1	2003–2015
3	William Mounoussamy	24	1	2003–2015
3	Gaël Payet	24	0	2003–2012
5	Johan Lionel	22	0	2005–2012
6	Éric Farro	21	9	2002–2012
7	**Bertrand Bador**	18	0	2010–present
7	John Elcaman	18	1	2002–2011
7	**Sébastien K'Bidy**	18	0	2011–present
10	Nicolas Hoarau	15	1	2005–2011

=== Top goalscorers ===
Rank	Name	Goals	Caps	Ratio	Career
1	**Jean-Michel Fontaine**	15	29	0.52	2007–present
2	Éric Farro	9	21	0.43	2002–2012
3	Bernard Lacollay	7	9	0.78	1993–2002
3	Mamoudou Diallo	9	9	1	2008–2011
5	Quentin Boesso	4	6	0.67	2008–2015
5	Mickaël Vallant	4	6	0.67	2011–2012
5	Henri-Paul Ah-Yane	4	9	0.44	1979–1986
5	Willy Visnelda	4	13	0.31	2005–2011
9	Eric Bacco	3	3	1	1998
9	Mohamed El Madaghri	3	7	0.43	2011–2012
9	Jean Hugues Tossem	3	8	0.38	1983–1988

== Competitive record ==
=== Indian Ocean Island Games ===
Indian Ocean Island Games record
Year	Round	Position	Pld	W	D*	L	GF	GA
(Réunion) 1979	Champions	1st	4	4	0	0	20	2
(Mauritius) 1985	Runners-up	2nd	3	2	1	0	14	4
(Madagascar) 1990	Group stage	5th	2	0	1	1	0	1
(Seychelles) 1993	Runners-up	2nd	4	3	0	1	5	1
(Réunion) 1998	Champions	1st	4	3	1	0	10	3
(Mauritius) 2003	Runners-up	2nd	4	3	0	1	7	2
(Madagascar) 2007	Champions	1st	4	1	3	0	2	1
(Seychelles) 2011	Third place	3rd	4	2	0	2	4	5
(Réunion) 2015	Champions	1st	4	4	0	0	8	1
(Mauritius) 2019	Champions	1st	5	4	0	1	10	2
(Madagascar) 2023	Runners-up	2nd	4	1	2	1	3	2
Total	5 Titles	11/11	42	27	8	7	83	24

=== Triangulaire ===
Triangulaire record
Year	Round	Position	Pld	W	D*	L	GF	GA
(Madagascar) 1947	Third place	3rd	2	0	0	2	3	6
(Mauritius) 1948	Third place	3rd	2	0	0	2	2	7
(Réunion) 1949	Third place	3rd	2	0	0	2	1	9
(Madagascar) 1950	Runners-up	2nd	2	1	0	1	5	17
(Mauritius) 1951	Third place	3rd	2	0	0	2	3	13
(Réunion) 1952	Third place	3rd	2	0	0	2	0	7
(Madagascar) 1953	Third place	3rd	2	0	0	2	8	15
(Mauritius) 1954	Runners-up	2nd	2	1	0	1	6	13
(Réunion) 1955	Third place	3rd	2	0	0	2	3	7
(Madagascar) 1956	Third place	3rd	2	0	0	2	5	12
(Mauritius) 1957	Runners-up	2nd	2	1	0	1	1	1
(Réunion) 1958	Third Place	3rd	2	0	0	2	1	5
(Madagascar) 1963	Runners-up	2nd	2	1	0	1	3	6
Total	Runners-up	13/13	26	4	0	22	41	118

=== Coupe de l'Outre-Mer ===
Coupe de l'Outre-Mer record
Year	Round	Position	Pld	W	D	L	GF	GA
(France) 2008	Champions	1st	3	3	0	0	9	1
(France) 2010	Runners-up	2nd	4	3	1	0	14	1
(France) 2012	Champions	1st	4	3	1	0	16	3
Total	Champions	3/3	11	9	2	0	39	5

== Head-to-head record ==
- Last update: 7 May 2011 New Caledonia 1–3 Réunion

Opponent	Pld	W	D	L	GF	GA	GD
Comoros	6	4	1	1	13	3	10
Congo	2	1	0	1	3	5	-2
French Guiana	3	2	1	0	3	0	3
Gabon	1	0	0	1	0	3	-3
Guadeloupe	2	1	0	1	3	3	0
Kenya	3	0	0	3	2	7	-5
Madagascar	21	3	4	14	30	53	-23
Malawi	1	0	0	1	2	8	-6
Maldives	2	2	0	0	18	0	18
Martinique	2	1	1	0	1	0	1
Mauritius	35	7	9	19	39	101	-62
Mayotte	4	3	1	0	12	4	8
New Caledonia	2	2	0	0	7	3	4
Saint Pierre and Miquelon	1	1	0	0	11	0	11
Seychelles	15	12	1	2	30	10	20
Tanzania	1	0	1	0	1	1	0
Togo	1	1	0	0	1	0	1
Zaire	1	1	0	0	2	1	1
Zimbabwe	3	0	1	2	3	5	-2
Total	106	41	20	45	181	207	–26

== Honours ==
=== Regional ===
- Indian Ocean Island Games
  - (gold) Gold medal (5): 1979, 1998, 2007, 2015, 2019
  - (silver) Silver medal (4): 1985, 1993, 2003, 2023
  - (bronze) Bronze medal (1): 2011
- Indian Ocean Games Triangulaire
  - (silver) Runners-up (4): 1950, 1954, 1957, 1963
  - (bronze) Third place (9): 1947, 1948, 1949, 1951, 1952, 1953, 1955, 1956, 1958

=== Friendly ===
- Coupe de l'Outre-Mer (2): 2008, 2012
