= Football at the 1990 Indian Ocean Island Games =

Tournament details
- Host country: Madagascar
- Teams: 5 (from 1 confederation)

Final positions
- Champions: Madagascar (1st title)
- Runners-up: Mauritius
- Third place: Seychelles

Tournament statistics
- Matches played: 8
- Goals scored: 24 (3 per match)

1990 Indian Ocean Games in Madagascar

Played in Madagascar.

== Group stage ==
=== Group A ===
| Pos | Team | Pld | W | D | L | GF | GA | GD | Pts | Qualification |
|---|---|---|---|---|---|---|---|---|---|---|
| 1 | Madagascar | 2 | 1 | 1 | 0 | 1 | 0 | +1 | 3 | Advance to knockout stage |
| 2 | Comoros | 2 | 1 | 0 | 1 | 1 | 1 | 0 | 2 | Advance to knockout stage |
| 3 | Réunion | 2 | 0 | 1 | 1 | 0 | 1 | −1 | 1 | |

Source: IOCS

21 August 1990

| Madagascar | 1–0 | Comoros |

23 August 1990

| Réunion | 0–1 | Comoros |

25 August 1990

| Madagascar | 0–0 | Réunion |

=== Group B ===
| Pos | Team | Pld | W | D | L | GF | GA | GD | Pts | Qualification |
|---|---|---|---|---|---|---|---|---|---|---|
| 1 | Mauritius | 1 | 1 | 0 | 0 | 2 | 0 | +2 | 2 | Advance to knockout stage |
| 2 | Seychelles | 1 | 0 | 0 | 1 | 0 | 2 | −2 | 0 | Advance to knockout stage |

Source: IOCS
25 August 1990

| Mauritius | 2–0 | Seychelles |
|---|---|---|
| Ithier ? |

Madagascar

== Knockout stage ==
=== Semifinals ===
27 August 1990

| Mauritius | 4–0 | Comoros |

| Madagascar | 6–0 | Seychelles |

=== Third place match ===
29 August 1990

| Seychelles | 3–1 | Comoros |

=== Final ===
30 August 1990

| Madagascar | 5–1 | Mauritius |
|---|---|---|
| Harry Randrianaivo 14'; Leon dimbindrainy Tipe Andriambololona 33' 47' 67' |

Madagascar

Indian Ocean Games 1990 Winners
Madagascar
1st Title

== See also ==
- Indian Ocean Island Games
- Football at the Indian Ocean Island Games
