= Complexe de Kawani =

Sports venue in Mamoudzou, Mayotte

Coordinates: 12°47′03″S 45°13′18″E

The Complexe de Kawani is a multi-use sports venue in Mamoudzou, Mayotte. Its central feature, the Stade Cavani holds about 5,000 people and serves the Mayotte national football team. The complex also hosts tennis, petanque, athletics, martial arts, and gymnastics.
