= Football at the 1985 Indian Ocean Island Games =

Tournament details
- Host country: Mauritius
- Teams: 6 (from 2 confederations)

Final positions
- Champions: Mauritius (1st title)
- Runners-up: Réunion
- Third place: Comoros

Tournament statistics
- Matches played: 7
- Goals scored: 31 (4.43 per match)

1985 Indian Ocean Games in Mauritius

Played in Mauritius.

== Group stage ==
=== Group A ===
Pos	Team	Pld	W	D	L	GF	GA	GD	Pts	Qualification
1	Mauritius	2	2	0	0	6	2	+4	4	Advance to Final
2	Madagascar	2	1	0	1	2	3	−1	2	Advance to Third place playoff
3	Seychelles	2	0	0	2	1	4	−3	0	

Source: IOCS

27 August 1985

Mauritius	3–1	Seychelles

28 August 1985

Madagascar	1–0	Seychelles

29 August 1985

Mauritius	3–1	Madagascar

=== Group B ===
Pos	Team	Pld	W	D	L	GF	GA	GD	Pts	Qualification
1	Réunion	2	2	0	0	6	2	+4	4	Advance to Final
2	Comoros	2	1	0	1	2	3	−1	2	Advance to Third place playoff
3	Maldives	2	0	0	2	1	4	−3	0	

Source: IOCS

27 August 1985

Réunion	1–0	Comoros

29 August 1985

Comoros	2–2	Maldives

30 August 1985

Réunion	9–0	Maldives

== Knockout stage ==
=== Third place match ===
31 August 1985

Comoros	w/o^{1}	Madagascar

^{1} The match was scratched and Comoros were awarded third place as Madagascar failed to appear at the stadium for the match.

=== Final ===
31 August 1985

Mauritius	4–4 (4 PK 2)	Réunion

Indian Ocean Games 1985 Winners
Mauritius
1st Title

== See also ==
- Indian Ocean Island Games
- Football at the Indian Ocean Island Games
