= Football at the Indian Ocean Island Games =

- Founded: 1947 (1979 in its current format)
- Region: Indian Ocean
- Teams: 7
- Current champions: Réunion
- Most championships: Réunion (5 titles)
- Football at the 2023 Indian Ocean Island Games – Men's tournament

The association football tournament at the Indian Ocean Island Games (French: Jeux des îles de l'océan Indien) which is organised every 4 years for the Islands in the Indian Ocean.

From 1947 until 1963 a precursor called Triangulaire was organized between Madagascar, Mauritius and Réunion Island. The first official edition of Indian Ocean Island Games was held in 1979.

The competition has been won by its host country on seven of the ten occasions it has been held.

== Participants ==
- Comoros
- Madagascar
- Maldives
- Mauritius
- Mayotte
- Réunion
- Seychelles

== Past results ==
Year	Host	Final			Third Place Match
Year	Host	Champion	Score	Second Place	Third Place	Score	Fourth Place
1979; Details	Réunion	Réunion	2–1	Seychelles	Comoros	^{1}	Mauritius
1985; Details	Mauritius	Mauritius	4–4 (4–2 pen.)	Réunion	Comoros	^{2}	Madagascar
1990; Details	Madagascar	Madagascar	5–1	Mauritius	Seychelles	3–1	Comoros
1993; Details	Seychelles	Madagascar	1–0	Réunion	Mauritius	6–2	Seychelles
1998; Details	Réunion	Réunion	3–3 (7–6 pen.)	Madagascar	Seychelles	4–3	Mauritius
2003; Details	Mauritius	Mauritius	2–1	Réunion	Seychelles	2–0	Comoros
2007; Details	Madagascar	Réunion	1–1 (7–6 pen.)	Madagascar	Mayotte	1–1 (4–2 pen.)	Mauritius
2011; Details	Seychelles	Seychelles	1–1 (4–3 pen.)	Mauritius	Réunion	1–0	Mayotte
2015; Details	Réunion	Réunion	3–1	Mayotte	Mauritius	3–1	Madagascar
2019; Details	Mauritius	Réunion	1–1 (1–0 pen.)	Mauritius	Mayotte	3–1	Seychelles
2023; Details	Madagascar	Madagascar	1–0	Réunion	Mauritius}	2–0	Comoros

^{1} The match was scratched and Comoros were awarded third place as Mauritius were unable to travel to Réunion for the match.

^{2} The match was scratched and Comoros were awarded third place as Madagascar failed to appear at the stadium for the match.

== Final Positions ==
Team	Champions	Runners-up	Third-place	Fourth-place	Participation
Réunion	5 (1979, 1998, 2007, 2015, 2019)	4 (1985, 1993, 2003, 2023)	1 (2011)		10
Madagascar	3 (1990, 1993, 2023)	2 (1998, 2007)		2 (1985, 2015)	9
Mauritius	2 (1985, 2003)	3 (1990, 2011, 2019)	3 (1993, 2015, 2023)	3 (1979, 1998, 2007)	10
Seychelles	1 (2011)	1 (1979)	3 (1990, 1998, 2003)	2 (1993, 2019)	10
Mayotte		1 (2015)	2 (2007, 2019)	1 (2011)	5
Comoros			2 (1979, 1985)	3 (1990, 2003, 2023)	10
Maldives					5

== Women's tournament ==
In 2015 a women's tournament was held.

Year	Winner	Runner-up	3rd place	4th place
2015	Réunion	Madagascar	Mayotte	Seychelles
