= Triangulaire =

The Indian Ocean Games Triangulaire was a triangulaire, or tournament between three association football national teams, between Mauritius, Réunion, and Madagascar. It was the predecessor to the Indian Ocean Island Games.

== History ==
The triangulaire was held every year from 1947 until 1958, and then once more in 1963. In 1963, the last game, Mauritius vs Madagascar was abandoned in the 54th minute, which gave Madagascar the win that year. After that, Mauritius did not want to play Madagascar, and the tournament was not held. In the football portion, Mauritius participated along with Réunion, Seychelles, Comoros, and the Maldives. Madagascar did not join until the second Indian Ocean Island Games, which was in Mauritius in 1985. The three triangulaire teams have been to every Indian Ocean Island Games since.

== Past winners ==
Year	Host	Champion	Runner-up	Third Place
1947; Details	Madagascar	Mauritius	Madagascar	Réunion
1948; Details	Mauritius	Mauritius	Madagascar	Réunion
1949; Details	Réunion	Mauritius	Madagascar	Réunion
1950; Details	Madagascar	Mauritius	Réunion	Madagascar
1951; Details	Mauritius	Mauritius	Madagascar	Réunion
1952; Details	Réunion	Mauritius	Madagascar	Réunion
1953; Details	Madagascar	Mauritius	Madagascar	Réunion
1954; Details	Mauritius	Mauritius	Réunion	Madagascar
1955; Details	Réunion	Madagascar	Mauritius	Réunion
1956; Details	Madagascar	Mauritius	Madagascar	Réunion
1957; Details	Mauritius	Mauritius	Réunion	Madagascar
1958; Details	Réunion	Madagascar	Mauritius	Réunion
1963; Details	Madagascar	Madagascar	Réunion	Mauritius

== Final Positions ==
Team	Champions	Runners-up	Third-place
Mauritius	10	2	1
Madagascar	3	7	3
Réunion		4	9

== See also ==
- Mauritius at the Indian Ocean Games Triangulaire
