= Giovanni Jeannot =

Mauritian footballer

Personal information
- Full name: Giovanni Jeannot
- Date of birth: 13 October 1982 (age 44)
- Place of birth: Mauritius
- Position: Striker

Team information
- Current team: AS Port-Louis 2000

Senior career*
Years	Team	Apps	(Gls)
2004–	AS Port-Louis 2000	?	(?)

International career
2004–2007	Mauritius	20	(0)
- * Club domestic league appearances and goals

Giovanni Jeannot (French: [dʒoˈvani ʒano]; born 13 October 1982) is a Mauritian footballer who currently plays as a striker for AS Port-Louis 2000. He won 20 caps for the Mauritius national football team between 2004 and 2007.
