= Saint Pierre and Miquelon national football team =

Saint Pierre and Miquelon
- Nickname: "l'Amérique européenne"
- Association: Ligue de football de Saint-Pierre-et-Miquelon
- Head coach: Yannick Laffont
- Most caps: Xavier Delamaire (4)
- Top scorer: Xavier Delamaire (1)
- Home stadium: Stade John Girardin
- FIFA code: SPM
First colours	Second colours

First international
- Réunion 11–0 Saint Pierre and Miquelon (Saint-Gratien, France; 22 September 2010)

Biggest win
- None

Biggest defeat
- Saint Pierre and Miquelon 1–16 New Caledonia (Clairefontaine, France; 28 September 2012)

Coupe de l'Outre-Mer
- Appearances: 2 (first in 2010)
- Best result: Eighth place (2012)

The Saint Pierre and Miquelon national football team is the official football team for Saint Pierre and Miquelon. As an overseas collectivity of France, it is affiliated to the FFF. Saint Pierre and Miquelon's first official match was an 11–0 defeat to Réunion in the 2010 Coupe de l'Outre-Mer, a competition for teams representing the Overseas departments and territories of France.

== CONCACAF membership ==
Unlike most of the other teams representing French territories in the Western Hemisphere, Saint Pierre and Miquelon is not a member of CONCACAF and therefore does not participate in competitions such as the CONCACAF Gold Cup or CONCACAF Nations League. However, in October 2019 the territory announced its intentions to build a suitable venue and join the organization. It was expected to become a member in September 2022, however they did not join. An official request to CONCACAF had already been submitted by October 2019. League president Herve Huet was then set to meet with CONCACAF president Victor Montagliani in May 2020. As of September 2025, the association was still awaiting on CONCACAF's decision on membership for Saint Pierre and Miquelon.

== Complete international results ==
Although they had played unofficial matches as early as 2005, Saint Pierre and Miquelon's first official match was an 11–0 defeat to Réunion in the 2010 Coupe de l'Outre-Mer, a competition for teams representing the Overseas departments and territories of France. Kevin Mathiaud and Xavier Delamaire scored Saint Pierre and Miquelon's first and second-ever goals, respectively, during the 2012 edition of the tournament after the team was held scoreless two years earlier. Despite planning to hold a 2014 competition, the FFF has dissolved the tournament, citing the excessive cost. Saint Pierre and Miquelon has not played an official match since.

Saint Pierre and Miquelon's score is shown first in each case.

No.	Date	Venue	Opponents	Score	Competition	Saint Pierre and Miquelon scorers	Att.	Ref.
1	22 September 2010	Stade Michel Hidalgo, Saint-Gratien (N)	Réunion	0–11	2010 Coupe de l'Outre-Mer		—	
2	25 September 2010	Parc des Sports Louis Boury, Gennevilliers (N)	French Guiana	0–7	2010 Coupe de l'Outre-Mer		—	
3	28 September 2010	Stade Jean Rolland, Franconville (N)	Mayotte	0–10	2010 Coupe de l'Outre-Mer		—	
4	22 September 2012	Stade de Montbauron, Versailles (N)	Guadeloupe	0–13	2012 Coupe de l'Outre-Mer		300	
5	24 September 2012	Stade Bauer, Saint-Ouen-sur-Seine (N)	Réunion	0–10	2012 Coupe de l'Outre-Mer		200	
6	26 September 2012	Parc des Sports, Saint-Ouen-l'Aumône (N)	French Guiana	1–11	2012 Coupe de l'Outre-Mer	Mathiaud	50	
7	28 September 2012	INF Clairefontaine, Clairefontaine-en-Yvelines (N)	New Caledonia	1–16	2012 Coupe de l'Outre-Mer	Delamaire	50	

=== Record by opponent ===
Team	Pld	W	D	L	GF	GA	GD	WPCT
French Guiana	2	0	0	2	1	18	−17	0.00
Guadeloupe	1	0	0	1	0	13	−13	0.00
Mayotte	1	0	0	1	0	10	−10	0.00
New Caledonia	1	0	0	1	1	16	−15	0.00
Réunion	2	0	0	2	0	21	−21	0.00
Total	7	0	0	7	2	78	−76	0.00

Source: Results

== Current squad ==
This squad was selected for the 2012 Coupe de l'Outre-Mer.

No.	Pos.	Player	Date of birth (age)	Caps	Goals	Club
1	GK	Olivier Morel	November 21, 1984 (age 41)		0	(Ligue de football de Saint-Pierre-et-Miquelon) A.S. Miquelonnaise
16	GK	Simon Hebditch	August 5, 1993 (age 32)		0	(Ligue de football de Saint-Pierre-et-Miquelon) A.S. Saint Pierraise
2	DF	Rémi Audouze	November 9, 1993 (age 32)		0	(Ligue de football de Saint-Pierre-et-Miquelon) A.S. Ilienne Amateur
14	DF	Jean-Baptiste Borotra	February 2, 1994 (age 32)		0	(Ligue de football de Saint-Pierre-et-Miquelon) A.S. Saint Pierraise
4	DF	Ivan Dos Santos	November 7, 1988 (age 37)		0	(Ligue de football de Saint-Pierre-et-Miquelon) A.S. Miquelonnaise
15	DF	Kevin Mathiaud	April 14, 1990 (age 36)		1	(Ligue de football de Saint-Pierre-et-Miquelon) A.S. Miquelonnaise
3	DF	Gary Urdanabia	September 1, 1983 (age 42)		0	(Ligue de football de Saint-Pierre-et-Miquelon) A.S. Ilienne Amateur
7	MF	Xavier Delamaire	June 5, 1985 (age 40)		1	(Ligue de football de Saint-Pierre-et-Miquelon) A.S. Ilienne Amateur
8	MF	Maxime Gautier	September 1, 1990 (age 35)		0	(Ligue de football de Saint-Pierre-et-Miquelon) A.S. Ilienne Amateur
6	MF	Matthieu Demontreux	October 23, 1992 (age 33)		0	(Ligue de football de Saint-Pierre-et-Miquelon) A.S. Saint Pierraise
11	MF	Nicolas Lemaine	May 7, 1995 (age 30)		0	(Ligue de football de Saint-Pierre-et-Miquelon) A.S. Miquelonnaise
13	MF	Aymeric Tillard	December 22, 1988 (age 37)		0	(Ligue de football de Saint-Pierre-et-Miquelon) A.S. Ilienne Amateur
5	MF	Tristan Girardin	October 18, 1995 (age 30)		0	(Ligue de football de Saint-Pierre-et-Miquelon) A.S. Saint Pierraise
9	FW	Mickaël Lucas	July 4, 1984 (age 41)		0	(Ligue de football de Saint-Pierre-et-Miquelon) A.S. Miquelonnaise
10	FW	Olivier Blanchet	May 2, 1992 (age 33)		0	(Ligue de football de Saint-Pierre-et-Miquelon) A.S. Ilienne Amateur
17	FW	Guillaume Revert	December 1, 1994 (age 31)		0	(Ligue de football de Saint-Pierre-et-Miquelon) A.S. Ilienne Amateur
12	FW	Martin Disnard	February 1, 1994 (age 32)		0	(Ligue de football de Saint-Pierre-et-Miquelon) A.S. Ilienne Amateur

== Notable players ==
- (Saint Pierre and Miquelon) Yannis Bègue – former professional with Albion Rovers and Raith Rovers
- (Saint Pierre and Miquelon) Xavier Delamaire – national team top scorer and most capped player

== Player records ==
As of 28 September 2012

Most appearances
Rank	Name	Caps	Goals	Career
1	Xavier Delamaire	4	1	2010–2012
1	Maxime Gautier	4	0	2010–2012
1	Rémi Audouze	4	0	2010–2012
1	Matthieu Demontreux	4	0	2010–2012
5	Simon Hebditch	3	0	2010–2012
5	Gary Urdanabia	3	0	2010–2012
5	Ivan dos Santos	3	0	2010–2012
5	Tristan Girardin	3	0	2010–2012
5	Nicolas Lemaine	3	0	2010–2012
5	Aymeric Tillard	3	0	2010–2012
5	Mickaël Lucas	3	0	2010–2012
5	Olivier Blanchet	3	0	2010–2012
5	Martin Disnard	3	0	2010–2012

Top goalscorers
Rank	Name	Goals	Caps	Ratio	Career
1	Kevin Mathiaud	1	2	0.5	2010–2012
1	Xavier Delamaire	1	4	0.25	2010–2012
