= Stade Dominique Duvauchelle =

Multi-use stadium in Créteil, France

Stade Dominique-Duvauchelle
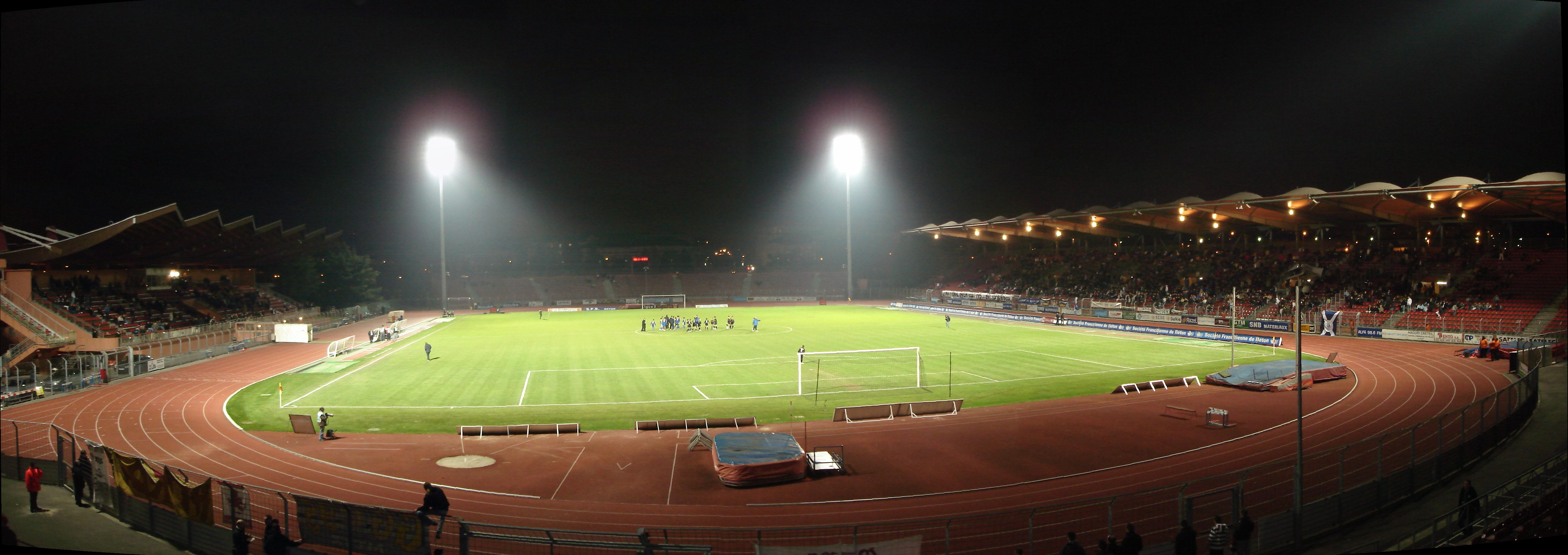
- Interactive map of Stade Dominique-Duvauchelle
- Location: Créteil, France
- Coordinates: 48°46′5″N 2°27′42″E
- Capacity: 12,150
- Surface: grass

Construction
- Opened: September 23, 1983
- Renovated: 1999, 2004

Tenant
- US Créteil-Lusitanos

Stade Dominique Duvauchelle is a multi-use stadium in Créteil, France. It takes its name from a local sports journalist who died shortly before the stadium's inauguration. It is currently used mostly for football matches and is the home stadium of US Créteil-Lusitanos. The stadium was built with an original capacity of approximately 6,000. It increased its capacity to 12,150 people in February 2006.

Its record attendance for a league match was for a match between Créteil and Saint Etienne on 5 August 2001 with 6325 spectators. The record for a cup match is 8000 in a match hosted there by amateur team US Lusitanos Saint-Maur against Bordeaux in the round of 32 of the French Cup on 19 January 2002.

== See also ==
- List of football stadiums in France
- Lists of stadiums
