= Mario Miradji =

Malagasy footballer

Personal information
- Date of birth: 20 June 1984 (age 42)
- Position: Midfielder

Senior career*
Years	Team	Apps	(Gls)
2005–2014	Ecoredipharm		

International career
2007	Madagascar	6	(3)
- * Club domestic league appearances and goals

Mario Miradji (born 20 June 1984) is a retired Malagasy football midfielder.
