= Mahamasina Municipal Stadium =

Sports venue in Antananarivo, Madagascar

Coordinates: 18°55′9.70″S 47°31′32.47″E

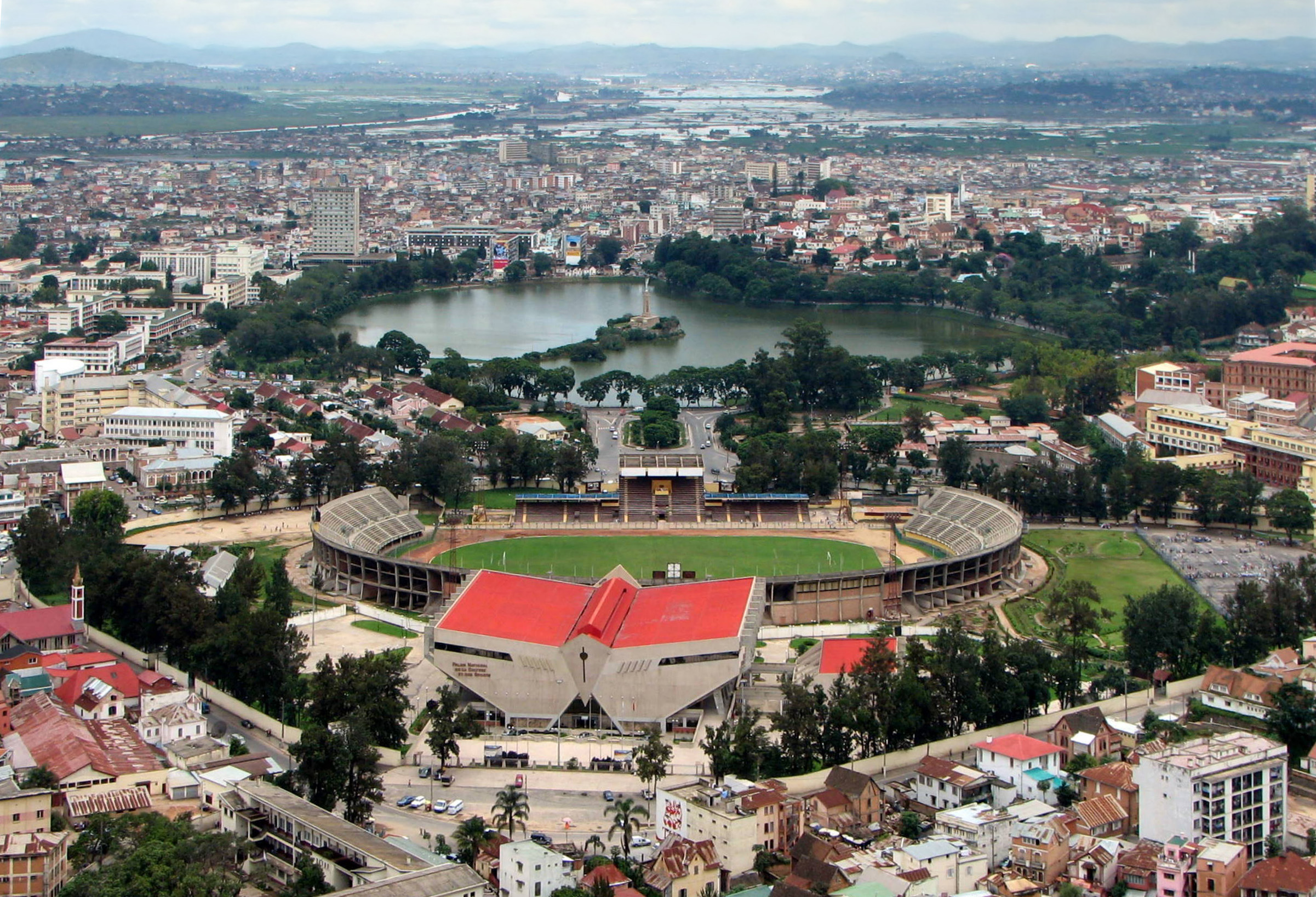
- Interactive map of Mahamasina Municipal Stadium
- Location: Antananarivo, Madagascar
- Capacity: 40,880
- Field size: 100 m^{2}

Construction
- Built: 1970
- Opened: 1970
- Renovated: 2021

Tenants
- Madagascar national football team Madagascar national rugby team

Kianja Barea Mahamasina is a rugby union and football (multi-purpose) stadium, also used for concerts and athletics, in Antananarivo, Madagascar. Initially opened in 1970, the building was rebuilt and expanded before being reopened on 2 September 2021.

== Usage ==
It is used mostly for rugby and football matches. The stadium has a 40,880 capacity for football and rugby matches.

== Incidents ==
In 2005, the stadium was the site of a stampede that killed two people during a match between South African side Kaizer Chiefs and Madagascar's USJF Ravinala. It was also the stadium of the 2007 Indian Ocean Games.

On 25 January, 2014, a grenade thrown at the stadium during a musical production killed one child and wounded 33.

On 26 June, 2016, during a free concert, a bomb detonated in the stadium, killing two people and injuring around 80.

On 8 September, 2018, a stampede to enter the stadium killed one person and injured 37. Long queues had formed to see the 2019 Africa Cup of Nations qualification match against Senegal with some news sources stating that there had been lines kilometers long vying to enter the stadium from its only entrance.

On 26 June, 2019, at least 16 people were killed and 101 injured in a human crush before the concert of Rossy at the stadium on independence day. The show was about to start, and people heard that they could enter the stadium, but the police had left the doors closed. People tried to force the doors but they remained closed; the crowd kept pushing.

On 26 August, 2023, at least 12 people died during a crush incident at the stadium, during the opening of Indian Ocean Island Games.

== Malagasy stadiums ==
The Mahamasina Municipal Stadium is the largest stadium in Madagascar.

Stadium	City	Capacity	Home team
Mahamasina Municipal Stadium	Antananarivo	40,880	Madagascar
Kianja Barikadimy	Toamasina	25,000	
Stade CNaPS Sport	Toamasina	15,000	
