= Stade Jean-Ivoula =

Coordinates: 20°53′42″S 55°30′05″E

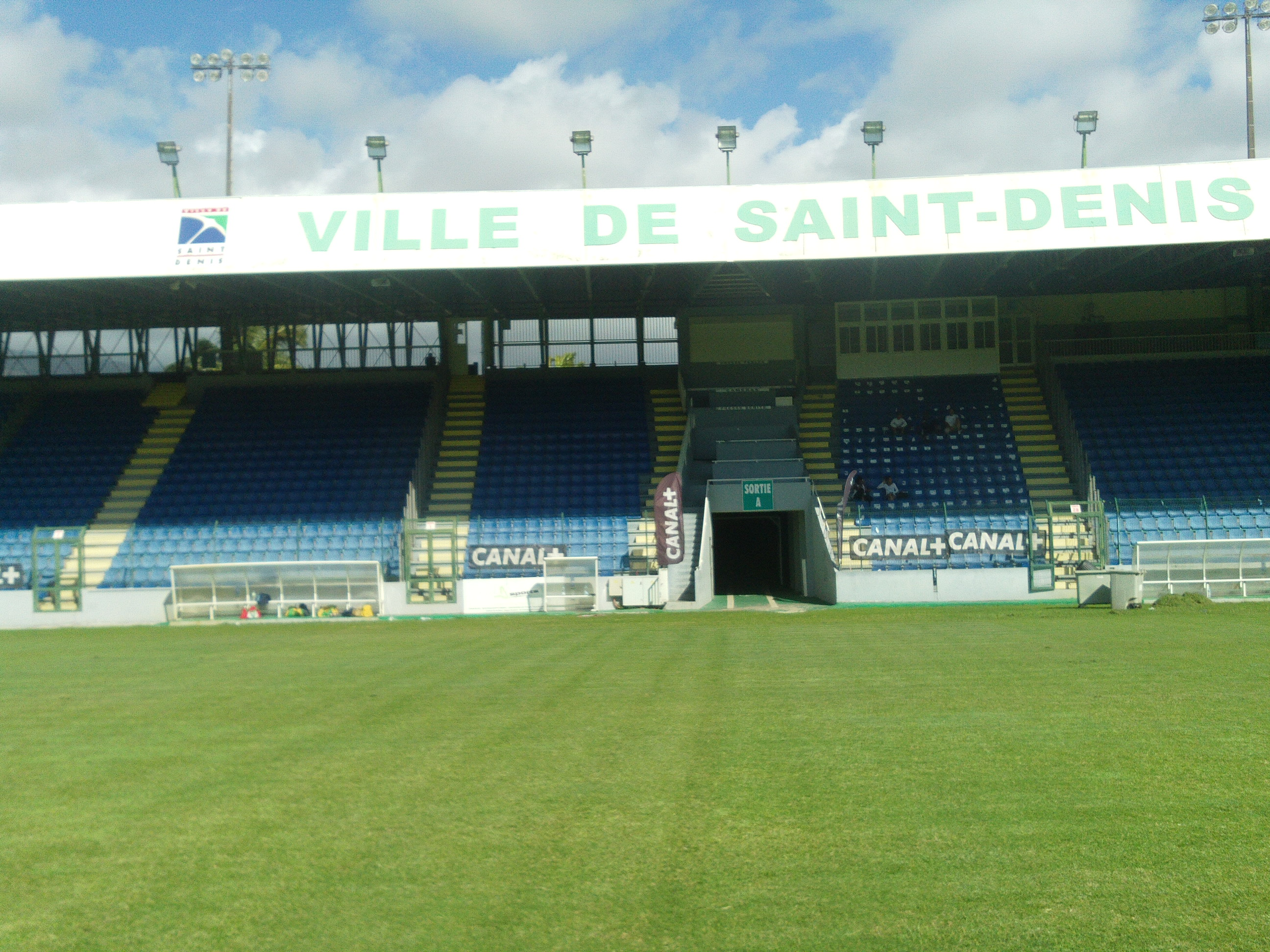
Stade Jean Ivoula

The Stade Jean-Ivoula, colloquially known as Stade de l'Est, is a multi-use stadium in Saint-Denis, Réunion. It is currently used mostly for football matches. The stadium holds 7,500.

== See also ==
- Réunion national football team
