= Coupe T.O.M. =

Association football tournament

Coupe T.O.M or The Pacific French Territories Cup is a cup competed for by clubs from Tahiti and New Caledonia. T.O.M. stands for Territoires d'Outre-Mer, which includes Tahiti and New Caledonia. The other two T.O.M.s are Wallis and Futuna, whose standard of football is much lower, and the Southern and Antarctic Lands, which are uninhabited except for scientific personnel. All inhabited T.O.M.s are now called C.O.M.s, French: collectivités d'outre-mer or overseas collectivities). The winners qualify for the Outremer Champions Cup.

== Previous winners ==
Year	Final		
Year	Champion	Result	Runner-Up
1996	AS Manu-Ura (TAH)	1–2, 3–0	JS Traput (NCL)
1997	AS Vénus (TAH)	0–0, 1–1 (5–4 pens)	JS Baco (NCL)
1998	AS Vénus (TAH)	4–0, 6–2	AS Poum (NCL)
1999	AS Vénus (TAH)	0–0, 2–1	FC Gaïtcha (NCL)
2000	AS Vénus (TAH)	2–0, 2–1	JS Baco (NCL)
2001	AS Pirae (TAH)	3–2, 3–1	JS Baco (NCL)
2002	AS Vénus (TAH)	0–0, 1–0	AS Mont-Dore (NCL)
2003	AS Magenta (NCL)	2–2, 2–2 (4–3 pens)	AS Pirae (TAH)
2004	AS Manu-Ura (TAH)	1–1, 2–1	AS Magenta (NCL)
2005	AS Magenta (NCL)	4–1, 3–1	AS Tefana (TAH)
2006	AS Tefana (TAH)	2–0, 0–0	AS Mont-Dore (NCL)
2007	AS Pirae (TAH)	3–0, 2–2	JS Baco (NCL)
