= 2007 Indian Ocean Island Games =

- Host: Madagascar
- Teams: 7 islands
- Events: 15
- Opening: 9 August 2007
- Closing: 19 August 2007
- Opened by: Marc Ravalomanana

The 2007 Indian Ocean Island Games commonly known as Les septieme Jeux des iles de L'Ocean Indien in French was the 7th edition of the competition, held in Antananarivo, Madagascar. The last edition was held in 2003 in Mauritius. The next edition took place in Seychelles in 2011. It was the second time Madagascar organized these games after the 1990 Indian Ocean Islands Games. The mascot of the games was a ravenala plant (which is a symbol of Madagascar) named Ravi

== Teams participated ==
7 islands, all located in the Indian Ocean, participated in the 2007 Indian Ocean Island Games.

- Comoros
- Madagascar
- Maldives
- Mauritius
- Mayotte
- Réunion
- Seychelles

== Sports ==
- Athletics
- Basketball
- Boxing
- Cycling
- Football
- Judo
- Karate
- Pétanque
- Swimming
- Table tennis
- Taekwondo
- Tennis
- Volleyball
- Weightlifting
- Wrestling

== Medal table ==
=== General table ===
* Host nation (Madagascar)

Rank	Nation	Gold	Silver	Bronze	Total
1	Madagascar*	100	79	56	235
2	Réunion	74	78	74	226
3	Mauritius	35	55	83	173
4	Seychelles	35	27	37	99
5	Comoros	1	6	14	21
6	Mayotte	0	0	4	4
7	Maldives	0	0	0	0
Totals (7 entries)		245	245	268	758

== Sources ==
- https://web.archive.org/web/20110904022816/http://www.jioi2007.mg/
- https://web.archive.org/web/20120326173805/http://www.jioi2007.mg/site_global/mascotte.php
- https://web.archive.org/web/20120326173838/http://www.jioi2007.mg/site_global/classpardiscipline.php
- https://web.archive.org/web/20120326173819/http://www.jioi2007.mg/site_global/classement.php
