= Stade Michel Volnay =

Coordinates: 21.3387°S 55.4681°E

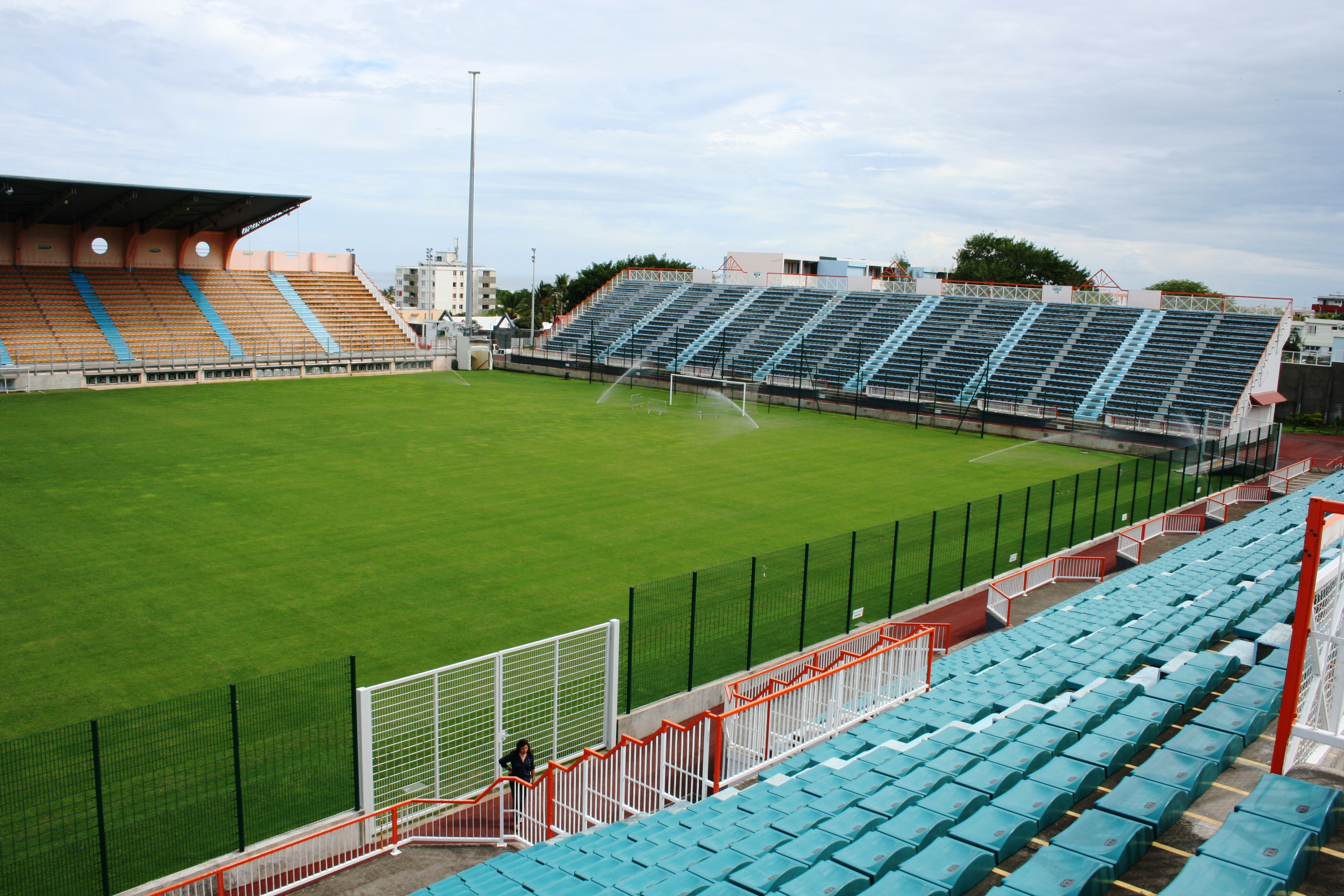
Stade-Michel-Volnay

The Stade Michel-Volnay is a multi-use stadium in Saint-Pierre, Réunion. It is currently used mostly for football matches and serves as the home stadium for JS Saint-Pierroise. The stadium holds 8,010 people.
