= Indian Ocean Island Games =

Quadrennial multi-sport event from Indian Ocean island nations

- Purpose: Multi-sport event for islands in the Indian Ocean
- Frequency: Every 4 years (expected)
- Inaugurated: 1979 Indian Ocean Island Games
- Most recent: 2023 Indian Ocean Island Games

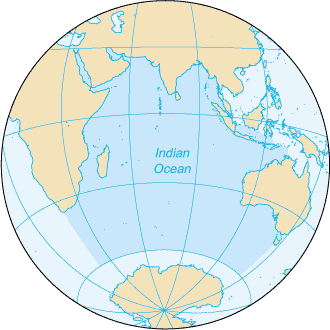
Extent of the Indian Ocean according to the International Hydrographic Organization

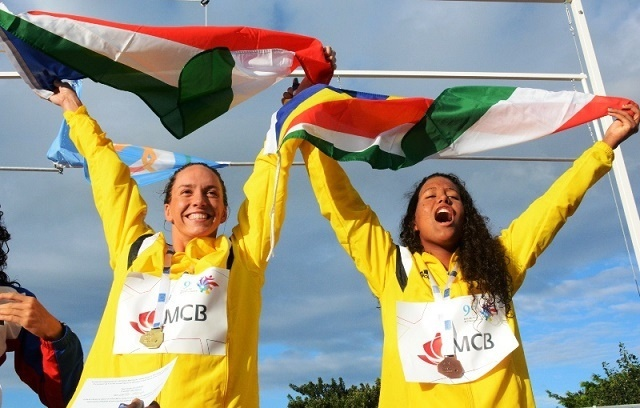
Seselwa swimmers Alexus Laird (left) and Felicity Passon after winning the gold and bronze medals in the 50-metre backstroke at the 9th IOIG

The Indian Ocean Island Games (French: Jeux des îles de l'océan Indien) is a quadrennial multi-sport event from Indian Ocean island nations. The Games was created by the International Olympic Committee (IOC) in 1977 and currently gather the island nations and territories of Mauritius, Seychelles, Comoros, Madagascar, Mayotte, Réunion and the Maldives. The number of athletes who participate has increased over the years, it went from 1000 athletes in 1979 to over 1500 participants in 2003 and 2007 and over 2000 participants in 2019.

== Origins ==
From 1947 until 1963, a precursor called Indian Ocean Games Triangulaire was organized between Madagascar, Mauritius and Réunion. In 1963, a football match in Madagascar between Mauritius and Madagascar was abandoned at 1–1 after 54 minutes, and Madagascar declared themselves as winners of the tournament. After this match Mauritius refused to play and the tournament was not held again.

In 1974, the Regional Olympic Committee of Réunion decide to organise a multi-sport competition in the Indian Ocean. This was adopted by the International Olympic Committee in 1976. The competition was initially called the 'Indian Ocean Games', but the name was changed to the 'Indian Ocean Island Games' before the first games, without the participation of Sri Lanka, which was initially included.

The objectives of the games are to contribute to regional cooperation through the development of sport in the region; build friendship and mutual understanding between the peoples of the islands of the Indian Ocean, in the spirit of Olympism; allow athletes to have, every four years, a competition whose interest and level are commensurate with the real sport of the region; and create a regional event whose repercussions will ensure the development of infrastructure of countries in the area. In 2019 the games involve 7 islands, 14 disciplines and 2,000 athletes.

== IOIG Games ==
Five countries participated in the creation of the Games: Sri Lanka, Seychelles, Mauritius, Comoros and Reunion. They drafted the Charter of the Games. Originally, the Games were to take place every four years, however this frequency was not observed from 1979 to 2003.

Year	Edition	Date	Host country	Host city	Sports	Events	Reference
1979	1		Réunion	Saint Denis	13	111	
1985	2		Mauritius	Curepipe	13	120	
1990	3		Madagascar	Antananarivo	14	151	
1993	4		Seychelles	Victoria	13	164	
1998	5		Réunion	Saint Denis	16	176	
2003	6	29 August – 3 September	Mauritius	Moka	13	194	
2007	7	9–19 August	Madagascar	Antananarivo	15	245	
2011	8	5–14 August	Seychelles	Victoria	12	187	
2015	9	1–8 August	Réunion	Saint Denis	14	214	
2019	10	19–28 July	Mauritius	Port Louis	13	223	
2023	11	23 August – 3 September	Madagascar	Antananarivo	20	315	
2027	12	Future event	Comoros	Moroni			
2029	13	Future event	Maldives	Malé			

== CJSOI Games ==
The Indian Ocean Youth and Sport Commission (CJSOI) Games. 13th of Indian Ocean Island Youth Games was held in 2025.

XIII CJSOI Games, was held in Seychelles from August 1 to August 10. The games will feature 11 sporting events, including football (U17), athletics, swimming, and more. This will be the third time Seychelles has hosted the games, having previously done so in 1999 and 2008.

== Participating countries ==
	(Réunion) 1979	(Mauritius) 1985	(Madagascar) 1990	(Seychelles) 1993	(Réunion) 1998	(Mauritius) 2003	(Madagascar) 2007	(Seychelles) 2011	(Réunion) 2015	(Mauritius) 2019	Total
Comoros	✓	✓	✓	✓	✓	✓	✓	✓	✗	✓	9
Madagascar	✗	✓	✓	✓	✓	✓	✓	✓	✓	✓	9
Maldives	✓	✓	✓	✓	✓	✓	✓	✓	✓	✓	10
Mauritius	✓	✓	✓	✓	✓	✓	✓	✓	✓	✓	10
Mayotte	✗	✗	✗	✗	✗	✓	✓	✓	✓	✓	5
Réunion	✓	✓	✓	✓	✓	✓	✓	✓	✓	✓	10
Seychelles	✓	✓	✓	✓	✓	✓	✓	✓	✓	✓	10

- Mauritius includes the islands of Rodrigues and Agaléga.
- In 2003, Mayotte participated together with Réunion as France Indian Ocean.

== Events ==
- Athletics
- Badminton
- Basketball
- Boxing
- Cycling
- Football
- Handball
- Judo
- Karate
- Pétanque
- Rugby
- Sailing
- Swimming
- Table tennis
- Taekwondo
- Tennis
- Volleyball
- Weightlifting
- Wrestling

== All-time medal table ==
As of 2015.

Rank	Nation	Gold	Silver	Bronze	Total
1	Réunion	664	624	535	1,823
2	Mauritius	496	551	607	1,654
3	Madagascar	474	410	451	1,335
4	Seychelles	225	234	280	739
5	Comoros	9	21	64	94
6	Maldives	6	16	28	50
7	Mayotte	5	19	33	57
Totals (7 entries)		1,879	1,875	1,998	5,752

2003 France Indian Ocean medals have been counted for Réunion.

== See also ==
- Indian Ocean Games Triangulaire
- Island Games
- Southern African Games (CUCSA Games)
- Central African Games
- East African Community Games (EACoG)
- East African Schools Games (FEASSSA Games)
- West African Games
