= Seychelles national football team results =

The Seychelles national football team represents the Seychelles in international football under the control of the Seychelles Football Federation (SFF). The football association was founded in 1980 and became fully affiliated to FIFA and the Confederation of African Football (CAF) in 1986.

The following list contains all results of the Seychelles' official matches since joining FIFA and the CAF.

Contents
- 1986
- 1987
- 1988
- 1989
- 1990
- 1992
- 1993
- 1994
- 1996
- 1998
- 2000
- 2002
- 2003
- 2005
- 2006
- 2007
- 2008
- 2009
- 2011
- 2012
- 2013
- 2014
- 2015
- 2016
- 2017
- 2018
- 2019
- 2020
- 2021
- 2022
- 2023
- 2024
- 2025
- 2026

- Key
- All-time record
- See also
- References
- External links

== Key ==
The coloured backgrounds denote the result of the match:

– indicates Seychelles won the match
– indicates Seychelles's opposition won the match
– indicates the match ended in a draw

== FIFA results ==
=== 1986 ===
31 August 1986 1987 All-Africa Games qualification	Seychelles	1–2	Mauritius	Victoria, Seychelles
		Report		Stadium: People's Stadium

14 September 1986 1987 All-Africa Games qualification	Mauritius	2–0	Seychelles	Curepipe, Mauritius
		Report		Stadium: Stade George V

=== 1987 ===
14 June 1987 Friendly	Congo	1–1	Seychelles	Réunion
		Report

16 June 1987 Friendly	Madagascar	2–0	Seychelles	Réunion
		Report

21 June 1987 Friendly	Réunion	3–1	Seychelles	Réunion
		Report

=== 1988 ===
9 June 1988 Friendly	Seychelles	1–1	Tanzania	Victoria, Seychelles
		Report		Stadium: People's Stadium

2 October 1988 1990 African Cup of Nations qualification	Mauritius	3–0	Seychelles	Curepipe, Mauritius
	Rajesh Ganesh 3', 29'; Willy Vincent 52'	Report		Stadium: Stade George V

16 October 1988 1990 African Cup of Nations qualification	Seychelles	1–0	Mauritius	Victoria, Seychelles
	Bernard Dorasamy 66'	Report		Stadium: People's Stadium

=== 1989 ===
6 June 1989 Friendly	Seychelles	1–2	Mauritius	Victoria, Seychelles
		Report		Stadium: People's Stadium

=== 1990 ===
25 August 1990 1990 Indian Ocean Island Games	Mauritius	2–0	Seychelles	Antananarivo, Madagascar
	Jean-Marc Ithier; Patrice D'Avrincourt	Report

27 August 1990 1990 Indian Ocean Island Games	Madagascar	6–0	Seychelles	Antananarivo, Madagascar
	Léon 9'; Setra Rafanodina 13', 61'; Jean-Paul 36'; Solobé 40', 59'	Report

29 August 1990 1990 Indian Ocean Island Games	Comoros	1–2	Seychelles	Antananarivo, Madagascar
	Ahamoda 36'	Report	Bernard Toussaint 42'; Robin Mousbé 51'

=== 1992 ===
16 October 1992 1992 CECAFA Cup	Tanzania B	3–0	Seychelles	Arusha, Tanzania
		Report		Stadium: Sheikh Amri Abeid Memorial Stadium

18 October 1992 1992 CECAFA Cup	Kenya	2–1	Seychelles	Arusha, Tanzania
	Abbass Magongo 40'; ???	Report	Judy Muhidin 51'	Stadium: Sheikh Amri Abeid Memorial Stadium

21 October 1992 1992 CECAFA Cup	Uganda	5–2	Seychelles	Arusha, Tanzania
	Jackson Mayanja 2'; George Ssemogerere 48' (pen.); Chembe 51'; Issa Ssekatawa 78'; Yassim 81'	Report	Mosehl 11'; Paul Rose 19'	Stadium: Sheikh Amri Abeid Memorial Stadium

=== 1993 ===
22 August 1993 1993 Indian Ocean Island Games	Seychelles	0–2	Réunion	Victoria, Seychelles
		Report	Yannis Brennus 4'; Bernard Lacollay 47'	Stadium: Stade Linité

24 August 1993 1993 Indian Ocean Island Games	Seychelles	0–2	Réunion	Victoria, Seychelles
		Report	Jimmy Moultanin 3'; Eric Sellambarom 24'	Stadium: Stade Linité

26 August 1993 1993 Indian Ocean Island Games	Seychelles	1–2	Madagascar	Victoria, Seychelles
	Ralph Jean-Louis 43'	Report	Fidy Rasoanaivo 70'; Setra Rafanodina 77'	Stadium: Stade Linité

28 August 1993 1993 Indian Ocean Island Games	Seychelles	2–6	Mauritius	Victoria, Seychelles
	Robin Mousbé 37'; Ralph Jean-Louis 39'	Report	Antoine Mocude 50', 61'; Cyril Lebon 56', 68'; Tony François 46'; Dany Esmyot 83'	Stadium: Stade Linité

=== 1994 ===
29 November 1994 1994 CECAFA Cup	Eritrea	1–0	Seychelles	Mumias, Kenya
	Yidnekachew Shitenew 12'	Report		Stadium: Mumias Sports Complex

1 December 1994 1994 CECAFA Cup	Uganda	2–0	Seychelles	Kasarani, Kenya
	Umar Senoga 41', 76'	Report		Stadium: Moi International Sports Centre

1 December 1994 1994 CECAFA Cup	Kenya B	3–2	Seychelles	Mumias, Kenya
	???; ???; ???	Report	Paul Khan 20'; Ralph Jean-Louis 83'	Stadium: Mumias Sports Complex

=== 1996 ===
11 August 1996 1998 African Cup of Nations qualification	Mauritius	1–0	Seychelles	Belle Vue Harel, Mauritius
	Jean-Sébastien Bax 25'	Report		Stadium: Anjalay Stadium

24 August 1996 1998 African Cup of Nations qualification	Seychelles	1–1	Mauritius	Victoria, Seychelles
	Paul Rose 50'	Report	Ashley Mocudé 20'	Stadium: Stade Linité

=== 1998 ===
6 June 1998 Friendly	Kenya	1–1	Seychelles	Kasarani, Kenya
	???	Report	???	Stadium: Moi International Sports Centre

13 June 1998 Friendly	Seychelles	0–1	Kenya	Victoria, Seychelles
		Report	???	Stadium: Stade Linité

9 August 1998 1998 Indian Ocean Island Games	Comoros	0–3	Seychelles	Saint-Pierre, Réunion
		Report	???; ???; ???	Stadium: Stade Michel Volnay

11 August 1998 1998 Indian Ocean Island Games	Madagascar	5–2	Seychelles	Saint-Pierre, Réunion
	Dieudonné Ratovonirina 20', 48'; Harry Randrianaivo 23', 44'; Ruphin Menakely 36'	Report	Paul Khan 41'; Alpha Baldé 76'	Stadium: Stade Michel Volnay

13 August 1998 1998 Indian Ocean Island Games	Seychelles	0–2	Réunion	Victoria, Seychelles
		Report	Eric Bacco 61' (pen.); Bernard Lacollay 75'	Stadium: Stade Linité

15 August 1998 1998 Indian Ocean Island Games	Seychelles	4–3	Mauritius	Victoria, Seychelles
	Alpha Baldé 35'; Verna Rose 46'; Dany Rose 55'; Philip Zialor 73'	Report	Tony François 30'; Robert Rateau 32', 74'	Stadium: Stade Linité

=== 2000 ===
8 April 2000 2002 FIFA World Cup qualification	Seychelles	1–1	Namibia	Victoria, Seychelles
	Philip Zialor 28'	Report	Eliphas Shivute 20'	Stadium: Stade Linité

22 April 2000 2002 FIFA World Cup qualification	Namibia	3–0	Seychelles	Windhoek, Namibia
	Razundara Tjikuzu 7', 13', 79'	Report		Stadium: Independence Stadium

1 July 2000 2002 African Cup of Nations qualification	Seychelles	0–1	Zimbabwe	Victoria, Seychelles
		Report	Benjani Mwaruwari 35'	Stadium: Stade Linité

16 July 2000 2002 African Cup of Nations qualification	Zimbabwe	5–0	Seychelles	Bulawayo, Zimbabwe
	Blessing Makunike 10'; Luke Petros Jukulile 22', 32'; Peter Ndlovu 40'; Nqobizitha Ncube 86'	Report		Stadium: Barbourfields Stadium

=== 2002 ===
8 September 2002 2004 African Cup of Nations qualification	Seychelles	1–0	Eritrea	Victoria, Seychelles
	Roddy Victor 50'	Report		Stadium: Stade Linité

26 September 2002 Friendly	Mauritius	1–0	Seychelles	Centre de Flacq, Mauritius
	Jean-Noël Laboiteuse 70'	Report		Stadium: Stade Auguste Vollaire

13 October 2002 2004 African Cup of Nations qualification	Mali	3–0	Seychelles	Bamako, Mali
	Seydou Keita 32'; Djibril Sidibé 75'; Dramane Coulibaly 85'	Report		Stadium: Stade du 26 Mars

=== 2003 ===
30 March 2003 2004 African Cup of Nations qualification	Zimbabwe	3–1	Seychelles	Harare, Zimbabwe
	Peter Ndlovu 20' (pen.), 91' (pen.); Adam Ndlovu 89'	Report	Philip Zialor 90'	Stadium: National Sports Stadium

7 June 2003 2004 African Cup of Nations qualification	Seychelles	2–1	Zimbabwe	Victoria, Seychelles
	Alpha Baldé 73' (pen.); Philip Zialor 87'	Report	Charles Yohane 80'	Stadium: Stade Linité

21 June 2003 2004 African Cup of Nations qualification	Eritrea	1–0	Seychelles	Asmara, Eritrea
	Yonas Fesehaye 62'	Report		Stadium: Cicero Stadium

5 July 2003 2004 African Cup of Nations qualification	Seychelles	0–2	Mali	Victoria, Seychelles
		Report	Sammy Traoré 61'; Mamadou Bagayoko 90'	Stadium: Stade Linité

28 August 2003 2003 Indian Ocean Island Games	Madagascar	1–1	Seychelles	Curepipe, Mauritius
	Ruphin Menakely 32'	Report	Alpha Baldé 87'	Stadium: Stade George V

2 September 2003 2003 Indian Ocean Island Games	Mauritius	0–0	Seychelles	Curepipe, Mauritius
		Report		Stadium: Stade George V

4 September 2003 2003 Indian Ocean Island Games	Réunion	1–0	Seychelles	Centre de Flacq, Mauritius
	Willy Robert 2'	Report		Stadium: Stade Auguste Vollaire

6 September 2003 2003 Indian Ocean Island Games	Comoros	0–2	Seychelles	Curepipe, Mauritius
		Report	Yelvany Rose 2', 25'	Stadium: Stade George V

11 October 2003 2006 FIFA World Cup qualification	Seychelles	0–4	Zambia	Victoria, Seychelles
		Report	Gift Kampamba 8'; Dudley Fichite 44'; Harry Milanzi 52'; Numba Mumamba 57'	Stadium: Stade Linité

15 October 2003 2006 FIFA World Cup qualification	Zambia	1–1	Seychelles	Lusaka, Zambia
	Harry Milanzi 7'	Report	Robert Suzette 70'	Stadium: Independence Stadium

=== 2005 ===
26 February 2005 2005 COSAFA Cup	South Africa	3–0	Seychelles	Curepipe, Mauritius
	Katlego Mphela 12', 16'; Lerato Chabangu 44'	Report		Stadium: Stade George V

=== 2006 ===
28 June 2006 Friendly	Seychelles	2–1	Mauritius	Victoria, Seychelles
	???; ???	Report	Cyril Mourgine 90'	Stadium: People's Stadium

30 June 2006 Friendly	Seychelles	2–1	Tanzania	Victoria, Seychelles
	Yelvany Rose 23'; Philip Zialor 81'	Report	Salum Ussi 15'	Stadium: People's Stadium

22 July 2006 2006 COSAFA Cup	Namibia	1–1 (a.e.t.) (2–4 p)	Seychelles	Windhoek, Namibia
	Costa Khaiseb 18'	Report	Wilnes Brutus 11'	Stadium: Sam Nujoma Stadium

23 July 2006 2006 COSAFA Cup	Zambia	2–0	Seychelles	Windhoek, Namibia
	James Chamanga 33'; Ignatius Lwipa 44'	Report		Stadium: Independence Stadium

3 September 2006 2008 Africa Cup of Nations qualification	Sudan	3–0	Seychelles	Khartoum, Sudan
	Badreldin Galag 20'; Haitham Tambal 77' (pen.), 90'	Report		Stadium: Khartoum Stadium

7 October 2006 2008 Africa Cup of Nations qualification	Seychelles	2–1	Mauritius	Victoria, Seychelles
	Wilnes Brutus 22', 81'	Report	Kervin Godon 50'	Stadium: Stade Linité

=== 2007 ===
24 March 2007 2008 Africa Cup of Nations qualification	Seychelles	0–3	Tunisia	Victoria, Seychelles
		Report	Issam Jemâa 13', 76', 81'	Stadium: Stade Linité

24 April 2007 Friendly	Seychelles	2–0	Réunion	Victoria, Seychelles
	Henny Dufresne 25'; Philip Zialor 39'	Report		Stadium: Stade Linité

28 April 2007 2007 COSAFA Cup	Mozambique	2–0	Seychelles	Matola, Mozambique
	Binó Alaze 51', 77'	Report		Stadium: Estádio da Machava

29 April 2007 2007 COSAFA Cup	Madagascar	5–0	Seychelles	Matola, Mozambique
	Paulin Voavy 11', 14', 69'; Claudio Ramiadamanana 61'; Faneva Ima Andriatsima 84'	Report		Stadium: Estádio da Machava

2 June 2007 2008 Africa Cup of Nations qualification	Tunisia	4–0	Seychelles	Tunis, Tunisia
	Issam Jemâa 26'; Kamel Zaïem 42', 67'; Amine Chermiti 83'	Report		Stadium: Stade Olympique Hammadi Agrebi

16 June 2007 2008 Africa Cup of Nations qualification	Seychelles	0–2	Sudan	Victoria, Seychelles
		Report	Faisal Ajeb 44'; Haitham Tambal 71'	Stadium: Stade Linité

10 August 2007 2007 Indian Ocean Island Games	Mayotte	1–2	Seychelles	Antananarivo, Madagascar
	Djardji Nadhoime 40' (pen.)	Report	Philip Zialor 18'; Godfrey Denis Armel 27' (pen.)	Stadium: Mahamasina Municipal Stadium

14 August 2007 2007 Indian Ocean Island Games	Mauritius	3–0	Seychelles	Antananarivo, Madagascar
	Giovanni Jeannot 24', 64'; Kersley Appou 40'	Report		Stadium: Mahamasina Municipal Stadium

9 September 2007 2008 Africa Cup of Nations qualification	Mauritius	1–1	Seychelles	Curepipe, Mauritius
	Christopher Perle 62'	Report	Godfrey Denis Armel 42' (pen.)	Stadium: Stade George V

=== 2008 ===
1 June 2008 2010 FIFA World Cup qualification	Burundi	0–0	Seychelles	Bujumbura, Burundi
		Report		Stadium: Intwari Stadium

7 June 2008 2010 FIFA World Cup qualification	Seychelles	0–2	Tunisia	Victoria, Seychelles
		Report	Issam Jemâa 9'; Chaouki Ben Saada 43'	Stadium: Stade Linité

14 June 2008 2010 FIFA World Cup qualification	Seychelles	2–3	Burkina Faso	Victoria, Seychelles
	Philip Zialor 47'; Don Annacoura 53'	Report	Moumouni Dagano 25', 57', 78'	Stadium: Stade Linité

21 June 2008 2010 FIFA World Cup qualification	Burkina Faso	4–1	Seychelles	Ouagadougou, Burkino Faso
	Charles Kaboré 21'; Mahamoudou Kéré 28'; Issouf Ouattara 54'; Yssouf Koné 89'	Report	Bernard St. Ange 44'	Stadium: Stade du 4 Août

19 July 2008 2008 COSAFA Cup	Mauritius	0–7	Seychelles	Witbank, South Africa
		Report	Colin Laporte 14'; Philip Zialor 35', 51', 59', 88'; Don Annacoura 66'; Trevor Poiret 87'	Stadium: Witbank Stadium

21 July 2008 2008 COSAFA Cup	Madagascar	1–1	Seychelles	Witbank, South Africa
	Tovohery Rabenandrasana 23'	Report	Godfrey Denis Armel 48'	Stadium: Witbank Stadium

23 July 2008 2008 COSAFA Cup	Eswatini	1–0	Seychelles	Witbank, South Africa
	Mfanzile Dlamini 90'	Report		Stadium: Witbank Stadium

6 September 2008 2010 FIFA World Cup qualification	Seychelles	1–2	Burundi	Victoria, Seychelles
	Philip Zialor 63'	Report	Henry Mbazumutima 28'; Papa Claude Nahimana 58'	Stadium: Stade Linité

11 October 2008 2010 FIFA World Cup qualification	Tunisia	5–0	Seychelles	Tunis, Tunisia
	Hichem Essifi 5', 68'; Yassin Mikari 18'; Saber Ben Frej 20'; Fahid Ben Khalfallah 43'	Report		Stadium: Stade Olympique Hammadi Agrebi

=== 2009 ===
18 October 2009 2009 COSAFA Cup	Eswatini	2–1	Seychelles	Bulawayo, Mozambique
	Mathokoza Thwala 72'; Mfanzile Dlamini 74'	Report	Philip Zialor 6'	Stadium: Barbourfields Stadium

20 October 2009 2009 COSAFA Cup	Comoros	2–1	Seychelles	Bulawayo, Mozambique
	Ahmed Ali Soilihi 7'; Mohamed Mouigni 64'	Report	Don Annacoura 53'	Stadium: Barbourfields Stadium

22 October 2009 2009 COSAFA Cup	Botswana	2–0	Seychelles	Bulawayo, Mozambique
	Pontsho Moloi 6'; Malepa Bolelang 36'	Report		Stadium: Barbourfields Stadium

=== 2011 ===
4 August 2011 2011 Indian Ocean Island Games	Seychelles	0–0	Comoros	Praslin, Seychelles
		Report		Stadium: Stade d'Amitié

6 August 2011 2011 Indian Ocean Island Games	Seychelles	2–1	Mauritius	Victoria, Seychelles
	Nelson Laurence 1'; Achille Henriette 29'	Report	Fabrice Pithia 77'	Stadium: Stade Linité

9 August 2011 2011 Indian Ocean Island Games	Seychelles	5–1	Maldives	Victoria, Seychelles
	Nelson Laurence 16'; Don Annacoura 23'; Achille Henriette 62'; Alpha Baldé 75', 80'	Report	Ibrahim Fazeel 26'	Stadium: Stade Linité

11 August 2011 2011 Indian Ocean Island Games	Seychelles	2–1	Réunion	Victoria, Seychelles
	Alex Nibourette 78'; Karl Hall 118'	Report	Éric Farrol 64'	Stadium: Stade Linité

13 August 2011 2011 Indian Ocean Island Games	Seychelles	1–1 (a.e.t.) (4–3 p)	Mauritius	Victoria, Seychelles
	Kevin Betsy 16'	Report	Jerry Louis 62'	Stadium: Stade Linité

11 November 2011 2014 FIFA World Cup qualification	Seychelles	0–3	Kenya	Victoria, Seychelles
		Report	Pascal Ochieng 41'; Dennis Oliech 75', 81'	Stadium: Stade Linité

14 November 2011 2014 FIFA World Cup qualification	Kenya	4–0	Seychelles	Nairobi, Kenya
	Brian Onyango 19'; Dennis Oliech 36'; Titus Mulama 46'; Victor Wanyama 74'	Report		Stadium: Nyayo National Stadium

22 November 2011 Friendly	Maldives	3–0	Seychelles	Malé, Maldives
		Report	Ahmed Thoriq 13', 47'; Ali Ashfaq 78'	Stadium: Galolhu Rasmee Dhandu Stadium

24 November 2011 Friendly	Maldives	2–1	Seychelles	Malé, Maldives
	Ibrahim Fazeel 85', 90' (pen.)	Report	???	Stadium: Galolhu Rasmee Dhandu Stadium

=== 2012 ===
29 February 2012 2013 Africa Cup of Nations qualification	Seychelles	0–4	DR Congo	Victoria, Seychelles
		Report	Dioko Kaluyituka 11', 48'; Trésor Mputu 28'; Jérémie Basilua 90'	Stadium: Stade Linité

17 June 2012 2013 Africa Cup of Nations qualification	DR Congo	3–0	Seychelles	Kinshasa, DR Congo
	Dieumerci Mbokani 38'; Mpeko Issama 45'; Déo Kanda 84'	Report		Stadium: Stade des Martyrs

2 December 2012 2014 African Nations Championship qualification	Mozambique	4–0	Seychelles	Maputo, Mozambique
	???; ???; ???; ???	Report		Stadium: Estádio do Zimpeto

16 December 2012 2014 African Nations Championship qualification	Seychelles	1–2	Mozambique	Victoria, Seychelles
	???	Report	???; ???	Stadium: Stade Linité

=== 2013 ===
8 July 2013 2013 COSAFA Cup	Namibia	4–2	Seychelles	Lusaka, Zambia
	Sadney Urikhob 24'; Ananias Gebhardt 39', 46'; Neville Tjiueza 87'	Report	Yves Zialor 13', 37'	Stadium: Nkoloma Stadium

10 July 2013 2013 COSAFA Cup	Mauritius	4–0	Seychelles	Lusaka, Zambia
	Gurty Calambé 13'; Stéphane Pierre 22', 73'; Fabrice Pithia 37'	Report		Stadium: Nkana Stadium

27 November 2013 Friendly	Seychelles	3–1	Maldives	Victoria, Seychelles
	Gerard Basset 4', 65'; Achille Henriette 52'	Report	Ali Ashfaq 17'	Stadium: Stade Linité

29 November 2013 Friendly	Seychelles	2–1	Maldives	Victoria, Seychelles
	Colin Esther 43'; Achille Henriette 64'	Report	Ali Ashfaq 55'	Stadium: Stade Linité

=== 2014 ===
11 July 2014 Friendly	Uganda	1–0	Seychelles	Kampala, Uganda
	Faruku Miya 24'	Report		Stadium: Lugogo Stadium

19 July 2014 2015 Africa Cup of Nations qualification	Sierra Leone	2–0	Seychelles	Freetown, Sierra Leone
	Khalifa Jabbie 55'; Umaru Bangura 72' (pen.)	Report		Stadium: National Stadium

26 August 2014 Friendly	Seychelles	1–2	Sri Lanka	Victoria, Seychelles
	Gervais Waye-Hive 30'	Report	Zarwan Johar 56'; Mohamed Rifnas 76'	Stadium: Stade Linité

28 August 2014 Friendly	Seychelles	3–0	Sri Lanka	Victoria, Seychelles
	Gervais Waye-Hive 29', 78'; Achille Henriette 64'	Report		Stadium: Stade Linité

=== 2015 ===
29 March 2015 Friendly	Seychelles	0–2	Kenya	Victoria, Seychelles
		Report	Collins Shivachi 4'; Vincent Odongo 43'	Stadium: Stade Linité

17 May 2015 2015 COSAFA Cup	Namibia	0–0	Seychelles	Moruleng, South Africa
		Report		Stadium: Moruleng Stadium

19 May 2015 2015 COSAFA Cup	Zimbabwe	1–0	Seychelles	Moruleng, South Africa
	Talent Chawapiwa 52'	Report		Stadium: Moruleng Stadium

21 May 2015 2015 COSAFA Cup	Mauritius	1–0	Seychelles	Phokeng, South Africa
	Andy Sophie 84'	Report		Stadium: Royal Bafokeng Stadium

13 June 2015 2017 Africa Cup of Nations qualification	Algeria	4–0	Seychelles	Blida, Algeria
	Islam Slimani 21'; Hillal Soudani 34', 47'; Nabil Bentaleb 89'	Report		Stadium: Mustapha Tchaker Stadium

20 June 2015 2016 African Nations Championship qualification	Mozambique	5–1	Seychelles	Beira, Mozambique
	Luís Miquissone 32', 42', 49'; Reinildo Mandava 35'; Diogo António Alberto 73'	Report	Gervais Waye-Hive 70'	Stadium: Estádio do Ferroviário

4 July 2015 2016 African Nations Championship qualification	Seychelles	0–4	Mozambique	Victoria, Seychelles
		Report	Luís Miquissone 14'; Isac Carvalho 20'; Gildo Vilanculos 37'; Reinildo Mandava 44'	Stadium: Stade Linité

31 July 2015 2015 Indian Ocean Island Games	Madagascar	0–3 (w/o)	Seychelles	Saint-Denis, Réunion
		Report		Stadium: Stade Jean-Ivoula

2 August 2015 2015 Indian Ocean Island Games	Maldives	2–1	Seychelles	Saint-Denis, Réunion
	Mohamed Umair 28' (pen.); Ahmed Imaz 43'	Report	Bertrand Esther 5'	Stadium: Stade Baby-Larivière

4 August 2015 2015 Indian Ocean Island Games	Mayotte	1–0	Seychelles	Saint-Pierre, Réunion
	Antoine Rasolofo 66'	Report		Stadium: Stade Michel Volnay

5 September 2015 2017 Africa Cup of Nations qualification	Seychelles	1–1	Ethiopia	Victoria, Seychelles
	Nelson Laurence 24' (pen.)	Report	Siyoum Tesfaye 54'	Stadium: Stade Linité

7 October 2015 2018 FIFA World Cup qualification	Seychelles	0–1	Burundi	Victoria, Seychelles
		Report	Abdul Razak Fiston 15'	Stadium: Stade Linité

13 October 2015 2018 FIFA World Cup qualification	Burundi	2–0	Seychelles	Bujumbura, Burundi
	Abdul Razak Fiston 71', 81' (pen.)	Report		Stadium: Intwari Stadium

=== 2016 ===
26 March 2016 2017 Africa Cup of Nations qualification	Seychelles	2–0	Lesotho	Victoria, Seychelles
	Gervais Waye-Hive 2'; Dine Suzette 78'	Report		Stadium: Stade Linité

29 March 2016 2017 Africa Cup of Nations qualification	Lesotho	2–1	Seychelles	Maseru, Lesotho
	Sunny Jane 20'; Tumelo Khutlang 76'	Report	Dine Suzette 25'	Stadium: Setsoto Stadium

2 June 2016 2017 Africa Cup of Nations qualification	Seychelles	0–2	Algeria	Victoria, Seychelles
		Report	Yassine Benzia 41'; Hillel Soudani 62'	Stadium: Stade Linité

11 June 2016 2016 COSAFA Cup	Madagascar	1–0	Seychelles	Windhoek, Namibia
	Tojo Claudel Fanomezana 21'	Report		Stadium: Sam Nujoma Stadium

13 June 2016 2016 COSAFA Cup	Eswatini	4–0	Seychelles	Windhoek, Namibia
	Felix Badenhorst 14', 34'; Njabulo Ndlovu 68'; Wonder Nhleko 90'	Report		Stadium: Sam Nujoma Stadium

15 June 2016 2016 COSAFA Cup	Zimbabwe	5–0	Seychelles	Windhoek, Namibia
	Ronald Pfumbidzai 23' (pen.); Marshal Mudehwe 37'; Lawrence Mhlanga 64', 90+3'; Teenage Hadebe 73'	Report		Stadium: Sam Nujoma Stadium

3 September 2016 2017 Africa Cup of Nations qualification	Ethiopia	2–1	Seychelles	Awassa, Ethiopia
	Getaneh Kebede 34'; Saladin Said 53'	Report	Achille Henriette 21'	Stadium: Awassa Kenema Stadium

=== 2017 ===
22 April 2017 2018 African Nations Championship qualification	Mauritius	2–1	Seychelles	Belle Vue Harel, Mauritius
	Emmanuel Vincent 6'; Francis Rasolofonirina 51'	Report	Yannick Manou 78'	Stadium: Anjalay Stadium

29 April 2017 2018 African Nations Championship qualification	Seychelles	1–1	Mauritius	Victoria, Seychelles
	Leroy Coralie 50' (pen.)	Report	Marco Dorza 15'	Stadium: Stade Linité

9 June 2017 2019 Africa Cup of Nations qualification	Libya	5–1	Seychelles	Cairo, Egypt
	Mohamed Anis Saltou 22'; Ahmad Benali 26' (pen.); Hamdou Elhouni 45+1'; Mohamed Zubya 65'; Muaid Ellafi 82'	Report	Leroy Coralie 90'	Stadium: Petro Sport Stadium

26 June 2017 2017 COSAFA Cup	Madagascar	2–0	Seychelles	Moruleng, South Africa
	Ardino Raveloarisona 45+1'; Rinjala Raherinaivo 75'	Report		Stadium: Moruleng Stadium

28 June 2017 2017 COSAFA Cup	Mozambique	2–1	Seychelles	Phokeng, South Africa
	Stélio Teca 48'; Joao Simango 70'	Report	Roddy Melanie 63'	Stadium: Royal Bafokeng Stadium

30 June 2017 2017 COSAFA Cup	Zimbabwe	6–0	Seychelles	Phokeng, South Africa
	Ovidy Karuru 24', 26', 67'; Prince Dube 57'; Ocean Mushure 85', 90+3'	Report		Stadium: Royal Bafokeng Stadium

=== 2018 ===
27 March 2018 Friendly	Seychelles	0–0	Eswatini	Victoria, Seychelles
		Report		Stadium: Stade Linité

27 May 2018 2018 COSAFA Cup	Comoros	1–1	Seychelles	Polokwane, South Africa
	Mohamed M'Changama 60'	Report	Leroy Coralie 83'	Stadium: Peter Mokaba Stadium

29 May 2018 2018 COSAFA Cup	Madagascar	1–1	Seychelles	Polokwane, South Africa
	Bourahim Jaotombo 24'	Report	Warren Mellie 35'	Stadium: Seshego Stadium

31 May 2018 2018 COSAFA Cup	Mozambique	2–1	Seychelles	Polokwane, South Africa
	Luís Miquissone 11' (pen.); Jeitoso 74'	Report	Elijah Tamboo 52'	Stadium: Peter Mokaba Stadium

8 September 2018 2019 Africa Cup of Nations qualification	Seychelles	0–3	Nigeria	Victoria, Seychelles
		Report	Ahmed Musa 14'; Chidozie Awaziem 33'; Odion Ighalo 57' (pen.)	Stadium: Stade Linité

13 October 2018 2019 Africa Cup of Nations qualification	South Africa	6–0	Seychelles	Johannesburg, South Africa
	Nigel Hoareau 22' (o.g.); Thulani Hlatshwayo 24'; Lebo Mothiba 26'; Percy Tau 73'; Dino Ndlovu 80'; Teboho Mokoena 90+2'	Report		Stadium: FNB Stadium

16 September 2018 2019 Africa Cup of Nations qualification	Seychelles	0–0	South Africa	Victoria, Seychelles
		Report		Stadium: Stade Linité

17 November 2018 2019 Africa Cup of Nations qualification	Seychelles	1–8	Libya	Victoria, Seychelles
	Perry Monnaie 71'	Report	Motasem Sabbou 2'; Mohamed Anis Saltou 20', 31', 62'; Khaled Majdi 55'; Salem Elmslaty 58'; Rabi Al-Shadi 85'; Hamdou Elhouni 90+2'	Stadium: Stade Linité

=== 2019 ===
22 March 2019 2019 Africa Cup of Nations qualification	Nigeria	3–1	Seychelles	Asaba, Nigeria
	Odion Ighalo 35' (pen.); Henry Onyekuru 50'; Moses Simon 90+1'	Report	Rody Melanie 41'	Stadium: Stephen Keshi Stadium

20 April 2019 2020 African Nations Championship qualification	Botswana	2–0	Seychelles	Lobatse, Botswana
	Thatayaone Ditlhokwe 58'; Segolame Boy 62'	Report		Stadium: Lobatse Stadium

11 May 2019 2020 African Nations Championship qualification	Seychelles	1–3	Botswana	Victoria, Seychelles
	Perry Monnaie 62'	Report	Thero Setsile 55', 87'; Joel Mogorosi 71'	Stadium: Stade Linité

26 May 2019 2019 COSAFA Cup	Malawi	3–0	Seychelles	Umlazi, South Africa
	Gabadinho Mhango 9'; Richard Mbulu 49'; Gerald Phiri Jr. 85'	Report		Stadium: King Zwelithini Stadium

28 May 2019 2019 COSAFA Cup	Mozambique	0–0	Seychelles	Umlazi, South Africa
		Report		Stadium: King Zwelithini Stadium

30 May 2019 2019 COSAFA Cup	Namibia	3–0	Seychelles	KwaMashu, South Africa
	Isaskar Gurirab 19', 26'; Sadney Urikhob 66'	Report		Stadium: Princess Magogo Stadium

18 July 2019 2019 Indian Ocean Island Games	Mauritius	1–1	Seychelles	Curepipe, Mauritius
	Ashley Nazira 3'	Report	Colin Bibi 68'	Stadium: Stade George V

20 July 2019 2019 Indian Ocean Island Games	Madagascar	0–0	Seychelles	Centre de Flacq, Mauritius
		Report		Stadium: Stade Auguste Vollaire

24 July 2019 2019 Indian Ocean Island Games	Réunion	4–0	Seychelles	Centre de Flacq, Mauritius
	Joé Damour 17'; Loïc Rivière 42'; Sylvain Philéas 46'; Alexandre Loricourt 63'	Report		Stadium: Stade Auguste Vollaire

26 July 2019 2019 Indian Ocean Island Games	Mayotte	3–1	Seychelles	Centre de Flacq, Mauritius
	Antoine Rasolofo 22'; Moudoihir Ben Yahaya 74', 83'	Report	Darrel Damoo 34'	Stadium: Stade Auguste Vollaire

5 September 2019 2022 FIFA World Cup qualification	Seychelles	0–3	Rwanda	Victoria, Seychelles
		Report	Muhadjiri Hakizimana 32'; Yannick Mukunzi 36'; Meddie Kagere 80'	Stadium: Stade Linité

10 September 2019 2022 FIFA World Cup qualification	Rwanda	7–0	Seychelles	Kigali, Rwanda
	Djihad Bizimana 16'; Meddie Kagere 27', 51'; Jacques Tuyisenge 29', 34'; Yannick Mukunzi 57'; Muhadjiri Hakizimana 79'	Report		Stadium: Stade Régional Nyamirambo

9 October 2019 2021 Africa Cup of Nations qualification	South Sudan	2–1	Seychelles	Omdurman, Sudan
	Koang Thok 20'; Joseph Kuch 44'	Report	Nigel Hoareau 12'	Stadium: Al-Merrikh Stadium

13 October 2019 2021 Africa Cup of Nations qualification	Seychelles	0–1	South Sudan	Victoria, Seychelles
		Report	Joseph Kuch 72'	Stadium: Stade Linité

=== 2020 ===
18 January 2020 2020 Bangabandhu Cup	Burundi	3–1	Seychelles	Dhaka, Bangladesh
	Jospin Nshimirimana 54'; Amissi Tambwe 60', 61'	Report	Perry Monnaie 26'	Stadium: Bangabandhu National Stadium

20 January 2020 2020 Bangabandhu Cup	Mauritius	2–2	Seychelles	Dhaka, Bangladesh
	Jason Ferré 67'; Adrien François 90+1'	Report	Gervais Waye-Hive 19'; Perry Monnaie 28'	Stadium: Bangabandhu National Stadium

22 January 2020 2020 Bangabandhu Cup	Palestine	1–0	Seychelles	Dhaka, Bangladesh
	Layth Kharoub 79'	Report		Stadium: Bangabandhu National Stadium

=== 2021 ===
1 September 2021 Friendly	Comoros	7–1	Seychelles	Moroni, Comoros
	Faïz Selemani 31'; Mohamed Youssouf 34'; Ahmed Mogni 38', 47'; El Fardou Ben Nabouhane 62', 74', 82'	Report	Ryan Henriette 77'	Stadium: Stade Omnisports de Malouzini

4 September 2021 Friendly	Burundi	8–1	Seychelles	Moroni, Comoros
	Issa Hakizimana 5'; Blaise Bigirimana 8', 48'; Bienvenue Shaka 15'; Steve Nzigamasabo 34'; Jules Ulimwengu 75'; Landry Ndikumana 83'; Dean Mothé 89' (o.g.)	Report	Lorenzo Hoareau 81' (pen.)	Stadium: Stade Omnisports de Malouzini

10 November 2021 2021 Four Nations Football Tournament	Bangladesh	1–1	Seychelles	Colombo, Sri Lanka
	Mohammad Ibrahim 17'	Report	Brandon Labrosse 88'	Stadium: Racecourse Ground

13 November 2021 2021 Four Nations Football Tournament	Sri Lanka	0–1	Seychelles	Colombo, Sri Lanka
		Report	Warren Mellie 68'	Stadium: Racecourse Ground

16 November 2021 2021 Four Nations Football Tournament	Maldives	0–0	Seychelles	Colombo, Sri Lanka
		Report		Stadium: Racecourse Ground

19 November 2021 2021 Four Nations Football Tournament	Sri Lanka	3–3 (a.e.t.) (1–3 p)	Seychelles	Colombo, Sri Lanka
	Marvin Hamilton 4'; Mohamed Aakib 57'; Ahmed Waseem Razeek 75' (pen.)	Report	Hubert Jean 45+1'; Charitha Rathnayake 85' (o.g.); Elijah Tamboo 90'	Stadium: Racecourse Ground
	Penalties
	Marvin Hamilton (penalty missed); Asikur Rahuman (penalty missed); Sujan Perera (penalty scored); Charitha Rathnayake (penalty missed)		(penalty missed) Don Fanchette; (penalty scored) Elijah Tamboo; (penalty scored) Hubert Jean; (penalty scored) Jean-Yves Ernesta

=== 2022 ===
19 March 2022 Friendly	Mauritius	0–0	Seychelles	Saint Pierre, Mauritius
		Report		Stadium: Complexe Sportif de Côte d'Or

23 March 2022 2023 Africa Cup of Nations qualification	Lesotho	0–0	Seychelles	Saint Pierre, Mauritius
		Report		Stadium: Complexe Sportif de Côte d'Or

27 March 2022 2023 Africa Cup of Nations qualification	Lesotho	3–1	Seychelles	Soweto, South Africa
	Katleho Makateng 5', 78'; Sera Motebang 9'	Report	Jean-Yves Perry Ernesta 25' (pen.)	Stadium: Dobsonville Stadium

5 July 2022 2022 COSAFA Cup	Botswana	1–0	Seychelles	Durban, South Africa
	Thato Kebue 49'	Report		Stadium: King Zwelithini Stadium

7 July 2022 2022 COSAFA Cup	Angola	3–0	Seychelles	Durban, South Africa
	Julinho 14'; Pedro Megue 78' (pen.); Vanilson 90'	Report		Stadium: King Zwelithini Stadium

10 July 2022 2022 COSAFA Cup	Comoros	2–1	Seychelles	KwaMashu, South Africa
	Abdullah Said Sadad 9'; Ali Moudhoiffar 80'	Report	Ryan Henriette 34'	Stadium: Princess Magogo Stadium

18 July 2022 Friendly	Mauritius	2–0	Seychelles	Quatre Bornes, Mauritius
	Jean Hansley Patate 50' (pen.); Frédéric Sarah 87'	Report		Stadium: MFA Football Ground Trianon

23 July 2022 2022 African Nations Championship qualification	Madagascar	1–0	Seychelles	Saint Pierre, Mauritius
	Arohasina Andrianarimanana 24'	Report		Stadium: Complexe Sportif de Côte d'Or

31 July 2022 2022 African Nations Championship qualification	Madagascar	3–0	Seychelles	Antananarivo, Madagascar
	Tsilavina Razanakoto 5', 90+3'; Rinjala Raherinaivo 68'	Report		Stadium: Mahamasina Municipal Stadium

21 September 2022 Friendly	San Marino	0–0	Seychelles	Serravalle, San Marino
		Report		Stadium: Stadio Olimpico de Serravalle

=== 2023 ===
25 March 2023 Friendly	Bangladesh	1–0	Seychelles	Sylhet, Bangladesh
	Tariq Kazi 42'	Report		Stadium: Sylhet District Stadium

28 March 2023 Friendly	Bangladesh	0–1	Seychelles	Sylhet, Bangladesh
		Report	Michael Mancienne 61' (pen.)	Stadium: Sylhet District Stadium

6 July 2023 2023 COSAFA Cup	Comoros	3–0	Seychelles	Durban, South Africa
15:00	Affane Djambae 27'; Ibroihim Djoudja 39'; Raidou Bacar 59'	Report		Stadium: King Zwelithini Stadium

9 July 2023 2023 COSAFA Cup	Malawi	2–0	Seychelles	Durban, South Africa
18:00	Lanjesi Nkhoma 55'; Christopher Jacama Kumwembe 65'	Report		Stadium: King Zwelithini Stadium

11 July 2023 2023 COSAFA Cup	Zambia	4–2	Seychelles	KwaMashu, South Africa
15:00	Albert Kangwanda 11'; Killian Kanguluma 54'; Golden Mashata 58'; Fredrick Mulambia 73'	Report	Brandon Labrosse 81'; Warren Mellie 90' (pen.)	Stadium: Princess Magogo Stadium

24 August 2023 2023 Indian Ocean Island Games	Madagascar	1–0	Seychelles	Antananarivo, Madagascar
	Tendry Randrianarijaona 19'	Report		Stadium: Elgeco Plus Stadium

28 August 2023 2023 Indian Ocean Island Games	Mauritius	1–0	Seychelles	Antananarivo, Madagascar
	Aurélien François 17'	Report		Stadium: Mahamasina Municipal Stadium

17 November 2023 2026 FIFA World Cup qualification	Ivory Coast	9–0	Seychelles	Abidjan, Ivory Coast
	Sébastien Haller 20' (pen.); Ibrahim Sangaré 24'; Simon Adingra 36'; Karim Konaté 40' (pen.), 90+5'; Seko Fofana 60'; Hamed Traorè 77', 90+4'; Jean-Philippe Krasso 84' (pen.)	Report		Stadium: Alassane Ouattara Stadium

20 November 2023 2026 FIFA World Cup qualification	Kenya	5–0	Seychelles	Abidjan, Ivory Coast
	Michael Olunga 3', 6'; Masoud Juma 45+3'; Rooney Onyango 62'; Benson Omala 73'	Report		Stadium: Stade Felix Houphouet-Boigny

=== 2024 ===
8 June 2026 FIFA World Cup qualification	Gambia	5–1	Seychelles	Berkane, Morocco
17:00 UTC+1	Muhammed Badamosi 10', 66'; Musa Barrow 52' (pen.); Yankuba Minteh 55'; Adama Sidibeh 78'	Report	Ryan Henriette 14'	Stadium: Berkane Municipal Stadium; Attendance: 700; Referee: Joseph Odey Ogabor (Nigeria)

11 June 2026 FIFA World Cup qualification	Seychelles	1–3	Burundi	Berkane, Morocco
20:00 UTC+1	Lorenzo Hoareau 78'	Report	Sudi Abdallah 34'; Bienvenue Kanakimana 62', 69'	Stadium: Berkane Municipal Stadium

28 June 2024 COSAFA Cup	Lesotho	1–1	Seychelles	Gqeberha, South Africa
15:00	Jane Thabantso 19'	Report	Lorenzo Hoareau 69'	Stadium: Nelson Mandela Bay Stadium

1 July 2024 COSAFA Cup	Angola	3–2	Seychelles	Gqeberha, South Africa
12:00	Depú 9', 58'; Maestro 79'	Report	Johan Gamatice 26'; Brandon Labrosse 46'	Stadium: Isaac Wolfson Stadium

3 July 2024 COSAFA Cup	Namibia	3–1	Seychelles	Gqeberha, South Africa
15:00	Bethuel Muzeu 11' (pen.), 81'; Erastus Kulula 48'	Report	Brandon Labrosse 87'	Stadium: Nelson Mandela Bay Stadium

=== 2025 ===
20 March 2026 FIFA World Cup qualification	Gabon	3–0	Seychelles	Franceville, Gabon
20:00	Allevinah 3'; Bouanga 30', 63'			Stadium: Stade de Franceville; Referee: Mehrez Melki (Tunisia)

25 March 2026 FIFA World Cup qualification	Burundi	5–0	Seychelles	Meknes, Morocco
				Stadium: Honneur Stadium

3 September 2025 2026 FIFA World Cup qualification	Gabon	4–0	Seychelles	Saint Pierre, Mauritius
17:00 UTC+4	Denis Bouanga 4', 34', 38'; Yannis M'Bemba 89'	Report (FIFA); Report (CAF)		Stadium: Côte d'Or National Sports Complex; Referee: Jean Ouattara (Burkina Faso)

9 September 2026 FIFA World Cup qualification	Kenya	5–0	Seychelles	Nairobi, Kenya
	Ryan Ogam 7', 38'; Collins Sichenje 35'; Michael Olunga 45+5' (pen.), 67'	Report (FIFA); Report (CAF)		Stadium: Moi International Sports Centre

6 October 2026 FIFA World Cup qualification	Ivory Coast	7–0	Seychelles	Saint Pierre, Mauritius
17:00 UTC+4	Ibrahim Sangaré 7' (pen.); Emmanuel Agbadouu 17'; Oumar Diakité 32'; Evann Guessand 39'; Yan Diomande 55'; Simon Adingra 67'; Franck Kessié 90'	Report		Stadium: Côte d'Or National Sports Complex; Referee: Jean Ishimwe (Rwanda)

14 October 2026 FIFA World Cup qualification	Gambia	7–0	Seychelles	Saint Pierre, Mauritius
	Adama Sidibeh 2', 46'; Abdoulie Manneh 24', 67', 75'; Musa Barrow 47', 52'	Report		Stadium: Côte d'Or National Sports Complex

=== 2026 ===
26 March 2027 Africa Cup of Nations qualification	Lesotho	0–0	Seychelles	Bloemfontein, South Africa
		Report		Stadium: Free State Stadium

29 March 2027 Africa Cup of Nations qualification	Lesotho	2–1	Seychelles	Maseru, Lesotho
	Lebohang Lesako 50'; Sera Motebang 82'	Report	Brandon Labrosse 45+2'	Stadium: Setsoto Stadium

27 September Friendly	Seychelles	0–3	Sri Lanka	Victoria, Seychelles
		Report	Adhavan Rajamohan 45+2' (pen.), 52'; Dillon De Silva 76'	Stadium: Stade Linité; Referee: Hery Tiana Andriananivoarison (Madagascar)

30 September Friendly	Seychelles	0–2	Sri Lanka	Victoria, Seychelles
		Report	Dillon De Silva 32'; Ahmed Waseem Razeek 84'	Stadium: Stade Linité; Referee: Hery Tiana Andriananivoarison (Madagascar)

== All-time record ==
Key

- Pld = Matches played
- W = Matches won
- D = Matches drawn
- L = Matches lost
- GF = Goals for
- GA = Goals against
- GD = Goal differential
- Countries are listed in alphabetical order

As of 30 September 2026

Positive Record Neutral Record Negative Record

Opponent	Pld	W	D	L	GF	GA	GD
Algeria	2	0	0	2	0	6	−6
Angola	2	0	0	2	2	6	−4
Bangladesh	3	1	1	1	2	2	0
Botswana	4	0	0	4	1	8	−7
Burkina Faso	2	0	0	2	3	7	−4
Burundi	8	0	1	7	4	24	−20
Comoros	9	3	2	4	11	16	−5
Congo	1	0	1	0	1	1	0
DR Congo	2	0	0	2	0	7	−7
Eritrea	3	1	0	2	1	2	−1
Eswatini	4	0	1	3	1	7	−6
Ethiopia	2	0	1	1	2	3	−1
Gabon	2	0	0	2	0	7	−7
Gambia	2	0	0	2	1	12	−11
Ivory Coast	2	0	0	2	0	16	−16
Kenya	9	0	1	8	4	26	−22
Lesotho	7	1	3	3	6	8	-2
Libya	2	0	0	2	2	13	-11
Madagascar	15	1	4	10	9	31	-22
Malawi	2	0	0	2	0	5	-5
Maldives	7	3	1	3	12	10	2
Mali	2	0	0	2	0	5	−5
Mauritius	29	7	7	15	31	44	−13
Mayotte	3	1	0	2	3	5	−2
Mozambique	8	0	1	7	4	21	−17
Namibia	7	1	2	4	5	15	−10
Nigeria	2	0	0	2	1	6	−5
Palestine	1	0	0	1	0	1	−1
Rwanda	2	0	0	2	0	10	−10
Réunion	9	3	0	6	7	16	−9
San Marino	1	0	1	0	0	0	0
Sierra Leone	1	0	0	1	0	2	−2
South Africa	3	0	1	2	0	10	−10
South Sudan	2	0	0	2	1	3	−2
Sri Lanka	6	2	1	3	8	10	-2
Sudan	2	0	0	2	0	5	-5
Tanzania	3	1	1	1	3	5	-2
Tunisia	4	0	0	4	0	14	−14
Uganda	3	0	0	3	2	8	−6
Zambia	4	0	1	3	3	11	−8
Zimbabwe	7	1	0	6	3	22	−19
Total	188	26	31	131	133	429	-297

== See also ==
- Seychelles women's national football team results
