= Ralph Jean-Louis =

Seychellois football manager (born 1968)

Personal information
- Date of birth: 11 September 1968 (age 58)
- Place of birth: Au Cap, Seychelles
- Positions: Midfielder; striker

Senior career*
Years	Team	Apps	(Gls)
?–?	Bel Air	?	(?)
?–?	Anse-aux-Pins	?	(?)
?–2004	St Michel United	?	(?)

International career
1990–2000	Seychelles	1+	(?)

Managerial career
- 2009–2011: St Michel United
- 2010–2011: Seychelles
- 2013–2015: St Michel United
- 2015–2016: Seychelles
- 2020–2021: Seychelles
- 2023–2026: Seychelles (caretaker)
Medal record
Men's football
Representing Seychelles (as player)
Indian Ocean Island Games
Bronze medal – third place	1990 Madagascar
Bronze medal – third place	1998 Reunion
Representing Seychelles (as manager)
Indian Ocean Island Games
Gold medal – first place	2011 Seychelles
- * Club domestic league appearances and goals

Ralph Jean-Louis (born 11 September 1968) is a Seychellois football manager and former player. He manages the Seychelles men's national team. He also used to manage St Michel United, a team in the Seychelles First Division. As a player, he played eleven years for the Seychelles national team as a midfielder and striker. At club level, he played for Bel Air FC, Anse-aux-Pins FC and St Michel United. He won two bronze medals as a player at the Indian Ocean Island Games as well as a gold as a manager.

== Playing career ==
=== Club career ===
Jean-Louis played for three clubs in his playing career. They were Bel Air FC, Anse-aux-Pins FC and St Michel United. He started his career and Bel Air, in an era when Seychellois football teams were based in a particular region. Bel Air FC represented the administrative district of Bel Air on the island of Mahé. Jean-Louis then moved to Anse-aux-Pins FC (who represented the administrative district of Anse-aux-Pins). Jean-Louis next moved to Seychelles First Division club St Michel United. Why playing for St Michel United he won the 2001 Seychelles FA Cup and 2003 Seychelles First Division. He stopped playing for St Michel United in 2004.

=== International career ===
Jean-Louis played for the Seychelles national team for eleven years from 1990 to 2000. He played in at least one full international, a 1–1 draw with Namibia on 8 April 2000 in qualifying for the 2002 FIFA World Cup. In that match he was substituted off at half-time with Jude Ladouce replacing him. Jean-Louis has won two medals in football at the Indian Ocean Island Games. He won a bronze at Madagascar 1990 and a second bronze at Réunion 1998. At the 1993 Indian Ocean Island Games, which was the first Indian Ocean Island Games held in Seychelles, Jean-Louis scored a goal in the third-place playoff but Seychelles eventually lost 6–2 to Mauritius.

== Managerial career ==
=== St Michel United ===
Jean-Louis has coached St Michel United in two different spells. His first spell ended in early 2011, soon after he was appointed national team coach. He left after a CAF Champions League match against Young Buffaloes F.C. from Swaziland. He won quite a few title with the club in his first spell.

After being sacked from the national team, Jean-Louis re-joined St Michel United. Then in 2015 he left again, due to being re-hired by the national team. He thanked St Michel United for their understanding.

=== Seychelles ===
Jean-Louis was first appointed the manager of the Seychelles national team in December 2010, replacing Andrew Amers-Morrison as head coach. After his appointment, Jean-Louis said that his objective with the team was, "Reaching the Indian Ocean Island Games final and making local fans proud with a win."

At the 2011 Indian Ocean Island Games held in Seychelles, Jean-Louis's team was drawn in group A with Mauritius, Comoros and the Maldives. The team's first game was on 4 August 2011 against Comoros with the game ending in a 0–0 draw. Seychelles' second group game was against Mauritius and goals from Nelson Laurence and Archille Henriette secured Seychelles a 2–1 win. In their final group game, the Jean-Louis led Seychelles beat the Maldives 5–1. This meant the team progressed to the semi-finals as group winners on seven points, three points ahead of Mauritius and five points ahead of both Comoros and the Maldives. In the semi-finals Jean-Louis's team faced Réunion. Seychelles won in extra time 2–1 after a 118th-minute winner from Karl Hall. In the final, Seychelles would face Mauritius, a team they beat 2–1 in the group stage. The game finished 1–1 after extra time so the game went to penalties. Seychelles won the shootout 4–3, and in doing so won the gold medal. Jean-Louis left the team soon after the Indian Ocean Island Games victory.

Jean-Louis was re-appointed manager of Seychelles in September 2015, replacing Ulric Mathiot. In an interview with Seychelles Life after his appointment, Jean-Louis said, "I took it up this time as a challenge for me to see if I can do better than last time." He was one of four applicants for the job and the only local one. His first match in his second spell as manager was against Burundi on 7 October 2015 in the first round of African qualifying for the 2018 FIFA World Cup. The team lost 1–0 before losing the second leg 2–0 and being knocked out of qualifying for the World Cup.

== Honours ==
=== Player ===
Seychelles

- Indian Ocean Island Games: Bronze Medalist, 1990, 1998

=== Manager ===
Seychelles

- Indian Ocean Island Games: Gold Medalist, 2011
