= Benoit Marie =

Seychellois footballer

Personal information
- Full name: Benoit Stenio Steve Marie
- Date of birth: 26 December 1992 (age 33)
- Place of birth: Seychelles
- Height: 2.01 m (6 ft 7 in)
- Position: Defender

Team information
- Current team: Côte d'Or

Senior career*
Years	Team	Apps	(Gls)
2012–	Côte d'Or		

International career^{‡}
2011–	Seychelles	64	(0)
- * Club domestic league appearances and goals ‡ National team caps and goals as of 13:24, 9 January 2026 (UTC)

Benoit Stenio Steve Marie (born 26 December 1992) is a Seychellois professional footballer who plays as a defender and has spent his entire career with Seychelles Premier League club Côte d'Or and the Seychelles national team.

He has represented Seychelles during 2019 Africa Cup of Nations qualification.

== Honours ==
Côte d'Or

- Seychelles Premier League: 2013, 2016, 2018, 2024–25; runner-up 2017, 2019–20; third place 2012, 2014, 2022–23
- Seychelles FA Cup: runner-up 2019–20

Seychelles

- Four Nations Football Tournament: 2021
