= Adrian Fisher =

Adrian Fisher may refer to:

- Adrian Fisher (maze designer) (born 1951), British maze and puzzle designer
- Adrian Fisher (musician) (1952–2000), British guitarist
- Adrian Fisher (football coach), English football manager
- Adrian S. Fisher (1914–1983), American lawyer and federal public servant
- Adrian Fisher (Louisiana politician), member of the Louisiana House of Representatives
