= Carlos Simeon =

Seychellois footballer (born 2005)

Personal information
- Full name: Carlos Dominique Simeon
- Date of birth: 29 October 1998 (age 28)
- Place of birth: Plaisance, Seychelles
- Height: 1.90 m (6 ft 3 in)
- Positions: Midfielder; goalkeeper

Youth career
- 2014–2016: Hendon
- 2016–2017: Tower Hamlets
- 2017: Marítimo
- 2017–2018: Ware

Senior career*
Years	Team	Apps	(Gls)
2018	Saint Louis Suns United		
2019–2020	Northern Dynamo		
2021	Clapton	7	(0)
2021	Romford	20	(0)
2022	Brentwood Town	5	(0)
2022	Hashtag United	4	(0)
2022–2023	Lynx	0	(0)

International career^{‡}
2017–	Seychelles	5	(0)
- * Club domestic league appearances and goals ‡ National team caps and goals as of 16:26, 18 February 2022 (UTC)

Carlos Simeon (born 17 February 2005) is a Seychellois footballer who currently most recently played for Lynx F.C. and the Seychelles national team.

== Club career ==
Simeon was born in the La Louise in Plaisance, Seychelles. He and his family moved to the North London, England at age 7. He began playing football at age 11 or 12. As a youth he played for Finchley Revolution before moving to Alexandra Park. He then moved to Hendon where he decided to focus on a career in football. He spent the 2015/2016 season with Hendon's under-18 squad as the team finished fourth in its league. After playing for Hendon's under-16 and under-18 teams, he moved to Tower Hamlets. In 2017 while with the club he competed in a tournament in Portugal against local teams including C.S. Marítimo at age 17. He impressed the Portuguese side enough in the tournament to be offered a spot with the club.

Following his departure from Marítimo, Simeon returned to England and signed for Ware FC. He scored against Wingate & Finchley in November 2017. In early 2018 he signed for Saint Louis Suns United for his first experience in the Seychelles League. During his stint with the club he went on to make one appearance in 2018 CAF Champions League qualification against Young Africans of Tanzania in addition to league matches. By May 2018 he had returned to England re-joined Ware FC. By July 2019 Simeon returned to the Seychelles League with Northern Dynamos.

In 2021 Simeon played for Clapton. Later that year, he joined Romford of the Essex Senior League. In August of that year, he left a match against Barking with a head injury for which he was hospitalized. The following year, Simeon made five appearances for Brentwood Town before moving to Hashtag United.

From 2022 to 2023, Simeon spent a year in Gibraltar with Lynx F.C. of the Gibraltar Football League. For the entire duration of his contract, he did not touch a football and was allegedly housed in an unsanitary accommodation. The situation, which also included alleged racial abuse from the Lynx owner, found the player in a legal battle to be settled in court.

== International career ==
Eligible to represent both England and the Seychelles internationally, Simeon indicated in 2017 that he hoped to represent the Seychelles. Simeone received his first international call-up as part of the Seychelles' senior squad for the 2017 COSAFA Cup. He went on to make his debut in the tournament in a 1–2 loss to Mozambique on 28 June. He returned for the 2018 edition of the tournament and was the Seychelles' only player to play abroad.

=== International career statistics ===
As of match played 20 November 2023

Seychelles national team
Year	Apps	Goals
2017	2	0
2018	1	0
2019	0	0
2020	0	0
2021	0	0
2022	0	0
2023	2	0
Total	5	0
