= Nees (surname) =

People with the surname Nees include:

- Christian Gottfried Daniel Nees von Esenbeck (1776–1858), German botanist and natural philosopher
- Theodor Friedrich Ludwig Nees von Esenbeck (1787–1837), German botanist and pharmacologist
- Georg Nees (1926–2016), German academic and a pioneer of computer art
- Vic Nees (1936–2013), Belgian composer and musicologist
- Michael Nees (born 1967), German football player and coach
