= Vivian Bothe =

Seychellois football manager

Personal information
- Full name: Neville Vivian Bothe
- Date of birth: 8 February 1970 (age 56)
- Place of birth: Seychelles

Team information
- Current team: Seychelles (manager)

Managerial career
- Years: Team
- St Michel United
- 2021–2023: Seychelles
- 2026–: Seychelles

Neville Vivian Bothe (born 8 February 1970) is a Seychellois football manager.

== Managerial career ==
In September 2021, following stints as manager of St Michel United and assistant manager of the Seychelles, Bothe was appointed manager of the Seychelles. Two months after Bothe's appointment, the Seychelles won the 2021 Four Nations Football Tournament.
