= Mathiot =

Mathiot is a surname. Notable people with this surname include:

- Ginette Mathiot (1907–1998), French food writer and home economist
- John Mathiot (fl. 1831–1843), American politician
- Joshua Mathiot (1800–1849), American politician
- Lorenzo Mathiot (born 1977), Seychellois footballer
- Madeleine Mathiot (1927–2020), American linguist
- Michel Mathiot (1926–1999), French gymnast
- Télie Mathiot (born 1987), French pole vaulter
- Ulric Mathiot (fl. 1991–2015), Seychellois footballer and manager
