= Jeitoso =

Mozambican professional footballer (born 1991)

Personal information
- Full name: João Pedro Mussica
- Date of birth: 5 April 1991 (age 35)
- Place of birth: Maputo, Mozambique
- Height: 1.85 m (6 ft 1 in)
- Position: Defender

Team information
- Current team: Ferroviário de Maputo

Youth career
- 2005–2012: Ferroviário de Maputo

Senior career*
| Years | Team | Apps | (Gls) |
| 2012–2017 | Ferroviário de Maputo | | |
| 2017–2018 | Cape Town City | 0 | (0) |
| 2018– | Ferroviário de Maputo | | |

International career^{‡}
| 2015– | Mozambique | 30 | (3) |
- * Club domestic league appearances and goals ‡ National team caps and goals as of 1 October 2022

João Pedro Mussica (born 5 April 1991), commonly known as Jeitoso, is a Mozambican professional footballer who plays for Ferroviário de Maputo and the Mozambique national team. He primarily plays as a left-sided centre-back.

== Club career ==
Jeitoso began his youth career at Ferroviário de Maputo, going on to make his professional debut for the Mozambican champions in 2013, winning back-to-back league titles in his first years.

In June 2017, he was signed by South African Premier Division club Cape Town City in preparation for their 2017–18 South African Premier League campaign. The reigning South African Cup champions will add Jeitoso to their back-line alongside fellow Mozambican and former teammate Edmilson who was signed by Cape Town City during the 2016–17 season. He returned to Mozambique in January 2018.

== International career ==
Jeitoso plays as a centre-back and captain for the Mozambican national team.

== Career statistics ==
=== Club ===
As of match played 30 May 2019.

| Club | Season | League | | | Cup | | Continental | | Other | | Total | |
| Club | Season | Division | Apps | Goals | Apps | Goals | Apps | Goals | Apps | Goals | Apps | Goals |
|---|---|---|---|---|---|---|---|---|---|---|---|---|
| Cape Town City | 2017–18 | South African Premier Division | 0 | 0 | 0 | 0 | 0 | 0 | 0 | 0 | 0 | 0 |
| Career total | | | 0 | 0 | 0 | 0 | 0 | 0 | 0 | 0 | 0 | 0 |

=== International ===
As of match played 30 May 2019.

| National team | Year | Apps | Goals |
|---|---|---|---|
Mozambique
| Mozambique | 2015 | 4 | 0 |
| Mozambique | 2016 | 9 | 0 |
| Mozambique | 2017 | 3 | 0 |
| Mozambique | 2018 | 5 | 2 |
| Mozambique | 2019 | 4 | 1 |
| Total | | 25 | 3 |

=== International goals ===
Scores and results list Mozambique's goal tally first.

| No | Date | Venue | Opponent | Score | Result | Competition |
|---|---|---|---|---|---|---|
| 1. | 29 May 2018 | Seshego Stadium, Polokwane, South Africa | Comoros | 1–0 | 3–0 | 2018 COSAFA Cup |
| 2. | 31 May 2018 | Peter Mokaba Stadium, Polokwane, South Africa | Seychelles | 2–1 | 2–1 | 2018 COSAFA Cup |
| 3. | 30 May 2019 | King Zwelithini Stadium, Umlazi, South Africa | Malawi | 1–1 | 1–1 | 2019 COSAFA Cup |

== Honours ==
=== Club ===
Ferroviário de Maputo

- Moçambola: 2015

=== International ===
Mozambique

- COSAFA Cup: 2015 runners-up
