= Gavin Jeanne =

Seychellois football manager

Gavin Jeanne is a Seychellois professional football manager. He is the head coach of the Seychelles national under-17 football team and a former caretaker-coach of the Seychelles national football team.

On 28 March 2018, Jeanne was appointed manager Seychelles national football team on a two-year contract.
