= Makhan Bristol-Cissoko =

Seychelles footballer (born 2006)

Personal information
- Full name: Makhan Jean-Luc Bristol-Cissoko
- Date of birth: 26 June 2006 (age 20)
- Position: Defender

Team information
- Current team: Foresters Mont Fleuri
- Number: 11

Senior career*
Years	Team	Apps	(Gls)
2023–	Foresters Mont Fleuri	89	(5)

International career^{‡}
2023–	Seychelles	6	(0)
- * Club domestic league appearances and goals ‡ National team caps and goals as of 13:22, 8 July 2024 (UTC)

Makhan Bristol-Cissoko (born 26 June 2006) is a Seychellois footballer who plays as a defender for Foresters Mont Fleuri and the Seychelles national team.

== Club career ==
Bristol-Cissoko came up through the youth ranks at Foresters Mont Fleuri. In 2022, he was invited to a training camp in France. By the 2023/2024 Seychelles Premier League season, he was part of the Foresters senior team setup. In February 2024, he scored against Côte d'Or to help secure the victory and the Foresters’ place at the top of the league table. Following the match, he won the league's Player of the Round award for his performance. Following the campaign, Bristol-Cissoko was named the Young Player of the Season, finishing ahead of Lorenzo Hoareau, and as a member of the Team of the Season in the wing-back position.

In July 2024, Bristol-Cissoko went on trial with FK Radnički 1923 of the Serbian SuperLiga after being noticed by a scout while playing with the national team. On 23 July 2024, he appeared for the club in a friendly against FK Gruža.

== International career ==
In November 2022, Bristol-Cissoko was named to the Seychelles’ under-17 squad for 2023 Africa U-17 Cup of Nations qualification. He was a part of the Seychelles’ starting eleven in the tournament, including in the nation’s opening defeat to South Africa.

In November 2023, Bristol-Cissoko was called up to the senior national team for 2026 FIFA World Cup qualification matches against the Ivory Coast and Kenya. At 17, he was the youngest player in the squad. He made his senior debut on 17 November 2023 in the first match against the Ivory Coast.

=== International career statistics ===
As of match played 1 July 2024

Seychelles national team
Year	Apps	Goals
2023	2	0
2024	4	0
Total	6	0
