= 2017 Africa Cup of Nations qualification Group J =

Football tournament qualification stage

Group J of the 2017 Africa Cup of Nations qualification tournament was one of the thirteen groups to decide the teams which qualified for the 2017 Africa Cup of Nations finals tournament. The group consisted of four teams: Algeria, Ethiopia, Lesotho, and Seychelles.

The teams played against each other home-and-away in a round-robin format, between June 2015 and September 2016.

Algeria, the group winners, qualified for the 2017 Africa Cup of Nations.

== Standings ==
Pos	Team	Pld	W	D	L	GF	GA	GD	Pts	Qualification	Algeria	Ethiopia	Seychelles	Lesotho
1	Algeria	6	5	1	0	25	5	+20	16	Final tournament	—	7–1	4–0	6–0
2	Ethiopia	6	3	2	1	11	14	−3	11		3–3	—	2–1	2–1
3	Seychelles	6	1	1	4	5	11	−6	4		0–2	1–1	—	2–0
4	Lesotho	6	1	0	5	5	16	−11	3		1–3	1–2	2–1	—

Source: CAF
Rules for classification: Qualification tiebreakers

== Matches ==
13 June 2015
20:30 UTC+1

Algeria	4–0	Seychelles
Slimani 21'; Soudani 34', 47'; Bentaleb 89'	Report

Stade Mustapha Tchaker, Blida
Referee: Mohamed Hamada (Mauritania)
14 June 2015
16:00 UTC+3

Ethiopia	2–1	Lesotho
Panom 65'; Saladin 77'	Report	Mothoana 41'

Bahir Dar Stadium, Bahir Dar
Referee: Malang Diedhiou (Senegal)

5 September 2015
16:30 UTC+4

Seychelles	1–1	Ethiopia
Laurence 23' (pen.)	Report	Tesfaye 52'

Stade Linité, Victoria
Referee: Hamada Nampiandraza (Madagascar)
6 September 2015
15:00 UTC+2

Lesotho	1–3	Algeria
Mokhahlane 38'	Report	Ghoulam 32'; Soudani 85', 90+1'

Setsoto Stadium, Maseru
Referee: Jackson Pavaza (Namibia)

25 March 2016
20:30 UTC+1

Algeria	7–1	Ethiopia
Feghouli 23', 48'; Slimani 32', 90+3'; Brahimi 72'; Taïder 75'; Ghezzal 80'	Report	Getaneh 85'

Stade Mustapha Tchaker, Blida
Referee: Victor Gomes (South Africa)
26 March 2016
16:30 UTC+4

Seychelles	2–0	Lesotho
Waye-Hive 2'; Suzette 78'	Report

Stade Linité, Victoria
Referee: Louis Hakizimana (Rwanda)

29 March 2016
15:00 UTC+2

Lesotho	2–1	Seychelles
Jane 23'; Khutlang 69'	Report	Suzette 15'

Setsoto Stadium, Maseru
Referee: Israel Mujuni (Tanzania)
29 March 2016
17:00 UTC+3

Ethiopia	3–3	Algeria
Getaneh 29', 48'; Fekadu 64'	Report	Slimani 43'; Mandi 62'; Ghoulam 85' (pen.)

Addis Ababa Stadium, Addis Ababa
Referee: Davies Omweno (Kenya)

2 June 2016
18:00 UTC+4

Seychelles	0–2	Algeria
	Report	Benzia 40'; Soudani 62'

Stade Linité, Victoria
Referee: El Fadil Mohamed (Sudan)
5 June 2016
15:00 UTC+2

Lesotho	1–2	Ethiopia
Thabantso 58'	Report	Getaneh 45', 53'

Setsoto Stadium, Maseru
Referee: Parmendra Nunkoo (Mauritius)

3 September 2016
16:00 UTC+3

Ethiopia	2−1	Seychelles
Getaneh 33'; Saladin 52' (pen.)	Report	Henriette 20'

Hawassa International Stadium, Awasa
Referee: Brian Miiro (Uganda)
4 September 2016
20:30 UTC+1

Algeria	6–0	Lesotho
Soudani 8', 38'; Mahrez 17', 74'; Taïder 24'; Boudebouz 45' (pen.)	Report

Stade Mustapha Tchaker, Blida
Referee: Sékou Ahmed Touré (Guinea)

== Goalscorers ==
7 goals

- (Algeria) Hillal Soudani

6 goals

- (Ethiopia) Getaneh Kebede

4 goals

- (Algeria) Islam Slimani

2 goals

- (Algeria) Sofiane Feghouli
- (Algeria) Faouzi Ghoulam
- (Algeria) Riyad Mahrez
- (Algeria) Saphir Taïder
- (Ethiopia) Saladin Said
- (Seychelles) Dine Suzette

1 goal

- (Algeria) Nabil Bentaleb
- (Algeria) Yassine Benzia
- (Algeria) Ryad Boudebouz
- (Algeria) Yacine Brahimi
- (Algeria) Rachid Ghezzal
- (Algeria) Aïssa Mandi
- (Ethiopia) Dawit Fekadu
- (Ethiopia) Gatoch Panom
- (Ethiopia) Seyoum Tesfaye
- (Lesotho) Sunny Jane
- (Lesotho) Tumelo Khutlang
- (Lesotho) Ralekoti Mokhahlane
- (Lesotho) Bokang Mothoana
- (Lesotho) Jane Thabantso
- (Seychelles) Achille Henriette
- (Seychelles) Nelson Laurence
- (Seychelles) Gervais Waye-Hive
