= Lorenzo Hoareau =

Seychelles footballer

Personal information
- Full name: Lorenzo Adrien Hoareau
- Date of birth: 6 January 2007 (age 19)
- Place of birth: Mont Fleuri, Seychelles
- Position: Midfielder

Team information
- Current team: Anse Réunion
- Number: 8

Youth career
- 2022–2023: Foresters Mont Fleuri

Senior career*
Years	Team	Apps	(Gls)
2023–2024	Foresters Mont Fleuri	8	(0)
2024–2025	Saint Louis Suns United	16	(4)
2025–2026	Anse Réunion	17	(4)
2026	→ Bazar Brothers (loan)	5	(3)

International career^{‡}
2022	Seychelles U17	3	(1)
2026	Seychelles U20		
2021–	Seychelles	7	(3)
- * Club domestic league appearances and goals ‡ National team caps and goals as of 14:54, 28 June 2024 (UTC)

Lorenzo Adrien Hoareau (born 6 January 2007) is a Seychellois footballer who plays as a midfielder for Anse Réunion and the Seychelles national team. In 2021, he became the youngest player from an African nation to score in a senior international fixture and second-youngest scorer worldwide.

== Youth career ==
In October 2021 Hoareau was named captain of his school football team in Mont Fleuri. In March 2022 he went on trial with Olympique de Marseille of the French Ligue 1. He was invited back for another trial the following year after he narrowly missed out on being signed by the club on his first attempt.

He returned to his Mont Fleuri school team in 2022. Following the season he was named the Seychelles school league's Player of the Year. In 2022 Hoareau also competed in the inaugural season of the U17 National League as a member of Foresters Mont Fleuri. He was tied for the scoring title with Dahan Fanchette of La Passe FC with ten goals each. Foresters finished in third place in the league table. Following the season, Hoareau was nominated for the Best Player Award, ultimately finishing runner-up to Fanchette.

== Club career ==
By January 2023, Hoareau was appearing for Foresters Mont Fleuri in the Seychelles Premier League, making his senior top-flight debut during the 2023/2024 season. By February 2024, Hoareau had moved to league rivals Saint Louis Suns United FC. He assisted on Charles Rakoto’s game-winning goal against Anse Réunion on matchday 12 to help the club move to the top of the table. Hoareau was then named player of the round for matchday 15. Saint Louis Suns FC went on to win the championship that season. Following the campaign, Hoareau finished second in the Young Player of the Season fan voting, narrowly losing to Makhan Bristol-Cissoko of Foresters. However, he won the Young Player of the Year award presented by the Seychelles Football Federation in June 2024.

Following the 2024 season, Hoareau went on trial in Europe with Red Star Belgrade of the Serbian SuperLiga. In October 2024, British newspaper The Guardian included Hoareau on its list of the sixty best young footballers from around the world. In January 2025, Hoareau transferred to Anse Réunion for the second half of the 2024-25 Seychelles Premier League season.

== International career ==
Hoareau was called up to the senior national team for a friendly tournament in Comoros in September 2021. He went on to make his senior international debut on 1 September 2021 in a match against the hosts. Three days later he earned his second cap and scored his first goal for the Seychelles in a 1–8 defeat to Burundi. At 14 years and 241 days, he became the youngest player from an African nation to score in a senior international fixture and second-youngest scorer worldwide, behind Aung Kyaw Tun.

In November 2022 Hoareau was named to the Seychelles’ under-17 squad for 2023 Africa U-17 Cup of Nations qualification. He went on to score the Seychelles' only goal in the campaign, part of a 1–7 defeat to Zambia on 5 December 2022.

Hoareau was recalled to the senior squad for 2026 FIFA World Cup qualification matches against the Ivory Coast and Kenya in November 2023. However, he was dropped from the squad because of injury. He returned to the squad in June 2024 for qualifiers against the Gambia and Burundi. In the latter match, Hoareau scored his second senior goal off a perfect pass from Brandon Labrosse in the eventual 1–3 defeat. Later that month, Hoareau was part of the Seychelles roster for the 2024 COSAFA Cup. He scored in the team's opening match against Lesotho to salvage a 1–1 draw with the last edition's runners-up.

=== International goals ===
Scores and results list the Seychelles' goal tally first.

No	Date	Venue	Opponent	Score	Result	Competition
1.	4 September 2021	Stade Omnisports de Malouzini, Moroni, Comoros	Burundi	1–6	1–8	Friendly
2.	11 June 2024	Berkane Municipal Stadium, Berkane, Morocco	Burundi	1–3	1–3	2026 FIFA World Cup qualification
3.	28 June 2024	Nelson Mandela Bay Stadium, Gqeberha, South Africa	Lesotho	1–1	1–1	2024 COSAFA Cup
Last updated 28 June 2024

=== International career statistics ===
As of match played 28 June 2024

Seychelles national team
Year	Apps	Goals
2021	2	1
2024	3	2
Total	5	3
