= Tumelo Khutlang =

Mosotho footballer (born 1995)

Personal information
- Full name: Tumelo Khutlang
- Date of birth: 23 October 1995 (age 31)
- Place of birth: Teyateyaneng, Lesotho
- Position: Forward

Team information
- Current team: Lijabatho FC
- Number: 25

Senior career*
Years	Team	Apps	(Gls)
–2015	Sandawana		
2015–2018	Lioli		
2019–2021	Black Leopards	12	(2)
2021— 2023	Swallows FC		
2023— 2024	Lioli FC		
2024 –	Lijabatho FC		

International career^{‡}
- Lesotho U20
2015–	Lesotho	31	(2)
- * Club domestic league appearances and goals ‡ National team caps and goals as of 22:58, 19 November 2019 (UTC)

Tumelo Khutlang (born 23 October 1995) is a Mosotho professional footballer who currently plays as a forward for Lijabatho Football Club in the Lesotho Premier League. He previously played for Moroka Swallows F.C. in the South African Premier Division

At the youth international level he played in the 2013 COSAFA U-20 Cup and 2015 African U-20 Championship qualifiers.

== International career ==
=== International goals ===
Scores and results list Lesotho's goal tally first.

No	Date	Venue	Opponent	Score	Result	Competition
1.	29 March 2016	Setsoto Stadium, Maseru, Lesotho	Seychelles	2–1	2–1	2017 Africa Cup of Nations qualification
2.	14 June 2016	Independence Stadium, Windhoek, Namibia	Angola	1–0	2–0	2016 COSAFA Cup
