= Bourahim Jaotombo =

Malagasy footballer

Personal information
- Full name: Bourahim Jaotombo
- Date of birth: September 19, 1992 (age 34)
- Place of birth: Ambilobe, Madagascar
- Position: Forward

Team information
- Current team: CNaPS Sport

Senior career*
Years	Team	Apps	(Gls)
2016	AS Adema		
2017–	CNaPS Sport		

International career^{‡}
2016–2018	Madagascar	17	(2)
- * Club domestic league appearances and goals as of 8 June 2018 ‡ National team caps and goals as of 8 June 2018

Bourahim Jaotombo (born 19 September 1992) is a Malagasy professional footballer who plays as a forward for CNaPS Sport and the Madagascar national team.

He played at the 2018 COSAFA Cup where he scored two goals.

== International goals ==
Scores and results list Mozambique's goal tally first.

No	Date	Venue	Opponent	Score	Result	Competition
1.	29 May 2018	Seshego Stadium, Polokwane, South Africa	Comoros	1–0	3–0	2018 COSAFA Cup
2.	31 May 2018	Peter Mokaba Stadium, Polokwane, South Africa	Seychelles	2–1	2–1	2018 COSAFA Cup
