= Alfie Walters =

Footballer (born 2002)

Personal information
- Date of birth: 28 September 2003 (age 23)
- Place of birth: Epsom, England
- Height: 1.78 m (5 ft 10 in)
- Position: Defender

Team information
- Current team: Metropolitan Police

Youth career
- Metropolitan Police

Senior career*
Years	Team	Apps	(Gls)
2023–	Metropolitan Police	102	(1)

International career^{‡}
2025–	Seychelles	5	(0)
- * Club domestic league appearances and goals as of 23:30, 28 August 2025 (UTC) ‡ National team caps and goals as of 15:00, 4 April 2025 (UTC)

Alfie Walters (born 28 September 2003) is a footballer who plays as a defender for Combined Counties League Premier Division South club Metropolitan Police. Born in England, he plays for the Seychelles national team.

== Club career ==
Walters began his career in the academy at Metropolitan Police, making his debut for the club in a 4–0 loss against Sutton Common Rovers on 12 August 2023. In Walters' debut season in senior football, he made 39 appearances in all competitions for the club.

== International career ==
Walters qualifies for Seychelles through his mother, who was born in the country. On 20 March 2025, Walters made his debut for Seychelles in a 3–0 loss against Gabon.
