= Bokang Mothoana =

Mosotho footballer (born 1987)

Personal information
- Full name: Bokang Left Mothoana
- Date of birth: 9 December 1987 (age 38)
- Place of birth: Maseru, Lesotho
- Position: Left-back

Team information
- Current team: Kick 4 Life

Senior career*
Years	Team	Apps	(Gls)
2005–2007	Likhopo Maseru	30	(13)
2007–2009	Union Sportive Monastir	22	(6)
2009	Likhopo Maseru	7	(4)
2010–2016	Union Sportive Monastir	46	(17)
2016–	Kick 4 Life		

International career^{‡}
2005–	Lesotho	36	(3)
- * Club domestic league appearances and goals ‡ National team caps and goals as of 08:59, 4 April 2017 (UTC)

Bokang Mothoana (born 9 December 1987) is a Mosotho former footballer who played as a Left back or Midfielder for Lesotho National team.

== Club career ==
Bokang Mothoana, who also goes by the nickname "lefty", started with Likhopo Maseru in 2005. In 2007, he transferred to Union Sportive Monstir for an unknown fee. He was part of the team who won the 2010-11 Ligue 2 by four points and subsequently played for the side in the top division. Mothoana, a left footed player, often played as a left wing-back during his seven years in Tunisia.

Mothoana departed US Monstir in the summer of 2014 due to ongoing political unrest in Tunisia. He trained briefly with the Lesotho national team in June before undergoing unsuccessful trials with South African club Supersport United F.C.

At the start of the 2016/17 season, Mothoana joined Kick4Life, a Lesotho football club and registered charity dedicated to social change. Now playing in a more attacking midfield role, he impressed with a number of important goals and assists as the club finished 4th in the Lesotho Premier League. Mothoana's efforts were recognised at an end of season awards ceremony where he was named Kick4Life player of the season by the club's Academy Director.

== Outside Football ==
On 25 November 2017, Mothoana became the first football player from Lesotho to join Common Goal, pledging one percent of his income to support football charities worldwide. This was confirmed on the organisation's Twitter page shortly afterwards.

== International career ==
Since 2005, he has won 13 caps and scored one goal for the Lesotho national football team.

=== International goals ===
Scores and results list Lesotho's goal tally first.

No	Date	Venue	Opponent	Score	Result	Competition
1.	14 April 2006	Setsoto Stadium, Maseru, Lesotho	Swaziland	2–0	5–0	Friendly
2.	15 November 2011	Prince Louis Rwagasore Stadium, Bujumbura, Burundi	Burundi	2–0	2–2	2014 FIFA World Cup qualification
3.	14 June 2015	Bahir Dar Stadium, Bahir Dar, Ethiopia	Ethiopia	1–0	1–2	2017 Africa Cup of Nations qualification
