= Arohasina Andrianarimanana =

Malagasy footballer

Andriamirado Dax Andrianarimanana
Personal information
- Full name: Andriamirado Arohasina Andrianarimanana
- Date of birth: 21 April 1991 (age 35)
- Place of birth: Antananarivo, Madagascar
- Height: 1.71 m (5 ft 7 in)
- Position: Attacking midfielder

Team information
- Current team: Fosa Juniors

Senior career*
Years	Team	Apps	(Gls)
2013	Tana FC Formation		
2014–2018	Fosa Juniors		
2018–2019	Kaizer Chiefs	10	(1)
2019–2021	Black Leopards	20	(0)
2021	Saint-Pierroise	1	(0)
2022–	Fosa Juniors		

International career^{‡}
2017–	Madagascar	41	(2)
- * Club domestic league appearances and goals as of 17 March 2026 ‡ National team caps and goals as of 17 March 2026

Andriamirado Arohasina Andrianarimanana (born 21 April 1991), commonly known by the nickname Dax, is a Malagasy footballer who plays as a midfielder for Fosa Juniors and the national team.

== Club career ==
In August 2018, Andrianarimanana made the move to Kaizer Chiefs. The transfer was a controversial one as his former club Fosa Juniors FC insisted that the player was still under contract with their club, while the Kaizer Chiefs' staff said that they were under the impression that Andrianarimanana was a free agent. Andrianarimanana signed a two-year deal with the club.

== International career ==
Andrianarimanana played at the 2017 and 2018 COSAFA Cup, in the latter competition he was named player of the tournament.

== Career statistics ==
=== International ===
As of matches played on 30 August 2025

Madagascar national team
Year	Apps	Goals
2017	11	0
2018	7	1
2019	4	0
2021	1	0
2022	4	1
2023	7	0
2025	7	0
Total	41	2

=== International goals ===
Scores and results list Mozambique's goal tally first.

No	Date	Venue	Opponent	Score	Result	Competition
1.	27 May 2018	Old Peter Mokaba Stadium, Polokwane, South Africa	Mozambique	1–0	2–1	2018 COSAFA Cup
2.	23 July 2022	Complexe Sportif de Côte d'Or, Saint Pierre, Mauritius	Seychelles	1–0	1–0	2022 African Nations Championship qualification

== Honours ==
=== Club ===
Fosa Juniors

- Coupe de Madagascar : 2017
- THB Champions League (1): 2023

Kaizer Chiefs

- Nedbank Cup : Runner-up: 2019

=== Individual ===
Kaizer Chiefs

- Best Squad (1) : ABSA Premiership 2019

National Team

- Man of the Match Mozambique group A (1) : COSAFA CUP 2018
- Man of the Match South Africa Quarter-finals (1) : COSAFA CUP 2018
- best player of the tournament (1) : COSAFA CUP 2018
- Knight Order of Madagascar: 2019
- African Nations Championship third place: 2022
- Man of the Match Niger Third place play-off (1) : CHAN 2022
- Man of the Match Mozambique Quarter-finals (1) : CHAN 2022
- Team of the Tournament : CHAN 2022
- African Nations Championship runner-up place: 2024

=== Record ===
- First Malagasy player elected best player of the COSAFA cup : 2018
