= Dine Suzette =

Seychellois footballer

Personal information
- Full name: Dine Suzette
- Date of birth: 28 February 1991 (age 35)
- Place of birth: Seychelles
- Position: Forward

Team information
- Current team: Côte d'Or FC

Senior career*
Years	Team	Apps	(Gls)
2014	Côte d'Or FC		
2016–	Côte d'Or FC		

International career^{‡}
2011–	Seychelles	9	(2)
- * Club domestic league appearances and goals as of 09:47, 27 March 2016 (UTC) ‡ National team caps and goals as of 09:47, 4 April 2017 (UTC)

Dine Suzette (born 28 February 1991) is a Seychellois football player who plays for Côte d'Or FC.

== International career ==
=== International goals ===
Scores and results list Seychelles' goal tally first.

No	Date	Venue	Opponent	Score	Result	Competition
1.	26 March 2016	Stade Linité, Victoria, Seychelles	Lesotho	2–0	2–0	2017 Africa Cup of Nations qualification
2.	29 March 2016	Setsoto Stadium, Maseru, Lesotho	Lesotho	1–1	1–2	2017 Africa Cup of Nations qualification
