= Gervais Waye-Hive =

Seychellois footballer

Personal information
- Full name: Gervais Waye-Hive
- Date of birth: 11 June 1988 (age 38)
- Place of birth: Seychelles
- Position: Winger

Team information
- Current team: St Louis FC
- Number: 11

Senior career*
Years	Team	Apps	(Gls)
2011	St Louis FC		
- Red Star FC
- Merstham FC
- Banstead FC
- Moleste FC
- St Michel FC
- St Louis FC

International career^{‡}
2012–	Seychelles	47	(6)
Medal record
Men's football
Representing Seychelles
Indian Ocean Island Games
Gold medal – first place	2011 Seychelles
- * Club domestic league appearances and goals as of 31 October 2015 ‡ National team caps and goals as of 17 November 2023

Gervais Waye-Hive (born 11 June 1988) is a Seychellois professional footballer who plays as a forward for St Louis FC.

== Career statistics ==
=== International ===
Scores and results list Seychelles' goal tally first.

No	Date	Venue	Opponent	Score	Result	Competition
1.	26 August 2014	Stade Linité, Victoria, Seychelles	Sri Lanka	1–0	1–2	Friendly
2.	28 August 2014	Stade Linité, Victoria, Seychelles	Sri Lanka	1–0	3–0	Friendly
3.	28 August 2014	Stade Linité, Victoria, Seychelles	Sri Lanka	3–0	3–0	Friendly
4.	20 June 2015	Estádio do Ferroviário, Beira, Mozambique	Mozambique	1–4	1–5	2016 African Nations Championship qualification
5.	26 March 2016	Stade Linité, Victoria, Seychelles	Lesotho	1–0	2–0	2017 Africa Cup of Nations qualification
6.	20 January 2020	Bangabandhu National Stadium, Dhaka, Bangladesh	Mauritius	1–0	2–2	2020 Bangabandhu Cup

== Honours ==
St Michel United

- Seychelles First Division: 2011, 2014

Seychelles

- Indian Ocean Island Games: Gold Medalist, 2011
