= Warren Mellie =

Seychellois association football player

Personal information
- Full name: Warren Mellie
- Date of birth: 1 October 1994 (age 32)
- Place of birth: Seychelles
- Position: Defender

International career
Years	Team	Apps	(Gls)
2011–	Seychelles	33	(3)

Warren Mellie (born October 1, 1994) is a Seychellois football player. He is a defender playing for the Seychelles national football team and has represented Seychelles in the AFCON 2018. He also plays for the Northern Dynamo FC.

== International goals ==
Last updated 11 July 2023.

No.	Date	Venue	Opponent	Score	Result	Competition
1	29 May 2018	Seshego Stadium, Polokwane, South Africa	Madagascar	1–1	1–1	2018 COSAFA Cup
2	13 November 2021	Racecourse Stadium, Colombo, Sri Lanka	Sri Lanka	1–0	1–0	2021 Four Nations Football Tournament
3	11 July 2023	Princess Magogo Stadium, KwaMashu, South Africa	Zambia	2–4	2–4	2023 COSAFA Cup
