= Michael Nees =

German footballer and coach

Personal information
- Date of birth: 23 July 1967 (age 59)
- Place of birth: Karlsruhe, West Germany

Senior career*
Years	Team	Apps	(Gls)
1992–1994	Karlsruher FV		
1993–1994	→ SG Oftersheim (loan)		
1995–1996	ASV Durlach		

Managerial career
- 2001: Japan (technical advisor)
- 2003–2004: Seychelles
- 2006–2007: Rwanda
- 2008–2009: South Africa (technical advisor)
- 2013–2015: Israel (technical director)
- 2013–2015: Israel U21
- 2017–2022: Kosovo (technical director)
- 2021–2022: Kosovo U21
- 2024–2025: Zimbabwe
- * Club domestic league appearances and goals

Michael Nees (born 23 July 1967) is a German professional football coach and former player who recently worked as manager of the Zimbabwe senior men's team until his sacking on 22 October 2025.

== Administrative career ==
At the end of January 2017, Nees start working as technical director in Football Federation of Kosovo and came with the recommendation and funding of the German Football Association, he would deal with all the technical work of Kosovo national teams starting from national youth teams to national senior team.

== Managerial career ==
On 14 February 2003, Seychelles signed with Ness after the former coach Dominique Bathenay before a year ago decided to resign.
