= Achille Henriette =

Seychellois footballer

Personal information
- Date of birth: 25 April 1987 (age 39)
- Position: Midfielder

Team information
- Current team: La Passe FC

Senior career*
Years	Team	Apps	(Gls)
2007	St. Louis Suns United		
2008–	La Passe		

International career^{‡}
2006–	Seychelles	39	(6)
- * Club domestic league appearances and goals ‡ National team caps and goals as of 20 July 2020

Achille Henriette (born 25 April 1987) is a Seychellois footballer who plays as a midfielder for La Passe FC and the Seychelles national football team.

== Career ==
=== International ===
Henriette made his senior international debut on 30 June 2006 in a 2-1 friendly victory over Tanzania. He scored his first senior international goal over five years later, netting the second goal of a 2–1 win over Mauritius at the Indian Ocean Games on 6 August 2011.

== Career statistics ==
=== International ===
As of matches played 3 September 2016.

National team	Year	Apps	Goals
Seychelles	2006	1	0
Seychelles	2007	2	0
Seychelles	2008	4	0
Seychelles	2009	3	0
Seychelles	2011	7	2
Seychelles	2012	1	0
Seychelles	2013	3	2
Seychelles	2014	3	1
Seychelles	2015	9	0
Seychelles	2016	6	1
Total		12	0

==== International goals ====
Scores and results list Seychelles' goal tally first.

Goal	Date	Venue	Opponent	Score	Result	Competition
1.	6 August 2011	Stade Linité, Victoria, Seychelles	Mauritius	2–0	2–1	2011 Indian Ocean Island Games
2.	9 August 2011	Stade Linité, Victoria, Seychelles	Maldives	3–1	5–1	2011 Indian Ocean Island Games
3.	27 November 2013	Stade Linité, Victoria, Seychelles	Maldives	2–1	3–1	Friendly
4.	29 November 2013	Stade Linité, Victoria, Seychelles	Maldives	2–1	2–1	Friendly
5.	28 August 2014	Stade Linité, Victoria, Seychelles	Sri Lanka	2–0	3–0	Friendly
6.	3 September 2016	Awassa Kenema Stadium, Awasa, Ethiopia	Ethiopia	1–0	1–2	2017 Africa Cup of Nations qualification
