= Godfrey Denis Armel =

Seychellois football player (born 1975)

Godfrey Denis Armel (born August 16, 1975) is a Seychellois football player. He played as a central back defender on the Seychelles national football team.
