= Adrian Fisher (football coach) =

English football manager

Personal information
- Place of birth: England

Managerial career
- Years: Team
- 1969-1973: Seychelles

Adrian Fisher is an English football manager who worked as head coach of the Seychelles national football team.

== Career ==
Fisher started his managerial career with the Seychelles national football team, a position he held until 1973.
