= Jan Mak =

Dutch football manager

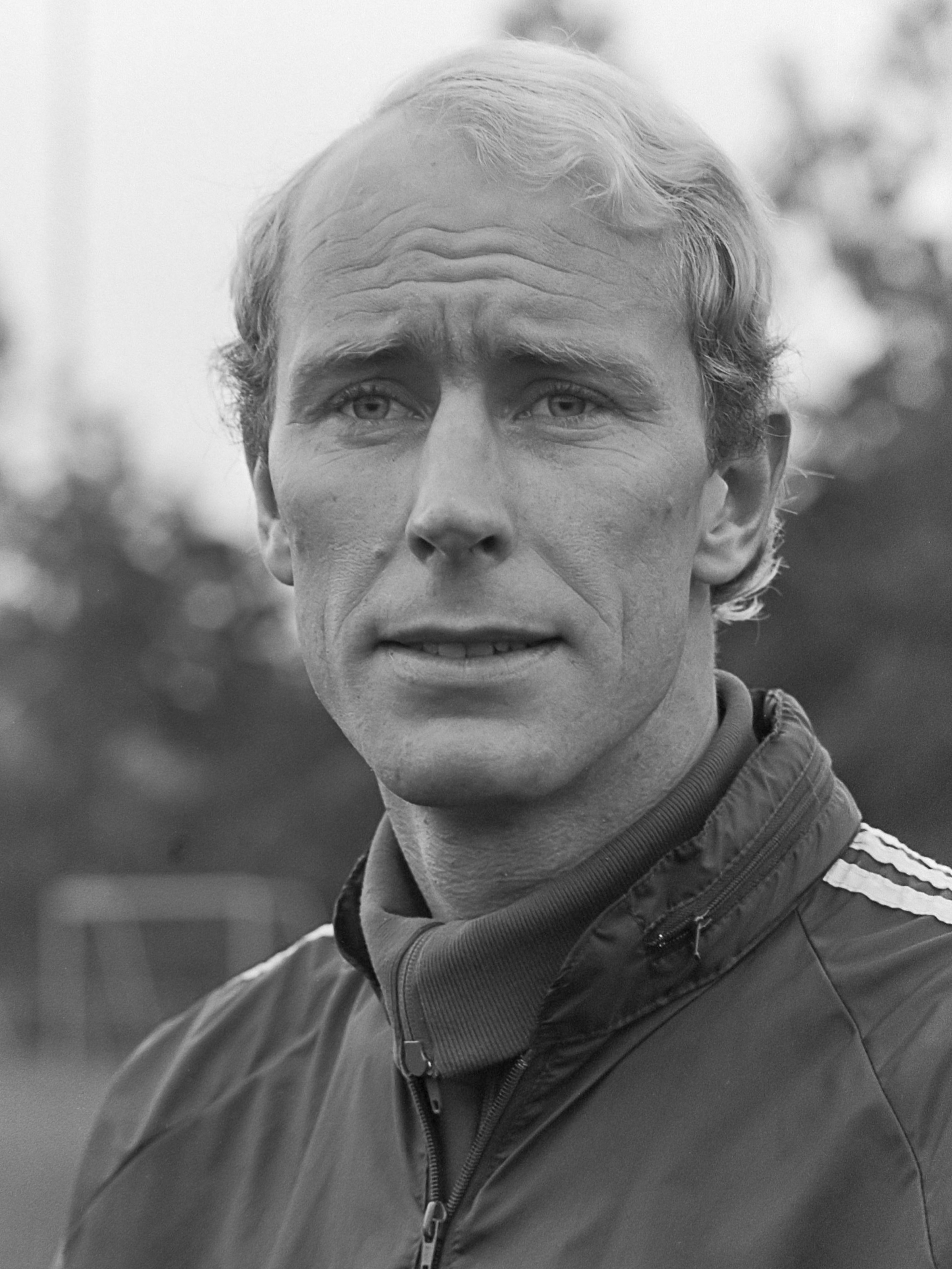
- Jan Mak with FC Volendam in 1977

Personal information
- Date of birth: 21 June 1945 (age 81)
- Place of birth: Voorburg, Netherlands

Managerial career
- Years: Team
- 1977–1979: FC Volendam
- 1981–1984: Halmstads BK
- 1985: IS Halmia
- 1986: IK Brage
- 1988–1990: IF Elfsborg
- 1994–1995: Nejmeh
- 1999: Tampereen Pallo-Veikot
- 2008–2010: Seychelles
- 2012: GAIS
- 2013–2014: Seychelles
- 2019: Seychelles

Jan Mak (born 21 June 1945) is a Dutch professional football manager.

== Career ==
He was caretaker at amateur side HVV Den Haag in 1971.

After managing FC Volendam in his native Netherlands, Mak took charge of Swedish sides Halmstads BK between 1981 and 1984, IS Halmia, IK Brage and IF Elfsborg between 1988 and 1990. He also coached Tampereen Pallo-Veikot from Finland and Nejmeh SC of Lebanon.

He later managed the national team of the Seychelles on three occasions.
