= 2018 COSAFA Cup =

Tournament details
- Host country: South Africa
- Dates: 27 May–9 June
- Teams: 14 (from 1 sub-confederation)
- Venue(s): 3 (in 1 host city)

Final positions
- Champions: Zimbabwe (6th title)
- Runners-up: Zambia
- Third place: Lesotho
- Fourth place: Madagascar

Tournament statistics
- Matches played: 23
- Goals scored: 48 (2.09 per match)
- Top scorer(s): (Botswana) Onkabetse Makgantai (5 goals)

The 2018 COSAFA Cup was the 18th edition of the COSAFA Cup, an international football competition consisting of national teams of member nations of the Council of Southern Africa Football Associations (COSAFA). In July 2017, it was reported that it would be hosted by Botswana in July 2018. However, in February 2018, COSAFA announced that South Africa would host the competition.

== Venues ==
Polokwane
Old Peter Mokaba Stadium	Seshego Stadium	Peter Mokaba Stadium
23.9241°S 29.4644°E	23.8548°S 29.3887°E	23.9248°S 29.4682°E
2018 COSAFA Cup is located in Limpopo

== Draw ==
The draw took place at the South African Football Association headquarters in Johannesburg on 18 April.

== Officials ==
Referees

- Thando Ndzandzeka (South Africa)
- Nomore Musundire (Zimbabwe)
- Hélder Martins De Carvalho (Angola)
- Bernard Camille (Seychelles)
- Ahmad Imtehaz Heeralall (Mauritius)
- Jackson Pavaza (Namibia)
- Hamada Nampiandraza (Madagascar)
- Tirelo Mositwane (Botswana)
- Celso Alvação (Mozambique)

Assistant Referees

- James Emile (Seychelles)
- Souru Phatsoane (Lesotho)
- Athenkosi Ndongeni (South Africa)
- Mervyn Van Wyk (South Africa)
- (Eswatini) Sifiso Nxumalo (Swaziland)
- Matheus Kanyanga (Namibia)
- Romeo Kasengele (Zambia)
- Fabien Cauvelet (Mauritius)
- Clemence Kanduku (Malawi)

== Group stage ==
=== Tiebreakers ===
The ranking of each team in each group was determined as follows:

1. Greatest number of points obtained in group matches
2. Goal difference in all group matches
3. Greatest number of goals scored in all group matches

=== Group A ===
Pos	Team	Pld	W	D	L	GF	GA	GD	Pts	Qualification
1	Madagascar	3	2	1	0	4	2	+2	7	Quarter-finals
2	Mozambique	3	2	0	1	6	3	+3	6	
3	Seychelles	3	0	2	1	2	3	−1	2	
4	Comoros	3	0	1	2	1	5	−4	1	

Rules for classification: Group stage tiebreakers
27 May 2018
14:00 (UTC+2)

Madagascar	2–1	Mozambique
Andrianarimanana 7'; Andriamanjato 62'	Report	Luís 53'

Old Peter Mokaba Stadium, Polokwane
Referee: Bernard Camille (Seychelles)
27 May 2018
16:30 (UTC+2)

Comoros	1–1	Seychelles
M'Changama 60'	Report	Coralie 83'

Old Peter Mokaba Stadium, Polokwane
Referee: Ahmad Imtehaz Heeralall (Mauritius)

29 May 2018
17:00 (UTC+2)

Mozambique	3–0	Comoros
Jeitoso 39'; Luís 44', 72'	Report

Seshego Stadium, Polokwane
Referee: Jackson Pavaza (Namibia)
29 May 2018
19:00 (UTC+2)

Seychelles	1–1	Madagascar
Mellie 35'	Report	Jaotombo 24'

Seshego Stadium, Polokwane
Referee: Thando Ndzandzeka (South Africa)

31 May 2018
17:30 (UTC+2)

Madagascar	1–0	Comoros
Jaotombo 45+1'	Report

Old Peter Mokaba Stadium, Polokwane
Referee: Tirelo Mositwane (Botswana)
31 May 2018
17:30 (UTC+2)

Mozambique	2–1	Seychelles
Luís 11' (pen.); Jeitoso 74'	Report	Tamboo 52'

Peter Mokaba Stadium, Polokwane
Referee: Thando Ndzandzeka (South Africa)

=== Group B ===
Pos	Team	Pld	W	D	L	GF	GA	GD	Pts	Qualification
1	Botswana	3	2	1	0	9	2	+7	7	Quarter-finals
2	Angola	3	1	1	1	2	2	0	4	
3	Mauritius	3	1	0	2	1	7	−6	3	
4	Malawi	3	0	2	1	1	2	−1	2	

Rules for classification: Group stage tiebreakers
28 May 2018
17:00 (UTC+2)

Botswana	2–1	Angola
Seakanyeng 5' (pen.); Makgantai 45'	Report	Kaporal 58'

Old Peter Mokaba Stadium, Polokwane
Referee: Hamada Nampiandraza (Madagascar)
28 May 2018
19:30 (UTC+2)

Mauritius	1–0	Malawi
Balisson 15'	Report

Old Peter Mokaba Stadium, Polokwane
Referee: Hélder Martins De Carvalho (Angola)

30 May 2018
17:00 (UTC+2)

Angola	1–0	Mauritius
Vincent 63' (o.g.)	Report

Old Peter Mokaba Stadium, Polokwane
Referee: Nomore Musundire (Zimbabwe)
30 May 2018
19:30 (UTC+2)

Malawi	1–1	Botswana
Sambani 7'	Report	Seakanyeng 88'

Old Peter Mokaba Stadium, Polokwane
Referee: Celso Alvação (Mozambique)

1 June 2018
17:30 (UTC+2)

Angola	0–0	Malawi
	Report

Peter Mokaba Stadium, Polokwane
Referee: Hamada Nampiandraza (Madagascar)
1 June 2018
17:30 (UTC+2)

Botswana	6–0	Mauritius
Makgantai 3', 70'; Phiri 16'; Kgamanyane 20'; Seakanyeng 27'; Maikano 55'	Report

Old Peter Mokaba Stadium, Polokwane
Referee: Jackson Pavaza (Namibia)

== Knockout stage ==
Quarter-finals
Zambia	0 (4)
Namibia	0 (3)
South Africa	0 (3)
Madagascar	0 (4)
Lesotho	1
Swaziland	0
Zimbabwe	1 (3)
Botswana	1 (1)

Semi-finals
Zambia	1
Madagascar	0
Lesotho	0 (1)
Zimbabwe	0 (3)

Final
Zambia	2
Zimbabwe	4
Third place
Madagascar	0
Lesotho	1

=== Quarter-finals ===
2 June 2018
15:00 (UTC+2)

Zambia	0–0 (a.e.t.)	Namibia
Penalties
Sikombe (penalty scored); Chirwa (penalty scored); Kambole (penalty missed); Nsabata (penalty scored); Chama (penalty scored)	4–3	(penalty missed) Ketjijere; (penalty missed) Hanamub; (penalty scored) Martin; (penalty scored) Keimuine; (penalty scored) Haoseb

Peter Mokaba Stadium, Polokwane
Referee: Tirelo Mositwane (Botswana)

2 June 2018
17:30 (UTC+2)

Lesotho	1–0	Swaziland
Motebang 71'

Peter Mokaba Stadium, Polokwane
Referee: Nomore Musundire (Zimbabwe)

3 June 2018
15:00 (UTC+2)

South Africa	0–0 (a.e.t.)	Madagascar
Penalties
Madisha (penalty scored); Foster (penalty scored); Modiba (penalty scored); Webber (penalty missed); Singh (penalty missed)	3–4	(penalty missed) Rabeson; (penalty scored) Rakotondrazaka; (penalty scored) Rakotoarisoa; (penalty scored) Andrianarimanana; (penalty scored) Njakanirina

Peter Mokaba Stadium, Polokwane
Referee: Ahmad Imtehaz Heeralall (Mauritius)

3 June 2018
17:30 (UTC+2)

Zimbabwe	1–1 (a.e.t.)	Botswana
Rusike 39'		Makgantai 60'
Penalties
Amidu (penalty scored); Mukombwe (penalty scored); Billiat (penalty scored)	3–1	(penalty scored) Seakanyeng; (penalty missed) Sosome; (penalty missed) Orebonye; (penalty missed) Kgamanyane

Peter Mokaba Stadium, Polokwane
Referee: Hélder Martins De Carvalho (Angola)

=== Semi-finals ===
6 June 2018
17:00 (UTC+2)

Zambia	1–0	Madagascar
Kambole 39'

Peter Mokaba Stadium, Polokwane
Referee: Jackson Pavaza (Namibia)

6 June 2018
19:30 (UTC+2)

Lesotho	0–0 (a.e.t.)	Zimbabwe
Penalties
Kalake (penalty missed); Moremoholo (penalty missed); Nkoto (penalty scored); Thabantso (penalty missed)	1–3	(penalty scored) Billiat; (penalty scored) Mukombwe; (penalty scored) Mudimu

Peter Mokaba Stadium, Polokwane
Referee: Ahmad Imtehaz Heeralall (Mauritius)

=== Third-placed playoff ===
8 June 2018
19:30 (UTC+2)

Madagascar	0–1	Lesotho
		Nkoto 10'

Peter Mokaba Stadium, Polokwane
Referee: Celso Alvação (Mozambique)

=== Final ===
9 June 2018
15:00 (UTC+2)

Zambia	2–4 (a.e.t.)	Zimbabwe
Kambole 8', 50'		Kadewere 4', 90+3'; Billiat 101' (pen.), 117'

Peter Mokaba Stadium, Polokwane
Referee: Hélder Martins De Carvalho (Angola)

== Plate ==
Semi-finals
Namibia	1
South Africa	4
Swaziland	0
Botswana	2

Final
South Africa	3
Botswana	0

=== Semi-finals ===
5 June 2018
17:00 (UTC+2)

Namibia	1–4	South Africa
Hotto 39'	Report	Modiba 26' (pen.); Maboe 29', 40'; Xulu 54'

Old Peter Mokaba Stadium, Polokwane
Referee: Celso Alvação (Mozambique)

5 June 2018
19:30 (UTC+2)

Swaziland	0–2	Botswana
	Report	Makgantai 9'; Mohutsiwa 90+3'

Old Peter Mokaba Stadium, Polokwane
Referee: Bernard Camille (Seychelles)

=== Final ===
8 June 2018
17:00 (UTC+2)

South Africa	3–0	Botswana
Madisha 39'; Modiba 78'; Maboe 89'	Report

Peter Mokaba Stadium, Polokwane
Referee: Hamada Nampiandraza (Madagascar)
