= Mohamed Mouigni =

Comorian footballer

Personal information
- Date of birth: 30 November 1981 (age 44)
- Place of birth: Comoros
- Height: 1.75 m (5 ft 9 in)
- Position: Forward

Team information
- Current team: Élan Club

Senior career*
Years	Team	Apps	(Gls)
2009–	Élan Club		

International career
2007–	Comoros	8	(2)
- * Club domestic league appearances and goals

Mohamed Mouigni (born 30 November 1981) is a Comorian footballer who plays as a forward for Élan Club.

== Career ==
In 2009, Mouigni began his career for the Élan Club. He made his international debut for the Comoros national team in 2007.
