= Ulric Mathiot =

Seychellois footballer and manager

Personal information
- Place of birth: Seychelles

International career
Years	Team	Apps	(Gls)
198x–199x	Seychelles		

Managerial career
- 1991: Seychelles
- 2008: Seychelles
- 2014–2015: Seychelles

Ulric Mathiot is a Seychellois professional football player and manager.

== Career ==
Ulric Mathiot represented the Seychelles national football team as a player at the Indian Ocean Island Games 1990 when the team won the bronze medal.

He went on to coach the national team in 1991 and 2008. He has been the national Technical director of the Seychelles since 2010 and also coached other coaches in his capacity as a FIFA and CAF instructor.

In April 2014, following the resignation of Jan Mak in 2013, he once again became coach of the national team.

== Honours ==
- Indian Ocean Island Games: 1

3rd place: 1990
