= Jameson Mukombwe =

Zimbabwean footballer (born 1991)

Personal information
- Date of birth: 5 July 1991 (age 35)
- Place of birth: Zimbabwe
- Position: Right back

Team information
- Current team: Triangle United

Senior career*
Years	Team	Apps	(Gls)
2013–2019	Black Rhinos		
2016	→ Chapungu United (loan)		
2018	→ Platinum (loan)		
2020–	Triangle United		

International career^{‡}
2017–	Zimbabwe	5	(0)
- * Club domestic league appearances and goals as of 17 March 2019 ‡ National team caps and goals as of 17 March 2019

Jameson Mukombwe (born 5 July 1991) is a Zimbabwean footballer who plays as a defender for Triangle United and the Zimbabwe national football team.
