= Elijah Tamboo =

Seychellois footballer

Personal information
- Date of birth: 22 October 1993 (age 33)
- Position: Forward

Team information
- Current team: Saint Louis Suns United

Senior career*
Years	Team	Apps	(Gls)
2015–	Saint Louis Suns United		

International career^{‡}
2016–	Seychelles	17	(2)
Medal record
Saint Louis Suns
Runner-up	Seychelles First Division	2015
Winner	Seychelles First Division	2017
Runner-up	Seychelles First Division	2018
- * Club domestic league appearances and goals as of 3 June 2018 ‡ National team caps and goals as of 24 February 2023

Elijah Tamboo (born 22 October 1993) is a Seychellois professional footballer who plays as a forward for Seychelles First Division side Saint Louis Suns United.

== Career statistics ==
=== Club ===
As of 3 June 2018.

Club	Season	League			Cup		Continental		Other		Total	
Club	Season	Division	Apps	Goals	Apps	Goals	Apps	Goals	Apps	Goals	Apps	Goals
Saint Louis Suns United	2018	Seychelles First Division	?	?	?	?	2 (Note: Appearances in the CAF Champions League)	0	?	?	2	0
Career total			?	?	?	?	2	0	?	?	2	0

=== International ===
As of matches played 3 June 2018.

National team	Year	Apps	Goals
Seychelles	2016	4	0
Seychelles	2017	5	0
Seychelles	2018	1	1
Total		10	1

=== International goals ===
Scores and results list the Seychelles' goal tally first.

No	Date	Venue	Opponent	Score	Result	Competition
1.	31 May 2018	Old Peter Mokaba Stadium, Polokwane, South Africa	Mozambique	1–1	1–2	2018 COSAFA Cup
