= Jean-Noël Laboiteuse =

Mauritian footballer

Personal information
- Full name: Jean-Noël Laboiteuse
- Date of birth: 12 January 1977 (age 49)
- Place of birth: Mauritius
- Position: Midfielder

Senior career*
Years	Team	Apps	(Gls)
2006–2008	US Beau-Bassin/Rose Hill	?	(?)

International career
2002–2007	Mauritius	9	(1)
- * Club domestic league appearances and goals

Jean-Noël Laboiteuse (born 12 January 1977) is a Mauritian former international footballer who played as a midfielder. He won nine caps and scored one goal for the Mauritius national football team between 2002 and 2007.
