= Andrew Amers-Morrison =

British association football coach

Personal information
- Full name: Andrew Amers-Morrison
- Date of birth: 20 September 1970 (age 56)
- Place of birth: Scotland

Managerial career
- Years: Team
- 2010: Seychelles

Andrew Amers-Morrison (born 20 January 1970) is a British association football coach based in London.

Amers-Morrison founded a soccer community club for youth in London in 2005. In 2009, he received a GG2 Leadership & Diversity Award for his efforts.

In September 2010 he was appointed as manager of the Seychelles national football team. He was appointed after visiting the country on holiday and the Seychellois football officials mistakenly believed him to be Scottish former Manchester City player Andy Morrison.

Suketu Patel, chairman of the Seychelles Football Federation (SFF) conceded "We thought we were getting the real Andy Morrison".

Initially the SFF offered him a two-year contract but reduced it to six months when they realised their error. The SFF sacked him two weeks later because they "could no longer be certain if he was still the right person to head the coaching staff of the national team". Reportedly, he travelled to the 2010 COSAFA U-20 Cup with the squad, where Seychelles lost their two games and did not advance past the group stage.
