= Nelson Laurence =

Seychellois footballer

Nelson Laurence (born 19 October 1984) is a Seychellois football player. He is a striker playing for the Seychelles national football team.

== International career ==
=== International goals ===
Scores and results list Seychelles' goal tally first.

No	Date	Venue	Opponent	Score	Result	Competition
1.	6 August 2011	Stade Linité, Victoria, Seychelles	Mauritius	1–0	2–1	2011 Indian Ocean Island Games
2.	9 August 2011	Stade Linité, Victoria, Seychelles	Maldives	1–0	5–1	2011 Indian Ocean Island Games
3.	5 September 2015	Stade Linité, Victoria, Seychelles	Ethiopia	1–0	1–1	2017 Africa Cup of Nations qualification
