= 2021 Four Nations Football Tournament =

International football tournament

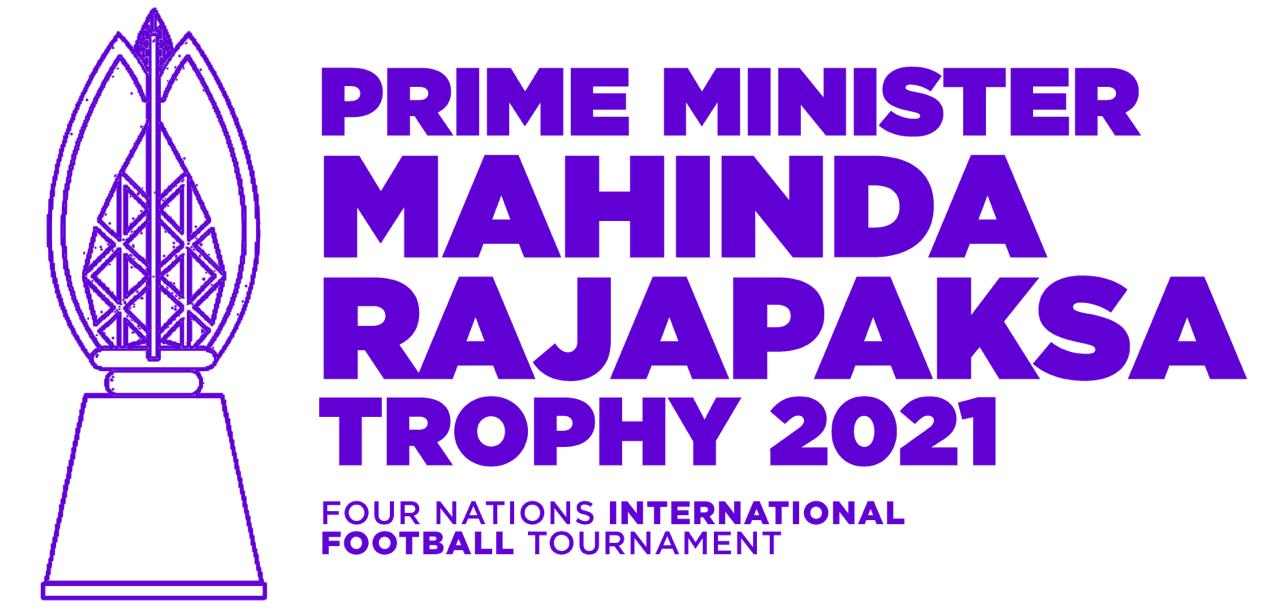

Tournament details
- Host country: Sri Lanka
- City: Colombo
- Dates: 9–19 November 2021
- Teams: 4 (from 2 confederations)
- Venue: 1 (in 1 host city)

Final positions
- Champions: Seychelles
- Runners-up: Sri Lanka

Tournament statistics
- Matches played: 7
- Goals scored: 23 (3.29 per match)
- Attendance: 14,728 (2,104 per match)
- Top scorer(s): (Sri Lanka) Ahmed Waseem Razeek (7 goals)

The 2021 Four Nations Football Tournament (Sinhala: 2021 සිව් ජාතීන්ගේ පාපන්දු තරඟාවලිය), alternatively known as the Prime Minister Mahinda Rajapaksa Trophy, was an international association football friendly tournament organised by Football Sri Lanka (FSL). It took place from 9 to 19 November 2021 at the Colombo Racecourse in Colombo.

== Venue ==
All matches will be held at the Racecourse Ground in Colombo, Sri Lanka.

Colombo	Colombo is located in Sri Lanka
Racecourse Ground	Colombo is located in Sri Lanka
Capacity: 10,000	Colombo is located in Sri Lanka

== Participants countries ==
The following four teams will contest in the tournament. FIFA ranking as of 21 October 2021.

Country	Confederation	FIFA Ranking	Confederation Ranking
Bangladesh	AFC	187	40
Maldives	AFC	156	32
Seychelles	CAF	199	53
Sri Lanka (Host)	AFC	204	46

== Officials ==
=== Referees ===
- (Qatar) Mohammed Ahmed Al-Shammari
- (Qatar) Abdulhadi Al Asmar Al Ruaile
- (Sri Lanka) Kasun Lakmal Weerakkody
- (Sri Lanka) Hettikamkanamge Perera
- (Sri Lanka) Nivon Robesh

=== Assistant Referees ===
- (Qatar) Faisal Eid Al-Shammari
- (Qatar) Majid Hudaires Al-Shammari
- (Sri Lanka) Palitha Parakkrama Hemathunga
- (Sri Lanka) Iran Udayankantha
- (Sri Lanka) Sanjeewa Premalal
- (Sri Lanka) Pathmasiri Dias
- (Sri Lanka) Mohamed Ashad

== Group stage ==
The four teams competing against each other in the group stage in a single round-robin method. At the end of group matches, the top two teams advanced to the final and two teams were eliminated. Seychelles was first team who confirmed the final with a goalless draw in their third match against Maldives. On the other hand, both Bangladesh and Sri Lanka scored four points in three matches and their goal difference was equal but Sri Lanka advanced to the final as they scored more goals than Bangladesh.

=== Table ===
Pos	Team	Pld	W	D	L	GF	GA	GD	Pts	Qualification
1	Seychelles	3	1	2	0	2	1	+1	5	Advanced to Final
2	Sri Lanka (H)	3	1	1	1	6	6	0	4	Advanced to Final
3	Bangladesh	3	1	1	1	4	4	0	4	
4	Maldives	3	0	2	1	5	6	−1	2	

Source: boalha.mv
(H) Hosts

=== Matches ===
9 November 2021
15:30 SLST

Maldives	4–4	Sri Lanka
A. Ghanee 8'; A. Fasir 9'; I. Mahudhee 34'; Ali Ashfaq 58'	Report	W. Razeek 64', 68', 72', 90+2'

Racecourse Ground, Colombo
Attendance: 2,998
Referee: Mohammed Ahmed Al-Shammari (Qatar)

10 November 2021
15:30 SLST

Bangladesh	1–1	Seychelles
M.Ibrahim 17'	Report	Warren Mellie 88'

Racecourse Ground, Colombo
Attendance: 1,425
Referee: Kasun Lakmal Weerakkody (Sri Lanka)

13 November 2021
15:30 SLST

Bangladesh	2–1	Maldives
J. Bhuyan 12'; T. Barman 86' (pen.)	Report	A. Ibrahim 33'

Racecourse Ground, Colombo
Attendance: 975
Referee: Hettikamkanamge Perera (Sri Lanka)
13 November 2021
20:30 SLST

Seychelles	1–0	Sri Lanka
Warren Mellie 68'	Report

Racecourse Ground, Colombo
Attendance: 2,775
Referee: Abdulhadi Al Asmar Al Ruaile (Qatar)

16 November 2021
15:30 SLST

Maldives	0–0	Seychelles
	Report

Racecourse Ground, Colombo
Attendance: 755
Referee: Nivon Robesh (Sri Lanka)
16 November 2021
20:30 SLST

Sri Lanka	2–1	Bangladesh
W. Razeek 25', 90' (pen.)	Report	J. Rana 71'

Racecourse Ground, Colombo
Attendance: 1,250
Referee: Mohammed Ahmed Al-Shammari (Qatar)

== Final ==
19 November 2021
19:00 SLST

Sri Lanka	3–3 (a.e.t.)	Seychelles
Hamilton 4'; Aakib 57'; Razeek 75' (pen.)	Report	Jean 45+1'; Rathnayake 85' (o.g.); Tamboo 90'
Penalties
Hamilton (penalty missed); Rahuman (penalty missed); Perera (penalty scored); Rathnayake (penalty missed)	1–3	(penalty missed) Fanchette; (penalty scored) Tamboo; (penalty scored) Jean; (penalty scored) Ernesta

Racecourse Ground, Colombo
Attendance: 4,550
Referee: Mohammed Ahmed Al-Shammari (Qatar)

== Statistics ==
=== Goalscorers ===
There have been 23 goals scored in 7 matches, for an average of 3.29 goals per match.

7 goals

- (Sri Lanka) Ahmed Waseem Razeek

1 goal

- (Bangladesh) Topu Barman
- (Bangladesh) Jamal Bhuyan
- (Bangladesh) Mohammad Ibrahim
- (Bangladesh) Jewel Rana
- (Maldives) Akram Abdul Ghanee
- (Maldives) Ali Fasir
- (Maldives) Ibrahim Mahudhee
- (Maldives) Ali Ashfaq
- (Maldives) Aisam Ibrahim
- (Seychelles) Elijah Tamboo
- (Seychelles) Hubert Jean
- (Seychelles) Brandon Labrosse
- (Seychelles) Warren Mellie
- (Sri Lanka) Mohamed Aakib
- (Sri Lanka) Marvin Hamilton

1 own goal

- (Sri Lanka) Charitha Rathnayake (against Seychelles)
