= Brandon Labrosse =

Seychellois footballer

Personal information
- Date of birth: 11 March 1999 (age 27)
- Position: Forward

Team information
- Current team: Foresters Mont Fleuri

Senior career*
Years	Team	Apps	(Gls)
2018–	Foresters Mont Fleuri	52	(26)

International career^{‡}
2019–	Seychelles	38	(5)
- * Club domestic league appearances and goals ‡ National team caps and goals as of 29 April 2026 (UTC)

Brandon Labrosse (born 11 March 1999) is a Seychellois international footballer who plays as a forward for Seychelles First Division club Foresters Mont Fleuri.

== International goals ==
No.	Date	Venue	Opponent	Score	Result	Competition
1	10 November 2021	Racecourse Stadium, Colombo, Sri Lanka	Bangladesh	1–1	1–1	2021 Four Nations Football Tournament
2	11 July 2023	Princess Magogo Stadium, KwaMashu, South Africa	Zambia	1–4	2–4	2023 COSAFA Cup
3	1 July 2024	Isaac Wolfson Stadium, Gqeberha, South Africa	Angola	2–1	2–3	2024 COSAFA Cup
4	3 July 2024	Isaac Wolfson Stadium, Gqeberha, South Africa	Namibia	1–3	1–3	2024 COSAFA Cup
5	29 March 2026	Free State Stadium, Bloemfontein, South Africa	Lesotho	1–0	1–2	2027 Africa Cup of Nations qualification
Last updated 29 March 2026
