= Seychelles national football team =

Men's association football team

Seychelles
- Nickname: The Pirates
- Association: Seychelles Football Federation (SFF)
- Confederation: CAF (Africa)
- Sub-confederation: COSAFA (Southern Africa)
- Head coach: N/A
- Captain: Charmaine Häusl
- Most caps: Benoit Marie (64)
- Top scorer: Philip Zialor (14)
- Home stadium: Stade Linité
- FIFA code: SEY
First colours	Second colours	Third colours

FIFA ranking
- Current: 205 ▼1 (7 October 2026)
- Highest: 129 (October 2006)
- Lowest: 204 (April 2026 – June 2026)

First international
- Réunion 2–0 Seychelles (Saint-Denis, Réunion; 13 February 1974)

Biggest win
- Seychelles 9–0 Maldives (Saint-Pierre, Réunion; 27 August 1979)

Biggest defeat
- Ivory Coast 9–0 Seychelles (Abidjan, Côte d'Ivoire; 17 November 2023)

COSAFA Cup
- Appearances: 14 (first in 2005)
- Best result: Group stage (2005, 2006, 2007, 2008, 2009, 2013, 2015, 2016, 2017, 2018, 2019, 2022, 2023, 2024)
Medal record
Men's football
Indian Ocean Island Games
Gold medal – first place	2011 Seychelles
Silver medal – second place	1979 Reunion
Bronze medal – third place	1990 Madagascar
Bronze medal – third place	1998 Reunion
Bronze medal – third place	2003 Mauritius

The Seychelles national football team, nicknamed the Pirates, represents Seychelles in international football and is controlled by the Seychelles Football Federation (SFF). SFF has been a member of the Confederation of African Football (CAF) and FIFA since 1986. The team's home stadium is the 10,000-capacity Stade Linité located in Roche Caiman in the outskirts of Victoria, the capital of Seychelles.

== History ==
Football was introduced to Seychelles in the 1930s. Its first official competition, the Challenge Cup, was organized in 1936. Then in 1941, a championship between five teams was set up with matches of 60 minutes, played barefoot.

In 1969, the president of the Seychelles Football Federation wanted to set up a national team. Engaged on a voluntary basis, Adrian Fisher arrived on the island in September to reorganize Seychelles football. He equipped all the players with shoes, introduced contemporary training techniques and extended the match time to 90 minutes. The newly-formed national team played their first matches at a friendly tournament in Kenya in April 1970. In Seychelles' first matches played on a real football pitch, they drew 2–2 against Feisal F.C. then lost 1–2 to Mwengi at Mombasa Municipal Stadium. When Fisher left Seychelles in 1973, the team had played six games against four clubs.

Seychelles played their first match against another national team on March 13, 1974, against Réunion. In this friendly match, the Pirates lost 0–2. Two years later, this time as an independent nation, the Seychelles faced Réunion again, losing 1–4. In September 1977, they played their first match against a FIFA-affiliated team, Mauritius, during a tournament played in Réunion, and lost 1–2. The team enjoyed its first victory the following year by beating Réunion 1–0 at home.

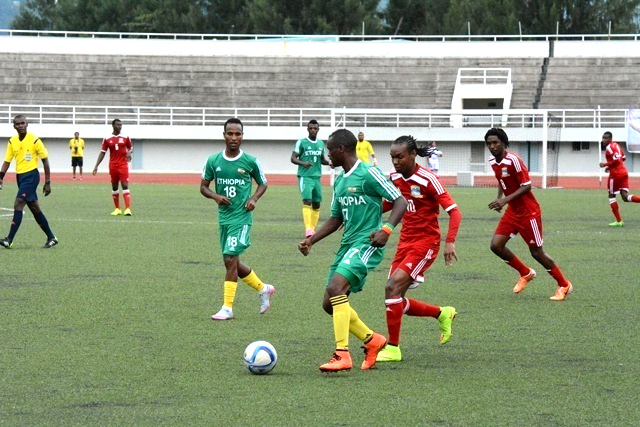
Seychelles v Ethiopia at Stade Linité, 5 September 2015

In 1979, Seychelles played their first tournament, the 1979 Indian Ocean Games. They lost their first game 3–0 to Réunion, and beat Maldives 9–0 in their second. In the semi-final, they knocked out Mauritius 4–2 on penalties after a 1–1 draw, but in the final they lost 2–1 to Réunion.

Seychelles were eliminated from the group stage at the 1985 Indian Ocean Games but, on August 31, 1986, they played their first competitive match recognised by FIFA and CAF, following their affiliation with both organisations, a qualification match against Mauritius for the 1987 All-Africa Games, which they lost 1–2. They participated, for the first time, in the 1988 African Cup of Nations qualifiers against Mauritius but lost 1–3 over the two legs.

At the 1990 Indian Ocean Games, the team suffered the heaviest defeat in its history against Madagascar in the semi-final, losing 0–6. In the bronze medal match, they won against Comoros 3–1. Despite hosting the following games, the team failed to repeat this performance, losing all four games and finishing last in the competition.

After the elimination from the preliminary phase of the 1996 African Cup of Nations by Mauritius 2–1 over the two legs, Vojo Gardašević was hired to lead the team. Following that, the Pirates again finished third in the 1998 Indian Ocean Games and, two years later, competed in the World Cup qualifiers for the first time. Playing against Namibia they drew 1–1 in Stade Linité, thanks to a goal by Philip Zialor but lost the second leg 0–3. Seychelles were also eliminated in the preliminary round of the 2000 African Cup of Nations by Zimbabwe 0–6 over the two matches. Seychelles fared better in the qualification for the 2004 African Cup of Nations as the team, led by Dominique Bathenay then Michael Nees, finished third and recorded two prestigious home wins: beating Eritrea 1–0 with a goal by veteran Roddy Victor, and beating a Peter Ndlovu-led Zimbabwe team 2–1 with goals by strikers Alpha Baldé and Philip Zialor. Following that they achieved a bronze medal at the 2003 Indian Ocean Games, then were eliminated in the preliminary round of the 2006 World Cup by Zambia, 1–5 in the two games.

In 2011, Seychelles hosted the 2011 Indian Ocean Island Games and won the tournament for the first time, beating Mauritius in the final on penalties.

The rest of the 2010s saw little success for The Pirates with the high point achieved during 2017 Africa Cup of Nations qualification where they managed a 2–0 win over Lesotho and a 1–1 draw with Ethiopia to finish third in their four-team group.

== FIFA Goal programme ==
In 2006, a new technical centre in Mahé was opened, with help from the FIFA Goal programme. The project had a total cost of approximately 750,000 USD. James Michel, president of the Seychelles, was present at the inauguration. The technical centre houses the SFF headquarters, an auditorium, 20 bedrooms, two massage rooms, changing rooms and a restaurant. The centre is located next to the turf pitches that were also installed by the Goal programme in 2003.

== Results and fixtures ==
The following is a list of match results in the last 12 months, as well as any future matches that have been scheduled.

Win Draw Loss Fixture

=== 2026 ===
26 March 2026 2027 Africa Cup of Nations qualification	Seychelles	0–0	Lesotho	Bloemfontein South Africa
16:00 UTC+2		Report		Stadium: Toyota Stadium; Referee: William Oloya (Uganda)

29 March 2026 2027 Africa Cup of Nations qualification	Lesotho	2–1	Seychelles	Bloemfontein, South Africa
17:00 UTC+2	Lesako 50'; Motebang 82'	Report	Labrosse 45+2'	Stadium: Toyota Stadium; Referee: Gerson Esono (Equatorial Guinea)

27 September Friendly	Seychelles	0–3	Sri Lanka	Victoria, Seychelles
16:00 4:00		Report	Rajamohan 45+2' (pen.), 52'; De Silva 76'	Stadium: Stade Linité; Referee: Hery Tiana Andriananivoarison (Madagascar)

30 September Friendly	Seychelles	0–2	Sri Lanka	Victoria, Seychelles
17:00 4:00		Report	De Silva 32'; Razeek 84'	Stadium: Stade Linité; Referee: Hery Tiana Andriananivoarison (Madagascar)

== Coaching staff ==
Position	Name
Head coach	N/A
Assistant Coaches	(Seychelles) Ernest Vivien (Seychelles) Lesley Guichard
Goalkeeping Coach	(Seychelles) Frantz Boulle
Fitness Coach	(Seychelles) James Fontaine
Match Analyst	(Seychelles) Alexis Lafleur
Doctors	(Seychelles) Dr. Daniel François (Seychelles) Dr. Justine Valmont
Physiotherapists	(Seychelles) Michael Payet (Seychelles) Jules Hervé (Seychelles) Richard Lemoine (Seychelles) Thomas Hoareau
Team Coordinator	(Seychelles) Gavin Jeanne
Technical Director	(Seychelles) Vivian Bothe

=== Coaching history ===
Caretaker managers are listed in italics.

- (England) Adrian Fisher (1969–1973)
- (Seychelles) Ulrich Mathiot (1991)
- (Germany) Helmut Kosmehl (1992–1993)
- (Federal Republic of Yugoslavia) Vojo Gardašević (1997–2001)
- (France) Dominique Bathenay (2002)
- (Germany) Michael Nees (2002–2004)
- (Democratic Republic of the Congo) Raoul Shungu (2006–2008)
- (Netherlands) Jan Mak (2008)
- (Seychelles) Ulrich Mathiot (2008)
- (Sweden) Richard Holmlund (2009)
- (Netherlands) Jan Mak (2010)
- (Germany) Michael Nees (2010)
- (England) Andrew Amers-Morrison (2010)
- (Seychelles) Ralph Jean-Louis (2010–2011)
- (Seychelles) Gavin Jeanne (2012)
- (Netherlands) Jan Mak (2013–2014)
- (Seychelles) Ulrich Mathiot (2014–2015)
- (Madagascar) Bruno Saindini (2015)
- (Seychelles) Ralph Jean-Louis (2015–2016)
- (Seychelles) Joel de Commarmond (2017)
- (Seychelles) Rodney Choisy (2017)
- (Seychelles) Gavin Jeanne (2018–2019)
- (Netherlands) Jan Mak (2019)
- (Seychelles) Ralph Jean-Louis (2020–2021)
- (France) Osama Haroun (2021)
- (Seychelles) Vivian Bothe (2021–2023)
- (Seychelles) Ralph Jean-Louis (2023–2026)

== Players ==
=== Current squad ===
The following players were selected for the 2026 FIFA World Cup qualification – CAF Group F matches against Gabon and Kenya on 3 and 9 September 2025.

Caps and goals correct as of 25 March 2025, after the match against Burundi.

No.	Pos.	Player	Date of birth (age)	Caps	Goals	Club
1	GK	Carlos Simeon	29 October 1998 (age 27)	5	0	(Seychelles Football Federation) Anse Réunion
18	GK	Romeo Padayachy	18 February 1993 (age 33)	4	0	(Seychelles Football Federation) Light Stars
22	GK	Ian Ah-Kong	2 November 1995 (age 30)	19	0	(Seychelles Football Federation) Anse Réunion
2	DF	Justin Riaze	14 November 2002 (age 23)	1	0	(Seychelles Football Federation) Saint Louis Suns United
3	DF	Makhan Bristol-Cissoko	26 June 2006 (age 20)	8	0	(Seychelles Football Federation) Foresters Mont Fleuri
4	DF	Alfie Walters	1 September 2002 (age 24)	2	0	(The Football Association) Metropolitan Police
5	DF	Don Fanchette	3 December 1997 (age 28)	31	0	(Seychelles Football Federation) La Passe
12	DF	Warren Mellie	1 October 1994 (age 32)	40	3	(Seychelles Football Federation) Foresters Mont Fleuri
19	DF	Markus Payet	13 June 2005 (age 21)	9	0	(Seychelles Football Federation) La Passe
8	MF	Lorenzo Hoareau	1 June 2007 (age 19)	9	3	(Seychelles Football Federation) Anse Réunion
10	MF	Dean Mothe	1 August 2000 (age 26)	25	0	(Seychelles Football Federation) Saint Louis Suns United
14	MF	Anil Dijoux	20 July 2006 (age 20)	4	0	(Seychelles Football Federation) Anse Réunion
16	MF	Josip Ravignia	19 January 2001 (age 25)	20	0	(Seychelles Football Federation) St Michel United
17	MF	Ryan Henriette	23 January 2001 (age 25)	22	2	(Seychelles Football Federation) Anse Réunion
20	MF	Imra Raheriniaina	19 November 2004 (age 21)	11	0	(Seychelles Football Federation) Saint Louis Suns United
21	MF	Vince Fred	16 October 2005 (age 21)	4	0	(Seychelles Football Federation) Light Stars
23	MF	Elie Sopha	3 November 2004 (age 21)	12	0	(Seychelles Football Federation) St Michel United
6	FW	Anelka Adela	28 November 2006 (age 19)	0	0	(Seychelles Football Federation) Bel Air
7	FW	Brandon Labrosse	11 March 1999 (age 27)	32	4	(Seychelles Football Federation) Foresters Mont Fleuri
9	FW	Jerone Joubert	28 November 2003 (age 22)	2	0	(Seychelles Football Federation) Light Stars
11	FW	Tyrone Cadeau	14 June 2004 (age 22)	7	0	(Football Association of Wales) Briton Ferry Llansawel
13	FW	Samuel Okolie	22 March 2008 (age 18)	3	0	(The Football Association) Bishop's Stortford
15	FW	Torry Radegonde	11 January 2003 (age 23)	0	0	(Seychelles Football Federation) La Passe

== Player records ==
As of 10 October 2025
Players in bold are still active with Seychelles.

=== Most appearances ===
Rank	Name	Caps	Goals	Career
1	**Benoit Marie**	64	0	2013–present
2	**Gervais Waye-Hive**	51	6	2012–present
3	Colin Esther	45	2	2008–2022
4	Eric Nelson Sopha	44	0	1996–2012
5	Jones Joubert	43	0	2006–2019
5	**Warren Mellie**	43	3	2017–present
7	Achille Henriette	39	6	2006–2016
8	**Brandon Labrosse**	35	4	2017–present
9	Henny Dufresne	33	1	2002–2014
9	Philip Zialor	33	14	1998–2009

=== Top goalscorers ===
Rank	Name	Goals	Caps	Ratio	Career
1	Philip Zialor	14	33	0.42	1998–2009
2	Alpha Baldé	6	20	0.3	1996–2011
2	Achille Henriette	6	39	0.15	2006–2016
2	**Gervais Waye-Hive**	6	51	0.12	2012–present
5	Perry Monnaie	4	17	0.24	2018–2020
5	Don Annacoura	4	27	0.15	2000–2011
5	**Brandon Labrosse**	4	35	0.11	2019–present
8	Ralph Jean-Louis	3	10	0.3	1993–2000
8	**Lorenzo Hoareau**	3	12	0.25	2021–present
8	Wilnes Brutus	3	12	0.25	2002–2011
8	Leroy Coralie	3	17	0.18	2016–2022
8	Yelvanny Rose	3	18	0.17	2002–2007
8	Nelson Laurence	3	25	0.12	2008–2018
8	Godfrey Denis Armel	3	29	0.1	1998–2008
8	**Warren Mellie**	3	43	0.07	2017–present

== Competition records ==
=== FIFA World Cup ===
FIFA World Cup									Qualification					
Year	Round	Position	Pld	W	D*	L	GF	GA	Pld	W	D	L	GF	GA
1930 to 1974	Part of United Kingdom								Part of United Kingdom					
1978 to 1986	Not a FIFA member								Not a FIFA member					
1990 to 1998	Did not enter								Did not enter					
(South Korea) (Japan) 2002	Did not qualify								2	0	1	1	1	4
(Germany) 2006	Did not qualify								2	0	1	1	1	5
(South Africa) 2010	Did not qualify								6	0	0	6	4	17
(Brazil) 2014	Did not qualify								2	0	0	2	0	7
(Russia) 2018	Did not qualify								2	0	0	2	0	3
(Qatar) 2022	Did not qualify								2	0	0	2	0	10
(Canada) (Mexico) (United States) 2026	Did not qualify								10	0	0	10	2	53
(Morocco) (Portugal) (Spain) 2030	To be determined								To be determined					
(Saudi Arabia) 2034	To be determined								To be determined					
Total	–	0/9	–	–	–	–	–	–	26	0	2	24	8	99

=== Africa Cup of Nations ===
Africa Cup of Nations record									Africa Cup of Nations Qualification record					
Year	Round	Position	Pld	W	D*	L	GF	GA	Pld	W	D	L	GF	GA
(Sudan) 1957 to (Ethiopia) 1976	Part of United Kingdom								Part of United Kingdom					
(Ghana) 1978 to (Egypt) 1986	Not affiliated to CAF								Not affiliated to CAF					
(Morocco) 1988	Did not enter								Did not enter					
(Algeria) 1990	Did not qualify								2	1	0	1	1	3
(Senegal) 1992	Withdrew								Withdrew					
(Tunisia) 1994	Did not enter								Did not enter					
(South Africa) 1996	Withdrew								Withdrew					
(Burkina Faso) 1998	Did not qualify								2	0	1	1	1	2
(Ghana) (Nigeria) 2000	Did not enter								Did not enter					
(Mali) 2002	Did not enter								Did not enter					
(Tunisia) 2004	Did not qualify								6	2	0	4	4	10
(Egypt) 2006	Did not qualify								2	0	1	1	1	5
(Ghana) 2008	Did not qualify								6	1	1	4	3	14
(Angola) 2010	Did not qualify								6	0	0	6	4	17
(Equatorial Guinea) (Gabon) 2012	Did not enter								Did not enter					
(South Africa) 2013	Did not qualify								2	0	0	2	0	7
(Equatorial Guinea) 2015	Withdrew								Withdrew					
(Gabon) 2017	Did not qualify								6	1	1	4	5	11
(Egypt) 2019	Did not qualify								6	0	1	5	3	25
(Cameroon) 2021	Did not qualify								2	0	0	2	1	3
(Ivory Coast) 2023	Did not qualify								2	0	1	1	1	3
(Morocco) 2025	Excluded								Excluded					
(Kenya) (Tanzania) (Uganda) 2027	Did not qualify								2	0	1	1	1	2
2029	To be determined								To be determined					
Total	–	0/35	–	–	–	–	–	–	42	5	6	31	24	100

=== Indian Ocean Island Games ===
Indian Ocean Island Games record
Year	Round	Position	Pld	W	D*	L	GF	GA
(Réunion) 1979	Runners-up	2nd	4	1	1	2	11	6
(Mauritius) 1985	Group stage	6th	2	0	0	2	1	4
(Madagascar) 1990	Third place	3rd	3	1	0	2	3	9
(Seychelles) 1993	Fourth place	4th	4	0	0	4	3	12
(Réunion) 1998	Third place	3rd	4	2	0	2	9	10
(Mauritius) 2003	Third place	3rd	4	1	2	1	3	6
(Madagascar) 2007	Group stage	5th	2	1	0	1	2	4
(Seychelles) 2011	Champions	1st	5	3	2	0	10	4
(Réunion) 2015	Group stage	5th	3	1	0	2	4	3
(Mauritius) 2019	Fourth place	4th	4	0	2	2	2	8
(Madagascar) 2023	Group Stage	6th	2	0	0	2	0	2
Total	1 Title	11/11	36	10	7	20	48	68

=== COSAFA Cup ===
Year	COSAFA Cup							
Year	Round	Result	M	W	D	L	GF	GA
2000	Excluded							
2001	Excluded							
2002	Did not enter							
2003	Did not enter							
2004	Did not enter							
2005	Round 1	11th	1	0	0	1	0	3
2006	Round 1	7th	2	0	1	1	1	3
2007	Round 1	13th	2	0	0	2	0	7
(South Africa) 2008	Group stage	11th	3	1	1	1	8	2
(Zimbabwe) 2009	Group stage	13th	3	0	0	3	2	6
(Zambia) 2013	Group stage	13th	2	0	0	2	2	8
(South Africa) 2015	Group stage	13th	3	0	1	2	0	2
(Namibia) 2016	Group stage	14th	3	0	0	3	0	10
(South Africa) 2017	Group stage	14th	3	0	0	3	1	10
(South Africa) 2018	Group stage	12th	3	0	2	1	2	3
(South Africa) 2019	Group stage	13th	3	0	1	2	0	6
(South Africa) 2021	Did not enter							
(South Africa) 2022	Group Stage	13th	3	0	0	3	1	6
(South Africa) 2023	Group Stage	12th	3	0	0	3	2	9
Total	Group stage	11/19	34	1	6	27	19	75

== Head-to-head record ==
As of 30 September 2026

=== FIFA members ===
Opponent	Pld	W	D	L	GF	GA	GD
Algeria	2	0	0	2	0	6	–6
Angola	2	0	0	2	2	6	–4
Bangladesh	3	1	1	1	2	2	0
Botswana	2	0	0	2	0	3	–3
Burkina Faso	2	0	0	2	3	7	–4
Burundi	7	0	0	7	3	22	–19
Comoros	9	3	2	4	12	16	–4
Congo	1	0	1	0	1	1	0
DR Congo	2	0	0	2	0	7	–7
Eritrea	3	1	0	2	1	2	–1
Eswatini	4	0	1	3	1	7	–6
Ethiopia	2	0	1	1	2	3	–1
Gabon	2	0	0	2	0	7	–7
Gambia	2	0	0	2	1	12	–11
Ivory Coast	2	0	0	2	0	16	–16
Kenya	7	0	1	6	2	26	–24
Lesotho	8	1	3	4	7	10	–3
Libya	2	0	0	2	2	13	–11
Madagascar	13	0	4	9	6	28	–22
Malawi	2	0	0	2	0	5	–5
Maldives	8	4	1	3	21	10	+11
Mali	2	0	0	2	0	5	–5
Mauritius	31	6	8	17	32	51	–19
Mozambique	4	0	1	3	2	6	–4
Namibia	7	0	3	4	5	15	–10
Nigeria	2	0	0	2	1	6	–5
Palestine	1	0	0	1	0	1	–1
Rwanda	2	0	0	2	0	10	–10
San Marino	1	0	1	0	0	0	0
Sierra Leone	1	0	0	1	0	2	–2
South Africa	3	0	1	2	0	9	–9
South Sudan	2	0	0	2	1	3	–2
Sri Lanka	6	2	1	3	8	10	–2
Sudan	2	0	0	2	0	5	–5
Tanzania	2	1	1	0	3	2	+1
Tunisia	4	0	0	4	0	14	–14
Uganda	3	0	0	3	2	8	–6
Zambia	4	0	1	3	3	11	–8
Zimbabwe	7	1	0	6	3	22	–19
Total	170	20	32	117	126	389	–263

=== Non FIFA members ===
Opponent	Pld	W	D	L	GF	GA	GD
Mayotte	3	1	0	2	3	5	–2
Réunion	16	2	1	13	9	33	–24
Total	19	3	1	15	12	38	–26

== Honours ==
=== Regional ===
- Indian Ocean Island Games
  - (gold) Gold medal (1): 2011
  - (silver) Silver medal (1): 1979
  - (bronze) Bronze medal (3): 1990, 1998, 2003

=== Friendly ===
- Four Nations Football Tournament (1): 2021
