= 2011 Seychelles First Division =

Seychelles First Division
- Season: 2011
- Champions: St Michel United FC
- Matches: 90
- Goals: 311 (3.46 per match)

The 2011 Seychelles First Division (also known as the 2011 Barclays First Division) is the highest competitive football league in the Seychelles, which was founded in 1979. It began on 24 February 2011.

St Michel United FC retained the title, their 10th championship win in 16 years. The Lions were relegated.

== Teams ==
Due to the increase of teams from 8 to 10, Northern Dynamo who finished in 7th place in 2010 did not play a relegation playoff game, instead they stayed in the First Division. However the 8th placed team St Roch United had a playoff game against Second Division side St John Bosco. The game ended 4–2 in favour of St Roch after extra time, therefore St Roch stayed in the First Division. Second Division winners and runners-up Côte d’Or and The Lions respectively, were promoted. Having received sponsorship from Sligo Rovers F.C. in June 2011 many of the teams in Seychelles have benefited from the advent of modern sports grounds which allow the players access to modern facilities such as showers and pitches.

Team	City	Stadium
Anse Réunion	Anse Réunion	La Digue
Côte d'Or	Praslin	Baie Ste Anne
La Passe	La Passe	La Digue
LightStars	Grand'Anse	Baie Ste Anne
Northern Dynamo	Glacis	Stade Linité
St Francis	Baie Lazare	Stade Linité
St Louis Suns United	Victoria	Stade Linité
St Michel United	Anse-aux-Pins	Stade Linité
St Roch United	Bel Ombre	Stade Linité
The Lions FC	Cascade	Stade Linité

== League table ==
Pos	Team	Pld	W	D	L	GF	GA	GD	Pts	Qualification or relegation
1	St Michel United	18	13	4	1	42	11	+31	43	
2	La Passe	18	12	4	2	44	17	+27	40	
3	Côte d'Or	18	10	3	5	29	14	+15	33	
4	Anse Réunion	18	8	2	8	37	33	+4	26	
5	LightStars	18	6	5	7	36	39	−3	23	
6	Northern Dynamo	18	6	4	8	19	29	−10	22	
7	St Francis	18	6	3	9	28	37	−9	21	
8	St Louis Suns United	18	5	2	11	20	26	−6	17	
9	St Roch United	18	4	4	10	34	57	−23	16	Qualification for Relegation play-off
10	The Lions FC	18	4	1	13	22	48	−26	13	Relegation to second level

Updated to match(es) played on 8 November 2011. Source: FIFA.com
Rules for classification: 1) points; 2) goal difference; 3) number of goals scored.

== Results ==
Home \ Away	ANS	COT	LPA	LST	NOR	STF	STL	STM	STR	TLI
Anse Réunion		1–2	2–0	2–1	4–3	3–0	2–2	0–2	8–2	1–3
Côte d'Or	0–1		1–1	1–0	1–1	3–1	2–1	0–1	9–0	2–0
La Passe	2–0	2–1		5–1	0–0	2–0	2–0	2–2	2–0	5–1
LightStars	3–1	2–2	2–2		1–0	2–3	1–0	1–1	2–2	2–3
Northern Dynamo	2–0	1–2	0–4	0–2		2–2	0–0	0–6	3–2	2–0
St Francis	0–0	0–1	0–2	5–7	0–2		3–0	0–3	4–4	2–1
St Louis Suns United	2–1	0–1	1–2	4–1	2–0	1–2		1–0	1–3	3–0
St Michel United	4–2	1–0	3–1	1–0	2–0	2–0	2–1		6–1	5–1
St Roch United	2–5	1–0	3–4	5–5	0–1	1–3	2–0	0–0		1–2
The Lions FC	2–4	0–1	0–6	2–3	2–1	1–2	2–1	1–1	2–5	

Updated to match(es) played on 8 November 2011. Source: Soccerway
Legend: Blue = home team win; Yellow = draw; Red = away team win.

== Relegation play-off ==
12 November 2011

St Roch United	2 – 1	Super Magic Brothers
	Report

Stade Linité, Victoria

== Top scorers ==
Rank	Scorer	Team	Goals
1	(Seychelles) Yelvanny Rose	La Passe	7
2	(Seychelles) Andrew Jean	LightStars	6
2	(Madagascar) Fulgence Rajaoniary	St Michel United	6
2	(Madagascar) Valery Rakotoarinosy	La Passe	6
5	(Seychelles) Marcus Maria	Northern Dynamo	5

== President’s Cup ==
Prior to the 2011 Seychelles First Division, the President's Cup was played between the 2010 league winners, St Michel United and the 2010 Land Marine Cup winners St Louis Suns United.

19 February 2011
16:30

St Louis Suns United	2 – 3	St Michel United
Poiret 33' (?)		Hall 46'; Nourrice 54'; Dufresne 80'

Stade Linité, Victoria
