= 2021–22 CAF Confederation Cup qualifying rounds =

- Dates: 10 September – 6 February 2022

Tournament statistics
- Matches played: 94
- Goals scored: 186 (1.98 per match)

The 2021–22 CAF Confederation Cup qualifying rounds were played from 10 September to 6 February 2022. A total of 51 teams competed in the international football qualifying rounds to decide the 16 places in the group stage of the 2021–22 CAF Confederation Cup.

Times are in local times.

== Draw ==
The draw for the qualifying rounds was held on 13 August 2021 at the CAF headquarters in Cairo, Egypt.

The entry round of the 51 teams entered into the draw was determined by their performances in the CAF competitions for the previous five seasons (CAF 5-year ranking points shown in parentheses).

| Entry round | Second round (13 teams) | First round (38 teams) |
|---|---|---|
| Teams | (Morocco) RS Berkane (41 pts); (Egypt) Pyramids (31 pts); (Algeria) JS Kabylie (28 pts); (Democratic Republic of the Congo) AS Vita Club (26 pts); (Nigeria) Enyimba (24 pts); (Tunisia) CS Sfaxien (21 pts); (Angola) Primeiro de Agosto (16 pts); (Cameroon) Coton Sport (16 pts); (South Africa) Orlando Pirates (16 pts); (Egypt) Al Masry (14 pts); (Kenya) Gor Mahia (8 pts); (Algeria) JS Saoura (6 pts); (Democratic Republic of the Congo) DC Motema Pembe (4 pts) | (Libya) Al Ahli Tripoli (3 pts); (Ivory Coast) FC San Pédro (2 pts); (Angola) Interclube; (Benin) Les Buffles du Borgou; (Botswana) Orapa United; (Burkina Faso) ASFA Yennenga; (Burundi) Bumamuru; (Comoros) Olympique de Missiri; (Republic of the Congo) CSMD Diables Noirs; (Djibouti) FC Dikhil; (Equatorial Guinea) Futuro Kings; (Eswatini) Young Buffaloes; (Ethiopia) Ethiopian Coffee; (Gabon) AS Mangasport; (Guinea) AS Ashanti Golden Boys; (Guinea) Wakriya AC; (Liberia) MC Breweries; (Madagascar) CFFA; (Mali) Binga FC; (Mauritania) ASAC Concorde; (Morocco) AS FAR; (Nigeria) Bayelsa United; (Niger) AS Police; (Rwanda) AS Kigali; (Senegal) Diambars FC; (Somalia) Horseed; (South Africa) Marumo Gallants; (South Sudan) Atlabara; (Sudan) Al-Ahli Merowe; (Sudan) Hay Al-Wadi; (Tanzania) Azam; (Tanzania) Biashara United; (Togo) ASC Kara; (Tunisia) US Ben Guerdane; (Uganda) URA Football Club; (Zambia) Red Arrows; (Zambia) Kabwe Warriors; (Zanzibar) Mafunzo |

== Format ==
In the qualifying rounds, each tie was played on a home-and-away two-legged basis. If the aggregate score was tied after the second leg, the away goals rule was applied, and if still tied, extra time won't be played, and the penalty shoot-out was used to determine the winner (Regulations III. 13 & 14).

== Schedule ==
The schedule of the competition was as follows.

| Round | First leg | Second leg |
|---|---|---|
| First round | 10–12 September 2021 | 17–19 September 2021 |
| Second round | 15–17 October 2021 | 22–24 October 2021 |
| Play-off round | 28 November 2021 | 5 December 2021 |

== First round ==
| Team 1 | Agg. | Team 2 | 1st leg | 2nd leg |
|---|---|---|---|---|
| US Ben Guerdane (Tunisia) | 3–2 | (Niger) AS Police | 3–1 | 0–1 |
| AS FAR (Morocco) | 3–1 | (Benin) Les Buffles du Borgou | 3–1 | 0–0 |
| Diambars FC (Senegal) | 3–0 (Note: Matches involving Guinean clubs were played over a single leg in their opponent's country due to the political and security situation in Guinea following a coup d'état.) | (Guinea) Wakriya AC | | |
| AS Ashanti Golden Boys (Guinea) | 2–4 | (Nigeria) Bayelsa United | | |
| ASC Kara (Togo) | 3–4 | (Mauritania) ASAC Concorde | 3–0 | 0–4 |
| Azam (Tanzania) | 4–1 | (Somalia) Horseed | 3–1 | 1–0 |
| URA Football Club (Uganda) | 5–2 | (Ethiopia) Ethiopian Coffee | 2–1 | 3–1 |
| Atlabara (South Sudan) | 0–4 | (Sudan) Al-Ahli Merowe | 0–2 | 0–2 |
| Futuro Kings (Equatorial Guinea) | 2–4 | (South Africa) Marumo Gallants | 2–1 | 0–3 |
| AS Mangasport (Gabon) | 0–0 (2–3 p) | (Botswana) Orapa United | 0–0 | 0–0 |
| Bumamuru (Burundi) | 0–1 | (Republic of the Congo) CSMD Diables Noirs | 0–0 | 0–1 |
| Red Arrows (Zambia) | 2–1 | (Eswatini) Young Buffaloes | 2–1 | 0–0 |
| Olympique de Missiri (Comoros) | 1–8 | (Rwanda) AS Kigali | 1–2 | 0–6 |
| Binga FC (Mali) | 5–0 | (Liberia) MC Breweries | 3–0 | 2–0 |
| ASFA Yennenga (Burkina Faso) | 2–1 | (Ivory Coast) FC San Pédro | 0–0 | 2–1 |
| FC Dikhil (Djibouti) | 0–3 | (Tanzania) Biashara United | 0–1 | 0–2 |
| Hay Al-Wadi SC (Sudan) | 0–4 (Note: The first leg was originally scheduled to be played on 12 September 2021 at El-Obeid Stadium, El-Obeid, but was cancelled due to concerns over the suitability of the venue. The match was played over a single leg at the venue for the second leg.) | (Libya) Al Ahli Tripoli | | |
| CFFA (Madagascar) | 2–1 | (Zambia) Kabwe Warriors | 0–0 | 2–1 |
| Mafunzo (Zanzibar) | 0–4 | (Angola) Interclube | 0–1 | 0–3 |

Notes:

12 September 2021
16:30 UTC+1

| US Ben Guerdane (Tunisia) | 3–1 | (Niger) AS Police |
|---|---|---|
| Ouji 12', 45'; Mhamdi 19' | Report | Kouazie 79' |

Stade du 7 Mars, Ben Guerdane
Referee: Abderrezzak Arab (Algeria)
18 September 2021
16:30 UTC+1

| AS Police (Niger) | 1–0 | (Tunisia) US Ben Guerdane |
|---|---|---|
| Atilola 26' | Report |

Stade Général Seyni Kountché, Niamey
Referee: Stanislas Ahomlanto (Benin)

US Ben Guerdane won 3–2 on aggregate.

12 September 2021
19:00 UTC+1

| AS FAR (Morocco) | 3–1 | (Benin) Les Buffles du Borgou |
|---|---|---|
| Fati 25'; Moujahid 26'; Tarkhatt 79' | Report | Béakou 50' |

Prince Moulay Abdellah Stadium, Rabat
Referee: Mohamed Adel (Egypt)
18 September 2021
14:00 UTC+1

| Les Buffles du Borgou (Benin) | 0–0 | (Morocco) AS FAR |
|---|---|---|
| | Report |

Stade de l'Amitié, Cotonou
Referee: Charles Bulu (Ghana)

AS FAR won 3–1 on aggregate.

12 September 2021 (Note: The preliminary round match between Diambars FC and Wakriya AC was played over a single leg, and not in the Guinean territory due to the political and security situation in Guinea following the 2021 Guinean coup d'état.)
17:00 UTC+0

| Diambars FC (Senegal) | 3–0 | (Guinea) Wakriya AC |
|---|---|---|
| Ngom 65' (pen.); Bodian 82'; Diaw 89' | Report |

Stade Lat-Dior, Thiès
Referee: Moussa Diou (Mauritania)

19 September 2021 (Note: The preliminary round match between AS Ashanti Golden Boys and Bayelsa United was played over a single leg, and not in the Guinean territory due to the political and security situation in Guinea following the 2021 Guinean coup d'état.)
16:00 UTC+1

| Bayelsa United (Nigeria) | 4–2 | (Guinea) AS Ashanti Golden Boys |
|---|---|---|
| Martins 6'; Inikurogha 31', 53'; James 37' | Report | Keita 50', 84' |

Yenagoa Township Stadium, Yenagoa
Referee: Yelebodom Bodjona (Togo)

12 September 2021
15:30 UTC+0

| ASC Kara (Togo) | 3–0 | (Mauritania) ASAC Concorde |
|---|---|---|
| Maman-Zougou 22'; Bodé 46'; Coulibaly 56' | Report |

Stade de Kégué, Lomé
Referee: Zakari Oumarou (Niger)
19 September 2021
17:00 UTC+0

| ASAC Concorde (Mauritania) | 4–0 | (Togo) ASC Kara |
|---|---|---|
| Habib 7'; Barry 54'; Bilal 83'; Thiam 90' | Report |

Stade Olympique de Nouakchott, Nouakchott
Referee: Swahib Bangura (Sierra Leone)

ASAC Concorde won 4–3 on aggregate.

11 September 2021
19:00 UTC+3

| Azam (Tanzania) | 3–1 | (Somalia) Horseed |
|---|---|---|
| Lyanga 32'; Mbombo 74'; Mwaikenda 78' | Report | Nor 23' |

Chamazi Stadium, Mbagala
Referee: Djaffari Nduwimana (Burundi)
18 September 2021
16:00 UTC+3

| Horseed (Somalia) | 0–1 | (Tanzania) Azam |
|---|---|---|
| | Report | Kader 38' |

Chamazi Stadium, Mbagala (Tanzania) (Note: Teams from Somalia played their home matches outside the country, since none of the stadiums met the quality standards set according to the CAF regulations.)
Referee: Ring Malong (South Sudan)

Azam won 4–1 on aggregate.

12 September 2021
16:00 UTC+3

| URA Football Club (Uganda) | 2–1 | (Ethiopia) Ethiopian Coffee |
|---|---|---|
| Mukwala 23', 36' | Report | Tesfay 54' |

St. Mary's Stadium-Kitende, Entebbe
Referee: Elly Sasii (Tanzania)
19 September 2021
15:00 UTC+3

| Ethiopian Coffee (Ethiopia) | 1–3 | (Uganda) URA Football Club |
|---|---|---|
| Tunjo 70' (pen.) | Report | Cromwell 41'; Mandela 52'; Kagimu 55' |

Bahir Dar Stadium, Bahir Dar
Referee: Philip Brooke (Kenya)

URA Football Club won 5–2 on aggregate.

11 September 2021
16:00 UTC+2

| Atlabara (South Sudan) | 0–2 | (Sudan) Al-Ahli Merowe |
|---|---|---|
| | Report | Abdulkarim 12' (o.g.); Gahdia 52' |

El-Obeid Stadium, El-Obeid (Sudan)
Referee: Lidya Tafesse (Ethiopia)
17 September 2021
16:00 UTC+2

| Al-Ahli Merowe (Sudan) | 2–0 | (South Sudan) Atlabara |
|---|---|---|
| Gahdia 44'; Kafi 87' | Report |

El-Obeid Stadium, El-Obeid
Referee: Tsegay Mogos Teklu (Eritrea)

Al-Ahli Merowe won 4–0 on aggregate.

11 September 2021
16:00 UTC+1

| Futuro Kings (Equatorial Guinea) | 2–1 | (South Africa) Marumo Gallants |
|---|---|---|
| Nlend 3' (pen.); Kata 54' | Report | Ndlondlo 13' |

Estadio de Mongomo, Mongomo
Referee: Jean-Piere Nguiene (Congo)
17 September 2021
15:00 UTC+2

| Marumo Gallants (South Africa) | 3–0 | (Equatorial Guinea) Futuro Kings |
|---|---|---|
| Ngema 27', 64'; Mnyamane 79' | Report |

Peter Mokaba Stadium, Polokwane
Referee: Mathews Hamalila (Zambia)

Marumo Gallants won 4–2 on aggregate.

12 September 2021
15:30 UTC+1

| AS Mangasport (Gabon) | 0–0 | (Botswana) Orapa United |
|---|---|---|
| | Report |

Stade Augustin Monédan de Sibang, Libreville
Referee: André Kolissala (Central African Republic)
18 September 2021
16:00 UTC+2

| Orapa United (Botswana) | 0–0 | (Gabon) AS Mangasport |
|---|---|---|
| | Report |
Penalties
| | 3–2 |

Botswana National Stadium, Gaborone
Referee: Eugene Mdluli (South Africa)

0–0 on aggregate. Orapa United won 3–2 on penalties.

10 September 2021
16:00 UTC+3

| Bumamuru (Burundi) | 0–0 | (Republic of the Congo) CSMD Diables Noirs |
|---|---|---|
| | Report |

Chamazi Stadium, Mbagala (Tanzania)
Referee: Ronald Madanda (Uganda)
18 September 2021
15:30 UTC+1

| CSMD Diables Noirs (Republic of the Congo) | 1–0 | (Burundi) Bumamuru |
|---|---|---|
| Nkolo 39' | Report |

Stade Alphonse Massemba-Débat, Brazzaville
Referee: Gauthier Mihindou (Gabon)

CSMD Diables Noirs won 1–0 on aggregate.

11 September 2021
15:00 UTC+2

| Red Arrows (Zambia) | 2–1 | (Eswatini) Young Buffaloes |
|---|---|---|
| Bulaya 28', 59' | Report | Gamedze 75' |

National Heroes Stadium, Lusaka
Referee: Gift Chicco (Malawi)
18 September 2021
15:00 UTC+2

| Young Buffaloes (Eswatini) | 0–0 | (Zambia) Red Arrows |
|---|---|---|
| | Report |

Mavuso Sports Centre, Manzini
Referee: Lebalang Mokete (Lesotho)

Red Arrows won 2–1 on aggregate.

10 September 2021
15:00 UTC+3

| Olympique de Missiri (Comoros) | 1–2 | (Rwanda) AS Kigali |
|---|---|---|
| El-Had 52' | Report | Kwizera 19'; Saba 28' |

Stade Omnisports de Malouzine, Moroni
Referee: Bamlak Tessema Weyesa (Ethiopia)
18 September 2021
15:00 UTC+2

| AS Kigali (Rwanda) | 6–0 | (Comoros) Olympique de Missiri |
|---|---|---|
| Kwizera 26'; Niyibizi 41'; Lawal 45'; Shabani 53'; Rukundo 60'; Biramahire 90+1' | Report |

Nyamirambo Regional Stadium, Kigali
Referee: Dickens Nyagrowa (Kenya)

AS Kigali won 8–1 on aggregate.

11 September 2021
16:30 UTC+0

| Binga FC (Mali) | 3–0 | (Liberia) MC Breweries |
|---|---|---|
| Diaby 15'; K. Coulibaly 50'; Y. Coulibaly 82' (pen.) | Report |

Stade Modibo Kéïta, Bamako
Referee: Bonifacio Julio da Silva (Guinea-Bissau)
19 September 2021
15:30 UTC+0

| MC Breweries (Liberia) | 0–2 | (Mali) Binga FC |
|---|---|---|
| | Report | Diallo 57'; Y. Coulibaly 80' (pen.) |

Samuel Kanyon Doe Sports Complex, Monrovia
Referee: Younoussa Camara (Guinea)

Binga FC won 5–0 on aggregate.

12 September 2021
16:00 UTC+1

| ASFA Yennenga (Burkina Faso) | 0–0 | (Ivory Coast) FC San Pédro |
|---|---|---|
| | Report |

Stade de Marrakech, Marrakesh (Morocco) (Note: Teams from Burkina Faso played their home matches outside the country, since none of the stadiums met the quality standards set according to the CAF regulations.)
Referee: Issa Mouhamed (Benin)
September 2021
14:15 UTC+0

| FC San Pédro (Ivory Coast) | 1–2 | (Burkina Faso) ASFA Yennenga |
|---|---|---|
| Bamba 64' | Report | Sawadogo 39'; Dagnon 81' |

Stade Robert Champroux, Abidjan
Referee: Abubakar Abdullahi (Nigeria)

ASFA Yennenga won 2–1 on aggregate.

10 September 2021
18:00 UTC+3

| FC Dikhil (Djibouti) | 0–1 | (Tanzania) Biashara United |
|---|---|---|
| | Report | Nkane 55' |

El Hadj Hassan Gouled Aptidon Stadium, Djibouti City
Referee: Ahmed Hussein (Somalia)
18 September 2021
16:00 UTC+3

| Biashara United (Tanzania) | 2–0 | (Djibouti) FC Dikhil |
|---|---|---|
| Chombo 20', 23' | Report |

Benjamin Mkapa National Stadium, Dar es Salaam
Referee: Yasir Ahmed Abdalaziz (Sudan)

Biashara United won 3–0 on aggregate.

19 September 2021 (Note: The first leg of the Al Ahli v Hay Al-Wadi tie, originally scheduled to be played on 12 September 2021 at El-Obeid Stadium, El-Obeid, was called off due to concerns over the suitability of match venue. The match was then played over a single leg, at the venue initially planned for the second leg.)
19:00 UTC+2

| Al Ahli Tripoli (Libya) | 4–0 | (Sudan) Hay Al-Wadi SC |
|---|---|---|
| Maatouk 7'; Taher 39'; Al Tarhuni 67', 81' | Report |

Benina Martyrs Stadium, Benghazi
Referee: Amir Loussif (Tunisia)

12 September 2021
16:00 UTC+3

| CFFA (Madagascar) | 0–0 | (Zambia) Kabwe Warriors |
|---|---|---|
| | Report |

Mahamasina Municipal Stadium, Antananarivo
Referee: Darrio Landry (Seychelles)
19 September 2021
15:00 UTC+2

| Kabwe Warriors (Zambia) | 1–2 | (Madagascar) CFFA |
|---|---|---|
| Mumba 29' | Report | Fanomezana 17' (pen.); Razafindrasata 74' |

National Heroes Stadium, Lusaka
Referee: Artur Alfinar (Mozambique)

CFFA won 2–1 on aggregate.

12 September 2021
19:15 UTC+3

| Mafunzo (Zanzibar) | 0–1 | (Angola) Interclube |
|---|---|---|
| | Report | Paty 28' |

Amaan Stadium, Zanzibar
Referee: Nsoro Ruzindana (Rwanda)
19 September 2021
15:00 UTC+1

| Interclube (Angola) | 3–0 | (Zanzibar) Mafunzo |
|---|---|---|
| Mano-Mano 47', 69'; Calesso 70' | Report |

Estádio Joaquim Dinis, Luanda
Referee: Soulaimane Ansudane (Comoros)

Interclube won 4–0 on aggregate.

== Second round ==
| Team 1 | Agg. | Team 2 | 1st leg | 2nd leg |
|---|---|---|---|---|
| US Ben Guerdane (Tunisia) | 0–5 | (Morocco) RS Berkane | 0–1 | 0–4 |
| AS FAR (Morocco) | 1–3 | (Algeria) JS Kabylie | 0–1 | 1–2 |
| Diambars FC (Senegal) | 0–4 | (Nigeria) Enyimba | 0–1 | 0–3 |
| Bayelsa United (Nigeria) | 1–4 | (Tunisia) CS Sfaxien | 1–0 | 0–4 |
| ASAC Concorde (Mauritania) | 2–3 | (Algeria) JS Saoura | 1–2 | 1–1 |
| Azam (Tanzania) | 0–1 | (Egypt) Pyramids | 0–0 | 0–1 |
| URA Football Club (Uganda) | 0–1 | (Egypt) Al Masry | 0–0 | 0–1 |
| Al-Ahli Merowe (Sudan) | w/o (Note: Gor Mahia won on a walkover after Al-Ahli Merowe withdrew from the second leg in Kenya.) | (Kenya) Gor Mahia | 1–3 | — |
| Marumo Gallants (South Africa) | 3–2 | (Democratic Republic of the Congo) AS Vita Club | 2–1 | 1–1 |
| Orapa United (Botswana) | 2–2 (a) | (Cameroon) Coton Sport | 2–1 | 0–1 |
| CSMD Diables Noirs (Republic of the Congo) | 0–1 | (South Africa) Orlando Pirates | 0–0 | 0–1 |
| Red Arrows (Zambia) | 1–0 | (Angola) Primeiro de Agosto | 1–0 | 0–0 |
| AS Kigali (Rwanda) | 2–4 | (Democratic Republic of the Congo) DC Motema Pembe | 1–2 | 1–2 |
| Binga FC (Mali) | 1–1 (7–6 p) | (Burkina Faso) ASFA Yennenga | 0–1 | 1–0 |
| Biashara United (Tanzania) | w/o (Note: Al Ahli SC won on a walkover after Biashara United failed to appear for the second leg in Libya.) | (Libya) Al Ahli Tripoli | 2–0 | — |
| CFFA (Madagascar) | w/o (Note: Interclube won on a walkover after CFFA withdrew from the second leg in Angola.) | (Angola) Interclube | 0–3 | — |

Notes:

16 October 2021
16:30 UTC+1

| US Ben Guerdane (Tunisia) | 0–1 | (Morocco) RS Berkane |
|---|---|---|
| | Report | El Fahli 10' |

Stade Mustapha Ben Jannet, Monastir
Referee: Mahmoud El Banna (Egypt)
24 October 2021
19:00 UTC+1

| RS Berkane (Morocco) | 4–0 | (Tunisia) US Ben Guerdane |
|---|---|---|
| El Bahraoui 37', 72'; El Helali 77'; El Moudane 87' | Report |

Stade Municipal de Berkane, Berkane
Referee: Mohamed Ali Moussa (Niger)

RS Berkane won 5–0 on aggregate.

16 October 2021
19:00 UTC+1

| AS FAR (Morocco) | 0–1 | (Algeria) JS Kabylie |
|---|---|---|
| | Report | Moufid 19' (o.g.) |

Prince Moulay Abdellah Stadium, Rabat
Referee: Haythem Guirat (Tunisia)
24 October 2021
19:00 UTC+1

| JS Kabylie (Algeria) | 2–1 | (Morocco) AS FAR |
|---|---|---|
| Haroun 55', 90' | Report | Araina 57' |

1 November 1954 Stadium, Tizi Ouzou
Referee: Lenine dos Santos (Cape Verde)

JS Kabylie won 3–1 on aggregate.

16 October 2021
17:00 UTC+0

| Diambars FC (Senegal) | 0–1 | (Nigeria) Enyimba |
|---|---|---|
| | Report | Olisema 86' (pen.) |

Stade Lat-Dior, Thiès
Referee: Abdel Aziz Bouh (Mauritania)
24 October 2021
15:30 UTC+1

| Enyimba (Nigeria) | 3–0 | (Senegal) Diambars FC |
|---|---|---|
| Omoyele 1'; Mbaoma 31'; Kalu 90' | Report |

Enyimba International Stadium, Aba
Referee: Younoussa Camara (Guinea)

Enyimba won 4–0 on aggregate.

17 October 2021
15:00 UTC+1

| Bayelsa United (Nigeria) | 1–0 | (Tunisia) CS Sfaxien |
|---|---|---|
| Beniangba 55' | Report |

Yenagoa Township Stadium, Yenagoa
Referee: Samuel Uwikunda (Rwanda)
23 October 2021
18:00 UTC+1

| CS Sfaxien (Tunisia) | 4–0 | (Nigeria) Bayelsa United |
|---|---|---|
| Kouakou 11'; Ben Ali 18'; Harzi 27'; Chaouat 39' | Report |

Stade Taïeb Mhiri, Sfax
Referee: Lahlou Benbraham (Algeria)

CS Sfaxien won 4–1 on aggregate.

16 October 2021
16:00 UTC+0

| ASAC Concorde (Mauritania) | 1–2 | (Algeria) JS Saoura |
|---|---|---|
| Thiam 8' (pen.) | Report | Lahmeri 85', 88' |

Stade Olympique de Nouakchott, Nouakchott
Referee: Swahib Bangura (Sierra Leone)
23 October 2021
18:00 UTC+1

| JS Saoura (Algeria) | 1–1 | (Mauritania) ASAC Concorde |
|---|---|---|
| Lahmeri 48' | Report | Thiam 90' |

Omar Hamadi Stadium, Algiers
Referee: Shuhoub Abdulbasit (Libya)

JS Saoura won 3–2 on aggregate.

16 October 2021
15:00 UTC+3

| Azam (Tanzania) | 0–0 | (Egypt) Pyramids |
|---|---|---|
| | Report |

Chamazi Stadium, Mbagala
Referee: Omar Artan (Somalia)
23 October 2021
21:00 UTC+2

| Pyramids (Egypt) | 1–0 | (Tanzania) Azam |
|---|---|---|
| Gabr 29' | Report |

30 June Stadium, Cairo
Referee: Georges Gatogato (Burundi)

Pyramids won 1–0 on aggregate.

16 October 2021
16:00 UTC+3

| URA Football Club (Uganda) | 0–0 | (Egypt) Al Masry |
|---|---|---|
| | Report |

St. Mary's Stadium-Kitende, Entebbe
Referee: Ring Malong (South Sudan)
23 October 2021
19:00 UTC+2

| Al Masry (Egypt) | 1–0 | (Uganda) URA Football Club |
|---|---|---|
| Attia 26' | Report |

Alexandria Stadium, Alexandria
Referee: Tsegay Mogos Teklu (Eritrea)

Al Masry won 1–0 on aggregate.

15 October 2021
19:00 UTC+2

| Al-Ahli Merowe (Sudan) | 1–3 | (Kenya) Gor Mahia |
|---|---|---|
| Saeed 41' | Report | Onyango 55' (pen.); Omala 65'; Ulimwengu 70' |

Suez Stadium, Suez (Egypt)
Referee: Jean Ouattara (Burkina Faso)
24 October 2021
16:00 UTC+3

| Gor Mahia (Kenya) | Cancelled | (Sudan) Al-Ahli Merowe |
|---|---|---|
| | Report |

Nyayo National Stadium, Nairobi

Gor Mahia won on walkover after Al-Ahli Merowe withdrew from the second leg in Kenya.

15 October 2021
18:00 UTC+2

| Marumo Gallants (South Africa) | 2–1 | (Democratic Republic of the Congo) AS Vita Club |
|---|---|---|
| Ngema 18', 58' | Report | Ngongo 86' |

Peter Mokaba Stadium, Polokwane
Referee: Mohamed Athoumani (Comoros)
22 October 2021
15:00 UTC+1

| AS Vita Club (Democratic Republic of the Congo) | 1–1 | (South Africa) Marumo Gallants |
|---|---|---|
| Mangoba 19' | Report | Nkosi 89' |

Stade des Martyrs, Kinshasa
Referee: Tewodros Mitiku (Ethiopia)

Marumo Gallants won 3–2 on aggregate.

16 October 2021
15:00 UTC+2

| Orapa United (Botswana) | 2–1 | (Cameroon) Coton Sport |
|---|---|---|
| Elias 23'; Mosige 61' | Report | Marou 47' |

Botswana National Stadium, Gaborone
Referee: Thulani Sibandze (Eswatini)
23 October 2021
15:00 UTC+1

| Coton Sport (Cameroon) | 1–0 | (Botswana) Orapa United |
|---|---|---|
| Limane 88' | Report |

Roumdé Adjia Stadium, Garoua
Referee: Pierre Atcho (Gabon)

2–2 on aggregate. Coton Sport won on away goals.

15 October 2021
15:30 UTC+1

| CSMD Diables Noirs (Republic of the Congo) | 0–0 | (South Africa) Orlando Pirates |
|---|---|---|
| | Report |

Stade Alphonse Massemba-Débat, Brazzaville
Referee: Gnama Aklesso (Togo)
October 2021
17:30 UTC+2

| Orlando Pirates (South Africa) | 1–0 | (Republic of the Congo) CSMD Diables Noirs |
|---|---|---|
| Jele 18' | Report |

Orlando Stadium, Soweto
Referee: Brighton Chimene (Zimbabwe)

Orlando Pirates won 1–0 on aggregate.

16 October 2021
15:00 UTC+2

| Red Arrows (Zambia) | 1–0 | (Angola) Primeiro de Agosto |
|---|---|---|
| Chamanga 37' | Report |

National Heroes Stadium, Lusaka
Referee: Blaise Yuven Ngwa (Cameroon)
24 October 2021
16:00 UTC+1

| Primeiro de Agosto (Angola) | 0–0 | (Zambia) Red Arrows |
|---|---|---|
| | Report |

Estádio 11 de Novembro, Luanda
Referee: Retselisitsoe Molise (Lesotho)

Red Arrows won 1–0 on aggregate.

17 October 2021
15:00 UTC+2

| AS Kigali (Rwanda) | 1–2 | (Democratic Republic of the Congo) DC Motema Pembe |
|---|---|---|
| Kwizera 61' | Report | Likuta 9'; Katulondi 44' |

Nyamirambo Regional Stadium, Kigali
Referee: Mahamadou Keita (Mali)
24 October 2021
15:00 UTC+1

| DC Motema Pembe (Democratic Republic of the Congo) | 2–1 | (Rwanda) AS Kigali |
|---|---|---|
| Katulondi 26'; Kimvuidi 48' | Report | Kwizera 45' |

Stade des Martyrs, Kinshasa
Referee: Sabri Mohamed Fadul (Sudan)

DC Motema Pembe won 4–2 on aggregate.

15 October 2021
16:30 UTC+0

| Binga FC (Mali) | 0–1 | (Burkina Faso) ASFA Yennenga |
|---|---|---|
| | Report | Noufé 28' |

Stade Modibo Kéïta, Bamako
Referee: Hassan Corneh (Liberia)
23 October 2021
16:00 UTC+0

| ASFA Yennenga (Burkina Faso) | 0–1 | (Mali) Binga FC |
|---|---|---|
| | Report | Diaby 85' |
Penalties
| Penalty scored Penalty missed | 6–7 | Penalty scored Penalty missed |

Stade Robert Champroux, Abidjan (Ivory Coast)
Referee: Issa Mouhamed (Benin)

1–1 on aggregate. Binga FC won 7–6 on penalties.

15 October 2021
15:00 UTC+3

| Biashara United (Tanzania) | 2–0 | (Libya) Al Ahli Tripoli |
|---|---|---|
| Deogratius 39'; Green 61' | Report |

Benjamin Mkapa National Stadium, Dar es Salaam
Referee: Joseph Ogabor (Nigeria)
23 October 2021
19:00 UTC+2

| Al Ahli Tripoli (Libya) | Cancelled | (Tanzania) Biashara United |
|---|---|---|
| | Report |

Benina Martyrs Stadium, Benghazi

Al Ahli Tripoli won on walkover after Biashara United failed to appear for the second leg in Libya.

17 October 2021
16:00 UTC+3

| CFFA (Madagascar) | 0–3 | (Angola) Interclube |
|---|---|---|
| | Report | Calesso 12'; Mano-Mano 15', 90' |

Mahamasina Municipal Stadium, Antananarivo
Referee: Ramadhani Kayoko (Tanzania)
22 October 2021
15:00 UTC+1

| Interclube (Angola) | Cancelled | (Madagascar) CFFA |
|---|---|---|
| | Report |

Estádio Joaquim Dinis, Luanda

Interclube won on walkover after CFFA withdrew from the second leg in Angola.

== Play-off round ==
The play-off round, also called the additional second preliminary round, included 32 teams: the 16 winners of the Confederation Cup second round, and the 16 losers of the Champions League second round.

The draw for the play-off round was held on 26 October 2021, 11:00 GMT (13:00 local time, UTC+2), at the CAF headquarters in Cairo, Egypt.

The teams were seeded by their performances in the CAF competitions for the previous five seasons (CAF 5-year ranking points shown in parentheses):

- Pot A contained the 4 seeded losers of the Champions League first round.
- Pot B contained the 4 unseeded winners of the Confederation Cup first round.
- Pot C contained the 12 unseeded losers of the Champions League first round.
- Pot D contained the 12 seeded winners of the Confederation Cup first round.

| Pot | Pot A | Pot B | Pot C | Pot D |
| Qualified from | Champions League | Confederation Cup | Champions League | Confederation Cup |
|---|---|---|---|---|
| Teams | (Democratic Republic of the Congo) TP Mazembe (45 pts); (Tanzania) Simba (24 pts); (Zambia) Zanaco (10 pts); (Ivory Coast) ASEC Mimosas (5 pts) | (South Africa) Marumo Gallants; (Zambia) Red Arrows; (Mali) Binga FC; (Angola) Interclube | (Mauritania) FC Nouadhibou (2 pts); (Republic of the Congo) AS Otohô (1.5 pts); (Nigeria) Rivers United (0.5 pt); (Ghana) Hearts of Oak; (Liberia) LPRC Oilers; (Mali) Stade Malien; (Niger) USGN; (Libya) Al Ittihad; (Kenya) Tusker; (Rwanda) APR; (Democratic Republic of the Congo) AS Maniema Union; (Eswatini) Royal Leopards | (Morocco) RS Berkane (41 pts); (Egypt) Pyramids (31 pts); (Algeria) JS Kabylie (28 pts); (Nigeria) Enyimba (24 pts); (Tunisia) CS Sfaxien (21 pts); (Cameroon) Coton Sport (16 pts); (South Africa) Orlando Pirates (16 pts); (Egypt) Al Masry (14 pts); (Kenya) Gor Mahia (8 pts); (Algeria) JS Saoura (6 pts); (Democratic Republic of the Congo) DC Motema Pembe (4 pts); (Libya) Al Ahli Tripoli (3 pts) |

| Team 1 | Agg. | Team 2 | 1st leg | 2nd leg |
|---|---|---|---|---|
| Zanaco (Zambia) | 3–2 | (Mali) Binga FC | 3–0 | 0–2 |
| Simba (Tanzania) | 4–2 | (Zambia) Red Arrows | 3–0 | 1–2 |
| TP Mazembe (Democratic Republic of the Congo) | 1–0 | (South Africa) Marumo Gallants | 1–0 | 0–0 |
| ASEC Mimosas (Ivory Coast) | 5–2 | (Angola) Interclube | 2–0 | 3–2 |
| FC Nouadhibou (Mauritania) | 0–2 | (Cameroon) Coton Sport | 0–0 | 0–2 |
| USGN (Niger) | 2–1 | (Democratic Republic of the Congo) DC Motema Pembe | 2–0 | 0–1 |
| AS Otohô (Republic of the Congo) | 2–1 | (Kenya) Gor Mahia | 1–0 | 1–1 |
| APR (Rwanda) | 1–2 | (Morocco) RS Berkane | 0–0 | 1–2 |
| Tusker (Kenya) | 0–1 | (Tunisia) CS Sfaxien | 0–0 | 0–1 |
| Hearts of Oak (Ghana) | 2–4 | (Algeria) JS Saoura | 2–0 | 0–4 |
| Rivers United (Nigeria) | 2–2 (a) | (Egypt) Al Masry | 2–1 | 0–1 |
| Stade Malien (Mali) | 1–1 (2–4 p) | (Libya) Al Ahli Tripoli | 1–0 | 0–1 |
| Al Ittihad (Libya) | w/o (Note: Al Ittihad won on a walkover after Enyimba failed to travel to Libya for the first leg.) | (Nigeria) Enyimba | — | 0–2 |
| AS Maniema Union (Democratic Republic of the Congo) | 0–2 | (Egypt) Pyramids | 0–1 | 0–1 |
| LPRC Oilers (Liberia) | w/o (Note: Orlando Pirates won on a walkover after LPRC Oilers withdrew from the second leg in South Africa.) | (South Africa) Orlando Pirates | 0–2 | — |
| Royal Leopards (Eswatini) | 2–2 (a) | (Algeria) JS Kabylie | 1–0 | 1–2 |

Notes:

28 November 2021
15:00 UTC+2

| Zanaco (Zambia) | 3–0 | (Mali) Binga FC |
|---|---|---|
| Siankombo 36'; Phiri 51', 72' | Report |

National Heroes Stadium, Lusaka
Referee: Patrice Milazar (Mauritius)
5 December 2021
16:30 UTC+0

| Binga FC (Mali) | 2–0 | (Zambia) Zanaco |
|---|---|---|
| Diallo 80'; Coulibaly 90' (pen.) | Report |

Stade Modibo Keita, Bamako
Referee: Babacar Sarr (Mauritania)

Zanaco won 3–2 on aggregate.

28 November 2021
16:00 UTC+3

| Simba (Tanzania) | 3–0 | (Zambia) Red Arrows |
|---|---|---|
| Morrison 16', 77'; Kagere 19' | Report |

National Stadium, Dar es Salaam
Referee: Chelanget Sabila (Uganda)
5 December 2021
15:00 UTC+2

| Red Arrows (Zambia) | 2–1 | (Tanzania) Simba |
|---|---|---|
| Banda 44'; S. Phiri 47' | Report | Dilunga 67' |

Heroes National Stadium, Lusaka
Referee: Celso Alvação (Mozambique)

Simba won 4–2 on aggregate.

28 November 2021
15:00 UTC+1

| TP Mazembe (Democratic Republic of the Congo) | 1–0 | (South Africa) Marumo Gallants |
|---|---|---|
| Nonyane 45' (o.g.) | Report |

Stade TP Mazembe, Lubumbashi
Referee: Georges Gatogato (Burundi)
5 December 2021
15:30 UTC+2

| Marumo Gallants (South Africa) | 0–0 | (Democratic Republic of the Congo) TP Mazembe |
|---|---|---|
| | Report |

Peter Mokaba Stadium, Polokwane
Referee: Blaise Yuven Ngwa (Cameroon)

TP Mazembe won 1–0 on aggregate.

28 November 2021
16:00 UTC+0

| ASEC Mimosas (Ivory Coast) | 2–0 | (Angola) Interclube |
|---|---|---|
| Konaté 48', 89' | Report |

Stade Robert Champroux, Abidjan
Referee: Al Hadi Mahamat (Chad)
5 December 2021
15:00 UTC+1

| Interclube (Angola) | 2–3 | (Ivory Coast) ASEC Mimosas |
|---|---|---|
| Calesso 5', 62' | Report | Diakité 2'; Konaté 18'; Ki 34' |

Estádio Joaquim Dinis, Luanda
Referee: Lemma Nigussie (Ethiopia)

ASEC Mimosas won 5–2 on aggregate.

28 November 2021
16:00 UTC+0

| FC Nouadhibou (Mauritania) | 0–0 | (Cameroon) Coton Sport |
|---|---|---|
| | Report |

Complexe Olympique, Nouakchott
Referee: Mehrez Melki (Tunisia)
5 December 2021
15:00 UTC+1

| Coton Sport (Cameroon) | 2–0 | (Mauritania) FC Nouadhibou |
|---|---|---|
| Marou 22', 28' (pen.) | Report |

Stade de la Réunification, Douala
Referee: Messie Nkounkou (Congo)

Coton Sport won 2–0 on aggregate.

28 November 2021
16:30 UTC+1

| USGN (Niger) | 2–0 | (Democratic Republic of the Congo) DC Motema Pembe |
|---|---|---|
| Gbeuli 48'; Hinsa 73' | Report |

Stade Général Seyni Kountché, Niamey
Referee: Clement Franklin Kpan (Ivory Coast)
5 December 2021
15:00 UTC+1

| DC Motema Pembe (Democratic Republic of the Congo) | 1–0 | (Niger) USGN |
|---|---|---|
| Likuta 52' | Report |

Stade des Martyrs, Kinshasa
Referee: Jean Claude Ishimwe (Rwanda)

USGN won 2–1 on aggregate.

28 November 2021
15:30 UTC+1

| AS Otohô (Republic of the Congo) | 1–0 | (Kenya) Gor Mahia |
|---|---|---|
| Okouri 64' | Report |

Stade Alphonse Massamba Debat, Brazzaville
Referee: Pierre Atcho (Gabon)
5 December 2021
16:00 UTC+3

| Gor Mahia (Kenya) | 1–1 | (Republic of the Congo) AS Otohô |
|---|---|---|
| Macharia 12' | Report | Okouri 10' |

Nyayo National Stadium, Nairobi
Referee: Hassan Hagi (Somalia)

AS Otohô won 2–1 on aggregate.

28 November 2021
15:00 UTC+2

| APR (Rwanda) | 0–0 | (Morocco) RS Berkane |
|---|---|---|
| | Report |

Stade Regional de Kigali, Kigali
Referee: Souleiman Djama (Djibouti)
5 December 2021
19:00 UTC+1

| RS Berkane (Morocco) | 2–1 | (Rwanda) APR |
|---|---|---|
| Naji 67'; Aziz 76' | Report | Byiringiro 44' |

Stade Municipal de Berkane, Berkane
Referee: Jean Ouattara (Burkina Faso)

RS Berkane won 2–1 on aggregate.

28 November 2021
15:00 UTC+3

| Tusker (Kenya) | 0–0 | (Tunisia) CS Sfaxien |
|---|---|---|
| | Report |

Nyayo National Stadium, Nairobi
Referee: Thando Ndzandzeka (South Africa)
5 December 2021
18:00 UTC+1

| CS Sfaxien (Tunisia) | 1–0 | (Kenya) Tusker |
|---|---|---|
| Harzi 35' | Report |

Stade Taïeb Mhiri, Sfax
Referee: Mutaz Ibrahim (Libya)

CS Sfaxien won 1–0 on aggregate.

28 November 2021
15:00 UTC+0

| Hearts of Oak (Ghana) | 2–0 | (Algeria) JS Saoura |
|---|---|---|
| Ibrahim 16'; Boateng 72' | Report |

Accra Sports Stadium, Accra
Referee: Mohamed Adel (Egypt)
5 December 2021
17:45 UTC+1

| JS Saoura (Algeria) | 4–0 | (Ghana) Hearts of Oak |
|---|---|---|
| Saâd 21'; Alhassan 36' (o.g.); Bellatrèche 48'; Lahmeri 88' | Report |

20 August Stadium, Béchar
Referee: Adalbert Diouf (Senegal)

JS Saoura won 4–2 on aggregate.

28 November 2021
16:00 UTC+1

| Rivers United (Nigeria) | 2–1 | (Egypt) Al Masry |
|---|---|---|
| Onwuansanya 24'; Rafiu 34' | Report | Ali 26' |

Enyimba International Stadium, Aba
Referee: Mohamed Ali Moussa (Niger)
5 December 2021
19:00 UTC+2

| Al Masry (Egypt) | 1–0 | (Nigeria) Rivers United |
|---|---|---|
| Grendo 12' | Report |

Borg El Arab Stadium, Alexandria
Referee: Komlanvi Aklassou (Togo)

2–2 on aggregate. Al Masry won on away goals.

28 November 2021
16:00 UTC+0

| Stade Malien (Mali) | 1–0 | (Libya) Al Ahli Tripoli |
|---|---|---|
| Sissoko 45' | Report |

Stade Modibo Keita, Bamako
Referee: Djindo Houngnandande (Benin)
5 December 2021
18:00 UTC+2

| Al Ahli Tripoli (Libya) | 1–0 | (Mali) Stade Malien |
|---|---|---|
| Alshiteewi 55' | Report |
Penalties
| | 4–2 |

Benina Martyrs Stadium, Benghazi
Referee: Joseph Odey Ogabor (Nigeria)

1–1 on aggregate. Al Ahli Tripoli won 4–2 on penalties.

5 December 2021
15:30 UTC+1

| Enyimba (Nigeria) | 2–0 | (Libya) Al Ittihad |
|---|---|---|
| Adamu 21'; Mbaoma 34' | Report |

Enyimba International Stadium, Aba
Referee: Mahamadou Kéïta (Mali)
19 December 2021 (First leg) (Note: The first leg of the Al Ittihad v Enyimba tie, originally scheduled to be played on 28 November 2021 at Stade Mustapha Ben Jannet, Monastir, Tunisia, was postponed to 19 December at Benina Martyrs Stadium, Benghazi because the Tunisian authorities refused to enter the Nigerian team without receiving the second dose of the Coronavirus vaccine, the match was supposed be played after the second leg.)
18:00 UTC+2

| Al Ittihad (Libya) | Cancelled | (Nigeria) Enyimba |
|---|---|---|
| | Report |

Benina Martyrs Stadium, Benghazi

Al Ittihad won on walkover after Enyimba failed to travel to Libya for the first leg.

28 November 2021
16:00 UTC+1

| AS Maniema Union (Democratic Republic of the Congo) | 0–1 | (Egypt) Pyramids |
|---|---|---|
| | Report | Wadi 25' |

Stade des Martyrs, Kinshasa
Referee: Belay Tadesse (Ethiopia)
5 December 2021
18:00 UTC+2

| Pyramids (Egypt) | 1–0 | (Democratic Republic of the Congo) AS Maniema Union |
|---|---|---|
| Adel 36' | Report |

30 June Stadium, Cairo
Referee: Mehdi Abid Charef (Algeria)

Pyramids won 2–0 on aggregate.

28 November 2021
16:00 UTC+0

| LPRC Oilers (Liberia) | 0–2 | (South Africa) Orlando Pirates |
|---|---|---|
| | Report | Mabaso 43'; Makaringe 90' |

Samuel Kanyon Doe Sports Complex, Monrovia
Referee: Abdulrazg Ahmed (Libya)
5 December 2021
17:30 UTC+2

| Orlando Pirates (South Africa) | Cancelled | (Liberia) LPRC Oilers |
|---|---|---|
| | Report |

Orlando Stadium, Johannesburg

Orlando Pirates won on walkover after LPRC Oilers withdrew from the second leg in South Africa.

28 November 2021
15:00 UTC+2

| Royal Leopards (Eswatini) | 1–0 | (Algeria) JS Kabylie |
|---|---|---|
| Mokenkoane 23' | Report |

Mavuso Sports Centre, Manzini
Referee: Nelson Emile (Seychelles)
6 February 2022 (Note: The second leg of the JS Kabylie v Royal Leopards tie, originally scheduled to be played on 5 December 2021 at 1 November 1954 Stadium, Tizi Ouzou, was postponed to 20 December at Omar Hamadi Stadium, Algiers then to 26 January and 27 January 2022 later at the previous location due to the Algerian authorities fears of the spread of COVID-19 Omicron variant in South Africa. Later the match was again postponed to 6 February 2022, as Royal Leopards were stuck in Cairo and could not connect to Turkey for their flight to Algiers due to storms.)
18:00 UTC+1

| JS Kabylie (Algeria) | 2–1 | (Eswatini) Royal Leopards |
|---|---|---|
| Doumbia 3'; El Orfi 88' (pen.) | Report | Magagula 16' |

1 November 1954 Stadium, Tizi Ouzou
Referee: Naïm Hosni (Tunisia)

2–2 on aggregate. Royal Leopards won on away goals.
