= List of football clubs in Seychelles =

This is a list of football clubs based in Seychelles. For a complete list see Category:Football clubs in Seychelles

== A ==
- Anse Réunion FC (Anse Réunion)

== B ==
- Bambas bamblets FC

== C ==
- Côte d'Or FC (Praslin)

== F ==
- Foresters (Mont Fleuri)

== K ==
- Kanye Youth FC

== L ==
- La Passe FC (La Passe)
- Light Stars FC (Grande Anse)

== N ==
- Northern Dynamo (Glacis)

== Q ==
- Quincy FC

== R ==
- Rovers FC

== S ==
- St Francis FC (Baie Lazare)
- St Louis Suns United (Victoria)
- St Michel United FC (Anse-aux-Pins)
- St Roch United FC (Bel Ombre)
- Super Magic Brothers

== T ==
- The Lions (Cascade)
