= 2011 in Seychellois football =

The 2011 season is the 37th season of competitive football in Seychelles.

== National teams ==
The home team or the team that is designated as the home team is listed in the left column; the away team is in the right column.

Win Draw Loss

=== Senior ===
==== Friendly matches ====
22 November 2011 International Friendly	Maldives	3 – 0	Seychelles	Malé, Maldives
21:00 UTC+05	Thariq 13', 45'; Ashfaq 78'	(Report)		Stadium: Rasmee Dhandu Stadium

24 November 2011 International Friendly	Maldives	2 – 1	Seychelles	Malé, Maldives
21:00 UTC+05	Fazeel	(Report)	Coralie 49'	Stadium: Rasmee Dhandu Stadium

==== 2011 Indian Ocean Island Games ====
4 August 2011 Group A	Seychelles	0–0	Comoros	Malé, Maldives
14:00 UTC+04		Report		Stadium: Stade d'Amitié; Attendance: 1,800; Referee: Steeve Dubec (Réunion)

6 August 2011 Group A	Seychelles	2–1	Mauritius	Victoria, Seychelles
16:30 UTC+04	Laurence 1'; Henriette 28'	Report	Pithia 77'	Stadium: Stade Linité; Attendance: 6,500; Referee: Harouna Rassuhi (Mayotte)

9 August 2011 Group A	Seychelles	5–1	Maldives	Victoria, Seychelles
18:00 UTC+04	Laurence 16'; Anacoura 23'; Henriette 62'; Baldé 75', 80'	Report	Qasim 26'	Stadium: Stade Linité; Attendance: 5,500; Referee: Jean-Pierre Rakotonjanahary (Madagascar)

11 August 2011 Semifinals	Seychelles	2–1 (a.e.t.)	Réunion	Victoria, Seychelles
15:00 UTC+04		Report		Stadium: Stade Linité; Attendance: 6,500

13 August 2011 Final	Seychelles	0–0 (a.e.t.) (4–3 p)	Mauritius	Victoria, Seychelles
17:30 UTC+04		Report		Stadium: Stade Linité; Attendance: 10,000; Referee: Steeve Dubec (Réunion)

==== 2014 FIFA World Cup qualification ====
11 November 2011 First round	Seychelles	0 – 3	Kenya	Victoria, Seychelles
17:00 UTC+04		(Report)	Ochieng 41'; Oliech 78', 81'	Stadium: Stade Linité; Attendance: 2,000; Referee: Dennis Batte (Uganda)

15 November 2011 First round	Kenya	4 – 0	Seychelles	Nairobi, Kenya
16:00 UTC+03	Mandela 19'; Oliech 36'; Mulama 45+1'; Wanyama 74'	(Report)		Stadium: Nyayo National Stadium; Attendance: 5,000; Referee: Victor Gomes (South Africa)

== Seychelles First Division ==
Pos	Team	Pld	W	D	L	GF	GA	GD	Pts	Qualification or relegation
1	St Michel United	18	13	4	1	42	11	+31	43	
2	La Passe	18	12	4	2	44	17	+27	40	
3	Côte d'Or	18	10	3	5	29	14	+15	33	
4	Anse Réunion	18	8	2	8	37	33	+4	26	
5	LightStars	18	6	5	7	36	39	−3	23	
6	Northern Dynamo	18	6	4	8	19	29	−10	22	
7	St Francis	18	6	3	9	28	37	−9	21	
8	St Louis Suns United	18	5	2	11	20	26	−6	17	
9	St Roch United	18	4	4	10	34	57	−23	16	Qualification for Relegation play-off
10	The Lions FC	18	4	1	13	22	48	−26	13	Relegation to second level

Updated to match(es) played on 8 November 2011. Source: FIFA.com
Rules for classification: 1) points; 2) goal difference; 3) number of goals scored.

== Seychellois clubs in international competitions ==
Club	Competition	Final round
St Michel United	2011 CAF Champions League	Preliminary round

=== St Michel United FC ===
30 January 2011 Champions League preliminary round	Young Buffaloes (Eswatini)	3–0	(Seychelles) St Michel United	Manzini, Swaziland
15:00 UTC+02	Thumbatha 5'; Mthethwa 59'; Dlamini 67'	Report		Stadium: Mavuso Sports Centre

13 February 2011 Champions League preliminary round	St Michel United (Seychelles)	2–1	(Eswatini) Young Buffaloes	Victoria, Seychelles
16:30 UTC+04		Report		Stadium: Stade Linité
