= FSSC =

FSSC may refer to:

- Coëtivy Airport, Seychelles
- Federated Supreme Student Council, a student association at Laguna State Polytechnic University, Santa Cruz, Philippines
- Foundation Skills for Social Change Certificate Programme, International Federation of Workers' Education Associations#Foundation Skills for Social Change Certificate Programme
- F.S.Sc., letters appended after the name of a member of the Society of Science, Letters and Art
- FSSC 22000, an international food safety system certification scheme

== See also ==
- FSSC-R or Fear Survey Schedule for Children, a test for death anxiety in children
