= Radoniaina Rabemanantsoa =

Malagasy footballer

Personal information
- Full name: Radoniaina Rabemanantsoa
- Date of birth: 17 December 1997 (age 28)
- Place of birth: Antananarivo, Madagascar
- Height: 1.70 m (5 ft 7 in)
- Position: Right-back

Team information
- Current team: AS Fanalamanga

Senior career*
Years	Team	Apps	(Gls)
2017–2022	JET Kintana		
2022–2024	CFF Andoharanofotsy		
2024	ASSM Elgeco Plus		
2024–	AS Fanalamanga		

International career^{‡}
2019–	Madagascar	27	(0)
- * Club domestic league appearances and goals as of 18:00, 2 June 2026 (UTC) ‡ National team caps and goals as of 18:00, 2 June 2026 (UTC)

Radoniaina Rabemanantsoa (born 17 December 1997) is a Malagasy professional footballer who plays as a right-back for AS Fanalamanga in the Malagasy Pro League and the Madagascar national team.

== Club career ==
Rabemanantsoa began his senior career at JET Kintana, a club based in the Itasy Region of Madagascar competing in the Malagasy Pro League, representing them across multiple seasons from 2017. He subsequently played for JET-Kintana Itasy before joining CFF Andoharanofotsy — also known as CFFA — in July 2022, a club based in a suburb of Antananarivo that competed in the top flight of Malagasy football.

In July 2024, Rabemanantsoa joined ASSM Elgeco Plus, one of Madagascar's most prominent clubs based in Antananarivo and regular participants in the CAF Champions League. He subsequently moved to AS Fanalamanga, who finished runners-up in the Malagasy Pro League in the 2024 season, where he has established himself as a regular starter and first-choice right back.

== International career ==
Rabemanantsoa made his senior debut for Madagascar in 2019 and has gone on to become a consistent presence in the squad. He was a regular starter during Madagascar's 2025 Africa Cup of Nations campaign in Tanzania.

During the 2026 FIFA World Cup qualification campaign, Rabemanantsoa was a key member of Madagascar's defence, featuring in their group matches. He was named in the squad for the matches against Central African Republic and Chad in September 2025. He featured at right back as Madagascar defeated Chad 3–1 on 8 September 2025. He also provided the assist for Madagascar's second goal in their 2–1 victory over Comoros on 8 October 2025, helping keep the team's World Cup qualification hopes alive.

Rabemanantsoa was also part of the squad for Madagascar's AFCON 2025 qualifying campaign, featuring in matches against Gambia, Tunisia and Comoros.
