= Anse aux Pins =

Coordinates: 4°41′S 55°31′E

- District

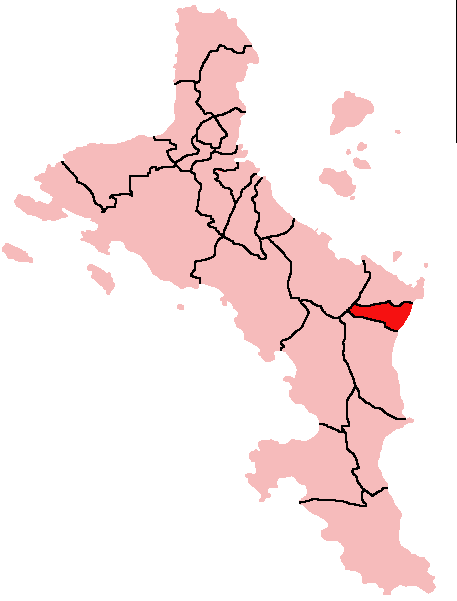
- Location within Seychelles
- Country: Seychelles

Government
  - District Administrator: Travis Chang Pen Tive
  - Member of National Assembly: Hon. Clifford Andre (LDS)

Area
  - Total: 2.3 km^{2} (0.89 sq mi)

Population (2019 Estimate)
  - Total: 4,236
  - Density: 1,800/km^{2} (4,800/sq mi)
- Time zone: Seychelles Time

Anse aux Pins (French pronunciation: [ɑ̃s o pɛ̃]) is an administrative district of Seychelles located on the island of Mahé. Soleil Island is part of the district.

== Geography ==
Anse aux Pins is situated in the East Region of Mahe, and is bordered by Cascade, Pointe Larue, and Au Cap Districts. There are nine sub-districts: Anse Faure, Anse Aux Pins Central, Bodamien, Cayole, Ramo, Berlin, Capucin, Anse Aux Pins Reef Estate, and Ile Soleil.

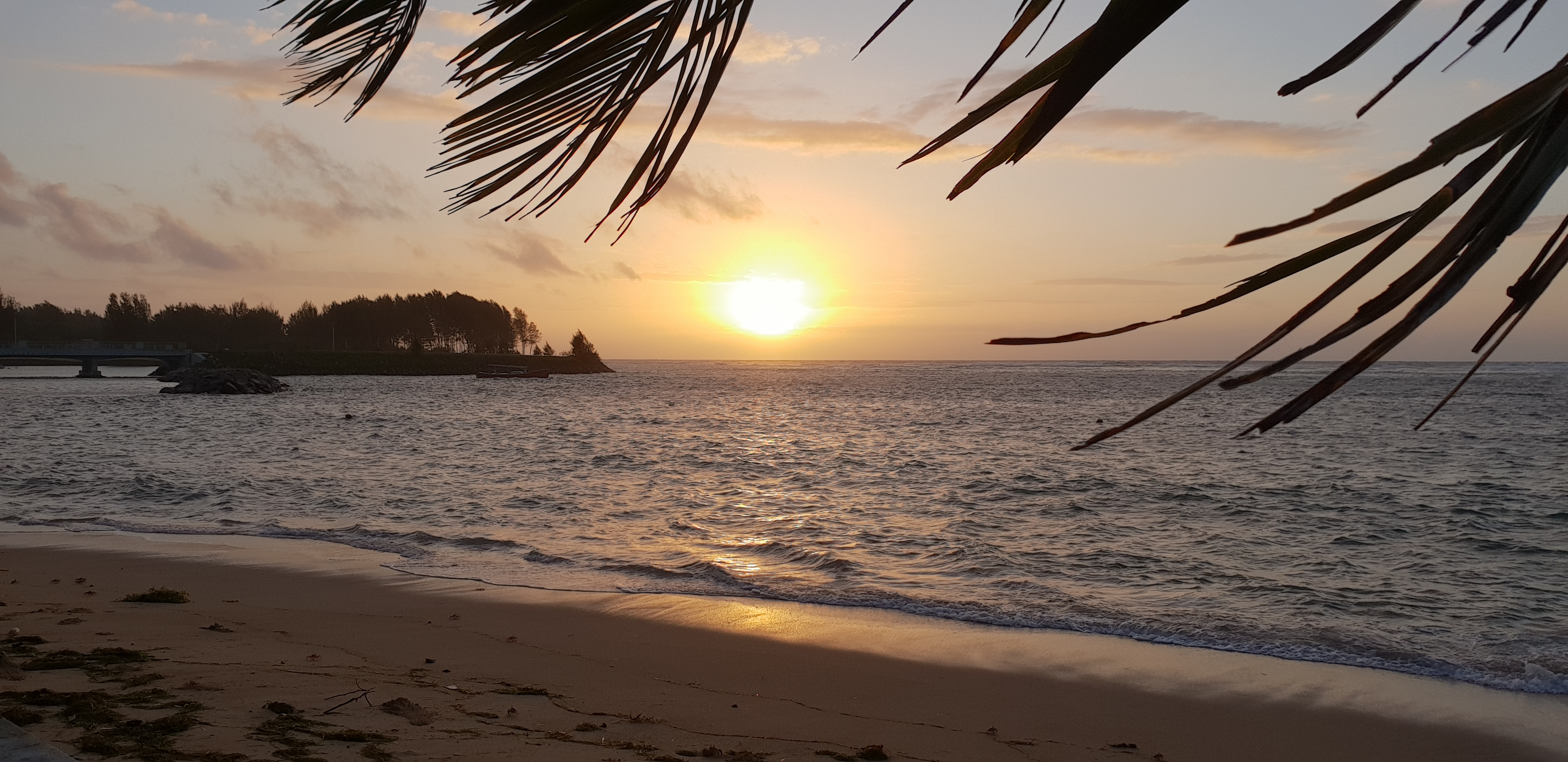
Beach landscape in Anse-aux-Pins

== Politics ==
=== Election results ===
2016 National Assembly Election for Anse aux Pins
Name	Votes	Percent	Outcome
Clifford Andre, Linyon Demokratik Seselwa	1,455	50.2%	Won
Vicky Josette, Parti Lepep	1,333	46.0%	Lost
Danny Sophia, Independent	78	2.7%	Lost
Jeremy Baron, Seychelles Patriotic Movement	31	1.1%	Lost

== Demographics ==
Change in population
Year	Pop.	±%
2010	3,850	—
2015	3,955	+2.7%
2016	4,008	+1.3%
2017	4,159	+3.8%
2018	4,198	+0.9%
2019	4,236	+0.9%
2010 is a census figure and the 2015-2019 figures are estimates. Source:

The National Bureau of Statistics Seychelles estimates that there are 4,236 residents of Anse aux Pins as of 2019.

== Transportation ==
The Seychelles Public Transport Corporation runs bus service through Anse aux Pins. The district's bus terminal was reconstructed in 2018.

== Education ==
Anse aux Pins is served by Anse aux Pins Primary School.

== See also ==
- Mahé Island
