= Rukundo =

Rukundo is a surname. It is a Runyankole word meaning "love". Notable people with the surname include:

- Denis Rukundo (born 1996), Rwandan footballer
- Emmanuel Rukundo (born 1959), Rwandan Catholic priest and war criminal
- Noela Rukundo, Burundian–Australian woman who crashed her own funeral
- Omar Mbanza Mussa Rukundo (born 1980), Burundian footballer
- Sam Rukundo (born 1980), Ugandan boxer
- Serapio Rukundo (born 1952), Ugandan politician
