= Tunjo (disambiguation) =

A tunjo is a zoomorph figure elaborated by the Muisca as part of their art. Tunjo may also refer to:

== People ==
- Asrat Tunjo (born 1996), Ethiopian footballer
- Óscar Tunjo (born 1996), Colombian racing driver

== Other uses ==
- Piedras del Tunjo Archaeological Park, park in Colombia
