= People's Stadium, Seychelles =

Coordinates: 4.624616°S 55.454199°E

People's Stadium
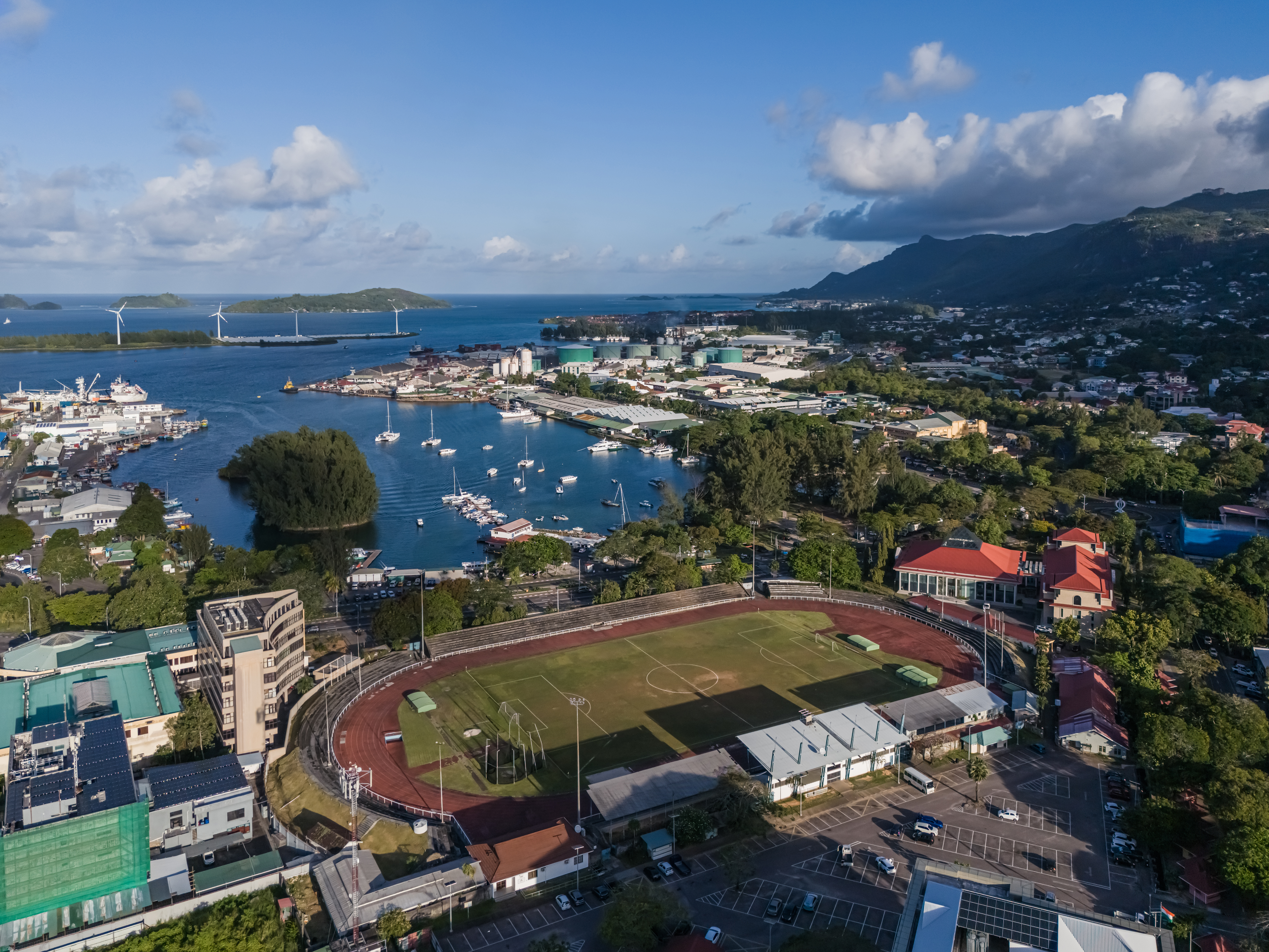
- Interactive map of People's Stadium
- Full name: People's Stadium
- Location: Victoria, Seychelles
- Capacity: 7,000

Construction
- Opened: 1970

Tenants
- Rovers FC; Super Magic Brothers

People's Stadium is a multi-use stadium in Victoria, Seychelles. It is currently used mostly for football matches, on club level by Rovers FC of the Seychelles Third Division. The stadium has a capacity of 7,000 spectators. It was the home of the Seychelles national football team until Stade Linité opened in 1992.
