= Madagascar national football team results (2020–present) =

This page details the match results and statistics of the Madagascar national football team from 2020 to present.

== Results ==
Madagascar's score is shown first in each case.

Date	Venue	Opponents	Score	Competition	Madagascar scorers	Att.	Ref.
12 October 2020	Stade El Abdi, El Jadida (N)	Burkina Faso	1–2	Friendly	Ilaimaharitra 44' (pen.)	0 (Note: Match held behind closed doors due to the COVID-19 pandemic.)	
12 November 2020	Stade Olympique d'Ebimpé, Abidjan (A)	Ivory Coast	1–2	2021 Africa Cup of Nations qualification	Voavy 59'	0	
17 November 2020	Barikadimy Stadium, Toamasina (H)	Ivory Coast	1–1	2021 Africa Cup of Nations qualification	Amada 51'	0	
24 March 2021	Bahir Dar Stadium, Bahir Dar (A)	Ethiopia	0–4	2021 Africa Cup of Nations qualification	—		
30 March 2021	Barikadimy Stadium, Toamasina (H)	Niger	0–0	2021 Africa Cup of Nations qualification	—		
2 September 2021	Mahamasina Municipal Stadium, Antananarivo (H)	Benin	0–1	2022 FIFA World Cup qualification	—	10,000	
7 September 2021	National Stadium, Dar es Salaam (A)	Tanzania	2–3	2022 FIFA World Cup qualification	Rakotoharimalala 36', Fontaine 45+2'		
7 October 2021	Stade des Martyrs, Kinshasa (A)	DR Congo	0–2	2022 FIFA World Cup qualification			
10 October 2021	Mahamasina Municipal Stadium, Antananarivo (H)	DR Congo	1–0	2022 FIFA World Cup qualification	Rakotoharimalala 2'	1,500	
11 November 2021	Stade de l'Amitié, Cotonou (A)	Benin	0–2	2022 FIFA World Cup qualification		15,000	
14 November 2021	Mahamasina Municipal Stadium, Antananarivo (H)	Tanzania	1–1	2022 FIFA World Cup qualification	Abdallah 74'	30,000	
1 June 2022	Cape Coast Sports Stadium, Cape Coast (A)	Ghana	0–3	2023 Africa Cup of Nations qualification			
5 June 2022	Mahamasina Municipal Stadium, Antananarivo (H)	Angola	1–1	2023 Africa Cup of Nations qualification	Rakotoharimalala 36'		
12 July 2022	King Zwelithini Stadium, Durban (N)	Namibia	0–2	2022 COSAFA Cup			
15 July 2022	Sugar Ray Xulu Stadium, Durban (N)	South Africa	1–2	2022 COSAFA Cup	Razafindranaivo 88' (pen.)		
21 September 2022	(A)	Morocco	0–1	Friendly			
24 September 2022	Stade El Bachir, Mohammedia (N)	Congo	3–3	Friendly	Voavy 28', Amada 56', Ilaimaharitra 86' (pen.)		
27 September 2022	Stade El Bachir, Mohammedia (N)	Benin	3–1	Friendly	Randriantsiferana 13', Donisa 62', Raveloson 83'		
23 March 2023	Mahamasina Municipal Stadium, Antananarivo (H)	Central African Republic	0–3	2023 Africa Cup of Nations qualification			
27 March 2023	Stade de la Réunification, Douala (N)	Central African Republic	0–2	2023 Africa Cup of Nations qualification			
18 June 2023	Mahamasina Municipal Stadium, Antananarivo (H)	Ghana	0–0	2023 Africa Cup of Nations qualification			
7 September 2023	Estádio Nacional da Tundavala, Lubango (A)	Angola	0–0	2023 Africa Cup of Nations qualification			
14 October 2023	El Bachir Stadium, Mohammedia (N)	Mauritania	1–2	Friendly	Randriantsiferana 90+1'		
17 October 2023	Larbi Zaouli Stadium, Casablanca (N)	Benin	2–1	Friendly	Razafindrasata 21', Razafindrakoto 51'		
17 November 2023	Baba Yara Stadium, Kumasi (A)	Ghana	0–1	2026 FIFA World Cup qualification		45,000	
20 November 2023	Honneur Stadium, Oujda (N)	Chad	3–0	2026 FIFA World Cup qualification	Rakotoharimalala 10', 84', Lapoussin 90+1'	3,000	
