= Coëtivy Airport =

Airport in Seychelles

- IATA: none; ICAO: FSSC

Summary
- Airport type: Private
- Serves: Coëtivy Island, Seychelles
- Elevation AMSL: 10 ft (3.0 m)
- Coordinates: 07°08′00″S 56°16′35″E

Map
- Location of airport in Seychelles

Runways
Direction	Length		Surface
Direction	m	ft	Surface
13/31	1,400	4,593	Concrete
- Source: WAD GCM Google Maps

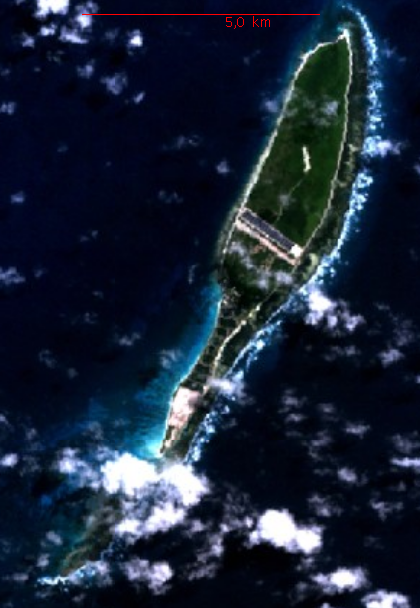
Coevity Airport

Coëtivy Airport (ICAO: FSSC) is an airport serving Coëtivy Island in the Seychelles. The island is 290 kilometres (180 mi) south-southeast of Victoria, capital of the Seychelles on Mahe Island. Along with Île Platte, the nearest neighbour 171 kilometres (106 mi) northwest, it comprises the Southern Coral Group of the Outer Islands.

The Coetivy non-directional beacon (Ident: COE) is located just south of the field.

== See also ==
- Transport in Seychelles
- List of airports in Seychelles
