= Bel Ombre =

Bel Ombre may refer to:

- Bel Ombre, Mauritius, a village in the district of Savanne, Mauritius
- Bel Ombre, Seychelles, an administrative district of Seychelles
