= Soleil Island =

Island in the Seychelles

Nickname: Ile Soleil
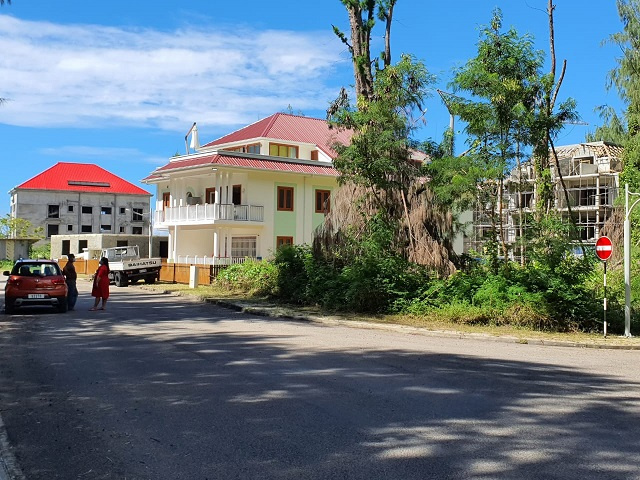

- Location within Seychelles

Geography
- Location: Seychelles, Indian Ocean
- Coordinates: 4°41′18″S 55°31′48″E
- Archipelago: Inner Islands, Seychelles
- Adjacent to: Indian Ocean
- Total islands: 1
- Major islands: Soleil
- Area: 0.136 km^{2} (0.053 sq mi)
- Length: 0.65 km (0.404 mi)
- Width: 0.25 km (0.155 mi)
- Coastline: 1.5 km (0.93 mi)
- Highest elevation: 3 m (10 ft)

Administration
- Seychelles
- Group: Granitic Seychelles
- Sub-Group: Mahe Islands
- Sub-Group: Anonyme Islands
- Districts: Anse-aux-Pins
- Largest settlement: Soleil camp (pop. 10)

Demographics
- Population: 10 (2014)
- Pop. density: 20/km^{2} (50/sq mi)
- Ethnic groups: Creole, French, East Africans, Indians.

Additional information
- Time zone: SCT (UTC+4)
- ISO code: SC-20
- Official website: www.ilesoleil.sc

Ile Soleil is a small artificial island (0.14 km^{2}) in the Seychelles, lying 50m off the east coast of Mahé, near the runway of the Seychelles International Airport.

== History ==
The island was reclaimed in 2008 after the Dubai Dredger finished its work in the Victoria Port islands. The local Anse-aux-Pins mayor decided he wanted an artificial island as well. There are plans to build a new terminal on the island, due to housing problems.

== Administration ==
The island belongs to Anse-aux-Pins District.

== Tourism ==
The future of the island is unclear, although it is proposed to have an oriental tourism industry.

== Demography ==
The island's southern part is the location of a new luxurious neighborhood.

== Transport ==
Soleil is linked to the mainland by a causeway.

== Image gallery ==
Map 1

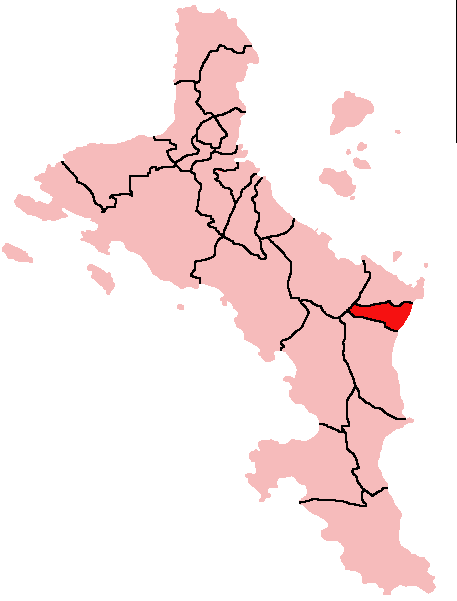
District Map
