= Yelvanny Rose =

Seychellois footballer

Personal information
- Full name: Yelvanny Salmyn Rose
- Date of birth: August 8, 1980 (age 46)
- Place of birth: Seychelles
- Position: Striker

Team information
- Current team: Anse Réunion FC

Senior career*
Years	Team	Apps	(Gls)
2002–2005	Anse Réunion		
2005	Long An	0	(0)
2005	→ QNK Quảng Nam (loan)		
2005–2011	Anse Réunion		(13)
2011	La Passe		(11)
2011– (Note: Statistics only known for 2023–24 and 2024–25.)	Anse Réunion	6+	(0+)

International career
2002–2007	Seychelles	17	(1)
- * Club domestic league appearances and goals

Yelvanny Salmyn Rose (born 8 August 1980) is a Seychellois footballer who plays as a striker for Seychelles First Division club Anse Réunion.

== Club career ==
=== Seychelles ===
More than a year after his spell in Vietnam, the then 26-year old shot the 2006 championship-winning goal for Anse Réunion, clinching the club's first league title in the process.

With La Passe FC in 2011, the forward hit a hat-trick against Northern Dynamo FC, taking his club to second place. He made five league appearances with the club in 2023–24, and one more appearance in 2024–25.

=== South Africa ===
Yelvanny tried out for Silver Stars in 2004 with the help of former Anse Reunion coach Walter da Silva.

=== Vietnam ===
Trying out with V.League 1 side Dong Tam Long An in winter 2004, Rose penned a deal with the club and was loaned to Vietnamese First Division team Quang Nam F.C. in early 2005. Four months later, the striker left Vietnam, often having contretemps with his teammates and aggrieved by the way the management did not honor the terms on his contract. In total, Rose started four times and was substituted on most occasions during his stint in there.
