= Tsiry Razafindrasata =

Malagasy footballer

Personal information
- Full name: Tsiry Mirado Anjaraniaina Razafindrasata
- Date of birth: 14 September 1995 (age 31)
- Place of birth: Sabotsy Namehana, Madagascar
- Height: 1.82 m (6 ft 0 in)
- Position: Midfielder

Team information
- Current team: JET Kintana

Senior career*
Years	Team	Apps	(Gls)
2014–2021	AS JET Mada		
2021–	JET Kintana		

International career
2019–2023	Madagascar	2	(1)
- * Club domestic league appearances and goals

Tsiry Razafindrasata (born 14 September 1995) is a Malagasy football midfielder who currently plays for JET Kintana.

== Career statistics ==
=== International ===
As of match played 17 October 2023

Appearances and goals by national team and year
National team	Year	Apps	Goals
Madagascar	2019	1	0
Madagascar	2020	0	0
Madagascar	2021	0	0
Madagascar	2022	0	0
Madagascar	2023	1	0
Total		2	1

As of match played 17 October 2023
Madagascar score listed first, score column indicates score after each Razafindrasata goal

List of international goals scored by Lalaïna Rafanomezantsoa
No.	Date	Venue	Cap	Opponent	Score	Result	Competition
1	17 October 2023	Larbi Zaouli Stadium, Casablanca, Morocco	2	Benin	1–1	2–1	Friendly
