= Tsito Razafindrasata =

Malagasy footballer

Personal information
- Full name: Tsito Miravo Nasandratra Razafindrasata
- Date of birth: 2 October 1996 (age 30)
- Position: Midfielder

Team information
- Current team: JET Kintana

Senior career*
Years	Team	Apps	(Gls)
2017–2021	AS JET Mada		
2021–	JET Kintana		

International career
2019–	Madagascar	10	(0)
- * Club domestic league appearances and goals

Tsito Razafindrasata (born 2 October 1996) is a Malagasy football midfielder who currently plays for JET Kintana.
