= Coëtivy Island =

Island in the Seychelles

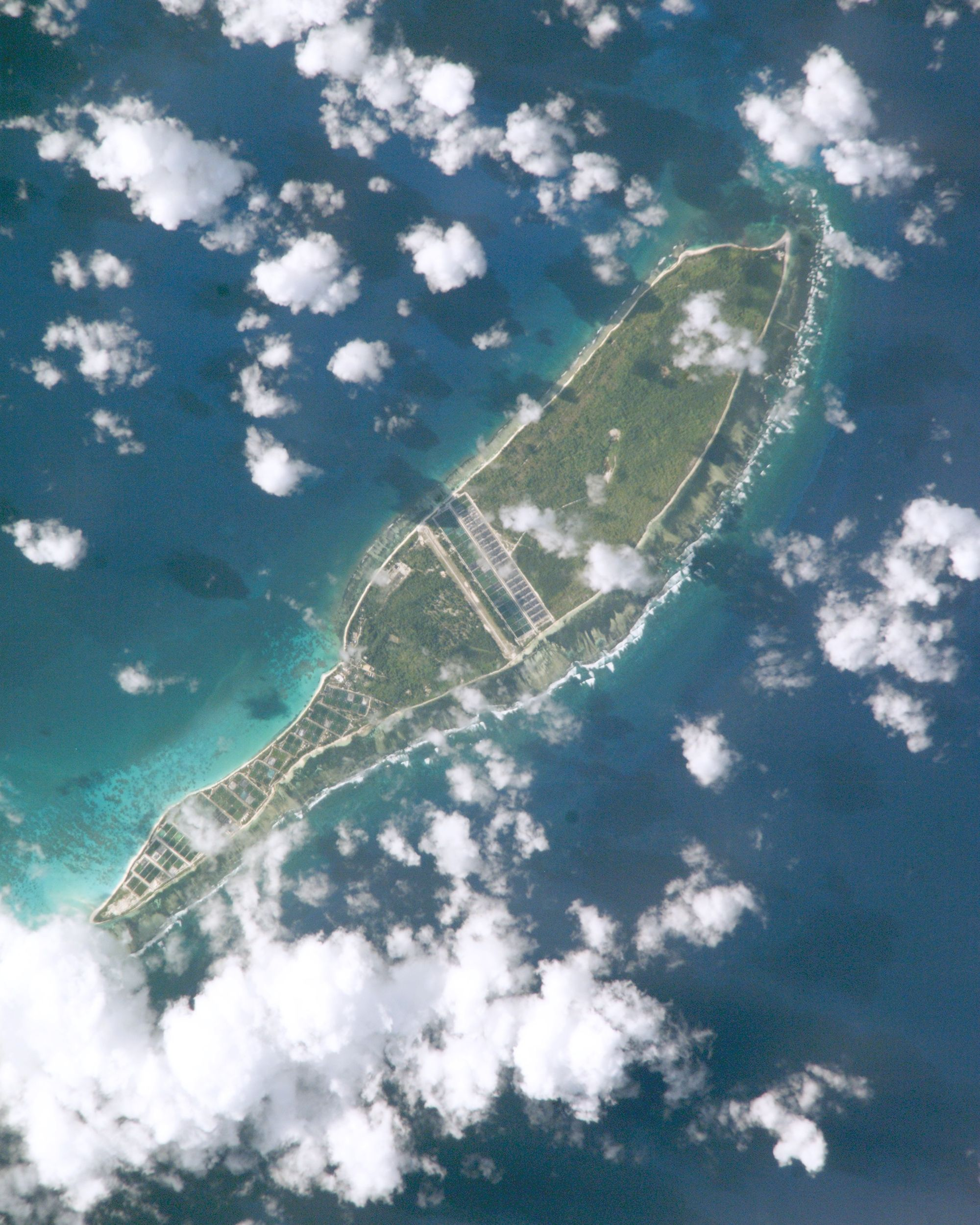
- Satellite image of Coëtivy Island

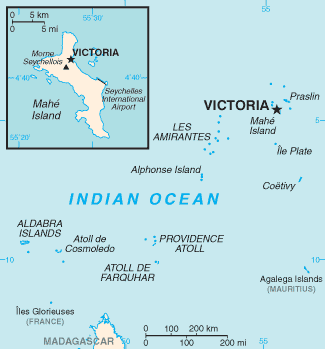
- Map of Seychelles, Coëtivy on the right

- Coëtivy Island in the Indian Ocean; the land at bottom left is the northern tip of Madagascar.

Geography
- Location: Indian Ocean
- Coordinates: 07°08′S 56°16′E
- Archipelago: Seychelles
- Adjacent to: Indian Ocean
- Total islands: 1
- Major islands: Coëtivy
- Area: 9.33 km^{2} (3.60 sq mi)
- Length: 9.5 km (5.9 mi)
- Width: 1.5 km (0.93 mi)
- Coastline: 20.4 km (12.68 mi)
- Highest elevation: 21 m (69 ft)

Administration
- Seychelles
- Group: Outer Islands
- Sub-Group: Southern Coral Group
- Districts: Outer Islands District
- Largest settlement: Coëtivy (pop. 260)

Demographics
- Population: 260 (2014)
- Pop. density: 27.9/km^{2} (72.3/sq mi)
- Ethnic groups: Creole, French, East Africans, Indians.

Additional information
- Time zone: SCT (UTC+4)
- ISO code: SC-26
- Official website: www.seychelles.travel/en/discover/the-islands/outer-islands

Coëtivy Island is a small coral island in the Seychelles 290 km (180 mi) south of Mahé, at 07°08′S 56°16′E.

Along with Île Platte, the nearest neighbor 171 km (106 mi) northwest, it comprises the Southern Coral Group and therefore belongs to the Outer Islands.

== History ==
It was named after Chevalier de Coëtivy, commander of the Ile de France who first sighted the island in 1771. In 1908 it was transferred from Mauritius to Seychelles. In 1970 the island was purchased by the parastatal Seychelles Marketing Board (SMB). In 1989, SMB began producing shrimp. Coëtivy Island became famous for its shrimp farms (black tiger prawn) and shrimp processing plant that operated on the island. Large scale production began in August 1992. However, in 2008, due to hard financial times, the plant closed. in 2009, the island became the site of an active prison (Ministry of Internal Affairs choice) for low security prisoners and a rehabilitation center for drug abusers. Visitation is strictly controlled and access is only possible by private airplane charter. By 2020, the Prison should be increased to capacity of 600 inmates. By 2020, the island is expected to have more residential apartments.

== Geography ==
The island has an area of 9.33 km^{2} (3.60 sq mi), is low and heavily wooded.

== Demographics ==
The island has a population of 260.

== Economy ==
The islanders are mostly farmers. They produce vegetables which are sold in markets on Mahé. The main production activities on the island include farming, livestock, charcoal production, salted fish production and coconut processing which include production of copra, pounac and coconut oil.

== Administration ==
The island belongs to Outer Islands District. Being an island with a small population, there are not any government buildings or services. For many services, people have to go to Victoria, which is a difficult task.

== Transport ==
The island is bisected by a 1,400 metres (4,600 ft) airfield that follows the long east–west axis. The island is occasionally serviced by an Island Development Company (IDC) aircraft from Mahé.

== Economics ==
The inhabitants on the island are engaged in very small scale farming and fishing which are mainly for the island consumption.

== Flora and fauna ==
The island is known for its rich fish life.

== Image gallery ==
Map 1

District map of the Outer Islands

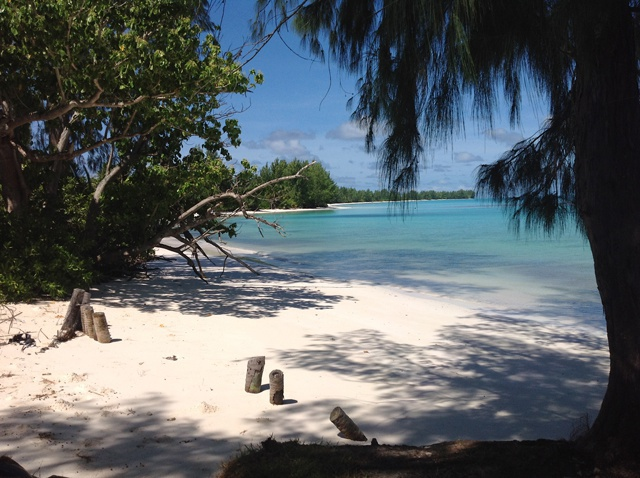
Coëtivy Island in the Outer Seychelles
