= Valéry Rakotoarinosy =

Malagasy footballer

Personal information
- Full name: Harimanana Solo Valéry Rakotoarinosy
- Date of birth: 9 April 1986 (age 40)
- Place of birth: Antananarivo, Madagascar
- Height: 1.70 m (5 ft 7 in)
- Position: Defender

Team information
- Current team: Disciples FC

Senior career*
Years	Team	Apps	(Gls)
2001–2002	DSA Antananarivo		
2003	FC Antsaniony		
2004–2010	AS Adema		
2011–2013	La Passe FC		
2014–2015	Northern Dynamo FC		
2016	AS Saint-Michel		
2017–2019	AS JET Mada		
2019–	Disciples FC		

International career
2009–2016	Madagascar	5	(0)
- * Club domestic league appearances and goals

Valéry Rakotoarinosy (born 9 April 1986) is a Malagasy football defender who currently plays for Disciples FC.
