= Ahmed Saeed (footballer, born 1989) =

Sudanese footballer

Personal information
- Full name: Ahmed Saeed Ahmed Awad Alla
- Date of birth: 13 December 1989 (age 36)
- Place of birth: El-Obeid, Sudan
- Height: 1.75 m (5 ft 9 in)
- Position: Forward

Team information
- Current team: Al-Quoz SC (Abu Hemed)
- Number: 17

Senior career*
Years	Team	Apps	(Gls)
2007–2009	Wadi Al-Nil SC (Khartoum)		
2010–2020	Al Ahli SC (Khartoum)		
2017–2018	Wad Hashem SC (Senar) (loan)		
2020–2022	Al-Ahly SC (Merowe)		
2022–2024	Al-Ahli SC (Wad Madani)		
2024-2025	Al-Huriya SC (Suluq)		
2025-2026	Dabarousa SC (Halfa Al-Jadida)		
2026-	Al-Quoz SC (Abu Hemed)		

International career^{‡}
2019–2021	Sudan	2	(0)
- * Club domestic league appearances and goals as of 25 August 2026 ‡ National team caps and goals as of 11 October 2021

Ahmed Saeed Ahmed Awad Alla (born 1 January 1989) is a Sudanese professional footballer who plays as a forward for Al-Ahly Merowe and the Sudan national football team.
