= Seychelles Marketing Board =

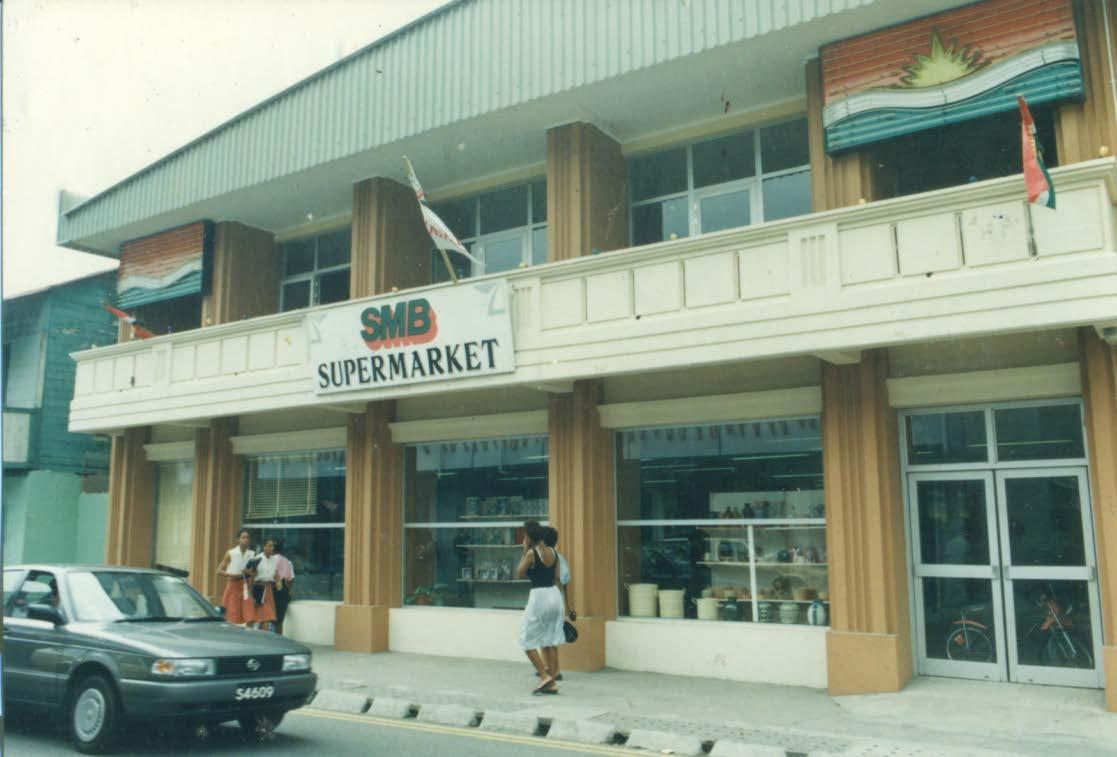
- One of the supermarkets by the Seychelles Marketing Board, built in 1984
- Industry: Retail; Import
- Founded: 1985; 40 years ago
- Defunct: 2008
- Fate: Majority of assets transferred to Seychelles Trading Company
- Headquarters: Victoria, Seychelles

Seychelles Marketing Board (SMB) was a government parastatal company based in Victoria, Seychelles. Since its formation in 1985, it dominated the importation of goods to Seychelles, particularly essential goods and was the main wholesaler of goods. SMB used to operate a large prawn farm on Coëtivy Island. In 2008 most of its assets were transferred to the Seychelles Trading Company (STC).

Until 2008 the football team now called Super Magic Brothers was called "Seychelles Marketing Board".
