= Matthew Rouillon =

Seychelles footballer

Personal information
- Date of birth: 17 February 2005 (age 21)
- Place of birth: Seychelles
- Position: Striker

Team information
- Current team: Rovers FC
- Number: 29

Youth career
- –2020: Futuro Sport Sesel

Senior career*
Years	Team	Apps	(Gls)
2020–	Rovers FC		

International career^{‡}
2021–	Seychelles	2	(0)
- * Club domestic league appearances and goals ‡ National team caps and goals as of 19:09, 10 February 2022 (UTC)

Matthew Rouillon (born 17 February 2005) is a Seychellois footballer who currently plays for Rovers FC and the Seychelles national team.

== Club career ==
As a youth Rouillon played for Futuro Sports Sesel. In preparation for the 2020 season, he scored three goals in two matches, including two against the U18 squad of Mont Fleuri FC and another against Plaisance FC. In 2020 he went on to join Rovers FC, the parent club of Futuro Sesel. In July 2022 Rouillon travelled to France for a trial with SC Air Bel in Marseille.

== International career ==
Rouillon was called up to the senior national team for a friendly tournament in Comoros in September 2021. At age 16 he went on to make his senior international debut on 1 September 2021 in the Seychelles' opening loss to Comoros.

=== International career statistics ===
As of match played 4 September 2021

Seychelles national team
Year	Apps	Goals
2021	2	0
2022	0	0
Total	2	0
