= Clifford Andre =

Seychellois politician and sailor

- Occupations: Politician, Marine Captain, lawyer

Clifford Andre is a member of the National Assembly of Seychelles. A lawyer and marine captain by profession, he is a member of the Seychelles People's Progressive Front, and was first elected to the Assembly in 2007.
