= Al Ahli Club (Merowe) =

Sudanese football club

Al-Ahly SC Merowe
- Full name: Al Ahly Sports Club Merowe
- Founded: 1956; 70 years ago
- Ground: Merowe Stadium; Merowe, Northern State, Sudan
- Capacity: 1,000
- Chairman: Adham Abdelelah
- Manager: Ayman Damba
- League: Sudan Premier League

Al Ahli Club (Arabic: النادي الأهلي الرياضي) also known as Al Ahli Merowe, is a football club based in Merowe, Sudan. In 2021, the club played in the CAF Conderation Cup for the first time in the club's history.

== History ==
In 2021, Al Ahli Merowe qualified for the 2021–22 CAF Confederation Cup after winning the 2021 Sudanese Cup. In their first round match against South Sudan club Atlabara, they won by 4–0 on aggregate. They however lost their second round match first leg match Kenyan club Gor Mahia by 3–1 and later withdrew from the competition, causing Gor Mahia to qualify to the next stage.
