= Mohammed Alhassan =

Ghanaian footballer

Personal information
- Date of birth: 9 January 1984 (age 42)
- Place of birth: Tema, Ghana
- Position: Goalkeeper

Team information
- Current team: New York Clarkstown SC Eagles
- Number: 1

Youth career
- –2003: Asante Kotoko

Senior career*
Years	Team	Apps	(Gls)
2004–2008	Asante Kotoko		
2008	Kessben F.C.		
2009	Clarkstown Soccer Club		
- * Club domestic league appearances and goals ‡ National team caps and goals as of 30 May 2008

Mohammed Alhassan (born 9 January 1984) is a Ghanaian footballer. He currently plays for Eleven Wise.

== Career ==
Alhassan was the Second choice keeper for Asante Kotoko who caused much consternation when he chose to sign for Asante Kotoko ahead of their great rivals Hearts of Oak. In July 2008 he moved from Asante Kotoko to Kessben F.C. included teammate Michael Ofosu-Appiah, after 6 months left the club from Prempeh and signs a contract by Eleven Wise.

== International ==
He was part of the Ghanaian 2004 Olympic football team, but didn't play in the tournament.
