= Rovers FC (Seychelles) =

- Full name: Rovers Football Club
- Nickname: Rovers
- Short name: RFC
- Founded: 2018; 8 years ago
- Ground: Stade Linité; Mahe, Seychelles
- Capacity: 10,000
- Coordinates: 4°38′7.84″S 55°28′13.66″E
- President: Kosta Todorovic
- Sporting director: Milan Blaga
- Coach: Michel Renaud
- League: Seychelles Premier League
- Website: https://roversfc.sc
Home colours	Away colours	Third colours

Rovers FC is a Seychellois association football club based in Cascade that currently competes in the Seychelles Premier League. The current head coach is Michel Renaud.

== History ==
Rovers FC was founded in 2018 and began playing in the Seychelles 3rd Division. The club was the champions of the 2nd Division and earned promotion to the 1st Division, the second-tier league of football in the Seychelles, following the 2019–2020 season.

In November 2020 it was announced that Rovers FC had signed a major 2-year sponsorship deal with the Absa Group.

== Honours ==
- Seychelles Championship 2
  - Winners: 2020
- Seychelles FA Cup
  - Semi-finalists: 2020

== Current players ==
Note: Flags indicate national team as defined under FIFA eligibility rules; some limited exceptions apply. Players may hold more than one non-FIFA nationality.

No.	Pos.	Nation	Player
1	GK	SEY	Rohan Orphe
28	GK	SEY	Adrian Clarisse
31	GK	SEY	Kim Hoareau
20	DF	SEY	Norvil Gaspard (team captain)
23	DF	SEY	Remy De Ketelaere
5	DF	SEY	Curtis Bellard
4	DF	TAN	Benedict Musunga
22	DF	SEY	Christiano Louis
14	DF	SEY	Verron Harrison
3	DF	SEY	Oneil Pointe
6	DF	SEY	Santosh Albert
24	DF	SEY	Kevin Joubert
2	DF	SEY	Kevin Radegonde

No.	Pos.	Nation	Player
8	MF	SEY	Lucas Panayi
13	MF	SEY	Abdul Jumaye
19	MF	SEY	Jude Volcere
26	MF	SEY	Pharel Labiche
19	MF	SEY	Tarick Maringo
17	MF	SEY	Mike Etienne
32	MF	SEY	Sa-heed Victor
27	FW	SEY	Dwane Dodo
28	FW	SEY	Monard Howard
33	FW	SEY	Shane Philo
9	FW	SEY	Shuaib Ernesta
25	FW	GAM	Musa Njie
10	FW	SEY	Rhio Damoo
29	FW	SEY	Matthew Rouillon
