= Île Platte =

Island in Seychelles

Platte Island
Nickname: Île Platte
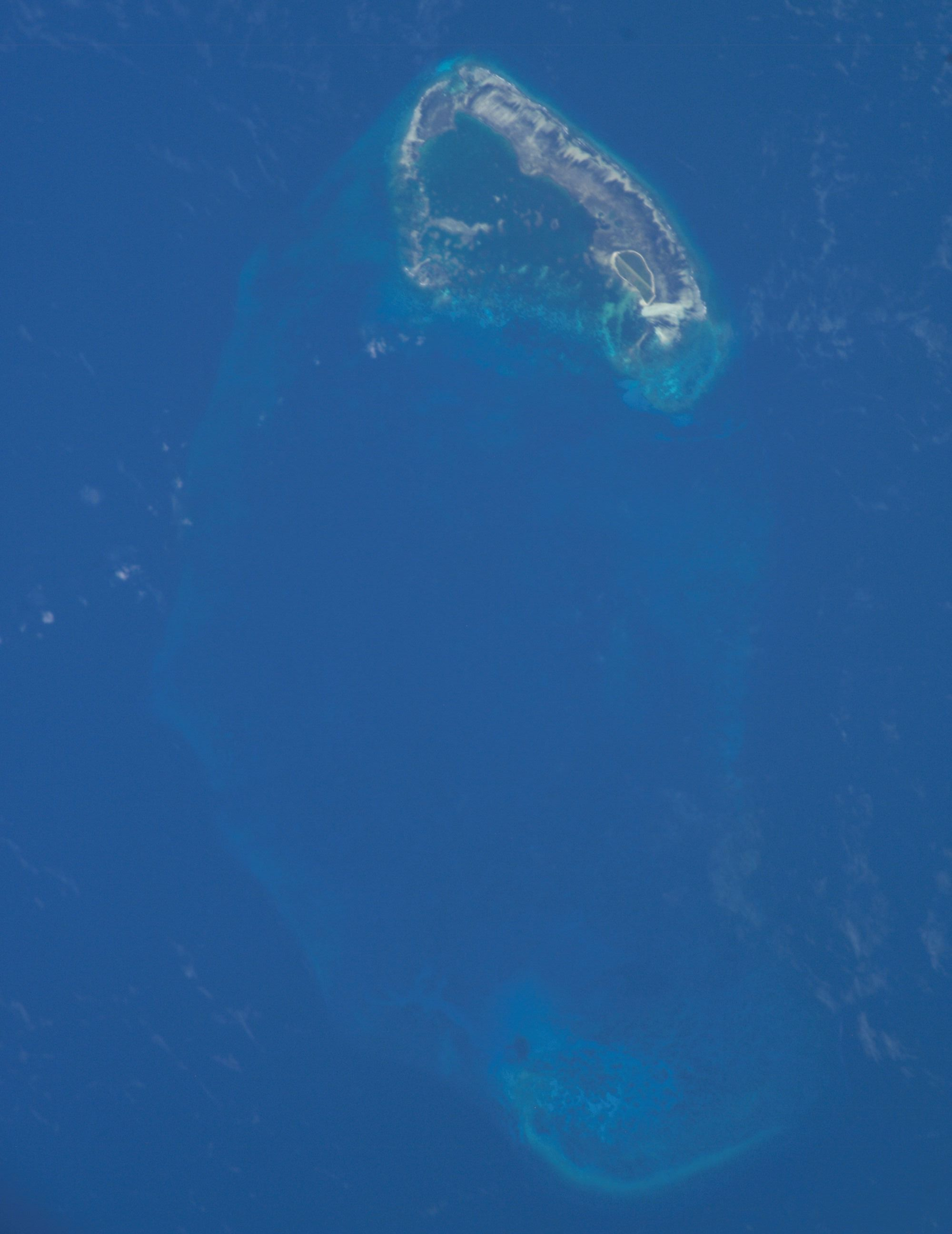
- Satellite image of Platte Island

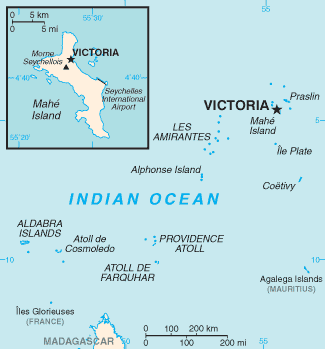
- Map of Seychelles, Île Platte on the right

- Location within Seychelles

Geography
- Location: Indian Ocean
- Coordinates: 05°52′S 55°24′E
- Archipelago: Seychelles
- Adjacent to: Indian Ocean
- Total islands: 1
- Major islands: Platte
- Area: 0.578 km^{2} (0.223 sq mi)
- Length: 1.3 km (0.81 mi)
- Width: 0.55 km (0.342 mi)
- Coastline: 3.3 km (2.05 mi)

Administration
- Seychelles
- Group: Outer Islands
- Sub-Group: Southern Coral Group
- Districts: Outer Islands District
- Largest settlement: Platte (pop. 3)

Demographics
- Population: 3 (2014)
- Pop. density: 5.2/km^{2} (13.5/sq mi)
- Ethnic groups: Creole, French, East Africans, Indians.

Additional information
- Time zone: SCT (UTC+4)
- ISO code: SC-26
- Official website: www.seychelles.travel/en/discover/the-islands/outer-islands

Platte Island or Île Platte is an island in the Southern Coral Group that is part of the Outer Islands of the Seychelles.

== Geography ==
The island is located south of the Seychelles Bank at 05°52′S 55°24′E. Coëtivy Island (also Southern Coral Group) lies 171 kilometres (106 mi) further southeast. Platte Island is located 130 kilometres (81 mi) south of Mahé, the main island of the Seychelles, and 140 kilometres (87 mi) from their capital Victoria.

The island, a low and wooded sand cay, ranges about 1,300 metres (4,300 ft) from north to south, with a width from 250 metres (820 ft) in the south to 550 metres (1,800 ft) in the north and a land area of 0.578 square kilometres (0.223 mi^{2}). Its height is 3 m above the sea level.

== History ==
Platte was discovered and named in 1769 for its low topography by Lieutenant de Lampériaire of La Curieuse. And it also known by its nickname "ill Pllate".

In the 1840s there was sufficient guano on the island to make it worthwhile excavating, and it was still won in the 20th century. A visitor in 1905 stated that 1500 tons had been taken off the island the month before he arrived. He also reported on the island's "beautiful plantation of coconuts which yields about 20,000 a month," the fine condition of the palms presumably due to the guano rich soil. The island was not always so productive. In 1864 the Great Britain Civil Commissioner complained that "despite 18 years' occupation only 17 coconut trees have been planted".

In 1828, Platte was proposed as a suitable location for an isolation camp for people with leprosy, but in 1838 the island was taken over by the British administration for use as a quarantine station for visiting ships instead. It did not prove entirely satisfactory. Being at some distance from authority, the crews of the ships, in particular the whalers, tended to amok, causing "depredations". By 1864, the civil commissioner had further complaints about the use of Platte as a quarantine island. He did not think it "of much potential utility because it is 71 miles from Mahé and vessels of 500 tons burden cannot approach nearer than 5 miles because of the dangerous reef. Also during the SE monsoon it is almost inaccessible to any vessel". He was dubious as to the possibility of building any infrastructure on the island because "an erection on Flat Island would be...expensive – it is entirely coral with no timber, trees having been removed to plant coconuts...The only house is a hut constructed of leaves. No provisions except for fish are available. There is sufficient dead wood to burn lime and there is coral for building but all labourers and rations would have to come from Mahé at great expense". He noted that the last time a ship was put in quarantine, Long Island was actually used, but his preference was to use Moyenne Island as the quarantine station.

=== Coral reefs ===
Barrier reefs, over which the sea breaks heavily, extend 5 kilometres (3.1 mi) north, 0.8 kilometres (0.50 mi) east, and 2.4 kilometres (1.5 mi) south of the island, making it a pseudo-atoll. Within the barrier reefs, the lagoon is quite smooth, and landing is safe and easy.

A submerged coral reef rim extends 12 kilometres (7.5 mi) west and 18 kilometres (11 mi) south of the island, obviously the remnants of a sunken atoll, creating a complex of almost 25 kilometres (16 mi) in length north–south and 14 kilometres (8.7 mi) in width east–west and covering an area of roughly 270 km^{2}.

There are two tricky passages through the reef on the northwest side, available only for small vessels with local knowledge only. La Perle Reef lies at the southwestern end of the reef rim, about 10 kilometres (6.2 mi) southwest of Platte Island. Depths of less than 4 metres (13 ft) can exist on this reef where breakers have been observed.

== Demographics ==
Platte Island in Seychelles is largely occupied by the Waldorf Astoria Resorts and Hotel, making it an exclusive and private destination. The island's population is small, with most permanent residents being staff and management employed by the hotel. A small settlement is located on the western shore, home to the manager's house and the Island Development Company.

== Administration ==
Platte island is administered by the Island Development Company (IDC). Due to its small population, there are no government buildings or services. The majority of the island is occupied by Waldorf Astoria Hotels and Resorts.

== Transport ==
Platte island is bisected by a 1000 m airfield that follows the long north–south axis, 23 m wide east–west, and 3 m above the sea level. The island is a 25-minute flight from Seychelles International Airport.

== Economics ==
The economy of Platte Island in Seychelles is primarily driven by the presence of the Waldorf Astoria Hotels and Resorts. The resort plays a critical role in the local economy by employing Seychellois workers in various roles, from hospitality services to management and maintenance. It also supports sustainable tourism initiatives, ensuring that the resort's operations benefit both the local community and the environment. Other economic activities on the island include small-scale operations related to the resort, such as supply and transport services, as well as the management of the Island Development Company, which oversees infrastructure and development.

== Flora and fauna ==
The island is known for its diverse wildlife and rich marine life. The red-footed booby and sooty tern used to breed there but are now extinct in the area. The brown noddy and white-tailed tropicbird still breed while hundreds of lesser noddies and bridled terns roost at night. Barn-owls were introduced in 1949 but died out in 1951–1952. The red fody also breeds on the island. The surrounding waters act as a nursery for juvenile marine species, including Hawksbill and Green Turtles, Lemon and Blacktip sharks, Eagle Rays, and a diverse range of fish.

A year-long turtle study conducted in 1998 demonstrated that Platte has significant populations of some 40 female hawksbill sea turtles nesting annually. Island Conservation Society still actively monitor the presence of nesting turtles on the island.

== Image gallery ==
Map 1

District map of the Outer Islands

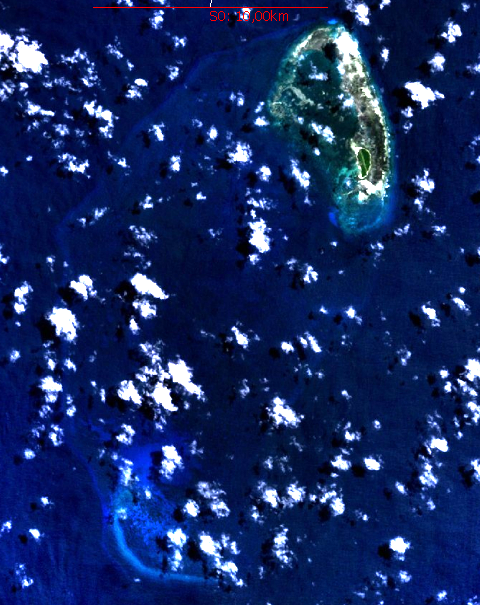
NASA image of Île Platte—Platte Island with surrounding reefs

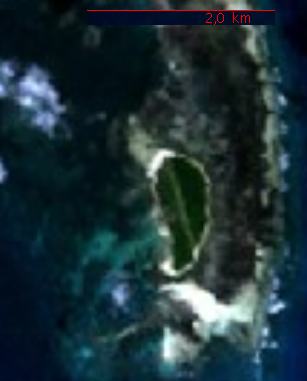
NASA image of Platte Island.
