= Celimpilo Ngema =

South African soccer player

Personal information
- Date of birth: 12 September 1997 (age 29)
- Place of birth: Melmoth, South Africa
- Position: Midfielder

Team information
- Current team: AmaZulu
- Number: 20

Senior career*
Years	Team	Apps	(Gls)
2017–2020	Uthongathi	99	(28)
2020–2023	TTM/Marumo Gallants	80	(3)
2023–	AmaZulu	24	(1)
- * Club domestic league appearances and goals as of 19 August 2024

Celimpilo Ngema (born 12 September 1997) is a South African soccer player who plays as a midfielder for AmaZulu in the South African Premier Division.

He was born in Melmoth. He was on the Uthongathi team that won promotion from the 2016–17 SAFA Second Division. Ngema also received a Player of the Tournament as well as a Young Player of the Tournament award. The club aimed to fight for promotion from the National First Division. He was on trial with Chippa United in the winter of 2019, and by the 2019–20 season, Ngema was considered Uthongathi's star player.

Ngema left Uthongathi in 2020. As Chippa United reportedly made a R150,000 bid, the deal was not finalized, and Tshakhuma Tsha Madzivhandila (TTM) bought Ngema instead. With TTM, Ngema helped win the 2020–21 Nedbank Cup, and proceeded to lose the 2021–22 Nedbank Cup final. He remained in the squad after the club license was purchased by Marumo Gallants, and played the 2021–22 and 2022-23 CAF Confederation Cup for Gallants, scoring several goals.

With half a year left of his contract, Ngema was reported to have signed a "pre-contract" with AmaZulu during the winter of 2023. There were still rumours of a transfer to other clubs. Marumo Gallants also ended up being relegated from the 2022-23 South African Premier Division, though Ngema was crowned as Player of the Year in the club's internal end-season gala. The move to AmaZulu went through in the summer of 2023. Ngema and the club notably had a slow start to the 2023-24 South African Premier Division.
