= Southern Coral Group =

Islands in the Seychelles

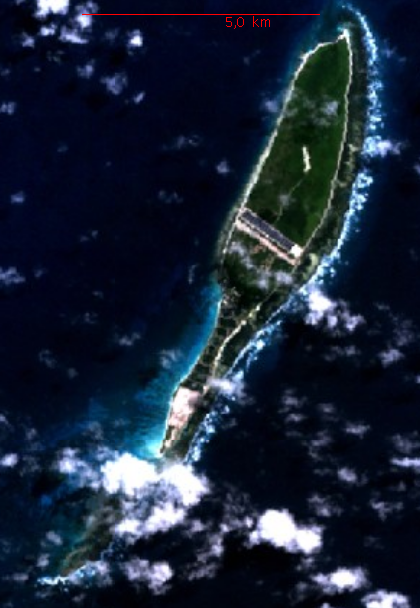
- Coëtivy Island. NASA Image

- Location within Seychelles

Geography
- Location: Indian Ocean
- Coordinates: 06°30′S 55°44′E
- Archipelago: Seychelles
- Adjacent to: Indian Ocean
- Total islands: 2
- Major islands: Coëtivy; Île Platte
- Area: 9.908 km^{2} (3.826 sq mi)
- Highest elevation: 21 m (69 ft)
- Highest point: Coëtivy

Administration
- Seychelles
- Group: Outer Islands
- Sub-Group: Southern Coral Group
- Districts: Outer Islands District
- Largest settlement: Coëtivy (pop. 260)

Demographics
- Population: 263 (2014)
- Pop. density: 26.5/km^{2} (68.6/sq mi)
- Ethnic groups: Creole, French, East Africans, Indians.

Additional information
- Time zone: SCT (UTC+4)
- ISO code: SC-26
- Official website: www.seychelles.travel/en/discover/the-islands/outer-islands

Southern Coral Group is a collective term for two islands of Outer Islands of the Seychelles, lying in the south of the island nation, between 135 and 300 kilometers south of the capital, Victoria, on Mahé Island.

== Islands ==
Two widely separated islands, with a distance of 171 km from one another, make up the Southern Coral Group. They are both sand cays, situated on the northeastern sides of pseudo-atolls:

1. Île Platte in the north
2. Coëtivy Island in the southeast

== Population ==
Both islands are inhabited. The main settlement is on Coëtivy Island.
