= Abubakar Adamu =

Nigerian general (born 1966)

Major General Abubakar Adamu
- Adamu in 2022

Commander Nigerian Army Cyber Warfare Command
- In office July 2022 – June 2023

Personal details
- Born: 11 September 1966 (age 60) Gembu, Northern Region, Nigeria (now in Taraba State, Nigeria)
- Education: Nigerian Defence Academy

Military service
- Allegiance: Nigeria
- Branch/service: Nigerian Army
- Years of service: 1985–2023
- Rank: Major general
- Battles/wars: Sierra Leone Civil War; Liberian Civil War; Second Congo War; Boko Haram insurgency 2015 West African offensive

Abubakar Adamu (born 11 September 1966) is a retired major general of the Nigerian Army and the former Commander of Nigeria Army Cyber Warfare Command (NACWC) of Nigeria, appointed after his promotion from Brigadier general to Major general while he was the third acting commander of the NACWC.
