= Asrat Tunjo =

Ethiopian footballer

Personal information
- Full name: Asrat Tunjo Toylo
- Date of birth: 29 November 1996 (age 29)
- Place of birth: Sabata, Ethiopia
- Positions: Defender; midfielder

Team information
- Current team: Dire Dawa City
- Number: 11

Senior career*
Years	Team	Apps	(Gls)
2012–2015	Federal Police		
2015–2017	Jimma Aba Jifar		
2017–2024	Ethiopian Coffee	80	(6)
2024–	Dire Dawa City	13	(1)

International career^{‡}
2021–	Ethiopia	21	(0)
- * Club domestic league appearances and goals as of 20:00, 14 January 2025 (UTC) ‡ National team caps and goals as of 20:00, 27 March 2023 (UTC)

Asrat Tunjo Toylo (Amharic: አሥራት ቱንጆ; born 29 November 1996) is an Ethiopian professional footballer who plays as a defender for Ethiopian Premier League club Dire Dawa City and the Ethiopia national team.

== Club career ==
In the summer of 2017, Tunjo signed with Ethiopian Coffee after leaving his former club Jimma Aba Jifar F.C. In 2019, Tunjo had a verbal agreement to join newly promoted side Sebeta City before contract negotiations broke off. He ultimately chose to resign with Ethiopian Coffee. Tunjo has been utilized in multiple positions during his time at Ethiopian Coffee.
