= Denis Rukundo =

Rwandan footballer (born 1996)

Personal information
- Date of birth: 12 December 1996 (age 29)
- Place of birth: Kampala, Uganda
- Height: 1.71 m (5 ft 7 in)
- Position: Right-back

Team information
- Current team: Police FC
- Number: 2

Senior career*
Years	Team	Apps	(Gls)
2014–2016	Maroons		
2016–2017	KCCA FC		
2017–2019	APR F.C.		
2019–	Police FC		

International career^{‡}
2021–	Rwanda	1	(0)
- * Club domestic league appearances and goals as of 21:40, 5 June 2021 (UTC) ‡ National team caps and goals as of 21:40, 5 June 2021 (UTC)

Denis Rukundo (born 12 December 1996) is a Rwandan professional footballer who plays as a midfielder for Police FC and the Rwanda national team.

== Professional career ==
Rukundo began his career in his native Uganda with Maroons FC and KCCA FC, before moving to Uganda with APR F.C. in 2017. On 20 August 2019, he returned to Uganda signing a contract with Police FC.

== International career ==
Rukundo was born in Uganda to a Rwandan father and Ugandan mother. He was called up to represent the Rwanda national team for a pair of friendlies in June 2021. He debuted with Rwanda in a friendly 2–0 win over Central African Republic on 3 June 2021.
