= The Lions FC =

Lions
- Full name: The Lions FC
- Ground: Stade Linité, Seychelles
- Capacity: 10,000
- Manager: Davis Khan
- League: Seychelles Second League
- 2019: unknown

The Lions FC is a Seychelles-based football club, currently playing in the Seychelles Second League.

== History ==
The team is based in Cascade, Seychelles in Mahe island but is made up of players from around the main island. Currently, the team plays at the 10,000 capacity Stade Linité.

In 2010, the Lions finished second in the Second Division and were promoted to the top division in the following season. The club made their debut in the top division in 2011, but finished in 10th place and were relegated to the Second Division. The club won the Second Division in the 2012 season, and has been playing in the First Division of the National Championship since 2013. Their best result in the top division was a 6th place finish in the 2015 season. Other achievements include winning the Second Division Cup in 2012, and reaching the final of the same tournament in 2007, 2009 and 2010.
