= St Roch United FC =

St Roch United
- Full name: St Roch United FC
- Ground: Stade Linité, Seychelles
- League: Seychelles League
- 2013: 10th

St Roch United FC is a Seychelles based football club, they are playing in the Seychelles League.

The team is based in Bel Ombre, Seychelles in Mahe island.

== Stadium ==
Currently, the team plays at the 10,000 capacity Stade Linité.
