= Super Magic Brothers =

Football club in the Seychelles

SMB
- Full name: Super Magic Brothers
- Founded: 1985
- Ground: People's Stadium; Victoria, Seychelles
- Capacity: 7,000
- Manager: George Toussaint
- League: Seychelles League
Home colours

Super Magic Brothers is a football club based in Victoria, Seychelles. Until 2008, the team was called Seychelles Marketing Board (the name of a government parastatal company). They were relegated to the 2nd Division in November 2009.

== Performance in CAF competitions ==
- CAF Confederation Cup: 1 appearance

2006 – Preliminary Round

== Current squad ==
Note: Flags indicate national team as defined under FIFA eligibility rules; some limited exceptions apply. Players may hold more than one non-FIFA nationality.

No.	Pos.	Nation	Player
—	FW	SEY	Che Dorasamy
—	FW	SEY	Stephen Leon
—	FW	SEY	Terence Kilindo
