= Bel Ombre, Seychelles =

Coordinates: 4°37′S 55°24′E

Bel Ombre
- District

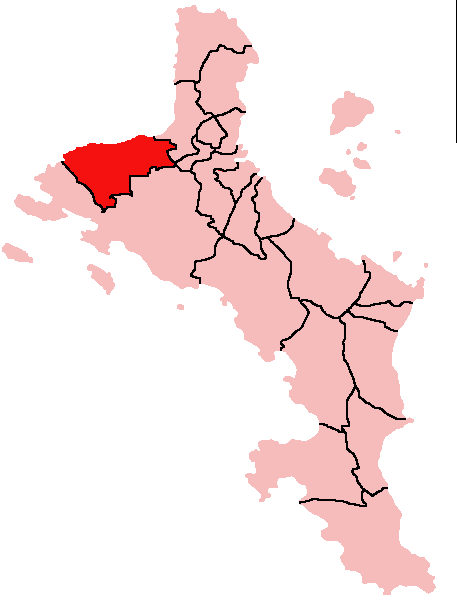
- Location within Mahé Island, Seychelles
- Country: Seychelles

Government
  - District Administrator: Sheryl Louise
  - Member of National Assembly: Hon. Nicholas Prea (LDS)

Population (2019 Estimate)
  - Total: 3,996
- Time zone: Seychelles Time

Bel Ombre (French pronunciation: [bɛl ɔ̃bʁ], or Belombre) is an administrative district of Seychelles located on the island of Mahé. It has a small fishing harbour for artesan fishing from small boats with lines.
