= St Francis FC (Seychelles) =

St Francis
- Full name: St Francis FC (Seychelles)
- Ground: Stade Linité, Seychelles
- Capacity: 10,000
- League: Seychelles League
- 2014: 10th (Relegated)

St Francis FC (Seychelles) is a Seychelles-based football club which plays in the Seychelles League. The team is based in Baie Lazare on Mahe island.

== Stadium ==
Currently, the team plays at the 10,000 capacity Stade Linité.
