= JET Kintana =

- Full name: Jeune Etoile de Tana Kintana
- Founded: 2021
- Ground: Stade François Razakinandretsianaina
- Capacity: 3,000
- Chairman: Hervé Rajaonaribololona
- Manager: Gervais Rakotodriantsenaina
- League: Malagasy Pro League

Jeune Etoile de Tana Kintana, known as JET Kintana is a Malagasy football club from Itasy

It was founded in January 2021 as a merger between top-flight team AS JET Mada and Kintana FC. French manager Nicolas Santucci was lured out of retirement and hired as the manager.
