= Cascade, Seychelles =

Coordinates: 4°40′S 55°29′E

Cascade
- District

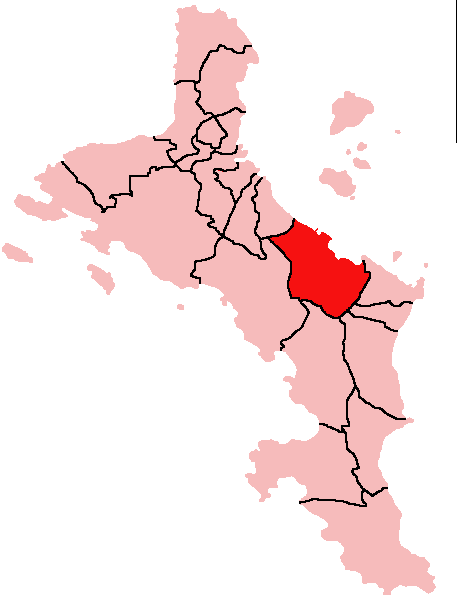
- Location within Mahé Island, Seychelles
- Country: Seychelles

Government
  - District Administrator: Lilian Biong
  - Member of National Assembly: Hon. Philip Monthy (LDS)

Population (2019 Estimate)
  - Total: 3,810
- Time zone: Seychelles Time

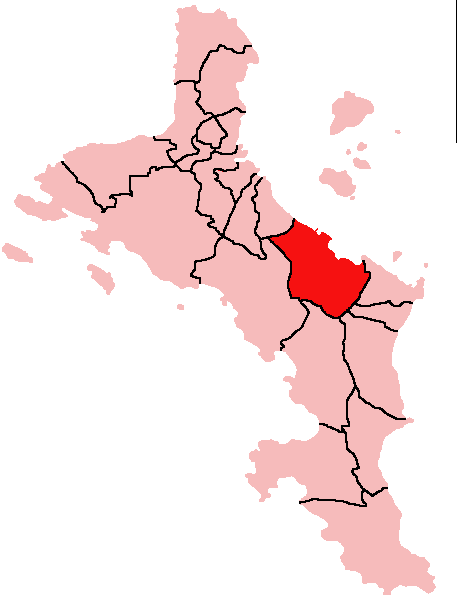
Location of Cascade District on Mahé Island, Seychelles

Cascade (French pronunciation: [kaskad]) is an administrative district of Seychelles located on the island of Mahé.
