= 2022 in association football =

The following are the scheduled events of association football for the calendar year 2022 throughout the world. This includes the following:

- In countries whose league seasons fall within a single calendar year, the 2022 season.
- In countries which crown one champion in a season that spans two calendar years, the 2021–22 season.
- In countries which split their league season into two championships, a system often known in Latin America as Apertura and Clausura, all championships awarded in calendar 2022.

== Events ==
=== Men's national teams ===
==== FIFA ====
- 20 November – 18 December: 2022 FIFA World Cup in Qatar
  - (gold) : Argentina
  - (silver) : France
  - (bronze) : Croatia
  - 4th: Morocco
- 1 June: 2022 Finalissima in England
  - (gold) : Argentina
  - (silver) : Italy

==== AFC ====
- 6–22 May: Football at the 2021 Southeast Asian Games in Vietnam
  - (gold) : Vietnam
  - (silver) : Thailand
  - (bronze) : Indonesia
  - 4th: Malaysia
- 1–19 June: 2022 AFC U-23 Asian Cup in Uzbekistan
  - (gold) : Saudi Arabia
  - (silver) : Uzbekistan
  - (bronze) : Japan
  - 4th: Australia
- 25 September – 20 October: 2022 AFC Futsal Asian Cup in Kuwait
  - (gold) : Japan
  - (silver) : Iran
  - (bronze) : Uzbekistan
  - 4th: Thailand

===== AFF =====
- 14–26 February: 2022 AFF U-23 Championship in Cambodia
  - (gold) : Vietnam
  - (silver) : Thailand
  - (bronze) : Timor-Leste
  - 4th: Laos
- 2–11 April: 2022 AFF Futsal Championship in Thailand
  - (gold) : Thailand
  - (silver) : Indonesia
  - (bronze) : Vietnam
  - 4th: Myanmar
- 2–15 July: 2022 AFF U-19 Youth Championship in Indonesia
  - (gold) : Malaysia
  - (silver) : Laos
  - (bronze) : Vietnam
  - 4th: Thailand
- 31 July – 12 August: 2022 AFF U-16 Youth Championship in Indonesia
  - (gold) : Indonesia
  - (silver) : Vietnam
  - (bronze) : Thailand
  - 4th: Myanmar

===== CAFA =====
- 12–19 February: 2022 CAFA U-19 Futsal Championship in Kyrgyzstan
  - (gold) : Iran
  - (silver) : Afghanistan
  - (bronze) : Kyrgyzstan
  - 4th: Uzbekistan
- 11–20 May: 2022 CAFA U-16 Championship in Tajikistan
  - (gold) : Iran
  - (silver) : Uzbekistan
  - (bronze) : Tajikistan
  - 4th: Afghanistan

===== EAFF =====
- 19–27 July: 2022 EAFF E-1 Football Championship in Japan
  - (gold) : Japan
  - (silver) : South Korea
  - (bronze) : China
  - 4th: Hong Kong

===== SAFF =====
- 25 July – 5 August: 2022 SAFF U-20 Championship in India
  - (gold) : India
  - (silver) : Bangladesh
  - (bronze) : Nepal
  - 4th: Maldives
- 5–14 September: 2022 SAFF U-17 Championship in Sri Lanka
  - (gold) : India
  - (silver) : Nepal
  - (bronze) : Bangladesh
  - (bronze) : Sri Lanka

===== WAFF =====
- 21 – 30 June: 2022 WAFF U-16 Championship in Jordan
  - (gold) : Jordan
  - (silver) : Lebanon
  - (bronze) : Iraq
  - (bronze) : Syria
- 4 – 13 June: 2022 WAFF Futsal Championship in Kuwait
  - (gold) : Kuwait
  - (silver) : Saudi Arabia
  - (bronze) : Oman
  - 4th: Lebanon

==== UAFA ====
- 20 – 28 June: 2022 Arab Futsal Cup in Saudi Arabia
  - (gold) : Morocco
  - (silver) : Iraq
  - (bronze) : Kuwait
  - 4th: Egypt
- 20 July – 7 August: 2022 Arab Cup U-20 in Saudi Arabia
  - (gold) : Saudi Arabia
  - (silver) : Egypt
  - (bronze) : Palestine
  - (bronze) : Algeria
- 23 August – 8 September: 2022 Arab Cup U-17 in Algeria
  - (gold) : Algeria
  - (silver) : Morocco
  - (bronze) : Saudi Arabia
  - (bronze) : Yemen

==== CAF ====
- 9 January – 6 February: 2021 Africa Cup of Nations in Cameroon
  - (gold) : Senegal
  - (silver) : Egypt
  - (bronze) : Cameroon
  - 4th: Burkina Faso
- 21–28 October: 2022 Africa Beach Soccer Cup of Nations in Mozambique
  - (gold) : Senegal
  - (silver) : Egypt
  - (bronze) : Morocco
  - 4th: Mozambique

===== UNAF =====
- 14 – 22 March: 2022 UNAF U-16 Tournament in Algeria
  - (gold) : Egypt
  - (silver) : Morocco
  - (bronze) : Tunisia
  - 4th: Algeria

===== COSAFA =====
- 5–17 July: 2022 COSAFA Cup in South Africa
  - (gold) : Zambia
  - (silver) : Namibia
  - (bronze) : Senegal
  - 4th: Mozambique

==== CONCACAF ====
- 18 June – 3 July: 2022 CONCACAF U-20 Championship in Honduras
  - (gold) : United States
  - (silver) : Dominican Republic
  - (bronze) : Honduras
  - (bronze) : Guatemala

==== OFC ====
- 7 – 24 September: 2022 OFC U-19 Championship in Tahiti
  - (gold) : New Zealand
  - (silver) : Fiji
  - (bronze) : New Caledonia
  - 4th: Tahiti
- 13 – 18 September: 2022 OFC Futsal Cup in Fiji
  - (gold) : New Zealand
  - (silver) : Solomon Islands
  - (bronze) : New Caledonia
  - 4th: FFA President's Five

==== UEFA ====
- 19 January – 6 February: UEFA Futsal Euro 2022 in Netherlands
  - (gold) : Portugal
  - (silver) : Russia
  - (bronze) : Spain
  - 4th: Ukraine
- 16 May – 1 June: 2022 UEFA European Under-17 Championship in Israel
  - (gold) : France
  - (silver) : Netherlands
  - (bronze) : Portugal
  - (bronze) : Serbia
- 18 June – 1 July: 2022 UEFA European Under-19 Championship in Slovakia
  - (gold) : England
  - (silver) : Israel
  - (bronze) : France
  - (bronze) : Italy
- 3–10 September: 2022 UEFA Under-19 Futsal Championship in Spain
  - (gold) : Spain
  - (silver) : Portugal
  - (bronze) : Ukraine
  - (bronze) : Poland

==== Friendly tournaments ====
===== Senior =====
- 23–29 March: 2022 FAS Tri-Nations Series in Singapore
  - (gold) : Singapore
  - (silver) : Malaysia
  - (bronze) : Philippines
- 23–29 March: Tri-Nations Series in Portugal
  - (gold) : Angola
  - (silver) : Guinea-Bissau
  - (bronze) : Equatorial Guinea
- 23–29 March: 2022 Nouakchott Cup in Mauritania
  - (gold) : Mauritania
  - (silver) : Libya
  - (bronze) : Mozambique
  - 4th: Niger
- 23–29 March: International Tournament in Tanzania
  - (gold) : Tanzania
  - (silver) : Sudan
  - (bronze) : Central African Republic
- 25–29 March: 2022 Courts Caribbean Classic in Trinidad and Tobago
  - (gold) : Trinidad and Tobago
  - (silver) : Guyana
  - (bronze) : Barbados
- 25–29 March: 2022 Navruz Cup in Uzbekistan
  - (gold) : Uzbekistan
  - (silver) : Uganda
  - (bronze) : Tajikistan
  - 4th: Kyrgyzstan
- 10–14 June: 2022 Kirin Cup Soccer in Japan
  - (gold) : Tunisia
  - (silver) : Japan
  - (bronze) : Ghana
  - 4th: Chile
- 22–25 September: 2022 King's Cup in Thailand
  - (gold) : Tajikistan
  - (silver) : Malaysia
  - (bronze) : Thailand
  - 4th: Trinidad and Tobago
- 23–26 September: 2022 Jordan International Tournament in Jordan
  - (gold) : Jordan
  - (silver) : Oman
  - (bronze) : Iraq
  - 4th: Syria
- 16–19 November: 2022 Baltic Cup in Estonia, Latvia, and Lithuania
  - (gold) : Iceland
  - (silver) : Latvia
  - (bronze) : Estonia
  - 4th: Lithuania

===== Youth =====
- 6–13 February: 2022 Development Cup in Belarus
  - (gold) : Israel
  - (silver) : Belarus
  - (bronze) : Belarus
  - 4th: Tajikistan
- 11–15 February: 2022 Algarve Cup U17 in Portugal
  - (gold) : Spain
  - (silver) : Germany
  - (bronze) : Portugal
  - 4th: Slovakia
- 20–29 March: 2022 Dubai International Cup U-23 in United Arab Emirates
  - (gold) : Japan
  - (silver) : Saudi Arabia
  - (bronze) : United Arab Emirates
  - 4th: China
- 29 May – 12 June: 2022 Maurice Revello Tournament in France
  - (gold) : France
  - (silver) : Venezuela
  - (bronze) : Mexico
  - 4th: Colombia
- 8–12 June: 2022 U-16 International Dream Cup in Japan
  - (gold) : Japan
  - (silver) : Mexico
  - (bronze) : Uruguay
  - 4th: South Korea
- 9–13 June: 2022 Under-19 Baltic Cup in Latvia
  - (gold) : Latvia
  - (silver) : Finland
  - (bronze) : Estonia
  - 4th: Lithuania
- 26 June – 5 July: Football at the 2022 Mediterranean Games in Algeria
  - (gold) : France
  - (silver) : Italy
  - (bronze) : Morocco
  - 4th: Turkey
- 29 June – 3 July: 2022 Under-17 Baltic Cup in Finland
  - (gold) : Latvia
  - (silver) : Finland
  - (bronze) : Estonia
  - 4th: Lithuania
- 2 – 4 July: Football at the 2022 Bolivarian Games in Colombia
  - (gold) : Paraguay
  - (silver) : Bolivia
  - (bronze) : Colombia
  - 4th: Dominican Republic
- 5–11 August: 2022 International U19 Thanh Nien Cup in Vietnam
  - (gold) : Vietnam
  - (silver) : Malaysia
  - (bronze) : Thailand
  - 4th: Myanmar
- 8–16 August: Football at the 2021 Islamic Solidarity Games in Turkey
  - (gold) : Turkey
  - (silver) : Saudi Arabia
  - (bronze) : Azerbaijan
  - 4th: Algeria

=== Women's national teams ===
==== FIFA ====
- 10–28 August: 2022 FIFA U-20 Women's World Cup in Costa Rica
  - (gold) : Spain
  - (silver) : Japan
  - (bronze) : Brazil
  - 4th: Netherlands
- 11–30 October: 2022 FIFA U-17 Women's World Cup in India
  - (gold) : Spain
  - (silver) : Colombia
  - (bronze) : Nigeria
  - 4th: Germany

==== AFC ====
- 20 January – 6 February: 2022 AFC Women's Asian Cup in India
  - (gold) : China
  - (silver) : South Korea
  - (bronze) : Japan
  - (bronze) : Philippines
- 6–22 May: Football at the 2021 Southeast Asian Games in Vietnam
  - (gold) : Vietnam
  - (silver) : Thailand
  - (bronze) : Philippines
  - 4th: Myanmar

===== AFF =====
- 4–17 July: 2022 AFF Women's Championship in Philippines
  - (gold) : Philippines
  - (silver) : Thailand
  - (bronze) : Myanmar
  - 4th: Vietnam
- 22 July – 4 August: 2022 AFF U-18 Women's Championship in Indonesia
  - (gold) : Australia
  - (silver) : Vietnam
  - (bronze) : Thailand
  - 4th: Myanmar

===== CAFA =====
- January 21–28: 2022 CAFA Women's Futsal Championship in Tajikistan
  - (gold) : Iran
  - (silver) : Uzbekistan
  - (bronze) : Kyrgyzstan
  - 4th: Tajikistan
- 11 – 15 March: 2022 CAFA Women's Under-18 Championship in Tajikistan
  - (gold) : Iran
  - (silver) : Uzbekistan
  - (bronze) : Kyrgyzstan
  - 4th: Tajikistan

===== EAFF =====
- 19–27 July: 2022 EAFF E-1 Football Championship (women) in Japan
  - (gold) : Japan
  - (silver) : China
  - (bronze) : South Korea
  - 4th: Chinese Taipei

===== SAFF =====
- 15 – 25 March: 2022 SAFF U-18 Women's Championship in India
  - (gold) : India
  - (silver) : Bangladesh
  - (bronze) : Nepal

===== WAFF =====
- 16 – 24 June: 2022 WAFF Women's Futsal Championship in Saudi Arabia
  - (gold) : Iraq
  - (silver) : Saudi Arabia
  - (bronze) : Bahrain
  - 4th: Kuwait

==== CAF ====
- 2–23 July: 2022 Africa Women Cup of Nations in Morocco
  - (gold) : South Africa
  - (silver) : Morocco
  - (bronze) : Zambia
  - 4th: Nigeria

===== CECAFA =====
- 1–11 June: 2022 CECAFA Women's Championship in Uganda
  - (gold) : Uganda
  - (silver) : Burundi
  - (bronze) : Ethiopia
  - 4th: Tanzania

==== CONCACAF ====
- 4–18 July: 2022 CONCACAF W Championship in Mexico
  - (gold) : United States
  - (silver) : Canada
  - (bronze) : Jamaica
  - 4th: Costa Rica
- 25 February – 12 March: 2022 CONCACAF Women's U-20 Championship in the Dominican Republic
  - (gold) : United States
  - (silver) : Mexico
  - (bronze) : Canada
  - 4th: Puerto Rico
- 23 April – 8 May: 2022 CONCACAF Women's U-17 Championship in the Dominican Republic
  - (gold) : United States
  - (silver) : Mexico
  - (bronze) : Canada
  - 4th: Puerto Rico

==== CONMEBOL ====
- 8–30 July: 2022 Copa América Femenina in Colombia
  - (gold) : Brazil
  - (silver) : Colombia
  - (bronze) : Argentina
  - 4th: Paraguay
- 6–14 April: 2022 South American Under-20 Women's Football Championship in Chile
  - (gold) : Brazil
  - (silver) : Colombia
  - (bronze) : Uruguay
  - 4th: Venezuela
- 1–19 March: 2022 South American Under-17 Women's Football Championship in Uruguay
  - (gold) : Brazil
  - (silver) : Colombia
  - (bronze) : Chile
  - 4th: Paraguay

==== OFC ====
- 2022 OFC U-17 Women's Championship in Tahiti (cancelled)
- April: 2022 OFC U-20 Women's Championship (cancelled)
- 5–31 July: 2022 OFC Women's Nations Cup in Fiji
  - (gold) : Papua New Guinea
  - (silver) : Fiji
  - (bronze) : Solomon Islands
  - 4th: Samoa

==== UEFA ====
- 6–31 July: UEFA Women's Euro 2022 in England
  - (gold) : England
  - (silver) : Germany
  - (bronze) : Sweden
  - (bronze) : France
- 26 June – 9 July: 2022 UEFA Women's Under-19 Championship in Czech Republic
  - (gold) : Spain
  - (silver) : Norway
  - (bronze) : Sweden
  - (bronze) : France
- 5–15 May: 2022 UEFA Women's Under-17 Championship in Bosnia and Herzegovina
  - (gold) : Germany
  - (silver) : Spain
  - (bronze) : France
  - 4th: Netherlands
- 1–3 July: UEFA Women's Futsal Euro 2022 in Portugal
  - (gold) : Spain
  - (silver) : Portugal
  - (bronze) : Ukraine
  - 4th: Hungary

==== Friendly tournaments ====
===== Senior =====
- 16–22 February: 2022 Tournoi de France in France
  - (gold) : France
  - (silver) : Netherlands
  - (bronze) : Brazil
  - 4th: Finland
- 16–22 February: 2022 Malta International Women's Football Tournament in Malta
  - (gold) : Morocco
  - (silver) : Malta
  - (bronze) : Moldova
- 16–23 February: 2022 Algarve Cup in Portugal
  - (gold) : Sweden
  - (silver) : Italy
  - (bronze) : Norway
  - 4th: Portugal
- 16–22 February: 2022 Pinatar Cup in Spain
  - (gold) : Belgium
  - (silver) : Russia
  - (bronze) : Republic of Ireland
  - 4th: Wales
- 16–22 February: 2022 Turkish Women's Cup in Turkey
  - (gold) : Ukraine
  - (silver) : Venezuela
  - (bronze) : Uzbekistan
  - 4th: Latvia
- 17–23 February: 2022 Arnold Clark Cup in England
  - (gold) : England
  - (silver) : Spain
  - (bronze) : Canada
  - 4th: Germany
- 17–23 February: 2022 SheBelieves Cup in the United States
  - (gold) : United States
  - (silver) : Iceland
  - (bronze) : Czech Republic
  - 4th: New Zealand

===== Youth =====
- 22–28 June: 2022 Sud Ladies Cup in the France
  - (gold) : United States
  - (silver) : France
  - (bronze) : Mexico
  - 4th: Netherlands
- 26–28 June: Football at the 2022 Bolivarian Games in the Colombia
  - (gold) : Colombia
  - (silver) : Paraguay
  - (bronze) : Venezuela
  - 4th: Panama

== Club continental champions ==
=== Men ===
Region	Tournament	Defending champion	Champion	Title	Last honour
AFC (Asia)	2022 AFC Champions League	(Saudi Arabia) Al-Hilal	(Japan) Urawa Red Diamonds	3rd	2017
AFC (Asia)	2022 AFC Cup	(Bahrain) Al-Muharraq	(Oman) Al-Seeb	1st	—
AFC (Asia)	2022 ASEAN Club Championship	(Singapore) Tampines Rovers (2005)	Season cancelled, due to the COVID-19 pandemic		
CAF (Africa)	2021–22 CAF Champions League	(Egypt) Al Ahly	(Morocco) Wydad AC	3rd	2017
CAF (Africa)	2021–22 CAF Confederation Cup	(Morocco) Raja Casablanca	(Morocco) Berkane	2nd	2019–20
CAF (Africa)	2022 CAF Super Cup	(Egypt) Al Ahly	(Morocco) Berkane	1st	—
CONCACAF (North and Central America, Caribbean)	2022 CONCACAF Champions League	(Mexico) Monterrey	(United States) Seattle Sounders FC	1st	—
CONCACAF (North and Central America, Caribbean)	2022 CONCACAF League	(Guatemala) Comunicaciones	(Honduras) Olimpia	2nd	2017
CONCACAF (North and Central America, Caribbean)	2022 Caribbean Club Championship	(Haiti) Cavaly	(Haiti) Violette	1st	—
CONCACAF (North and Central America, Caribbean)	2022 Caribbean Club Shield	(Suriname) Robinhood (2019)	(Puerto Rico) Bayamon FC	1st	—
CONMEBOL (South America)	2022 Copa Libertadores	(Brazil) Palmeiras	(Brazil) Flamengo	3rd	2019
CONMEBOL (South America)	2022 Copa Sudamericana	(Brazil) Athletico Paranaense	(Ecuador) Independiente del Valle	2nd	2019
CONMEBOL (South America)	2022 Recopa Sudamericana	(Argentina) Defensa y Justicia	(Brazil) Palmeiras	1st	—
OFC (Oceania)	2022 OFC Champions League	(New Caledonia) Hienghène Sport (2019)	(New Zealand) Auckland City	10th	2017
UEFA (Europe)	2021–22 UEFA Champions League	(England) Chelsea	(Spain) Real Madrid	14th	2017–18
UEFA (Europe)	2021–22 UEFA Europa League	(Spain) Villarreal	(Germany) Eintracht Frankfurt	2nd	1979–80
UEFA (Europe)	2021–22 UEFA Europa Conference League	The first edition	(Italy) Roma	1st	—
UEFA (Europe)	2022 UEFA Super Cup	(England) Chelsea	(Spain) Real Madrid	5th	2017
UEFA (Europe)	2021–22 UEFA Youth League	(Spain) Real Madrid (2019–20)	(Portugal) Benfica	1st	—
FIFA (Global)	2021 FIFA Club World Cup	(Germany) Bayern Munich	(England) Chelsea	1st	–

=== Women ===
Region	Tournament	Defending champion	Champion	Title	Last honour
AFC (Asia)	2022 AFC Women's Club Championship	(Jordan) Amman SC	(Thailand) College of Asian Scholars (East); (Uzbekistan) Sogdiana Jizzakh (West)	1st	—
CAF (Africa)	2022 CAF Women's Champions League	(South Africa) Mamelodi Sundowns	(Morocco) AS FAR	1st	—
CONMEBOL (South America)	2022 Copa Libertadores Femenina	(Brazil) Corinthians	(Brazil) Palmeiras	1st	—
UEFA (Europe)	2021–22 UEFA Women's Champions League	(Spain) Barcelona	(France) Lyon	8th	2019–20

== National leagues ==
=== UEFA ===
Nation	League	Champion	Second place	Title	Last honour
Albania	2021–22 Kategoria Superiore	Tirana	Laçi	26th	2019–20
Andorra	2021–22 Primera Divisió	Inter Escaldes	UE Santa Coloma	3rd	2020–21
Armenia	2021–22 Armenian Premier League	Pyunik	Ararat-Armenia	15th	2014–15
Austria	2021–22 Austrian Football Bundesliga	Red Bull Salzburg	Sturm Graz	16th	2020–21
Azerbaijan	2021–22 Azerbaijan Premier League	Qarabağ	Neftçi	9th	2019–20
Belarus	2022 Belarusian Premier League	Shakhtyor Soligorsk	Energetik-BGU Minsk	4th	2021
Belgium	2021–22 Belgian First Division A	Club Brugge	Union SG	18th	2020–21
Bosnia and Herzegovina	2021–22 Premier League of Bosnia and Herzegovina	Zrinjski Mostar	Tuzla City	7th	2017–18
Bulgaria	2021–22 First Professional Football League	Ludogorets Razgrad	CSKA Sofia	11th	2020–21
Croatia	2021–22 Croatian First Football League	Dinamo Zagreb	Hajduk Split	23rd	2020–21
Cyprus	2021–22 Cypriot First Division	Apollon Limassol	AEK Larnaca	4th	2005–06
Czech Republic	2021–22 Czech First League	Viktoria Plzeň	Slavia Prague	6th	2017–18
Denmark	2021–22 Danish Superliga	Copenhagen	Midtjylland	14th	2018–19
England	2021–22 Premier League	Manchester City	Liverpool	8th	2020–21
Estonia	2022 Meistriliiga	Flora	FCI Levadia	14th	2020
Faroe Islands	2022 Effodeildin	KÍ	Víkingur	20th	2021
Finland	2022 Veikkausliiga	HJK	KuPS	32nd	2021
France	2021–22 Ligue 1	Paris Saint-Germain	Marseille	10th	2019–20
(Georgia (country)) Georgia	2022 Erovnuli Liga	Dinamo Tbilisi	Dinamo Batumi	19th	2020
Germany	2021–22 Bundesliga	Bayern Munich	Borussia Dortmund	32nd	2020–21
Gibraltar	2021–22 Gibraltar National League	Lincoln Red Imps	Europa	26th	2020–21
Greece	2021–22 Super League Greece	Olympiacos	PAOK	47th	2020–21
Hungary	2021–22 Nemzeti Bajnokság I	Ferencváros	Kisvárda	33rd	2020–21
Iceland	2022 Besta deild karla	Breiðablik	KA	2nd	2010
(Republic of Ireland) Ireland	2022 League of Ireland Premier Division	Shamrock Rovers	Derry City	20th	2021
Israel	2021–22 Israeli Premier League	Maccabi Haifa	Hapoel Be'er Sheva	14th	2020–21
Italy	2021–22 Serie A	Milan	Internazionale	19th	2010–11
Kazakhstan	2022 Kazakhstan Premier League	Astana	Aktobe	7th	2019
Kosovo	2021–22 Football Superleague of Kosovo	Ballkani	Drita	1st	—
Latvia	2022 Latvian Higher League	Valmiera	Riga	1st	—
Lithuania	2022 A Lyga	Žalgiris	Kauno Žalgiris	10th	2021
Luxembourg	2021–22 Luxembourg National Division	F91 Dudelange	Differdange 03	16th	2018–19
Malta	2021–22 Maltese Premier League	Hibernians	Floriana	13th	2016–17
Moldova	2021–22 Moldovan National Division	Sheriff Tiraspol	Petrocub Hîncești	20th	2020–21
Montenegro	2021–22 Montenegrin First League	Sutjeska Nikšić	Budućnost Podgorica	5th	2018–19
Netherlands	2021–22 Eredivisie	Ajax	PSV Eindhoven	36th	2020–21
North Macedonia	2021–22 Macedonian First Football League	Shkupi	Akademija Pandev	1st	—
Northern Ireland	2021–22 NIFL Premiership	Linfield	Cliftonville	56th	2020–21
Norway	2022 Eliteserien	Molde	Bodø/Glimt	5th	2019
Poland	2021–22 Ekstraklasa	Lech Poznań	Raków Częstochowa	8th	2014–15
Portugal	2021–22 Primeira Liga	Porto	Sporting CP	30th	2019–20
Romania	2021–22 Liga I	CFR Cluj	FCSB	8th	2020–21
Russia	2021–22 Russian Premier League	Zenit Saint Petersburg	Sochi	9th	2020–21
San Marino	2021–22 Campionato Sammarinese di Calcio	La Fiorita	Tre Penne	6th	2017–18
Scotland	2021–22 Scottish Premiership	Celtic	Rangers	52nd	2019–20
Serbia	2021–22 Serbian SuperLiga	Red Star Belgrade	Partizan	33rd	2020–21
Slovakia	2021–22 Slovak First Football League	Slovan Bratislava	Ružomberok	12th	2020–21
Slovenia	2021–22 Slovenian PrvaLiga	Maribor	Koper	16th	2018–19
Spain	2021–22 La Liga	Real Madrid	Barcelona	35th	2019–20
Sweden	2022 Allsvenskan	BK Häcken	Djurgården	1st	—
Switzerland	2021–22 Swiss Super League	Zürich	Basel	13th	2008–09
Turkey	2021–22 Süper Lig	Trabzonspor	Fenerbahçe	7th	1983–84
Ukraine	2021–22 Ukrainian Premier League	Season abandoned due to the Russian invasion of Ukraine			
Wales	2021–22 Cymru Premier	The New Saints	Bala Town	14th	2018–19

=== AFC ===
Nation	League	Champion	Second place	Title	Last honour
Afghanistan	2022 Afghan Premier League	Season Cancelled, due to the Taliban takeover			
Australia	2021–22 A-League Men	Western United	Melbourne City	1st	—
Bahrain	2021–22 Bahraini Premier League	Al-Riffa	Manama	14th	2020–21
Bangladesh	2021–22 Bangladesh Premier League	Bashundhara Kings	Abahani Limited Dhaka	3rd	2020–21
Bhutan	2022 Bhutan Premier League	Paro	Thimphu City	3rd	2021
Brunei	2022 Brunei Super League	Season Cancelled, due to the COVID-19 pandemic			
Cambodia	2022 Cambodian Premier League	Phnom Penh Crown	Visakha	8th	2021
China	2022 Chinese Super League	Wuhan Three Towns	Shandong Taishan	1st	—
Chinese Taipei	2022 Taiwan Football Premier League	Tainan City	Taichung Futuro	3rd	2021
(North Korea) DPR Korea	2021–22 DPR Korea Premier Football League	Season Cancelled, due to the COVID-19 pandemic			
Guam	2021–22 Guam Soccer League	Season Cancelled, due to the COVID-19 pandemic			
Hong Kong	2021–22 Hong Kong Premier League	Season Abandoned, due to the COVID-19 pandemic			
India	2021–22 I-League	Gokulam Kerala	Mohammedan	2nd	2020–21
India	2021–22 Indian Super League	Jamshedpur	Hyderabad	1st	—
Indonesia	2021–22 Liga 1	Bali United	Persib Bandung	2nd	2019
Iran	2021–22 Persian Gulf Pro League	Esteghlal	Persepolis	9th	2012–13
Iraq	2021–22 Iraqi Premier League	Al-Shorta	Al-Quwa Al-Jawiya	5th	2018–19
Japan	2022 J1 League	Yokohama F. Marinos	Kawasaki Frontale	5th	2019
Jordan	2022 Jordanian Pro League	Al-Faisaly	Al-Wehdat	35th	2018-19
Kuwait	2021–22 Kuwaiti Premier League	Kuwait SC	Kazma	17th	2019–20
Kyrgyzstan	2022 Kyrgyz Premier League	Abdysh-Ata Kant	Alay Osh	1st	—
Laos	2022 Lao Premier League	Young Elephants	Master 7	1st	—
Lebanon	2021–22 Lebanese Premier League	Al Ahed	Al Ansar	8th	2018–19
Macau	2022 Liga de Elite	Chao Pak Kei	Monte Carlo	3rd	2021
Malaysia	2022 Malaysia Super League	Johor Darul Ta'zim	Terengganu	9th	2021
Maldives	2022 Dhivehi Premier League	Maziya	Eagles	4th	2020–21
Mongolia	2021–22 Mongolian National Premier League	Khaan Khuns-Erchim	Ulaanbaatar	13th	2018
Myanmar	2022 Myanmar National League	Shan United	Yangon United	4th	2020
Nepal	2022 Nepal Super League				
Northern Mariana Islands	2022 M*League Division 1 (Spring)				
Northern Mariana Islands	2022 M*League Division 1 (Fall)				
Oman	2021–22 Oman Professional League	Al-Seeb	Al-Nahda	2nd	2019–20
Pakistan	2021–22 Pakistan Premier League				
Palestine	2021–22 West Bank Premier League	Shabab Al-Khalil	Jabal Al-Mukaber	7th	2020–21
Palestine	2021–22 Gaza Strip Premier League				
Philippines	2022 Philippines Football League	Not held, format changed to fall–spring schedule			
Qatar	2021–22 Qatar Stars League	Al Sadd	Al-Duhail	16th	2020–21
Saudi Arabia	2021–22 Saudi Professional League	Al-Hilal	Al-Ittihad	18th	2020–21
Singapore	2022 Singapore Premier League	Albirex Niigata (S)	Lion City Sailors	5th	2020
South Korea	2022 K League 1	Ulsan Hyundai	Jeonbuk Hyundai Motors	3rd	2005
Sri Lanka	2022 Sri Lanka Super League				
Syria	2021–22 Syrian Premier League	Tishreen	Al-Wathba	5th	2020–21
Tajikistan	2022 Tajikistan Higher League	Istiklol	Khatlon	11th	2021
Thailand	2021–22 Thai League 1	Buriram United	BG Pathum United	8th	2018
Timor-Leste	2022 Liga Futebol Amadora				
Turkmenistan	2022 Ýokary Liga				
United Arab Emirates	2021–22 UAE Pro League	Al Ain	Sharjah	14th	2017–18
Uzbekistan	2022 Uzbekistan Super League	Pakhtakor Tashkent	Navbahor Namangan	15th	2021
Vietnam	2022 V.League 1	Hanoi FC	Haiphong FC	6th	2019
Yemen	2022 Yemen League Division One				

=== CAF ===
Nation	League	Champion	Second place	Title	Last honour
Algeria	2021–22 Algerian Ligue Professionnelle 1	CR Belouizdad	JS Kabylie	9th	2020–21
Angola	2021–22 Girabola	Petro de Luanda	Primeiro de Agosto	16th	2009
Benin	2021–22 Benin Premier League	Coton Sport	Buffles du Borgou	17th	2021
Botswana	2021–22 Botswana Premier League	Gaborone Utd	Township Rollers	7th	2009
Burkina Faso	2021–22 Burkinabé Premier League	Kadiogo	Majestic	4th	2016–17
Burundi	2021–22 Burundi Premier League	Flambeau du Centre	Athlético New Oil FC	1st	—
Cameroon	2022 Cameroon Elite One	Coton Sport	Eding Sport	17th	2020–21
Cape Verde	2022 Cape Verdean Football Championships				
Central African Republic	2021–22 Central African Republic League	Olympic Real	Red Star	13th	2016–17
Chad	2022 LINAFOOT				
Comoros	2021–22 Comoros Premier League	Volcan Club	Steal Nouvel	3rd	2018
(Republic of the Congo) Congo	2021–22 Congo Premier League	AS Otohô	Diables Noirs	5th	2021
(Democratic Republic of the Congo) DR Congo	2021–22 Linafoot	TP Mazembe	AS Vita Club	19th	2019–20
Djibouti	2021–22 Djibouti Premier League	Arta/Solar7	Port	6th	2020–21
Egypt	2021–22 Egyptian Premier League	Zamalek	Pyramids	14th	2021–22
Equatorial Guinea	2021–22 Equatoguinean Primera División	Deportivo Mongomo	Futuro Kings	4th	2010
Eritrea	2022 Eritrean Premier League				
Eswatini	2021–22 Eswatini Premier League	Royal Leopards	Mbabane Highlanders	8th	2020–21
Ethiopia	2021–22 Ethiopian Premier League	Saint George	Fasil Kenema	30th	2016–17
Gabon	2021–22 Gabon Championnat National D1				
(The Gambia) Gambia	2021–22 GFA League First Division	Hawks	Real de Banjul	3rd	1995–96
Ghana	2021–22 Ghana Premier League	Asante Kotoko	Medeama	24th	2013–14
Guinea	2021–22 Guinée Championnat National	Horoya	Académie SOAR	20th	2021
Guinea-Bissau	2021–22 Campeonato Nacional da Guiné-Bissau	Sport Bissau e Benfica	SC de Bissau	15th	2017–18
Ivory Coast	2021–22 Ligue 1	ASEC Mimosas	SC Gagnoa	28th	2021
Kenya	2021–22 FKF Premier League	Tusker	Kakamega Homeboyz	13th	2020–21
Lesotho	2021–22 Lesotho Premier League	Matlama	LDF	11th	2019
Liberia	2022 Liberian First Division League	Watanga	BEA Mountain	1st	—
Libya	2021–22 Libyan Premier League	Al-Ittihad Club (Tripoli)	Al Ahli SC (Tripoli)	19th	2020–21
Madagascar	2021–22 Malagasy Pro League	CFF Andoharanofotsy	Ajesaia	1st	—
Malawi	2021–22 Super League of Malawi				
Mali	2021–22 Malian Première Division	Djoliba	Bakaridjan	23rd	2011–12
Mauritania	2021–22 Ligue 1 Mauritania	FC Nouadhibou	FC Tevragh-Zeina	10th	2020–21
Mauritius	2021–22 Mauritian Premier League				
Morocco	2021–22 Botola	Wydad AC	Raja CA	22nd	2020–21
Mozambique	2022 Moçambola				
Namibia	2022 Namibia Football Premier League				
Niger	2021–22 Niger Premier League	Nigelec	AS Douanes	1st	—
Nigeria	2021–22 Nigeria Professional Football League	Rivers United	Plateau United	1st	—
Réunion	2022 Réunion Premier League				
Rwanda	2021–22 Rwanda Premier League	APR	Kiyovu Sports	20th	2021
São Tomé and Príncipe	2022 São Tomé and Príncipe Championship				
Senegal	2022 Senegal Premier League	Casa Sports	ASC Diaraf	2nd	2012
Seychelles	2021–22 Seychelles First Division	La Passe	Côte d'Or	5th	2009
Sierra Leone	2021–22 Sierra Leone National Premier League	Bo Rangers	East End Lions	1st	—
Somalia	2021–22 Somali First Division				
South Africa	2021–22 South African Premier Division	Mamelodi Sundowns	Cape Town City	12th	2020–21
South Sudan	2022 South Sudan Football Championship				
Sudan	2021–22 Sudan Premier League	Al-Hilal Club (Omdurman)	Al-Merrikh	29th	2020–21
Tanzania	2021–22 Tanzanian Premier League	Young Africans	Simba	28th	2016–17
Togo	2021–22 Togolese Championnat National	ASKO Kara	ASC Kara	7th	2021
Tunisia	2021–22 Tunisian Ligue Professionnelle 1	Espérance de Tunis	US Monastir	32nd	2020–21
Uganda	2022 Uganda Premier League	Vipers	Kampala Capital City	5th	2020
Zambia	2021–22 Zambia Super League	Red Arrows	ZESCO United	2nd	2004
Zanzibar	2021–22 Zanzibar Premier League	KMKM	JKU	7th	2019
Zimbabwe	2021–22 Zimbabwe Premier Soccer League	Platinum	Dynamos	4th	2019

=== CONCACAF ===
Nation	League	Champion	Second place	Title	Last honour
Anguilla	2022 AFA Senior Male League				
Antigua and Barbuda	2021–22 Antigua and Barbuda Premier Division				
Aruba	2021–22 Aruban Division di Honor				
(The Bahamas) Bahamas	2021–22 BFA Senior League				
Barbados	2021–22 Barbados Premier League				
Belize	2021 FFB Top League Opening	Verdes	Altitude	4th	2019 Opening
Belize	2022 FFB Top League Closing	Verdes	Altitude	5th	2021 Opening
Bermuda	2021–22 Bermudian Premier Division	Dandy Town Hornets	PHC Zebras	6th	2015–16
British Virgin Islands	2022 BVIFA National Football League				
Bonaire	2022 Bonaire League				
Canada	2022 Canadian Premier League	Forge FC	Atlético Ottawa	3rd	2020
Cayman Islands	2021–22 Cayman Islands Premier League				
Costa Rica	2022 Liga FPD Clausura	Alajuelense	Herediano	31st	2021 Clausura
Costa Rica	2022 Liga FPD Apertura				
Cuba	2022 Campeonato Nacional de Fútbol de Cuba				
Curaçao	2022 Curaçao Promé Divishon				
Dominica	2022 Dominica Premier League				
Dominican Republic	2022 Liga Dominicana de Fútbol				
El Salvador	2022 Clausura	Alianza	Águila	17th	2021 Apertura
El Salvador	2022 Apertura	FAS	Jocoro	19th	2021 Clausura
French Guiana	2021–22 French Guiana Honor Division				
Grenada	2022 GFA Premier League				
Guadeloupe	2021–22 Guadeloupe Division of Honor				
Guatemala	2022 Clausura				
Guatemala	2022 Apertura				
Guyana	2022 GFF Elite League				
Haiti	2021 Ligue Haïtienne Open				
Haiti	2022 Ligue Haïtienne Close				
Honduras	2022 Clausura	Motagua	Real España	18th	2019 Clausura
Honduras	2022 Apertura				
Jamaica	2022 National Premier League				
Martinique	2021–22 Martinique Championnat National				
Mexico	2022 Clausura	Atlas	Pachuca	3rd	2021 Apertura
Mexico	2022 Apertura	Pachuca	Toluca	7th	2016 Clausura
Nicaragua	2022 Clausura	Diriangén	Walter Ferretti	30th	2021 Apertura
Nicaragua	2022 Apertura	Real Estelí	Walter Ferretti	19th	2020 Clausura
Panama	2022 Apertura				
Panama	2022 Clausura				
Puerto Rico	2022 Liga Puerto Rico				
Saint Kitts and Nevis	2022 SKNFA Premier League				
Saint Kitts and Nevis	2021–22 N1 League				
Saint Lucia	2022 SLFA First Division				
Saint Martin	2021–22 Ligue de Football Saint Martin				
Saint Vincent and the Grenadines	2021–22 SVGFF Premier Division				
Sint Maarten	2021–22 SXMFF League				
Suriname	2022 SVB Eerste Divisie				
Trinidad and Tobago	2022 TT Pro League				
Turks and Caicos Islands	2022 Provo Premier League				
(United States Virgin Islands) U.S. Virgin Islands	2021–22 U.S. Virgin Islands Premier League				
United States & Canada	2022 Major League Soccer	Los Angeles FC	Philadelphia Union	1st	—

=== CONMEBOL ===
Nation	League	Champion	Second place	Title	Last honour
Argentina	2022 Argentine Primera División	Boca Juniors	Racing	35th	2019–20
Bolivia	2022 Bolivian Primera División Apertura	Bolívar	The Strongest	30th	2019 Apertura
Bolivia	2022 Bolivian Primera División Clausura	Tournament abandoned due to civil unrest in the Santa Cruz Department			
Brazil	2022 Campeonato Brasileiro Série A	Palmeiras	Internacional	11th	2018
Chile	2022 Chilean Primera División	Colo-Colo	Ñublense	33rd	2017 Transición
Colombia	2022 Categoría Primera A Apertura	Atlético Nacional	Deportes Tolima	17th	2017 Apertura
Colombia	2022 Categoría Primera A Finalización	Deportivo Pereira	Independiente Medellín	1st	—
Ecuador	2022 Ecuadorian Serie A	Aucas	Barcelona	1st	—
Paraguay	2022 Paraguayan Primera División Apertura	Libertad	Cerro Porteño	22nd	2021 Apertura
Paraguay	2022 Paraguayan Primera División Clausura	Olimpia	Cerro Porteño	46th	2020 Clausura
Peru	2022 Peruvian Liga 1	Alianza Lima	Melgar	25th	2021
Uruguay	2022 Uruguayan Primera División	Nacional	Liverpool	49th	2020
Venezuela	2022 Venezuelan Primera División	Metropolitanos	Monagas	1st	—

=== OFC ===
Nation	League	Champion	Second place	Title	Last honour
Cook Islands	2022 Cook Islands Round Cup				
Fiji	2022 Fiji Premier League				
Kiribati	2022 Kiribati National Championship				
New Caledonia	2022 New Caledonia Super Ligue				
New Zealand	2022 New Zealand National League	Auckland City	Wellington Olympic	9th	2019–20 NZFC
Papua New Guinea	2022 Papua New Guinea National Soccer League				
Niue	2022 Niue Soccer Tournament				
American Samoa	2022 FFAS Senior League	Ilaoa and To'omata	Pago Youth	1st	–
Samoa	2022 Samoa National League				
Solomon Islands	2022 Solomon Islands S-League				
(French Polynesia) Tahiti	2021–22 Tahiti Ligue 1	Pirae	Dragon	11th	2020–21
Tonga	2022 Tonga Major League				
Tuvalu	2022 Tuvalu A-Division				
Vanuatu	2022 VFF National Super League				
Vanuatu	2021–22 Port Vila Premier League				

=== Non-FIFA ===
Nation	League	Champion	Second place	Title	Last honour
(Autonomous Republic of Crimea) Crimea	2021–22 Crimean Premier League				
Gozo	2021–22 Gozo Football League First Division	Nadur Youngsters	Għajnsielem	13th	2019–20
Greenland	2022 Greenlandic Football Championship	Nagdlunguaq-48	B-67 Nuuk	12th	2019
Isle of Man	2022 Isle of Man Premier League				
// Alderney/Guernsey/Jersey	2021–22 Priaulx League	St. Martins	Northerners	16th	2020–21
Mayotte	2022 Mayotte Division Honneur				
Northern Cyprus	2021–22 KTFF Süper Lig				
Saint Barthélemy	2022 ligue de football Saint-Barthélemy				
Saint Pierre and Miquelon	2022 Ligue de Football de Saint Pierre et Miquelon				
Orkney	2022 Orkney Amateur Football League				
Saint Helena	2022 SHFA League				
Scilly Islands	2022 Scilly Islands Football League				
Tibet	2022 Tibetan Champions League				
Vatican City	2022 Vatican City Championship				

== Domestic cups ==
=== UEFA ===
Nation	Tournament	Champion	Final score	Second place	Title	Last honour
Albania	2021–22 Albanian Cup	Vllaznia	2–1 (a.e.t.)	Laçi	8th	2020–21
Albania	2022 Albanian Supercup	Tirana	3–2	Vllaznia Shkodër	12th	2017
Andorra	2022 Copa Constitució	Atlètic Club d'Escaldes	4–1	Extremenya	1st	—
Andorra	2022 Andorran Supercup	Inter Club d'Escaldes	2–1	Atlètic Club d'Escaldes	3rd	2021
Armenia	2021–22 Armenian Cup	Noravank	2–0	Urartu	1st	—
Austria	2021–22 Austrian Cup	Red Bull Salzburg	3–0	Ried	9th	2020–21
Azerbaijan	2021–22 Azerbaijan Cup	Qarabağ	1–1 (4–3 p)	Zira	7th	2016–17
Belarus	2021–22 Belarusian Cup	Gomel	2–1	BATE Borisov	3rd	2010–11
Belarus	2022 Belarusian Super Cup	BATE Borisov	1–0	Shakhtyor Soligorsk	8th	2017
Belgium	2021–22 Belgian Cup	Gent	0–0 (4–3 p)	Anderlecht	4th	2009–10
Belgium	2022 Belgian Super Cup	Club Brugge	1–0	Gent	17th	2021
Bosnia and Herzegovina	2021–22 Bosnia and Herzegovina Cup	Velež Mostar	0–0 (4–3 p)	Sarajevo	1st	—
Bulgaria	2021–22 Bulgarian Cup	Levski Sofia	1–0	CSKA Sofia	26th	2006–07
Bulgaria	2022 Bulgarian Supercup	Ludogorets	2–2 (4–3 p)	Levski Sofia	6th	2021
Croatia	2021–22 Croatian Football Cup	Hajduk Split	3–1	Rijeka	7th	2012–13
Cyprus	2021–22 Cypriot Cup	Omonia	0–0 (5–4 p)	Ethnikos Achnas	15th	2011–12
Cyprus	2022 Cypriot Super Cup	Apollon Limassol	2–0	Omonia	4th	2017
Czech Republic	2021–22 Czech Cup	1. FC Slovácko	3–1	AC Sparta Prague	1st	—
Denmark	2021–22 Danish Cup	Midtjylland	0–0 (4–3 p)	OB	2nd	2018–19
England	2021–22 FA Cup	Liverpool	0–0 (6–5 p)	Chelsea	8th	2005–06
England	2022 FA Community Shield	Liverpool	3–1	Manchester City	16th	2006
England	2021–22 EFL Cup	Liverpool	0–0 (11–10 p)	Chelsea	9th	2011–12
Estonia	2021–22 Estonian Cup	Paide Linnameeskond	1–0 (a.e.t.)	Nõmme Kalju	1st	—
Estonia	2022 Estonian Supercup	Levadia	0–0 (4–2 p)	Flora	8th	2018
Faroe Islands	2022 Faroe Islands Cup	Víkingur	1–0	KÍ	6th	2015
Faroe Islands	2022 Faroe Islands Super Cup	KÍ	3–1	B36	2nd	2020
Finland	2022 Finnish Cup	KuPS	1–0	Inter Turku	4th	2021
Finland	2022 Finnish League Cup	Honka	3–1	Inter Turku	3rd	2011
France	2021–22 Coupe de France	Nantes	1–0	Nice	4th	1999–2000
France	2022 Trophée des Champions	Paris Saint-Germain	4–0	Nantes	11th	2020
(Georgia (country)) Georgia	2022 Georgian Cup	Torpedo Kutaisi	2–0	Locomotive Tbilisi II	5th	2018
(Georgia (country)) Georgia	2022 Georgian Super Cup	Dinamo Batumi	0–0 (7–6 p)	Saburtalo Tbilisi	2nd	1998
Germany	2021–22 DFB-Pokal	RB Leipzig	1–1 (4–2 p)	Freiburg	1st	—
Germany	2022 DFL-Supercup	Bayern Munich	5–3	RB Leipzig	10th	2021
Gibraltar	2022 Rock Cup	Lincoln Red Imps	2–1	Bruno's Magpies	19th	2021
Gibraltar	2022 Pepe Reyes Cup	Lincoln Red Imps	1–0	Europa	12th	2017
Greece	2021–22 Greek Football Cup	Panathinaikos	1–0	PAOK	19th	2013–14
Hungary	2021–22 Magyar Kupa	Ferencváros	3–0	Paks	24th	2016–17
Iceland	2022 Icelandic Cup	Víkingur Reykjavík	3–2	FH	4th	2021
Iceland	2022 Icelandic Men's Football Super Cup	Víkingur Reykjavík	1–0	Breiðablik	3rd	1983
Iceland	2022 Deildarbikar	FH	2–0	Víkingur Reykjavík	7th	2014
(Republic of Ireland) Ireland	2022 FAI Cup	Derry City	4–0	Shelbourne	6th	2012
(Republic of Ireland) Ireland	2022 President of Ireland's Cup	Shamrock Rovers	1–1 (5–4 p)	St Patrick's Athletic	1st	—
Israel	2021–22 Israel State Cup	Hapoel Be'er Sheva	2–2 (3–1 p)	Maccabi Haifa	3rd	2019–20
Israel	2021–22 Toto Cup Al	Maccabi Haifa	1–1 (7–6 p)	Hapoel Be'er Sheva	5th	2007–08
Israel	2022 Israel Super Cup	Hapoel Be'er Sheva	1–1 (4–3 p)	Maccabi Haifa	4th	2017
Italy	2021–22 Coppa Italia	Internazionale	4–2 (a.e.t.)	Juventus	8th	2010–11
Italy	2022 Supercoppa Italiana	Internazionale	3–0	A.C. Milan	7th	2021
Kazakhstan	2022 Kazakhstan Cup	Ordabasy	5–4 (a.e.t.)	Akzhayik	2nd	2011
Kazakhstan	2022 Kazakhstan Super Cup	Tobol	2–1	Kairat	2nd	2021
Kosovo	2021–22 Kosovar Cup	Llapi	2–1	Drita	2nd	2020–21
Kosovo	2022 Kosovar Supercup					
Latvia	2022 Latvian Football Cup	Auda	1–0	RFS	1st	—
Liechtenstein	2021–22 Liechtenstein Cup	Vaduz	3–1	Eschen/Mauren	48th	2018–19
Lithuania	2022 Lithuanian Football Cup	Žalgiris	2–1 (a.e.t.)	Hegelmann	14th	2021
Lithuania	2022 Lithuanian Supercup	Sūduva	0–0 (3–2 p)	Žalgiris	4th	2019
Luxembourg	2021–22 Luxembourg Cup	Racing Union	3–2	Dudelange	2nd	2017–18
Malta	2021–22 Maltese FA Trophy	Floriana	2–1 (a.e.t.)	Valletta	21st	2016–17
Malta	2022 Maltese SuperCup	Hibernians				
Moldova	2021–22 Moldovan Cup	Sheriff Tiraspol	1–0	Sfîntul Gheorghe	11th	2018–19
Moldova	2022 Moldovan Super Cup					
Montenegro	2021–22 Montenegrin Cup	Budućnost	1–0	Dečić	4th	2020–21
Netherlands	2021–22 KNVB Cup	PSV	2–1	Ajax	10th	2011–12
Netherlands	2022 Johan Cruyff Shield	PSV	5–3	Ajax	13th	2021
North Macedonia	2021–22 Macedonian Football Cup	Makedonija GP	0–0 (4–3 p)	Sileks	2nd	2005–06
Northern Ireland	2021–22 Irish Cup	Crusaders	2–1 (a.e.t.)	Ballymena United	5th	2018–19
Northern Ireland	2021–22 NIFL Cup	Cliftonville	4–3 (a.e.t.)	Coleraine	6th	2015–16
Northern Ireland	2022 Northern Ireland Charity Shield	Crusaders				
Norway	2021–22 Norwegian Football Cup	Molde	1–0	Bodø/Glimt	5th	2014
Poland	2021–22 Polish Cup	Raków Częstochowa	3–1	Lech Poznań	2nd	2020–21
Poland	2022 Polish Super Cup	Raków Częstochowa	2–0	Lech Poznań	2nd	2021
Portugal	2021–22 Taça de Portugal	Porto	3–1	Tondela	18th	2019–20
Portugal	2021–22 Taça da Liga	Sporting CP	2–1	Benfica	4th	2020–21
Portugal	2022 Supertaça Cândido de Oliveira	Porto	3–0	Tondela	23rd	2020
Romania	2021–22 Cupa României	Sepsi Sfântu Gheorghe	2–1	Voluntari	1st	—
Romania	2022 Supercupa României	Sepsi Sfântu Gheorghe	2–1	CFR Cluj	1st	—
Russia	2021–22 Russian Cup	Spartak Moscow	2–1	Dynamo Moscow	4th	2002–03
Russia	2022 Russian Super Cup	Zenit Saint Petersburg	4–0	Spartak Moscow	7th	2021
San Marino	2021–22 Coppa Titano	Tre Fiori	3–1	Folgore	8th	2018–19
San Marino	2022 Super Coppa Sammarinese	Tre Fiori	2–1 (a.e.t.)	La Fiorita	2nd	2019
Scotland	2021–22 Scottish Cup	Rangers	2–0 (a.e.t.)	Heart of Midlothian	34th	2008–09
Scotland	2021–22 Scottish League Cup	Celtic	2–1	Hibernian	20th	2019–20
Serbia	2021–22 Serbian Cup	Red Star Belgrade	2–1 (a.e.t.)	Partizan	5th	2020–21
Slovakia	2021–22 Slovak Cup	Spartak Trnava	2–1 (a.e.t.)	Slovan Bratislava	7th	2018–19
Slovenia	2021–22 Slovenian Cup	Koper	3–1	Bravo	4th	2014–15
Spain	2021–22 Copa del Rey	Real Betis	1–1 (5–4 p)	Valencia	3rd	2004–05
Spain	2022 Supercopa de España	Real Madrid	2–0	Athletic Bilbao	12th	2020
Sweden	2021–22 Svenska Cupen	Malmö FF	0–0 (4–3 p)	Hammarby IF	15th	1988–89
Switzerland	2021–22 Swiss Cup	FC Lugano	4–1	FC St. Gallen	4th	1992–93
Turkey	2021–22 Turkish Cup	Sivasspor	3–2 (a.e.t.)	Kayserispor	1st	—
Turkey	2022 Turkish Super Cup	Trabzonspor	4–0	Sivasspor	10th	2020
Ukraine	2021–22 Ukrainian Cup	Tournament abandoned due to the Russian invasion of Ukraine				
Wales	2021–22 Welsh Cup	The New Saints	3–2	Penybont	8th	2018–19
Wales	2021–22 Welsh League Cup	Connah's Quay Nomads	0–0 (10–9 p)	Cardiff MU	3rd	2019–20

=== AFC ===
Nation	Tournament	Champion	Final score	Second place	Title	Last honour
Australia	2022 Australia Cup (Note: Competition renamed from FFA Cup after the 2021 edition.)	Macarthur FC	2–0	Sydney United 58	1st	—
Bahrain	2021–22 Bahraini King's Cup	Al-Khaldiya	0–0 (4–3 p)	East Riffa Club	1st	—
Bahrain	2021–22 Bahraini FA Cup					
Bangladesh	2021–22 Bangladesh Federation Cup	Abahani Limited	2–1	Rahmatganj	12th	2018
Bhutan	2022 Coronation Championship					
Brunei	2022 Brunei FA Cup	DPMM	2–1	Kasuka	2nd	2004
Brunei	2022 Brunei Super Cup					
Cambodia	2022 Hun Sen Cup	Visakha FC	4–3 (a.e.t.)	Boeung Ket	3rd	2021
Cambodia	2022 Cambodian Super Cup	Phnom Penh Crown	2–1	Visakha	1st	—
China	2022 Chinese FA Cup	Shandong Taishan	2–1	Zhejiang	8th	2021
China	2022 Chinese FA Super Cup					
Guam	2022 Guam FA Cup					
Hong Kong	2021–22 Hong Kong FA Cup					
Hong Kong	2021–22 Sapling Cup					
Hong Kong	2021–22 Hong Kong Senior Challenge Shield					
India	2022 Durand Cup	Bengaluru	2–1	Mumbai City	1st	–
India	2022 Indian Super Cup					
Indonesia	2022 Piala Indonesia					
Indonesia	2022 President's Cup	Arema	1–0	Borneo Samarinda	3rd	2019
Indonesia	2022 Menpora Cup					
Iran	2022 Hazfi Cup	Nassaji Mazandaran	1–0	Aluminium Arak	1st	—
Iraq	2021–22 Iraq FA Cup	Al-Karkh	2–1	Al-Kahrabaa	1st	—
Iraq	2022 Iraqi Super Cup	Al-Shorta	1–0	Al-Karkh	2nd	2019
Japan	2022 Emperor's Cup	Ventforet Kofu	1–1 (a.e.t.) (5–4 p)	Sanfrecce Hiroshima	1st	—
Japan	2022 J.League Cup	Sanfrecce Hiroshima	2–1	Cerezo Osaka	1st	—
Japan	2022 Japanese Super Cup	Urawa Red Diamonds	2–0	Kawasaki Frontale	4th	1983
Jordan	2022 Jordan FA Cup					
Jordan	2022 Jordan FA Shield	Al-Faisaly	1–0	Al-Ramtha	8th	2011
Jordan	2022 Jordan Super Cup					
Kuwait	2021–22 Kuwait Emir Cup	Kuwait SC	1–0	Qadsia	15th	2018–19
Kuwait	2021–22 Kuwait Crown Prince Cup	Al-Arabi	1–1 (5–4 p)	Kuwait SC	8th	2014–15
Kuwait	2021–22 Kuwait Federation Cup					
Kyrgyzstan	2022 Kyrgyzstan Cup					
Kyrgyzstan	2022 Kyrgyzstan Super Cup					
Laos	2022 Lao FF Cup					
Lebanon	2021–22 Lebanese FA Cup	Nejmeh	2–1	Al Ansar	7th	2015–16
Lebanon	2022 Lebanese Elite Cup	Al Ahed	2–1	Al Ansar	6th	2015
Lebanon	2022 Lebanese Challenge Cup	Akhaa Ahli Aley	1–0	Safa	1st	
Lebanon	2022 Lebanese Super Cup					
Macau	2022 Taça de Macau					
Malaysia	2022 Piala Sumbangsih	Johor Darul Ta'zim	3–0	Kuala Lumpur City	7th	2021
Malaysia	2022 Malaysia FA Cup	Johor Darul Ta'zim	3–1	Terengganu	2nd	2016
Malaysia	2022 Malaysia Cup	Johor Darul Ta'zim	2–1	Selangor	3rd	2019
Malaysia	2022 Malaysia Challenge Cup					
Maldives	2022 Maldives FA Cup					
Maldives	2022 Maldivian FA Charity Shield					
Mongolia	2022 MFF Tsom Cup					
Mongolia	2022 MFF Super Cup	Deren	2–0	Athletic 220	1st	—
Myanmar	2022 MFF Charity Cup					
North Korea	2022 Hwaebul Cup					
Oman	2021–22 Sultan Qaboos Cup	Al-Seeb Club	2–0	Al-Rustaq Club	4th	1998
Oman	2021–22 Oman Professional League Cup	Bahla Club	1–1 (6–5 p)	Oman Club	1st	—
Oman	2022 Oman Super Cup					
Pakistan	2022 PFF National Challenge Cup					
Palestine	2021–22 Palestine Cup					
Philippines	2022 Copa Paulino Alcantara	United City	3–2	Kaya	1st	—
Qatar	2022 Emir of Qatar Cup	Al-Duhail SC	5–1	Al-Gharafa SC	4th	2019
Qatar	2022 Qatar Cup					
Qatar	2021–22 Qatari Stars Cup	Al-Sailiya	5–4	Al-Wakrah	2nd	2020–21
Qatar	2022 Qatari Sheikh Jassim Cup					
Saudi Arabia	2021–22 King Cup	Al-Fayha	1–1 (3–1 p)	Al Hilal	1st	—
Saudi Arabia	2022 Saudi Super Cup	Al-Ittihad	2–0	Al-Fayha	1st	–
Singapore	2022 Singapore Cup	Hougang United	3–2	Tampines Rovers	1st	–
Singapore	2022 Singapore Community Shield	Lion City Sailors	2–1	Albirex Niigata Singapore	2nd	2019
South Korea	2022 Korean FA Cup	Jeonbuk Hyundai Motors	2–2; 3–1 5–3 (agg)	Seoul	5th	2020
Sri Lanka	2022 Sri Lanka FA Cup					
Syria	2021–22 Syrian Cup					
Syria	2022 Syrian Super Cup					
Tajikistan	2022 Tajikistan Cup					
Tajikistan	2022 TFF Cup					
Tajikistan	2022 Tajik Super Cup	FC Istiklol	1–0	FC Khujand	11th	2021
Thailand	2021–22 Thai FA Cup	Buriram United	1–0 (a.e.t.)	Nakhon Ratchasima	5th	2015
Thailand	2021–22 Thai League Cup	Buriram United	4–0	PT Prachuap	6th	2016
Thailand	2022 Thailand Champions Cup	Pathum United	3–2	Buriram United	2020	
Timor-Leste	2022 Taça 12 de Novembro					
Timor-Leste	2022 LFA Super Taça					
Turkmenistan	2022 Turkmenistan Cup					
Turkmenistan	2022 Turkmenistan Super Cup					
United Arab Emirates	2021–22 UAE President's Cup	Sharjah	1–0	Al Wahda	9th	2002–03
United Arab Emirates	2021–22 UAE League Cup	Al Ain	2–2 (5–4 p)	Shabab Al Ahli	2nd	2008–09
United Arab Emirates	2022 UAE Super Cup					
Uzbekistan	2022 Uzbekistan Cup	Nasaf	2–1 (a.e.t.)	Navbahor	3rd	2021
Uzbekistan	2022 Uzbekistan Super Cup	Pakhtakor	1–0	FC Nasaf	2nd	2021
Vietnam	2022 Vietnamese Cup	Hanoi	2–0	Binh Dinh	3rd	2020
Vietnam	2022 Vietnamese Super Cup					

=== CAF ===
Nation	Tournament	Champion	Final score	Second place	Title	Last honour
Angola	2021–22 Angola Cup					
Angola	2022–23 Angola Super Cup					
Botswana	2022 FA Challenge Cup					
Botswana	2021–22 Mascom Top 8 Cup					
Burkina Faso	2022 Coupe du Faso	AS Douanes	1–0	US de la Comoé	1st	—
Burkina Faso	2022 Burkinabé SuperCup					
Burundi	2021–22 Coupe du Président de la République					
Burundi	2022 Coupe de l'Unité					
Cameroon	2022 Cameroonian Cup					
Cameroon	2022 Super Coupe Roger Milla					
Cape Verde	2022 Taça Nacional de Cabo Verde					
Cape Verde	2022 Cape Verdean Independence Cup					
Cape Verde	2022 Supertaça de Cabo Verde					
Central African Republic	2022 Central African Republic Coupe Nationale					
Comoros	2022 Comoros Cup					
Djibouti	2021–22 Djibouti Cup					
Djibouti	2022 Djibouti Super Cup					
(Republic of the Congo) Congo	2022 Coupe du Congo					
(Democratic Republic of the Congo) DR Congo	2022 Coupe du Congo					
Egypt	2021–22 Egypt Cup					
Egypt	2021–22 Egyptian League Cup					
Egypt	2021–22 Egyptian Super Cup					
Equatorial Guinea	2022 Equatoguinean Cup					
Eswatini	2022 Swazi Cup					
Ethiopia	2022 Ethiopian Cup					
Ethiopia	2022 Ethiopian Super Cup					
Ghana	2021–22 Ghanaian FA Cup					
Guinea-Bissau	2022 Taça Nacional da Guiné Bissau					
Ivory Coast	2022 Coupe de Côte d'Ivoire					
Kenya	2022 FKF President's Cup					
Kenya	2022 FKF Super Cup					
Liberia	2021–22 Liberian FA Cup					
Liberia	2022 Liberian Super Cup					
Madagascar	2022 Coupe de Madagascar					
Malawi	2022 FDH Bank Knockout Cup					
Mali	2022 Malian Cup	Djoliba AC	2–0	Real Bamako	20th	2009
Mauritania	2022 Mauritanian President's Cup	Nouakchott Kings	2–2 (a.e.t.) (4–2 p)	FC Nouadhibou	2nd	2013
Mauritius	2022 Mauritian Cup					
Mauritius	2021-22 Mauritian Republic Cup					
Morocco	2021–22 Moroccan Throne Cup	RS Berkane	1–1 (a.e.t.) (5–4 p)	Raja CA	3rd	2020–21
Mozambique	2022 Taça de Moçambique					
Niger	2022 Niger Cup					
Nigeria	2022 Aiteo Cup					
Rwanda	2022 Rwandan Cup					
Senegal	2022 Senegal FA Cup					
Senegal	2022 Senegalese League Cup					
Senegal	2021–22 Coupe du Haut Conseil des collectivités territoriales	ASC HLM	1–0	Ascase FC	2nd	2019–20
Seychelles	2022 Seychelles FA Cup					
Seychelles	2022 Seychelles Presidents Cup					
Somalia	2022 Somalia Cup					
South Africa	2021–22 Nedbank Cup	Mamelodi Sundowns	2–1 (a.e.t.)	Marumo Gallants	6th	2019–20
South Africa	2022 MTN 8					
South Sudan	2022 South Sudan Cup	Al-Hilal Wau	2–0	Zalan	1st	—
Sudan	2021–22 Sudan Cup					
Tanzania	2021–22 Tanzania FA Cup					
Tanzania	2022 Tanzania Community Shield					
Togo	2022 Coupe du Togo					
Togo	2022 Supercoupe du Togo					
Tunisia	2021–22 Tunisian Cup	CS Sfaxien	2–0	AS Marsa	7th	2020–21
Tunisia	2022 Tunisian Super Cup					
Uganda	2021–22 Uganda Cup	Bul	3–1	Vipers	1st	—
Uganda	2021–22 Masaza Cup					
Zambia	2022 Zambian ABSA Cup	NAPSA Stars	1–0	Red Arrows	2nd	2012
Zambia	2022 Zambian Charity Shield					
Zanzibar	2022 Zanzibar FA Cup					
Zanzibar	2022 Mapinduzi Cup	Simba	1–0	Azam	3rd	2015
Zimbabwe	2022 Chibuku Cup					
Zimbabwe	2022 Zimbabwean Charity Shield					
Zimbabwe	2022 Uhuru Cup	Highlanders	1–0	Dynamos	1st	—

=== CONCACAF ===
Nation	Tournament	Champion	Final score	Second place	Title	Last honour
Aruba	2021–22 Torneo Copa Betico Croes	RCA	1–0	La Fama	3rd	2015–16
Barbados	2022 Barbados FA Cup					
Barbados	2022 Capellisport Super Cup					
Bermuda	2022 Bermuda FA Cup	Dandy Town Hornets	3–2	PHC Zebras	5th	2014–15
Bermuda	2021–22 Friendship Trophy	Devonshire Cougars	3–2	Dandy Town Hornets	3rd	2012–13
Bermuda	2021–22 Shield Trophy	Wolves Sports Club	3–2	MSC Bluebirds	—	—
Canada	2022 Canadian Championship	Vancouver Whitecaps FC	1–1 (a.e.t.) (5–3 p)	Toronto FC	2nd	2015
Cayman Islands	2021–22 Cayman Islands FA Cup					
Cayman Islands	2021–22 Cayman Islands President's Cup					
Costa Rica	2022 Costa Rica Super Cup					
Dominica	2022 Dominica Nations Cup					
El Salvador	2021–22 Copa El Salvador					
Grenada	2022 GFA Super Knockout Cup					
Guadeloupe	2022 Coupe de Guadeloupe					
Guatemala	2021–22 Copa de Guatemala					
Mexico	2021–22 Copa MX					
Mexico	2022 Supercopa MX					
Mexico	2022 Campeón de Campeones					
Nicaragua	2022 Copa de Nicaragua					
Saint Kitts and Nevis	2021–22 Saint Kitts and Nevis National Cup					
Suriname	2021–22 SVB Cup					
Suriname	2021 Suriname President's Cup					
Turks and Caicos Islands	2022 Turks Head Cup					
United States	2022 U.S. Open Cup	Orlando City SC	3–0	Sacramento Republic FC	1st	—

=== CONMEBOL ===
Nation	Tournament	Champion	Final score	Second place	Title	Last honour
Argentina	2021–22 Copa Argentina	Patronato	1–0	Talleres (C)	1st	—
Argentina	2022 Supercopa Argentina	Boca Juniors	3–0	Patronato	2nd	2018
Argentina	2022 Copa de la Liga Profesional	Boca Juniors	3–0	Tigre	2nd	2020
Bolivia	2022 Copa Bolivia	Tournament cancelled				
Brazil	2022 Copa do Brasil	Flamengo	1–1 (6–5 p)	Corinthians	4th	2013
Brazil	2022 Supercopa do Brasil	Atlético Mineiro	2–2 (8–7 p)	Flamengo	1st	—
Chile	2022 Copa Chile	Magallanes	2–2 (7–6 p)	Unión Española	1st	—
Chile	2022 Supercopa de Chile	Colo-Colo	2–0	Universidad Católica	3rd	2018
Colombia	2022 Copa Colombia	Millonarios	2–1	Junior	3rd	2011
Colombia	2022 Superliga Colombiana	Deportes Tolima	2–1	Deportivo Cali	1st	—
Ecuador	2022 Copa Ecuador	Independiente del Valle	3–1	9 de Octubre	1st	—
Ecuador	2022 Supercopa Ecuador	Not held				
Paraguay	2022 Copa Paraguay	Sportivo Ameliano	1–1 (4–3 p)	Nacional	1st	—
Paraguay	2022 Supercopa Paraguay	Sportivo Ameliano	1–0	Olimpia	1st	—
Peru	2022 Copa Bicentenario	Tournament cancelled				
Peru	2022 Supercopa Peruana	Tournament cancelled				
Uruguay	2022 Copa Uruguay	Defensor Sporting	1–0	La Luz	1st	—
Uruguay	2022 Supercopa Uruguaya	Peñarol	1–0 (a.e.t.)	Plaza Colonia	2nd	2018

=== OFC ===
Nation	Tournament	Champion	Final score	Second place	Title	Last honour
Cook Islands	2022 Cook Islands Cup					
Fiji	2022 Fiji Interdistrict Championship					
Fiji	2022 Fiji FF Cup	Suva	2–0	Labasa	4th	2020
New Caledonia	2022 Coupe de Calédonie					
New Zealand	2022 Chatham Cup	Auckland City	1–0	Eastern Suburbs	1st	—
(French Polynesia) Tahiti	2022 Tahiti Cup					
Tonga	2022 Tonga Cup					
Tuvalu	2022 NBT Cup					
Tuvalu	2022 Tuvalu Independence Cup					
Tuvalu	2022 Christmas Cup					

=== Non-FIFA ===
Nation	Tournament	Champion	Final score	Second place	Title	Last honour
Channel Islands	2021–22 Guernsey FA Cup					
(Autonomous Republic of Crimea) Crimea	2022 Crimean Football Union Cup					
Gozo	2021–22 G.F.A. Cup					
Isle of Man	2021–22 Isle of Man FA Cup					
Mayotte	2022 Super Coupe de Mayotte	FC Mtsapéré	2–0	AJM Jumeaux de Mzouasia	1st	—
Monaco	2022 Challenge Prince Rainier III	Carabiniers du Prince FC	1–1 (4–3 p)	Vinci Construction Monaco	1st	—
Monaco	2022 Trophée Ville de Monaco	Sûreté Publique	1–1 (4–3 p)	M.I. Monaco S.A.M.	5th	2019
Northern Cyprus	2022 Cypriot Cup					
Orkney	2022 Parish Cup					
Saint Helena	2022 Knockout Cup					
Scilly Islands	2022 Scilly Islands Charity Shield					
Tibet	2022 GCMGC Gold Cup					
Vatican City	2022 Clericus Cup					

== Women's leagues ==
=== UEFA ===
Nation	League	Champion	Second place	Title	Last honour
Albania	2021–22 Albanian Women's National Championship	Vllaznia	Apolonia	9th	2020–21
Austria	2021–22 ÖFB-Frauenliga	SKN St. Pölten	SK Sturm Graz	6th	2018–19
Belarus	2022 Belarusian Premier League	Dinamo Minsk	FC Minsk	3rd	2021
Belgium	2021–22 Belgian Women's Super League				
Bosnia and Herzegovina	2021–22 Bosnia and Herzegovina Women's Premier League				
Bulgaria	2021–22 Bulgarian women's football championship				
Croatia	2021–22 Croatian Women's First Football League	Split	Osijek	3rd	2019–20
Cyprus	2021–22 Cypriot First Division				
Czech Republic	2021–22 Czech Women's First League	Slavia Prague	Sparta Prague	8th	2019–20
Denmark	2021–22 Danish Women's League	HB Køge	Fortuna Hjørring	2nd	2020–21
England	2021–22 FA WSL	Chelsea	Arsenal	5th	2020–21
Estonia	2022 Naiste Meistriliiga	Flora		5th	2021
Faroe Islands	2022 1. deild kvinnur	KÍ		22nd	2021
Finland	2022 Kansallinen Liiga	KuPS		2nd	2021
France	2021–22 Division 1 Féminine	Lyon	Paris Saint-Germain	15th	2019–20
(Georgia (country)) Georgia	2022 Georgia women's football championship	Samegrelo Chkhorotsku		1st	—
Germany	2021–22 Frauen-Bundesliga	VfL Wolfsburg	Bayern Munich	7th	2019–20
Gibraltar	2021–22 Gibraltar Women's Football League				
Greece	2022 Greek A Division				
Hungary	2021–22 Női NB I	Ferencváros	Győri ETO	5th	2020–21
Iceland	2022 Úrvalsdeild kvenna				
(Republic of Ireland) Ireland	2022 Women's National League	Shelbourne	Athlone Town	3rd	2021
Israel	2021–22 Ligat Nashim				
Italy	2021–22 Serie A	Juventus	AS Roma	5th	2020–21
Kazakhstan	2022 Kazakhstani women's football championship				
Kosovo	2021–22 Kosovo Women's Football League				
Latvia	2022 Latvian Women's League	SFK Rīga		1st	—
Lithuania	2022 A-Lyga				
Luxembourg	2021–22 Dames Ligue 1				
Malta	2021–22 Maltese First Division				
Moldova	2021–22 Moldovan Women Top League	FC Maksimum Cahul	Agarista-ȘS Anenii Noi	1st	—
Montenegro	2021–22 Montenegrin Women's League				
Netherlands	2021–22 Eredivisie	Twente	Ajax	8th	2020–21
North Macedonia	2021–22 Macedonian women's football championship				
Northern Ireland	2022 Women's Premiership	Cliftonville	Glentoran	1st	—
Norway	2022 Toppserien				
Poland	2021–22 Ekstraliga	UKS SMS Łódź	Górnik Łęczna	1st	—
Portugal	2021–22 Campeonato Nacional de Futebol Feminino				
Romania	2021–22 Liga I				
Russia	2022 Russian Championship				
Scotland	2021–22 Scottish Women's Premier League	Rangers	Glasgow City	1st	—
Serbia	2021–22 Serbian SuperLiga				
Slovakia	2021–22 Slovak Women's First League				
Slovenia	2021–22 Slovenian Women's League				
Spain	2021–22 Primera División	Barcelona	Real Sociedad	7th	2020–21
Sweden	2022 Damallsvenskan				
Switzerland	2021–22 Swiss Women's Super League	FC Zürich	Servette	23rd	2018–19
Turkey	2021–22 Turkcell Women's Football League	ALG Spor	Fatih Karagümrük	2nd	2019–20
Ukraine	2021–22 Vyshcha Liha	Season abandoned due to the Russian invasion of Ukraine			
Wales	2021–22 Welsh Premier League				

=== AFC ===
Nation	League	Champion	Second place	Title	Last honour
Afghanistan	2022 Afghan Women's Premier League				
Australia	2021–22 A-League Women (Note: League renamed from W-League after the 2020–21 season.)	Melbourne Victory FC (Note: In A-League Women (as well as its male counterpart of A-League Men), the term "champions" refers to the winner of the playoff tournament (known in Australian English as the "finals series") that follows the league season. The team that tops the league table is designated "premiers". This usage of "premiers" differs from other football codes in the country, which use that term to describe what the A-Leagues call "champions".)	Sydney FC	3rd	2020–21
Bangladesh	2021–22 Bangladesh Women's Football League				
Bhutan	2022 Kelme-Bhutan Women's National League				
Cambodia	2022 Cambodia Women's Football League				
China	2022 Chinese Women's Super League				
Chinese Taipei	2022 Taiwan Mulan Football League				
Guam	2021–22 Guam Women Soccer League				
Hong Kong	2021–22 Hong Kong Women League				
India	2021–22 Indian Women's Super League				
Iran	2021–22 Kowsar Women Football League				
Iraq	2021–22 Iraqi Women's Football League				
Japan	2021–22 WE League (Note: Replaced the top level of the Nadeshiko League as Japan's top league after the 2021 season. The Nadeshiko League now occupies the two levels below the WE League.)	INAC Kobe Leonessa	Urawa Red Diamonds Ladies	1st	—
Jordan	2022 Jordan Women's Football League				
South Korea	2022 WK League				
Kyrgyzstan	2022 Kyrgyzstan Women's Championship				
Laos	2022 Laos Women's League				
Lebanon	2021–22 Lebanese Women's Football League				
Mongolia	2022 Women's National Football League				
Myanmar	2021–22 Myanmar Women League				
Nepal	2022 National Women's League				
North Korea	2021–22 DPR Korea Women's Football League				
Pakistan	2022 National Women Football Championship				
Palestine	2021–22 Palestine Women's League				
Thailand	2022 Thai Women's League				
(Timor-Leste) East Timor	2022 Palmares Women				
Uzbekistan	2022 Uzbek women's football championship				
Vietnam	2022 Vietnam Women's Football League				

=== CAF ===
Nation	League	Champion	Second place	Title	Last honour
Algeria	2021–22 Algerian Women's Championship				
Ethiopia	2021–22 Ethiopian Women's Premier League				
Ghana	2021–22 Ghana Women's Premier League				
Kenya	2022 Kenya Women's Football League				
Malawi	2022 FAM Women's Football League				
Morocco	2021–22 Moroccan Women's Championship	AS FAR	AMFFL	9	2021
Namibia	2021–22 Namibia Women's Super League				
Nigeria	2021–22 NWFL Premiership	Bayelsa Queens	Nasarawa Amazons	5th	2018
South Africa	2022 ABSA Women's League				
Tunisia	2021–22 Tunisian Women's Championship				
Uganda	2022 FUFA Women Super League				

=== CONCACAF ===
Nation	League	Champion	Second place	Title	Last honour
Belize	2021–22 National Women’s Football League				
El Salvador	2022 Salvadoran women's football championship				
Guatemala	2022 National Women's Football League Clausura				
Guatemala	2022 National Women's Football League Apertura				
Mexico	2022 Liga MX Femenil Clausura	Guadalajara	Pachuca	2nd	2017 Apertura
Mexico	2022 Liga MX Femenil Apertura	UANL	América	5th	2021 Guard1anes
United States	2022 NWSL season	Portland Thorns FC	Kansas City Current	3rd	2017

=== CONMEBOL ===
Nation	League	Champion	Second place	Title	Last honour
Argentina	2022 Campeonato de Fútbol Femenino Apertura				
Argentina	2022 Campeonato de Fútbol Femenino Clausura				
Bolivia	2022 Copa Simón Bolívar Femenina				
Brazil	2022 Campeonato Brasileiro de Futebol Feminino Série A1	Corinthians	Internacional	4th	2021
Chile	2022 Chilean women's football championship				
Colombia	2022 Liga Femenina Profesional	América de Cali	Deportivo Cali	2nd	2019
Ecuador	2022 SuperLiga Femenina				
Paraguay	2022 Paraguayan women's football championship				
Peru	2022 Liga Femenina				
Uruguay	2022 Women's Uruguayan Championship				
Venezuela	2022 Liga FUTVE Fem				

=== OFC ===
Nation	League	Champion	Second place	Title	Last honour
New Zealand	2022 Women's National League	Eastern Suburbs	Western Springs	1st	—
Solomon Islands	2022 Women's Premier League				

== Women's domestic cups ==
=== UEFA ===
Nation	Tournament	Champion	Final score	Second place	Title	Last honor
Albania	2021–22 Albanian Women's Cup					
Austria	2021–22 ÖFB Ladies Cup	SKN St. Pölten	2–0	SK Sturm Graz	6th	2017
Belarus	2021–22 Belarusian Women's Cup					
Belarus	2022 Belarus Women's Super Cup	FC Dinamo BGUFK	2–1	FC Minsk	2nd	2021
Belgium	2022 Belgian Women's Cup	Anderlecht	3–0	Standard Liège	11th	2013
Bosnia and Herzegovina	2022 Bosnia and Herzegovina Women's Football Cup					
Bulgaria	2021–22 Bulgarian Women's Cup					
Croatia	2021–22 Croatian Women's Football Cup	ŽNK Split	1–0	ŽNK Osijek	4th	2020–21
Cyprus	2021–22 Cypriot Women's Cup					
Czech Republic	2021–22 Czech Women's Cup	SK Slavia Prague	2–0	Sparta Prague	3rd	2016
Denmark	2021–22 Danish Women's Cup	Fortuna Hjørring	3–1	FC Thy-Thisted Q	10th	2019
England	2021–22 Women's FA Cup	Chelsea	3–2 (a.e.t.)	Manchester City	4th	2020–21
England	2022 Women's FA Community Shield					
England	2021–22 FA Women's League Cup	Manchester City	3–1	Chelsea	4th	2018–19
Estonia	2022 Estonian Women's Cup					
Estonia	2022 Estonian Women's Supercup					
Faroe Islands	2022 Faroese Women's Cup					
Faroe Islands	2022 Faroese Women's Super Cup	NSÍ Runavík	0–0 (4–2 p)	KÍ Klaksvík	1st	—
Finland	2022 Finnish Women's Cup	Åland United	vs	HJK Helsinki		
France	2022 Coupe de France féminine	Paris Saint-Germain	8–0	Yzeure	3rd	2017–18
France	2022 Trophée des Championnes	Lyon	1–0	Paris Saint-Germain	2nd	2019
Germany	2021–22 DFB-Pokal Frauen	VfL Wolfsburg	4–0	Turbine Potsdam	9th	2020–21
Gibraltar	2022 Women's Rock Cup					
Hungary	2022 Hungarian Women's Cup	Győri ETO FC	1–0	Viktória FC-Szombathely	1st	—
Iceland	2022 Icelandic Women's Football Cup					
Iceland	2022 Icelandic Women's League cup					
Iceland	2022 Icelandic Women's Supercup					
(Republic of Ireland) Ireland	2022 FAI Women's Cup					
Israel	2021–22 Israeli Women's Cup	FC Kiryat Gat	2–0	Bnot Netanya	3rd	2020–21
Italy	2021–22 Italian Women's Cup	Juventus	2–1	AS Roma	2nd	2018–19
Italy	2022 Italian Women's Super Cup					
Latvia	2022 Latvian Women's Cup					
Luxembourg	2021–22 Luxembourg Women's Cup					
Malta	2021–22 Maltese Women's Cup					
Moldova	2021–22 Moldovan Women's Cup	Agarista Anenii Noi	3-0	Noroc Nimoreni	4th	2019–20
Netherlands	2021–22 KNVB Women's Cup	Ajax	2–1	PSV	5th	2018–19
Netherlands	2021–22 Eredivisie Cup	FC Twente	4–3	Ajax	2nd	2019–20
Northern Ireland	2022 IFA Women's Challenge Cup					
Norway	2022 Norwegian Women's Cup					
Poland	2021–22 Polish Women's Cup	Czarni Sosnowiec	4–0	Śląsk Wrocław	13th	2020–21
Portugal	2021–22 Taça de Portugal Feminina					
Portugal	2022 Taça da Liga Feminina					
Portugal	2022 Supertaça de Portugal Feminina					
Romania	2021–22 Cupa României	U Olimpia Cluj	6–2	Heniu Prundu Bârgăului	8th	2020–21
Russia	2022 Russian Women's Cup					
Russia	2022 Russian Women's Super Cup					
Scotland	2021–22 Scottish Women's Cup	Celtic	3–2 (a.e.t.)	Glasgow City	1st	—
Serbia	2022 Serbian Women's Cup					
Slovakia	2022 Slovak Women's Cup	Slovan Bratislava	1–0	MŠK Žilina	6th	2018
Slovenia	2021–22 Slovenian Women's Cup	ŽNK Olimpija	1–0	ŽNK Ljubljana	2nd	2020–21
Spain	2021–22 Copa de la Reina de Fútbol	FC Barcelona	6–1	Sporting de Huelva	9th	2020–21
Spain	2021–22 Supercopa de España Femenina	FC Barcelona	7–0	Atlético Madrid	2nd	2019–20
Sweden	2021–22 Svenska Cupen	FC Rosengård	2–1 (a.e.t.)	BK Häcken FF	6th	2017–18
Switzerland	2022 Swiss Women's Cup	Zürich Frauen	4–1	Grasshopper Club Zürich	7th	2019
Ukraine	2021–22 Ukrainian Women's Cup					

=== AFC ===
Nation	Tournament	Champion	Final score	Second place	Title	Last honour
China	2022 Chinese FA Women's Cup					
China	2022 Chinese FA Women's Super Cup					
China	2022 Chinese Women's Football Championship	Changchun Dazhong Zhuoyue	3–0	Beijing	2nd	2021
Japan	2022 Empress's Cup	Urawa Reds Ladies	1–0	JEF United Chiba Ladies	1st	—
Japan	2022 Nadeshiko League Cup					
Lebanon	2021–22 Lebanese Women's FA Cup					
Malaysia	2022 Piala Tun Sharifah Rodziah					
Philippines	2022 PFF Women's Cup	Far Eastern University	2–0	University of the Philippines	3rd	2015

=== CAF ===
Nation	Tournament	Champion	Final score	Second place	Title	Last honour
Algeria	2021–22 Algerian Women's Cup					
Algeria	2021–22 Algerian Women's League Cup					
Algeria	2022 Algerian Women's Super Cup					
Burkina Faso	2022 Coupe du Faso Féminine					
Burkina Faso	2022 Super Coupe Féminine					
Liberia	2022 Liberia Women Cup					
Morocco	2022 Moroccan Women Throne Cup	AS FAR	8–0	USSB	10th	2021
Nigeria	2022 Aiteo Cup					
Nigeria	2022 Nigeria Women's Super Cup					
Réunion	2022 Réunion Women Cup					
Senegal	2022 Senegal Women Cup					

=== CONCACAF ===
Nation	Tournament	Champion	Final score	Second place	Title	Last honour
United States	2022 NWSL Challenge Cup	North Carolina Courage	2–1	Washington Spirit	1st	–

=== CONMEBOL ===
Nation	Tournament	Champion	Final score	Second place	Title	Last honour
Argentina	2021–22 Copa Federal de Fútbol Femenino					
Brazil	2022 Supercopa do Brasil de Futebol Feminino	Corinthians	1–0	Grêmio	1st	—

=== OFC ===
Nation	Tournament	Champion	Final score	Second place	Title	Last honour
New Zealand	2022 Kate Sheppard Cup	Auckland United	1–0	Northern Rovers	1st	—

== Second, third, fourth, and fifth leagues ==
=== UEFA ===
Nation	League	Champion	Second place	Title	Last honour
Albania	2021–22 Kategoria e Parë	Bylis	Erzeni	5th	2018–19
Albania	2021–22 Kategoria e Dytë	(Group A) Luzi i Vogël 2008	Oriku	1st	—
Albania	2021–22 Kategoria e Dytë	(Group B) Flamurtari	Labëria	1st	—
Albania	2021–22 Kategoria e Tretë	AF Elbasani	Valbona	1st	—
Andorra	2021–22 Segona Divisió	Penya Encarnada	La Massana		
Armenia	2021–22 Armenian First League	Lernayin Artsakh	Shirak		
Austria	2021–22 Austrian Football Second League	Austria Lustenau	Floridsdorfer AC	2nd	1996–97
Austria	2021–22 Austrian Regionalliga	First Vienna FC	SK Sturm Graz II		
Azerbaijan	2021–22 Azerbaijan First Division	Qaradağ Lökbatan	Kapaz		
Belarus	2022 Belarusian First League	Naftan Novopolotsk	Smorgon		
Belarus	2022 Belarusian Second League	Niva	Krumkachy		
Belgium	2021–22 Belgian First Division B	Westerlo	RWDM47	2nd	2013–14
Belgium	2021–22 Belgian National Division 1	Dender EH	RFC Liège		
Belgium	2021–22 Belgian Division 2	(VFV A) Petegem	Ninove		
Belgium	2021–22 Belgian Division 2	(VFV B) Hoogstraten	Aalst		
Belgium	2021–22 Belgian Division 2	(VFV C) La Louvière	Meux		
Belgium	2021–22 Belgian Division 3	(VFV A) Oostkamp	Lebbeke		
Belgium	2021–22 Belgian Division 3	(VFV B) Racing Mechelen	Esperanza Pelt		
Belgium	2021–22 Belgian Division 3	(VFV C) Namur FLV	Manageoise		
Belgium	2021–22 Belgian Division 3	(VFV D) Dison	Rochefort		
Bosnia and Herzegovina	2021–22 First League of the Federation of Bosnia and Herzegovina	Igman	GOŠK		
Bosnia and Herzegovina	2021–22 First League of the Republika Srpska	Sloga	Krupa		
Bosnia and Herzegovina	2021–22 Second League of the Republika Srpska	West FK Laktaši	Sloboda Mrkonjić Grad	2nd	2003–04
Bosnia and Herzegovina	2021–22 Second League of the Republika Srpska	Istok Sloga Gornje Crnjelovo	FK Famos Vojkovići		
Bulgaria	2021–22 Second Professional Football League	Septemvri Sofia	Hebar Pazardzhik		
Bulgaria	2021–22 Third Amateur Football League	Dunav Ruse; FC Krumovgrad; Spartak Pleven; Belasitsa Petrich	Chernolomets Popovo; Sayana Haskovo; Sevlievo; Vitosha Bistritsa		
Croatia	2021–22 Croatian Second Football League	Varaždin	Rudeš	2nd	2018-19
Croatia	2021–22 Croatian Third Football League	(West) Crikvenica (Central) Zagorec Krapina (North) Polet (SMnM) (East) Vukovar 1991 (South) Jadran Luka Ploče	Jadran Poreč; Dugo Selo; Mladost Ždralovi; Zrinski Jurjevac; Hrvatski Vitez Posedarje		
Croatia	2021–22 Croatian Fourth Division	(Četvrta NL Rijeka) Medulin 1921	Kraljevica		
Croatia	2021–22 Croatian Fourth Division	(Četvrta NL Zagreb A) Dinamo OO	Brezovica		
Croatia	2021–22 Croatian Fourth Division	(Četvrta NL Zagreb B) Samobor	Sava Strmec		
Croatia	2021–22 Croatian Fourth Division	(Četvrta NL Čakovec-Varaždin) Bednja Beletinec	Nedeljanec		
Croatia	2021–22 Croatian Fourth Division	(Četvrta NL Bjelovar-Koprivnica-Virovitica) Tehničar 1974	Pitomača		
Croatia	2021–22 Croatian Fourth Division	(MŽNL Osijek-Vinkovci) Valpovka	Borac KV		
Croatia	2021–22 Croatian Fourth Division	(MŽNL Brod-Požega) Svačić	Tomislav DA		
Croatia	2021–22 Croatian Fifth Division	(First League of Istria County) Banjole	Ližnjan		
Croatia	2021–22 Croatian Fifth Division	(First League of Primorje-Gorski Kotar County) Draga Mošćenička Draga	Rikard Benčić Rijeka		
Croatia	2021–22 Croatian Fifth Division	(League of Lika-Senj County) Velebit Žabica	Sokolac Brinje		
Croatia	2021–22 Croatian Fifth Division	(First League of Zagreb) Sesvetski Kraljevec	Devetka Zagreb		
Croatia	2021–22 Croatian Fifth Division	(JŽNL Zagreb County) Naftaš Ivanić Grad	Ban Jelačić Vukovina		
Croatia	2021–22 Croatian Fifth Division	First League of Sisak-Moslavina County Radnik Majur	TŠK 1932 Topolovac		
Croatia	2021–22 Croatian Fifth Division	First League of Karlovac County Vojnić 95	Croatia 78 Žakanje		
Croatia	2021–22 Croatian Fifth Division	First League of Krapina-Zagorje County Rudar Dubrava Zabočka	Oroslavje		
Croatia	2021–22 Croatian Fifth Division	First League of Međimurje County Nedelišće	BSK Belica		
Croatia	2021–22 Croatian Fifth Division	First League of Varaždin County Polet Tuhovec	Novi Marof		
Croatia	2021–22 Croatian Fifth Division	First League of Bjelovar-Bilogora County Ribar Končanica	Zdenka 91 Veliki Zdenci		
Croatia	2021–22 Croatian Fifth Division	First League of Koprivnica-Križevci County Bratstvo Kunovec	Sloga Koprivnički Ivanec		
Croatia	2021–22 Croatian Fifth Division	First League of Virovitica-Podravina County Podravac Sopje	Voćin		
Croatia	2021–22 Croatian Fifth Division	First league of Osijek-Baranja County Vardarac	Jedinstvo Donji Miholjac		
Croatia	2021–22 Croatian Fifth Division	First league of Vukovar-Syrmia County Mladost Cerić	Slavonija Soljani		
Croatia	2021–22 Croatian Fifth Division	First League of Brod-Posavina County Psunj Sokol Okučani	Posavina Velika Kopanica		
Croatia	2021–22 Croatian Fifth Division	First League of Požega-Slavonia County Kaptol	BSK Buk		
Croatia	2021–22 Croatian Fifth Division	First League of Dubrovnik-Neretva County ONK Metković	Slaven Gruda		
Croatia	2021–22 Croatian Fifth Division	First League of Split-Dalmatia County GOŠK Kaštel Gomilica	Omladinac Vranjic		
Croatia	2021–22 Croatian Fifth Division	League of Šibenik-Knin County Rudar Siverić	DOŠK Drniš		
Croatia	2021–22 Croatian Fifth Division	First League of Zadar County Polača	Bibinje		
Croatia	2021–22 Croatian Fifth Division	Second League of Zadar County Zemunik	Galovac		
Cyprus	2021–22 Cypriot Second Division	Karmiotissa	New Salamina		
Cyprus	2021–22 Cypriot Third Division	Peyia 2014	MEAP Nisou		
Cyprus	2021–22 STOK Elite Division	APEA Akrotiriou	AEP Polemidion		
Czech Republic	2021–22 Czech National Football League	Brno	Vlašim		
Czech Republic	2021–22 Bohemian Football League				
Czech Republic	2021–22 Moravian–Silesian Football League				
Czech Republic	2021–22 Czech Fourth Division	(Divize A) TJ Přeštice			
Czech Republic	2021–22 Czech Fourth Division	(Divize B)			
Czech Republic	2021–22 Czech Fourth Division	(Divize C) Sparta Kolín			
Czech Republic	2021–22 Czech Fourth Division	(Divize D) FK Hodonín			
Czech Republic	2021–22 Czech Fourth Division	(Divize E)			
Czech Republic	2021–22 Czech Fourth Division	(Divize F)			
Czech Republic	2021–22 Czech Fifth Division	2021–22 Prague Championship	Újezd Praha	Dukla Jižní Město	
Czech Republic	2021–22 Czech Fifth Division	2021–22 Central Bohemia Regional Championship			
Czech Republic	2021–22 Czech Fifth Division	2021–22 South Bohemia Regional Championship			
Czech Republic	2021–22 Czech Fifth Division	2021–22 Plzeň Regional Championship			
Czech Republic	2021–22 Czech Fifth Division	2021–22 Karlovy Vary Regional Championship			
Czech Republic	2021–22 Czech Fifth Division	2021–22 Ústí nad Labem Regional Championship			
Czech Republic	2021–22 Czech Fifth Division	2021–22 Liberec Regional Championship			
Czech Republic	2021–22 Czech Fifth Division	2021–22 Hradec Králové Regional Championship			
Czech Republic	2021–22 Czech Fifth Division	2021–22 Pardubice Regional Championship			
Czech Republic	2021–22 Czech Fifth Division	2021–22 Vysočina Regional Championship			
Czech Republic	2021–22 Czech Fifth Division	2021–22 South Moravian Regional Championship			
Czech Republic	2021–22 Czech Fifth Division	2021–22 Zlín Regional Championship			
Czech Republic	2021–22 Czech Fifth Division	2021–22 Olomouc Regional Championship			
Czech Republic	2021–22 Czech Fifth Division	2021–22 Moravian-Silesian Regional Championship			
Denmark * Levels 6–8 have been omitted	2021–22 Danish 1st Division	AC Horsens	Lyngby Boldklub		
Denmark * Levels 6–8 have been omitted	2021–22 Danish 2nd Division	Næstved BK	Hillerød Fodbold		
Denmark * Levels 6–8 have been omitted	2021–22 Danish 3rd Division	FC Roskilde	BK Frem		
Denmark * Levels 6–8 have been omitted	2021–22 Denmark Series	SfB-Oure FA; Ishøj IF; AB Tårnby; Holstebro	OKS; Greve; Tårnby FF; Vejgaard B		
England * Levels 9–20 have been omitted	2021–22 EFL Championship	Fulham	Bournemouth	3rd	2000–01
England * Levels 9–20 have been omitted	2021–22 EFL League One	Wigan Athletic	Rotherham United	4th	2017–18
England * Levels 9–20 have been omitted	2021–22 EFL League Two	Forest Green Rovers	Exeter City	1st	—
England * Levels 9–20 have been omitted	2021–22 National League	(National) Stockport County	Wrexham	1st	—
England * Levels 9–20 have been omitted	2021–22 National League	(North) Gateshead	Brackley Town	1st	—
England * Levels 9–20 have been omitted	2021–22 National League	(South) Maidstone United	Dorking Wanderers	1st	—
England * Levels 9–20 have been omitted	2021–22 Northern Premier League	(Premier Division) Buxton	South Shields	1st	—
England * Levels 9–20 have been omitted	2021–22 Northern Premier League	(Division One West) Warrington Rylands 1906	Workington	1st	—
England * Levels 9–20 have been omitted	2021–22 Northern Premier League	(Division One East) Liversedge	Marske United	1st	—
England * Levels 9–20 have been omitted	2021–22 Northern Premier League	(Division One Midlands) Ilkeston Town	Stamford	1st	—
England * Levels 9–20 have been omitted	2021–22 Southern Football League	(Premier Division Central) Banbury United	Peterborough Sports	1st	—
England * Levels 9–20 have been omitted	2021–22 Southern Football League	(Premier Division South) Taunton Town	Hayes & Yeading United	1st	—
England * Levels 9–20 have been omitted	2021–22 Southern Football League	(Division One Central) Bedford Town	Berkhamsted	3rd	1974–75 (North)
England * Levels 9–20 have been omitted	2021–22 Southern Football League	(Division One South) Plymouth Parkway	Frome Town	1st	—
England * Levels 9–20 have been omitted	2021–22 Isthmian League	(Premier) Worthing	Bishop's Stortford	1st	—
England * Levels 9–20 have been omitted	2021–22 Isthmian League	(North) Aveley	Canvey Island	2nd	2008–09
England * Levels 9–20 have been omitted	2021–22 Isthmian League	(South Central) Bracknell Town	Chertsey Town	1st	—
England * Levels 9–20 have been omitted	2021–22 Isthmian League	(South East) Hastings United	Ashford United	1st	—
Estonia * Level 5 has been omitted	2022 Esiliiga	Harju	Elva		
Estonia * Level 5 has been omitted	2022 Esiliiga B	Tabasalu	Tallinn		
Estonia * Level 5 has been omitted	2022 II liiga				
Faroe Islands	2022 1. deild	ÍF	TB Tvøroyri		
Faroe Islands	2022 2. deild	B68 Toftir II	EB/Streymur		
Faroe Islands	2022 3. deild				
Finland * Levels 5–8 have been omitted	2022 Ykkönen	KTP	TPS		
Finland * Levels 5–8 have been omitted	2022 Kakkonen	(Group A) KäPa	JIPPO		
Finland * Levels 5–8 have been omitted	2022 Kakkonen	(Group B) SalPa	FC Honka		
Finland * Levels 5–8 have been omitted	2022 Kakkonen	(Group C) JJK	VIFK		
France * Levels 5–17 have been omitted	2021–22 Ligue 2	Toulouse	Ajaccio	3rd	2002–03
France * Levels 5–17 have been omitted	2021–22 Championnat National	Stade Lavallois	Annecy	1st	—
France * Levels 5–17 have been omitted	2021–22 Championnat National 2	Versailles; Paris 13 Atletico; Martigues; Le Puy	Lorient (res); Fleury; Grasse; Bergerac		
(Georgia (country)) Georgia * Levels 4–5 have been omitted	2022 Erovnuli Liga 2	Shukura Kobuleti	Spaeri		
(Georgia (country)) Georgia * Levels 4–5 have been omitted	2022 Liga 3	Kolkheti 1913	Dinamo-2		
Germany * Level 6 has been omitted	2021–22 2. Bundesliga	Schalke 04	Werder Bremen	3rd	1990–91
Germany * Level 6 has been omitted	2021–22 3. Liga	Magdeburg	Eintracht Braunschweig	2nd	2017–18
Germany * Level 6 has been omitted	2021–22 Regionalliga	(Nord) VfB Oldenburg	Weiche Flensburg	2nd	1995–96
Germany * Level 6 has been omitted	2021–22 Regionalliga	(Nordost) BFC Dynamo	Carl Zeiss Jena	1st	—
Germany * Level 6 has been omitted	2021–22 Regionalliga	(Südwest) Elversberg	SSV Ulm	2nd	2016–17
Germany * Level 6 has been omitted	2021–22 Regionalliga	(West) Rot-Weiss Essen	Preußen Münster	1st	—
Germany * Level 6 has been omitted	2021–22 Regionalliga	(Bayern) SpVgg Bayreuth	Bayern Munich II	1st	—
Germany * Level 6 has been omitted	2021–22 Oberliga Baden-Württemberg	SGV Freiberg	Stuttgarter Kickers		
Germany * Level 6 has been omitted	2021–22 Bayernliga	(North) DJK Vilzing	SpVgg Ansbach	1st	—
Germany * Level 6 has been omitted	2021–22 Bayernliga	(South) SpVgg Hankofen-Hailing	SV Donaustauf	1st	—
Germany * Level 6 has been omitted	2021–22 Bremenliga	Bremer SV	Brinkumer SV	15th	2018–19
Germany * Level 6 has been omitted	2021–22 Oberliga Hamburg	TuS Dassendorf	Niendorfer TSV	8th	2019–20
Germany * Level 6 has been omitted	2021–22 Hessenliga	SG Barockstadt Fulda-Lehnerz	TSV Eintracht Stadtallendorf		
Germany * Level 6 has been omitted	2021–22 Mittelrheinliga	1. FC Düren	SV Bergisch Gladbach 09		
Germany * Level 6 has been omitted	2021–22 Oberliga Niederrhein	1. FC Bocholt	VfB 03 Hilden		
Germany * Level 6 has been omitted	2021–22 Oberliga Niedersachsen	Blau-Weiß Lohne	Kickers Emden	1st	—
Germany * Level 6 has been omitted	2021–22 Oberliga Nordost	(North) Greifswalder FC	Hertha Zehlendorf		
Germany * Level 6 has been omitted	2021–22 Oberliga Nordost	(South) Rot-Weiß Erfurt	VFC Plauen	1st	—
Germany * Level 6 has been omitted	2021–22 Oberliga Rheinland-Pfalz/Saar	Wormatia Worms	SV Eintracht Trier		
Germany * Level 6 has been omitted	2021–22 Oberliga Schleswig-Holstein	SV Todesfelde	SV Eichede		
Germany * Level 6 has been omitted	2021–22 Oberliga Westfalen	1. FC Kaan-Marienborn	SG Wattenscheid 09		
Greece * Level 4 has been omitted	2021–22 Super League Greece 2	Levadiakos	Veria	1st	—
Greece * Level 4 has been omitted	2021–22 Gamma Ethniki	(Group 1) Agrotikos Asteras	Pandramaikos	3rd	2013–14 (Group 1)
Greece * Level 4 has been omitted	2021–22 Gamma Ethniki	(Group 2) Makedonikos	Kozani	3rd	1980–81 (Group 4)
Greece * Level 4 has been omitted	2021–22 Gamma Ethniki	(Group 3) Iraklis Larissa	Ypato	1st	—
Greece * Level 4 has been omitted	2021–22 Gamma Ethniki	(Group 4) Panachaiki	Tilikratis	3rd	2016–17 (Group 3)
Greece * Level 4 has been omitted	2021–22 Gamma Ethniki	(Group 5) Ilioupoli	Fostiras	2nd	2008–09 (South)
Greece * Level 4 has been omitted	2021–22 Gamma Ethniki	(Group 6) Proodeftiki	Ethnikos Piraeus	2nd	1989–90 (South)
Greece * Level 4 has been omitted	2021–22 Gamma Ethniki	(Group 7) Rouf	Panionios	2nd	1970–71 (Group 4)
Hungary * Levels 4–8 have been omitted	2021–22 Nemzeti Bajnokság II	Vasas	Kecskemét	2nd	2014–15
Hungary * Levels 4–8 have been omitted	2021–22 Nemzeti Bajnokság III	(West) Mosonmagyaróvár	BVSC Budapest		
Hungary * Levels 4–8 have been omitted	2021–22 Nemzeti Bajnokság III	(Centre) Kozármisleny	Balassagyarmat		
Hungary * Levels 4–8 have been omitted	2021–22 Nemzeti Bajnokság III	(East) Kazincbarcika	Debreceni EAC		
Iceland	2022 1. deild karla	Fylkir	HK		
Iceland	2022 2. deild karla	Njarðvík	Þróttur R.		
Iceland	2022 3. deild karla	Sindri	Dalvík/Reynir		
Iceland	2022 4. deild karla	Einherji	Árbær		
(Republic of Ireland) Ireland	2022 League of Ireland First Division	Cork City	Waterford		
Israel	2021–22 Liga Leumit	Maccabi Bnei Reineh	Sektzia Nes Tziona	1st	—
Israel	2021–22 Liga Alef	(South)			
Israel	2021–22 Liga Alef	(North)			
Israel	2021–22 Liga Bet	(North A Division)			
Israel	2021–22 Liga Bet	(North B Division)			
Israel	2021–22 Liga Bet	(South A Division)			
Israel	2021–22 Liga Bet	(South B Division)			
Israel	2021–22 Liga Gimel	(Upper Galilee)			
Israel	2021–22 Liga Gimel	(Lower Galilee)			
Israel	2021–22 Liga Gimel	(Jezreel)			
Israel	2021–22 Liga Gimel	(Samaria)			
Israel	2021–22 Liga Gimel	(Sharon)			
Israel	2021–22 Liga Gimel	(Tel Aviv)			
Israel	2021–22 Liga Gimel	(Central)			
Israel	2021–22 Liga Gimel	(South)			
Italy * Levels 5–8 have been omitted	2021–22 Serie B	Lecce	Cremonese	2nd	2009–10
Italy * Levels 5–8 have been omitted	2021–22 Serie C	(Group A) Südtirol	Padova	1st	—
Italy * Levels 5–8 have been omitted	2021–22 Serie C	(Group B) Modena	Reggiana	3rd	1974–75 (Group B)
Italy * Levels 5–8 have been omitted	2021–22 Serie C	(Group C) Bari	Catanzaro	4th	1976–77 (Group C)
Italy * Levels 5–8 have been omitted	2021–22 Serie D	Recanatese	Giugliano		
Kazakhstan	2022 Kazakhstan First Division	Okzhetpes	Kaisar		
Kosovo	2021–22 First Football League of Kosovo	Trepça'89	Ferizaj		
Kosovo	2021–22 Second Football League of Kosovo	Vjosa	Rilindja		
Kosovo	2021–22 Third Football League of Kosovo				
Latvia	2022 Latvian First League				
Latvia	2022 Latvian Second League				
Lithuania	2022 LFF I Lyga				
Lithuania	2022 II Lyga				
Lithuania	2022 III Lyga				
Lithuania	2022 IV Lyga				
Luxembourg	2021–22 Luxembourg Division of Honour	Mondercange	Käerjeng		
Luxembourg	2021–22 Luxembourg 1. Division	Jeunesse Schieren; FC Jeunesse Useldange	CS Grevenmacher; FC CeBra 01		
Luxembourg	2021–22 Luxembourg 2. Division	FC Pratzerthal-Redange; AS Colmarberg	FC Schengen; FC The Belval Belvaux		
Luxembourg	2021–22 Luxembourg 3. Division	AS Rupensia Lusitanos Larochette	FC Tricolore Gasperich		
Malta	2021–22 Maltese Challenge League	Żebbuġ Rangers	Pembroke Athleta	1st	—
Malta	2021–22 Maltese National Amateur League	Żurrieq	Attard	1st	—
Moldova	2021–22 Moldovan "A" Division	Sheriff-2 Tiraspol	Victoria Bardar	7th	2016–17
Moldova	2021–22 Moldovan "B" Division	(North) Fălești	Sîngerei		
Moldova	2021–22 Moldovan "B" Division	(South) Văsieni	Stăuceni		
Montenegro	2021–22 Montenegrin Second League	Jedinstvo	Arsenal Tivat	2nd	2015–16
Montenegro	2021–22 Montenegrin Third League	(North) Ibar	Brskovo		
Montenegro	2021–22 Montenegrin Third League	(South) Otrant	Internacional		
Montenegro	2021–22 Montenegrin Third League	(Center) Nikšić	Budva		
Netherlands * Levels 6–10 have been omitted	2021–22 Eerste Divisie	Emmen	Volendam	1st	—
Netherlands * Levels 6–10 have been omitted	2021–22 Tweede Divisie	Katwijk	HHC Hardenberg	2nd	2017–18
Netherlands * Levels 6–10 have been omitted	2021–22 Derde Divisie	(Saturday) Lisse	Sparta Nijkerk	1st	—
Netherlands * Levels 6–10 have been omitted	2021–22 Derde Divisie	(Sunday) USV Hercules	OFC	1st	—
Netherlands * Levels 6–10 have been omitted	2021–22 Hoofdklasse	(Saturday A) FC Rijnvogels	SC Feyenoord		
Netherlands * Levels 6–10 have been omitted	2021–22 Hoofdklasse	(Saturday B) Urk	RKAV Volendam		
Netherlands * Levels 6–10 have been omitted	2021–22 Hoofdklasse	(Sunday A) TOGB	Hoogeveen		
Netherlands * Levels 6–10 have been omitted	2021–22 Hoofdklasse	(Sunday B) Baronie	OJC Rosmalen		
North Macedonia * Levels 4–5 have been omitted	2021–22 Macedonian Second Football League	(West) Sileks	Voska Sport		
North Macedonia * Levels 4–5 have been omitted	2021–22 Macedonian Second Football League	(East) Pobeda	Belasica		
North Macedonia * Levels 4–5 have been omitted	2021–22 Macedonian Third Football League	(North) Lokomotiva	Aerodrom Skopje		
North Macedonia * Levels 4–5 have been omitted	2021–22 Macedonian Third Football League	(South) Vardar Negotino	Zajazi		
North Macedonia * Levels 4–5 have been omitted	2021–22 Macedonian Third Football League	(East) Ovche Pole	Rudar		
North Macedonia * Levels 4–5 have been omitted	2021–22 Macedonian Third Football League	(West) Arsimi	Prevalec		
North Macedonia * Levels 4–5 have been omitted	2021–22 Macedonian Third Football League	(Southwest) Karaorman	Crno Buki ZL		
Northern Ireland * Levels 4–5 have been omitted	2021–22 NIFL Championship	Newry City	Annagh United	1st	
Northern Ireland * Levels 4–5 have been omitted	2021–22 NIFL Premier Intermediate League	Newington	Bangor	1st	
Norway * Level 5 has been omitted	2022 1. divisjon	Brann	Stabæk		
Norway * Level 5 has been omitted	2022 2. divisjon	Moss	Hødd		
Norway * Level 5 has been omitted	2022 3. divisjon	(Group 1) Lyn	Nordstrand		
Norway * Level 5 has been omitted	2022 3. divisjon	(Group 2) Aalesund 2	Førde		
Norway * Level 5 has been omitted	2022 3. divisjon	(Group 3) Brann 2	Fana		
Norway * Level 5 has been omitted	2022 3. divisjon	(Group 4) Fram Larvik	Follo		
Norway * Level 5 has been omitted	2022 3. divisjon	(Group 5) Junkeren	Byåsen		
Norway * Level 5 has been omitted	2022 3. divisjon	(Group 6) Strømsgodset 2	Gjelleråsen		
Norway * Level 5 has been omitted	2022 4. divisjon	(Group 1) Råde	Kråkerøy		
Norway * Level 5 has been omitted	2022 4. divisjon	(Group 2) KFUM 2	Gamle Oslo		
Norway * Level 5 has been omitted	2022 4. divisjon	(Group 3) Ullern 2	Årvoll		
Norway * Level 5 has been omitted	2022 4. divisjon	(Group 4) Skedsmo	Ull/Kisa 2		
Norway * Level 5 has been omitted	2022 4. divisjon	(Group 5) Ham-Kam 2	Kolbukameratene		
Norway * Level 5 has been omitted	2022 4. divisjon	(Group 6) Åskollen	Åssiden		
Norway * Level 5 has been omitted	2022 4. divisjon	(Group 7) Sandefjord 2	Flint		
Norway * Level 5 has been omitted	2022 4. divisjon	(Group 8) Hei	Stathelle og Omegn		
Norway * Level 5 has been omitted	2022 4. divisjon	(Group 9) Donn	Trauma		
Norway * Level 5 has been omitted	2022 4. divisjon	(Group 10) Eiger	Hinna		
Norway * Level 5 has been omitted	2022 4. divisjon	(Group 11) Madla	Varhaug		
Norway * Level 5 has been omitted	2022 4. divisjon	(Group 12) Loddefjord	Askøy		
Norway * Level 5 has been omitted	2022 4. divisjon	(Group 13) Gneist	Voss		
Norway * Level 5 has been omitted	2022 4. divisjon	(Group 14) Sogndal 2	Årdal		
Norway * Level 5 has been omitted	2022 4. divisjon	(Group 15) Herd	Bergsøy		
Norway * Level 5 has been omitted	2022 4. divisjon	(Group 16) Kristiansund 2	Surnadal		
Norway * Level 5 has been omitted	2022 4. divisjon	(Group 17) Verdal	NTNUI		
Norway * Level 5 has been omitted	2022 4. divisjon	(Group 18) Trønder-Lyn	Ranheim 2		
Norway * Level 5 has been omitted	2022 4. divisjon	(Group 19) Mosjøen	Grand Bodø		
Norway * Level 5 has been omitted	2022 4. divisjon	(Group 20) Skånland	Landsås		
Norway * Level 5 has been omitted	2022 4. divisjon	(Group 21) Hamna	Skarp		
Norway * Level 5 has been omitted	2022 4. divisjon	(Group 22) HIF/Stein	Alta 2		
Poland	2021–22 I liga	Miedź Legnica	Widzew Łódź		
Poland	2021–22 II liga	Stal Rzeszów	Chojniczanka Chojnice		
Poland	2021–22 III liga	(Group 1) Legionovia Legionowo	Polonia Warsaw		
Poland	2021–22 III liga	(Group 2) Olimpia Grudziądz	Kotwica Kołobrzeg		
Poland	2021–22 III liga	(Group 3) Zagłębie Lubin II	Ślęza Wrocław		
Poland	2021–22 III liga	(Group 4) Siarka Tarnobrzeg	ŁKS Łagów		
Poland	2021–22 IV liga	(Group 1)			
Poland	2021–22 IV liga	(Group 2)			
Poland	2021–22 IV liga	(Group 3)			
Poland	2021–22 IV liga	(Group 4)			
Poland	2021–22 IV liga	(Group 5)			
Poland	2021–22 IV liga	(Group 6)			
Poland	2021–22 IV liga	(Group 7)			
Poland	2021–22 IV liga	(Group 8)			
Poland	2021–22 IV liga	(Group 9)			
Poland	2021–22 IV liga	(Group 10)			
Poland	2021–22 IV liga	(Group 11)			
Poland	2021–22 IV liga	(Group 12)			
Poland	2021–22 IV liga	(Group 13)			
Poland	2021–22 IV liga	(Group 14)			
Poland	2021–22 IV liga	(Group 15)			
Poland	2021–22 IV liga	(Group 16)			
Poland	2021–22 IV liga	(Group 17)			
Poland	2021–22 IV liga	(Group 18)			
Poland	2021–22 IV liga	(Group 19)			
Poland	2021–22 IV liga	(Group 20)			
Portugal	2021–22 Liga Portugal 2	Rio Ave	Casa Pia	3rd	2002–03
Portugal	2021–22 Liga 3	Torreense	Oliveirense	1st	—
Portugal	2021–22 Campeonato de Portugal	Paredes	Fontinhas		
Romania	2021–22 Liga II	Petrolul Ploiești	Hermannstadt	9th	2010–11
Romania	2021–22 Liga III	Dante Botoșani; Oțelul Galați; Afumați; Progresul Spartac București; Odorheiu Secuiesc; Slatina; CSM Reșița; Dumbrăvița; Hunedoara; Minaur Baia Mare	Foresta Suceava; Focșani; Popești-Leordeni; Tunari; Pucioasa; Viitorul Dăești; Deva; Ghiroda; Metalurgistul Cugir; CA Oradea		
Romania	2021–22 Liga IV	Viitorul Darabani; Speranța Răucești; Rapid Brodoc; Sighetu Marmației; Silvicultorul Maieru; Victoria Carei; MSE Târgu Mureș; Olimpic Zărnești; Universitatea Alba Iulia; Phoenix Buziaș; ACB Ineu; Retezatul Hațeg; Cozia Călimănești; Dunărea Turris Turnu Măgurele; Rucăr; Amara; Păulești; CS Dinamo București; Voința Limpeziș; Unirea Braniștea; Gloria Băneasa	Flacăra Erbiceni; Juniorul Suceava; Sportul Onești; Rapid Jibou; Viitorul Borș; Victoria Cluj; Gheorgheni; Inter Sibiu; Baraolt; Turceni; Recolta Dănceu; Magica Balta Caransebeș; Oltul Curtișoara; Roberto Ziduri; Dunărea Calafat; Glina; Victoria Adunații-Copăceni; Venus Independența; Victoria Gugești; Victoria Traian; Viitorul Murighiol		
Russia * Level 4 has been omitted	2021–22 Russian Football National League	Torpedo Moscow	Fakel Voronezh	1st	—
Russia * Level 4 has been omitted	2021–22 Russian Football National League 2	(Group 1) Dynamo Makhachkala	SKA Rostov-on-Don		
Russia * Level 4 has been omitted	2021–22 Russian Football National League 2	(Group 2) Shinnik	Tver		
Russia * Level 4 has been omitted	2021–22 Russian Football National League 2	(Group 3) Rodina	Sokol		
Russia * Level 4 has been omitted	2021–22 Russian Football National League 2	(Group 4) Volga	Tyumen		
Scotland * Levels 5–7 have been omitted	2021–22 Scottish Championship	Kilmarnock	Arbroath	3rd	1898–99
Scotland * Levels 5–7 have been omitted	2021–22 Scottish League One	Cove Rangers	Airdrieonians	1st	—
Scotland * Levels 5–7 have been omitted	2021–22 Scottish League Two	Kelty Hearts	Forfar Athletic	1st	—
Serbia * Levels 4–7 have been omitted	2021–22 Serbian First League	Mladost GAT	Javor-Matis		
Serbia * Levels 4–7 have been omitted	2021–22 Serbian League	(Belgrade) Radnički Beograd			
Serbia * Levels 4–7 have been omitted	2021–22 Serbian League	(East) Trayal Kruševac			
Serbia * Levels 4–7 have been omitted	2021–22 Serbian League	(Vojvodina) OFK Vršac			
Serbia * Levels 4–7 have been omitted	2021–22 Serbian League	(West) Sloboda Užice			
Slovakia * Level 6–8 have been omitted	2021–22 2. Liga	Podbrezová	Dukla Banská Bystrica		
Slovakia * Level 6–8 have been omitted	2021–22 3. Liga	(Bratislava) Slovan Ivanka pri Dunaji	Rača		
Slovakia * Level 6–8 have been omitted	2021–22 3. Liga	(Western) Považská Bystrica	Spartak Myjava		
Slovakia * Level 6–8 have been omitted	2021–22 3. Liga	(Central) Dolný Kubín	Rakytovce		
Slovakia * Level 6–8 have been omitted	2021–22 3. Liga	(Eastern) Tatran Prešov	Spišská Nová Ves		
Slovakia * Level 6–8 have been omitted	2021–22 4. Liga	(Bratislava)			
Slovakia * Level 6–8 have been omitted	2021–22 4. Liga	(Western)			
Slovakia * Level 6–8 have been omitted	2021–22 4. Liga	(Central)			
Slovakia * Level 6–8 have been omitted	2021–22 4. Liga	(Eastern)			
Slovakia * Level 6–8 have been omitted	2021–22 5. Liga	(Bratislava)			
Slovakia * Level 6–8 have been omitted	2021–22 5. Liga	(Western)			
Slovakia * Level 6–8 have been omitted	2021–22 5. Liga	(Central)			
Slovakia * Level 6–8 have been omitted	2021–22 5. Liga	(Eastern)			
Slovenia	2021–22 Slovenian Second League	Gorica	Triglav Kranj		
Slovenia	2021–22 Slovenian Third League	(East) Bistrica	Dravinja		
Slovenia	2021–22 Slovenian Third League	(West) Brinje Grosuplje	Šenčur		
Spain * Levels 6–10 have been omitted	2021–22 Segunda División	Almería	Valladolid		
Spain * Levels 6–10 have been omitted	2021–22 Primera División RFEF	(Group I) Racing Santander	Albacete		
Spain * Levels 6–10 have been omitted	2021–22 Primera División RFEF	(Group II) Andorra	Villarreal B		
Spain * Levels 6–10 have been omitted	2021–22 Segunda División RFEF	(Group I) Pontevedra	Unión Adarve		
Spain * Levels 6–10 have been omitted	2021–22 Segunda División RFEF	(Group II) Osasuna B	Sestao River		
Spain * Levels 6–10 have been omitted	2021–22 Segunda División RFEF	(Group III) Numancia	Espanyol B		
Spain * Levels 6–10 have been omitted	2021–22 Segunda División RFEF	(Group IV) Córdoba	Mérida		
Spain * Levels 6–10 have been omitted	2021–22 Segunda División RFEF	(Group V) Intercity	La Nucía		
Spain * Levels 6–10 have been omitted	2021–22 Tercera División RFEF	(Group I) Polvorín	Ourense CF		
Spain * Levels 6–10 have been omitted	2021–22 Tercera División RFEF	(Group II) Oviedo Vetusta	Lealtad		
Spain * Levels 6–10 have been omitted	2021–22 Tercera División RFEF	(Group III) Gimnástica Torrelavega	Escobedo		
Spain * Levels 6–10 have been omitted	2021–22 Tercera División RFEF	(Group IV) Alavés B	Beasain		
Spain * Levels 6–10 have been omitted	2021–22 Tercera División RFEF	(Group V) Manresa	Olot		
Spain * Levels 6–10 have been omitted	2021–22 Tercera División RFEF	(Group VI) Valencia CF Mestalla	Atlético Saguntino	1st	—
Spain * Levels 6–10 have been omitted	2021–22 Tercera División RFEF	(Group VII) Atlético Madrid B	Alcorcón B	1st	—
Spain * Levels 6–10 have been omitted	2021–22 Tercera División RFEF	(Group VIII) CD Guijuelo	Atlético Tordesillas	1st	—
Spain * Levels 6–10 have been omitted	2021–22 Tercera División RFEF	(Group IX) Juventud Torremolinos CF	Marbella	1st	—
Spain * Levels 6–10 have been omitted	2021–22 Tercera División RFEF	(Group X) Recreativo Huelva	Utrera	1st	—
Spain * Levels 6–10 have been omitted	2021–22 Tercera División RFEF	(Group XI) RCD Mallorca B	Manacor	1st	—
Spain * Levels 6–10 have been omitted	2021–22 Tercera División RFEF	(Group XII) Atlético Paso	Tenerife B		
Spain * Levels 6–10 have been omitted	2021–22 Tercera División RFEF	(Group XIII) Yeclano Deportivo	Cartagena B	1st	—
Spain * Levels 6–10 have been omitted	2021–22 Tercera División RFEF	(Group XIV) CD Diocesano	Llerenense	1st	—
Spain * Levels 6–10 have been omitted	2021–22 Tercera División RFEF	(Group XV) Atlético Cirbonero	Txantrea		
Spain * Levels 6–10 have been omitted	2021–22 Tercera División RFEF	(Group XVI) CD Arnedo	Alfaro	1st	—
Spain * Levels 6–10 have been omitted	2021–22 Tercera División RFEF	(Group XVII) Deportivo Aragón	Utebo		
Spain * Levels 6–10 have been omitted	2021–22 Tercera División RFEF	(Group XVIII) Guadalajara	Quintanar del Rey		
Sweden * Levels 5–10 have been omitted	2022 Superettan	IF Brommapojkarna	Halmstads BK		
Sweden * Levels 5–10 have been omitted	2022 Division 1	(Norra) Gefle IF	Sandvikens IF		
Sweden * Levels 5–10 have been omitted	2022 Division 1	(Sodra) GAIS	Falkenbergs FF		
Sweden * Levels 5–10 have been omitted	2022 Division 2	(Norrland) Bodens BK	Friska Viljor FC		
Sweden * Levels 5–10 have been omitted	2022 Division 2	(Norra Svealand) IFK Stocksund	IFK Österåker		
Sweden * Levels 5–10 have been omitted	2022 Division 2	(Södra Svealand) United Nordic IK	Assyriska FF		
Sweden * Levels 5–10 have been omitted	2022 Division 2	(Norra Götaland) Ahlafors IF	Lidköpings FK		
Sweden * Levels 5–10 have been omitted	2022 Division 2	(Östra Götaland) Ariana FC	BK Astrio		
Sweden * Levels 5–10 have been omitted	2022 Division 2	(Västra Götaland) Eskilsminne IF	IFK Berga		
Switzerland * Levels 6–9 have been omitted	2021–22 Swiss Challenge League	Winterthur	Schaffhausen	4th	1981–82
Switzerland * Levels 6–9 have been omitted	2021–22 Swiss Promotion League	AC Bellinzona	Breitenrain		
Switzerland * Levels 6–9 have been omitted	2021–22 Swiss 1. Liga	(Group 1) FC Echallens	FC Bulle		
Switzerland * Levels 6–9 have been omitted	2021–22 Swiss 1. Liga	(Group 2) FC Wohlen	FC Luzern II		
Switzerland * Levels 6–9 have been omitted	2021–22 Swiss 1. Liga	(Group 3) FC Baden	St. Gallen II		
Switzerland * Levels 6–9 have been omitted	2021–22 2. Liga Interregional	(Group 1)			
Switzerland * Levels 6–9 have been omitted	2021–22 2. Liga Interregional	(Group 2)			
Switzerland * Levels 6–9 have been omitted	2021–22 2. Liga Interregional	(Group 3)			
Switzerland * Levels 6–9 have been omitted	2021–22 2. Liga Interregional	(Group 4)			
Switzerland * Levels 6–9 have been omitted	2021–22 2. Liga Interregional	(Group 5)			
Switzerland * Levels 6–9 have been omitted	2021–22 2. Liga Interregional	(Group 6)			
Turkey * Levels 5–8 have been omitted	2021–22 TFF First League	MKE Ankaragücü	Ümraniyespor	3rd	1976–77 (White)
Turkey * Levels 5–8 have been omitted	2021–22 TFF Second League	(White) Pendikspor	Amed	1st	—
Turkey * Levels 5–8 have been omitted	2021–22 TFF Second League	(Red) Sakaryaspor	1461 Trabzon	1st	—
Turkey * Levels 5–8 have been omitted	2021–22 TFF Third League	(Group 1) Batman Petrolspor	Belediye Kütahyaspor	2nd	1996–97 (Group 1)
Turkey * Levels 5–8 have been omitted	2021–22 TFF Third League	(Group 2) Düzcespor	İskenderun	4th	1993–94 (Group 8)
Turkey * Levels 5–8 have been omitted	2021–22 TFF Third League	(Group 3) Esenler Erokspor	Fethiyespor	1st	—
Ukraine * Levels 4–8 have been omitted	2021–22 Ukrainian First League	Season abandoned due to the Russian invasion of Ukraine			
Ukraine * Levels 4–8 have been omitted	2021–22 Ukrainian Second League	Season abandoned due to the Russian invasion of Ukraine			
Wales * Levels 4–10 have been omitted	2021–22 Cymru North	Airbus UK Broughton	Llandudno	1st	—
Wales * Levels 4–10 have been omitted	2021–22 Cymru South	Llantwit Major	Pontypridd Town	1st	—
Wales * Levels 4–10 have been omitted	2021–22 Ardal Leagues	(Ardal NE) Chirk AAA	Caersws	1st	—
Wales * Levels 4–10 have been omitted	2021–22 Ardal Leagues	(Ardal NW) Mold Alexandra	Porthmadog		
Wales * Levels 4–10 have been omitted	2021–22 Ardal Leagues	(Ardal SE) Abergavenny Town	Abertillery Bluebirds		
Wales * Levels 4–10 have been omitted	2021–22 Ardal Leagues	(Ardal SW) Pontardawe Town	Ynyshir Albions		
Wales * Levels 4–10 have been omitted	2021–22 Welsh Alliance League	(Division 1)			
Wales * Levels 4–10 have been omitted	2021–22 Welsh Alliance League	(Division 2)			

=== AFC ===
Nation	Tournament	Champion	Second place	Title	Last honour
Australia	2022 National Premier Leagues South Australia	Adelaide City	Adelaide Comets	19th	2021
Australia	2022 State League 1 South Australia	West Adelaide	Para Hills Knights	3rd	2013
Australia	2022 State League 2 South Australia	Vipers FC	Adelaide Cobras	1st	—
Bahrain	2021–22 Bahraini Second Division				
Bangladesh	2021–22 Bangladesh Premier League				
Bhutan	2022 Bhutan Super League				
Brunei	2021–22 Brunei Premier League				
Cambodia	2022 Cambodian Second League				
China * Levels 5–12 have been omitted	2022 China League One	Kunshan	Qingdao Hainiu		
China * Levels 5–12 have been omitted	2022 China League Two	Jinan Xingzhou	Dandong Tengyue		
China * Levels 5–12 have been omitted	2022 Chinese Football Association Member Association Champions League				
Chinese Taipei	2022 Taiwan Second Division Football League				
Hong Kong	2021–22 Hong Kong First Division League	Tai Po	Sham Shui Po		
Hong Kong	2021–22 Hong Kong Second Division League	Kowloon City	Kwai Tsing		
Hong Kong	2021–22 Hong Kong Third Division League	3 Sing	Wing Go		
India	2021–22 I-League 2nd Division				
Indonesia	2022 Liga 2				
Indonesia	2022 Liga 3				
Iran	2021–22 Azadegan League				
Iran	2021–22 League 2				
Iran	2021–22 League 3				
Iraq	2021–22 Iraqi First Division League				
Japan; *Levels 6–7 have been omitted	2022 J2 League	Albirex Niigata	Yokohama FC	2nd	2003
Japan; *Levels 6–7 have been omitted	2022 J3 League	Iwaki FC	Fujieda MYFC	1st	—
Japan; *Levels 6–7 have been omitted	2022 Japan Football League	Nara Club	FC Osaka	1st	—
Japan; *Levels 6–7 have been omitted	2022 Japanese Regional Leagues	Briobecca Urayasu	Okinawa SV		
Jordan	2021–22 Jordan League Division 1				
Kuwait	2021–22 Kuwaiti Division One	Al-Jahra	Al-Sahel	4th	2019–20
Kyrgyzstan	2022 Kyrgyzstan League Second Level				
Laos	2022 Lao Division 1 League				
Lebanon	2021–22 Lebanese Second Division				
Lebanon	2021–22 Lebanese Third Division				
Lebanon	2021–22 Lebanese Fourth Division	(Beirut)			
Lebanon	2021–22 Lebanese Fourth Division	(North)			
Lebanon	2021–22 Lebanese Fourth Division	(South)			
Lebanon	2021–22 Lebanese Fourth Division	(Mount Lebanon)			
Lebanon	2021–22 Lebanese Fourth Division	(Bekaa)			
Lebanon	2021–22 Lebanese Fifth Division	(Beirut)			
Lebanon	2021–22 Lebanese Fifth Division	(North)			
Lebanon	2021–22 Lebanese Fifth Division	(South)			
Macau	2022 2ª Divisão de Macau				
Malaysia	2022 Malaysia Premier League	Kelantan	Kuching City		
Malaysia	2022 Malaysia M3 League	PIB	Kuala Lumpur Rovers		
Malaysia	2022 Malaysia M4 League				
Maldives	2022 Maldivian Second Division Football Tournament				
Maldives	2022 Maldivian Third Division Football Tournament				
Mongolia	2022 Mongolia 1st League				
Myanmar	2022 MNL-2				
North Korea	2022 DPR Korea Football League 2				
North Korea	2022 DPR Korea Football League 3				
Northern Mariana Islands	2022 M*League Division 2				
Oman	2021–22 Oman First Division League				
Oman	2021–22 Oman Second Division League				
Pakistan	2021–22 Football Federation League				
Pakistan	2021–22 Pakistan National Club Championship				
Pakistan	2021–22 Karachi Football League				
Palestine	2021–22 Gaza Strip First League				
Palestine	2021–22 Gaza Strip Second League				
Palestine	2021–22 Gaza Strip Third League				
Palestine	2021–22 West Bank First League				
Palestine	2021–22 West Bank Second League				
Palestine	2021–22 West Bank Third League				
Qatar	2021–22 Qatari Second Division				
Saudi Arabia	2021–22 Saudi First Division League	Al-Khaleej	Al-Adalah	2nd	2005–06
Saudi Arabia	2021–22 Saudi Second Division	Al-Arabi	Al-Qaisumah	2nd	1985–86
Saudi Arabia	2021–22 Saudi Third Division	Al-Suqoor	Al-Qous	1st	—
Saudi Arabia	2021–22 Saudi Fourth Division	Al-Khaldi	Al-Tasamoh	1st	—
Singapore	2022 Singapore National Football League				
South Korea; *Levels 5–8 have been omitted	2022 K League 2	Gwangju FC	Daejeon Hana Citizen		
South Korea; *Levels 5–8 have been omitted	2022 K3 League				
South Korea; *Levels 5–8 have been omitted	2022 K4 League				
Sri Lanka	2021–22 Kit Premier League Division I				
Sri Lanka	2021–22 Kit Premier League Division II				
Sri Lanka	2021–22 Kit Premier League Division III				
Syria	2021–22 Syrian League 1st Division	(Group A)			
Syria	2021–22 Syrian League 1st Division	(Group B)			
Tajikistan	2022 Tajikistan First League				
Tajikistan	2022 Tajikistan Second League				
Thailand	2021-22 Thai League 2	Lamphun Warriors	Sukhothai	1st	—
Thailand	2021-22 Thai League 3	Uthai Thani	Krabi	1st	—
Thailand	2021-22 Thai League 4				
Timor-Leste	2022 LFA Segunda				
Turkmenistan	2022 Turkmenistan First League				
United Arab Emirates	2021–22 UAE Division 1				
United Arab Emirates	2021–22 UAE Division 2				
Uzbekistan	2022 Uzbekistan Pro League				
Uzbekistan	2022 Uzbekistan Pro-B League				
Vietnam	2022 V.League 2	Cong An Nhan Dan	Khanh Hoa		
Vietnam	2022 Vietnamese National Football Second League				
Vietnam	2022 Vietnamese National Football Third League				
Yemen	2021–22 Yemeni Second Division				

=== CAF ===
Nation	League	Champion	Second place	Title	Last honour
Algeria; *Level 4 has been omitted	2021–22 Algerian Ligue Professionnelle 2				
Algeria; *Level 4 has been omitted	2021–22 Ligue Nationale du Football Amateur	(East)			
Algeria; *Level 4 has been omitted	2021–22 Ligue Nationale du Football Amateur	(Centre)			
Algeria; *Level 4 has been omitted	2021–22 Ligue Nationale du Football Amateur	(West)			
Angola; *Level 3-4 has been omitted	2022 Segundona				
Botswana; *Level 3-4 has been omitted	2021–22 Botswana First Division	(Botswana First Division North)			
Botswana; *Level 3-4 has been omitted	2021–22 Botswana First Division	(Botswana First Division South)			
Cameroon	2021–22 Elite Two				
(Democratic Republic of the Congo) DR Congo	2021–22 Linafoot Ligue 2				
Egypt	2021–22 Egyptian Second Division	(Group A) Aswan	Al Aluminium		
Egypt	2021–22 Egyptian Second Division	(Group B) El Dakhleya	Petrojet		
Egypt	2021–22 Egyptian Second Division	(Group C) Haras El Hodoud	Dikernis		
Ethiopia	2021–22 Ethiopian Higher League	(Group A)			
Ethiopia	2021–22 Ethiopian Higher League	(Group B)			
Ethiopia	2021–22 Ethiopian Higher League	(Group C)			
(The Gambia) Gambia	2021–22 GFA League Second Division				
Ghana	2022 Ghana Football Leagues	(Division One League)			
Ghana	2022 Ghana Football Leagues	(Division Two League)			
Ghana	2022 Ghana Football Leagues	(Division Third League)			
Ivory Coast	2021–22 Ligue 2 (Ivory Coast)				
Ivory Coast	2021–22 Championnat Division 3	(Poule A)			
Ivory Coast	2021–22 Championnat Division 3	(Poule B)			
Ivory Coast	2021–22 Championnat Division 3	(Poule C)			
Ivory Coast	2021–22 Championnat Division 3	(Poule D)			
Kenya; *Level 4-7 has been omitted	2022 Kenyan National Super League				
Kenya; *Level 4-7 has been omitted	2022 FKF Division One	(Zone A)			
Kenya; *Level 4-7 has been omitted	2022 FKF Division One	(Zone B)			
Liberia	2021–22 Liberian Second Division League				
Libya	2021–22 Libyan Second Division				
Libya	2021–22 Libyan Third Division				
Morocco	2021–22 Botola 2	Moghreb Tétouan	Union de Touarga	6th	2004–05
Morocco	2021–22 Moroccan Amateur National Division	Widad Témara	Ittifaq Marrakech	2nd	2013–14
Morocco	2021–22 Moroccan Amateur Division I	(North Group) Amal Tiznit	(South Group) Hassania Lazari Oujda	1st	—
Morocco	2021–22 Moroccan Amateur Division II	(North East Group) Ajax Tanger	Union Aguelmous		
Morocco	2021–22 Moroccan Amateur Division II	(North West Group) Renaissance El Gara	FAR U23		
Morocco	2021–22 Moroccan Amateur Division II	(South Group) US Bejaâd	Fath Inezgane		
Morocco	2021–22 Moroccan Amateur Division II	(Sahara Group) Nahdat Tan-Tan	Najm Tarfaya		
Morocco	2021–22 Moroccan Amateur Division III	(North League) Chbab Alam Tanger	Union Imzouren		
Morocco	2021–22 Moroccan Amateur Division III	(East League) Hilal de Nador	Association de Jerada		
Morocco	2021–22 Moroccan Amateur Division III	(Béni Mellal-Khénifra League) HSM Khouribga	Chabab Bradia		
Morocco	2021–22 Moroccan Amateur Division III	(Casablanca League) Wafaa Sidi Moumen	AUS Bouskora		
Morocco	2021–22 Moroccan Amateur Division III	(Meknès-Tafilalet League)			
Morocco	2021–22 Moroccan Amateur Division III	(Souss League) Union Taroudant	Difaa Amsernate		
Morocco	2021–22 Moroccan Amateur Division III	(Chaouia-Doukkala League) Ittihad Ben Ahmed	Sporting Berrechid		
Morocco	2021–22 Moroccan Amateur Division III	(Marrakesh-Safi League) Najm Marrakech	Achbal Hay Elmohamadi		
Nigeria; *Level 3 has been omitted	2021–22 Nigeria National League				
Rwanda	2022 Rwandan Second Division				
Sierra Leone	2022 Sierra Leone National First Division				
Somalia	2021–22 Somali Second Division				
Somalia	2021–22 Somali Third Division				
South Africa; *Level 4 has been omitted	2021–22 National First Division	Richards Bay	TUKS		
South Africa; *Level 4 has been omitted	2021–22 SAFA Second Division				
South Sudan	2022 South Sudan Premier League				
Tanzania	2021–22 Tanzanian First Division League	(Group A)			
Tanzania	2021–22 Tanzanian First Division League	(Group B)			
Tanzania	2021–22 Tanzanian First Division League	(Group C)			
Tanzania	2021–22 Tanzanian Second Division League	(Group A)			
Tanzania	2021–22 Tanzanian Second Division League	(Group B)			
Tanzania	2021–22 Tanzanian Second Division League	(Group C)			
Tanzania	2021–22 Tanzanian Second Division League	(Group D)			
Tunisia; *Level 4-5 has been omitted	2021–22 Tunisian Ligue Professionnelle 2	Stade Tunisien	EO Sidi Bouzid	1st	—
Tunisia; *Level 4-5 has been omitted	2021–22 Tunisian Ligue Professionnelle 3	(Group 1)			
Tunisia; *Level 4-5 has been omitted	2021–22 Tunisian Ligue Professionnelle 3	(Group 2)			
Tunisia; *Level 4-5 has been omitted	2021–22 Tunisian Ligue Professionnelle 3	(Group 3)			
Tunisia; *Level 4-5 has been omitted	2021–22 Tunisian Ligue Professionnelle 3	(Group 4)			
Uganda	2021–22 FUFA Big League				
Zambia	2021–22 Zambian Division One	(Zone One)			
Zambia	2021–22 Zambian Division One	(Zone Two)			
Zambia	2021–22 Zambian Division One	(Zone Three)			
Zambia	2021–22 Zambian Division One	(Zone Four)			
Zimbabwe	2022 Zimbabwe Division 1				

=== CONCACAF ===
Nation	League	Champion	Final score	Second place	Title	Last honour
Aruba	2021–22 Aruban Division Uno	SV Atletico Santa Fe	4–2	SV Unistars	1st	—
Canada	2022 League1 Ontario					
Canada	2022 League1 British Columbia					
Canada	2022 Première Ligue de soccer du Québec					
Canada	2022 Alberta Major Soccer League					
Canada	2022 Canadian Soccer League	FC Continentals	2–1	Scarborough SC	3rd	2020
Costa Rica	2021–22 Liga de Ascenso (Apertura)	Puntarenas	2–0	Barrio México	1st	—
Costa Rica	2021–22 Liga de Ascenso (Clausura)					
Costa Rica	2021–22 Tercera Division de Costa Rica					
El Salvador	2021–22 Segunda División de Fútbol Salvadoreño (Apertura)	Municipal	4–2	Cacahuatique	1st	—
El Salvador	2021–22 Segunda División de Fútbol Salvadoreño (Clausura)					
El Salvador	2021–22 Tercera División de Fútbol Salvadoreño					
Guatemala	Torneo Apertura 2021 Primera División (Guatemala) (Apertura)	Deportivo Marquense	1–1 (4–3 p)	Deportivo Mixco	1st	—
Guatemala	Torneo Clausura 2022 Primera División (Guatemala) (Clausura)					
Guatemala	Torneo Apertura 2021 Segunda División (Guatemala) (Apertura)	San Juan FC	7–3	Deportivo San Jorge Zacapa	1st	—
Guatemala	Torneo Clausura 2022 Segunda División (Guatemala) (Clausura)					
Guatemala	2021–22 Tercera División de Ascenso	Rayados GT	3–1	AFF CENMA Santiago	1st	—
Guyana	2021–22 GFF National Super League					
Honduras	2021–22 Honduran Liga Nacional de Ascenso: Apertura					
Honduras	2021–22 Honduran Liga Nacional de Ascenso: Clausura					
Honduras	2021–22 Honduran Liga Mayor	(Zona Norte)				
Honduras	2021–22 Honduran Liga Mayor	(Zona Sur)				
Jamaica; *Level 3-4 has been omitted	2021–22 KSAFA Super League					
Mexico	2021 Liga de Expansión MX Apertura	Atlante	3–0	Tampico Madero	1st	—
Mexico	2022 Liga de Expansión MX Clausura	Atlético Morelia	2–0	Sonora	1st	—
Mexico	2021 Serie A de México Apertura	Alacranes de Durango	1–0	Inter Playa del Carmen	3rd	1999 Verano
Mexico	2022 Serie A de México Clausura	Mazorqueros	0–0 (4–2 p)	Cafetaleros de Chiapas	1st	
Mexico	2021 Serie B de México Apertura	Aguacateros CDU	2–1	Calor	1st	—
Mexico	2022 Serie B de México Clausura	Aguacateros CDU	4–2	Alebrijes de Oaxaca	2nd	2021 Apertura
Mexico	2021–22 Liga TDP					
Nicaragua	2021–22 Segunda División de Nicaragua: Apertura					
Nicaragua	2021–22 Segunda División de Nicaragua: Clausura					
Nicaragua	2021–22 Tercera División de Nicaragua: Apertura					
Nicaragua	2021–22 Tercera División de Nicaragua: Clausura					
Panama; *Level 3 has been omitted	2021–22 Liga Nacional de Ascenso: Apertura					
Panama; *Level 3 has been omitted	2021–22 Liga Nacional de Ascenso: Clausura					
United States	2022 USL Championship	San Antonio FC	3–1	Louisville City FC	1st	—
United States	2022 USL League One	Tormenta FC	2–1	Chattanooga Red Wolves SC	1st	—
United States	2022 MLS Next Pro (Note: Inaugural season in 2022.)	Columbus Crew 2	4–1	St. Louis City SC 2	1st	—
United States	2022 National Independent Soccer Association	Michigan Stars FC	1–0	Albion San Diego	1st	–
United States	2022 USL League Two	Ventura County Fusion	2–1	Long Island Rough Riders	2nd	2009 (Note: When league was USL PDL)
United States	2021–22 National Premier Soccer League	FC Motown	4–3	Crossfire Redmond	1st	–
United States	2022 UPSL: Spring	Orange County FC	3–1	Beaman United	1st	–
United States	2022 UPSL: Fall	Olympians FC	1–0	SCU Heat	1st	-
(United States Virgin Islands) Virgin Islands	2021–22 St. Croix Soccer League					
(United States Virgin Islands) Virgin Islands	2021–22 St. Thomas League					

=== CONMEBOL ===
Nation	Tournament	Champion	Second place	Title	Last honour
Argentina	Primera Nacional	Belgrano	Instituto	1st	—
Argentina	Primera B Metropolitana				
Argentina	Torneo Federal A	Racing (C)	Villa Mitre	1st	—
Argentina	2022 Primera C Metropolitana				
Argentina	Primera D Metropolitana				
Bolivia	Copa Simón Bolívar				
Brazil	Campeonato Brasileiro Série B	Cruzeiro	Grêmio	1st	—
Brazil	Campeonato Brasileiro Série C	Mirassol	ABC	1st	—
Brazil	Campeonato Brasileiro Série D	América-RN	Pouso Alegre	1st	—
Brazil	(Acre (state)) Campeonato Acreano	Humaitá	São Francisco	1st	—
Brazil	(Alagoas) Campeonato Alagoano	CRB	ASA	32nd	2020
Brazil	(Amapá) Campeonato Amapaense	Trem	Independente	7th	2021
Brazil	(Amazonas (Brazilian state)) Campeonato Amazonense	Manaus FC	Princesa do Solimões	5th	2021
Brazil	(Bahia) Campeonato Baiano	Atlético de Alagoinhas	Jacuipense	2nd	2021
Brazil	(Ceará) Campeonato Cearense	Fortaleza	Caucaia	45th	2021
Brazil	(Federal District (Brazil)) Campeonato Brasiliense	Brasiliense FC	Ceilândia	11th	2021
Brazil	(Espírito Santo) Campeonato Capixaba	Real Noroeste	Vitória-ES	2nd	2021
Brazil	(Goiás) Campeonato Goiano	Atlético Goianense	Goiás EC	16th	2020
Brazil	(Maranhão) Campeonato Maranhense	Sampaio Corrêa	Cordino	36th	2021
Brazil	(Mato Grosso) Campeonato Mato-Grossense	Cuiabá EC	União EC	11th	2021
Brazil	(Mato Grosso do Sul) Campeonato Sul-Mato-Grossense	Operário FC	Naviraiense	12th	2018
Brazil	(Minas Gerais) Campeonato Mineiro	Atlético Mineiro	Cruzeiro	47th	2021
Brazil	(Pará) Campeonato Paraense	Remo	Paysandu	47th	2019
Brazil	(Paraíba) Campeonato Paraibano	Campinense	Botafogo	22nd	2021
Brazil	(Paraná (state)) Campeonato Paranaense	Coritiba	Maringá	39th	2017
Brazil	(Pernambuco) Campeonato Pernambucano	Náutico	Retrô	24th	2021
Brazil	(Piauí) Campeonato Piauiense	Fluminense-PI	Parnahyba	1st	—
Brazil	(Rio Grande do Norte) Campeonato Potiguar	ABC	América-RN	57th	2020
Brazil	(Rio Grande do Sul) Campeonato Gaúcho	Grêmio FBPA	Ypiranga FC	41st	2021
Brazil	(Rio de Janeiro (state)) Campeonato Carioca	Fluminense	Flamengo	32nd	2012
Brazil	(Rondônia) Campeonato Rondoniense	Real Ariquemes	União Cacoalense	3rd	2018
Brazil	(Roraima) Campeonato Roraimense	São Raimundo-RR	Real	13th	2021
Brazil	(Santa Catarina (state)) Campeonato Catarinense	Brusque FC	Camboriú FC	2nd	1992
Brazil	(Sergipe) Campeonato Sergipano	Sergipe	Falcon	36th	2021
Brazil	(São Paulo (state)) Campeonato Paulista	Palmeiras	São Paulo	24th	2020
Brazil	(São Paulo (state)) Campeonato Paulista Série A2	Portuguesa	São Bento	3rd	2013
Brazil	(São Paulo (state)) Campeonato Paulista Série A3	Noroeste	Comercial	2nd	1995
Brazil	(São Paulo (state)) Campeonato Paulista Segunda Divisão	Grêmio Prudente	Itapirense	2nd	2007
Brazil	(Tocantins) Campeonato Tocantinense	Tocantinópolis	Interporto	6th	2021
Chile	Primera B de Chile	Magallanes	Cobreloa	1st	—
Chile	Segunda División Profesional de Chile				
Chile	Tercera A				
Chile	Tercera B				
Colombia	Categoría Primera B	Boyacá Chicó	Atlético Huila	3rd	2017
Ecuador	Ecuadorian Serie B	El Nacional	Independiente Juniors	2nd	1979 E2
Ecuador	Segunda Categoría	Cuniburo	Vargas Torres	1st	—
Paraguay	Paraguayan División Intermedia	Sportivo Trinidense	Sportivo Luqueño	2nd	2009
Peru	Peruvian Segunda División	Cusco	Unión Comercio	1st	—
Uruguay	Uruguayan Segunda División	Racing	La Luz	6th	2007–08
Venezuela	Venezuelan Segunda División	Angostura	Academia Anzoátegui	1st	—

=== OFC ===
Nation	Tournament	Champion	Second place	Title	Last honour
New Zealand	2022 Northern League	Auckland City	Birkenhead United	2nd	2021
New Zealand	2022 Central League	Wellington Olympic	Miramar Rangers	4th	2021
New Zealand	2022 Southern League	Christchurch United	Cashmere Technical	1st	—
New Zealand	2022 Central Federation League	Whanganui Athletic	Palmerston North Marist	2nd	2014
New Zealand	2022 Capital Premier	Stop Out	Island Bay United	10th	2014
New Zealand	2022 Mainland Premier League	FC Twenty 11	Burwood	1st	—
New Zealand	2022 FootballSouth Premier League	Dunedin City Royals	Roslyn-Wakari	2nd	2021
New Zealand	2022 NRFL Division 1	West Coast Rangers	Manurewa	1st	—
New Zealand	2022 NRFL Division 2	Hibiscus Coast	Ngaruawahia United	2nd	2012
(French Polynesia) Tahiti	2021–22 Tahiti Ligue 2				

== Women's second, third and fourth leagues ==
=== UEFA ===
Nation	League	Champion	Second place	Title	Last honour
Austria	2021–22 2. Frauenliga				
Belarus	2022 2. Division				
Belgium	2021–22 Belgian Women's First Division				
Belgium	2021–22 Belgian Women's Second Division				
Belgium	2021–22 Belgian Women's Third Division				
Czech Republic	2021–22 Czech Second Division				
Denmark	2021–22 Danish Women's 1st Division				
England; *Levels 4-9 have been omitted	2021–22 FA Women's Championship				
England; *Levels 4-9 have been omitted	2021–22 FA Women's National League	(North)			
England; *Levels 4-9 have been omitted	2021–22 FA Women's National League	(South)			
England; *Levels 4-9 have been omitted	2021–22 FA Women's National League Division One	(Midlands)			
England; *Levels 4-9 have been omitted	2021–22 FA Women's National League Division One	(North)			
England; *Levels 4-9 have been omitted	2021–22 FA Women's National League Division One	(South East)			
England; *Levels 4-9 have been omitted	2021–22 FA Women's National League Division One	(South West)			
Estonia	2022 Esiliiga				
Finland; *Levels 3-5 have been omitted	2022 Naisten Ykkönen				
France	2021–22 Division 2 Féminine	(Group A)			
France	2021–22 Division 2 Féminine	(Group B)			
Germany; Levels 3-10 have been omitted	2021–22 2. Frauen-Bundesliga				
Hungary	2021–22 Női NB II				
Iceland	2022 1. deild kvenna				
Iceland	2022 2. deild kvenna				
Italy	2021–22 Serie B				
Italy	2021–22 Serie C				
Netherlands; *Levels 3-5 have been omitted	2021–22 Topklasse (women)				
Netherlands; *Levels 3-5 have been omitted	2021–22 Hoofdklasse (women)				
Norway	2022 1. divisjon				
Poland	2021–22 I Liga				
Portugal	2021–22 Campeonato Nacional II Divisão Feminino				
Romania	2021–22 Liga II				
Romania	2021–22 Liga III				
Scotland	2021–22 SWPL 2	Dundee United	Glasgow Women	1st	–
Scotland	2021–22 Scottish Women's Football Championship	Montrose (North)	East Fife	1st	–
Scotland	2021–22 Scottish Women's Football Championship	Gartcairn (South)	Rossvale	1st	–
Serbia	2021–22 Serbian First Women's League				
Spain	2021–22 Segunda División Pro	Levante Las Planas	Espanyol	2nd	2011–12
Spain	2021–22 Primera Nacional de Fútbol	(Group I)			
Spain	2021–22 Primera Nacional de Fútbol	(Group II)			
Spain	2021–22 Primera Nacional de Fútbol	(Group III)			
Spain	2021–22 Primera Nacional de Fútbol	(Group IV)			
Spain	2021–22 Primera Nacional de Fútbol	(Group V)			
Spain	2021–22 Primera Nacional de Fútbol	(Group VI)			
Spain	2021–22 Primera Nacional de Fútbol	(Group VII)			
Sweden; *Levels 3-8 have been omitted	2022 Elitettan				
Turkey	2021–22 Turkish Women's Second Football League				
Turkey	2021–22 Turkish Women's Third Football League				

=== AFC ===
Nation	League	Champion	Second place	Title	Last honour
Australia	2022 National Premier Leagues				
China	2022 Women's League One				
China	2022 Women's League Two				
Chinese Taipei	2022 Taiwan Women's Amateur Football League				
Japan	2022 Nadeshiko League Division 1				
Japan	2022 Nadeshiko League Division 2				

=== CAF ===
Nation	League	Champion	Second place	Title	Last honour
Algeria	2021–22 Algerian Women's D2 National Championship				
Kenya	2022 FKF Women's Division One				
Morocco	2021–22 Moroccan Women's Championship Division Two	(North Group) FUS Rabat	Hilal Temara		
Morocco	2021–22 Moroccan Women's Championship Division Two	(South Group) Association Amjad Taroudant	AGNST Temsia		

=== CONCACAF ===
Nation	League	Champion	Second place	Title	Last honour
Mexico	2022 Liga Mexicana de Fútbol Femenil Clausura				
Mexico	2022 Liga Mexicana de Fútbol Femenil Apertura				
United States	2022 Women's Premier Soccer League	California Storm	Colorado Rapids Women	4th	2004
United States	2022 United Women's Soccer League	Chicago Mustangs	Calgary Foothills	1st	–
United States	2022 USL W League (Note: Inaugural season in 2022.)	South Georgia Tormenta FC	Minnesota Aurora FC	1st	—

=== CONMEBOL ===
Nation	League	Champion	Second place	Title	Last honour
Argentina	2021–22 Campeonato de Fútbol Femenino de Primera División A				
Argentina	2021–22 Campeonato de Fútbol Femenino de Primera División B				
Argentina	2021–22 Campeonato de Fútbol Femenino de Primera División C				
Brazil	2022 Campeonato Brasileiro de Futebol Feminino Série A2	Ceará	Athletico Paranaense	1st	—
Brazil	2022 Campeonato Brasileiro de Futebol Feminino Série A3	AD Taubaté	3B	1st	—
Uruguay	2022 Women's Uruguayan Championship B				
Uruguay	2022 Women's Uruguayan Championship C				

=== OFC ===
Nation	League	Champion	Second place	Title	Last honour
New Zealand	2022 NRFL Women's Premier League	Northern Rovers	Western Springs	1st	—

== Men's university leagues ==
=== CONCACAF ===
Nation	League	Champion	Second place	Title	Last honour
Canada	2022 U Sports Men's Soccer Championship	Thompson Rivers WolfPack	UBC Thunderbirds	1st	—
United States	2022 NCAA Division I Men's Soccer Tournament	Syracuse Orange	Indiana Hoosiers	1st	—
United States	2022 NCAA Division II Men's Soccer Tournament	Franklin Pierce Ravens	CSU Pueblo ThunderWolves	2nd	2007
United States	2022 NCAA Division III Men's Soccer Tournament	Chicago Maroons	Williams Ephs	1st	—
United States	2022 NAIA Men's Soccer Championship	Bethel Pilots	Mobile Rams	1st	—

== Women's university leagues ==
=== CONCACAF ===
Nation	League	Champion	Second place	Title	Last honour
Canada	2022 U Sports Women's Soccer Championship	Montreal Carabins	Laval Rouge et Or	2nd	2017
United States	2022 NCAA Division I Women's Soccer Tournament	UCLA Bruins	North Carolina Tar Heels	2nd	2013
United States	2022 NCAA Division II Women's Soccer Tournament	Western Washington Vikings	West Chester Golden Rams	2nd	2016
United States	2022 NCAA Division III Women's Soccer Tournament	Johns Hopkins Blue Jays	Case Western Reserve Spartans	1st	—
United States	2022 NAIA Women's Soccer Championship	Spring Arbor Cougars	Marian Knights	3rd	2017

== Youth leagues ==
=== UEFA ===
Nation	League	Champion	Second place	Title	Last honour
Austria	2021–22 Jugendliga U18				
Austria	2021–22 Jugendliga U16				
Austria	2021–22 Jugendliga U15				
Belgium	2021–22 Pro League U21				
Bulgaria	2021–22 Elite U19				
Croatia	2021–22 1. HNL Juniori U19				
Croatia	2021–22 1. HNL Juniori U17				
Croatia	2021–22 1. HNL Juniori U15				
Czech Republic	2021–22 1. Liga U19	SK Slavia Prague U19	AC Sparta Prague U19	4th	2019–20
Denmark	2021–22 U19 Ligaen	Copenhagen U19	Midtjylland U19	2nd	2004
Denmark	2021–22 U17 Ligaen				
England	2021–22 Professional U18 Development League	(Division 1) Manchester City U18s (Division 2) Sheffield United U18s	(Division 1) Southampton U18s (Division 2) Charlton Athletic U18s	(Division 1) 4th (Division 2) 1st	(Division 1) 2020–21 (Division 2) —
England	2021–22 Professional U23 Development League	(Division 1) Manchester City U23s (Division 2) Fulham U23s	(Division 1) West Ham United U23s (Division 2) Wolverhampton Wanderers U23s	(Division 1) 2nd (Division 2) 1st	(Division 1) 2020–21 (Division 2) —
Estonia	2022 U19 Eliitliiga				
Finland	2022 A-Junior League U20				
France	2021–22 Championnat National U19				
Germany	2021–22 Under 19 Bundesliga				
Germany	2021–22 Under 19 Bayernliga				
Germany	2021–22 Under 17 Bundesliga				
Germany	2021–22 Under 17 Bayernliga				
Greece	2021–22 Superleague U20				
Greece	2021–22 Superleague U17				
Greece	2021–22 Superleague U15				
Hungary	2021–22 U19 League				
Iceland	2022 U19 League				
(Republic of Ireland) Ireland	2022 League of Ireland U19 Division				
Israel	2021–22 Israeli Noar Premier League				
Italy	2021–22 Campionato Primavera 1				
Italy	2021–22 Campionato Primavera 2				
France	2021–22 Championnat National U19				
Lithuania	2022 Lithuania Championship U19				
Norway	2022 Nasjonal U-19 Super League				
Poland	2021–22 Central Youth League U18				
Portugal	2021–22 Juniores U19				
Romania	2021–22 Liga Elitelor U19				
Romania	2021–22 Liga Elitelor U17				
Russia	2021–22 Russian Youth Football League U21				
Serbia	2021–22 U19 League				
Slovakia	2021–22 U19 League				
Slovenia	2021–22 1. Mladinska Liga				
Slovenia	2021–22 2. Mladinska Liga				
Spain	2021–22 División de Honor Juvenil de Fútbol				
Sweden	2022 U19 League				
Switzerland	2021–22 U18 League				
Turkey	2021–22 U21 Super Lig				
Ukraine	2021–22 Ukrainian Premier League Under-19				
Ukraine	2021–22 Ukrainian Premier League Under-21				

=== AFC ===
Nation	League	Champion	Second place	Title	Last honour
Australia	2021–22 A-League Youth				
China; *U13.U14.U15 has been omitted	2022 National Youth Super League U19				
China; *U13.U14.U15 has been omitted	2022 National Youth Super League U17				
Chinese Taipei; *U15 has been omitted	2022 Taiwan Youth Football League U18				
Hong Kong	2021–22 Hong Kong Junior Football League				
Iran	2021–22 Iran U23 League				
India	2022 India U18 league				
Japan	2022 JFA U-18 football League				
Saudi Arabia	2021–22 U19 Youth League	Al-Hilal	Ohod	12th	2020–21
Saudi Arabia	2021–22 U17 Youth League	Al-Ahli	Al-Fateh	8th	2018–19
Saudi Arabia	2021–22 U15 Youth League	Al-Ittihad	Al-Nassr	1st	–
Saudi Arabia	2021–22 U13 Youth League	Al-Qadsiah	Al-Shabab	1st	–

=== CAF ===
Nation	League	Champion	Second place	Title	Last honour
Algeria	2021–22 Algerian U21 League 1	CS Constantine U21	CR Belouizdad U21		
Algeria	2021–22 Algerian U19 League 1				
Algeria	2021–22 Algerian U17 League 1				
Algeria	2021–22 Algerian U15 League 1				
Morocco	2021–22 Moroccan Espoirs's League (U21)	(North Group) SCC Mohammédia U21	MAS Fes U21		
Morocco	2021–22 Moroccan Espoirs's League (U21)	(South Group) Wydad AC U21	Difaa El Jadidi U21		
Morocco	2022–23 Moroccan National Championship for Youth (U19)	(North Group) FUS Rabat U19	COD Meknes U19		
Morocco	2022–23 Moroccan National Championship for Youth (U19)	(Central Group) AS FAR U19	Raja CA U19		
Morocco	2022–23 Moroccan National Championship for Youth (U19)	(South Group) OC Safi U19	Difaa El Jadidi U19		

=== CONCACAF ===
Nation	League	Champion	Second place	Title	Last honour
Canada	2021–22 Canadian Junior Football League				
Mexico	2021–22 U17 League				
United States	2021–22 US Youth Soccer League				

=== CONMEBOL ===
Nation	League	Champion	Second place	Title	Last honour
Argentina	2021–22 Liga Argentina de Futbol Infantil Juvenil				
Brazil	2022 Campeonato Brasileiro Sub-20				

=== OFC ===
Nation	League	Champion	Second place	Title	Last honour
New Zealand	2022 National Youth League	Auckland United	Tauranga City	1st	—

== Deaths ==
=== January ===
- 3 January –
  - Oussou Konan Anicet, 32, Ivorian footballer (Makkasa, HJK, Nam Dinh), poisoned.
  - Ulysses Kokkinos, 73, Turkish-born Australian footballer (South Melbourne Hellas, Melbourne Juventus).
- 4 January –
  - Javier Astúa, 53, Costa Rican footballer (Puntarenas, Palestino, national team), heart disease.
  - Andreas Michalopoulos, 73, Greek footballer (Panachaiki, national team).
- 5 January –
  - Valeriy Gorbach, 53, Tajik footballer (Fakel Voronezh, Lokomotiv Liski, national team), heart failure.
  - Marian Machowski, 89, Polish footballer (Wisła Kraków, national team).
  - Shahid Uddin Ahmed Selim, 68, Bangladeshi footballer (Brothers Union, national team), oral cancer.
  - Mircea Stoenescu, 78, Romanian footballer (Dinamo București) and referee.
- 7 January – Jimmy Smith, 91, English footballer (Chelsea, Leyton Orient).
- 8 January – Keith Todd, 80, Welsh footballer (Swansea Town, Pembroke Borough).
- 9 January –
  - Viktor Chakrygin, 37, Russian footballer (Dynamo Makhachkala, Zenit Penza, Anzhi Makhachkala).
  - Abdelkrim Kerroum, 85, Algerian footballer (FC Sète 34, Troyes, national team).
- 10 January –
  - Alfred Gager, 79, Austrian footballer (Austria Wien, Wacker Wien, national team).
  - Glyn Jones, 85, English footballer (Sheffield United, Rotherham United, Mansfield Town). (death announced on this date)
- 11 January – Ahmet Yılmaz Çalık, 27, Turkish footballer (Galatasaray, Konyaspor, national team), traffic collision.
- 12 January –
  - Stjepan Lamza, 81, Croatian footballer (Dinamo Zagreb, Châteauroux, Yugoslavia national team).
  - Shebby Singh, 61, Malaysian footballer (Johor, Kuala Lumpur, national team), heart attack.
  - Joseph Zangerle, 72, Luxembourgish footballer (Union Luxembourg, national team).
- 13 January – Giacomo Vianello, 74, Italian footballer (Como).
- 14 January – Lol Morgan, 90, English footballer (Rotherham United, Darlington) and manager (Norwich City).
- 15 January –
  - Paul Hinshelwood, 65, English footballer (Crystal Palace).
  - Robert Péri, 80, French footballer (Bordeaux, FC Metz, Toulon).
- 16 January – Jamie Vincent, 46, English footballer (Bournemouth, Portsmouth, Swindon Town), heart attack.
- 17 January – Jackie Fisher, 96, English footballer (Millwall, Bournemouth).
- 18 January – Paco Gento, 88, Spanish footballer (Real Madrid).
- 19 January – Hans-Jürgen Dörner, 70, East German football player (Dynamo Dresden) and manager (Werder Bremen)
- 20 January – Eduardo Flores, 77, Argentine footballer (Estudiantes), cancer.
- 21 January –
  - Marcel Mauron, 92, Swiss footballer (FC La Chaux-de-Fonds, national team).
  - Howard Radford, 91, Welsh footballer (Bristol Rovers).
- 22 January – António Lima Pereira, 69, Portuguese footballer (Porto, Maia, national team).
- 24 January – Borislav Stevanović, 46, Serbian footballer (Radnički Niš, Rad, BASK).
- 25 January –
  - Dojčin Perazić, 76, Montenegrin footballer (Red Star Belgrade, Vojvodina, FC Den Haag).
  - Wim Jansen, 75, Dutch football player (Feyenoord) and manager (Feyenoord, Celtic)
- 27 January – Salih Šehović, 85, Bosnian footballer (Leotar, Sarajevo, Dinamo Zagreb).

=== February ===
- 1 February –
  - Sergei Anashkin, 60, Kazakh footballer (national team).
- 2 February –
  - Djilali Abdi, 78, Algerian footballer (national team).
  - Ivano Comba, 61, Italian footballer (Sant'Angelo, Piacenza, Rondinella).
- 3 February – Alex Ingram, 77, Scottish footballer (Queen's Park, Ayr United, Nottingham Forest), complications from dementia.
- 4 February –
  - Davie Cattanach, 75, Scottish footballer (Falkirk, Celtic, Stirling Albion).
  - Steve Finney, 48, English footballer (Swindon Town, Carlisle United, Chester City).
  - Rolando Gonçalves, 77, Portuguese footballer (Porto, national team).

=== March ===
- 3 March – Otto Schweizer, 97, German footballer (Bayern Munich)
- 6 March – Frank O'Farrell, 94, Irish football player (West Ham United, Preston North End) and manager (Manchester United)
- 8 March – Tomás Boy, 70, Mexican football player (Tigres UANL) and manager (Morelia, Atlas, Cruz Azul)
- 31 March – Bob Todd, 72, English footballer (Wigan Athletic, Scarborough)

=== April ===
- 13 April – Freddy Rincón, 55, Colombian footballer (América de Cali, Napoli, Real Madrid, Corinthians)
- 16 April – Joachim Streich, 71, East German football player (Hansa Rostock, 1. FC Magdeburg) and manager (1. FC Magdeburg)

=== May ===
- 1 May - Ivica Osim, 80, Bosnian football player (Željezničar) and manager (Željezničar, Yugoslavia national team, Partizan, Panathinaikos, Sturm Graz, Japan national team)
- 5 May
  - José Luis Violeta, 81, Spanish footballer (Zaragoza)
  - Leo Wilden, 85, German footballer (1. FC Köln)

=== June ===
- 1 June – Geoff Hunter, 62, English footballer (Crewe Alexandra, Port Vale, Wrexham)
- 5 June – Haidar Abdul-Razzaq, 39, Iraqi footballer (Al-Talaba)
- 9 June – Billy Bingham, 90, Northern Irish football player (Sunderland) and manager (national team, Plymouth Argyle)
- 19 June – Colin Grainger, 89, English footballer (Sheffield United, Sunderland)

=== July ===
- 2 July – Andy Goram, 58, Scottish footballer (Oldham Athletic, Hibernian, Rangers)
- 4 July – Janusz Kupcewicz, 66, Polish footballer (Arka Gdynia, Lech Poznań)
- 7 July – Phil Walker, 67, English footballer (Millwall, Boavista)
- 11 July – Víctor Benítez, 86, Peruvian footballer (Boca Juniors, AC Milan, Roma, Inter Milan)
- 15 July – Georgi Yartsev, 74, Russian football player (Spartak Moscow) and coach (Spartak Moscow, national team)
- 21 July – Uwe Seeler, 85, German footballer (Hamburger SV)

=== August ===
- 1 August –
  - Milan Đuričić, 60, Serbian football manager (Vojvodina, Inđija, Radnički Niš).
  - John Hughes, 79, Scottish football player (Celtic, national team) and manager (Stranraer).
  - Andrejs Rubins, 43, Latvian footballer (Skonto, Crystal Palace, national team).
  - Hans Weilbächer, 88, German footballer (Eintracht Frankfurt, West Germany national team).
- 15 August – Lenny Johnrose, 52, English footballer (Blackburn Rovers, Bury, Burnley, Swansea City)
- 28 August – Sammy Chung, 90, English football player (Watford) and manager Wolverhampton Wanderers)

=== September ===
- 7 September - Piet Schrijvers, 75, Dutch football player (FC Twente, Ajax) and manager (AZ Alkmaar)
- 13 September - Fred Callaghan, 77, English footballer (Fulham)
- 16 September - Luciano Vassallo, 87, Ethiopian football player (Cotton Factory Club) and manager (national team)

=== October ===
- 6 October - Gian Piero Ventrone, 62, Italian athletic trainer (Juventus, national team, Guangzhou, Tottenham Hotspur)
- 8 October - John Duncan, 73, Scottish football player (Dundee, Tottenham Hotspur) and manager (Chesterfield, Ipswich Town)
- 9 October - Yuriy Dehteryov, 74, Ukrainian footballer (Shakhtar Donetsk)
- 10 October - Keith Eddy, 77, English footballer (Watford, Sheffield United, New York Cosmos)
- 13 October - Stavros Sarafis, 72, Greek footballer (PAOK)
- 19 October - Omar Borrás, 93, Uruguayan football manager (national team)
- 20 October - Jimmy Millar, 87, Scottish footballer (Rangers)
- 21 October - Masato Kudo, 32, Japanese footballer (Kashiwa Reysol, Sanfrecce Hiroshima)

=== November ===
- 2 November - Ronnie Radford, 79, English footballer (Hereford United)
- 12 November - Cor van der Gijp, 91, Dutch footballer (Feyenoord)
- 15 November - Jimmy O'Rourke, 76, Scottish footballer (Hibernian)
- 23 November - David Johnson, 71, English footballer (Everton, Ipswich Town, Liverpool)
- 24 November - Neil Robinson, 65, English footballer (Swansea City, Grimsby Town)
- 26 November - Fernando Gomes, 66, Portuguese footballer (Porto, Sporting Gijón, Sporting CP)
- 27 November - Maurice Norman, 88, English footballer (Norwich City, Tottenham Hotspur)

=== December ===
- 2 December - Assem Allam, 83, Egyptian football owner (Hull City)
- 8 December - Miodrag Ješić, 64, Serbian football player (Partizan, Altay) and manager (Partizan, CSKA Sofia, Al-Ittihad Tripoli)
- 16 December - Siniša Mihajlović, 53, Serbian football player (Red Star Belgrade, Sampdoria, Lazio, Inter Milan) and manager (Bologna, Fiorentina, Serbia national team, Sampdoria, A.C. Milan, Sporting CP)
- 23 December - George Cohen, 83, English footballer (Fulham, national team)
- 29 December -
  - Pelé, 82, Brazilian footballer (Santos, New York Cosmos, national team)
  - John Jackson, 80, English footballer, (Crystal Palace, Leyton Orient)
