= List of Saint Pierre and Miquelon football champions =

Organized football in Saint Pierre and Miquelon has been reported since at least 1964, when the Coupe du Territoire was held. The tournament was played regularly until the Ligue de Football de Saint Pierre et Miquelon was formed in 1976. The league has been played every season since 1976.

Below is the list of champions each year on the island territory where available.

== Coupe du Territoire ==
- 1964 : AS Ilienne Amateur
- 1965 : AS Ilienne Amateur
- 1966 : AS Ilienne Amateur
- 1967 : AS Ilienne Amateur
- 1968 : AS Ilienne Amateur
- 1969 : AS Ilienne Amateur
- 1970 : AS Ilienne Amateur
- 1971 : AS Ilienne Amateur
- 1972 : AS Saint-Pierraise
- 1973 : AS Ilienne Amateur
- 1974 : AS Ilienne Amateur
- 1975 : AS Ilienne Amateur

== Ligue ==
- 1976 : AS Ilienne Amateur
- 1977 : AS Ilienne Amateur
- 1978 : AS Ilienne Amateur
- 1979 : AS Ilienne Amateur
- 1980 : AS Ilienne Amateur
- 1981 : AS Ilienne Amateur
- 1982 : AS Ilienne Amateur
- 1983 : AS Ilienne Amateur
- 1984 : AS Ilienne Amateur
- 1985 : AS Ilienne Amateur
- 1986 : AS Ilienne Amateur
- 1987 : AS Ilienne Amateur
- 1988 : AS Saint-Pierraise
- 1989 : AS Ilienne Amateur
- 1990 : AS Ilienne Amateur
- 1991 : AS Ilienne Amateur
- 1992 : AS Saint-Pierraise
- 1993 : AS Saint-Pierraise
- 1994 : AS Saint-Pierraise
- 1995 : unknown
- 1996 : AS Ilienne Amateur
- 1997 : unknown
- 1998 : unknown
- 1999 : unknown
- 2000 : unknown
- 2001 : AS Saint-Pierraise
- 2002 : AS Ilienne Amateur
- 2003 : AS Ilienne Amateur
- 2004 : AS Ilienne Amateur
- 2005 : AS Miquelonnaise
- 2006 : unknown
- 2007 : AS Saint-Pierraise
- 2008 : AS Miquelonnaise
- 2009 : unknown
- 2010 : AS Ilienne Amateur
- 2011 : AS Ilienne Amateur
- 2012 : AS Ilienne Amateur
- 2013 : AS Ilienne Amateur
- 2014 : not known
- 2015 : AS Saint-Pierraise
- 2016 : AS Saint-Pierraise
- 2017 : AS Ilienne Amateur
- 2018 : AS Ilienne Amateur
- 2019 : AS Saint-Pierraise
- 2020 : AS Miquelonnaise
- 2021 : AS Miquelonnaise
- 2022 : AS Saint-Pierraise
- 2023 : AS Miquelonnaise
- 2024 : AS Saint-Pierraise
- 2025 : AS Miquelonnaise

== See also ==
- Football in Saint Pierre and Miquelon
- Ligue de Football de Saint Pierre et Miquelon
