= Saint Pierre and Miquelon clubs in the Coupe de France =

Football Clubs in French Overseas Collectivity of Saint Pierre and Miquelon

Association football clubs from the French Overseas Collectivity of Saint Pierre and Miquelon have represented the archipelago in the Coupe de France beginning with the 2018–19 edition of the tournament. The following is a list of year-by-year results of Saint Pierre and Miquelon's representative.

As a note, the reigning champions of the previous Ligue SPM season will always receive a bye to the second round of the Coupe de France.

== Results ==
=== 2018–2019 ===
A.S. Saint Pierraise advanced to the third round of the 2018–19 Coupe de France. The team was eventually eliminated by a narrow 1–2 defeat to ALC Longvic of the Ligue Bourgogne-Franche-Comté de Football (VII). Maël Kello made history as the first Saint Pierre and Miquelon player to score in the tournament.

Semifinals
Miquelonnaise	0
Saint Pierraise	1

Final
Ilienne Amateur	0 (2)
Saint Pierraise (p)	0 (4)

24 June 2018 First Round	A.S. Miquelonnaise (Saint Pierre and Miquelon)	0–1	(Saint Pierre and Miquelon) A.S. Saint Pierraise	Saint Pierre and Miquelon
		Report

4 July 2018 Second Round	A.S. Ilienne Amateur (Saint Pierre and Miquelon)	0–0 (2–4 p)	(Saint Pierre and Miquelon) A.S. Saint Pierraise	Saint Pierre and Miquelon
		Report

15 September 2018 Third Round	ALC Longvic (France)	2–1	(Saint Pierre and Miquelon) A.S. Saint Pierraise	Longvic, France
		Report; Report	Maël Kello	Stadium: Stade Municipal Maurice Colson

=== 2019–2020 ===
For the 2019–20 season, A.S. Ilienne Amateur became the second team from Saint Pierre and Miquelon to compete in Metropolitan France in the Coupe de France after teams from the island entered the tournament for the first time in 2018–19. Prior to its Third Round match against FC Lyon, A.S.I.A toured the Groupama Stadium home of Ligue 1 side Olympique Lyonnais. The match ended in a 1–5 defeat, ending the club's campaign for the year.

Semifinals
Saint Pierraise	1
Miquelonnaise	2

Final
Ilienne Amateur	3
Miquelonnaise	0

19 June 2019 First Round	A.S. Saint Pierraise (Saint Pierre and Miquelon)	1–2	(Saint Pierre and Miquelon) A.S. Miquelonnaise	Saint Pierre and Miquelon
	Hugo Pereia Nevez 76'	Report	Helory Briand 55' (o.g.); Thomas Girardin 65'	Stadium: Stade Léonce Claireaux

3 July 2019 Second Round	A.S. Ilienne Amateur (Saint Pierre and Miquelon)	3–0	(Saint Pierre and Miquelon) A.S. Miquelonnaise	Saint Pierre and Miquelon
		Report		Stadium: Stade John Girardin

14 September 2019 Third Round	FC Lyon (France)	5–1	(Saint Pierre and Miquelon) A.S. Ilienne Amateur	Lyon, France
		Report		Stadium: Stade Georges Vuillermet

=== 2020–2021 ===
As the winner of the preliminary rounds on Saint Pierre and Miquelon, A.S. Saint Pierraise would have gained entry to the third round draw of the Pays de la Loire region. However, on 8 September 2020, the overseas territory banned travel to mainland France due to the ongoing COVID-19 situation. The side had been due to depart on 12 September, travelling via Montreal and Paris. The club was scheduled to take on La Roche VF eight days later.

Semifinals
Ilienne Amateur	1 (2)
Miquelonnaise (p)	1 (3)

Final
Saint Pierraise (p)	0 (4)
Miquelonnaise	0 (2)

18 July 2020 First Round	A.S. Ilienne Amateur (Saint Pierre and Miquelon)	1–1 (2–3 p)	(Saint Pierre and Miquelon) A.S. Miquelonnaise	Saint Pierre and Miquelon
		Report; Report		Stadium: Stade John Girardin

25 July 2020 Second Round	A.S. Saint Pierraise (Saint Pierre and Miquelon)	0–0 (4–2 p)	(Saint Pierre and Miquelon) A.S. Miquelonnaise	Saint Pierre and Miquelon
		Report; Report		Stadium: Stade Léonce Claireaux

20 September 2020 Third Round	La Roche VF (France)	cancelled	(Saint Pierre and Miquelon) A.S. Saint Pierraise	La Roche-sur-Yon, France
		Report		Stadium: Stade Henri Desgrange

=== 2021–2022 ===
In May 2021 it was announced that A.S. Saint Pierraise would not receive an automatic qualification to the third round of the 2021–22 Coupe de France despite losing the opportunity the previous year because of the COVID-19 pandemic. The first and second round local qualification matches were played between 7 July and 24 July 2021 with the winner participating in the Pays de la Loire region third round in September 2021. A.S. Miquelonnaise received a bye to the second round match as the reigning champions of the Ligue SPM from the 2020 season. A.S. Saint Pierraise took on USSA Vertou in France, ultimately losing the match 0–8.

Semifinals
Saint Pierraise	2
Ilienne Amateur	1

Final
Miquelonnaise	1
Saint Pierraise	2

7 July 2021 First Round	A.S. Saint Pierraise (Saint Pierre and Miquelon)	2–1	(Saint Pierre and Miquelon) A.S. Ilienne Amateur	Saint Pierre and Miquelon
	Loey Kello 21'; Tristan Girardin 65'	Report	Maxime Gautier 6'	Stadium: Léonce Claireaux Stadium

24 July 2021 Second Round	A.S. Miquelonnaise (Saint Pierre and Miquelon)	1–2	(Saint Pierre and Miquelon) A.S. Saint Pierraise	Saint Pierre and Miquelon
	Joris Le Gall	Report	Own goal Mehdi Ayadi	Stadium: Miquelon-Langlade, Stade de l'Avenir

18 September 2021 Third Round	USSA Vertou (France)	8–0	(Saint Pierre and Miquelon) A.S. Saint Pierraise	Vertou, France
		Report		Stadium: Stade des Échalonnières

=== 2022–2023 ===
Semifinals
Saint Pierraise	2 (4)
Ilienne Amateur (p)	2 (5)

Final
Ilienne Amateur (p)	0 (3)
Miquelonnaise	0 (1)

6 July 2022 First Round	A.S. Saint Pierraise (Saint Pierre and Miquelon)	2–2 (4–5 p)	(Saint Pierre and Miquelon) A.S. Ilienne Amateur	Saint Pierre and Miquelon
		Report		Stadium: Léonce Claireaux Stadium

23 July 2022 Second Round	A.S. Ilienne Amateur (Saint Pierre and Miquelon)	0–0 (3–1 p)	A.S. Miquelonnaise (Saint Pierre and Miquelon)	Saint Pierre and Miquelon
		Report		Stadium: Stade John Girardin

10 September 2022 Third Round	Luynes Sports (France)	6–0	(Saint Pierre and Miquelon) A.S. Ilienne Amateur	Luynes, France
				Stadium: Stade Laurent Ruzzettu

=== 2023–2024 ===
8 July 2023 First Round	A.S. Ilienne Amateur (Saint Pierre and Miquelon)	0–1	A.S. Miquelonnaise (Saint Pierre and Miquelon)	Saint Pierre and Miquelon
				Stadium: Stade John Girardin

20 July 2023 Second Round	A.S. Saint Pierraise (Saint Pierre and Miquelon)	3–0	A.S. Miquelonnaise (Saint Pierre and Miquelon)	Saint Pierre and Miquelon
				Stadium: Léonce Claireaux Stadium

16 September 2023 Third Round	CO Pacéen (France)	3–0	(Saint Pierre and Miquelon) A.S. Saint Pierraise	Pacé, France
				Stadium: Stade Bernard Haires

=== 2024–2025 ===
6 July 2024 First Round	A.S. Miquelonnaise (Saint Pierre and Miquelon)	0–1	A.S. Saint Pierraise (Saint Pierre and Miquelon)	Saint Pierre and Miquelon
				Stadium: Miquelon-Langlade, Stade de l'Avenir

20 July 2024 Second Round	A.S. Saint Pierraise (Saint Pierre and Miquelon)	1–0	A.S. Ilienne Amateur (Saint Pierre and Miquelon)	Saint Pierre and Miquelon
				Stadium: Léonce Claireaux Stadium

14 September 2024 Third Round	EF Reims Sainte-Anne (France)	3–0	(Saint Pierre and Miquelon) A.S. Saint Pierraise	Reims, France
				Stadium: Stade Robert Pirès

=== 2025–2026 ===
Semifinals
Saint Pierraise	6
Ilienne Amateur	1

Final
Saint Pierraise (p)	0 (5)
Miquelonnaise	0 (4)

5 July 2025 First Round	A.S. Saint Pierraise (Saint Pierre and Miquelon)	6–1	(Saint Pierre and Miquelon) A.S. Ilienne Amateur	Saint Pierre and Miquelon
	Hugo Pereira 18', 85'; Endika Alvarez 20'; Seif Khelafi 74'; Arthur Le Pape 75'; Maël Kello 93'	Report	Amadéo Fizel 59'	Stadium: Léonce Claireaux Stadium

20 July 2025 Second Round	A.S. Saint Pierraise (Saint Pierre and Miquelon)	0–0 (5–4 p)	(Saint Pierre and Miquelon) A.S. Miquelonnaise	Saint Pierre and Miquelon
		Report		Stadium: Léonce Claireaux Stadium
	Penalties
	Arthur Lepape (penalty scored); Endika Alvarez (penalty scored); Seif Khelafi (penalty scored); Abou Kodio (penalty scored); Maël Kello (penalty scored)		Evan Moren (penalty scored); Enzo Coste (penalty scored); Thibault Detcheverry (penalty scored); Nathan Coste (penalty scored); Eric Coste (penalty missed)

13 September 2025 Third Round	FC Arsac Pian Médoc (France)	2–1	(Saint Pierre and Miquelon) A.S. Saint Pierraise	Arsac, Grenoble, France
	? 5'; ? 77'	Report	Arthur Lepape 11'	Stadium: Stade de la Bergerie
