= Saint Pierre and Miquelon football league system =

The Saint Pierre and Miquelon football league system, or league pyramid, refers to the hierarchically interconnected league system for association football in Saint Pierre and Miquelon.

== Structure ==
The Ligue de Football de Saint Pierre et Miquelon is the top-level, and only senior men's competition, featuring just the three clubs, A.S. Ilienne Amateur, A.S. Saint Pierraise, and A.S. Miquelonnaise. Each team plays a total of 16 games during the Summer season with four home and four away matches against both other teams. The season itself is divided into four smaller segments. At the end of the season, the leader in the overall league table is declare the winner of the championship.

There are also organized youth leagues for various age divisions. The youth teams compete both in Saint Pierre and Miquelon and in the lower leagues of Newfoundland, Canada. The archipelago is an associate member of the Newfoundland and Labrador Soccer Association.

Since 2019 senior women's football has also been revived in the archipelago after being dormant for a number of years.

== Cup eligibility ==
The premier senior men's cup in the territory is the Coupe de l'Archipel. The tournament consists of one match with the first place team of the Ligue SPM facing the second place team in mid September each year. Since 2018–19, a team from Saint Pierre and Miquelon has entered the Coupe de France after a short series of qualifying matches to determine the representative.
