= List of football stadiums in Saint Pierre and Miquelon =

The following is a list of football stadiums in Saint Pierre and Miquelon, ordered by capacity. There are four outdoor football pitches and one futsal hall. There are currently plans to construct a new national stadium with artificial turf as part of Saint Pierre and Miquelon's application to join CONCACAF.

== List ==
| # | Image | Stadium | Capacity | City | Home team | Opened |
|---|---|---|---|---|---|---|
| 1 | | Stade John Girardin | 1,400 | Saint-Pierre | A.S. Ilienne Amateur | 1958 |
| 2 | | Stade Léonce Claireaux | 500 | Saint-Pierre | A.S. Saint Pierraise | |
| 3 | | Stade de l'Avenir | 200 | Miquelon-Langlade | A.S. Miquelonnaise | 1977 |
| 4 | | Stade Léon Mahé | 150 | Saint-Pierre | A.S. Ilienne Amateur (youth) | |
| 5 | | Centre Culturel et Sportif | | Saint-Pierre | Rugby SPM XV | |

== See also ==
- List of North American stadiums by capacity
- List of association football stadiums by capacity
