= Football in Saint Pierre and Miquelon =

The sport of association football in the territory of Saint Pierre and Miquelon is run by the Football Federation of Saint-Pierre and Miquelon. The association administers the representative sides (such as the men's national football team), as well as the Ligue de Football de Saint Pierre et Miquelon. Although teams from the archipelago had already been participating in tournaments of the Newfoundland and Labrador Soccer Association, the organization amended its bylaws in October 2019 to make Saint Pierre and Miquelon an associate member.

Football has existed on the islands since at least 1921, with extremely limited action by local sides against visiting warships. League football has existed since at least 1976, consisting of A.S. Ilienne Amateur, A.S. Saint Pierraise and A.S. Miquelonnaise, which play each other repeatedly throughout the season. The former two are from Saint-Pierre, while AS Miquelonnaise is from Miquelon. Similarly there has been cup football since 1976, though the number of such competitions has varied, with the Coupe de l'Archipel primarily being a match between first and second of the previous league season while others are formatted more like a group stage. From the 2018-19 season, the league sent a team into the Coupe de France, with two knockout rounds played to determine which team the territory would send. They therefore enter the third round of the preliminary qualification, though it varies which region they then play in. No corresponding women's league appears to exist, though photos suggest that girls train alongside their male counterparts at youth level. A women's youth representative side has competed locally, with victory in the 2016 Newfoundland and Labrador U15 Girls Cup. However, further evidence of women's football is limited.

The national team competed twice in the Coupe de l'Outre-Mer, in 2010 and 2012, but otherwise has not been in any international competition, though with support from the French Football Federation they have reportedly applied for CONCACAF membership. As of July 2022, there has been no further information on this front.
