= 2021 Ligue de Football de Saint Pierre et Miquelon =

Ligue de Football de Saint Pierre et Miquelon
- Season: 2021
- Dates: 26 May to 18 September 2021
- Champions: Miquelonnaise (5)
- Matches: 24
- Best Player: Hugo Gaspard
- Top goalscorer: Nicolas Lemaine (10)
- Best goalkeeper: Yorick Lucas
- All statistics correct as of 13:16, 8 June 2021 (UTC).

The 2021 Ligue de Football de Saint Pierre et Miquelon season was the 36th edition of top-division Ligue de Football de Saint Pierre et Miquelon football in Saint Pierre and Miquelon. Three clubs competed in the league: AS Saint Pierraise, A.S. Miquelonnaise and A.S. Ilienne Amateur. The 4-month season kicked off on 26 May with a match between ASSP and Asia. ASSP won 3–0. In the second match of the season ASM defeated ASSP 3–1. The final match of the season was on 18 September 2021. Miquelonnaise clinched the championship after a 5–0 victory over Saint Pierraise in Match 20.

== Clubs ==
Location of teams in the Ligue de SPM 2021

Team	Home city	Manager	Home ground
Ilienne Amateur	Saint-Pierre	(France) Kevin Coma	Stade John Girardin
Miquelonnaise	Miquelon-Langlade	(France) Bruno Ferry	Stade de l'Avenir
Saint Pierraise	Saint-Pierre	(France) Sébastien Cuvier	Stade Léonce Claireaux

== Overall table ==
Pos	Team	Pld	W	D	L	GF	GA	GD	Pts
1	Miquelonnaise (C)	16	10	1	5	32	12	+20	47
2	Saint Pierraise	16	7	2	7	22	32	−10	39
3	Ilienne Amateur	16	5	1	10	16	26	−10	32

Updated to match(es) played on 8 September 2021.
Source: https://www.rsssf.org/tabless/stpierre2021.html
(C) Champions

== Matches ==
=== Coupe Agricole Eco ===
Pos	Team	Pld	W	D	L	GF	GA	GD	Pts	MIQ	ASP	ILA
1	Miquelonnaise (C)	4	3	0	1	7	3	+4	13		3–1	2–0
2	Saint Pierraise	4	3	0	1	7	4	+3	13	1–0		3–0
3	Ilienne Amateur	4	0	0	4	2	9	−7	4	1–2	1–2	

Updated to match(es) played on 19 June 2021.
Source: https://www.rsssf.org/tabless/stpierre2021.html
(C) Champions

26 May Match 1	A.S. Saint Pierraise	3–0	A.S. Ilienne Amateur	Saint-Pierre, Saint Pierre and Miquelon
7:00PM	Seïf Khelaffi; Endika Alvarez; Hugo Pereira (pen.)	Report; Report		Stadium: Stade Léonce Claireaux

29 May Match 2	A.S. Miquelonnaise	3–1	A.S. Saint Pierraise	Miquelon-Langlade, Saint Pierre and Miquelon
2:45PM	Méric Poirier; Michaël Boissel,	Report	Endika Alvarez	Stadium: Stade de l'Avenir

5 June Match 3	A.S. Ilienne Amateur	1–2	A.S. Miquelonnaise	Saint-Pierre, Saint Pierre and Miquelon
2:30PM		Report	Nicolas Lemaine 11' (pen.)	Stadium: Stade Léonce Claireaux

9 June Match 4	A.S. Îlienne Amateur	1–2	A.S. Saint Pierraise	Saint-Pierre, Saint Pierre and Miquelon
7:00PM	Lloyd Girardin	Report	Arthur Lepape (pen.); Hugo Pereira	Stadium: Stade John Girardin

12 June Match 5	A.S. Saint Pierraise	1–0	A.S. Miquelonnaise	Saint-Pierre, Saint Pierre and Miquelon
2:30PM	Seïf Khelaffi 86'	Report		Stadium: Stade Léonce Claireaux

19 June Match 6	A.S. Miquelonnaise	2–0	A.S. Îlienne Amateur	Miquelon-Langlade, Saint Pierre and Miquelon
2:45PM	Nicolas Lemaine 15' (pen.); Fabien Gaspard	Report		Stadium: Stade de l'Avenir

A.S. Miquelonnaise won the Coupe Agricole Eco.

=== Coupe CCAS EDF ===
Pos	Team	Pld	W	D	L	GF	GA	GD	Pts	MIQ	ILA	ASP
1	Miquelonnaise (C)	4	2	1	1	4	5	−1	11		2–1	1–0
2	Ilienne Amateur	4	2	0	2	7	5	+2	10	4–1		2–1
3	Saint Pierraise	4	1	1	2	2	3	−1	8	0–0	1–0	

Updated to match(es) played on 17 July 2021.
Source: https://www.rsssf.org/tabless/stpierre2021.html
(C) Champions

23 June Match 7	A.S. Saint Pierraise	1–0	A.S. Ilienne Amateur	Saint-Pierre, Saint Pierre and Miquelon
7:00PM	Lucas Brillant 64' (o.g.)	Report		Stadium: Stade Léonce Claireaux

30 June Match 8	A.S. Saint Pierraise	0–0	A.S. Miquelonnaise	Saint-Pierre, Saint Pierre and Miquelon
7:00PM		Report		Stadium: Stade Léonce Claireaux

3 July Match 9	A.S. Ilienne Amateur	4–1	A.S. Miquelonnaise	Saint-Pierre, Saint Pierre and Miquelon
1:00PM	David Artano (pen.); Sean Sbeghen Lamiraud; Martin Disnard; Julien Audouze	Report	Nathan Coste 90'	Stadium: Stade John Girardin

10 July Match 10	A.S. Miquelonnaise	1–0	A.S. Saint Pierraise	Miquelon-Langlade, Saint Pierre and Miquelon
2:45PM		Report		Stadium: Stade de l'Avenir

14 July Match 11	A.S. Îlienne Amateur	2–1	A.S. Saint Pierraise	Saint-Pierre, Saint Pierre and Miquelon
5:00PM	David Artano 7',	Report		Stadium: Stade John Girardin

17 July Match 12	A.S. Miquelonnaise	2–1	A.S. Îlienne Amateur	Miquelon-Langlade, Saint Pierre and Miquelon
2:45PM	Thibault Detcheverry 24'; Nicolas Lemaine	Report	Corentin Hégésippe 39' (pen.)	Stadium: Stade de l'Avenir

A.S. Miquelonnaise won the Coupe CCAS EDF.

=== Coupe Taxi Tan ===
Pos	Team	Pld	W	D	L	GF	GA	GD	Pts	MIQ	ILA	ASP
1	Miquelonnaise (C)	4	3	0	1	14	3	+11	13		3–0 (Note: Awarded 3–0)	5–0
2	Ilienne Amateur	4	1	1	2	5	9	−4	8	3–1		2–2
3	Saint Pierraise	4	1	1	2	5	12	−7	8	0–5	3–0	

Updated to match(es) played on 1 September 021.
Source: https://www.rsssf.org/tabless/stpierre2021.html
(C) Champions
Notes:

28 July Match 13	A.S. Saint Pierraise	3–0 (Awarded)	A.S. Ilienne Amateur	Saint-Pierre, Saint Pierre and Miquelon
7:00PM		Report		Stadium: Stade Léonce Claireaux

5 August Match 14	A.S. Saint Pierraise	0–5	A.S. Miquelonnaise	Saint-Pierre, Saint Pierre and Miquelon
2:45PM		Report	Nicolas Lemaine,, Hugo Gaspard; Joris Légal	Stadium: Stade Léonce Claireaux

7 August Match 15	A.S. Miquelonnaise	3–0	A.S. Îlienne Amateur	Miquelon-Langlade, Saint Pierre and Miquelon
2:45PM	Nicolas Lemaine 27'; Quentin Girardin; Joris Légal 75'	Report		Stadium: Stade de l'Avenir

12 August Match 16	A.S. Îlienne Amateur	2–2	A.S. Saint Pierraise	Saint-Pierre, Saint Pierre and Miquelon
7:00PM	Corentin Hégésippe; Aldric Mahé 89'	Report	Seif Khelaffi; Mehdi Ayadi	Stadium: Stade John Girardin

14 August Match 17	A.S. Miquelonnaise	5–0	A.S. Saint Pierraise	Miquelon-Langlade, Saint Pierre and Miquelon
2:45PM	Joris Légal 3', Mickaël Boissel 30'; Nicolas Lemaine 45'; Hugo Gaspard	Report		Stadium: Stade de l'Avenir

1 September Match 18	A.S. Îlienne Amateur	3–1	A.S. Miquelonnaise	Saint-Pierre, Saint Pierre and Miquelon
	William Soufou 11'; Sean Lamiraud; Corentin Hegesippe (pen.)	Report		Stadium: Stade John Girardin

=== Coupe Rotary Club ===
Pos	Team	Pld	W	D	L	GF	GA	GD	Pts	MIQ	ILA	ASP
1	Miquelonnaise (C)	4	2	0	2	9	6	+3	10		1–2	5–0
2	Ilienne Amateur	4	2	0	2	7	5	+2	10			1–3
3	Saint Pierraise	4	2	0	2	8	13	−5	10	4–3	1–4	

Updated to match(es) played on 25 August.
Source: https://www.rsssf.org/tabless/stpierre2021.html
(C) Champions

25 August Match 19	A.S. Saint Pierraise	1–4	A.S. Ilienne Amateur	Saint-Pierre, Saint Pierre and Miquelon
6:45PM		Report	Sean Sbeghen Lamiraud,	Stadium: Stade Léonce Claireaux

28 August Match 20	A.S. Miquelonnaise	5–0	A.S. Saint Pierraise	Miquelon-Langlade, Saint Pierre and Miquelon
2:45PM	Hugo Gaspard,, Nicolas Lemaine,	Report		Stadium: Stade de l'Avenir

4 September Match 21	A.S. Ilienne Amateur	v	A.S. Miquelonnaise	Saint-Pierre, Saint Pierre and Miquelon
1:00PM				Stadium: Stade John Girardin

6 September Match 22	A.S. Saint Pierraise	4–3	A.S. Miquelonnaise	Saint-Pierre, Saint Pierre and Miquelon
1:00PM	Seif Khellafi 74', 90+4' (pen.); Hugo Pereira,	Report	???; Michael Boissel 68'; Hugo Gaspard 72'	Stadium: Stade Léonce Claireaux

8 September Match 23	A.S. Îlienne Amateur	1–3	A.S. Saint Pierraise	Saint-Pierre, Saint Pierre and Miquelon
7:00PM	Lucas Brillant 45'	Report	Endika Alvarez 3'; Seif Khelaffi 34'; Tommy Skinner (o.g.)	Stadium: Stade John Girardin

18 September Match 24	A.S. Miquelonnaise	1–2	A.S. Îlienne Amateur	Miquelon-Langlade, Saint Pierre and Miquelon
2:45PM		Report		Stadium: Stade de l'Avenir

Source: Ligue SPM

A.S. Miquelonnaise won the Coupe Rotary Club.

== Goalscorers ==
10 goals

- Nicolas Lemaine

6 goals

- Seïf Khelaffi
- Hugo Gaspard

4 goals

- Joris Légal
- Michaël Boissel
- Hugo Pereira

3 goals

- David Artano
- Sean Sbeghen Lamiraud
- Corentin Hégésippe
- Endika Alvarez

1 goal

- Mehdi Ayadi
- Méric Poirier
- Lloyd Girardin
- Arthur Lepape
- Fabien Gaspard
- Quentin Girardin
- Nathan Coste
- Aldric Mahé
- Martin Disnard
- Julien Audouze
- Thibault Detcheverry
- William Soufou
- Sean Lamiraud
- Lucas Brillant
