= Bruno Ferry =

French football manager (born 1967)

Personal information
- Date of birth: 6 May 1967 (age 59)
- Place of birth: Châtel-sur-Moselle, France
- Position: Goalkeeper

Senior career*
Years	Team	Apps	(Gls)
1983–1996	SAS Épinal		
1989–1990	→SC Abbeville (loan)		
1996–1999	Paris FC		
1999–2000	US Raon-l'Étape		

Managerial career
- 2000–2004: ES Thaon
- 2007–2008: ÉF Bastia (assistant)
- 2008: ÉF Bastia
- 2013–2014: AS Dakar Sacré-Cœur
- 2014–2015: Louhans-Cuiseaux
- 2015–2018: Accra Lions
- 2018–2019: Accra Lions (scout)
- 2019: Accra Lions
- 2020–2021: A.S. Miquelonnaise
- 2021: Eding Sport FC
- 2021: FC Guipry-Messac (interim)
- 2024: Azam F.C.
- 2024–2025: A.S. Vita Club (assistant)
- 2025: A.S. Vita Club
- * Club domestic league appearances and goals

Bruno Ferry is a French football manager who has been the head coach of A.S. Miquelonnaise of the Ligue SPM since 2020. He is a former professional goalkeeper.

== Playing career ==
Ferry is most famous for his time at SAS Épinal in the French Ligue 2 and Paris FC.

== Managerial career ==
Ferry began his coaching career in 2001 with ES Thaon in his native France. He then went on to ES Golbey and ÉF Bastia. In 2010, he made the jump to African football and joined AS Dakar Sacré-Cœur in Senegal as Sporting Director. However, he returned to France in 2014 to join Louhans-Cuiseaux FC. In 2015, he returned to Africa, where he joined Accra Lions FC of Ghana as head coach.

In July 2020, it was reported by African media that Ferry was set to join Ashanti Gold S.C. of the Ghana Premier League as the Technical Director of the club after having already coached in the second tier of Ghana with Accra Lions FC and in Senegal with AS Dakar Sacré-Cœur. However shortly thereafter, it was reported that negotiations between the club and manager had broken down.

For the 2020 season, Ferry joined A.S. Miquelonnaise of the Ligue de Football de Saint Pierre et Miquelon after spending the previous four years in Ghana. ASM won the league championship that season for the first time in twelve years.

In January 2021, it was announced that Ferry had signed a 1-year deal with Eding Sport FC of the Cameroonian Elite One. However, he ultimately returned to A.S. Miquelonnaise for a second season in 2021.
