= List of football clubs in Saint Pierre and Miquelon =

This is a list of football (soccer) clubs in Saint Pierre and Miquelon.

- A.S. Ilienne Amateur
- A.S. Miquelonnaise
- A.S. Saint Pierraise
