= 2016 Ligue de Football de Saint Pierre et Miquelon =

Ligue de Football de Saint Pierre et Miquelon
- Season: 2016
- Champions: Saint Pierraise
- Matches: 24
- Goals: 90 (3.75 per match)
- Biggest home win: Ilienne Amateur 8-0 Miquelonnaise (3 August 2016)
- Biggest away win: Miquelonnaise 2-5 Saint-Pierraise (9 July 2016)
- Highest scoring: Ilienne Amateur 8-0 Miquelonnaise (3 August 2016)
- All statistics correct as of 19 April 2017.

The 2016 Ligue de Football de Saint Pierre et Miquelon was the 31st season of top-division football in Saint Pierre and Miquelon. Three clubs competed in the league: AS Saint Pierraise, A.S. Miquelonnaise and A.S. Ilienne Amateur. The three teams played each other eight times, composing of a 16-match season starting on 28 May 2016 and ending on 10 September 2016.

Saint Pierraise won the league title, amassing the best record after 16 matches.

== Clubs ==
Team	Home city	Home ground
Ilienne Amateur	Saint-Pierre	Stade Léonce Claireaux
Miquelonnaise	Miquelon-Langlade	Stade de l'Avenir
Saint Pierraise	Saint-Pierre	Stade Léonce Claireaux

== Standings ==
Pos	Team	Pld	W	D	L	GF	GA	GD	Pts	Qualification or relegation
1	Saint Pierraise (C)	16	9	3	4	38	22	+16	46	Champions
2	Ilienne Amateur	16	6	5	5	32	21	+11	39	
3	Miquelonnaise	16	3	4	9	20	47	−27	29	

Updated to match(es) played on 22 September 2016.
Source: https://www.rsssf.org/tabless/stpierre2016.html
(C) Champions
