= 2019 Ligue de Football de Saint Pierre et Miquelon =

Ligue de Football de Saint Pierre et Miquelon
- Season: 2019
- Dates: 26 May – 21 September 2019
- Champions: Saint Pierraise
- Matches: 25
- Goals: 80 (3.2 per match)
- Biggest home win: ASIA 4–1 ASM (16 Jun 2019)
- Biggest away win: ASM 0–13 ASSP (14 Sep 2019)
- Highest scoring: ASM 0–13 ASSP (14 Sep 2019)
- Longest unbeaten run: ASSP (11 matches) (29 May–28 Aug)
- All statistics correct as of 23 August 2019.

The 2019 Ligue de Football de Saint Pierre et Miquelon was the 34th season of top-division football in Saint Pierre and Miquelon. Three clubs competed in the league: AS Saint Pierraise, A.S. Miquelonnaise and A.S. Ilienne Amateur. The three teams played each other eight times, composing of a 16-match season starting in May 2019 and ending in September 2019.

Saint Pierraise were the champions.

== Clubs ==
Location of teams in the Ligue de SPM 2019

Team	Home city	Home ground
Ilienne Amateur	Saint-Pierre	Stade Léonce Claireaux
Miquelonnaise	Miquelon-Langlade	Stade de l'Avenir
Saint Pierraise	Saint-Pierre	Stade Léonce Claireaux

== Table ==
Pos	Team	Pld	W	D	L	GF	GA	GD	Pts	Qualification or relegation
1	Saint Pierraise (C)	16	8	5	3	35	19	+16	45	Champions
2	Ilienne Amateur	16	6	4	6	26	19	+7	38	
3	Miquelonnaise	16	4	3	9	19	42	−23	31	

Updated to match(es) played on 24 September 2019.
Source: https://www.rsssf.org/tabless/stpierre2019.html
(C) Champions
