= 2017 Ligue de Football de Saint Pierre et Miquelon =

Ligue de Football de Saint Pierre et Miquelon
- Season: 2017
- All statistics correct as of 30 April 2017.

The 2017 Ligue de Football de Saint Pierre et Miquelon will be the 32nd season of top-division football in Saint Pierre and Miquelon. Three clubs will compete in the league: AS Saint Pierraise, A.S. Miquelonnaise and A.S. Ilienne Amateur. The three teams played each other eight times, composing of a 16-match season starting in May 2017 and ending in September 2017.

Saint Pierraise are the defending champions.

== Clubs ==
Location of teams in the Ligue de SPM 2017

Team	Home city	Home ground
Ilienne Amateur	Saint-Pierre	Stade Léonce Claireaux
Miquelonnaise	Miquelon-Langlade	Stade de l'Avenir
Saint Pierraise	Saint-Pierre	Stade Léonce Claireaux

== Table ==
Pos	Team	Pld	W	D	L	GF	GA	GD	Pts	Qualification or relegation
1	Ilienne Amateur	16	10	4	2	35	18	+17	50	Champions
2	Saint Pierraise	15	6	4	5	23	22	+1	37	
3	Miquelonnaise	15	3	0	12	19	37	−18	24	

Updated to match(es) played on 17 September 2017.
Source: https://www.rsssf.org/tabless/stpierre2017.html
