= 2022 Ligue de Football de Saint Pierre et Miquelon =

Ligue de Football de Saint Pierre et Miquelon
- Season: 2022
- Champions: Saint Pierraise

The 2022 Ligue de Football de Saint Pierre et Miquelon season was the 37th edition of top-division Ligue de football de Saint-Pierre-et-Miquelon football in Saint Pierre and Miquelon. Three clubs competed in the league: AS Saint Pierraise, A.S. Miquelonnaise and A.S. Ilienne Amateur. The 4-month season kicked off on 25 May with a match between ASSP and ASIA. ASIA won with 0–1. In the second match of the season ASM defeated ASSP 2–3. The final match of the season was on 19 September 2022.

== Clubs ==
Location of teams in the Ligue de SPM 2022

Team	Home city	Home ground
Ilienne Amateur	Saint-Pierre	Stade Léonce Claireaux
Miquelonnaise	Miquelon-Langlade	Stade de l'Avenir
Saint Pierraise	Saint-Pierre	Stade Léonce Claireaux

== Standings ==
Pos	Team	Pld	W	D	L	GF	GA	GD	Pts
1	Saint Pierraise (C)	15	9	2	4	22	16	+6	44
2	Miquelonnaise	16	8	2	6	21	23	−2	42
3	Ilienne Amateur	15	4	0	11	14	18	−4	27

Updated to match(es) played on unknown.
Source: https://www.rsssf.org/tabless/stpierre2022.html
(C) Champions
