= List of Saint Pierre and Miquelon international footballers =

The following is a list of footballers who have represented Saint Pierre and Miquelon in senior international matches.

== Key ==
Positions key
GK	Goalkeeper
DF	Defender
MF	Midfielder
FW	Forward

Position
Playing positions are listed according to the player's preferred position, and not based on tactical formations that were employed at the time.
Caps and goals
Caps and goals are composed of Coupe de l'Outre-Mer matches and required qualification matches, as well as numerous international friendly tournaments and matches.

== Players ==
List is incomplete as of 15 March 2020.

Player	Birth Date	Position	Caps	Goals
Yannis Bègue	2 January 1982	MF/FW		0
