= Stade Léon Mahé =

Stade Leon Mahé
- Interactive map of Stade Leon Mahé
- Full name: English: Leon Mahé Stadium
- Location: Saint-Pierre, Saint Pierre and Miquelon
- Coordinates: 46°46′45.22″N 56°10′56.38″W
- Capacity: 150

Stade Leon Mahé is a multi-use stadium in Saint-Pierre, Saint-Pierre and Miquelon, France. It is currently used mostly for football matches.
