= Coupe de l'Archipel =

Football tournament in Saint Pierre and Miquelon

- Organiser(s): (Saint Pierre and Miquelon) Ligue SPM
- Founded: 1976; 50 years ago
- Region: Saint Pierre and Miquelon
- Teams: 3
- Current champions: A.S. Saint Pierraise (7th title)
- Most championships: A.S. Ilienne Amateur (25 titles)

Coupe de l'Archipel (English: Archipelago Cup) is the annual men's domestic association football cup competition of Saint Pierre and Miquelon. A tournament for futsal is also held annually.

== History ==
The tournament was first played in 1976.

== Format ==
The format of the cup was adjusted to its current format in 1983. The tournament consists of one match with the first place team in the Ligue SPM facing the second place team in mid September each year.

== Clubs ==
Club	City
A.S. Ilienne Amateur	Saint-Pierre
A.S. Miquelonnaise	Miquelon
A.S. Saint Pierraise	Saint-Pierre

== Winners ==
- 1976 : AS Ilienne Amateur
- 1977 : AS Ilienne Amateur
- 1978 : AS Ilienne Amateur
- 1979 : AS Ilienne Amateur
- 1980 : AS Ilienne Amateur
- 1981 : AS Ilienne Amateur
- 1982 : AS Ilienne Amateur
- 1983 : AS Ilienne Amateur
- 1984 : not played
- 1985 : AS Ilienne Amateur
- 1986 : AS Ilienne Amateur
- 1987 : AS Ilienne Amateur
- 1988 : AS Ilienne Amateur
- 1989 : not played
- 1990 : AS Saint-Pierraise
- 1991 : AS Ilienne Amateur
- 1992 : AS Ilienne Amateur
- 1993 : AS Miquelonnaise
- 1994 : not played
- 1995 : AS Ilienne Amateur
- 1996 : AS Ilienne Amateur
- 1997 : AS Miquelonnaise
- 1998 : not played
- 1999 : AS Saint-Pierraise
- 2000 : AS Miquelonnaise
- 2001 : AS Saint-Pierraise
- 2002 : AS Ilienne Amateur
- 2003 : AS Ilienne Amateur
- 2004 : AS Miquelonnaise
- 2005 : AS Miquelonnaise
- 2006 : AS Ilienne Amateur
- 2007 : AS Saint-Pierraise
- 2008 : AS Miquelonnaise
- 2009 : AS Miquelonnaise
- 2010 : AS Ilienne Amateur
- 2011 : AS Ilienne Amateur
- 2012 : AS Ilienne Amateur
- 2013 : AS Miquelonnaise
- 2014 : AS Ilienne Amateur
- 2015 : AS Saint-Pierraise
- 2016 : AS Saint-Pierraise
- 2017 : AS Ilienne Amateur
- 2018 : AS Ilienne Amateur
- 2019 : AS Saint-Pierraise
- 2020 : AS Saint-Pierraise
- 2021 : AS Miquelonnaise
- 2022 : AS Saint-Pierraise
- 2023 : AS Miquelonnaise
- 2024 : AS Ilienne Amateur
- 2025 : AS Miquelonnaise
