= 2019–20 Coupe de France preliminary rounds, Auvergne-Rhône-Alpes =

The 2019–20 Coupe de France preliminary rounds, Auvergne-Rhône-Alpes was the qualifying competition to decide which teams from the leagues of the Auvergne-Rhône-Alpes region of France took part in the main competition from the seventh round.

A total of nineteen teams qualified from the Auvergne-Rhône-Alpes preliminary rounds. In 2018–19, two teams reached the round of 16. FC Villefranche lost to Paris Saint-Germain after extra time, and AS Lyon Duchère lost to AS Vitré.

== Schedule ==
The first two rounds took place on the weekends of 25 August 2019 and 1 September 2019. Additionally, there was a cadrage, or intermediate framing round on 8 September 2019 to obtain the number of teams required in the third round. 798 teams took place in the first round, from tier 8 (Regional division 3) and below. One winning team (from first round tie number 311) was given a bye in the second round. There were six ties in the cadrage round.

The third round draw took place on 3 September 2019, with the 193 second round winner joined by the team given a bye, FC Belle Étoile Mercury, the team from Saint Pierre et Miquelon, AS Îlienne Amateurs, the 48 teams from Régional 2 (tier 7), the 22 teams from Régional 1 (tier 6) and the 11 teams from Championnat National 3 (tier 5).

The fourth round draw took place on 17 September 2019. The six teams from Championnat National 2 (tier 4) joined at this stage, with 72 ties being drawn.

The fifth round draw took place on 3 October 2019. The four teams from Championnat National (tier 3) joined at this stage, with 38 ties being drawn.

The sixth round draw took place on 17 October 2019. 19 ties were drawn.

=== First round ===
These matches were played on 24 and 25 August 2019.

First round results: Auvergne-Rhône-Alpes
| Tie no | Home team (tier) | Score | Away team (tier) |
|---|---|---|---|
| 1. | AS Job (10) | 2–0 | US Orcet (9) |
| 2. | FC Mirefleurs (10) | 1–0 | AS Livradois Sud (9) |
| 3. | CO Veyre-Monton (10) | 1–5 | US Les Martres-de-Veyre (8) |
| 4. | US Courpière (10) | 5–1 | FC Vertaizon (8) |
| 5. | ES Couze Pavin (11) | 0–7 | ES St Germinoise (8) |
| 6. | CSA Brassacois Florinois (10) | 2–1 (Note: Tie reversed with agreement of both clubs.) | EC Lembronnais (12) |
| 7. | US Val de Couze Chambon (10) | 0–8 | US Issoire (8) |
| 8. | FC St Julien-de-Coppel (10) | 3–0 | La Combelle CAB (9) |
| 9. | AS Cunlhat (11) | 1–2 | SC Billom (9) |
| 10. | AS Moissat (10) | 2–1 | AI St Babel (9) |
| 11. | FC Paslières-Noalhat (12) | 0–7 | Clermont Ouvoimoja (10) |
| 12. | ES Thuret (12) | 2–1 | US Les Martres-d'Artière (9) |
| 13. | US Palladuc (12) | 3–3 (3–5 p) | FC Chauriat (10) |
| 14. | US Limons (10) | 0–4 | US Maringues (8) |
| 15. | RC St Clément-de-Régnat (10) | 1–5 | US Gerzat (10) |
| 16. | FF Chappes (11) | 0–3 | FC Lezoux (9) |
| 17. | ES St Rémy-sur-Durolle (11) | 3–1 | Durolle Foot (9) |
| 18. | Entente CAS Durollien GF Portugais (12) | 1–4 | FC Nord Limagne (9) |
| 19. | US Tours-sur-Meymont (12) | 0–15 | US Ennezat (9) |
| 20. | AS Haute-Dordogne (10) | 4–4 (4–5 p) | Clermont Métropole FC (9) |
| 21. | RS Luzillat-Charnat-Vinzelles (10) | 1–5 | US St Beauzire (8) |
| 22. | FC Bromont-Lamothe/Montfermy (11) | 1–4 (a.e.t.) | FC Blanzat (10) |
| 23. | US Menat-Neuf-Eglise (11) | 1–3 | US Chapdes-Beaufort (10) |
| 24. | CS St Bonnet-près-Riom (10) | 0–3 | FC Châtel-Guyon (8) |
| 25. | US Combronde (12) | 4–2 | Pérignat FC (10) |
| 26. | AS Enval-Marsat (8) | 5–0 | AS Cellule (10) |
| 27. | RC Charbonnières-Paugnat (11) | 4–2 | AS St Ours (10) |
| 28. | ES Volcans Malauzat (12) | 3–5 | ACS Cappadoce (11) |
| 29. | SC Gannat (10) | 2–1 | JS St Priest-des-Champs (9) |
| 30. | FC Nord Combraille (10) | 2–3 (a.e.t.) | US St Gervaisienne (9) |
| 31. | RC Laqueuille (11) | 3–0 | FC Aydat (12) |
| 32. | AS Orcines (9) | 3–1 | EFC St Amant-Tallende (8) |
| 33. | FC Aubierois (9) | 0–1 | Espérance Ceyratois Football (8) |
| 34. | AS Royat (10) | 0–3 | US Mozac (8) |
| 35. | US Messeix Bourg-Lastic (12) | 3–1 | ALS Besse Egliseneuve (9) |
| 36. | FC Plauzat-Champeix (10) | 2–1 | Dômes-Sancy Foot (8) |
| 37. | AS Romagnat (9) | 1–0 | AS St Genès-Champanelle (8) |
| 38. | Entente Charblot (11) | 1–4 | Ecureuils Franc Rosier (10) |
| 39. | ES St Étienne-de-Vicq/Bost (12) | 0–5 | Vigilante Garnat St Martin (9) |
| 40. | FC Souvigny (10) | 3–2 | SC Avermes (8) |
| 41. | AS Salignoise (11) | 4–2 | US Cœur Allier (11) |
| 42. | AS Billezois (11) | 1–4 | Commentry FC (9) |
| 43. | AS Nord Vignoble (8) | 9–0 | AS Ménulphienne (12) |
| 44. | Étoile Moulins Yzeure (9) | 0–2 | US Lignerolles-Lavault Ste Anne (8) |
| 45. | Magnet-Suillet-St Gérand (11) | 6–1 | US Malicorne (11) |
| 46. | US St Désiré (11) | 0–4 | US Vendat (8) |
| 47. | AS Sanssat (12) | 0–9 | US Biachette Désertines (11) |
| 48. | Ballon Beaulonnais (10) | 3–4 | AS Gennetinoise (10) |
| 49. | US Saulcet-Le Theil (11) | 2–0 | US Abrest (11) |
| 50. | AS Toulonnaise (10) | 1–3 | CS Bessay (9) |
| 51. | ES Montagne Bourbonnaise (12) | 0–3 | AS Louchy (8) |
| 52. | AS Rongères (11) | 0–2 | Bourbon Sportif (9) |
| 53. | US Varennes-sur-Tèche (10) | 3–0 | AS Cérilly (10) |
| 54. | AS St Angel (11) | 3–0 | OC Monetay-sur-Allier (11) |
| 55. | JS Neuvy (10) | 5–1 | CS Cosne d'Allier (9) |
| 56. | Espoir Molinetois (11) | 1–4 | Montluçon FC (11) |
| 57. | CS Vaux-Estivareilles (12) | 5–2 | US Toque Huriel (11) |
| 58. | Jaligny Vaumas Foot (10) | 1–4 | AL Quinssaines (10) |
| 59. | US Chevagnes (11) | 0–2 | AS Val de Sioule (11) |
| 60. | FC Creuzier-le-Neuf (12) | 0–3 | AS Le Breuil (10) |
| 61. | CS Thielois (12) | 1–4 | FR Pouzy-Mésangy (11) |
| 62. | FC Haut d'Allier (10) | 1–2 | ES Vernetoise (9) |
| 63. | ES St Plaisir (12) | 0–15 | AA Lapalisse (8) |
| 64. | US Marcillat-Pionsat (10) | 0–3 | AC Creuzier-le-Vieux (8) |
| 65. | AS Boucetoise (11) | 2–3 (a.e.t.) | Stade St Yorre (9) |
| 66. | Bellerive-Brugheas Football (11) | 0–2 | AS Varennes-sur-Allier (8) |
| 67. | AS Mercy-Chapeau (11) | 0–5 | AS Dompierroise (9) |
| 68. | FC Billy-Crechy (10) | 0–1 | Bézenet-Doyet Foot (8) |
| 69. | US Trezelles (10) | 3–4 | Médiéval Club Montluçonnais (9) |
| 70. | SC Ygrandais (11) | 1–3 | AS Tronget (10) |
| 71. | AS Neuilly-le-Réal (11) | 0–0 (5–4 p) | US Vallon (9) |
| 72. | ASPTT Moulins (11) | 1–2 | US St Victor (11) |
| 73. | US Bains-St Christophe (9) | 6–2 | US Bassoise (10) |
| 74. | St Jeures SJ (13) | 0–10 | AS Villettoise (9) |
| 75. | AS Montfaucon (11) | 1–4 | US Fontannoise (8) |
| 76. | FC Tence (10) | 2–6 (a.e.t.) | Sauveteurs Brivois (8) |
| 77. | FC Vézézoux (10) | 2–4 (a.e.t.) | AS Loudes (8) |
| 78. | AS Pertuis (10) | 0–5 | Retournac Sportif (8) |
| 79. | Aiguilhe FC (12) | 1–5 | FC Dunières (8) |
| 80. | FC Arzon (10) | 1–3 | AS Laussonne (9) |
| 81. | AS Cheminots Langeac (10) | 1–4 | US Monistrol (8) |
| 82. | FC Venteuges (11) | 0–8 | US Vals Le Puy (10) |
| 83. | AG Sigolenoise (10) | 0–1 (a.e.t.) | AS St Didier-St Just (8) |
| 84. | AS Mazet-Chambon (11) | 2–7 | FC Aurec (9) |
| 85. | AS Grazac-Lapte (9) | 4–1 | Montregard JL Raucoules (10) |
| 86. | US Lantriac (11) | 0–3 | US Arsac-en-Velay (9) |
| 87. | US Landos (10) | 1–4 | Olympic St Julien-Chapteuil (8) |
| 88. | AS St Ferréol-Gampille-Firminy (12) | 2–3 | AS Chadrac (8) |
| 89. | FC Minier (11) | 3–5 | Entente Nord Lozère (8) |
| 90. | AS Trizacoise (12) | 3–6 | US Murat (9) |
| 91. | Saignes FC (10) | 05– | ES St Mamet (9) |
| 92. | US Besse (11) | 1–0 | FC des Quatre Vallées (9) |
| 93. | US Loupiac St Christophe (12) | 2–3 | Sud Cantal Foot (8) |
| 94. | AS Espinat (10) | 4–7 | AS Belbexoise (9) |
| 95. | FC Junhac-Montsalvy (10) | 0–6 | AS Sansacoise (8) |
| 96. | FC Hauts de Cère (12) | 1–2 | ES Riomois-Condat (9) |
| 97. | US Cère et Landes (11) | 1–4 (a.e.t.) | FC Artense (9) |
| 98. | Jordanne FC (12) | 1–3 | Cère FC Vic/Polminhac (10) |
| 99. | FC Albepierre-Bredons (11) | 1–14 | CS Vézac (9) |
| 100. | AS Pleaux-Rilhac-Barriac (10) | 1–0 | Parlan-Le Rouget FC (8) |
| 101. | ES Roannaise (12) | 1–6 | AS Ayrens-St Illide (10) |
| 102. | ES Vebret-Ydes (11) | 0–1 | US Crandelles (9) |
| 103. | St Georges SL (12) | 2–1 | AS Yolet (10) |
| 104. | US La Chapelle-Laurent (10) | 1–3 | ES Pierrefortaise (9) |
| 105. | ES Vitrac Marcolès (11) | 1–3 | Carladez-Goul Sportif (9) |
| 106. | Cézallier Alagnon FC (12) | 2–8 | CS Arpajonnais (8) |
| 107. | ES Margeride (11) | 2–3 | FC Massiac-Molompize-Blesle (9) |
| 108. | US Drôme Provence (12) | 2–1 | FC Aubenas (11) (Note: FC Aubenas replace FC Chanas in the original draw.) |
| 109. | AS La Sanne (12) | 1–2 | Olympiqe St Quentinois (10) |
| 110. | AS Homenetmen Bourg-lès Valence (11) | 2–0 | AL St Maurice-l'Exil (9) |
| 111. | AS Rhodanienne (10) | 6–1 | SC Romans (11) |
| 112. | ES Trèfle (13) | 3–2 | FC Hauterives/US Grand-Serre (11) |
| 113. | FC Rochepaule (13) | 0–3 | AS St Félicien (13) |
| 114. | US Peyrins (13) | 3–0 (Note: Tie won by means of forfeit.) | US Pailharès-Lalouvesc (13) |
| 115. | FC St Restitut (13) | 2–6 | ES Nord Drôme (12) |
| 116. | ES St Jeure-d'Ay-Marsan (12) | 3–2 | AS St Marcelloise (12) |
| 117. | FC Larnage-Serves (11) | 6–2 | FC Colombier St Barthélemy (12) |
| 118. | FC Cheylarois (11) | 4–2 | JS Livron (12) |
| 119. | AS Dolon (11) | 4–2 | FC Alboussière (12) |
| 120. | AS St Priest 07 (13) | 2–4 | AS Vallée du Doux (11) |
| 121. | US Baixoise (12) | 0–5 | Olympique Centre Ardèche (10) |
| 122. | AS Désaignes (13) | 3–1 | US 2 Vallons (13) |
| 123. | FC St Didier-sous-Aubenas (12) | 8–0 | Independante Blacheroise (12) |
| 124. | US St Just-St Marcel (11) | 3–3 (4–2 p) | Valence FC (9) |
| 125. | FC Hermitage (11) | 1–1 (5–6 p) | JS St-Paul-lès-Romans (12) |
| 126. | AS Roiffieux (12) | 5–3 (a.e.t.) | ES Beaumonteleger (12) |
| 127. | FC Bren (12) | 2–1 | EA Montvendre (11) |
| 128. | FC Clérieux-St Bardoux-Granges-les-Beaumont (12) | 6–1 | AS St Lattier (11) |
| 129. | SA St Agrève (12) | 1–5 | US Pont-La Roche (10) |
| 130. | CS Malataverne (13) | 2–1 | FC 540 (11) |
| 131. | AS Cancoise (12) | 1–1 (2–1 p) (Note: AS Cancoise penalised for fielding ineligible players. Olympique St Montanais qualify.) | Olympique St Montanais (12) |
| 132. | AS St Barthélemy-Grozon (12) | 13–2 | CS Lapeyrousien (13) |
| 133. | AS Roussas-Granges-Gontardes (11) | 3–0 | AS Vanséenne (11) |
| 134. | US St Martin-de-Valamas (12) | 3–0 | CS Châteauneuf-de-Galaure (12) |
| 135. | OS Vallée de l'Ouvèze (12) | 2–2 (4–2 p) | Diois FC (12) |
| 136. | US Lussas (12) | 0–1 | AS Coucouron (11) |
| 137. | Borussia Valence FC (13) | 1–4 | FC Rambertois (11) |
| 138. | AS Berg-Helvie (10) | 3–1 (Note: AS Berg-Helvie penalised for fielding a suspended player. Rhône Crussol Foot 07 qualify.) | Rhône Crussol Foot 07 (8) |
| 139. | US Vallée du Jabron (10) | 1–0 | FC Chabeuil (8) |
| 140. | FC Tricastin (9) | 2–4 | Olympique Rhodia (8) |
| 141. | FC Bourg-lès-Valence (9) | 7–3 | US Portes Hautes Cévennes (8) |
| 142. | SC Bourguesan (11) | 0–3 | Olympique Ruomsois (8) |
| 143. | AS Portugaise Valence (10) | 1–2 | US Davézieux-Vidalon (10) |
| 144. | RC Mauves (10) | 3–0 | US Montmeyran (11) |
| 145. | Entente Sarras Sports St Vallier (10) | 5–1 | IF Barbières-Bésayes-Rochefort-Samson-Marches (11) |
| 146. | Glun FC (13) | 2–4 | FR Allan (10) |
| 147. | FC La Coucourde (12) | 5–3 | US Beaufortoise (13) |
| 148. | RC Tournon-Tain (11) | 2–1 | US Ro-Claix (10) |
| 149. | AS Véore Montoison (10) | 0–2 | PS Romanaise (9) |
| 150. | US Croix du Fraysse (11) | 1–5 | FC Péageois (9) |
| 151. | AS St-Barthélemy-de-Vals (11) | 3–1 | FC Portois (9) |
| 152. | AAJ St-Alban-d'Ay (11) | 1–4 | FC Serrières-Sablons (9) |
| 153. | US Montélier (11) | 2–4 | ES Boulieu-lès-Annonay (10) |
| 154. | RC Savasson (12) | 0–3 | US Rochemaure (11) |
| 155. | Vallis Auréa Foot (11) | 3–2 | ES Malissardoise (11) |
| 156. | Espérance Hostunoise (10) | 3–0 | AS Valensolles (10) |
| 157. | US Vals-les-Bains (11) | 5–3 | FC Montélimar (10) |
| 158. | US Val d'Ay (10) | 2–2 (3–2 p) | ASF Pierrelatte (9) |
| 159. | FC Châtelet (10) | 3–3 (4–3 p) | FC Eyrieux Embroye (9) |
| 160. | Allex-Chabrillan-Eurre FC (11) | 3–2 (a.e.t.) | US Mours (9) |
| 161. | FC Félines-St Cyr-Peaugres (11) | 1–2 | FC Muzolais (10) |
| 162. | US St Gervais-sur-Roubion (12) | 3–3 (1–3 p) | US Bas-Vivarais (11) |
| 163. | US Ancône (11) | 1–10 | AS Donatienne (8) |
| 164. | AS Cornas (11) | 2–3 | CO Châteauneuvois (10) |
| 165. | ES Chomérac (10) | 1–4 | FC Annonay (9) |
| 166. | AS Cheyssieu (11) | 1–2 | Eyzin St Sorlin FC (12) |
| 167. | US Reventin (10) | 6–0 | CS Faramans (11) |
| 168. | AC Poisat (11) | 3–1 | ASCOL Foot 38 (12) |
| 169. | US St Paul-de-Varces (11) | 1–2 | FC Vallée de l'Hien (12) |
| 170. | US Beauvoir-Royas (11) | 1–2 | US Dolomoise (10) |
| 171. | AS St-Joseph-de-Rivière (11) | 1–3 | JS St Georgeoise (12) |
| 172. | CS Miribel (11) | 2–1 | FC La Sure (10) |
| 173. | Balbins-Ornacieux-Semons Sports (11) | 4–8 | ASL St Cassien (10) |
| 174. | Moirans FC (12) | 3–7 | CS Voreppe (10) |
| 175. | FC St Quentinois (11) | 3–1 | Amicale Tunisienne St Martin-d'Hères (10) |
| 176. | FC Liers (11) | 2–4 | Artas Charantonnay FC (10) |
| 177. | FC Agnin (13) | 1–3 | FC des Collines (11) |
| 178. | AS Cessieu | 1–3 | FC Allobroges Asafia (10) |
| 179. | Noyarey FC (10) | 1–2 | FC Versoud (9) |
| 180. | US Cassolards Passageois (12) | 1–0 | FC Bilieu (10) |
| 181. | US Montgasconnaise (12) | 4–3 (a.e.t.) | FC Balmes Nord-Isère (10) |
| 182. | US La Bâtie-Divisin (12) | 2–3 | Stade Châbonnais (11) |
| 183. | Formafoot Bièvre Valloire (10) | 0–10 | ES Rachais (8) |
| 184. | Deux Rochers FC (11) | 0–3 | AS Ver Sau (8) |
| 185. | CS Four (10) | 1–4 (a.e.t.) | Vallée du Guiers FC (8) |
| 186. | Rives SF (10) | 2–2 (3–4 p) | OC Eybens (8) |
| 187. | US Sassenage (9) | 2–3 | ES Manival (8) |
| 188. | US Creys-Morestel (10) | 2–3 | FC Varèze (8) |
| 189. | FC Crolles-Bernin (10) | 4–1 | FC Vallée de la Gresse (8) |
| 190. | US Ruy-Montceau (10) | 1–5 | Olympique Nord Dauphiné (8) |
| 191. | AS Tullins-Fures (10) | 2–4 | Olympique St Marcellin (8) |
| 192. | FC St Vulbas Plaine de l'Ain (10) | 3–3 (5–6 p) | AS Vézeronce-Huert (10) |
| 193. | AS Grésivaudan (10) | 0–2 | FOC Froges (13) |
| 194. | AS Fontaine (13) | 3–0 | UO Portugal St Martin-d'Hères (11) |
| 195. | US Corbelin (11) | 1–3 | Union Nord Iséroise (9) |
| 196. | FC Lauzes (10) | 1–2 | CS Nivolas-Vermelle (9) |
| 197. | AS Susville-Matheysine (11) | 2–4 | AS Italienne Européenne Grenoble (9) |
| 198. | US Beaurepairoise (11) | 1–2 | FC Voiron-Moirans (9) |
| 199. | FC Seyssins (9) | 3–1 | US Jarrie-Champ (9) |
| 200. | ES Pierre-Châtel (12) | 2–3 | FC Sud Isère (10) |
| 201. | ASJF Domène (10) | 0–3 | St Martin-d'Hères FC (9) |
| 202. | Isle d'Abeau FC (10) | 2–2 (5–4 p) | AS St André-le-Gaz (9) |
| 203. | Pays d'Allevard FC (11) | 5–4 (a.e.t.) | US Village Olympique Grenoble (12) |
| 204. | Le Grand-Lemps/Colombe/Apprieu Foot 38 (12) | 2–0 | EF des Étangs (12) |
| 205. | Olympique Belleroche Villefranche (8) | 3–0 | FC Franchevilloise (10) |
| 206. | Association Chandieu-Heyrieux (9) | 0–2 | AS Bron Grand Lyon (8) |
| 207. | Haute Brévenne Foot (9) | 0–2 (a.e.t.) | UF Belleville St Jean-d'Ardières (8) |
| 208. | ES Lierguoise (10) | 1–3 | CS Neuville (8) |
| 209. | Olympique Rillieux (9) | 0–3 | AS Algerienne Villeurbanne (8) |
| 210. | UO Tassin-la-Demi-Lune (10) | 1–2 | Caluire SC (8) |
| 211. | ES Chaponost (9) | 1–4 | AS Montchat Lyon (8) |
| 212. | AS St Martin-en-Haut (10) | 1–8 | AS Bellecour-Perrache (8) |
| 213. | CO St Fons (9) | 1–1 (5–4 p) | AL Mions (8) |
| 214. | FC Colombier-Satolas (10) | 6–2 | US Meyzieu (8) |
| 215. | FC Ste-Foy-lès-Lyon (10) | 1–5 | FC Chaponnay-Marennes (8) |
| 216. | Chambost-Allières-St Just-d'Avray (11) | 0–6 | FC Pontcharra-St Loup (8) |
| 217. | FC St Cyr Collonges au Mont d'Or (9) | 4–0 | US Millery-Vourles (8) |
| 218. | US Est Lyonnais (10) | 2–7 | Olympique St Genis-Laval (8) |
| 219. | CS Meginand (9) | 0–2 | Feyzin Club Belle Étoile (8) |
| 220. | Lyon Ouest SC (9) | 1–6 | FC Val Lyonnais (8) |
| 221. | AS Guéreins-Genouilleux (12) | 2–1 | Entente Odenas-Charentay-St Lager (10) |
| 222. | AS Villeurbanne Éveil Lyonnais (10) | 1–9 | AS Villefontaine (8) |
| 223. | US Reneins Vauxonne (11) | 0–3 | FC Veyle Sâone (8) |
| 224. | SO Pont-de-Chéruy-Chavanoz (9) | 3–1 | CS Lagnieu (8) |
| 225. | CS Viriat (8) | 8–0 | OS Beaujolais (11) |
| 226. | ES Frontonas-Chamagnieu (11) | 1–6 | FC Bressans (8) |
| 227. | US Montanay (11) | 2–4 (a.e.t.) | SC Portes de l'Ain (9) |
| 228. | Muroise Foot (11) | 1–2 | Ménival FC (9) |
| 229. | FC Rontalon (12) | 1–13 | FC Pays de l'Arbresle (10) |
| 230. | UGA Lyon-Décines (10) | 7–1 | Olympic Sathonay (11) |
| 231. | Latino AFC Lyon (12) | 1–2 | FC Franc Lyonnais (11) |
| 232. | AS Genay (12) | 0–1 | Rhône Sud FC (11) |
| 233. | AS Sornins Réunis (12) | 2–4 | FC St Fons (11) |
| 234. | FC Antillais Villeurbanne (12) | 1–4 | Lyon Croix Rousse Football (11) |
| 235. | AS Dardilly (12) | 2–5 (a.e.t.) | AS Buers Villeurbanne (11) |
| 236. | FC Croix Roussien (10) | 2–3 | ACS Mayotte du Rhône (11) |
| 237. | AS Toussieu (12) | 2–4 | Sud Azergues Foot (10) |
| 238. | JS Irigny (9) | 0–1 | FC Gerland Lyon (10) |
| 239. | AS Portugaise Vaulx-en-Velin (10) | 1–2 (a.e.t.) | FC Corbas (9) |
| 240. | Chazay FC (10) | 0–4 | AS Domarin (8) |
| 241. | AS Montmerle (12) | 1–2 | ES Gleizé (11) |
| 242. | US Loire-sur-Rhône (10) | 13–1 | AS Brignais (11) |
| 243. | AS Colomieu (12) | 0–4 | US Replonges (10) |
| 244. | FC Curtafond-Confrançon-St Martin-St Didier (11) | 0–3 | AS St Laurentin (10) |
| 245. | US St Cyr (12) | 0–8 | ES Val de Saône (10) |
| 246. | Entente St Martin du Frêne/Maillat/Combe du Val (11) | 3–1 | ASC Latino Americaine Europe (12) |
| 247. | FC Balan (12) | 5–2 (a.e.t.) | US Dombes-Chalamont (11) |
| 248. | US Vaulx-en-Velin (10) | 3–0 | CS Anatolia (11) |
| 249. | FC St-Romain-de-Popey (10) | 2–3 | US Côteaux Lyonnais (11) |
| 250. | FC Point du Jour (11) | 6–1 | FC Sud Ouest 69 (10) |
| 251. | Eveil Lyon (11) | 1–2 | AS Manissieux (10) |
| 252. | SC Maccabi Lyon (11) | 2–4 | GS Chasse-sur-Rhône (10) |
| 253. | FC Fontaines-sur-Saône (11) | 3–3 (4–3 p) | FC Rive Droite (10) |
| 254. | ASM St Pierre-la-Palud (11) | 4–5 (a.e.t.) | Beaujolais Football (10) |
| 255. | USC Lyon Vaise (11) | 6–2 (a.e.t.) | FC Grigny (9) |
| 256. | ASC Générale Routière Maïa Sonnier (12) | 0–2 | CS Vaulxois (11) |
| 257. | CAS Cheminots Oullins Lyon (11) | 1–4 | AS Craponne (9) |
| 258. | AS Grièges-Pont-de-Veyle (10) | 3–4 | FC Manziat (11) |
| 259. | AS Anglefort (13) | 0–5 | US Izernore (11) |
| 260. | ES Ambronay-St Jean-le-Vieux (11) | 6–4 | Valserine FC (10) |
| 261. | FC Veyle-Vieux-Jonc (12) | 5–3 | CS Chevroux (11) |
| 262. | US Berges du Rhône (11) | 0–4 | ES Revermontoise (10) |
| 263. | FC Bord de Veyle (12) | 1–2 | FO Bourg-en-Bresse (10) |
| 264. | CSJ Châtillonnaise (11) | 7–3 | Entente Bas Bugey Rhône (12) |
| 265. | AS Attignat (10) | 3–0 | AS Chaveyriat-Chanoz (11) |
| 266. | St Denis-Ambutrix FC (11) | 2–3 | Bresse Foot 01 (10) |
| 267. | AS Travailleurs Turcs Oyonnax (11) | 3–2 | Plaine Revermont Foot (10) |
| 268. | AS St-Étienne-sur-Chalaronne (13) | 0–7 | Concordia FC Bellegarde (10) |
| 269. | FC Injoux-Génissiat (13) | 0–3 | FC Serrières-Villebois (12) |
| 270. | Fareins Saône Vallée Foot (10) | 5–0 | FC Mas-Rillier (12) |
| 271. | CS Valromey (13) | 1–4 | Olympique St-Denis-lès-Bourg (11) |
| 272. | FC Plaine Tonique (9) | 1–0 | Bourg Sud (10) |
| 273. | JS Bresse Dombes (12) | 2–1 | FC Côtière-Luenaz (10) |
| 274. | AS Vertrieu (12) | 1–8 | AS Hautecourt-Romanèche (11) |
| 275. | US Formans (12) | 1–1 (5–4 p) | ES Cormoranche (11) |
| 276. | CS Belley (9) | – (Note: Match abandoned in extra time with the scoreline 4–3. US Nantua' penalised, CS Belley qualify.) | US Nantua (8) |
| 277. | ES Foissiat-Étrez (9) | 1–3 | Oyonnax Plastics Vallée FC (8) |
| 278. | Côtière Meximieux Villieu (12) | 2–3 | US Culoz Grand Colombier (9) |
| 279. | AS Bâgé-le-Châtel (10) | 3–0 | US Vonnas (11) |
| 280. | St Alban Sportif (10) | 2–0 | CS Ozon (11) |
| 281. | FC Denicé Arnas (11) | 6–2 | USF Tarare (10) |
| 282. | St Jean Sport (11) | 2–3 (a.e.t.) | Stade Amplepuisien (9) |
| 283. | Ambérieu FC (9) | 2–1 (a.e.t.) | US Arbent Marchon (8) |
| 284. | FC Priay (12) | 4–1 | Olympique Buyatin (11) |
| 285. | Association Portugais d'Oyonnax (12) | 3–3 (3–4 p) | Olympique Sud Revermont 01 (10) |
| 286. | FC Dombes (10) | 1–3 (a.e.t.) | FC Dombes-Bresse (9) |
| 287. | FC Bresse Nord (11) | 0–8 | AS Montréal-la-Cluse (9) |
| 288. | ES Charly Foot (10) | 3–4 | CS Verpillière (9) |
| 289. | FC Pays Viennois (11) | 2–9 | AS Grézieu-le-Marché (10) |
| 290. | Jassans-Frans Foot (9) | 3–1 | FC Lamure Poule (10) |
| 291. | ES Genas Azieu (9) | 3–0 | Olympique Villefontaine (10) |
| 292. | Cognin Sports (9) | 6–2 | Montmélian AF (9) |
| 293. | Entente Val d'Hyères (8) | 2–3 | US Motteraine (9) |
| 294. | US Chartreuse Guiers (9) | 1–5 | JS Chambéry (8) |
| 295. | Marthod Sport (11) | 1–3 | Nivolet FC (8) |
| 296. | CA Yenne (11) | 1–2 | US Pontoise (9) |
| 297. | US Domessin (12) | 2–0 | FC St Baldoph (11) |
| 298. | AJ Mayotte 73 (12) | 0–5 | Chambéry Sport 73 (10) |
| 299. | AS Brison-St Innocent (11) | 4–0 | Association Portugais Croix Rouge Chambéry (11) |
| 300. | ES Chanaz (12) | 0–2 | AS La Bridoire (11) |
| 301. | US La Ravoire (9) | 3–3 (0–3 p) | FC Chambotte (8) |
| 302. | FC Villargondran (11) | 0–3 | CA Maurienne (8) |
| 303. | FC St Michel-de-Maurienne (11) | 0–2 | FC Haute Tarentaise (9) |
| 304. | US Modane (11) | 3–6 | AS Cuines-La Chambre Val d'Arc (10) |
| 305. | AS Mont Jovet Bozel (12) | 5–2 | FC La Rochette (11) |
| 306. | FC Bauges (12) | 3–4 | AS Novalaise (10) |
| 307. | US Grignon (10) | 0–1 | AS Ugine (9) |
| 308. | UO Albertville (9) | 5–0 | St Pierre SF (11) |
| 309. | AS Haute Combe de Savoie (11) | 0–8 | USC Aiguebelle (10) |
| 310. | US Grand Mont La Bâthie (10) | 3–0 | FC Beaufortain Queige (12) |
| 311. | Cœur de Savoie (11) | 0–1 | FC Belle Étoile Mercury (9) |
| 312. | Biollay Pro FC (9) | 0–1 | ES Drumettaz-Mouxy (8) |
| 313. | AS St Forgeux (10) | 0–6 | AS Savigneux-Montbrison (8) |
| 314. | OC Ondaine (11) | 0–3 | US Villars (8) |
| 315. | ES Haut Forez (11) | 0–2 | FC St Étienne (8) |
| 316. | FC Montrambert Ricamar (11) | 2–7 | AC Rive-de-Gier (8) |
| 317. | FC Bords de Loire (12) | 4–2 | Olympique Les Avenières (10) (Note: Olympique Les Avenières replaced Bellegarde Sports in the original draw.) |
| 318. | US Filerin (11) | 1–2 | US Briennon (10) |
| 319. | Olympique Forez (12) | 0–10 | US Sud Forézienne (10) |
| 320. | FC Plaine Poncins (12) | 2–6 | FC St Joseph-St Martin (10) |
| 321. | AS Boën-Trelins (12) | 3–3 (5–4 p) | US Villerest (10) |
| 322. | FC St Charles Vigilante (11) | 4–1 | FC Genilac (12) |
| 323. | Nord Roannais (11) | 3–0 | ACL Mably (11) |
| 324. | Olympique St Étienne (12) | 1–4 | AS St Just-St Rambert (10) |
| 325. | SC Piraillon (13) | 1–7 | CF Estrablin (9) |
| 326. | St Étienne UC Terrenoire (11) | 2–3 | AS Châteauneuf (9) |
| 327. | ES St Christo-Marcenod (10) | 5–1 | ES Doizieux-La Terrasse-sur-Dorlay (11) |
| 328. | AS Finerbal (11) | 2–0 | ES Champdieu-Marcilly (10) |
| 329. | FC Montagnes du Matin (11) | 1–5 | AS Chambéon-Magneux (9) |
| 330. | FC Roanne Clermont (9) | 4–3 | US Renaisonnaise Apchonnaise (10) |
| 331. | Riorges FC (10) | 2–3 | FC Commelle-Vernay (9) |
| 332. | Olympique du Montcel (10) | 3–0 | Haut Pilat Interfoot (11) |
| 333. | CO La Rivière (12) | 0–2 | USG La Fouillouse (8) |
| 334. | FC St Paul-en-Jarez (9) | 4–0 | JS Cellieu (10) |
| 335. | CS St Anthème (12) | 2–4 | Forez Donzy FC (9) |
| 336. | FC Bourguisan (10) | 2–1 | Football Mont-Pilat (9) |
| 337. | AS Chausseterre-Les Salles (11) | 2–4 | AS Couzan (11) |
| 338. | FC Val d'Aix (11) | 0–2 | FC Loire Sornin (10) |
| 339. | Olympique Est Roannais (11) | 2–1 | FC Perreux (11) |
| 340. | ES Ouest Roannais (11) | 0–1 | CS Crémeaux (11) |
| 341. | US Bussières (11) | 1–4 | AS Noirétable (11) |
| 342. | AS St Cyr-les-Vignes (11) | 1–7 | FC Boisset-Chalain (10) |
| 343. | AS Astrée (12) | 0–6 | AF Pays de Coise (10) |
| 344. | US Metare St Étienne Sud-Est (11) | 0–2 | FCI St Romain-le-Puy (10) |
| 345. | Entente Plaine et Montagne (12) | 0–3 | ABH FC (12) |
| 346. | FEP Saint-Maurice-en-Gourgois (12) | 1–0 | FC Marcellinois (12) |
| 347. | ES Dyonisienne (11) | 0–4 | Roanne AS Parc du Sport (9) |
| 348. | Feu Vert St Chamond (11) | 2–3 | AS Algérienne Chambon-Feugerolles (8) |
| 349. | Olympique Le Coteau (10) | 3–1 | SEL St Priest-en-Jarez (8) |
| 350. | US Ecotay-Moingt (10) | 0–2 | US St Galmier-Chambœuf (8) |
| 351. | GS Dervaux Chambon-Feugerolles (9) | 2–3 | Sorbiers-La Talaudière (8) |
| 352. | SS Ussonaise (11) | 3–1 | CO St Étienne Sud (12) |
| 353. | AS Parigny (11) | 1–3 (Note: AS St Haon-le-Vieux penalised for fielding a suspended player. AS Parigny qualify.) | AS St Haon-le-Vieux (11) |
| 354. | Sury SC (11) | 7–2 | AJ Chapellois (12) |
| 355. | AS Aveizieux (11) | 1–4 | FC Chazelles (9) |
| 356. | AS Versonnex-Grilly-Sauverny (13) | 0–3 | Échenevex-Ségny-Chevry Olympique (11) |
| 357. | FC Vuache (11) | 1–2 | FC Frangy (10) |
| 358. | Football Sud Gessien (11) | 4–0 | US Challex (12) |
| 359. | FC Haut-Rhône (11) | 0–2 | US Divonne (9) |
| 360. | AS Ferney-Voltaire (11) | 0–10 | AS St Genis-Ferney-Crozet (9) |
| 361. | AS Prévessin-Moëns (11) | 1–2 | FC Cruseilles (9) |
| 362. | FC Anthy Sport (12) | 0–7 | CS Amphion Publier (8) |
| 363. | CS Vacheresse Vallée d'Abondance (12) | 0–2 | JS Reignier (9) |
| 364. | US Pers-Jussy (12) | 2–2 (3–5 p) | US Margencel (10) |
| 365. | FJ Ambilly (10) | 2–5 | SS Allinges (9) |
| 366. | FC Cessy-Gex (11) | 3–5 (a.e.t.) | FC Chéran (9) |
| 367. | Football St Jeoirien (12) | 0–3 | SC Morzine Vallée d'Aulps (10) |
| 368. | CS St Pierre (11) | 1–8 | ES Amancy (8) |
| 369. | CSL Perrignier (12) | 0–3 | FC Cranves-Sales (11) |
| 370. | AS Thonon (12) | 1–6 | CS Veigy-Foncenex (11) |
| 371. | FRS Champanges (12) | 1–2 | FC Ballaison (9) |
| 372. | CS Chamonix (12) | 0–5 | ES Thyez (10) |
| 373. | FC Combloux (11) | 2–3 | Marignier Sports (9) |
| 374. | FC Cluses (11) | 0–5 | CS Ayze (10) |
| 375. | CS Megève (12) | 0–7 | Haut Giffre FC (9) |
| 376. | FC Arenthon-Scientrier (12) | 1–2 | ASC Sallanches (10) |
| 377. | FC Gavot (12) | 1–6 | AG Bons-en-Chablais (9) |
| 378. | ES Sciez (11) | 1–6 | US Annemasse-Gaillard (8) |
| 379. | AJ Ville-la-Grand (10) | 3–1 | ES Douvaine-Loisin (11) |
| 380. | UC Turque Thonon-les-Bains (11) | 6–3 | US Vétraz-Monthoux (12) |
| 381. | AS Le Lyaud-Armoy (12) | 2–1 | ES Fillinges (10) |
| 382. | ES Viry (11) | 5–1 | FC Aravis (13) |
| 383. | FC Les Houches-Servoz (13) | 2–7 | ES Clusienne (11) |
| 384. | AS Cornier (12) | 0–9 | ES St Jeoire-La Tour (10) |
| 385. | CA Bonnevillois 1921 (12) | 0–3 | FC Foron (8) |
| 386. | FC Carroz d'Arâches (12) | 1–6 | US Mont Blanc (8) |
| 387. | FC Semine (11) | 2–1 (a.e.t.) | Beaumont Collonges FC (10) |
| 388. | ES Valleiry (10) | 0–4 | ES Cernex (10) |
| 389. | AS Sillingy (9) | 5–2 | FC La Filière (10) |
| 390. | FC Thônes (9) | 2–3 | US Pringy (8) |
| 391. | CO Chavanod (10) | 0–1 | AS Évires (11) |
| 392. | CS La Balme-de-Sillingy (10) | 1–2 (Note: AS Italienne Annecy penalised for fielding more transferred players than permitted. CS La Balme-de-Sillingy qualify.) | AS Italienne Annecy (12) |
| 393. | CSA Poisy (10) | 1–2 | ES Seynod (8) |
| 394. | AS Lac Bleu (11) | 2–3 | Olympique Cran (10) |
| 395. | FC Dingy-St Clair (12) | 0–4 | US Argonay (11) |
| 396. | ES Lanfonnet (12) | 1–2 | AS Parmelan Villaz (11) |
| 397. | FC Marigny-St Marcel (13) | 4–1 | AS Portugais Annecy (12) |
| 398. | ES Meythet (12) | 0–4 | US Semnoz-Vieugy (8) |
| 399. | AS Épagny-Metz-Tessy (13) | 2–5 (a.e.t.) | FC Marcellaz-Albanais (11) |

=== Second round ===
These matches were played on 31 August and 1 September 2019, with one rearranged for 8 September.

Second round results: Auvergne-Rhône-Alpes
| Tie no | Home team (tier) | Score | Away team (tier) |
|---|---|---|---|
| 1. | US Mozac (8) | 6–6 (7–6 p) | US St Gervaisienne (9) |
| 2. | CS Verpillière (9) | 0–3 | AS Savigneux-Montbrison (8) |
| 3. | AS Chadrac (8) | 2–1 | Sauveteurs Brivois (8) |
| 4. | Olympique Ruomsois (8) | 8–2 | FC Bourg-lès-Valence (9) |
| 5. | UGA Lyon-Décines (10) | 4–1 | ACS Mayotte du Rhône (11) |
| 6. | US Biachette Désertines (11) | 2–0 | Vigilante Garnat St Martin (9) |
| 7. | Entente Nord Lozère (8) | 1–0 | AS Sansacoise (8) |
| 8. | US Chapdes-Beaufort (10) | 0–1 | US St Beauzire (8) |
| 9. | FC St Didier-sous-Aubenas (12) | 2–2 (5–4 p) | CS Malataverne (13) |
| 10. | FC Pontcharra-St Loup (8) | 0–0 (2–4 p) | FC Val Lyonnais (8) |
| 11. | Olympique Cran (10) | 2–2 (4–3 p) | ES Seynod (8) |
| 12. | US Vendat (8) | 1–4 | AS Nord Vignoble (8) |
| 13. | AS Salignoise (11) | 0–3 | Commentry FC (9) |
| 14. | CS Vaux-Estivareilles (12) | 0–7 | AA Lapalisse (8) |
| 15. | AS St Angel (11) | 1–3 (a.e.t.) | US Lignerolles-Lavault Ste Anne (8) |
| 16. | AS Tronget (10) | 0–3 | FC Souvigny (10) |
| 17. | AL Quinssaines (10) | 3–0 (Note: Tie won by means of forfeit.) | AS Le Breuil (10) |
| 18. | ES Vernetoise (9) | 2–2 (4–1 p) | CS Bessay (9) |
| 19. | FR Pouzy-Mésangy (11) | 0–2 | JS Neuvy (10) |
| 20. | AS Val de Sioule (11) | 1–2 (a.e.t.) | AC Creuzier-le-Vieux (8) |
| 21. | US Saulcet-Le Theil (11) | 1–1 (9–10 p) | US Varennes-sur-Tèche (10) |
| 22. | Magnet-Suillet-St Gérand (11) | 1–3 | Bourbon Sportif (9) |
| 23. | Montluçon FC (11) | 3–2 | Stade St Yorre (9) |
| 24. | Bézenet-Doyet Foot (8) | 2–1 | Médiéval Club Montluçonnais (9) |
| 25. | US St Victor (11) | 1–3 | AS Neuilly-le-Réal (11) |
| 26. | AS Gennetinoise (10) | 3–1 | AS Varennes-sur-Allier (8) |
| 27. | AS Louchy (8) | 2–3 (a.e.t.) | AS Dompierroise (9) |
| 28. | US Vals Le Puy (10) | 3–2 | US Arsac-en-Velay (9) |
| 29. | AS Loudes (8) | 1–4 | Retournac Sportif (8) |
| 30. | US Monistrol (8) | 3–0 | FC Aurec (9) |
| 31. | US Bains-St Christophe (9) | 0–4 | FC Dunières (8) |
| 32. | AS Grazac-Lapte (9) | 1–3 | AS Villettoise (9) |
| 33. | AS Laussonne (9) | 2–1 | US Fontannoise (8) |
| 34. | AS St Didier-St Just (8) | 2–0 | Olympic St Julien-Chapteuil (8) |
| 35. | St Georges SL (12) | 0–3 | Carladez-Goul Sportif (9) |
| 36. | US Murat (9) | 3–1 | ES St Mamet (9) |
| 37. | AS Ayrens-St Illide (10) | 1–0 | CS Vézac (9) |
| 38. | AS Pleaux-Rilhac-Barriac (10) | 0–4 | CS Arpajonnais (8) |
| 39. | US Crandelles (9) | 4–1 | ES Pierrefortaise (9) |
| 40. | RC Laqueuille (11) | 1–3 (a.e.t.) | ES Riomois-Condat (9) |
| 41. | FC Massiac-Molompize-Blesle (9) | 2–4 (a.e.t.) | FC Artense (9) |
| 42. | Cère FC Vic/Polminhac (10) | 1–2 | Sud Cantal Foot (8) |
| 43. | US Besse (11) | 0–1 | AS Belbexoise (9) |
| 44. | AS Moissat (10) | 2–4 (a.e.t.) | US Les Martres-de-Veyre (8) |
| 45. | FC Blanzat (10) | 2–4 | US Courpière (10) |
| 46. | FC Nord Limagne (9) | 1–2 (a.e.t.) | Clermont Métropole FC (9) |
| 47. | AS Job (10) | 3–0 | RC Charbonnières-Paugnat (11) |
| 48. | ACS Cappadoce (11) | 0–1 | US Maringues (8) |
| 49. | FC Châtel-Guyon (8) | 4–2 | FC Lezoux (9) |
| 50. | US Gerzat (10) | 3–4 | SC Billom (9) |
| 51. | Ecureuils Franc Rosier (10) | 3–0 | FC Plauzat-Champeix (10) |
| 52. | Clermont Ouvoimoja (10) | 0–0 (7–6 p) | AS Romagnat (9) |
| 53. | FC Mirefleurs (10) | 1–5 | US Issoire (8) |
| 54. | US Combronde (12) | 3–6 | FC Chauriat (10) |
| 55. | ES St Rémy-sur-Durolle (11) | 1–2 | AS Enval-Marsat (8) |
| 56. | Espérance Ceyratois Football (8) | 3–1 | AS Orcines (9) |
| 57. | US Ennezat (9) | 7–1 | CSA Brassacois Florinois (10) |
| 58. | ES Thuret (12) | 1–2 | SC Gannat (10) |
| 59. | AS Noirétable (11) | 0–3 | ES St Germinoise (8) |
| 60. | US Messeix Bourg-Lastic (12) | 4–2 | FC St Julien-de-Coppel (10) |
| 61. | US Rochemaure (11) | 1–0 | US Drôme Provence (12) |
| 62. | Olympiqe St Quentinois (10) | 0–2 (a.e.t.) | FC des Collines (11) |
| 63. | ES Trèfle (13) | 0–2 | AS Rhodanienne (10) |
| 64. | AS St Félicien (13) | 1–3 | US Peyrins (13) |
| 65. | FC Larnage-Serves (11) | 3–2 (a.e.t.) | ES St Jeure-d'Ay-Marsan (12) |
| 66. | FC Cheylarois (11) | 0–4 | AS Dolon (11) |
| 67. | US St Just-St Marcel (11) | 2–2 (2–3 p) | ES Nord Drôme (12) |
| 68. | Olympique Centre Ardèche (10) | 4–1 | AS Vallée du Doux (11) |
| 69. | AS Roiffieux (12) | 7–0 | AS Désaignes (13) |
| 70. | FC Bren (12) | 1–3 | JS St-Paul-lès-Romans (12) |
| 71. | FC Clérieux-St Bardoux-Granges-les-Beaumont (12) | 2–3 | US Pont-La Roche (10) |
| 72. | US Vals-les-Bains (11) | 2–0 | US Val d'Ay (10) |
| 73. | US Montgasconnaise (12) | 3–2 (a.e.t.) | Espérance Hostunoise (10) |
| 74. | FC Muzolais (10) | 1–2 | Vallis Auréa Foot (11) |
| 75. | CO Châteauneuvois (10) | 0–1 | FC Annonay (9) |
| 76. | FC Châtelet (10) | 2–0 | Allex-Chabrillan-Eurre FC (11) |
| 77. | US Bas-Vivarais (11) | 2–1 | AS Donatienne (8) |
| 78. | AS Coucouron (11) | 1–3 | AS Roussas-Granges-Gontardes (11) |
| 79. | OS Vallée de l'Ouvèze (12) | 7–1 | US St Martin-de-Valamas (12) |
| 80. | ES Boulieu-lès-Annonay (10) | 2–1 | FC Serrières-Sablons (9) |
| 81. | RC Tournon-Tain (11) | 4–1 | Entente Sarras Sports St Vallier (10) |
| 82. | US Vallée du Jabron (10) | 0–1 | AS Homenetmen Bourg-lès Valence (11) |
| 83. | AS St-Barthélemy-de-Vals (11) | 3–2 (a.e.t.) | PS Romanaise (9) |
| 84. | FC Péageois (9) | 1–2 (4–3 p) | FR Allan (10) |
| 85. | RC Mauves (10) | 1–3 | US Davézieux-Vidalon (10) |
| 86. | FC La Coucourde (12) | 1–5 | US Reventin' (10) |
| 87. | Eyzin St Sorlin FC (12) | 0–5 | Olympique Rhodia (8) |
| 88. | AC Poisat (11) | 0–0 (4–3 p) | FC Vallée de l'Hien (12) |
| 89. | US Dolomoise (10) | 3–1 | JS St Georgeoise (12) |
| 90. | CS Miribel (11) | 2–4 | ASL St Cassien (10) |
| 91. | CS Voreppe (10) | 3–2 (a.e.t.) | FC St Quentinois (11) |
| 92. | Artas Charantonnay FC (10) | 2–1 | FC Allobroges Asafia (10) |
| 93. | US Cassolards Passageois (12) | 0–5 | FC Versoud (9) |
| 94. | Pays d'Allevard FC (11) | 2–1 | Stade Châbonnais (11) |
| 95. | ES Rachais (8) | 1–0 | AS Ver Sau (8) |
| 96. | Vallée du Guiers FC (8) | 1–2 (a.e.t.) | OC Eybens (8) |
| 97. | FC Varèze (8) | 5–1 | ES Manival (8) |
| 98. | FC Crolles-Bernin (10) | 1–2 | Olympique Nord Dauphiné (8) |
| 99. | AS Vézeronce-Huert (10) | 0–3 | Olympique St Marcellin (8) |
| 100. | FOC Froges (13) | 3–4 | AS Fontaine (13) |
| 101. | Union Nord Iséroise (9) | 2–1 | CS Nivolas-Vermelle (9) |
| 102. | FC Seyssins (9) | 4–1 | AS Italienne Européenne Grenoble (9) |
| 103. | Isle d'Abeau FC (10) | 1–3 | FC Voiron-Moirans (9) |
| 104. | FC Sud Isère (10) | 5–5 (4–2 p) | St Martin-d'Hères FC (9) |
| 105. | Le Grand-Lemps/Colombe/Apprieu Foot 38 (12) | 0–3 | ES Genas Azieu (9) |
| 106. | UF Belleville St Jean-d'Ardières (8) | 1–2 | Olympique Belleroche Villefranche (8) |
| 107. | AS Bron Grand Lyon (8) | 1–1 (3–5 p) | Caluire SC (8) |
| 108. | CS Neuville (8) | 2–0 (a.e.t.) | FC Bressans (8) |
| 109. | AS Algerienne Villeurbanne (8) | 2–0 | Olympique St Genis-Laval (8) |
| 110. | AS Montchat Lyon (8) | 2–0 | SO Pont-de-Chéruy-Chavanoz (9) |
| 111. | FC Balan (12) | 0–3 | AS Bellecour-Perrache (8) |
| 112. | AS Guéreins-Genouilleux (12) | 1–1 (4–5 p) | CO St Fons (9) |
| 113. | FC Colombier-Satolas (10) | 0–1 | AS Villefontaine (8) |
| 114. | FC Chaponnay-Marennes (8) | 3–1 | FC St Cyr Collonges au Mont d'Or (9) |
| 115. | Feyzin Club Belle Étoile (8) | 7–0 | SC Portes de l'Ain (9) |
| 116. | ES Gleizé (11) | 1–4 | FC Veyle Sâone (8) |
| 117. | AS Domarin (8) | 3–1 | CS Viriat (8) |
| 118. | Ménival FC (9) | 2–1 | FC Gerland Lyon (10) |
| 119. | FC Pays de l'Arbresle (10) | 6–0 | Beaujolais Football (10) |
| 120. | FC Franc Lyonnais (11) | 3–14 | AS Buers Villeurbanne (11) |
| 121. | Rhône Sud FC (11) | 1–5 | FC Manziat (11) |
| 122. | FC St Fons (11) | 2–5 | FC Fontaines-sur-Saône (11) |
| 123. | Lyon Croix Rousse Football (11) | 5–0 | Sud Azergues Foot (10) |
| 124. | FC Corbas (9) | 0–1 | AS St Laurentin (10) |
| 125. | US Loire-sur-Rhône (10) | 1–4 | US Vaulx-en-Velin (10) |
| 126. | US Replonges (10) | 2–4 | ES Val de Saône (10) |
| 127. | Entente St Martin du Frêne/Maillat/Combe du Val (11) | 0–2 | US Izernore (11) |
| 128. | US Côteaux Lyonnais (11) | 3–2 (a.e.t.) | FC Point du Jour (11) |
| 129. | AS Manissieux (10) | 7–0 | ES Ambronay-St Jean-le-Vieux (11) |
| 130. | GS Chasse-sur-Rhône (10) | 2–4 | AS Craponne (9) |
| 131. | USC Lyon Vaise (11) | 5–3 | CS Vaulxois (11) |
| 132. | FC Veyle-Vieux-Jonc (12) | 1–8 | FO Bourg-en-Bresse (10) |
| 133. | ES Revermontoise (10) | 3–4 (a.e.t.) | AS Attignat (10) |
| 134. | CSJ Châtillonnaise (11) | 1–7 | Concordia FC Bellegarde (10) |
| 135. | JS Bresse Dombes (12) | 2–2 (2–4 p) | Bresse Foot 01 (10) |
| 136. | AS Travailleurs Turcs Oyonnax (11) | 4–0 | FC Serrières-Villebois (12) |
| 137. | US Formans (12) | 0–2 | Fareins Saône Vallée Foot (10) |
| 138. | Olympique St-Denis-lès-Bourg (11) | 1–8 | Ambérieu FC (9) |
| 139. | AS Hautecourt-Romanèche (11) | 0–5 (a.e.t.) | FC Plaine Tonique (9) |
| 140. | AS Bâgé-le-Châtel (10) | 0–2 | Oyonnax Plastics Vallée FC (8) |
| 141. | St Alban Sportif (10) | 4–0 | FC Denicé Arnas (11) |
| 142. | Stade Amplepuisien (9) | 2–1 | Jassans-Frans Foot (9) |
| 143. | FC Priay (12) | 0–4 | FC Dombes-Bresse (9) |
| 144. | Olympique Sud Revermont 01 (10) | 1–2 | AS Montréal-la-Cluse (9) |
| 145. | Cognin Sports (9) | 2–0 | FC Chambotte (8) |
| 146. | JS Chambéry (8) | 6–1 | US Motteraine (9) |
| 147. | US Domessin (12) | 0–6 | Nivolet FC (8) |
| 148. | Chambéry Sport 73 (10) | 2–3 | AS Ugine (9) |
| 149. | AS Brison-St Innocent (11) | 1–2 | AS Novalaise (10) |
| 150. | CA Maurienne (8) | 4–0 | UO Albertville (9) |
| 151. | AS Mont Jovet Bozel (12) | 1–9 | FC Haute Tarentaise (9) |
| 152. | AS Cuines-La Chambre Val d'Arc (10) | 5–1 | USC Aiguebelle (10) |
| 153. | US Grand Mont La Bâthie (10) | 0–8 | ES Drumettaz-Mouxy (8) |
| 154. | US Villars (8) | 3–1 | FC St Étienne (8) |
| 155. | FC St Charles Vigilante (11) | 0–4 | AC Rive-de-Gier (8) |
| 156. | FC Bords de Loire (12) | 0–4 | US Sud Forézienne (10) |
| 157. | AS Boën-Trelins (12) | 3–2 (a.e.t.) | US Briennon (10) |
| 158. | FC St Joseph-St Martin (10) | 0–1 | Nord Roannais (11) |
| 159. | AS St Just-St Rambert (10) | 1–0 | FC St Paul-en-Jarez (9) |
| 160. | CF Estrablin (9) | 1–2 | USG La Fouillouse (8) |
| 161. | AS Châteauneuf (9) | 3–2 (a.e.t.) | Olympique du Montcel (10) |
| 162. | ES St Christo-Marcenod (10) | 4–1 | FCI St Romain-le-Puy (10) |
| 163. | AS Finerbal (11) | 1–0 | Olympique Est Roannais (11) |
| 164. | AS Chambéon-Magneux (9) | 1–2 (a.e.t.) | FC Roanne Clermont (9) |
| 165. | CS Crémeaux (11) | 2–3 | FC Commelle-Vernay (9) |
| 166. | ABH FC (12) | 0–3 | Forez Donzy FC (9) |
| 167. | FC Bourguisan (10) | 2–1 | AS Algérienne Chambon-Feugerolles (8) |
| 168. | AS Couzan (11) | 5–0 | FEP Saint-Maurice-en-Gourgois (12) |
| 169. | FC Loire Sornin (10) | 3–1 | FC Boisset-Chalain (10) |
| 170. | AF Pays de Coise (10) | 1–0 | Roanne AS Parc du Sport (9) |
| 171. | Olympique Le Coteau (10) | 0–3 | US St Galmier-Chambœuf (8) |
| 172. | SS Ussonaise (11) | 2–0 | Sorbiers-La Talaudière (8) |
| 173. | FC Chazelles (9) | 2–0 | AS Grézieu-le-Marché (10) |
| 174. | US Pontoise (9) | 3–4 | FC Frangy (10) |
| 175. | Échenevex-Ségny-Chevry Olympique (11) | 6–0 | Football Sud Gessien (11) |
| 176. | US Divonne (9) | 4–0 | AS St Genis-Ferney-Crozet (9) |
| 177. | ES Viry (11) | 2–3 | FC Cruseilles (9) |
| 178. | CS Amphion Publier (8) | 2–1 | FC Ballaison (9) |
| 179. | JS Reignier (9) | 3–1 (a.e.t.) | AS Sillingy (9) |
| 180. | US Margencel (10) | 1–2 | CS Veigy-Foncenex (11) |
| 181. | AS Parmelan Villaz (11) | 0–6 | SS Allinges (9) |
| 182. | SC Morzine Vallée d'Aulps (10) | 0–2 | 'FC Foron (8) |
| 183. | AS Le Lyaud-Armoy (12) | 1–2 | ES Amancy (8) |
| 184. | FC Cranves-Sales (11) | 0–5 | US Annemasse-Gaillard (8) |
| 185. | ES Thyez (10) | 3–2 | Haut Giffre FC (9) |
| 186. | ES Clusienne (11) | 5–0 | Marignier Sports (9) |
| 187. | CS Ayze (10) | 4–4 (4–3 p) | AG Bons-en-Chablais (9) |
| 188. | ASC Sallanches (10) | 4–4 (2–3 p) | AS Évires (11) |
| 189. | AJ Ville-la-Grand (10) | 1–0 (a.e.t.) | UC Turque Thonon-les-Bains (11) |
| 190. | ES St Jeoire-La Tour (10) | 2–1 | US Mont Blanc (8) |
| 191. | ES Cernex (10) | 1–2 (a.e.t.) | US Pringy (8) |
| 192. | US Argonay (11) | 1–0 | FC Marcellaz-Albanais (11) |
| 193. | FC Marigny-St Marcel (13) | 1–1 (2–3 p) | AS La Bridoire (11) |
| 194. | Olympique St Montanais (12) | 2–3 | AS St Barthélemy-Grozon (12) |
| 195. | CS La Balme-de-Sillingy (10) | 2–4 | US Semnoz-Vieugy (8) |
| 196. | FC Rambertois (11) | 0–4 | Rhône Crussol Foot 07 (8) |
| 197. | AS Parigny (11) | 0–2 | Sury SC (11) |
| 198. | FC Semine (11) | 1–0 | FC Chéran (9) |
| 199. | CS Belley (9) | 4–3 (a.e.t.) | US Culoz Grand Colombier (9) |

=== Intermediate cadrage round ===
These matches were played on 8 September 2019.

Intermediate round results: Auvergne-Rhône-Alpes
| Tie no | Home team (tier) | Score | Away team (tier) |
|---|---|---|---|
| 1. | AS Roiffieux (12) | 1–2 (a.e.t.) | JS St-Paul-lès-Romans (12) |
| 2. | FC Chauriat (10) | 3–2 | US Varennes-sur-Tèche (10) |
| 3. | US Vals Le Puy (10) | 4–1 | US Crandelles (9) |
| 4. | US Sud Forézienne (10) | 1–2 | FC Pays de l'Arbresle (10) |
| 5. | ES Val de Saône (10) | 3–0 | AS Attignat (10) |
| 6. | AS La Bridoire (11) | 1–2 | JS Reignier (9) |

=== Third round ===
These matches were played on 14 and 15 September 2019. The qualifying team from Saint Pierre et Miquelon are included in this round.

Third round results: Auvergne-Rhône-Alpes
| Tie no | Home team (tier) | Score | Away team (tier) |
|---|---|---|---|
| 1. | FC Lyon (7) | 5–1 | (Saint Pierre and Miquelon) A.S. Îlienne Amateur |
| 2. | US Biachette Désertines (11) | 0–1 | AC Creuzier-le-Vieux (8) |
| 3. | JS Neuvy (10) | 1–0 | Clermont Métropole FC (9) |
| 4. | AS Neuilly-le-Réal (11) | 3–1 (a.e.t.) | AL Quinssaines (10) |
| 5. | AA Lapalisse (8) | 1–0 | Lempdes Sport (7) |
| 6. | Bézenet-Doyet Foot (8) | 2–1 | US St Georges / Les Ancizes (6) |
| 7. | SC Gannat (10) | 2–0 | AS Dompierroise (9) |
| 8. | AS Cheminots St Germain (7) | 4–3 (a.e.t.) | Cébazat Sports (7) |
| 9. | Montluçon FC (11) | 2–1 | AS Nord Vignoble (8) |
| 10. | SC St Pourcain (7) | 0–7 | CS Pont-du-Château (7) |
| 11. | FC Roanne Clermont (9) | 0–0 (4–3 p) | Montluçon Football (5) |
| 12. | AS Gennetinoise (10) | 0–4 | AS Domerat (6) |
| 13. | FC Souvigny (10) | 3–2 | ES Vernetoise (9) |
| 14. | US Maringues (8) | 1–3 (a.e.t.) | US Mozac (8) |
| 15. | Bourbon Sportif (9) | 1–0 | US Lignerolles-Lavault Ste Anne (8) |
| 16. | Commentry FC (9) | 0–5 | AS Moulins (6) |
| 17. | RC Vichy (6) | 5–0 | SCA Cussét (7) |
| 18. | FC Riom (6) | 4–0 | AS Emblavez-Vorey (7) |
| 19. | AS Laussonne (9) | 1–4 | AS Chadrac (8) |
| 20. | US Courpière (10) | 3–3 (5–6 p) | SC Langogne (7) |
| 21. | SC Billom (9) | 3–1 | FC Dunières (8) |
| 22. | CS Volvic (6) | 1–2 | FCO Firminy-Insersport (7) |
| 23. | FC Chauriat (10) | 0–11 | US Saint-Flour (5) |
| 24. | AS Villettoise (9) | 2–7 (a.e.t.) | US Sucs et Lignon (7) |
| 25. | SS Ussonaise (11) | 0–5 | SA Thiers (5) |
| 26. | AS Job (10) | 1–3 | US Ennezat (9) |
| 27. | AS Enval-Marsat (8) | 1–1 (3–4 p) | FCUS Ambert (7) |
| 28. | Retournac Sportif (8) | 1–6 | US Monistrol (8) |
| 29. | FC Châtel-Guyon (8) | 2–5 | FC Espaly (6) |
| 30. | FC Cournon-d'Auvergne (7) | 3–1 | AS St Jacques (6) |
| 31. | US Beaumontoise (7) | 3–1 | AS St Didier-St Just (8) |
| 32. | AS Ayrens-St Illide (10) | 2–3 | Clermont Ouvoimoja (10) |
| 33. | US St Beauzire (8) | 1–3 | Sud Cantal Foot (8) |
| 34. | US Messeix Bourg-Lastic (12) | 2–3 | Carladez-Goul Sportif (9) |
| 35. | US Blavozy (6) | 1–2 (a.e.t.) | Velay FC (6) |
| 36. | FC Ally Mauriac (7) | 0–1 | FC Aurillac Arpajon Cantal Auvergne (5) |
| 37. | US Vals Le Puy (10) | 2–3 (a.e.t.) | US Issoire (8) |
| 38. | US Murat (9) | 3–1 (a.e.t.) | Sporting Chataigneraie Cantal (6) |
| 39. | ES Riomois-Condat (9) | 2–2 (7–8 p) | UJ Clermontoise (7) |
| 40. | Ecureuils Franc Rosier (10) | 0–3 | Ytrac Foot (6) |
| 41. | AS Belbexoise (9) | 0–1 | Association Vergongheon-Arvant (7) |
| 42. | ES St Germinoise (8) | 0–3 (a.e.t.) | CS Arpajonnais (8) |
| 43. | US Vic-le-Comte (7) | 2–1 (a.e.t.) | Espérance Ceyratois Football (8) |
| 44. | FC Artense (9) | 0–8 | US Brioude (7) |
| 45. | FA Le Cendre (7) | 2–0 | US Les Martres-de-Veyre (8) |
| 46. | Entente Nord Lozère (8) | 3–0 | US Vallée de l'Authre (7) |
| 47. | Vallis Auréa Foot (11) | 3–1 | US Vals-les-Bains (11) |
| 48. | Caluire SC (8) | 0–3 | Olympique Rhodia (8) |
| 49. | FC St Didier-sous-Aubenas (12) | 0–3 | FC Annonay (9) |
| 50. | AS Sud Ardèche (7) | 4–3 (a.e.t.) | FC Valdaine (7) |
| 51. | OS Vallée de l'Ouvèze (12) | 3–0 | AS Rhodanienne (10) |
| 52. | US Davézieux-Vidalon (10) | 4–1 | US Bas-Vivarais (11) |
| 53. | AS St-Barthélemy-de-Vals (11) | 0–1 | FC Châtelet (10) |
| 54. | AS Roussas-Granges-Gontardes (11) | 0–8 | FC Rhône Vallées (6) |
| 55. | ES Boulieu-lès-Annonay (10) | 0–1 | Olympique Centre Ardèche (10) |
| 56. | JS St-Paul-lès-Romans (12) | 0–3 | FC Péageois (9) |
| 57. | AS Dolon (11) | 1–2 | Olympique Ruomsois (8) |
| 58. | US Rochemaure (11) | 1–8 | Rhône Crussol Foot 07 (8) |
| 59. | AS St Barthélemy-Grozon (12) | 3–2 (a.e.t.) | FC Larnage-Serves (11) |
| 60. | AS Homenetmen Bourg-lès Valence (11) | 0–3 (a.e.t.) | Football Côte St André (7) |
| 61. | SC Cruas (7) | 3–1 | MOS Trois Rivières (7) |
| 62. | ES Nord Drôme (12) | 0–1 | FC Limonest (5) |
| 63. | RC Tournon-Tain (11) | 0–7 | Olympique de Valence (6) |
| 64. | US Peyrins (13) | 0–6 | US Pont-La Roche (10) |
| 65. | FO Bourg-en-Bresse (10) | 2–5 | Ambérieu FC (9) |
| 66. | Concordia FC Bellegarde (10) | 1–0 | FC Veyle Sâone (8) |
| 67. | CS Neuville (8) | 1–2 | Chassieu Décines FC (6) |
| 68. | CO St Fons (9) | 1–7 | FC Bords de Saône (7) |
| 69. | Bresse Foot 01 (10) | 6–0 | US Vaulx-en-Velin (10) |
| 70. | FC Dombes-Bresse (9) | 1–6 | Olympique St Marcellin (8) |
| 71. | AS St Laurentin (10) | 0–5 | AS Misérieux-Trévoux (7) |
| 72. | Feyzin Club Belle Étoile (8) | 4–2 | CS Belley (9) |
| 73. | FC Plaine Tonique (9) | 0–3 | US Feillens (7) |
| 74. | Entente Crest-Aouste (7) | 3–0 | FC Chaponnay-Marennes (8) |
| 75. | FC Manziat (11) | 0–7 | Ain Sud Foot (5) |
| 76. | AS Algerienne Villeurbanne (8) | 3–0 | UMS Montélimar (6) |
| 77. | AS Buers Villeurbanne (11) | 0–7 | FC Charvieu-Chavagneux (7) |
| 78. | FC Voiron-Moirans (9) | 1–2 | FC Seyssins (9) |
| 79. | US Côteaux Lyonnais (11) | 1–5 | AS Domarin (8) |
| 80. | ES Rachais (8) | 1–3 | FC Vaulx-en-Velin (5) |
| 81. | Olympique Belleroche Villefranche (8) | 1–0 | Olympique Nord Dauphiné (8) |
| 82. | FC Fontaines-sur-Saône (11) | 2–5 (a.e.t.) | AS Montchat Lyon (8) |
| 83. | Union Nord Iséroise (9) | 0–5 | ES Bressane Marboz (7) |
| 84. | US Gières (7) | 2–1 | AS Bellecour-Perrache (8) |
| 85. | FC Pays de l'Arbresle (10) | 3–1 | FC Chazelles (9) |
| 86. | FC Versoud (9) | 0–1 | Vénissieux FC (7) |
| 87. | Fareins Saône Vallée Foot (10) | 1–3 | FC Varèze (8) |
| 88. | AS Manissieux (10) | 3–4 | Sud Lyonnais Foot (7) |
| 89. | Lyon Croix Rousse Football (11) | 2–4 | Ménival FC (9) |
| 90. | USC Lyon Vaise (11) | 2–5 | UGA Lyon-Décines (10) |
| 91. | ES Val de Saône (10) | 0–7 | AS Chavanay (7) |
| 92. | AS Couzan (11) | 3–6 (a.e.t.) | FC Roche-St Genest (7) |
| 93. | Stade Amplepuisien (9) | 1–0 | ES St Christo-Marcenod (10) |
| 94. | Sury SC (11) | 0–1 | AS Châteauneuf (9) |
| 95. | AS Savigneux-Montbrison (8) | 2–1 (a.e.t.) | L'Étrat-La Tour Sportif (7) |
| 96. | AC Rive-de-Gier (8) | 0–3 | Hauts Lyonnais (5) |
| 97. | FC Commelle-Vernay (9) | 0–5 | US Feurs (6) |
| 98. | AF Pays de Coise (10) | 1–2 | Domtac FC (7) |
| 99. | AS St Just-St Rambert (10) | 2–5 | Roannais Foot 42 (7) |
| 100. | AS Finerbal (11) | 4–5 | FC Bourguisan (10) |
| 101. | St Chamond Foot (7) | 4–3 (a.e.t.) | FC Val Lyonnais (8) |
| 102. | Forez Donzy FC (9) | 5–2 | FC Loire Sornin (10) |
| 103. | Nord Roannais (11) | 1–2 | US Villars (8) |
| 104. | USG La Fouillouse (8) | 0–3 | US St Galmier-Chambœuf (8) |
| 105. | ES Veauche (7) | 1–1 (4–5 p) | Côte Chaude Sportif (7) |
| 106. | AS Boën-Trelins (12) | 0–3 | AS Craponne (9) |
| 107. | US Pringy (8) | 2–3 | AC Seyssinet (7) |
| 108. | AS Travailleurs Turcs Oyonnax (11) | 1–2 | Aix-les-Bains FC (6) |
| 109. | OC Eybens (8) | 1–0 | US Semnoz-Vieugy (8) |
| 110. | FC Belle Étoile Mercury (9) | 0–5 | FC Bourgoin-Jallieu (5) |
| 111. | AS Villefontaine (8) | 3–1 (a.e.t.) | Chambéry SF (5) |
| 112. | FC La Tour-St Clair (7) | 5–0 (Note: Tie reversed from original draw.) | AS Fontaine (13) |
| 113. | AS Ugine (9) | 5–0 | JS Chambéry (8) |
| 114. | AC Poisat (11) | 1–1 (6–7 p) | ES Genas Azieu (9) |
| 115. | US Reventin (10) | 4–2 | ES Drumettaz-Mouxy (8) |
| 116. | AS Novalaise (10) | 2–3 (a.e.t.) | Nivolet FC (8) |
| 117. | Pays d'Allevard FC (11) | 1–5 | CA Maurienne (8) |
| 118. | CS Voreppe (10) | 0–8 | FC Échirolles (6) |
| 119. | US Dolomoise (10 | 1–0 | Artas Charantonnay FC (10) |
| 120. | FC des Collines (11) | 3–1 | Cognin Sports (9) |
| 121. | AS Évires (11) | 3–1 (a.e.t.) | FC Sud Isère (10) |
| 122. | US Montgasconnaise (12) | 0–5 | ASL St Cassien (10) |
| 123. | AS Cuines-La Chambre Val d'Arc (10) | 1–6 | FC Salaise (6) |
| 124. | FC Frangy (10) | 0–4 | CS Amphion Publier (8) |
| 125. | ES Thyez (10) | 0–1 | US Annemasse-Gaillard (8) |
| 126. | ES Chilly (7) | 5–0 | FC Semine (11) |
| 127. | FC Cruseilles (9) | 2–3 (a.e.t.) | US Annecy-le-Vieux (7) |
| 128. | ES Clusienne (11) | 0–5 | GFA Rumilly-Vallières (5) |
| 129. | Oyonnax Plastics Vallée FC (8) | 1–0 | ES Tarentaise (7) |
| 130. | CS Veigy-Foncenex (11) | 0–3 | Thonon Évian FC (6) |
| 131. | ES St Jeoire-La Tour (10) | 0–3 | JS Reignier (9) |
| 132. | ES Amancy (8) | 4–4 (3–4 p) | FC Foron (8) |
| 133. | US Argonay (11) | 0–2 | FC Haute Tarentaise (9) |
| 134. | US Izernore (11) | 2–4 | SS Allinges (9) |
| 135. | AS Montréal-la-Cluse (9) | 3–4 (4–5 p) | US Divonne (9) |
| 136. | St Alban Sportif (10) | 1–4 | Olympique Cran (10) |
| 137. | AJ Ville-la-Grand (10) | 1–2 | CS Ayze (10) |
| 138. | Échenevex-Ségny-Chevry Olympique (11) | 1–8 | Cluses-Scionzier FC (6) |

=== Fourth round ===
These matches were played on 28 and 29 September 2019.

Fourth round results: Auvergne-Rhône-Alpes
| Tie no | Home team (tier) | Score | Away team (tier) |
|---|---|---|---|
| 1. | CS Arpajonnais (8) | 0–2 | FC Chamalières (4) |
| 2. | Sud Cantal Foot (8) | 0–4 | FC Aurillac Arpajon Cantal Auvergne (5) |
| 3. | FA Le Cendre (7) | 1–2 | FC Cournon-d'Auvergne (7) |
| 4. | FC Riom (6) | 2–1 | US Beaumontoise (7) |
| 5. | Entente Nord Lozère (8) | 4–1 | US Murat (9) |
| 6. | SC Billom (9) | 0–3 | Velay FC (6) |
| 7. | US Brioude (7) | 1–2 | US Mozac (8) |
| 8. | US Ennezat (9) | 5–3 | Carladez-Goul Sportif (9) |
| 9. | US Issoire (8) | 4–0 | US Vic-le-Comte (7) |
| 10. | Association Vergongheon-Arvant (7) | 0–1 | US Saint-Flour (5) |
| 11. | Clermont Ouvoimoja (10) | 3–4 | Ytrac Foot (6) |
| 12. | Montluçon FC (11) | 2–1 | SC Gannat (10) |
| 13. | SA Thiers (5) | 2–1 | AS Domerat (6) |
| 14. | AC Creuzier-le-Vieux (8) | 2–0 | Bézenet-Doyet Foot (8) |
| 15. | AS Chadrac (8) | 1–2 | FC Espaly (6) |
| 16. | US Monistrol (8) | 1–2 | UJ Clermontoise (7) |
| 17. | JS Neuvy (10) | 0–5 | Moulins Yzeure Foot (4) |
| 18. | Bourbon Sportif (9) | 2–3 | AA Lapalisse (8) |
| 19. | CS Pont-du-Château (7) | 1–0 | AS Cheminots St Germain (7) |
| 20. | FC Souvigny (10) | 2–1 | AS Neuilly-le-Réal (11) |
| 21. | FC Bourguisan (10) | 3–0 | SC Langogne (7) |
| 22. | AS Moulins (6) | 3–1 | US Sucs et Lignon (7) |
| 23. | FCUS Ambert (7) | 3–1 | RC Vichy (6) |
| 24. | Vallis Auréa Foot (11) | 0–1 | Forez Donzy FC (9) |
| 25. | US Dolomoise (10) | 1–3 | US Davézieux-Vidalon (10) |
| 26. | US Pont-La Roche (10) | 0–3 | Rhône Crussol Foot 07 (8) |
| 27. | Entente Crest-Aouste (7) | 2–3 | SC Cruas (7) |
| 28. | Olympique Centre Ardèche (10) | 1–2 | Hauts Lyonnais (5) |
| 29. | AS Châteauneuf (9) | 0–2 | AS Sud Ardèche (7) |
| 30. | US Reventin (10) | 1–5 | FC Limonest (5) |
| 31. | FC Châtelet (10) | 0–3 | Olympique Rhodia (8) |
| 32. | US Villars (8) | 0–3 | FC Rhône Vallées (6) |
| 33. | AS Chavanay (7) | 1–2 | Chassieu Décines FC (6) |
| 34. | Olympique Ruomsois (8) | 3–2 (a.e.t.) | Roannais Foot 42 (7) |
| 35. | AS Savigneux-Montbrison (8) | 0–3 | US Feurs (6) |
| 36. | FC Annonay (9) | 0–0 (4–5 p) | Côte Chaude Sportif (7) |
| 37. | AS St Barthélemy-Grozon (12) | 0–12 | US St Galmier-Chambœuf (8) |
| 38. | FC Péageois (9) | 2–1 | ASL St Cassien (10) |
| 39. | FC Roche-St Genest (7) | 2–1 | Andrézieux-Bouthéon FC (4) |
| 40. | FCO Firminy-Insersport (7) | 1–1 (1–3 p) | St Chamond Foot (7) |
| 41. | Ambérieu FC (9) | 0–3 | Monts d'Or Anse Foot (4) |
| 42. | AS Domarin (8) | 0–1 | AS Saint-Priest (4) |
| 43. | Stade Amplepuisien (9) | 1–5 | AS Misérieux-Trévoux (7) |
| 44. | FC Pays de l'Arbresle (10) | 2–1 | FC Salaise (6) |
| 45. | FC Varèze (8) | 2–1 | FC Bords de Saône (7) |
| 46. | FC Roanne Clermont (9) | 0–4 | Football Côte St André (7) |
| 47. | Domtac FC (7) | 0–3 | Olympique de Valence (6) |
| 48. | AS Montchat Lyon (8) | 8–3 | Olympique Belleroche Villefranche (8) |
| 49. | Aix-les-Bains FC (6) | 2–3 | FC Lyon (7) |
| 50. | Sud Lyonnais Foot (7) | 0–2 | FC Vaulx-en-Velin (5) |
| 51. | ES Genas Azieu (9) | 0–2 | AS Algerienne Villeurbanne (8) |
| 52. | FC des Collines (11) | 1–3 | AS Villefontaine (8) |
| 53. | OS Vallée de l'Ouvèze (12) | 0–3 | Feyzin Club Belle Étoile (8) |
| 54. | Ménival FC (9) | 3–1 | US Feillens (7) |
| 55. | AS Craponne (9) | 3–1 | Bresse Foot 01 (10) |
| 56. | UGA Lyon-Décines (10) | 0–4 | FC Bourgoin-Jallieu (5) |
| 57. | CS Ayze (10) | 2–5 | CA Maurienne (8) |
| 58. | FC Haute Tarentaise (9) | 0–1 | FC Foron (8) |
| 59. | US Annecy-le-Vieux (7) | 2–0 | Vénissieux FC (7) |
| 60. | US Divonne (9) | 0–1 | FC La Tour-St Clair (7) |
| 61. | SS Allinges (9) | 0–4 | ES Chilly (7) |
| 62. | CS Amphion Publier (8) | 2–3 (a.e.t.) | AC Seyssinet (7) |
| 63. | US Semnoz-Vieugy (8) | 5–1 | FC Seyssins (9) |
| 64. | Nivolet FC (8) | 0–2 | FC Charvieu-Chavagneux (7) |
| 65. | Olympique Cran (10) | 1–10 | Ain Sud Foot (5) |
| 66. | FC Échirolles (6) | 4–1 | ES Bressane Marboz (7) |
| 67. | JS Reignier (9) | 1–0 | US Gières (7) |
| 68. | Oyonnax Plastics Vallée FC (8) | 1–2 | GFA Rumilly-Vallières (5) |
| 69. | AS Évires (11) | 1–6 | US Annemasse-Gaillard (8) |
| 70. | Olympique St Marcellin (8) | 1–2 | AS Ugine (9) |
| 71. | Cluses-Scionzier FC (6) | 1–1 (4–5 p) | Annecy FC (4) |
| 72. | Concordia FC Bellegarde (10) | 0–5 | Thonon Évian FC (6) |

=== Fifth round ===
These matches were played on 11, 12 and 13 October 2019.

Fifth round results: Auvergne-Rhône-Alpes
| Tie no | Home team (tier) | Score | Away team (tier) |
|---|---|---|---|
| 1. | Montluçon FC (11) | 5–2 | AC Creuzier-le-Vieux (8) |
| 2. | FC Foron (8) | 0–2 | Thonon Évian FC (6) |
| 3. | AS Montchat Lyon (8) | 1–2 | Annecy FC (4) |
| 4. | ES Chilly (7) | 1–0 | AS Villefontaine (8) |
| 5. | FC Bourgoin-Jallieu (5) | 3–2 (a.e.t.) | FC Échirolles (6) |
| 6. | AS Ugine (9) | 0–7 | Football Bourg-en-Bresse Péronnas 01 (3) |
| 7. | JS Reignier (9) | 0–2 | US Annecy-le-Vieux (7) |
| 8. | FC La Tour-St Clair (7) | 0–1 | CA Maurienne (8) |
| 9. | AS Misérieux-Trévoux (7) | 2–2 (8–7 p) | AC Seyssinet (7) |
| 10. | FC Charvieu-Chavagneux (7) | 2–0 | Feyzin Club Belle Étoile (8) |
| 11. | US Davézieux-Vidalon (10) | 3–6 | FC Limonest (5) |
| 12. | Football Côte St André (7) | 1–3 | FC Vaulx-en-Velin (5) |
| 13. | SC Cruas (7) | 3–1 | Olympique Rhodia (8) |
| 14. | FC Varèze (8) | 2–6 | Olympique de Valence (6) |
| 15. | FC Rhône Vallées (6) | 0–4 | AS Saint-Priest (4) |
| 16. | FC Lyon (7) | 2–0 | Olympique Ruomsois (8) |
| 17. | AS Algerienne Villeurbanne (8) | 4–3 (a.e.t.) | Ménival FC (9) |
| 18. | FC Péageois (9) | 0–2 | Chassieu Décines FC (6) |
| 19. | Ain Sud Foot (5) | 1–0 | GFA Rumilly-Vallières (5) |
| 20. | US Annemasse-Gaillard (8) | 4–2 | US Semnoz-Vieugy (8) |
| 21. | FC Chamalières (4) | 0–2 | Le Puy Foot 43 Auvergne (3) |
| 22. | US Ennezat (9) | 2–2 (1–3 p) | US Saint-Flour (5) |
| 23. | US Issoire (8) | 0–1 | FC Aurillac Arpajon Cantal Auvergne (5) |
| 24. | CS Pont-du-Château (7) | 0–3 | Moulins Yzeure Foot (4) |
| 25. | FC Souvigny (10) | 1–3 | Ytrac Foot (6) |
| 26. | US Mozac (8) | 2–2 (5–4 p) | FC Riom (6) |
| 27. | FC Cournon-d'Auvergne (7) | 1–0 | UJ Clermontoise (7) |
| 28. | Entente Nord Lozère (8) | 0–4 | AS Moulins (6) |
| 29. | St Chamond Foot (7) | 4–3 | SA Thiers (5) |
| 30. | Rhône Crussol Foot 07 (8) | 2–5 | AS Lyon-Duchère (3) |
| 31. | FC Espaly (6) | 1–2 | Monts d'Or Anse Foot (4) |
| 32. | Velay FC (6) | 1–0 | FCUS Ambert (7) |
| 33. | Forez Donzy FC (9) | 0–4 | Côte Chaude Sportif (7) |
| 34. | FC Bourguisan (10) | 0–4 | Hauts Lyonnais (5) |
| 35. | AA Lapalisse (8) | 1–2 | US St Galmier-Chambœuf (8) |
| 36. | FC Pays de l'Arbresle (10) | 0–3 (a.e.t.) | FC Roche-St Genest (7) |
| 37. | AS Craponne (9) | 4–1 | US Feurs (6) |
| 38. | AS Sud Ardèche (7) | 0–1 | FC Villefranche (3) |

=== Sixth round ===
These matches were played on 26 and 27 October 2019.

Sixth round results: Auvergne-Rhône-Alpes
| Tie no | Home team (tier) | Score | Away team (tier) |
|---|---|---|---|
| 1. | US Mozac (8) | 3–2 (a.e.t.) | AS Saint-Priest (4) |
| 2. | FC Vaulx-en-Velin (5) | – (Note: Original scoreline 2–1. FC Vaulx-en-Velin penalised for fielding too many transferred players. Olympique de Valence qualify.) | Olympique de Valence (6) |
| 3. | FC Bourgoin-Jallieu (5) | 3–2 (a.e.t.) | Ain Sud Foot (5) |
| 4. | CA Maurienne (8) | 0–3 | FC Limonest (5) |
| 5. | ES Chilly (7) | 1–0 | SC Cruas (7) |
| 6. | AS Misérieux-Trévoux (7) | 0–1 | FC Villefranche (3) |
| 7. | FC Charvieu-Chavagneux (7) | 0–4 | Football Bourg-en-Bresse Péronnas 01 (3) |
| 8. | AS Algerienne Villeurbanne (8) | 3–4 | Chassieu Décines FC (6) |
| 9. | Thonon Évian FC (6) | 1–0 | Monts d'Or Anse Foot (4) |
| 10. | US Annemasse-Gaillard (8) | 0–7 | Annecy FC (4) |
| 11. | FC Roche-St Genest (7) | 0–1 | Moulins Yzeure Foot (4) |
| 12. | US St Galmier-Chambœuf (8) | 2–0 | FC Aurillac Arpajon Cantal Auvergne (5) |
| 13. | Ytrac Foot (6) | 0–1 | Le Puy Foot 43 Auvergne (3) |
| 14. | Hauts Lyonnais (5) | 0–0 (5–4 p) | AS Lyon-Duchère (3) |
| 15. | Côte Chaude Sportif (7) | 2–0 | St Chamond Foot (7) |
| 16. | AS Moulins (6) | 0–4 | US Saint-Flour (5) |
| 17. | Montluçon FC (11) | 0–1 | FC Cournon-d'Auvergne (7) |
| 18. | FC Lyon (7) | 4–1 (a.e.t.) | Velay FC (6) |
| 19. | AS Craponne (9) | 0–1 | US Annecy-le-Vieux (7) |
