= Sébastien Cuvier =

French footballer (born 1970)

Personal information
- Full name: Sébastien Cuvier
- Date of birth: 9 September 1970 (age 56)
- Place of birth: Le Havre, France
- Height: 1.83 m (6 ft 0 in)
- Position: Forward

Senior career*
Years	Team	Apps	(Gls)
1987–1991	Le Havre B	53	(17)
1991–1992	Beauvais	13	(0)
1992–1994	Avranches	59	(25)
1994–1995	Bourges	30	(5)
1995–1996	Troyes	32	(22)
1996–1997	Istres	27	(13)
1997–1998	Poitiers	35	(10)
1998–1999	Valenciennes	22	(4)
1999–2001	Pacy Vallée-d'Eure	53	(7)
2001–2002	Fréjus	20	(1)
2002–2004	Jura Sud	26	(4)
2004–2005	Imphy Decize	?	(?)
2005–2006	Beauvais	1	(0)

Managerial career
- 2008–: Jura Sud
- * Club domestic league appearances and goals

Sébastien Cuvier (born 9 September 1970) is a French former professional footballer who played as a forward. During a playing career spanning almost 20 years, he assisted 12 different clubs, mostly in the French lower leagues. Cuvier made 13 appearances in Division 2 for Beauvais during the 1991–92 season.

As of October 2025, Cuvier is the manager of Championnat de France amateur side FC Nueillaubiers, having joined the club in Summer 2022.
