= Centre Culturel et Sportif =

Indoor stadium in Saint-Pierre, France

- Interactive map of Centre Culturel et Sportif
- Full name: English: Cultural and Sports Centre
- Location: Saint-Pierre, Saint Pierre and Miquelon
- Coordinates: 46°46′30.19″N 56°10′45.23″W

Centre Culturel et Sportif is a multi-use outdoor and indoor stadium in Saint-Pierre, Saint-Pierre and Miquelon, France. It is currently used mostly for rugby, futsal matches and athletics. The venue hosts all matches of the Saint Pierre and Miquelon Futsal Championship.
