= 2020 Ligue de Football de Saint Pierre et Miquelon =

Ligue de Football de Saint Pierre et Miquelon
- Season: 2020
- Dates: 27 June – 19 September 2020
- Champions: Miquelonnaise
- Coupe de France: Miquelonnaise
- Matches: 18
- Goals: 59 (3.28 per match)
- Biggest home win: ASM 4–0 ASIA (1 Aug 2020)
- Biggest away win: Tied: 0–2 (3 times)
- Highest scoring: ASIA 3–4 ASSP (9 Sep 2020)
- Longest winning run: ASM (2 matches) (27 Jun–4 Jul)
- Longest unbeaten run: ASM (3 matches) (27 Jun–8 Jul)
- Longest winless run: ASIA (7 matches) (27 Jun–12 Aug)
- Longest losing run: ASIA (4 matches) (14 Jul–12 Aug)
- All statistics correct as of 19 December 2020.

The 2020 Ligue de Football de Saint Pierre et Miquelon was the 35th season of top-division football in Saint Pierre and Miquelon. Three clubs competed in the league: AS Saint Pierraise, A.S. Miquelonnaise and A.S. Ilienne Amateur. Due to the COVID-19 pandemic, the season was truncated to 12 matches instead of 16. The season began on 27 June 2020 instead of its normal May beginning and concluded on 19 September 2020.

Miquelonnaise won the championship, earning their first title since 2008.

== Clubs ==
Location of teams in the Ligue de SPM 2020

Team	Home city	Home ground
Ilienne Amateur	Saint-Pierre	Stade Léonce Claireaux
Miquelonnaise	Miquelon-Langlade	Stade de l'Avenir
Saint Pierraise	Saint-Pierre	Stade Léonce Claireaux

== Table ==
Pos	Team	Pld	W	D	L	GF	GA	GD	Pts	Qualification or relegation
1	Miquelonnaise (C)	12	5	5	2	25	14	+11	32	Champions
2	Saint Pierraise	12	5	4	3	19	17	+2	31	
3	Ilienne Amateur	12	2	3	7	15	28	−13	21	

Updated to match(es) played on 21 September 2020.
Source: https://www.rsssf.org/tabless/stpierre2020.html
(C) Champions
