= Ligue de football de Saint-Pierre-et-Miquelon =

Football league in Saint Pierre and Miquelon

- Founded: 1976
- First season: 1976
- Country: Saint Pierre and Miquelon
- Confederation: FFF
- Number of clubs: 3
- Level on pyramid: 1
- International cup: Coupe de France
- Most championships: Ilienne Amateur (28)
- Current: 2025 Ligue de Football de Saint Pierre et Miquelon

The Ligue de football de Saint-Pierre-et-Miquelon is the regional football association of the French overseas collectivity of Saint Pierre and Miquelon. The term can also refer to the territory's football league. The current President is Ludivine Quédinet.

== League ==
In Saint-Pierre and Miquelon there are three amateur clubs, playing only one level. The league is played from the beginning of June to the end of September each year due to climatic conditions.

The league was organized primarily by Louis Quedinet who would go on to be president of the league for eighteen years. For his efforts, he was inducted into the Newfoundland and Labrador Soccer Hall of Fame in 2013.

== Clubs ==
Club	City
A.S. Ilienne Amateur	Saint-Pierre
A.S. Miquelonnaise	Miquelon
A.S. Saint Pierraise	Saint-Pierre

== League champions ==
- 1976: AS Ilienne Amateur
- 1977: AS Ilienne Amateur
- 1978: AS Ilienne Amateur
- 1979: AS Ilienne Amateur
- 1980: AS Ilienne Amateur
- 1981: AS Ilienne Amateur
- 1982: AS Ilienne Amateur
- 1983: AS Ilienne Amateur
- 1984: AS Ilienne Amateur
- 1985: AS Ilienne Amateur
- 1986: AS Ilienne Amateur
- 1987: AS Ilienne Amateur
- 1988: AS Saint-Pierraise
- 1989: AS Ilienne Amateur
- 1990: AS Ilienne Amateur
- 1991: AS Ilienne Amateur
- 1992: AS Saint-Pierraise
- 1993: AS Saint-Pierraise
- 1994: AS Saint-Pierraise
- 1995: AS Saint-Pierraise
- 1996: AS Ilienne Amateur
- 1997: AS Saint-Pierraise
- 1998: AS Saint-Pierraise
- 1999: AS Miquelonnaise
- 2000: AS Saint-Pierraise
- 2001: AS Saint-Pierraise
- 2002: AS Ilienne Amateur
- 2003: AS Ilienne Amateur
- 2004: AS Ilienne Amateur
- 2005: AS Miquelonnaise
- 2006: AS Ilienne Amateur
- 2007: AS Saint-Pierraise
- 2008: AS Miquelonnaise
- 2009: AS Ilienne Amateur
- 2010: AS Ilienne Amateur
- 2011: AS Ilienne Amateur
- 2012: AS Ilienne Amateur
- 2013: AS Ilienne Amateur
- 2014: AS Ilienne Amateur
- 2015: AS Saint-Pierraise
- 2016: AS Saint-Pierraise
- 2017: AS Ilienne Amateur
- 2018: AS Ilienne Amateur
- 2019: AS Saint-Pierraise
- 2020: AS Miquelonnaise
- 2021: AS Miquelonnaise
- 2022: AS Saint-Pierraise
- 2023: AS Miquelonnaise
- 2024: AS Saint-Pierraise
- 2025: AS Miquelonnaise

== See also ==
- National team: Saint Pierre and Miquelon national football team
