= AS Miquelonnaise =

A.S. Miquelonnaise
- Full name: Association Sportive Miquelonnaise
- Nicknames: ASM; Les Oranges
- Founded: 1949
- Ground: Stade de l'Avenir; Miquelon-Langlade, Saint-Pierre, Saint Pierre and Miquelon
- Capacity: 200
- Club President: Bonnieul Gino
- Manager: Mathieu Brunin
- League: Ligue SPM
- 2020: 1st
- Website: https://asmiquelonnaise.footeo.com/

Association Sportive Miquelonnaise is a Saint Pierre and Miquelon football club which currently competes in the Ligue SPM. The club plays its home fixtures at Stade de l'Avenir. Since the 2022 season the team has been managed by Loïc Richonnier.

== History ==
The club was founded in 1949 on Miquelon Island. It competed in the 2018–19 Coupe de France, the first edition of the tournament to feature a team from Saint Pierre and Miquelon. However, they were defeated 1–0 in the first preliminary round by fellow Ligue SPM club AS Saint Pierraise and, therefore, did not get the opportunity to compete in Metropolitan France against non-local opponents.

== Honours ==
- Coupe de l'Archipel: 9

1993, 1997, 2000, 2004, 2005, 2008, 2009, 2013, 2021

- St. Pierre and Miquelon Championship: 5

1999, 2005, 2008, 2020, 2021
