= AS Îlienne Amateur =

A.S. Îlienne Amateur
- Full name: Association Sportive Îlienne Amateur
- Nickname: A.S.I.A
- Founded: 1953
- Ground: Stade John Girardin; Saint-Pierre, Saint Pierre and Miquelon
- Capacity: 1400
- Club President: Ludivine Quedinet
- Manager: Francesco Da Costa
- League: Ligue SPM
- 2020: 3rd

Association Sportive Îlienne Amateur is a Saint Pierre and Miquelon football club which currently competes in the Ligue SPM. The club plays its home fixtures at Stade John Girardin. With 28 League titles and 25 Coupe de l'Archipel titles (including at least 22 doubles) the club is the most successful in the territory's history.

== History ==
The club was founded in 1953. The team was founded primarily by Louis Quedinet who would go on to be president of the club for thirty years and of the SPM League for eighteen years. For his efforts, he was inducted into the Newfoundland and Labrador Soccer Hall of Fame in 2013.

In 1979 the team won the Challenge Cup of Newfoundland, Canada and earned the right to represent the province at the national Challenge Trophy via a final which feature two teams from Saint Pierre and was therefore held on the island. However, the Newfoundland association nullified the victory because it did not want a French team representing it at the national tournament. Teams from Saint Pierre and Miquelon have not been invited to participate in the tournament thereafter.

For the 2019–20 season, A.S. Ilienne Amateur became the second team from Saint Pierre and Miquelon to compete in Metropolitan France in the Coupe de France after teams from the island entered the tournament for the first time in 2018–19. Prior to its Third Round match against FC Lyon, A.S.I.A toured the Groupama Stadium home of Ligue 1 side Olympique Lyonnais. The match ended in a 1–5 defeat, ending the club's campaign for the year.

== Stadium ==
The team plays its home matches at the 1,400-seat Stade John Girardin.

== Honours ==
As of 17 March 2020

- Trophées Nickelson: 1960
- Trophée Crease: 1963
- Newfoundland Challenge Cup: 1979
- Newfoundland Minister's Cup: 1984
- Coupe du Territoire: 16

1964, 1965, 1966, 1967, 1968, 1969, 1970, 1971, 1972, 1973, 1974, 1975, 1978, 1984, 1989, 1994, 1998

- Coupe de l'Archipel: 26

1976, 1977, 1978, 1979, 1980, 1981, 1982, 1983, 1985, 1986, 1987, 1988, 1991, 1992, 1995, 1996, 2002, 2003, 2006, 2010, 2011, 2012, 2014, 2017, 2018, 2024

- St. Pierre and Miquelon Championship: 28

1976, 1977, 1978, 1979, 1980, 1981, 1982, 1983, 1984, 1985, 1986, 1987, 1989, 1990, 1991, 1996, 2002, 2003, 2004, 2006, 2009, 2010, 2011, 2012, 2013, 2014, 2017, 2018
