= AS Saint Pierraise =

- Full name: Association Sportive Saint-Pierraise
- Nickname(s): ASSP
- Founded: 1903; 122 years ago
- Ground: Stade Léonce Claireaux; Saint-Pierre, Saint Pierre and Miquelon
- Capacity: 500
- League: Ligue SPM
- 2020: 2nd
- Website: https://www.assp.pm/page/1065661-accueil
Home colours

Association Sportive Saint-Pierraise or ASSP, is a Saint Pierre and Miquelon football club. Founded in 1903, the club is the oldest football team on the island. The club plays their home fixtures at Stade Léonce Claireaux. Its official colours are green and white.

The club advanced to the third round of the 2018–19 Coupe de France, the first edition of the tournament to feature a team from Saint Pierre and Miquelon. The team was eventually eliminated by a narrow 1–2 defeat to ALC Longvic of the Ligue Bourgogne-Franche-Comté dE Football (VII). Maël Kello made history as the first Saint Pierre and Miquelon player to score in the tournament. The club has also competed in the Coupe de Normandie.

== Roster ==
As of 20 June 2019.
Note: Flags indicate national team as defined under FIFA eligibility rules; some limited exceptions apply. Players may hold more than one non-FIFA nationality.

No.	Pos.	Nation	Player
—	GK	Saint Pierre and Miquelon	Simon Hebditch
—	DF	Saint Pierre and Miquelon	Jean-Baptiste Borotra
—	FW	Saint Pierre and Miquelon	Arthur Lepape
—	DF	Saint Pierre and Miquelon	Nicolas Bry
—	MF	Saint Pierre and Miquelon	Tristan Girardin

No.	Pos.	Nation	Player
—	MF	Saint Pierre and Miquelon	Maël Kello
—	MF	Saint Pierre and Miquelon	Matthieu Demontreux
—	MF	Saint Pierre and Miquelon	Mehdi Colmay
—	FW	Saint Pierre and Miquelon	Arnaud Roulet

== Honours ==
- Territory Cup: 1972
- Coupe de l'Archipel: 1990, 1999, 2001, 2007, 2020
- St. Pierre and Miquelon Championship: 1987, 1993, 1994, 1995, 1997, 1998, 2000, 2001, 2007, 2015, 2016, 2019, 2022
