= 2020–21 Coupe de France preliminary rounds, overseas departments and territories =

French Competition

The 2020–21 Coupe de France preliminary rounds, overseas departments and territories, made up the qualifying competition to decide which teams from the French Overseas Departments and Territories took part in the main competition from the seventh round.

The six (or more, if required) preliminary rounds were organised by the 6 Regional leagues of the overseas departments and territories. They took place between February and October 2020.

In 2019–20 JS Saint-Pierroise from Réunion survived longest in the competition, beating Ligue 2 Niort in the ninth round, before eventually losing to Épinal in the round of 32, equalling the record for an overseas team's progression in the competition.

== Mayotte ==
Originally, a total of 60 teams from Régionale 1, Régional 2, Régionale 3 and Régionale 4 divisions were registered for the qualifying tournament. The original structure of the tournament required a preliminary round with four ties between Régionale 4 teams; Régionale 2 and Régionale 3 teams entering at the first round stage and Régionale 1 teams entering at the second round stage. The draw for the preliminary round was made on 13 February 2020. Note that the Mayotte League continue to refer to the preliminary round as the first round, and the naming convention used here is to bring the rounds in line with other regions and territories.

=== Preliminary round (Mayotte) ===
These matches were played on 23 February 2020.

Preliminary round results: Mayotte
Tie no	Home team (tier)	Score	Away team (tier)
1.	(Mayotte) M'bouini Elan Espoir Club (R4)	0–2	FC Ylang de Koungou (R4) (Mayotte)
2.	(Mayotte) FMJ Vahibé (R4)	0–2 (Note: Result challenged, Espoir Mtsapéré still qualify.)	Espoir Mtsapéré (R4) (Mayotte)
3.	(Mayotte) CJ Mronabéja (R4)	4–2	FCO Tsingoni (R4) (Mayotte)
4.	(Mayotte) Feu du Centre (R4)	3–2	AS Kahani (R4) (Mayotte)

Note: Mayotte League structure (no promotion to French League structure):

- Régionale 1 (R1)
- Régionale 2 (R2)
- Régionale 3 (R3)
- Régionale 4 (R4)

=== Suspension of the competition due to COVID-19 ===
Only the preliminary round was played before the suspension of all competition due to the COVID-19 pandemic in Mayotte. On 6 July 2020, due to the state of health emergency being extended until the end of October, and the lack of any date for competition to commence, the Mayotte League were contacted by the FFF regarding how the qualifying teams would be selected. The league elected to consult with its clubs.

=== Reconfiguration and restart ===
On 27 September 2020, the Comité de Direction announced a planned restart of the competition, with 64 teams remaining, including the four qualified from the first round. The second round draw was scheduled for 9 October 2020 with matches taking place on 24 October 2020.

On 9 October, the Commission Régionale Sportive et des Terrains published the draw for the first and second rounds. The first round features the teams from divisions lower than Régional 1, including those victorious in the original preliminary round, participating in 25 ties with two teams given byes to the second round. The second round includes the teams from Régional 1, with 7 ties and 25 teams given byes to the third round. The draw for the third and fourth rounds was made on 27 October 2020. The draw for the fifth round was made on 3 November 2020. The draw for the sixth round was made on 9 November 2020.

=== First round (Mayotte) ===
These matches were played on 17 and 18 October 2020.

First round results: Mayotte
Tie no	Home team (tier)	Score	Away team (tier)
1.	(Mayotte) Choungui FC (R3)	6–2	TCO Mamoudzou (R3) (Mayotte)
2.	(Mayotte) Espoir Club de Longoni (R4)	2–1	ASC Abeilles (R2) (Mayotte)
3.	(Mayotte) RC Barakani (R3)	0–2	Foudre 2000 (R2) (Mayotte)
4.	(Mayotte) ACSJ M'Liha (R4)	4–2	AJ Kani-Kéli (R2) (Mayotte)
5.	(Mayotte) Lance Missile (R4)	2–4	Olympique de Miréréni (R2) (Mayotte)
6.	(Mayotte) CS M'ramadoudou (R4)	0–7	AS Neige (R2) (Mayotte)
7.	(Mayotte) Etincelles Hamjago (R3)	2–2 (2–4 p)	FC Mtsankandro (R4) (Mayotte)
8.	(Mayotte) N'Drema Club (R3)	1–2 (Note: FC Labbatoir penalised for fielding too many transferred players. N'Drema Club qualify.)	FC Labattoir (R2) (Mayotte)
9.	(Mayotte) VCO Vahibé (R3)	– (Note: Tie won by means of forfeit.)	FC Sohoa (R3) (Mayotte)
10.	(Mayotte) Espoir Mtsapéré (R4)	0–1	Racine du Nord (R3) (Mayotte)
11.	(Mayotte) Feu du Centre (R4)	2–0	AS Papillon d'Honneur (R4) (Mayotte)
12.	(Mayotte) AS Defense de Kawéni (R2)	0–1	FC Chiconi (R3) (Mayotte)
13.	(Mayotte) USC Labattoir (R3)	1–0	FC Ylang de Koungou (R4) (Mayotte)
14.	(Mayotte) Espérance d'Iloni (R3)	2–1	Bandrélé FC (R2) (Mayotte)
15.	(Mayotte) Maharavo FC (R4)	1–2	US Kavani (R3) (Mayotte)
16.	(Mayotte) FC Kani-Bé (R3)	2–3	FC Majicavo (R2) (Mayotte)
17.	(Mayotte) AJ Mtsahara (R3)	2–1	ASCEE Nyambadao (R4) (Mayotte)
18.	(Mayotte) ASC Wahadi (R3)	2–1	CJ Mronabéja (R4) (Mayotte)
19.	(Mayotte) US Bandréle (R4)	2–5	USJ Tsararano (R4) (Mayotte)
20.	(Mayotte) Mahabou SC (R3)	1–1 (4–5 p)	AOE Chiconi (R3) (Mayotte)
21.	(Mayotte) USC Kangani (R2)	0–4	Pamandzi SC (R3) (Mayotte)
22.	(Mayotte) Enfant du Port (R3)	2–0	AS Ongojou (R4) (Mayotte)
23.	(Mayotte) FC Shingabwé (R4)	3–1	US Mtsangamboua (R4) (Mayotte)
24.	(Mayotte) ASJ Handréma (R3)	2–3	US Ouangani (R3) (Mayotte)
25.	(Mayotte) Miracle du Sud (R3)	2–0	VSS Hagnoudrou (R3) (Mayotte)

Note: Mayotte League structure (no promotion to French League structure):

- Régionale 1 (R1)
- Régionale 2 (R2)
- Régionale 3 (R3)
- Régionale 4 (R4)

=== Second round (Mayotte) ===
These matches were played on 24 and 25 October 2020.

Second round results: Mayotte
Tie no	Home team (tier)	Score	Away team (tier)
1.	(Mayotte) VCO Vahibé (R3)	1–2	N'Drema Club (R3) (Mayotte)
2.	(Mayotte) FC Chiconi (R3)	0–1	Espoir Club de Longoni (R4) (Mayotte)
3.	(Mayotte) AOE Chiconi (R3)	0–6	AS Rosador (R1) (Mayotte)
4.	(Mayotte) AS Neige (R2)	1–0 (a.e.t.)	Miracle du Sud (R3) (Mayotte)
5.	(Mayotte) ACSJ M'Liha (R4)	0–1	FC Mtsapéré (R1) (Mayotte)
6.	Enfants de Mayotte (R2)	1–3	FC Dembeni (R2) (Mayotte)
7.	(Mayotte) Olympique de Miréréni (R2)	2–1 (a.e.t.)	Enfant du Port (R3) (Mayotte)

Note: Mayotte League structure (no promotion to French League structure):

- Régionale 1 (R1)
- Régionale 2 (R2)
- Régionale 3 (R3)
- Régionale 4 (R4)

=== Third round (Mayotte) ===
These matches were played on 31 October 2020.

Third round results: Mayotte
Tie no	Home team (tier)	Score	Away team (tier)
1.	(Mayotte) AS Sada (R1)	4–4 (3–5 p)	FC Majicavo (R2) (Mayotte)
2.	(Mayotte) US Ouangani (R3)	2–0	US Kavani (R3) (Mayotte)
3.	(Mayotte) USJ Tsararano (R4)	2–4 (a.e.t.)	Olympique de Miréréni (R2) (Mayotte)
4.	(Mayotte) FC Shingabwé (R4)	2–4	Tchanga SC (R1) (Mayotte)
5.	(Mayotte) USCJ Koungou (R1)	0–1	AS Neige (R2) (Mayotte)
6.	(Mayotte) Pamandzi SC (R3)	5–2 (a.e.t.)	Diables Noirs (R1) (Mayotte)
7.	(Mayotte) FC Dembeni (R2)	1–0 (a.e.t.)	Espérance d'Iloni (R3) (Mayotte)
8.	(Mayotte) Choungui FC (R3)	1–1 (3–4 p)	AS Bandraboua (R1) (Mayotte)
9.	(Mayotte) USC Anteou Poroani (R1)	1–1 (4–3 p)	AS Jumeaux de M'zouazia (R1) (Mayotte)
10.	(Mayotte) FC Mtsapéré (R1)	2–1 (a.e.t.)	UCS Sada (R1) (Mayotte)
11.	(Mayotte) Foudre 2000 (R2)	0–1	N'Drema Club (R3) (Mayotte)
12.	(Mayotte) ASC Wahadi (R3)	0–1	USC Labattoir (R3) (Mayotte)
13.	(Mayotte) AJ Mtsahara (R3)	2–1	ASJ Moinatrindri (R1) (Mayotte)
14.	(Mayotte) Racine du Nord (R3)	1–0	FC Mtsankandro (R4) (Mayotte)
15.	(Mayotte) Espoir Club de Longoni (R4)	1–2	AS Rosador (R1) (Mayotte)
16.	(Mayotte) Feu du Centre (R4)	0–1 (a.e.t.)	ASC Kaweni (R1) (Mayotte)

Note: Mayotte League structure (no promotion to French League structure):

- Régionale 1 (R1)
- Régionale 2 (R2)
- Régionale 3 (R3)
- Régionale 4 (R4)

=== Fourth round (Mayotte) ===
These matches were played on 7 November 2020.

Fourth round results: Mayotte
Tie no	Home team (tier)	Score	Away team (tier)
1.	(Mayotte) AJ Mtsahara (R3)	2–1	AS Bandraboua (R1) (Mayotte)
2.	(Mayotte) Olympique de Miréréni (R2)	1–2	FC Mtsapéré (R1) (Mayotte)
3.	(Mayotte) N'Drema Club (R3)	1–1 (3–4 p)	USC Anteou Poroani (R1) (Mayotte)
4.	(Mayotte) USC Labattoir (R3)	2–0	AS Rosador (R1) (Mayotte)
5.	(Mayotte) US Ouangani (R3)	2–0	Tchanga SC (R1) (Mayotte)
6.	(Mayotte) FC Majicavo (R2)	1–2	FC Dembeni (R2) (Mayotte)
7.	(Mayotte) AS Neige (R2)	0–0 (2–4 p)	Racine du Nord (R3) (Mayotte)
8.	(Mayotte) Pamandzi SC (R3)	0–0 (5–4 p)	ASC Kaweni (R1) (Mayotte)

Note: Mayotte League structure (no promotion to French League structure):

- Régionale 1 (R1)
- Régionale 2 (R2)
- Régionale 3 (R3)
- Régionale 4 (R4)

=== Fifth round (Mayotte) ===
These matches were played on 11 November 2020.

Fifth round results: Mayotte
Tie no	Home team (tier)	Score	Away team (tier)
1.	(Mayotte) FC Dembeni (R2)	2–4	US Ouangani (R3) (Mayotte)
2.	(Mayotte) USC Labattoir (R3)	1–3 (a.e.t.)	USC Anteou Poroani (R1) (Mayotte)
3.	(Mayotte) AJ Mtsahara (R3)	0–2	Pamandzi SC (R3) (Mayotte)
4.	(Mayotte) Racine du Nord (R3)	1–7	FC Mtsapéré (R1) (Mayotte)

Note: Mayotte League structure (no promotion to French League structure):

- Régionale 1 (R1)
- Régionale 2 (R2)
- Régionale 3 (R3)
- Régionale 4 (R4)

=== Sixth round (Mayotte) ===
These matches were played on 15 November 2020.

Sixth round results: Mayotte
Tie no	Home team (tier)	Score	Away team (tier)
1.	(Mayotte) US Ouangani (R3)	0–1	FC Mtsapéré (R1) (Mayotte)
2.	(Mayotte) Pamandzi SC (R3)	1–0	USC Anteou Poroani (R1) (Mayotte)

Note: Mayotte League structure (no promotion to French League structure):

- Régionale 1 (R1)
- Régionale 2 (R2)
- Régionale 3 (R3)
- Régionale 4 (R4)

== Réunion ==
Due to the COVID-19 pandemic in Réunion, the normal qualifying competition could not take place. In June 2020 the Ligue Réunionnaise de Football announced that a smaller qualifying competition, restricted to 16 teams, would take place over three rounds, with the teams involved being the 14 from Régional 1 and the 2 relegated to Régional 2 at the end of last season. On 27 July, due to the ongoing pandemic situation, the start date of qualifying was moved to 2 September 2020. The draw for the first set of fixtures, analogous to the fourth round of qualifying, was finally made on 16 October 2020, with matches to take place over the weekend of 31 October and 1 November 2020.

=== Fourth round (Réunion) ===
These matches were played on 31 October and 1 November 2020

Fourth round results: Réunion
Tie no	Home team (tier)	Score	Away team (tier)
1.	(Réunion) AS Bretagne (R1)	1–4	JS Saint-Pierroise (R1) (Réunion)
2.	(Réunion) AF Saint-Louisien (R1)	1–1 (4–3 p)	Saint-Denis FC (R1) (Réunion)
3.	(Réunion) AS Saint-Louisienne (R2)	1–2	La Tamponnaise (R1) (Réunion)
4.	(Réunion) Saint-Pauloise FC (R1)	0–2	Trois Bassins FC (R1) (Réunion)
5.	(Réunion) AS Sainte-Suzanne (R2)	2–0	SS Jeanne d'Arc (R1) (Réunion)
6.	(Réunion) AS Marsouins (R1)	0–0 (3–4 p)	AS Capricorne (R1) (Réunion)
7.	(Réunion) AS Excelsior (R1)	2–1	ACF Piton Saint-Leu (R1) (Réunion)
8.	(Réunion) US Sainte-Marienne (R1)	4–0 (Note: Tie won by means of forfeit.)	Saint Denis EDFA (R1) (Réunion)

Note: Reúnion League structure (no promotion to French League structure):

- Régionale 1 (R1)
- Régionale 2 (R2)

=== Fifth round (Réunion) ===
These matches were played on 7 and 8 November 2020

Fifth round results: Réunion
Tie no	Home team (tier)	Score	Away team (tier)
1.	(Réunion) AF Saint-Louisien (R1)	2–0	La Tamponnaise (R1) (Réunion)
2.	(Réunion) Trois Bassins FC (R1)	1–2	JS Saint-Pierroise (R1) (Réunion)
3.	(Réunion) AS Sainte-Suzanne (R2)	2–0	AS Excelsior (R1) (Réunion)
4.	(Réunion) AS Capricorne (R1)	0–0 (3–5 p)	US Sainte-Marienne (R1) (Réunion)

Note: Reúnion League structure (no promotion to French League structure):

- Régionale 1 (R1)
- Régionale 2 (R2)

=== Sixth round (Réunion) ===
These matches were played on 14 and 15 November 2020

Sixth round results: Réunion
Tie no	Home team (tier)	Score	Away team (tier)
1.	(Réunion) JS Saint-Pierroise (R1)	3–0	AF Saint-Louisien (R1) (Réunion)
2.	(Réunion) US Sainte-Marienne (R1)	2–1	AS Sainte-Suzanne (R2) (Réunion)

Note: Reúnion League structure (no promotion to French League structure):

- Régionale 1 (R1)
- Régionale 2 (R2)

== French Guiana ==
On 13 July 2020, the Ligue Football Guyane proposed an alternative calendar due to the ongoing COVID situation. This proposal would see the competition start with the third round on 31 October 2020.

The draw was made for the third round on 28 August 2020, and was published on 7 September 2020. A total of 32 teams entered the competition, and all entered at this third round stage. The draw for the fourth round was made on 1 November 2020. The draw for the fifth round was made on 8 November 2020.

=== Third round (French Guiana) ===
These matches were played between 24 and 31 October 2020.

Third round results: French Guiana
Tie no	Home team (tier)	Score	Away team (tier)
1.	(French Guiana) US de Matoury (R1)	1–2	ASE Matoury (R1) (French Guiana)
2.	(French Guiana) ASC Agouado (R1)	2–1	ASC Ouest (R1) (French Guiana)
3.	(French Guiana) ASCS Maripasoula (none)	0–2	Le Geldar De Kourou (R1) (French Guiana)
4.	(French Guiana) FC Family (none)	4–2	Pac du Maroni (R2) (French Guiana)
5.	(French Guiana) ASC Kawina (none)	2–2 (2–4 p)	ASC Rémire (R1) (French Guiana)
6.	(French Guiana) SC Kouroucien (R1)	2–1	ASC Karib (R2) (French Guiana)
7.	(French Guiana) AJ Saint-Georges (R1)	5–3	Dynamo De Soula (R2) (French Guiana)
8.	(French Guiana) Loyola OC (R1)	0–3	ASC Arc-en-Ciel (R1) (French Guiana)
9.	(French Guiana) ASL Sport Guyanais (R2)	0–1	CSC Cayenne (R1) (French Guiana)
10.	(French Guiana) AJ Balata Abriba (R2)	0–1	US Macouria (R2) (French Guiana)
11.	(French Guiana) Kourou FC (R2)	0–0 (4–3 p)	Olympique Cayenne (R1) (French Guiana)
12.	(French Guiana) Yana Sport Elite Academy (R2)	2–2 (5–3 p)	US Saint-Élie (R2) (French Guiana)
13.	(French Guiana) ASC Armire (R2)	2–0	USC Montsinéry-Tonnegrande (R2) (French Guiana)
14.	(French Guiana) USC De Roura (R2)	0–3	FC Oyapock (R1) (French Guiana)
15.	(French Guiana) EF Iracoubo (R2)	0–1	US Sinnamary (R1) (French Guiana)
16.	(French Guiana) Cosma Foot (R2)	2–3	ASU Grand Santi (R1) (French Guiana)

Note: French Guiana League structure (no promotion to French League structure):

- Régional 1 (R1)
- Régional 2 (R2)

=== Fourth round (French Guiana) ===
These matches were played on 6, 7 and 8 November 2020.

Fourth round results: French Guiana
Tie no	Home team (tier)	Score	Away team (tier)
1.	(French Guiana) FC Oyapock (R1)	5–0	Yana Sport Elite Academy (R2) (French Guiana)
2.	(French Guiana) ASE Matoury (R1)	4–1	ASC Rémire (R1) (French Guiana)
3.	(French Guiana) ASC Arc-en-Ciel (R1)	4–2	FC Family (none) (French Guiana)
4.	(French Guiana) Le Geldar De Kourou (R1)	6–0	US Macouria (R2) (French Guiana)
5.	(French Guiana) CSC Cayenne (R1)	3–3 (7–6 p)	AJ Saint-Georges (R1) (French Guiana)
6.	(French Guiana) US Sinnamary (R1)	2–0	SC Kouroucien (R1) (French Guiana)
7.	(French Guiana) Kourou FC (R2)	0–2	ASC Armire (R2) (French Guiana)
8.	(French Guiana) ASU Grand Santi (R1)	1–0	ASC Agouado (R1) (French Guiana)

Note: French Guiana League structure (no promotion to French League structure):

- Régional 1 (R1)
- Régional 2 (R2)

=== Fifth round (French Guiana) ===
These matches were played on 14 November 2020.

Fifth round results: French Guiana
Tie no	Home team (tier)	Score	Away team (tier)
1.	(French Guiana) Le Geldar De Kourou (R1)	2–1	ASE Matoury (R1) (French Guiana)
2.	(French Guiana) ASC Arc-en-Ciel (R1)	2–3	US Sinnamary (R1) (French Guiana)
3.	(French Guiana) ASC Armire (R2)	0–3	ASU Grand Santi (R1) (French Guiana)
4.	(French Guiana) CSC Cayenne (R1)	1–2	FC Oyapock (R1) (French Guiana)

Note: French Guiana League structure (no promotion to French League structure):

- Régional 1 (R1)
- Régional 2 (R2)

=== Sixth round (French Guiana) ===
These matches were played on 21 November 2020.

Sixth round results: French Guiana
Tie no	Home team (tier)	Score	Away team (tier)
1.	(French Guiana) ASU Grand Santi (R1)	4–0	Le Geldar De Kourou (R1) (French Guiana)
2.	(French Guiana) US Sinnamary (R1)	3–1	FC Oyapock (R1) (French Guiana)

Note: French Guiana League structure (no promotion to French League structure):

- Régional 1 (R1)
- Régional 2 (R2)

== Martinique ==
A total of 52 teams from the three Régionale divisions entered the competition. Ten teams (seven from Régionale 1 and three from Régionale 2) were awarded a bye in the opening round, leaving 22 ties involving 44 teams.

=== Second round (Martinique) ===
This season, the preliminary rounds start with the second round, due to the number of clubs entered. These matches were played on 21, 22, 26 and 29 August 2020.

Second round results: Martinique
Tie no	Home team (tier)	Score	Away team (tier)
1.	(Martinique) Anses Arlets FC (R2)	1–4	AS Eclair Rivière-Salée (R2) (Martinique)
2.	(Martinique) ASC Eudorçait-Fourniols (R3)	0–13	RC Lorrain (R1) (Martinique)
3.	(Martinique) Gri-Gri Pilotin FC (R3)	0–2	CS Case-Pilote (R2) (Martinique)
4.	(Martinique) Stade Spiritain (R2)	3–0	ASC Môn Pito (R3) (Martinique)
5.	(Martinique) US Marinoise (R2)	1–1 (2–4 p)	US Diamantinoise (R2) (Martinique)
6.	(Martinique) Océanic Club Le Lorrain (R3)	0–7	New Star Ducos (R1) (Martinique)
7.	(Martinique) Eveil les Trois-Îlets (R2)	6–1	Réal Tartane (R2) (Martinique)
8.	(Martinique) ASC Hirondelle (R3)	0–4	Assaut de Saint-Pierre (R1) (Martinique)
9.	(Martinique) AS Étoile Basse-Pointe (R3)	2–4	US Riveraine (R2) (Martinique)
10.	(Martinique) CSC Carbet (R3)	0–2	CO Dillon-Sainte Thérèse (R3) (Martinique)
11.	(Martinique) FEP Monésie (R2)	3–0	L'Intrépide Club (R2) (Martinique)
12.	(Martinique) SC Lamentin (R3)	2–2 (2–3 p)	Club Péléen (R2) (Martinique)
13.	(Martinique) AS Excelsior (R2)	2–0	Solidarite de Lestrade (R3) (Martinique)
14.	(Martinique) US Robert (R1)	6–0	Santana Club (R2) (Martinique)
15.	(Martinique) Golden Star (R1)	4–1	AC Vert-Pré (R2) (Martinique)
16.	(Martinique) AS Silver Star (R2)	2–3	Good Luck (R2) (Martinique)
17.	(Martinique) CS Vauclinois (R2)	3–1	Etendard Bellefontaine (R2) (Martinique)
18.	(Martinique) Olympique Le Marin (R1)	1–0	Emulation (R2) (Martinique)
19.	(Martinique) UJ Monnérot (R1)	3–1	Réveil Sportif (R2) (Martinique)
20.	(Martinique) UJ Redoute (R3)	0–4	RC Rivière-Pilote (R1) (Martinique)
21.	(Martinique) CS Bélimois (R3)	0–6	Étincelle Macouba (R2) (Martinique)
22.	(Martinique) AS Morne-des-Esses (R2)	2–1	CO Trenelle (R1) (Martinique)

Note: Martinique League structure (no promotion to French League structure):

- Régionale 1 (R1)
- Régionale 2 (R2)
- Régionale 3 (R3)

=== Third round (Martinique) ===
These matches were played on 28 and 29 August and 1 and 9 September 2020.

Third round results: Martinique
Tie no	Home team (tier)	Score	Away team (tier)
1.	(Martinique) New Star Ducos (R1)	3–0	Good Luck (R2) (Martinique)
2.	(Martinique) Club Franciscain (R1)	3–0	CS Vauclinois (R2) (Martinique)
3.	(Martinique) CO Dillon-Sainte Thérèse (R3)	0–2	Eveil les Trois-Îlets (R2) (Martinique)
4.	(Martinique) AS Eclair Rivière-Salée (R2)	4–1	AS Morne-des-Esses (R2) (Martinique)
5.	(Martinique) US Diamantinoise (R2)	2–2 (5–4 p)	Olympique Le Marin (R1) (Martinique)
6.	(Martinique) Aiglon du Lamentin (R1)	3–2	AS New Club (R2) (Martinique)
7.	(Martinique) RC Lorrain (R1)	2–0	RC Rivière-Pilote (R1) (Martinique)
8.	(Martinique) Club Péléen (R2)	3–0	AS Excelsior (R2) (Martinique)
9.	(Martinique) CS Case-Pilote (R2)	2–1	La Gauloise de Trinité (R2) (Martinique)
10.	(Martinique) US Riveraine (R2)	1–1 (4–2 p)	JS Eucalyptus (R2) (Martinique)
11.	(Martinique) Étincelle Macouba (R2)	0–3	Assaut de Saint-Pierre (R1) (Martinique)
12.	(Martinique) RC Saint-Joseph (R1)	0–2	Golden Lion FC (R1) (Martinique)
13.	(Martinique) FEP Monésie (R2)	0–2	Club Colonial (R1) (Martinique)
14.	(Martinique) UJ Monnérot (R1)	3–1	Stade Spiritain (R2) (Martinique)
15.	(Martinique) AS Samaritaine (R1)	1–1 (5–3 p)	US Robert (R1) (Martinique)
16.	(Martinique) Golden Star (R1)	1–1 (1–3 p)	Essor-Préchotain (R1) (Martinique)

Note: Martinique League structure (no promotion to French League structure):

- Régionale 1 (R1)
- Régionale 2 (R2)
- Régionale 3 (R3)

=== Fourth round (Martinique) ===
These matches were played on 11 and 12 September 2020.

Fourth round results: Martinique
Tie no	Home team (tier)	Score	Away team (tier)
1.	(Martinique) Club Colonial (R1)	0–1	US Riveraine (R2) (Martinique)
2.	(Martinique) Eveil les Trois-Îlets (R2)	1–5	Aiglon du Lamentin (R1) (Martinique)
3.	(Martinique) Assaut de Saint-Pierre (R1)	3–0	New Star Ducos (R1) (Martinique)
4.	(Martinique) UJ Monnérot (R1)	6–3	Club Péléen (R2) (Martinique)
5.	(Martinique) Golden Lion FC (R1)	8–1	CS Case-Pilote (R2) (Martinique)
6.	(Martinique) Essor-Préchotain (R1)	4–2	AS Eclair Rivière-Salée (R2) (Martinique)
7.	(Martinique) AS Samaritaine (R1)	6–1	RC Lorrain (R1) (Martinique)
8.	(Martinique) Club Franciscain (R1)	7–0	US Diamantinoise (R2) (Martinique)

Note: Martinique League structure (no promotion to French League structure):

- Régionale 1 (R1)
- Régionale 2 (R2)
- Régionale 3 (R3)

=== Fifth round (Martinique) ===
These matches were played on 13 and 14 October 2020.

Fifth round results: Martinique
Tie no	Home team (tier)	Score	Away team (tier)
1.	(Martinique) Essor-Préchotain (R1)	0–0 (1–4 p)	Golden Lion FC (R1) (Martinique)
2.	(Martinique) Club Franciscain (R1)	8–2	UJ Monnérot (R1) (Martinique)
3.	(Martinique) Aiglon du Lamentin (R1)	1–2	AS Samaritaine (R1) (Martinique)
4.	(Martinique) US Riveraine (R2)	2–1	Assaut de Saint-Pierre (R1) (Martinique)

Note: Martinique League structure (no promotion to French League structure):

- Régionale 1 (R1)
- Régionale 2 (R2)
- Régionale 3 (R3)

=== Sixth round (Martinique) ===
These matches were played on 24 October 2020.

Sixth round results: Martinique
Tie no	Home team (tier)	Score	Away team (tier)
1.	(Martinique) US Riveraine (R2)	2–4	Club Franciscain (R1) (Martinique)
2.	(Martinique) AS Samaritaine (R1)	2–1	Golden Lion FC (R1) (Martinique)

Note: Martinique League structure (no promotion to French League structure):

- Régionale 1 (R1)
- Régionale 2 (R2)
- Régionale 3 (R3)

== Guadeloupe ==
The draw for the opening round was made on 21 August 2020, with a total of 48 clubs participating. To align with the other qualifying competitions, this competition starts at the second round. Sixteen clubs from the Régional 1 division were exempted to the third round.

=== Second round (Guadeloupe) ===
This season, the preliminary rounds start with the second round, due to the number of clubs entering. These matches were played between 21 August and 9 September 2020.

Second round results: Guadeloupe
Tie no	Home team (tier)	Score	Away team (tier)
1.	(Guadeloupe) AS Juventa (R2)	0–2	USC de Bananier (R2) (Guadeloupe)
2.	(Guadeloupe) Association Juvenis (R2)	3–2	Résistance Bouillante (R3) (Guadeloupe)
3.	(Guadeloupe) CS Bouillantais (R2)	2–1	Colonial Club Baillif (R3) (Guadeloupe)
4.	(Guadeloupe) JS Abymienne (R2)	2–1	AO Gourbeyrienne (R2) (Guadeloupe)
5.	(Guadeloupe) AS Nenuphars (R2)	0–2	ASC Madiana (R2) (Guadeloupe)
6.	(Guadeloupe) Union des Artistes de Raizet (R2)	5–0	FC Saint-François (R3) (Guadeloupe)
7.	(Guadeloupe) US Grand-Bourg (R2)	1–5	L'Etoile de Morne-à-l'Eau (R2) (Guadeloupe)
8.	(Guadeloupe) Cactus Sainte-Anne (R3)	0–3 (Note: Tie won by means of forfeit.)	Mondial Club (R2) (Guadeloupe)
9.	(Guadeloupe) CS St François (R1)	2–2 (2–4 p)	SC Baie-Mahault (R2) (Guadeloupe)
10.	(Guadeloupe) CA Marquisat (R2)	4–3	US Cambrefort (R2) (Guadeloupe)
11.	(Guadeloupe) ASC La Frégate (R2)	2–0	AS Dragon (R2) (Guadeloupe)
12.	(Guadeloupe) Cygne Noir (R2)	1–0	US Ansoise (R3) (Guadeloupe)
13.	(Guadeloupe) Étoile Filante (R3)	0–6	AS Le Moule (R2) (Guadeloupe)
14.	(Guadeloupe) L'Éclair de Petit-Bourg (R2)	1–2	CS Capesterre-Belle-Eau (R2) (Guadeloupe)
15.	(Guadeloupe) AJ Saint-Félix (R2)	0–1	Olympique Saint-Claudien (R2) (Guadeloupe)
16.	(Guadeloupe) ASC Siroco Les Abymes (R2)	– (Note: Match abandoned with the scoreline 5–0. JSC Marie Galante penalised. ASC Siroco Les Abymes qualify.)	JSC Marie Galante (R3) (Guadeloupe)

Note: Guadeloupe League structure (no promotion to French League structure):

- Ligue Régionale 1 (R1)
- Ligue Régionale 2 (R2)
- Ligue Régionale 3 (R3)

=== Third round (Guadeloupe) ===
These matches were played between 9 and 13 September 2020.

Third round results: Guadeloupe
Tie no	Home team (tier)	Score	Away team (tier)
1.	(Guadeloupe) Red Star (R1)	0–1	Jeunesse Evolution (R1) (Guadeloupe)
2.	(Guadeloupe) Phare du Canal (R1)	1–0	Association Juvenis (R2) (Guadeloupe)
3.	(Guadeloupe) JS Abymienne (R2)	1–11	Solidarité-Scolaire (R1) (Guadeloupe)
4.	(Guadeloupe) ASC Madiana (R2)	0–2	USC de Bananier (R2) (Guadeloupe)
5.	(Guadeloupe) CS Moulien' (R1)	4–0	CS Bouillantais (R2) (Guadeloupe)
6.	(Guadeloupe) Union des Artistes de Raizet (R2)	0–3	JS Vieux-Habitants (R1) (Guadeloupe)
7.	(Guadeloupe) Amical Club Marie Galante (R1)	1–1 (5–6 p)	ASG Juventus de Sainte-Anne (R1) (Guadeloupe)
8.	(Guadeloupe) Mondial Club (R2)	0–1	L'Etoile de Morne-à-l'Eau (R2) (Guadeloupe)
9.	(Guadeloupe) SC Baie-Mahault (R2)	1–3	Dynamo Le Moule (R1) (Guadeloupe)
10.	(Guadeloupe) Olympique Saint-Claudien (R2)	1–5	Unité Sainte-Rosienne (R1) (Guadeloupe)
11.	(Guadeloupe) Racing Club de Basse-Terre (R1)	2–0	Cygne Noir (R2) (Guadeloupe)
12.	(Guadeloupe) Arsenal Club (R1)	0–0 (1–4 p)	Stade Lamentinois (R1) (Guadeloupe)
13.	(Guadeloupe) US Baie-Mahault (R1)	1–2	AS Le Gosier (R1) (Guadeloupe)
14.	(Guadeloupe) CS Capesterre-Belle-Eau (R2)	1–4	La Gauloise de Basse-Terre (R1) (Guadeloupe)
15.	(Guadeloupe) ASC Siroco Les Abymes (R2)	6–2	ASC La Frégate (R2) (Guadeloupe)
16.	(Guadeloupe) AS Le Moule (R2)	2–3	CA Marquisat (R2) (Guadeloupe)

Note: Guadeloupe League structure (no promotion to French League structure):

- Ligue Régionale 1 (R1)
- Ligue Régionale 2 (R2)
- Ligue Régionale 3 (R3)

=== Fourth round (Guadeloupe) ===
These matches were played on 2 and 3 October 2020.

Fourth round results: Guadeloupe
Tie no	Home team (tier)	Score	Away team (tier)
1.	(Guadeloupe) Jeunesse Evolution (R1)	0–1	Phare du Canal (R1) (Guadeloupe)
2.	(Guadeloupe) USC de Bananier (R2)	3–0	JS Vieux-Habitants (R1) (Guadeloupe)
3.	(Guadeloupe) ASG Juventus de Sainte-Anne (R1)	0–5	CS Moulien (R1) (Guadeloupe)
4.	(Guadeloupe) L'Etoile de Morne-à-l'Eau (R2)	1–4	Solidarité-Scolaire (R1) (Guadeloupe)
5.	(Guadeloupe) Unité Sainte-Rosienne (R1)	1–1 (4–2 p)	La Gauloise de Basse-Terre (R1) (Guadeloupe)
6.	(Guadeloupe) Stade Lamentinois (R1)	1–1 (3–1 p)	ASC Siroco Les Abymes (R2) (Guadeloupe)
7.	(Guadeloupe) Dynamo Le Moule (R1)	0–1	Racing Club de Basse-Terre (R1) (Guadeloupe)
8.	(Guadeloupe) CA Marquisat (R2)	2–9	AS Le Gosier (R1) (Guadeloupe)

Note: Guadeloupe League structure (no promotion to French League structure):

- Ligue Régionale 1 (R1)
- Ligue Régionale 2 (R2)
- Ligue Régionale 3 (R3)

=== Fifth round (Guadeloupe) ===
These matches were played on 13 and 14 October 2020.

Fifth round results: Guadeloupe
Tie no	Home team (tier)	Score	Away team (tier)
1.	(Guadeloupe) Phare du Canal (R1)	2–0	USC de Bananier (R2) (Guadeloupe)
2.	(Guadeloupe) Solidarité-Scolaire (R1)	1–2	CS Moulien (R1) (Guadeloupe)
3.	(Guadeloupe) AS Le Gosier (R1)	3–4	Unité Sainte-Rosienne (R1) (Guadeloupe)
4.	(Guadeloupe) Racing Club de Basse-Terre (R1)	2–2 (3–4 p)	Stade Lamentinois (R1) (Guadeloupe)

Note: Guadeloupe League structure (no promotion to French League structure):

- Ligue Régionale 1 (R1)
- Ligue Régionale 2 (R2)
- Ligue Régionale 3 (R3)

=== Sixth round (Guadeloupe) ===
These matches were played on 27 and 28 October 2020.

Sixth round results: Guadeloupe
Tie no	Home team (tier)	Score	Away team (tier)
1.	(Guadeloupe) CS Moulien (R1)	0–1	Phare du Canal (R1) (Guadeloupe)
2.	(Guadeloupe) Stade Lamentinois (R1)	0–1	Unité Sainte-Rosienne (R1) (Guadeloupe)

Note: Guadeloupe League structure (no promotion to French League structure):

- Ligue Régionale 1 (R1)
- Ligue Régionale 2 (R2)
- Ligue Régionale 3 (R3)

== Saint Pierre and Miquelon ==
The Overseas Collectivity of Saint Pierre and Miquelon has only three teams, so there was just one match in each of two rounds, with one team receiving a bye to the second round. The winner gains entry to the third round draw of the Pays de la Loire region.

On 8 September 2020, the prefecture of Saint-Pierre-et-Miquelon banned the travel of A.S. Saint Pierraise to mainland France due to the ongoing COVID-19 situation. The side had been due to depart on 12 September, travelling via Montreal and Paris.

=== First round (Saint Pierre and Miquelon) ===
The match was played on 18 July 2020.

First round results: Saint Pierre and Miquelon
Tie no	Home team (tier)	Score	Away team (tier)
1.	(Saint Pierre and Miquelon) A.S. Îlienne Amateur	1–1 (2–3 p)	A.S. Miquelonnaise (Saint Pierre and Miquelon)

=== Second round (Saint Pierre and Miquelon) ===
The match was played on 25 July 2020.

Second round results: Saint Pierre and Miquelon
Tie no	Home team (tier)	Score	Away team (tier)
1.	(Saint Pierre and Miquelon) A.S. Saint Pierraise	0–0 (4–2 p)	A.S. Miquelonnaise (Saint Pierre and Miquelon)

== See also ==
- Overseas France teams in the main competition of the Coupe de France
