= List of football clubs in Mayotte =

The following is an incomplete list of association football clubs based on the island of Mayotte.

== A ==
- AS Neige de Malamani
- AS Sada
- ASC Abeilles
- ASC Kawéni

== F ==
- FC Labattoir
- FC Mtsapéré
- FCO de Tsingoni
- Foudre 2000 de Dzoumogné

== J ==
- AS Jumeaux de Mzouazia

== M ==
- Miracle du Sud (Bouéni)

== R ==
- Rosador de Passamainty

== U ==
- UCS Sada
- US Ouangani
