= Régional 1 Mayotte =

Association football league in Mayotte, France

Régional 1
- Organising body: Ligue mahoraise de football (LMF)
- Founded: 1992; 34 years ago
- Country: France (12 teams)
- Number of clubs: 12
- Level on pyramid: 6
- Relegation to: Régional 2
- Domestic cup(s): Coupe de France; Trophée des Champions
- Current champions: AS Rosador (11th title) (2023)
- Most championships: AS Rosador (11 titles)

The Régional 1 Mayotte is the top division of football in Mayotte. Organized by the Ligue de Football de Mayotte, the league was founded in 1992.

== 2018–19 clubs ==
- AS Jumeaux de M'zouazia (Mzouazia)
- AS Rosador (Passamainty)
- AS Sada
- ASC Abeilles (Mtsapere)
- ASC Kawéni (Mamoudzou)
- Diables Noirs (Combani)
- Etincelles (Hamjago)
- FC Koropa
- FC Mtsapéré
- FC Sohoa
- Foudre 2000 de Dzoumogné
- Tchanga SC (Mtsangamoudji)
- UCS Sada

== Previous winners ==
- 1982–91 : not known
- 1992 : AS Sada
- 1993 : AS Rosador (Passamainty)
- 1994 : AS Rosador (Passamainty)
- 1995 : AS Rosador (Passamainty)
- 1996 : AS Sada
- 1997 : AS Rosador (Passamainty)
- 1998 : AS Sada
- 1999 : AS Rosador (Passamainty)
- 2000 : AS Rosador (Passamainty)
- 2001 : AS Rosador (Passamainty)
- 2002 : FC Kani-Bé
- 2003 : FC Kani-Bé
- 2004 : AS Sada
- 2005 : FC Mtsapéré
- 2006 : FC Mtsapéré
- 2007 : FC Mtsapéré
- 2008 : FC Mtsapéré
- 2009 : AS Rosador (Passamainty)
- 2010 : FC Mtsapéré
- 2011 : ASC Abeilles
- 2012 : FC Koropa
- 2013 : FC Mtsapéré
- 2014 : FC Mtsapéré
- 2015 : FC Mtsapéré
- 2016 : Foudre 2000 de Dzoumogné
- 2017 : FC Mtsapéré
- 2018 : FC Mtsapéré
- 2019 : FC Mtsapéré
- 2020 : abandoned
- 2021 : AS Jumeaux de Mzouazia
- 2022 : FC Mtsapéré
- 2023/24 : FC Mtsapéré
- 2024 : ASC Kawéni

== Titles ==
Club	Titles
FC M'tsapéré	13
AS Rosador	8
AS Sada	4
FC Kani-Bé	2
Abeilles	1
Bandrélé FC	1
Foudre 2000	1
AS Jumeaux	1
ASC Kawéni	1
FC Koropa	1
