= Coupe de Mayotte =

Top division of the Ligue de Football de Mayotte

Coupe de Mayotte is the top division of the Ligue de Football de Mayotte and was created in 1977.

== Previous winners ==
- 197? : Etoile Polaire bt Olympic de Pamandzi
- 1980 : AS Sada 2-1 FC Mtsapéré
- 1981 : FC Mtsapéré 2-1 Avenir de Labattoir
- 1982 : not known
- 1983 : FC Mtsapéré 4-1 Olympic de Pamandzi
- 1984 : not known
- 1985 : FC Mtsapéré 3-1 Volcan
- 1986 : Miracle du Sud (Bouéni) (?)
- 1987 : FC Mtsapéré 7-3 AS Sada
- 1988 : Ouragan de Labattoir 3-1 FC Mtsapéré
- 1989 : not known
- 1990 : not known
- 1991 : FC Mtsapéré 4-3 AS Sada
- 1992 : Ouragan de Labbatoir (?)
- 1993 : FC Mtsapéré 1-0 Chembényoumba
- 1994 : AS Rosador (Passamainty)
- 1995 : FC Mtsapéré 1-0 AS Rosador (Passamainty)
- 1996 : FC Mtsapéré 2-1 AS Rosador (Passamainty)
- 1997 : Miracle du Sud (Bouéni) (?)
- 1998 : AS Rosador (Passamainty) bt FC Kani Bé
- 1999 : Jumeaux (M'zouasia)
- 2000 : FC Kani Bé bt Miracle du Sud (Bouéni)
- 2001 : final FCO (Tsingoni) vs Rosador (Passamainty)
- 2002 : Pamandzi SC 3-1 FC Mtsapéré
- 2003 : Pamandzi SC drw FCO (Tsingoni) [Pamandzi on pen]
- 2004 : Pamandzi SC bt AS Sada
- 2005/06 : Hamjago FC 3-1 Bandrélé Foot
- 2006 : UCS Sada 2-0 FCO Tsingoni
- 2007 : Etincelles d'Hamjago 1-0 FCO Tsingoni
- 2008 : FC Labattoir 2-0 FC Passamainty
- 2009 : AS Rosador (Passamainty) 0-0 FC Mtsapéré [aet, 6-5 pen]
- 2010 : US Ouangani 4-0 Diables Noirs
- 2011 : tournament abandoned
- 2012 : AS Neige (Malamani) 1-1 ASC Abeilles (Mtsapere) [aet, 4-2 pen]
- 2013 : Miracle du Sud (Bouéni) 0-0 Jumeaux (Mzouasia) [aet, 5-4 pen]
- 2014 : Jumeaux (M'zouasia) 4-1 VCO Vahibé
- 2015 : Olympique de Miréréni 0-0 FC Labattoir [aet, 5-4 pen]
- 2016 : UCS Sada 3-0 ASJ Handréma
- 2017 : FC Mtsapéré 1-0 Foudre 2000 de Dzoumogné
- 2018 : FC Labattoir 2-1 Foudre 2000 de Dzoumogné
- 2019 : FC Mtsapéré 2-0 Diables Noirs (Combani)
- 2020/21 : AS Jumeaux (Mzouasia) 3-1 ASC Abeilles (Mtsamboro)
- 2022 : not held
- 2023 : not held
- 2024 : Feu du Centre 1-1 (7–6 p) AJ Mtsahara
