= Collège de Bouéni =

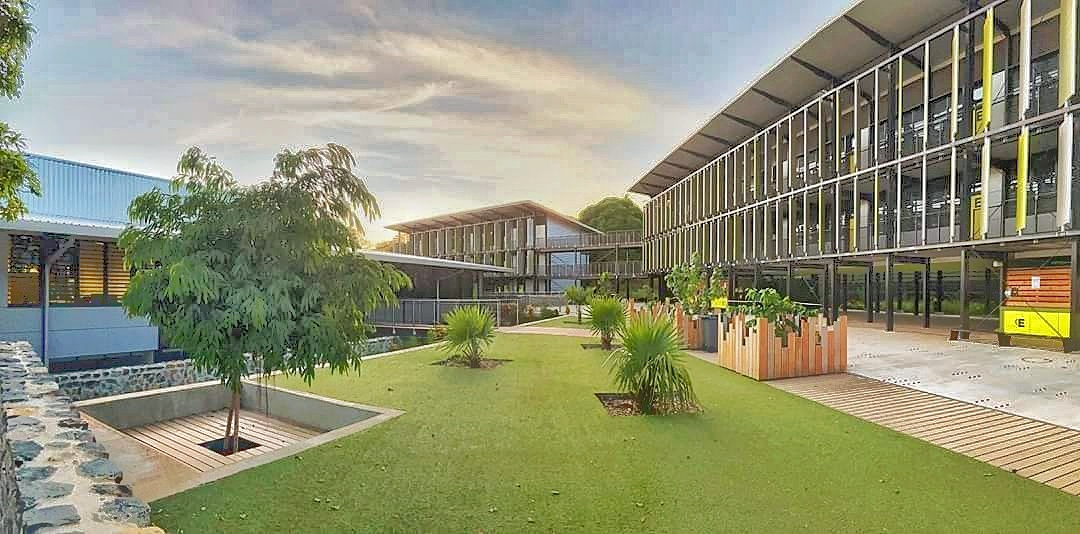
- College of Bouéni in Mayotte
- 16 Route de Tsimidouni, Bambo-Ouest. 97620 Bouéni, Mayotte, France. 12°54′24″S 45°04′43″E; Mayotte

Information
- Type: Collège
- Opened: November 18, 2019
- Principal: Jocelyne Bernard
- Website: www.clg-bouéni.fr

The College de Bouéni is a secondary school, located in the town of Bouéni in Mayotte.

== History ==
The College of Bouéni is a secondary education located in the town of Bouéni in Mayotte, it is historically known as the first college built in the town, it has been more than 20 years that the inhabitants of the town of Bouéni have been waiting for this college, it is in 2017 that the Ministry of Overseas, Ericka Bareigts, lays the first stone of the future college of Bouéni.

The college will accommodate 1028 students including 128 Section of General education and Vocational Adapted.

This establishment was built in an approach bioclimatic.

== See also ==
- Education in France
- Secondary education
