= Football in Mayotte =

The sport of association football in Mayotte is run by the Ligue mahoraise de football. The governing body administers the men's and women's national football teams, as well as the various football leagues, the highest of which is Régional 1 Mayotte.
