= Taambati Moussa =

Activist from Mayotte

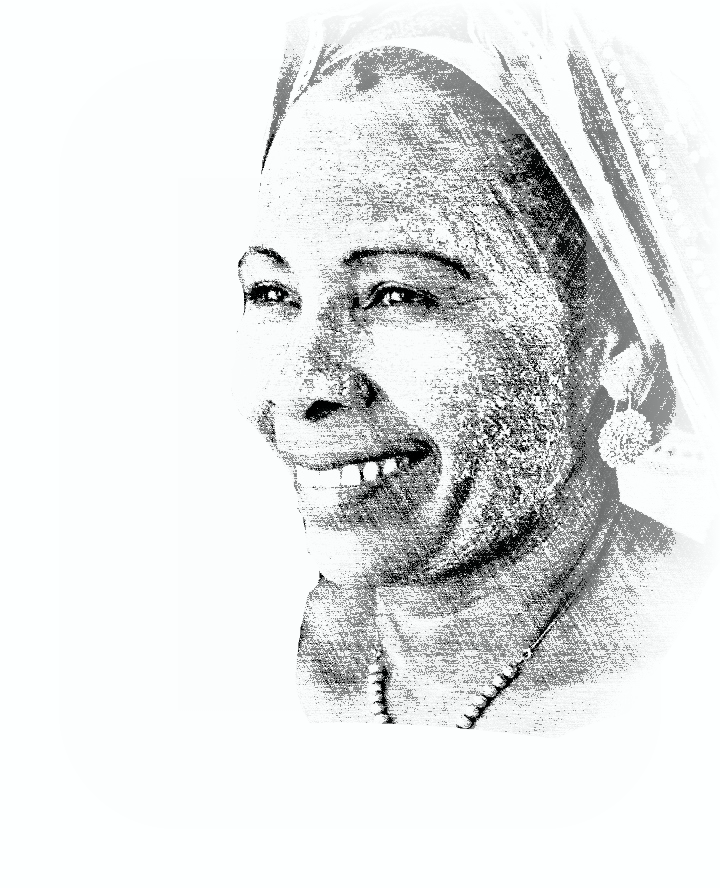
- Taambati Moussa
- Born: Moussa Harouna Taambati; Bouéni, Mayotte
- Occupation: Activist
- Awards: Ordre national du Mérite; Ordre des Arts et des Lettres

Taambati Moussa, born Abdou, whose real name is Moussa Harouna Taambati, is a Mahoraise activist.

== Career ==
Taambati has devoted her career to be one of the guardians of the cultural, traditional, and culinary heritage of Mayotte. Examples of Mahoraise heritage she seeks to protect include msindzano, ousarouma, Mahorais dishes, and djarifa fishing.

In 1985, Taambati returned to Mayotte. She noticed the lack of appreciation for the traditional arts and crafts of Mayotte, and decided to start an artists' collective to promote their sustained use. She founded the first collective in Mbouanatsa, later relocating to Bouéni. They host a stall at Mayotte's annual tourism fair in Place de la République, Mamoudzou.

With her husband, Taambati opened one of Mayotte's first bed and breakfasts in 2003. Her hope is to increase tourism to Mayotte.

In September 2015, Taambati received the Ordre national du Mérite for her 25+ years of work on promoting the culture of Mayotte.

Throughout her career, Taambati has hosted numerous workshops on Mahoraise culture. Examples of workshops include one on djarifa fishing in Bouéni and one in Bandrélé on Mahoraise hairstyles and dance.

== Awards and nominations ==
- Ordre national du Mérite
- Ordre des Arts et des Lettres
