= Plateau Polyvalent de Bouéni =

Sports building in Mayotte

Coordinates: 12.90853000°S 45.07991000°E

- Location: Bouéni
- Owner: Commune de Bouéni
- Opened: 2021

Plateau Polyvalent de Bouéni is a sports infrastructure located in Bouéni, Mayotte.

== Toponymy ==
According to Louis Aujas, around the 16th century, Sakalavian troops from the Boeny region of Madagascar, led by Diva Mamé, dropped anchor in a bay to the south and created the village, naming it and the bay "Bouéni" in memory of their region of origin.
