= Mayotte women's national football team =

Mayotte
- Nickname(s): Seahorses
- Association: Ligue de Football de Mayotte (LFM)
- Confederation: CAF (Africa)
- Sub-confederation: UFFOI (Indian Ocean Islands)
- Home stadium: Complexe de Kawani, Mamoudzou
First colours	Second colours

First international
- Mayotte 1–6 Réunion (Mliha, Mayotte; 2 May 2015)

Biggest win
- Mauritius 0–5 Mayotte (Quatre Bornes, Mauritius; 13 December 2018)

Biggest defeat
- Mayotte 0–8 Réunion (Mliha, Mayotte; 6 May 2015)
Medal record
Women's Football
Indian Ocean Island Games
Bronze medal – third place	2015 Réunion	Team

The Mayotte women's national football team represents the French overseas department and region of Mayotte in international football.

Mayotte is a member of neither FIFA nor CAF, so it is not eligible to enter the World Cup or the African Cup of Nations.

== Mayotte Football Achievements ==
=== Indian Ocean Island Games ===
Indian Ocean Island Games Record
Year	Round	Position	Pld	W	D*	L	GF	GA
(Réunion) 1979	Part of Comoros							
(Mauritius) 1985	Part of Comoros							
(Madagascar) 1990	Part of Comoros							
(Seychelles) 1993	Part of Comoros							
(Réunion) 1998	Part of Comoros							
(Mauritius) 2003	Part of Réunion							
(Madagascar) 2007	Did Not Enter							
(Seychelles) 2011	Did Not Enter							
(Réunion) 2015	Third Place	3rd	4	3	0	1	6	6
Total			4	3	0	1	6	6

== Fixtures and results ==
2 May 2015 Friendly	Mayotte	1–6	Réunion	Mliha, Mayotte
--:-- UTC+4				Stadium: Stade de M'liha

6 May 2015 Friendly	Mayotte	0–8	Réunion	Mliha, Mayotte
--:-- UTC+4				Stadium: Stade de M'liha

31 July 2015 Indian Ocean Island Games	Maldives	1–1 (3 – 4 p)	Mayotte	Saint-André, Réunion
				Stadium: Stade Baby-Larivière

4 August 2015 Indian Ocean Island Games	Seychelles	1–2	Mayotte	Saint-André, Réunion
				Stadium: Stade Baby-Larivière

6 August 2015 Indian Ocean Island Games	Mayotte	1–3	Réunion	Saint-André, Réunion
				Stadium: Stade Baby-Larivière

7 August 2015 Indian Ocean Island Games	Seychelles	1–2	Mayotte	Saint-Denis, Réunion
				Stadium: Stade Jean-Ivoula

13 December 2018 Friendly	Mauritius	0–5	Mayotte	Quatre Bornes, Mauritius
		Report

== Head-to-Head Records against other countries ==
As of 27 June 2018

Opponent	Games	Wins	Draws	Losses	Goals For	Goals Against	Goal Differential
Réunion	1	0	0	1	1	3	-2
Seychelles	2	2	0	0	4	2	2
Maldives	1	1	0	0	1	1	0
3 Countries	4	3	0	1	6	6	0

== Honours ==
This is a list of honours for the senior Mayotte national team

Indian Ocean Island Games

- Bronze Medal (bronze) : 2015
