= Moinatrindri =

- Village
- Location within Mayotte
- Coordinates: 12°53′59″S 45°5′52″E
- Country: France
- Overseas Territory: Mayotte
- Commune: Bouéni
- Time zone: UTC+3 (EAT)

Moinatrindri is a village in the commune of Bouéni in Mayotte.
