= Mauritius national football team results (1980–1989) =

These are a list of matches played by Mauritius from 1980 to 1989.

== Key ==
Win Draw Loss

== Matches ==
=== 1980 ===
September 14, 1980 1982 ACoN qual	Madagascar	0 — 0	Mauritius	Madagascar
		Report

September 28, 1980 1982 ACoN qual	Mauritius	1 — 1	Madagascar	Mauritius
		Report

=== 1981 ===
July 12, 1981 IOC	Kenya	2 — 1	Mauritius	Réunion
		Report

July 14, 1981 IOC	Mauritius	0 — 0	Madagascar	Réunion
		Report

July 19, 1981 IOC	Réunion	1 — 2	Mauritius	Réunion
		Report

=== 1982 ===
August 29, 1982 IOT	Mauritius	2 — 0	Zimbabwe	Réunion
		Report

September 5, 1982 IOT	Réunion	1 — 1	Mauritius	Réunion
		Report

=== 1983 ===
April 10, 1983 1984 ACoN qual	Ethiopia	1 — 0	Mauritius	Ethiopia
		Report

April 24, 1983 1984 ACoN qual	Mauritius	1 — 0 (1 — 2 p)	Ethiopia	Mauritius
		Report
	Penalties
	?		?

July 3, 1983 Friendly	Seychelles	1 — 2	Mauritius	Seychelles
		Report

July 6, 1983 Friendly	Réunion	0 — 0	Mauritius	Réunion
		Report

July 10, 1983 IOT	Mauritius	1 — 1	Madagascar	Réunion
		Report

July 13, 1983 IOT	France Amateurs	1 — 0	Mauritius	Réunion
		Report

July 16, 1983 IOT	Réunion	1 — 1	Mauritius	Réunion
		Report

=== 1984 ===
15 July 1984 1986 WC qual	Mauritius	0 — 1	Malawi	Curepipe, Mauritius
		Report	Phuka	Referee: Ali Khamis (Kenya)

July 28, 1984 1986 WC qual	Malawi	4 — 0	Mauritius	Lilongwe, Malawi
	Sinalo; Waya ?	Report		Referee: Diramba (Gabon)

September 30, 1984 1986 ACoN qual	Mauritius	0 — 0	Mozambique	Mauritius
		Report

September 16, 1984 1986 ACoN qual	Mozambique	3 — 0	Mauritius	Mozambique
		Report

=== 1985 ===
August 27, 1985 1985 IOIG	Mauritius	3 — 1	Seychelles	Mauritius
		Report

August 29, 1985 1985 IOIG	Mauritius	3 — 1	Madagascar	Mauritius
		Report

August 1985 1985 IOIG	Mauritius	4 — 4 (4 — 2 p)	Réunion	Mauritius
		Report
	Penalties
	?		?

=== 1986 ===
June 6, 1986 Friendly	Mauritius	0 — 1	Réunion	Mauritius
		Report

June 13, 1963 Friendly	Réunion	0 — 0	Mauritius	Réunion
		Report

August 31, 1986 Friendly	Seychelles	1 — 2	Mauritius	Seychelles
		Report

September 14, 1986 Friendly	Mauritius	2 — 1	Seychelles	Mauritius
		Report

=== 1987 ===
March 28, 1987 Friendly	Botswana	0 — 0	Mauritius	Botswana
		Report

April 5, 1987 Friendly	Madagascar	2 — 1	Mauritius	Madagascar
		Report

April 19, 1987 Friendly	Mauritius	2 — 1 (3 — 5 p)	Madagascar	Mauritius
		Report
	Penalties
	?		?

=== 1988 ===
October 2, 1988 1990 ACoN qual	Mauritius	3 — 0	Seychelles	Mauritius
		Report

October 16, 1988 1990 ACoN qual	Seychelles	1 — 0	Mauritius	Seychelles
		Report

=== 1989 ===
April 9, 1989 1990 ACoN qual	Mauritius	1 — 4	Zimbabwe	Mauritius
		Report

April 23, 1989 1990 ACoN qual	Zimbabwe	1 — 0	Mauritius	Zimbabwe
		Report
