= Bouéni =

Commune in Mayotte, France

- Commune
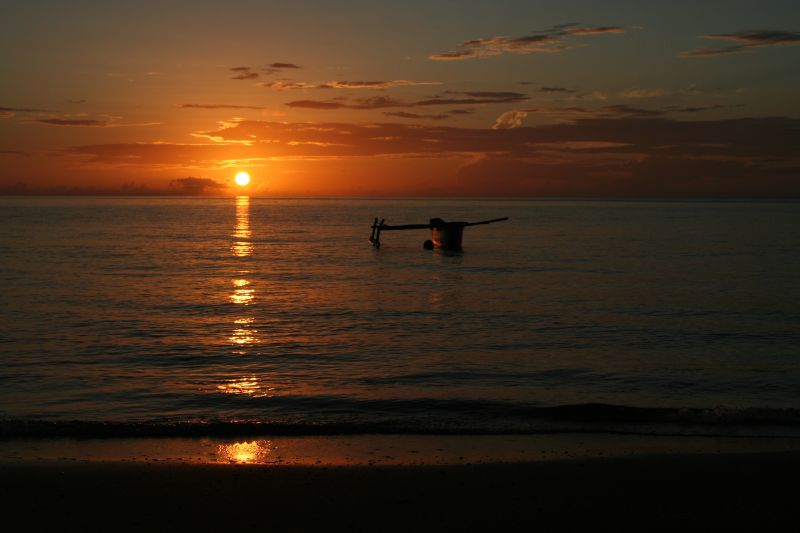

- Coat of arms

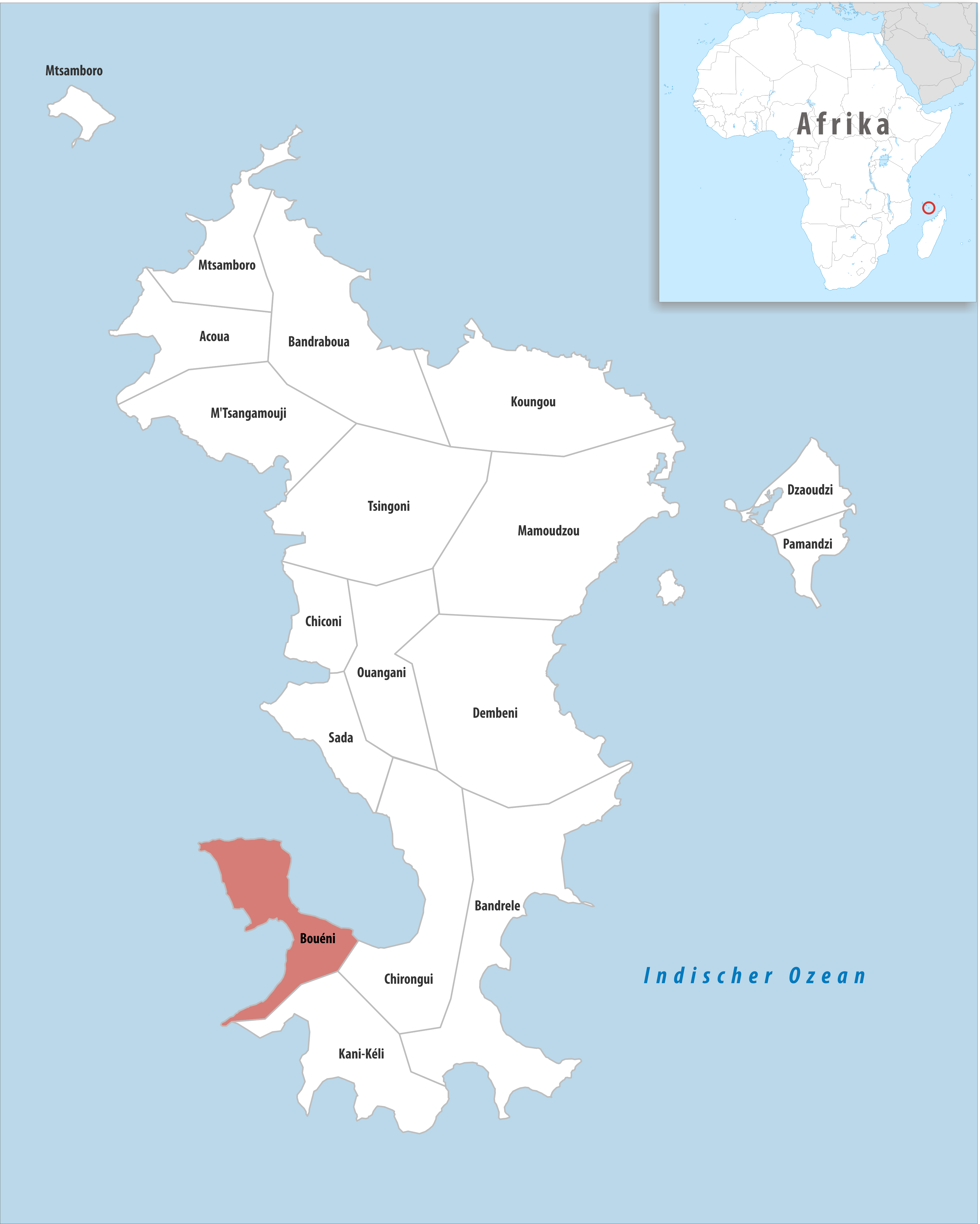
- Location of the commune (in red) within Mayotte
- Location of Bouéni
- Location within France
- Coordinates: 12°54′22″S 45°04′41″E
- Country: France
- Overseas region and department: Mayotte
- Canton: Bouéni

Government
  - Mayor (2020–2026): Mouslim Abdourahaman
- Area^{1}: 14.29 km^{2} (5.52 sq mi)
- Population (2017): 6,189
  - Density: 433.1/km^{2} (1,122/sq mi)
- Time zone: UTC+03:00
- INSEE/Postal code: 97604 /97620
- ^{1} French Land Register data, which excludes lakes, ponds, glaciers > 1 km^{2} (0.386 sq mi or 247 acres) and river estuaries.

Bouéni (French pronunciation: [bweni]) is a commune in the French overseas department of Mayotte, in the Indian Ocean.

== Geography ==
The commune of Bouéni, includes several villages :

- Moinatrindri
- Hagnoundrou
- Majiméouni
- Bambo-Ouest
- Mzouazia
- Mbouanatsa

== Notable people ==
- Taambati Moussa, guardian of Mayotte's cultural heritage

== Education ==
- Collège de Bouéni
