= Bambo-Ouest =

- Village
- Location within Mayotte
- Coordinates: 12°55′27.5″S 45°5′23.6″E
- Country: France
- Overseas Territory: Mayotte
- Commune: Bouéni
- Time zone: UTC+3 (EAT)

Bambo-Ouest is a coastal village in the southwest of Mayotte, located in the commune of Bouéni. The village is known for its marine activities such as octopus fishing, boat trips on the lagoon, shellfish fishing, and fishing for mhidzi (a type of fish), as well as its beautiful beaches.
