= 2020–21 Coupe de France preliminary rounds, Pays de la Loire =

France football contest

The 2020–21 Coupe de France preliminary rounds, Pays de la Loire was the qualifying competition to decide which teams from the leagues of the Pays de la Loire region of France took part in the main competition from the seventh round.

A total of nine teams qualified from the Pays de la Loire preliminary rounds. In 2019–20, FC Challans and Sablé FC progressed furthest in the main competition, reaching the ninth round before losing to Angoulême-Soyaux Charente (3–1) and Pau (on penalties) respectively.

== Schedule ==
A total of 522 teams entered from the region. The draw, made on 22 July 2020, required a preliminary round on 23 August 2020. This round featured 300 clubs from the district divisions, with a small number of District 1 teams exempted to the first round. The first round, which saw the Régional 3 teams enter, took place on 30 August 2020. The second round, featuring the entrance of the Régional 2 teams, took place on 6 September 2020.

The third round draw, in which the Regional 1 and Championnat National 3 teams joined the competition, was made on 10 September 2020. The fourth round draw, which saw the Championnat National 2 teams enter, was made on 23 September 2020. The fifth round draw, which saw the entry of the three Championnat National teams from the region, was made on 7 October 2020. The sixth round draw was made on 21 October 2020.

=== Preliminary round ===
These matches were played on 22 and 23 August 2020.

Preliminary round results: Pays de la Loire
Tie no	Home team (tier)	Score	Away team (tier)
1.	Aiglons Durtalois (11)	3–3 (7–6 p)	AS Mézeray (10)
2.	FC Sud Ouest Mayennais (10)	0–1	US Soudan (10)
3.	US La Chapelle-d'Aligné (11)	2–4	EA Baugeois (10)
4.	Pomjeannais JA (9)	1–0	AS Mésanger (10)
5.	US Tennie-Saint-Symphorien (10)	0–5	US Pré-en-Pail (9)
6.	USJA Saint-Martin-Aviré-Louvaine (10)	1–0	ES Belligné-Chapelle-Maumusson (9)
7.	ES Averton (11)	2–5	US Alpes Mancelles (10)
8.	FC Ménil (10)	0–1	Saint-Vincent LUSTVI (10)
9.	US Villepotaise (12)	0–1	ES Pommerieux (10)
10.	AS Brée (11)	0–2	ES Champfleur (10)
11.	CF Châtelais-Nyoiseau-Bouillé-Grugé (10)	5–3	US Saint-Aubin-des-Châteaux (10)
12.	Abbaretz-Saffré FC (10)	6–0	US Renazé (10)
13.	FC Ruillé-Loiron (10)	2–1	ES Rougé (11)
14.	ES Val Baugeois (11)	1–1 (3–4 p)	JS Ludoise (9)
15.	AS Clermont-Créans (9)	4–1	ES Morannes (10)
16.	US Villaines-Malicorne (10)	6–1	JG Coudray (9)
17.	FC Loulaysien (10)	3–1	FC Gétigné-Boussay (10)
18.	ES Azé (11)	1–1 (2–4 p)	SC Sainte-Gemmes-d'Andigné (10)
19.	FC Entente du Vignoble (10)	0–1	Etoile du Bocage (9)
20.	Hirondelles Soullandaises (11)	3–3 (5–4 p)	Eclair de Chauvé (11)
21.	US Vital Frossay (11)	1–1 (3–5 p)	AFC Bouin-Bois-de-Céné-Châteauneuf (11)
22.	AS Riezaise (12)	1–5	Herbadilla Foot (11)
23.	AS Sargéenne (10)	2–3	US Chantenay-Villedieu (10)
24.	SC Ballon (12)	0–18	JS Parigné-l'Évêque (10)
25.	Dollon Omnisports (10)	3–0	AS Étival (10)
26.	GSI Saosnois Courgains (11)	0–2	CO Cormes (9)
27.	CO Laigné-Ssint-Gervais (10)	3–0	AS Montmirail-Melleray (10)
28.	ARC Tillières (11)	1–3	Saint-Martin Treize Septiers (10)
29.	US Les Epesses-Saint-Mars (10)	1–3	ES Vallet (9)
30.	FC Villedieu-La Renaudière (12)	1–1 (3–1 p)	AS Landais (10)
31.	Olympique Sal-Tour Vézins Coron (10)	5–1	US Bazoges Beaurepaire (10)
32.	Val de Sèvre Football (10)	0–1	FC Fief Gesté (9)
33.	Bé-Léger FC (10)	4–1	RS Teiphalien Tiffauges (11)
34.	FF Mortagne-sur-Sèvre (10)	0–3	Étoile Mouzillon Foot (10)
35.	FC Val de Moine (10)	1–2	RS Ardelay (9)
36.	Les Farfadets Saint-Paul-en-Pareds (11)	0–4	Saint-Pierre Mazières (9)
37.	SS Bailleul Sport (11)	2–5	US Précigné (10)
38.	Sainte-Jamme Sportive (10)	2–4	ES Cherré (10)
39.	FC Joué-l'Abbé-La Guierche (11)	0–4	ASPTT Le Mans (9)
40.	US Savigné-l'Évêque (10)	1–0	AS Saint-Jean-d'Assé (9)
41.	ES Montfort-le-Gesnois (10)	1–3	AS Saint-Pavace (10)
42.	US Mesnard-Vendrennes (11)	2–0	Gaubretière-Saint-Martin FC (10)
43.	ES Vertou (9)	1–1 (4–3 p)	AS Bruffière Defontaine (9)
44.	Legé FC (10)	1–0	FC Bouaine Rocheservière (9)
45.	Saint-Michel SF (10)	2–0	ES La Romagne-Roussay (10)
46.	US Suplice André Mormaison (10)	0–1	AS Le-Puy-Saint-Bonnet (9)
47.	FC Meilleraie-Montournais-Menomblet (10)	0–0 (2–3 p)	Saint-Georges Guyonnière FC (9)
48.	Coëx Olympique (10)	0–0 (4–5 p)	FC Garnachois (9)
49.	AF Apremont-La Chapelle (11)	0–1	Étoile de Vie Le Fenouiller (9)
50.	FC Île de Noirmoutier (10)	3–3 (3–5 p)	Arche FC (10)
51.	USM Beauvoir-sur-Mer (10)	1–1 (3–2 p)	FC Basse Loire (Note: Shown in the draw as US Pellerinaise. The club merged with FC Brains Boiseau to form the new club.) (9)
52.	FC Falleron-Froidfond (10)	3–4	Bernerie OCA (11)
53.	FC Givrand l'Aiguillon (11)	2–7	ES des Marais (9)
54.	EM Sallertaine (11)	0–2	Océane FC (10)
55.	AS Saint-Gervais (11)	0–3	Bouguenais Football (9)
56.	Saint-Gilles-Saint-Hilaire FC (11)	1–1 (11–10 p)	FC Logne et Boulogne (10)
57.	AS Saint-Maixent-sur-Vie (10)	2–7	ES du Lac (10)
58.	Commequiers SF (10)	3–2	AS Sud Loire (10)
59.	USC Corné (12)	2–6	ES Daguenière Bohalle (11)
60.	AS Mauges (11)	1–1 (4–2 p)	US Saint-Georges-sur-Loire (11)
61.	AS Salle-Aubry-Poitevinière (11)	1–3	AS Ponts-de-Cé (9)
62.	ASC Saint-Barthélémy-d'Anjou (11)	2–5	Saint MathMénitRé FC (9)
63.	Mon Atout FC Angévin (12)	2–0	Saint-Melaine OS (10)
64.	AS Val-d'Erdre-Auxence (10)	2–5	US Combrée-Bel-Air-Noyant (10)
65.	AS Valanjou (10)	0–4	AS Avrillé (9)
66.	Doutre SC (11)	0–6	AS Écouflant (10)
67.	FC Louet-Juignéen (11)	1–1 (5–6 p)	SC Angevin (10)
68.	FC Villevêque-Soucelles (11)	3–2	ÉS Trélazé (10)
69.	ES Loire et Louet (11)	1–2	AS Saint-Sylvain-d'Anjou (9)
70.	ES Varennes Villebernier (12)	1–7	ASVR Ambillou-Château (11)
71.	ES Auverse-Mouliherne-Chavaignes-Lasse (11)	0–3	Union Saint-Leger-Saint-Germain-Champtocé Avenir (10)
72.	FC Plessis Grammoire (11)	2–0	ASR Vernantes-Vernoil (10)
73.	Club du Haut Layon (11)	0–2	AC Longué (11)
74.	ES Le Puy-Vaudelnay (11)	2–1	US Mazé (10)
75.	UF Allonnes-Brain-sur-Allonnes (10)	3–3 (5–3 p)	ES Layon (9)
76.	Sainte Christine-Bourgneuf FC (10)	1–1 (3–5 p)	Herblanetz FC (11)
77.	FC Bout' Loire-et-Evre (11)	3–4	FC Oudon-Couffé (10)
78.	UFC Erdre et Donneau (10)	5–1	FC Ingrandes-le-Fresne (11)
79.	Étoile du Don Moisdon-Meilleraye (11)	2–2 (2–4 p)	FC Fuilet-Chaussaire (10)
80.	FC Castelvarennais (11)	3–0	ES Jovéenne (11)
81.	Anjou Baconne FC (11)	2–2 (5–4 p)	Pin Sulpice Vritz FC (11)
82.	Les Touches FC (11)	3–1	FC La Pouëze/Saint-Clement-de-la-Place/Brain (10)
83.	Réveil Saint-Géréon (10)	1–1 (4–2 p)	FC Laurentais Landemontais (9)
84.	FC Landivy-Pontmain (10)	0–2	FC Lassay (9)
85.	AS Chazé-Vern (11)	0–0 (4–2 p)	AS Chemazé (10)
86.	EB Commer (11)	6–1	FC Montjean (10)
87.	US Briollay (11)	0–4	AS Ballée (10)
88.	SO Candé-Challain-Loiré (10)	1–5	ES Quelainaise (10)
89.	CS Lion d'Angers (10)	1–4	ASPTT Laval (10)
90.	AS Martigné-sur-Mayenne (9)	4–0	CS Saint-Pierre-des-Landes (10)
91.	AS Châtres-la-Forêt (11)	2–2 (4–5 p)	Moulay Sports (10)
92.	CA Voutréen (10)	2–0	CS Javron-Neuilly (10)
93.	US Désertines (11)	0–4	US Chantrigné (10)
94.	AS La Dorée (11)	0–11	ASO Montenay (10)
95.	AF Chemiré-le-Gaudin (11)	0–7	FC Louplande (10)
96.	AS Cérans-Foulletourte (11)	0–4	Internationale du Mans (10)
97.	US Breilloise (11)	0–2	US Conlie Domfront (9)
98.	Anille Braye Foot (10)	1–2	US La Chapelle-Saint-Rémy (9)
99.	Football Champagné Sport (11)	0–4	US Bouloire (9)
100.	Degré FC (11)	2–0	FC Saint-Georges-Pruillé (10)
101.	FA Laval (10)	0–7	SCL Port-Brillet (9)
102.	FC Ambrières (10)	4–4 (2–4 p)	AS Vaiges (10)
103.	US Saint-Germain-le-Fouilloux (10)	1–0	AS Le Bourgneuf-la-Forêt (9)
104.	US Cigné (9)	0–3	US Saint-Jean-sur-Mayenne (10)
105.	US Parigné-sur-Braye (11)	2–2 (2–4 p)	AS Parné (11)
106.	AS Magnils Chasnais (10)	0–1	FC Talmondais (10)
107.	FS Champgenéteux (11)	2–2 (4–5 p)	USB Juvigné (11)
108.	Union Saint-Michel-Triaize-Côte de Lumière (10)	3–1	Sainte-Foy FC (10)
109.	ES Longevillaise (10)	0–0 (5–4 p)	Loups Sportifs Sainte-Flaive-des-Loups (9)
110.	USE Dompierroise (9)	1–4	JF Boissière-des-Landes (10)
111.	RS Les Clouzeaux (10)	0–3	ES Belleville-sur-Vie (10)
112.	ES La Copechagnière (11)	1–4	Hermitage Venansault (10)
113.	US Bugallière Orvault (12)	3–5	Saint-Joseph de Porterie Nantes (11)
114.	Union Brivet Campbon Chapelle-Launay (9)	2–1	FC Toutes Aides Nantes (10)
115.	Sympho Foot Treillières (9)	1–3	Petit-Mars FC (10)
116.	JA Besné (12)	0–17	La Saint-André (9)
117.	ES Notre-Dame-des-Landes (10)	2–3 (Note: Tie reversed from original draw.)	AS Marsacais (9)
118.	FC Fay Bouvron (10)	4–4 (4–2 p)	ES Dresny-Plessé (9)
119.	FC Mesquerais (11)	1–3	Sainte-Reine-Crossac Football (9)
120.	AS Guillaumois (11)	0–4	Savenay-Malville-Prinquiau FC (9)
121.	Espérance Saint-Yves Nantes (11)	6–2	RAC Cheminots Nantes (12)
122.	Saint-Herblain OC (9)	1–2	Orvault RC (10)
123.	Donges FC (9)	4–0	Alerte de Méan (10)
124.	Saint-Cyr Foot Herbignac (10)	2–5	Héric FC (9)
125.	US Marans-Gené (11)	2–3	Le Cellier Mauves FC (9)
126.	US Thouaré (9)	1–0	Métallo Sport Chantenaysien (10)
127.	AS Landevieille (11)	0–1	ES Saint-Denis-la-Chevasse (9)
128.	JA Nesmy (11)	0–2	US Herminoise (10)
129.	US Vouvant Bourneau Cezais (12)	0–7	ES Rives de l'Yon (10)
130.	SO Fougeré-Thorigny (12)	1–1 (1–4 p)	Entente Sud Vendée (10)
131.	Étoile du Cens Nantes (13)	2–4	Nantes Sud 98 (10)
132.	FC Côte Sauvage (10)	1–2	ES Maritime (9)
133.	ES Pineaux (11)	0–7	FC Cantonal Sud Vendée (10)
134.	AS Sigournais-Saint Germain (12)	1–0	US Autize Vendée (11)
135.	SSJA Saint-Mathurin (11)	0–6	FC Généraudière Roche Sud (9)
136.	AS Grandchamp Foot (11)	0–0 (1–4 p)	SC Nord Atlantique (9)
137.	AS Damvitaise (12)	1–2	AS Dom-Tom (10)
138.	AS Moutiers-Saint-Avaugourd (11)	0–2	US Bournezeau-Saint-Hilaire (9)
139.	FC Saint-Philbert-Réorthe-Jaudonnière (11)	0–1	AS Quatre Vents Fontaines (10)
140.	FC Vallée du Graon (10)	1–2	Foot Espoir 85 (10)
141.	US Landeronde-Saint-Georges (11)	1–5	Saint-Pierre Sportif Nieul-le-Dolent (10)
142.	US Vay (11)	1–1 (4–2 p)	FC Le Gâvre-La Chevallerais (12)
143.	Nozay OS (10)	1–1 (3–5 p)	JA Saint-Mars-du-Désert (9)
144.	FC Atlantique Morbihan (19)	0–4	AS La Madeleine (9)
145.	FC Trois Rivières (10)	1–0	Amicale Saint-Lyphard (11)
146.	FC Stephanois (10)	0–0 (1–4 p)	Temple Cordemais FC (11)
147.	FC Bourgneuf-en-Retz (11)	1–5	AS Maine (10)
148.	Lombron Sports (10)	1–2	US Challes-Grand Lucé (10)
149.	Saint-Mars SF Vallons de l'Erdre (11)	0–4	FC Longuenée-en-Anjou (9)
150.	AG Champigné-Querré (11)	0–0 (1–3 p)	US Villiers-Charlemagne (10)

=== First round ===
These matches were played on 30 August, 2 September and 13 September 2020.

First round results: Pays de la Loire
Tie no	Home team (tier)	Score	Away team (tier)
1.	FC Fief Gesté (9)	1–4	Landreau-Loroux OSC (8)
2.	FC Garnachois (9)	3–3 (4–3 p)	Saint-Pierre de Retz (8)
3.	AS Saint-Pavace (10)	2–0	Degré FC (11)
4.	Arche FC (10)	1–2	Écureils des Pays de Monts (8)
5.	ES des Marais (9)	4–1	Alliance Sud-Retz Machecoul (8)
6.	AFC Bouin-Bois-de-Céné-Châteauneuf (11)	3–3 (3–2 p)	Océane FC (10)
7.	US Challes-Grand Lucé (10)	0–1	US Saint-Mars-la-Brière (9)
8.	AS Maine (10)	0–0 (5–6 p)	AS Boufféré (8)
9.	FC Sud Sèvre et Maine (9)	0–2	Saint-Michel SF (10)
10.	ES Vallet (9)	1–1 (5–6 p)	US Bequots-Lucquois (8)
11.	Internationale du Mans (10)	1–1 (4–5 p)	EG Rouillon (8)
12.	FC Villedieu-La Renaudière (12)	1–2	FC Chavagnes-La Rabatelière (9)
13.	US Bernardière-Cugand (9)	0–4	FC Côteaux du Vignoble (8)
14.	Bouguenais Football (9)	9–0	USM Beauvoir-sur-Mer (10)
15.	FC Castelvarennais (11)	0–1 (Note: Tie reversed since original draw.)	Herblanetz FC (11)
16.	JS Allonnes (8)	0–3	FC Saint-Saturnin-La Milesse (8)
17.	FC La Bazoge (8)	1–4	US Arnage Pontlieue (8)
18.	US Cantenay-Épinard (8)	1–2	AS Clermont-Créans (9)
19.	FC Villevêque-Soucelles (11)	3–1	US Villaines-Malicorne (10)
20.	SC Sainte-Gemmes-d'Andigné (10)	0–1	ASL L'Huisserie Foot (9)
21.	US Combrée-Bel-Air-Noyant (10)	2–1	US Laval (8)
22.	CF Châtelais-Nyoiseau-Bouillé-Grugé (10)	1–3	US Entrammes (8)
23.	FC Longuenée-en-Anjou (9)	5–1	US Dionysienne (8)
24.	US Toutlemonde Maulévrier (9)	2–3	Flochamont-sur-Sèvre FC (8)
25.	AS Ballée (10)	0–1	Aiglons Durtalois (11)
26.	AS Longeron-Torfou (9)	0–3	US Chauché (8)
27.	Saint-Pierre Mazières (9)	3–0	FC Mouchamps-Rochetrejoux (8)
28.	Energie Le May-sur-Èvre (9)	2–0	US Mesnard-Vendrennes (11)
29.	Saint-Martin Treize Septiers (10)	1–1 (0–3 p)	EA La Tessoualle (8)
30.	RS Ardelay (9)	0–2	FC Portugais Cholet (8)
31.	AS Le-Puy-Saint-Bonnet (9)	1–3	Vigilante Saint Fulgent (8)
32.	US Chantenay-Villedieu (10)	4–2	AS Martigné-sur-Mayenne (9)
33.	US Alpes Mancelles (10)	6–2	Moulay Sports (10)
34.	ES Champfleur (10)	3–0	CA Voutréen (10)
35.	US Précigné (10)	1–3	AS Saint-Sylvain-d'Anjou (9)
36.	Herbadilla Foot (11)	3–1	Commequiers SF (10)
37.	FC Loulaysien (10)	0–5	FC Grand Lieu (9)
38.	FC Saint-Laurent Malvent (9)	0–2	Christophe-Séguinière (8)
39.	Saint-Georges Guyonnière FC (9)	5–0	Olympique Sal-Tour Vézins Coron (10)
40.	Etoile du Bocage (9)	1–2	FC Retz (8)
41.	Nort ACF (8)	4–1	Olympique Liré-Drain (8)
42.	FC Fuilet-Chaussaire (10)	3–3 (7–8 p)	US Varades (8)
43.	ES Rives de l'Yon (10)	1–5	Sud Vendée Football (8)
44.	US Bournezeau-Saint-Hilaire (9)	1–1 (3–4 p)	FC Plaine et Bocage (8)
45.	Entente Sud Vendée (10)	0–5	Pays de Chantonnay Foot (8)
46.	AS Quatre Vents Fontaines (10)	1–3	FC Jard-Avrillé (8)
47.	FC Cantonal Sud Vendée (10)	1–1 (1–3 p)	US Aubigny (8)
48.	JF Boissière-des-Landes (10)	1–5	FC Achards (8)
49.	AS Sigournais-Saint Germain (12)	0–7	FC Généraudière Roche Sud (9)
50.	Saint-Pierre Sportif Nieul-le-Dolent (10)	3–0	FC Saint-Julien-Vairé (8)
51.	Foot Espoir 85 (10)	1–1 (4–2 p)	FC Mouilleron-Thouarsais-Caillère (8)
52.	AS Dom-Tom (10)	1–4	Entente Cheffois-Antigny-Saint-Maurice (8)
53.	Hermitage Venansault (10)	0–3	FC Cécilien Martinoyen (8)
54.	FC Talmondais (10)	0–1	FC Robretières La Roche-sur-Yon (8)
55.	FC La Génétouze (9)	0–2	ES Longevillaise (10)
56.	Étoile de Vie Le Fenouiller (9)	0–0 (3–2 p)	Union Saint-Michel-Triaize-Côte de Lumière (10)
57.	ES Belleville-sur-Vie (10)	5–1	Hirondelles Soullandaises (11)
58.	US Herminoise (10)	0–1	La Chaize FEC (8)
59.	FC Nieul-Maillezais-Les Autises (9)	2–1	ES Grosbreuil-Girouard (9)
60.	Saint-Gilles-Saint-Hilaire FC (11)	2–2 (2–4 p)	FC Saligny (9)
61.	ES Saint-Denis-la-Chevasse (9)	2–4	BoupèreMonProuant FC (9)
62.	JS Solesmienne (8)	2–2 (3–5 p)	AS Meslay-du-Maine (8)
63.	ASPTT Le Mans (9)	2–0	US Savigné-l'Évêque (10)
64.	JS Parigné-l'Évêque (10)	3–6	ES Yvré-l'Évêque (8)
65.	Saint MathMénitRé FC (9)	2–0	FC Val du Loir (9)
66.	ES Haute Goulaine (9)	0–2	Bé-Léger FC (10)
67.	Étoile Mouzillon Foot (10)	5–2	AS Mauges (11)
68.	FC Beaupréau La Chapelle (8)	3–2	US Thouaré (9)
69.	Petit-Mars FC (10)	2–0	AS Chazé-Vern (11)
70.	Saint-Georges Trémentines FC (9)	1–1 (0–3 p)	FC Mouzeil-Teillé-Ligné (8)
71.	Union Saint-Leger-Saint-Germain-Champtocé Avenir (10)	3–0	Réveil Saint-Géréon (10)
72.	Le Cellier Mauves FC (9)	1–1 (4–1 p)	Cholet FC 2020 (9)
73.	FC Oudon-Couffé (10)	1–3	Saint-André-Saint-Macaire FC (8)
74.	SomloirYzernay CPF (9)	2–0	Hirondelle Football (8)
75.	ES Cherré (10)	4–4 (2–0 p)	US Vibraysienne (9)
76.	CO Castélorien (9)	0–3	US Bazouges-Cré (8)
77.	US La Chapelle-Saint-Rémy (9)	6–0	Dollon Omnisports (10)
78.	JS Ludoise (9)	1–4	FC Pellouailles-Corze (9)
79.	Bernerie OCA (11)	0–8	Saint-Marc Football (9)
80.	Héric FC (9)	2–0	JGE Sucé-sur-Erdre (8)
81.	ES du Lac (10)	1–4	FC Bouaye (8)
82.	SC Avessac-Fégréac (8)	3–0 (Note: Tie won by means of forfeit.)	ES Vertou (9)
83.	FC La Montagne (8)	3–2	Nant'Est FC (9)
84.	Nantes Sud 98 (10)	0–4	AEPR Rezé (8)
85.	Nantes Saint-Pierre (8)	1–0	Nantes La Mellinet (9)
86.	Orvault RC (10)	3–2	UF Saint-Herblain (8)
87.	JA Saint-Mars-du-Désert (9)	1–4	Olympique Bécon-Villemoisan-Saint-Augustin (8)
88.	UFC Erdre et Donneau (10)	3–2	USJA Saint-Martin-Aviré-Louvaine (10)
89.	SCL Port-Brillet (9)	4–1	US Saint-Germain-le-Fouilloux (10)
90.	US Chantrigné (10)	2–2 (5–4 p)	EB Commer (11)
91.	US Fougerolles-du-Plessis (9)	1–1 (4–3 p)	USC Pays de Montsûrs (8)
92.	ASPTT Laval (10)	0–0 (5–3 p)	Montreuil-Juigné Béné Football (8)
93.	US Forcé (8)	1–1 (1–4 p)	US Saint-Berthevin (9)
94.	FC Lassay (9)	1–2	US Saint-Pierre-la-Cour (8)
95.	US Le Genest (9)	0–4	Gorron FC (8)
96.	USB Juvigné (11)	2–1	US Aronnaise (9)
97.	ASO Montenay (10)	2–0	US Pays de Juhel (8)
98.	AS Parné (11)	4–5	Voltigeurs Saint-Georges-Buttavent (9)
99.	ES Craon (8)	1–3	AS Marsacais (9)
100.	AS Andouillé (9)	0–2	AS Contest-Saint Baudelle (8)
101.	AS Vaiges (10)	4–0	FC Pays de Sillé (8)
102.	JA Soulgé-sur-Ouette (8)	0–1	CA Loué (8)
103.	ES Pommerieux (10)	1–5	Les Touches FC (11)
104.	Hermine Saint-Ouennaise (8)	0–0 (5–4 p)	AL Châteaubriant (8)
105.	Saint-Vincent LUSTVI (10)	1–5	FC Château-Gontier (8)
106.	SC Nord Atlantique (9)	3–0	Athletic Laigné-Loigné (8)
107.	US Soudan (10)	1–2	FC Ruillé-Loiron (10)
108.	Alerte Ahuillé FC (9)	0–1	Abbaretz-Saffré FC (10)
109.	US Saint-Jean-sur-Mayenne (10)	1–2	Jeunes d'Erbray (8)
110.	US Pré-en-Pail (9)	0–1	Beaumont SA (8)
111.	ES Quelainaise (10)	0–2	USA Pouancé (8)
112.	US Villiers-Charlemagne (10)	1–3	Anjou Baconne FC (11)
113.	La Vigilante Mayet (9)	0–3	ES Moncé (8)
114.	ES Andard-Brain (8)	0–1	ES Montilliers (8)
115.	US Vay (11)	1–4	AOS Pontchâteau (9)
116.	CO Laigné-Ssint-Gervais (10)	0–5	Écommoy FC (8)
117.	Football Chalonnes-Chaudefonds (8)	3–0	US Beaufort-en-Vallée (8)
118.	Saint-Joseph de Porterie Nantes (11)	1–2	Espérance Saint-Yves Nantes (11)
119.	AS Juigné-sur-Sarthe (9)	1–0	US Guécélard (8)
120.	ES Daguenière Bohalle (11)	1–4	RC Doué-la-Fontaine (8)
121.	AS La Madeleine (9)	0–1	ES Pornichet (8)
122.	CO Cormes (9)	1–3	La Patriote Bonnétable (8)
123.	ASVR Ambillou-Château (11)	4–3	AS Ponts-de-Cé (9)
124.	La Saint-André (9)	1–1 (5–4 p)	FC Trois Rivières (10)
125.	AS Saint-Hilaire-Vihiers-Saint-Paul (8)	0–0 (4–3 p)	Pomjeannais JA (9)
126.	FC Guémené-Massérac (9)	1–3	Union Brivet Campbon Chapelle-Launay (9)
127.	FC Louplande (10)	1–1 (3–4 p)	SS Noyen-sur-Sarthe (8)
128.	CAS Possosavennières (9)	2–5	Croix Blanche Angers (8)
129.	Temple Cordemais FC (11)	1–3	Donges FC (9)
130.	Andrezé-Jub-Jallais FC (9)	2–1	Intrépide Angers Foot (8)
131.	US Glonnières (8)	4–3	US Conlie Domfront (9)
132.	Sainte-Reine-Crossac Football (9)	2–2 (4–5 p)	FC Fay Bouvron (10)
133.	AS Lac de Maine (9)	0–2	AS Bayard-Saumur (8)
134.	SO Maine (9)	0–3	US Mansigné (8)
135.	ES Maritime (9)	1–1 (6–5 p)	FC Brière (8)
136.	FC Plessis Grammoire (11)	2–4	AS Avrillé (9)
137.	US Bouloire (9)	0–6	AS La Chapelle-St-Aubin (8)
138.	Savenay-Malville-Prinquiau FC (9)	3–1	FC Immaculée (9)
139.	US Roézé-Voivres (9)	6–1	AS Ruaudin (9)
140.	FC Chabossière (9)	10–1	Legé FC (10)
141.	Mon Atout FC Angévin (12)	1–5	EA Baugeois (10)
142.	FC Presqu'île Vilaine (10)	1–2	FC La Chapelle-des-Marais (8)
143.	SC Angevin (10)	1–1 (3–2 p)	ES Le Puy-Vaudelnay (11)
144.	AS Écouflant (10)	1–1 (3–2 p)	UC Auvers-Poillé (9)
145.	AC Longué (11)	0–2	UF Allonnes-Brain-sur-Allonnes (10)

=== Second round ===
These matches were played on 5, 6 and 13 September 2020, with two postponed to 20 September 2020.

Second round results: Pays de la Loire
Tie no	Home team (tier)	Score	Away team (tier)
1.	Sud Vendée Football (8)	3–1	Flochamont-sur-Sèvre FC (8)
2.	SC Avessac-Fégréac (8)	0–1	Elan Sorinières Football (7)
3.	Étoile Mouzillon Foot (10)	2–0	Herbadilla Foot (11)
4.	Savenay-Malville-Prinquiau FC (9)	2–0	ES Maritime (9)
5.	CA Loué (8)	3–1	AS La Chapelle-St-Aubin (8)
6.	Aiglons Durtalois (11)	1–3	SS Noyen-sur-Sarthe (8)
7.	ES Yvré-l'Évêque (8)	1–3	Écommoy FC (8)
8.	Les Touches FC (11)	1–5	Union Saint-Leger-Saint-Germain-Champtocé Avenir (10)
9.	FC La Chapelle-des-Marais (8)	2–5	Saint-Aubin-Guérande Football (7)
10.	US Combrée-Bel-Air-Noyant (10)	0–3	Football Chalonnes-Chaudefonds (8)
11.	US Bazouges-Cré (8)	1–1 (5–3 p)	US Mansigné (8)
12.	US Saint-Berthevin (9)	0–0 (2–4 p)	SC Nord Atlantique (9)
13.	FC Villevêque-Soucelles (11)	1–4	Olympique Bécon-Villemoisan-Saint-Augustin (8)
14.	AS Avrillé (9)	3–1	AS Écouflant (10)
15.	AS Meslay-du-Maine (8)	0–1	ES Segré (7)
16.	FC Château-Gontier (8)	1–0	AS Tiercé-Cheffes (8)
17.	SC Angevin (10)	0–3	ES Aubance (7)
18.	FC Jard-Avrillé (8)	1–0	FC Cécilien Martinoyen (8)
19.	Écureils des Pays de Monts (8)	1–3	AS Vieillevigne-La Planche (7)
20.	ES Moncé (8)	4–2	US Roézé-Voivres (9)
21.	Saint MathMénitRé FC (9)	0–0 (1–4 p)	AS Bayard-Saumur (8)
22.	ES Montilliers (8)	5–0	Herblanetz FC (11)
23.	Saint-Marc Football (9)	1–3	La Saint-André (9)
24.	UF Allonnes-Brain-sur-Allonnes (10)	0–1	SomloirYzernay CPF (9)
25.	Union Brivet Campbon Chapelle-Launay (9)	0–3	US La Baule-Le Pouliguen (7)
26.	ES Pornichet (8)	2–0	Pornic Foot (7)
27.	FC Pellouailles-Corze (9)	0–0 (3–2 p)	ES Bouchemaine (7)
28.	AS Boufféré (8)	1–1 (6–7 p)	AS Saint-Pierre-Montrevault (7)
29.	AFC Bouin-Bois-de-Céné-Châteauneuf (11)	2–11	AOS Pontchâteau (9)
30.	Espérance Saint-Yves Nantes (11)	0–1	Saint-Michel SF (10)
31.	Orvault RC (10)	0–4	Étoile de Clisson (7)
32.	US Loire et Divatte (7)	3–1	ASC Saint-Médard-de-Doulon Nantes (7)
33.	Héric FC (9)	2–2 (1–3 p)	Nantes Saint-Pierre (8)
34.	AEPR Rezé (8)	2–0	Bouguenais Football (9)
35.	EA Baugeois (10)	0–1	AS Saint-Hilaire-Vihiers-Saint-Paul (8)
36.	AS Marsacais (9)	4–0	UFC Erdre et Donneau (10)
37.	EA La Tessoualle (8)	1–1 (3–0 p)	Saint-André-Saint-Macaire FC (8)
38.	USJA Carquefou (7)	4–2	Nort ACF (8)
39.	AC Saint-Brevin (7)	3–0	FC La Montagne (8)
40.	RC Doué-la-Fontaine (8)	0–3	Angers Vaillante Foot (7)
41.	FC Chabossière (9)	0–1	Élan de Gorges Foot (7)
42.	Abbaretz-Saffré FC (10)	2–2 (3–4 p)	ES Vigneux (7)
43.	ASVR Ambillou-Château (11)	2–2 (3–4 p)	Andrezé-Jub-Jallais FC (9)
44.	FC Mouzeil-Teillé-Ligné (8)	0–2	ES Blain (7)
45.	AC Chapelain Foot (7)	2–2 (5–4 p)	RC Ancenis 44 (7)
46.	FC Plaine et Bocage (8)	2–1	La France d'Aizenay (7)
47.	Anjou Baconne FC (11)	0–4	Petit-Mars FC (10)
48.	FC Côteaux du Vignoble (8)	2–0	FC Montaigu 85 (7)
49.	Landreau-Loroux OSC (8)	1–1 (3–5 p)	Étoile de Vie Le Fenouiller (9)
50.	FC Grand Lieu (9)	7–1	FC Garnachois (9)
51.	FC Bouaye (8)	4–1	Saint-Georges Guyonnière FC (9)
52.	FC Fay Bouvron (10)	0–1	ES des Marais (9)
53.	Donges FC (9)	4–0	ES Belleville-sur-Vie (10)
54.	FC Retz (8)	1–3	Mouilleron SF (7)
55.	AS Clermont-Créans (9)	5–0	US Chantenay-Villedieu (10)
56.	US Saint-Mars-la-Brière (9)	1–2	ES Cherré (10)
57.	Jeunes d'Erbray (8)	3–2	US Saint-Pierre-la-Cour (8)
58.	AS Saint-Sylvain-d'Anjou (9)	0–0 (4–2 p)	US Lucéene (7)
59.	FC Longuenée-en-Anjou (9)	0–1	US Nautique Spay (7)
60.	Bé-Léger FC (10)	0–0 (3–4 p)	Le Cellier Mauves FC (9)
61.	US Varades (8)	1–4	Olympique Chemillé-Melay (7)
62.	LSG Les Brouzils (7)	0–0 (5–4 p)	Christophe-Séguinière (8)
63.	FC Portugais Cholet (8)	1–0	FC Essartais (7)
64.	USA Pouancé (8)	3–4	US Méral-Cossé (7)
65.	Voltigeurs Saint-Georges-Buttavent (9)	1–1 (8–9 p)	SA Mamertins (7)
66.	SCL Port-Brillet (9)	0–6	Patriote Brulonnaise (7)
67.	AS Vaiges (10)	2–3	CS Changé (7)
68.	Montreuil-Juigné Béné Football (8)	2–1	AS Le Mans Villaret (7)
69.	La Patriote Bonnétable (8)	3–2	ASPTT Le Mans (9)
70.	EG Rouillon (8)	5–0	AS Juigné-sur-Sarthe (9)
71.	US Arnage Pontlieue (8)	1–1 (6–5 p)	US Glonnières (8)
72.	Beaumont SA (8)	1–1 (4–3 p)	US La Chapelle-Saint-Rémy (9)
73.	FC Chavagnes-La Rabatelière (9)	1–0	Foot Espoir 85 (10)
74.	La Chaize FEC (8)	2–1	FC Nieul-Maillezais-Les Autises (9)
75.	AS Contest-Saint Baudelle (8)	1–1 (5–6 p)	Louverné Sports (7)
76.	ASL L'Huisserie Foot (9)	3–3 (5–3 p)	Gorron FC (8)
77.	FC Saint-Saturnin-La Milesse (8)	1–0	AS Seiches-sur-le-Loire-Marcé (7)
78.	FC Généraudière Roche Sud (9)	1–1 (4–5 p)	US Bequots-Lucquois (8)
79.	US Aubigny (8)	1–3	ES Marsouins Brétignolles-Brem (7)
80.	US Fougerolles-du-Plessis (9)	1–1 (4–2 p)	FC Ruillé-Loiron (10)
81.	USB Juvigné (11)	1–2	ASO Montenay (10)
82.	US Chantrigné (10)	1–1 (4–2 p)	Hermine Saint-Ouennaise (8)
83.	AS Saint-Pavace (10)	0–0 (2–4 p)	US Alpes Mancelles (10)
84.	ES Champfleur (10)	2–3	CA Evronnais (7)
85.	FC Robretières La Roche-sur-Yon (8)	3–4	Entente Cheffois-Antigny-Saint-Maurice (8)
86.	Pays de Chantonnay Foot (8)	2–1	FC Achards (8)
87.	Vigilante Saint Fulgent (8)	3–0	Energie Le May-sur-Èvre (9)
88.	US Chauché (8)	2–2 (5–4 p)	Saint-Pierre Mazières (9)
89.	ES Longevillaise (10)	0–3	Mareuil SC (7)
90.	BoupèreMonProuant FC (9)	0–1	Saint-Pierre Sportif Nieul-le-Dolent (10)
91.	Luçon FC (7)	5–0 (Note: Tie reversed from original draw.)	FC Saligny (9)
92.	US Entrammes (8)	3–1	Ernéenne Foot (7)
93.	Croix Blanche Angers (8)	2–0	FC Beaupréau La Chapelle (8)

=== Third round ===
These matches were played on 19 and 20 September 2020, with six postponed until 27 September. (Note: La Roche VF were given a bye to the fourth round, due to the inability of the Saint Pierre and Miquelon qualifying team to travel to France.)

Third round results: Pays de la Loire
Tie no	Home team (tier)	Score	Away team (tier)
1.	SC Nord Atlantique (9)	0–1	AOS Pontchâteau (9)
2.	AEPR Rezé (8)	1–4	Olympique Saumur FC (5)
3.	Étoile de Vie Le Fenouiller (9)	1–2 (3–4 p)	Ancienne Château-Gontier (6)
4.	Saint-Michel SF (10)	1–1 (6–7 p)	FC Jard-Avrillé (8)
5.	US Entrammes (8)	2–1	AC Saint-Brevin (7)
6.	ESOF La Roche-sur-Yon (6)	2–0	AS Saint-Pierre-Montrevault (7)
7.	AS Saint-Sylvain-d'Anjou (9)	1–4	AS La Châtaigneraie (5)
8.	Luçon FC (7)	1–3	FC Rezé (6)
9.	Sud Vendée Football (8)	0–3	JSC Bellevue Nantes (6)
10.	ES Marsouins Brétignolles-Brem (7)	4–0	Entente Cheffois-Antigny-Saint-Maurice (8)
11.	Angers Vaillante Foot (7)	0–2	US Loire et Divatte (7)
12.	FC Saint-Saturnin-La Milesse (8)	0–0 (2–3 p)	NDC Angers (6)
13.	ES Pornichet (8)	2–2 (3–4 p)	US Bazouges-Cré (8)
14.	ES Cherré (10)	0–5	La Chaize FEC (8)
15.	AS Avrillé (9)	2–2 (5–4 p)	USJA Carquefou (7)
16.	JS Coulaines (6)	2–3	Pouzauges Bocage FC (5)
17.	FC Grand Lieu (9)	2–0	Pays de Chantonnay Foot (8)
18.	AS Bourny Laval (6)	1–1 (5–4 p)	Étoile de Clisson (7)
19.	US La Baule-Le Pouliguen (7)	1–1 (4–5 p)	Vigilante Saint Fulgent (8)
20.	CA Loué (8)	0–3	US Philbertine Football (5)
21.	ES Montilliers (8)	3–1	US Fougerolles-du-Plessis (9)
22.	La Flèche RC (6)	1–1 (5–6 p)	VS Fertois (6)
23.	US Chauché (8)	2–8	Orvault SF (6)
24.	Élan de Gorges Foot (7)	3–0	Nantes Saint-Pierre (8)
25.	Union Saint-Leger-Saint-Germain-Champtocé Avenir (10)	0–3	Elan Sorinières Football (7)
26.	Le Cellier Mauves FC (9)	1–0	SC Beaucouzé (6)
27.	Saint-Pierre Sportif Nieul-le-Dolent (10)	6–0	SS Noyen-sur-Sarthe (8)
28.	Olympique Bécon-Villemoisan-Saint-Augustin (8)	1–1 (3–0 p)	FC Pellouailles-Corze (9)
29.	Étoile Mouzillon Foot (10)	0–3	AS Clermont-Créans (9)
30.	ES Segré (7)	0–0 (4–3 p)	SA Mamertins (7)
31.	Louverné Sports (7)	0–4	Vendée Poiré-sur-Vie Football (5)
32.	AS Bayard-Saumur (8)	0–3	La Patriote Bonnétable (8)
33.	US Bequots-Lucquois (8)	3–1	Olympique Chemillé-Melay (7)
34.	Écommoy FC (8)	5–1	FC Côteaux du Vignoble (8)
35.	Donges FC (9)	3–3 (1–5 p)	ES Vigneux (7)
36.	Vendée Fontenay Foot (5)	3–0	AS Sautron (5)
37.	ASO Montenay (10)	2–1	AS Marsacais (9)
38.	Beaumont SA (8)	1–0	EG Rouillon (8)
39.	Savenay-Malville-Prinquiau FC (9)	1–1 (4–2 p)	CA Evronnais (7)
40.	ASI Mûrs-Erigné (6)	3–4	Saint-Nazaire AF (6)
41.	ASL L'Huisserie Foot (9)	1–3	Mareuil SC (7)
42.	Petit-Mars FC (10)	1–0	Saint-Aubin-Guérande Football (7)
43.	SomloirYzernay CPF (9)	0–4	AS Mulsanne-Teloché (6)
44.	Patriote Brulonnaise (7)	2–6	Saint-Sébastien FC (6)
45.	FC Bouaye (8)	0–2	US Changé (5)
46.	CS Changé (7)	2–1	FC Portugais Cholet (8)
47.	ES Bonchamp (6)	1–1 (5–4 p)	FC Olonne Château (6)
48.	AS Saint-Hilaire-Vihiers-Saint-Paul (8)	2–2 (3–2 p)	FC Château-Gontier (8)
49.	US Chantrigné (10)	1–2	ES Blain (7)
50.	Sablé FC (5)	0–0 (4–2 p)	USSA Vertou (5)
51.	ES des Marais (9)	1–1 (5–4 p)	La Saint-André (9)
52.	AS Vieillevigne-La Planche (7)	0–1	FC Plaine et Bocage (8)
53	US Alpes Mancelles (10)	0–6	FC Challans (5)
54.	AC Basse-Goulaine (6)	3–1	La Suze FC (6)
55.	FE Trélazé (6)	0–0 (5–6 p)	Stade Mayennais FC (6)
56.	EA La Tessoualle (8)	1–1 (3–1 p)	TVEC Les Sables-d'Olonne (6)
57.	AC Chapelain Foot (7)	3–0	LSG Les Brouzils (7)
58.	FC Chavagnes-La Rabatelière (9)	0–5	US Nautique Spay (7)
59.	Jeunes d'Erbray (8)	0–1	Montreuil-Juigné Béné Football (8)
60.	ES Moncé (8)	1–1 (4–2 p)	Croix Blanche Angers (8)
61.	Andrezé-Jub-Jallais FC (9)	3–0	US Arnage Pontlieue (8)
62.	Mouilleron SF (7)	6–1	US Méral-Cossé (7)
63.	Football Chalonnes-Chaudefonds (8)	1–2	ES Aubance (7)

=== Fourth round ===
These matches were played on 3 and 4 October 2020, with five postponed to 10, 11 and 14 October 2020.

Fourth round results: Pays de la Loire
Tie no	Home team (tier)	Score	Away team (tier)
1.	Vigilante Saint Fulgent (8)	3–2	ES Aubance (7)
2.	ES des Marais (9)	1–1 (4–3 p)	Olympique Bécon-Villemoisan-Saint-Augustin (8)
3.	AS Saint-Hilaire-Vihiers-Saint-Paul (8)	2–4	Sablé FC (5)
4.	ASO Montenay (10)	1–5	US Changé (5)
5.	JSC Bellevue Nantes (6)	1–1 (4–3 p)	ES Marsouins Brétignolles-Brem (7)
6.	Mareuil SC (7)	7–0	US Bazouges-Cré (8)
7.	US Entrammes (8)	0–0 (4–2 p)	FC Rezé (6)
8.	AS Clermont-Créans (9)	0–5	AS Mulsanne-Teloché (6)
9.	NDC Angers (6)	2–1 (Note: Tie reversed from original draw.)	ESOF La Roche-sur-Yon (6)
10.	AOS Pontchâteau (9)	0–3	Voltigeurs de Châteaubriant (4)
11.	Savenay-Malville-Prinquiau FC (9)	0–1	Vendée Fontenay Foot (5)
12.	Petit-Mars FC (10)	2–1	Le Cellier Mauves FC (9)
13.	ES Segré (7)	0–5	US Philbertine Football (5)
14.	La Chaize FEC (8)	0–4	AC Basse-Goulaine (6)
15.	La Patriote Bonnétable (8)	5–0	Andrezé-Jub-Jallais FC (9)
16.	US Loire et Divatte (7)	3–0	AS Bourny Laval (6)
17.	Mouilleron SF (7)	1–0	CS Changé (7)
18.	FC Jard-Avrillé (8)	2–3	AS La Châtaigneraie (5)
19.	ES Montilliers (8)	1–2	Saint-Nazaire AF (6)
20.	ES Blain (7)	8–0	ES Moncé (8)
21.	VS Fertois (6)	0–1	ES Bonchamp (6)
22.	Les Herbiers VF (4)	4–1	Pouzauges Bocage FC (5)
23.	Stade Mayennais FC (6)	1–2	Élan de Gorges Foot (7)
24.	FC Plaine et Bocage (8)	1–1 (2–4 p)	Ancienne Château-Gontier (6)
25.	AC Chapelain Foot (7)	1–4	FC Challans (5)
26.	ES Vigneux (7)	2–1	Beaumont SA (8)
27.	EA La Tessoualle (8)	0–2	US Bequots-Lucquois (8)
28.	Écommoy FC (8)	2–1	FC Grand Lieu (9)
29.	Elan Sorinières Football (7)	0–4	La Roche VF (5)
30.	AS Avrillé (9)	1–3	US Nautique Spay (7)
31.	Vendée Poiré-sur-Vie Football (5)	3–1	Orvault SF (6)
32.	Saint-Pierre Sportif Nieul-le-Dolent (10)	0–9	Olympique Saumur FC (5)
33.	Montreuil-Juigné Béné Football (8)	0–2	Saint-Sébastien FC (6)

=== Fifth round ===
These matches were played on 17 and 18 October 2020, with five postponed to 24 and 25 October and two postponed to 31 January 2021.

Fifth round results: Pays de la Loire
Tie no	Home team (tier)	Score	Away team (tier)
1.	FC Challans (5)	1–0	SO Cholet (3)
2.	US Nautique Spay (7)	0–1	US Changé (5)
3.	Vigilante Saint Fulgent (8)	1–0	US Loire et Divatte (7)
4.	AC Basse-Goulaine (6)	0–2	La Roche VF (5)
5.	La Patriote Bonnétable (8)	2–4	Saint-Nazaire AF (6)
6.	ES Blain (7)	2–4	Voltigeurs de Châteaubriant (4)
7.	US Bequots-Lucquois (8)	3–1	Ancienne Château-Gontier (6)
8.	AS Mulsanne-Teloché (6)	2–2 (5–6 p)	ES Vigneux (7)
9.	ES des Marais (9)	0–2	Vendée Fontenay Foot (5)
10.	Mareuil SC (7)	1–3	Sablé FC (5)
11.	JSC Bellevue Nantes (6)	0–3	Les Herbiers VF (4)
12.	NDC Angers (6)	0–4	Stade Lavallois (3)
13.	Petit-Mars FC (10)	1–3	ES Bonchamp (6)
14.	Mouilleron SF (7)	1–2	Vendée Poiré-sur-Vie Football (5)
15.	Élan de Gorges Foot (7)	4–2	US Entrammes (8)
16.	Écommoy FC (8)	1–4	US Philbertine Football (5)
17.	AS La Châtaigneraie (5)	1–1 (2–3 p)	Olympique Saumur FC (5)
18.	Saint-Sébastien FC (6)	1–3	Le Mans FC (3)

=== Sixth round ===
These matches were played on 30 and 31 January 2021, with two postponed to 6 and 7 February 2021.

Sixth round results: Pays de la Loire
Tie no	Home team (tier)	Score	Away team (tier)
1.	La Roche VF (5)	1–3	Sablé FC (5)
2.	Élan de Gorges Foot (7)	2–2 (5–3 p)	FC Challans (5)
3.	Olympique Saumur FC (5)	4–0	ES Bonchamp (6)
4.	Vendée Fontenay Foot (5)	1–1 (7–6 p)	Saint-Nazaire AF (6)
5.	US Bequots-Lucquois (8)	1–1 (1–3 p)	US Changé (5)
6.	Les Herbiers VF (4)	3–3 (4–2 p)	Vendée Poiré-sur-Vie Football (5)
7.	ES Vigneux (7)	1–2	Stade Lavallois (3)
8.	Vigilante Saint Fulgent (8)	1–3	US Philbertine Football (5)
9.	Voltigeurs de Châteaubriant (4)	1–0	Le Mans FC (3)
