= Mliha =

Village in French overseas territory Mayott

Coordinates: 12°44′59″S 45°3′22″E

Mliha is a village in the commune of M'Tsangamouji on Mayotte.
