= AS Jumeaux de Mzouazia =

Football club based in Mzouazia, Mayotte, France

Jumeaux de Mzouazia
- Full name: Association Sportive des Jumeaux de Mzouazia
- Stadium: Stade de Mzouazia
- Chairman: Lami Alonzo
- Manager: Ali Djamalidine
- League: Régional 1 Mayotte

Association Sportive des Jumeaux de Mzouazia, also known as AS Jumeaux or Jumeaux de Mzouazia, is a football club based in Mzouazia, Mayotte, France. It competes in the Régional 1 Mayotte, the highest tier of football in Mayotte.

In the 2021–22 Coupe de France, the club reached the round of 64 before being eliminated by Ligue 1 side Bordeaux in a 10–0 defeat.

== Squad ==
Note: Flags indicate national team as defined under FIFA eligibility rules; some limited exceptions apply. Players may hold more than one non-FIFA nationality.

No.	Pos.	Nation	Player
—	GK		Harouna Moussa
—	GK		Moussa Ibrahim Msafire
—	DF		Madi Sidi
—	DF		Yazdou Said
—	DF		Djamaldine Sidi
—	DF		Djouhoudi Chyti
—	DF		Saindou Bamdou
—	DF		Cheik Ahamed
—	MF		Rouchdi Djanfar
—	MF		Djadid Dina Kamal

No.	Pos.	Nation	Player
—	MF		Fouad Dina Kamal
—	MF		Abdel Had Mohamed
—	MF		Nassim Zafi Moussa
—	MF		Attoumani Magnele Amed
—	MF		Belayd Dina Kamal
—	FW		Antoissi Loutoufi
—	FW		Adifane Hamada Noussoura
—	FW		Ymadoudine Abdou
—	FW		Mohamed Abdou
—	FW		Moumadjadou Souf
