= FC Mtsapéré =

- Full name: Football Club de Mtsapéré
- Founded: 1978
- Ground: Stade du Baobab; Mtsapere, Mayotte
- Capacity: 1,000
- Chairman: Sidi Ahmed
- Manager: Mohamed Ahmada
- League: Mayotte Division Honneur
Home colours

Football Club de Mtsapéré is a football club from Mtsapere, Mayotte. The club was founded on 11 February 1978. They usually play their home games in front of dozens of spectators at the 1,000-capacity Stade du Baobab.

== Honours ==
Mayotte Division Honneur

- Champions (10): 2005, 2006, 2007, 2008, 2010, 2013, 2014, 2015, 2017, 2018

Coupe de Mayotte

- Winners (8): 1981, 1983, 1985, 1991, 1993, 1995, 1996, 2017

== The club in the French football structure ==
- Coupe de France : 4 appearances

2001/02, 2004/05, 2019/20, 2020/21

== Current squad ==
Note: Flags indicate national team as defined under FIFA eligibility rules; some limited exceptions apply. Players may hold more than one non-FIFA nationality.

No.	Pos.	Nation	Player
—	GK		Abdallah Halifa
—	GK		Abdillah Sidi
—	DF		El Harissou Allaoui
—	DF		Herve Humblot
—	DF		Issouffi Oumar
—	DF		Ali Abdallah
—	DF		Souffou Boura
—	DF		Said Mohamadi
—	DF		El Had El Anrif
—	DF		Fanamana Maxime
—	MF		Faydhoini Sidi
—	MF		Ridjali Abdallah

No.	Pos.	Nation	Player
—	MF		Madi Bacari
—	MF		Bakouna Chamsidine
—	MF		Ibrahim Mohamed
—	MF		Ahamada Maoulida
—	MF		Anmiri Toibibou
—	FW		Hamada Tarmidhi
—	FW		Assani Houdhouna
—	FW		Mkadara Nourdine
—	FW		Djadid Ben Ahmed
—	FW		Mohamed Karim
—	FW		Moukhtar Hamada
—	FW		Ibrahim Chaquir
