= Mtsapere =

Settlement in Mamoudzou, Mayotte

Coordinates: 12°47′14″S 45°13′19″E

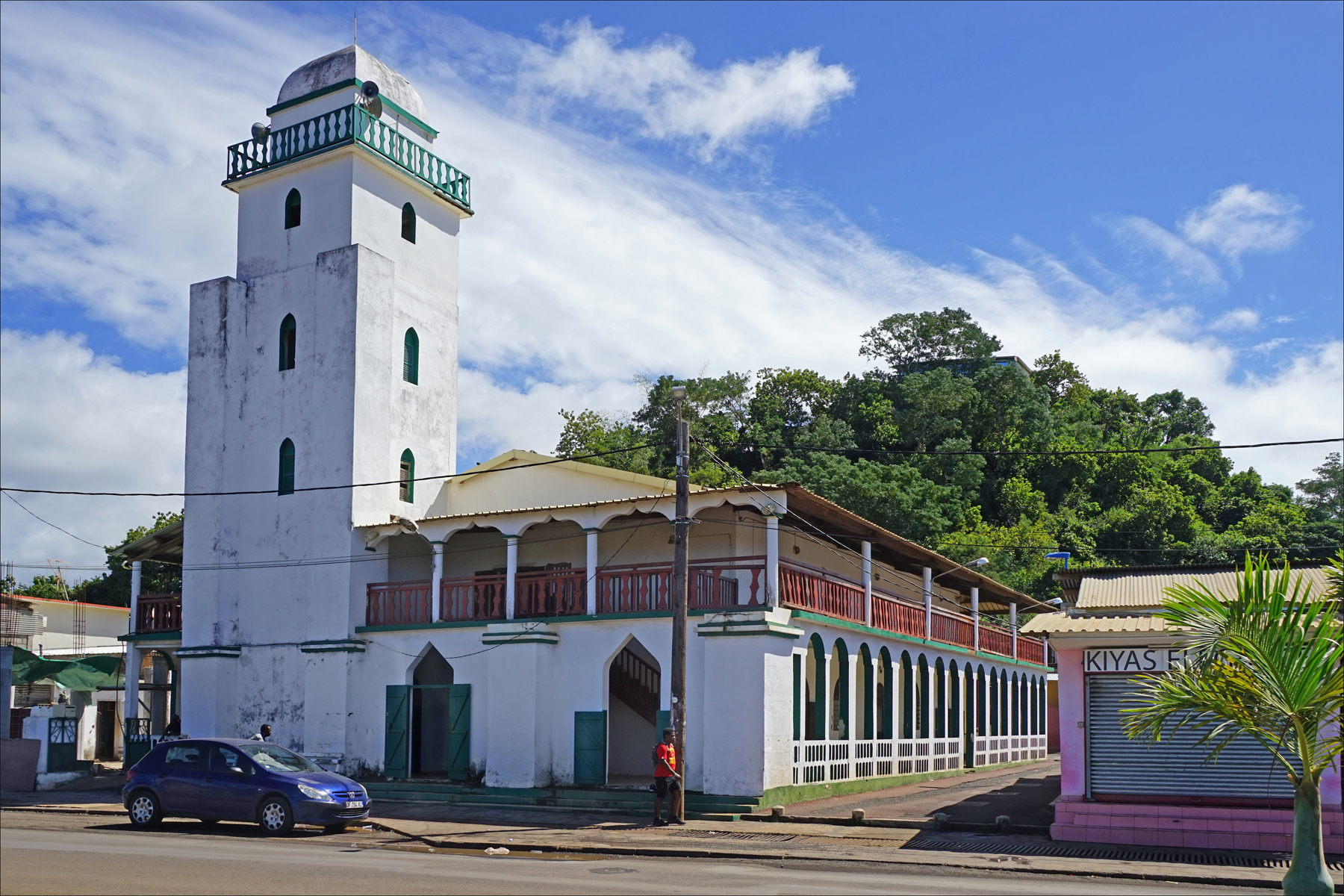
Mosque at Mtsapere

Mtsapéré (French pronunciation: [mtsapeʁe]) is a settlement in the French commune of Mamoudzou, Mayotte.
