= Foudre 2000 de Dzoumogné =

Football club

Foudre 2000 de Dzoumogné is a Mayotte football club based in Dzoumogne. It competes in the Mayotte Régional 3 North, one of the third tiers of Mayotte football.

== History ==
Competing in the fourth division of Mayotte football in 2004, Foudre 2000 achieved promotion into the Mayotte second division by 2007, taking part in the 2006–07 Coupe de France as well.

In 2016, Foudre 2000 came first place in the Mayotte Division Honneur, usurping FC Mtsapéré as the league champions and breaking their three-year streak.
