= Ligue mahoraise de football =

Governing body of football in Mayotte

- Founded: 1979
- Headquarters: Mamoudzou, Mayotte
- FIFA affiliation: N/A
- President: Boinariziki Mohamed
- Website: mayotte.fff.fr

Ligue mahoraise de football is the governing body of association football in Mayotte. It was established in 1979 and is associated with the French Football Federation. Mayotte is not a member of FIFA.
