= 2025–26 Coupe de France preliminary rounds, Nouvelle-Aquitaine =

The 2025–26 Coupe de France preliminary rounds, Nouvelle-Aquitaine was the qualifying competition to decide which teams from the leagues of the Nouvelle-Aquitaine region of France took part in the main competition from the seventh round.

A total of fifteen teams qualified from the Nouvelle-Aquitaine preliminary rounds.

In 2024-25, three teams from the region progressed to the round of 64. Fourth-tier FC Girondins de Bordeaux were defeated at home by Ligue 1 side Stade Rennais FC, sixth-tier SA Mérignac lost on penalties against Ligue 2 side Stade Lavallois, and seventh-tier FC Marmande 47, the lowest ranked side remaining in the competition, were beaten 7–0 by Le Mans FC from Championnat National.

== Draws and fixtures ==
On 29 July 2025, the league published documentation detailing the structure of the competition, and that 693 teams from the region had entered. Within these published documents were details of the first round draw; 271 ties drawn from the teams of the district league and 69 from the lowest regional division, Régional 3. The methodology for selecting Régional 3 teams for participation was by exempting those teams who performed best in the competition in the previous season. Prior to the commencement of the first round, league committee decisions resulted in the need to restructure the competition, leading to an extra team being admitted (for a total of 694) and ten ties being cancelled with the involved teams receiving byes to the second round. The second round draw, now with 197 ties, and featuring the entrance of all remaining teams from Régional 2 and lower tiers, took place on 27 August 2025.

The third round draw, featuring the entry of 33 teams from Régional 1, Championnat National 3 and A.S. Saint Pierraise, the qualifying team from Saint Pierre and Miquelon, was published on 10 September 2025. The five teams from the region at the Championnat National 2 level entered the competition at the fourth round stage, the draw for which took place on 19 September 2025. The fifth round draw was published on 1 October 2025. The sixth round draw was published on 15 October 2025.

=== First round ===
These matches were played on 22, 23 and 24 August 2025.

First Round Results: Nouvelle Aquitaine
Tie no	Home team (Tier)	Score	Away team (Tier)
1.	FC Rouillé (10)	1–2	FC Fontaine-le-Comte (8)
2.	Coqs Gauloise Limalonges (13)	1–1 (4–2 p)	ES Tonnacquoise-Lussantaise (10)
3.	US Le Dorat (11)	1–6	FC Haute Charente (10)
4.	ACG Foot Sud 86 (11)	1–3	US Chasseneuil (10)
5.	Entente Saint-Maurice-Gençay (10)	0–0 (2–4 p)	US Migné-Auxances (8)
6.	Auvézère Mayne FC (9)	4–2	US Solignac Le Vigen (10)
7.	FC Born (8)	2–3	FC Martignas-Illac (8)
8.	FC Escource (11)	2–4	AS Lamarque Arcins (12)
9.	FC Loudun (11)	1–4	AR Cherveux (12)
10.	US Pays Maixentais (9)	7–0	Union Cernay-Saint-Genest-Envigne (10)
11.	AS Périgné (11)	3–0 (Note: Tie won by means of forfeit.)	US Brion 79 (11)
12.	Saint-Romans-lès-Melle FC (12)	0–3	AS Champigny-Le Rochereau (13)
13.	AS Pouillé-Tercé (12)	1–4	US Lessac (9)
14.	Fontafie FC (11)	1–5	FC Smarves Iteuil (10)
15.	US Nantiat (11)	2–0	SC Séreilhac (11)
16.	SL Cenon-sur-Vienne (11)	1–2	AS Portugais Châtellerault (9)
17.	USA Compreignac (8)	1–1 (4–5 p)	FC Confolentais (9)
18.	AS Ingrandes-sur-Vienne (11)	1–2	AC Paizay-le-Sec (11)
19.	AS Payroux Charroux Mauprévoir (11)	3–0	US Availles-Limouzine (12)
20.	US Jaunay-Marigny (10)	0–2	AS Saint-Junien (8)
21.	Vigenal FC Limoges (10)	3–0	JS Chambon-sur-Voueize (9)
22.	US Sornac (12)	2–1	CA Peyrat-la-Nonière (9)
23.	US Auzances (9)	2–1	ES Marchoise (10)
24.	Entente Sud Monédières (10)	3–0	AS Lussat (10)
25.	AS Seilhac (10)	2–0	Saint-Germain-les-Vergnes Football (10)
26.	FC Pays Arédien (9)	4–0	FC Périgord Centre (9)
27.	Alouette FC Rive Gauche Limoges (10)	7–0	US Pays de Fénelon (10)
28.	Entente Perpezac Sadroc (10)	4–1	Amicale Saint-Hilaire Venarsal (10)
29.	FC Roullet-Saint-Estèphe (11)	1–1 (4–5 p)	ES Montignac 16 (12)
30.	US Marennaise (10)	3–0 (Note: AL Saint Brice forfeited the tie due to merging their first team with a team from a higher division.)	AL Saint-Brice (none)
31.	Val de Boutonne Foot 79 (11)	3–2	FC Charentais L'Isle-d'Espagnac (10)
32.	Aviron Boutonnais (10)	– (Note: Tie cancelled due to restructure of the competition. Both teams awarded byes to round 2.)	FCA Moron (8)
33.	SC Saint-Jean-d'Angély (9)	2–0	AS Cabariot (9)
34.	US Saujon (11)	0–5	FC Sévigné Jonzac-Saint-Germain (8)
35.	ES Bramerit (11)	0–4	CA Carbon-Blanc (10)
36.	FC Boutonnais (10)	3–1	Avenir Matha (9)
37.	AC Sud Saintonge (11)	2–3	ES Nercillac-Reparsac (11)
38.	US Aulnay (10)	0–2	Royan Vaux AFC (8)
39.	US Châteauneuf 16 (11)	2–7	FC Fontcouverte (10)
40.	Monflanquin FC (9)	3–1	FC Faux (9)
41.	US Bandiat (11)	0–2	FC Mascaret (8)
42.	US Artiguaise (10)	0–5	FC La Tour Mareuil Verteillac (8)
43.	AS Miramont-Lavergne (9)	0–3	Libourne FA 2024 (8)
44.	CA Ribéracois (8)	4–0	AS Pays de Montaigne et Gurçon (9)
45.	Entente Saint-Séverin/Palluaud (10)	1–2	FC Loubesien (8)
46.	Football Sud Bastide (10)	0–5	AS Puymoyen (8)
47.	Entente FC Cancon/US Villéreal (11)	0–7	FC Limeuil (9)
48.	ES Champniers (9)	3–6	AS Neuvic-Saint-Léon (9)
49.	FC Penne Saint-Sylvestre (11)	1–1 (5–3 p)	US Gontaud (9)
50.	FC Casteljaloux (11)	1–4	FC Roquefort Saint-Justin (9)
51.	FC Nérac en Albret (9)	3–0	AS Marcellus-Cocumont (10)
52.	US Armagnac (10)	2–2 (4–3 p)	SC Bastidienne (10)
53.	FC Labouheyre (11)	1–6	ES Eysinaise (9)
54.	CA Sainte-Hélène (9)	1–1 (6–5 p)	JS Teichoise (10)
55.	FC Parentis (11)	1–2	AS Saint-Aubin-de-Médoc (10)
56.	Élan Béarnaise Orthez (9)	1–1 (4–2 p)	FC Bassin Artiz Arthez Lacq (9)
57.	ES Bournos-Doumy-Garlède (10)	2–1	USJ Saint-Augustin Club Pyrénées Aquitaine (10)
58.	Union Saint-Jean (9)	3–0	ES Latrilloise (10)
59.	Entente Saint-Martin Geloux (10)	0–1	Pardies Olympique (10)
60.	SA Saint-Séverin (9)	–	FC La Ribère (8)
61.	JAB Pau (9)	4–1	Saint-Perdon Sports (10)
62.	AS Bidache FC (11)	1–1 (2–4 p) (Note: FC Vallée de l'Ousse penalised for fielding a suspended player, AS Bidache FC qualified.)	FC Vallée de l'Ousse (10)
63.	Chalosse FC (10)	7–2	Montesquieu FC (11)
64.	Buslaurs Thireuil (11)	0–2	ES Saint-Cerbouillé (9)
65.	ÉSB Paizay-le-Tort (12)	7–1	FC Granzay (13)
66.	SA Mauzé-Rigné (11)	8–2	US Lezay (12)
67.	ES La Pallu (10)	2–2 (5–4 p)	FC Nord 17 (11)
68.	ASPTT Bessines (10)	4–2	ASS Portugais La Rochelle (9)
69.	US Vouillé Latillé (12)	1–5	FC Pays Néo-Créchois (9)
70.	FC Saint-Jean-Missé (12)	2–2 (8–7 p)	ES Châtillon Pompaire (12)
71.	ASA Couronneries (11)	1–5	US Saint-Varent Pierregeay (9)
72.	ES Beaulieu-Breuil (10)	1–0	ES Pays Thénezéen (10)
73.	US Pexinoise Niort (11)	1–6	FC Comores Bressuire (10)
74.	US Cissé (12)	2–1	FC Pays de l'Ouin (9)
75.	SEPC Exireuil (11)	3–0	USF Pamproux (12)
76.	ASC Portugais Parthenay et de Gâtine (11)	0–3	CA Saint-Aubin-le-Cloud (9)
77.	ES Louzy (11)	4–1	ES Fayenoirterre (11)
78.	AS Saint-Martin-lès-Melle (11)	0–1	FC Autize (8)
79.	AS Poitiers Gibauderie Mahorais (11)	1–3	US Champdeniers-Pamplie (11)
80.	Aslonnes FC (13)	0–3	ES Brulain (10)
81.	SA Niort Souché (12)	0–6	US Vrère-Saint-Léger-de-Montbrun (10)
82.	CEP Poitiers (10)	1–4	US Melusine Lusignan (10)
83.	Stade Boisseuillais (11)	0–3	US Vasléenne (11)
84.	US Sammarçolles (12)	2–8	La Jarrie FC (10)
85.	US Avanton (11)	1–2	AS Coulonges-Thouarsais (11)
86.	Entente Voulmentin-Saint-Aubin-du-Plain-La Coudre (10)	0–4	FC Sud Gâtine (8)
87.	FC Canton de Courçon (10)	3–0	CS Beauvoir-sur-Niort (10)
88.	AS Quinçay (11)	0–8	Aunis AFC (8)
89.	Aigondigné FC (11)	0–3	ES Celles-Verrines (8)
90.	AS Saint-Christophe 17 (11)	3–4 (Note: Biard FC penalised for fielding an ineligible player, AS Saint-Christophe 17 qualified.)	Biard FC (11)
91.	ES Aiffres Fors Prahecq (10)	1–0	Canton Aunis FC (9)
92.	Espérance Terves (9)	3–2	Capaunis ASPTT FC (10)
93.	AS Sainte-Ouenne (12)	–	AS Pays Mellois (8)
94.	ACS Mahorais 79 (12)	2–4	FC Venise Verte (10)
95.	US Mirebeau (11)	1–2	CS Amailloux (12)
96.	Espoir Haut Vals de Saintonge (11)	1–8	SC Thouarsis (8)
97.	AS Andilly (12)	0–0 (3–5 p)	US Aigrefeuille (10)
98.	AS Saint-Léger Montbrillais (11)	0–4	ES Saint-Amand-sur-Sèvre (11)
99.	SC L'Absie-Largeasse/Moutiers-sous-Chantmerle (11)	2–1	AS Vérines (11)
100.	ACS La Rochelle (10)	3–1	FC Clazay Bocage (11)
101.	FC Pays Argentonnais (10)	1–2	FC Vouneuil-sous-Biard-Béruges (9)
102.	JS Angoulins (11)	1–3	FC Chanteloup-Courlay-Chapelle (8)
103.	Union Sud Deux-Sèvres (10)	4–1	US Vivonne (10)
104.	Bel-Air Rocs OC Poitiers (13)	2–2 (2–4 p)	FC Chiché (11)
105.	AS Breuil-Bernard (12)	0–5	AS Portugais Cerizay (10)
106.	FC Vallée du Salleron (12)	0–4	FC des 2 Vallées (10)
107.	FC Jardres (12)	0–3	FC Montamisé (9)
108.	Espérance Availles-en-Châtellerault (10)	0–2	ES Nouaillé (8)
109.	Valence-en-Poitou OC (11)	2–2 (4–3 p)	CA Saint-Victurnien (10)
110.	CS Saint-Angeau (12)	2–5	CS Naintré (8)
111.	FC Saint-Maurice/Manot (12)	3–1	Taizé-Aizie Les Adjots (12)
112.	AS Jouhet Pindray (12)	0–4	ES Nieul/Saint-Gence (9)
113.	FC Saint-Rémy-sur-Creuse (12)	1–6	AS Lussac-les-Églises (10)
114.	ES Trois Cités Poitiers (10)	5–2	AS Saint-Jouvent (10)
115.	US Champagne-Mouton (12)	0–4	ES Brion-Saint-Secondin (10)
116.	FC Saint-Priest-sous-Aixe (11)	3–1	JS Nieuil l'Espoir (8)
117.	US Veyrac (11)	5–1	US Leignes-sur-Fontaine (11)
118.	US Thuré-Besse (10)	7–1	US Leigné-sur-Usseau (11)
119.	JS Exideuil (11)	0–4	USA Condat-sur-Vienne (11)
120.	FC Canton d'Oradour-sur-Vayres (9)	1–1 (4–1 p)	ES Saint-Benoit (10)
121.	AS Saint-Saviol (11)	3–1	SC Agris (11)
122.	Chasseneuil-Saint-Georges FC (9)	1–2	ES Oyré-Dangé (10)
123.	CAS Bouresse (12)	0–1	FC Saint-Brice-sur-Vienne (10)
124.	ES Château-Larcher (8)	4–2	AS Valdivienne (9)
125.	AS Mignaloux-Beauvoir (8)	–	Antran SL (9)
126.	SS Sillars (13)	1–4	US Oradour-sur-Glane (10)
127.	US Abzac (11)	0–9	US Vicq-sur-Gartempe (9)
128.	FC Fleuré (10)	4–2 (Note: Tie reversed from original draw.)	AS Dienné (13)
129.	Amicale Coussay-les-Bois (12)	1–1 (4–2 p)	USA Bonneuil-Matours (13)
130.	AS Sèvres-Anxaumont (11)	0–3	FC Usson-Isle (8)
131.	CS Chatainais (12)	0–2	Avenir Bellac-Berneuil-Saint-Junien-les-Combes (10)
132.	Rochechouart OC (11)	2–5	AAS Saint-Julien-l'Ars (10)
133.	Mayotte FC Limoges (10)	4–1	ÉS Clugnat (11)
134.	ES La Croisille-Linards (11)	0–5	RFC Sainte-Feyre (8)
135.	ES Evaux-Budelière (9)	0–0 (1–3 p)	Occitane FC (9)
136.	AS La Jonchère-Saint-Maurice (11)	2–3	AS Eymoutiers (11)
137.	AS Saint-Sulpice-le-Guérétois (9)	2–2 (5–6 p)	CA Meymac (9)
138.	CAPO Limoges (10)	3–0	US Grand-Bourg (11)
139.	ES Bénévent-Marsac (9)	1–1 (6–5 p)	AS Turcs Ussel (9)
140.	US Saint-Fiel (9)	0–5	CA Rilhac-Rancon (8)
141.	FC Fursac (10)	0–2	FC Guéret (11)
142.	FC Saint-Martin-Terressus (12)	2–0	SC Flayat (10)
143.	US Beaune-les-Mines (11)	0–3	Foot Sud 87 (10)
144.	Espoirs La Geneytouse (10)	5–0	SA Le Palais-sur-Vienne (10)
145.	Boisseuil FC (11)	0–0 (5–4 p)	US Bugeacoise (12)
146.	AS Ambazac (9)	3–1	US Saint-Vaury (10)
147.	SC Sardent (10)	3–1	ES Soursac (10)
148.	USS Mérinchal (9)	0–1	FC Neuvic (11)
149.	US Versillacoise (9)	1–1 (3–1 p)	ES Ussel (8)
150.	ES Ahunoise (10)	0–7	USC Bourganeuf (8)
151.	US Felletin (10)	2–1	AS Marcillac Clergoux (10)
152.	FC Sauviat-sur-Vige (11)	1–0	FC Montaignac-Rosiers (11)
153.	FC Saint-Paul-la-Roche (11)	0–4	SS Sainte-Féréole (10)
154.	AS Champcevinel (9)	6–0	Allassac Saint-Viance FC (10)
155.	US Jumilhacoise (11)	0–4	FC Cornilois-Fortunadais (9)
156.	Entente Marquay Tamnies (11)	0–3	Beynat Lanteuil FC (9)
157.	ES Périgord Vert (10)	0–1	Terrasson FC (10)
158.	Causse Périgord FC (12)	0–4	ASPO Brive (10)
159.	US Saint-Clementoise (10)	2–1	FC Saint-Jal (11)
160.	FC Atur (10)	9–1	AS Meyssac (11)
161.	Entente Périgord Noir (11)	1–4	Rouffignac OC (10)
162.	US Marsaneix (11)	1–4	ES Montignacoise (9)
163.	US Limoges Bastide (10)	7–4	ASV Malemort (9)
164.	US La Roche l'Abeille (11)	2–3	AS Aiguille Bosmie Charroux (11)
165.	Entente des Barrages de la Xaintrie (11)	0–3	Olympique Larche Lafeuillade (10)
166.	Entente SR3V (8)	4–0	FC Argentat (9)
167.	AS Nexon (9)	6–1	FC Excideuil Saint-Médard (10)
168.	Condat FC (11)	3–4	Périgueux Foot (9)
169.	FC Bassillac Milhac (11)	0–1	USF Valeine Albussac Neuville (11)
170.	AS Mercoeur (11)	–	FC Thenon-Limeyrat-Fossemagne (8)
171.	US Feuillardiers (11)	0–3	Limoges Landouge (9)
172.	FC Saint-Geniès (11)	2–3	Cosnac FC (9)
173.	Entente Troche-Vigeois (11)	0–2	SA Sanilhacois (8)
174.	FC Ambès (10)	6–1	Stade Blayais (10)
175.	Coqs Rouges Mansle (11)	1–5	FC Essouvert Loulay (10)
176.	Entente Soubise Port-des-Barques (10)	4–2	US La Gémoze (10)
177.	ES Ambares (11)	7–1	FC Cubzac-les-Ponts (12)
178.	FC Vallée de l'Aria (11)	2–4	FC Sud 17 (8)
179.	AS Mosnac (12)	0–4	UAS Verdille (10)
180.	US Balzac (12)	1–5	Croissant d'Or Luxe (12)
181.	ÉS Bourcefranc-le-Chapus (11)	8–1	AS Salles d'Angles (12)
182.	CF Crouin (11)	2–2 (4–5 p)	AS Saint-Yrieix (8)
183.	Entente Retaud-Chermignac (12)	1–8	ES Thénacaise (10)
184.	ÉS Clussais (12)	0–2	US Saint-Genis (10)
185.	UC Antenne (11)	2–1	AS Vœuil-et-Giget (11)
186.	EFC Vallée du Coran (11)	0–5	US Pons (9)
187.	USA Sauzéen (12)	0–3	AS Aigre (10)
188.	AS Pugnac (10)	4–2	ES Saintes (9)
189.	FC Saint-Cybardeaux (11)	0–2	ASFC Vindelle (8)
190.	AS Merpins (10)	9–0	FC Gauriaguet-Peujard (12)
191.	AS Breuillet (10)	0–7	SC Mouthiers (8)
192.	FC Rouillac (11)	3–3 (3–4 p)	AS Chadenac Jarnac Marignac (11)
193.	Saint-Hilaire FC (11)	5–1	SC Bédenac Laruscade (11)
194.	Saint-Porchaire-Corme Royal FC (11)	5–0	US Meursac (11)
195.	FC Canton Mirambeau (11)	0–11	FC Seudre Océan (9)
196.	CO La Couronne (9)	0–6	Ile d’Oléron Football (9)
197.	FC Fouras-Saint-Laurent (11)	2–0	CS Saint-Michel-sur-Charente (9)
198.	CS Trizay-Beurlay (10)	3–6	JS Grande Champagne (8)
199.	Arvert Foot (12)	0–6	FC Cubnezais (10)
200.	LA Genté (11)	1–0	SL Châteaubernard (11)
201.	FC Belvès (11)	–	US Coutras (8)
202.	FC Pays Beaumontois (10)	0–1	Les Aiglons Razacois (11)
203.	US Bouëx (11)	0–3	ASC Mayotte Angoulême (11)
204.	AS Gensac-Montcaret (10)	1–1 (3–4 p)	US Anais (11)
205.	AS Bel-Air (10)	6–3	Campagnac Daglan Saint-Laurent Foot (11)
206.	FC Saint-Paul-Lizonne (12)	0–4	UFC Saint-Colomb-de-Lauzun (9)
207.	AS Coursac (11)	0–2	ES Fronsadaise (10)
208.	Cours-de-Pile-Monbazillac FC (11)	0–5	US La Catte (8)
209.	FCO Eymet (11)	2–3	Athletic 89 FC (9)
210.	SJ Bergerac (10)	–	CO Coulouniex-Chamiers (8)
211.	Gué de Sénac FC (12)	0–2	US Mussidan-Saint Medard (9)
212.	US Saint-Denis-de-Pile (9)	–	JS Basseau Angoulême (8)
213.	GS Franco-Portugais Gond-Pontouvre (10)	2–3	AS Brie (9)
214.	FLR Le Monteil (10)	1–1 (4–2 p)	JS Garat-Sers Vouzan (11)
215.	AS Soyaux (9)	2–0	USA Montbron (9)
216.	JS Douzillac Saint-Louis (11)	0–4	Limens JSA (8)
217.	FC Le Bugue Vézère (12)	0–4	ES Mornac (10)
218.	US Tocane-Saint-Apre (9)	2–0	Union Saint-Médard Petit-Palais (10)
219.	Abzac US 33 (12)	1–5	AS Castillonnès Cahuzac Lalande (10)
220.	Pays de l'Eyraud (10)	2–2 (5–4 p)	US Annesse-et-Beaulieu (10)
221.	AC Gond-Pontouvre (10)	2–2 (4–2 p)	AS Nontron-Saint-Pardoux (8)
222.	AS Beautiran FC (12)	0–6	CM Floirac (10)
223.	Mas AC (8)	4–2	FC Pays Aurossais (8)
224.	SC Monségur (10)	0–3	Bordeaux Étudiants CF (9)
225.	SC Saint-Symphorien (9)	3–1	Tonneins FC (10)
226.	AS Sauveterrienne (11)	0–1	US Virazeil-Puymiclan (9)
227.	SC Astaffortais (10)	0–2	AF Casseneuil-Pailloles-Lédat (8)
228.	Labrit Forest FC (11)	2–4	FC Gironde La Réole (10)
229.	AS Villandraut-Préchac (11)	0–1	Fraternelle Landiras (10)
230.	OS Agenais (10)	4–0	AS Livradaise (11)
231.	FC Communes de Créonnais (10)	3–3 (5–6 p)	FC Roquefortais (11)
232.	FC Bords de Garonne (10)	1–1 (3–1 p)	CA Béglais (8)
233.	US Bazeillaise (11)	1–3	ES Mazères-Roaillan (11)
234.	CS Portugais Villenave-d'Ornon (9)	2–2 (3–5 p)	AS Laugnac (9)
235.	US Lamothe-Mongauzy (10)	1–4	US Fargues Toulenne (10)
236.	Sud Gironde FC (8)	2–2 (2–4 p)	FC Vallée du Lot (9)
237.	FC Vallée de la Dordogne (10)	1–2	FC des Deux Leyres (9)
238.	Landes Girondines FC (11)	–	ES Blanquefort (7)
239.	CMS Haut Médoc (11)	0–1	AS Avensan Moulis Listrac (11)
240.	ES Bruges (9)	1–4	Saint-Seurin Saint-Estèphe FC (10)
241.	Parempuyre FC (11)	1–0	Haillan Foot 33 (8)
242.	US Beychevelle (12)	0–2	CA Sallois (8)
243.	US Saint-Germain-d'Esteuil (11)	0–3	AG Vendays-Montalivet (9)
244.	AS Montferrandaise (11)	2–4	SJ Macaudaise (9)
245.	Union Pauillac Saint-Laurent (11)	0–3	SC Cadaujac (8)
246.	Castelnau FC (12)	0–13	AGJA Caudéran (9)
247.	FC Gradignan (11)	2–7	ES Meillon-Assat-Narcastet (8)
248.	AS Cazères (10)	1–3	FC Oloronais (8)
249.	Carresse Salies FC (10)	1–1 (4–1 p)	SA Mauléonais (8)
250.	APIS en Aquitaine (11)	1–6	USC Léognan (9)
251.	Entente Haut Béarn (11)	1–4	FC Saint-Vincent-de-Paul (8)
252.	Kanboko Izarra (11)	0–4	Violette Aturine (9)
253.	Bordeaux AC (11)	0–3	FA Morlaàs Est Béarn (9)
254.	Elan Boucalais (8)	1–0	AS Pontonx (9)
255.	US Castétis-Gouze (10)	4–3	Ardanavy FC (11)
256.	RC Dax (11)	1–3 (Note: FC Luy de Béarn penalised for fielding a suspended player, RC Dax qualified.)	FC Luy de Béarn (9)
257.	FC Lons (10)	2–4	JA Dax (9)
258.	Stade Navarrais (11)	2–2 (5–4 p)	Papillons de Pontacq (10)
259.	FA Bourbaki Pau (10)	1–1 (0–3 p)	Union Jurançonnaise (8)
260.	JS Laluque-Rion (10)	2–2 (5–3 p)	AS des Églantines de Hendaye (10)
261.	FC Pierroton Cestas Toctoucau (11)	0–3	Stade Pessacais UC (9)
262.	Étoile Béarnaise FC (12)	0–2	FC Saint-Martin-de-Seignanx (8)
263.	Stade Ygossais (8)	–	Association Saint-Laurent Billère (9)
264.	SC Taron Sévignacq (10)	1–4	Labenne OSC (9)
265.	US Portugais Pau (8)	6–0	FC Barpais (9)
266.	ES Canéjan (10)	0–0 (4–2 p)	FC Saint-Geours (8)
267.	FC Hagetmautien (8)	2–3	US Saint-Palais Amikuze (9)
268.	Monein FC (11)	3–0	AS Maurrin (10)
269.	FC des Enclaves et du Plateau (10)	5–3	FC Belin-Béliet (8)
270.	Espérance Oeyreluy (11)	2–6	FC Lacajunte-Tursan (9)
271.	AL Poey-de-Lescar (8)	8–0	Peyrehorade SF (9)

=== Second round ===
These matches were played on 30 and 31 August 2025, with two rescheduled and played on 7 September 2025.

Second Round Results: Nouvelle Aquitaine
Tie no	Home team (Tier)	Score	Away team (Tier)
1.	Stade Saint-Médardais (7)	3–0	US Cenon (7)
2.	CA Sainte-Hélène (9)	1–1 (4–2 p)	FC Cœur Médoc Atlantique (7)
3.	Labenne OSC (9)	0–1	US Saint-Palais Amikuze (9)
4.	JA Dax (9)	3–0	ES Audenge (7)
5.	Bergerac Périgord FC (8)	4–0	FC Pessac Alouette (7)
6.	UFC Saint-Colomb-de-Lauzun (9)	3–6	RC Bordeaux (8)
7.	Union Saint-Bruno (7)	2–1	RC Chambéry (8)
8.	AS Payroux Charroux Mauprévoir (11)	2–8	CA Saint-Aubin-le-Cloud (9)
9.	AS Soyaux (9)	1–1 (2–3 p)	US Bessines-Morterolles (8)
10.	UAS Verdille (10)	3–0	ES La Rochelle (7)
11.	FC Airvo Saint-Jouin (8)	3–2	SA Moncoutant (8)
12.	US Migné-Auxances (8)	0–5	Gati-Foot (8)
13.	Saint-Palais SF (8)	4–2	FC Estuaire Haute Gironde (8)
14.	AS Saint-Aubin-de-Médoc (10)	0–7	US Bouscataise (7)
15.	AS Chadenac Jarnac Marignac (11)	1–1 (4–5 p)	Saint-Hilaire FC (11)
16.	JS Grande Champagne (8)	3–1	AS Cozes (7)
17.	AG Vendays-Montalivet (9)	0–3	ES Thénacaise (10)
18.	Royan Vaux AFC (8)	1–4	FC Arsac-Pian Médoc (7)
19.	FC Fontcouverte (10)	1–2	FC Médoc Océan (8)
20.	US Saint-Genis (10)	0–3	AS Le Taillan (8)
21.	AS Tarnos (7)	2–4	Andernos Sport FC (7)
22.	FC Saint-Vincent-de-Paul (8)	0–1	Biscarrosse OFC (7)
23.	Cazaux Olympique (8)	1–0	Élan Béarnaise Orthez (9)
24.	Seignosse-Capbreton-Soustons FC (7)	2–0	Les Labourdins d'Ustaritz (8)
25.	JS Laluque-Rion (10)	0–8	Croisés Saint-André Bayonne (7)
26.	Violette Aturine (9)	3–1	FC des Enclaves et du Plateau (10)
27.	FC Oloronais (8)	4–1	SA Saint-Séverin (9)
28.	JAB Pau (9)	5–0	ES Bournos-Doumy-Garlède (10)
29.	US Armagnac (10)	2–4	US Marsan (8)
30.	FC Roquefort Saint-Justin (9)	0–2	SC Saint-Pierre-du-Mont (8)
31.	FC Penne Saint-Sylvestre (11)	2–2 (5–3 p)	ASSA Pays du Dropt (8)
32.	FC Nérac en Albret (9)	1–3	FLR Le Monteil (10)
33.	FC Martignas-Illac (8)	3–2	Coqs Rouges Bordeaux (8)
34.	US Vasléenne (11)	1–5	FC Autize (8)
35.	CS Amailloux (12)	2–2 (5–6 p)	AR Cherveux (12)
36.	FC Smarves Iteuil (10)	0–0 (2–3 p)	ES Celles-Verrines (8)
37.	FC Grand Saint-Emilionnais (7)	4–1	US Coutras (8)
38.	JS Sireuil (7)	1–1 (4–2 p)	FCA Moron (8)
39.	SC Mouthiers (8)	4–1	CA Ribéracois (8)
40.	Périgueux Foot (9)	0–2	CO Coulouniex-Chamiers (8)
41.	Alouette FC Rive Gauche Limoges (10)	2–2 (5–4 p)	CS Leroy Angoulême (7)
42.	FC Boutonnais (10)	2–0	FC Réthais (8)
43.	Val de Boutonne Foot 79 (11)	2–5	US Marennaise (10)
44.	AAAM Laleu-La Pallice (8)	1–1 (3–1 p)	UA Niort Saint-Florent (7)
45.	ES Montignac 16 (12)	0–1	FC Fouras-Saint-Laurent (11)
46.	Aviron Boutonnais (10)	0–4	OL Saint-Liguaire Niort (7)
47.	US Aigrefeuille (10)	1–2	Ile d’Oléron Football (9)
48.	FC Confolentais (9)	1–1 (3–4 p)	FC Charente Limousine (7)
49.	FC 3 Vallées 86 (7)	2–0	Avenir Nord Foot 87 (8)
50.	US Chasseneuil (10)	3–2	ES Trois Cités Poitiers (10)
51.	Avenir Bellac-Berneuil-Saint-Junien-les-Combes (10)	0–5	OFC Ruelle (8)
52.	FC Limeuil (9)	4–3	Auvézère Mayne FC (9)
53.	FC Pays Arédien (9)	3–2	Entente Perpezac Sadroc (10)
54.	Beynat Lanteuil FC (9)	1–3	ES Nonards Altillac (8)
55.	AS Jugeals-Noailles (7)	2–1	FC Thenon-Limeyrat-Fossemagne (8)
56.	AS Seilhac (10)	0–9	JA Isle (7)
57.	Entente Sud Monédières (10)	1–3	AS Aixoise (7)
58.	FC Cornilois-Fortunadais (9)	1–0	SC Verneuil-sur-Vienne (8)
59.	CA Meymac (9)	0–2	ES Guérétoise (7)
60.	US Auzances (9)	2–1	CS Boussac (8)
61.	Saint-Porchaire-Corme Royal FC (11)	0–1	Parempuyre FC (11)
62.	Chalosse FC (10)	2–1	RC Dax (11)
63.	ES Nercillac-Reparsac (11)	0–3	ES Eysinaise (9)
64.	FC Seudre Océan (9)	3–1	SJ Macaudaise (9)
65.	AS Lamarque Arcins (12)	3–8	Union Saint-Jean (9)
66.	AS Merpins (10)	2–0	LA Genté (11)
67.	Saint-Seurin Saint-Estèphe FC (10)	0–2	Alliance Foot 3B (7)
68.	US Pons (9)	1–1 (6–5 p)	UA Cognac (8)
69.	FC Sud 17 (8)	1–1 (3–4 p)	ES Blanquefort (7)
70.	AS Avensan Moulis Listrac (11)	0–7	FC Sévigné Jonzac-Saint-Germain (8)
71.	Elan Boucalais (8)	2–1	Hasparren FC (8)
72.	CA Sallois (8)	0–0 (2–3 p)	JA Biarritz (8)
73.	FC Saint-Martin-de-Seignanx (8)	3–2	FC Tartas Saint-Yaguen (7)
74.	Stade Navarrais (11)	1–1 (3–4 p)	CS Lantonnais (8)
75.	Carresse Salies FC (10)	1–3	Stade Ygossais (8)
76.	Landes Girondines FC (11)	1–8	Hiriburuko Ainhara (7)
77.	Union Jurançonnaise (8)	0–1	FC Lescar (7)
78.	AL Poey-de-Lescar (8)	2–0	FC Doazit (7)
79.	Monein FC (11)	1–1 (13–12 p)	FC Lacajunte-Tursan (9)
80.	FC Artiguelouve-Arbus-Aubertin (8)	1–3	Bleuets Pau (8)
81.	Fraternelle Landiras (10)	1–3	US Portugais Pau (8)
82.	ES Mazères-Roaillan (11)	1–1 (3–5 p)	Association Saint-Laurent Billère (9)
83.	Stade Montois (7)	1–0	Avenir Mourenxois (8)
84.	SC Saint-Symphorien (9)	1–2	ES Montoise (7)
85.	Pardies Olympique (10)	2–1	US Fargues Toulenne (10)
86.	FC des Deux Leyres (9)	0–2	Patronage Bazadais (7)
87.	US Castétis-Gouze (10)	0–2	ES Meillon-Assat-Narcastet (8)
88.	ES Nay-Vath-Vielha (8)	0–2	FC La Ribère (8)
89.	AS Castillonnès Cahuzac Lalande (10)	1–8	US La Catte (8)
90.	Stade Pessacais UC (9)	2–0	Monflanquin FC (9)
91.	Bordeaux Étudiants CF (9)	5–1	Pays de l'Eyraud (10)
92.	FC Talence (7)	0–2	FC Côteaux Pécharmant (8)
93.	FC Roquefortais (11)	1–1 (5–4 p)	AF Casseneuil-Pailloles-Lédat (8)
94.	Targon-Soulignac FC (8)	2–0	Confluent Football 47 (8)
95.	US Virazeil-Puymiclan (9)	2–2 (2–4 p)	FC Rive Droite 33 (8)
96.	La Brède FC (7)	7–1	CA Castets-en-Dorthe (8)
97.	SJ Bergerac (10)	0–1 (Note: Prigonrieux FC penalised for fielding a suspended player, SJ Bergerac qualified.)	Prigonrieux FC (7)
98.	ES Canéjan (10)	5–0	CM Floirac (10)
99.	AS Laugnac (9)	0–1	SC Cadaujac (8)
100.	FC Vallée du Lot (9)	2–0	FC Porte d'Aquitaine 47 (7)
101.	OS Agenais (10)	3–3 (4–5 p)	FC des Graves (7)
102.	AGJA Caudéran (9)	0–2	FC Bords de Garonne (10)
103.	USC Léognan (9)	1–1 (3–2 p)	FC Gironde La Réole (10)
104.	Mas AC (8)	7–3	FC des Portes de l'Entre-Deux-Mers (7)
105.	CA Carbon-Blanc (10)	1–1 (5–3 p)	SU Agen (7)
106.	FC Vouneuil-sous-Biard-Béruges (9)	2–0	US Pays Maixentais (9)
107.	US Melusine Lusignan (10)	1–3	SEPC Exireuil (11)
108.	Valence-en-Poitou OC (11)	1–3	FC Fontaine-le-Comte (8)
109.	ASPTT Bessines (10)	1–1 (3–5 p)	ES Château-Larcher (8)
110.	FC Venise Verte (10)	8–1	FC Sud Gâtine (8)
111.	AS Aigre (10)	4–2	AS Périgné (11)
112.	FC Pays Néo-Créchois (9)	1–1 (5–4 p)	AS Échiré Saint-Gelais (8)
113.	AS Sainte-Ouenne (12)	2–0	ÉSB Paizay-le-Tort (12)
114.	Croissant d'Or Luxe (12)	1–4	Stade Ruffec (7)
115.	US Champdeniers-Pamplie (11)	0–2	SC L'Absie-Largeasse/Moutiers-sous-Chantmerle (11)
116.	AS Puymoyen (8)	1–3	AS Neuvic-Saint-Léon (9)
117.	AS Pugnac (10)	0–8	Libourne FA 2024 (8)
118.	AS Bel-Air (10)	2–2 (5–4 p)	ES Ambares (11)
119.	FC Loubesien (8)	4–1	AS Saint-Yrieix (8)
120.	FC Cubnezais (10)	1–4	US Lormont (6)
121.	Athletic 89 FC (9)	2–1	FC Saint André-de-Cubzac (7)
122.	US Saint-Denis-de-Pile (9)	2–6	FC Côteaux Libournais (7)
123.	US Mussidan-Saint Medard (9)	3–2	FC Ambès (10)
124.	ES Fronsadaise (10)	1–5	Montpon-Ménesplet FC (8)
125.	AC Gond-Pontouvre (10)	1–4	ES Linars (8)
126.	FC Mascaret (8)	2–1	US Nord Gironde (8)
127.	Limens JSA (8)	2–2 (3–5 p)	CMO Bassens (7)
128.	FC Atur (10)	0–2	US Saint-Léonard-de-Noblat (8)
129.	AS Champcevinel (9)	0–1	JS Basseau Angoulême (8)
130.	AS Ambazac (9)	0–3	USE Couzeix-Chaptelat (7)
131.	FC Sauviat-sur-Vige (11)	0–5	JS Lafarge Limoges (8)
132.	US Veyrac (11)	2–3	AS Brie (9)
133.	US Tocane-Saint-Apre (9)	1–4	US Chancelade/Marsac (8)
134.	ASC Mayotte Angoulême (11)	2–4	Vigenal FC Limoges (10)
135.	Les Aiglons Razacois (11)	0–2	ES Mornac (10)
136.	AS Eymoutiers (11)	1–1 (3–4 p)	US Anais (11)
137.	Espoirs La Geneytouse (10)	1–6	La Roche/Rivières FC Tardoire (7)
138.	FC La Tour Mareuil Verteillac (8)	1–4	CA Rilhac-Rancon (8)
139.	FC Saint-Martin-Terressus (12)	0–0 (2–4 p)	SA Sanilhacois (8)
140.	Union Sud Deux-Sèvres (10)	2–1	AS Pays Mellois (8)
141.	ES Aiffres Fors Prahecq (10)	1–2	Étoile Maritime FC (7)
142.	Coqs Gauloise Limalonges (13)	0–5	FC Canton de Courçon (10)
143.	ES Brulain (10)	0–2	Avenir 79 FC (7)
144.	UC Antenne (11)	1–2	AS Maritime (8)
145.	FC Essouvert Loulay (10)	1–11	DR Boucholeurs-Châtelaillon-Yves (7)
146.	La Jarrie FC (10)	4–2	Aunis AFC (8)
147.	ÉS Bourcefranc-le-Chapus (11)	2–3	FC Dompierre-Sainte-Soulle (7)
148.	Entente Soubise Port-des-Barques (10)	1–3	ASFC Vindelle (8)
149.	ACS La Rochelle (10)	1–1 (4–2 p)	SC Saint-Jean-d'Angély (9)
150.	AS Champigny-Le Rochereau (13)	0–4	ES Saint-Amand-sur-Sèvre (11)
151.	AS Portugais Cerizay (10)	0–6	SC Thouarsis (8)
152.	US Cissé (12)	2–2 (4–3 p)	ES Louzy (11)
153.	ES Aubinrorthais (8)	2–1	EF Le Tallud (8)
154.	Amicale Coussay-les-Bois (12)	0–18	Ozon FC (7)
155.	AS Portugais Châtellerault (9)	1–1 (4–3 p)	FC Chanteloup-Courlay-Chapelle (8)
156.	US Vrère-Saint-Léger-de-Montbrun (10)	0–7	CO Cerizay (7)
157.	ES La Pallu (10)	1–2	Inter Bocage FC (8)
158.	FC Chiché (11)	1–1 (2–4 p)	SA Mauzé-Rigné (11)
159.	FC Saint-Jean-Missé (12)	0–5	ES Beaulieu-Breuil (10)
160.	AS Saint-Christophe 17 (11)	1–1 (3–0 p)	US Saint-Varent Pierregeay (9)
161.	ES Beaumont-Saint-Cyr (7)	0–1	US Saint-Sauveur (8)
162.	FC Comores Bressuire (10)	1–0	Espérance Terves (9)
163.	US Thuré-Besse (10)	1–1 (6–5 p)	Antran SL (9)
164.	FC Montamisé (9)	2–3	ES Oyré-Dangé (10)
165.	AS Coulonges-Thouarsais (11)	1–2	ES Saint-Cerbouillé (9)
166.	US Nantiat (11)	0–1	US Vicq-sur-Gartempe (9)
167.	FC Saint-Maurice/Manot (12)	0–10	FC Usson-Isle (8)
168.	AC Paizay-le-Sec (11)	1–1 (7–6 p)	ES Brion-Saint-Secondin (10)
169.	AAS Saint-Julien-l'Ars (10)	2–1	AS Lussac-les-Églises (10)
170.	US Oradour-sur-Glane (10)	2–2 (3–4 p)	ES Nouaillé (8)
171.	AS Mignaloux-Beauvoir (8)	4–0	ES Nieul/Saint-Gence (9)
172.	FC Fleuré (10)	0–4	UES Montmorillon (7)
173.	FC Haute Charente (10)	4–3	CA Saint-Savin-Saint-Germain (7)
174.	USF Valeine Albussac Neuville (11)	0–4	Entente SR3V (8)
175.	Olympique Larche Lafeuillade (10)	2–0	SS Sainte-Féréole (10)
176.	AS Mercoeur (11)	2–1	Boisseuil FC (11)
177.	USA Condat-sur-Vienne (11)	0–3 (Note: FC Sarlat-Marcillac penalised for fielding a suspended player, USA Condat-sur-Vienne qualified.)	FC Sarlat-Marcillac (8)
178.	AS Aiguille Bosmie Charroux (11)	1–4	Cosnac FC (9)
179.	ASPO Brive (10)	1–2	AS Saint-Pantaleon (7)
180.	FC Belvès (11)	0–5	US Donzenac (8)
181.	Occitane FC (9)	1–1 (3–4 p)	Rouffignac OC (10)
182.	ES Montignacoise (9)	2–2 (4–3 p)	AS Nexon (9)
183.	ES Bénévent-Marsac (9)	0–1	Tulle Football Corrèze (7)
184.	FC Guéret (11)	2–1	FC Saint-Priest-sous-Aixe (11)
185.	FC des 2 Vallées (10)	0–4	EF Aubussonnais (7)
186.	SC Sardent (10)	1–2	AS Saint-Junien (8)
187.	Mayotte FC Limoges (10)	1–1 (8–7 p)	Limoges Landouge (9)
188.	CAPO Limoges (10)	0–1	USC Bourganeuf (8)
189.	FC Saint-Brice-sur-Vienne (10)	3–0	US Felletin (10)
190.	US Saint-Clementoise (10)	0–3	AS Gouzon (7)
191.	FC Neuvic (11)	2–2 (6–5 p)	US Sornac (12)
192.	US Limoges Bastide (10)	2–0	RFC Sainte-Feyre (8)
193.	Terrasson FC (10)	1–1 (2–4 p)	Foot Sud 87 (10)
194.	AS Bidache FC (11)	1–4	FA Morlaàs Est Béarn (9)
195.	US Lessac (9)	0–3	CS Naintré (8)
196.	AS Saint-Saviol (11)	0–2 (Note: Original match postponed due to an unplayable pitch. Rearranged for 7 September 2025.)	La Ligugéenne Football (7)
197.	US Versillacoise (9)	0–1	FC Canton d'Oradour-sur-Vayres (9)

=== Third round ===
These matches were played on 13 and 14 September 2025.

Third Round Results: Nouvelle Aquitaine
Tie no	Home team (Tier)	Score	Away team (Tier)
1.	Vigenal FC Limoges (10)	5–0	ES Montignacoise (9)
2.	EF Aubussonnais (7)	0–0 (4–1 p)	Entente SR3V (8)
3.	FC Lescar (7)	2–0	Mas AC (8)
4.	Hiriburuko Ainhara (7)	2–2 (3–5 p)	Andernos Sport FC (7)
5.	JA Biarritz (8)	0–3	SA Mérignac (6)
6.	FC Autize (8)	0–1	La Roche/Rivières FC Tardoire (7)
7.	ES Mornac (10)	6–2	AS Merpins (10)
8.	OFC Ruelle (8)	3–1	FC Seudre Océan (9)
9.	FC Rive Droite 33 (8)	1–0	Violette Aturine (9)
10.	US Saint-Léonard-de-Noblat (8)	1–3	ESA Brive (6)
11.	Tulle Football Corrèze (7)	1–1 (4–3 p)	USE Couzeix-Chaptelat (7)
12.	Alouette FC Rive Gauche Limoges (10)	1–5	AS Panazol (5)
13.	AS Gouzon (7)	1–0	AS Saint-Junien (8)
14.	US Auzances (9)	3–0	FC Saint-Brice-sur-Vienne (10)
15.	FA Morlaàs Est Béarn (9)	1–0	FC La Ribère (8)
16.	FC Penne Saint-Sylvestre (11)	0–3	Union Saint-Bruno (7)
17.	FC Bords de Garonne (10)	0–0 (5–4 p)	Stade Saint-Médardais (7)
18.	Union Saint-Jean (9)	0–0 (3–2 p)	ES Montoise (7)
19.	Stade Bordelais (6)	0–0 (4–3 p)	SAG Cestas (5)
20.	JAB Pau (9)	1–4	AS Mazères-Uzos-Rontignon (6)
21.	Libourne FA 2024 (8)	2–0	FC Côteaux Libournais (7)
22.	Bleuets Pau (8)	2–4	Entente Boé Bon-Encontre (6)
23.	Cazaux Olympique (8)	1–4	Saint-Paul Sport (6)
24.	Biscarrosse OFC (7)	4–0	FC Saint-Martin-de-Seignanx (8)
25.	FC Bassin d'Arcachon (5)	3–1	Les Genêts d'Anglet (5)
26.	FC Martignas-Illac (8)	1–4	Arin Luzien (6)
27.	FC Oloronais (8)	0–3	FC Biganos (6)
28.	FC Médoc Océan (8)	7–1	US Pons (9)
29.	ES Blanquefort (7)	1–1 (4–2 p)	FC Grand Saint-Emilionnais (7)
30.	FC des Graves (7)	2–1	CMO Bassens (7)
31.	FCE Mérignac Arlac (6)	1–1 (3–4 p)	FC Saint-Médard-en-Jalles (6)
32.	FC Arsac-Pian Médoc (7)	2–1	A.S. Saint Pierraise (Saint Pierre and Miquelon)
33.	ES Thénacaise (10)	2–2 (8–7 p)	CA Sainte-Hélène (9)
34.	US Marennaise (10)	0–4	SC Mouthiers (8)
35.	ES Oyré-Dangé (10)	1–0 (Note: The match was abandoned after 85 minutes, due to the referee feeling threatened. ES Oyré-Dangé led 1–0 at the time. The situation was referred to the disciplinary committee of the league, who ruled that FC Comores Bressuire were penalised, and ES Oyré-Dangé qualified.)	FC Comores Bressuire (10)
36.	FC Bressuire (6)	2–3	ES Buxerolles (6)
37.	ES Nouaillé (8)	1–4	CO Cerizay (7)
38.	Gati-Foot (8)	2–2 (4–5 p)	AS Mignaloux-Beauvoir (8)
39.	UAS Verdille (10)	1–1 (4–3 p)	FC Charente Limousine (7)
40.	FC Boutonnais (10)	3–1	FC Pays Néo-Créchois (9)
41.	US Anais (11)	4–1	AS Sainte-Ouenne (12)
42.	Stade Ruffec (7)	2–1	DR Boucholeurs-Châtelaillon-Yves (7)
43.	SA Sanilhacois (8)	1–3	ES Linars (8)
44.	JS Basseau Angoulême (8)	0–2	JS Sireuil (7)
45.	Ile d’Oléron Football (9)	1–8	Trélissac-Antonne Périgord FC (6)
46.	Rouffignac OC (10)	4–4 (4–2 p)	US Chancelade/Marsac (8)
47.	CO Coulouniex-Chamiers (8)	1–3	Rochefort FC (6)
48.	FC Cornilois-Fortunadais (9)	4–0	Mayotte FC Limoges (10)
49.	AS Saint-Pantaleon (7)	1–2	Limoges Football (6)
50.	JS Lafarge Limoges (8)	1–1 (1–3 p)	ES Guérétoise (7)
51.	US Donzenac (8)	0–1	CA Rilhac-Rancon (8)
52.	FC Pays Arédien (9)	0–2	AS Aixoise (7)
53.	USC Bourganeuf (8)	2–5	AS Jugeals-Noailles (7)
54.	US Mussidan-Saint Medard (9)	1–1 (5–3 p)	US Lormont (6)
55.	CA Carbon-Blanc (10)	1–1 (4–5 p)	Bergerac Périgord FC (8)
56.	AS Le Taillan (8)	1–2	Jeunesse Villenave (6)
57.	Montpon-Ménesplet FC (8)	1–1 (2–4 p)	Athletic 89 FC (9)
58.	Alliance Foot 3B (7)	4–0	FC Loubesien (8)
59.	Parempuyre FC (11)	2–0	ES Eysinaise (9)
60.	Stade Pessacais UC (9)	4–1	Bordeaux Étudiants CF (9)
61.	OL Saint-Liguaire Niort (7)	1–1 (4–5 p)	FC Périgny (6)
62.	La Jarrie FC (10)	1–2	ES Château-Larcher (8)
63.	FC Haute Charente (10)	1–3	AAAM Laleu-La Pallice (8)
64.	AS Bel-Air (10)	2–2 (4–5 p)	Saint-Palais SF (8)
65.	ASFC Vindelle (8)	2–2 (2–4 p)	ES Boulazac (6)
66.	AS Neuvic-Saint-Léon (9)	1–0	Jarnac SF (6)
67.	FC Fouras-Saint-Laurent (11)	0–1	JS Grande Champagne (8)
68.	FC Neuvic (11)	0–5	JA Isle (7)
69.	AS Mercoeur (11)	0–6	CS Feytiat (6)
70.	Cosnac FC (9)	1–2	US Bessines-Morterolles (8)
71.	Foot Sud 87 (10)	1–1 (2–4 p)	FC Limeuil (9)
72.	Olympique Larche Lafeuillade (10)	1–0	US Limoges Bastide (10)
73.	SC Saint-Pierre-du-Mont (8)	2–1	US Portugais Pau (8)
74.	ES Canéjan (10)	3–2	FC Vallée du Lot (9)
75.	US La Catte (8)	0–1	FC Sévigné Jonzac-Saint-Germain (8)
76.	AL Poey-de-Lescar (8)	0–2	FC Marmande 47 (6)
77.	USC Léognan (9)	0–1	Patronage Bazadais (7)
78.	La Brède FC (7)	0–1	Targon-Soulignac FC (8)
79.	Association Saint-Laurent Billère (9)	0–2	ES Meillon-Assat-Narcastet (8)
80.	FC Roquefortais (11)	2–2 (2–4 p)	Chalosse FC (10)
81.	US Marsan (8)	0–0 (2–4 p)	SC Cadaujac (8)
82.	RC Bordeaux (8)	1–2	Stade Montois (7)
83.	Pardies Olympique (10)	1–1 (2–4 p)	Seignosse-Capbreton-Soustons FC (7)
84.	Elan Boucalais (8)	1–2	US Lège Cap Ferret (5)
85.	CS Lantonnais (8)	1–1 (1–3 p)	Stade Ygossais (8)
86.	Monein FC (11)	0–9	Croisés Saint-André Bayonne (7)
87.	US Saint-Palais Amikuze (9)	1–2	JA Dax (9)
88.	FC Côteaux Pécharmant (8)	2–4	FC Mascaret (8)
89.	FLR Le Monteil (10)	0–1	US Bouscataise (7)
90.	ES Saint-Amand-sur-Sèvre (11)	2–1	US Vicq-sur-Gartempe (9)
91.	Inter Bocage FC (8)	2–2 (3–0 p)	FC Airvo Saint-Jouin (8)
92.	CA Saint-Aubin-le-Cloud (9)	1–5	SO Châtellerault (5)
93.	ES Beaulieu-Breuil (10)	0–3	ES Aubinrorthais (8)
94.	AC Paizay-le-Sec (11)	0–0 (6–5 p)	AS Portugais Châtellerault (9)
95.	US Cissé (12)	2–4	CA Neuville (6)
96.	FC Vouneuil-sous-Biard-Béruges (9)	0–3	RC Parthenay Viennay (6)
97.	Ozon FC (7)	0–2	US Chauvigny (5)
98.	SA Mauzé-Rigné (11)	0–4	FC 3 Vallées 86 (7)
99.	US Saint-Sauveur (8)	0–2	Thouars Foot 79 (6)
100.	US Thuré-Besse (10)	2–2 (1–3 p)	SC Thouarsis (8)
101.	ACS La Rochelle (10)	2–2 (4–5 p)	AS Maritime (8)
102.	SC L'Absie-Largeasse/Moutiers-sous-Chantmerle (11)	0–2	UES Montmorillon (7)
103.	ES Saint-Cerbouillé (9)	0–3	FC Nueillaubiers (6)
104.	AAS Saint-Julien-l'Ars (10)	1–4	CS Naintré (8)
105.	FC Canton de Courçon (10)	3–4	US Chasseneuil (10)
106.	SEPC Exireuil (11)	2–2 (4–5 p)	AS Brie (9)
107.	AR Cherveux (12)	0–7	Étoile Maritime FC (7)
108.	FC Venise Verte (10)	1–1 (3–5 p)	FC Fontaine-le-Comte (8)
109.	AS Saint-Christophe 17 (11)	2–5	FC Usson-Isle (8)
110.	Avenir 79 FC (7)	8–0	ES Celles-Verrines (8)
111.	AS Aigre (10)	1–6	FC Dompierre-Sainte-Soulle (7)
112.	Union Sud Deux-Sèvres (10)	1–1 (2–4 p)	La Ligugéenne Football (7)
113.	ES Nonards Altillac (8)	2–1	FC Canton d'Oradour-sur-Vayres (9)
114.	FC Guéret (11)	0–0 (4–5 p)	USA Condat-sur-Vienne (11)
115.	SJ Bergerac (10)	1–1 (4–5 p)	Saint-Hilaire FC (11)

=== Fourth round ===
These matches were played on 27 and 28 September 2025, with one postponed until 5 October 2025 awaiting results of proceedings after the previous round.

Fourth Round Results: Nouvelle Aquitaine
Tie no	Home team (Tier)	Score	Away team (Tier)
1.	ES Oyré-Dangé (10)	1–2	Thouars Foot 79 (6)
2.	La Ligugéenne Football (7)	1–0	ES Buxerolles (6)
3.	FC Dompierre-Sainte-Soulle (7)	0–3	FC Chauray (4)
4.	Étoile Maritime FC (7)	2–0	RC Parthenay Viennay (6)
5.	ES Saint-Amand-sur-Sèvre (11)	1–4	FC Nueillaubiers (6)
6.	AS Maritime (8)	1–1 (5–4 p)	Inter Bocage FC (8)
7.	AS Mignaloux-Beauvoir (8)	0–0 (4–2 p)	AAAM Laleu-La Pallice (8)
8.	FC Boutonnais (10)	1–5	Avenir 79 FC (7)
9.	ES Aubinrorthais (8)	1–1 (2–4 p)	CA Neuville (6)
10.	FC Fontaine-le-Comte (8)	0–2	SO Châtellerault (5)
11.	CO Cerizay (7)	1–3	SC Thouarsis (8)
12.	CS Naintré (8)	1–7	FC Périgny (6)
13.	USA Condat-sur-Vienne (11)	2–2 (5–4 p)	ES Nonards Altillac (8)
14.	CA Rilhac-Rancon (8)	0–1	JA Isle (7)
15.	ES Guérétoise (7)	0–1	Tulle Football Corrèze (7)
16.	FC Cornilois-Fortunadais (9)	0–2	UES Montmorillon (7)
17.	CS Feytiat (6)	1–1 (7–6 p)	AS Panazol (5)
18.	ESA Brive (6)	0–2	US Chauvigny (5)
19.	AS Jugeals-Noailles (7)	5–2	AS Aixoise (7)
20.	Olympique Larche Lafeuillade (10)	1–1 (5–4 p)	US Auzances (9)
21.	AC Paizay-le-Sec (11)	1–1 (6–5 p)	ES Château-Larcher (8)
22.	US Bessines-Morterolles (8)	0–2	AS Gouzon (7)
23.	EF Aubussonnais (7)	1–3	Stade Poitevin FC (4)
24.	Vigenal FC Limoges (10)	2–3	Limoges Football (6)
25.	FC Mascaret (8)	6–1	FC Usson-Isle (8)
26.	US Anais (11)	1–2	OFC Ruelle (8)
27.	UAS Verdille (10)	1–4	FC Sévigné Jonzac-Saint-Germain (8)
28.	ES Mornac (10)	0–16	Angoulême Charente FC (4)
29.	FC Saint-Médard-en-Jalles (6)	2–2 (6–5 p)	Stade Bordelais (6)
30.	Trélissac-Antonne Périgord FC (6)	5–0	Stade Ruffec (7)
31.	AS Brie (9)	0–1	FC Rive Droite 33 (8)
32.	La Roche/Rivières FC Tardoire (7)	3–1	FC 3 Vallées 86 (7)
33.	ES Linars (8)	3–1	JS Grande Champagne (8)
34.	US Chasseneuil (10)	2–2 (5–4 p)	Libourne FA 2024 (8)
35.	ES Thénacaise (10)	0–3	ES Boulazac (6)
36.	Saint-Palais SF (8)	1–4	Rochefort FC (6)
37.	Saint-Hilaire FC (11)	3–1	Parempuyre FC (11)
38.	Union Saint-Jean (9)	3–1	Rouffignac OC (10)
39.	Union Saint-Bruno (7)	0–0 (3–2 p)	FC Médoc Océan (8)
40.	Athletic 89 FC (9)	2–2 (3–4 p)	AS Neuvic-Saint-Léon (9)
41.	US Mussidan-Saint Medard (9)	0–5	FC Marmande 47 (6)
42.	ES Blanquefort (7)	1–8	US Lège Cap Ferret (5)
43.	SA Mérignac (6)	4–1	Alliance Foot 3B (7)
44.	Bergerac Périgord FC (8)	1–2	FC Girondins de Bordeaux (4)
45.	FC Limeuil (9)	2–2 (3–4 p)	Targon-Soulignac FC (8)
46.	US Bouscataise (7)	2–1	FC Arsac-Pian Médoc (7)
47.	JS Sireuil (7)	0–1	Entente Boé Bon-Encontre (6)
48.	SC Mouthiers (8)	2–3	Jeunesse Villenave (6)
49.	Patronage Bazadais (7)	2–2 (6–7 p)	Biscarrosse OFC (7)
50.	FC Lescar (7)	0–7	Aviron Bayonnais (4)
51.	FA Morlaàs Est Béarn (9)	0–2	Seignosse-Capbreton-Soustons FC (7)
52.	JA Dax (9)	0–5	Saint-Paul Sport (6)
53.	Arin Luzien (6)	2–0	Andernos Sport FC (7)
54.	ES Canéjan (10)	2–3	SC Cadaujac (8)
55.	Croisés Saint-André Bayonne (7)	0–0 (4–1 p)	SC Saint-Pierre-du-Mont (8)
56.	FC Bords de Garonne (10)	1–3	AS Mazères-Uzos-Rontignon (6)
57.	Stade Ygossais (8)	0–1	FC Bassin d'Arcachon (5)
58.	Stade Montois (7)	4–1	FC des Graves (7)
59.	Chalosse FC (10)	1–0	ES Meillon-Assat-Narcastet (8)
60.	Stade Pessacais UC (9)	2–2 (5–3 p)	FC Biganos (6)

=== Fifth round ===
These matches were played on 11 and 12 October 2025.

Fifth Round Results: Nouvelle Aquitaine
Tie no	Home team (Tier)	Score	Away team (Tier)
1.	Avenir 79 FC (7)	1–2	AS Maritime (8)
2.	AC Paizay-le-Sec (11)	0–3	Stade Poitevin FC (4)
3.	US Chasseneuil (10)	4–2	SC Thouarsis (8)
4.	AS Mignaloux-Beauvoir (8)	0–5	US Chauvigny (5)
5.	UES Montmorillon (7)	2–2 (4–2 p)	La Ligugéenne Football (7)
6.	AS Gouzon (7)	0–0 (5–4 p)	SO Châtellerault (5)
7.	Étoile Maritime FC (7)	2–0	FC Chauray (4)
8.	Rochefort FC (6)	4–5	FC Périgny (6)
9.	CA Neuville (6)	1–0	La Roche/Rivières FC Tardoire (7)
10.	Thouars Foot 79 (6)	2–1	FC Nueillaubiers (6)
11.	USA Condat-sur-Vienne (11)	1–2	FC Saint-Médard-en-Jalles (6)
12.	Saint-Hilaire FC (11)	1–5	OFC Ruelle (8)
13.	Olympique Larche Lafeuillade (10)	1–1 (6–5 p)	FC Rive Droite 33 (8)
14.	AS Neuvic-Saint-Léon (9)	1–3	ES Boulazac (6)
15.	FC Mascaret (8)	0–1	CS Feytiat (6)
16.	FC Sévigné Jonzac-Saint-Germain (8)	0–7	Angoulême Charente FC (4)
17.	ES Linars (8)	1–2	Limoges Football (6)
18.	JA Isle (7)	1–2	US Bouscataise (7)
19.	Tulle Football Corrèze (7)	0–1	FC Girondins de Bordeaux (4)
20.	AS Jugeals-Noailles (7)	1–2	Trélissac-Antonne Périgord FC (6)
21.	Biscarrosse OFC (7)	1–2	Seignosse-Capbreton-Soustons FC (7)
22.	SC Cadaujac (8)	0–5	Aviron Bayonnais (4)
23.	Stade Montois (7)	1–2	SA Mérignac (6)
24.	Targon-Soulignac FC (8)	2–1	Croisés Saint-André Bayonne (7)
25.	Stade Pessacais UC (9)	2–0	Union Saint-Bruno (7)
26.	Union Saint-Jean (9)	3–2	Chalosse FC (10)
27.	Jeunesse Villenave (6)	0–4	FC Bassin d'Arcachon (5)
28.	Saint-Paul Sport (6)	0–0 (0–3 p)	FC Marmande 47 (6)
29.	Entente Boé Bon-Encontre (6)	3–3 (4–3 p)	US Lège Cap Ferret (5)
30.	AS Mazères-Uzos-Rontignon (6)	2–2 (4–2 p)	Arin Luzien (6)

=== Sixth round ===
These matches were played on 25 and 26 October 2025.

Sixth Round Results: Nouvelle Aquitaine
Tie no	Home team (Tier)	Score	Away team (Tier)
1.	Limoges Football (6)	2–4	Stade Poitevin FC (4)
2.	ES Boulazac (6)	0–4	FC Girondins de Bordeaux (4)
3.	Olympique Larche Lafeuillade (10)	0–4	FC Bassin d'Arcachon (5)
4.	Targon-Soulignac FC (8)	0–2	US Chauvigny (5)
5.	SA Mérignac (6)	1–0	Thouars Foot 79 (6)
6.	US Bouscataise (7)	0–2	Entente Boé Bon-Encontre (6)
7.	CA Neuville (6)	0–2	Angoulême Charente FC (4)
8.	AS Maritime (8)	0–5	Trélissac-Antonne Périgord FC (6)
9.	FC Périgny (6)	5–2 (Note: Tie reversed from original draw.)	Étoile Maritime FC (7)
10.	CS Feytiat (6)	2–2 (2–3 p)	UES Montmorillon (7)
11.	OFC Ruelle (8)	1–5	Seignosse-Capbreton-Soustons FC (7)
12.	FC Saint-Médard-en-Jalles (6)	0–0 (4–5 p)	AS Gouzon (7)
13.	Union Saint-Jean (9)	0–14	Aviron Bayonnais (4)
14.	Stade Pessacais UC (9)	1–1 (3–5 p)	AS Mazères-Uzos-Rontignon (6)
15.	US Chasseneuil (10)	1–2	FC Marmande 47 (6)
