= 2025–26 Coupe de France preliminary rounds =

2025–26 Coupe de France
Coupe Charles Simon

Tournament details
- Country: France

The 2025–26 Coupe de France preliminary rounds made up the qualifying competition to decide which teams took part in the main competition from the seventh round. This was the 109th season of the main football cup competition of France. The competition was organised by the French Football Federation (FFF) and was open to all clubs in French football, as well as clubs from the overseas departments and territories (Guadeloupe, French Guiana, Martinique, Mayotte, New Caledonia, Tahiti, Réunion, Saint Martin, and Saint Pierre and Miquelon). 166 teams were due to qualify for the seventh round from the process, being 155 from the mainland regions and 11 from overseas territories.

The six (or more, if required) preliminary rounds were organised by the 13 Regional leagues from the mainland, and the 6 Regional leagues of the overseas departments and territories. They took place between April and October 2025.

== Schedule ==
Although all mainland regions follow a set schedule from the third round, regions are allowed to set their own schedules for earlier rounds, including any preliminaries required. The Paris-Île-de-France league chose to hold their early rounds at the end of the 2024–25 season, rather the normal August dates.

Overseas territories organise their own qualifying tournaments, aligning with entry into the main tournament at the seventh round.

Round	Date
Third round	13 September 2025
Fourth round	27 September 2025
Fifth round	11 October 2025
Sixth round	27 October 2025

== Leagues ==
The details of the qualifying rounds for each league is separated out to individual articles, to avoid this article being too lengthy.

=== Overseas leagues ===
==== Mayotte ====
On 29 April 2025, the league published the draw for the first round of the competition, named as the Framing Round. Featuring 34 teams from the fourth division of the league structure, this was scheduled to take place on 25 May 2025. The league published the second round draw (later referred to as the first round in results pages) on 4 June 2025. 21 ties were drawn, with eleven Régionale 1 teams, and eleven teams from other divisions being drawn to receive byes. Ties were scheduled to take place on 28 June 2025. The third round draw was published at the same time, with 12 ties drawn, and 20 teams drawn to receive byes. Ties were scheduled to take place on 19 July 2025. The draw for the round of 32 was published on 30 July 2025. Subsequent round draws were fixed at the same time.

The match was played on 11 October 2025.

Final results: Mayotte
Tie no	Home team (Tier)	Score	Away team (Tier)
1.	(Mayotte) Espérance d'Iloni' (R1)	0–1	Bandrélé FC (R1) (Mayotte)

==== Réunion ====
The league rules for this season specified that the qualifying competition would be open to teams from the top two divisions, Régionale 1 and Régionale 2. The draw for the opening round of the competition, referred to as the second round to align with the mainland convention, was published on 16 April 2025, with 24 ties drawn. The third round draw was published a week later, on 23 April 2025, with the remaining eight clubs entering at this stage. The fourth round draw was published on 25 June 2025. The fifth round draw was published on 20 August 2025. The sixth round draw was published on 8 October 2025.

These matches were played on 26 October 2025.

Sixth round results: Réunion
Tie no	Home team (Tier)	Score	Away team (Tier)
1.	(Réunion) JS Saint-Pierroise (R1)	1–1 (2–4 p)	ES Dominicaine (R1) (Réunion)
2.	(Réunion) FC Bagatelle Sainte-Suzanne (R2)	1–1 (3–5 p)	Saint-Pauloise FC (R1) (Réunion)

Note: Reúnion League Structure (no promotion to French League Structure):
Régional 1 (R1)
Régional 2 (R2)

==== French Guiana ====
The draw for the opening round of the competition, named as the second round to align with the main competition, was published on 15 August 2025 by the league. Eight ties were drawn, in order to fix 16 ties in the third round, meaning 40 teams entered the competition. The third round draw was published by the league on 28 August 2025. The fourth round draw was published on 14 September 2025. Due to the spread of dates of the fourth round ties, the draws for the fifth and sixth rounds were published across two dates, 22 September and 6 October 2025.

These matches were played on 18 and 29 October 2025.

Sixth Round Results: French Guiana
Tie no	Home team (Tier)	Score	Away team (Tier)
1.	(French Guiana) US de Matoury (R1)	1–4	ASE Matoury (R1) (French Guiana)
2.	(French Guiana) ASC Le Geldar (R1)	1–0	US Sinnamary (R1) (French Guiana)

Note: French Guiana League Structure (no promotion to French League Structure):
Régional 1 (R1)
Régional 2 (R2)
Régional 3 (R3)

==== Martinique ====
The draw for the first preliminary round, referred to as the second round to align with the rest of the competition, took place some time before 29 August 2025, with 22 ties drawn. The third round draw, including the ten teams given a bye until this stage, appeared online by 5 September 2025. From this stage, the draw was split into two halves. The draw for the fourth round took place on 16 September 2025. The fifth round draw took place on 6 October 2025. The sixth round paired the winners of the two fifth round matches in each half of the draw.

These matches were played on 30 October and 4 November 2025.

Sixth Round Results: Martinique
Tie no	Home team (Tier)	Score	Away team (Tier)
1.	(Martinique) Club Colonial (R1)	2–2 (6–7 p)	Espoir Sainte-Luce (R1) (Martinique)
2.	(Martinique) Éveil Les Trois Islets (R2)	2–2 (3–2 p)	Golden Star de Fort-de-France (R1) (Martinique)

Note: Martinique League Structure (no promotion to French League Structure):
Régionale 1 (R1)
Régionale 2 (R2)
Régionale 3 (R3)

==== Guadeloupe ====
The draw for the opening round of the competition, named as the second round to align with the main competition, was published on the league's Facebook page on 14 August 2025, with 17 ties drawn, featuring teams from the second and third levels of football in Guadeloupe. The third round draw first appeared on the league's Facebook page on 12 September 2025, with 16 ties draws, and the remaining teams from the region, and the team from the Collectivity of Saint Martin entering at this stage. The fourth round draw appeared on the league's Facebook page on 26 September 2025. The fifth round draw was made public on the league's Facebook page on 10 October 2025. The sixth round pairings were published on 24 October 2025.

These matches were played on 26 and 31 October 2025.

Sixth Round Results: Guadeloupe
Tie no	Home team (Tier)	Score	Away team (Tier)
1.	(Guadeloupe) La Gauloise de Basse-Terre (R1)	0–1	CS Moulien (R1) (Guadeloupe)
2.	(Guadeloupe) AS Gosier (R1)	3–1	Dynamo Le Moule (R1) (Guadeloupe)

Note: Guadeloupe League Structure (no promotion to French League Structure):
Ligue Régionale 1 (R1)
Ligue Régionale 2 (R2)
Ligue Régionale 3 (R3)

==== Saint Pierre and Miquelon ====
The Overseas Collectivity of Saint Pierre and Miquelon has only three teams, so there is just one match in each of two rounds, with one team receiving a bye to the second round. The draw for the first round was made on December 16 2024. The first round took place on 5 July 2025, and the second round took place on 20 July 2025. The winner gained entry to the third round draw of the Nouvelle-Aquitaine region.

This match was played on 20 July 2025.

Second Round Result : Saint Pierre and Miquelon
Tie no	Home team (Tier)	Score	Away team (Tier)
2.	(Saint Pierre and Miquelon) AS Saint Pierraise	0–0 (5–4 p)	AS Miquelonnaise (Saint Pierre and Miquelon)

=== Nouvelle-Aquitaine ===
A total of fifteen teams qualified from the Nouvelle-Aquitaine preliminary rounds.

In 2024–25, three teams from the region progressed to the round of 64. Fourth-tier FC Girondins de Bordeaux were defeated at home by Ligue 1 side Stade Rennais FC, sixth-tier SA Mérignac lost on penalties against Ligue 2 side Stade Lavallois, and seventh-tier FC Marmande 47, the lowest ranked side remaining in the competition, were beated 7–0 by Le Mans FC from Championnat National.

These matches were played on 25 and 26 October 2025.

Sixth Round Results: Nouvelle Aquitaine
Tie no	Home team (Tier)	Score	Away team (Tier)
1.	Limoges Football (6)	2–4	Stade Poitevin FC (4)
2.	ES Boulazac (6)	0–4	FC Girondins de Bordeaux (4)
3.	Olympique Larche Lafeuillade (10)	0–4	FC Bassin d'Arcachon (5)
4.	Targon-Soulignac FC (8)	0–2	US Chauvigny (5)
5.	SA Mérignac (6)	1–0	Thouars Foot 79 (6)
6.	US Bouscataise (7)	0–2	Entente Boé Bon-Encontre (6)
7.	CA Neuville (6)	0–2	Angoulême Charente FC (4)
8.	AS Maritime (8)	0–5	Trélissac-Antonne Périgord FC (6)
9.	FC Périgny (6)	5–2 (Note: Tie reversed from original draw.)	Étoile Maritime FC (7)
10.	CS Feytiat (6)	2–2 (2–3 p)	UES Montmorillon (7)
11.	OFC Ruelle (8)	1–5	Seignosse-Capbreton-Soustons FC (7)
12.	FC Saint-Médard-en-Jalles (6)	0–0 (4–5 p)	AS Gouzon (7)
13.	Union Saint-Jean (9)	0–14	Aviron Bayonnais (4)
14.	Stade Pessacais UC (9)	1–1 (3–5 p)	AS Mazères-Uzos-Rontignon (6)
15.	US Chasseneuil (10)	1–2	FC Marmande 47 (6)

=== Pays de la Loire ===
A total of eleven teams qualified from the Pays de la Loire preliminary rounds.

In 2024–25, Le Mans FC were the team from the region to progress furthest in the main competition, reaching the round of 16 before being beaten 2–0 by eventual champions Paris Saint-Germain FC.

On 23 July 2025, the league published that 519 teams from the region had entered the competition, including the four teams qualifying directly for the main competition. At the same time, they confirmed the first round would consist of 200 ties, including 46 teams from Régionale 3 and all teams from the district level leagues. The first round draw was published by the league on 28 July 2025. The second round draw, which saw the entry of the remaining teams from Régional 3 and those from Régional 2, was published on 28 August 2025. The third round draw, featuring the entry into the competition of the 18 Régional 1 teams and the 7 Championnat National 3 teams, was published on 4 September 2025. The fourth round draw, which saw the 4 teams from the region that play in Championnat National 2 join the competition, was published on 17 September 2025. The fifth round draw was published on 2 October 2025. The sixth round draw was published on 15 October 2025.

These matches were played on 25 and 26 October 2025.

Sixth Round Results: Pays de la Loire
Tie no	Home team (Tier)	Score	Away team (Tier)
1.	AS Le Mans Villaret (6)	1–4	Sablé FC (6)
2.	ES Blain (7)	0–8	FC Challans (5)
3.	CA Évronnais (8)	0–3	Les Sables VF (5)
4.	FC Fuilet-Chaussaire (9)	1–5	La France d'Aizenay (6)
5.	Le Cellier-Mauves FC (8)	2–0	Saint-Aubin-Guérande Football (8)
6.	AS Vieillevigne-La Planche (8)	0–5	Vendée Fontenay Foot (5)
7.	US La Baule-Le Pouliguen (6)	1–4	Les Herbiers VF (4)
8.	Beaumont SA (7)	1–1 (4–2 p)	AS La Châtaigneraie (5)
9.	Gazélec Le Mans (8)	0–2	Ancienne Château-Gontier (6)
10.	Orvault SF (6)	1–1 (3–1 p)	VFC La Roche-sur-Yon (4)
11.	SC Beaucouzé (6)	3–2	ESOF La Roche-sur-Yon (6)

=== Centre-Val de Loire ===
A total of six teams will qualify from the Centre-Val de Loire preliminary rounds.

In 2024–25, Tours FC progressed to the round of 64, to be the last team standing from the region. However, they were removed from the competition at this stage after being held responsibility for the cancellation of the scheduled match against FC Lorient.

On 21 July 2025, the league published the structure of the preliminary rounds, and noted that 261 teams from the region had entered the competition. The ties for the first two rounds of the competition were also published on the same day. The first round draw saw 200 teams enter, including all teams from departmental divisions and 16 from the third division of the regional league. The second round draw saw 50 additional teams enter, including all remaining teams from regional divisions. The five teams from the region that participate in Championnat National 3 entered the competition at the third round stage, the draw for which was published on 4 September 2025. The draw for the fourth round, featuring the four teams from Championnat National 2, was carried out on 16 September 2025. The fifth round draw, which included the two sides from Championnat National, took place on 1 October 2025. The sixth round draw was published on 14 October 2025.

These matches were played on 25 and 26 October 2025.

Sixth Round Results: Centre-Val de Loire
Tie no	Home team (Tier)	Score	Away team (Tier)
1.	US Le Poinçonnet (8)	1–1 (3–2 p)	FC Drouais (6)
2.	C'Chartres Football (5)	1–3	Blois Football 41 (4)
3.	SO Romorantin (5)	4–1	Avoine OCC (6)
4.	AS Contres (7)	0–4	LB Châteauroux (3)
5.	Vineuil SF (6)	0–3	US Orléans (3)
6.	UF Touraine (5)	1–0	FC Montlouis (4)

=== Corsica ===
Two teams qualified from the Corsica preliminary rounds.

In 2024–25, USC Corte progressed to the Round of 64, after hosting Mayotte side Diables Noir in the previous round, and eventually lost narrowly to Ligue 1 side OGC Nice in a penalty shoot-out.

On 7 August 2025, the league announced that 37 teams from the region had entered the competition, and laid out the format of the competition. 19 teams from the second, third and fourth regional divisions would enter at the start of the competition, aligned with the second round of the other region, with nine ties being drawn and one bye being awarded. The 11 teams from Régional 1 and the 3 teams from Championnat National 3 would enter at the third round stage, the 2 teams from Championnat National 2 would enter at the fourth round stage, and the one team from Championnat National would enter at the fifth round stage.

These matches were played on 25 October 2025.

Sixth Round Results: Corsica
Tie no	Home team (Tier)	Score	Away team (Tier)
1.	AS Furiani-Agliani (4)	2–1	FC Balagne (5)
2.	USC Corte (6)	1–3	Gazélec Ajaccio (5)

=== Bourgogne-Franche-Comté ===
A total of nine teams qualified from the Bourgogne-Franche-Comté preliminary rounds.

In 2024–25, FC Sochaux-Montbéliard progressed furthest in the main competition from the region. They reached the Round of 32 before losing a lengthy penalty shoot-out to Ligue 2 side En Avant Guingamp.

The first round draw for the competition took place on 11 July 2025, and was published by the league four days later. At the same time, the league confirmed that 381 clubs from the region would take part in the competition, and that the first round would consist of 117 ties. All the teams involved at this stage would come from the departmental divisions, with 17 teams from these divisions exempted to the second round. Amendments were made after the initial draw. On 17 July 2025, the league announced that two first round fixtures would be cancelled, and the four participating teams given byes to the second round, due to the confirmation of Jura Sud Foot being engaged in Championnat National 3. On 12 August 2025, the league announced that they would have to add back one of the cancelled fixtures, by drawing of lots, due to the confirmation that ASPTT Dijon would play in Championnat National 3.

The second round draw was published on 19 August 2025, prior to the first round being completed, with the entry into the competition of the departmental division teams exempted from the first round, and the teams from the regional divisions. The third round draw was published on 2 September 2025, with the teams from Championnat National 3 entering at this stage. The fourth round draw was published on 16 September 2025. The fifth round draw, featuring the two teams from Championnat National, was published on 30 September 2025. The sixth round draw was published on 14 October 2025.

These matches were played on 25 and 26 October 2025.

Sixth Round Results: Bourgogne-Franche-Comté
Tie no	Home team (Tier)	Score	Away team (Tier)
1.	Haute-Lizaine Pays d'Héricourt (8)	0–4	Racing Besançon (5)
2.	FC Montceau Bourgogne (6)	3–0	FR Saint Marcel (6)
3.	Is-Selongey Football (6)	1–0	Dijon FCO (3)
4.	FC Seveux-Motey (10)	0–5	ASPTT Dijon (5)
5.	CA Pontarlier (5)	8–0	FC Sens (6)
6.	FC Villars-l'Isle-Saint-Maurice-Colombier-Blussans (7)	1–1 (9–8 p)	ASM Belfort (5)
7.	AS Quetigny (7)	3–0	AS Garchizy (6)
8.	US Pont-de-Roide-Vermondans (6)	0–3	FC Sochaux Montbéliard (3)
9.	FC Chalon (5)	2–2 (6–5 p)	Mâcon 71 (5)

=== Grand Est ===
A total of twenty teams qualified from the Grand Est preliminary rounds.

In the 2024–25 edition of the competition, both FCSR Haguenau of Championnat National 2 and ES Thaon of Championnat National 3 progressed furthest, making it to the round of 32 before losing out. Thaon were beaten by Ligue 1 side RC Strasbourg Alsace on penalties, whilst Haguenau lost 1–3 at home to Ligue 2 side USL Dunkerque.

On 18 July 2025 the league published the draw for the first round of the competition. The draw consisted of 343 ties featuring teams from district divisions and two from the third tier of the regional league. The draw also listed the 248 clubs exempt at this stage, confirming that 934 teams from the region were taking part in the competition this season. The second round draw, consisting of 271 ties, and featuring the entry of all the remaining sides from the second and third levels of regional league, was published on 19 August 2025.

The third round draw, which totalled 155 ties, and featured the entry of the remaining teams from the regional league, and the three teams from Championnat National 3, was published on 2 September 2025. The fourth round draw, where the five teams from Championnat National 2 entered, was conducted separately in each of the three sectors of the region, over three days from 16 September 2025 to 18 September 2025. The fifth round draw took place on 1 October 2025. The sixth round draw was published on 15 October 2025.

These matches were played on 25 and 26 October 2025.

Sixth Round Results: Grand Est
Tie no	Home team (Tier)	Score	Away team (Tier)
1.	Bar-le-Duc FC (7)	1–1 (3–5 p)	Olympique Charleville Prix Ardenne Métropole (5)
2.	GSA Tomblaine (8)	1–0	Reims Murigny Franco Portugais (7)
3.	US Thionville Lusitanos (4)	1–0 (Note: Tie reversed from original draw.)	USAG Uckange (6)
4.	APM Metz (6)	6–2	RS Amanvillers (7)
5.	ES Villerupt-Thil (6)	1–3	FC Bogny (6)
6.	EF Reims Sainte-Anne (7)	3–0	FC Fontaine-Origny-Vallant (8)
7.	ENJ Val-de-Seille (8)	1–4	AS Saint-Brice-Courcelles (7)
8.	RC Épernay Champagne (6)	3–0	AS Pagny-sur-Moselle (6)
9.	FC Nogentais (7)	0–2	Cormontreuil FC (6)
10.	FC Saint-Meziery (6)	1–0	SAS Épinal (4)
11.	FC Freyming (7)	2–0	SR Saint-Dié (6)
12.	US Raon-l'Étape (6)	2–0	FC Geispolsheim 01 (7)
13.	US Sarre-Union (6)	2–0	FC Kronenbourg Strasbourg (7)
14.	FCE Schirrhein (6)	1–1 (7–8 p)	Association Still-Mutzig (6)
15.	AS Aspach-le-Haut (9)	2–2 (4–5 p)	FC Mulhouse (5)
16.	US Wittenheim (7)	3–0	FC Saverne (8)
17.	FC Hirtzfelden (8)	0–2	FCO Strasbourg Koenigshoffen 06 (6)
18.	US Forbach (6)	6–2	FCSR Haguenau (4)
19.	Sarreguemines FC (6)	2–0	SR Colmar (4)
20.	FA Illkirch Graffenstaden (6)	0–0 (7–8 p)	ASC Biesheim (4)

=== Méditerranée ===
A total of five teams qualified from the Méditerranée preliminary rounds, one less than the previous season.

In the 2024–25 AS Cannes of Championnat National 2 progressed furthest in the competition from the region, with a run to the semi-final stage during which they beat Ligue 2 opposition in Grenoble Foot 38, FC Lorient and En Avant Guingamp along the way. They were denied a place in the final, losing 2–1 to Stade de Reims from Ligue 1.

The first round draw was published on 24 July 2025, with 98 ties featuring all entering teams from the district leagues and the third tier of the regional league, and 16 teams drawn at random from the second tier of the regional league. The 58 ties of the second round draw, which saw the remaining regional league teams enter the competition, were published on 26 August 2025.

The third round draw was published on 4 September 2025, and saw the entry to the competition of the four regional teams from Championnat National 3. The fourth round draw, including the seven regional teams from Championnat National 2, took place on 18 September 2025. The ties for the fifth and sixth round were set in a single draw on 1 October 2025. The single Championnat National side from the region entered at the fifth round stage.

These matches were played on 25 and 26 October 2025, with one replayed on 12 November 2025.

Sixth Round Results: Méditerranée
Tie no	Home team (Tier)	Score	Away team (Tier)
1.	UA Valettoise (7)	1–1 (2–3 p)	Istres FC (4)
2.	SC Aubagne Air Bel (3)	3–0 (Note: The original match on 26 October 2025, which had been reversed from the original draw due to safety concerns, was abandoned late in the game, with the score 3–1, after clashes in the stands which required police attendance to break up. The league ordered the game be replayed at a neutral venue, and this took place on 12 November 2025.)	FC Avignon (7)
3.	RC Pays de Grasse (4)	3–1	ES Fosséenne (5)
4.	USR Pertuis (7)	0–3	AS Cannes (4)
5.	Carnoux FC (5)	3–2	ÉFC Fréjus Saint-Raphaël (4)

=== Occitanie ===
A total of eleven teams qualified from the Occitanie preliminary rounds, one more than last season.

In 2024–25, Régional 1 side Union Saint-Jean FC progressed furthest in the main competition of the ten teams from the region, reaching the Round of 64 by beating Championnat National side FC Versailles 78 in the eighth round, before losing to Ligue 1 team AS Monaco FC.

On 9 July 2025, the league announced that 500 teams from the region had entered the competition. The draw for the first two rounds was originally due to take place on 10 July 2025, but had to be postponed due to late changes in eligibility. The draws eventually took place on 17 July 2025, and were published district-by-district as is usual for the region.

The third round draw was published on 2 September 2025, with the ten regional teams playing in Championnat National 3 entering at this stage. The fourth round draw, including the only Championnat National 2 team from the region, was published on 16 September 2025. The fifth round draw was published on 30 September 2025. The sixth round draw was published on 17 October 2025.

These matches were played on 25 and 26 October 2025.

Sixth Round Results: Occitanie
Tie no	Home team (Tier)	Score	Away team (Tier)
1.	Lavaur FC (7)	3–3 (3–4 p)	US Pibrac (7)
2.	JS Toulouse Pradettes (8)	0–3	RCO Agde (5)
3.	US Seysses-Frouzins (7)	1–1 (7–8 p)	Blagnac FC (5)
4.	AS Atlas Paillade (6)	8–0	ÉS Paulhan (7)
5.	ES Grau-du-Roi (6)	1–1 (4–5 p)	AF Biars-Bretenoux (6)
6.	Union Saint-Jean FC (6)	2–1	US Castanéenne (5)
7.	Olympique La Peyrade FC (9)	1–2	Auch Football (7)
8.	US Colomiers Football (5)	5–1	Entente Saint-Clément-Montferrier (6)
9.	Avenir Castriote (11)	0–3	FC 2 Rives 82 (6)
10.	Avenir Fonsorbais (6)	0–2	Canet Roussillon FC (5)
11.	US Mauguio Carnon (8)	0–0 (4–3 p)	Stade Beaucairois FC (5)

=== Hauts-de-France ===
A total of twenty-one teams qualified from the Hauts-de-France preliminary rounds.

In 2024–25, Valenciennes FC progressed furthest of the clubs from the region, reaching the round of 32 before losing out to their Championnat National rivals Le Mans FC after a penalty shoot-out.

Draws for the first two rounds were carried out separately by districts. In Artois, the first round draw was published on 16 July 2025, and the second round draw was published on 26 August 2025. 61 ties were drawn in the first round, and 48 in the second round. In Escaut, both first and second round draws were published together on 5 August 2025, with 74 ties in the first round and 55 in the second round. In Flandres, the first two rounds were published together on 22 July 2025, with 60 ties in the first round and 44 ties in the second round. The district of Côte d’Opale published the first two rounds on 11 August 2025, with 57 ties in the first round and 44 in the second round. In Aisne, the two rounds were published together on 24 July 2025, with 38 ties in the first round and 28 ties in the second round. In the district of Oise, the first round draw was published on 22 July 2025, with 50 ties drawn, and the second round draw was published on 25 August 2025, with 37 ties drawn. In Somme district, the first round draw was published on 17 July 2025, with 48 ties drawn, and the second round draw was published on 26 August 2025, with 35 ties drawn.

The third round draw, which saw the entry of teams which play in Régional 1 and one team from Championnat National 3, was published on 2 September 2025. The fourth round draw, which saw the entry into the competition of teams from the region playing in Championnat National 3 and Championnat National 2, was carried out on 18 September 2025. The fifth round draw, including the one team from the region that plays in Championnat National, was published on 1 October 2025. The draw for the sixth round was published on 20 October 2025.

These matches were played on 24, 25 and 26 October 2025.

Sixth Round Results: Hauts-de-France (Artois)
Tie no	Home team (Tier)	Score	Away team (Tier)
1.	AC Cambrai (6)	1–1 (4–2 p)	SC Coquelles (7)
2.	Arras FA (6)	2–2 (4–5 p)	CS Avion (7)
3.	FC Lecelles-Rosult (9)	1–1 (2–4 p)	AS Beauvais Oise (4)
4.	US Prémontré Saint-Gobain (8)	2–1	US Esquelbecq (7)
5.	ES Cappelloise (9)	1–0	US Téteghem (9)
6.	Olympique Grande-Synthe (6)	1–2	US Chantilly (4)
7.	FC Chambly Oise (4)	4–0	Wasquehal FC (4)
8.	Olympique Héninois (8)	0–3	Stade Béthunois (6)
9.	Écureuils Itancourt-Neuville (6)	2–3	US Camon (6)
10.	Bondues FC (6)	2–1	ES Bully-les-Mines (7)
11.	US Saint-Omer (6)	0–2	Iris Club de Croix (5)
12.	OS Aire-sur-la-Lys (7)	1–0	RC Salouël Saleux (7)
13.	US Le Pays du Valois (5)	1–2	Saint-Amand FC (6)
14.	AS Steenvorde (6)	1–0	RC Calais (6)
15.	ES Mouvaux (8)	1–3	Olympique Marcquois Football (6)
16.	US Tourquennoise (6)	1–4	FC Porto Portugais Amiens (7)
17.	Éclair Neufchâtel-Hardelot (9)	1–5	SC Abbeville (7)
18.	JS Longuenesse (7)	4–1	US Choisy-au-Bac (7)
19.	FC Montigny-en-Gohelle (6)	2–2 (3–5 p)	Entente Feignies Aulnoye FC (4)
20.	US Saint-Pol-sur-Ternoise (8)	0–0 (3–4 p)	US Aubygeoise (9)
21.	US Nogent (8)	1–2	FC Loon-Plage (7)

=== Normandy ===
A total of nine teams qualified from the Normandy preliminary rounds, as in the previous season.

In 2024–25, Championnat National 3 side SU Dives-Cabourg progressed furthest in the main competition from the regional preliminary rounds, reaching the round of 16 where they lost to Championnat National 2 side AS Cannes.

The draw for the first round of the competition was published on 21 July 2025. 308 teams entered the competition at this stage. The second round draw took place on 27 August 2025, and saw the entry of the clubs from the second level of regional football.

The third round draw was published on 3 September 2025, with teams from Régional 1 and Championnat National 3 entering at this stage. The fourth round draw, which saw the teams from Championnat National 2 enter, was published on 17 September 2025. The fifth round draw was published on 1 October 2025, and saw the entry of the teams from Championnat National. The sixth round draw was made on 15 October 2025.

These matches were played on 25 and 26 October 2025.

Sixth Round Results: Normandy
Tie no	Home team (Tier)	Score	Away team (Tier)
1.	Yvetot AC (6)	3–2	FC Saint-Lô Manche (6)
2.	FAC Alizay (7)	0–4	Stade Malherbe Caen (3)
3.	Maladrerie OS (6)	0–1	US Quevilly-Rouen Métropole (3)
4.	CMS Oissel (5)	1–0	US Alençon (5)
5.	ES Coutances (7)	1–2	FC Dieppe (4)
6.	ASPTT Caen (6)	– (Note: Match abandoned at half time with the score 4–0 after Évreux FC 27 refused to continue. Évreux FC 27 ruled to have forfeited the tie.)	Évreux FC 27 (6)
7.	Bayeux FC (6)	1–0	Le Havre Caucriauville Sportif (5)
8.	Stade Porte Normande Vernon (7)	0–4	US Granville (4)
9.	US Avranches (4)	1–1 (5–4 p)	SU Dives-Cabourg (5)

=== Brittany ===
A total of fifteen teams qualified from the Brittany preliminary rounds.

In 2024–25, Stade Briochin were the only team from the region to progress beyond the eighth round, making a deep run to the quarter final stage before being beaten 7–0 by eventual competition winners Paris Saint-Germain FC.

On 1 July 2025, the league published details of the teams from the region participating in the competition this season. The article and the list itself stated 669 teams, though the headline stated 681. The draw for the first round was published on 30 July 2025, with 252 fixtures drawn. The second round draw was published on 27 August 2025, with 194 fixtures drawn.

The third round draw was published on 3 September 2025. 113 ties were drawn, and the teams from Régional 1 and Championnat National 3 entered at this stage. The fourth round draw was published on 17 September 2025, featuring teams from Championnat National 2, and with 58 ties drawn. The fifth round draw, including the two teams from Championnat National, was made on 1 October 2025, with 30 ties drawn. The sixth round draw was published on 15 October 2025.

These matches were played on 25 and 26 October 2025.

Sixth round results: Brittany
Tie no	Home team (tier)	Score	Away team (tier)
1.	AS Plouvien (7)	2–4	Stade Quimperlois (8)
2.	Vannes OC (5)	0–1	Dinan Léhon FC (4)
3.	Dernières Cartouches Carhaix (8)	2–2 (2–4 p)	AG Plouvorn (6)
4.	US Liffré (6)	1–3	Saint-Colomban Sportive Locminé (4)
5.	CEP Lorient (6)	0–1	Stade Plabennécois (6)
6.	Loudéac OSC (7)	1–3	EA Saint-Renan (6)
7.	Keriolets de Pluvigner (6)	0–3	Stade Briochin (3)
8.	FC Pen Hir Camaret (8)	2–2 (4–3 p)	Cercle Paul Bert Bréquigny (6)
9.	AS Ginglin Cesson (6)	2–2 (7–8 p)	US Concarneau (3)
10.	US Château-Malo (8)	1–0	FC Breteil-Talensac (7)
11.	AS Vignoc-Hédé-Guipel (6)	0–3	US Saint-Malo (4)
12.	US Fougères (5)	1–3	AS Vitré (5)
13.	CS Plédran (8)	3–2	ES Saint-Cast-le-Guildo (9)
14.	Saint-Pierre de Milizac (5)	2–2 (4–5 p)	GSI Pontivy (5)
15.	Bleuets Le Pertre-Brielles-Gennes-Saint-Cyr (8)	3–0	US Cléder (9)

=== Paris-Île-de-France ===
A total of eleven teams progressed from the Paris-Île-de-France preliminary rounds.

In 2024–25, both Football Club 93 Bobigny-Bagnolet-Gagny and JA Drancy progressed to the round of 64. Both were knocked out at that stage by Ligue One opposition, in Angers SCO and FC Nantes respectively.

In the Paris-Île-de-France region, the first two round usually take place before the end of season break. This season, the league announced on 8 April 2025 that 462 teams had entered the competition, and that the first round would take place in mid May and the second round in early June. Also announced was that the first round would consist of 176 ties, with one team exempted at this stage. A number of adjustments to the entry list were made before the date of the first round, resulting in an extra tie being added. On 13 May 2025 it was announced that there would be 131 ties in the second round, with the teams from the regional divisions entering at this stage.

The third round draw was published on 29 August 2025, with teams from Championnat National 3, including those relegated to Régional 1 at the end of the previous season, entering at this stage. 66 ties were drawn, with 13 teams receiving byes to the fourth round. The fourth round draw was published on 16 September 2025, with 41 ties drawn, including the three teams from Championnat National 2. The fifth round draw was published on 30 September 2025, with 22 matches drawn and the entry of the three teams from Championnat National. the sixth round draw was published on 15 October 2025.

These matches were played on 25 and 26 October 2025.

Sixth Round Results: Paris-Île-de-France
Tie no	Home team (Tier)	Score	Away team (Tier)
1.	Argenteuil FC (8)	1–6	FC Fleury 91 (3)
2.	AAS Sarcelles (6)	2–3	Paris 13 Atletico (3)
3.	US Lusitanos Saint-Maur (4)	1–1 (4–2 p)	Union Sportive Créteil Football (4)
4.	FC 93 Bobigny-Bagnolet-Gagny (4)	0–1	JA Drancy (5)
5.	Étoile Bobigny (9)	1–1 (4–2 p)	ESA Linas-Montlhéry (5)
6.	LSO Colombes (9)	2–3	US Ivry (5)
7.	Cergy Pontoise FC (7)	0–1	US Torcy (5)
8.	Montreuil FC (6)	1–1 (4–1 p)	FC Mantois 78 (6)
9.	Racing Club de France Football (5)	3–0	ES Colombienne (6)
10.	FCM Aubervilliers (5)	3–0	FC Melun (6)
11.	Amicale Villeneuve-la-Garenne (7)	3–0	Mitry Compans Goelly (7)

=== Auvergne-Rhône-Alpes ===
A total of twenty teams qualified from the Auvergne-Rhône-Alpes preliminary rounds.

In 2024–25, FC Bourgoin-Jallieu progressed furthest in the main competition, reaching the round of 16 before being defeated in a penalty shoot-out by Ligue 1 side Stade de Reims.

On 21 July 2025, the league announced that 913 clubs from the region had entered the competition. On 25 July 2025 the details of the first round draw were published, with 332 ties drawn, comprising teams from the district-level divisions, with 62 receiving byes. The second round draw was published on 18 August 2025, with all remaining teams up to and including the second regional level entering, and with 270 ties drawn.

The third round draw was made on 3 September 2025, featuring the entry of the 20 Régional 1 level teams and the 8 Championnat National 3 level teams, and saw 149 ties drawn. The fourth round draw, featuring entry of the 5 teams from Championnat National 2, was made on 17 September 2025, with 77 ties drawn. The fifth round draw was made on 1 October 2025, featuring the entry of the 3 Championnat National teams, with 40 ties drawn. The twenty ties of the sixth round were drawn on 13 October 2025.

These matches were played on 25 and 26 October 2025.

Sixth Round Results: Auvergne-Rhône-Alpes
Tie no	Home team (Tier)	Score	Away team (Tier)
1.	US Vic-le-Comte (8)	0–4	US Feurs (5)
2.	FC Chamalières (5)	1–1 (5–4 p)	Olympique de Valence (6)
3.	US Murat (8)	1–3	Entente Nord Lozère (7)
4.	AS Savigneux-Montbrison (8)	2–0	FC Saint-Étienne (9)
5.	Olympic Saint-Julien-Chapteuil (8)	1–5	US Ecotay-Moingt (8)
6.	AS Chavanay (6)	0–2	Andrézieux-Bouthéon FC (4)
7.	AA Lapalisse (7)	2–1	US Blavozy (6)
8.	Seauve Sports (8)	0–4	Hauts Lyonnais (5)
9.	FC Cournon-d'Auvergne (7)	0–5	Le Puy Foot 43 Auvergne (3)
10.	ES Meythet (11)	1–1 (4–5 p)	Olympique Villefontaine 2025 (7)
11.	ES Revermontoise (8)	1–10	Lyon-La Duchère (5)
12.	FC Rhône Vallées (6)	2–0	CS Neuville (7)
13.	ASF Pierrelatte (8)	5–1	FC Saint-Paul-en-Jarez (7)
14.	AS Montréal-la-Cluse (8)	2–1	FC Charvieu-Chavagneux (9)
15.	SS Allinges (9)	3–3 (16–15 p)	FC Bressans (9)
16.	AS Guéreins-Genouilleux (9)	0–1	Thonon Evian Grand Genève FC (5)
17.	Football Bourg-en-Bresse Péronnas 01 (3)	3–3 (4–3 p)	GFA Rumilly-Vallières (4)
18.	AC Seyssinet (5)	2–1	AS Saint-Priest (4)
19.	Olympique Rillieux (8)	0–1	FC Saint-Cyr Collonges au Mont d'Or (6)
20.	ES Drumettaz-Mouxy (8)	0–3	L'Étrat-La Tour Sportif (7)
