= 2022–23 Coupe de France preliminary rounds, overseas departments and territories =

The 2022–23 Coupe de France preliminary rounds, overseas departments and territories make up the qualifying competition to decide which teams from the French Overseas Departments and Territories take part in the main competition from the seventh round.

A total of eleven clubs will qualify from the overseas leagues, two each from Guadeloupe, French Guiana, Martinique, Réunion, and one each from Mayotte, New Caledonia and Tahiti.

In 2021–22, Saint-Denis FC from Réunion and AS Jumeaux de M'zouazia from Mayotte both made it to the round of 64, losing to Jura Sud Foot and Girondins de Bordeaux respectively.

== Mayotte ==
On 13 May 2022, the Mayotte league announced that 78 teams had entered the competition, from Régionale divisions 1 to 4. In the first round, 28 of the Régionale 4 teams would enter, with the other two receiving byes to the second round. By the league's own regulations, the 12 Régionale 1 teams should enter at the third round stage, meaning 20 teams would need to qualify from the second round. The league stated that "this calculation remains difficult" so took the decision to exempt everyone from the second round, leading to 64 teams in the third round (14 first round qualifiers + 12 Régionale 2 teams + 24 Régionale 3 teams + 12 Régionale 1 teams). The third round draw was published on 10 June 2022. The 16ème de Finale, or Round of 32, draw was published on 3 August 2022. The 8ème de Finale, or Round of 16, draw was published on 17 August 2022. The quarter final and semi final draw were made together and published on 31 August 2022.

=== First round (Mayotte) ===
These matches were played on 22 and 29 May 2022.

First round results: Mayotte
Tie no	Home team (tier)	Score	Away team (tier)
1.	(Mayotte) Tsoundzou Sport Kwale (R4)	2–1	ACSJ Alakarabu (R4) (Mayotte)
2.	(Mayotte) AS Ongojou (R4)	3–3 (6–7 p)	FC Mtsakandro (R4) (Mayotte)
3.	(Mayotte) VSS Hagnoudrou (R4)	5–0	Voulvavi Sport & Culture (R4) (Mayotte)
4.	(Mayotte) FC Shingabwé (R4)	1–3	AS Kahani (R4) (Mayotte)
5.	(Mayotte) US Ouangani (R4)	0–0 (4–5 p)	Lance Missile (R4) (Mayotte)
6.	(Mayotte) M'Tsanga 2000 (R4)	– (Note: Match was not played because FC Bouyouni did not submit a teamsheet in time. M'Tsanga 2000 qualify.)	FC Bouyouni (R4) (Mayotte)
7.	(Mayotte) ACSJ M'Liha (R4)	– (Note: Match was not played because Ouvoimoja FC refused to allow the referee to check the licenses of their players before kick-off. ACSJ M'Liha qualify.)	Ouvoimoja FC (R4) (Mayotte)
8.	(Mayotte) AS Papillon d'Honneur (R4)	0–0 (2–0 p)	ASC Wahadi (R4) (Mayotte)
9.	(Mayotte) Flamme d'Hajangoua (R4)	1–0	CJ Mronabéja (R4) (Mayotte)
10.	(Mayotte) Étoile de Hapandzo (R4)	2–2 (4–5 p)	Feu du Centre (R4) (Mayotte)
11.	(Mayotte) Trévani SC (R4)	3–0 (Note: Tie won by means of forfeit.)	Arantabe FC (R4) (Mayotte)
12.	(Mayotte) CS M'ramadoudou (R4)	5–2	Makoulatsa FC (R4) (Mayotte)
13.	(Mayotte) ASCEE Nyambadao (R4)	2–2 (2–0 p)	Tornade Club de Majicavo-Lamir (R4) (Mayotte)
14.	(Mayotte) USC Labattoir (R4)	2–1	Mahabou SC (R4) (Mayotte)

Note: Mayotte League structure (no promotion to French League structure):
Régionale 1 (R1)
Régionale 2 (R2)
Régionale 3 (R3)
Régionale 4 (R4)

=== Third round (Mayotte) ===
These matches were played on 25 and 26 June 2022.

Third round results: Mayotte
Tie no	Home team (tier)	Score	Away team (tier)
1.	(Mayotte) FC Labattoir (R3)	1–0	VCO Vahibé (R3) (Mayotte)
2.	(Mayotte) N'Drema Club (R3)	1–1 (3–4 p)	Diables Noirs (R1) (Mayotte)
3.	(Mayotte) Maharavo FC (R3)	0–1	Enfants de Mayotte (R3)
4.	(Mayotte) FC Mtsakandro (R4)	2–2 (5–6 p)	USC Kangani (R3) (Mayotte)
5.	(Mayotte) AS Rosador (R1)	1–1 (3–1 p)	FC Mtsapéré (R1) (Mayotte)
6.	(Mayotte) Flamme d'Hajangoua (R4)	0–2	Feu du Centre (R4) (Mayotte)
7.	(Mayotte) AS Neige (R2)	3–0	USC Labattoir (R4) (Mayotte)
8.	(Mayotte) USCJ Koungou (R2)	1–1 (3–4 p)	AOE Chiconi (R3) (Mayotte)
9.	(Mayotte) FMJ Vahibé (R3)	0–1	Olympique de Miréréni (R2) (Mayotte)
10.	(Mayotte) Racine du Nord (R3)	0–1	AS Papillon d'Honneur (R4) (Mayotte)
11.	(Mayotte) VSS Hagnoudrou (R4)	2–2 (3–5 p)	AJ Kani-Kéli (R2) (Mayotte)
12.	(Mayotte) Pamandzi SC (R3)	5–0	ASJ Handréma (R3) (Mayotte)
13.	(Mayotte) Tsoundzou Sport Kwale (R4)	1–1 (8–9 p)	Enfant du Port (R4) (Mayotte)
14.	(Mayotte) Tchanga SC (R1)	0–1	ASJ Moinatrindri (R2) (Mayotte)
15.	(Mayotte) Miracle du Sud (R3)	1–2 (Note: FC Ylang de Koungou penalised for fielding too many transferred players, Miracle du Sud qualify.)	FC Ylang de Koungou (R3) (Mayotte)
16.	(Mayotte) ASC Abeilles (R1)	1–2	AS Sada (R1) (Mayotte)
17.	(Mayotte) Etincelles Hamjago (R3)	4–2	FC Dembeni (R2) (Mayotte)
18.	(Mayotte) CS M'ramadoudou (R4)	1–3	US Bandréle (R3) (Mayotte)
19.	(Mayotte) ASCEE Nyambadao (R4)	1–1 (1–3 p)	Foudre 2000 (R2) (Mayotte)
20.	(Mayotte) M'Tsanga 2000 (R4)	0–5	Bandrélé FC (R1) (Mayotte)
21.	(Mayotte) Espérance d'Iloni (R3)	1–1 (6–5 p)	Espoir Club de Longoni (R3) (Mayotte)
22.	(Mayotte) RC Barakani (R3)	1–1 (4–3 p)	Lance Missile (R4) (Mayotte)
23.	(Mayotte) AS Kahani (R4)	3–1	ASC Kaweni (R1) (Mayotte)
24.	(Mayotte) ACSJ M'Liha (R4)	3–1	FC Chiconi (R2) (Mayotte)
25.	(Mayotte) US Mtsangamboua (R3)	1–2	AS Bandraboua (R1) (Mayotte)
26.	(Mayotte) TCO Mamoudzou (R3)	0–1	USC Anteou Poroani (R1) (Mayotte)
27.	(Mayotte) Trévani SC (R4)	0–1	AS Jumeaux de M'zouazia (R1) (Mayotte)
28.	(Mayotte) AS Defense de Kawéni (R2)	3–1	Choungui FC (R3) (Mayotte)
29.	(Mayotte) FC Kani-Bé (R2)	1–3	FC Majicavo (R2) (Mayotte)
30.	(Mayotte) USJ Tsararano (R3)	2–1	US d'Acoua (R4) (Mayotte)
31.	(Mayotte) US Kavani (R2)	3–2	AJ Mtsahara (R2) (Mayotte)
32.	(Mayotte) UCS Sada (R2)	0–5	Espoir Mtsapéré (R3) (Mayotte)

Note: Mayotte League structure (no promotion to French League structure):
Régionale 1 (R1)
Régionale 2 (R2)
Régionale 3 (R3)
Régionale 4 (R4)

=== Round of 32 (Mayotte) ===
These matches were played on 13 and 14 August 2022.

Round of 32 results: Mayotte
Tie no	Home team (tier)	Score	Away team (tier)
1.	(Mayotte) AS Bandraboua (R1)	2–0 (Note: AS Bandraboua penalised, Foudre 2000 qualify.)	Foudre 2000 (R2) (Mayotte)
2.	(Mayotte) USC Kangani (R3)	2–3	AS Neige (R2) (Mayotte)
3.	(Mayotte) US Bandréle (R3)	2–4	Diables Noirs (R1) (Mayotte)
4.	(Mayotte) ASJ Moinatrindri (R2)	1–2	Pamandzi SC (R3) (Mayotte)
5.	(Mayotte) Espérance d'Iloni (R3)	1–1 (5–4 p)	AS Jumeaux de M'zouazia (R1) (Mayotte)
6.	(Mayotte) USJ Tsararano (R3)	0–5	AS Rosador (R1) (Mayotte)
7.	(Mayotte) AOE Chiconi (R3)	2–1	FC Labattoir (R3) (Mayotte)
8.	(Mayotte) Espoir Mtsapéré (R3)	0–1	AJ Kani-Kéli (R2) (Mayotte)
9.	(Mayotte) Olympique de Miréréni (R2)	0–0 (6–5 p)	Etincelles Hamjago (R3) (Mayotte)
10.	(Mayotte) Miracle du Sud (R3)	– (Note: No score recorded, Miracle du Sud qualified.)	Enfant du Port (R4) (Mayotte)
11.	(Mayotte) AS Kahani (R4)	1–0	US Kavani (R2) (Mayotte)
12.	(Mayotte) Feu du Centre (R4)	1–0	AS Papillon d'Honneur (R4) (Mayotte)
13.	(Mayotte) RC Barakani (R3)	1–1 (5–4 p)	AS Sada (R1) (Mayotte)
14.	(Mayotte) AS Defense de Kawéni (R2)	2–1	USC Anteou Poroani (R1) (Mayotte)
15.	(Mayotte) US Bandréle (R3)	4–2	ACSJ M'Liha (R4) (Mayotte)
16.	Enfants de Mayotte (R3)	2–2 (3–5 p)	FC Majicavo (R2) (Mayotte)

Note: Mayotte League structure (no promotion to French League structure):
Régionale 1 (R1)
Régionale 2 (R2)
Régionale 3 (R3)
Régionale 4 (R4)

=== Round of 16 (Mayotte) ===
These matches were played on 27 August 2022.

Round of 16 results: Mayotte
Tie no	Home team (tier)	Score	Away team (tier)
1.	(Mayotte) AS Kahani (R4)	0–1	Espérance d'Iloni (R3) (Mayotte)
2.	(Mayotte) FC Majicavo (R2)	2–1	AJ Kani-Kéli (R2) (Mayotte)
3.	(Mayotte) AS Defense de Kawéni (R2)	5–1	US Bandréle (R3) (Mayotte)
4.	(Mayotte) AOE Chiconi (R3)	1–1 (3–4 p)	AS Rosador (R1) (Mayotte)
5.	(Mayotte) AS Neige (R2)	2–2 (a.e.t.) (7–6 p)	RC Barakani (R3) (Mayotte)
6.	(Mayotte) Feu du Centre (R4)	0–2	Foudre 2000 (R2) (Mayotte)
7.	(Mayotte) Pamandzi SC (R3)	1–2	Diables Noirs (R1) (Mayotte)
8.	(Mayotte) Miracle du Sud (R3)	0–0 (5–4 p)	Olympique de Miréréni (R2) (Mayotte)

Note: Mayotte League structure (no promotion to French League structure):
Régionale 1 (R1)
Régionale 2 (R2)
Régionale 3 (R3)
Régionale 4 (R4)

=== Quarter final (Mayotte) ===
These matches were played on 10 September 2022.

Quarter final results: Mayotte
Tie no	Home team (tier)	Score	Away team (tier)
1.	(Mayotte) Espérance d'Iloni (R3)	0–1	Foudre 2000 (R2) (Mayotte)
2.	(Mayotte) Miracle du Sud (R3)	1–3	Diables Noirs (R1) (Mayotte)
3.	(Mayotte) AS Rosador (R1)	1–0	FC Majicavo (R2) (Mayotte)
4.	(Mayotte) AS Neige (R2)	0–0 (4–5 p)	AS Defense de Kawéni (R2) (Mayotte)

Note: Mayotte League structure (no promotion to French League structure):
Régionale 1 (R1)
Régionale 2 (R2)
Régionale 3 (R3)
Régionale 4 (R4)

=== Semi final (Mayotte) ===
These matches were played on 24 September 2022.

Semi final results: Mayotte
Tie no	Home team (tier)	Score	Away team (tier)
1.	(Mayotte) AS Defense de Kawéni (R2)	0–2	Diables Noirs (R1) (Mayotte)
2.	(Mayotte) Foudre 2000 (R2)	1–1 (3–4 p)	AS Rosador (R1) (Mayotte)

Note: Mayotte League structure (no promotion to French League structure):
Régionale 1 (R1)
Régionale 2 (R2)
Régionale 3 (R3)
Régionale 4 (R4)

=== Final (Mayotte) ===
This match was played on 15 October 2022.

Final results: Mayotte
Tie no	Home team (tier)	Score	Away team (tier)
1.	(Mayotte) Diables Noirs (R1)	5–2	AS Rosador (R1) (Mayotte)

Note: Mayotte League structure (no promotion to French League structure):
Régionale 1 (R1)
Régionale 2 (R2)
Régionale 3 (R3)
Régionale 4 (R4)

== Réunion ==
The first of the preliminary rounds in Réunion was drawn on or before 24 May 2022, and saw the entry of 8 clubs from Régional 1 and 12 clubs from Super 2, a newly created second-tier division. 6 clubs from Régional 1 were given byes. Subsequent draws were published only on the league's official Facebook page. The second preliminary round draw, named the fourth round by the league (to align with the main competition) was published on 10 June 2022. The fifth round draw was published on 31 August 2022. The sixth round draw was published on 1 October 2022.

=== First round (Réunion) ===
These matches were played on 26, 28 and 29 May 2022.

First round results: Réunion
Tie no	Home team (tier)	Score	Away team (tier)
1.	(Réunion) ASC Grands Bois (S2)	2–0	FC Parfin Saint-André (R1) (Réunion)
2.	(Réunion) ACF Piton Saint-Leu (S2)	3–2	AS Bretagne (S2) (Réunion)
3.	(Réunion) AS Sainte-Suzanne (R1)	6–0	Vincendo Sport (S2) (Réunion)
4.	(Réunion) OC Saint-André les Léopards (S2)	4–2	AS Marsouins (R1) (Réunion)
5.	(Réunion) SS Jeanne d'Arc (R1)	1–0	Entente Ravine Creuse (S2) (Réunion)
6.	(Réunion) AS Étoile du Sud (S2)	0–1	AS Capricorne (R1) (Réunion)
7.	(Réunion) OC Avirons (S2)	3–1	ASC Possession (S2) (Réunion)
8.	(Réunion) AS Red Star 2019 (S2)	0–1	Sainte-Rose FC (R1) (Réunion)
9.	(Réunion) Trois Bassins FC (R1)	1–2	SC Chaudron (S2) (Réunion)
10.	(Réunion) AF Saint-Louisien (R1)	1–0	FC Bagatelle Sainte-Suzanne (S2) (Réunion)

Note: Reúnion League structure (no promotion to French League structure):
Régional 1 (R1)
Super 2 (S2)

=== Fourth round (Réunion) ===
These matches were played on 17, 18 and 19 June 2022.

Fourth round results: Réunion
Tie no	Home team (tier)	Score	Away team (tier)
1.	(Réunion) JS Saint-Pierroise (R1)	2–0	OC Avirons (S2) (Réunion)
2.	(Réunion) ACF Piton Saint-Leu (S2)	0–2	Saint-Denis FC (R1) (Réunion)
3.	(Réunion) ASC Grands Bois (S2)	1–4	Saint-Pauloise FC (R1) (Réunion)
4.	(Réunion) La Tamponnaise (R1)	3–0	OC Saint-André les Léopards (S2) (Réunion)
5.	(Réunion) AS Excelsior (R1)	1–0	SC Chaudron (S2) (Réunion)
6.	(Réunion) AS Capricorne (R1)	0–1	US Sainte-Marienne (R1) (Réunion)
7.	(Réunion) AF Saint-Louisien (R1)	1–0	AS Sainte-Suzanne (R1) (Réunion)
8.	(Réunion) Sainte-Rose FC (R1)	1–2	SS Jeanne d'Arc (R1) (Réunion)

Note: Reúnion League structure (no promotion to French League structure):
Régional 1 (R1)
Super 2 (S2)

=== Fifth round (Réunion) ===
These matches were played on 17 and 18 September 2022.

Fifth round results: Réunion
Tie no	Home team (tier)	Score	Away team (tier)
1.	(Réunion) Saint-Denis FC (R1)	1–2	US Sainte-Marienne (R1) (Réunion)
2.	(Réunion) JS Saint-Pierroise (R1)	0–0 (a.e.t.) (3–2 p)	Saint-Pauloise FC (R1) (Réunion)
3.	(Réunion) SS Jeanne d'Arc (R1)	2–3	La Tamponnaise (R1) (Réunion)
4.	(Réunion) AF Saint-Louisien (R1)	0–1	AS Excelsior (R1) (Réunion)

Note: Reúnion League structure (no promotion to French League structure):
Régional 1 (R1)
Super 2 (S2)

=== Sixth round (Réunion) ===
These matches were played on 9 October 2022.

Sixth round results: Réunion
Tie no	Home team (tier)	Score	Away team (tier)
1.	(Réunion) AS Excelsior (R1)	0–1	La Tamponnaise (R1) (Réunion)
2.	(Réunion) US Sainte-Marienne (R1)	0–2	JS Saint-Pierroise (R1) (Réunion)

Note: Reúnion League structure (no promotion to French League structure):
Régional 1 (R1)
Super 2 (S2)

== French Guiana ==
On 5 July 2022, the league published the structure and the draw in full for the qualifying competition, in which 39 teams would compete. To maintain alignment with the mainland competition, qualifying began with the second round, where fourteen teams entered. The remaining 25 teams entered at the third round stage.

=== Second round (French Guiana) ===
These matches were played on 20, 27 and 28 August 2022.

Second round results: French Guiana
Tie no	Home team (tier)	Score	Away team (tier)
1.	(French Guiana) Kourou FC (R2)	0–4	ASC Rémire (R1) (French Guiana)
2.	(French Guiana) US Macouria (R2)	0–3	US Sinnamary (R1) (French Guiana)
3.	(French Guiana) ASC Ouest (R1)	0–1	Academy FC (R2) (French Guiana)
4.	(French Guiana) USC De Roura (R2)	0–3 (Note: Tie won by means of forfeit.)	PAC Maroni (R2) (French Guiana)
5.	(French Guiana) FC Family (none)	2–2 (3–5 p)	RC Maroni (R2) (French Guiana)
6.	(French Guiana) USL Montjoly (R1)	0–1	Loyola OC (R1) (French Guiana)
7.	(French Guiana) ASC Kawina (R2)	– (Note: Both teams forfeit the fixture.)	EJ Balaté (R2) (French Guiana)

Note: French Guiana League structure (no promotion to French League structure):
Régional 1 (R1)
Régional 2 (R2)

=== Third round (French Guiana) ===
These matches were played on 3 and 4 September 2022.

Third round results: French Guiana
Tie no	Home team (tier)	Score	Away team (tier)
1.	(French Guiana) ASU Grand Santi (R1)	12–1	ASC Arc-en-Ciel (R2) (French Guiana)
2.	(French Guiana) US Saint-Élie (R2)	0–17	SC Kouroucien (R1) (French Guiana)
3.	(French Guiana) Loyola OC (R1)	3–0 (Note: Tie won by means of forfeit.)	Cosma Foot (R2) (French Guiana)
4.	(French Guiana) ASC Karib (R1)	3–0	AJS Kourou (R2) (French Guiana)
5.	(French Guiana) Academy FC (R2)	4–2	ASCS Cogneau Lamirande (R2) (French Guiana)
6.	(French Guiana) US Sinnamary (R1)	4–2	ASC Armire (R2) (French Guiana)
7.	(French Guiana) Dynamo De Soula (R1)	1–3	Olympique Cayenne (R1) (French Guiana)
8.	(French Guiana) ASC Rémire (R1)	2–2 (4–1 p)	ASL Sport Guyanais (R2) (French Guiana)
9.	(French Guiana) EF Iracoubo (R1)	3–0	ASCS Maripasoula (R2) (French Guiana)
10.	(French Guiana) AJ Saint-Georges (R1)	– (Note: Walkover for AJ Saint-Georges, due to both sides from the previous round forfeiting. See Second round tie 7.)	walkover
11.	(French Guiana) PAC Maroni (R2)	0–11	Le Geldar De Kourou (R1) (French Guiana)
12.	(French Guiana) ASE Matoury (R1)	1–1 (4–3 p)	USC Montsinéry-Tonnegrande (R1) (French Guiana)
13.	(French Guiana) FC Charvein Mana (R1)	0–2	ASC Agouado (R1) (French Guiana)
14.	(French Guiana) FC Oyapock (R1)	1–0	Yana Sport Elite Academy (R2) (French Guiana)
15.	(French Guiana) RC Maroni (R2)	0–2	US de Matoury (R1) (French Guiana)
16.	(French Guiana) CSC Cayenne (R1)	1–0	AJ Balata Abriba (R2) (French Guiana)

Note: French Guiana League structure (no promotion to French League structure):
Régional 1 (R1)
Régional 2 (R2)

=== Fourth round (French Guiana) ===
These matches were played on 10, 11 and 14 September 2022.

Fourth round results: French Guiana
Tie no	Home team (tier)	Score	Away team (tier)
1.	(French Guiana) SC Kouroucien (R1)	0–2	ASU Grand Santi (R1) (French Guiana)
2.	(French Guiana) Loyola OC (R1)	1–1 (4–5 p)	ASC Karib (R1) (French Guiana)
3.	(French Guiana) Academy FC (R2)	1–4	US Sinnamary (R1) (French Guiana)
4.	(French Guiana) Olympique Cayenne (R1)	1–2	ASC Rémire (R1) (French Guiana)
5.	(French Guiana) EF Iracoubo (R1)	1–2	AJ Saint-Georges (R1) (French Guiana)
6.	(French Guiana) Le Geldar De Kourou (R1)	8–3	ASE Matoury (R1) (French Guiana)
7.	(French Guiana) ASC Agouado (R1)	7–0	FC Oyapock (R1) (French Guiana)
8.	(French Guiana) US de Matoury (R1)	1–1 (3–5 p)	CSC Cayenne (R1) (French Guiana)

Note: French Guiana League structure (no promotion to French League structure):
Régional 1 (R1)
Régional 2 (R2)

=== Fifth round (French Guiana) ===
These matches were played on 24 September 2022.

Fifth round results: French Guiana
Tie no	Home team (tier)	Score	Away team (tier)
1.	ASU Grand Santi (R1)	0–0 (6–5 p)	ASC Karib (R1)
2.	US Sinnamary (R1)	1–0	ASC Rémire (R1)
3.	AJ Saint-Georges (R1)	0–7	Le Geldar De Kourou (R1)
4.	CSC Cayenne (R1)	2–1	ASC Agouado (R1)

Note: French Guiana League structure (no promotion to French League structure):
Régional 1 (R1)
Régional 2 (R2)

=== Sixth round (French Guiana) ===
These matches were played on 8 October 2022.

Sixth round results: French Guiana
Tie no	Home team (tier)	Score	Away team (tier)
1.	ASU Grand Santi (R1)	1–0	US Sinnamary (R1)
2.	Le Geldar De Kourou (R1)	3–0	CSC Cayenne (R1)

Note: French Guiana League structure (no promotion to French League structure):
Régional 1 (R1)
Régional 2 (R2)

== Martinique ==
On 21 July 2022, the league published the draw for the first round of the qualifying competition, at the time labelled 1er Tour, but later referred to as 2e Tour, or second round. The 26 ties in this round, and the 6 byes required to form 16 ties in the next round, made for a total of 58 teams taking part in the qualifying competition.

Subsequent draws were only published on the leagues official Facebook page, usually just before the games took place. The third round draw was published on 1 September 2022. The fourth round draw was published on 14 September 2022. The fifth round draw was published on 4 October 2022. The sixth round draw was published on 17 October 2022.

=== Second round (Martinique) ===
These matches were played on 20, 21 and 23 August 2022.

Second round results: Martinique
Tie no	Home team (tier)	Score	Away team (tier)
1.	(Martinique) Golden Star de Fort-de-France (R1)	4–1	Espoir Sainte-Luce (R2) (Martinique)
2.	(Martinique) CS Case-Pilote (R1)	3–1	UJ Monnérot (R2) (Martinique)
3.	(Martinique) US Marinoise (R3)	0–4	RC Saint-Joseph (R1) (Martinique)
4.	(Martinique) AC Vert-Pré (R1)	2–4	AS Morne-des-Esses (R2) (Martinique)
5.	(Martinique) AS Samaritaine (R1)	12–0	New Star Ducos (R2) (Martinique)
6.	(Martinique) CO Dillon-Sainte Thérèse (R3)	1–9	US Robert (R1) (Martinique)
7.	(Martinique) Stade Spiritain (R2)	1–2	US Diamantinoise (R1) (Martinique)
8.	(Martinique) AS New Club (R1)	6–0	RC Rivière-Pilote (R2) (Martinique)
9.	(Martinique) Réveil Sportif (R2)	2–2	Assaut de Saint-Pierre (R1) (Martinique)
10.	(Martinique) Aiglon du Lamentin FC (R1)	4–3	CS Vauclinois (R2) (Martinique)
11.	(Martinique) ASC Môn Pito (R3)	0–3	Good Luck de Fort-de-France (R2) (Martinique)
12.	(Martinique) Solidarité de Lestrade (R3)	2–3	La Gauloise de Trinité (R2) (Martinique)
13.	(Martinique) Essor-Préchotain (R2)	3–0 (Note: Tie won by means of forfeit.)	UJ Redoute (R3) (Martinique)
14.	(Martinique) AS Silver Star (R3)	1–3	Réal Tartane (R2) (Martinique)
15.	(Martinique) FEP Monésie (R3)	1–1 (3–4 p)	JS Marigot (R3) (Martinique)
16.	(Martinique) US Riveraine (R2)	4–2	AS Étoile Basse-Pointe (R3) (Martinique)
17.	Futsal Académie Martinique (R3)	2–1	ASC Eudorçait-Fourniols (R3) (Martinique)
18.	(Martinique) ASC Emulation (R2)	3–0	RC Lorrain (R2) (Martinique)
19.	(Martinique) CS Bélimois (R3)	1–2	AS Excelsior (R2) (Martinique)
20.	(Martinique) ASC Hirondelle (R2)	2–2 (2–4 p)	Gri-Gri Pilotin FC (R3) (Martinique)
21.	(Martinique) JS Eucalyptus (R2)	0–2	Olympique Le Marin (R2) (Martinique)
22.	(Martinique) AS Éclair Rivière-Salée (R2)	9–0 (Note: Tie reversed from original draw.) (Note: Match abandoned, AS Éclair Rivière-Salée qualify.)	L'Intrépide Club (R3) (Martinique)
23.	ASPTT Martinique (R3)	– (Note: Both teams forfeited the tie.)	Étincelle Macouba (R3) (Martinique)
24.	(Martinique) Anses Arlets FC (R3)	2–2 (3–5 p)	Étendard Bellefontaine (R2) (Martinique)
25.	(Martinique) Éveil Les Trois Islets (R2)	5–1	SC Lamentin (R2) (Martinique)
26.	(Martinique) Santana Club (R2)	4–1	ASC Effort (R3) (Martinique)

Note: Martinique League structure (no promotion to French League structure):
Régionale 1 (R1)
Régionale 2 (R2)
Régionale 3 (R3)

=== Third round (Martinique) ===
These matches were played on 2, 3 and 4 September 2022.

Third round results: Martinique
Tie no	Home team (tier)	Score	Away team (tier)
1.	(Martinique) Club Franciscain (R1)	1–2	Golden Lion FC (R1) (Martinique)
2.	(Martinique) AS Éclair Rivière-Salée (R2)	2–2 (5–4 p)	US Diamantinoise (R1) (Martinique)
3.	(Martinique) Good Luck de Fort-de-France (R2)	1–2	AS Samaritaine (R1) (Martinique)
4.	(Martinique) AS Excelsior (R2)	1–2	Golden Star de Fort-de-France (R1) (Martinique)
5.	(Martinique) Réal Tartane (R2)	0–2	Aiglon du Lamentin FC (R1) (Martinique)
6.	(Martinique) AS Morne-des-Esses (R2)	1–1 (3–2 p)	US Robert (R1) (Martinique)
7.	(Martinique) Club Péléen (R1)	4–0	Santana Club (R2) (Martinique)
8.	(Martinique) Essor-Préchotain (R2)	0–1	AS New Club (R1) (Martinique)
9.	walkover	– (Note: Walkover for Assaut de Saint-Pierre due to both clubs forfeiting the fixture in the previous round (see second round tie 23))	Assaut de Saint-Pierre (R1) (Martinique)
10.	Futsal Académie Martinique (R3)	0–9	CS Case-Pilote (R1) (Martinique)
11.	(Martinique) La Gauloise de Trinité (R2)	1–4	ASC Emulation (R2) (Martinique)
12.	(Martinique) Gri-Gri Pilotin FC (R3)	0–1	CO Trénelle (R1) (Martinique)
13.	(Martinique) Olympique Le Marin (R2)	3–0	Étendard Bellefontaine (R2) (Martinique)
14.	(Martinique) US Riveraine (R2)	7–0	JS Marigot (R3) (Martinique)
15.	(Martinique) Club Colonial (R1)	6–0	Éveil Les Trois Islets (R2) (Martinique)
16.	(Martinique) RC Saint-Joseph (R1)	6–0	Océanic Club Le Lorrain (R2) (Martinique)

Note: Martinique League structure (no promotion to French League structure):
Régionale 1 (R1)
Régionale 2 (R2)
Régionale 3 (R3)

=== Fourth round (Martinique) ===
These matches were played on 14, 16, 17 and 27 September 2022.

Fourth round results: Martinique
Tie no	Home team (tier)	Score	Away team (tier)
1.	(Martinique) Golden Star de Fort-de-France (R1)	5–2	CS Case-Pilote (R1) (Martinique)
2.	(Martinique) Aiglon du Lamentin FC (R1)	5–1	AS Morne-des-Esses (R2) (Martinique)
3.	(Martinique) AS New Club (R1)	1–2	ASC Emulation (R2) (Martinique)
4.	(Martinique) Golden Lion FC (R1)	2–0	Club Colonial (R1) (Martinique)
5.	(Martinique) Olympique Le Marin (R2)	0–1	AS Éclair Rivière-Salée (R2) (Martinique)
6.	(Martinique) AS Samaritaine (R1)	2–1	US Riveraine (R2) (Martinique)
7.	(Martinique) Club Péléen (R1)	1–1 (2–4 p)	RC Saint-Joseph (R1) (Martinique)
8.	(Martinique) Assaut de Saint-Pierre (R1)	0–0 (3–4 p)	CO Trénelle (R1) (Martinique)

Note: Martinique League structure (no promotion to French League structure):
Régionale 1 (R1)
Régionale 2 (R2)
Régionale 3 (R3)

=== Fifth round (Martinique) ===
These matches were played on 4 and 5 October 2022.

Fifth round results: Martinique
Tie no	Home team (tier)	Score	Away team (tier)
1.	(Martinique) AS Éclair Rivière-Salée (R2)	1–3	Golden Lion FC (R1) (Martinique)
2.	(Martinique) Golden Star de Fort-de-France (R1)	0–2	Aiglon du Lamentin FC (R1) (Martinique)
3.	(Martinique) ASC Emulation (R2)	0–2	AS Samaritaine (R1) (Martinique)
4.	(Martinique) RC Saint-Joseph (R1)	0–2	CO Trénelle (R1) (Martinique)

Note: Martinique League structure (no promotion to French League structure):
Régionale 1 (R1)
Régionale 2 (R2)
Régionale 3 (R3)

=== Sixth round (Martinique) ===
These matches were played on 18 and 19 October 2022.

Sixth round results: Martinique
Tie no	Home team (tier)	Score	Away team (tier)
1.	(Martinique) Golden Lion FC (R1)	2–0	CO Trénelle (R1) (Martinique)
2.	(Martinique) Aiglon du Lamentin FC (R1)	1–1 (4–3 p)	AS Samaritaine (R1) (Martinique)

Note: Martinique League structure (no promotion to French League structure):
Régionale 1 (R1)
Régionale 2 (R2)
Régionale 3 (R3)

== Guadeloupe ==
On 25 July 2022, the league confirmed that 54 teams had entered from the territory, meaning that the competition would commence at the second round, and a number of teams from Régionale 1 would be exempt to the third round in order to have the correct number of clubs at that stage.

The second round fixtures were published on 19 August 2022, some time after the draw was made, with teams split into two groups. Similarly, the third round fixtures were published on 2 September 2022. The fourth round draw was published on 23 September 2022. The fifth round draw was published on 30 September 2022. The sixth round draw was published on 10 October 2022.

=== Second round (Guadeloupe) ===
These matches were played on various dates between 19 and 28 August 2022.

Second round results: Guadeloupe
Tie no	Home team (tier)	Score	Away team (tier)
1.	(Guadeloupe) CA Marquisat (R2)	4–0	AS Juventa (R3) (Guadeloupe)
2.	(Guadeloupe) AC Saint-Robert (R2)	0–3	L'Etoile de Morne-à-l'Eau (R1) (Guadeloupe)
3.	(Guadeloupe) L'Éclair de Petit-Bourg (R2)	0–2	ASG Juventus de Sainte-Anne (R1) (Guadeloupe)
4.	(Guadeloupe) Olympique Saint-Claudien (R3)	1–5 (Note: CS Capesterre-Belle-Eau penalised, Olympique Saint-Claudien qualify.)	CS Capesterre-Belle-Eau (R1) (Guadeloupe)
5.	(Guadeloupe) US Baie-Mahault (R1)	1–1 (7–6 p)	CS Moulien (R1) (Guadeloupe)
6.	(Guadeloupe) Rapid Club Petit-Canal (R2)	2–2 (1–3 p)	JS Vieux-Habitants (R1) (Guadeloupe)
7.	(Guadeloupe) US Cambrefort (R2)	1–1 (6–5 p)	OC Morne-à-l'Eau (R2) (Guadeloupe)
8.	(Guadeloupe) US Ansoise (R2)	3–2	JS Abymienne (R2) (Guadeloupe)
9.	(Guadeloupe) Stade Lamentinois (R1)	3–2	Amical Club Marie Galante (R2) (Guadeloupe)
10.	(Guadeloupe) USC de Bananier (R2)	1–1 (3–2 p)	AS Nenuphars (R3) (Guadeloupe)
11.	(Guadeloupe) Intrépide Sainte-Anne (R2)	2–2 (3–4 p)	ASC La Frégate (R2) (Guadeloupe)
12.	(Guadeloupe) AS Dragon (R2)	2–0	Zénith Morne-à-l'Eau (R2) (Guadeloupe)
13.	(Guadeloupe) Racing Club de Basse-Terre (R2)	1–0 (Note: Tie reversed from original draw.)	Association Juvenis (R2) (Guadeloupe)
14.	(Guadeloupe) AS Le Moule (R2)	4–0	CS Saint-François (R2) (Guadeloupe)
15.	(Guadeloupe) Résistance Bouillante (R2)	2–0	Jeuness Trois-Rivières (R3) (Guadeloupe)
16.	(Guadeloupe) US Grand-Bourg (R2)	0–2	Red Star (R1) (Guadeloupe)
17.	(Guadeloupe) Arsenal Club (R2)	0–1	JSC Marie Galante (R3) (Guadeloupe)
18.	(Guadeloupe) Unité Sainte-Rosienne (R2)	1–5	Union des Artistes de Raizet (R2) (Guadeloupe)
19.	(Guadeloupe) Colonial Club Baillif (R3)	2–0	AJ Saint-Félix (R2) (Guadeloupe)
20.	(Guadeloupe) CS Bouillantais (R2)	2–0	Mondial Club (R3) (Guadeloupe)
21.	(Guadeloupe) Cygne Noir (R2)	3–0 (Note: Tie won by means of forfeit.)	Saint-Louis AC (R3) (Guadeloupe)
22.	(Guadeloupe) Avenir Sainte-Rosien (R3)	1–2	Étoile Filante (R3) (Guadeloupe)
23.	(Guadeloupe) Granite FC (R3)	0–3	ASC Madiana (R2) (Guadeloupe)

Note: Guadeloupe League structure (no promotion to French League structure):
Ligue Régionale 1 (R1)
Ligue Régionale 2 (R2)
Ligue Régionale 3 (R3)

=== Third round (Guadeloupe) ===
These matches were played on 3 and 4 September 2022.

Third round results: Guadeloupe
Tie no	Home team (tier)	Score	Away team (tier)
1.	(Guadeloupe) ASG Juventus de Sainte-Anne (R1)	1–2	L'Etoile de Morne-à-l'Eau (R1) (Guadeloupe)
2.	(Guadeloupe) US Ansoise (R2)	1–2	La Gauloise de Basse-Terre (R1) (Guadeloupe)
3.	(Guadeloupe) JS Vieux-Habitants (R1)	0–1	Stade Lamentinois (R1) (Guadeloupe)
4.	(Guadeloupe) USC de Bananier (R2)	0–10	Solidarité-Scolaire (R1) (Guadeloupe)
5.	(Guadeloupe) US Baie-Mahault (R1)	3–1	US Cambrefort (R2) (Guadeloupe)
6.	(Guadeloupe) ASC La Frégate (R2)	1–1 (2–4 p)	Olympique Saint-Claudien (R3) (Guadeloupe)
7.	(Guadeloupe) AS Gosier (R1)	3–2	Jeunesse Evolution (R1) (Guadeloupe)
8.	(Guadeloupe) AO Gourbeyrienne (R1)	0–3	CA Marquisat (R2) (Guadeloupe)
9.	(Guadeloupe) Étoile Filante (R3)	2–5	Red Star (R1) (Guadeloupe)
10.	(Guadeloupe) ASC Madiana (R2)	2–2 (4–5 p)	Cygne Noir (R2) (Guadeloupe)
11.	(Guadeloupe) AS Le Moule (R2)	5–1	Résistance Bouillante (R2) (Guadeloupe)
12.	(Guadeloupe) Colonial Club Baillif (R3)	0–4	ASC Siroco Les Abymes (R1) (Guadeloupe)
13.	(Guadeloupe) Phare du Canal (R1)	8–2	CS Bouillantais (R2) (Guadeloupe)
14.	(Guadeloupe) JSC Marie Galante (R3)	2–4	SC Baie-Mahault (R1) (Guadeloupe)
15.	(Guadeloupe) Racing Club de Basse-Terre (R2)	2–1	AS Dragon (R2) (Guadeloupe)
16.	(Guadeloupe) Dynamo Le Moule (R1)	4–2	Union des Artistes de Raizet (R2) (Guadeloupe)

Note: Guadeloupe League structure (no promotion to French League structure):
Ligue Régionale 1 (R1)
Ligue Régionale 2 (R2)
Ligue Régionale 3 (R3)

=== Fourth round (Guadeloupe) ===
These matches were played between 23 and 27 September 2022.

Fourth round results: Guadeloupe
Tie no	Home team (tier)	Score	Away team (tier)
1.	(Guadeloupe) Stade Lamentinois (R1)	1–2	La Gauloise de Basse-Terre (R1) (Guadeloupe)
2.	(Guadeloupe) Olympique Saint-Claudien (R3)	0–4	L'Etoile de Morne-à-l'Eau (R1) (Guadeloupe)
3.	(Guadeloupe) AS Gosier (R1)	3–0	US Baie-Mahault (R1) (Guadeloupe)
4.	(Guadeloupe) Solidarité-Scolaire (R1)	8–0 (Note: Tie reversed from original draw.)	CA Marquisat (R2) (Guadeloupe)
5.	(Guadeloupe) Red Star (R1)	1–4	Dynamo Le Moule (R1) (Guadeloupe)
6.	(Guadeloupe) SC Baie-Mahault (R1)	1–1 (4–2 p)	AS Le Moule (R2) (Guadeloupe)
7.	(Guadeloupe) ASC Siroco Les Abymes (R1)	1–2	Phare du Canal (R1) (Guadeloupe)
8.	(Guadeloupe) Cygne Noir (R2)	1–1 (3–4 p)	Racing Club de Basse-Terre (R2) (Guadeloupe)

Note: Guadeloupe League structure (no promotion to French League structure):
Ligue Régionale 1 (R1)
Ligue Régionale 2 (R2)
Ligue Régionale 3 (R3)

=== Fifth round (Guadeloupe) ===
These matches were played on 1 and 2 October 2022.

Fifth round results: Guadeloupe
Tie no	Home team (tier)	Score	Away team (tier)
1.	(Guadeloupe) La Gauloise de Basse-Terre (R1)	0–2	Solidarité-Scolaire (R1) (Guadeloupe)
2.	(Guadeloupe) L'Etoile de Morne-à-l'Eau (R1)	3–2	AS Gosier (R1) (Guadeloupe)
3.	(Guadeloupe) Dynamo Le Moule (R1)	0–1	SC Baie-Mahault (R1) (Guadeloupe)
4.	(Guadeloupe) Racing Club de Basse-Terre (R2)	1–3	Phare du Canal (R1) (Guadeloupe)

Note: Guadeloupe League structure (no promotion to French League structure):
Ligue Régionale 1 (R1)
Ligue Régionale 2 (R2)
Ligue Régionale 3 (R3)

=== Sixth round (Guadeloupe) ===
These matches were played on 11 and 12 October 2022.

Sixth round results: Guadeloupe
Tie no	Home team (tier)	Score	Away team (tier)
1.	(Guadeloupe) Solidarité-Scolaire (R1)	0–0 (11–12 p)	L'Etoile de Morne-à-l'Eau (R1) (Guadeloupe)
2.	(Guadeloupe) Phare du Canal (R1)	1–1 (4–5 p)	SC Baie-Mahault (R1) (Guadeloupe)

Note: Guadeloupe League structure (no promotion to French League structure):
Ligue Régionale 1 (R1)
Ligue Régionale 2 (R2)
Ligue Régionale 3 (R3)

== Saint Pierre and Miquelon ==
The Overseas Collectivity of Saint Pierre and Miquelon has only three teams, so there is just one match in each of two rounds, with one team receiving a bye to the second round. Lots were drawn to decide which teams would receive the bye. The first round took place on 6 July 2022, and the second round took place on 23 July 2022. The winner gained entry to the third round draw of the Méditerrannée region.

=== First round (Saint Pierre and Miquelon) ===
The match was played on 6 July 2022.

First round results: Saint Pierre and Miquelon
Tie no	Home team (tier)	Score	Away team (tier)
1.	(Saint Pierre and Miquelon) A.S. Saint Pierraise	2–2 (4–5 p)	A.S. Îlienne Amateur (Saint Pierre and Miquelon)

=== Second round (Saint Pierre and Miquelon) ===
The match was played on 23 July 2022.

Second round results: Saint Pierre and Miquelon
Tie no	Home team (tier)	Score	Away team (tier)
1.	(Saint Pierre and Miquelon) A.S. Îlienne Amateur	0–0 (3–1 p)	A.S. Miquelonnaise (Saint Pierre and Miquelon)

== See also ==
- Overseas France teams in the main competition of the Coupe de France
