= 2025–26 Coupe de France preliminary rounds, overseas departments and territories =

The 2025–26 Coupe de France preliminary rounds, overseas departments and territories made up the qualifying competition to decide which teams from the French Overseas Departments and Territories took part in the main competition from the seventh round.

A total of eleven clubs qualified from the overseas leagues, two each from Guadeloupe, French Guiana, Martinique, Réunion, and one each from Mayotte, New Caledonia and Tahiti. Additionally, a team from Saint Pierre and Miquelon qualified for the third round, joining at that stage in the Nouvelle-Aquitaine region.

In 2024–25, RC Saint-Joseph of Martinique and Saint-Denis FC of Réunion both made it to the round of 32 in the main competition, before losing to Ligue 2 side SC Bastia and fifth-tier SU Dives-Cabourg respectively.

== Mayotte ==
On 29 April 2025, the league published the draw for the first round of the competition, named as the Framing Round. Featuring 34 teams from the fourth division of the league structure, this was scheduled to take place on 25 May 2025. The league published the second round draw (later referred to as the first round in results pages) on 4 June 2025. 21 ties were drawn, with eleven Régionale 1 teams, and eleven teams from other divisions being drawn to receive byes. Ties were scheduled to take place on 28 June 2025. The third round draw was published at the same time, with 12 ties drawn, and 20 teams drawn to receive byes. Ties were scheduled to take place on 19 July 2025. The draw for the round of 32 was published on 30 July 2025. Subsequent round draws were fixed at the same time.

=== Framing round (Mayotte) ===
These matches were played on 24 and 25 May 2025, with one replayed on 29 June 2025.

Framing round results: Mayotte
Tie no	Home team (Tier)	Score	Away team (Tier)
1.	(Mayotte) CS M'ramadoudou (R4)	0–1	US Ouangani (R4) (Mayotte)
2.	(Mayotte) AJ Bouyouni (R4)	0–2	M'Tsanga 2000 (R4) (Mayotte)
3.	(Mayotte) N'Drema Club (R4)	6–0	Ninga Club (R4) (Mayotte)
4.	(Mayotte) AS Ndranavi (R4)	1–2	M'Tsamboro FC (R4) (Mayotte)
5.	(Mayotte) Miracle du Sud (R4)	3–1	Enfant du Port (R4) (Mayotte)
6.	(Mayotte) ASCEE Nyambadao (R4)	not played (Note: Tornade Club de Majicavo-Lamir were barred from all competitions by the league, for non-payment of debts. ASCEE Nyambadao progressed to the next round.)	Tornade Club de Majicavo-Lamir (Mayotte)
7.	(Mayotte) FC Bambo (R4)	– (Note: FC Bambo, who originally raised a complaint with the league around the composition of the ASCE Mirereni team, were penalised by the league for not submitting the match sheet 15 days after the game. The scoreline of the fixture is not known.)	ASCE Mirereni (R4) (Mayotte)
8.	(Mayotte) ÉF Papillon Bleu (R4)	1–1 (1–4 p)	Espoir Club de Longoni (R4) (Mayotte)
9.	(Mayotte) ACSJ Alakarabu (R4)	1–4	ASSO Club Mirereni (R4) (Mayotte)
10.	(Mayotte) RC Barakani (R4)	1–1 (2–3 p)	AOE Chiconi (R4) (Mayotte)
11.	(Mayotte) TCO Mamoudzou (R4)	1–0	FC Passi M'Bouini (R4) (Mayotte)
12.	(Mayotte) CJ Mronabéja (R4)	0–3	Lance Missile (R4) (Mayotte)
13.	(Mayotte) ASC Wahadi	not played (Note: ASC Wahadi were barred from all competitions by the league, for non-payment of debts. Espoir Mtsapéré progressed to the next round.)	Espoir Mtsapéré (R4) (Mayotte)
14.	(Mayotte) US Mtsangamboua (R4)	1–1 (4–5 p)	Voulvavi Sport & Culture (R4) (Mayotte)
15.	(Mayotte) USJ Tsararano (R4)	not played (Note: AS Defense de Kawéni were barred from all competitions by the league, for non-payment of debts. USJ Tsararano progressed to the next round.)	AS Defense de Kawéni (Mayotte)
16.	(Mayotte) RC Tsimkoura (R4)	2–4 (Note: The game, originally played on 24 May 2025, was ordered to be replayed by the league after a discrepancy was discovered in the RC Tsimkoura teamsheet. The replay took place on 29 June 2025.)	ASJ Moinatrindri (R4) (Mayotte)
17.	(Mayotte) US M'Tsamoudou (R4)	1–3	AS Ongojou (R4) (Mayotte)

Note: Mayotte League Structure (no promotion to French League Structure):
Régionale 1 (R1)
Régionale 2 (R2)
Régionale 3 (R3)
Régionale 4 (R4)

=== First round (Mayotte) ===
These matches were played on 28 June 2025, with one delayed to 14 July 2025 pending a result from the previous round.

First round results: Mayotte
Tie no	Home team (Tier)	Score	Away team (Tier)
1.	(Mayotte) Maharavo FC (R3)	0–1	USC Labattoir (R2) (Mayotte)
2.	(Mayotte) USCJ Koungou (R3)	1–0	Pamandzi SC (R2) (Mayotte)
3.	(Mayotte) US Ouangani (R4)	2–1	Miracle du Sud (R4) (Mayotte)
4.	(Mayotte) FC Majicavo (R3)	1–0	Foudre 2000 de Dzoumogné (R2) (Mayotte)
5.	(Mayotte) ASJ Moinatrindri (R4)	1–0	AS Tour Eiffel (R3) (Mayotte)
6.	(Mayotte) ASCE Mirereni (R4)	1–0	AS Kahani (R3) (Mayotte)
7.	(Mayotte) ASC Abeilles (R2)	1–0	Enfants de Mayotte (R2)
8.	(Mayotte) ASSO Club Mirereni (R4)	1–3	Etincelles Hamjago (R2) (Mayotte)
9.	(Mayotte) VCO Vahibé (R3)	1–0	AS Ongojou (R4) (Mayotte)
10.	(Mayotte) FC Labattoir (R3)	4–2	ASJ Handréma (R2) (Mayotte)
11.	(Mayotte) Espoir Mtsapéré (R4)	2–0	TCO Mamoudzou (R4) (Mayotte)
12.	(Mayotte) Feu du Centre (R3)	1–1 (4–2 p)	ASCEE Nyambadao (R4) (Mayotte)
13.	(Mayotte) AS Neige (R3)	1–1 (6–7 p)	VSS Hagnoudrou (R3) (Mayotte)
14.	(Mayotte) Lance Missile (R4)	4–1	AS Papillon d'Honneur (R3) (Mayotte)
15.	(Mayotte) FC Dembeni (R2)	1–2	FC Shingabwé (R3) (Mayotte)
16.	(Mayotte) Tchanga FC (R3)	0–0 (5–4 p)	USC Anteou Poroani (R3) (Mayotte)
17.	(Mayotte) Racine du Nord (R3)	0–0 (5–6 p)	FC Chiconi (R3) (Mayotte)
18.	(Mayotte) AS Bandraboua (R3)	1–4	AS Rosador (R1) (Mayotte)
19.	(Mayotte) Voulvavi Sport & Culture (R4)	1–4	USJ Tsararano (R4) (Mayotte)
20.	(Mayotte) AOE Chiconi (R4)	0–1	Choungui FC (R2) (Mayotte)
21.	(Mayotte) Trévani SC (R3)	4–5	Olympique Mirereni (R3) (Mayotte)

Note: Mayotte League Structure (no promotion to French League Structure):
Régionale 1 (R1)
Régionale 2 (R2)
Régionale 3 (R3)
Régionale 4 (R4)

=== Third round (Mayotte) ===
These matches were played on 19 July 2025.

Third round results: Mayotte
Tie no	Home team (Tier)	Score	Away team (Tier)
1.	(Mayotte) VSS Hagnoudrou (R3)	2–0	VCO Vahibé (R3) (Mayotte)
2.	(Mayotte) AJ Mtsahara (R3)	1–2	AS Rosador (R1) (Mayotte)
3.	(Mayotte) ASJ Moinatrindri (R4)	2–2 (4–1 p)	Etincelles Hamjago (R2) (Mayotte)
4.	(Mayotte) AS Jumeaux de Mzouazia (R1)	3–1	ASC Abeilles (R2) (Mayotte)
5.	(Mayotte) FC Shingabwé (R3)	1–2	UCS Sada (R1) (Mayotte)
6.	(Mayotte) M'Tsamboro FC (R4)	0–1	FC Mtsapéré (R1) (Mayotte)
7.	(Mayotte) FC Labattoir (R3)	0–0 (3–4 p)	Tchanga FC (R3) (Mayotte)
8.	(Mayotte) Espoir Mtsapéré (R4)	0–4	Bandrélé FC (R1) (Mayotte)
9.	(Mayotte) N'Drema Club (R4)	0–1	Feu du Centre (R3) (Mayotte)
10.	(Mayotte) USJ Tsararano (R4)	1–1 (4–2 p)	FC Ylang de Koungou (R3) (Mayotte)
11.	(Mayotte) FC Chiconi (R3)	2–0	USC Kangani (R3) (Mayotte)
12.	(Mayotte) ASCE Mirereni (R4)	4–4 (5–6 p)	Choungui FC (R2) (Mayotte)

Note: Mayotte League Structure (no promotion to French League Structure):
Régionale 1 (R1)
Régionale 2 (R2)
Régionale 3 (R3)
Régionale 4 (R4)

=== Round of 32 (Mayotte) ===
These matches were played on 15, 16 and 17 August 2025.

Round of 32 results: Mayotte
Tie no	Home team (Tier)	Score	Away team (Tier)
1.	(Mayotte) FMJ Vahibé (R2)	0–1	AS Jumeaux de Mzouazia (R1) (Mayotte)
2.	(Mayotte) Choungui FC (R2)	2–1	Tchanga FC (R3) (Mayotte)
3.	(Mayotte) FC Majicavo (R3)	2–1	Lance Missile (R4) (Mayotte)
4.	(Mayotte) Feu du Centre (R3)	0–0 (2–4 p)	UCS Sada (R1) (Mayotte)
5.	(Mayotte) Espoir Club de Longoni (R4)	1–0	FC Mtsapéré (R1) (Mayotte)
6.	(Mayotte) US d'Acoua (R3)	0–2	ASC Kaweni (R1) (Mayotte)
7.	(Mayotte) USCJ Koungou (R3)	0–6	AS Rosador (R1) (Mayotte)
8.	(Mayotte) Olympique Mirereni (R3)	2–2 (2–4 p)	Espérance d'Iloni (R1) (Mayotte)
9.	(Mayotte) AS Sada (R2)	1–1 (4–5 p)	VSS Hagnoudrou (R3) (Mayotte)
10.	(Mayotte) ASJ Moinatrindri (R4)	2–3	FC Kani-Bé (R2) (Mayotte)
11.	(Mayotte) M'Tsanga 2000 (R4)	0–3	FC Chiconi (R3) (Mayotte)
12.	(Mayotte) Diables Noirs (R1)	1–0	AJ Kani-Kéli (R1) (Mayotte)
13.	(Mayotte) USJ Tsararano (R4)	0–1	USC Labattoir (R2) (Mayotte)
14.	(Mayotte) US Ouangani (R4)	1–3	Bandrélé FC (R1) (Mayotte)
15.	(Mayotte) FCO Tsingoni (R3)	0–0 (2–4 p)	ACSJ M'Liha (R1) (Mayotte)
16.	(Mayotte) FC Sohoa (R1)	1–1 (8–9 p)	US Kavani (R1) (Mayotte)

=== Round of 16 (Mayotte) ===
These matches were played on 5 and 6 September 2025.

Round of 16 results: Mayotte
Tie no	Home team (Tier)	Score	Away team (Tier)
1.	(Mayotte) US Kavani (R1)	1–2 (Note: Diables Noir penalised for fielding an ineligible player, US Kavani qualified.)	Diables Noirs (R1) (Mayotte)
2.	(Mayotte) AS Jumeaux de Mzouazia (R1)	2–0 (Note: Tie reversed from original draw.)	Choungui FC (R2) (Mayotte)
3.	(Mayotte) ASC Kaweni (R1)	1–1 (5–6 p)	Espérance d'Iloni (R1) (Mayotte)
4.	(Mayotte) Espoir Club de Longoni (R4)	0–0 (2–3 p)	UCS Sada (R1) (Mayotte)
5.	(Mayotte) VSS Hagnoudrou (R3)	3–4	Bandrélé FC (R1) (Mayotte)
6.	(Mayotte) FC Chiconi (R3)	1–0	FC Kani-Bé (R2) (Mayotte)
7.	(Mayotte) FC Majicavo (R3)	1–1 (6–5 p)	AS Rosador (R1) (Mayotte)
8.	(Mayotte) ACSJ M'Liha (R1)	3–2 (Note: ACSJ M'Liha penalised for fielding a suspended player, USC Labbatoir qualified.)	USC Labattoir (R2) (Mayotte)

=== Quarter final (Mayotte) ===
These matches were played on 13 September 2025.

Quarter final results: Mayotte
Tie no	Home team (Tier)	Score	Away team (Tier)
1.	(Mayotte) Bandrélé FC (R1)	1–0	US Kavani (R1) (Mayotte)
2.	(Mayotte) Espérance d'Iloni (R1)	2–1	UCS Sada (R1) (Mayotte)
3.	(Mayotte) USC Labattoir (R2)	2–3	AS Jumeaux de Mzouazia (R1) (Mayotte)
4.	(Mayotte) FC Majicavo (R3)	1–3	FC Chiconi (R3) (Mayotte)

=== Semi final (Mayotte) ===
These matches were played on 27 September 2025.

Semi final results: Mayotte
Tie no	Home team (Tier)	Score	Away team (Tier)
1.	(Mayotte) AS Jumeaux de Mzouazia (R1)	0–1 (Note: Tie reversed from original draw.)	Espérance d'Iloni' (R1) (Mayotte)
2.	(Mayotte) FC Chiconi (R3)	0–1	Bandrélé FC (R1) (Mayotte)

=== Final (Mayotte) ===
The match was played on 11 October 2025.

Final results: Mayotte
Tie no	Home team (Tier)	Score	Away team (Tier)
1.	(Mayotte) Espérance d'Iloni' (R1)	0–1	Bandrélé FC (R1) (Mayotte)

== Réunion ==
The league rules for this season specified that the qualifying competition would be open to teams from the top two divisions, Régionale 1 and Régionale 2. The draw for the opening round of the competition, referred to as the second round to align with the mainland convention, was published on 16 April 2025, with 24 ties drawn. The third round draw was published a week later, on 23 April 2025, with the remaining eight clubs entering at this stage. The fourth round draw was published on 25 June 2025. The fifth round draw was published on 20 August 2025. The sixth round draw was published on 8 October 2025.

=== Second round (Réunion) ===
These matches were played on 30 April and 1 May 2025.

Second round results: Réunion
Tie no	Home team (Tier)	Score	Away team (Tier)
1.	(Réunion) FC Ville de Saint-Philippe (R2)	1–0	OC Saint-André les Léopards (R2) (Réunion)
2.	(Réunion) FC du 17ème Km (R2)	0–6	ASC La Possession (R2) (Réunion)
3.	(Réunion) US Bénédictine (R2)	2–0	ASC Montgaillard (R2) (Réunion)
4.	(Réunion) US Sainte-Marienne (R2)	6–0	AS La Redoute (R2) (Réunion)
5.	(Réunion) ASC Makes (R2)	1–2	AS Bretagne (R2) (Réunion)
6.	(Réunion) SC Chaudron (R2)	1–2	AS Poudrière (R2) (Réunion)
7.	(Réunion) FC Parfin Saint-André (R2)	0–1	AS Étoile du Sud (R2) (Réunion)
8.	(Réunion) FC Rivière des Galets (R1)	1–0	Jean Petit FC (R2) (Réunion)
9.	(Réunion) AS Sainte-Suzanne (R2)	0–3	JS Sainte-Rosienne (R1) (Réunion)
10.	(Réunion) OC Avirons (R2)	2–1	JS Champ-Bornoise (R2) (Réunion)
11.	(Réunion) AF Saint-Louisien (R1)	8–0	SS Rivière Sport (R2) (Réunion)
12.	(Réunion) US Bellemène-Canot (R2)	2–0	AJS Saint-Denis (R2) (Réunion)
13.	(Réunion) Saint-Denis ÉFA (R2)	2–4	AS Capricorne (R2) (Réunion)
14.	(Réunion) Jeunesse Centre Ville Saint-Pierre (R2)	1–3	SC Bois-de-Nèfles (R2) (Réunion)
15.	(Réunion) AJ Petite-Île (R2)	1–3	FC Moufia (R2) (Réunion)
16.	(Réunion) AF La Possession (R2)	1–1 (3–1 p)	AJS Bois d'Olives (R2) (Réunion)
17.	(Réunion) Ravine Blanche Club (R2)	2–1	ASC Grands Bois (R2) (Réunion)
18.	(Réunion) FC Bagatelle Sainte-Suzanne (R2)	3–0	AS du 12ème Km (R2) (Réunion)
19.	(Réunion) Trois Bassins FC (R1)	7–0	AS Evêché (R2) (Réunion)
20.	(Réunion) AJS Rivière du Mât (R2)	1–4	FC La Ville Sainte-Suzanne (R2) (Réunion)
21.	(Réunion) OF Entre-Deux (R2)	4–1	AES La Convenance (R2) (Réunion)
22.	(Réunion) SS Jeanne d'Arc (R1)	6–0	JS Sainte-Annoise (R2) (Réunion)
23.	(Réunion) AS du Plate (R2)	2–2 (2–4 p)	CS Saint-Gilles (R2) (Réunion)
24.	(Réunion) AS Red Star 2019 (R2)	1–1 (4–2 p)	ACF Piton Saint-Leu (R1) (Réunion)

Note: Reúnion League Structure (no promotion to French League Structure):
Régional 1 (R1)
Régional 2 (R2)

=== Third round (Réunion) ===
These matches were played on 7, 8, 10 and 14 May 2025.

Third round results: Réunion
Tie no	Home team (Tier)	Score	Away team (Tier)
1.	(Réunion) AF La Possession (R2)	1–2	AS Saint-Louisienne (R1) (Réunion)
2.	(Réunion) US Bellemène-Canot (R2)	1–2	AS Excelsior (R1) (Réunion)
3.	(Réunion) OF Entre-Deux (R2)	2–1	US Bénédictine (R2) (Réunion)
4.	(Réunion) OC Avirons (R2)	1–0	Trois Bassins FC (R1) (Réunion)
5.	(Réunion) SC Bois-de-Nèfles (R2)	2–5	JS Sainte-Rosienne (R1) (Réunion)
6.	(Réunion) CS Saint-Gilles (R2)	1–3	AS Marsouins (R1) (Réunion)
7.	(Réunion) Ravine Blanche Club (R2)	0–0 (7–8 p)	AS Red Star 2019 (R2) (Réunion)
8.	(Réunion) FC Bagatelle Sainte-Suzanne (R2)	4–1	FC Rivière des Galets (R1) (Réunion)
9.	(Réunion) FC La Ville Sainte-Suzanne (R2)	0–0 (4–2 p)	AS Étoile du Sud (R2) (Réunion)
10.	(Réunion) SS Jeanne d'Arc (R1)	6–0	FC Moufia (R2) (Réunion)
11.	(Réunion) Saint-Denis FC (R1)	8–0	AS Poudrière (R2) (Réunion)
12.	(Réunion) ES Dominicaine (R1)	5–1	AS Bretagne (R2) (Réunion)
13.	(Réunion) AF Saint-Louisien (R1)	1–0	US Sainte-Marienne (R2) (Réunion)
14.	(Réunion) ASC La Possession (R2)	1–3	Saint-Pauloise FC (R1) (Réunion)
15.	(Réunion) JS Saint-Pierroise (R1)	9–0	AS Capricorne (R2) (Réunion)
16.	(Réunion) La Tamponnaise (R1)	5–0	FC Ville de Saint-Philippe (R2) (Réunion)

Note: Reúnion League Structure (no promotion to French League Structure):
Régional 1 (R1)
Régional 2 (R2)

=== Fourth round (Réunion) ===
These matches were played on 19 and 20 July 2025.

Fourth round results: Réunion
Tie no	Home team (Tier)	Score	Away team (Tier)
1.	(Réunion) JS Sainte-Rosienne (R1)	1–2	AS Saint-Louisienne (R1) (Réunion)
2.	(Réunion) FC La Ville Sainte-Suzanne (R2)	3–2	SS Jeanne d'Arc (R1) (Réunion)
3.	(Réunion) AS Marsouins (R1)	0–1	Saint-Pauloise FC (R1) (Réunion)
4.	(Réunion) La Tamponnaise (R1)	2–0	OF Entre-Deux (R2) (Réunion)
5.	(Réunion) AF Saint-Louisien (R1)	1–4	Saint-Denis FC (R1) (Réunion)
6.	(Réunion) FC Bagatelle Sainte-Suzanne (R2)	0–0 (4–2 p)	AS Excelsior (R1) (Réunion)
7.	(Réunion) JS Saint-Pierroise (R1)	2–0	AS Red Star 2019 (R2) (Réunion)
8.	(Réunion) OC Avirons (R2)	0–2	ES Dominicaine (R1) (Réunion)

Note: Reúnion League Structure (no promotion to French League Structure):
Régional 1 (R1)
Régional 2 (R2)

=== Fifth round (Réunion) ===
These matches were played on 6 and 7 September and 4 and 8 October 2025.

Fifth round results: Réunion
Tie no	Home team (Tier)	Score	Away team (Tier)
1.	(Réunion) JS Saint-Pierroise (R1)	3–0	FC La Ville Sainte-Suzanne (R2) (Réunion)
2.	(Réunion) AS Saint-Louisienne (R1)	0–3	ES Dominicaine (R1) (Réunion)
3.	(Réunion) Saint-Pauloise FC (R1)	0–0 (5–3 p)	La Tamponnaise (R1) (Réunion)
4.	(Réunion) FC Bagatelle Sainte-Suzanne (R2)	1–1 (4–3 p)	Saint-Denis FC (R1) (Réunion)

Note: Reúnion League Structure (no promotion to French League Structure):
Régional 1 (R1)
Régional 2 (R2)

=== Sixth round (Réunion) ===
These matches were played on 26 October 2025.

Sixth round results: Réunion
Tie no	Home team (Tier)	Score	Away team (Tier)
1.	(Réunion) JS Saint-Pierroise (R1)	1–1 (2–4 p)	ES Dominicaine (R1) (Réunion)
2.	(Réunion) FC Bagatelle Sainte-Suzanne (R2)	1–1 (3–5 p)	Saint-Pauloise FC (R1) (Réunion)

Note: Reúnion League Structure (no promotion to French League Structure):
Régional 1 (R1)
Régional 2 (R2)

== French Guiana ==
The draw for the opening round of the competition, named as the second round to align with the main competition, was published on 15 August 2025 by the league. Eight ties were drawn, in order to fix 16 ties in the third round, meaning 40 teams entered the competition. The third round draw was published by the league on 28 August 2025. The fourth round draw was published on 14 September 2025. Due to the spread of dates of the fourth round ties, the draws for the fifth and sixth rounds were published across two dates, 22 September and 6 October 2025.

=== Second round (French Guiana) ===
These matches were played between 23 August and 20 September 2025.

Second Round Results: French Guiana
Tie no	Home team (Tier)	Score	Away team (Tier)
1.	(French Guiana) AS La Joyeuse Montjoly (R2)	3–0 (Note: Tie won by means of forfeit.)	ASCS Maripasoula (R3) (French Guiana)
2.	(French Guiana) Aigles d'Or Mana (R1)	1–0	AS Grand Santi (R1) (French Guiana)
3.	(French Guiana) US Sinnamary (R1)	3–0	AFC Cayenne (R3) (French Guiana)
4.	(French Guiana) PAC Maroni (R3)	8–2	US Saint-Élie (R3) (French Guiana)
5.	(French Guiana) Cosma Foot (R1)	3–0	ASC Kawina (R3) (French Guiana)
6.	(French Guiana) FC Oyapock (R3)	4–2	ASC Rémire (R1) (French Guiana)
7.	(French Guiana) CSC de Cayenne (R1)	2–4	Loyola OC (R1) (French Guiana)
8.	(French Guiana) FC Charvein Mana (R2)	4–0	Fenix FC (R3) (French Guiana)

Note: French Guiana League Structure (no promotion to French League Structure):
Régional 1 (R1)
Régional 2 (R2)
Régional 3 (R3)

=== Third round (French Guiana) ===
These matches were played between 6 and 27 September 2025.

Third Round Results: French Guiana
Tie no	Home team (Tier)	Score	Away team (Tier)
1.	(French Guiana) SC Kouroucien (R2)	5–0	AJ Balata Abriba (R2) (French Guiana)
2.	(French Guiana) Yana Sport Elite Academy (R3)	3–0 (Note: Tie won by means of forfeit.)	AJ Saint-Georges (R2) (French Guiana)
3.	(French Guiana) US de Matoury (R1)	1–1 (3–2 p)	Aigles d'Or Mana (R1) (French Guiana)
4.	(French Guiana) ASC Ouest (R2)	3–0	US Macouria (R3) (French Guiana)
5.	(French Guiana) FC Oyapock (R3)	2–1	RC Maroni (R2) (French Guiana)
6.	(French Guiana) ASCS Cogneau Lamirande (R2)	0–8	AJS Kourou (R2) (French Guiana)
7.	(French Guiana) Olympique Cayenne (R1)	1–4	ASC Agouado (R1) (French Guiana)
8.	(French Guiana) EJ Balaté (R3)	0–3	FC Charvein Mana (R2) (French Guiana)
9.	(French Guiana) AS Saint-Laurent (R3)	1–2	ASL Sport Guyanais (R2) (French Guiana)
10.	(French Guiana) ASE Matoury (R1)	5–4	ASC Karib (R1) (French Guiana)
11.	(French Guiana) Loyola OC (R1)	2–2 (1–3 p)	Dynamo De Soula (R2) (French Guiana)
12.	(French Guiana) EF Iracoubo (R2)	1–4	ASC Armire (R1) (French Guiana)
13.	(French Guiana) AS La Joyeuse Montjoly (R2)	2–1	Academy FC (R2) (French Guiana)
14.	(French Guiana) PAC Maroni (R3)	9–1	USC Montsinéry-Tonnegrande (R2) (French Guiana)
15.	(French Guiana) Cosma Foot (R1)	2–2 (2–4 p)	ASC Le Geldar (R1) (French Guiana)
16.	(French Guiana) US Sinnamary (R1)	19–1	AFC Alawone (R3) (French Guiana)

Note: French Guiana League Structure (no promotion to French League Structure):
Régional 1 (R1)
Régional 2 (R2)
Régional 3 (R3)

=== Fourth round (French Guiana) ===
These matches were played between 20 September and 4 October 2025.

Fourth Round Results: French Guiana
Tie no	Home team (Tier)	Score	Away team (Tier)
1.	(French Guiana) AJS Kourou (R2)	0–3	SC Kouroucien (R2) (French Guiana)
2.	(French Guiana) ASC Agouado (R1)	1–2	ASC Armire (R1) (French Guiana)
3.	(French Guiana) US de Matoury (R1)	3–2	ASC Ouest (R2) (French Guiana)
4.	(French Guiana) Dynamo De Soula (R2)	1–4	ASE Matoury (R1) (French Guiana)
5.	(French Guiana) FC Oyapock (R3)	1–1 (4–3 p)	Yana Sport Elite Academy (R3) (French Guiana)
6.	(French Guiana) ASC Le Geldar (R1)	3–2	AS La Joyeuse Montjoly (R2) (French Guiana)
7.	(French Guiana) ASL Sport Guyanais (R2)	0–1	US Sinnamary (R1) (French Guiana)
8.	(French Guiana) FC Charvein Mana (R2)	2–0 (Note: Tie reversed from original draw.)	PAC Maroni (R3) (French Guiana)

Note: French Guiana League Structure (no promotion to French League Structure):
Régional 1 (R1)
Régional 2 (R2)
Régional 3 (R3)

=== Fifth round (French Guiana) ===
These matches were played on 4, 11 and 18 October 2025.

Fifth Round Results: French Guiana
Tie no	Home team (Tier)	Score	Away team (Tier)
1.	(French Guiana) ASC Armire (R1)	1–2	ASC Le Geldar (R1) (French Guiana)
2.	(French Guiana) ASE Matoury (R1)	6–0	SC Kouroucien (R2) (French Guiana)
3.	(French Guiana) FC Oyapock (R3)	1–3	US de Matoury (R1) (French Guiana)
4.	(French Guiana) US Sinnamary (R1)	2–1	FC Charvein Mana (R2) (French Guiana)

Note: French Guiana League Structure (no promotion to French League Structure):
Régional 1 (R1)
Régional 2 (R2)
Régional 3 (R3)

=== Sixth round (French Guiana) ===
These matches were played on 18 and 29 October 2025.

Sixth Round Results: French Guiana
Tie no	Home team (Tier)	Score	Away team (Tier)
1.	(French Guiana) US de Matoury (R1)	1–4	ASE Matoury (R1) (French Guiana)
2.	(French Guiana) ASC Le Geldar (R1)	1–0	US Sinnamary (R1) (French Guiana)

Note: French Guiana League Structure (no promotion to French League Structure):
Régional 1 (R1)
Régional 2 (R2)
Régional 3 (R3)

== Martinique ==
The draw for the first preliminary round, referred to as the second round to align with the rest of the competition, took place some time before 29 August 2025, with 22 ties drawn. The third round draw, including the ten teams given a bye until this stage, appeared online by 5 September 2025. From this stage, the draw was split into two halves. The draw for the fourth round took place on 16 September 2025. The fifth round draw took place on 6 October 2025. The sixth round paired the winners of the two fifth round matches in each half of the draw.

=== Second round (Martinique) ===
These matches were played on 29 and 30 August 2025.

Second Round Results: Martinique
Tie no	Home team (Tier)	Score	Away team (Tier)
1.	(Martinique) Stade Spiritain (R2)	2–4	CS Vauclinois (R2) (Martinique)
2.	(Martinique) Good Luck de Fort-de-France (R3)	2–4	Essor-Préchotain (R2) (Martinique)
3.	(Martinique) CS Case-Pilote (R2)	6–1	ASC Eudorçait-Fourniols (R3) (Martinique)
4.	(Martinique) FEP Monésie (R3)	0–0 (4–3 p)	Gri-Gri Pilotin FC (R3) (Martinique)
5.	(Martinique) Éveil Les Trois Islets (R2)	1–1 (5–3 p)	Réveil Sportif (R2) (Martinique)
6.	(Martinique) JS Eucalyptus (R2)	3–5	AC Vert-Pré (R2) (Martinique)
7.	(Martinique) Océanic Club Le Lorrain (R2)	0–3	AS Morne-des-Esses (R1) (Martinique)
8.	(Martinique) ASC Emulation (R1)	3–0	AS New Club (R2) (Martinique)
9.	(Martinique) Solidarité de Lestrade (R3)	3–11	RC Rivière-Pilote (R2) (Martinique)
10.	(Martinique) AS Silver Star (R3)	1–7	SC Lamentin (R2) (Martinique)
11.	(Martinique) UJ Monnérot (R2)	0–1	Futsal Académie Martinique (R2)
12.	(Martinique) Anses Arlets FC (R3)	1–10	Rapid Club Lorrain (R2) (Martinique)
13.	(Martinique) US Diamantinoise (R2)	2–2 (4–2 p)	AS Étoile Basse-Pointe (R2) (Martinique)
14.	(Martinique) ASC Effort (R2)	1–4	Olympique Le Marin (R2) (Martinique)
15.	(Martinique) AS Excelsior (R3)	0–9	Inter de Sainte-Anne (R1) (Martinique)
16.	(Martinique) New Star Ducos (R3)	2–5	US Robert (R1) (Martinique)
17.	(Martinique) ASC Môn Pito (R3)	1–2	AS Éclair Rivière-Salée (R2) (Martinique)
18.	(Martinique) ASC Hirondelle (R3)	0–3 (Note: Tie won by means of forfeit.)	La Gauloise de Trinité (R3) (Martinique)
19.	(Martinique) UJ Redoute (R3)	0–6	US Riveraine (R2) (Martinique)
20.	(Martinique) Assaut de Saint-Pierre (R2)	3–1	US Marinoise (R2) (Martinique)
21.	(Martinique) Réal Tartane (R2)	5–1	L'Intrépide Club (R3) (Martinique)
22.	(Martinique) Étendard Bellefontaine (R3)	0–3	JS Marigot (R3) (Martinique)

Note: Martinique League Structure (no promotion to French League Structure):
Régionale 1 (R1)
Régionale 2 (R2)
Régionale 3 (R3)

=== Third round (Martinique) ===
These matches were played on 5 and 6 September 2025.

Third Round Results: Martinique
Tie no	Home team (Tier)	Score	Away team (Tier)
1.	(Martinique) AS Morne-des-Esses (R1)	1–1 (5–4 p)	Club Franciscain (R1) (Martinique)
2.	(Martinique) CS Case-Pilote (R2)	3–0	Réal Tartane (R2) (Martinique)
3.	(Martinique) Club Péléen (R1)	2–0	ASC Emulation (R1) (Martinique)
4.	(Martinique) FEP Monésie (R3)	0–4	Golden Star de Fort-de-France (R1) (Martinique)
5.	(Martinique) Rapid Club Lorrain (R2)	0–1	US Diamantinoise (R2) (Martinique)
6.	(Martinique) SC Lamentin (R2)	0–5	Golden Lion FC (R1) (Martinique)
7.	(Martinique) AC Vert-Pré (R2)	1–0	Futsal Académie Martinique (R2)
8.	(Martinique) CS Vauclinois (R2)	1–2	AS Éclair Rivière-Salée (R2) (Martinique)
9.	(Martinique) Essor-Préchotain (R2)	0–3	Espoir Sainte-Luce (R1) (Martinique)
10.	(Martinique) La Gauloise de Trinité (R3)	0–0 (4–5 p)	Éveil Les Trois Islets (R2) (Martinique)
11.	(Martinique) Inter de Sainte-Anne (R1)	0–2	Club Colonial (R1) (Martinique)
12.	(Martinique) Olympique Le Marin (R2)	1–1 (3–1 p)	Assaut de Saint-Pierre (R2) (Martinique)
13.	(Martinique) RC Rivière-Pilote (R2)	1–1 (5–4 p)	Aiglon du Lamentin FC (R1) (Martinique)
14.	(Martinique) US Riveraine (R2)	10–0	JS Marigot (R3) (Martinique)
15.	(Martinique) US Robert (R1)	1–5	CO Trénelle (R1) (Martinique)
16.	(Martinique) AS Samaritaine (R1)	0–1	RC Saint-Joseph (R1) (Martinique)

Note: Martinique League Structure (no promotion to French League Structure):
Régionale 1 (R1)
Régionale 2 (R2)
Régionale 3 (R3)

=== Fourth round (Martinique) ===
These matches were played on 3 and 4 October 2025.

Fourth Round Results: Martinique
Tie no	Home team (Tier)	Score	Away team (Tier)
1.	(Martinique) CO Trénelle (R1)	0–0 (6–7 p)	Éveil Les Trois Islets (R2) (Martinique)
2.	(Martinique) AS Éclair Rivière-Salée (R2)	5–0 (Note: Tie reversed from original draw.)	AC Vert-Pré (R2) (Martinique)
3.	(Martinique) Golden Star de Fort-de-France (R1)	2–2 (6–5 p)	RC Rivière-Pilote (R2) (Martinique)
4.	(Martinique) Golden Lion FC (R1)	2–0	AS Morne-des-Esses (R1) (Martinique)
5.	(Martinique) CS Case-Pilote (R2)	3–2	Olympique Le Marin (R2) (Martinique)
6.	(Martinique) RC Saint-Joseph (R1)	1–0	Club Péléen (R1) (Martinique)
7.	(Martinique) Club Colonial (R1)	6–0	US Riveraine (R2) (Martinique)
8.	(Martinique) US Diamantinoise (R2)	1–3	Espoir Sainte-Luce (R1) (Martinique)

Note: Martinique League Structure (no promotion to French League Structure):
Régionale 1 (R1)
Régionale 2 (R2)
Régionale 3 (R3)

=== Fifth round (Martinique) ===
These matches were played on 14 and 15 October 2025, with one replayed on 31 October 2025.

Fifth Round Results: Martinique
Tie no	Home team (Tier)	Score	Away team (Tier)
1.	(Martinique) Club Colonial (R1)	3–0	RC Saint-Joseph (R1) (Martinique)
2.	(Martinique) Espoir Sainte-Luce (R1)	4–3	CS Case-Pilote (R2) (Martinique)
3.	(Martinique) Éveil Les Trois Islets (R2)	2–0 (Note: The match on 15 October 2025 ended 1–0, but a challenge was raised by AS Éclair Rivière-Salée regarding the registration of a player. After an appeal, the league ordered the match to be replayed without the player concerned on 31 October 2025.)	AS Éclair Rivière-Salée (R2) (Martinique)
4.	(Martinique) Golden Star de Fort-de-France (R1)	1–0	Golden Lion FC (R1) (Martinique)

Note: Martinique League Structure (no promotion to French League Structure):
Régionale 1 (R1)
Régionale 2 (R2)
Régionale 3 (R3)

=== Sixth round (Martinique) ===
These matches were played on 30 October and 4 November 2025.

Sixth Round Results: Martinique
Tie no	Home team (Tier)	Score	Away team (Tier)
1.	(Martinique) Club Colonial (R1)	2–2 (6–7 p)	Espoir Sainte-Luce (R1) (Martinique)
2.	(Martinique) Éveil Les Trois Islets (R2)	2–2 (3–2 p)	Golden Star de Fort-de-France (R1) (Martinique)

Note: Martinique League Structure (no promotion to French League Structure):
Régionale 1 (R1)
Régionale 2 (R2)
Régionale 3 (R3)

== Guadeloupe ==
The draw for the opening round of the competition, named as the second round to align with the main competition, was published on the league's Facebook page on 14 August 2025, with 17 ties drawn, featuring teams from the second and third levels of football in Guadeloupe. The third round draw first appeared on the league's Facebook page on 12 September 2025, with 16 ties draws, and the remaining teams from the region, and the team from the Collectivity of Saint Martin entering at this stage. The fourth round draw appeared on the league's Facebook page on 26 September 2025. The fifth round draw was made public on the league's Facebook page on 10 October 2025. The sixth round pairings were published on 24 October 2025.

=== Second round (Guadeloupe) ===
These matches were played on various dates between 23 and 31 August 2025.

Second Round Results: Guadeloupe
Tie no	Home team (Tier)	Score	Away team (Tier)
1.	(Guadeloupe) CS Capesterre-Belle-Eau (R2)	3–2	Résistance Bouillante (R2) (Guadeloupe)
2.	(Guadeloupe) Amical Club Marie Galante (R2)	1–1 (2–4 p)	ASC Équinoxe (R2) (Guadeloupe)
3.	(Guadeloupe) JS Vieux-Habitants (R2)	1–0	AS Dragon (R2) (Guadeloupe)
4.	(Guadeloupe) AS Juventa (R3)	3–1	USC de Bananier (R3) (Guadeloupe)
5.	(Guadeloupe) Jeunesse Vieux-Fort (R3)	0–4 (Note: ASG Juventus de Sainte-Anne penalised, Jeunesse Vieux-Fort qualified.)	ASG Juventus de Sainte-Anne (R2) (Guadeloupe)
6.	(Guadeloupe) L'Éclair de Petit-Bourg (R3)	1–1 (4–2 p)	Granite FC (R3) (Guadeloupe)
7.	(Guadeloupe) Solidarité-Scolaire (R2)	4–3	CS Bouillantais (R3) (Guadeloupe)
8.	(Guadeloupe) ASC La Frégate (R2)	1–1 (2–4 p)	US Baie-Mahault (R2) (Guadeloupe)
9.	(Guadeloupe) JS Abymienne (R3)	0–3	Red Star (R2) (Guadeloupe)
10.	(Guadeloupe) ASC Madiana (R2)	4–1	AJ Saint-Félix (R3) (Guadeloupe)
11.	(Guadeloupe) AJ Castel (R3)	1–2	Mondial Club (R3) (Guadeloupe)
12.	(Guadeloupe) US Ansoise (R2)	0–4	Phare du Canal (R2) (Guadeloupe)
13.	(Guadeloupe) Union des Artistes de Raizet (R2)	2–1	CS Saint-François (R2) (Guadeloupe)
14.	(Guadeloupe) Association Juvenis (R2)	3–0	Unité Sainte-Rosienne (R3) (Guadeloupe)
15.	(Guadeloupe) Étoile Filante (R2)	2–2 (4–5 p)	OC Morne-à-l'Eau (R3) (Guadeloupe)
16.	(Guadeloupe) Racing Club de Basse-Terre (R2)	3–0	AS Nénuphars (R2) (Guadeloupe)
17.	(Guadeloupe) Rapid Club Petit-Canal (R3)	0–1	JSC Marie Galante (R2) (Guadeloupe)

Note: Guadeloupe League Structure (no promotion to French League Structure):
Ligue Régionale 1 (R1)
Ligue Régionale 2 (R2)
Ligue Régionale 3 (R3)

=== Third round (Guadeloupe) ===
These matches were played on 12, 13 and 14 September 2025.

Third Round Results: Guadeloupe
Tie no	Home team (Tier)	Score	Away team (Tier)
1.	(Guadeloupe) ASC Madiana (R2)	1–5	SC Baie-Mahault (R1) (Guadeloupe)
2.	(Guadeloupe) Phare du Canal (R2)	2–0	OC Morne-à-l'Eau (R3) (Guadeloupe)
3.	(Guadeloupe) Arsenal Club (R1)	1–2	L'Étoile de Morne-à-l'Eau (R1) (Guadeloupe)
4.	(Guadeloupe) La Gauloise de Basse-Terre (R1)	5–1	CS Capesterre-Belle-Eau (R2) (Guadeloupe)
5.	(Guadeloupe) JS Vieux-Habitants (R2)	2–0	Solidarité-Scolaire (R2) (Guadeloupe)
6.	(Guadeloupe) CA Marquisat (R1)	3–1	US Baie-Mahault (R2) (Guadeloupe)
7.	(Guadeloupe) Racing Club de Basse-Terre (R2)	3–1	Union des Artistes de Raizet (R2) (Guadeloupe)
8.	(Guadeloupe) AS Gosier (R1)	1–1 (4–1 p)	AS Le Moule (R1) (Guadeloupe)
9.	(Guadeloupe) Red Star (R2)	1–3	ASC Siroco Les Abymes (R1) (Guadeloupe)
10.	(Guadeloupe) AS Juventa (R3)	0–7	Stade Lamentinois (R1) (Guadeloupe)
11.	(Guadeloupe) ASC Équinoxe (R2)	3–0	Jeuness Trois-Rivières (R3) (Guadeloupe)
12.	(Guadeloupe) Dynamo Le Moule (R1)	1–1 (4–5 p) (Note: Junior Stars FC penalised for fielding too many transferred players, Dynamo Le Moule qualified.)	Junior Stars FC (R1 Saint-Martin) (Collectivity of Saint Martin)
13.	(Guadeloupe) Jeunesse Vieux-Fort (R3)	0–4	AN Jeunesse Évolution (R1) (Guadeloupe)
14.	(Guadeloupe) L'Éclair de Petit-Bourg (R3)	0–7	CS Moulien (R1) (Guadeloupe)
15.	(Guadeloupe) JSC Marie Galante (R2)	3–3 (4–5 p)	Association Juvenis (R2) (Guadeloupe)
16.	(Guadeloupe) Mondial Club (R3)	0–6	AO Gourbeyrienne (R1) (Guadeloupe)

Note: Guadeloupe League Structure (no promotion to French League Structure):
Ligue Régionale 1 (R1)
Ligue Régionale 2 (R2)
Ligue Régionale 3 (R3)

=== Fourth round (Guadeloupe) ===
These matches were played between 26 and 30 September 2025.

Fourth Round Results: Guadeloupe
Tie no	Home team (Tier)	Score	Away team (Tier)
1.	(Guadeloupe) L'Étoile de Morne-à-l'Eau (R1)	0–2	SC Baie-Mahault (R1) (Guadeloupe)
2.	(Guadeloupe) CA Marquisat (R1)	1–1 (1–3 p)	JS Vieux-Habitants (R2) (Guadeloupe)
3.	(Guadeloupe) AN Jeunesse Évolution (R1)	2–0	ASC Équinoxe (R2) (Guadeloupe)
4.	(Guadeloupe) Phare du Canal (R2)	1–3	AS Gosier (R1) (Guadeloupe)
5.	(Guadeloupe) Stade Lamentinois (R1)	1–2	La Gauloise de Basse-Terre (R1) (Guadeloupe)
6.	(Guadeloupe) AO Gourbeyrienne (R1)	0–0 (3–1 p)	Racing Club de Basse-Terre (R2) (Guadeloupe)
7.	(Guadeloupe) Association Juvenis (R2)	0–4	Dynamo Le Moule (R1) (Guadeloupe)
8.	(Guadeloupe) CS Moulien (R1)	3–2	ASC Siroco Les Abymes (R1) (Guadeloupe)

Note: Guadeloupe League Structure (no promotion to French League Structure):
Ligue Régionale 1 (R1)
Ligue Régionale 2 (R2)
Ligue Régionale 3 (R3)

=== Fifth round (Guadeloupe) ===
These matches were played between 10, 11 and 14 October 2025.

Fifth Round Results: Guadeloupe
Tie no	Home team (Tier)	Score	Away team (Tier)
1.	(Guadeloupe) CS Moulien (R1)	1–1 (3–2 p)	AN Jeunesse Évolution (R1) (Guadeloupe)
2.	(Guadeloupe) JS Vieux-Habitants (R2)	0–3	La Gauloise de Basse-Terre (R1) (Guadeloupe)
3.	(Guadeloupe) AS Gosier (R1)	0–0 (8–7 p)	AO Gourbeyrienne (R1) (Guadeloupe)
4.	(Guadeloupe) Dynamo Le Moule (R1)	2–0	SC Baie-Mahault (R1) (Guadeloupe)

Note: Guadeloupe League Structure (no promotion to French League Structure):
Ligue Régionale 1 (R1)
Ligue Régionale 2 (R2)
Ligue Régionale 3 (R3)

=== Sixth round (Guadeloupe) ===
These matches were played on 26 and 31 October 2025.

Sixth Round Results: Guadeloupe
Tie no	Home team (Tier)	Score	Away team (Tier)
1.	(Guadeloupe) La Gauloise de Basse-Terre (R1)	0–1	CS Moulien (R1) (Guadeloupe)
2.	(Guadeloupe) AS Gosier (R1)	3–1	Dynamo Le Moule (R1) (Guadeloupe)

Note: Guadeloupe League Structure (no promotion to French League Structure):
Ligue Régionale 1 (R1)
Ligue Régionale 2 (R2)
Ligue Régionale 3 (R3)

== Saint Pierre and Miquelon ==
The Overseas Collectivity of Saint Pierre and Miquelon has only three teams, so there is just one match in each of two rounds, with one team receiving a bye to the second round. The draw for the first round was made on December 16, 2024. The first round took place on 5 July 2025, and the second round took place on 20 July 2025. The winner gained entry to the third round draw of the Nouvelle-Aquitaine region.

=== First round (Saint Pierre and Miquelon) ===
This match was played on 5 July 2025.

First Round Result : Saint Pierre and Miquelon
Tie no	Home team (Tier)	Score	Away team (Tier)
1.	(Saint Pierre and Miquelon) AS Saint Pierraise	6–1	AS Îlienne Amateur (Saint Pierre and Miquelon)

=== Second round (Saint Pierre and Miquelon) ===
This match was played on 20 July 2025.

Second Round Result : Saint Pierre and Miquelon
Tie no	Home team (Tier)	Score	Away team (Tier)
2.	(Saint Pierre and Miquelon) AS Saint Pierraise	0–0 (5–4 p)	AS Miquelonnaise (Saint Pierre and Miquelon)
