= List of football clubs in Guadeloupe =

This is a list of association football clubs in Guadeloupe, a French overseas region in the Caribbean.

== The football clubs ==
- AJSS Saintes
- Amical Club (Grand-Bourg de Marie Galante)
- AS Dragon (Gosier)
- CS Moulien
- Evolucas (Lamentin)
- JS Vieux-Habitants
- Juventus SA (Sainte-Anne)
- La Gauloise (Basse-Terre)
- L'Etoile de Morne-à-l'Eau
- Phare Petit-Canal
- Red Star (Baie Mahault)
- Siroco (Abymes)
- Stade Lamentinois (Lamentin)
- USR Sainte-Rose
