= 2021–22 Guadeloupe Division of Honor =

Guadeloupe Division of Honor
- Season: 2021–22

The 2021–22 Guadeloupe Division of Honor season is the 71st season of the league. The defending champions, AS Gosier, are vying in Group B for their 3rd title and their 3rd consecutive one.

== League table ==
=== Group A ===
Points:Win:4 Draw:2 Loss:1

Pos	Team	Pld	W	D	L	GF	GA	GD	Pts	Qualification or relegation
1	L'Etoile	9	5	3	1	16	8	+8	27	Semi-Final
2	Jeunesse	10	4	5	1	14	10	+4	27	Semi-Final
3	La Gauloise	10	5	1	4	15	12	+3	26	
4	Phare du Canal	10	4	3	3	16	9	+7	25	
5	Stade Lamentois	9	4	1	4	15	14	+1	22	
6	Juventus	10	3	2	5	9	11	−2	21	
7	Red Star Guadeloupe	10	3	2	5	11	22	−11	21	
8	Baie-Mahault	9	3	2	4	13	17	−4	20	Relegation Play-off
9	Amical	9	2	4	3	7	7	0	19	Relegation Play-off
10	Arsenal	8	1	3	4	6	12	−6	14	Relegation

Updated to match(es) played on March 12th 2022.

=== Group B ===
Points:Win:4 Draw:2 Loss:1

Pos	Team	Pld	W	D	L	GF	GA	GD	Pts	Qualification or relegation
1	CS Moulien	10	7	3	0	25	2	+23	34	Semi-Final
2	AS Gosier	10	6	4	0	27	7	+20	32	Semi-Final
3	Solidarité-Scolaire	9	6	2	1	26	7	+19	29	
4	JS Vieux-Habitants	10	4	2	4	20	13	+7	24	
5	Siroco Les Abymes	10	4	2	4	17	18	−1	24	
6	Marquisat	10	3	2	5	19	27	−8	21	
7	CERFA	8	2	1	5	12	24	−12	15	
8	US Baie-Mahault	6	2	1	3	9	17	−8	13	Relegation Play-off
9	USR Sainte-Rose	8	0	2	6	1	28	−27	10	Relegation Play-off
10	Racing Club de Basse-Terre	7	0	1	6	4	17	−13	8	Relegation

Updated to match(es) played on March 12th 2022.
