= Jean-Luc Lambourde =

French footballer (born 1980)

Personal information
- Date of birth: 10 April 1980 (age 46)
- Place of birth: Guadeloupe
- Height: 1.94 m (6 ft 4 in)
- Positions: Centre-back; defensive midfielder

Team information
- Current team: Amical Club (manager)

Senior career*
Years	Team	Apps	(Gls)
2002–2005	Avion	44	(6)
2005–2014	Amical Club		
2014–2015	CS Moulien		
2015–?	Amical Club		

International career
2002–2017	Guadeloupe	65	(15)

Managerial career
- Amical Club
Medal record
Men's football
Representing Guadeloupe
Caribbean Cup
Runner-up	2010 Martinique
Third place	2008 Jamaica
- * Club domestic league appearances and goals

Jean-Luc Lambourde (born 10 April 1980) is a French football manager and former player who manages Guadeloupe Division d'Honneur club Amical Club. He is a former member of the Guadeloupe national team. He is one of a few players in the team to have participated in all three of the team's appearances as the CONCACAF Gold Cup.

== Playing career ==
A centre-back or defensive midfielder, Lambourde began his career playing for amateur club Avion in 2002. After spending three seasons with the club, Lambourde ventured to his native homeland joining Amical Club. In his second season with the club, he won the Coupe de Guadeloupe.

While at Amical Club, Lambourde had been twice voted player of the month by February 2008. In June 2009 he scored the decisive goal in Amical Club's 1–0 win against La Gauloise, keeping his club in the Guadeloupe Division d'Honneur. He had turned down a call-up from the France national beach soccer team to play the match. In November he scored two goals while Amical Club lost 3–2 against Championnat de France Amateur 2 side Vendée Poiré-sur-Vie Football in the 7th round of the 2009–10 Coupe de France.

== Managerial career ==
As Amical Club manager, Lambourde suffered relegation from the Guadeloupe Division d'Honneur in the 2021–22 season. On 7 September 2022 he won the Coupe de Guadeloupe with Amical Club, beating reigning Guadeloupean champions and cup title holders Solidarité-Scolaire in the final after a penalty shootout.

== Personal life ==
Former Bordeaux and Chelsea player Bernard Lambourde is his cousin.

== Career statistics ==
Appearances and goals by national team and year
National team	Year	Apps	Goals
Guadeloupe	2002	4	1
Guadeloupe	2003	3	0
Guadeloupe	2005	1	0
Guadeloupe	2006	5	2
Guadeloupe	2007	11	3
Guadeloupe	2008	12	3
Guadeloupe	2009	2	0
Guadeloupe	2010	14	5
Guadeloupe	2011	3	0
Guadeloupe	2012	9	1
Guadeloupe	2017	1	0
Total		65	15

Scores and results list Guadeloupe's goal tally first. The score column indicates the score after each Lambourde goal.

List of international goals scored by Jean-Luc Lambourde
No.	Date	Venue	Opponent	Score	Result	Competition	Ref.
1	9 November 2002	Grenada National Stadium, St. George's, Grenada	Grenada	4–3	5–4	2003 CONCACAF Gold Cup qualification	
2	20 September 2006	Stade René Serge Nabajoth, Les Abymes, Guadeloupe	Saint-Martin	1–0	1–0	2007 Caribbean Cup qualification	
3	28 November 2006	Georgetown Cricket Club, Georgetown, Guyana	Antigua and Barbuda	2–0	3–1	2007 Caribbean Cup qualification	
4	16 January 2007	Manny Ramjohn Stadium, Marabella, Trinidad and Tobago	Guyana	2–1	3–4	2007 Caribbean Cup	
5	20 January 2007	Hasely Crawford Stadium, Port of Spain, Trinidad and Tobago	Haiti	1–3	1–3	2007 Caribbean Cup	
6	17 May 2007	Morne-à-l'Eau, Guadeloupe	Dominica	1–0	2–0	Friendly	
7	27 September 2008	Stade Municipal, Melun, France	* (France) New Caledonia	4–0	4–0	2008 Coupe de l'Outre-Mer	
8	3 October 2008	Stade Marville, La Courneuve, France	French Guiana	2–0	4–0	2008 Coupe de l'Outre-Mer	
9	6 December 2008	Greenfield Stadium, Trelawny, Jamaica	Haiti	3–2	3–2	2008 Caribbean Cup	
10	23 September 2010	Maisons Rouges, Bry-sur-Marne, France	* (France) New Caledonia	1–1	1–1	2010 Coupe de l'Outre-Mer	
11	29 September 2010	Stade Louison Bobet, Le Plessis-Trévise, France	Martinique	1–0	2–0	2010 Coupe de l'Outre-Mer	
12	22 October 2010	Grenada National Stadium, St. George's, Grenada	Saint Kitts and Nevis	2–1	2–1	2010 Caribbean Cup qualification	
13	1 December 2010	Stade En Camée, Rivière-Pilote, Martinique	Antigua and Barbuda	1–0	1–0	2010 Caribbean Cup	
14	3 December 2010	Stade Pierre-Aliker, Fort-de-France, Martinique	Cuba	2–1	2–1	2010 Caribbean Cup	
15	22 September 2012	Stadium Montbauron, Versailles, France	Saint Pierre and Miquelon	6–0	13–0	2012 Coupe de l'Outre-Mer	

== Honours ==
Amical Club

- Coupe de Guadeloupe: 2006

Guadeloupe

- Caribbean Cup : Runner-up, 2010; third-place, 2008
