= 2018–19 Guadeloupe Division of Honor =

Guadeloupe Division of Honor
- Season: 2018–19

The 2018–19 Guadeloupe Division of Honor is the 68th season of the Guadeloupe Division of Honor, the top division football competition in Guadeloupe. The season began on 25 August 2018.

== League table ==
Note: 4 points for a win, 2 points for a draw, 1 point for a defeat.

| Pos | Team | Pld | W | D | L | GF | GA | GD | Pts | Qualification or relegation |
|---|---|---|---|---|---|---|---|---|---|---|
| 1 | Amical Club (C) | 26 | 16 | 7 | 3 | 42 | 20 | +22 | 81 | Caribbean Club Shield |
| 2 | Moulien | 26 | 16 | 5 | 5 | 35 | 16 | +19 | 79 | |
| 3 | Baie-Mahault | 26 | 13 | 9 | 4 | 50 | 22 | +28 | 74 | |
| 4 | Phare | 26 | 12 | 10 | 4 | 33 | 19 | +14 | 72 | |
| 5 | Arsenal | 26 | 12 | 7 | 7 | 23 | 18 | +5 | 69 | |
| 6 | La Gauloise | 26 | 10 | 7 | 9 | 31 | 23 | +8 | 63 | |
| 7 | USR | 26 | 9 | 9 | 8 | 31 | 28 | +3 | 62 | |
| 8 | Solidarité-Scolaire | 26 | 10 | 4 | 12 | 28 | 28 | 0 | 60 | |
| 9 | Stade Lamentinois | 26 | 8 | 8 | 10 | 31 | 35 | −4 | 58 | |
| 10 | Gosier | 26 | 8 | 7 | 11 | 31 | 41 | −10 | 57 | |
| 11 | UNAR | 26 | 6 | 6 | 14 | 24 | 34 | −10 | 50 | |
| 12 | Etoile (R) | 26 | 7 | 4 | 15 | 30 | 41 | −11 | 50 (Note: Etoile deducted 1 point.) | Relegated to Honorary Promotion Championship |
| 13 | Siroco (R) | 26 | 6 | 3 | 17 | 17 | 43 | −26 | 47 | Relegated to Honorary Promotion Championship |
| 14 | Red Star (R) | 26 | 5 | 2 | 19 | 17 | 55 | −38 | 43 | Relegated to Honorary Promotion Championship |

Source: Soccerway
(C) Champions; (R) Relegated
