= Grégory Gendrey =

Guadeloupean footballer (born 1986)

Personal information
- Date of birth: 10 July 1986 (age 40)
- Place of birth: Basse-Terre, Guadeloupe
- Height: 1.81 m (5 ft 11 in)
- Positions: Midfielder; winger

Team information
- Current team: La Gauloise

Senior career*
Years	Team	Apps	(Gls)
2007–2009	Evolucas		
2009–2010	Vannes	0	(0)
2010–2011	Compiègne	29	(6)
2011	→ ROCCM (loan)	13	(5)
2011–2012	Paris FC	22	(4)
2012	Etar 1924	4	(0)
2013	Compiègne	4	(1)
2014	Jura Sud	14	(3)
2014–2016	Fréjus Saint-Raphaël	56	(13)
2016–2017	Chambly	28	(10)
2017–2018	US Créteil	16	(2)
2018	Schiltigheim	7	(2)
2019	US Créteil	11	(5)
2019–2020	Laval	20	(3)
2020–2021	Épinal	6	(0)
2021–2023	Solidarité-Scolaire	34	(39)
2023–2025	Phare Petit-Canal	44	(35)
2025	La Gauloise	23	(19)

International career
2008–	Guadeloupe	32	(9)
- * Club domestic league appearances and goals

Grégory Gendrey (born 10 July 1986) is a Guadeloupean footballer who plays as a midfielder or winger for Phare Petit-Canal and the Guadeloupe team.

== Career ==
Gendrey began his career with Evolucas on the island of Guadeloupe. In 2009, Gendrey signed an amateur contract with professional club Vannes OC, however left the club in January 2010 to join Compiègne. After spending a year with Compiègne, in which he amassed over 30 appearances, Gendrey left the club to play for Charleroi-Marchienne in Belgium.

In January 2019, after six months with Schiltigheim, he returned to US Créteil where he signed a six-month contract. In July 2019 he moved to Stade Lavallois, signing a one-year deal with the option for an extension if the club won promotion.

At the end of his Laval contract, Gendrey signed for SAS Épinal in Championnat National 2.

=== International goals ===
Scores and results list Guadeloupe's goal tally first.

No.	Date	Venue	Opponent	Score	Result	Competition
1.	27 September 2008	Stade Municipal de Melun, Paris, France	New Caledonia	3–0	4–0	2008 Coupe de l'Outre-Mer
2.	11 October 2008	Stade René Serge Nabajoth, Les Abymes, Guadeloupe	Cayman Islands	6–0	7–1	2008 Caribbean Cup qualification
3.	8 December 2008	Jarrett Park, Montego Bay, Jamaica	Antigua and Barbuda	2–1	2–2	2008 Caribbean Cup
4.	22 October 2010	Grenada National Stadium, St. George's, Grenada	Saint Kitts and Nevis	1–0	2–1	2010 Caribbean Cup qualification
5.	24 October 2010	Grenada National Stadium, St. George's, Grenada	Puerto Rico	1–0	3–2	2010 Caribbean Cup qualification
6.	26 October 2010	Grenada National Stadium, St. George's, Grenada	Grenada	2–0	3–0	2010 Caribbean Cup qualification
7.	3 December 2010	Stade Pierre-Aliker, Fort-de-France, Martinique	Cuba	1–1	2–1	2010 Caribbean Cup
8.	11 September 2018	Raymond E. Guishard Technical Centre, The Valley, Anguilla	Saint Martin	2–0	3–0	2019–20 CONCACAF Nations League qualification
9.	2 June 2022	Stade René Serge Nabajoth, Les Abymes, Guadeloupe	Cuba	1–0	2–1	2022–23 CONCACAF Nations League B
