= Dominique Mocka =

French footballer (born 1978)

Personal information
- Date of birth: 13 August 1978 (age 48)
- Place of birth: Guadeloupe
- Positions: Midfielder; forward

Team information
- Current team: JS Vieux-Habitants

Senior career*
Years	Team	Apps	(Gls)
2002–2005	Racing Club		(38)
2005–2006	Jeunesse Sportive Saintoise		
2006–2012	JS Vieux-Habitants		
2012–2017	La Gauloise de Basse-Terre		
2017–	JS Vieux-Habitants		

International career
2002–2012	Guadeloupe	38	(17)

Managerial career
- 2010–: Guadeloupe U20
- * Club domestic league appearances and goals as of 13 November 2026

Dominique Mocka (born 13 August 1978) is a French footballer. Mocka can operate in midfield or as a forward and plays for JS Vieux-Habitants and the Guadeloupe football team. He is the brother of fellow Guadeloupe and JS Vieux-Habitants striker Erick Mocka.

== Club career ==
=== Racing Club ===
Mocka began his career in 1994 with Racing Club de Basse-Terre. He spent nine years and most of his career at the club, winning the Guadeloupe Division d'Honneur in the 2003–04 season, his penultimate year at Basse-Terre. With Basse-Terre, Mocka was the league's top scorer in two consecutive seasons, firstly in 2002–03, with 18 goals, as Racing Club finished eighth and then in 2003–04, with 20 goals, as his team won the league title.

=== Jeunesse Sportive Saintoise ===
Dominique spent a year at the club after leaving Racing Club de Basse-Terre in 2005. Jeunesse finished seventh in the 2005/06 Guadeloupe Division d'Honneur during Dominique's time at the club, and he scored eleven times, but lost out in the goalscoring charts to his brother, Erick Mocka, who scored fifteen times. In 2006, Mocka moved on to JS Vieux-Habitants.

=== JS Vieux-Habitants ===
Mocka currently plays for Guadeloupe top-flight club JS Vieux-Habitants and is the team's player/coach. He has been at Vieux-Habitants since 2006, but his most successful year at the club to date was 2010, when Vieux-Habitants won the league and Mocka scored 13 league goals.

== International career ==
Dominique has been capped thirty-eight times for his country, scoring seventeen goals. He wears the no. 5 shirt for Guadeloupe, a number that is usually worn by a central defender. Mocka played in the 2003 CONCACAF Gold Cup preliminary qualifiers against Puerto Rico on 7–21 July 2002. He then also featured in the group stage qualifying match against Jamaica on 11 November, against Barbados on 13 November, against Trinidad & Tobago on 28 March 2003 and against Antigua & Barbuda on 30 March. Dominique scored twice in ten minutes in the match against Antigua & Barbuda as Guadeloupe as his team won 2–0.

Mocka played for Guadeloupe at the 2007 Gold Cup. Mocka made his only appearance in the tournament in the 1–1 draw with Haiti in June 2007, coming on as a second-half substitute.

His next recent call-up for Les Gwada Boys came over three years later, on 7 December 2010, against Jamaica. Mocka played twice more that year, against Antigua and Barbuda and Cuba.

The midfielder was recalled to the Guadeloupe national team in October 2012, making three appearances at the 2012 Caribbean Cup. Mocka scored a first-half brace in the 4–1 win over Puerto Rico on 26 October 2012; these were his first international goals for nine years.

== Managerial career ==
In 2010, Mocka took charge of the Guadeloupe U20 team when they began competing for the first time since 1992. He was appointed joint-manager along with Steve Bizasene. Mocka said that he would put an emphasis on selecting locally based players for the team.

== Career statistics ==
=== International ===
Appearances and goals by national team and year
National team	Year	Apps	Goals
Guadeloupe	2002	5	0
Guadeloupe	2003	3	2
Guadeloupe	2004	3	2
Guadeloupe	2005	1	0
Guadeloupe	2006	5	5
Guadeloupe	2007	7	1
Guadeloupe	2010	6	1
Guadeloupe	2011	1	0
Guadeloupe	2012	7	6
Total		38	17

Scores and results list Guadeloupe's goal tally first, score column indicates score after each Mocka goal.

List of international goals scored by Dominique Mocka
No.	Date	Venue	Opponent	Score	Result	Competition	Ref.
1	30 March 2003	Manny Ramjohn Stadium, San Fernando, Trinidad and Tobago	Antigua and Barbuda	1–0	2–0	2003 CONCACAF Gold Cup qualification	
2	30 March 2003	Manny Ramjohn Stadium, San Fernando, Trinidad and Tobago	Antigua and Barbuda	2–0	2–0	2003 CONCACAF Gold Cup qualification	
3	12 November 2004	Stade Alfred Marie-Jeanne, Rivière-Pilote, Martinique	Dominica	1–0	7–0	2005 Caribbean Cup qualification	
4	12 November 2004	Stade Alfred Marie-Jeanne, Rivière-Pilote, Martinique	Dominica	5–0	7–0	2005 Caribbean Cup qualification	
5	22 September 2006	Stade René Serge Nabajoth, Les Abymes, Guadeloupe	Dominica	1–0	1–0	2007 Caribbean Cup qualification	
6	24 September 2006	Stade René Serge Nabajoth, Les Abymes, Guadeloupe	Martinique	4–0	4–0	2007 Caribbean Cup qualification	
7	24 November 2006	Bourda, Georgetown, Guyana	Dominican Republic	2–0	3–0	2007 Caribbean Cup qualification	
8	26 November 2006	Bourda, Georgetown, Guyana	Guyana	1–2	2–3	2007 Caribbean Cup qualification	
9	26 November 2006	Bourda, Georgetown, Guyana	Guyana	2–3	2–3	2007 Caribbean Cup qualification	
10	18 January 2007	Manny Ramjohn Stadium, San Fernando, Trinidad and Tobago	Saint Vincent and the Grenadines	1–0	1–0	2007 Caribbean Cup	
11	29 September 2009	Stade Louison Bobet, Paris, France	Martinique	2–0	2–0	2010 Coupe de l'Outre-Mer	
12	22 September 2012	Stade de Montbauron, Versailles, France	Saint Pierre and Miquelon	2–0	13–0	2012 Coupe de l'Outre-Mer	
13	24 September 2012	Stade Bauer, Paris, France	French Guiana	1–0	4–2	2012 Coupe de l'Outre-Mer	
14	24 September 2012	Stade Bauer, Paris, France	French Guiana	3–0	4–2	2012 Coupe de l'Outre-Mer	
15	26 September 2012	Stade Jean Rolland, Paris, France	Réunion	1–1	1–2	2012 Coupe de l'Outre-Mer	
16	25 October 2012	Stade René Serge Nabajoth, Les Abymes, Guadeloupe	Puerto Rico	2–0	4–1	2012 Caribbean Cup qualification	
17	25 October 2012	Stade René Serge Nabajoth, Les Abymes, Guadeloupe	Puerto Rico	3–0	4–1	2012 Caribbean Cup qualification	

== Honours ==
Racing Club

- Guadeloupe Division d'Honneur: 2002–03, 2003–04
- Coupe de Guadeloupe: 2003–04

JS Vieux-Habitants

- Guadeloupe Division d'Honneur: 2009–10

Individual

- Guadeloupe Division d'Honneur top scorer: 2002–03, 2003–04

== See also ==
- List of top international men's football goalscorers by country
