= Stade Municipal de Vieux-Habitants =

Football stadium in Guadeloupe

Coordinates: 16.0614°N 61.7631°W

Stade Municipal de Vieux-Habitants is a football stadium in Vieux-Habitants, Guadeloupe. It has a capacity of 1,000 and is currently used by the Guadeloupe Division d'Honneur's reigning champions, JS Vieux-Habitants. In the wake of recent hurricanes, the stadium was renovated in 2004, costing a total of €6.94 million.
