= Guadeloupe national football team =

National association football team

Guadeloupe
- Nickname(s): Les Gwada Boys (The Gwada Boys)
- Association: Ligue guadeloupéenne de football (LGF)
- Confederation: CONCACAF (North America)
- Sub-confederation: CFU (Caribbean)
- Head coach: Jocelyn Angloma
- Captain: Anthony Baron
- Most caps: Jean-Luc Lambourde (65)
- Top scorer: Dominique Mocka (17)
- Home stadium: Stade René Serge Nabajoth
- FIFA code: GLP
First colours	Second colours	Third colours

FIFA ranking
- Current: NR (7 October 2026)

First international
- (France) Martinique 6–0 Guadeloupe (France) (Martinique; 1934)

Biggest win
- Guadeloupe 13–0 Saint Pierre and Miquelon (Versailles, France; 22 September 2012)

Biggest defeat
- (France) Martinique 6–0 Guadeloupe (France) (Martinique; 1934); Martinique 8–2 Guadeloupe (Martinique; 1975); Curaçao 6–0 Guadeloupe (Willemstad, Curaçao; 19 November 2018)

CONCACAF Gold Cup
- Appearances: 6 (first in 2007)
- Best result: Semi-finals (2007)

CFU Championship / Caribbean Cup
- Appearances: 9 (first in 1981)
- Best result: Runners-up (2010)
Medal record
CFU Championship / Caribbean Cup
Silver medal – second place	2010 Martinique	Team
Bronze medal – third place	1981 Puerto Rico	Team
Bronze medal – third place	1985 Barbados	Team
Bronze medal – third place	1994 Trinidad and Tobago	Team
Bronze medal – third place	2008 Jamaica	Team

The Guadeloupe national football team (French: Sélection de la Guadeloupe de football) represents Guadeloupe (French overseas department) in men's international football, which is governed by the Ligue guadeloupéenne de football (English: Guadeloupean League of Football) founded in 1958, the local branch of the FFF. It has been an associate member of CONCACAF since 1964 and becoming a full member in 2013, but is not affiliated with FIFA. Regionally, it is an affiliate member of CFU in the Caribbean Zone.

Guadeloupe has qualified for the CONCACAF Gold Cup six times, reaching the semifinals in 2007, and has also participated once in League A, twice in League B and once in League C of the CONCACAF Nations League. Regionally, the team finished as runners-up in the 2010 Caribbean Cup. Guadeloupe cannot participate in World Cup qualifiers or FIFA global competitions, as it is not a FIFA member.

Guadeloupeans, being French citizens, are eligible to play for the France national football team. Guadeloupe is, however, a member of CONCACAF and CFU and is eligible for all competitions organized by both the organizations. Indeed, according to the status of the FFF (article 34, paragraph 6): "[...]Under the control of related continental confederations, and with the agreement of the FFF, those leagues can organize international sport events at a regional level or set up teams in order to participate to them."

== History ==
Guadeloupe was a surprise qualifier for the 2007 CONCACAF Gold Cup, the team earned qualification to the tournament after finishing in fourth place in the 2007 Caribbean Cup. The appearance in the Gold Cup marked Guadeloupe's first in the competition and they opened the campaign on 6 June 2007 with a 1–1 draw against Haiti. In the team's following match against Canada, Guadeloupe recorded a 2–1 victory in front of 20,000 spectators at the Orange Bowl in Miami. The team finally succumbed to defeat losing 1–0 to Costa Rica, to close out group play.

Guadeloupe advanced to the knockout stage of the competition as a result of being the second best performing third-place team in group play. In the quarter-finals, Guadeloupe were pitted against Honduras and earned an upset victory defeating the Hondurans 2–1 at the Reliant Stadium in Houston. Prior to its elimination, Honduras had been equal to the task of Guadeloupe having beaten Mexico 2–1 and dominating Cuba 5–0. In the ensuing round, Guadeloupe were defeated by Mexico 1–0. However, despite the loss, Guadeloupe were praised for its strong defensive performance. Guadeloupe's finish in the tournament was the best finish by a Caribbean island team since Trinidad and Tobago reached the semifinals of the 2000 tournament.

Guadeloupe's respectable third-place finish in the 2008 Caribbean Cup meant a consecutive appearance in the CONCACAF Gold Cup. Ahead of the competition, the team's coach Roger Salnot sought to increase Guadeloupe's chances of winning by calling up players of Guadeloupean descent who were born in metropolitan France. Salnot named notable players to his preliminary squad such as goalkeeper Yohann Thuram, defenders Daniel Congré, Michaël Ciani, Ronald Zubar, midfielders Étienne and Aurélien Capoue, and Ludovic Sylvestre, and attackers Alexandre Alphonse, Claudio Beauvue, and Richard Socrier. All players had been effective players in Ligue 1 and abroad. However, despite calling up an abundance of talent, only Alexandre Alphonse was allowed participation by his club. Every other player either personally turned down the invitation or was denied by his parent club with Salnot expressing his disappointment at the latter issue.

Guadeloupe was inserted to Group C of the 2009 CONCACAF Gold Cup alongside Mexico, Panama, and Nicaragua. The team started off the group with two straight victories defeating Panama 2–1 at the Oakland–Alameda County Coliseum and defeating the Nicaraguans 2–0 at the Reliant Stadium in Houston. In the team's final group stage match against Mexico, Guadeloupe was beaten 2–0 in Phoenix. Guadeloupe's second-place finish in the group meant another appearance in the knockout stage, where the team was pitted against Costa Rica in the quarter-finals at Cowboys Stadium in Arlington, Texas. In the match, it was Costa Rica who dominated scoring twice within the first 20 minutes of the match. Costa Rica finished the match with five goals with Guadeloupe getting a consolation goal from Alphonse in the second half.

In 2021, Guadeloupe once again qualified to compete for the Gold Cup.

On 27 June 2023, Guadeloupe was able to tie with Canada 2–2 in the remaining minutes of a 2023 Gold Cup Group Stage match.

== Team image ==
=== Kit sponsorship ===
Kit supplier	Period
(Guadeloupe) Rekhi	2008–2012
(Guadeloupe) Bobol	2014–2016
(France) Eldera	2016–2019
(United States) Nike	2019–2023
(Guadeloupe) Ballers Pride	2024
(Austria) Tempo	2024–present

== Results and fixtures ==
The following is a list of match results in the last 12 months, as well as any future matches that have been scheduled.

Win Draw Loss Fixture

=== 2026 ===
25 September 2026–27 CONCACAF Nations League B	Bermuda	1–2	Guadeloupe	Gros Islet, Saint Lucia
15:00	Russell 18' (pen.)	Report	Vulgaire 84'; Boisné 89'	Stadium: Daren Sammy Cricket Ground; Referee: Shemroy Alie (Antigua and Barbuda)

28 September 2026–27 CONCACAF Nations League B	Guadeloupe	2–2	Barbados	Gros Islet, Saint Lucia
15:00	Boisné 49', 90+1'	Report	Gale 76'; Reid-Stephen 78'	Stadium: Daren Sammy Cricket Ground; Attendance: 189; Referee: Cristhofer Corado (Guatemala)

2 October 2026–27 CONCACAF Nations League B	Saint Lucia	3–0	Guadeloupe	Wildey, Barbados
15:00	Elva 18' (pen.); Jude-Boyd 35'; Phillip 57'	Report		Stadium: Wildey Turf; Attendance: 36; Referee: Adrián Lage (Cuba)

5 October 2026–27 CONCACAF Nations League B	Guadeloupe	0–1	Saint Lucia	Wildey, Barbados
15:00		Report	Caull 5'	Stadium: Wildey Turf; Attendance: 17; Referee: Shekiel Jokil (Suriname)

12 November 2026–27 CONCACAF Nations League B	Barbados	0–3	Guadeloupe	Le Gosier, Guadeloupe
			Beauvue 10'; Plumain 41'; Gamby 80'	Stadium: Stade Roger Zami

16 November 2026–27 CONCACAF Nations League B	Guadeloupe	4–1	Bermuda	Le Gosier, Guadeloupe
14:00 (15:00 UTC−4)	Giblaca 7'; Beauvue 57'; Boisné 85' (pen.); Mirval 90+1'	Report	Parfitt-Williams 75'	Stadium: Stade Roger Zami; Referee: Pierre-Luc Lauzière (Canada)

== Coaching history ==
- (Guadeloupe) Roger Salnot (2001–2011)
- (Guadeloupe) Steve Bizasène (2012–2017)
- (Guadeloupe) Jocelyn Angloma (2017–present)

== Players ==
=== Current squad ===
The following players were called up for the 2026–27 CONCACAF Nations League B matches in September and October 2026.

Caps and goals as of 17 November 2026 after the match against Bermuda.

No.	Pos.	Player	Date of birth (age)	Caps	Goals	Club
	GK	Davy Rouyard	17 August 1999 (age 27)	17	0	(Ligue guadeloupéenne de football) Baie-Mahault
	GK	Mathieu Philémon	5 July 1999 (age 27)	2	0	(Ligue guadeloupéenne de football) Siroco Les Abymes
	GK	Alexis Silo	1 January 2001 (age 25)	0	0	(Ligue guadeloupéenne de football) AS Gosier
	DF	Mickaël Alphonse	12 July 1989 (age 37)	28	0	(Ligue guadeloupéenne de football) Arsenal Club
	DF	Nathanaël Saintini	30 May 2000 (age 26)	22	0	(Football Federation of Armenia) Noah
	DF	Andreaw Gravillon	8 February 1998 (age 28)	21	2	(Association of Football Federations of Azerbaijan) Neftchi Baku
	DF	Marcus Coco	24 June 1996 (age 30)	8	0	(Israel Football Association) Hapoel Tel Aviv
	DF	Fabien Geran	16 September 1998 (age 28)	6	0	(Ligue guadeloupéenne de football) Sporting Baie Mahault
	DF	Kenjy Montantin	20 February 2001 (age 25)	6	0	(Ligue guadeloupéenne de football) CSM
	DF	Brayan Tafna Danavin	11 July 2001 (age 25)	2	0	(Ligue guadeloupéenne de football) CS Moulien
	MF	Ange-Freddy Plumain	2 March 1995 (age 31)	31	10	(Cyprus Football Association) Omonia Aradippou
	MF	Willis Francillonne	15 January 1992 (age 34)	7	0	(Ligue de football de la Martinique) CS Moulien
	MF	Kendy Giblaca	5 November 1997 (age 29)	6	1	(Ligue guadeloupéenne de football) Sporting Baie Mahault
	MF	Mathis Citronnelle	3 October 1996 (age 30)	3	0	(Ligue de football de la Martinique) AS Samaritaine
	MF	Curtis Yebli	30 March 1997 (age 29)	2	0	(Hellenic Football Federation) Karmiotissa
	MF	Loïc Mayoute	2 December 2003 (age 22)	1	0	(French Football Federation) Beaucairois B
	FW	Raphaël Mirval	4 May 1996 (age 30)	27	12	(Ligue guadeloupéenne de football) Baie-Mahault
	FW	Dwen Capraja	23 September 2000 (age 26)	6	0	(Ligue guadeloupéenne de football) Arsenal Club
	FW	Claudio Beauvue	16 April 1988 (age 38)	5	3	(Ligue guadeloupéenne de football) AS Gosier
	FW	Djamalee Boisné	12 September 2005 (age 21)	5	4	(Ligue guadeloupéenne de football) Siroco Les Abymes
	FW	Allan Vulgaire	30 November 2004 (age 21)	5	1	(Ligue guadeloupéenne de football) L'Étoile
	FW	Jonathan Gamby	31 July 1991 (age 35)	4	1	(Ligue guadeloupéenne de football) Arsenal Club
	FW	Luidgi Mausse	31 October 2001 (age 25)	2	0	(Ligue guadeloupéenne de football) AS Dynamo

=== Recent call-ups ===
The following footballers were called up in the last 24 months and are still eligible to represent.

Pos.	Player	Date of birth (age)	Caps	Goals	Club	Latest call-up
GK	Brice Cognard	26 April 1990 (age 36)	10	0	(France) Châteauroux	v. Guatemala, 24 June 2025
GK	Rubens Adélaïde	15 December 1998 (age 27)	2	0	(France) Chambly	v. Guatemala, 24 June 2025
DF	Hans Dezac	4 August 2003 (age 23)	4	0	(Guadeloupe) L'Étoile	v. Saint Lucia, 5 October 2026
DF	Yonel Raddas	8 June 1996 (age 30)	4	0	(Guadeloupe) Sporting Baie Mahault	v. Saint Lucia, 5 October 2026
DF	Sulyvan Darase	8 May 1994 (age 32)	3	0	(Guadeloupe) L'Étoile	v. Saint Lucia, 5 October 2026
DF	Meddy Cysisque	13 October 2001 (age 25)	2	0	(Guadeloupe) Siroco Les Abymes	v. Saint Lucia, 5 October 2026
DF	Méddy Lina	11 January 1986 (age 40)	33	0	(Guadeloupe) Jeunesse Évolution	v. Guatemala, 24 June 2025
DF	Dimitri Cavaré	5 February 1995 (age 31)	14	0	(Turkey) Esenler Erokspor	v. Guatemala, 24 June 2025
DF	Jérôme Roussillon	6 January 1993 (age 33)	17	2	(England) Charlton Athletic	v. Guatemala, 24 June 2025
DF	Zoran Moco	27 June 2003 (age 23)	8	0	(France) Dijon	v. Guatemala, 24 June 2025
DF	Keyvan Beaumont	18 July 2005 (age 21)	3	0	(Guadeloupe) La Gauloise	v. Guatemala, 24 June 2025
DF	Yvann Maçon	1 October 1998 (age 28)	3	0	(Greece) AEL	v. Guatemala, 24 June 2025
DF	Christopher Jullien	22 March 1993 (age 33)	0	0	(France) Montpellier	v. Guatemala, 24 June 2025
MF	Thomas Davillars	20 July 1997 (age 29)	1	0	(Guadeloupe) AS Gosier	v. Saint Lucia, 5 October 2026
MF	Anthony Baron	29 December 1992 (age 33)	37	2	(Switzerland) Servette	v. Guatemala, 24 June 2025
MF	Jordan Leborgne	29 September 1995 (age 31)	19	3	(France) Quevilly-Rouen	v. Guatemala, 24 June 2025
MF	Steve Solvet	20 March 1996 (age 30)	15	2	(Azerbaijan) Sabah	v. Guatemala, 24 June 2025
MF	Junior Senneville	31 January 1991 (age 35)	13	0	(France) Calais	v. Guatemala, 24 June 2025
MF	Alexandre Arenate	20 July 1995 (age 31)	10	0	(Luxembourg) Jeunesse Esch	v. Guatemala, 24 June 2025
MF	Noah Cadiou	26 October 1998 (age 28)	5	0	(France) Lorient	v. Guatemala, 24 June 2025
MF	Johan Angloma	18 October 1993 (age 33)	3	0	(Guadeloupe) L'Étoile	v. Guatemala, 24 June 2025
FW	Taïryk Arconte	12 November 2003 (age 23)	9	3	(England) Millwall	v. Saint Lucia, 5 October 2026
FW	Willan Jacques	26 January 2006 (age 20)	1	0	(Guadeloupe) AS Gosier	v. Saint Lucia, 5 October 2026
FW	Matthias Phaëton	8 January 2000 (age 26)	34	12	(Singapore) Lion City Sailors	v. Guatemala, 24 June 2025
FW	Thierry Ambrose	28 March 1997 (age 29)	20	6	(Belgium) KV Kortrijk	v. Guatemala, 24 June 2025
FW	Vikash Tillé	26 November 1997 (age 28)	20	3	(Guadeloupe) CSM	v. Guatemala, 24 June 2025
FW	Kilian Bevis	13 February 1998 (age 28)	12	1	(Serbia) Radnički Kragujevac	v. Guatemala, 24 June 2025
FW	Florian David	16 November 1992 (age 34)	12	5	(Luxembourg) Atert Bissen	v. Guatemala, 24 June 2025
FW	Kenny Mixtur	9 October 2003 (age 23)	5	1	(Italy) Sudtirol	v. Guatemala, 24 June 2025

=== Previous squads ===
CONCACAF Gold Cup squads

- 2007 CONCACAF Gold Cup squad
- 2009 CONCACAF Gold Cup squad
- 2011 CONCACAF Gold Cup squad
- 2021 CONCACAF Gold Cup squad
- 2023 CONCACAF Gold Cup squad

Caribbean Championship

- 2010 Caribbean Championship squad

== Player records ==
As of 19 November 2024
Players in bold are still active with Guadeloupe.

=== Most appearances ===
Rank	Player	Caps	Goals	Period
1	Jean-Luc Lambourde	65	15	2002–2017
2	Alain Vertot	49	3	1999–2009
3	Lérry Hanany	45	7	2004–2017
4	Dominique Mocka	38	17	2002–2012
5	Ludovic Gotin	34	15	2006–2017
6	**Anthony Baron**	32	2	2018–present
6	Grégory Gendrey	32	9	2008–2023
8	**Méddy Lina**	31	0	2008–present
9	**Matthias Phaëton**	30	11	2021–present
10	Willy Laurence	28	0	2004–2017

=== Top goalscorers ===
Rank	Player	Goals	Caps	Ratio	Period
1	Dominique Mocka	17	38	0.45	2002–2012
2	Ludovic Gotin	15	34	0.44	2006–2017
2	Jean-Luc Lambourde	15	65	0.23	2002–2017
4	**Matthias Phaëton**	11	30	0.37	2021–present
5	**Raphaël Mirval**	10	21	0.48	2018–present
6	Grégory Gendrey	9	32	0.28	2008–2023
7	**Ange-Freddy Plumain**	8	20	0.4	2022–present
8	Vladimir Pascal	7	13	0.54	2010–2014
8	Lérry Hanany	7	45	0.16	2004–2017
10	Xavier Cassubie	6	11	0.55	2002–2004
10	Mickaël Antoine-Curier	6	16	0.38	2008–2012

== Competitive record ==
=== CONCACAF Gold Cup ===
Guadeloupe has participated in five of the seventeen CONCACAF Gold Cups contested. The team's first appearance in the competition was in 2007. The team reached the semi-finals where they were defeated by Mexico. Two years later, in 2009, Guadeloupe made their second consecutive appearance in the competition and, for the second straight time, reached the knockout stage of the Gold Cup. In the quarter-finals, Guadeloupe were defeated by Costa Rica.

CONCACAF Gold Cup record
Year	Result	Position	Pld	W	D*	L	GF	GA
(United States) 1991	Did not qualify							
(United States) (Mexico) 1993	Did not qualify							
(United States) 1996	Did not qualify							
(United States) 1998	Did not enter							
(United States) 2000	Did not qualify							
(United States) 2002	Did not qualify							
(United States) (Mexico) 2003	Did not qualify							
(United States) 2005	Did not qualify							
(United States) 2007	Semi-finals	4th	5	2	1	2	5	5
(United States) 2009	Quarter-finals	6th	4	2	0	2	5	8
(United States) 2011	Group stage	10th	3	0	0	3	2	5
(United States) 2013	Did not qualify							
(United States) (Canada) 2015	Did not qualify							
(United States) 2017	Did not qualify							
(United States) (Costa Rica) (Jamaica) 2019	Did not qualify							
(United States) 2021	Group stage	14th	3	0	0	3	3	7
(United States) (Canada) 2023	Group stage	9th	3	1	1	1	8	6
(United States) (Canada) 2025	Group stage	16th	3	0	0	3	5	10
Total	5/17	0 Titles	21	5	2	14	28	41

=== CONCACAF Nations League ===
CONCACAF Nations League record
League										Finals								
Season	Division	Group	Pld	W	D	L	GF	GA	P/R	Finals	Result	Pld	W	D	L	GF	GA	Squad
2019–20	C	D	4	4	0	0	20	2	▲	(United States) 2021	Ineligible							
2022–23	B	A	6	3	0	3	5	5	Same position	(United States) 2023	Ineligible							
2023–24	B	A	6	5	0	1	16	3	▲	(United States) 2024	Ineligible							
2024–25	A	A	4	1	1	2	1	4	▼	(United States) 2025	Did not qualify							
Total	—	—	20	13	1	6	42	14	—	Total	0 Titles	—	—	—	—	—	—	—

=== Caribbean Cup ===
Guadeloupe appeared in seven Caribbean Cups. The regional team never won the competition, but finished in third place on three occasions in 1989, 1994, and 2008. From the 2007 competition onwards, Guadeloupe finished inside the top four teams in the proceeding Caribbean Cups. In 2010, the team finished runners-up to Jamaica, losing 5–4 on penalties.

Year	Result	Position	Pld	W	D*	L	GF	GA
(Barbados) 1989	Third place	3rd	2	1	0	1	2	1
(Trinidad and Tobago) 1990	Did not qualify							
(Jamaica) 1991	Did not qualify							
(Trinidad and Tobago) 1992	Round 1	5th	3	1	0	2	1	3
(Jamaica) 1993	Did not qualify							
(Trinidad and Tobago) 1994	Third place	3rd	5	2	2	1	11	6
(Cayman Islands) (Jamaica) 1995	Did not qualify							
(Trinidad and Tobago) 1996	Did not enter							
(Antigua and Barbuda) (Saint Kitts and Nevis) 1997	Did not enter							
(Jamaica) (Trinidad and Tobago) 1998	Did not qualify							
(Trinidad and Tobago) 1999	Round 1	7th	3	0	0	3	4	10
(Trinidad and Tobago) 2001	Did not qualify							
(Barbados) 2005	Did not qualify							
(Trinidad and Tobago) 2007	Fourth place	4th	5	2	0	3	8	10
(Jamaica) 2008	Third place	3rd	5	1	2	2	6	8
(Martinique) 2010	Runners-up*	2nd	5	2	2	1	5	5
(Antigua and Barbuda) 2012	Did not qualify							
(Jamaica) 2014	Did not qualify							
(Martinique) 2017	Did not qualify							
Total	7/19	0 Titles	28	9	6	13	37	35

=== CFU Championship ===
From 1978 to 1985, Guadeloupe participated in the CFU Championship, a precursor to the Caribbean Cup. Of the six championships played, Guadeloupe featured in two final rounds and departed each tournament without a single win.

Year	Result	Position	Pld	W	D*	L	GF	GA
(Suriname) 1978	Did not qualify							
(Suriname) 1979	Did not qualify							
(Puerto Rico) 1981	Third place	3rd	3	0	1	2	2	6
(French Guiana) 1983	Did not qualify							
(Barbados) 1985	Third place	3rd	3	0	1	2	3	5
(Martinique) 1988	Did not qualify							
Total	2/6	0 Titles	6	0	2	4	5	11

*Draws include knockout matches decided via penalty shoot-out.
**Gold background colour indicates that the tournament was won. Red border colour indicates tournament was held on home soil.

== Honours ==
=== Regional ===
- CFU Championship / Caribbean Cup
  - (silver) Runners-up (1): 2010
  - (bronze) Third place (5): 1981, 1985, 1989, 1994, 2008
