= Ligue guadeloupéenne de football =

Governing body of football in Guadeloupe

CONCACAF
- Founded: 1958; 68 years ago
- Headquarters: Pointe-à-Pitre
- FIFA affiliation: N/A
- CONCACAF affiliation: 1978 (founding member of Caribbean Football Union); 2013 (full member)
- President: Guy Roch

The Guadeloupean League of Football (French: Ligue Guadeloupéenne de Football) is the governing body of football in Guadeloupe.

== See also ==
- Guadeloupe Division of Honour
- Guadeloupe national football team
