= Stade St. Claude =

Sports venue in Guadeloupe

Coordinates: 16°00′21″N 61°44′26″W

Stade St. Claude is a multi-use stadium in Basse-Terre, Guadeloupe. It is home to the Guadeloupe national football team. The stadium is currently used mostly for football matches by two teams, Racing Club de Basse-Terre and La Gauloise de Basse-Terre. It holds 4,000.
