= Guadeloupe Division of Honour =

- Founded: 1937
- Country: Guadeloupe
- Confederation: CONCACAF
- Number of clubs: 18
- Level on pyramid: 1
- Relegation to: Honorary Promotion Championship
- Domestic cup: Coupe de Guadeloupe
- International cup: CFU Club Shield
- Most championships: Moulien (20 titles)
- Top scorer: Gregory Gendrey (93 goals)
- Current: 2026–27 Guadeloupe Division of Honor

The Guadeloupe Division of Honour (French: Guadeloupe Division d'Honneur) is the top football league in Guadeloupe. It was created in 1952 and is headed by the Guadeloupean League of Football. 18 teams participate. The last 3 placed teams are relegated to the Honorary Promotion Championship.

== Clubs (2022–23) ==
=== Poule A ===
Locations of the 2022–23 Guadeloupe Division of Honor - Poule A teams
- CS Capesterrien (Capesterre-Belle-Eau)
- CERFA (Les Abymes)
- La Gauloise (Basse-Terre)
- AS Gosier (Le Gosier)
- Jeunesse Évolution (Les Abymes)
- CS Moulien (Le Moule)
- Red Star (Baie-Mahault)
- Sporting B/M (Baie-Mahault)
- JS Vieux-Habitants (Vieux-Habitants)

=== Poule B ===
Locations of the 2022–23 Guadeloupe Division of Honor - Poule B teams
- Dynamo Le Moule (Le Moule)
- L'Etoile (Morne-à-l'Eau)
- AO Gourbeyrienne (Gourbeyre)
- Juventus SA (Sainte-Anne)
- Le Phare (Petit-Canal)
- Siroco (Les Abymes)
- Solidarité SC (Baie-Mahault)
- Stade Lamentinois (Lamentin)
- U.S.B.M. (Baie-Mahault)

=== Relegated in 2021/22 ===
- Amical Club (Grand-Bourg de Marie Galante)
- Arsenal Club (Petit-Bourg)
- Club Amical Marquisat (Capesterre-Belle-Eau)
- Racing Club (Basse-Terre)

=== Relegated in 2016/17 ===
- U.S.C. de Bananier (Capesterre-Belle-Eau)
- AS Gosier (Le Gosier)
- Red Star (Baie Mahault)

=== Relegated in 2015/16 ===
- L'Etoile (Morne-à-l'Eau)
- Solidarité SC (Baie-Mahault)
- Club Amical Marquisat (Capesterre-Belle-Eau)

=== Relegated in 2014/15 ===
- AS Gosier (Le Gosier)
- Racing Club (Basse-Terre)

=== Relegated in 2013/14 ===
- AJSS Saintes (Terre-de-Haut)
- CS Capesterrien (Capesterre-Belle-Eau)
- JS Vieux-Habitants (Vieux-Habitants)

=== Relegated in 2012/13 ===
- Evolucas (Petit-Bourg)
- Phare du Canal (Petit-Canal)
- Stade Lamentinois (Lamentin)

=== Relegated in 2011/12 ===
- Amical Club (Grand-Bourg de Marie Galante)
- Etoile du Carmel (Basse-Terre)
- Racing Club (Basse-Terre)

=== Relegated in 2010/11 ===
- AS Dragon (Gosier)
- La Gauloise (Basse-Terre)
- Red Star (Baie Mahault)

== Previous winners ==
- 1937: unknown
- 1938-39: unknown
- 1940: AS Redoutable (Pointe-à-Pitre)
- 1941: Cygne Noir (Basse-Terre)
- 1942: AS Redoutable (Pointe-à-Pitre)
- 1943: Racing Club (Basse-Terre)
- 1944–45: Moulien (Le Moule)
- 1945–46: unknown
- 1946–47: Moulien (Le Moule)
- 1947–48: Moulien (Le Moule)
- 1948–49: Moulien (Le Moule)
- 1949–50: Racing Club (Basse-Terre)
- 1950–51: Moulien (Le Moule)
- 1951–52: Red Star (Pointe-à-Pitre)
- 1952–53: Moulien (Le Moule)
- 1953–54: Arsenal (Petit-Bourg)
- 1954–55: Moulien (Le Moule)
- 1955–56: Moulien (Le Moule)
- 1956–57: CS Capesterrien (Capesterre-Belle-Eau)
- 1957–58: unknown
- 1958–59: unknown
- 1959–60: La Gauloise (Basse-Terre)
- 1960–61: unknown
- 1961–62: CS Capesterrien (Capesterre-Belle-Eau)
- 1962–63: Cygne Noir (Basse-Terre)
- 1963–64: CS Capesterrien (Capesterre-Belle-Eau)
- 1964–65: Moulien (Le Moule)
- 1965–66: Red Star (Pointe-à-Pitre)
- 1966–67: Juventus SA (Sainte-Anne)
- 1967–68: Racing Club (Basse-Terre)
- 1968–69: Juventus SA (Sainte-Anne)
- 1969–70: Red Star (Pointe-à-Pitre)
- 1970–71: La Gauloise (Basse-Terre)
- 1971–72: Cygne Noir (Basse-Terre)
- 1972–73: Juventus SA (Sainte-Anne)
- 1973–74: Juventus SA (Sainte-Anne)
- 1974–75: Juventus SA (Sainte-Anne)
- 1975–76: Juventus SA (Sainte-Anne)
- 1976–77: La Gauloise (Basse-Terre)
- 1977–78: La Gauloise (Basse-Terre)
- 1978–79: Juventus SA (Sainte-Anne)
- 1979–80: L'Etoile (Morne-à-l'Eau)
- 1980–81: L'Etoile (Morne-à-l'Eau)
- 1981–82: L'Etoile (Morne-à-l'Eau)
- 1982–83: Cygne Noir (Basse-Terre)
- 1983–84: JS Capesterre (Capesterre-de-Marie-Galante)
- 1984–85: Moulien (Le Moule)
- 1985–86: US Ansoise (Anse-Bertrand)
- 1986–87: US Ansoise (Anse-Bertrand)
- 1987–88: Solidarité (Baie-Mahault)
- 1988–89: Zénith (Morne-à-l'Eau)
- 1989–90: Solidarité (Baie-Mahault)
- 1990–91: Solidarité (Baie-Mahault)
- 1991–92: Solidarité (Baie-Mahault)
- 1992–93: Solidarité (Baie-Mahault)
- 1993–94: Moulien (Le Moule)
- 1994–95: Arsenal (Petit-Bourg)
- 1995–96: L'Etoile (Morne-à-l'Eau)
- 1996–97: L'Etoile (Morne-à-l'Eau)
- 1997–98: L'Etoile (Morne-à-l'Eau)
- 1998–99: Racing Club (Basse-Terre)
- 1999–00: Juventus SA (Sainte-Anne)
- 2000–01: L'Etoile (Morne-à-l'Eau)
- 2001–02: L'Etoile (Morne-à-l'Eau)
- 2002–03: Phare du Canal (Petit-Canal)
- 2003–04: Racing Club (Basse-Terre)
- 2004–05: AS Gosier (Le Gosier)
- 2005–06: JS Vieux-Habitants (Vieux-Habitants)
- 2006–07: L'Etoile (Morne-à-l'Eau)
- 2007–08: Evolucas (Petit-Bourg)
- 2008–09: Moulien (Le Moule)
- 2009–10: JS Vieux-Habitants (Vieux-Habitants)
- 2010–11: Moulien (Le Moule)
- 2011–12: AJSS Saintes (Terre-de-Haut)
- 2012–13: Moulien (Le Moule)
- 2013–14: Moulien (Le Moule)
- 2014–15: Moulien (Le Moule)
- 2015–16: USR (Sainte-Rose)
- 2016–17: USR (Sainte-Rose)
- 2017–18: Moulien (Le Moule)
- 2018–19: Amical Club (Grand-Bourg)
- 2019–20 : Gosier (Le Gosier)
- 2020–21 : Gosier (Le Gosier)
- 2021–22 : Solidarité (Baie-Mahault)
- 2022–23 : Moulien (Le Moule)
- 2023–24 : Moulien (Le Moule)
- 2024–25 : Moulien (Le Moule)

== Appearances by club ==
Club	City	Titles	Last title
CS Moulien	Le Moule	20	2024–25
L'Etoile	Morne-à-l'Eau	9	2006–07
Juventus SA	Sainte-Anne	8	1986–87
Solidarité SC	Baie-Mahault	6	2021–22
Racing Club	Basse-Terre	5	2003–04
Cygne Noir	Basse-Terre	4	1982–83
La Gauloise	Basse-Terre	4	1977–78
Red Star	Pointe-à-Pitre	3	1969-70
CS Capesterrien	Capesterre-Belle-Eau	3	1963–64
AS Gosier	Le Gosier	3	2020–21
USR	Sainte-Rose	2	2016-17
JS Vieux-Habitants	JS Vieux-Habitants	2	2009-10
Arsenal	Petit-Bourg	2	1994–95
US Ansoise	Anse-Bertrand	2	1986-87
AS Redoutable	Pointe-à-Pitre	2	1942
Amical Club	Grand-Bourg de Marie-Galante	1	2018-19
AJSS Saintes	Terre-de-Haut	1	2011-12
Evolucas	Petit-Bourg	1	2007-08
Phare du Canal	Petit-Canal	1	2002–03
Zénith	Morne-à-l'Eau	1	1988–89
JS Capesterre	Capesterre-de-Marie-Galante	1	1983–84

== Top goalscorers ==
Year	Best scorers	Team	Goals
2002–03	(Guadeloupe) Dominique Mocka	Racing Club	18
2003–04	(Guadeloupe) Dominique Mocka	Racing Club	20
2005–06	(Guadeloupe) Erick Mocka	Vieux-Habitants	15
2009–10	(Guadeloupe) Marc Arbau	Saintes	21
2021-22	(Guadeloupe) Raphaël Mirval	Solidarité-Scolaire	18
2022-23	(Guadeloupe) Grégory Gendrey	Solidarité-Scolaire	22
2023-24	(Guadeloupe) Grégory Gendrey	Le Phare	20
2024-25	(Guadeloupe) Vikash Tillé	Moulien	16
2025-26	(Guadeloupe) Claudio Beauvue	Le Gosier	24

Most goals by a player in a single season

- 24 goals.
  - Claudio Beauvue (2025-26).

=== Multiple hat-tricks ===
Rank	Country	Player	Hat-tricks
1	(Guadeloupe)	Claudio Beauvue	1
1	(Guadeloupe)	Likendy Labylle	1
