= Evolucas (Lamentin) =

- Full name: Evolucas
- Ground: Stade Jean Naffer, Petit-Bourg, Guadeloupe
- Chairman: Vincent Gaétan Vilnard
- Manager: Alex Parnasse; Mario Kancel
- League: Guadeloupe Championnat National
- 2007/08: Champions
Home colours

Evolucas is a football club in Guadeloupe, based in the town of Petit-Bourg. They play in Guadeloupe's first division, the Guadeloupe Championnat National.

The club was founded in 1958, but it was not until the beginning of the 21st century that it achieved significant accomplishments, such as winning the Guadeloupe qualifying round of the Coupe de France in 2004.

The club claimed their first domestic league title in the 2007/2008 season.

It last competed in the Guadeloupe Division of Honour in the 2012–13 season, after being relegated that year.

== Achievements ==
- Guadeloupe Championnat National: 1

2008
