= USC de Bananier =

Guadeloupean football club

U.S.C. de Bananier
- Full name: Union Sportive et Culturelle de Bananier
- Nickname(s): USCB
- Ground: Stade Municipal, Capesterre-Belle-Eau, Guadeloupe
- Capacity: 2,000
- Chairman: Césaire Jean-Baptiste
- Manager: Aurélien Meinau
- League: Guadeloupe Division of Honor
- 2016–17: 4th

Union Sportive et Culturelle de Bananier, (English: Sports and Cultural Union of Bananier or other wise known as U.S.C. de Bananier is a Guadeloupean football club based in Capesterre-Belle-Eau. The club plays in the Guadeloupe Division of Honor, the top tier of football in Guadeloupe.
