= ASG Juventus de Sainte-Anne =

ASG Juventus
- Full name: Association Sportive et Culturelle Juventus de Sainte-Anne
- Ground: Stade Rivière des Pères, Sainte-Anne, Guadeloupe
- Chairman: Thierry Saint Clement
- League: Guadeloupe Championnat National

ASG Juventus de Sainte-Anne is a professional football club in Guadeloupe, based in the city of Sainte-Anne.

They play in Guadeloupe's first division, the Guadeloupe Division d'Honneur.

== Achievements ==
- Guadeloupe Championnat National: 8

1966–67, 1968–69, 1972–73, 1973–74, 1974–75, 1975–76, 1978–79, 1999–00

- Coupe de Guadeloupe: 6

1955, 1958, 1970/71, 1975, 1976, 1978
