= AN Jeunesse Évolution =

Jeunesse Évolution
- Full name: Association Nouvelle; Jeunesse Évolution
- Ground: Stade René Serge Nabajoth, Les Abymes, Guadeloupe
- Capacity: 7,500
- Chairman: Gaëtan Saint-Yves
- Manager: Yvon Centime; Bruno Capet
- League: Guadeloupe Division of Honor

Association Nouvelle Jeunesse Évolution, commonly known as AN Jeunesse Évolution, or simply as Jeunesse Évolution, is a professional football club based in Les Abymes, Guadeloupe, playing in the Guadeloupe Division of Honor.

== Achievements ==
- None
