= JS Vieux-Habitants =

- Full name: Jeunesse Sportive Vieux-Habitants
- Ground: Stade Municipal de Vieux-Habitants, Vieux-Habitants, Guadeloupe
- Chairman: Brice Jean-Paul
- Manager: Corentin Ésperance
- League: Guadeloupe Division of Honor

JS Vieux-Habitants is a Guadeloupean professional football club based in the town of Vieux-Habitants. They play in Guadeloupe's first division, the Guadeloupe Division of Honor.

== Achievements ==
- Guadeloupe Championnat National: 2

2006, 2010
