= Amical Club Marie Galante =

Amical Club
- Full name: Amical Club de Marie Galante
- Ground: Stade Jose Bade, Capesterre-de-Marie-Galante, Guadeloupe
- Capacity: 1,500
- Chairman: Bogota François Gérard
- Manager: Pierre Hamousin; Edouard Elisa
- League: Guadeloupe Championnat National
- 2021–22: 19th

Amical Club is a football club based in the city of Capesterre-de-Marie-Galante, Marie Galante, Guadeloupe.

== History ==
Founded in 1966 in the city of Marie-Galante, it is one of the most important teams in Guadeloupe, having won the championship for the first time in its history in the 2018-19 season.

At the international level they would participate in the CONCACAF Caribbean Club Shield in 2020. However, it would be cancelled due to the coronavirus pandemic.

== Achievements ==
- Guadeloupe Championnat National: 1

2019

- Coupe de Guadeloupe: 2

2006, 2021

== Participation in CONCACAF Competitions ==
Season	Tournament	Round	Club	Result
2020	CONCACAF Caribbean Club Shield	Group stage	(Antigua and Barbuda) Liberta SC	Cancelled
2020	CONCACAF Caribbean Club Shield	Group stage	(British Virgin Islands) One Love United FC	Cancelled
2020	CONCACAF Caribbean Club Shield	Group stage	SV Racing Club Aruba	Cancelled
