= Solidarité-Scolaire =

Solidarité Scolaire
- Full name: Solidarité Scolaire
- Ground: Stade Fiesque Duchesne, Baie-Mahault, Guadeloupe
- Chairman: Christian Valentin Ajax
- Manager: Elie Ardens
- League: Guadeloupe Division of Honour

Solidarité Scolaire is a professional football club in Guadeloupe, based in the town of Baie-Mahault. They originally come from Pointe-à-Pitre.

They play in Guadeloupe's first division, the Guadeloupe Division of Honour.

== Achievements ==
- Guadeloupe Championnat National: 6

1987–88, 1989–90, 1990–91, 1991–92, 1992–93, 2021–22

- Coupe de Guadeloupe: 5

1963, 1973, 1986, 1992, 1993

== Performance in CONCACAF competitions ==
- CONCACAF Champions Cup: 4 appearances

1989 – First round (Caribbean Zone) – Lost against (Martinique) Réveil- Sportif 2–4 on aggregate
1991 – First round (Caribbean Zone) – Lost against (Martinique) US Marinoise 1–3 on aggregate
1992 – Second round (Caribbean Zone) – Lost against (Martinique) Aiglon du Lamentin 1–2 on aggregate
1994 – First Round (Caribbean) – Lost against (Netherlands Antilles) Sithoc 3–4 on aggregate
