= Phare Petit-Canal =

- Full name: Phare Petit-Canal
- Ground: Stade de Petit Canal
- Capacity: 1,500
- Owner: Gaston Lavergne
- Head coach: Hippolyte Inité
- League: Guadeloupe Division of Honor

Phare Petit-Canal is a Guadeloupean professional football club that is based in the commune of Petit-Canal. The club competes in the Guadeloupe Division of Honor, the top tier of football on the island.
