= La Gauloise de Basse-Terre =

La Gauloise
- Full name: La Gauloise de Basse-Terre
- Ground: Stade Rivière des Pères, Basse-Terre, Guadeloupe
- Chairman: Gérard Cabald
- Manager: Godwin Calais
- League: Guadeloupe Championnat National

La Gauloise de Basse-Terre is a professional football club in Guadeloupe, based in the country's capital city Basse-Terre.

They play in Guadeloupe first division, the Guadeloupe Championnat National.

== Achievements ==
- Guadeloupe Championnat National: 2

1971, 1978

- Coupe de Guadeloupe: 2

1946, 2007

== Performance in CONCACAF competitions ==
- CONCACAF Champions Cup: 2 appearances

1988– 1st round (Caribbean Zone) – Won against (Netherlands Antilles) RKSV Centro Dominguito, further results not known
1990 – Preliminary round (Caribbean Zone) – Lost against (Guadeloupe) Zénith Morne-à-l'Eau
