= List of association football teams to have won four or more trophies in one season =

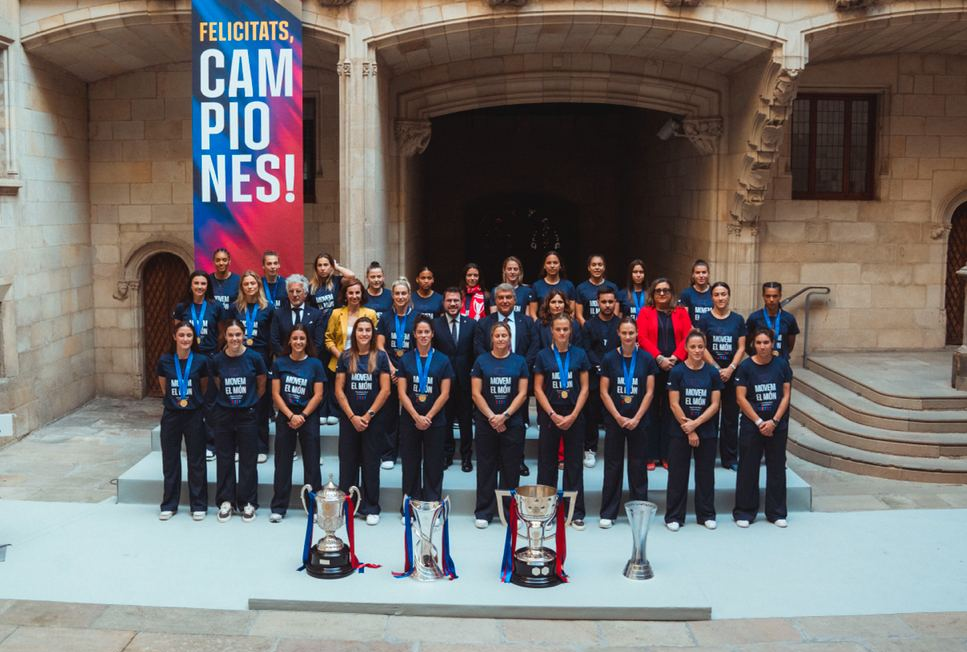
FC Barcelona Femení with the four trophies they won in the 2023–24 season

This is an incomplete list of football clubs that have won four or more trophies in a single season.

In a football season, clubs typically compete in many domestic competitions, such as a league and one or more cup competitions, as well as sometimes in continental competitions. Winning multiple competitions is seen as a particularly significant achievement. Doubles and trebles are usually long-remembered achievements, but do occur with some level of frequency, whereas winning four or more trophies in one season is much rarer. In the 2010s, the terms quadruple, quintuple, and sextuple have sometimes been used to refer to winning four, five, and six trophies in a single season.

This list is limited to clubs playing in the top division of their league system.

== Four titles in one season ==
Some clubs have won four competitions in a single season. This has sometimes been called a 'quadruple'. Other teams have won four competitions in a calendar year, though not all in the same season.

=== Men ===
Club	Country	Confederation	Number won	Season	Titles won	Refs.
Linfield	Northern Ireland	UEFA	10	1894–95	Irish Premier League, Irish Cup, City Cup, Belfast Charity Cup	
Linfield	Northern Ireland	UEFA	10	1903–04	Irish Premier League, Irish Cup, County Antrim Shield, City Cup	
Linfield	Northern Ireland	UEFA	10	1929–30, 1933–34	Irish Premier League, Irish Cup, County Antrim Shield, Belfast Charity Cup	
Linfield	Northern Ireland	UEFA	10	1949–50	Irish Premier League, Irish Cup, Gold Cup, City Cup	
Linfield	Northern Ireland	UEFA	10	1967–68	Gold Cup, City Cup, Ulster Cup, Top Four Cup	
Linfield	Northern Ireland	UEFA	10	1970–71	Irish Premier League, Gold Cup, Ulster Cup, Blaxnit Cup	
Linfield	Northern Ireland	UEFA	10	1979–80	Irish Premier League, Irish Cup, Gold Cup, Ulster Cup	
Linfield	Northern Ireland	UEFA	10	1981–82	Irish Premier League, Irish Cup, County Antrim Shield, Gold Cup	
Linfield	Northern Ireland	UEFA	10	2005–06	County Antrim Shield, Irish League Cup, Irish Premier League, Irish Cup	
Mohun Bagan	India	AFC	7	1976–77	IFA Shield, Rovers Cup, Calcutta Football League, Bordoloi Trophy	
Mohun Bagan	India	AFC	7	1977–78	Durand Cup, IFA Shield, Rovers Cup, Bordoloi Trophy	
Mohun Bagan	India	AFC	7	1984–85	Durand Cup, Calcutta Football League, Sikkim Gold Cup, Bordoloi Trophy	
Mohun Bagan	India	AFC	7	1986–87, 1994–95	Federation Cup, Durand Cup, Calcutta Football League, Sikkim Gold Cup	
Mohun Bagan	India	AFC	7	1992–93	Federation Cup, Rovers Cup, Calcutta Football League, Sikkim Gold Cup	
Mohun Bagan	India	AFC	7	2000–01	Durand Cup, Rovers Cup, Sikkim Gold Cup, All Airlines Gold Cup	
Kaizer Chiefs	South Africa	CAF	6	1977, 1981	National Professional Soccer League, Nedbank Cup, MTN 8, Sales House Cup	
Kaizer Chiefs	South Africa	CAF	6	1984	National Professional Soccer League, Nedbank Cup, Carling Knockout Cup, Sales House Cup	
Kaizer Chiefs	South Africa	CAF	6	1987	Nedbank Cup, MTN 8, Telkom Charity Cup, Ohlsson's Challenge Cup	
Kaizer Chiefs	South Africa	CAF	6	2001–02	Carling Knockout Cup, MTN 8, African Cup Winners' Cup, Vodacom Challenge	
Kaizer Chiefs	South Africa	CAF	6	2003–04	South African Premiership, Carling Knockout Cup, Vodacom Challenge, Telkom Charity Cup	
Paris Saint-Germain	France	UEFA	5	2014–15, 2015–16, 2017–18, 2019–20	Trophée des Champions, Ligue 1, Coupe de France, Coupe de la Ligue	
Paris Saint-Germain	France	UEFA	5	2024–25	Trophée des Champions, Ligue 1, Coupe de France, UEFA Champions League	
Belfast Celtic	Northern Ireland	UEFA	4	1936–37	Irish League, Irish Cup, County Antrim Shield, Belfast Charity Cup	
Belfast Celtic	Northern Ireland	UEFA	4	1938–39	Irish League, Gold Cup, County Antrim Shield, Belfast Charity Cup	
Belfast Celtic	Northern Ireland	UEFA	4	1939–40	Irish League, City Cup, Gold Cup, Belfast Charity Cup	
Belfast Celtic	Northern Ireland	UEFA	4	1947–48	Irish League, City Cup, Gold Cup, Dublin and Belfast Inter-City Cup	
Nacional	Uruguay	CONMEBOL	4	1916	Primera División, Copa de Honor, Copa Aldao, Copa de Honor Cousenier	
Nacional	Uruguay	CONMEBOL	4	1919	Primera División, Copa de Competencia, Copa Albion de Caridad, Copa Aldao	
Nacional	Uruguay	CONMEBOL	4	1961	Torneo de Honor, Torneo Competencia, Torneo Cuadrangular, Campeonato Nacional General Artigas	
Nacional	Uruguay	CONMEBOL	4	1971	Uruguayan Primera División, Copa Libertadores, Copa Interamericana, Intercontinental Cup	
Floriana	Malta	UEFA	4	1952–53	Maltese Premier League, Maltese FA Trophy, Cassar Cup, Schembri Shield	
Floriana	Malta	UEFA	4	1953–54	Maltese FA Trophy, Cassar Cup, Schembri Shield, Malta Playing Field Association Shield	
Floriana	Malta	UEFA	4	1975–76	Maltese FA Trophy, Independence Cup, Sons of Malta Cup, Testaferrata Cup	
Floriana	Malta	UEFA	4	1976–77	Maltese Premier League, Independence Cup, Sons of Malta Cup, Testaferrata Cup	
Glentoran	Northern Ireland	UEFA	4	1950–51	Irish Premier League, Irish Cup, City Cup, Ulster Cup	
Glentoran	Northern Ireland	UEFA	4	1966–67	Irish Premier League, Gold Cup, City Cup, Ulster Cup	
Glentoran	Northern Ireland	UEFA	4	1987–88	Irish Premier League, Irish Cup, Floodlit Cup, County Antrim Centenary Chalice	
Glentoran	Northern Ireland	UEFA	4	1989–90	Irish Cup, County Antrim Shield, Ulster Cup, Floodlit Cup	
Lincoln Red Imps	Gibraltar	UEFA	4	2003–04, 2007–08, 2010–11, 2013–14	Gibraltar Premier Division, Rock Cup, Pepe Reyes Cup, Gibraltar Premier Cup	
Club Franciscain	Martinique	CONCACAF	4	1998–99, 2002–03	Martinique Championnat National, Coupe de la Martinique, Trophée du Conseil Général, Coupe de la France (Régionale)	
Club Franciscain	Martinique	CONCACAF	4	2007–08	Coupe de la Martinique, Trophée du Conseil Général, Coupe D.O.M, Ligue des Antilles	
Club Franciscain	Martinique	CONCACAF	4	2017-18	Martinique Championnat National, Coupe de la Martinique, Trophée du Conseil Général, CFU Club Shield	
Istiklol	Tajikistan	AFC	4	2014, 2015, 2018, 2019	Tajikistan Higher League, Tajikistan Cup, Tajik Supercup, TFF Cup	
Johor Darul Ta'zim	Malaysia	AFC	4	2022, 2023, 2024–25, 2025–26	Piala Sumbangsih, Malaysia Super League, Malaysia FA Cup, Malaysia Cup	
Rangers	Scotland	UEFA	3	1929–30, 1933–34	Scottish Division One, Scottish Cup, Glasgow Cup, Glasgow Merchants Charity Cup	
Rangers	Scotland	UEFA	3	1975–76	Scottish Premier Division, Scottish Cup, Scottish League Cup, Glasgow Cup	
Mufulira Wanderers	Zambia	CAF	3	1965	Zambian Premier League, Zambian Cup, Chibuku Cup, Inter-Rhodesia Castle Cup	
Mufulira Wanderers	Zambia	CAF	3	1968	Zambian Cup, Zambian Challenge Cup, Chibuku Cup, Zambian Charity Shield	
Mufulira Wanderers	Zambia	CAF	3	1976	Zambian Premier League, Chibuku Cup, Champion of Champions Cup, Zambian Charity Shield	
Peñarol	Uruguay	CONMEBOL	3	1909	Copa de Honor, Copa de Competencia, Torneo Artigas - Copa Casa de Catalina, Copa de Honor Cousenier	
Peñarol	Uruguay	CONMEBOL	3	1911	Primera División, Copa de Honor, Torneo Artigas - Copa Casa de Catalina, Copa de Honor Cousenier	
Peñarol	Uruguay	CONMEBOL	3	1982	Uruguayan Primera División, Copa Libertadores, Intercontinental Cup, Torneo Copa de Oro	
Shamrock Rovers	Republic of Ireland	UEFA	3	1932–33	FAI Cup, League of Ireland Shield, LFA President's Cup, Leinster Senior Cup	
Shamrock Rovers	Republic of Ireland	UEFA	3	1955–56	FAI Cup, League of Ireland Shield, Top Four Cup, Leinster Senior Cup	
Shamrock Rovers	Republic of Ireland	UEFA	3	1984–85	League of Ireland, FAI Cup, LFA President's Cup, Leinster Senior Cup	
Sporting Praia Cruz	São Tomé and Príncipe	CAF	3	1982, 1994	São Tomé and Príncipe Championship, Taça Nacional de São Tomé e Príncipe, São Tomé Island League, Taça Regional de São Tomé	
Sporting Praia Cruz	São Tomé and Príncipe	CAF	3	1999	São Tomé and Príncipe Championship, São Tomé Island League, Taça Regional de São Tomé, Taça Solidariedade	
Vitória Riboque	São Tomé and Príncipe	CAF	3	1986, 1994	São Tomé and Príncipe Championship, Taça Nacional de São Tomé e Príncipe, São Tomé Island League, Taça Regional de São Tomé	
Vitória Riboque	São Tomé and Príncipe	CAF	3	2011	Taça Nacional de São Tomé e Príncipe, São Tomé and Príncipe Super Cup, São Tomé Island League, Taça Regional de São Tomé	
Dandy Town Hornets	Bermuda	CONCACAF	3	1993–94	Bermudian Premier Division, Friendship Trophy, Dudley Eve Cup, Charity Shield	
Dandy Town Hornets	Bermuda	CONCACAF	3	2011–12, 2013–14	Bermudian Premier Division, Bermuda FA Cup, Dudley Eve Cup, Charity Shield	
Barcelona	Spain	UEFA	3	2009–10	Supercopa de España, UEFA Super Cup, FIFA Club World Cup, La Liga	
Barcelona	Spain	UEFA	3	2011–12	Supercopa de España, UEFA Super Cup, FIFA Club World Cup, Copa del Rey	
Barcelona	Spain	UEFA	3	2015–16	UEFA Super Cup, FIFA Club World Cup, La Liga, Copa del Rey	
PHC Zebras	Bermuda	CONCACAF	3	1989–90, 2017–18	Bermudian Premier Division, Friendship Trophy, Dudley Eve Cup, Charity Shield	
PHC Zebras	Bermuda	CONCACAF	3	2007–08	Bermudian Premier Division, Bermuda FA Cup, Martonmere Cup, Charity Shield	
Bayern Munich	Germany	UEFA	3	2012–13	DFL-Supercup, Bundesliga, DFB-Pokal, UEFA Champions League	
Bayern Munich	Germany	UEFA	3	2013–14	UEFA Super Cup, FIFA Club World Cup, Bundesliga, DFB-Pokal	
Bayern Munich	Germany	UEFA	3	2020–21	UEFA Super Cup, DFL-Supercup, FIFA Club World Cup, Bundesliga	
Auckland City	New Zealand	OFC	3	2013–14	Charity Cup, NZFC Minor Premiership, NZFC Grand Final, OFC Champions League	
Auckland City	New Zealand	OFC	3	2014–15	OFC President's Cup, NZFC Minor Premiership, NZFC Grand Final, OFC Champions League	
Auckland City	New Zealand	OFC	3	2022	OFC Champions League, Northern League, New Zealand National League, Chatham Cup	
Buriram United	Thailand	AFC	3	2013, 2015	Kor Royal Cup, Thai Premier League, Thai FA Cup, Thai League Cup	
Buriram United	Thailand	AFC	3	2024‍–‍25	Thai League 1, Thai FA Cup, Thai League Cup, ASEAN Club Championship	
Racing Club	Argentina	CONMEBOL	2	1913	Argentine Primera División, Copa Ibarguren, Copa de Honor Municipalidad de Buenos Aires, Copa de Honor Cousenier	
Racing Club	Argentina	CONMEBOL	2	1917	Argentine Primera División, Copa Ibarguren, Copa de Honor Municipalidad de Buenos Aires, Copa Aldao	
Santos	Brazil	CONMEBOL	2	1962	Campeonato Paulista, Taça Brasil, Copa Libertadores, Intercontinental Cup	
Santos	Brazil	CONMEBOL	2	1963	Torneio Rio-São Paulo, Taça Brasil, Copa Libertadores, Intercontinental Cup	
Sliema Wanderers	Malta	UEFA	2	1923–24	Maltese Premier League, Cassar Cup, Cousis Shield, Empire Sports Ground Cup	
Sliema Wanderers	Malta	UEFA	2	1964–65	Maltese Premier League, Maltese FA Trophy, Independence Cup, Testaferrata Cup	
Coleraine	Northern Ireland	UEFA	2	1968–69	City Cup, Ulster Cup, Top Four Cup, Blaxnit Cup	
Coleraine	Northern Ireland	UEFA	2	1969–70	Gold Cup, Ulster Cup, North West Senior Cup, Blaxnit Cup	
Celtic	Scotland	UEFA	2	1907–08	Scottish Division One, Scottish Cup, Glasgow Cup, Glasgow Merchants Charity Cup	
Celtic	Scotland	UEFA	2	1974–75	Scottish Cup, Scottish League Cup, Drybrough Cup, Glasgow Cup	
Bohemians	Republic of Ireland	UEFA	2	1927–28	League of Ireland, FAI Cup, League of Ireland Shield, Leinster Senior Cup	
Bohemians	Republic of Ireland	UEFA	2	1974–75	League of Ireland, League of Ireland Cup, LFA President's Cup, Leinster Senior Cup	
River Plate	Argentina	CONMEBOL	2	1941	Argentine Primera División, Copa Ibarguren, Copa Adrián C. Escobar, Copa Aldao	
River Plate	Argentina	CONMEBOL	2	1986	Argentine Primera División, Copa Libertadores, Copa Interamericana, Intercontinental Cup	
South China	Hong Kong	AFC	2	1987–88, 1990–91	Hong Kong First Division League, Hong Kong Senior Challenge Shield, Hong Kong FA Cup, Viceroy Cup	
Nauti	Tuvalu	OFC	2	1988, 1990	Tuvalu A-Division, Tuvalu Knockout Cup, Independence Cup, Rothmans Knockout Cup	
East Bengal	India	AFC	2	1990–91	IFA Shield, Durand Cup, Rovers Cup, All Airlines Gold Cup	
East Bengal	India	AFC	2	1995–96	Calcutta Football League, IFA Shield, Durand Cup, All Airlines Gold Cup	
Simba	Tanzania	CAF	2	1995	Tanzanian Premier League, Nyerere Cup, Tanzania FA Cup, CECAFA Club Championship	
Simba	Tanzania	CAF	2	2002	Tanzanian Premier League, Tusker Cup, Tanzania Community Shield, CECAFA Club Championship	
Al-Muharraq	Bahrain	AFC	2	2008	Bahraini Premier League, Bahraini King's Cup, Bahraini Crown Prince Cup, AFC Cup	
Al-Muharraq	Bahrain	AFC	2	2009	Bahraini Premier League, Bahraini King's Cup, Bahraini Crown Prince Cup, Bahraini FA Cup	
Al-Qadsia	Kuwait	AFC	2	2002–03	Kuwait Premier League, Kuwait Emir Cup, Kuwait Crown Prince Cup, Al-Khurafi Cup	
Al-Qadsia	Kuwait	AFC	2	2009–10	Kuwait Premier League, Kuwait Emir Cup, Kuwait Crown Prince Cup, Kuwait Super Cup	
Porto	Portugal	UEFA	2	1987–88	UEFA Super Cup, Intercontinental Cup, Primeira Divisão, Taça de Portugal	
Porto	Portugal	UEFA	2	2010–11	Supertaça Cândido de Oliveira, Primeira Liga, Taça de Portugal, UEFA Europa League	
Al-Wehdat	Jordan	AFC	2	2008–09, 2010–11	Jordan Super Cup, Jordan League, Jordan FA Cup, Jordan FA Shield	
Orlando Pirates	South Africa	CAF	2	1973	South African Premiership, Nedbank Cup, MTN 8, Sales House Cup	
Orlando Pirates	South Africa	CAF	2	2011–12	South African Premiership, Carling Knockout Cup, MTN 8, Carling Black Label Cup	
TP Mazembe	DR Congo	CAF	2	2011	Linafoot, CAF Super Cup, LIFKAT, EUFLU	
TP Mazembe	DR Congo	CAF	2	2016	Linafoot, DR Congo Super Cup, CAF Confederation Cup, CAF Super Cup	
Albirex Niigata (S)	Singapore	AFC	2	2016, 2017	Singapore Community Shield, Singapore Premier League, Singapore Cup, Singapore League Cup	
Real Madrid	Spain	UEFA	2	2016–17	UEFA Super Cup, FIFA Club World Cup, La Liga, UEFA Champions League	
Real Madrid	Spain	UEFA	2	2017–18	Supercopa de España, UEFA Super Cup, FIFA Club World Cup, UEFA Champions League	
Al Ahed	Lebanon	AFC	2	2010–11	Lebanese Super Cup, Lebanese Premier League, Lebanese Elite Cup, Lebanese FA Cup	
Al Ahed	Lebanon	AFC	2	2018–19	Lebanese Super Cup, Lebanese Premier League, Lebanese FA Cup, AFC Cup	
Dundalk	Republic of Ireland	UEFA	2	2015	League of Ireland, FAI Cup, President of Ireland's Cup, Leinster Senior Cup	
Dundalk	Republic of Ireland	UEFA	2	2019	League of Ireland, President of Ireland's Cup, League of Ireland Cup, Champions Cup	
Kuwait SC	Kuwait	AFC	2	2016–17, 2024–25	Kuwait Super Cup, Kuwait Premier League, Kuwait Emir Cup, Kuwait Crown Prince Cup	
Alumni	Argentina	CONMEBOL	1	1906	Argentine Primera División, Copa de Honor Municipalidad de Buenos Aires, Tie Cup, Copa de Honor Cousenier	
Boca Juniors	Argentina	CONMEBOL	1	1919	Argentine Primera División, Copa de Competencia Jockey Club, Copa Ibarguren, Tie Cup	
Queen's Island	Northern Ireland	UEFA	1	1923–24	Irish League, Irish Cup, County Antrim Shield, City Cup	
Independiente	Argentina	CONMEBOL	1	1939	Argentine Primera División, Copa Ibarguren, Copa Adrián C. Escobar, Copa Aldao	
Wydad AC	Morocco	CAF	1	1949	Botola Pro, ULNA Champions League, North African Cup, ULNA Super Cup	
Assaut	Martinique	CONCACAF	1	1966	Martinique Championnat National, Coupe de la Martinique, Coupe de la France (Régionale), Coupe D.O.M.	
Ards	Northern Ireland	UEFA	1	1973-74	Irish Cup, Gold Cup, Ulster Cup, Blaxnit Cup	
Club Olimpia	Paraguay	CONMEBOL	1	1979	Paraguayan Primera División, Copa Libertadores, Copa Interamericana, Intercontinental Cup	
CD de Guadalupe	São Tomé and Príncipe	CAF	1	1981	São Tomé and Príncipe Championship, Taça Nacional de São Tomé e Príncipe, São Tomé Island League, Taça Regional de São Tomé	
Africa Sports	Ivory Coast	CAF	1	1986	Côte d'Ivoire Premier Division, Coupe de Côte d'Ivoire, Coupe Houphouët-Boigny, WAFU Club Championship	
CSKA Sofia	Bulgaria	UEFA	1	1988–89	Bulgarian A Professional Football Group, Bulgarian Cup, Cup of the Soviet Army, Bulgarian Supercup	
Nkana	Zambia	CAF	1	1989	Zambian Premier League, Zambian Cup, Zambian Charity Shield, Chibuku Cup	
ASEC Mimosas	Ivory Coast	CAF	1	1990	Côte d'Ivoire Premier Division, Coupe de Côte d'Ivoire, Coupe Houphouët-Boigny, WAFU Club Championship	
Portadown	Northern Ireland	UEFA	1	1990–91	Irish Premier League, Irish Cup, Ulster Cup, Floodlit Cup	
Santana	São Tomé and Príncipe	CAF	1	1991	São Tomé and Príncipe Championship, Taça Nacional de São Tomé e Príncipe, São Tomé Island League, Taça Regional de São Tomé	
Ħamrun Spartans	Malta	UEFA	1	1991–92	Maltese FA Trophy, Maltese Super Cup, Super 5 Lottery Tournament, Euro Challenge Cup	
São Paulo	Brazil	CONMEBOL	1	1993	Copa Libertadores, Intercontinental Cup, Recopa Sudamericana, Supercopa Libertadores	
Ajax	Netherlands	UEFA	1	1995–96	Johan Cruijff Shield, Intercontinental Cup, UEFA Super Cup, Eredivisie	
Vasco da Gama Club	Bermuda	CONCACAF	1	1995–96	Bermudian Premier Division, Martonmere Cup, Dudley Eve Cup, Charity Shield	
CAPS United	Zimbabwe	CAF	1	1996	Zimbabwe Premier Soccer League, BP League Cup, Zimbabwean Charity Shield, Independence Cup	
Al-Quwa Al-Jawiya	Iraq	AFC	1	1996–97	Baghdad Championship, Iraq FA Cup, Iraqi Premier League, Iraqi Super Cup	
Mighty Wanderers	Malawi	CAF	1	1996–97	Super League of Malawi, Chibuku Cup, Kamuzu Cup, 555 Challenge Cup	
Al-Ittihad	Saudi Arabia	AFC	1	1998–99	Saudi Pro League, Saudi Federation Cup, Asian Cup Winners' Cup, GCC Club Championship	
Al-Arabi SC	Kuwait	AFC	1	1998–99	Kuwait Emir Cup, Kuwait Crown Prince Cup, Kuwait Federation Cup, Al-Khurafi Cup	
Nyasa Big Bullets	Malawi	CAF	1	1998–99	Super League of Malawi, Chombe Tea Cup, Press Cup, BAT Life Kings Cup	
Al-Zawra'a	Iraq	AFC	1	1999–2000	Iraqi Super Cup, Baghdad Championship, Iraq FA Cup, Iraqi Premier League	
Cavalier FC	Bahamas	CONCACAF	1	2000-01	Bahamas National Championship, New Providence Football League, New Providence FA Cup, Bahamas President's Cup	
Highlanders	Zimbabwe	CAF	1	2001	Zimbabwe Premier Soccer League, Zimbabwean Charity Shield, Independence Cup, ZIFA Unity Cup	
North Village Rams	Bermuda	CONCACAF	1	2003–04	Bermuda FA Cup, Friendship Trophy, Martonmere Cup, Charity Shield	
Rhyl	Wales	UEFA	1	2003–04	Cymru Premier, Welsh Cup, Welsh League Cup, NWCFA Challenge Cup	
Ba	Fiji	OFC	1	2004	Fiji Premier League, Fiji FA Cup, Inter-District Championship, Champions of Champions	
FC Derby	Cape Verde	CAF	1	2004–05	Cape Verdean Football Championship, São Vicente Premier Division, São Vicente Cup, São Vicente Super Cup	
Sun Hei	Hong Kong	AFC	1	2004–05	Hong Kong First Division League, Hong Kong Senior Challenge Shield, Hong Kong FA Cup, Hong Kong League Cup	
Asante Kotoko	Ghana	CAF	1	2005	Ghana Premier League, SWAG Cup, Ghana Telecom Gala, GHALCA President's Cup	
Al-Sadd	Qatar	AFC	1	2006–07	Qatar Stars League, Sheikh Jassim Cup, Qatar Cup, Emir of Qatar Cup	
ZESCO United	Zambia	CAF	1	2007	Zambian Premier League, Zambian Coca-Cola Cup, ABSA Cup, Zambian Charity Shield	
Sporting Clube da Praia	Cape Verde	CAF	1	2007–08	Cape Verdean Football Championship, Santiago South Premier Division, Santiago South Cup, Santiago South Super Cup	
Manchester United	England	UEFA	1	2008–09	FA Community Shield, FIFA Club World Cup, Football League Cup, Premier League	
Joe Public	Trinidad and Tobago	CONCACAF	1	2009	TT Pro League, FA Trophy, Pro Bowl, TOYOTA Classic	
Bears FC	Bahamas	CONCACAF	1	2009-10	BFA Senior League, New Providence FA Cup, Bahamas President's Cup Bahamas Charity Shield	
Debrecen	Hungary	UEFA	1	2009–10	Szuperkupa, Nemzeti Bajnokság I, Magyar Kupa, Ligakupa	
St Michel United	Seychelles	CAF	1	2011	Seychelles League, Seychelles FA Cup, Seychelles League Cup, Seychelles Presidents Cup	
Morvant Caledonia United	Trinidad and Tobago	CONCACAF	1	2011–12	FA Trophy, First Citizens Cup, Lucozade Sport Goal Shield, Caribbean Club Championship	
Sporting Clube do Príncipe	São Tomé and Príncipe	CAF	1	2012	São Tomé and Príncipe Championship, Taça Nacional de São Tomé e Príncipe, Príncipe Island League, Taça Regional de Príncipe	
Mbabane Swallows	Swaziland	CAF	1	2012–13	Swazi Premier League, Swazi FA Cup, Castle Premier Challenge, PLS Cup	
Devonshire Cougars	Bermuda	CONCACAF	1	2012–13	Bermudian Premier Division, Bermuda FA Cup, Friendship Trophy, Charity Shield	
New Radiant	Maldives	AFC	1	2013	Dhivehi Premier League, Maldives FA Cup, Maldives President's Cup, Maldivian FA Charity Shield	
Moulien	Guadeloupe	CONCACAF	1	2013–14	Guadeloupe Division of Honour, Coupe de Guadeloupe, Coupe de France (Zone Guadeloupe), Ligue des Antilles	
Central FC	Trinidad and Tobago	CONCACAF	1	2014–15	TT Pro League, First Citizens Cup, Pro Bowl Caribbean Club Championship	
CS Mindelense	Cape Verde	CAF	1	2014-15	Cape Verdean Football Championship, São Vicente Premier Division, São Vicente Cup, São Vicente Super Cup	
Cork City	Republic of Ireland	UEFA	1	2017	League of Ireland, FAI Cup, President of Ireland's Cup, Munster Senior Cup	
UDRA	São Tomé and Príncipe	CAF	1	2017	São Tomé and Príncipe Championship, Taça Nacional de São Tomé e Príncipe, São Tomé Island League, Taça Regional de São Tomé	
Kitchee	Hong Kong	AFC	1	2017–18	Hong Kong Premier League, Sapling Cup, Hong Kong FA Cup, Hong Kong Community Cup	
Hilal Al-Quds	Palestine	AFC	1	2017–18	West Bank Premier League, West Bank Cup, Palestine Cup, West Bank Super Cup	
Saint-Pierroise	Réunion	CAF	1	2018	Trophée des Champions, Réunion Premier League, Coupe de la Réunion, Coupe Régionale de France	
Manchester City	England	UEFA	1	2018–19	FA Community Shield, EFL Cup, Premier League, FA Cup	
Real Rincon	Bonaire	CONCACAF	1	2018–19	Liga FFB, Kopa FFB, Kopa ABC, Bonaire Super Cup	
Flamengo	Brazil	CONMEBOL	1	2020	Supercopa do Brasil, Recopa Sudamericana, Campeonato Carioca, Campeonato Brasileiro Série A	
Al Ahly	Egypt	CAF	1	2022–23	Egyptian Super Cup, Egyptian Premier League, Egypt Cup, CAF Champions League	
Red Arrows	Zambia	CAF	1	2024	Zambian Premier League, ABSA Cup, Zambian Charity Shield, Kagame Interclub Cup	
GD Palmeira	Cape Verde	CAF	1	2024-25	Cape Verdean Football Championship, Taça Nacional de Cabo Verde, Supertaça de Cabo Verde, Sal Premier Division	
Shabab Al-Ahli	United Arab Emirates	AFC	1	2024-25	UAE Pro League, UAE President's Cup, UAE Super Cup, Qatar–UAE Challenge Shield	

=== Women ===
Club	Country	Confederation	Number won	Season	Titles won	Refs.
Barcelona	Spain	UEFA	4	2019–20	Primera División, Copa de la Reina, Copa Catalunya, Supercopa de España	
Barcelona	Spain	UEFA	4	2023–24, 2025–26	Liga F, Copa de la Reina, Supercopa de España, UEFA Women's Champions League	
Barcelona	Spain	UEFA	4	2024–25	Liga F, Copa de la Reina, Copa Catalunya, Supercopa de España	
Lady Cougars	Bermuda	CONCACAF	2	2000–01, 2005–06	Bermudian Women's League, Bermuda Women's FA Cup, Charity Cup, Konica Cup	
Arsenal	England	UEFA	1	2000–01	FA Women's Premier League, FA Women's Cup, FA Women's League Cup, FA Women's Community Shield	
Fulham	England	UEFA	1	2002–03	FA Women's Premier League National Division, FA Women's Cup, FA Women's League Cup, London Women's Cup	
Olympia Coast	Seychelles	CAF	1	2006	Seychelles Women's League, Land Marine Cup, Airtel Magic Cup, Patrons Cup	
Valur	Iceland	UEFA	1	2010	Besta deild kvenna, Icelandic Women's Football Cup, Icelandic Women's Super Cup, Icelandic Women's League Cup	
Tokyo Verdy Beleza	Japan	AFC	1	2019	Nadeshiko League, Empress's Cup, Nadeshiko League Cup, AFC Women's Club Championship	
Jiangsu Suning	China	AFC	1	2019	Chinese Women's Super League, Chinese Women's National Championship, Chinese Women's FA Cup, Chinese Women's FA Super Cup	
OL Lyonnes	France	UEFA	1	2019–20	Première Ligue, Coupe de France Féminine, Trophée des Championnes, UEFA Women's Champions League	
Chelsea	England	UEFA	1	2020–21	FA Women's Super League, Women's FA Cup, FA Women's League Cup, Women's FA Community Shield	
Determine Girls	Liberia	CAF	1	2022–23	LFA Women’s First Division, Orange Cup, LFA Super Cup, WAFU Women's Champions League	
Corinthians	Brazil	CONMEBOL	1	2023	Campeonato Brasileiro Feminino Série A1, Supercopa do Brasil Feminino, Campeonato Paulista Feminino, Copa Libertadores Femenina	
Benfica	Portugal	UEFA	1	2023–24	Campeonato Nacional Feminino, Taça de Portugal Feminina, Taça da Liga Feminina, Supertaça de Portugal Feminina	
Auckland United	New Zealand	OFC	1	2024	NRFL Women's Premiership, New Zealand Women's National League, Kate Sheppard Cup, OFC Women's Champions League	
AS FAR	Morocco	CAF	1	2024–25	Moroccan Women's Championship, Moroccan Women Throne Cup, CAF Women's Champions League UNAF Qualifiers, CAF Women's Champions League,	

== Five titles in one season ==
Other teams have won five competitions in a calendar year, though not all in the same season.

=== Men ===
Club	Country	Confederation	Number won	Season	Titles won	Refs.
Shamrock Rovers	Republic of Ireland	UEFA	4	1954–55	LFA President's Cup, FAI Cup, League of Ireland Shield, Dublin City Cup, Leinster Senior Cup	
Shamrock Rovers	Republic of Ireland	UEFA	4	1956–57	League of Ireland, LFA President's Cup, League of Ireland Shield, Dublin City Cup, Leinster Senior Cup	
Shamrock Rovers	Republic of Ireland	UEFA	4	1957–58	LFA President's Cup, League of Ireland Shield, Dublin City Cup, Leinster Senior Cup, Top Four Cup	
Shamrock Rovers	Republic of Ireland	UEFA	4	1963–64	League of Ireland, FAI Cup, League of Ireland Shield, Dublin City Cup, Leinster Senior Cup	
East Bengal	India	AFC	3	1972–73	Calcutta Football League, IFA Shield, Durand Cup, Rovers Cup, Bordoloi Trophy	
East Bengal	India	AFC	3	1973–74	Calcutta Football League, IFA Shield, Rovers Cup, DCM Trophy, Bordoloi Trophy	
East Bengal	India	AFC	3	2002–03	National Football League, Calcutta Football League, IFA Shield, Durand Cup, Independence Day Cup	
Linfield	Northern Ireland	UEFA	2	1935–36	Irish Cup, Gold Cup, City Cup, Belfast Charity Cup, Jubilee Cup	
Linfield	Northern Ireland	UEFA	2	1993–94	Irish Premier League, Irish Cup, Irish League Cup, NIFL Charity Shield, Floodlit Cup	
Club Franciscain	Martinique	CONCACAF	2	2001–02	Martinique Championnat National, Coupe de la Martinique, Trophée du Conseil Général, Coupe de la France (Régionale), Coupe D.O.M	
Club Franciscain	Martinique	CONCACAF	2	2004–05	Martinique Championnat National, Coupe de la Martinique, Trophée du Conseil Général, Coupe de la France (Régionale), Ligue des Antilles	
Nacional	Uruguay	CONMEBOL	1	1915	Primera División, Copa de Competencia, Copa de Honor, Tie Cup, Copa de Honor Cousenier	
Belfast Celtic	Northern Ireland	UEFA	1	1925–26	Irish League, Irish Cup, City Cup, Gold Cup, Belfast Charity Cup	
Sliema Wanderers	Malta	UEFA	1	1955–56	Maltese Premier League, Maltese FA Trophy, Cassar Cup, Scicluna Cup, Schembri Shield	
Celtic	Scotland	UEFA	1	1966–67	European Cup, Scottish First Division, Scottish Cup, Scottish League Cup, Glasgow Cup	
Kabwe Warriors	Zambia	CAF	1	1972	Zambian Premier League, Zambian Cup, Zambian Challenge Cup, Chibuku Cup, Zambian Charity Shield	
Dynamos	Zimbabwe	CAF	1	1976	Zimbabwe Premier Soccer League, Castle Cup, BAT Rose Bowl, Nyore Nyore Shield, Southern African Club Championship	
Kaizer Chiefs	South Africa	CAF	1	1989	National Soccer League, Carling Knockout Cup, MTN 8, Telkom Charity Cup, Ohlsson's Challenge Cup	
DC Motema Pembe	DR Congo	CAF	1	1994	Coupe du Congo, African Cup Winners' Cup, DR Congo Super Cup, Coupe de l'Indépendance, EPFKIN	
Valletta	Malta	UEFA	1	1996–97	Maltese Premier League, Maltese Cup, MFA Super Cup, Löwenbräu Cup, Super 5 Lottery Tournament	
AS Vénus	Tahiti	OFC	1	1999	Tahiti Ligue 1, Tahiti Cup, Tahiti Coupe des Champions, Coupe T.O.M., Outremer Champions Cup	
Mohun Bagan	India	AFC	1	2001–02	National Football League, Federation Cup, Calcutta Football League, Sikkim Gold Cup, Bordoloi Trophy	
Saint-Louisienne	Réunion	CAF	1	2002	Réunion Premier League, Coupe de la Réunion, Coupe Régionale de France, Coupe D.O.M., Outremer Champions Cup	
Zamalek	Egypt	CAF	1	2002–03	Egyptian Premier League, Egyptian Super Cup, CAF Champions League, Arab Club Champions Cup, Saudi-Egyptian Super Cup	
Ba	Fiji	OFC	1	2006	Fiji Premier League, Fiji FA Cup, Inter-District Championship, Battle of the Giants, Champions of Champions	
Al Ahly	Egypt	CAF	1	2006–07	CAF Super Cup, Egyptian Premier League, Egypt Cup, CAF Champions League, Egyptian Super Cup	
W Connection	Trinidad and Tobago	CONCACAF	1	2013–14	Charity Shield, TT Pro League, FA Trophy, TOYOTA Classic, Pro Bowl	
UDRA	São Tomé and Príncipe	CAF	1	2014	São Tomé and Príncipe Championship, Taça Nacional de São Tomé e Príncipe, São Tomé and Príncipe Super Cup, São Tomé Island League, Taça Regional de São Tomé	
Sporting Praia Cruz	São Tomé and Príncipe	CAF	1	2015	São Tomé and Príncipe Championship, Taça Nacional de São Tomé e Príncipe, São Tomé and Príncipe Super Cup, São Tomé Island League, Taça Regional de São Tomé	
Nyasa Big Bullets	Malawi	CAF	1	2023	Super League of Malawi, FAM Cup, Castle Challenge Cup, Airtel Top 8, FAM Charity Shield	
Arkadag	Turkmenistan	AFC	1	2025	Ýokary Liga, Turkmenistan Cup, Turkmenistan Super Cup, Turkmenistan Football Federation Cup, AFC Challenge League	
Paris Saint-Germain	France	UEFA	1	2025–26	UEFA Super Cup, Trophée des Champions, Ligue 1, FIFA Intercontinental Cup, UEFA Champions League	

=== Women ===
Club	Country	Confederation	Number won	Season	Titles won	Refs.
Arsenal	England	UEFA	1	2008–09	FA Women's Premier League, FA Women's Cup, FA Women's League Cup, FA Women's Community Shield, London Women's Cup	

== Six titles in a season ==
Other teams have won six competitions in a calendar year, though not all in the same season.

=== Men ===
Club	Country	Confederation	Number won	Season	Titles won	Refs.
Nkana	Zambia	CAF	1	1993	Zambian Premier League, Zambian Cup, Zambian Challenge Cup, Zambian Charity Shield, Chibuku Cup, Champion of Champions Cup	
Valletta	Malta	UEFA	1	2000–01	Maltese Premier League, Maltese Cup, MFA Super Cup, Löwenbräu Cup, Super 5 Lottery Tournament, Malta Centenary Cup	
Club Franciscain	Martinique	CONCACAF	1	2006–07	Martinique Championnat National, Coupe de la Martinique, Trophée du Conseil Général, Coupe D.O.M., Outremer Champions Cup, Ligue des Antilles	
Flamengo	Brazil	CONMEBOL	1	2025	Supercopa do Brasil, Campeonato Carioca, Campeonato Brasileiro Série A, Copa Libertadores, FIFA Derby of the Americas, FIFA Challenger Cup	

=== Women ===
Club	Country	Confederation	Number won	Season	Titles won	Refs.
Arsenal	England	UEFA	1	2006–07	UEFA Women's Cup, FA Women's Premier League, FA Women's Cup, FA Women's League Cup, FA Women's Community Shield, London Women's Cup	

== Seven titles in a season ==
Other teams have won seven competitions in a calendar year, though not all in the same season.

=== Men ===
Club	Country	Confederation	Number won	Season	Titles won	Refs.
Linfield	Northern Ireland	UEFA	2	1921–22	County Antrim Shield, Irish Premier League, Irish Cup, City Cup, Gold Cup, Belfast Charity Cup, Alhambra Cup	
Linfield	Northern Ireland	UEFA	2	1961–62	County Antrim Shield, Irish Premier League, Irish Cup, City Cup, Gold Cup, Ulster Cup, North-South Cup	
Highlanders	Zimbabwe	CAF	1	1986	Chibuku Cup, Rothams Shield, Africa Day Cup, Heroes Day Cup, Castle Cup, Independence Cup, Natbrew Cup	
Club Franciscain	Martinique	CONCACAF	1	2003–04	Martinique Championnat National, Coupe de la Martinique, Trophée du Conseil Général, Coupe de la France (Régionale), Coupe D.O.M., Outremer Champions Cup, Ligue des Antilles	

== See also ==
- List of football clubs by competitive honours won
- Sextuple (association football)
- Double (association football)
- Treble (association football)
