= 2015–16 Guadeloupe Division of Honor =

Guadeloupe Division d'Honneur
- Season: 2015–16
- Champions: USR (1st title)
- Relegated: Solidarité SC; Club Amical
- CFU Club Championship: USR; CS Moulien
- Matches: 182
- Goals: 383 (2.1 per match)
- Biggest home win: Amical Club 6-1 Club Amical; Siroco 5-0 Gourbeyrienne
- Biggest away win: Club Amical 0-5 US Baie-Mahault
- Highest scoring: Amical Club 6-1 Club Amical

The 2015–16 season of the Guadeloupe Division d'Honneur is the 65th season of top-tier football in Guadeloupe. It started on 4 September 2015 and finished on 24 May 2016. CS Moulien were the defending champions, having won their 11th top tier title last season. USR won their first title this season.

== Changes from 2014–15 ==
At the end of last season, AS Gosier and Racing Club finished in 13th and 14th place in the league and were relegated to the Promotion d'Honneur Régionale. Taking their places were the winners and runners up from the Promotion d'Honneur Régionale, Amical Club and Gourbeyrienne.

== Teams ==
Team	Based	Stadium
Amical Club	Les Abymes	Stade René Serge Nabajoth
Arsenal	Petit-Bourg	
Gourbeyrienne		
Club Amical	Capesterre-Belle-Eau	
CS Moulien	Le Moule	Stade Jacques Pontrémy
Juventus SA	Sainte-Anne	Stade St. Claude
L'Etoile	Morne-à-l'Eau	Stade Pierre Monnerville
La Gauloise	Basse-Terre	Stade St. Claude
Phare du Canal	Petit-Canal	
Red Star	Baie-Mahault	
Siroco	Les Abymes	
Solidarité SC	Baie-Mahault	Stade Fiesque Duchesne
US Baie-Mahault	Baie-Mahault	Stade Fiesque Duchesne
USR	Sainte-Rose	

== Table ==
Pos	Team	Pld	W	D	L	GF	GA	GD	Pts	Qualification or relegation
1	USR (C)	26	19	4	3	50	20	+30	87	2017 Caribbean Club Championship, 2016–17 Coupe de France
2	CS Moulien	26	14	8	4	38	18	+20	76	2017 Caribbean Club Championship, 2016–17 Coupe de France
3	La Gauloise	26	14	6	6	43	29	+14	74	
4	US Baie-Mahault	26	12	7	7	32	21	+11	69	
5	Juventus SA	26	11	6	9	28	25	+3	65	
6	Siroco	26	10	7	9	32	29	+3	63	
7	Phare du Canal	26	8	12	6	23	20	+3	62	
8	Gourbeyrienne	26	7	8	11	16	27	−11	55	
9	Amical Club	26	7	7	12	22	27	−5	54	
10	Arsenal	26	7	7	12	22	29	−7	54	
11	Red Star	26	8	3	15	21	29	−8	53	
12	L'Etoile (R)	26	5	11	10	17	26	−9	52	Relegation to Promotion d'Honneur Régionale
13	Solidarité SC (Note: Solidarité SC were deducted 1 point.) (R)	26	5	8	13	17	31	−14	48	Relegation to Promotion d'Honneur Régionale
14	Club Amical (R)	26	5	6	15	22	52	−30	47	Relegation to Promotion d'Honneur Régionale

Updated to match(es) played on 24 May 2016.
Source: https://www.rsssf.org/tablesf/frant2016.html
(C) Champions;
(R) Relegated

== Results ==
Home \ Away	AMC	ARS	AGO	CAM	CSM	JSA	LET	LGA	PHC	RST	SIR	SOL	UBM	USR
Amical Club		1–0	0–2	6–1	0–1	1–1	0–1	1–3	1–0	0–2	2–1	0–1	1–2	0–0
Arsenal	0–0		1–0	2–2	1–2	1–3	2–0	1–1	3–0	1–0	0–1	2–1	0–1	2–3
Gourbeyrienne	0–0	1–0		0–0	0–1	1–1	1–1	1–2	1–1	2–1	1–0	0–2	0–1	0–2
Club Amical	1–2	2–1	2–0		0–4	1–2	0–3	0–1	0–3	2–0	2–0	2–2	0–5	0–4
CS Moulien	2–2	0–0	0–0	2–2		2–0	0–0	1–1	2–0	2–0	1–2	2–1	3–0	0–2
Juventus SA	1–0	3–1	0–1	2–1	1–0		0–0	0–1	1–1	2–1	1–0	2–1	0–0	0–1
L'Etoile	0–1	1–1	0–1	0–1	0–0	1–0		2–3	1–1	0–1	1–1	2–0	0–3	1–0
La Gauloise	2–0	0–1	3–2	4–1	2–4	2–0	2–0		1–2	0–2	2–2	1–1	0–1	1–3
Phare du Canal	1–1	1–0	1–0	2–0	0–1	1–1	2–2	0–1		2–0	1–1	0–0	0–1	1–1
Red Star	1–0	1–0	0–1	2–1	0–0	1–0	1–1	1–2	1–1		0–1	3–0	1–2	1–2
Siroco	1–1	4–0	5–0	1–1	0–4	2–1	0–0	0–2	0–1	2–1		1–0	3–1	0–1
Solidarité SC	1–0	0–0	0–0	1–0	0–1	0–2	0–0	1–4	0–1	1–0	1–1		2–2	1–2
US Baie-Mahault	0–2	0–0	0–0	0–0	1–2	0–2	3–0	0–0	0–0	3–0	2–0	2–0		0–2
USR	2–0	1–2	3–1	3–0	3–1	4–2	2–0	2–2	0–0	1–0	2–3	1–0	3–2	

Updated to match(es) played on 24 May 2016. Source: RSSSF
Legend: Blue = home team win; Yellow = draw; Red = away team win.
