= 2016–17 Guadeloupe Division of Honor =

Guadeloupe Division of Honor
- Season: 2016–17
- Champions: USR
- Relegated: Bananier; Gosier; Red Star
- CFU Club Championship: USR; Gauloise
- Coupe de France: Moulien; Phare
- Biggest home win: Moulien 6–0 Capesterrien (19 Nov. 2016)
- Biggest away win: Excelsior 0–6 Rivière-Pilote (4 Feb. 2017)
- Highest scoring: USBM 2–5 Arsenal (15 Feb. 2016)
- All statistics correct as of 24 May 2017.

The 2016–17 Guadeloupe Division of Honor was the 66th season of the Guadeloupe Division of Honor, the top tier of association football in Guadeloupe. The season was contested by 14 teams, and began on 17 September 2016 and concluded on 19 May 2017.

Defending champions, USR, successfully defended their league title, finishing the season with 83 points and a 17-6-3 record. It was their second ever Guadeloupean league title. USR won the league title on 29 April 2017 with a 1-1 home draw against Phare.

== Changes from 2015–16 ==
At the end of last season, L'Etoile, Solidarité SC and Club Amical finished in 12th, 13th and 14th place in the league and were relegated to the Promotion d'Honneur Régionale. Taking their places were the winners, runners up and third place team from the Promotion d'Honneur Régionale, CS Capesterrien, AS Gosier and U.S.C. de Bananier.

== Table ==
Pos	Team	Pld	W	D	L	GF	GA	GD	Pts	Qualification or relegation
1	USR (C)	26	17	6	3	48	19	+29	83	2018 Caribbean Club Shield
2	Gauloise (Note: Gauloise was deducted 1 point.)	26	14	5	7	32	18	+14	72	
3	Moulien	26	12	8	6	30	16	+14	70	
4	Amical	26	12	8	6	32	25	+7	70	
5	USBM	26	12	7	7	31	23	+8	69	
6	Arsenal	26	9	8	9	30	28	+2	61	
7	Capesterrien	26	9	8	9	34	35	−1	61	
8	Siroco (Note: Siroco was deducted 1 point.)	26	10	5	11	32	33	−1	60	
9	Phare	26	8	6	12	26	31	−5	56	
10	Juventus (Note: Juventus was deducted 1 point.)	26	8	6	12	25	34	−9	55	
11	Gourbeyrienne (Note: Gourbeyrienne was deducted 1 point.)	26	7	7	12	19	34	−15	53	
12	Bananier (R)	26	6	7	13	23	39	−16	51	Relegation to 2017–18 Honorary Promotion Championship
13	Gosier (R)	26	5	8	13	17	31	−14	49	Relegation to 2017–18 Honorary Promotion Championship
14	Red Star (Note: Red Star was deducted 1 point.) (R)	26	6	5	15	20	33	−13	48	Relegation to 2017–18 Honorary Promotion Championship

Source: https://www.rsssf.org/tablesf/frant2017.html
(C) Champions;
(R) Relegated
