= 2017–18 Guadeloupe Division of Honor =

Guadeloupe Division of Honor
- Season: 2017–18
- Champions: CS Moulien
- Caribbean Club Shield: CS Moulien

The 2017–18 Guadeloupe Division of Honor is the 67th season of the Guadeloupe Division of Honor, the top tier of association football in Guadeloupe. The season began on 2 September 2017 and ended on 30 May 2018.

== League table ==
Note: 4 points for a win, 2 points for a draw, 1 point for a defeat.

Pos	Team	Pld	W	D	L	GF	GA	GD	Pts	Qualification or relegation
1	CS Moulien (C)	26	14	10	2	36	15	+21	78	Caribbean Club Shield
2	US Baie-Mahault	26	15	6	5	45	20	+25	77	
3	Phare du Canal	26	15	6	5	31	17	+14	77	
4	USR Sainte-Rose	26	12	7	7	33	19	+14	69	
5	L'Etoile	26	11	9	6	27	19	+8	68	
6	Solidarité-Scolaire	26	10	6	10	20	24	−4	62	
7	Siroco Les Abymes	26	8	9	9	25	25	0	59	
8	Amical	26	9	5	12	28	25	+3	58	
9	Arsenal	26	9	5	12	24	30	−6	58	
10	La Gauloise	26	8	8	10	21	27	−6	58	
11	Juventus (R)	26	7	10	9	31	34	−3	57	Relegation to Honorary Promotion Championship
12	Racing Club de Basse-Terre (R)	26	7	9	10	18	23	−5	56	Relegation to Honorary Promotion Championship
13	AO Gourbeyrienne (R)	26	3	10	13	15	30	−15	45	Relegation to Honorary Promotion Championship
14	CS Capesterrien (R)	26	1	6	19	17	63	−46	35	Relegation to Honorary Promotion Championship

Updated to match(es) played on May 30th 2018.
Source: https://www.rsssf.org/tablesf/frant2018.html
(C) Champions;
(R) Relegated
