= 2017 Caribbean Club Championship =

2017 CFU Club Championship

Tournament details
- Dates: 22 February – 21 May 2017
- Teams: 21 (from 12 associations)

Final positions
- Champions: (Dominican Republic) Cibao (1st title)
- Runners-up: (Trinidad and Tobago) San Juan Jabloteh
- Third place: (Jamaica) Portmore United
- Fourth place: (Trinidad and Tobago) Central

Tournament statistics
- Matches played: 38
- Goals scored: 164 (4.32 per match)
- Top scorer(s): (Haiti) Babalito (Antigua and Barbuda) Tevaughn Harriette (7 goals each)

The 2017 Caribbean Club Championship was the 19th edition of the Caribbean Club Championship (also known as the CFU Club Championship), the annual international club football competition in the Caribbean region, held amongst clubs whose football associations are affiliated with the Caribbean Football Union (CFU), a sub-confederation of CONCACAF.

The top four teams qualified for next season's CONCACAF club competitions, an increase from the previous three following the expansion of the CONCACAF club competition platform. The champions qualified for the CONCACAF Champions League tournament proper, while the second through fourth place teams qualified for the new Champions League qualifying tournament, the CONCACAF League.

Cibao won the tournament by defeating San Juan Jabloteh in the final, becoming the first team from the Dominican Republic to be crowned Caribbean club champions and the first to qualify for the CONCACAF Champions League. Runners-up San Juan Jabloteh, together with third place Portmore United and fourth place Central, who were the two-time defending champions, qualified for the first edition of the CONCACAF League.

== Teams ==
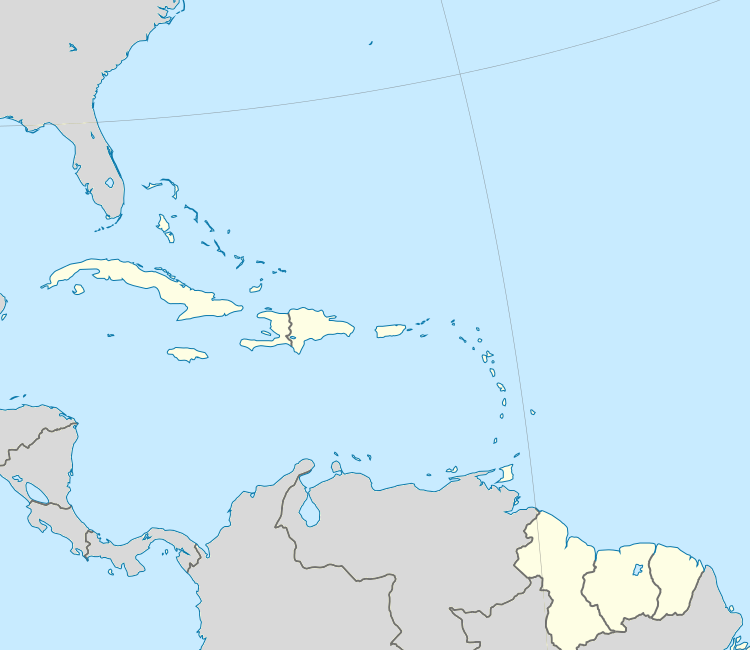
Location of teams of the 2017 Caribbean Club Championship
Red: Group A; Green: Group B; Blue: Group C;
Yellow: Group D; Purple: Group E; Pink: Bye to final round.

The tournament was open to all league champions and runners-up from each of the 31 CFU member associations, once their competition ended by the end of 2016.

A total of 21 teams from 12 CFU associations entered the competition. This is the first CFU Club Championship to feature a team from Sint Maarten, and the first since 2004 to feature a team from Montserrat.

The defending champions Central received a bye to the final round (to make room in the first round for Puerto Rico FC, who were left out of the original draw), while the other 20 teams entered the first round.

Association	Team	Qualification method
(Antigua and Barbuda) Antigua and Barbuda	Hoppers	2015–16 Antigua and Barbuda Premier Division champions
(Antigua and Barbuda) Antigua and Barbuda	Grenades	2015–16 Antigua and Barbuda Premier Division runners-up
(Cayman Islands) Cayman Islands	Scholars International	2015–16 Cayman Islands Premier League champions
(Cayman Islands) Cayman Islands	Elite	2015–16 Cayman Islands Premier League runners-up
(Dominican Republic) Dominican Republic	Barcelona Atlético	2016 Liga Dominicana de Fútbol champions
(Dominican Republic) Dominican Republic	Cibao	2016 Liga Dominicana de Fútbol runners-up
Guadeloupe	USR	2015–16 Guadeloupe Division of Honor champions
Guadeloupe	CS Moulien	2015–16 Guadeloupe Division of Honor runners-up
Haiti	Don Bosco	2015 Ligue Haïtienne Série d'Ouverture champions
Haiti	Racing des Gonaïves	2016 Ligue Haïtienne Série d'Ouverture champions
Jamaica	Montego Bay United	2015–16 National Premier League champions
Jamaica	Portmore United	2015–16 National Premier League runners-up
Montserrat	Police	2016 Montserrat Championship champions
(Puerto Rico) Puerto Rico	Puerto Rico FC	2016 Copa Luis Villarejo champions
(Saint Vincent and the Grenadines) Saint Vincent and the Grenadines	System 3	2016 NLA Premier League champions
(Saint Vincent and the Grenadines) Saint Vincent and the Grenadines	Bequia United	2016 NLA Premier League runners-up
(Sint Maarten) Sint Maarten	Flames United	2015 Sint Maarten League champions
Suriname	Inter Moengotapoe	2015–16 SVB Hoofdklasse champions
Suriname	Transvaal	2015–16 SVB Hoofdklasse runners-up
(Trinidad and Tobago) Trinidad and Tobago	Central	2015–16 TT Pro League champions (bye to final round as title holders)
(Trinidad and Tobago) Trinidad and Tobago	San Juan Jabloteh	2015–16 TT Pro League runners-up

Notes

1. Haiti (HAI): FICA, champions of the 2016 Ligue Haïtienne Série de Clôture, did not enter the tournament. So Don Bosco, champions of the 2015 Ligue Haïtienne Série d'Ouverture, were selected instead, having participated in the 2016 CFU Club Championship and qualified for the 2016–17 CONCACAF Champions League.
2. Puerto Rico (PUR): Puerto Rico's first division, the Liga Nacional de Fútbol de Puerto Rico (LNF), was not played in 2016. A new domestic cup tournament, the Copa Luis Villarejo, was inaugurated and involved teams from the LNF, the second tier Puerto Rico Soccer League (PRSL), as well as Puerto Rico FC of the North American Soccer League (NASL), a second tier league sanctioned by the United States Soccer Federation. The champions and runners-up of this tournament were to be eligible to enter the CFU Club Championship. The champions Puerto Rico FC announced that they would enter the CFU Club Championship, but the runners-up Criollos de Caguas (a top tier club) announced that they would not enter the CFU Club Championship, citing financial difficulties. The Puerto Rican Football Federation stated that only champions Puerto Rico FC would enter, but added that they had requested permission from CONCACAF to allow semi-finalist Metropolitan FA (a second tier club) to replace Criollos de Caguas, but this eventually did not happen. However, in the original draw announced on 16 January 2017, Puerto Rico FC were left out. Puerto Rico FC President Tom Payne tweeted that his team should have been involved in the draw and that a mistake had been made between the Puerto Rican Football Federation, Caribbean Football Union and CONCACAF. They were admitted to the competition on 26 January, taking defending champion Central's place as Group D hosts, while Central were given a bye to the final round.
3. Sint Maarten (SXM): No domestic league competition was completed in 2016 in Sint Maarten, so they were represented by Flames United, champions of the 2015 Sint Maarten League.

Associations which did not enter a team

- Anguilla
- Aruba
- (The Bahamas) Bahamas
- Barbados
- Bermuda
- Bonaire
- (British Virgin Islands) British Virgin Islands
- Cuba
- Curaçao
- Dominica
- (French Guiana) French Guiana
- Grenada
- Guyana
- Martinique
- (Saint Kitts and Nevis) Saint Kitts and Nevis
- (Saint Lucia) Saint Lucia
- (Collectivity of Saint Martin) Saint-Martin
- (Turks and Caicos Islands) Turks and Caicos Islands
- (United States Virgin Islands) U.S. Virgin Islands

== Schedule ==
The original groups and schedule were announced by CFU and CONCACAF on 16 January 2017, with the revised groups and schedule after the admission of Puerto Rico FC announced on 26 January 2017.

Round	Dates	
First round	Group A	22–26 February 2017
First round	Groups B & C	1–5 March 2017
First round	Groups D	14–18 March 2017
First round	Groups E	8–12 March 2017
Final round	14–21 May 2017	

== First round ==
In the first round, the 20 teams were divided into five groups of four teams. Each group was played on a round-robin basis, hosted by one of the teams at a centralized venue. The winners of each group advanced to the final round to join the defending champions Central.

=== Group A ===
Host venue: Antigua Recreation Ground, St. John's, Antigua and Barbuda (all times UTC−4)

Pos	Team	Pld	W	D	L	GF	GA	GD	Pts	Qualification
1	(Haiti) Racing des Gonaïves	3	2	1	0	8	2	+6	7	Final round
2	(Suriname) Inter Moengotapoe	3	2	1	0	8	3	+5	7	
3	(Antigua and Barbuda) Hoppers (H)	3	1	0	2	2	5	−3	3	
4	(Saint Vincent and the Grenadines) Bequia United	3	0	0	3	2	10	−8	0	

Source: CONCACAF
(H) Hosts
22 February 2017
17:00

Racing des Gonaïves (Haiti)	2–2	(Suriname) Inter Moengotapoe
Dorisca 17', 81'	Report	K. Kwasie 9'; N. Kwasie 68'

Antigua Recreation Ground, St. John's
22 February 2017
19:30

Hoppers (Antigua and Barbuda)	2–1	(Saint Vincent and the Grenadines) Bequia United
Thomas 16'; Bess 70' (o.g.)	Report	Ollivierre 28'

Antigua Recreation Ground, St. John's

24 February 2017
17:00

Bequia United (Saint Vincent and the Grenadines)	0–4	(Haiti) Racing des Gonaïves
	Report	Laurent 9'; Charles 16'; Dorisca 25'; Jean 41' (pen.)

Antigua Recreation Ground, St. John's
24 February 2017
19:30

Hoppers (Antigua and Barbuda)	0–2	(Suriname) Inter Moengotapoe
	Report	Rijssel 47'; Fer 82'

Antigua Recreation Ground, St. John's

26 February 2017
17:00

Inter Moengotapoe (Suriname)	4–1	(Saint Vincent and the Grenadines) Bequia United
Rijssel 22'; Vallei 65' (pen.); K. Kwasie 90', 90+4'	Report	Browne 39' (pen.)

Antigua Recreation Ground, St. John's
26 February 2017
19:30

Hoppers (Antigua and Barbuda)	0–2	(Haiti) Racing des Gonaïves
	Report	Charles 38'; Daniel 43'

Antigua Recreation Ground, St. John's

=== Group B ===
Host venue: Stade Sylvio Cator, Port-au-Prince, Haiti (all times UTC−5)

Pos	Team	Pld	W	D	L	GF	GA	GD	Pts	Qualification
1	(Dominican Republic) Cibao	3	2	1	0	18	1	+17	7	Final round
2	(Haiti) Don Bosco (H)	3	1	2	0	13	2	+11	5	
3	(Guadeloupe) USR	3	1	1	1	11	2	+9	4	
4	(Montserrat) Police	3	0	0	3	0	37	−37	0	

Source: CONCACAF
(H) Hosts
1 March 2017
17:00

Police (Montserrat)	0–16	(Dominican Republic) Cibao
	Report	Babalito 2', 12', 15', 48'; Jáquez 4', 25'; Peralta 34', 41', 42', 51'; Hérold Jr. 45', 90+3'; Soko 68', 83'; Rodríguez 75'; Acevedo 82'

Stade Sylvio Cator, Port-au-Prince
1 March 2017
19:00

Don Bosco (Haiti)	1–1	(Guadeloupe) USR
G. Joseph 38'	Report	Désert 12'

Stade Sylvio Cator, Port-au-Prince

3 March 2017
17:00

Cibao (Dominican Republic)	1–0	(Guadeloupe) USR
Peralta 78'	Report

Stade Sylvio Cator, Port-au-Prince
3 March 2017
19:00

Don Bosco (Haiti)	11–0	(Montserrat) Police
Estama 1'; Vernet 6'; Georges 13', 26', 33', 45', 62'; G. Joseph 39'; St-Hubert 41'; M. Joseph 55', 75'	Report

Stade Sylvio Cator, Port-au-Prince

5 March 2017
17:00

USR (Guadeloupe)	10–0	(Montserrat) Police
Nestor 10', 14'; Huggins 22' (o.g.); Santos 25' (pen.); Nascimiento 26'; Mathaisan 39', 59', 81'; Dan 56'; Gotin 88' (pen.)	Report

Stade Sylvio Cator, Port-au-Prince
5 March 2017
19:00

Don Bosco (Haiti)	1–1	(Dominican Republic) Cibao
Georges 23'	Report	Babalito 29'

Stade Sylvio Cator, Port-au-Prince

=== Group C ===
Host venue: Montego Bay Sports Complex, Montego Bay, Jamaica (all times UTC−5)

Pos	Team	Pld	W	D	L	GF	GA	GD	Pts	Qualification
1	(Antigua and Barbuda) Grenades	3	2	1	0	7	4	+3	7	Final round
2	(Dominican Republic) Barcelona Atlético	3	1	2	0	8	4	+4	5	
3	(Jamaica) Montego Bay United (H)	3	1	1	1	9	5	+4	4	
4	(Cayman Islands) Elite	3	0	0	3	0	11	−11	0	

Source: CONCACAF
(H) Hosts
1 March 2017
17:30

Barcelona Atlético (Dominican Republic)	4–0	(Cayman Islands) Elite
Castillo 53'; Meza 54', 71'; Guerra 73'	Report

Montego Bay Sports Complex, Montego Bay
1 March 2017
20:00

Montego Bay United (Jamaica)	2–3	(Antigua and Barbuda) Grenades
Weatherly 82'; Gordon 90+4'	Report	Harriette 13', 31'; McBurnette 67'

Montego Bay Sports Complex, Montego Bay

3 March 2017
17:30

Grenades (Antigua and Barbuda)	2–2	(Dominican Republic) Barcelona Atlético
Henry 36' (pen.); Harriette 59'	Report	Guerra 32', 42'

Montego Bay Sports Complex, Montego Bay
3 March 2017
20:00

Montego Bay United (Jamaica)	5–0	(Cayman Islands) Elite
Williams 14'; Rodney 60'; Gordon 74', 77'; Weatherly 90+3'	Report

Montego Bay Sports Complex, Montego Bay

5 March 2017
17:30

Elite (Cayman Islands)	0–2	(Antigua and Barbuda) Grenades
	Report	Harriette 56', 67'

Montego Bay Sports Complex, Montego Bay
5 March 2017
20:00

Montego Bay United (Jamaica)	2–2	(Dominican Republic) Barcelona Atlético
Gordon 81' (pen.); Williams 85'	Report	Meza 32'; Díaz 61'

Montego Bay Sports Complex, Montego Bay

=== Group D ===
Host venue: Estadio Juan Ramón Loubriel, Bayamón, Puerto Rico (all times UTC−4)

Pos	Team	Pld	W	D	L	GF	GA	GD	Pts	Qualification
1	(Jamaica) Portmore United	3	3	0	0	9	1	+8	9	Final round
2	Puerto Rico FC (H)	3	2	0	1	5	1	+4	6	
3	(Suriname) Transvaal	3	1	0	2	5	7	−2	3	
4	(Cayman Islands) Scholars International	3	0	0	3	0	10	−10	0	

Source: CONCACAF
(H) Hosts
14 March 2017
17:30

Scholars International (Cayman Islands)	0–2	(Jamaica) Portmore United
	Report	Morris 8'; Lynch 21'

Estadio Juan Ramón Loubriel, Bayamón
Referee: Charvis Delsol (Dominica)
14 March 2017
20:00

Puerto Rico FC	1–0	(Suriname) Transvaal
H. Ramos 28' (pen.)	Report

Estadio Juan Ramón Loubriel, Bayamón
Referee: Ismael Cornejo (El Salvador)

16 March 2017
17:30

Transvaal (Suriname)	4–0	(Cayman Islands) Scholars International
Akoela 28'; Ferreira 48'; Juliaans 88'; Boldewijn 90+1'	Report

Estadio Juan Ramón Loubriel, Bayamón
Referee: Jacques Robert Arthur (Haiti)
16 March 2017
20:00

Puerto Rico FC	0–1	(Jamaica) Portmore United
	Report	Morris 90+1'

Estadio Juan Ramón Loubriel, Bayamón
Referee: Saíd Martínez (Honduras)

18 March 2017
17:30

Portmore United (Jamaica)	6–1	(Suriname) Transvaal
McCalla 20'; Doorson 24' (o.g.); Stewart 33'; Pryce 52' (pen.); Grandison 56'; Foster 81'	Report	Comvalius 66'

Estadio Juan Ramón Loubriel, Bayamón
Referee: Ismael Cornejo (El Salvador)
18 March 2017
20:00

Puerto Rico FC	4–0	(Cayman Islands) Scholars International
M. Ramos 14'; Rivera 35'; Bement 51'; Dias 57'	Report

Estadio Juan Ramón Loubriel, Bayamón
Referee: Jacques Robert Arthur (Haiti)

=== Group E ===
Host venue: Victoria Park, Kingstown, Saint Vincent and the Grenadines (all times UTC−4)

Pos	Team	Pld	W	D	L	GF	GA	GD	Pts	Qualification
1	(Trinidad and Tobago) San Juan Jabloteh	3	3	0	0	14	1	+13	9	Final round
2	(Guadeloupe) CS Moulien	3	2	0	1	13	4	+9	6	
3	(Saint Vincent and the Grenadines) System 3 (H)	3	1	0	2	9	7	+2	3	
4	(Sint Maarten) Flames United	3	0	0	3	2	26	−24	0	

Source: CONCACAF
(H) Hosts
8 March 2017
17:00

Flames United (Sint Maarten)	0–9	(Trinidad and Tobago) San Juan Jabloteh
	Report	Simpson 11', 51', 58'; Lewis 22', 40', 44'; Lombardo 57'; Charles 72'; Gay 82'

Victoria Park, Kingstown
8 March 2017
19:30

System 3 (Saint Vincent and the Grenadines)	0–4	(Guadeloupe) CS Moulien
	Report	Bolmin 38'; Lowman 49' (o.g.); Pascal 65'; Bizasène 82'

Victoria Park, Kingstown

10 March 2017
17:00

San Juan Jabloteh (Trinidad and Tobago)	4–1	(Guadeloupe) CS Moulien
Mills 17'; Lombardo 20', 68'; Lewis 85'	Report	Gomez 13'

Victoria Park, Kingstown
10 March 2017
19:30

System 3 (Saint Vincent and the Grenadines)	9–2	(Sint Maarten) Flames United
Solomon 5', 62', 71'; Samuel 45', 45+1', 54'; Osment 60'; Bascombe 87'; Edwards 90+3'	Report	Martin 58'; Haird 65'

Victoria Park, Kingstown

12 March 2017
17:00

CS Moulien (Guadeloupe)	8–0	(Sint Maarten) Flames United
Anatol 2'; Clavier 8', 18', 37', 90+3'; Pascal 45', 52', 88'	Report

Victoria Park, Kingstown
12 March 2017
19:30

System 3 (Saint Vincent and the Grenadines)	0–1	(Trinidad and Tobago) San Juan Jabloteh
	Report	Charles 65'

Victoria Park, Kingstown

== Final round ==
In the final round, the six teams (the defending champions Central, which received a bye to the final round, and the five group winners from the first round) were drawn into two groups of three teams (initially the final round was to be played in one group). Each group was played on a round-robin basis. The winners of each group advanced to the final, while the runners-up advanced to the third place match.

The draw of the final round was held on 29 March 2017. Central, as the hosts of the final round, and San Juan Jabloteh, as the best performing team in the first round, were seeded into Groups A and B respectively.

The champions qualified for the 2018 CONCACAF Champions League, while the teams finishing second through fourth qualified for the 2017 CONCACAF League.

Host venue: Hasely Crawford Stadium, Port of Spain, Trinidad and Tobago (all times UTC−4)

=== Group A ===
Pos	Team	Pld	W	D	L	GF	GA	GD	Pts	Qualification
1	(Dominican Republic) Cibao	2	1	1	0	3	2	+1	4	Final
2	(Trinidad and Tobago) Central (H)	2	1	0	1	3	2	+1	3	Third place match and 2017 CONCACAF League
3	(Antigua and Barbuda) Grenades	2	0	1	1	3	5	−2	1	

Source: CONCACAF
(H) Hosts
14 May 2017
20:00

Central (Trinidad and Tobago)	3–1	(Antigua and Barbuda) Grenades
Marcano 37'; Edwards 45'; García 85'	Report	Harriette 6'

Hasely Crawford Stadium, Port of Spain
Referee: Sherwin Moore (Guyana)

16 May 2017
20:00

Cibao (Dominican Republic)	2–2	(Antigua and Barbuda) Grenades
Babalito 54', 56'	Report	Harriette 85'; García 86' (o.g.)

Hasely Crawford Stadium, Port of Spain
Referee: Mario Escobar (Guatemala)

18 May 2017
20:00

Central (Trinidad and Tobago)	0–1	(Dominican Republic) Cibao
	Report	Soko 54'

Hasely Crawford Stadium, Port of Spain
Referee: Ricangel de Leça (Aruba)

=== Group B ===
Pos	Team	Pld	W	D	L	GF	GA	GD	Pts	Qualification
1	(Trinidad and Tobago) San Juan Jabloteh (H)	2	1	1	0	4	2	+2	4	Final
2	(Jamaica) Portmore United	2	1	1	0	3	2	+1	4	Third place match and 2017 CONCACAF League
3	(Haiti) Racing des Gonaïves	2	0	0	2	0	3	−3	0	

Source: CONCACAF
(H) Hosts
14 May 2017
17:30

San Juan Jabloteh (Trinidad and Tobago)	2–0	(Haiti) Racing des Gonaïves
Lewis 50'; Mitchelson 74' (o.g.)	Report

Hasely Crawford Stadium, Port of Spain
Referee: Ricangel de Leça (Aruba)

16 May 2017
17:30

Portmore United (Jamaica)	1–0	(Haiti) Racing des Gonaïves
Morris 17'	Report

Hasely Crawford Stadium, Port of Spain
Referee: Gianni Ascani (Turks and Caicos Islands)

18 May 2017
17:30

San Juan Jabloteh (Trinidad and Tobago)	2–2	(Jamaica) Portmore United
Reid 34' (pen.); Mills 41'	Report	Lynch 85'; Grandison 87'

Hasely Crawford Stadium, Port of Spain
Referee: Sherwin Moore (Guyana)

=== Third place match ===
21 May 2017
17:00

Central (Trinidad and Tobago)	2–2 (a.e.t.)	(Jamaica) Portmore United
Marcano 5'; George 90+2'	Report	D. Binns 32'; Pryce 77'
Penalties
da Silva (penalty missed); Edwards (penalty scored); George (penalty scored); Bannister (penalty scored)	3–5	(penalty scored) M. Binns; (penalty scored) Grandison; (penalty scored) D. Binns; (penalty scored) Lynch; (penalty scored) Foster

Hasely Crawford Stadium, Port of Spain
Referee: Gianni Ascani (Turks and Caicos Islands)

=== Final ===
Winners qualified for 2018 CONCACAF Champions League. Runners-up qualified for 2017 CONCACAF League.

21 May 2017
20:00

Cibao (Dominican Republic)	1–0	(Trinidad and Tobago) San Juan Jabloteh
Dabas 30'	Report

Hasely Crawford Stadium, Port of Spain
Referee: Mario Escobar (Guatemala)

== Top goalscorers ==
Rank	Player	Team	Goals
1	(Haiti) Babalito	(Dominican Republic) Cibao	7
1	(Antigua and Barbuda) Tevaughn Harriette	(Antigua and Barbuda) Grenades	7
3	(Haiti) Kerlins Georges	(Haiti) Don Bosco	6
4	(Trinidad and Tobago) Nathan Lewis	(Trinidad and Tobago) San Juan Jabloteh	5
4	(Dominican Republic) Domingo Peralta	(Dominican Republic) Cibao	5
6	(Guadeloupe) Larry Clavier	(Guadeloupe) CS Moulien	4
6	(Jamaica) Owayne Gordon	(Jamaica) Montego Bay United	4
6	(Guadeloupe) Vladimir Pascal	(Guadeloupe) CS Moulien	4
9	(Haiti) Marckens Dorisca	(Haiti) Racing des Gonaïves	3
9	(Colombia) José Adolfo Guerra	(Dominican Republic) Barcelona Atlético	3
9	(Suriname) Kareem Kwasie	(Suriname) Inter Moengotapoe	3
9	(Panama) Jairo Lombardo	(Trinidad and Tobago) San Juan Jabloteh	3
9	(Guadeloupe) Marc Mathaisan	(Guadeloupe) USR	3
9	(Venezuela) Jesús Meza	(Dominican Republic) Barcelona Atlético	3
9	(Jamaica) Ricardo Morris	(Jamaica) Portmore United	3
9	(Saint Vincent and the Grenadines) Myron Samuel	(Saint Vincent and the Grenadines) System 3	3
9	(Jamaica) Keithy Simpson	(Trinidad and Tobago) San Juan Jabloteh	3
9	(Cameroon) Patrick Serge Soko	(Dominican Republic) Cibao	3
9	(Saint Vincent and the Grenadines) Azinho Solomon	(Saint Vincent and the Grenadines) System 3	3

== See also ==
- 2017 CONCACAF League
- 2018 CONCACAF Champions League
