= Tino Costa =

Argentine footballer (born 1985)

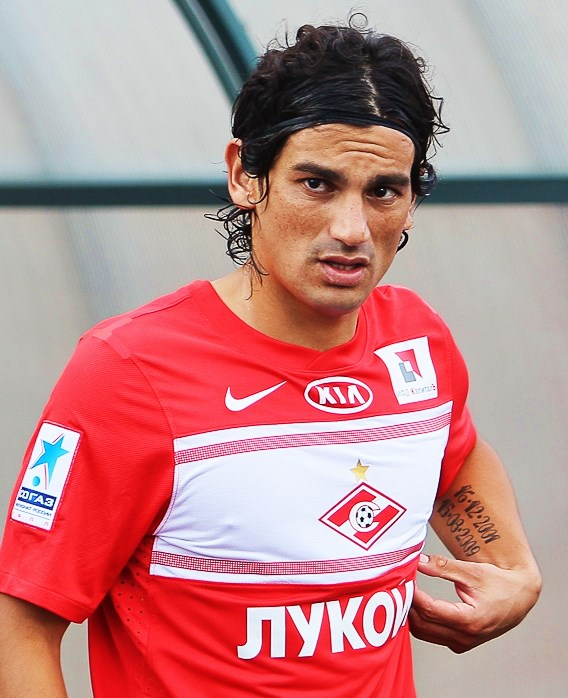
- Costa with Spartak Moscow in 2013

Personal information
- Full name: Alberto Facundo Costa
- Date of birth: 9 January 1985 (age 41)
- Place of birth: Las Flores, Argentina
- Height: 1.76 m (5 ft 9 in)
- Position: Midfielder

Youth career
- 1996–2002: La Terrazza

Senior career*
| Years | Team | Apps | (Gls) |
| 2002–2004 | Racing Club B-T | | |
| 2004–2005 | RCF Paris | 28 | (3) |
| 2005–2007 | Pau | 62 | (4) |
| 2007–2008 | Sète | 29 | (3) |
| 2008–2010 | Montpellier | 66 | (15) |
| 2010–2013 | Valencia | 84 | (10) |
| 2013–2016 | Spartak Moscow | 31 | (3) |
| 2015–2016 | → Genoa (loan) | 18 | (2) |
| 2016 | → Fiorentina (loan) | 7 | (0) |
| 2016–2017 | San Lorenzo | 8 | (0) |
| 2017–2018 | Almería | 14 | (2) |
| 2018–2019 | San Martín Tucumán | 13 | (4) |
| 2019–2020 | Atlético Nacional | 11 | (1) |
| 2020–2023 | San Martín Tucumán | 48 | (6) |
| 2023 | Deportivo Morón | 2 | (0) |
| 2023–2024 | Pau | 3 | (0) |
| 2023 | Pau B | 1 | (0) |
| Total | | 425+ | (53+) |

International career
| 2011–2012 | Argentina | 2 | (0) |
- * Club domestic league appearances and goals

Alberto Facundo "Tino" Costa (born 9 January 1985) is an Argentine former professional footballer who played as a midfielder.

== Club career ==
=== Early career ===
Costa, commonly known as Tino, began his career in Argentina playing for local club La Terrazza. At the age of 17, he made the highly risky decision of leaving the country for the island of Guadeloupe to play for Racing Club de Basse-Terre in the Guadeloupe Division d'Honneur. During his time there, he went to school and worked at a supermarket.

Costa spent two years at the island club helping the club win the league and cup double. He played in the 2004 edition of the Coupe de Guadeloupe final, helping his club defeat AS Gosier by a score of 3–1. After two years in Guadeloupe, his great play caught the attention of Racing Club de Paris, who offered the player a trial. Racing, who were playing in the third-tier National, signed the player and Costa played one season for the club appearing in 28 total matches scoring 3 goals.

=== Pau ===
The following season, Costa joined Pau, another club in the National. At Pau, he appeared in 62 total matches, scoring 4 goals, with Pau barely avoiding relegation in both years he spent there.

=== Sète ===
After leaving Pau, Costa joined his third National club in FC Sète. There, he became a household name in the league, appearing in 29 total matches, scoring 3 goals, and helping Sète come within seven points of promotion. He also assisted on several goals and collected nine yellow cards. For his efforts, he was named the league's top player, which led to interest from clubs in the higher divisions.

=== Montpellier ===
Costa signed with Montpellier of Ligue 2 for the 2008–09 season, after agreeing to a three-year contract. He made his debut for the club in their opening match of the season, playing the full 90 minutes in their loss to Strasbourg. He scored his first career goal for the club a few weeks later in their 4–0 demolition of Reims. He was held scoreless for the majority of the fall season, before returning to form mid-season scoring a brace against Boulogne. In a span of six weeks, during the latter part of the season, Costa scored goals against Dijon, Châteauroux, Brest, and Clermont. As a result, Montpellier were among the head of the pack for promotion to Ligue 1. The club's future was determined on the final day of the season with a 2–1 victory over Strasbourg, who were also fighting for promotion. Costa scored the eventual game-winning goal in the 19th minute, helping Montpellier return to Ligue 1 play. For the entire season, Costa scored 8 goals and assisted on 11 goals. He was nominated for the Ligue 2 Player of the Year award, but lost out to the Cameroonian Paul Alo'o.

Following the season, several Ligue 1 clubs began inquiring for Costa's services, most notably RC Lens and Toulouse. However, Costa refuted any claims of leaving the city of Montpellier and signed a contract extension on 1 July 2009 until the year 2013. Despite missing the club's opening 1–1 draw with Paris Saint-Germain, Costa made his Ligue 1 debut against Lorient scoring the club's opening goal in the 60th minute. The match ended in a 2–2 draw. The following week, he scored again, this time in a 2–0 victory over Sochaux. Two weeks later, he converted a 39th-minute penalty against Lens. The goal turned out to be the winner.

=== Valencia ===
On 1 July 2010, Costa joined La Liga club Valencia on a four-year contract for a transfer fee of €6.5 million. He scored his first goal for Valencia on his debut in the UEFA Champions League. The midfielder shot accurately from 30 yards out, and Valencia went on to win 0–4 at Bursaspor. He scored his first league goal for Valencia against Getafe on 14 November 2010. On 18 December, he scored his second league goal from 35 yards out when he converted a free-kick against Real Sociedad.

He acquired French nationality by naturalization in 2011.

=== Spartak Moscow ===
On 5 June 2013, it was announced that Costa left Valencia to go to Russian giants Spartak Moscow for €7 million transfer fee.

==== Loans to Genoa and Fiorentina ====
It was confirmed that Costa would join Serie A side Genoa for the 2015–16 season. On 15 January 2016, Fiorentina confirmed the six-month loan signing of Costa with a view to a permanent option at the end of the season.

=== San Lorenzo ===
At midnight on 21 July 2016, it was announced that Costa left Spartak to go to Argentinian giants San Lorenzo as a free agent. However, he only appeared in eight matches for the club during his spell.

=== Almería ===
On 1 August 2017, Costa signed a one-year deal with UD Almería in Segunda División. He contributed with two goals in only 14 appearances, as his season was marred by injuries.

=== Second stint at Pau ===
In September 2023, at the age of 38, and having been without a club since last March, Tino Costa signed a one-year contract with Pau FC, one of his first professional clubs, where he played for two seasons between 2005 and 2007. Without a club since March, Costa had been training with Pau since September 4. Costa's excellent physical condition prompted the Maynats' officials to offer him a one-year contract.

In May 2024, Costa announced his retirement.

== Career statistics ==
As of 1 August 2020

Appearances and goals by club, season and competition
| Club | Season | League | | | Cup (Note: Includes Copa del Rey, Supercopa de España, Coupe de France, Coupe de la Ligue, Coupe de Guadeloupe, Trophée des Champions) | | Europe (Note: Includes UEFA Supercup) | | Total | |
| Club | Season | Division | Apps | Goals | Apps | Goals | Apps | Goals | Apps | Goals |
|---|---|---|---|---|---|---|---|---|---|---|
| RC Basse-Terre | 2003–04 | Guadeloupe Division of Honour | – | – | – | – | – | – | – | – |
| Racing Paris | 2004–05 | National | 28 | 3 | 0 | 0 | 0 | 0 | 28 | 3 |
| Pau | 2005–06 | National | 31 | 2 | 1 | 0 | 0 | 0 | 32 | 2 |
| Pau | 2006–07 | National | 31 | 2 | 1 | 0 | 0 | 0 | 32 | 2 |
| Pau | Total | | 62 | 4 | 2 | 0 | 0 | 0 | 64 | 4 |
| Sète | 2007–08 | National | 29 | 3 | 0 | 0 | 0 | 0 | 29 | 3 |
| Montpellier | 2008–09 | Ligue 2 | 35 | 8 | 2 | 0 | 0 | 0 | 37 | 8 |
| Montpellier | 2009–10 | Ligue 1 | 31 | 7 | 2 | 0 | 0 | 0 | 33 | 7 |
| Montpellier | Total | | 66 | 15 | 4 | 0 | 0 | 0 | 70 | 15 |
| Valencia | 2010–11 | La Liga | 24 | 4 | 1 | 0 | 7 | 2 | 32 | 6 |
| Valencia | 2011–12 | La Liga | 27 | 5 | 5 | 1 | 9 | 1 | 41 | 7 |
| Valencia | 2012–13 | La Liga | 31 | 1 | 3 | 2 | 8 | 0 | 42 | 3 |
| Valencia | Total | | 82 | 10 | 9 | 3 | 24 | 3 | 115 | 16 |
| Spartak Moscow | 2013–14 | Russian Premier League | 24 | 3 | 1 | 0 | 2 | 0 | 27 | 3 |
| Spartak Moscow | 2014–15 | Russian Premier League | 7 | 0 | 1 | 0 | 0 | 0 | 8 | 0 |
| Spartak Moscow | Total | | 31 | 3 | 2 | 0 | 2 | 0 | 35 | 3 |
| Genoa (loan) | 2014–15 | Serie A | 6 | 2 | 0 | 0 | 0 | 0 | 6 | 2 |
| Genoa (loan) | 2015–16 | Serie A | 12 | 0 | 0 | 0 | 0 | 0 | 12 | 0 |
| Genoa (loan) | Total | | 18 | 2 | 0 | 0 | 0 | 0 | 18 | 2 |
| Fiorentina (loan) | 2015–16 | Serie A | 7 | 0 | 0 | 0 | 1 | 0 | 8 | 0 |
| San Lorenzo | 2016–17 | Argentine Primera División | 8 | 0 | 2 | 0 | 3 | 0 | 13 | 0 |
| Almería | 2017–18 | Segunda División | 14 | 2 | 1 | 0 | 0 | 0 | 15 | 2 |
| San Martín Tucumán | 2018–19 | Argentine Primera División | 13 | 4 | 2 | 0 | 0 | 0 | 15 | 4 |
| Atlético Nacional | 2019 | Categoría Primera A | 9 | 1 | 2 | 0 | 0 | 0 | 11 | 1 |
| Atlético Nacional | 2020 | Categoría Primera A | 2 | 0 | 0 | 0 | 0 | 0 | 2 | 0 |
| Atlético Nacional | Total | | 11 | 1 | 2 | 0 | 0 | 0 | 13 | 1 |
| San Martín Tucumán | 2020 | Primera B Nacional | 0 | 0 | 0 | 0 | 0 | 0 | 0 | 0 |
| Career total | | | 369 | 47 | 24 | 3 | 30 | 3 | 423 | 53 |

== Honours ==
Racing Club B-T

- Guadeloupe Division d'Honneur: 2003–04
- Coupe de Guadeloupe: 2004
