= 1989 CONCACAF Champions' Cup =

Tournament details
- Dates: 8 March 1989 – 6 February 1990
- Teams: 29 (from 15 associations)

Final positions
- Champions: (Mexico) UNAM (3rd title)
- Runners-up: (Cuba) Pinar del Río

Tournament statistics
- Matches played: 62
- Goals scored: 191 (3.08 per match)
- Top scorer(s): Jorge Campos (UNAM); 7 goals

The 1989 CONCACAF Champions' Cup was the 25th edition of the CONCACAF Champions' Cup, the premier football club competition organized by CONCACAF, the regional governing body of North America, Central America, and the Caribbean.

UNAM won the final 4–2 on aggregate for their third CONCACAF club title.

== Format ==
The teams were split in two zones, North/Central American and Caribbean, (as North and Central American sections combined to qualify one team for the final), each one qualifying the winner to the final tournament. All the matches in the tournament were played under the home/away match system.

== North/Central American Zone ==
=== Preliminary round ===
Team 1	Agg.	Team 2	1st leg	2nd leg
Coke Milpross (Belize)	4–1	(Nicaragua) Diriangén	3–0	1–1
América (Nicaragua)	1–3	(Panama) La Previsora	1–1	0–2

16 April 1989

Coke Milpross (Belize)	3–0	(Nicaragua) Diriangén

30 April 1989

Diriangén (Nicaragua)	1–1	(Belize) Coke Milpross

Coke Milpross won 4–1 on aggregate.

16 April 1989

América (Nicaragua)	1–1	(Panama) La Previsora

30 April 1989

La Previsora (Panama)	0–2	(Nicaragua) América

América won 3–1 on aggregate.

=== First round ===
==== North American series ====
Team 1	Agg.	Team 2	1st leg	2nd leg
St. Louis Busch S.C. (United States)	1–8	(Mexico) UdeG	1–0	0–8
San Francisco Greek-American (United States)	3–7	(Mexico) UNAM	2–2	1–5

14 March 1989

St. Louis Busch S.C. (United States)	1–0	(Mexico) UdeG

25 April 1989

UdeG (Mexico)	8–0	(United States) St. Louis Busch S.C.

UdeG won 8–1 on aggregate.

22 March 1989

San Francisco Greek-American (United States)	2–2	(Mexico) UNAM

19 April 1989

UNAM (Mexico)	5–1	(United States) San Francisco Greek-American

UNAM won 7–3 on aggregate.

==== Central American series ====
Team 1	Agg.	Team 2	1st leg	2nd leg
Duurly's (Belize)	2–9	(Panama) La Previsora	0–3	2–6
Coke Milpross (Belize)	2–5	(Panama) Plaza Amador	1–1	1–4

28 May 1989

Duurly's (Belize)	0–3	(Panama) La Previsora

16 June 1989

La Previsora (Panama)	6–2	(Belize) Duurly's

La Previsora won 9–2 on aggregate.

4 June 1989

Coke Milpross (Belize)	1–1	(Panama) Plaza Amador

25 June 1989

Plaza Amador (Panama)	4–1	(Belize) Coke Milpross

Plaza Amador won 5–2 on aggregate.

==== Central American group stage ====
Group 1

Pos	Team	Pld	W	D	L	GF	GA	GD	Pts	Qualification	(Costa Rica) CAR	(Honduras) ESP	(El Salvador) LÁF	(Guatemala) AUR
1	(Costa Rica) Cartaginés	3	2	0	1	4	1	+3	4	Advance to third round	—	0–1	1–0	3–0
2	(Honduras) Real España	3	1	2	0	2	1	+1	4	Advance to third round	1–0	—	0–0	1–1
3	(El Salvador) Luis Ángel Firpo	3	0	2	1	1	2	−1	2		0–1	0–0	—	1–1
4	(Guatemala) Aurora	3	0	2	1	2	5	−3	2		0–3	1–1	1–1	—

Source: RSSSF

Group 2

Pos	Team	Pld	W	D	L	GF	GA	GD	Pts	Qualification	(Honduras) OLI	(Costa Rica) HER	(Guatemala) MUN	(El Salvador) COJ
1	(Honduras) Olimpia	3	2	1	0	7	4	+3	5	Advance to third round	—	2–1	2–2	3–1
2	(Costa Rica) Herediano	3	2	0	1	7	5	+2	4	Advance to third round	1–2	—	3–2	3–1
3	(Guatemala) Municipal	3	0	2	1	5	6	−1	2		2–2	2–3	—	1–1
4	(El Salvador) Cojutepeque	3	0	1	2	3	7	−4	1		1–3	1–3	1–1	—

Source: RSSSF

=== Second round ===
==== North/Central American series ====
Team 1	Agg.	Team 2	1st leg	2nd leg
La Previsora (Panama)	5–6	(Mexico) UdeG	0–1	5–5 (a.e.t.)
Plaza Amador (Panama)	0–10	(Mexico) UNAM	0–4	0–6

12 August 1989

La Previsora (Panama)	0–1	(Mexico) UdeG

Estadio Rommel Fernández - Panama City, Panama
31 August 1989

UdeG (Mexico)	5–5 (a.e.t.)	(Panama) La Previsora

Estadio Jalisco - Guadalajara, Mexico

UdeG won 6–5 on aggregate.

20 August 1989

Plaza Amador (Panama)	0-4	(Mexico) UNAM

Estadio Rommel Fernández - Panama City, Panama
27 August 1989

UNAM (Mexico)	6–0	(Panama) Plaza Amador
Luis García x 2 Enrique González x 2

Estadio Olímpico Universitario - Mexico City, Mexico

UNAM won 10–0 on aggregate.

==== Central American group stage ====
Pos	Team	Pld	W	D	L	GF	GA	GD	Pts	Qualification	(Honduras) OLI	(Costa Rica) HER	(Honduras) ESP	(Costa Rica) CAR
1	(Honduras) Olimpia	3	3	0	0	8	1	+7	6	Advance to third round	—	2–1	3–0	3–0
2	(Costa Rica) Herediano	3	1	1	1	6	5	+1	3	Advance to third round	1–2	—	3–1	2–2
3	(Honduras) Real España	3	1	0	2	3	6	−3	2		0–3	1–3	—	2–0
4	(Costa Rica) Cartaginés	3	0	1	2	2	7	−5	1		0–3	2–2	0–2	—

Source: RSSSF
11 June 1989

Real España (Honduras)	1–3	(Costa Rica) Herediano

Tegucigalpa
11 June 1989

Olimpia (Honduras)	3–0	(Costa Rica) Cartaginés

Tegucigalpa

14 June 1989

Herediano (Costa Rica)	2–2	(Costa Rica) Cartaginés

Tegucigalpa
14 June 1989

Olimpia (Honduras)	3–0	(Honduras) Real España

Tegucigalpa

18 June 1989

Real España (Honduras)	2–0	(Costa Rica) Cartaginés

Tegucigalpa
18 June 1989

Olimpia (Honduras)	2–1	(Costa Rica) Herediano

Tegucigalpa

=== Third round ===
Team 1	Agg.	Team 2	1st leg	2nd leg
Olimpia (Honduras)	1–6	(Mexico) UNAM	1–1	0–5
Herediano (Costa Rica)	3–2	(Mexico) UdeG	2–1	1–1

19 September 1989

Olimpia (Honduras)	1–1	(Mexico) UNAM

Estadio Nacional Chelato Uclés - Tegucigalpa, Honduras
3 October 1989

UNAM (Mexico)	5–0	(Honduras) Olimpia

Estadio Olímpico Universitario - Mexico City, Mexico

UNAM won 6–1 on aggregate; advanced to the fourth round.

12 October 1989

Herediano (Costa Rica)	2–1	(Mexico) UdeG

Estadio Eladio Rosabal Cordero - Heredia, Costa Rica
24 October 1989

UdeG (Mexico)	1–1	(Costa Rica) Herediano

Estadio Universitario San Jorgito - Colima, Mexico

Herediano won 3–2 on aggregate; advanced to the fourth round.

=== Fourth round ===
Team 1	Agg.	Team 2	1st leg	2nd leg
Herediano (Costa Rica)	2–6	(Mexico) UNAM	1–1	1–5

1 November 1989

Herediano (Costa Rica)	1–1	(Mexico) UNAM

Estadio Eladio Rosabal Cordero - Heredia, Costa Rica
28 November 1989

UNAM (Mexico)	5–1	(Costa Rica) Herediano

Estadio Olímpico Universitario - Mexico City, Mexico

UNAM won 6–2 on aggregate; advanced to the final.

== Caribbean Zone ==
=== First round ===
Team 1	Agg.	Team 2	1st leg	2nd leg
Aigle Rouge (Haiti)	1–1 (6–7 p)	(Guadeloupe) L'Étoile de Morne-à-l'Eau	1–0	0–1
Rivière-Pilote (Martinique)	2–2 (4–3 p)	(Haiti) Tempête	0–0	2–2
Solidarité-Scolaire (Guadeloupe)	2–4	(Martinique) Réveil Sportif	1–1	1–3

8 March 1989

Aigle Rouge (Haiti)	1–0	(Guadeloupe) L'Étoile de Morne-à-l'Eau

22 March 1989

L'Étoile de Morne-à-l'Eau (Guadeloupe)	1–0	(Haiti) Aigle Rouge
Penalties
	7–6

1–1 on aggregate. L'Étoile de Morne-à-l'Eau won 7–6 on penalties.

8 March 1989

Rivière-Pilote (Martinique)	0–0	(Haiti) Tempête

22 March 1989

Tempête (Haiti)	2–2	(Martinique) Rivière-Pilote
Penalties
	3–4

2–2 on aggregate. Rivière-Pilote won 4–3 on penalties.

8 March 1989

Solidarité-Scolaire (Guadeloupe)	1–1	(Martinique) Réveil Sportif

22 March 1989

Réveil Sportif (Martinique)	3–1	(Guadeloupe) Solidarité-Scolaire

Réveil Sportif won 4–2 on aggregate.

=== Second round ===
Team 1	Agg.	Team 2	1st leg	2nd leg
Rivière-Pilote (Martinique)	2–0	(Martinique) Réveil Sportif		

19 April 1989

Rivière-Pilote (Martinique)	2–0	(Martinique) Réveil Sportif

Rivière-Pilote advanced to the third round.

=== Third round ===
Team 1	Agg.	Team 2	1st leg	2nd leg
Rivière-Pilote (Martinique)	2–1	(Guadeloupe) L'Étoile de Morne-à-l'Eau		

31 May 1989

Rivière-Pilote (Martinique)	2–1	(Guadeloupe) L'Étoile de Morne-à-l'Eau

Rivière-Pilote advanced to the fourth round.

=== Group ===
Pos	Team	Pld	W	D	L	GF	GA	GD	Pts	Qualification	(Cuba) PIN	(Trinidad and Tobago) TRI	(Trinidad and Tobago) DEF	(Netherlands Antilles) JUV	(Netherlands Antilles) CJC
1	(Cuba) Pinar del Río	4	3	1	0	12	3	+9	7	Advance to fourth round	—	3–3	1–0	6–0	2–0
2	(Trinidad and Tobago) Trintoc	4	2	1	1	8	4	+4	5		3–3	—	0–1	4–0	1–0
3	(Trinidad and Tobago) Defence Force	4	2	1	1	3	1	+2	5		0–1	1–0	—	0–0	2–0
4	(Netherlands Antilles) SV Juventus	4	1	1	2	4	13	−9	3		0–6	0–4	0–0	—	4–3
5	(Netherlands Antilles) CRKSV Jong Colombia	4	0	0	4	3	9	−6	0		0–2	0–1	0–2	3–4	—

Source: RSSSF
12 July 1989

Pinar del Río (Cuba)	6–0	(Netherlands Antilles) SV Juventus
Osvaldo Alonso x 2 Raymundo Garcia x 2 TBD; TBD		Nil

Estadio Captán San Luis, Pinar del Río, Cuba
12 July 1989

Defence Force (Trinidad and Tobago)	2–0	(Netherlands Antilles) CRKSV Jong Colombia
TBD; TBD		Nil

Estadio Captán San Luis, Pinar del Río, Cuba

14 July 1989

Trintoc (Trinidad and Tobago)	1–0	(Netherlands Antilles) CRKSV Jong Colombia
TBD		Nil

14 July 1989

Pinar del Río (Cuba)	1–0	(Trinidad and Tobago) Defence Force
TBD		Nil

16 July 1989

Defence Force (Trinidad and Tobago)	0–0	(Netherlands Antilles) SV Juventus
Nil		Nil

16 July 1989

Pinar del Río (Cuba)	3–3	(Trinidad and Tobago) Trintoc
TBD; TBD; TBD		TBD; TBD; TBD

18 July 1989

Pinar del Río (Cuba)	2–0	(Netherlands Antilles) CRKSV Jong Colombia
TBD; TBD		Nil

18 July 1989

Trintoc (Trinidad and Tobago)	4–0	(Netherlands Antilles) SV Juventus
TBD X 2 TBD; TBD		Nil

20 July 1989

SV Juventus (Netherlands Antilles)	4–3	(Netherlands Antilles) CRKSV Jong Colombia
TBD X 2 TBD; TBD		TBD; TBD; TBD

20 July 1989

Defence Force (Trinidad and Tobago)	1–0	(Trinidad and Tobago) Trintoc
		Nil

=== Fourth round ===
Team 1	Agg.	Team 2	1st leg	2nd leg
Rivière-Pilote (Martinique)	2–3	(Cuba) Pinar del Río	1–1	1–2

9 November 1989

Rivière-Pilote (Martinique)	1–1	(Cuba) Pinar del Río

Havana
11 November 1989

Pinar del Río (Cuba)	2–1	(Martinique) Rivière-Pilote

Havana

Pinar del Río won 3–2 on aggregate.

== Final ==
=== Summary ===
Team 1	Agg.	Team 2	1st leg	2nd leg
Pinar del Río (Cuba)	2–4	(Mexico) UNAM	1–1	1–3

=== Matches ===
16 January 1990

Pinar del Río (Cuba)	1–1	(Mexico) UNAM
Medina 55'		Vera 69'

Estadio Pedro Marrero, Havana
6 February 1990

UNAM (Mexico)	3–1	(Cuba) Pinar del Río
Vera 8'; Campos 37'; Negrete 61' (pen.)		García 45' (pen.)

Estadio Olímpico Universitario, Mexico City

UNAM	Pinar del Río

UNAM won 4–2 on aggregate.
