= Ligue des Antilles =

Football cup tournament

Ligue des Antilles (or Antillean League) is a football cup tournament contested by teams from Guadeloupe, Martinique, French Guiana, and Saint-Martin.

== Format ==
The tournament in its modern form was started in 2004, solely between select teams from Guadeloupe and Martinique. The first round was competed as a group stage; two groups of four teams compete for the two spots in the final. In 2008, the rounds prior to the final were changed to knockout rounds, and in the year after were regionalized, ensuring a team from each both regions in the final.

Beginning in the 2018 edition, clubs from French Guiana began participating. The interregional portion of the competition expanded to four clubs; the three regions began rotating hosting rights, with the host getting two of the four spots. Additionally, a club from Saint-Martin was granted place in the tournament beginning in the 2021–22 edition, playing a play-in match with the host regions second qualifier, with the winner advancing to the semi-finals.

== Previous winners ==
=== Before 2004 ===
- 1947 : CS Moulien [Guadeloupe]
- 1954 : Arsenal [Guadeloupe]
- 1955 : CS Moulien [Guadeloupe]
- 1956 : Golden Star [Martinique]
- 1957 : CS Capesterrien [Guadeloupe]
- 1958 : Golden Star [Martinique]
- 1959 : Golden Star [Martinique]
- 1962 : CS Capesterrien [Guadeloupe]
- 1964 : CS Capesterrien [Guadeloupe]
- 1979 : Racing Club de Basse-Terre [Guadeloupe]
- 1997 : Club Franciscain [Martinique]

=== Since 2004 ===
Key
*	Match was won during extra time
†	Match was won on a penalty shoot-out

Year	Final		
	Champion	Result	Runner-Up
2004	(Martinique) Club Franciscain	2–2 (5–4)†	(Guadeloupe) AS Gosier
2005	(Martinique) Club Franciscain	1–0	(Martinique) RC Rivière-Pilote
2006	(Martinique) RC Rivière-Pilote	3–0	(Martinique) Club Franciscain
2007	(Martinique) Club Franciscain	3–0	(Martinique) RC Rivière-Pilote
2008	(Martinique) Club Franciscain	4–0	(Martinique) Samaritaine
2009	(Martinique) Samaritaine	2–2 (7–6)†	(Guadeloupe) CS Moulien
2010	(Martinique) Club Franciscain	3–1	(Guadeloupe) L'Etoile de Morne-à-l'Eau
2011	(Martinique) Aiglon du Lamentin	0–0 (5–4)†	(Guadeloupe) L'Etoile de Morne-à-l'Eau
2012	(Martinique) Club Colonial	2–1*	(Guadeloupe) Amical Club
2013	(Martinique) RC Rivière-Pilote	1–0*	(Guadeloupe) L'Etoile de Morne-à-l'Eau
2014	(Guadeloupe) CS Moulien	2–1	(Martinique) RC Rivière-Pilote
2015	(Martinique) RC Rivière-Pilote	2–0	(Guadeloupe) CS Moulien
2016	(Guadeloupe) CS Moulien	1–0	(Martinique) Club Franciscain
2017	(Martinique) Golden Lion FC	4–1	(Guadeloupe) US Baie-Mahault
2018	(Martinique) Golden Lion FC	6–1	(French Guiana) ASC Le Geldar
2019	(French Guiana) ASC Le Geldar	2–2 (5–4)†	(Martinique) Golden Lion FC
2020	(Martinique) Aiglon du Lamentin	1–0	(Guadeloupe) CS Moulien
2021	(Guadeloupe) CS Moulien	2–1*	(Martinique) Aiglon du Lamentin
2022	(Martinique) Club Franciscain	1–0*	(Guadeloupe) CS Moulien
2023	(Guadeloupe) La Gauloise	1–0	(French Guiana) ASC Karib
2024	(French Guiana) Etoile de Matoury	3–2	(Martinique) Club Franciscain
2025	(Martinique) Golden Lion FC	1–0	(Guadeloupe) AS Gosier

== Performances ==
=== By club ===
Performances in the Ligue des Antilles by club
Club	Title(s)	Runners-up	Seasons won	Seasons runner-up
(Martinique) Club Franciscain	6	3	2004, 2005, 2007, 2008, 2010, 2022–23	2005–06, 2016, 2024
(Guadeloupe) CS Moulien	3	4	2014, 2016, 2021–22	2009, 2015, 2020, 2022–23
(Martinique) RC Rivière-Pilote	3	3	2005–06, 2013, 2015	2005, 2007, 2014
(Martinique) Golden Lion FC	3	1	2017, 2018, 2025	2019
(Martinique) Aiglon du Lamentin	2	1	2011, 2020	2021–22
(French Guiana) ASC Le Geldar	1	1	2019	2018
(Martinique) Samaritaine	1	1	2009	2008
(Martinique) Club Colonial	1	0	2012	
(Guadeloupe) La Gauloise	1	0	2023	
(French Guiana) Etoile de Matoury	1	0	2024	
(Guadeloupe) L'Etoile de Morne-à-l'Eau	0	3		2010, 2011, 2013
(Guadeloupe) AS Gosier	0	2		2004, 2025
(Guadeloupe) Amical Club	0	1		2012
(French Guiana) ASC Karib	0	1		2023
(Guadeloupe) US Baie-Mahault	0	1		2017

=== By region ===
Performances in finals by region
Region	Titles	Runners-up	Total
Martinique	16	9	25
Guadeloupe	4	11	15
French Guiana	2	2	4
