= Richard Albert (football manager) =

Guadeloupean football manager (born 1963)

Personal information
- Date of birth: 15 October 1963 (age 63)
- Place of birth: Pointe-à-Pitre, Guadeloupe

Managerial career
- Years: Team
- 1999–2000: Al Wahda (youth)
- Solidarité-Scolaire
- Evolucas
- 2005–: CS Moulien

Richard Albert (born 15 October 1963) is a Guadeloupean football manager who manages CS Moulien.

== Life and career ==
Albert was born on 15 October 1963 in Pointe-à-Pitre, Guadeloupe. He grew up in Saint-François, Guadeloupe. He started playing football at the age of five. He played football in Guadeloupe. He studied electrical engineering and education. He has been a Christian. He has a daughter. He has worked as a science professor. He has worked in the education industry since 1989. He has also been involved in Guadeloupean politics. He studied coaching in France.

Albert started his managerial career in 1993. In 1999, he was appointed as a youth manager of Emirati side Al Wahda. After that, he was appointed manager of Guadeloupean side Solidarité-Scolaire. After that, he was appointed manager of Guadeloupean side Evolucas. In 2005, he was appointed manager of Guadeloupean side CS Moulien. He helped the club win the league. He also helped them win the Coupe de Guadeloupe. He has been regarded as the most prominent manager in Guadeloupe. He has been described as an "iconic football coach. Highly regarded in the world of football".
