= Mario Bocaly =

Martiniquais football coach

Personal information
- Date of birth: 28 July 1978 (age 48)
- Place of birth: Le Lamentin, Martinique

Managerial career
- Years: Team
- 2009–2010: Réveil Sportif
- 2010–2012: Aiglon du Lamentin
- 2012–2013: US Marinoise
- 2013–2016: Golden Star
- 2017–2021: Martinique

Mario Bocaly (born 28 July 1978) is a Martiniquais football coach. He managed the Martinique national team for four years, leading them at two CONCACAF Gold Cups, and has led four clubs in the Martinique Championnat National.

== Career ==
Bocaly managed Réveil Sportif for the 2009–10 Martinique Championnat National, although the club finished in 12th place and were relegated. After the relegation, he stayed in the Championnat National with Aiglon du Lamentin and managed the club in 2010–11 and 2011–12. During this time, in 2010, Bocaly additionally took on a position with the Martinique national team as an assistant coach.

After leaving Aiglon, Bocaly was hired as an assistant at US Marinoise, also in the Championnat National. On 19 October 2012, he was promoted to head coach and led the club for the remainder of the season, although they were relegated after a 12th-place finish. Bocaly again returned to the Martiniquais top flight and was hired by Golden Star ahead of the 2013–14 season. He spent three years at the club, tallying one fourth- and two fifth-place finishes in the league. After departing Golden Star, Bocaly was brought on as an assistant by Rivière-Pilote in 2016.

On 7 December 2017, Bocaly was appointed as the manager of the Martinique national team.

Bocaly stepped down as Martinique coach following the 2021 Gold Cup, telling the ViàATV show Tous à Bord that he had "finished [his] mission with the selection." He moved into an administrative role with the Ligue de football de la Martinique, serving as regional technical advisor with the mission of developing young players.
