= Ángel Bustos =

Chilean footballer (born 1961)

Personal information
- Full name: Juan Ángel Bustos Pizarro
- Date of birth: 16 January 1961 (age 65)
- Place of birth: Antofagasta, Chile
- Position: Winger

Youth career
- Antofagasta (city team)

Senior career*
Years	Team	Apps	(Gls)
1979–1984	Deportes Antofagasta		
1985	Unión La Calera		
1986	Huachipato		(16)
1987	Colo-Colo	3	(0)
1987–1990	Morelia		(32)
1990–1991	Cobreloa		
1992	Fernández Vial		
1993	Venados Yucatán		
1993–1994	UNAM	10	(0)
1994–1995	Deportes Ovalle		

Managerial career
- Deportes Antofagasta (youth)
- * Club domestic league appearances and goals

Juan Ángel Bustos Pizarro (born 16 January 1961), known as Ángel Bustos, is a Chilean former professional footballer who played as a winger for clubs in Chile and Mexico.

== Playing career ==
Born in Antofagasta, Chile, he represented the city team at national level and next he joined Deportes Antofagasta while he studied to get a degree in engineering. In Chile, he also played for Unión La Calera, Huachipato, Colo-Colo, Cobreloa, Fernández Vial and Deportes Ovalle, where he retired.

In Mexico he played for Morelia, Venados Yucatán and Pumas UNAM. He is a historical player of Morelia, where he played between 1987 and 1990 and scored 32 goals. As important facts, in his first season with the club he became the top goalscorer with 18 goals and also he scored the first goal in the Estadio Morelos versus América on 9 April 1989. In addition, he and his Chilean fellows Marco Antonio Figueroa and Juan Carlos Vera are remembered as a prolific attacking trident. For Pumas UNAM, he made 10 appearances in the 1993–94 season and didn't score.

== Personal life ==
Following his retirement, he worked as coach in the Deportes Antofagasta youth system for 14 years from U6 to U19 level. Next, he has worked in a family transport company.
