= Florian Narcissot =

Martiniquais footballer (born 1991)

Personal information
- Full name: Florian Ronald Narcissot
- Date of birth: May 20, 1991 (age 35)
- Position: Defender

Team information
- Current team: Club Franciscain

Senior career*
Years	Team	Apps	(Gls)
2014–	Club Franciscain	54+	(1+)

International career
2017	Martinique	1	(0)
- * Club domestic league appearances and goals as of 30 July 2018

Florian Narcissot (born 20 May 1991) is a professional footballer who plays as a defender for Club Franciscain in the Martinique Championnat National and internationally for Martinique.

He made his debut for Martinique in 2017, in a 2-1 defeat to Barbados on 27 March 2017. He was in the Martinique Gold Cup squad for the 2017 tournament.
