= 2015 Ligue Haïtienne season =

Ligue Haïtienne
- Season: 2015
- Champions: Ouverture: Don Bosco (4th title); Clôture: FICA (7th title)
- Relegated: Valencia; Police Nationale; Lajeune; Racine
- CFU Club Championship: TBD

The 2015 Ligue Haïtienne season was the 52nd season of top-tier football in Haiti. The league was split into two tournaments—the Série de Ouverture and the Série de Clôture—each with identical formats and each contested by the same 20 teams.

== Tables ==
=== Série de Clôture ===
 1.FICA (Cap-Haïtien)                     19  11  5  3  29-15  38  Qualified
 2.Violette AC (Port-au-Prince)           19  11  5  3  25-15  38  Qualified
 3.Baltimore SC (Saint-Marc)              19  11  3  5  20-10  36  Qualified
 4.Don Bosco SC (Pétion-Ville)            19   9  6  4  28-12  33  Qualified
 - - - - - - - - - - - - - - - - - - - - - - - - -- - - - - - - -
 5.Cavaly AS (Léogâne)                    19   8  8  3  19-10  32
 6.AS Capoise (Cap-Haïtien)               19   9  5  5  22-17  32
 7.Racing Club Haïtien (Port-au-Prince)   19   7  9  3  23-18  30
 8.Valencia (Léogâne)                     19   8  3  8  23-17  27
 9.Ouanaminthe FC                         19   8  1 10  18-23  25
10.América FC (Cayes)                     19   7  3  9  23-23  24
11.Aigle Noir AC (Port-au-Prince)         19   5  8  6  22-15  23
12.Roulado (La Gonâve)                    19   5  8  6  15-21  23
13.AS Mirebalais                          19   5  7  7  13-14  22
14.Police Nationale d'Haïti               19   5  7  7  13-19  22
15.Racine FC (Gros-Morne)                 19   6  4  9  12-29  22
16.Racing FC (Gonaïves)                   19   6  3 10  17-27  21
17.Inter (Grand-Goâve)                    19   4  7  8  11-13  19
18.Petit-Goâve FC                         19   5  4 10  11-22  19
19.Tempête FC (Saint-Marc)                19   4  6  9  12-24  18
20.US Lajeune (Pignon)                    19   3  4 12  11-23  13

=== Aggregate table ===
 1.Don Bosco SC (Pétion-Ville)            38  21  8  9  57-27  71        Super 8
 2.FICA (Cap-Haïtien)                     38  20 10  8  50-28  65  [-5]  Super 8
 3.Baltimore SC (Saint-Marc)              38  19  8 11  34-23  65        Super 8
 4.Racing Club Haïtien (Port-au-Prince)   38  17 16  5  47-28  62  [-5]  Super 8
 5.AS Capoise (Cap-Haïtien)               38  18 12  8  42-24  61  [-5]  Super 8
 6.Cavaly AS (Léogâne)                    38  16 12 10  45-26  60        Super 8
 7.América FC (Cayes)                     38  18  5 15  47-36  59        Super 8
 8.Violette AC (Port-au-Prince)           38  16 10 12  38-34  58        Super 8
- - - - - - - - - - - - - - - - - - - - - - - - -- - - - - - - -
 9.Aigle Noir AC (Port-au-Prince)         38  14 14 10  47-28  56
10.AS Mirebalais                          38  13 11 14  33-37  50
11.Inter (Grand-Goâve)                    38  12 11 15  28-34  47
12.Ouanaminthe FC                         38  15  2 21  39-49  47
13.Racing FC (Gonaïves)                   38  12 10 16  30-43  46
14.Petit-Goâve FC                         38  12  9 17  24-37  45
15.Tempête FC (Saint-Marc)                38  11 11 16  31-44  44
16.Roulado (La Gonâve)                    38   9 16 13  29-44  43
-----------------------------------------------------------------
17.Valencia (Léogâne)                     38  14  5 19  38-40  42  [-5]  Relegated
18.Police Nationale d'Haïti               38   8  9 21  27-48  33        Relegated
19.US Lajeune (Pignon)                    38   7 12 19  23-41  33        Relegated
20.Racine FC (Gros-Morne)                 38   7 11 20  21-59  32        Relegated
