= Marco Antonio Figueroa =

Chilean footballer (born 1962)

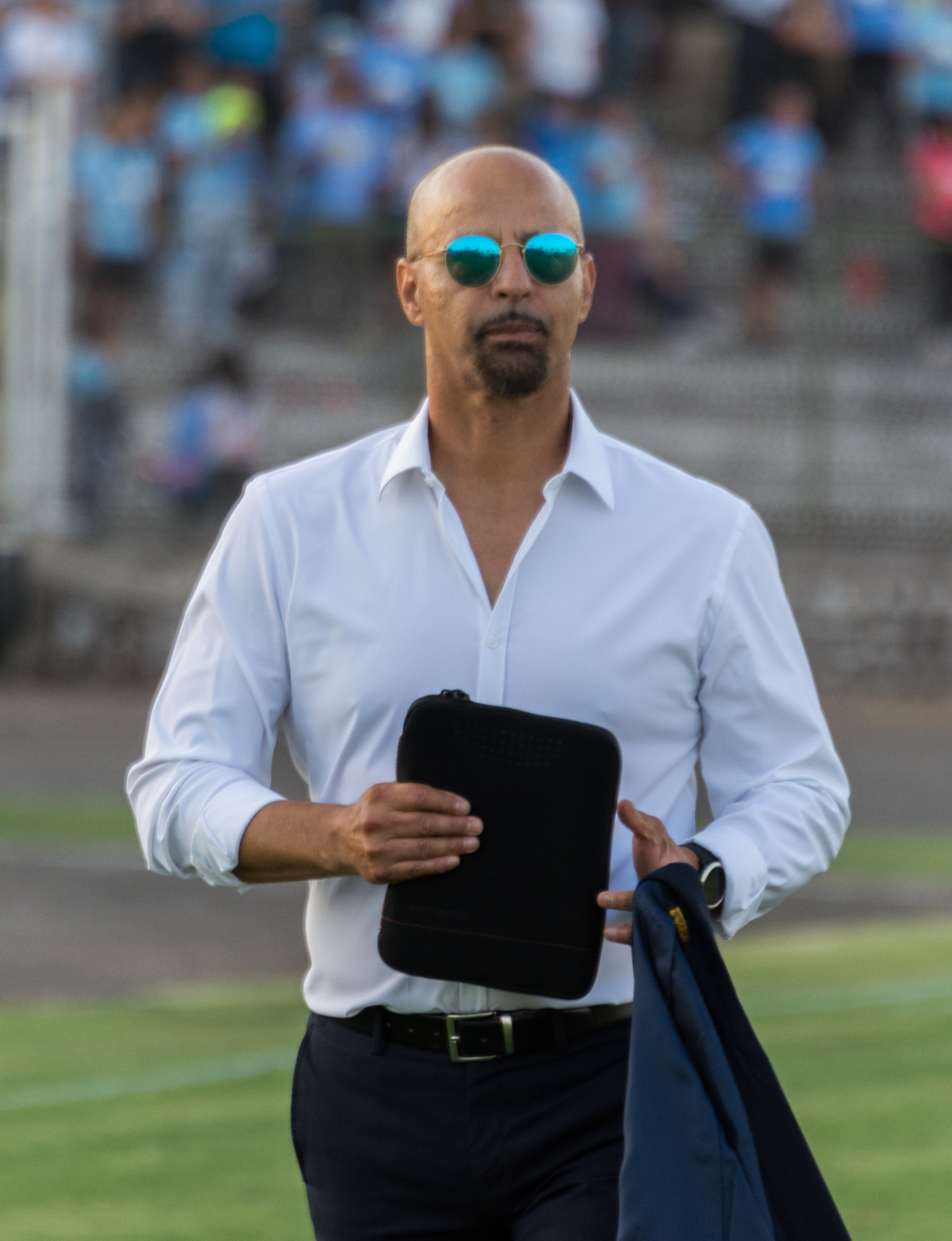
- Figueroa with O'Higgins in 2019

Personal information
- Full name: Marco Antonio Figueroa Montero
- Date of birth: 21 February 1962 (age 64)
- Place of birth: San Felipe, Chile
- Height: 1.80 m (5 ft 11 in)
- Position: Striker

Team information
- Current team: Real Estelí (manager)

Senior career*
Years	Team	Apps	(Gls)
1979–1983	Unión La Calera		
1983–1985	Everton (CHI)		
1986–1990	Atl.Morelia	133	(55)
1990–1991	Club América	15	(5)
1992–1993	Cobreloa		
1993–1997	Atl.Morelia	134	(75)
1997	Celaya	17	(3)
1998	Universidad Católica		

International career
1987–1993	Chile	7	(1)

Managerial career
- 2001: Comunicaciones
- 2002: La Piedad
- 2003: Jaguares de Tapachula
- 2004: Petroleros de Salamanca
- 2004–2005: Celaya
- 2005: Querétaro
- 2006: Lagartos de Tabasco
- 2006: Tecos
- 2006–2007: Monarcas Morelia
- 2008: Cobreloa
- 2009–2010: Universidad Católica
- 2010: O'Higgins
- 2011–2012: Everton (CHI)
- 2012: Unión San Felipe
- 2013: Cobreloa
- 2013–2014: Universidad de Chile
- 2015: Cobreloa
- 2015–2016: San Marcos
- 2017: Murciélagos
- 2018–2019: O'Higgins
- 2020: Cobreloa
- 2022–2025: Nicaragua
- 2026: Comunicaciones
- 2026–: Real Estelí
- * Club domestic league appearances and goals

Marco Antonio Figueroa Montero (Spanish pronunciation: [ˈmaɾko anˈtonjo fiɣeˈɾo.a]; born 21 February 1962) is a Chilean former footballer. He is commonly known as "El Fantasma" (Spanish word: "The phantom"). Figueroa played as a striker and spent the majority of his playing career in Mexico; he retired in 1998, aged 36, after playing at the Chilean powerhouse Universidad Católica. He is the current manager of Nicaraguan club Real Estelí.

== Club career ==
Figueroa played at Morelia over two spells between 1986 and 1997. He and his Chilean teammates Juan Carlos Vera and Ángel Bustos are remembered as an attacking trident.

== Coaching career ==
In January 2001, he debuted as head coach at the Guatemalan successful club Comunicaciones, signing the next season for Atlético Celaya of the Liga de Ascenso, where Figueroa had two spells, before going to Salamanca F.C. of the same country in the 2003 season. Three years later, after stints at Querétaro and UAG Tecos, he signed a contract with Monarcas Morelia, his old club as a player, where he was a prolific goalscorer during the 1980s and 90s.

Figueroa came back to his homeland in July 2008 signing for Cobreloa, another old club in his career, returning to his country after ten years out in Mexico and Guatemala. After a successful season at the team of Calama, reaching the Clausura Tournament semi–finals, in December of that year he reached an agreement with Universidad Católica for the next season. At Católica, Figueroa was runner–up in the 2009 Clausura Tournament, after reaching the semi–finals of the Apertura Tournament, being also named as the coach of the year according to El Gráfico. The next season, after a regular campaign with Católica in the first part of the league tournament and in the 2010 Copa Libertadores, he was fired from the club, signing months later for O'Higgins.

On 11 April 2011, Figueroa signed a contract with the Primera B side Everton, replacing Diego Osella, because of the bad results that the Argentine coach reached in the first weeks of the Apertura Tournament of that division. At the club based in Viña del Mar he was champion of the Clausura Tournament of that level, though not achieving promotion, because of losses against Unión San Felipe and Rangers. The next season, he was fired from the club.

On 25 September 2018, Figueroa was re-appointed as head coach of O'Higgins.

Figueroa led the Nicaragua national team for about four years until November 2025.

On 31 December 2025, Figueroa was appointed as manager of Guatemalan club Comunicaciones. In September 2026, he returned to Nicaragua to coach Real Estelí.

== Personal life ==
His son, Mateo, is a player from the Atlético Morelia youth system.

== Honours ==
=== Player ===
Cobreloa

- Primera División de Chile (1): 1992

==== Individual ====
- Primera División de Chile Top–scorer (1): 1993
- Monarcas Morelia all-time top scorer (130 goals)

=== Manager ===
Universidad Católica

- Torneo Clausura (1): Runner–up 2009

Everton

- Primera B (1): 2011 Apertura
- Promotion playoffs (1): Runner-up 2011

==== Individual ====
- ANFP Golden Ball (1): Best coach 2009
