= Outremer Champions Cup =

Annual association football competition

The Outremer Champions Cup was a football cup tournament held annually between 1997 and 2007 and contested by four teams from overseas departments and territories of France, including winners of the Coupe T.O.M., Coupe D.O.M., and Océan Indien Cup. Before 2004, it was called simply Coupe D.O.M.-T.O.M. (Outremer means "overseas".)

The tournament was always played in France. In 2008, it was decided to replace this competition with a similar one played by national teams called Coupe de l'Outre-Mer.

== Previous winners ==
Year	Final		
	Champion	Result	Runner-Up
1997	CS Saint-Denis (Réunion)	4–0	AS Manu Ura (French Polynesia)
1998	Club Franciscain (Martinique)	3–2	AS Vénus (French Polynesia)
1999	AS Vénus (French Polynesia)	2–2	SS Saint-Louisienne (Réunion)
2000	SS Saint-Louisienne (Réunion)	1–0	AS Vénus (French Polynesia)
2001	US Stade Tamponnaise (Réunion)	4–1	AS Vénus (French Polynesia)
2002	AS Pirae (French Polynesia)	1–0	Club Franciscain (Martinique)
2003	SS Saint-Louisienne (Réunion)	2–1	AS Vénus (French Polynesia)
2004	US Stade Tamponnaise (Réunion)	1–0	Club Franciscain (Martinique)
2005	ASC Le Geldar (French Guiana)	1–0	AS Sada (Mayotte)
2006	Club Franciscain (Martinique)	2–1	US Stade Tamponnaise (Réunion)
2007	US Stade Tamponnaise (Réunion)	3–0	L'Etoile de Morne-à-l'Eau (Guadeloupe)
