= 2015 Sint Maarten League =

SMSA Senior League
- Season: 2016–17
- CFU Club Championship: Flames United

The 2015 Sint Maarten Soccer Association (SMSA) Senior League was the 40th season of top division football in Sint Maarten. The title was won by Flames United.
