= Club Franciscain =

Association football club in Martinique

- Full name: Club Franciscain
- Founded: 1936
- Ground: Complexe Sportif de Trianon, Le François, Martinique
- Capacity: 5,000
- Chairman: Camille Paviot
- Manager: Patrick Cavelan
- League: Martinique Championnat National
- 2025–26: 2nd
Home colours	Away colours

Club Franciscain is a professional football club based in Le François, Martinique. The club plays in the Martinique Championnat National, and plays its home matches at Stade Complexe Sportif de Trianon.

== Honors ==
=== Domestic ===
- Martinique Championnat National (20): 1970–71, 1993–94, 1995–96, 1996–97, 1998–99, 1999–2000, 2000–01, 2001–02, 2002–03, 2003–04, 2004–05, 2005–06, 2006–07, 2008–09, 2012–13, 2013–14, 2016–17, 2017–18, 2018–19, 2023–24. (record)
- Coupe de la Martinique (20): 1954, 1969, 1986, 1987, 1990, 1998, 1999, 2001, 2002, 2003, 2004, 2005, 2007, 2008, 2012, 2018, 2020, 2022, 2024, 2025. (record)
- Trophée du Conseil Général (13): 1997, 1999, 2001, 2002, 2003, 2004, 2006, 2007, 2008, 2009, 2017, 2018, 2019. (record)
- Ligue des Antilles (5): 1997, 2004, 2005, 2007, 2008. (record)

=== International ===
==== Regional ====
- CONCACAF Caribbean Club Shield
  - Champions (1): 2018
  - Runners-up (1): 2019.

=== Friendly ===
- Coupe D.O.M (6): 1994, 1997, 2001, 2003, 2006, 2007. (record)
- Outremer Champions Cup (2): 1998, 2006.

== Performance in CONCACAF competitions ==
- CFU Club Championship: 2 appearances

1997 – First Round – Group 2 – 2nd place – 6 pts (stage 1 of 2)
2000 – First Round – withdrew from Group Phase (stage 1 of 2)

- Caribbean Club Shield- Winners: 2018
- CONCACAF Champions' Cup: 5 appearances

1987 – First Round (Caribbean) – Lost against (Trinidad and Tobago) Defence Force 4 – 2 on aggregate (stage 1 of ?)
1988 – Second Round (Caribbean) – Lost against (Trinidad and Tobago) Defence Force 4 – 2 (stage 2 of 4)
1993 – Semi-final (Caribbean) – Lost against (Martinique) Aiglon du Lamentin 3 – 1 on aggregate (stage 4 of 5)
1994 – Third Round (Caribbean) – Lost against (Netherlands Antilles) CRKSV Jong Colombia 3 – 2 on aggregate (stage 4 of 7)
1995 – First Round (Caribbean) – Lost against (Haiti) AS Capoise 1 – 0 on aggregate (stage 1 of 5)

== The club in the French football structure ==
- Coupe de France: 12 appearances, with any victories listed

1982–83: (rd 7) Club Franciscain 2–1 Montpellier LPSC
1992–93: (rd 8) Club Franciscain 2–1 FC Bourges
1994–95: (rd 7) Club Franciscain 2–1 ESA Brive
1996–97: (rd 7) Club Franciscain 2–2 Trélissac FC (aet, 4–3 pens)
1999-00:
2000–01:
2002–03: (rd 7) Club Franciscain 2– 1 Olympique Noisy-le-Sec
2003–04:
2005–06: (rd of 16) SCO Angers 5– 0 Club Franciscain
2009–10:
2014–15
2020–21: (round of 64) US Sinnamary 1–1 Club Franciscain (1–3 pens)

== Current squad ==
Note: Flags indicate national team as defined under FIFA eligibility rules; some limited exceptions apply. Players may hold more than one non-FIFA nationality.

No.	Pos.	Nation	Player
4	DF	MTQ	Sébastien Lepel
5	FW	MTQ	Patrick Percin
6	DF	MTQ	Jorick Éphestion
7	MF	MTQ	Yordan Thimon
8	MF	MTQ	Yann Thimon
9	MF	BRA	Isaias Alves
10	MF	MTQ	Christof Jougon
11	FW	MTQ	Djénhael Maingé
13	MF	GLP	Quentin Annette

No.	Pos.	Nation	Player
14	DF	MTQ	Ismael Bristol
15	FW	MTQ	Dylan Pingray
17	DF	MTQ	Yendi Tarrieu
18	GK	MTQ	Loïc Chauvet
20	MF	MTQ	Stéphane Abaul
21	FW	MTQ	Rudy Rapon
22	DF	MTQ	Florian Narcissot
24	FW	MTQ	William Marie-Magdeleine
26	GK	MTQ	Didier Sully
