= 2018–19 Martinique Championnat National =

Martinique Championnat National
- Season: 2018–19
- Caribbean Club Shield: Club Franciscain

The 2018–19 Martinique Championnat National is the 99th season of the Martinique Championnat National, the top division football competition in Martinique. The season began on 14 September 2018 then it ended.

== League table ==
Note: 4 points for a win, 2 points for a draw, 1 point for a defeat.

Pos	Team	Pld	W	D	L	GF	GA	GD	Pts	Qualification or relegation
1	Club Franciscain (C)	26	20	3	3	65	23	+42	89	Caribbean Club Shield
2	Golden Lion	26	19	5	2	71	16	+55	88	
3	Aiglon	26	19	2	5	56	26	+30	85	
4	Club Colonial	26	10	6	10	28	27	+1	62	
5	Samaritaine	26	10	6	10	26	30	−4	61 (Note: Samaritaine deducted 1 point.)	
6	Robert	26	9	7	10	33	31	+2	60	
7	Rapid Club	26	8	8	10	29	36	−7	58	
8	Essor-Préchotain	26	7	8	11	34	45	−11	55	
9	Rivière-Pilote	26	7	7	12	33	35	−2	54	
10	New Star	26	7	6	13	22	36	−14	53	
11	Saint-Joseph	26	6	10	10	29	45	−16	53 (Note: Saint-Joseph deducted 1 point.)	
12	Golden Star (R)	26	5	11	10	25	36	−11	52	Relegated to Promotion d'Honneur
13	Emulation (R)	26	6	5	15	24	54	−30	49	Relegated to Promotion d'Honneur
14	Assaut (R)	26	4	6	16	22	57	−35	44	Relegated to Promotion d'Honneur

Source: Soccerway
(C) Champions; (R) Relegated
