= Réveil Sportif =

Réveil-Sportif
- Full name: Réveil-Sportif
- Founded: 1938
- Ground: Stade Aristide Maugée, Gros-Morne, Martinique
- Chairman: Jean-Hugues Bellance
- Manager: Mario Bocaly
- League: Martinique Championnat National
- 2007/08: 4th
Home colours

Réveil-Sportif is a football club of Martinique, based in the eastern town Gros-Morne.

Founded in 1938 as Gros-Morne Club, they play in Martinique's first division, the Martinique Championnat National.
