= 2017–18 Martinique Championnat National =

Championnat National
- Season: 2017–18
- Champions: Club Franciscain
- Caribbean Club Shield: Club Franciscain

The 2017–18 Martinique Championnat National is the 98th season of the Championnat National, top division of football in Martinique. The season began on 1 September 2017 and ended on 2 June 2018.

== Standings ==
Note: 4 points for a win, 2 points for a draw, 1 point for a defeat.

Final table.

Pos	Team	Pld	W	D	L	GF	GA	GD	Pts	Relegation
1	Club Franciscain (Le François) (C)	26	18	5	3	54	20	+34	85	
2	Golden Lion FC (Saint-Joseph)	26	16	5	5	64	30	+34	79	
3	Club Colonial (Fort-de-France)	26	12	11	3	43	20	+23	73	
4	Samaritaine (Sainte-Marie)	26	12	9	5	36	26	+10	71	
5	Aiglon (Lamentin)	26	12	6	8	45	31	+14	68	
6	RC Rivière-Pilote	26	12	5	9	40	26	+14	67	
7	New Star (Ducos)	26	10	10	6	38	37	+1	65	
8	Emulation (Schoelcher)	26	7	6	13	24	31	−7	53	
9	Golden Star (Fort-de-France)	26	6	9	11	23	37	−14	53	
10	Essor-Préchotain (Prêcheur)	26	5	12	9	24	39	−15	53	
11	RC Saint-Joseph	26	6	8	12	22	37	−15	52	
12	Good Luck (Fort-de-France) (R)	26	5	7	14	28	44	−16	48	Relegated
13	JS Eucalyptus (Eucalypte) (R)	26	6	2	18	25	53	−28	46	Relegated
14	CS Case-Pilote (R)	26	4	7	15	23	58	−35	45	Relegated

Source: French Antilles 2017/18, RSSSF.com
Rules for classification: 1) points; 2) goal difference; 3) number of goals scored.
(C) Champions; (R) Relegated
