= Coupe D.O.M. =

Coupe D.O.M. was a cup played by clubs from French Guiana, Guadeloupe, Martinique, Mayotte and Réunion.

D.O.M. stands for Départements d'Outre-Mer, which includes French Guiana, Guadeloupe, Martinique, Réunion and Mayotte. The other D.O.M., Saint Pierre and Miquelon, did not enter as the standard of their football was too low.

In 2004 the competition was reorganised as the Éliminatoires Antilles-Guyane. Since then, teams from French Guiana, Guadeloupe, Martinique played in a league format, with the top two teams qualifying for the Outremer Champions Cup. The champions of Réunion do not enter Éliminatoires Antilles-Guyane anymore, but play off with the Mayotte champions for the right to enter the Outremer Champions Cup.

The tournament is likely to be reorganised in future years following a June 2007 announcement by the French Football Federation.

== Previous winners ==
Year	Final		
	Champion	Result	Runner-Up
1989	SS Saint-Louisienne (Réunion)	3–3 (4–2 pens)	Zénith Morne-à-l'Eau (Guadeloupe)
1990	JS Saint-Pierroise (Réunion)	2–0	SC Kouroucien (French Guiana)
1991	JS Saint-Pierroise (Réunion)	1–0	Solidarité Scolaire (Guadeloupe)
1992	L'Etoile de Morne-à-l'Eau (Guadeloupe)	1–0	Aiglon du Lamentin (Martinique)
1993	US Sinnamary (French Guiana)	2–1	US Robert (Martinique)
1994	Club Franciscain (Martinique)	2–1	US Sinnamary (French Guiana)
1995	JS Saint-Pierroise (Réunion)		Arsenal Guadeloupe (Guadeloupe)
1996	CS Saint-Denis (Réunion)	1–0	Club Franciscain (Martinique)
1997	Club Franciscain (Martinique)	8–3	CS Saint-Denis (Réunion)
1998	SS Saint-Louisienne (Réunion)	2–0	L'Etoile de Morne-à-l'Eau (Guadeloupe)
1999	SS Saint-Louisienne (Réunion)	2–1	Racing Club de Basse-Terre (Guadeloupe)
2000	US Stade Tamponnaise (Réunion)	4–0	Club Franciscain (Martinique)
2001	Club Franciscain (Martinique)	2–1	L'Etoile de Morne-à-l'Eau (Guadeloupe)
2002	SS Saint-Louisienne (Réunion)	2–0	Club Franciscain (Martinique)
2003	Club Franciscain (Martinique)	3–1	Phare du Canal (Guadeloupe)

=== Éliminatoires Antilles-Guyane ===
Year	Champion	Runner-up
2004	Racing Club de Basse-Terre (Guadeloupe)	Club Franciscain (Martinique)
2005	ASC Le Geldar (French Guiana)	Club Franciscain (Martinique)
2006	Club Franciscain (Martinique)	US Matoury (French Guiana)
2007	Club Franciscain (Martinique)	L'Etoile de Morne-à-l'Eau (Guadeloupe)
