= Juan Carlos Vera =

Chilean footballer (born 1960)

Personal information
- Full name: Juan Carlos Vera Rivera
- Date of birth: 5 July 1960 (age 66)
- Place of birth: La Calera, Chile
- Position: Attacking midfielder

Youth career
- Rayo Vallecano
- Unión La Calera

Senior career*
Years	Team	Apps	(Gls)
1979–1984	Unión La Calera		
1985	Audax Italiano	29	(5)
1986	Huachipato		(12)
1986–1987	Cruz Azul	8	(0)
1987–1988	Morelia	29	(4)
1988–1990	Tampico Madero	8	(1)
1990–1993	UNAM	71	(11)
1991–1992	→ Atlas	31	(3)
1993–1994	Pachuca		
1994–1995	DFW Toros		
1995	Unión La Calera		(1)

International career
1991	Chile	1	(0)
- * Club domestic league appearances and goals

Juan Carlos Vera Rivera (born 5 July 1960) is a Chilean former professional footballer who played as an attacking midfielder for clubs in Chile, Mexico and the United States.

== Club career ==
Born in La Calera, Chile, in 1975 Vera moved to Spain and joined Rayo Vallecano youth system at the age of 15. He returned to Chile and played for Unión La Calera, where he made his professional debut, Audax Italiano and Huachipato.

In 1986 he moved to Mexico. He came to Morelia thanks of his former fellow in Unión La Calera, Marco Antonio Figueroa. In Morelia, he and his Chilean fellows Marco Antonio Figueroa and Ángel Bustos are well remembered as a prolific attacking trident. Along with Pumas UNAM, he won the 1990–91 Primera División, which is remembered as El Tucazo. In Mexico, he also played for Cruz Azul, Tampico Madero, Atlas and Pachuca.

After a step in the United States with DFW Toros, his last club was Unión La Calera in 1995, scoring one goal.

== International career ==
Vera made an appearance for the Chile national team in a friendly match versus Mexico on 9 April 1991.

== Personal life ==
After the 1973 Chilean coup d'état, he went alone to Spain in 1975. His family was made up by his father, a railway worker, his mother, a housekeeper, and his five siblings. All of them stayed in Chile.

When he was a player of Unión La Calera, he was nicknamed Pelé.

His first son was born in Mexico when he was a player of Morelia.

Following his retirement, he started a women's clothing factory along with his wife and they also have a guesthouse in Santiago, Chile, called The Fox Hostel. In addition, he has worked in football scouting, linking Chilean players with Mexican clubs.

== Honours ==
Unión La Calera

- Segunda División de Chile: 1984

UNAM

- Primera División de México: 1990–91
