= Unité Sainte-Rosienne =

Association football club in Guadeloupe

USR Sainte-Rose
- Full name: Unité Sainte-Rosienne
- Ground: Stade René Serge Nabajoth
- Capacity: 7,500

Unité Sainte-Rosienne is a football club in Guadeloupe, based in the town of Sainte-Rose.

== Achievements ==
- Guadeloupe Championnat National: 2

2015–16, 2016–17.

- Coupe de Guadeloupe: 1

2012.

== Performance in CFU competitions ==
- CFU Club Championship: 1 appearance

2014 – First round
