= Racing Club de Basse-Terre =

Racing Club
- Full name: Association Sportive Racing Club de Basse-Terre
- Ground: Stade Rivière des Pères, Basse-Terre, Guadeloupe
- Chairman: Thierry Saint Clement
- Manager: Jacques Hatchi; Sylvio Budon
- League: Promotion d'Honneur Régionale
- 2008/09: 12th (Guadeloupe Division d’Honneur)
Home colours

Racing Club de Basse-Terre is a football club in Guadeloupe, based in Basse-Terre.

They play in Guadeloupe's second division, the Promotion d'Honneur Regionale.

== Achievements ==
- Guadeloupe Championnat National: 3

1967–68, 1998–99, 2003–04

- Coupe de Guadeloupe: 8

1941–42, 1951, 1952, 1959, 1991, 2001, 2004, 2009

- Coupe D.O.M.: 1

2004

- Ligue des Antilles: 1

1979
