= CS Moulien =

Football club in Guadeloupe

- Full name: Club Sportif Moulien
- Founded: 1931
- Ground: Stade Jacques Pontrémy, Le Moule, Guadeloupe
- Capacity: 2,500
- Chairman: Roger Sabas
- Manager: Richard Albert
- League: Guadeloupe Championnat National
- 2024–2025: Champions

CS Moulien is a professional football club in Guadeloupe, based in the town of Le Moule. They play in Guadeloupe's first division, the Guadeloupe Championnat National. CS Moulien usually play their home games in front of dozens of spectators at the 2,500-capacity Stade Jacques Pontrémy.

== Achievements ==
- Guadeloupe Division of Honour: 21

1944–45, 1946–47, 1947–48, 1948–49, 1950–51, 1952–53, 1954–55, 1955–56, 1964–65, 1983–84, 1984–85, 1993–94, 2008–09, 2010–11, 2012–13, 2013–14, 2014-15, 2017–18, 2022–23, 2023–24, 2024–25

- Coupe de Guadeloupe: 10

1948, 1954, 1972, 1974, 2008, 2010, 2013, 2014, 2017, 2020

- Ligue des Antilles: 2

1947, 1955

== Performance in CONCACAF competitions ==
- CONCACAF Champions Cup: 3 appearances

1985 – Third round (Caribbean Zone) – Lost against (Trinidad and Tobago) Defence Force
1986 – Second round (Caribbean Zone) – Lost against (Trinidad and Tobago) Trintoc
1995 – Final Tournament – 4th and last in the group
