= Coupe de Guadeloupe =

Football tournament in Guadeloupe

The Coupe de Guadeloupe is the top knockout tournament of Guadeloupean football.

== Finals ==
The list of cup finals:

- 1941–42: Racing Club 4–2 Redoutable
- 1943: not finished
- 1944–45: not played
- 1946: La Gauloise 1–0 Moulien
- 1947: Cygne Noir 3–2 Red Star
- 1948: Moulien 2–0 Cygne Noir
- 1949: not played
- 1949–50: Red Star 2–1 Moulien
- 1951: Racing Club 3–2 La Gauloise
- 1952: Racing Club 2–1 La Gauloise
- 1953: not played
- 1954: Moulien 3–2 Juventus SA
- 1955: Juventus SA 3–2 Cygne Noir
- 1956: Red Star 2–1 Moulien
- 1957: CS Capesterre 2–1 Moulien
- 1958: Juventus SA 2–1 Red Star
- 1959: Racing Club 2–1 Red Star
- 1959–60: Red Star 3–2 Juventus SA
- 1961: Redoutable 3–2 Juventa
- 1962: CS Capesterre 3–2 Juventus SA
- 1963: Solidarité Scolaire 4–2 Moulien
- 1964: Juventa 2–1 CS Capesterre
- 1965–67: not held
- 1968: Juventa 1–0 Cygne Noir
- 1969: Juventa and La Gauloise (abandoned at 1–0)
- 1969–70: S.Port-Louis 3–0 L'Etoile de Morne-à-l'Eau
- 1970–71: Juventus SA 2–1 Red Star
- 1972: Moulien 2–1 Equinoxe
- 1973: Solidarité Scolaire awd La Gauloise (not played)
- 1974: Moulien 2–1 Racing Club
- 1975: Juventus SA 3–0 La Gauloise
- 1976: Juventus SA 3–2 L'Etoile de Morne-à-l'Eau
- 1977: L'Etoile de Morne-à-l'Eau 3–1 Racing Club
- 1978: Juventus SA 3–1 L'Etoile de Morne-à-l'Eau
- 1979: L'Etoile de Morne-à-l'Eau 5–1 Stade Lamentinois
- 1979–80: JSC Mgte 1–0 Moulien
- 1981: Jeunesse (T.R.): 5–2 CS Capesterre
- 1982: CS Capesterre 5–0 Siroco
- 1983: Cygne Noir 1–1 L'Etoile de Morne-à-l'Eau (aet, 4–2 pens)
- 1984: L'Etoile de Morne-à-l'Eau 1–0 Cygne Noir
- 1985: L'Etoile de Morne-à-l'Eau 2–0 S.Port-Louis
- 1986: Solidarité Scolaire 1–0 Sporting
- 1987: Siroco 1–0 L'Etoile de Morne-à-l'Eau
- 1988: US Baie-Mahault
- 1989: Zénith
- 1991: Racing Club
- 1992: Solidarité Scolaire
- 1993: Solidarité Scolaire
- 1994: Arsenal
- 1999: AJCS Terre-de-Haut 1–0 Juventus SA
- 2000: AS Gosier 3–3 Juventus SA (aet, 4–1 pens)
- 2001: Racing Club 2–2 Jeunesse (T.R.) (aet, 4–3 pens)
- 2002: L'Etoile de Morne-à-l'Eau 2–1 Solidarité Scolaire
- 2003:
- 2004: Racing Club 3–1 AS Gosier
- 2005: Rapid Club 3–1 Fumerolles
- 2006: Amical Club 3–2 Solidarité Scolaire (aet)
- 2007: La Gauloise 2–0 AS Dragon (Gosier)
- 2008: Moulien 1–0 US Baie-Mahault
- 2009: Racing Club 1–0 Amical Club (aet)
- 2010: Moulien 2–0 JS Vieux-Habitants
- 2011: Red Star 1–0 Racing Club
- 2012: USR 1–0 JS Vieux-Habitants
- 2013: Moulien 2–0 Solidarité Scolaire
- 2014: Moulien 3–2 L'Etoile de Morne-à-l'Eau
- 2015: L'Etoile de Morne-à-l'Eau 2–0 Cactus
- 2016: USC de Bananier 1–1 USR (aet, 5–4 pens)
- 2017: Moulien 1–0 US Baie-Mahault
- 2018: L'Etoile de Morne-à-l'Eau 1–0 Phare du Canal
- 2019: US Baie-Mahault 4–1 CS Saint-François
- 2020: Moulien 2–1 Phare du Canal
- 2021: Amical Club 1–1 Phare du Canal (4–2 pens)
- 2022–23: Not held
- 2024: AS Gosier 3–2 US Baie-Mahault
