= US Baie-Mahault =

- Full name: Union Sportive Baie-Mahaultienne
- Ground: Stade Fiesque Duchesne, Baie-Mahault, Guadeloupe
- Chairman: Anatole Mimiette
- Manager: Eddy Gueppois
- League: Promotion d'Honneur Régionale

US Baie-Mahault is a professional football club in Guadeloupe, based in the town of Baie-Mahault.

They play in Guadeloupe's second division, the Promotion d'Honneur Régionale.

== Achievements ==
- Coupe de Guadeloupe: 1

1988
