= L'Étoile de Morne-à-l'Eau =

Étoile
- Full name: L'Étoile de Morne-à-l'Eau
- Founded: 1958
- Ground: Stade Pierre Monnerville, Morne-à-l'Eau, Guadeloupe
- Chairman: Claude Rimbon
- League: Guadeloupe Championnat National

L'Étoile de Morne-à-l'Eau is a professional football club of Guadeloupe, based in the city of Morne-à-l'Eau. They play in the Guadeloupe's first division, the Guadeloupe Championnat National.

== Achievements ==
- Guadeloupe Championnat National: 9

1979–80, 1980–81, 1981–82, 1995–96, 1996–97, 1997–98, 2000–01, 2001–02, 2006–07

- Coupe de Guadeloupe: 5

1977, 1979, 1984, 1985, 2002, 2015, 2018

- Coupe D.O.M.: 1

1992

== Performance in CONCACAF competitions ==
- CFU Club Championship: 2 appearances

1997 – First Round – Group 1 – 3rd place – 2 pts (stage 1 of 2)
1998 – First Round – Lost against (Jamaica) Waterhouse F.C. 3–0 (stage 1 of 3)

- CONCACAF Champions Cup: 5 appearances

1987 – Won to rounds at least
1989 – Play-off (Caribbean Zone) – Lost against (Martinique) RC Rivière-Pilote 2–0 (stage 3 of 5)
1989 – Third Round (Caribbean Zone) – Lost against (Martinique) Olympique du Marin 8–0 (stage 3 of 7)
1992 – Third Round (Caribbean) – Lost against (Suriname) S.V. Robinhood 4–3 (stage 4 of 6)
1993 – Second Round (Caribbean) – Lost against (Martinique) Aiglon du Lamentin 3–0 (stage 2 of 5)

== The club in the French football structure ==
- French Cup: 12 appearances

1977–78, 1982–83, 1984–85, 1988–89, 1992–93, 1994–95, 1996–97, 2000–01, 2003–04, 2012–13, 2015–16, 2017–18

Ties won
Year	Round	Home team (tier)	Score	Away team (tier)
2000–01	Round 7	AS Muret (4)	0–2	Etoile
2003–04	Round 7	Etoile	2–2 (a.e.t.) (4–2 p)	US Romorantin (3)
