= Ligue de football de la Martinique =

Association football league

CONCACAF
- Founded: 1953
- Headquarters: Fort-de-France
- FIFA affiliation: N/A
- CONCACAF affiliation: 1978 (founding member of Caribbean Football Union); 2013 (full member)
- President: Samuel Péreau
- Website: http://liguefoot-martinique.fff.fr

The Ligue de football de la Martinique is the governing body of football in Martinique. It is associated with the French Football Federation, affiliated with CONCACAF since 1978 (as an associate member) and full member since 2013.

== See also ==
- Martinique Championnat National
- Martinique national football team
