= Hôtel de Ville, Les Abymes =

Town hall in Les Abymes, Guadeloupe, France

Hôtel de Ville
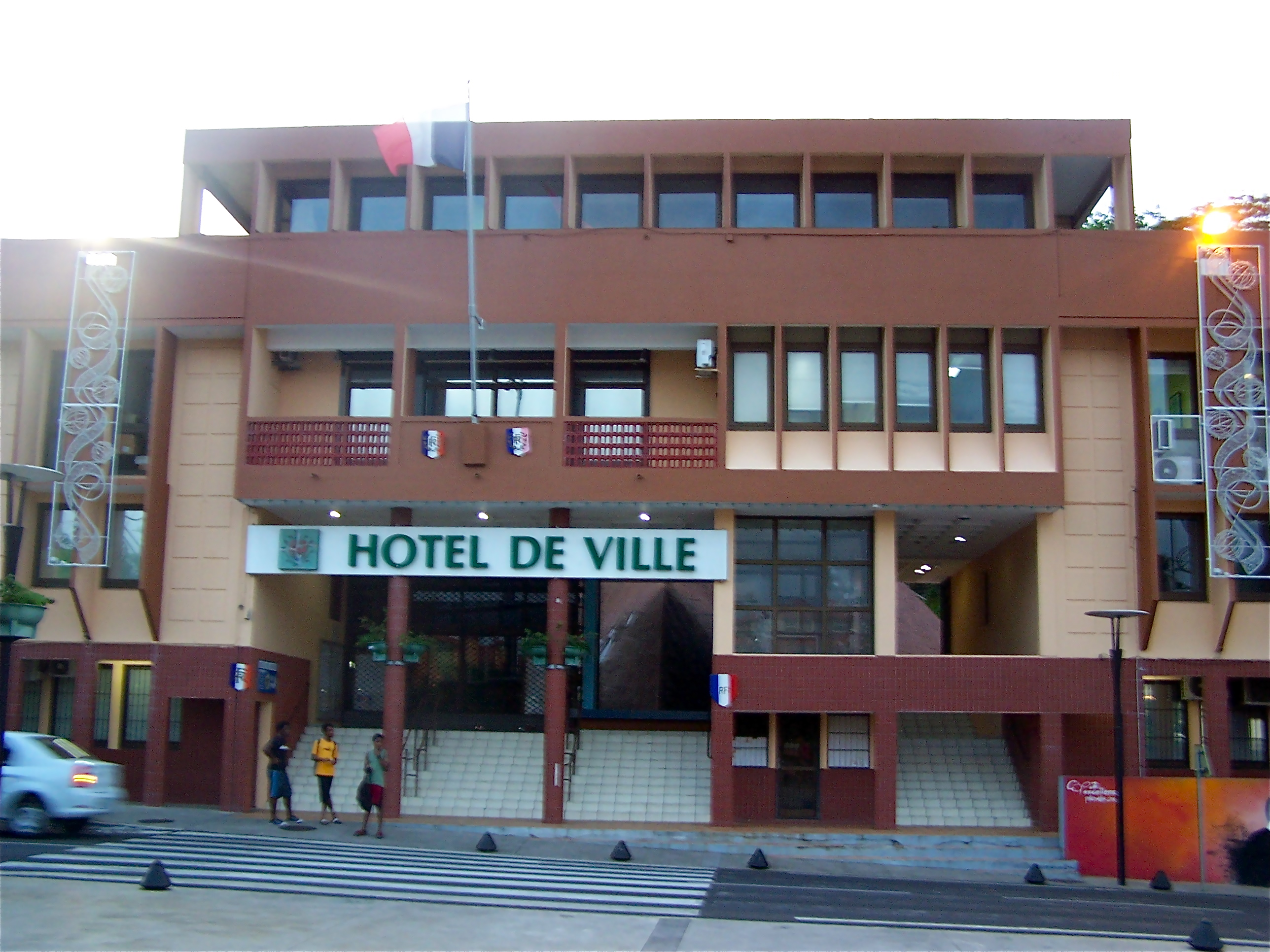
- The main frontage of the Hôtel de Ville in May 2013
- Interactive map of the Hôtel de Ville area

General information
- Type: City hall
- Architectural style: Modern style
- Location: Les Abymes, Guadeloupe
- Coordinates: 16.2710°N 61.5053°W
- Completed: 1986

The Hôtel de Ville (French pronunciation: [otɛl də vil], City Hall) is a municipal building in Les Abymes, Guadeloupe in the Caribbean Sea, standing on Rue Achille René-Boisneuf.

== History ==
Following significant population growth largely associated with the local Darboussier sugar factory, which was established in 1869, local officials decided to commission a town hall in Les Abymes. The site they selected was on the east side of what is now Rue Achille René-Boisneuf, adjacent to the Church of the Immaculate Conception. The first town hall was designed as a simple two-storey structure, built in timber and completed in the late 19th century. The design involved a symmetrical main frontage of seven bays. On both floors, there were verandas formed by eight iron poles supporting a ceiling above.

On 12 September 1928, a severe hurricane devastated Guadeloupe, severely damaging buildings and leading to 1,200 deaths. In the aftermath of the hurricane, the Governor of Guadeloupe, Théophile Antoine Pascal Tellier, asked the French architect, Ali Tur, to prepare designs for the reconstruction of many of the public buildings on the island. The new town hall was designed in the Art Deco style, built in concrete and was completed in 1934. The design involved a symmetrical main frontage of five bays facing onto what is now Rue Achille René-Boisneuf. The central section of three bays was recessed and featured a square headed doorway in the centre bay and a veranda, formed by two iron poles supporting a ceiling, on the first floor. The old town hall later became the Centre Communal d'Action Sociale (Social Action Community Centre).

A war memorial, in the form of an obelisk intended to commemorate the lives of local people who died in the First World War, was designed by the sculptor, Ardaches Baldjian, and unveiled by the Governor of Guadeloupe, Félix Éboué, in front of the town hall on 26 December 1937.

In the early 1980s, following significant population growth in the previous three decades, the town council led by the mayor, Frédéric Jalton, decided to commission a more substantial town hall. The site they selected was on the west side of Rue Achille René-Boisneuf. The new building was designed in the modern style, built in concrete and was completed in 1986. The design involved an asymmetrical main frontage in three sections facing onto Rue Achille René-Boisneuf. The central section of five bays featured a short flight of steps leading up to a three-bay entrance on the left. Above the entrance there was a three-bay balcony, with three recessed windows behind and six recessed casement windows to the right. At attic level there were ten more recessed casement windows. The wings, which did not involve an attic level, featured a series of portraits by the artist, Al Pacman, depicting famous local authors, composers and performers, on the facade of the building. The president of France, François Mitterrand, visited the town hall, while it was still under construction, in December 1985.
