= Petit-Bourg =

- Commune
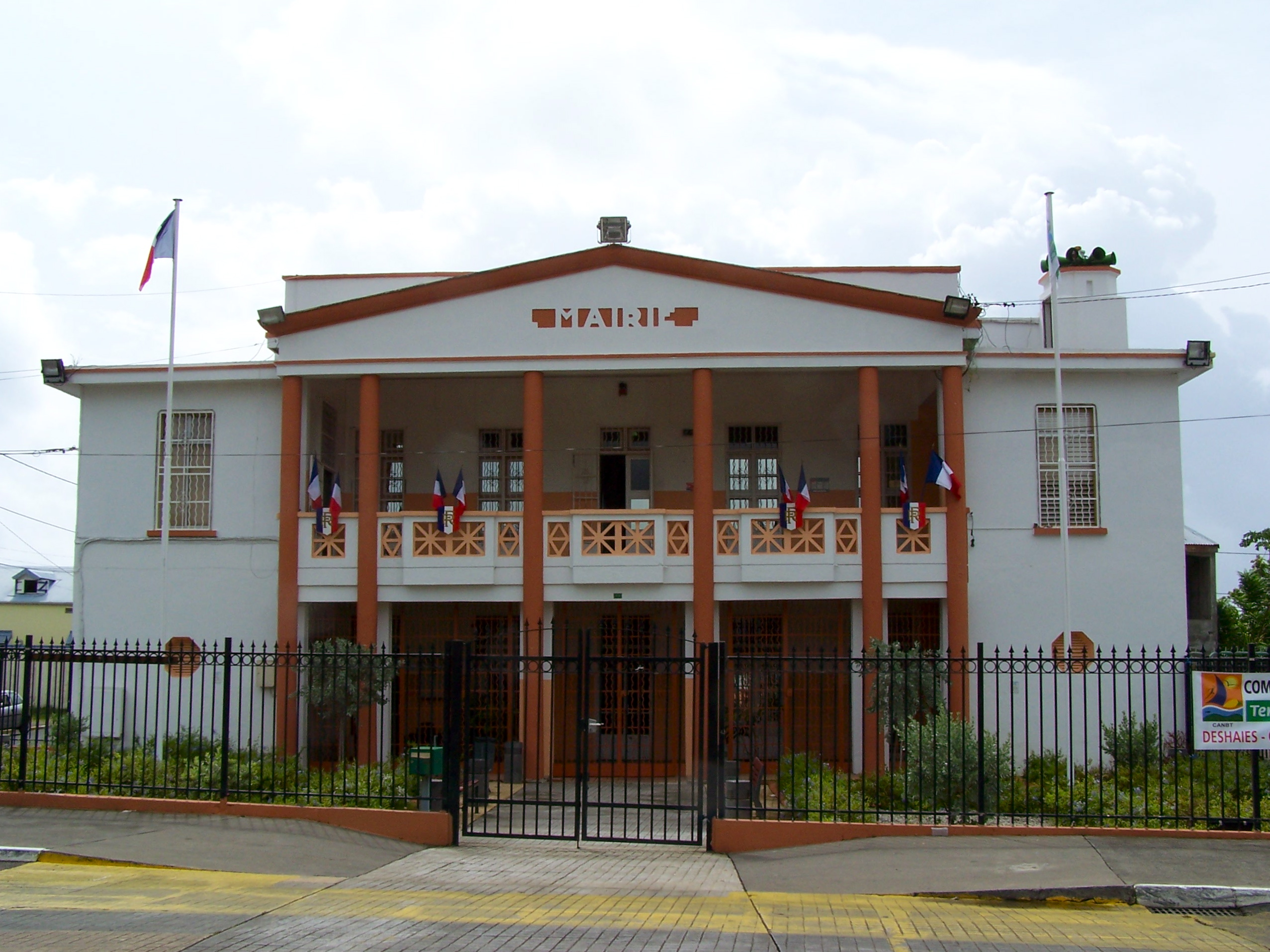
- The Hôtel de Ville, designed by architect Ali Tur

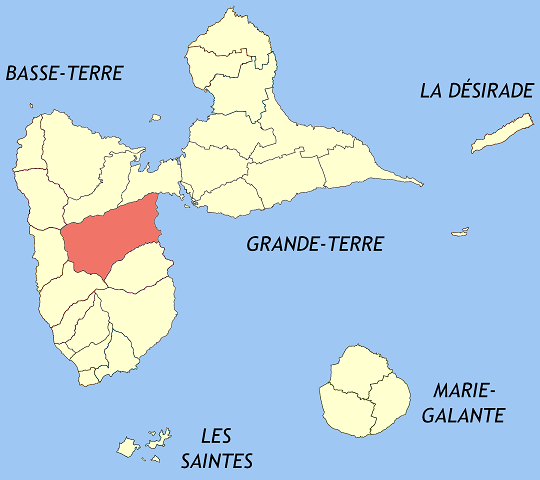
- Location of the commune (in red) within Guadeloupe
- Location of Petit-Bourg
- Coordinates: 16°11′35″N 61°35′30″W
- Country: France
- Overseas region and department: Guadeloupe
- Arrondissement: Basse-Terre
- Canton: Petit-Bourg and Baie-Mahault-2
- Intercommunality: CA Nord Basse-Terre

Government
  - Mayor (2021–2026): David Nebor
- Area^{1}: 129.88 km^{2} (50.15 sq mi)
- Population (2023): 24,665
  - Density: 189.91/km^{2} (491.85/sq mi)
- Time zone: UTC−04:00 (AST)
- INSEE/Postal code: 97118 /97170
- Website: ville-petitbourg.fr
- ^{1} French Land Register data, which excludes lakes, ponds, glaciers > 1 km^{2} (0.386 sq mi or 247 acres) and river estuaries.

Petit-Bourg (French pronunciation: [pəti buʁ]; Guadeloupean Creole: Tibou, Ti Bou) is the seventh-largest commune in the French overseas department of Guadeloupe. It is located on the east side of the island of Basse-Terre, and is part of the metropolitan area of Pointe-à-Pitre, the largest metropolitan area in Guadeloupe.

It has many tourist attractions: the Cascade aux écrevisses (waterfall), the National Park of Guadeloupe, the Saut de la Lézarde (waterfall), as well as the Kassaverie (cassava/manioc factory) located downtown.

== History ==
The Hôtel de Ville was completed in around 1932.

== Geography ==
=== Climate ===
Petit-Bourg has a tropical rainforest climate (Köppen climate classification Af). The average annual temperature in Petit-Bourg is 25.3 °C (77.5 °F). The average annual rainfall is 2,732.3 mm (107.57 in) with October as the wettest month. The temperatures are highest on average in August, at around 26.7 °C (80.1 °F), and lowest in February, at around 23.5 °C (74.3 °F). The highest temperature ever recorded in Petit-Bourg was 33.9 °C (93.0 °F) on 23 September 2005; the coldest temperature ever recorded was 14.2 °C (57.6 °F) on 13 April 2001.

Climate data for Petit-Bourg (1981–2010 averages, extremes 1970−present)
Month	Jan	Feb	Mar	Apr	May	Jun	Jul	Aug	Sep	Oct	Nov	Dec	Year
Record high °C (°F)	30.5 (86.9)	32.5 (90.5)	33.6 (92.5)	32.3 (90.1)	33.6 (92.5)	33.0 (91.4)	32.9 (91.2)	33.7 (92.7)	33.9 (93.0)	33.0 (91.4)	32.9 (91.2)	33.1 (91.6)	33.9 (93.0)
Mean daily maximum °C (°F)	27.7 (81.9)	27.6 (81.7)	28.1 (82.6)	28.8 (83.8)	29.4 (84.9)	29.7 (85.5)	29.9 (85.8)	30.5 (86.9)	30.5 (86.9)	30.2 (86.4)	29.4 (84.9)	28.4 (83.1)	29.2 (84.6)
Daily mean °C (°F)	23.8 (74.8)	23.5 (74.3)	23.9 (75.0)	24.8 (76.6)	25.7 (78.3)	26.4 (79.5)	26.5 (79.7)	26.7 (80.1)	26.6 (79.9)	26.2 (79.2)	25.4 (77.7)	24.4 (75.9)	25.3 (77.5)
Mean daily minimum °C (°F)	19.8 (67.6)	19.5 (67.1)	19.7 (67.5)	20.8 (69.4)	22.0 (71.6)	23.0 (73.4)	23.1 (73.6)	22.9 (73.2)	22.6 (72.7)	22.2 (72.0)	21.4 (70.5)	20.4 (68.7)	21.5 (70.7)
Record low °C (°F)	15.7 (60.3)	15.4 (59.7)	15.9 (60.6)	14.2 (57.6)	16.3 (61.3)	19.5 (67.1)	19.3 (66.7)	19.0 (66.2)	19.5 (67.1)	19.0 (66.2)	17.0 (62.6)	15.8 (60.4)	14.2 (57.6)
Average precipitation mm (inches)	150.2 (5.91)	112.8 (4.44)	129.0 (5.08)	186.3 (7.33)	287.9 (11.33)	219.2 (8.63)	226.9 (8.93)	243.1 (9.57)	316.2 (12.45)	332.2 (13.08)	318.4 (12.54)	210.1 (8.27)	2,732.3 (107.57)
Average precipitation days (≥ 1.0 mm)	18.1	14.9	15.4	16.0	18.2	17.9	19.1	19.5	18.6	21.1	20.2	18.7	217.8
Source: Meteociel

== Population ==
Historical population
Year	Pop.	±% p.a.
1967	10,342	—
1974	11,948	+2.08%
1982	13,078	+1.14%
1990	14,867	+1.62%
1999	20,528	+3.65%
2007	21,283	+0.45%
2012	23,782	+2.25%
2017	24,277	+0.41%
2023	24,665	+0.26%
Source: INSEE

== Education ==
Public preschools include:

- Ecole maternelle Carrère
- Ecole maternelle Albertine Mignard
- Ecole maternelle Pointe à Bacchus

Public primary include:

- Ecole primaire Maurice Chovino
- Ecole primaire Fribert Fessin
- Ecole primaire Robert Freti
- Ecole primaire Marie Bilioti de Gage
- Ecole primaire Hyacinththe Geriac
- Ecole primaire M-thérèse Lamothe
- Ecole primaire La Lézarde
- Ecole maternelle Mayeko Massina
- Ecole primaire Montébello

Public junior high schools include:

- Collège Félix Eboue

Public senior high schools include:

- LGT Droits de l'Homme

== See also ==
- Communes of the Guadeloupe department

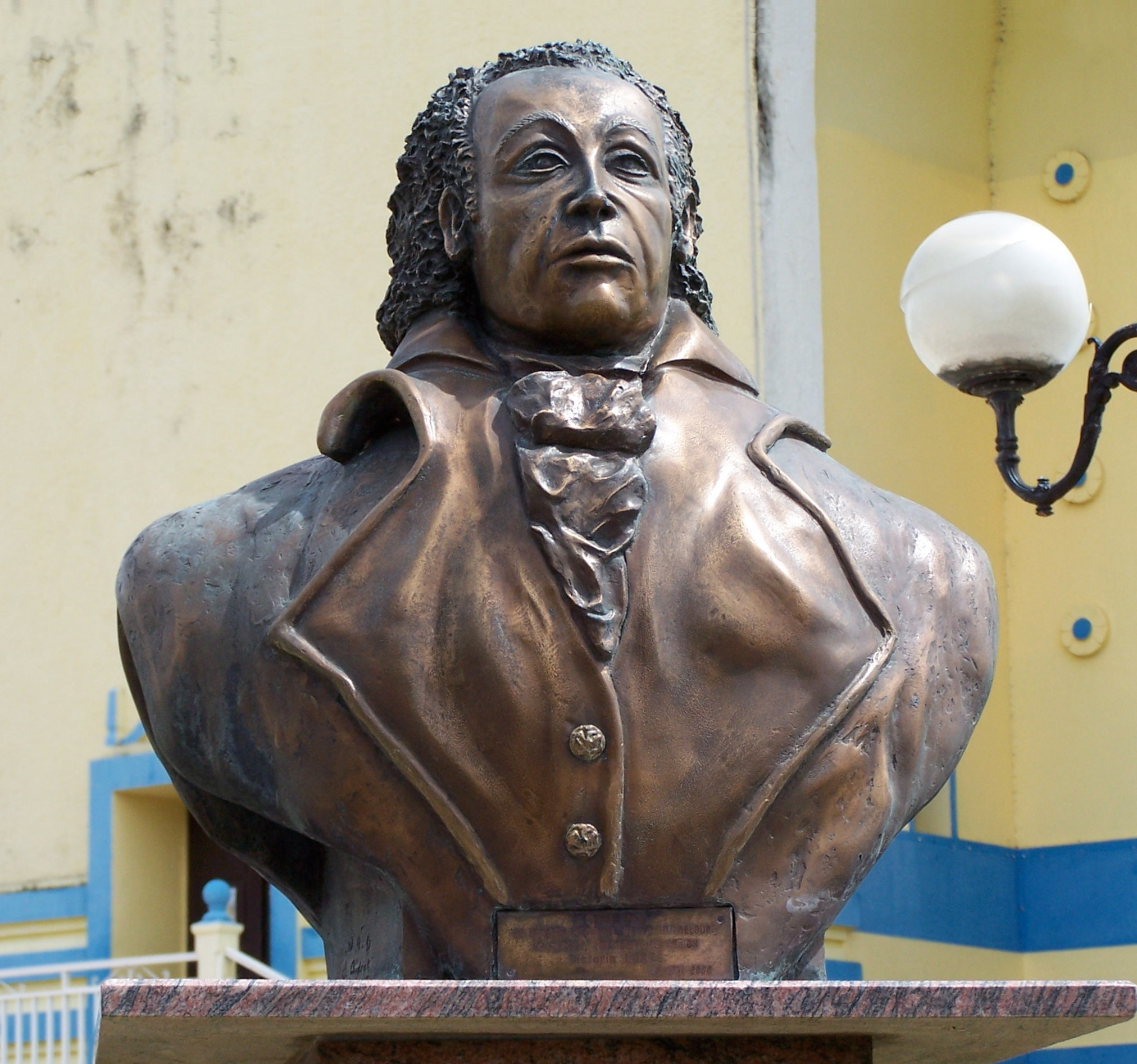
Statue of Louis Delgrès in Petit-Bourg.
