= Sainte-Anne, Guadeloupe =

Sainte-Anne
- Commune
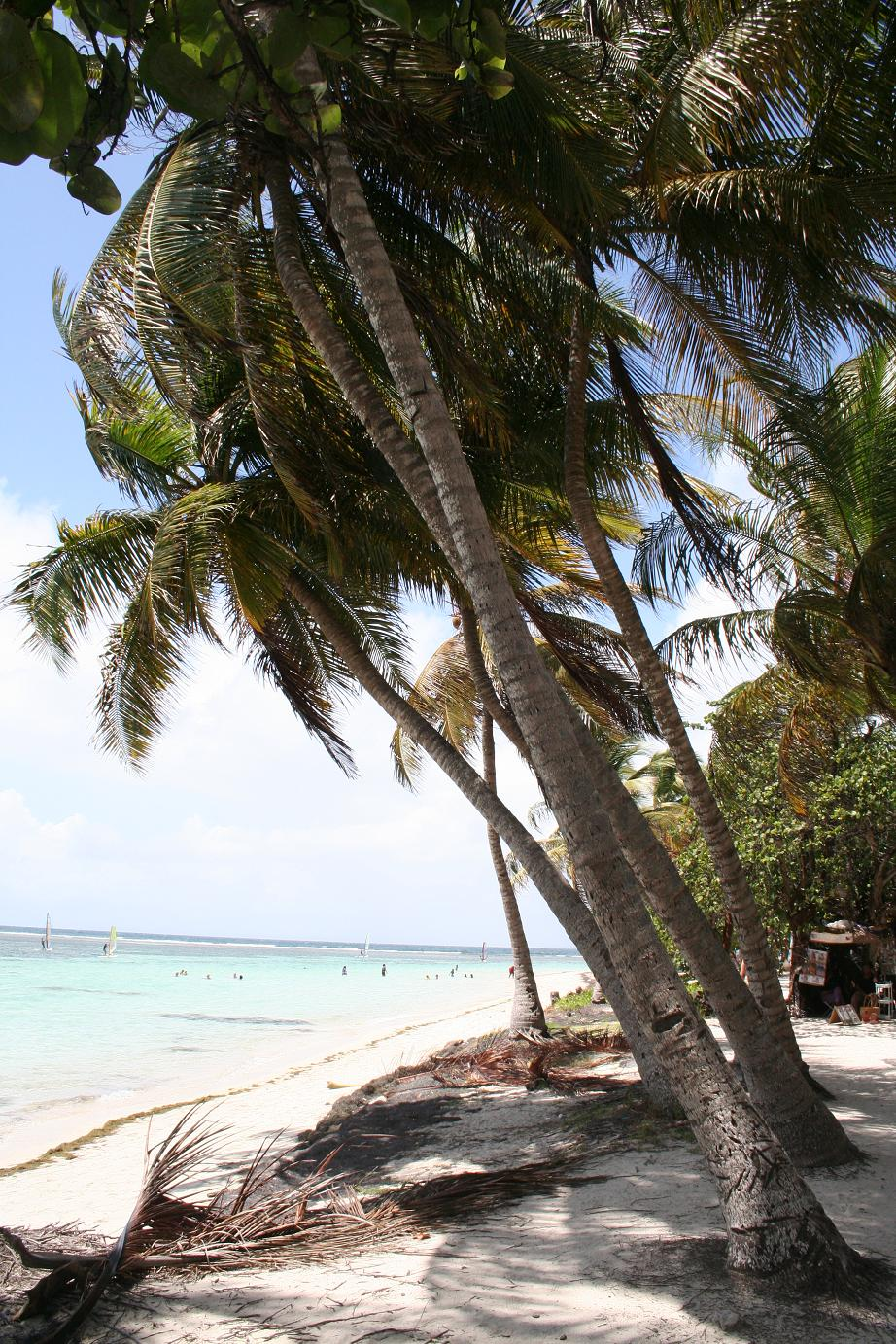
- Morning view at La Carevelle beach

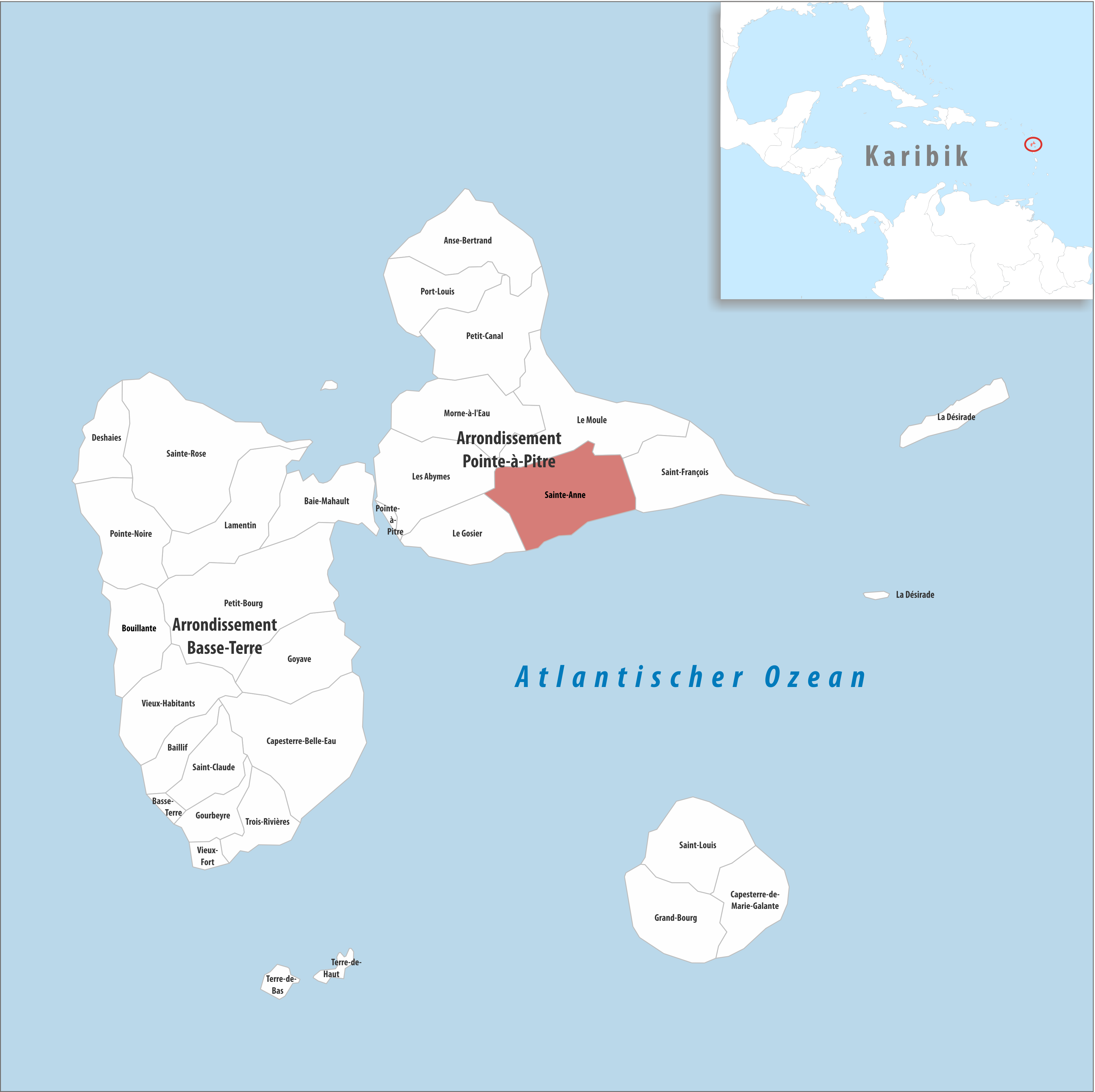
- Location of the commune (in red) within Guadeloupe
- Location of Sainte-Anne
- Coordinates: 16°14′00″N 61°23′00″W
- Country: France
- Overseas region and department: Guadeloupe
- Arrondissement: Pointe-à-Pitre
- Canton: Sainte-Anne and Saint-François
- Intercommunality: CA La Riviéra du Levant

Government
  - Mayor (2022–2026): Francs Baptiste
- Area^{1}: 80.29 km^{2} (31.00 sq mi)
- Highest elevation: 135 m (443 ft)
- Lowest elevation: 0 m (0 ft)
- Population (2023): 23,973
  - Density: 298.6/km^{2} (773.3/sq mi)
- Time zone: UTC−04:00 (AST)
- INSEE/Postal code: 97128 /97180
- ^{1} French Land Register data, which excludes lakes, ponds, glaciers > 1 km^{2} (0.386 sq mi or 247 acres) and river estuaries.

Sainte-Anne (French pronunciation: [sɛ̃t an]; Guadeloupean Creole: Sentann') is a city in the southern part of Grande-Terre, Guadeloupe in the French West Indies. It is one of the most popular tourist destinations of the island, along with Le Gosier and Saint-François.

The commune has developed its tourist infrastructure in recent decades, but still remains dependent on agriculture.

== History ==
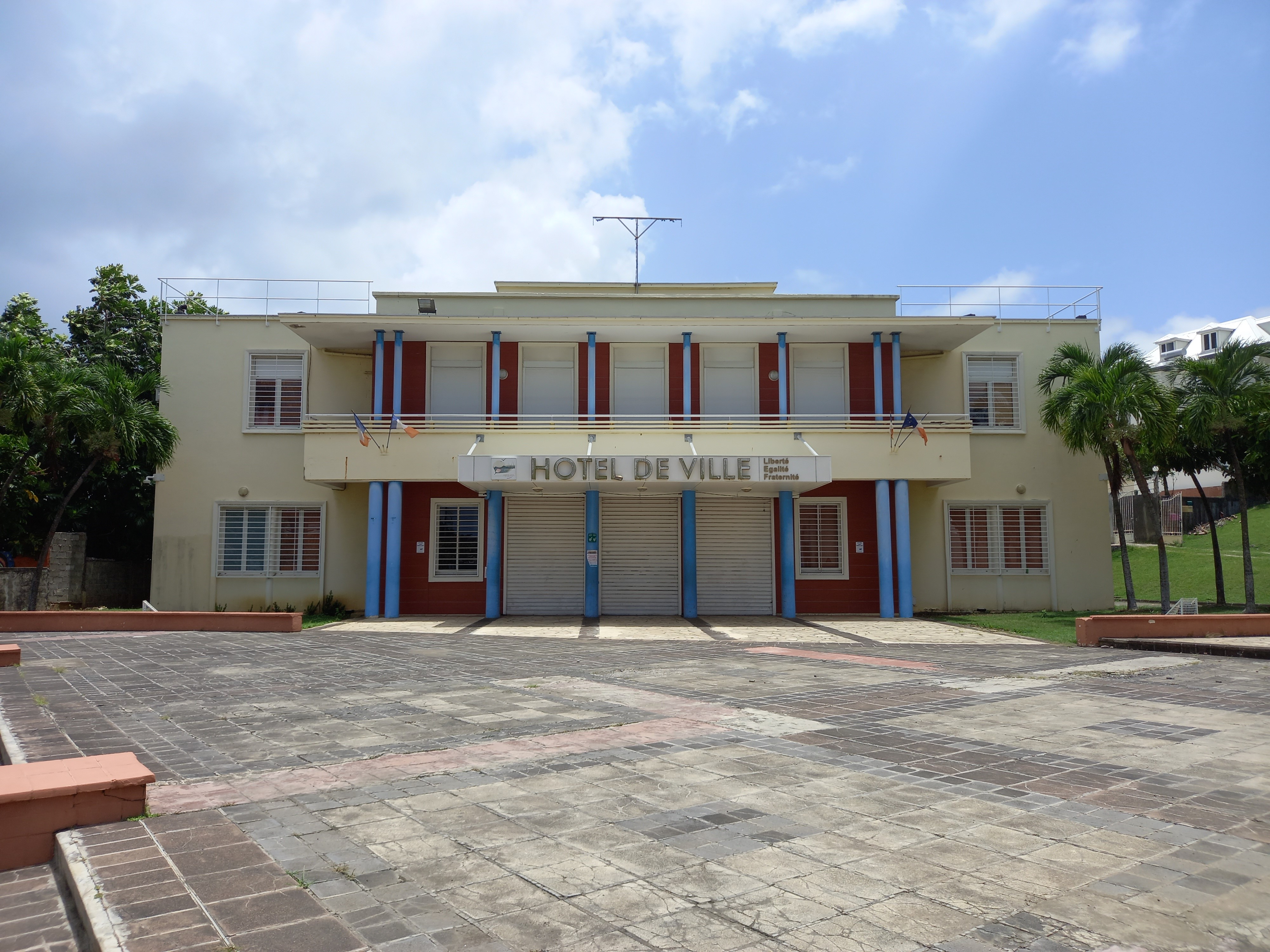
The Hôtel de Ville

The Hôtel de Ville was completed during the mayoralty of Maurice Satineau in around 1950.

== Population ==
Historical population
Year	Pop.	±% p.a.
1967	13,435	—
1974	13,785	+0.37%
1982	13,826	+0.04%
1990	16,934	+2.57%
1999	20,410	+2.10%
2007	23,095	+1.56%
2012	24,712	+1.36%
2017	23,675	−0.85%
2023	23,973	+0.21%
Source: INSEE

== Education ==
Public preschools include:

- Ecole maternelle Marcelle Borifax
- Ecole maternelle Gontran Jhigai
- Ecole maternelle Emmanuel Vilus
- Ecole maternelle Saturnin Palmier
- Ecole maternelle Lacavé Paul
- Ecole maternelle St-Pierre Phirmis
- Ecole maternelle Georges Troupé
- Ecole maternelle Urbino-Camprasse

Public primary schools include:

- Ecole primaire Rigobert Anzala
- Ecole primaire Lucie Calendrier Bicep
- Ecole primaire Florent Donnat
- Ecole primaire Albert Lazard
- Ecole primaire Ginette Maragnes
- Ecole primaire Raymond et Gisèle Mathurine
- Ecole primaire Richard Pierrot
- Ecole primaire Victor Valier

Public junior high schools include:

- Collège Eugène Yssap
- Collège Olympe Rame Decorbin

Public senior high schools include:

- LGT Yves Leborgne

== See also ==
- Communes of the Guadeloupe department
