= Hôtel de Ville, Baie-Mahault =

Town hall in Baie-Mahault, Guadeloupe, France

Hôtel de Ville
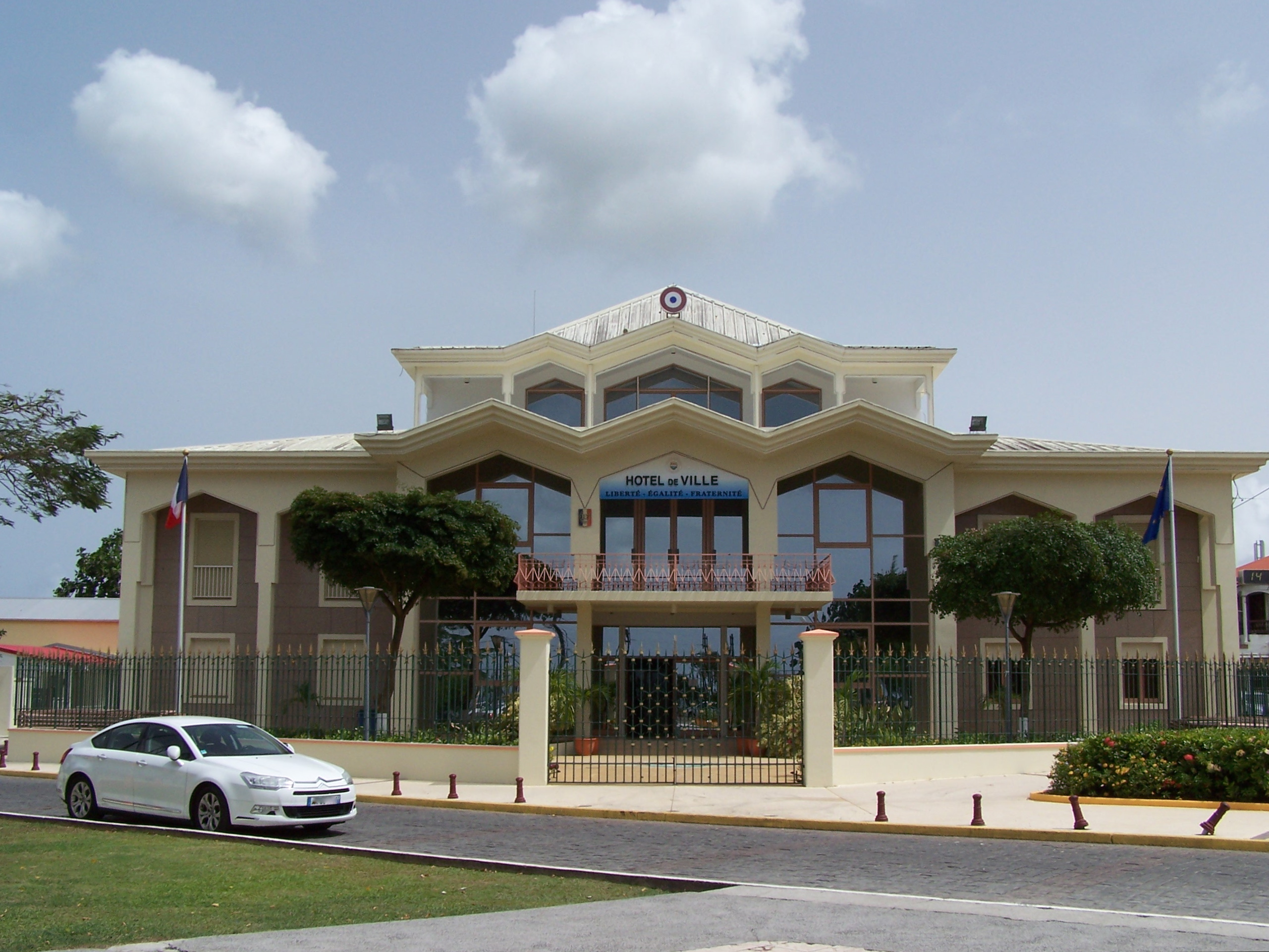
- The main frontage of the Hôtel de Ville in June 2013
- Interactive map of the Hôtel de Ville area

General information
- Type: City hall
- Architectural style: Modern style
- Location: Baie-Mahault, Guadeloupe
- Coordinates: 16.2677°N 61.5870°W
- Completed: 1991

Design and construction
- Architect: Pierre Zobda

The Hôtel de Ville (French pronunciation: [otɛl də vil], City Hall) is a municipal building in Baie-Mahault, Guadeloupe in the Caribbean Sea, standing on Place Childéric Trinqueur.

== History ==
After Baie-Mahault became a separate municipality in 1837, the new town council led by the mayor, François Dubois d'Estrelan, took steps to commission a town hall. The site they selected was in the northern part of the town, close to the sea. The first town hall was designed as a simple two-storey structure, built in timber and completed in around 1845. On both floors, there were verandas formed by iron poles supporting a ceiling above.

On 12 September 1928, a severe hurricane devastated Guadeloupe, severely damaging buildings and leading to 1,200 deaths. In the aftermath of the hurricane, the governor of Guadeloupe, Théophile Antoine Pascal Tellier, asked the French architect, Ali Tur, to prepare designs for the reconstruction of many of the public buildings on the island. The new town hall was designed in a similar style, built in concrete and was completed in 1933.

A war memorial, in the form of a bronze statue of a soldier with a tall stone pier behind, which was intended to commemorate the lives of local people who died in the First World War, was designed by the architect, Edmond Mercier, and the sculptor, Émile André Leroy and unveiled facing the town hall by the governor of the island, Louis Joseph Bouge, in January 1936. It was later designated a monument historique by the French government.

In the late 1980s, following significant population growth, the town council led by the mayor, Édouard Chammougon, decided to commission a more substantial town hall. The site they selected was close to that of the previous town hall. The new building was designed by Pierra Zobda in the modern style, built in concrete and was completed in 1991. The design involved a symmetrical main frontage of seven bays, all with pointed arch heads, facing onto Place Childéric Trinqueur. The central section of three bays was projected forward and surmounted by a canopy. The central bay featured a glass entrance on the ground floor and four French doors on the first floor, while the outer bays of the central section were also glazed. The wings were fenestrated by bi-partite casement windows on both floors. At roof level, there was a three-bay attic also with pointed arches and a canopy. Internally, the principal room was the Salle du Conseil (council chamber).
