= Hôtel de Ville, Le Gosier =

Town hall in Le Gosier, Guadeloupe, France

Hôtel de Ville
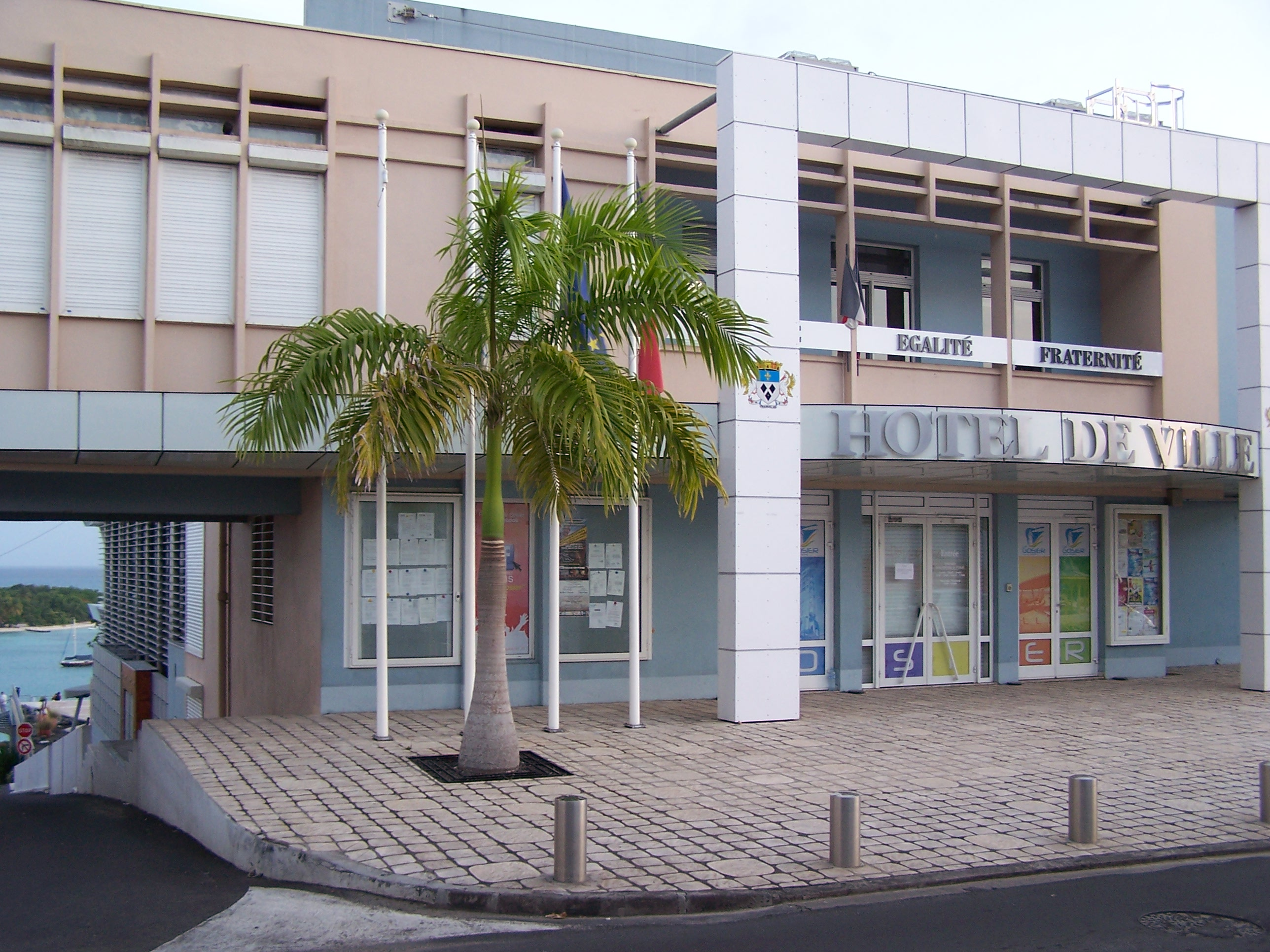
- The main frontage of the Hôtel de Ville in June 2013
- Interactive map of the Hôtel de Ville area

General information
- Type: City hall
- Architectural style: Modern style
- Location: Le Gosier, Guadeloupe
- Coordinates: 16.2060°N 61.4921°W
- Completed: 1931

Design and construction
- Architect: Ali Tur

The Hôtel de Ville (French pronunciation: [otɛl də vil], City Hall) is a municipal building in Le Gosier, Guadeloupe in the Caribbean Sea, standing on Boulevard du Général de Gaulle.

== History ==
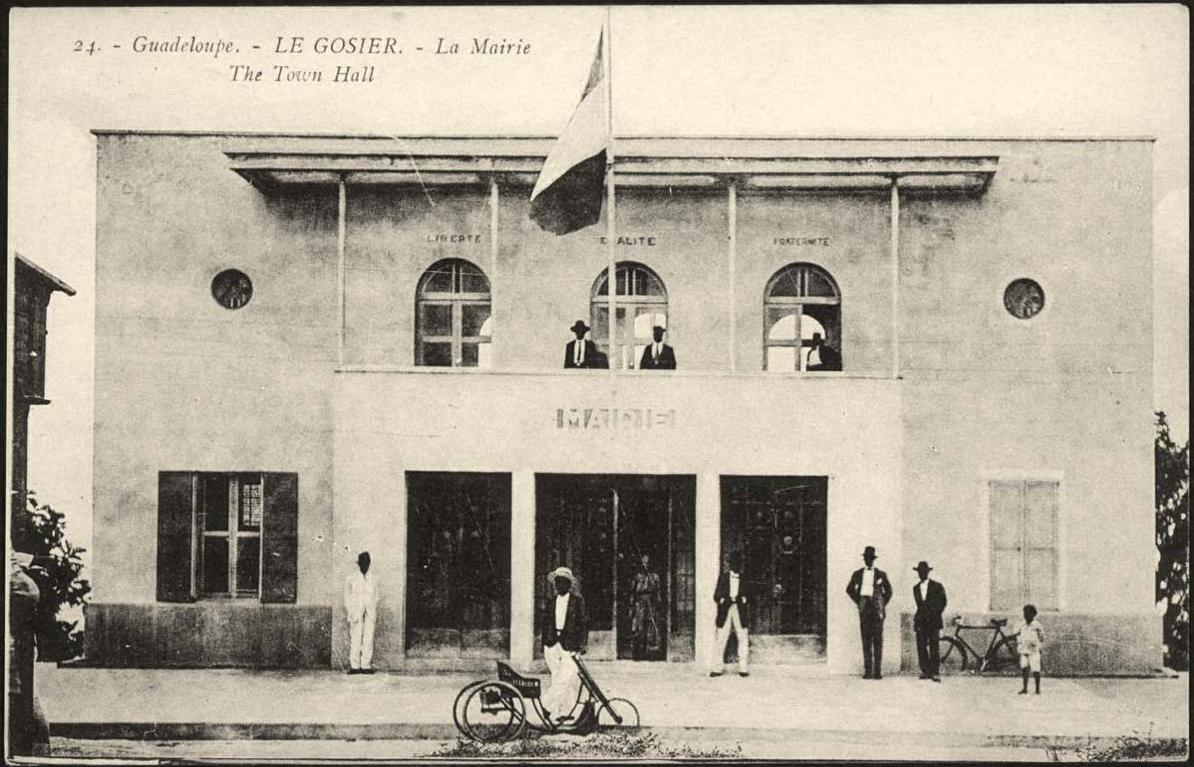
The old town hall

Following significant population growth, largely associated with the local Darbousier sugar factory which was established in 1869, local officials decided to commission a town hall in Le Gosier. The site they selected was on the corner of what is now Boulevard du Général de Gaulle and what is now Rue Félix Éboué. The first town hall was designed as a simple two-storey structure, built in brick with a cement render finish and completed in the late 19th century. The design involved a symmetrical main frontage of five bays. The central section of three bays featured a porch which contained three square-headed openings on the ground floor. Above the porch, there were three round-headed French doors, a balcony and a canopy which was supported by iron columns. The outer bays were fenestrated by casement windows on the ground floor and by oculi on the first floor.

On 12 September 1928, a severe hurricane devastated Guadeloupe, severely damaging buildings and leading to 1,200 deaths. In the aftermath of the hurricane, the Governor of Guadeloupe, Théophile Antoine Pascal Tellier, asked the French architect, Ali Tur, to prepare designs for the reconstruction of many of the public buildings on the island. The site they selected for the new building was on the opposite side of Boulevard du Général de Gaulle and further to the east along it. The new town hall was designed in the modern style, built in concrete and was completed in 1931.

In the 1940s, a war memorial, in the form of six pillars supporting a plaque, which was intended to commemorate the lives of local service personnel who had been killed in the First World War, was installed on the site of the original town hall.

The original design of the new town hall involved a simple structure facing onto the street (the right-hand section of the current structure). Internally, the offices were on the ground floor and a large reception room, which served as both the Salle du Conseil (council chamber) and the Salle des Mariages (wedding room), was established on the first floor. However, the structure was later extended to the east across Rue Victor Schoelcher and, in 2009, it was extended to the south, down towards the sea.
