= Hôtel de Ville, Sainte-Anne, Guadeloupe =

Town hall in Sainte-Anne, Guadeloupe, France

Hôtel de Ville
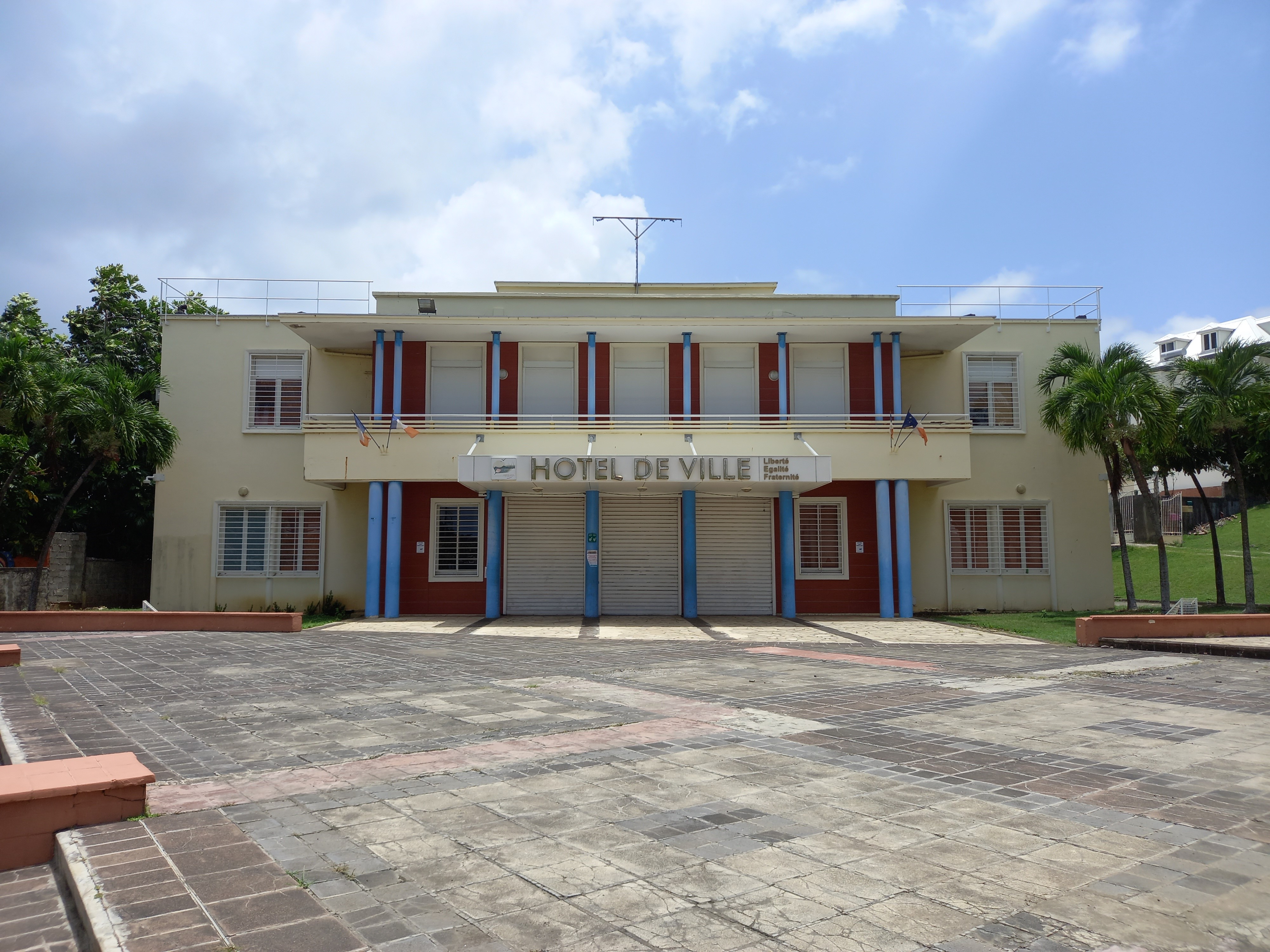
- The main frontage of the Hôtel de Ville in July 2022
- Interactive map of the Hôtel de Ville area

General information
- Type: City hall
- Architectural style: Modern style
- Location: Sainte-Anne, Guadeloupe
- Coordinates: 16.2255°N 61.3859°W
- Completed: c.1950

The Hôtel de Ville (French pronunciation: [otɛl də vil], City Hall) is a municipal building in Sainte-Anne, Guadeloupe in the Caribbean Sea, standing on Place Schœlcher.

== History ==
After Sainte-Anne became a separate municipality in 1837, the new town council led by the mayor, Louis Nicolas Couppé de la Hongrais, took steps to commission a town hall. The site they selected was on the corner of Grand Rue (now Rue Léthière) and what is now Rue du Débarcadère. The first town hall was designed as a simple two-storey structure, built in timber and completed in the mid-19th century. On the first floor, there was a veranda which was jettied out over the pavement along both streets. On 12 September 1928, a severe hurricane devastated Guadeloupe, severely damaging buildings and leading to 1,200 deaths. In the aftermath of the hurricane, the original building was restored and, after it was no longer required for municipal use, it was used to accommodate a school.

After the Second World War, the town council led by a new mayor, Maurice Satineau, decided to develop the area at the north end of Place Schœlcher. The Church of Sainte-Anne had already been rebuilt to a design by the architect, Ali Tur, in 1933. A war memorial, in the form of a female figure on a pedestal, which was intended to commemorate the lives of local people who had died in both world wars, was created by the sculptor, Gilbert Privat, and unveiled to the west of the church in 1949.

The site chosen for the new town hall was immediately to the southwest of the war memorial. It was designed in the modern style, built in concrete and was completed in around 1950. The design involved a symmetrical main frontage of seven bays facing onto the square. The central section of five bays featured three doorways on the ground floor and five casement windows on the first floor. There were eight full-height iron poles supporting a wide balcony on the first floor and the eaves above it. The central section was surmounted by a parapet. The outer bays were fenestrated by bi-partite windows on the ground floor and by single windows on the first floor. Internally, the principal room was the Salle des Délibérations (council chamber).

In the 1990s, the council led by the mayor, Garcin Malsa, commissioned a statue entitled "L'homme debout" (the standing man) as a piece of art for the town hall garden; it has since been removed. A major programme of works, involving the complete restoration of the building, was carried out between September 2024 and July 2025.
