= Léopold Hélène =

Léopold Hélène (October 16, 1926 in Le Gosier, Guadeloupe – February 9, 2012 in Paris, France) was a politician from Guadeloupe who served in the French National Assembly from 1968-1973.
