= Canton of Baie-Mahault-1 =

Coordinates: 16.26°N 61.59°W

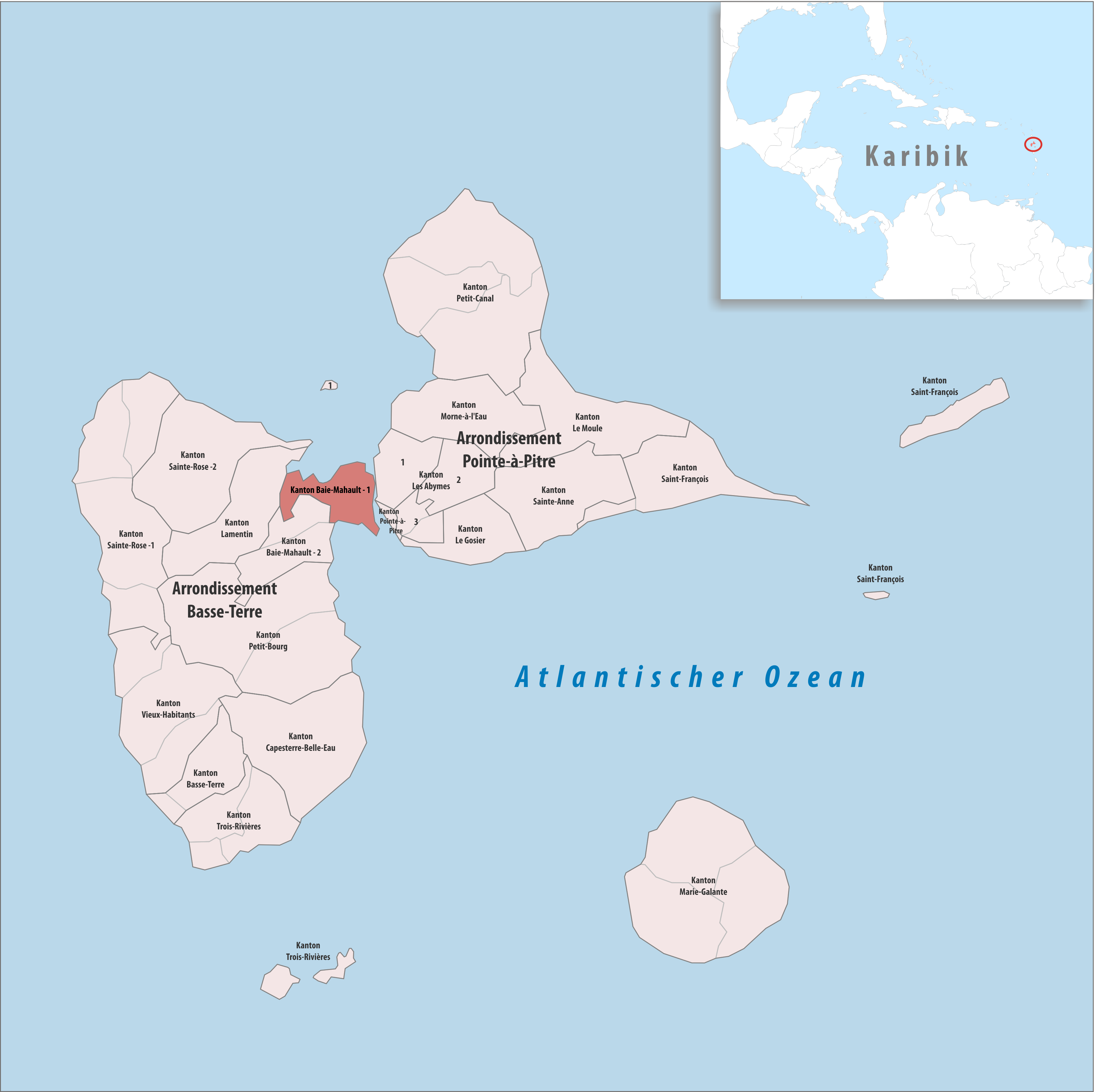

The canton of Baie-Mahault-1 is an administrative division of Guadeloupe, an overseas department and region of France. It was created at the French canton reorganisation which came into effect in March 2015. Its seat is in Baie-Mahault.

It consists of the following communes:

1. Baie-Mahault (partly)
