= Lesly Bengaber =

French basketball player (born 1979)

Lesly Bengaber (born 12 December 1979 in Les Abymes, Guadeloupe), is a French professional basketball player playing for SLUC Nancy. He measures 1.96 m.

== Clubs ==
- 1999–2000: (France) Ajaccio (Nationale 1)
- 2000–2001: (France) Denain (Nationale 2)
- 2001–2003: (France) Bondy (Pro B, then Nationale 1)
- 2003 – beginning 2005: (France) Rueil (Pro B)
- Beginning 2005–2006: (France) Antibes (Pro B)
- 2006–2007: (France) Bourg-en-Bresse (Pro A)
- 2007–2009: (France) Clermont (Pro A)
- Since 2009: (France) SLUC Nancy Basket (Pro A)

== Honours ==
- Champion Guadeloupe 1998–1999
- Champion Antilles-Guyane 1999
