= Les Abymes =

Largest commune in Guadeloupe, France

Les Abymes Zabim
- Commune
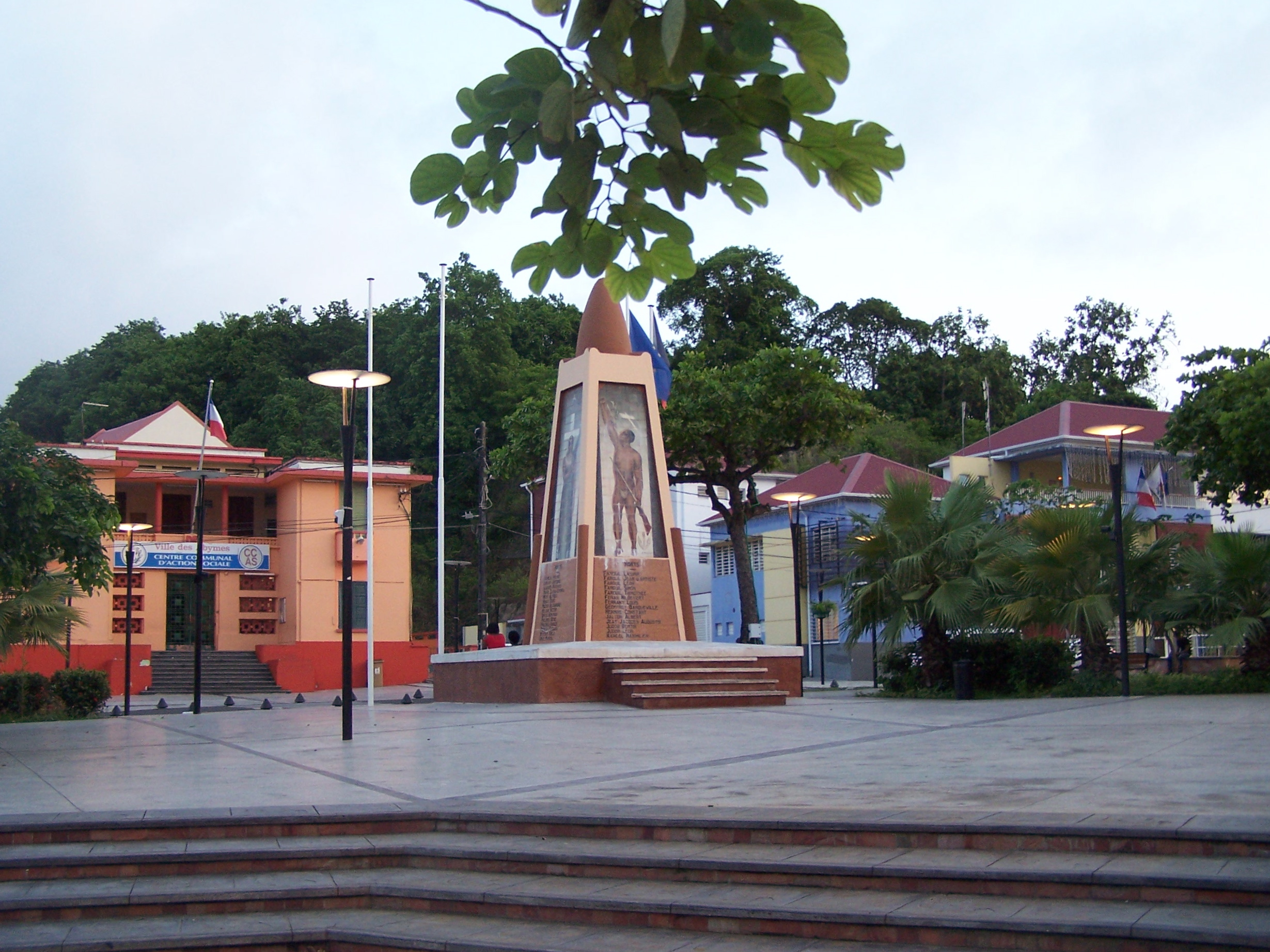
- The Main Square in Les Abymes

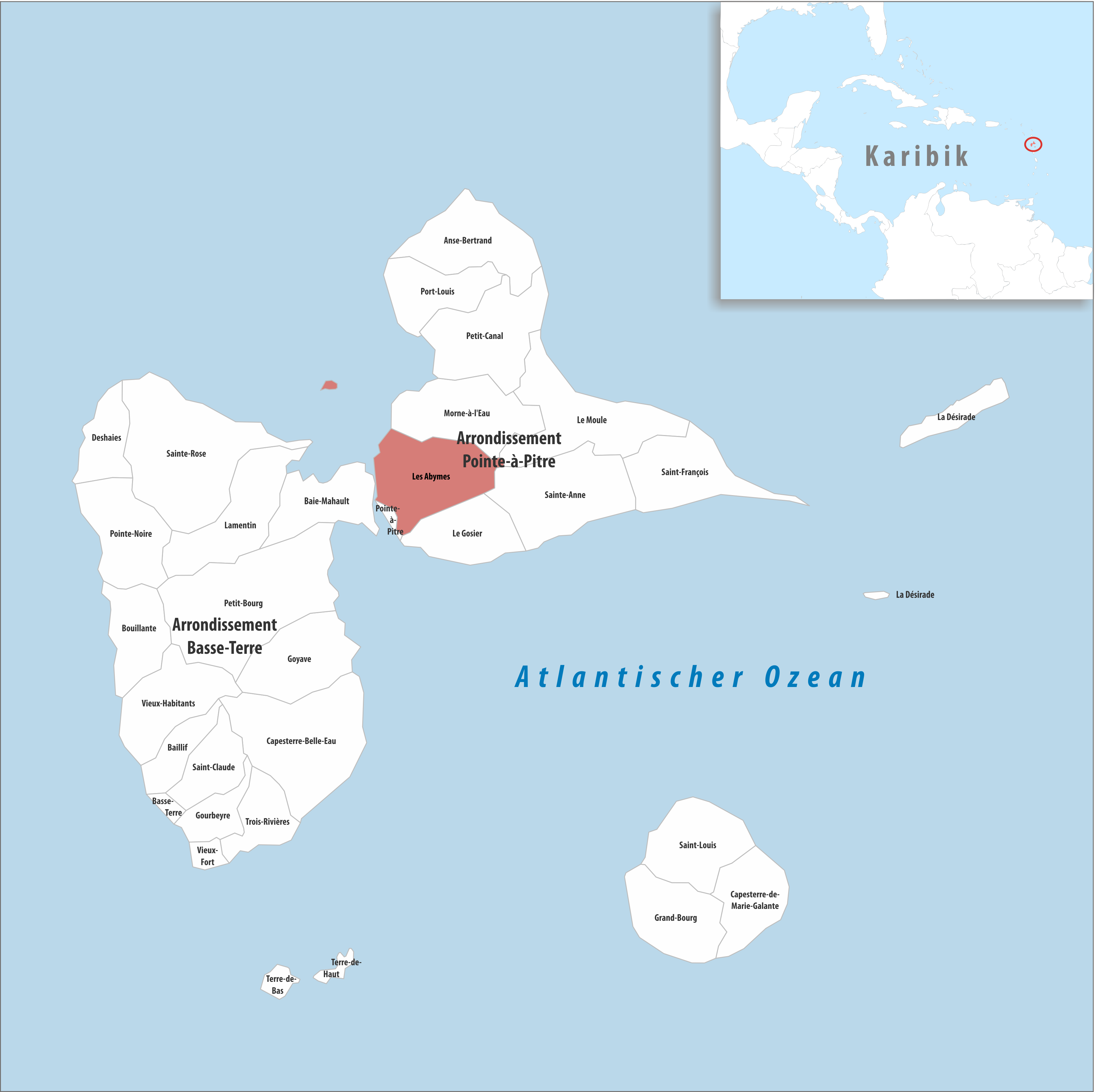
- Location of the commune (in red) within Guadeloupe
- Location of Les Abymes
- Coordinates: 16°16′N 61°31′W
- Country: France
- Overseas region and department: Guadeloupe
- Arrondissement: Pointe-à-Pitre
- Canton: Les Abymes-1, 2 and 3
- Intercommunality: CAP Excellence

Government
  - Mayor (2020–2026): Éric Jalton
- Area^{1}: 81.25 km^{2} (31.37 sq mi)
- Highest elevation: 120 m (390 ft)
- Lowest elevation: 0 m (0 ft)
- Population (2023): 51,055
  - Density: 628.4/km^{2} (1,627/sq mi)
- Time zone: UTC−04:00 (AST)
- INSEE/Postal code: 97101 /97139 and 97142
- ^{1} French Land Register data, which excludes lakes, ponds, glaciers > 1 km^{2} (0.386 sq mi or 247 acres) and river estuaries.

Les Abymes (French pronunciation: [lez‿abim]; Antillean Creole: Zabim) is the most populous commune in the French overseas region and department of Guadeloupe, in the Lesser Antilles. It is located on the west side of the island of Grande-Terre, and is part of the largest metropolitan area of Guadeloupe, which also covers Pointe-à-Pitre.

== Geography ==
Les Abymes is located some 3 km north-east of Pointe-à-Pitre, 7 km east of Baie-Mahault, and 10 km south-west of Morne-à-l'Eau. Access to the commune is by Route nationale N1 from Baie-Mahault in the west which passes along the southern border of the commune and continues south as the N4. The N5 branches off the N1 and goes north-east through the centre of the commune and continues north-east to Morne-a-L'eau. The N11 branches off the N5 on the south-east of the town and continues north-west then west rejoining the N1. The D106 road also goes north from the commune to Vieux Bourg. The Route du Palais Royal passes north-east through the commune to join the N5. The Route de Chazeau branches from the Route du Palais Royal and goes north-east to Doubs.

Access to the Pointe-à-Pitre International Airport is from the N11.

Les Abymes is integrated into the urban area of Pointe-à-Pitre and, like the rest of the island, has a tropical climate.

=== Neighbouring communes and villages ===
Source:

=== Climate ===
Les Abymes has a tropical monsoon climate (Köppen climate classification Am). The average annual temperature in Les Abymes is 26.7 °C (80.1 °F). The average annual rainfall is 1,557.8 mm (61.33 in) with October as the wettest month. The temperatures are highest on average in August, at around 28.1 °C (82.6 °F), and lowest in February, at around 25.0 °C (77.0 °F). The highest temperature ever recorded in Les Abymes was 34.2 °C (93.6 °F) on 21 July 2001 and 10 August 1995; the coldest temperature ever recorded was 13.0 °C (55.4 °F) on 4 February 1958.

Climate data for Les Abymes (Le Raizet Airport, altitude 11m, 1991–2020 normals, extremes 1951–present)
Month	Jan	Feb	Mar	Apr	May	Jun	Jul	Aug	Sep	Oct	Nov	Dec	Year
Record high °C (°F)	31.8 (89.2)	32.1 (89.8)	32.8 (91.0)	33.3 (91.9)	33.3 (91.9)	33.4 (92.1)	34.2 (93.6)	34.2 (93.6)	34.1 (93.4)	34.1 (93.4)	33.4 (92.1)	32.4 (90.3)	34.2 (93.6)
Mean daily maximum °C (°F)	29.1 (84.4)	29.1 (84.4)	29.6 (85.3)	30.2 (86.4)	30.8 (87.4)	31.4 (88.5)	31.6 (88.9)	31.8 (89.2)	31.6 (88.9)	31.3 (88.3)	30.5 (86.9)	29.6 (85.3)	30.6 (87.1)
Daily mean °C (°F)	25.0 (77.0)	25.0 (77.0)	25.4 (77.7)	26.3 (79.3)	27.3 (81.1)	27.9 (82.2)	28.0 (82.4)	28.1 (82.6)	27.8 (82.0)	27.4 (81.3)	26.5 (79.7)	25.6 (78.1)	26.7 (80.1)
Mean daily minimum °C (°F)	20.9 (69.6)	20.9 (69.6)	21.1 (70.0)	22.4 (72.3)	23.7 (74.7)	24.5 (76.1)	24.5 (76.1)	24.3 (75.7)	24.0 (75.2)	23.5 (74.3)	22.6 (72.7)	21.6 (70.9)	22.8 (73.0)
Record low °C (°F)	13.5 (56.3)	13.0 (55.4)	13.9 (57.0)	15.8 (60.4)	16.4 (61.5)	18.9 (66.0)	19.6 (67.3)	19.8 (67.6)	19.5 (67.1)	19.0 (66.2)	16.8 (62.2)	14.4 (57.9)	13.0 (55.4)
Average precipitation mm (inches)	89.3 (3.52)	58.2 (2.29)	72.3 (2.85)	98.9 (3.89)	122.5 (4.82)	105.2 (4.14)	134.6 (5.30)	162.8 (6.41)	198.3 (7.81)	202.7 (7.98)	186.4 (7.34)	126.6 (4.98)	1,557.8 (61.33)
Average precipitation days (≥ 1.0 mm)	15.7	12.8	11.4	12.2	12.7	13.2	15.3	16.4	16.1	16.6	17.0	16.4	175.8
Mean monthly sunshine hours	200.9	190.7	214.0	209.0	215.1	209.5	213.8	223.2	199.3	197.7	182.5	193.4	2,449
Source: Météo-France

== History ==
The islands have been occupied since Pre-Columbian era. Some remains have been found in the Dothémare area but the most remarkable were those found in Belle Plaine where surveys conducted by the Direction régionale des affaires culturelles (DRAC) in 2006 revealed the existence of a sizeable town dated from 1000 and 1200 AD (Troumassoid culture).

The first village, located a few kilometres from the current urban centre, was founded in 1691. It consisted of a few houses and experienced some development through the cultivation of sugar cane, cocoa, and coffee. A Parish Church was built in Les Abymes in 1726.

== Administration ==
Les Abymes belongs to the community of communes called Cap Excellence which brings it together with Pointe-à-Pitre and Baie-Mahault. The commune is divided into three cantons:

- Canton of Les Abymes-1;
- Canton of Les Abymes-2;
- Canton of Les Abymes-3, which also includes part of Le Gosier.

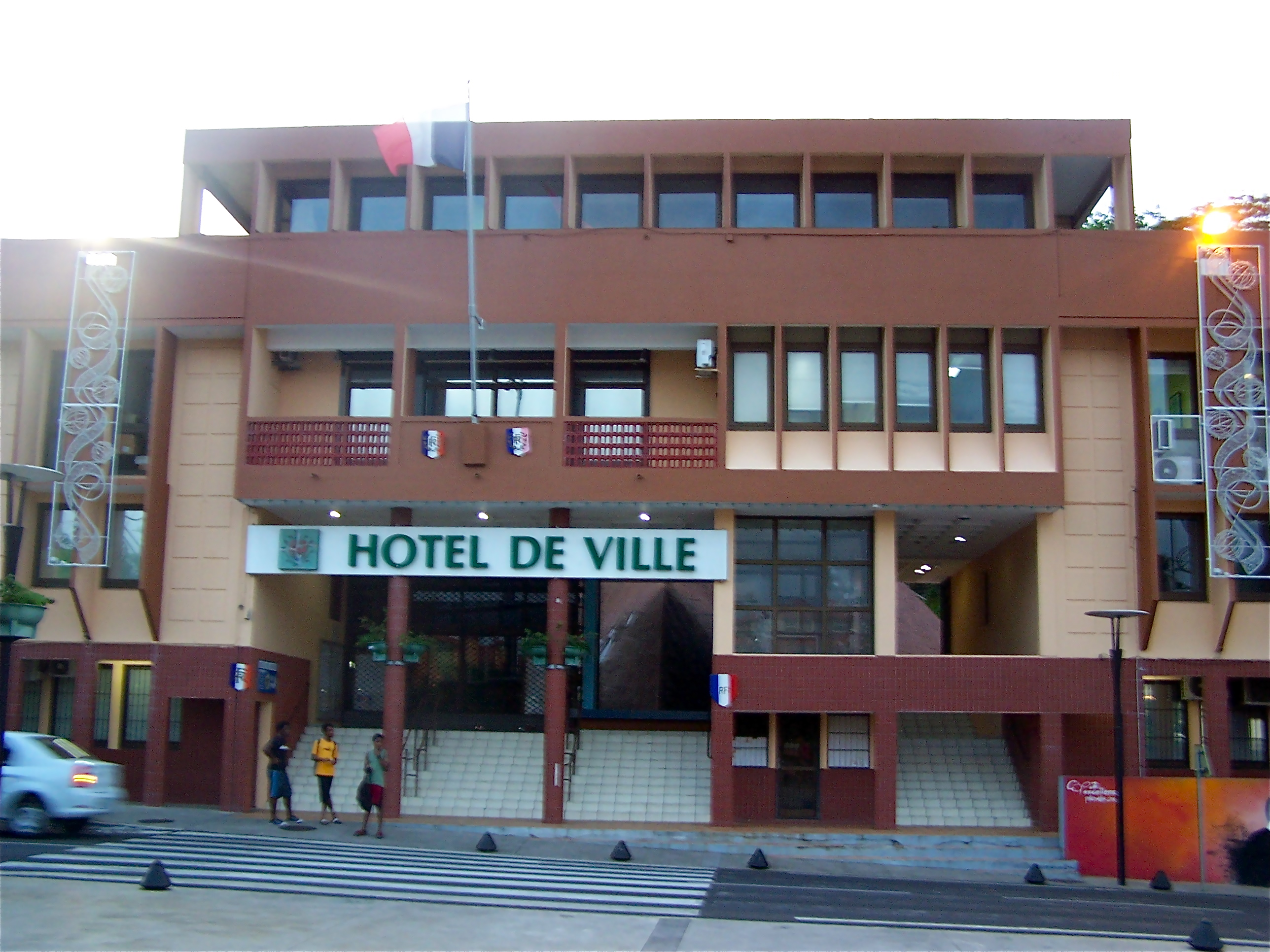
The Hôtel de Ville

List of Successive Mayors

From	To	Name
1965	1967	Maurice Fleury
1967	1995	Frédéric Jalton
1995	1995	René-Serge Nabajoth
1995	2008	Daniel Marsin
2008	2026	Éric Jalton

The current Hôtel de Ville was completed in 1986.

=== Twinning ===
Les Abymes has twinning associations with:

- Boucherville (Canada) since 1988.
- Créteil (France)

== Demography ==
The inhabitants of the commune are known as Abymiens or Abymiennes in French.

Historical population

Year	Pop.	±% p.a.
1954	18,425	—
1961	30,791	+7.61%
1967	39,911	+4.42%
1974	53,605	+4.30%
1982	56,165	+0.58%
1990	62,605	+1.37%

Year	Pop.	±% p.a.
1999	63,054	+0.08%
2007	59,404	−0.74%
2012	58,606	−0.27%
2017	53,491	−1.81%
2023	51,055	−0.77%

Source: INSEE

== Economy ==
Most of the economic activity of Les Abymes is related to the presence of the Pointe-à-Pitre International Airport (formerly Aéroport du Raizet). The airline Air Caraïbes has its headquarters in Les Abymes.

Although not a resort, Les Abymes is the second most important economic centre of Guadeloupe after the industrial zone of Jarry. The Milénis shopping centre is located in the commune. The "Family Plaza Complex" including a multiplex cinema, a shopping mall, and a leisure centre is due to open in 2015.

== Facilities ==
=== Education ===
There are several educational institutions in the commune:

Public primary level:

- 15 public preschools
- 20 public primary schools
- 2 public elementary schools

Public junior high schools:

- Collège du Bourg;
- Collège du Raizet;
- Collège Alexandre-Isaac; (named after Alexandre Isaac, Senator)
- Collège Saint-John-Perse;
- Collège Excellence-Sportive;

Public sixth-form colleges/senior high schools:

- LGT Baimbridge
- Lycée Jardin-d'Essai - General sixth-form/high school and technological high school
- LGT Félix Proto
- LPO Chevalier de Saint-Georges

Private primary level:

- 3 private primary schools
- 1 private elementary school

Private secondary schools under contract:

- Lycée La Persévérance - private school for general and technological education
- Lycée Professionnel esthétique/coiffure

The Apprentice Training School for the Chamber of Crafts of Guadeloupe.

Former schools??

- Lycée Général Providence - General sixth-form/high school and technological high school

The commune also hosts the headquarters of the Rector of the Académie de la Guadeloupe ("Academy of Guadeloupe"). A new building is under construction in the Dothémare-Providence ZAC scheduled for completion in the first quarter 2015.

=== Health ===
The University Hospital (CHU) of Pointe-à-Pitre / Les Abymes was the largest on the island in 2013 bringing together some 40 hospital services covering all medical fields with a total capacity of 862 beds with 319 doctors, 120 interns, and 3,000 hospital workers. The hospital is to be rebuilt at Perrin (commencing 2016 for delivery in 2019).

The Polyclinic of Guadeloupe is located at Morne Jolivière and is a private care centre with a total capacity of 110 beds including 20 beds for maternity.

== Culture ==
- The Sonis Cultural Centre
- The Renée Élie Hall' at Chazeau
- The Joseph Théodore Faustin Hall
- A Multiplex Cinema at the "Family Plaza Complex" (under construction, expected completion June 2015)
- The Félix-Proto Community Centre (under construction, expected completion end of 2015)

== Culture and heritage ==
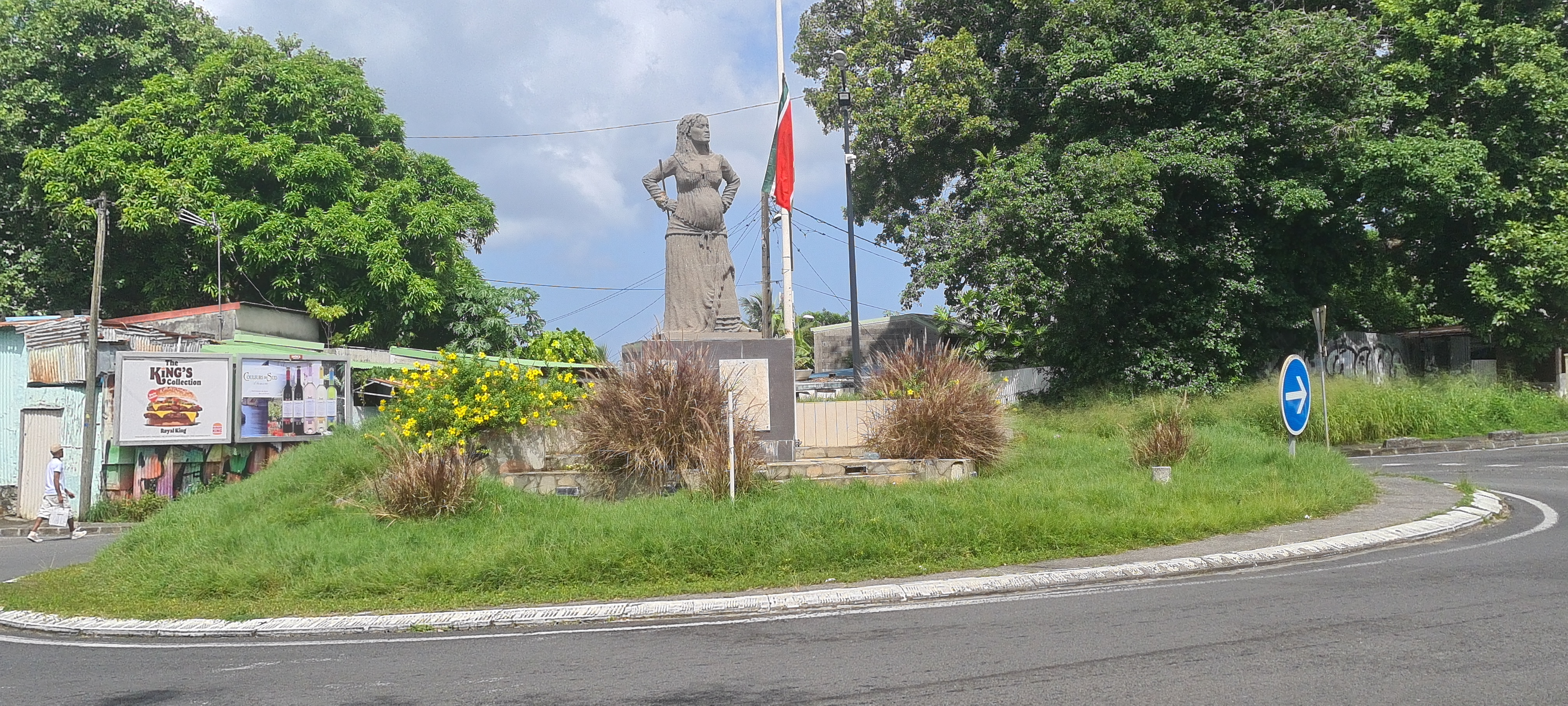
La Mulâtresse Solitude, in Les Abymes.

=== Civil heritage ===
The commune has a number of buildings and structures that are registered as historical monuments:

- A Revenue Office on Rue Frédéric (1932)
- The former Town Hall on Rue du Général Delacroix (1933)
- A Sepulchral Monument on Rue du Général Delacroix (1932)
- The Joseph Ricou Hospital on Rue de l'Hôpital (1931)
- The Market in the Place du Marché (1931)
- The War Memorial (1937)
- The 'Petrelluzzi House' at Morne-Fleuri (20th century)
- The 'Mamiel Dwelling' (19th century)

Other sites of interest

- The mangroves
- The Taonaba Mangrove House
- The Perrin and Belle Plaine Channel
- A Memorial from 1889 for the centenary of the French Revolution
- The Abymes, Land of convergence Monument at the entry to the town showing the location of different communities on the island.
- La Mulâtresse Solitude (1772–1802), a statue erected in 1999 in the Baimbridge district in memory of resistance against slavery, by the sculptor Jacky Poulier.
- A Statue of Nelson Mandela erected in 2014 at the Petit-Pérou roundabout in memory of the President of South Africa, by the sculptor Jean Moisa

=== Religious heritage ===
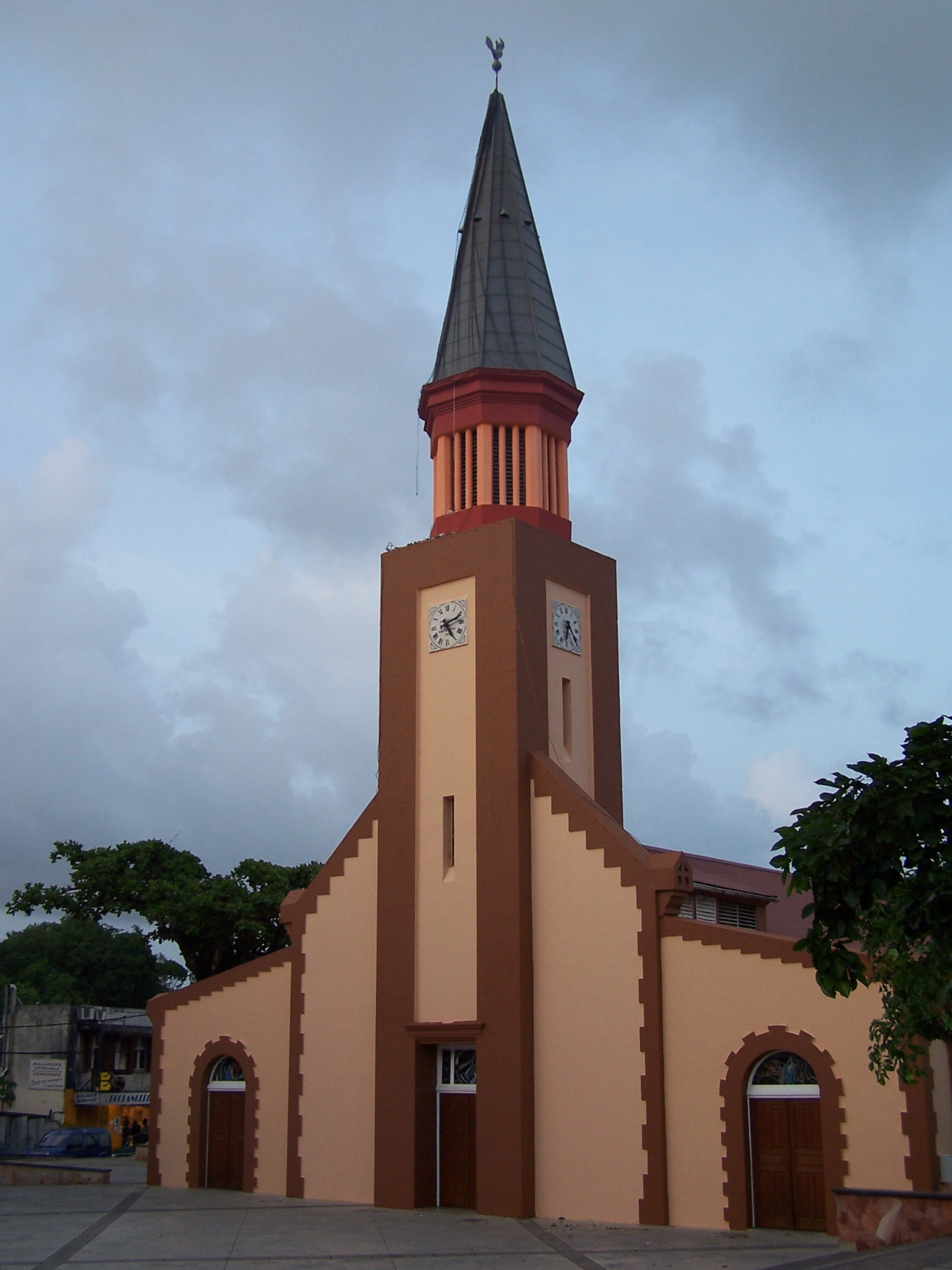
The Church of the Immaculate Conception

The commune has two religious buildings and structures that are registered as historical monuments:

- The Parish Church of the Immaculate Conception (1930)
- A Presbytery at Rue Schoelcher (1932)

Other religious sites of interest

- A Hindu Temple
- A Calvary

== Sports ==
Sports Facilities

- The Stade René Serge Nabajoth (capacity: 7,500 people)
- Inter-communal Swimming Pool at Dugazon
- Tennis
- Golf (9 holes)
- The Centre of Sports Resources, expertise, and performance (CREPS) of Antilles Guyana is located in the commune, on an area of 9 hectares on the site of the old Darboussier stadium.

Sports Clubs

- Jeunesse Sportive Abymienne, football and Handball
- Le Siroco, football
- Jeunesse Evolution, football
- La Juventa, football
- la MJC Abymes, football, Basketball
- JCA (Jeunesse Cycliste des Abymes), cycling
- CSCA (Convergence Sportive Cycliste des Abymes), cycling
- VO2C (Vélo d'Or du Centre de la Caraïbe), cycling
- AS Police, cycling
- BRUC (Boisripeaux Rugby Club), rugby

== Notable people linked to the commune ==
- Admiral T (born 1981), reggae-dancehall créole artiste
- Pegguy Arphexad (born 1973), former footballer for Liverpool F.C.
- Christine Arron (born 1973), athlete
- Lesly Bengaber (born 1979), French professional basketball player
- Nathalie Dechy (born 1979), tennis player
- Adrianna Lamalle (born 1982), athlete
- Thomas Phibel (born 1986), footballer
- Florent (born 1981), basketball player. Older brother of Mickael Pietrus
- Mickaël Piétrus (born 1982), former NBA player, 11th pick in the 2003 NBA draft to the Golden State Warriors.
- Jacques Schwarz-Bart (born 1962), jazz saxophonist
- David Sommeil (born 1974), footballer
- Ronald Zubar (born 1985), footballer
- Kery James (born 1977), rapper, producer, interpreter
- Pascal Chimbonda (born 1979), footballer
- Teddy Riner (born 1989), judoka
- Livio Nabab (born 1988), footballer at SM Caen
- Wilhem Belocian (born 1995), athlete
- Miguel Comminges, professional football player
- Karla Homolka aka Emily/Leanne Bordelais, convicted serial killer
- Ysaora Thibus (born 1991), foil fencer, Olympic medalist

== See also ==
- Communes of the Guadeloupe department

=== External links ===
- Les Abymes official website (in French)
- Guadeloupe General Council website (in French)
- Pointe-à-Pitre International Airport (Aéroport Guadeloupe Pôle Caraïbes) (in French)
- Les Abymes on Géoportail, National Geographic Institute (IGN) website (in French)
