= Communauté d'agglomération CAP Excellence =

CAP Excellence
- Communauté d'agglomération
- Location of CAP Excellence within the department
- Coordinates: 16°15′N 61°32′W
- Country: France
- Overseas region and department: Guadeloupe{{{region}}}
- No. of communes: {{{nbcomm}}}
- Established: 2008
- Area: 129.9 km^{2} (50.2 sq mi)
- Population (2019): 99,532
  - Density: 766.2/km^{2} (1,985/sq mi)
- Website: www.capexcellence.net

Communauté d'agglomération CAP Excellence is a communauté d'agglomération, an intercommunal structure in the Guadeloupe overseas department and region of France. Created in 2008, its seat is in Pointe-à-Pitre. Its area is 129.9 km^{2}. Its population was 99,532 in 2019.

== Composition ==
The communauté d'agglomération consists of the following 3 communes:

1. Les Abymes
2. Baie-Mahault
3. Pointe-à-Pitre
