= Hôtel de Ville, Petit-Bourg =

Town hall in Petit-Bourg, Guadeloupe, France

Hôtel de Ville
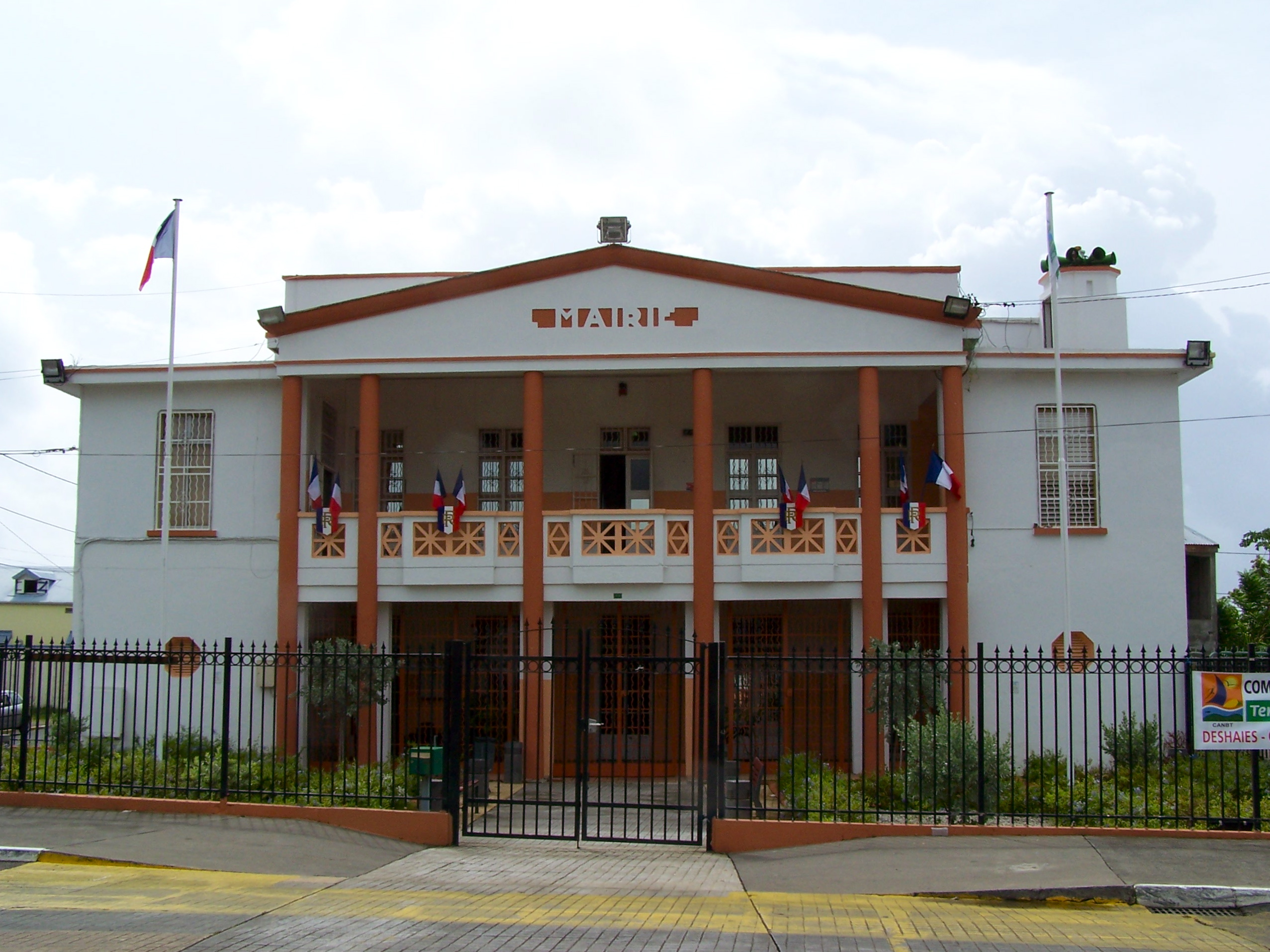
- The main frontage of the Hôtel de Ville in May 2013
- Interactive map of the Hôtel de Ville area

General information
- Type: City hall
- Architectural style: Art Deco style
- Location: Petit-Bourg, Guadeloupe
- Coordinates: 16.1915°N 61.5905°W
- Completed: 1932

Design and construction
- Architect: Ali Tur

The Hôtel de Ville (French pronunciation: [otɛl də vil], City Hall) is a municipal building in Petit-Bourg, Guadeloupe in the Caribbean Sea, standing on Rue Victor Schoelcher.

== History ==
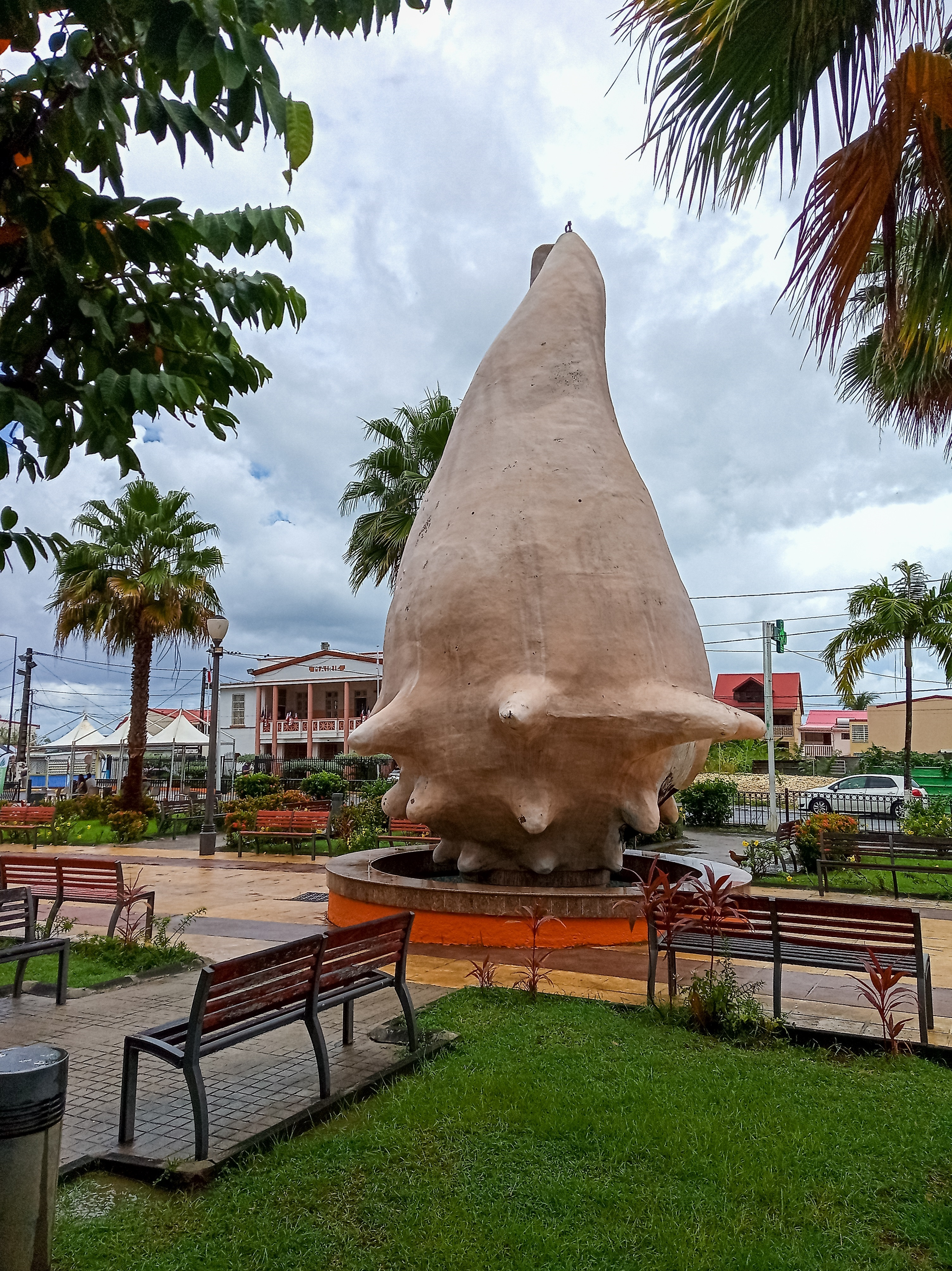
Monument to the victims of the shooting in October 1910

After Petit-Bourg became a separate municipality in 1837, the new town council led by the mayor, Charles Léopold De Rozières, took steps to commission a town hall. The site they selected was in the centre of the town close to the sea. The first town hall was probably designed as a simple two-storey structure, built in timber and completed in the mid-19th century.

On 16 October 1910, during a period of great social unrest stirred up between competing candidates in a local election, the gendarmes fired into a crowd of people assembled in front of the town hall on the orders of the governor, Henri François Charles Cor: seven people were killed and two died later from their injuries. A memorial, in the form of a giant conch shell, was subsequently erected to commemorate their lives.

On 12 September 1928, a severe hurricane devastated Guadeloupe, severely damaging buildings and leading to 1,200 deaths. In the aftermath of the hurricane, the governor of Guadeloupe, Théophile Antoine Pascal Tellier, asked the French architect, Ali Tur, to prepare designs for the reconstruction of many of the public buildings on the island. The new town hall was designed in the Art Deco style, built in concrete and was completed in around 1932.

The design involved a symmetrical main frontage of seven bays facing onto what is now Rue Victor Schoelcher. The central section of five bays featured verandas on both floors and the bays of that section were flanked by iron poles supporting a pediment above. Internally, the principal room was the Salle du Conseil (council chamber).
