= Baie-Mahault =

Commune in Guadeloupe, France

- Commune
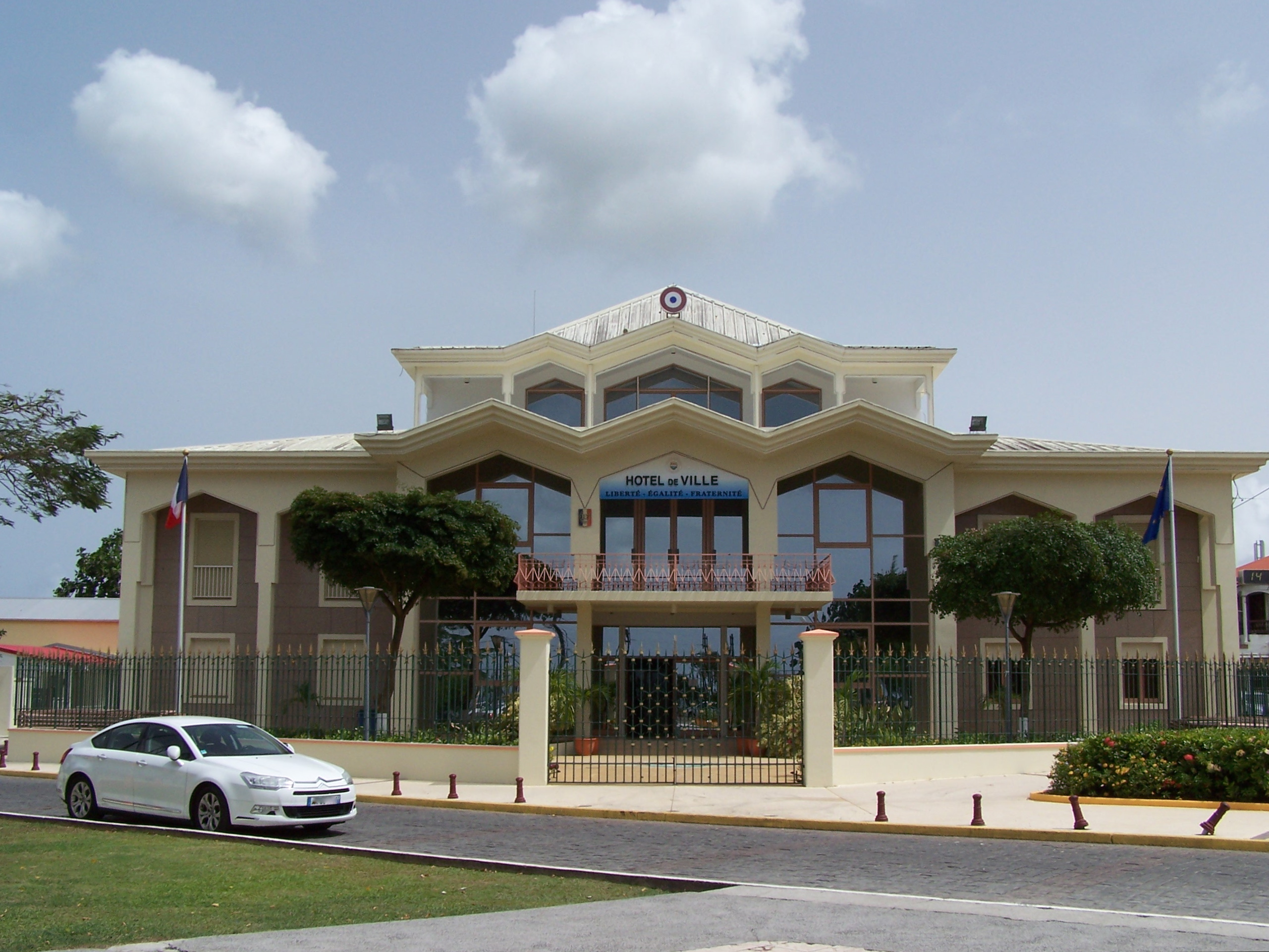
- The Hôtel de Ville

- Coat of arms

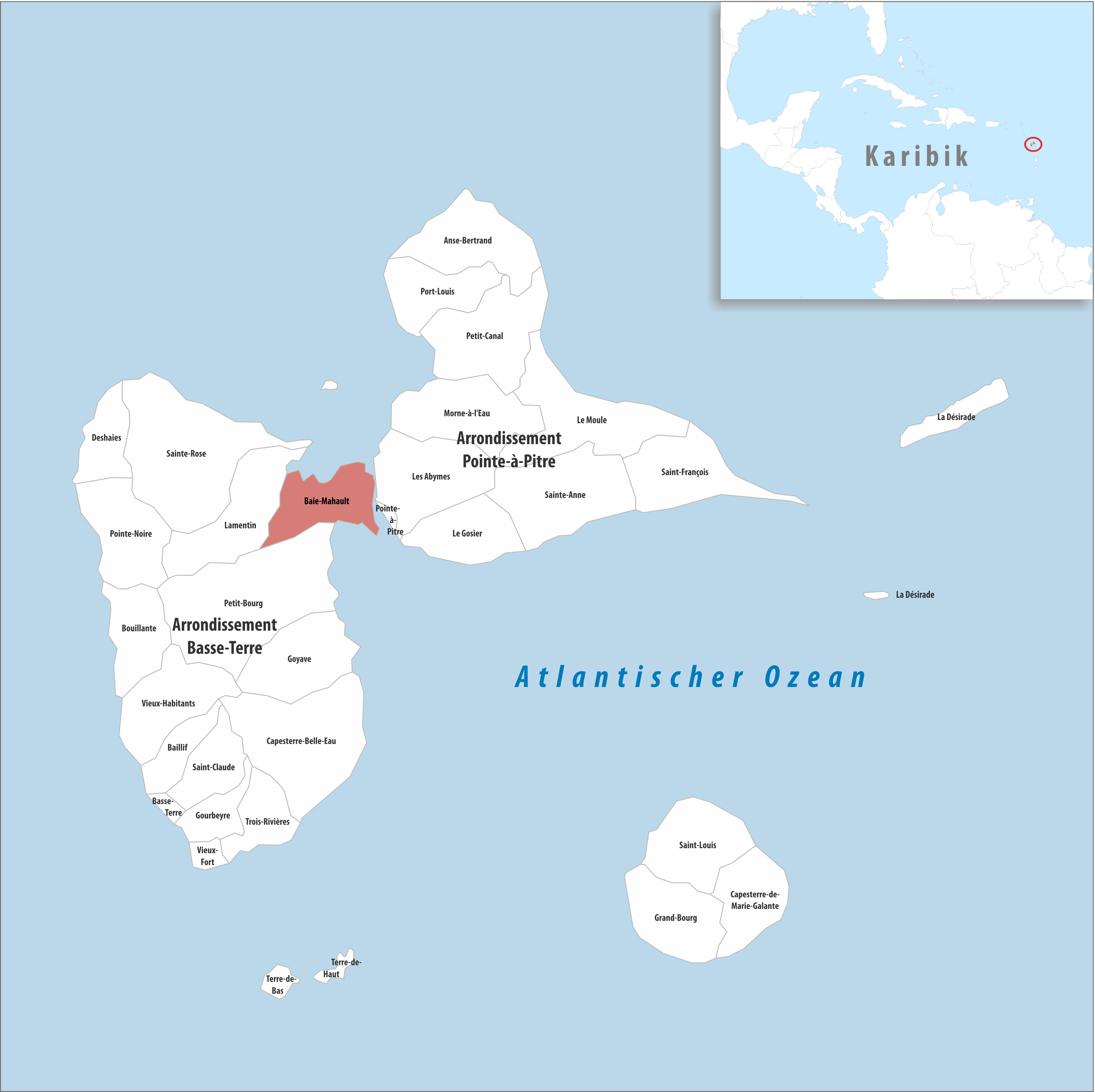
- Location of the commune (in red) within Guadeloupe
- Location of Baie-Mahault
- Location within France
- Coordinates: 16°16′N 61°35′W
- Country: France
- Overseas region and department: Guadeloupe
- Arrondissement: Basse-Terre
- Canton: Baie-Mahault-1 and 2
- Intercommunality: CAP Excellence

Government
  - Mayor (2020–2026): Hélène Polifonte Molia
- Area^{1}: 46.00 km^{2} (17.76 sq mi)
- Highest elevation: 112 m (367 ft)
- Lowest elevation: 0 m (0 ft)
- Population (2023): 30,924
  - Density: 672.3/km^{2} (1,741/sq mi)
- Time zone: UTC−04:00 (AST)
- INSEE/Postal code: 97103 /97122
- Website: www.baiemahault.fr
- ^{1} French Land Register data, which excludes lakes, ponds, glaciers > 1 km^{2} (0.386 sq mi or 247 acres) and river estuaries.

Baie-Mahault (French pronunciation: [bɛ ma.o]; Guadeloupean Creole: Bémao) is a commune in the overseas department and region of Guadeloupe, France. It is the second most populated commune of Guadeloupe, after Les Abymes. The extensive industrial zone of Jarry in Baie-Mahault is by far the most industrialized commune in the islands and the largest industrial park in the Lesser Antilles. It is part of the urban area of Pointe-à-Pitre, the largest metropolitan area in Guadeloupe, located in the northwest.

The inhabitants of Baie-Mahault are called Baie-Mahaultiens.

== History ==
Baie-Mahault may be named for a variety of mangrove called mahault or mahot common in this area.

On 29 November 1808, during the Napoleonic Wars, boats from HMS Heureux attacked French vessels in the harbour and the batteries protecting them. The captain of Heureux was killed and one of his men was wounded. The British succeeded in destroying the guns of one of the two batteries, and in capturing a schooner.

In 1843 there was a severe earthquake. In October 1865, a cholera epidemic flared up. In Guadeloupe, from October 1865 to June 1866, 12,000 inhabitants perished. Mahault Bay was the first and worst hit by the epidemic. In 1910, the Darboussier Factory was constructed. In 1918, the TSF radio station was built.

The 1928 Okeechobee hurricane destroyed much of the town. The church and the presbytery were rebuilt in 1933. An electric generating plant was built in 1934 which supplied Guadeloupe. The Gabarre bridge and the industrial and commercial park of Jarry, the largest in Guadeloupe, were also built. The Hôtel de Ville was completed in 1991.

In 2001, Ary Chalus became mayor.

== Geography ==
Baie-Mahault (Mangrove Bay) is located in the borough called Canton and it extends a vast plain of northeastern Basse-Terre Island, where it meets Grande-Terre. A channel, navigable by smaller boats, of from 30 to 100 yards across, called Riviere Salee or Salt River separates the two islands. The Baie-Mahault area sets in marshlands and marine cul-de-sacs. The town prospered through fertile arable lands used to grow sugar cane. The mangrove swamps are a few miles east at the Salt River. Baie-Mahault is 7 km (4.3 mi) northwest of the city of Pointe-à-Pitre and 8 km (5.0 mi) west of Pointe-à-Pitre International Airport.

== Climate ==
Baie-Mahault experiences a good amount of rainfall during the year, with a wetter season between July and November which coincides with hurricane season. The town receives 1500 2000 mm of rainfall. Tropical heat brings constant highs of around 32 °C (89 °F) that drop to 20 °C (68 °F) at night. Trade winds, called alizés, blow from the northeast and often temper the climate. The hurricane season occurs from June to November.

Climate data for Baie-Mahault
Month	Jan	Feb	Mar	Apr	May	Jun	Jul	Aug	Sep	Oct	Nov	Dec	Year
Mean daily maximum °C (°F)	27 (81)	27 (81)	28 (82)	28 (82)	29 (84)	31 (88)	31 (88)	31 (88)	32 (90)	31 (88)	29 (84)	28 (82)	29 (84)
Mean daily minimum °C (°F)	22 (72)	22 (72)	23 (73)	24 (75)	24 (75)	25 (77)	25 (77)	26 (79)	26 (79)	25 (77)	24 (75)	23 (73)	23 (73)
Average rainfall mm (inches)	122 (4.8)	112 (4.4)	112 (4.4)	89 (3.5)	97 (3.8)	112 (4.4)	155 (6.1)	183 (7.2)	196 (7.7)	196 (7.7)	180 (7.1)	140 (5.5)	1,692 (66.6)
Mean monthly sunshine hours	8	8	8	9	9	8	9	9	8	9	8	8	8
Source: , BBC Weather

== Population ==
Historical population
Year	Pop.	±% p.a.
1961	7,293	—
1967	7,398	+0.24%
1974	8,348	+1.74%
1982	10,475	+2.88%
1990	15,036	+4.62%
1999	23,389	+5.03%
2007	28,379	+2.45%
2012	29,976	+1.10%
2017	30,929	+0.63%
2023	30,924	−0.00%
Source: SPLAF and INSEE (1967-2023)

== Economy ==
The town is surrounded by one major crop: sugarcane. A sugar factory is southwest of Baie-Mahault. Cane cutters cut cane and sometimes transport it by ox-cart. Southwards, are some banana and pineapple plantations. As the town sits on two bays, there is no surprise that there is a fishing port. Basse-Terre grows more crops than Grande-Terre, but has fewer people and most of them are in the primary sector.

The 300 hectares (740 acres) artisanal, commercial, and industrial park of Jarry, with more than 3,500 companies is among the very largest industrial parks of France. It accommodates the Port authority of Guadeloupe, the Complex World Trade Center (logistical center of the CCI of Pointe-à-Pitre), the oil terminals of the SARA (Société Anonyme de la Raffinerie des Antilles), and two power plants. The industrial and commercial park of Jarry-Moudong is regarded as the economic lung of the Guadeloupe with employment of more than 10,000. Jarry is ideally located between Pointe-à-Pitre International Airport and the port, and also accommodates a free zone the EEC intended for the operations of international trade for its warehouses.

== Sights ==
There are two hotels: Hotel-o-Matic in Jarry, and Villa Baie Mahault within walking distance of Baie-Mahault.

At the end of the borough, below the town hall, a landing at the edge of the lagoon, is the starting point of tours of the bay.

The shopping center of Carrefour, in Destrellan is located in Baie-Mahault, sells French imports, such as cologne, perfumes, clothing, food, etc. It is the busiest and largest supermarket zone anywhere in the Lesser Antilles, an average of between 5000 and 10,000 shoppers per day.

The main sport arena is a single velodrome, the Vélodrome Amédée Détraux, in Gourde-Liane, near Destrellan, and a stadium called Fiesque Duchesne. Artists that have performed there include Ray Charles, George Benson, Diam's, Al Jarreau, James Brown and Lionel Richie.

The industrial park of Jarry has an oil terminal, two electrical and thermal power stations for the many industrial and commercial businesses, and a logistic center for the CCI.

A sandy beach near Mahault Bay is protected by coral reefs.

On Pointe Double, you can see a lighthouse and a weather station.

A lepers' house, was operated by the Soeurs de la Charite until 1954.

== Sectors ==
The settlements depending on the commune are:

- Agathon
- Beausoleil
- Belcourt
- Bragelogne
- La Jaille
- Calvaire
- Convenance
- Moudong
- Jarry
- La Retraite
- Gourde-Liane
- Fonds Richer
- Wonche
- Destrellan
- Trioncelle
- La Retraite

== Education ==
Public preschools include:

- Ecole maternelle Bourg 2
- Ecole maternelle Lucette Irène Celani
- Ecole maternelle de Convenance
- Ecole maternelle Edinval Félix
- Ecole maternelle Rosita Kammer
- Ecole maternelle Merosier Narbal

Public elementary and primary schools include:

- Ecole primaire Louis Andrea 1
- Ecole primaire Louis Andrea 2
- Ecole primaire de Convenance
- Ecole primaire de la Jaille
- Ecole primaire Cora Mayeko
- Ecole élémentaire Bragelogne 1

Public junior high schools include:

- Collège Maurice Satineau
- Collège Gourdeliane

Public senior high schools include:

- LP Augustin Arron
- LPO Charles Coeffin

Private primary schools under contract include:

- Ecole primaire privée Massabielle II

Private secondary schools under contract:

- LP/LT Bel Air
- Collège/LP Saint-Joseph de Cluny

== Notable residents ==
- Christine Arron - Lived in the commune during her childhood.
- Francky Vincent - Very popular Guadeloupean singer, once lived in the commune.
- Johan Petro - Part-time resident
- Thomas Lemar - Footballer

== See also ==
- Communes of the Guadeloupe department
- Pointe-à-Pitre
- Les Abymes
