= Le Gosier =

- Commune
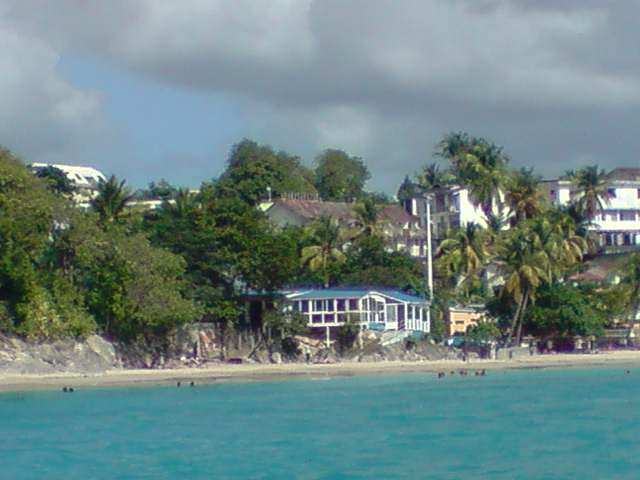
- Plage de la Datcha, Le Gosier

- Coat of arms

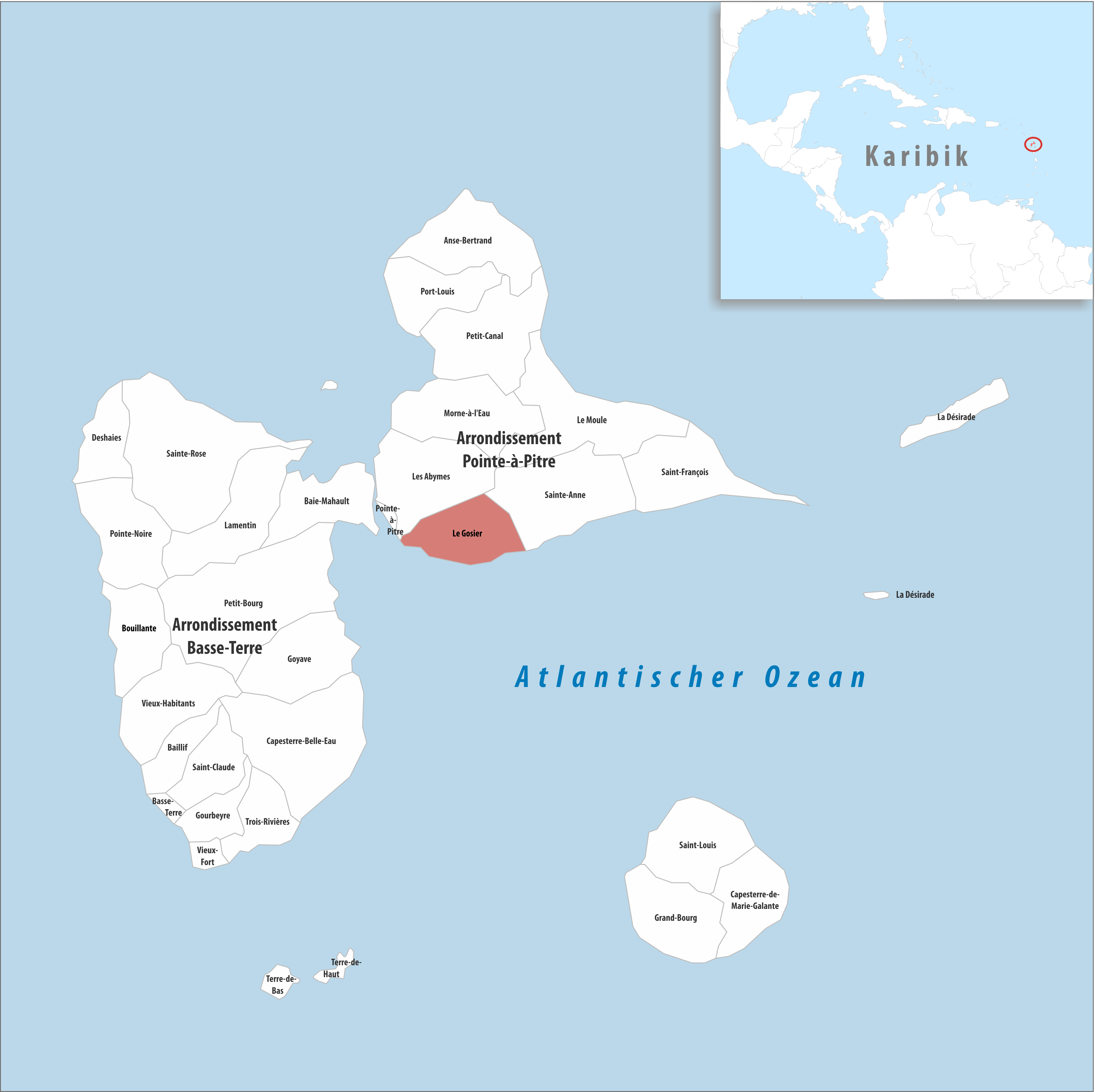
- Location of the commune (in red) within Guadeloupe
- Location of Le Gosier
- Coordinates: 16°12′22″N 61°29′39″W
- Country: France
- Overseas region and department: Guadeloupe
- Arrondissement: Pointe-à-Pitre
- Canton: Le Gosier and Les Abymes-3
- Intercommunality: CA La Riviéra du Levant

Government
  - Mayor (2024–2026): Liliane Montout
- Area^{1}: 45.20 km^{2} (17.45 sq mi)
- Population (2023): 27,757
  - Density: 614.1/km^{2} (1,590/sq mi)
- Time zone: UTC−04:00 (AST)
- INSEE/Postal code: 97113 /97190
- ^{1} French Land Register data, which excludes lakes, ponds, glaciers > 1 km^{2} (0.386 sq mi or 247 acres) and river estuaries.

Le Gosier (French pronunciation: [lə ɡozje]; Antillean Creole: Gozyé) is a commune in the French overseas region and department of Guadeloupe, in the Lesser Antilles. It is located on the south side of the island of Grande-Terre and part of the urban unit of Pointe-à-Pitre-Les Abymes, the largest conurbation in Guadeloupe.

== History ==
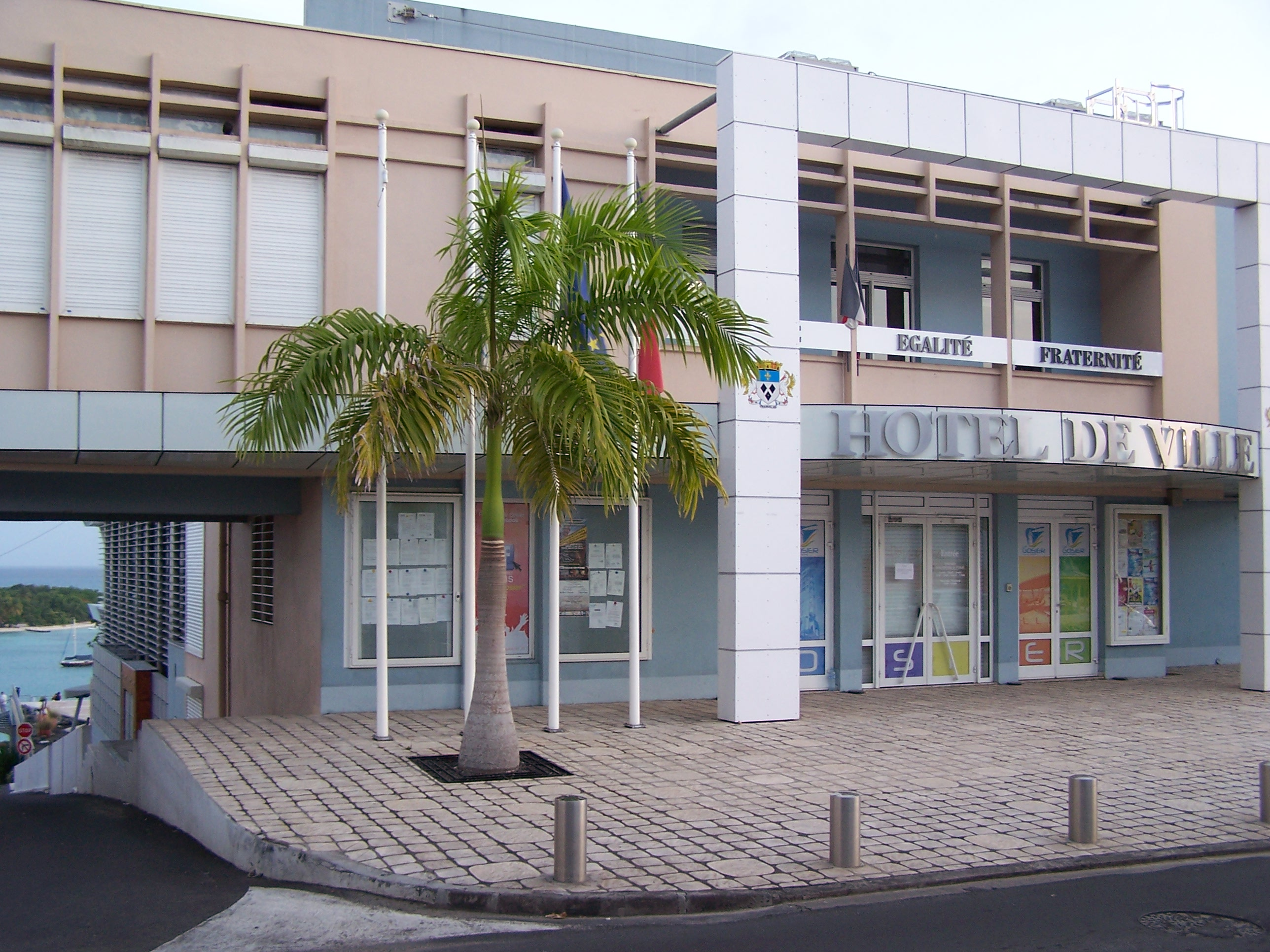
The Hôtel de Ville

The Hôtel de Ville was completed in 1931.

== Population ==
Historical population
Year	Pop.	±% p.a.
1967	13,025	—
1974	13,906	+0.94%
1982	15,381	+1.27%
1990	20,688	+3.77%
1999	25,360	+2.29%
2007	27,193	+0.88%
2012	26,613	−0.43%
2017	26,783	+0.13%
2023	27,757	+0.60%
Source: INSEE

== Education ==
Public preschools include:

- Ecole maternelle Marcel Armantine
- Ecole maternelle Maryse Pierre Justin Borel
- Ecole maternelle Alexis Eugène
- Ecole maternelle Grand Bois
- Ecole maternelle Armand Lazard

Public primary schools include:

- Ecole primaire Lazare Armand
- Ecole primaire Gillot Augustin
- Ecole primaire Marcel Georges
- Ecole primaire Lantin Germaine
- Ecole primaire Pater Hildevert
- Ecole primaire Moinet Klébert
- Ecole primaire Pliane
- Ecole primaire Jasor Saturnin
- Ecole primaire Rollon Suzanne
- Ecole primaire Thénard Turenne

Public junior high schools include:

- Collège Edmond Bambuck

Public senior high schools include:

- LDM de l'Hôtellerie et de Tourisme Archipel Guadeloupe

== Sport ==
AS Gosier is the local football club and plays in the top division of Guadeloupe, the Guadeloupe Division of Honour.

== Notable people ==
- Léopold Hélène (1926–2012), politician

== See also ==
- Communes of the Guadeloupe department
