= Ali Tur =

French architect

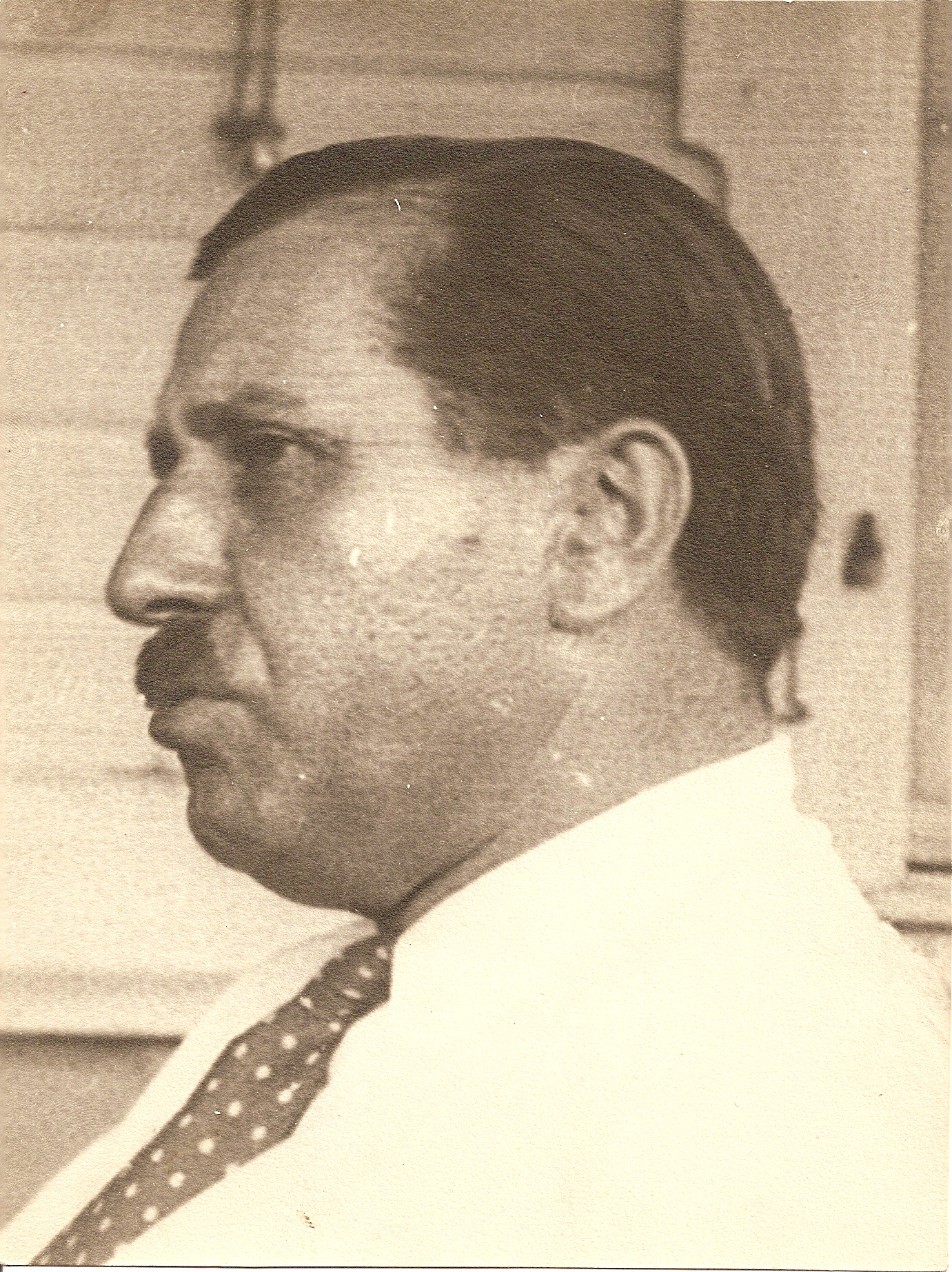
Ali Tur in 1930.

Ali Georges Tur (20 February 1889 – 26 September 1977) is a French architect. He is known for the hundreds of buildings he designed and built in Guadeloupe from 1929 to 1937 for a total amount of 72 million francs.

== Early life ==
Tur was born in Tunis (then under French protectorate). He graduated from Beaux-Arts de Paris.

== Career ==
He rebuilt much after Guadeloupe was damaged by the 1928 Okeechobee hurricane.

== Death ==
He died in the 16th arrondissement of Paris.

== Works ==
- Hôtel de Ville, Petit-Bourg (1932)
- Palace of the General Council (1935)
