= 2021 CONCACAF Gold Cup squads =

2021 football tournament

The 2021 CONCACAF Gold Cup was an international football tournament held in the United States from 10 July to 1 August 2021. The sixteen participating national teams were required to register a squad of 23 players, of which three had to be goalkeepers. Only players in these squads were eligible to take part in the tournament.

Each national team had to submit a provisional list of up to sixty players (including at least four goalkeepers) to CONCACAF no later than thirty days prior to the start of the tournament and no players could be added after the specified deadline. The final list of 23 players per national team had to be submitted to CONCACAF by 1 July 2021, ten days before the opening match of the tournament. All players in the final list had to be chosen from the respective provisional list. In the event that a player on the submitted final list suffered a serious injury or illness up to 24 hours before the kick-off of his team's first match of the tournament, that player could be replaced, provided that the team doctor and a doctor from the CONCACAF Medical Committee both confirmed that the injury or illness was severe enough to prevent the player's participation in the tournament. The replacement player had to come from the provisional list and would be assigned the shirt number of the replaced player.

The twelve national teams that participated in the qualifying stage were also required to submit their provisional and final lists within the deadlines indicated above.

CONCACAF published the provisional lists on 18 June 2021, and the final lists on 1 July 2021. On 19 July 2021, CONCACAF announced that national teams qualified for the knockout stage could replace players in case of serious injury or illness (primarily players who tested positive for SARS‑CoV‑2) confirmed by the CONCACAF Medical Committee until 24 hours before the kick-off of their quarter-finals match. The replacement players had to come from the provisional list submitted previously.

The age listed for each player is on 10 July 2021, the first day of the tournament. The numbers of caps and goals listed for each player do not include any matches played after the start of the tournament. The club listed is the club for which the player last played a competitive match before the tournament. (Note: This is the club a player was last able to play for during the previous season in the event a player did not play a competitive match.) The nationality for each club reflects the national association (not the league) to which the club is affiliated. A flag is included for coaches who are of a different nationality than their own national team.

== Group A ==
=== Mexico ===
Head coach: (Argentina) Gerardo Martino

Mexico's 60-man provisional list was announced on 18 June 2021, and was reduced to 45 players on 19 June. The final squad was announced on 1 July 2021. After the team's first group stage match, forward Hirving Lozano withdrew injured and was replaced by Rodolfo Pizarro on 21 July.

No.	Pos.	Player	Date of birth (age)	Caps	Goals	Club
1	GK	Alfredo Talavera	18 September 1982 (aged 38)	32	0	(Mexican Football Federation) Pumas UNAM
2	DF	Néstor Araujo	29 August 1991 (aged 29)	44	3	(Royal Spanish Football Federation) Celta Vigo
3	DF	Carlos Salcedo	29 September 1993 (aged 27)	42	1	(Mexican Football Federation) Tigres UANL
4	DF	Edson Álvarez	24 October 1997 (aged 23)	40	2	(Royal Dutch Football Association) Ajax
5	DF	Osvaldo Rodríguez	10 September 1996 (aged 24)	2	0	(Mexican Football Federation) León
6	MF	Jonathan dos Santos	26 April 1990 (aged 31)	52	4	(United States Soccer Federation) LA Galaxy
7	MF	Érick Sánchez	27 September 1999 (aged 21)	0	0	(Mexican Football Federation) Pachuca
8	DF	Kevin Álvarez	15 January 1999 (aged 22)	1	0	(Mexican Football Federation) Pachuca
9	FW	Alan Pulido	8 March 1991 (aged 30)	16	5	(United States Soccer Federation) Sporting Kansas City
10	MF	Orbelín Pineda	24 April 1996 (aged 25)	31	2	(Mexican Football Federation) Cruz Azul
11	FW	Rogelio Funes Mori	5 March 1991 (aged 30)	1	1	(Mexican Football Federation) Monterrey
12	GK	Rodolfo Cota	3 July 1987 (aged 34)	5	0	(Mexican Football Federation) León
13	MF	Alan Cervantes	17 January 1998 (aged 23)	1	0	(Mexican Football Federation) Santos Laguna
14	MF	Érick Gutiérrez	15 June 1995 (aged 26)	22	1	(Royal Dutch Football Association) PSV Eindhoven
15	DF	Héctor Moreno	17 January 1988 (aged 33)	113	4	(Mexican Football Federation) Monterrey
16	MF	Héctor Herrera	19 April 1990 (aged 31)	82	8	(Royal Spanish Football Federation) Atlético Madrid
17	FW	Jesús Corona	6 January 1993 (aged 28)	50	9	(Portuguese Football Federation) Porto
18	MF	Efraín Álvarez	19 June 2002 (aged 19)	2	0	(United States Soccer Federation) LA Galaxy
19	DF	Gilberto Sepúlveda	4 February 1999 (aged 22)	3	0	(Mexican Football Federation) Guadalajara
20	GK	Jonathan Orozco	12 May 1986 (aged 35)	9	0	(Mexican Football Federation) Tijuana
21	DF	Luis Rodríguez	21 January 1991 (aged 30)	27	1	(Mexican Football Federation) Tigres UANL
22	FW	Hirving Lozano (until 21 July)	30 July 1995 (aged 25)	47	14	(Italian Football Federation) Napoli
23	DF	Jesús Gallardo	15 August 1994 (aged 26)	54	0	(Mexican Football Federation) Monterrey
24	FW	Rodolfo Pizarro (from 21 July)	15 February 1994 (aged 27)	31	5	(United States Soccer Federation) Inter Miami CF

=== El Salvador ===
Head coach: (United States) Hugo Pérez

El Salvador's 32-man provisional list was announced by CONCACAF on 17 June 2021. The final squad was announced on 1 July 2021. On 7 July, defender Rómulo Villalobos withdrew injured and was replaced by Julio Sibrián.

Before the quarter-finals, on 20 July, forward David Rugamas was ruled out due to a severe flu process and was replaced by defender Miguel Lemus on 21 July.

No.	Pos.	Player	Date of birth (age)	Caps	Goals	Club
1	GK	Mario González	20 May 1997 (aged 24)	6	0	(Salvadoran Football Federation) Alianza
2	DF	Julio Sibrián	17 July 1996 (aged 24)	2	0	(Salvadoran Football Federation) Once Deportivo
3	DF	Roberto Domínguez	9 May 1997 (aged 24)	41	1	(Salvadoran Football Federation) Chalatenango
4	DF	Eriq Zavaleta	2 August 1992 (aged 28)	4	1	(Canadian Soccer Association) Toronto FC
5	DF	Ronald Gómez	22 September 1998 (aged 22)	5	0	(Salvadoran Football Federation) Águila
6	MF	Narciso Orellana	28 January 1995 (aged 26)	35	1	(Salvadoran Football Federation) Alianza
7	MF	Darwin Cerén	31 December 1989 (aged 31)	62	4	(United States Soccer Federation) Houston Dynamo FC
8	FW	Joshua Pérez	21 January 1998 (aged 23)	6	3	(Royal Spanish Football Federation) Ibiza
9	FW	Walmer Martinez	17 August 1998 (aged 22)	4	1	(United States Soccer Federation) Hartford Athletic
10	MF	Amando Moreno	10 September 1995 (aged 25)	1	0	(United States Soccer Federation) New Mexico United
11	FW	Juan Carlos Portillo	26 December 1991 (aged 29)	19	4	(Salvadoran Football Federation) Alianza
12	MF	Marvin Monterroza	3 March 1991 (aged 30)	24	2	(Salvadoran Football Federation) Alianza
13	DF	Alexander Larín	27 June 1992 (aged 29)	58	4	(National Football Federation of Guatemala) Xelajú MC
14	FW	Joaquín Rivas	26 April 1992 (aged 29)	10	1	(United States Soccer Federation) FC Tulsa
15	MF	Alex Roldan	28 July 1996 (aged 24)	0	0	(United States Soccer Federation) Seattle Sounders FC
16	FW	David Rugamas (until 20 July)	17 February 1990 (aged 31)	17	10	(Salvadoran Football Federation) Once Deportivo
16	DF	Miguel Lemus (from 21 July)	26 October 1993 (aged 27)	4	0	(Salvadoran Football Federation) Chalatenango
17	MF	Jairo Henríquez	31 August 1993 (aged 27)	7	0	(Salvadoran Football Federation) Chalatenango
18	GK	Oscar Pleitéz	6 February 1993 (aged 28)	0	0	(Salvadoran Football Federation) Isidro Metapán
19	DF	Alexis Renderos	1 June 1998 (aged 23)	2	0	(Salvadoran Football Federation) Alianza
20	MF	Isaac Portillo	8 November 1994 (aged 26)	7	0	(Salvadoran Football Federation) Alianza
21	DF	Bryan Tamacas	21 February 1995 (aged 26)	38	1	(Salvadoran Football Federation) Alianza
22	GK	Kevin Carabantes	20 March 1995 (aged 26)	2	0	(Salvadoran Football Federation) FAS
23	FW	Marvin Márquez	12 March 1998 (aged 23)	0	0	(Salvadoran Football Federation) Isidro Metapán

=== Guatemala ===
Head coach: (Mexico) Rafael Loredo

The following players were included in the Guatemala squad.

No.	Pos.	Player	Date of birth (age)	Caps	Goals	Club
1	GK	Nicholas Hagen	2 August 1996 (aged 24)	17	0	(Association of Football Federations of Azerbaijan) Sabail
2	DF	Moisés Hernández	5 March 1992 (aged 29)	25	2	(National Football Federation of Guatemala) Antigua
3	DF	Kervin García	7 December 1990 (aged 30)	3	0	(National Football Federation of Guatemala) Coban Imperial
4	DF	José Carlos Pinto (captain)	16 June 1993 (aged 28)	22	0	(National Football Federation of Guatemala) Comunicaciones
5	MF	Rudy Barrientos	1 March 1999 (aged 22)	12	2	(National Football Federation of Guatemala) Municipal
6	MF	Óscar Castellanos	18 January 2000 (aged 21)	2	0	(National Football Federation of Guatemala) Antigua
7	MF	Marvin Ceballos	22 April 1992 (aged 29)	23	6	(Mexican Football Federation) UdeG
8	MF	Luis de León	14 November 1995 (aged 25)	6	1	(National Football Federation of Guatemala) Municipal
9	MF	Yeltsin Álvarez	2 November 1994 (aged 26)	6	2	(National Football Federation of Guatemala) Municipal
10	MF	Alejandro Galindo	5 March 1992 (aged 29)	16	6	(National Football Federation of Guatemala) Coban Imperial
11	FW	Jairo Arreola	20 September 1985 (aged 35)	28	1	(National Football Federation of Guatemala) Antigua
12	GK	Kenderson Navarro	25 February 2002 (aged 19)	0	0	(National Football Federation of Guatemala) Municipal
13	DF	Stheven Robles	10 November 1995 (aged 25)	14	1	(National Football Federation of Guatemala) Comunicaciones
14	FW	Darwin Lom	14 July 1997 (aged 23)	12	6	(United States Soccer Federation) California United Strikers
15	FW	Manuel López	26 April 1990 (aged 31)	3	0	(National Football Federation of Guatemala) Municipal
16	MF	Marco Domínguez	25 February 1996 (aged 25)	6	0	(National Football Federation of Guatemala) Antigua
17	MF	Luis Martínez	14 December 1991 (aged 29)	23	7	(National Football Federation of Guatemala) Guastatoya
18	MF	Oscar Santis	25 March 1999 (aged 22)	4	1	(National Football Federation of Guatemala) Comunicaciones
19	FW	Robin Betancourth	25 November 1991 (aged 29)	12	2	(National Football Federation of Guatemala) Cobán Imperial
20	DF	Gerardo Gordillo	17 August 1994 (aged 26)	7	1	(Peruvian Football Federation) UTC
21	GK	Kevin Moscoso	13 June 1993 (aged 28)	3	0	(National Football Federation of Guatemala) Comunicaciones
22	DF	José Morales	3 December 1996 (aged 24)	0	0	(National Football Federation of Guatemala) Municipal
23	MF	Jorge Aparicio	21 November 1992 (aged 28)	23	0	(National Football Federation of Guatemala) Comunicaciones

=== Trinidad and Tobago ===
Head coach: Angus Eve

The following players were included in the Trinidad and Tobago squad.

No.	Pos.	Player	Date of birth (age)	Caps	Goals	Club
1	GK	Marvin Phillip	1 August 1984 (aged 36)	80	0	Unattached
2	DF	Aubrey David	11 October 1990 (aged 30)	59	1	(Costa Rican Football Federation) Saprissa
3	MF	Hashim Arcia	8 October 1988 (aged 32)	13	1	(Trinidad and Tobago Football Association) Defence Force
4	DF	Jelani Peters	17 December 1993 (aged 27)	0	0	(United States Soccer Federation) Pittsburgh Riverhounds
5	DF	Curtis Gonzales	26 January 1989 (aged 32)	36	0	(Trinidad and Tobago Football Association) Defence Force
6	DF	Radanfah Abu Bakr	12 February 1987 (aged 34)	37	2	Unattached
7	FW	Ryan Telfer	4 March 1994 (aged 27)	11	4	(Canadian Soccer Association) Atlético Ottawa
8	MF	Mekeil Williams	24 July 1990 (aged 30)	30	1	(United States Soccer Federation) Pittsburgh Riverhounds
9	FW	Marcus Joseph	29 April 1991 (aged 30)	17	6	(All India Football Federation) Mohammedan SC
10	MF	Kevin Molino	17 June 1990 (aged 31)	50	21	(United States Soccer Federation) Columbus Crew
11	DF	Noah Powder	27 October 1998 (aged 22)	3	0	(United States Soccer Federation) Real Salt Lake
12	FW	Isaiah Lee	21 September 1999 (aged 21)	2	0	(Trinidad and Tobago Football Association) La Horquetta Rangers
13	MF	Reon Moore	22 September 1996 (aged 24)	0	0	(Trinidad and Tobago Football Association) Defence Force
14	MF	Andre Fortune II	3 July 1996 (aged 25)	5	0	(United States Soccer Federation) Memphis 901
15	DF	Neveal Hackshaw	21 November 1995 (aged 25)	19	0	(United States Soccer Federation) Indy Eleven
16	DF	Alvin Jones	9 July 1994 (aged 27)	28	1	Unattached
17	DF	Justin Garcia	26 October 1995 (aged 25)	4	0	(Trinidad and Tobago Football Association) Defence Force
18	DF	Triston Hodge	9 October 1994 (aged 26)	17	0	(United States Soccer Federation) Colorado Springs Switchbacks
19	DF	Ross Russell	9 September 1992 (aged 28)	5	0	(Trinidad and Tobago Football Association) La Horquetta Rangers
20	MF	Duane Muckette	1 July 1995 (aged 26)	9	1	Unattached
21	GK	Nicklas Frenderup	14 December 1992 (aged 28)	4	0	(Norwegian Football Federation) Ranheim
22	GK	Adrian Foncette	10 October 1988 (aged 32)	20	0	(Trinidad and Tobago Football Association) Police
23	DF	Jesse Williams	18 May 2001 (aged 20)	1	0	(Irish Football Association) Coleraine

== Group B ==
=== United States ===
Head coach: Gregg Berhalter

The United States' 60-man provisional list was announced by CONCACAF on 17 June 2021. The final squad was announced on 1 July 2021. Before the quarter-finals, defender Walker Zimmerman, who was injured in the team's last group stage match, was replaced by Henry Kessler on 24 July.

No.	Pos.	Player	Date of birth (age)	Caps	Goals	Club
1	GK	Matt Turner	24 June 1994 (aged 27)	1	0	(United States Soccer Federation) New England Revolution
2	DF	Reggie Cannon	11 June 1998 (aged 23)	18	1	(Portuguese Football Federation) Boavista
3	DF	Sam Vines	31 May 1999 (aged 22)	3	0	(United States Soccer Federation) Colorado Rapids
4	DF	Donovan Pines	7 March 1998 (aged 23)	0	0	(United States Soccer Federation) D.C. United
5	DF	Walker Zimmerman (until 20 July)	19 May 1993 (aged 28)	14	2	(United States Soccer Federation) Nashville SC
6	MF	Gianluca Busio	29 May 2002 (aged 19)	0	0	(United States Soccer Federation) Sporting Kansas City
7	FW	Paul Arriola	5 February 1995 (aged 26)	35	8	(United States Soccer Federation) D.C. United
8	FW	Nicholas Gioacchini	25 July 2000 (aged 20)	3	2	(French Football Federation) Caen
9	FW	Gyasi Zardes	2 September 1991 (aged 29)	56	12	(United States Soccer Federation) Columbus Crew
10	MF	Cristian Roldan	3 June 1995 (aged 26)	20	0	(United States Soccer Federation) Seattle Sounders FC
11	FW	Daryl Dike	3 June 2000 (aged 21)	3	1	(United States Soccer Federation) Orlando City SC
12	DF	Miles Robinson	14 March 1997 (aged 24)	3	1	(United States Soccer Federation) Atlanta United FC
13	FW	Matthew Hoppe	13 March 2001 (aged 20)	0	0	(German Football Association) Schalke 04
14	MF	Jackson Yueill	19 March 1997 (aged 24)	12	0	(United States Soccer Federation) San Jose Earthquakes
15	FW	Jonathan Lewis	4 June 1997 (aged 24)	7	2	(United States Soccer Federation) Colorado Rapids
16	DF	James Sands	6 July 2000 (aged 21)	0	0	(United States Soccer Federation) New York City FC
17	MF	Sebastian Lletget	3 September 1992 (aged 28)	24	7	(United States Soccer Federation) LA Galaxy
18	GK	Sean Johnson	31 May 1989 (aged 32)	9	0	(United States Soccer Federation) New York City FC
19	MF	Eryk Williamson	11 June 1997 (aged 24)	0	0	(United States Soccer Federation) Portland Timbers
20	DF	Shaq Moore	2 November 1996 (aged 24)	5	0	(Royal Spanish Football Federation) Tenerife
21	DF	George Bello	22 January 2002 (aged 19)	1	0	(United States Soccer Federation) Atlanta United FC
22	GK	Brad Guzan	9 September 1984 (aged 36)	64	0	(United States Soccer Federation) Atlanta United FC
23	MF	Kellyn Acosta	24 July 1995 (aged 25)	31	2	(United States Soccer Federation) Colorado Rapids
24	DF	Henry Kessler (from 24 July)	25 June 1998 (aged 23)	0	0	(United States Soccer Federation) New England Revolution

=== Canada ===
Head coach: (England) John Herdman

Canada's 60-man provisional list was announced on 18 June 2021. The final squad was announced on 1 July 2021. On 9 July, Alphonso Davies withdrew from the squad due to injury and Cristián Gutiérrez was registered as a replacement. On 10 July 2021, Frank Sturing replaced Scott Kennedy.

Before the quarter-finals, forward Ayo Akinola was ruled out due to an injury and replaced by Tesho Akindele on 23 July.

No.	Pos.	Player	Date of birth (age)	Caps	Goals	Club
1	GK	Dayne St. Clair	9 May 1997 (aged 24)	1	0	(United States Soccer Federation) Minnesota United FC
2	DF	Alistair Johnston	8 October 1998 (aged 22)	5	1	(United States Soccer Federation) Nashville SC
3	FW	Tyler Pasher	27 April 1994 (aged 27)	0	0	(United States Soccer Federation) Houston Dynamo FC
4	DF	Kamal Miller	16 May 1997 (aged 24)	6	0	(Canadian Soccer Association) CF Montréal
5	DF	Steven Vitória	11 January 1987 (aged 34)	18	2	(Portuguese Football Federation) Moreirense
6	MF	Samuel Piette	12 November 1994 (aged 26)	53	0	(Canadian Soccer Association) CF Montréal
7	MF	Stephen Eustáquio	21 December 1996 (aged 24)	6	0	(Portuguese Football Federation) Paços Ferreira
8	MF	Liam Fraser	13 February 1998 (aged 23)	5	0	(United States Soccer Federation) Columbus Crew
9	FW	Lucas Cavallini	28 December 1992 (aged 28)	22	16	(Canadian Soccer Association) Vancouver Whitecaps FC
10	FW	Junior Hoilett	5 June 1990 (aged 31)	31	11	(Football Association of Wales) Cardiff City
11	FW	Theo Corbeanu	17 May 2002 (aged 19)	3	1	(The Football Association) Wolverhampton Wanderers
12	FW	Tajon Buchanan	8 February 1999 (aged 22)	4	0	(United States Soccer Federation) New England Revolution
13	DF	Frank Sturing	29 May 1997 (aged 24)	2	1	(Royal Dutch Football Association) Den Bosch
14	MF	Mark-Anthony Kaye	2 December 1994 (aged 26)	19	2	(United States Soccer Federation) Los Angeles FC
15	DF	Doneil Henry	20 April 1993 (aged 28)	34	1	(Korea Football Association) Suwon Samsung Bluewings
16	GK	Maxime Crépeau	11 May 1994 (aged 27)	6	0	(Canadian Soccer Association) Vancouver Whitecaps FC
17	FW	Cyle Larin	17 April 1995 (aged 26)	37	15	(Turkish Football Federation) Beşiktaş
18	GK	Jayson Leutwiler	25 April 1989 (aged 32)	3	0	(The Football Association) Huddersfield Town
19	MF	Harry Paton	23 May 1998 (aged 23)	0	0	(Scottish Football Association) Ross County
20	FW	Ayo Akinola (until 20 July)	20 January 2000 (aged 21)	0	0	(Canadian Soccer Association) Toronto FC
21	MF	Jonathan Osorio	12 June 1992 (aged 29)	37	5	(Canadian Soccer Association) Toronto FC
22	DF	Richie Laryea	7 January 1995 (aged 26)	10	1	(Canadian Soccer Association) Toronto FC
23	DF	Cristián Gutiérrez	18 February 1997 (aged 24)	0	0	(Canadian Soccer Association) Vancouver Whitecaps FC
24	FW	Tesho Akindele (from 23 July)	31 March 1992 (aged 29)	17	3	(United States Soccer Federation) Orlando City SC

=== Martinique ===
Head coach: Mario Bocaly

Martinique's 35-man provisional list was announced by CONCACAF on 17 June 2021. The final squad was announced on 1 July 2021.

No.	Pos.	Player	Date of birth (age)	Caps	Goals	Club
1	GK	Loïc Chauvet	30 April 1988 (aged 33)	21	0	(Ligue de football de la Martinique) Golden Lion
2	DF	Florian Goma	21 January 2001 (aged 20)	0	0	(Ligue de football de la Martinique) Samaritaine
3	MF	Ambroise Félicitet	29 May 1993 (aged 28)	1	0	(Ligue de football de la Martinique) Aiglon
4	DF	Gérald Dondon	4 October 1986 (aged 34)	16	2	(Ligue de football de la Martinique) Club Franciscain
5	MF	Karl Vitulin	15 January 1991 (aged 30)	51	2	(Ligue de football de la Martinique) Samaritaine
6	DF	Jean-Sylvain Babin	14 October 1986 (aged 34)	14	1	(Royal Spanish Football Federation) Sporting Gijón
7	FW	Grégory Pastel	18 September 1990 (aged 30)	17	3	(Ligue de football de la Martinique) RC Rivière-Pilote
8	DF	Yann Thimon	1 January 1990 (aged 31)	16	1	(Ligue de football de la Martinique) Golden Lion
9	FW	Enrick Reuperné	3 August 1998 (aged 22)	1	0	(Ligue de football de la Martinique) Aiglon
10	FW	Kévin Fortuné	6 August 1989 (aged 31)	7	1	(French Football Federation) Auxerre
11	FW	Emmanuel Rivière	3 March 1990 (aged 31)	2	1	(Italian Football Federation) Crotone
12	FW	Johnny Marajo	21 October 1993 (aged 27)	19	1	(Ligue de football de la Martinique) Club Franciscain
13	FW	Christophe Jougon	10 July 1995 (aged 26)	26	1	(Ligue de football de la Martinique) Club Franciscain
14	MF	Norman Grelet	14 July 1993 (aged 27)	2	0	(Ligue de football de la Martinique) Golden Lion
15	DF	Yordan Thimon	10 September 1996 (aged 24)	9	0	(Ligue de football de la Martinique) Club Franciscain
16	GK	Arnaud Huyghues des Etages	30 December 1985 (aged 35)	2	0	(Ligue de football de la Martinique) Aiglon
17	FW	Patrick Burner	11 April 1996 (aged 25)	0	0	(French Football Federation) Nîmes
18	DF	Samuel Camille	2 February 1986 (aged 35)	5	0	(French Football Federation) Olympique Valence
19	MF	Daniel Hérelle	17 October 1988 (aged 32)	78	3	(Ligue de football de la Martinique) Samaritaine
20	MF	Stéphane Abaul	23 November 1991 (aged 29)	57	9	(Ligue de football de la Martinique) Club Franciscain
21	DF	Sébastien Crétinoir (captain)	12 February 1986 (aged 35)	63	3	(Ligue de football de la Martinique) Samaritaine
22	MF	Romario Barthéléry	24 June 1994 (aged 27)	8	0	(Ligue de football de la Martinique) Golden Lion
23	GK	Gilles Meslien	17 June 1989 (aged 32)	1	0	(Ligue de football de la Martinique) Golden Lion

=== Haiti ===
Head coach: Jean-Jacques Pierre

The following players were included in the Haiti squad for 2021 CONCACAF Gold Cup qualification.

No.	Pos.	Player	Date of birth (age)	Caps	Goals	Club
1	GK	Brian Sylvestre	19 December 1992 (aged 28)	0	0	(United States Soccer Federation) Miami FC
2	DF	Carlens Arcus	28 June 1996 (aged 25)	20	1	(French Football Federation) Auxerre
3	DF	Francois Dulysse	13 April 1999 (aged 22)	0	0	(United States Soccer Federation) New England Revolution II
4	DF	Ricardo Adé (captain)	21 May 1990 (aged 31)	17	1	(Ecuadorian Football Federation) Mushuc Runa
5	DF	Stéphane Lambese	10 May 1995 (aged 26)	8	0	(French Football Federation) Orléans
6	DF	Jems Geffrard	26 August 1994 (aged 26)	19	0	(Canadian Soccer Association) HFX Wanderers
7	FW	Carnejy Antoine	27 July 1991 (aged 29)	1	2	(French Football Federation) Orléans
8	MF	Zachary Herivaux	1 February 1996 (aged 25)	17	0	(United States Soccer Federation) Birmingham Legion
9	FW	Duckens Nazon	17 April 1994 (aged 27)	44	23	(Royal Belgian Football Association) Sint-Truiden
10	MF	Derrick Etienne Jr.	25 November 1996 (aged 24)	25	3	(United States Soccer Federation) Columbus Crew
11	FW	Roberto Louima	4 March 1997 (aged 24)	4	0	(Haitian Football Federation) Violette
12	GK	Josué Duverger	27 April 2000 (aged 21)	1	0	(Portuguese Football Federation) Vitória de Setúbal
13	DF	Kevin Lafrance	13 January 1990 (aged 31)	39	5	(Cyprus Football Association) AEK Larnaca
14	MF	Leverton Pierre	9 March 1998 (aged 23)	0	0	(French Football Federation) USL Dunkerque
15	MF	Dutherson Clerveaux	20 January 1999 (aged 22)	1	0	(Haitian Football Federation) Cavaly
16	FW	Louicius Don Deedson	11 February 2001 (aged 20)	2	0	(Danish Football Association) Hobro
17	DF	Martin Expérience	9 March 1999 (aged 22)	0	0	(French Football Federation) Avranches
18	FW	Ronaldo Damus	12 September 1999 (aged 21)	2	0	(United States Soccer Federation) Orange County SC
19	MF	Steeven Saba	24 February 1993 (aged 28)	14	1	(Haitian Football Federation) Violette
20	FW	Frantzdy Pierrot	29 March 1995 (aged 26)	17	10	(French Football Federation) Guingamp
21	MF	Bryan Alceus	1 February 1996 (aged 25)	22	0	(Romanian Football Federation) Gaz Metan Mediaș
22	DF	Alex Junior Christian	12 May 1993 (aged 28)	29	0	(Kazakhstan Football Federation) Atyrau
23	GK	Isaac Rouaud	12 February 1998 (aged 23)	0	0	(French Football Federation) J3S Amilly

== Group C ==
=== Costa Rica ===
Head coach: (Colombia) Luis Fernando Suárez

Costa Rica's 60-man provisional list was announced by CONCACAF on 17 June 2021, and was reduced to 27 players on 25 June upon the arrival of new coach Luis Fernando Suárez. The final squad was announced on 1 July 2021. On 5 and 7 July, midfielder Yeltsin Tejeda and defender Bryan Oviedo were withdrawn due to injuries and replaced by Jefferson Brenes and Luis Díaz respectively.

Before the quarter-finals, goalkeeper Patrick Sequeira was ruled out due to an injury and replaced by Kevin Briceño on 21 July.

No.	Pos.	Player	Date of birth (age)	Caps	Goals	Club
1	GK	Esteban Alvarado	28 April 1989 (aged 32)	19	0	(Costa Rican Football Federation) Herediano
2	DF	Yael López	17 December 1998 (aged 22)	0	0	(Costa Rican Football Federation) Herediano
3	DF	Giancarlo González	8 February 1988 (aged 33)	84	2	(United States Soccer Federation) LA Galaxy
4	DF	Keysher Fuller	12 July 1994 (aged 26)	13	1	(Costa Rican Football Federation) Herediano
5	MF	Celso Borges	27 May 1988 (aged 33)	134	23	(Royal Spanish Football Federation) Deportivo La Coruña
6	DF	Óscar Duarte	3 June 1989 (aged 32)	57	2	(Royal Spanish Football Federation) Levante
7	MF	Johan Venegas	27 November 1988 (aged 32)	63	11	(Costa Rican Football Federation) Alajuelense
8	MF	Luis Díaz	6 December 1998 (aged 22)	4	0	(United States Soccer Federation) Columbus Crew
9	FW	Ariel Rodríguez	27 September 1989 (aged 31)	3	2	(Costa Rican Football Federation) Saprissa
10	MF	Bryan Ruiz	18 August 1985 (aged 35)	129	26	(Costa Rican Football Federation) Alajuelense
11	MF	Ariel Lassiter	27 September 1994 (aged 26)	12	0	(United States Soccer Federation) Houston Dynamo FC
12	FW	Joel Campbell	26 June 1992 (aged 29)	99	19	(Mexican Football Federation) León
13	MF	Allan Cruz	24 February 1996 (aged 25)	22	2	(United States Soccer Federation) FC Cincinnati
14	MF	Jimmy Marín	8 October 1997 (aged 23)	3	0	(Costa Rican Football Federation) Saprissa
15	DF	Francisco Calvo	8 July 1992 (aged 29)	56	7	(United States Soccer Federation) Chicago Fire FC
16	MF	Alonso Martínez	15 October 1998 (aged 22)	2	0	(Costa Rican Football Federation) Alajuelense
17	MF	Jefferson Brenes	13 April 1997 (aged 24)	1	0	(Costa Rican Football Federation) Herediano
18	GK	Patrick Sequeira (until 21 July)	1 March 1999 (aged 22)	0	0	(Royal Spanish Football Federation) Real Unión
19	DF	Kendall Waston	1 January 1988 (aged 33)	45	7	(Costa Rican Football Federation) Saprissa
20	MF	David Guzmán	18 February 1990 (aged 31)	56	0	(Costa Rican Football Federation) Saprissa
21	FW	José Guillermo Ortiz	20 June 1992 (aged 29)	13	3	(Colombian Football Federation) Deportes Tolima
22	DF	Rónald Matarrita	9 July 1994 (aged 27)	37	3	(United States Soccer Federation) FC Cincinnati
23	GK	Leonel Moreira	2 April 1990 (aged 31)	18	0	(Costa Rican Football Federation) Alajuelense
24	GK	Kevin Briceño (from 21 July)	21 October 1991 (aged 29)	1	0	(Costa Rican Football Federation) Cartaginés

=== Jamaica ===
Head coach: Theodore Whitmore

Jamaica's 60-man provisional list was announced on 19 June 2021. The final squad was announced on 1 July 2021. On 8 July, forward Javon East, withdrew injured and was replaced by Andre Gray.

No.	Pos.	Player	Date of birth (age)	Caps	Goals	Club
1	GK	Andre Blake	21 November 1990 (aged 30)	45	0	(United States Soccer Federation) Philadelphia Union
2	MF	Lamar Walker	5 December 1999 (aged 21)	6	1	(United States Soccer Federation) Miami FC
3	DF	Michael Hector	19 July 1992 (aged 28)	33	0	(The Football Association) Fulham
4	DF	Amari'i Bell	5 May 1994 (aged 27)	2	0	(The Football Association) Luton Town
5	DF	Alvas Powell	18 July 1994 (aged 26)	49	2	(United States Soccer Federation) Philadelphia Union
6	DF	Liam Moore	31 January 1993 (aged 28)	2	0	(The Football Association) Reading
7	FW	Leon Bailey	9 August 1997 (aged 23)	8	1	(German Football Association) Bayer Leverkusen
8	DF	Oniel Fisher	22 November 1991 (aged 29)	16	0	(United States Soccer Federation) LA Galaxy
9	FW	Cory Burke	28 December 1991 (aged 29)	16	6	(United States Soccer Federation) Philadelphia Union
10	FW	Bobby De Cordova-Reid	2 February 1993 (aged 28)	6	1	(The Football Association) Fulham
11	FW	Shamar Nicholson	16 February 1997 (aged 24)	18	7	(Royal Belgian Football Association) Charleroi
12	MF	Junior Flemmings	16 January 1996 (aged 25)	10	1	(United States Soccer Federation) Birmingham Legion
13	GK	Dillon Barnes	8 April 1996 (aged 25)	0	0	(The Football Association) Queens Park Rangers
14	FW	Andre Gray	26 June 1991 (aged 30)	2	1	(The Football Association) Watford
15	FW	Blair Turgott	22 May 1994 (aged 27)	1	0	(Swedish Football Association) Östersund
16	MF	Daniel Johnson	8 October 1992 (aged 28)	2	1	(The Football Association) Preston North End
17	DF	Damion Lowe	5 May 1993 (aged 28)	25	2	(Egyptian Football Association) Al-Ittihad
18	MF	Ravel Morrison	2 February 1993 (aged 28)	3	0	Unattached
19	DF	Adrian Mariappa	3 October 1986 (aged 34)	51	1	Unattached
20	DF	Kemar Lawrence	17 September 1992 (aged 28)	60	3	(Canadian Soccer Association) Toronto FC
21	MF	Tyreek Magee	27 August 1999 (aged 21)	4	0	(Royal Belgian Football Association) Eupen
22	MF	Devon Williams	8 April 1992 (aged 29)	13	1	(United States Soccer Federation) Miami FC
23	GK	Dennis Taylor	21 January 1991 (aged 30)	2	0	(Jamaica Football Federation) Humble Lions

=== Suriname ===
Head coach: Dean Gorré

Suriname's 36-man provisional list was announced by CONCACAF on 17 June 2021. The final squad was announced on 25 June.

No.	Pos.	Player	Date of birth (age)	Caps	Goals	Club
1	GK	Warner Hahn	15 June 1992 (aged 29)	4	0	Unattached
2	DF	Damil Dankerlui	24 August 1996 (aged 24)	3	0	(Royal Dutch Football Association) Groningen
3	DF	Sean Klaiber	31 July 1994 (aged 26)	0	0	(Royal Dutch Football Association) Ajax
4	DF	Dion Malone	13 February 1989 (aged 32)	3	0	(Royal Dutch Football Association) NAC Breda
5	DF	Ridgeciano Haps	12 June 1993 (aged 28)	2	0	(Royal Dutch Football Association) Feyenoord
6	MF	Ryan Koolwijk	8 August 1985 (aged 35)	2	0	(Royal Dutch Football Association) Almere City
7	FW	Florian Jozefzoon	9 February 1991 (aged 30)	3	1	(The Football Association) Rotherham United
8	MF	Roland Alberg	6 August 1990 (aged 30)	2	1	(All India Football Federation) Hyderabad
9	FW	Nigel Hasselbaink	21 November 1990 (aged 30)	6	7	(Israel Football Association) Bnei Sakhnin
10	FW	Alvaro Verwey	12 January 1999 (aged 22)	3	1	(Surinamese Football Association) Transvaal
11	FW	Sheraldo Becker	9 February 1995 (aged 26)	2	2	(German Football Association) Union Berlin
12	DF	Albert Nibte	20 May 1993 (aged 28)	14	0	(Surinamese Football Association) Leo Victor
13	GK	Claidel Kohinor	7 February 1992 (aged 29)	21	0	(Surinamese Football Association) Robinhood
14	DF	Sersinho Eduard	4 September 1994 (aged 26)	24	1	(Surinamese Football Association) Inter Moengotapoe
15	DF	Ryan Donk (captain)	30 March 1986 (aged 35)	4	1	(Turkish Football Federation) Galatasaray
16	MF	Mitchell Donald	10 December 1988 (aged 32)	1	0	(Turkish Football Federation) BB Erzurumspor
17	FW	Dimitrie Apai	19 July 1994 (aged 26)	24	4	(Trinidad and Tobago Football Association) W Connection
18	MF	Kelvin Leerdam	24 June 1990 (aged 31)	4	0	(United States Soccer Federation) Inter Miami CF
19	DF	Anduelo Amoeferie	24 September 1991 (aged 29)	13	0	(Surinamese Football Association) Inter Moengotapoe
20	FW	Gleofilo Vlijter	17 September 1999 (aged 21)	9	11	(Israel Football Association) Beitar Jerusalem
21	MF	Diego Biseswar	8 March 1988 (aged 33)	3	0	(Cyprus Football Association) Apollon Limassol
22	FW	Ivenzo Comvalius	24 June 1997 (aged 24)	15	8	(Croatian Football Federation) Dugopolje
23	GK	Ishan Kort	1 June 2000 (aged 21)	1	0	(Royal Dutch Football Association) Almere U21

=== Guadeloupe ===
Head coach: Jocelyn Angloma

The following players were included in the Guadeloupe squad for 2021 CONCACAF Gold Cup qualification.

No.	Pos.	Player	Date of birth (age)	Caps	Goals	Club
1	GK	Frédéric Tejou	13 July 1987 (aged 33)	4	0	(Ligue guadeloupéenne de football) La Gauloise
2	DF	Kévin Moeson	30 September 1997 (aged 23)	4	0	(Ligue guadeloupéenne de football) Solidarité-Scolaire
3	DF	Kelly Irep	1 September 1995 (aged 25)	2	0	(Cyprus Football Association) Enonis
4	DF	Ronan Hauterville	21 November 1989 (aged 31)	6	0	(Ligue guadeloupéenne de football) Phare Petit-Canal
5	DF	Steve Solvet	29 March 1996 (aged 25)	0	0	(French Football Federation) Sète
6	MF	Quentin Annette	13 January 1998 (aged 23)	4	0	(Ligue de football de la Martinique) Club Franciscain
7	MF	Mavrick Annerose	29 November 1995 (aged 25)	4	0	(Ligue guadeloupéenne de football) USR Saint Rose
8	MF	Kévin Malpon	1 March 1996 (aged 25)	2	0	(Ligue guadeloupéenne de football) Gosier
9	FW	Raphaël Mirval	4 May 1996 (aged 25)	9	7	(Ligue guadeloupéenne de football) Solidarité-Scolaire
10	FW	Matthias Phaëton	8 January 2000 (aged 21)	0	0	(French Football Federation) Guingamp
11	FW	Skeveen Romage	22 December 1997 (aged 23)	0	0	(Ligue guadeloupéenne de football) USBM
12	DF	Mickaël Alphonse	12 July 1989 (aged 31)	5	0	(French Football Federation) Amiens
13	MF	Morgan Saint-Maximin	2 August 1997 (aged 23)	0	0	(Ligue guadeloupéenne de football) Solidarité-Scolaire
14	FW	Vikash Tillé	26 November 1997 (aged 23)	4	1	(Ligue guadeloupéenne de football) CS Moulien
15	MF	Dimitri Cavaré	5 February 1995 (aged 26)	1	0	(Swiss Football Association) Sion
16	GK	Kévin Ajax	31 August 1987 (aged 33)	7	0	(Ligue guadeloupéenne de football) CS Moulien
17	DF	Anthony Baron	29 December 1992 (aged 28)	2	0	(Swiss Football Association) Stade Nyonnais
18	DF	Thomas Pineau	31 January 1991 (aged 30)	0	0	(Ligue guadeloupéenne de football) Solidarité-Scolaire
19	FW	Luther Archimède	17 September 1999 (aged 21)	1	0	(United States Soccer Federation) New York Red Bulls II
20	MF	Stevenson Casimir	3 June 1992 (aged 29)	2	0	(Ligue guadeloupéenne de football) La Gauloise
21	DF	Colman Makouké	7 June 1990 (aged 31)	1	0	(Ligue guadeloupéenne de football) Phare Petit-Canal
22	FW	Dimitri Ramothe	8 September 1990 (aged 30)	4	3	(Ligue guadeloupéenne de football) ACMG
23	GK	Yohann Thuram-Ulien	31 October 1988 (aged 32)	4	0	(French Football Federation) Amiens

== Group D ==
=== Honduras ===
Head coach: (Uruguay) Fabián Coito

Honduras's 56-man provisional list was announced by CONCACAF on 17 June 2021. The final squad was announced on 30 June 2021. On 9 July, Éver Alvarado withdrew due to injury, and was replaced by Raúl Santos. On 12 July, Michaell Chirinos withdrew due to injury and was replaced by Franklin Flores. On 19 July 2021, Kevin López replaced Alberth Elis due to injury. On 21 July 2021, Roger Rojas replaced Carlos Fernández due to positive test for SARS-CoV-2.

No.	Pos.	Player	Date of birth (age)	Caps	Goals	Club
1	GK	Edrick Menjívar	1 March 1993 (aged 28)	3	0	(National Autonomous Federation of Football of Honduras) Olimpia
2	DF	Félix Crisanto	9 September 1990 (aged 30)	21	0	Unattached
3	DF	Maynor Figueroa (captain)	2 May 1983 (aged 38)	168	5	(United States Soccer Federation) Houston Dynamo FC
4	DF	Marcelo Pereira	27 May 1995 (aged 26)	17	0	(National Autonomous Federation of Football of Honduras) Motagua
5	DF	Raúl Santos	2 August 1992 (aged 28)	2	0	(National Autonomous Federation of Football of Honduras) Motagua
6	MF	Bryan Acosta	24 November 1993 (aged 27)	48	2	(United States Soccer Federation) FC Dallas
7	FW	Alberth Elis (until 19 July)	12 February 1996 (aged 25)	46	11	(Portuguese Football Federation) Boavista
8	MF	Walter Martínez	26 March 1991 (aged 30)	5	0	(National Autonomous Federation of Football of Honduras) Motagua
9	FW	Carlos Fernández (until 21 July)	17 February 1992 (aged 29)	0	0	(Uruguayan Football Association) Fénix
10	MF	Alexander López	5 June 1992 (aged 29)	37	4	(Costa Rican Football Federation) Alajuelense
11	FW	Jerry Bengtson	8 April 1987 (aged 34)	59	21	(National Autonomous Federation of Football of Honduras) Olimpia
12	FW	Romell Quioto	9 August 1991 (aged 29)	47	8	(Canadian Soccer Association) CF Montréal
13	MF	Jhow Benavídez	26 December 1995 (aged 25)	6	0	(National Autonomous Federation of Football of Honduras) Real España
14	MF	Boniek García	4 September 1984 (aged 36)	128	3	(United States Soccer Federation) Houston Dynamo FC
15	MF	Juan Delgado	21 July 1992 (aged 28)	0	0	(National Autonomous Federation of Football of Honduras) Motagua
16	DF	Johnny Leverón	7 February 1990 (aged 31)	37	3	(National Autonomous Federation of Football of Honduras) Olimpia
17	DF	Franklin Flores	18 April 1996 (aged 25)	1	0	(National Autonomous Federation of Football of Honduras) Real España
18	GK	Marlon Licona	9 February 1991 (aged 30)	0	0	(National Autonomous Federation of Football of Honduras) Motagua
19	FW	Edwin Solano	25 January 1996 (aged 25)	4	0	(National Autonomous Federation of Football of Honduras) Marathón
20	MF	Deybi Flores	16 June 1996 (aged 25)	9	0	(National Autonomous Federation of Football of Honduras) Olimpia
21	DF	Kevin Álvarez	3 August 1996 (aged 24)	6	0	(Swedish Football Association) IFK Norrköping
22	GK	Luis López	13 September 1993 (aged 27)	31	0	(National Autonomous Federation of Football of Honduras) Real España
23	DF	Diego Rodríguez	6 November 1995 (aged 25)	5	1	(National Autonomous Federation of Football of Honduras) Motagua
24	FW	Roger Rojas (from 21 July)	9 June 1990 (aged 31)	32	3	(Costa Rican Football Federation) Cartaginés
25	MF	Kevin López (from 19 July)	3 February 1996 (aged 25)	3	0	(National Autonomous Federation of Football of Honduras) Motagua

=== Panama ===
Head coach: (Spain) Thomas Christiansen

Panama's 47–man provisional list was announced by CONCACAF on 17 June 2021, and was reduced to 25 players on 25 June. The final squad was announced on 1 July 2021. On 6 July 2021, Cecilio Waterman was replaced by Rolando Blackburn due to positive test on SARS-CoV-2. On 8 July 2021, Aníbal Godoy and Andrés Andrade were withdrawn due to injuries and replaced by Abdiel Ayarza and Roderick Miller.

No.	Pos.	Player	Date of birth (age)	Caps	Goals	Club
1	GK	Luis Mejía	16 March 1991 (aged 30)	30	0	(Uruguayan Football Association) Fénix
2	DF	Francisco Palacios	10 December 1990 (aged 30)	15	1	(Panamanian Football Federation) San Francisco
3	DF	Harold Cummings (captain)	1 March 1992 (aged 29)	73	1	(Bolivian Football Federation) Always Ready
4	DF	Omar Córdoba	13 June 1994 (aged 27)	1	0	(Panamanian Football Federation) Independiente
5	DF	Richard Peralta	20 September 1993 (aged 27)	8	0	(Panamanian Football Federation) Tauro
6	MF	Víctor Griffith	12 December 2000 (aged 20)	8	0	(Panamanian Football Federation) Árabe Unido
7	MF	José Luis Rodríguez	19 June 1998 (aged 23)	23	0	(Royal Spanish Football Federation) Lugo
8	MF	Adalberto Carrasquilla	28 November 1998 (aged 22)	15	1	(Royal Spanish Football Federation) Cartagena
9	FW	Gabriel Torres	31 October 1988 (aged 32)	94	22	(Mexican Football Federation) Pumas UNAM
10	MF	Yoel Bárcenas	23 October 1993 (aged 27)	48	2	(Royal Spanish Football Federation) Girona
11	MF	Armando Cooper	26 November 1987 (aged 33)	116	10	(Israel Football Association) Maccabi Petah Tikva
12	GK	José Calderón	14 August 1985 (aged 35)	40	0	(National Football Federation of Guatemala) Cobán Imperial
13	DF	Adolfo Machado	14 February 1985 (aged 36)	90	2	(Costa Rican Football Federation) San Carlos
14	FW	Rolando Blackburn	9 January 1990 (aged 31)	37	6	(Bolivian Football Federation) The Strongest
15	DF	Eric Davis	31 March 1991 (aged 30)	56	1	(Slovak Football Association) DAC Dunajská Streda
16	DF	Roderick Miller	3 April 1992 (aged 29)	26	1	(Peruvian Football Federation) Carlos Stein
17	FW	José Fajardo	18 August 1993 (aged 27)	17	3	(Ecuadorian Football Federation) 9 de Octubre
18	FW	Jorman Aguilar	11 September 1994 (aged 26)	7	1	(Costa Rican Football Federation) San Carlos
19	MF	Alberto Quintero	18 December 1987 (aged 33)	105	6	(Peruvian Football Federation) Universitario
20	MF	Abdiel Ayarza	12 September 1992 (aged 28)	11	2	(Peruvian Football Federation) Cienciano
21	MF	César Yanis	28 January 1996 (aged 25)	13	0	(Panamanian Football Federation) Deportivo del Este
22	GK	Orlando Mosquera	25 December 1994 (aged 26)	4	0	(Turkish Football Federation) Boluspor
23	MF	Miguel Camargo	5 September 1993 (aged 27)	30	2	(Colombian Football Federation) Independiente Medellín

=== Grenada ===
Head coach: (Canada) Michael Findlay

Grenada's 59-man provisional list was announced by CONCACAF on 17 June 2021. The final squad was announced on 1 July 2021.

No.	Pos.	Player	Date of birth (age)	Caps	Goals	Club
1	GK	Jason Belfon	3 July 1990 (aged 31)	43	0	(Grenada Football Association) Paradise
2	FW	Benjamin Ettienne	13 March 2003 (aged 18)	2	0	(Grenada Football Association) Queens Park Rangers SC
3	DF	Kwesi Paul	7 November 1994 (aged 26)	2	0	(United States Soccer Federation) Peachtree City
4	DF	Aaron Pierre (captain)	17 February 1993 (aged 28)	12	1	(The Football Association) Shrewsbury Town
5	DF	Omar Beckles	25 October 1991 (aged 29)	4	0	(The Football Association) Leyton Orient
6	MF	Oliver Norburn	26 October 1992 (aged 28)	0	0	(The Football Association) Shrewsbury Town
7	MF	Romar Frank	28 September 1996 (aged 24)	12	0	(Grenada Football Association) Camerhogne
8	MF	Alexander McQueen	24 March 1995 (aged 26)	8	0	(The Football Association) Barnet
9	FW	Kairo Mitchell	21 October 1997 (aged 23)	13	2	(The Football Association) Chesterfield
10	FW	Saydrel Lewis	27 November 1997 (aged 23)	22	7	(Grenada Football Association) Paradise
11	MF	Shavon John-Brown	13 April 1995 (aged 26)	27	4	(United States Soccer Federation) New Amsterdam
12	GK	Reice Charles-Cook	8 April 1994 (aged 27)	1	0	(The Football Association) Welling United
13	FW	Regan Charles-Cook	14 February 1997 (aged 24)	0	0	(Scottish Football Association) Ross County
14	FW	Dejon Noel-Williams	22 September 1998 (aged 22)	2	0	(Royal Spanish Football Federation) Guadalajara
15	FW	Ricky German	13 January 1999 (aged 22)	2	0	(The Football Association) Crawley Town
16	DF	Arthur Paterson	31 January 1996 (aged 25)	11	4	(United States Soccer Federation) Charleston Battery
17	DF	Tyrone Sterling	8 October 1987 (aged 33)	8	0	(The Football Association) Concord Rangers
18	DF	Kraig Noel-McLeod	11 December 1999 (aged 21)	8	0	Unattached
19	MF	Kwazim Theodore	12 January 1996 (aged 25)	29	1	(Grenada Football Association) St. David's FC
20	FW	Jacob Berkeley-Agyepong	27 March 1997 (aged 24)	0	0	(The Football Association) Dartford
21	MF	Josh Gabriel	30 November 1999 (aged 21)	6	0	Unattached
22	GK	Trishawn Thomas	25 January 2003 (aged 18)	0	0	(Grenada Football Association) Queens Park Rangers SC
23	FW	Jamal Charles	24 November 1995 (aged 25)	25	14	(Grenada Football Association) Paradise

=== Qatar ===
Head coach: (Spain) Félix Sánchez

Qatar's 60-man provisional list was announced by CONCACAF on 17 June 2021. The final squad was announced on 1 July.

No.	Pos.	Player	Date of birth (age)	Caps	Goals	Club
1	GK	Saad Al-Sheeb	19 February 1990 (aged 31)	75	0	(Qatar Football Association) Al-Sadd
2	DF	Pedro Miguel	6 August 1990 (aged 30)	63	1	(Qatar Football Association) Al-Sadd
3	DF	Abdelkarim Hassan	28 August 1993 (aged 27)	103	14	(Qatar Football Association) Al-Sadd
4	MF	Mohammed Waad	18 September 1999 (aged 21)	6	0	(Qatar Football Association) Al-Sadd
5	DF	Tarek Salman	5 December 1997 (aged 23)	39	0	(Qatar Football Association) Al-Sadd
6	MF	Abdulaziz Hatem	28 October 1990 (aged 30)	79	6	(Qatar Football Association) Al-Rayyan
7	FW	Ahmed Alaaeldin	31 January 1993 (aged 28)	35	0	(Qatar Football Association) Al-Gharafa
8	DF	Ahmed Suhail	8 February 1999 (aged 22)	1	0	(Qatar Football Association) Al-Sadd
9	FW	Mohammed Muntari	20 December 1993 (aged 27)	33	10	(Qatar Football Association) Al-Duhail
10	FW	Hassan Al-Haydos	11 December 1990 (aged 30)	141	31	(Qatar Football Association) Al-Sadd
11	FW	Akram Afif	18 November 1996 (aged 24)	64	19	(Qatar Football Association) Al-Sadd
12	MF	Karim Boudiaf	16 September 1990 (aged 30)	90	5	(Qatar Football Association) Al-Duhail
13	DF	Musab Kheder	26 September 1993 (aged 27)	20	0	(Qatar Football Association) Al-Sadd
14	DF	Homam Ahmed	25 August 1999 (aged 21)	6	0	(Qatar Football Association) Al-Gharafa
15	DF	Bassam Al-Rawi	16 December 1997 (aged 23)	33	2	(Qatar Football Association) Al-Duhail
16	DF	Boualem Khoukhi	7 September 1990 (aged 30)	79	19	(Qatar Football Association) Al-Sadd
17	MF	Ismaeel Mohammad	5 April 1990 (aged 31)	58	4	(Qatar Football Association) Al-Duhail
18	FW	Yusuf Abdurisag	6 August 1999 (aged 21)	11	1	(Qatar Football Association) Al-Sadd
19	FW	Almoez Ali	19 August 1996 (aged 24)	62	30	(Qatar Football Association) Al-Duhail
20	MF	Abdullah Al-Ahrak	10 May 1997 (aged 24)	16	1	(Qatar Football Association) Al-Duhail
21	GK	Yousef Hassan	24 May 1996 (aged 25)	6	0	(Qatar Football Association) Al-Gharafa
22	GK	Meshaal Barsham	14 February 1998 (aged 23)	4	0	(Qatar Football Association) Al-Sadd
23	MF	Assim Madibo	22 October 1996 (aged 24)	28	0	(Qatar Football Association) Al-Duhail

== Player representation ==
=== By club nationality ===
Key
Bold	Nation represented at the tournament
Italic	Nation not a CONCACAF member

Players	Clubs
67	**United States**
47	France (Note: Including overseas regions)
23	**Qatar**
21	England
19	**Martinique**
17	**Costa Rica**; Netherlands
16	France (Note: Excluding overseas regions); **Mexico**
15	**El Salvador**
14	**Honduras**; **Canada**
12	**Guadeloupe**; Spain
10	**Trinidad and Tobago**
7	**Grenada**; Portugal
6	Germany
5	**Panama**; **Suriname**
4	Turkey; Peru
3	Belgium; Cyprus; **Haiti**; Israel; India
2	Colombia; Denmark; Ecuador; **Guatemala**; Italy; Scotland; Sweden; Uruguay
1	Australia; Austria; Bolivia; Chile; Croatia; Egypt; **Jamaica**; Kazakhstan; Norway; Romania; Saudi Arabia; Slovakia; South Korea; Switzerland; United Arab Emirates; Wales

The above table is the same when it comes to league representation, with only the following exceptions:

- The English league system has 22 representatives, including one player from Wales-based Cardiff City.
- The American league system has 78 representatives, including eleven players from Canada-based CF Montréal, Toronto FC and Vancouver Whitecaps FC.

No national team had all its players from the nation's club teams, except invitee Qatar. Every national team also had at least one player from a club of its nation, except Curaçao.
