= 2021 CONCACAF Gold Cup Group C =

Football competition

Group C of the 2021 CONCACAF Gold Cup took place from 12 to 20 July 2021 in Houston's BBVA Stadium and Orlando's Exploria Stadium. The group consisted of Costa Rica, Guadeloupe, Jamaica, and Suriname. The top two teams, Costa Rica and Jamaica, advanced to the quarter-finals, while the other two teams were eliminated.

== Teams ==
Draw position	Team	Pot	Method of qualification	Date of qualification	Finals appearance only Gold Cup era (since 1991)	Last appearance	Previous best performance only Gold Cup era (since 1991)	CONCACAF Rankings		FIFA Rankings (May 2021)
Draw position	Team	Pot	Method of qualification	Date of qualification	Finals appearance only Gold Cup era (since 1991)	Last appearance	Previous best performance only Gold Cup era (since 1991)	August 2020 (Note: The CONCACAF rankings of August 2020 were used for seeding for the final draw.)	July 2021 (Note: CONCACAF rankings at the start of the tournament (as of 1 July 2021).)	FIFA Rankings (May 2021)
A1	Costa Rica	1	CNL League A Group D 1st place	15 November 2019	15th	2019	Runners-up (2002)	3	4	50
A2	Jamaica	2	CNL League B Group C 1st place	16 November 2019	12th	2019	Runners-up (2015, 2017)	5	6	45
A3	Suriname	3	CNL League B Group D 1st place	17 November 2019	1st	–	–	15	15	136
A4	Guadeloupe	4	GCQ winners	6 July 2021	4th	2011	Semi-finals (2007)	16	16	–

== Standings ==
Pos	Team	Pld	W	D	L	GF	GA	GD	Pts	Qualification
1	Costa Rica	3	3	0	0	6	2	+4	9	Advance to knockout stage
2	Jamaica	3	2	0	1	4	2	+2	6	Advance to knockout stage
3	Suriname	3	1	0	2	3	5	−2	3	
4	Guadeloupe	3	0	0	3	3	7	−4	0	

Source: CONCACAF
Rules for classification: Group stage tiebreakers

In the quarter-finals:

- The winners of Group C, Costa Rica, advanced to play the runners-up of Group B, Canada.
- The runners-up of Group C, Jamaica, advanced to play the winners of Group B, the United States.

== Matches ==
=== Jamaica vs Suriname ===
12 July 2021
18:30

Jamaica	2–0	Suriname
Nicholson 6'; De Cordova-Reid 26'	Report

Exploria Stadium, Orlando
Attendance: 6,403
Referee: Bakary Gassama (Gambia)

Jamaica	Suriname

GK	1	Andre Blake (c)
RB	5	Alvas Powell		(substituted off) 72'
CB	17	Damion Lowe
CB	6	Liam Moore
LB	4	Amari'i Bell	(yellow card) 90+1'
RM	7	Leon Bailey		(substituted off) 83'
CM	16	Daniel Johnson
CM	3	Michael Hector		(substituted off) 72'
LM	15	Blair Turgott		(substituted off) 72'
SS	10	Bobby De Cordova-Reid		(substituted off) 89'
CF	11	Shamar Nicholson
Substitutions:
FW	9	Cory Burke		(substituted on) 72'
MF	22	Devon Williams		(substituted on) 72'
DF	8	Oniel Fisher		(substituted on) 72'
FW	12	Junior Flemmings		(substituted on) 83'
MF	2	Lamar Walker		(substituted on) 89'
Head coach:
Theodore Whitmore

GK	1	Warner Hahn
RB	3	Sean Klaiber	(yellow card) 25'	(substituted off) 64'
CB	4	Dion Malone
CB	15	Ryan Donk (c)	(yellow card) 37'
LB	5	Ridgeciano Haps
RM	7	Florian Jozefzoon		(substituted off) 81'
CM	2	Damil Dankerlui
CM	18	Kelvin Leerdam	(yellow card) 88'
LM	11	Sheraldo Becker
CF	20	Gleofilo Vlijter		(substituted off) 64'
CF	21	Diego Biseswar
Substitutions:
FW	9	Nigel Hasselbaink		(substituted on) 64'
MF	6	Ryan Koolwijk		(substituted on) 64'
FW	22	Ivenzo Comvalius		(substituted on) 81'
Head coach:
Dean Gorré

Man of the Match:
Andre Blake (Jamaica)

Assistant referees:
Djibril Camará (Senegal)
Micheal Barwegen (Canada)
Fourth official:
Adonai Escobedo (Mexico)
Video assistant referee:
Drew Fischer (Canada)
Assistant video assistant referee:
Ismael Cornejo (El Salvador)

=== Costa Rica vs Guadeloupe ===
12 July 2021
21:00

Costa Rica	3–1	Guadeloupe
Campbell 6'; Lassiter 21'; Borges 70'	Report	Mirval 45+5'

Exploria Stadium, Orlando
Attendance: 6,403
Referee: Ismail Elfath (United States)

Costa Rica	Guadeloupe

GK	23	Leonel Moreira
RB	4	Keysher Fuller
CB	19	Kendall Waston	(yellow card) 40'	(substituted off) 89'
CB	15	Francisco Calvo
LB	22	Rónald Matarrita	(yellow card) 77'
DM	20	David Guzmán		(substituted off) 89'
RM	12	Joel Campbell
CM	5	Celso Borges
CM	10	Bryan Ruiz (c)		(substituted off) 63'
LM	11	Ariel Lassiter	(yellow card) 45+4'	(substituted off) 63'
CF	21	José Guillermo Ortiz		(substituted off) 70'
Substitutions:
MF	8	Luis Díaz		(substituted on) 63'
MF	7	Johan Venegas	(yellow card) 90+2'	(substituted on) 63'
MF	16	Alonso Martínez		(substituted on) 70'
DF	3	Giancarlo González		(substituted on) 89'
MF	17	Jefferson Brenes		(substituted on) 89'
Head coach:
(Colombia) Luis Fernando Suárez

GK	23	Yohann Thuram-Ulien
CB	20	Stevenson Casimir
CB	17	Anthony Baron
CB	5	Steve Solvet	(yellow card) 28' (red card) 54'
RWB	12	Mickaël Alphonse (c)
LWB	3	Kelly Irep
CM	13	Morgan Saint-Maximin
CM	8	Kévin Malpon		(substituted off) 85'
RF	7	Mavrick Annerose		(substituted off) 58'
CF	9	Raphaël Mirval		(substituted off) 68'
LF	10	Matthias Phaëton	(yellow card) 84'	(substituted off) 85'
Substitutions:
MF	6	Quentin Annette		(substituted on) 58'
FW	22	Dimitri Ramothe		(substituted on) 68'
FW	14	Vikash Tillé		(substituted on) 85'
FW	19	Luther Archimède		(substituted on) 85'
Head coach:
(France) Jocelyn Angloma

Man of the Match:
Joel Campbell (Costa Rica)

Assistant referees:
Corey Parker (United States)
Kyle Atkins (United States)
Fourth official:
Nima Saghafi (United States)
Video assistant referee:
Chris Penso (United States)
Assistant video assistant referee:
Armando Villarreal (United States)

=== Guadeloupe vs Jamaica ===
16 July 2021
18:30

Guadeloupe	1–2	Jamaica
Ramothe 4'	Report	Burke 14'; Flemmings 87'

Exploria Stadium, Orlando
Attendance: 6,527
Referee: Bryan López (Guatemala)

Guadeloupe	Jamaica

GK	23	Yohann Thuram-Ulien
RB	12	Mickaël Alphonse (c)
CB	20	Stevenson Casimir	(yellow card) 41'
CB	17	Anthony Baron
LB	3	Kelly Irep
CM	13	Morgan Saint-Maximin
CM	6	Quentin Annette		(substituted off) 77'
CM	8	Kévin Malpon		(substituted off) 77'
RF	22	Dimitri Ramothe		(substituted off) 64'
CF	19	Luther Archimède		(substituted off) 14'
LF	10	Matthias Phaëton
Substitutions:
FW	9	Raphaël Mirval		(substituted on) 14'
FW	14	Vikash Tillé		(substituted on) 64'
DF	2	Kévin Moeson		(substituted on) 77'
MF	7	Mavrick Annerose		(substituted on) 77'
Head coach:
(France) Jocelyn Angloma

GK	1	Andre Blake (c)
RB	5	Alvas Powell	(yellow card) 63'
CB	17	Damion Lowe
CB	6	Liam Moore	(yellow card) 71'
LB	4	Amari'i Bell		(substituted off) 70'
RM	7	Leon Bailey	(yellow card) 62'
CM	3	Michael Hector		(substituted off) 61'
CM	16	Daniel Johnson
LM	15	Blair Turgott		(substituted off) 61'
CF	9	Cory Burke
CF	11	Shamar Nicholson		(substituted off) 82'
Substitutions:
FW	12	Junior Flemmings		(substituted on) 61'
MF	22	Devon Williams		(substituted on) 61'
DF	20	Kemar Lawrence		(substituted on) 70'
FW	14	Andre Gray		(substituted on) 82'
Head coach:
Theodore Whitmore

Man of the Match:
Andre Blake (Jamaica)

Assistant referees:
Frank Anderson (United States)
Gerson López (Guatemala)
Fourth official:
José Torres (Puerto Rico)
Video assistant referee:
David Gantar (Canada)
Assistant video assistant referee:
Tatiana Guzmán (Nicaragua)

=== Suriname vs Costa Rica ===
16 July 2021
21:00

Suriname	1–2	Costa Rica
Vlijter 52'	Report	Campbell 58'; Borges 59'

Exploria Stadium, Orlando
Attendance: 6,527
Referee: Fernando Hernández (Mexico)

Suriname	Costa Rica

GK	1	Warner Hahn
RB	3	Sean Klaiber		(substituted off) 62'
CB	4	Dion Malone
CB	15	Ryan Donk (c)	(yellow card) 31'
LB	5	Ridgeciano Haps	(yellow card) 30'
RM	7	Florian Jozefzoon		(substituted off) 61'
CM	2	Damil Dankerlui		(substituted off) 83'
CM	18	Kelvin Leerdam
LM	11	Sheraldo Becker		(substituted off) 61'
SS	21	Diego Biseswar
CF	20	Gleofilo Vlijter
Substitutions:
FW	9	Nigel Hasselbaink		(substituted on) 61'
FW	22	Ivenzo Comvalius		(substituted on) 61'
MF	6	Ryan Koolwijk		(substituted on) 62'
MF	16	Mitchell Donald		(substituted on) 83'
Head coach:
Dean Gorré

GK	1	Esteban Alvarado	(yellow card) 43'
RB	4	Keysher Fuller
CB	3	Giancarlo González
CB	15	Francisco Calvo	(yellow card) 66' (red card) 86'
LB	22	Rónald Matarrita
DM	17	Jefferson Brenes		(substituted off) 46'
CM	5	Celso Borges (c)
CM	8	Luis Díaz		(substituted off) 68'
RW	12	Joel Campbell		(substituted off) 88'
LW	7	Johan Venegas		(substituted off) 90+4'
CF	9	Ariel Rodríguez		(substituted off) 46'
Substitutions:
MF	16	Alonso Martínez		(substituted on) 46'
MF	20	David Guzmán	(yellow card) 73'	(substituted on) 46'
FW	11	Ariel Lassiter		(substituted on) 68'
DF	19	Kendall Waston	(yellow card) 88'	(substituted on) 88'
FW	21	José Guillermo Ortiz		(substituted on) 90+4'
Head coach:
(Colombia) Luis Fernando Suárez

Man of the Match:
Joel Campbell (Costa Rica)

Assistant referees:
Miguel Hernández (Mexico)
Kathryn Nesbitt (United States)
Fourth official:
Fernando Guerrero (Mexico)
Video assistant referee:
César Ramos (Mexico)
Assistant video assistant referee:
Jair Marrufo (United States)

=== Costa Rica vs Jamaica ===
20 July 2021
19:00 (Note: The Costa Rica vs Jamaica match was stopped after two minutes of play due to thunderstorms in the area. The match was resumed at 21:20 EDT (UTC−4).)

Costa Rica	1–0	Jamaica
Ruiz 53'	Report

Exploria Stadium, Orlando
Attendance: 10,264
Referee: Mario Escobar (Guatemala)

Costa Rica	Jamaica

GK	23	Leonel Moreira	(red card) 72'
RB	2	Yael López		(substituted off) 75'
CB	3	Giancarlo González
CB	6	Óscar Duarte
LB	4	Keysher Fuller
CM	13	Allan Cruz		(substituted off) 65'
CM	20	David Guzmán
CM	10	Bryan Ruiz (c)		(substituted off) 65'
RF	16	Alonso Martínez		(substituted off) 74'
CF	12	Joel Campbell
LF	11	Ariel Lassiter		(substituted off) 85'
Substitutions:
MF	5	Celso Borges		(substituted on) 65'
MF	7	Johan Venegas		(substituted on) 65'
GK	1	Esteban Alvarado		(substituted on) 74'
DF	22	Rónald Matarrita		(substituted on) 75'
MF	17	Jefferson Brenes		(substituted on) 85'
Head coach:
(Colombia) Luis Fernando Suárez

GK	13	Dillon Barnes
RB	8	Oniel Fisher	(yellow card) 78'
CB	17	Damion Lowe (c)
CB	19	Adrian Mariappa
LB	20	Kemar Lawrence		(substituted off) 60'
CM	16	Daniel Johnson		(substituted off) 81'
CM	22	Devon Williams
AM	21	Tyreek Magee		(substituted off) 81'
RF	15	Blair Turgott		(substituted off) 66'
CF	14	Andre Gray		(substituted off) 66'
LF	12	Junior Flemmings
Substitutions:
DF	4	Amari'i Bell		(substituted on) 60'
FW	11	Shamar Nicholson		(substituted on) 66'
FW	9	Cory Burke		(substituted on) 66'
DF	6	Liam Moore		(substituted on) 81'
MF	2	Lamar Walker		(substituted on) 81'
Head coach:
Theodore Whitmore

Man of the Match:
Bryan Ruiz (Costa Rica)

Assistant referees:
Caleb Wales (Trinidad and Tobago)
Miguel Hernández (Mexico)
Fourth official:
Diego Montaño (Mexico)
Video assistant referee:
Arturo Cruz (Mexico)
Assistant video assistant referee:
Armando Villarreal (United States)

=== Suriname vs Guadeloupe ===
20 July 2021
19:00 (18:00 UTC−5)

Suriname	2–1	Guadeloupe
Vlijter 14'; Hasselbaink 79'	Report	Phaëton 20'

BBVA Stadium, Houston
Attendance: 10,625
Referee: Fernando Guerrero (Mexico)

Suriname	Guadeloupe

GK	1	Warner Hahn
RB	3	Sean Klaiber		(substituted off) 56'
CB	4	Dion Malone
CB	18	Kelvin Leerdam (c)
LB	5	Ridgeciano Haps
CM	14	Sersinho Eduard		(substituted off) 67'
CM	6	Ryan Koolwijk	(yellow card) 90+6'	(substituted off) 57'
RW	22	Ivenzo Comvalius
AM	21	Diego Biseswar
LW	17	Dimitrie Apai		(substituted off) 57'
CF	20	Gleofilo Vlijter		(substituted off) 82'
Substitutions:
DF	2	Damil Dankerlui		(substituted on) 56'
MF	8	Roland Alberg	(yellow card) 78'	(substituted on) 57'
FW	11	Sheraldo Becker		(substituted on) 57'
FW	9	Nigel Hasselbaink		(substituted on) 67'
FW	10	Alvaro Verwey		(substituted on) 82'
Head coach:
Dean Gorré

GK	16	Kévin Ajax
CB	4	Ronan Hauterville (c)
CB	17	Anthony Baron
CB	5	Steve Solvet	(yellow card) 90+3'
RM	2	Kévin Moeson		(substituted off) 85'
CM	13	Morgan Saint-Maximin		(substituted off) 62'
CM	6	Quentin Annette	(yellow card) 70' (yellow-red card) 90+6'	(substituted off) 82'
LM	3	Kelly Irep	(red card) 29'
RF	9	Raphaël Mirval		(substituted off) 63'
CF	14	Vikash Tillé		(substituted off) 46'
LF	10	Matthias Phaëton
Substitutions:
DF	18	Thomas Pineau	(yellow card) 90+2'	(substituted on) 46'
MF	8	Kévin Malpon		(substituted on) 62'
MF	7	Mavrick Annerose		(substituted on) 63'
FW	11	Skeveen Romage		(substituted on) 82'
DF	21	Colman Makouké		(substituted on) 85'
Head coach:
(France) Jocelyn Angloma

Man of the Match:
Kévin Ajax (Guadeloupe)

Assistant referees:
Micheal Barwegen (Canada)
William Arrieta (Costa Rica)
Fourth official:
José Torres (Puerto Rico)
Video assistant referee:
David Gantar (Canada)
Assistant video assistant referee:
Tatiana Guzmán (Nicaragua)

== Discipline ==
Fair play points would have been used as a tiebreaker if the overall and head-to-head records of teams were tied. These were calculated based on yellow and red cards received in all group matches as follows:

- first yellow card: minus 1 point;
- indirect red card (second yellow card): minus 3 points;
- direct red card: minus 4 points;
- yellow card and direct red card: minus 5 points;

Only one of the above deductions was applied to a player in a single match.

Team	Match 1				Match 2				Match 3				Points
Team	Booked	(yellow card) (yellow-red card)	Sent off (straight red)	(yellow card) (red card)	Booked	(yellow card) (yellow-red card)	Sent off (straight red)	(yellow card) (red card)	Booked	(yellow card) (yellow-red card)	Sent off (straight red)	(yellow card) (red card)	Points
Jamaica	1				3				1				–5
Suriname	3				2				2				–7
Costa Rica	4				3			1			1		–16
Guadeloupe	1			1	1				2	1	1		–16
