= 2021 CONCACAF Gold Cup qualification =

2021 CONCACAF Gold Cup Prelims
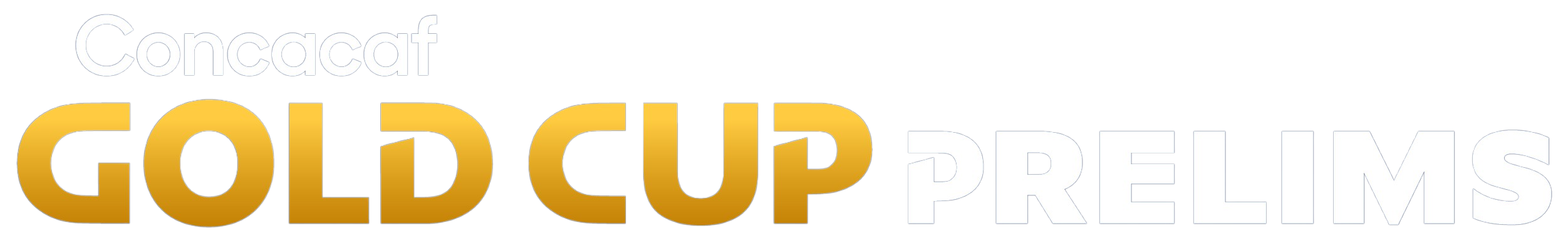

Tournament details
- Host country: United States
- Dates: 2–6 July
- Teams: 12
- Venue: 1 (in 1 host city)

Tournament statistics
- Matches played: 8
- Goals scored: 38 (4.75 per match)
- Attendance: 37,455 (4,682 per match)
- Top scorer(s): (Bermuda) Nahki Wells (Haiti) Frantzdy Pierrot (4 goals each)

The 2021 CONCACAF Gold Cup qualification tournament determined the final three teams to qualify for the 2021 CONCACAF Gold Cup.

Prior to the qualifiers, twelve of the sixteen teams of the 2021 CONCACAF Gold Cup had already been decided based on the results of the 2019–20 CONCACAF Nations League:

- Eight teams from 2019–20 CONCACAF Nations League A qualified as the top two teams of each group.
- Four teams from 2019–20 CONCACAF Nations League B qualified as the winners of each group.

Another twelve teams competed in the qualifiers. The matches were originally scheduled to be played in March and June 2020, but were postponed due to the COVID-19 pandemic. The matches took place from 2 to 6 July 2021, the week before the start of the Gold Cup group stage, at DRV PNK Stadium, Fort Lauderdale, Florida, United States.

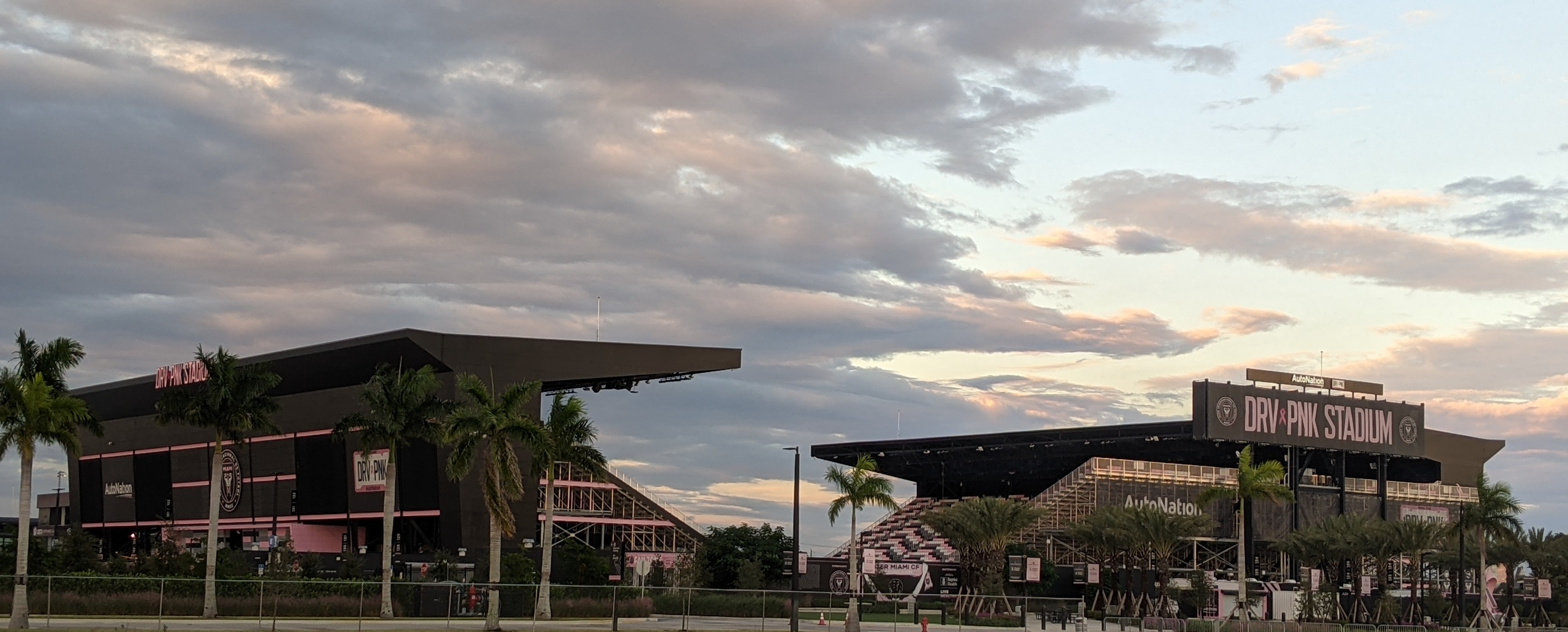
DRV PNK Stadium in Fort Lauderdale hosted the matches

== Teams ==
Twelve teams participated in the 2021 CONCACAF Gold Cup Qualifiers based on the results of the 2019–20 CONCACAF Nations League. These teams were the four group third-placed teams of League A, the four group runners-up of League B, and the four group winners of League C.

League A
Group	Third place
A	Cuba
B	Bermuda
C	Trinidad and Tobago
D	Haiti

League B
Group	Runners-up
A	French Guiana
B	Montserrat
C	Guyana
D	Saint Vincent and the Grenadines

League C
Group	Winners
A	Barbados
B	Bahamas
C	Guatemala
D	Guadeloupe

Following the suspension of the Trinidad and Tobago Football Association by FIFA on 24 September 2020, CONCACAF announced the following day that Trinidad and Tobago would still participate in the qualifying draw scheduled for 28 September 2020. If the suspension had not been lifted by 18 December 2020, Trinidad and Tobago would have been replaced by the next highest-ranked team in the CONCACAF Nations League which did not qualify for the Gold Cup finals or preliminaries, Antigua and Barbuda (a third-placed team in League B).

== Original format ==
The first round was originally to be played on 26 and 31 March 2020. The four winners of Nations League C would face the four runner-ups of Nations League B, played as two-legged ties. The teams from League B would host the second legs. The four winners would advance to the second round. The second round was originally to be played during the FIFA international window of 1 to 9 June 2020. The four first round winners would face the four third-placed teams of Nations League A, played as two-legged ties. The teams from League A would host the second legs. The four winners would qualify for the 2021 CONCACAF Gold Cup.

=== Draw ===
The qualifying draw took place on 11 December 2019, 19:00 EST (UTC−5), in Miami, Florida, United States. Three pots were prepared, with Pot A containing the League A teams, Pot B containing the League B teams and Pot C containing the League C teams. To draw the first round matches, teams from Pot C were first drawn and allocated, in order, to pairings 1 to 4. To complete the fixtures, teams from Pot B were then drawn and allocated, in order, to pairings 1 to 4. To draw the second round matches, the Pot A teams were drawn and allocated to face the winners of first round pairings 1 to 4.

The draw results were as follows:

First round			Second round		
Match	Team 1 (League C)	Team 2 (League B)	Match	Team 1 (Winner R1)	Team 2 (League A)
1	Guadeloupe	Saint Vincent and the Grenadines	5	Winner 1	Haiti
2	Barbados	Guyana	6	Winner 2	Trinidad and Tobago
3	Bahamas	French Guiana	7	Winner 3	Bermuda
4	Guatemala	Montserrat	8	Winner 4	Cuba

=== Postponement ===
On 13 March 2020, CONCACAF suspended all upcoming competitions scheduled to take place over the next 30 days due to the COVID-19 pandemic, with the new dates of the matches to be confirmed later. On 3 April 2020, CONCACAF announced the suspension of the June qualifiers, with the new dates of the matches to be confirmed at a later time.

== New format ==
On 27 July 2020, CONCACAF announced that the qualifiers would be played by the twelve teams as a centralized preliminary round in the United States, in the week prior to the 2021 CONCACAF Gold Cup group stage. On 2 September 2020, CONCACAF announced that Qatar were invited to the Gold Cup as guests, and that the qualification tournament would determine the last three teams to participate in the group stage of the Gold Cup. The qualification tournament featured two rounds, with the twelve participating teams divided into six one-off ties in the first round. The six winners advanced to the second round, with the winners of the three one-off matches qualifying for the Gold Cup.

=== Draw ===
The draw for the first round took place in Miami, Florida, United States on 28 September 2020, 20:00 EDT (UTC−4), along with the draw for the Gold Cup group stage. The top six teams based on the CONCACAF Rankings of August 2020 were pre-seeded into matches 1 to 6 (highest ranked in match 1, second-highest ranked in match 2, etc.), while the remaining six teams were drawn from a single pot. The fixtures for the second round were predetermined.

The following was the composition of the draw pots (August 2020 CONCACAF Rankings show in parentheses):

Pot 1 (seeded)
Team	Rank
Haiti	7
Guatemala	9
Trinidad and Tobago	12
Cuba	14
Guadeloupe	16
Bermuda	17

Pot 2 (unseeded)
Team	Rank
French Guiana	18
Guyana	19
Saint Vincent and the Grenadines	23
Barbados	29
Montserrat	30
Bahamas	33

== Bracket ==
The match schedule was announced on 13 May 2021.

All match times listed are local, EDT (UTC−4).

First round
2 July – Fort Lauderdale
Haiti	6
Saint Vincent and the Grenadines	1
2 July – Fort Lauderdale
Bermuda	8
Barbados	1
3 July – Fort Lauderdale
Guatemala	4
Guyana	0
3 July – Fort Lauderdale
Guadeloupe	2
Bahamas	0
2 July – Fort Lauderdale
Trinidad and Tobago	6
Montserrat	1
3 July – Fort Lauderdale
Cuba	0
French Guiana (awd.)	3

Second round
6 July – Fort Lauderdale
Haiti	4
Bermuda	1
6 July – Fort Lauderdale
Guatemala	1 (9)
Guadeloupe (p)	1 (10)
6 July – Fort Lauderdale
Trinidad and Tobago (p)	1 (8)
French Guiana	1 (7)

== First round ==
=== Summary ===
Team 1	Score	Team 2
Haiti	6–1	Saint Vincent and the Grenadines
Guatemala	4–0	Guyana
Trinidad and Tobago	6–1	Montserrat
Cuba	0–3 (awd.)	French Guiana
Guadeloupe	2–0	Bahamas
Bermuda	8–1	Barbados

=== Matches ===
2 July 2021
16:30

Haiti	6–1	Saint Vincent and the G.
Nazon 26' (pen.), 59'; Pierrot 33'; Etienne 37' (pen.); Sutherland 72' (o.g.); Antoine 90'	Report	Edwards 42'

DRV PNK Stadium, Fort Lauderdale
Attendance: 2,601
Referee: Oshane Nation (Jamaica)

3 July 2021
21:30

Guatemala	4–0	Guyana
Greenidge 21' (o.g.); L. Martínez 54'; Lom 71'; J. Martínez 80'	Report

DRV PNK Stadium, Fort Lauderdale
Attendance: 17,161
Referee: Juan Gabriel Calderón (Costa Rica)

2 July 2021
21:30

Trinidad and Tobago	6–1	Montserrat
Molino 21' (pen.); Joseph 35'; Telfer 45+2'; Jud. García 57'; Moore 68', 82'	Report	Taylor 55'

DRV PNK Stadium, Fort Lauderdale
Attendance: 7,425
Referee: Bryan López (Guatemala)

3 July 2021
19:00

Cuba	0–3 Awarded (Note: Due to COVID-19 related travel and visa challenges regarding the Cuban team, the match was cancelled and awarded as a win to French Guiana.)	French Guiana
	Report

DRV PNK Stadium, Fort Lauderdale
Attendance: 0

3 July 2021
16:30

Guadeloupe	2–0	Bahamas
Phaëton 61'; Mirval 67'	Report

DRV PNK Stadium, Fort Lauderdale
Attendance: 100
Referee: Reon Radix (Grenada)

2 July 2021
19:00

Bermuda	8–1	Barbados
Wells 1', 14', 87' (pen.); Lambe 29'; Leverock 39'; Pearce 60' (o.g.); Crichlow 66'; Lewis 67'	Report	Holligan 45+1'

DRV PNK Stadium, Fort Lauderdale
Attendance: 2,025
Referee: Drew Fischer (Canada)

== Second round ==
=== Summary ===
Team 1	Score	Team 2
Haiti	4–1	Bermuda
Guatemala	1–1 (9–10 p)	Guadeloupe
Trinidad and Tobago	1–1 (8–7 p)	French Guiana

=== Matches ===
6 July 2021
19:00

Haiti	4–1	Bermuda
Pierrot 23', 28', 34'; Nazon 87' (pen.)	Report	Wells 80'

DRV PNK Stadium, Fort Lauderdale
Attendance: 3,448
Referee: Iván Barton (El Salvador)

6 July 2021
21:30

Guatemala	1–1	Guadeloupe
L. Martínez 17'	Report	Phaëton 6'
Penalties
Ceballos (penalty missed); J. Martínez (penalty scored); Santis (penalty scored); Barrientos (penalty scored); Hernández (penalty scored); Pineda (penalty scored); Pinto (penalty scored); Saravia (penalty scored); Peleg (penalty scored); Gordillo (penalty missed); Jérez (penalty scored); Ceballos (penalty missed)	9–10	(penalty scored) Cavaré; (penalty scored) Phaëton; (penalty missed) Baron; (penalty scored) Annerose; (penalty scored) Solvet; (penalty scored) Annette; (penalty scored) Pineau; (penalty scored) Hauterville; (penalty scored) Moeson; (penalty missed) Alphonse; (penalty scored) Thuram-Ulien; (penalty scored) Cavaré

DRV PNK Stadium, Fort Lauderdale
Attendance: 3,571
Referee: Fernando Hernández (Mexico)

6 July 2021
16:30

Trinidad and Tobago	1–1	French Guiana
Molino 27'	Report	Abelinti 44'
Penalties
Muckette (penalty scored); Hackshaw (penalty scored); Peters (penalty scored); Fortune (penalty scored); Molino (penalty scored); Jones (penalty scored); Jus. García (penalty scored); Gonzales (penalty scored)	8–7	(penalty scored) Vancaeyezeele; (penalty scored) Atchaliso; (penalty scored) Evens; (penalty scored) Baal; (penalty scored) Éric; (penalty scored) Adam; (penalty scored) Marigard; (penalty missed) Rimane

DRV PNK Stadium, Fort Lauderdale
Attendance: 1,124
Referee: Ismail Elfath (United States)

== Ranking of losing teams ==
On 9 July 2021, CONCACAF announced that Curaçao, who had qualified for the 2021 CONCACAF Gold Cup via the 2019–20 CONCACAF Nations League (League A Group D second place), would not participate in the tournament due to a high number of COVID-19 cases within the team. As a result, CONCACAF decided to replace them with the next highest-ranked team from qualification (based on wins, draws and goal difference), Guatemala.

Pos	Team	Pld	W	D	L	GF	GA	GD	Pts	Qualification
1	Guatemala	2	1	1	0	5	1	+4	4	Qualification to 2021 Gold Cup
2	French Guiana	2	1	1	0	4	1	+3	4	
3	Bermuda	2	1	0	1	9	5	+4	3	
4	Bahamas	1	0	0	1	0	2	−2	0	
5	Cuba	1	0	0	1	0	3	−3	0	
6	Guyana	1	0	0	1	0	4	−4	0	
7	Montserrat	1	0	0	1	1	6	−5	0	
7	Saint Vincent and the Grenadines	1	0	0	1	1	6	−5	0	
9	Barbados	1	0	0	1	1	8	−7	0	

Source: CONCACAF
Rules for classification: 1) Points; 2) Goal difference; 3) Goals scored.

== Qualified teams ==
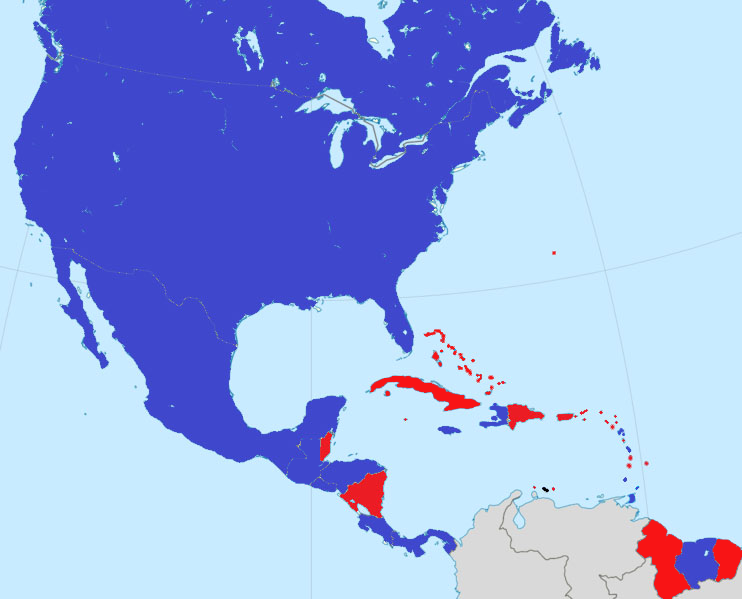
Team qualified for CONCACAF Gold Cup Team failed to qualify Team disqualified

Team	Qualified as	Qualified on	Previous appearances in CONCACAF Gold Cup^{1} only Gold Cup era (since 1991)
Canada	CNL League A Group A 2nd place	11 October 2019	14 (1991, 1993, 1996, **2000**, 2002, 2003, 2005, 2007, 2009, 2011, 2013, 2015, 2017, 2019)
Honduras	CNL League A Group C 1st place	13 October 2019	14 (1991, 1993, 1996, 1998, 2000, 2003, 2005, 2007, 2009, 2011, 2013, 2015, 2017, 2019)
Grenada	CNL League B Group A 1st place	14 October 2019	2 (2009, 2011)
Jamaica	CNL League B Group C 1st place	15 November 2019	11 (1991, 1993, 1998, 2000, 2003, 2005, 2009, 2011, 2015, 2017, 2019)
United States	CNL League A Group A 1st place	15 November 2019	15 (**1991**, 1993, 1996, 1998, 2000, **2002**, 2003, **2005**, **2007**, 2009, 2011, **2013**, 2015, **2017**, 2019)
Mexico	CNL League A Group B 1st place	15 November 2019	15 (1991, **1993**, **1996**, **1998**, 2000, 2002, **2003**, 2005, 2007, **2009**, **2011**, 2013, **2015**, 2017, **2019**)
El Salvador	CNL League B Group B 1st place	16 November 2019	11 (1996, 1998, 2002, 2003, 2007, 2009, 2011, 2013, 2015, 2017, 2019)
Costa Rica	CNL League A Group D 1st place	17 November 2019	14 (1991, 1993, 1998, 2000, 2002, 2003, 2005, 2007, 2009, 2011, 2013, 2015, 2017, 2019)
Martinique	CNL League A Group C 2nd place	17 November 2019	6 (1993, 2002, 2003, 2013, 2017, 2019)
Suriname	CNL League B Group D 1st place	18 November 2019	0 (debut)
Panama	CNL League A Group B 2nd place	19 November 2019	9 (1993, 2005, 2007, 2009, 2011, 2013, 2015, 2017, 2019)
Qatar	Invitees	2 September 2020	0 (debut)
Trinidad and Tobago	Prelims 9 winner	6 July 2021	10 (1991, 1996, 1998, 2000, 2002, 2005, 2007, 2013, 2015, 2019)
Haiti	Prelims 7 winner	6 July 2021	7 (2000, 2002, 2007, 2009, 2013, 2015, 2019)
Guadeloupe	Prelims 8 winner	6 July 2021	3 (2007, 2009, 2011)
Guatemala	Next best-ranked team from prelims	9 July 2021	10 (1991, 1996, 1998, 2000, 2002, 2003, 2005, 2007, 2011, 2015)

^{1} Bold indicates champions for that year. Italic indicates hosts for that year.

== Statistics ==
=== Goalscorers ===
There were 38 goals scored in 8 matches, for an average of 4.75 goals per match.

4 goals

- (Bermuda) Nahki Wells
- (Haiti) Frantzdy Pierrot

3 goals

- (Haiti) Duckens Nazon

2 goals

- (Guadeloupe) Matthias Phaëton
- (Guatemala) Luis Martínez
- (Trinidad and Tobago) Kevin Molino
- (Trinidad and Tobago) Reon Moore

1 goal

- (Barbados) Hadan Holligan
- (Bermuda) Kane Crichlow
- (Bermuda) Reggie Lambe
- (Bermuda) Dante Leverock
- (Bermuda) Zeiko Lewis
- (French Guiana) Arnold Abelinti
- (Guadeloupe) Raphaël Mirval
- (Guatemala) Darwin Lom
- (Guatemala) José Carlos Martínez
- (Haiti) Carnejy Antoine
- (Haiti) Derrick Etienne
- (Montserrat) Lyle Taylor
- (Saint Vincent and the Grenadines) Kyle Edwards
- (Trinidad and Tobago) Judah García
- (Trinidad and Tobago) Marcus Joseph
- (Trinidad and Tobago) Ryan Telfer

1 own goal

- (Barbados) Krystian Pearce (against Bermuda)
- (Guyana) Reiss Greenidge (against Guatemala)
- (Saint Vincent and the Grenadines) Jahvin Sutherland (against Haiti)

=== Best XI ===
The Best XI squad of the first and second preliminary rounds was selected by CONCACAF following the conclusion of matches.

Goalkeeper	Defenders	Midfielders	Forwards
(Trinidad and Tobago) Nicklas Frenderup	(Guadeloupe) Ronan Hauterville (Guatemala) Gerardo Gordillo (Trinidad and Tobago) Aubrey David	(Trinidad and Tobago) Ryan Telfer (Haiti) Derrick Etienne (Trinidad and Tobago) Kevin Molino (Guadeloupe) Matthias Phaëton	(Haiti) Frantzdy Pierrot (Haiti) Duckens Nazon (Bermuda) Nahki Wells
