= Raphaël Mirval =

Guadeloupean footballer (born 1996)

Personal information
- Full name: Raphaël Sylvain Mirval
- Date of birth: 4 May 1996 (age 30)
- Place of birth: Baie-Mahault, Guadeloupe
- Height: 1.85 m (6 ft 1 in)
- Position: Forward

Team information
- Current team: Aglianese Calcio 1923
- Number: 90

Senior career*
Years	Team	Apps	(Gls)
2015–2017	Perugia	1	(0)
2017	Villabiagio	5	(0)
2018–2020	USBM	52	(38)
2020–2021	Solidarité-Scolaire	16	(18)
2021–	Aglianese Calcio 1923	0	(0)

International career^{‡}
2018–	Guadeloupe	13	(9)
- * Club domestic league appearances and goals as of 1 December 2017 ‡ National team caps and goals as of 12 July 2021

Raphaël Sylvain Mirval (born 4 May 1996) is a Guadeloupean international playing for Italian Serie D club Aglianese.

== Club career ==
He made his professional debut in the Serie B for Perugia on 8 December 2015 in a game against Novara.

== International career ==
Mirval first played for the Guadeloupe national team in a friendly 1–0 loss to Trinidad and Tobago on 23 March 2018.

=== International goals ===
Scores and results list Guadeloupe's goal tally first.

No.	Date	Venue	Opponent	Score	Result	Competition
1.	10 September 2019	TCIFA National Academy, Providenciales, Turks and Caicos Islands	Turks and Caicos Islands	1–0	3–0	2019–20 CONCACAF Nations League C
2.	10 September 2019	TCIFA National Academy, Providenciales, Turks and Caicos Islands	Turks and Caicos Islands	2–0	3–0	2019–20 CONCACAF Nations League C
3.	14 October 2019	Ergilio Hato Stadium, Willemstad, Curaçao	Sint Maarten	1–0	2–1	2019–20 CONCACAF Nations League C
4.	14 October 2019	Ergilio Hato Stadium, Willemstad, Curaçao	Sint Maarten	2–0	2–1	2019–20 CONCACAF Nations League C
5.	17 November 2019	Stade René Serge Nabajoth, Les Abymes, Guadeloupe	Turks and Caicos Islands	1–0	10–0	2019–20 CONCACAF Nations League C
6.	17 November 2019	Stade René Serge Nabajoth, Les Abymes, Guadeloupe	Turks and Caicos Islands	2–0	10–0	2019–20 CONCACAF Nations League C
7.	17 November 2019	Stade René Serge Nabajoth, Les Abymes, Guadeloupe	Turks and Caicos Islands	6–0	10–0	2019–20 CONCACAF Nations League C
8.	3 July 2021	DRV PNK Stadium, Fort Lauderdale, United States	Bahamas	2–0	2–0	2021 CONCACAF Gold Cup qualification
9.	12 July 2021	Exploria Stadium, Orlando, United States	Costa Rica	1–2	1–3	2021 CONCACAF Gold Cup
