= Dejon Noel-Williams =

Grenadian footballer

Personal information
- Full name: Dejon Noel-Williams
- Date of birth: 22 September 1998 (age 28)
- Place of birth: Lambeth, England
- Height: 1.83 m (6 ft 0 in)
- Position: Forward

Team information
- Current team: Bedford Town

Youth career
- 2013–2016: Watford
- 2016–2017: Oxford United

Senior career*
Years	Team	Apps	(Gls)
2017–2019	Oxford United	0	(0)
2017	→ Aylesbury United (loan)	2	(1)
2018	→ North Leigh (loan)	4	(2)
2019	→ Chesham United (loan)	2	(0)
2018–2019	→ Slough Town (loan)	3	(0)
2019	→ Gloucester City (loan)	8	(2)
2019–2020	Wealdstone	6	(3)
2019	→ Hayes & Yeading United (loan)	3	(1)
2020	Billericay Town	8	(1)
2020–2021	Guadalajara	2	(0)
2021	Hemel Hempstead Town	2	(0)
2021–2022	Gloucester City	9	(0)
2022	Braintree Town	16	(0)
2022–2023	Potters Bar Town	18	(6)
2023–2024	Cheshunt	7	(2)
2024–	Bedford Town	0	(0)

International career^{‡}
2021–	Grenada	8	(0)
- * Club domestic league appearances and goals as of 17 June 2024 (UTC) ‡ National team caps and goals as of 21:56, 27 July 2022 (UTC)

Dejon Noel-Williams (born 22 September 1998) is a professional footballer who plays as a forward for National League North club Bedford Town. Born in England, he represents the Grenada national team.

== Professional career ==
A youth product of Watford and Oxford United, Noel-Williams spent his early career on various loans to lower league sides. He had stints on loan at Aylesbury United, North Leigh, Chesham United, Slough Town, Gloucester City, and Hayes & Yeading. On 7 June 2019, left Oxford United and signed a contract with Wealdstone. He transferred to Billericay Town on 3 January 2020. He moved to Spain on 27 November 2020, where he signed with Guadalajara. In August 2021, Noel-Williams returned to English football, signing for National League South club Hemel Hempstead Town. He only played two games for the Tudors, before he was on the move again, transferring to National League North side Gloucester City in October 2021, having previously had a loan spell for the club in 2019.

On 4 February 2022, Noel-Williams joined Braintree Town.

On 18 July 2022, following a short spell with Braintree, Noel-Williams made the switch to Potters Bar Town ahead of the 2022–23 campaign. In May 2023, he signed for recently relegated Isthmian Premier Division club Cheshunt.

In June 2024, Noel-Williams joined Southern Premier Division Central club Bedford Town.

== International career ==
Born in England, Noel-Williams is of Grenadian descent. He was called up to represent the Grenada national football team for matches in June 2021. He debuted for Grenada in a 1–0 2022 FIFA World Cup qualification defeat to Antigua and Barbuda on 4 June 2021.

== Personal life ==
Noel-Williams is the son of the football manager and former footballer Gifton Noel-Williams.

On 3 June 2025, he was announced as an original islander on series 12 of Love Island. During his time on the show, he received a "wave of hate" due to his actions and the controversy surrounding him in the villa.

== Career statistics ==
As of match played 18 February 2023.

Club	Season	League			National Cup		League Cup		Other		Total	
Club	Season	Division	Apps	Goals	Apps	Goals	Apps	Goals	Apps	Goals	Apps	Goals
Oxford United	2017–18	League One	0	0	—		0	0	0	0	0	0
Oxford United	2018–19	League One	0	0	—		0	0	0	0	0	0
Oxford United	Total		0	0	—		0	0	0	0	0	0
Aylesbury United (loan)	2017–18	Southern League Division One East	2	1	3	0	—		0	0	5	1
North Leigh (loan)	2017–18	Southern League Division One West	4	2	—		—		0	0	4	2
Chesham United (loan)	2018–19	Southern League Premier Division South	2	0	2	1	—		1 (Note: Appearance in the Southern League Cup)	1	5	2
Slough Town (loan)	2018–19	National League South	3	0	—		—		—		3	0
Gloucester City (loan)	2018–19	National League South	8	2	—		—		—		8	2
Wealdstone	2019–20	National League South	6	3	—		—		1 (Note: Appearance in the FA Trophy)	0	7	3
Hayes & Yeading United (loan)	2019–20	Southern League Premier Division South	3	1	2	1	—		0	0	5	2
Billericay Town	2019–20	National League South	8	1	—		—		—		8	1
Guadalajara	2020–21	3ª – Group 18	2	0	0	0	—		—		2	0
Hemel Hempstead Town	2021–22	National League South	2	0	0	0	—		—		2	0
Gloucester City	2021–22	National League North	9	0	0	0	—		1	0	10	0
Braintree Town	2021–22	National League South	16	0	—		—		—		16	0
Potters Bar Town	2022–23	Isthmian League Premier Division	18	6	1	0	—		2 (Note: One appearance in the FA Trophy, one appearance and two goals in the Alan Turvey Trophy)	2	21	8
Career total			83	16	8	2	0	0	5	3	96	21
