= Kevin Briceño =

Costa Rican footballer (born 1991)

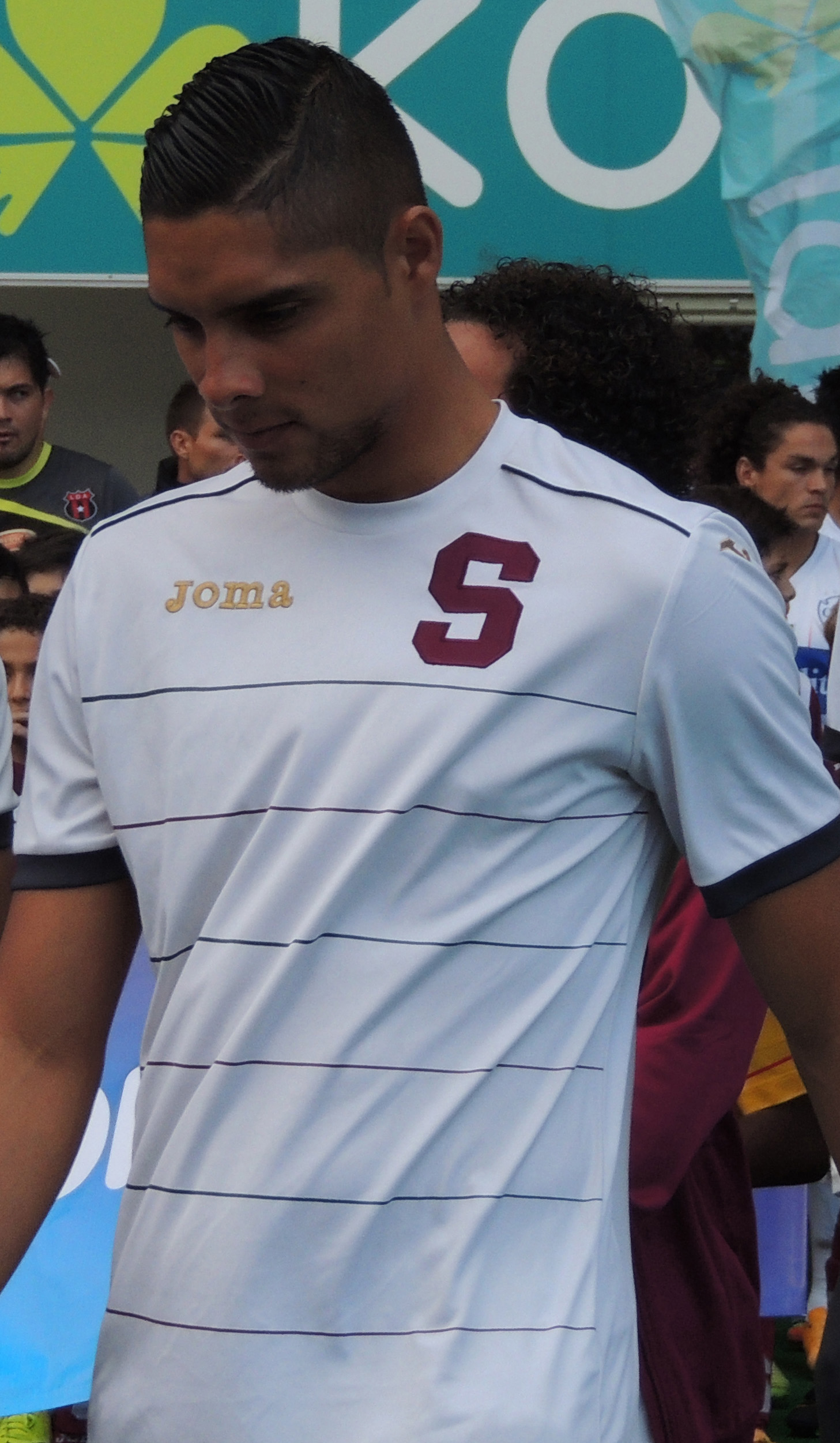
- Briceño with Saprissa in 2015

Personal information
- Full name: Kevin Andres Briceño Toruño
- Date of birth: 21 October 1991 (age 35)
- Place of birth: Nicoya, Costa Rica
- Height: 1.86 m (6 ft 1 in)
- Position: Goalkeeper

Team information
- Current team: Cartaginés
- Number: 1

Senior career*
Years	Team	Apps	(Gls)
2010–2011	Brujas	0	(0)
2011–2012	Orión	8	(0)
2012–2014	Uruguay	40	(0)
2014–2020	Saprissa	83	(0)
2020–2021	Jicaral	36	(0)
2021–	Cartaginés	134	(0)

International career^{‡}
2011	Costa Rica U22	5	(0)
2018–	Costa Rica	1	(0)
- * Club domestic league appearances and goals as of 7 May 2025 ‡ National team caps and goals as of 13 September 2018 (UTC)

Kevin Andres Briceño Toruño (born 21 October 1991) is a Costa Rican professional footballer who plays a goalkeeper for Liga FPD club Cartaginés.

== Club career ==
Born in Nicoya, Briceño started his senior professional career with Brujas in 2010 and moved to Orión in the following year. In 2012, he made his league debut against Limón. After a stint with CS Uruguay, he moved to Deportivo Saprissa in May 2014 as a replacement for the departing Luis Ernesto Michel. After regularly playing for the club, manager Jeaustin Campos announced on 22 November that Briceño would be benched for the rest of the season and act as a second fiddle to Danny Carvajal.

By the beginning of 2015–16 season, Briceño fell further down the order and became the third choice goalkeeper of the club. In June 2016, he suffered a shoulder dislocation. He underwent an operation and was ruled out of play for the remainder of the year.

From the beginning of 2017–18 season, Briceño became an undisputed starter for the club. After a second operation in the same shoulder, Briceño left the club in June 2020.

== International career ==
Briceño was called to the under-20 team for 2011 FIFA U-20 World Cup. In 2013, he was called to the senior national team for a friendly match against Uruguay. In October 2017, he was called to the senior team for a match against Panama as a replacement for the injured Keylor Navas. However, he remained at the bench and did not make an appearance.

On 28 August 2018, Briceño was called to the national team for friendlies against Japan and South Korea. On 11 September, he made his debut, coming on as a 46th-minute substitute for Leonel Moreira in a 3–0 defeat against Japan.
