= Ambroise Félicitet =

Martiniquais footballer (born 1993)

Personal information
- Full name: Ambroise Nelson Félicitet
- Date of birth: 29 May 1993 (age 33)
- Place of birth: Martinique
- Position: Defender

Team information
- Current team: Aiglon du Lamentin
- Number: 3

Senior career*
Years	Team	Apps	(Gls)
2017–2018	Rivière-Pilote		
2018–	Aiglon du Lamentin		

International career^{‡}
2019–	Martinique	1	(0)
- * Club domestic league appearances and goals as of 03:44, 6 July 2021 (UTC) ‡ National team caps and goals as of 03:44, 6 July 2021 (UTC)

Ambroise Nelson Félicitet (born 29 May 1993) is a Martiniquais professional footballer who plays as a defender for the club Aiglon du Lamentin, and the Martinique national team.

== International career ==
Reuperné debuted with the Martinique national team in a 1–1 CONCACAF Nations League loss to Trinidad and Tobago on 6 September 2019. He was called up to represent Martinique at the 2021 CONCACAF Gold Cup.
