= Dennis Taylor (footballer) =

Haitian footballer (born 1990)

Personal information
- Date of birth: 5 May 1990 (age 36)
- Place of birth: Jamaica
- Height: 1.89 m (6 ft 2 in)
- Position: Goalkeeper

Team information
- Current team: Humble Lions

Senior career*
Years	Team	Apps	(Gls)
2011–2019	Reno	101	(0)
2019–	Humble Lions	24	(0)

International career^{‡}
2020–	Jamaica	2	(0)
- * Club domestic league appearances and goals as of 03:44, 6 July 2021 (UTC) ‡ National team caps and goals as of 03:44, 6 July 2021 (UTC)

Dennis Taylor (born 5 May 1990) is a Jamaican professional footballer who plays as a goalkeeper for the club Humble Lions and the Jamaica national team.

== International career ==
Taylor debuted with the Jamaica national team in a 2–0 friendly win over Bermuda on 11 May 2020. He was called up to represent Jamaica at the 2021 CONCACAF Gold Cup.
