= Dimitri Ramothe =

Guadeloupean footballer (born 1990)

Personal information
- Date of birth: 8 September 1990 (age 36)
- Place of birth: Baie-Mahault, Guadeloupe
- Position: Midfielder

Senior career*
Years	Team	Apps	(Gls)
2016–	Amical Club Marie Galante		

International career^{‡}
2019–	Guadeloupe	11	(4)
- * Club domestic league appearances and goals ‡ National team caps and goals as of 23 June 2025

Dimitri Ramothe is a French footballer who plays for plays as striker for the Guadeloupe football team.

== International career ==
Ramothe made his debut for Guadeloupe team on 7 September 2019, in a 2019–20 CONCACAF Nations League C match against Sint Maarten. He scored the first goal of the game in the sixth minute, and Guadeloupe went on to win 5–1. Ramothe went on to play in all of Guadeloupe's Nations League matches that campaign, and finished with three goals as Guadeloupe went undefeated, being promoted to League B for the next edition and advancing to the first round of the 2021 CONCACAF Gold Cup Qualifiers.

== Career statistics ==
=== International ===
Guadeloupe national team
Year	Apps	Goals
2019	4	3
2021	3	1
2022	2	0

=== International goals ===
Scores and results list Guadeloupe's goal tally first
No.	Date	Venue	Opponent	Score	Result	Competition
1	7 September 2019	Stade René Serge Nabajoth, Les Abymes, Guadeloupe	Sint Maarten	1-0	5-1	2019–20 CONCACAF Nations League C
2	17 November 2019	Stade René Serge Nabajoth, Les Abymes, Guadeloupe	Turks and Caicos Islands	4-0	10-0	2019–20 CONCACAF Nations League C
3	17 November 2019	Stade René Serge Nabajoth, Les Abymes, Guadeloupe	Turks and Caicos Islands	8-0	10-0	2019–20 CONCACAF Nations League C
4	26 March 2022	Stade Robert Bobin, Bondoufle, France	Martinique	3-4	3-4	Friendly
