= Ishan Kort =

Sint Maartener footballer

Personal information
- Full name: Ishan Ernesto Arturo Kort
- Date of birth: 1 June 2000 (age 26)
- Place of birth: Philipsburg, Netherlands Antilles
- Height: 1.92 m (6 ft 4 in)
- Position: Goalkeeper

Team information
- Current team: FK Be1
- Number: 50

Youth career
- 2014–2017: Zeeburgia
- 2017–2019: Twente

Senior career*
Years	Team	Apps	(Gls)
2019–2021	Jong Almere City	3	(0)
2021–2023	Jong Sparta Rotterdam	26	(0)
2023–2025	FK Be1	27	(0)
2025	Hebar	7	(0)
2025–	FK Be1	10	(0)

International career^{‡}
2021	Suriname	1	(0)
2026–	Sint Maarten	6	(0)
- * Club domestic league appearances and goals as of 10:17, 7 April 2026 (UTC) ‡ National team caps and goals as of 17 November 2026

Ishan Ernesto Arturo Kort (born 1 June 2000) is a Sint Maartener professional footballer who plays as a goalkeeper for Lithuanian I Lyga club FK Be1 and the Sint Maarten national team. He also made one appearance for the Suriname national team in 2021.

== Club career ==
A former youth academy player of Zeeburgia and Twente, Kort joined Almere City in September 2019. He initially joined under-21 team of the club, which played in Derde Divisie, the fourth tier of football in the Netherlands. He made his debut on 21 September 2019 in a 2–1 league defeat against ODIN '59.

On 27 July 2023, Kort joined Lithuanian club Be1 NFA.

== International career ==
=== Suriname ===
Born in the Netherlands Antilles, Kort was given green light by FIFA to represent Suriname. In March 2021, he received his first call-up to the Suriname national team for World Cup qualifying matches against Cayman Islands and Aruba. He made his international debut on 24 March 2021 in a 3–0 win against Cayman Islands.

In June 2021, Kort was named in Suriname's squad for the 2021 CONCACAF Gold Cup. In June 2025, he was named in the squad for the 2025 CONCACAF Gold Cup.

=== Sint Maarten ===
In September 2026, Kort received his first call-up to the Sint Maarten national team.

== Personal life ==
Kort is the younger brother of footballer Imar Kort.

== Career statistics ==
=== International ===
As of match played 17 November 2026

National team	Year	Apps	Goals
Suriname	2021	1	0
Suriname	2022	0	0
Suriname	2023	0	0
Suriname	2024	0	0
Suriname	2025	0	0
Suriname	Total	1	0
Sint Maarten	2026	6	0
Career total		7	0
