= Kévin Malpon =

Guadeloupean footballer (born 1996)

Kevin Malpon
Personal information
- Full name: Kevin Edwing Malpon
- Date of birth: 1 March 1996 (age 30)
- Place of birth: Le Lamentin, Martinique
- Height: 1.77 m (5 ft 10 in)
- Position: Defensive midfielder

Team information
- Current team: Canet Roussillon
- Number: 6

Youth career
- 2012–2014: La Gauloise

Senior career*
Years	Team	Apps	(Gls)
2014	Roeselare	0	(0)
2014–2017	Mladá Boleslav	7	(0)
2019	FC Vereya	0	(0)
2018–2020	Versailles 78	27	(0)
2020–2021	AS Gosier	0	(0)
2021–2023	Alberes Argelès	43	(3)
2023–	Canet Roussillon	24	(0)

International career
2014–2021	Guadeloupe	8	(0)
- * Club domestic league appearances and goals as of 17:51, 26 September 2024 (UTC)

Kevin Edwing Malpon (born 1 March 1996) is a Guadeloupean professional footballer who plays as a defensive midfielder for Canet Roussillon. He made eight appearances for the Guadeloupe national team.

== Career ==
Malpon made his league debut for Mladá Boleslav on 26 July 2015 in a 4–2 Czech First League away loss at Slovan Liberec.
