= Colman Makouké =

Guadeloupean footballer (born 1990)

Personal information
- Full name: Colman Jason Makouké
- Date of birth: 7 June 1990 (age 36)
- Place of birth: Colombes, France
- Height: 1.85 m (6 ft 1 in)
- Position: Centre-back

Team information
- Current team: Juventus Sainte-Anne

Senior career*
Years	Team	Apps	(Gls)
2009–2011	Intrepide Sainte-Anne		
2011–	Juventus Sainte-Anne		

International career^{‡}
2015–	Guadeloupe	1	(0)
- * Club domestic league appearances and goals as of 03:44, 6 July 2021 (UTC) ‡ National team caps and goals as of 03:44, 6 July 2021 (UTC)

Colman Jason Makouké (born 7 June 1990) is a Guadeloupean professional footballer who plays as a centre-back for the club Juventus Sainte-Anne, and the Guadeloupe national team.

== International career ==
Makouké debuted with the Guadeloupe national team in a 2–0 friendly loss to Martinique on 26 December 2015. He was called up to represent Guadeloupe at the 2021 CONCACAF Gold Cup.
