= Kévin Ajax =

Guadeloupean footballer (born 1987)

Personal information
- Date of birth: 31 August 1987 (age 39)
- Place of birth: Basse-Terre, Guadeloupe
- Height: 1.89 m (6 ft 2 in)
- Position: Goalkeeper

Team information
- Current team: Moulien

Senior career*
| Years | Team | Apps | (Gls) |
| 2011–2013 | Vieux-Habitants | | |
| 2015– | Moulien | | |

International career^{‡}
| 2017– | Guadeloupe | 7 | (0) |
- * Club domestic league appearances and goals as of 03:44, 6 July 2021 (UTC) ‡ National team caps and goals as of 03:44, 6 July 2021 (UTC)

Kévin Ajax (born 31 August 1987) is a Guadeloupean professional footballer who plays as a goalkeeper for the club Moulien, and the Guadeloupe national team.

== International career ==
Ajax debuted with the Guadeloupe national team in a 4–1 friendly loss to Martinique on 26 June 2017. He was called up to represent Guadeloupe at the 2021 CONCACAF Gold Cup.
