= Yael López =

Costa Rican football player (born 1998)

Personal information
- Full name: Yael Andrés López Fuentes
- Date of birth: 17 December 1998 (age 27)
- Place of birth: Alajuela, Costa Rica
- Height: 1.80 m (5 ft 11 in)
- Position: Right-back

Team information
- Current team: Boyacá Chicó
- Number: 22

Youth career
- Carmelita

Senior career*
Years	Team	Apps	(Gls)
2017–2022	Carmelita	48	(3)
2019–2020	→ Saprissa (loan)	14	(0)
2020–2021	→ Herediano (loan)	37	(1)
2022	→ Alajuelense (loan)	20	(0)
2022–2024	Alajuelense	58	(1)
2024	Guanacasteca	18	(1)
2025–	Boyacá Chicó	13	(0)

International career^{‡}
2021–	Costa Rica	2	(0)
- * Club domestic league appearances and goals as of 14 August 2025 ‡ National team caps and goals as of 2 February 2024

Yael Andrés López Fuentes (born 17 December 1998) is a Costa Rican professional footballer who plays as a right-back for Colombian club Boyacá Chicó.

== Career ==
Lopez and teammate Jose Alfaro joined Saprissa on loan following Carmelita's relegation, with the deal being confirmed on 3 June 2019. He made his debut for Saprissa on 20 July 2019 against the defending champions A.D. San Carlos. He was part of the team that triumphed in the 2019 CONCACAF League winning the final against F.C. Motagua of Honduras.

== International career ==
He was selected for Costa Rica squad for the 2021 CONCACAF Gold Cup and made his debut on 20 July 2021 in a game against Jamaica.

== Honours ==
Saprissa

- CONCACAF League: 2019
- Liga FPD: Clausura 2020
