= Kelly Irep =

Footballer (born 1995)

Personal information
- Full name: Kelly Marvin Irep
- Date of birth: 1 September 1995 (age 31)
- Place of birth: Mantes-la-Jolie, France
- Height: 1.83 m (6 ft 0 in)
- Position: Left-back

Team information
- Current team: Granville
- Number: 13

Youth career
- 2008–2014: Mantes

Senior career*
Years	Team	Apps	(Gls)
2014–2015	Caen B	19	(1)
2015–2017	Raon-l'Étape	37	(2)
2017–2018	Concarneau	31	(1)
2018–2020	Le Havre B	9	(0)
2018–2020	Le Havre	0	(0)
2019	→ Lyon-Duchère (loan)	8	(0)
2019–2020	→ Bourg-en-Bresse (loan)	14	(0)
2020–2021	Enosis Neon Paralimni	22	(0)
2021–2022	Créteil	6	(0)
2021	Créteil B	2	(0)
2022–2023	Raon-l'Étape	20	(0)
2023–2024	Plabennec	20	(1)
2024–	Granville	10	(1)

International career^{‡}
2018–	Guadeloupe	8	(0)
- * Club domestic league appearances and goals as of 30 November 2024 ‡ National team caps and goals as of 20:47, 17 September 2023 (UTC)

Kelly Marvin Irep (born 1 September 1995) is a professional footballer who plays as a left-back for Championnat National 1 club Granville. Born in metropolitan France, he plays for the Guadeloupe national team.

== Club career ==
After beginning his early career in the lower divisions of France, Irep signed a professional contract with Le Havre on 8 January 2018. He made his senior debut for Le Havre in a 2–0 Coupe de la Ligue win over Bourg-en-Bresse on 14 August 2018. He was loaned in January 2019 until June 2019 to Lyon-Duchère.

In July 2021, Irep returned to France and signed with Créteil. He signed for Plabennec in 2023.

== International career ==
Irep was called up to the Guadeloupe national team for CONCACAF Nations League match against Curaçao on 19 November 2018. He made his debut for the squad in that game, as a starter, which Guadeloupe lost with the score of 0–6.
