= Ryan Koolwijk =

Surinamese football manager (born 1985)

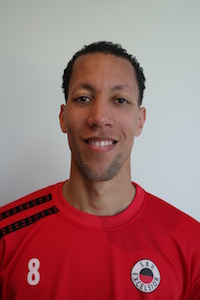
- Koolwijk with Excelsior in 2017

Personal information
- Date of birth: 8 August 1985 (age 41)
- Place of birth: Rotterdam, Netherlands
- Height: 1.94 m (6 ft 4 in)
- Position: Midfielder

Team information
- Current team: Suriname (assistant); ADO Den Haag (U19 assistant)

Youth career
- VV Lekkerkerk
- Excelsior

Senior career*
Years	Team	Apps	(Gls)
2007–2011	Excelsior	114	(10)
2011–2014	NEC	86	(5)
2014	Dordrecht	9	(2)
2015–2016	AS Trenčín	43	(6)
2016–2019	Excelsior	92	(7)
2019–2020	AS Trenčín	20	(2)
2020–2021	Almere City	38	(1)
2021–2022	PEC Zwolle	9	(0)
2022–2024	Smitshoek		
Total		411+	(33+)

International career
2021–2022	Suriname	7	(0)

Managerial career
- 2022–: Suriname (assistant)
- 2024–: ADO Den Haag (U19 assistant)
- * Club domestic league appearances and goals

Ryan Koolwijk (born 8 August 1985) is a professional football manager and former player who is the assistant coach of the Suriname national team and the ADO Den Haag under-19 team.

During his playing career, he played for Excelsior, NEC, Dordrecht, AS Trenčín, Almere City, and PEC Zwolle. Born in the Netherlands, he represented the Suriname national team.

== Club career ==
Born in Rotterdam, Koolwijk began his senior career with Excelsior during the 2007–08 season. He signed for NEC in May 2011. He also played for Dordrecht and AS Trenčín, before returning to Excelsior in May 2016. He returned to Trenčín in June 2019 and became a regular in the team's starting eleven. In April 2020, when the Fortuna Liga was suspended due to the COVID-19 pandemic in the country, Koolwijk ended his contract with the club by mutual agreement, as he intended to spend more time with his family in the Netherlands and he was dissatisfied by the proposed salary cut of over 50%, due to the pandemic. He signed with Almere City in May 2020.

He signed for PEC Zwolle in September 2021. After a season, which ended with relegation to the 2022–23 Eerste Divisie, 36-year old Koolwijk announced his retirement from professional football, as he had accepted a job offer as assistant coach of the Suriname national team.

At age 36, Koolwijk opted to continue playing and joined Smitshoek in the Vierde Divisie ahead of the 2022–23 season, encouraged by friend Luigi Bruins, who highlighted the club's positive environment. Koolwijk spent two seasons at Smitshoek before retiring from playing in June 2024 to focus on his coaching career.

== International career ==
Born in the Netherlands, Koolwijk is of Surinamese descent. He debuted with the Suriname national team in a 6–0 2022 FIFA World Cup qualification win over Bermuda on 4 June 2021. On 25 June Koolwijk was named to the Suriname squad for the 2021 CONCACAF Gold Cup.

== Coaching career ==
Koolwijk retired as a professional player in 2022, and became an assistant coach of the Suriname national team.

He continued to play in the lower leagues, and after retiring from playing in 2024, Koolwijk was appointed assistant coach of ADO Den Haag's under-19s.

== Career statistics ==
As of match played 14 May 2017

Appearances and goals by club, season and competition
Club	Season	League			National Cup		Other		Total	
Club	Season	Division	Apps	Goals	Apps	Goals	Apps	Goals	Apps	Goals
Excelsior	2007–08	Eredivisie	7	0	0	0	0	0	7	0
Excelsior	2008–09	Eerste Divisie	37	3	1	0	2 (Note: Appearances in the Eerste Divisie promotion play-offs)	0	40	3
Excelsior	2009–10	Eerste Divisie	37	6	1	0	4	0	42	6
Excelsior	2010–11	Eredivisie	33	1	2	0	4 (Note: Appearances in the Eredivisie relegation play-offs)	2	39	3
Excelsior	Total		114	10	4	0	10	2	128	12
N.E.C.	2011–12	Eredivisie	35	0	4	0	0	0	39	0
N.E.C.	2012–13	Eredivisie	31	4	1	0	0	0	32	4
N.E.C.	2013–14	Eredivisie	22	1	4	0	2	1	28	2
N.E.C.	Total		88	5	9	0	2	1	99	6
Dordrecht	2014–15	Eredivisie	9	2	2	1	0	0	11	3
Trenčín	2014–15	Slovak First Football League	13	1	3	1	0	0	16	2
Trenčín	2015–16	Slovak First Football League	30	5	6	3	2 (Note: Appearances in the Europa League)	0	38	8
Trenčín	Total		43	6	9	4	2	0	54	10
Excelsior	2016–17	Eredivisie	32	2	2	0	0	0	34	2
Excelsior	2017–18	Eredivisie	0	0	0	0	0	0	0	0
Excelsior	Total		32	2	2	0	0	0	34	2
Career total			286	25	26	5	14	3	326	33
