= Thomas Pineau =

Guadeloupean footballer (born 1991)

Personal information
- Full name: Thomas Sébastien Pineau
- Date of birth: 31 January 1991 (age 35)
- Place of birth: Pointe-à-Pitre, Guadeloupe
- Position: Left-back

Team information
- Current team: Solidarité-Scolaire

Youth career
- Pointe-à-Pitre
- Caen

Senior career*
| Years | Team | Apps | (Gls) |
| 2018– | Solidarité-Scolaire | | |

International career^{‡}
| 2021– | Guadeloupe | 2 | (0) |
- * Club domestic league appearances and goals as of 03:44, 6 July 2021 (UTC) ‡ National team caps and goals as of 03:44, 6 July 2021 (UTC)

Thomas Sébastien Pineau (born 31 January 1991) is a Guadeloupean professional footballer who plays as a left-back for the club Solidarité-Scolaire and the Guadeloupe national team.

== Career ==
Pineau was a youth product of his local club Pointe-à-Pitre and Caen, but retired as a youth due to injuries. He went to Belgium to study physiotherapy, and thereafter worked as a physiotherapist. In January 2018, he was hired to work as physiotherapist with the Guadeloupe national team by the manager Jocelyn Angloma. He trained and performed regularly with the national team, and his skill caught the attention of Angloma who convinced him to pick up football again and join the national team as a player. At the age of 30, he retired as a physiotherapist to focus on football full-time.

== International career ==
Pineau debuted with the Guadeloupe national team in a 2–0 2021 CONCACAF Gold Cup qualification win over Bahamas on 2 July 2021. He was called up to represent Guadeloupe at the 2021 CONCACAF Gold Cup.
