= Ivenzo Comvalius =

Surinamese footballer (born 1997)

Personal information
- Full name: Ivenzo Ricky Comvalius
- Date of birth: 24 June 1997 (age 29)
- Place of birth: Paramaribo, Suriname
- Position: Forward

Team information
- Current team: Notch
- Number: 7

Youth career
- Transvaal

Senior career*
Years	Team	Apps	(Gls)
2015–2019	Transvaal		
2019–2021	AS Trenčín	20	(1)
2021	→ Dugopolje (loan)	6	(0)
2022–2023	Lorca Deportiva	6	(1)
2024–2025	Nijkerk		
2025–2026	Sparta Nijkerk		
2026–	Notch		

International career^{‡}
2018–2022	Suriname	18	(8)
- * Club domestic league appearances and goals as of 22 September 2024 ‡ National team caps and goals as of 17 July 2021

Ivenzo Ricky Comvalius (born on 24 June 1997), is a Surinamese professional footballer who plays as a forward for SML club Notch and the Surinamese national team.

== Club career ==
Comvalius had a trial with Dutch club Almere City in 2018. In summer 2019, he joined AS Trenčín of the Fortuna Liga on a three-year deal. Comvalius made his debut by starting in a 1–1 draw against Ružomberok. He was replaced in the 73rd minute by Milan Corryn. Comvalius scored the equalizer against Spartak Trnava, that ended in a 2–1 win, marking his first official goal for the club.

== International career ==
Comvalius was named to Suriname's squad for the 2021 CONCACAF Gold Cup on 25 June 2021.

== Career statistics ==
Scores and results list Suriname's goal tally first.

No.	Date	Venue	Opponent	Score	Result	Competition
1.	18 August 2018	Stade de Baduel, Cayenne, French Guiana	French Guiana	1–0	4–0	Friendly
2.	18 August 2018	Stade de Baduel, Cayenne, French Guiana	French Guiana	2–0	4–0	Friendly
3.	18 August 2018	Stade de Baduel, Cayenne, French Guiana	French Guiana	3–0	4–0	Friendly
4.	13 October 2018	André Kamperveen Stadion, Paramaribo, Suriname	British Virgin Islands	5–0	5–0	2019–20 CONCACAF Nations League qualification
5.	16 March 2019	Ashraf Pierkhan Stadion, Nieuw Nickerie, Suriname	Guyana	2–0	3–1	Friendly
6.	23 March 2019	André Kamperveen Stadion, Paramaribo, Suriname	Saint Kitts and Nevis	2–0	2–0	2019–20 CONCACAF Nations League qualification
7.	8 September 2019	André Kamperveen Stadion, Paramaribo, Suriname	Nicaragua	6–0	6–0	2019–20 CONCACAF Nations League B
8.	18 November 2019	Nicaragua National Football Stadium, Managua, Nicaragua	Nicaragua	1–0	2–1	2019–20 CONCACAF Nations League B
