= Vikash Tillé =

Guadeloupean footballer (born 1997)

Personal information
- Full name: Vikash Oyane Tillé
- Date of birth: 26 November 1997 (age 28)
- Place of birth: Saint-François, Guadeloupe
- Position: Winger

Team information
- Current team: Moulien

Senior career*
Years	Team	Apps	(Gls)
2016–2018	Juventus Sainte-Anne		
2018–	Moulien	39	(30)

International career^{‡}
2016–	Guadeloupe	20	(3)
- * Club domestic league appearances and goals as of 6 July 2025 ‡ National team caps and goals as of 6 July 2025

Vikash Oyane Tillé (born 26 November 1997) is a Guadeloupean professional footballer who plays as a winger for the club Moulien and the Guadeloupe national team.

== International career ==
Tillé debuted with the Guadeloupe national team in a 5–1 CONCACAF Nations League win over Sint Maarten on 7 September 2019. He was called up to represent Guadeloupe at the 2021 CONCACAF Gold Cup.
