= Morgan Saint-Maximin =

Guadeloupean footballer (born August 02 1997)

Personal information
- Full name: Morgan Michel Saint-Maximin
- Date of birth: 2 August 1997 (age 29)
- Place of birth: Les Abymes, Guadeloupe
- Height: 1.71 m (5 ft 7 in)
- Position: Midfielder

Team information
- Current team: Solidarité-Scolaire

Senior career*
Years	Team	Apps	(Gls)
2017– 2025	Solidarité-Scolaire		

International career^{‡}
2021–	Guadeloupe	16	(0)
- * Club domestic league appearances and goals as of 03:44, 6 July 2021 (UTC) ‡ National team caps and goals as of 03:44, 6 July 2021 (UTC)

Morgan Michel Saint-Maximin (born 2 August 1997) is a Guadeloupean professional footballer who plays as a midfielder for the club Solidarité-Scolaire and the Guadeloupe team.

== International career ==
Saint-Maximin debuted with the Guadeloupe team in a 2–1 friendly win over Martinique on 23 June 2021. He was called up to represent Guadeloupe at the 2021 CONCACAF Gold Cup. Nations League B campaign 2023 Nations League A Campaign 2024
