= Nicklas Frenderup =

Trinidad and Tobago footballer (born 1992)

Personal information
- Full name: Nicklas Bruus Jensen Frenderup
- Date of birth: 14 December 1992 (age 33)
- Place of birth: Copenhagen, Denmark
- Height: 1.83 m (6 ft 0 in)
- Position: Goalkeeper

Senior career*
Years	Team	Apps	(Gls)
2011–2012	Ringsted		
2012–2013	Rishøj		
2013–2014	Greve		
2014–2015	Egedal		
2015–2018	Florø	84	(0)
2018	Sandnes Ulf	12	(0)
2019	Køge	0	(0)
2019–2021	Stjørdals-Blink	35	(0)
2021–2024	Ranheim	42	(0)
2021	→ Bryne (loan)	14	(0)

International career^{‡}
2019–	Trinidad and Tobago	11	(0)
- * Club domestic league appearances and goals as of 6 December 2023 ‡ National team caps and goals as of 5 July 2021

Nicklas Frenderup (born 14 December 1992) is a professional footballer who plays as goalkeeper. Born and raised in Denmark, he represents Trinidad and Tobago internationally.

== Club career ==
After tenures in the Danish third and fourth-tier clubs Ringsted, Rishøj, Greve and Egedal, he moved to Norway in 2015 to start a career there. He signed for third-tier Florø and eventually secured promotion to the 2017 1. divisjon. In mid-2018 he was signed by fellow second-tier club Sandnes Ulf. After the 2018 1. divisjon concluded, he returned to Denmark and HB Køge, only to join Norwegian third-tier club Stjørdals-Blink in the summer of 2019. They too won promotion.

== International career ==
Born to a Danish father and a Trinidadian mother. In November 2018, Frenderup received his first call-up to the Trinidad and Tobago national team. He made his international debut a year later, coming on as a substitute in 15–0 win over Anguilla.
