= Ronan Hauterville =

Guadeloupean footballer (born 1989)

Personal information
- Date of birth: 21 November 1989 (age 36)
- Place of birth: Basse-Terre, Guadeloupe
- Height: 1.89 m (6 ft 2 in)
- Position: Centre-back

Team information
- Current team: Phare Petit-Canal

Senior career*
Years	Team	Apps	(Gls)
2008–2010	Chantilly		
2010–2014	Creil		
2014–2015	Chantilly		
2016–2018	Siroco Les Abymes		
2018–	Phare Petit-Canal		

International career^{‡}
2017–	Guadeloupe	14	(2)
- * Club domestic league appearances and goals as of 03:44, 6 July 2021 (UTC) ‡ National team caps and goals as of 03:44, 6 July 2021 (UTC)

Ronan Hauterville (born 21 November 1989) is a Guadeloupean professional footballer who plays as a centre-back for the club Phare Petit-Canal and the Guadeloupe national team.

== International career ==
Hauterville debuted with the Guadeloupe national team in a 4–1 friendly loss to Martinique on 26 June 2017. He was called up to represent Guadeloupe at the 2021 CONCACAF Gold Cup.
