= Quentin Annette =

Guadeloupean footballer (born 1998)

Personal information
- Date of birth: 13 January 1998 (age 28)
- Place of birth: Les Abymes, Guadeloupe
- Position: Midfielder

Team information
- Current team: Club Franciscain
- Number: 14

Senior career*
Years	Team	Apps	(Gls)
2017–	Club Franciscain		

International career^{‡}
2019–	Guadeloupe	6	(0)
- * Club domestic league appearances and goals as of 03:44, 6 July 2021 (UTC) ‡ National team caps and goals as of 03:44, 6 July 2021 (UTC)

Quentin Annette (born 13 January 1998) is a Guadeloupean professional footballer who plays as a midfielder for the club Club Franciscain and the Guadeloupe national team.

== International career ==
Annette debuted with the Guadeloupe national team in a 5–1 CONCACAF Nations League win over Sint Maarten on 7 September 2019. He was called up to represent Guadeloupe at the 2021 CONCACAF Gold Cup.
