= Mavrick Annerose =

Guadeloupean footballer (born 1995)

Personal information
- Full name: Mavrick Pierre Annerose
- Date of birth: 29 November 1995 (age 30)
- Place of birth: Pointe-à-Pitre, Guadeloupe
- Height: 1.91 m (6 ft 3 in)
- Position: Winger

Team information
- Current team: USR

Senior career*
| Years | Team | Apps | (Gls) |
| 2015– | USR | | |

International career^{‡}
| 2016– | Guadeloupe | 9 | (0) |
- * Club domestic league appearances and goals as of 03:44, 6 July 2021 (UTC) ‡ National team caps and goals as of 03:44, 6 July 2021 (UTC)

Mavrick Pierre Annerose (born 29 November 1995) is a Guadeloupean professional footballer who plays as a winger for the club USR, and the Guadeloupe national team.

== International career ==
Annette debuted with the Guadeloupe national team in a 1–1 friendly Martinique on 6 February 2016. He was called up to represent Guadeloupe at the 2021 CONCACAF Gold Cup.
