= Anthony Baron =

Guadeloupean footballer (born 1992)

Personal information
- Full name: Anthony Kevin Baron
- Date of birth: 29 December 1992 (age 33)
- Place of birth: Villepinte, France
- Height: 1.80 m (5 ft 11 in)
- Position: Centre-back

Team information
- Current team: Yverdon-Sport
- Number: 6

Senior career*
Years	Team	Apps	(Gls)
2011–2012	Lormont	2	(0)
2012–2014	Bourges Foot	52	(3)
2014–2015	Chartres	26	(0)
2015–2016	Amiens II	22	(1)
2016–2017	Beauvais Oise	22	(0)
2017–2019	Saint-Pryvé	57	(0)
2019–2021	Stade Nyonnais	56	(3)
2021–2022	Yverdon Sport	0	(0)
2021–2022	→ Stade Nyonnais (Loan)	27	(3)
2022–2026	Servette U21	9	(1)
2022–2026	Servette	59	(2)
2026–	Yverdon-Sport	3	(0)

International career^{‡}
2018–	Guadeloupe	22	(2)
- * Club domestic league appearances and goals as of 28 September 2026 ‡ National team caps and goals as of 01:55, 1 July 2023 (UTC)

Anthony Kevin Baron (born 29 December 1992) is a professional footballer who plays as a left-back and a centre-back for Swiss Challenge League club Yverdon-Sport. Born in Metropolitan France, he plays for the Guadeloupe national team.

== Club career ==
Baron began his career with Lormont, and spent his early career with various semi-professional sides in France. He made appearances for Bourges Foot, FC Chartres, Amiens reserves, Beauvais Oise and Saint-Pryvé. In 2019, he proceeded to move to Switzerland and signed for Stade Nyonnais. On 16 June 2021, he signed a contract with Yverdon Sport in the Swiss Challenge League.

On 20 July 2022, Baron moved to Servette U21, the under-21 team of Servette, who were allowed to sign more experienced players.

== International career ==
Baron debuted for the Guadeloupe national team in a 0–0 CONCACAF Nations League tie with Aruba on 16 October 2018. He was likewise called up to represent Guadeloupe at the 2021 CONCACAF Gold Cup.

== Honours ==
Individual

- CONCACAF Gold Cup Goal of the Tournament: 2023
