= 2009–10 Coupe de France 1st round =

The 2009–10 Coupe de France is the 93rd season of the French most prestigious cup competition, organized by the French Football Federation, and is open to all clubs in French football, as well as clubs from the overseas departments and territories (Guadeloupe, French Guiana, Martinique, Mayotte, New Caledonia, French Polynesia, and Réunion). All of the teams that enter the competition, but were not members of Ligue 1 or Ligue 2, have to compete in the regional qualifying rounds. The regional qualifying rounds determine the number of regional clubs that will earn spots in the 7th round and normally lasts six rounds.

See 2009–10 Coupe de France for details of the rounds from the 7th Round onwards.

== Calendar ==
On 23 June 2009, the French Football Federation announced the calendar for the Coupe de France.

Round	First match date	Fixtures	Clubs	Notes
1st round	20 August 2009			
2nd round	6 September 2009			

All times in the following tables are CET unless otherwise noted.

== First round ==
=== Alsace ===
Alsace
Date	Kick off	Home	Result	Away
20 August	20:00	FC Breuschwickersheim	0 – 2	US Oberschaeffolsheim
21 August	20:00	SC Sélestat	1 – 3	FC Kogenheim
22 August	18:00	AS Offwiller	1 – 4	AS Gundershoffen
22 August	18:00	AS Sarrewerden	0 – 1	FC Keskastel
22 August	18:00	FC Heiteren	1 – 2	AS Herrlisheim
22 August	18:00	Uffheim FC	6 – 3	AS Hausgauen
22 August	19:00	USI Diemeringen	3 – 2	US Trois Maisons
22 August	19:00	SR Dorlisheim	3 – 7 a.e.t	Strasbourg Notre Dame SC
22 August	19:00	AS Hanhoffen	0 – 7	FCE Kaltenhouse
22 August	19:00	AS Willgottheim	3 – 0	ASL Duntzenheim
22 August	19:00	AS Riespach	1 – 2	Illfurth FC
22 August	19:30	AS Guemar	1 – 5	AS Volgelsheim
23 August	16:00	EB Achenheim	0 – 2	AS Erstein
23 August	16:00	FC Altenstadt	3 – 0	FC Rott
23 August	16:00	AS Altorf	0 – 2	AS Heiligenstein
23 August	16:00	FC Andlau	0 – 6	FC Matzenheim
23 August	16:00	FC Balbronn	0 – 7	AS Marlenheim
23 August	16:00	SS Beinheim		FR Sessenheim
23 August	16:00	AS Benfeld	4 – 3	FC Herbsheim
23 August	16:00	AS Bernardswill	4 – 1	AS Bergbieten
23 August	16:00	FC Boofzheim	–	SC Ebersheim
23 August	16:00	FA Bruche Barembach	2 – 4	FC Dangolsheim
23 August	16:00	AS Chatenois	3 – 2	FC Hilsenheim
23 August	16:00	US Dachstein	1 – 3	Olympique Strasbourg
23 August	16:00	FC Dahlenheim	1 – 3	FC Niederhausbergen
23 August	16:00	US Dalhunden	2 – 0	SC Roeschwoog
23 August	16:00	US Dambach la Ville	2 – 3	SR Zellwiller
23 August	16:00	FC Dauendorf	1 – 3	AS Uhrwiller
23 August	16:00	SC Dingsheim		ES Offendorf
23 August	16:00	Entente Drachenbronn-Birlenbach		US Niederbronn
23 August	16:00	USL Duppigheim	4 – 2 a.e.t	FC Eckbolsheim
23 August	16:00	FC Ebersmunster	1 – 5	US Baldenheim
23 August	16:00	US Eckwersheim	1 – 4	US Wittersheim
23 August	16:00	FC Entzheim	5 – 0	FC Wangen-Westhoffen
23 August	16:00	UJSF Epfig	0 – 7	FC Rossfeld
23 August	16:00	FC Ernolsheim les Saverne	0 – 8	AS Lupstein
23 August	16:00	FC Forstheim	2 – 13	AS Hatten
23 August	16:00	Red Star Froeschwiller	1 – 2 a.e.t	AC Hinterfeld
23 August	16:00	FC Geudertheim	1 – 7	US Turcs Bischwiller
23 August	16:00	FC Grendelbruch	4 – 3	AC Rosheim

=== Aquitaine ===
Aquitaine
Date	Kick off	Home	Result	Away
29 August	18:00	Mourenx Bourg	1 – 7	Seignosse FC
29 August	19:00	Parentis FC	5 – 1 a.e.t	AS Soustons
29 August	15:00	AV Mourenxois	1 – 0	Violette Aturine
30 August	15:00	Boucau Elan	2 – 1	FC Carresse Salies
30 August	15:00	Olympique Pardies	1 – 0	Labenne OSC
30 August	15:00	Lahonce Urcuit FC	1 – 5	Hasparren FC
30 August	15:00	Hendaye Eglantins	3 – 0	Peyrehorade Section
30 August	15:00	Vielle FC	1 – 3	AS Tarnos
30 August	15:00	CA Morcenx	1 – 2 a.e.t	SC SCALA
30 August	15:00	Bayonne Portugais	7 – 0	AM Taller
30 August	15:00	PST Tartas	1 – 2 a.e.t	Saint Vincent de Paul
30 August	15:00	Kamboko Izarra	0 – 1	AS Pontonx
30 August	15:00	Hagetmau FC	2 – 2; 4 - 3 pen.	Saint Laurent Biller
30 August	15:00	Nord est Béarn	4 – 5	Pau Bleuets
30 August	15:00	Meillon Assat Narc E	1 – 0	Saint Martin Gel
30 August	15:00	ES Montoise	1 – 2	Gan FC
30 August	15:00	ASMUR	1 – 0	JAB Pau
30 August	15:00	Saint Pierre du Mont	2 – 1	Jurancon
30 August	15:00	Lons FC	3 – 1	AS Siros
30 August	15:00	Stade Ygossais	3 – 0	US Pau Portugais
30 August	15:00	SA Saint Sever	0 – 1	Doazit FC
30 August	15:00	Vallee Ousse	1 – 3	Croises Béarn
30 August	15:00	Razac-le-Isle	4 – 4; 4 - 3 pen.	JS Saint Astier
30 August	15:00	RC La Laurence	2 – 1	US Galgon
30 August	15:00	AS Nontron	7 – 0	FC Vallee de la Isle
30 August	15:00	JS Saint-Seurin	4 – 1	Neuvic Saint Leon
30 August	15:00	F. Périgueux	1 – 4	Mouliets Cotes Cast.
30 August	15:00	CA Brantome	1 – 3	Mussidan Saint Med
30 August	15:00	Saint Aulaye Sports	2 – 0 a.e.t	ES Vayres
30 August	15:00	US Tocane Saint Apre	4 – 5	CA Riberac
30 August	15:00	Limens FC	1 – 0	US Saint Denis de Pile
30 August	15:00	AS Les Peintures	0 – 6	Pays de Montaigne
30 August	15:00	US Guitres	2 – 6	US Coutras
30 August	15:00	Petit Bersac FC2	3 – 0	La Thiberienne
30 August	15:00	US Aillas Auros	2 – 3	SC Cudos
30 August	15:00	SC Astaffort	0 – 1	Bazas Patronage
30 August	15:00	Gironde Reole FC	3 – 1	Nerac FC
30 August	15:00	Saint Symphorien	5 – 2	Pont DC Foulayro
30 August	15:00	Vallee Gamage FC	5 – 1	AS Pellegrue
30 August	15:00	US Fargues	3 – 3; 4 - 2 pen.	Saint Macaire
30 August	15:00	Portes Entre 2 Mers	9 – 0	Port Sainte Marie Feuga
30 August	15:00	FC Vallee Dordogne	2 – 5 a.e.t	Lamothe Mongauz
30 August	15:00	Villandraut Prechac	1 – 3 a.e.t	Creonnais C.
30 August	15:00	Caudrot Vaillante	0 – 4	Le Barp FC
30 August	15:00	FC Coteaux Bordelais	2 – 1	AS Sauveterre
30 August	15:00	US Roquefort	4 – 2 a.e.t	ES Verdelais
30 August	15:00	Casteljaloux FC	4 – 0	SC Cabanac
30 August	15:00	Savignac Joyeuse	1 – 3	Agen FC
30 August	15:00	Coteaux Libournais	2 – 0	AS Gensac Montcaret
30 August	15:00	JS Corgnac	3 – 3; 6 - 5 pen.	AS Monbahus
30 August	15:00	SU Damazan	0 – 1	3 Vallee Cours Pile FC
30 August	15:00	US Gontaud	2 – 1	US Virazeil
30 August	15:00	AS Limeyrat	2 – 4	Pays de Thenon FC
30 August	15:00	Miramont Lavergne	3 – 0	Tonneins FC
30 August	15:00	Belves FC	0 – 3	ASSA Pays du Dropt
30 August	15:00	ES Boulazac	2 – 0	Saint Crepin Salignac
30 August	15:00	Creysse Lembras	2 – 5	Antonne le Change
30 August	15:00	F. Casseneuil Av.	1 – 0	ES Montignacoise
30 August	15:00	Monbazillac Sigoules	3 – 1	Grignols Villamblard
30 August	15:00	Vergt FC	3 – 4 a.e.t	Chateau le Eveque
30 August	15:00	SC Ares	2 – 1 a.e.t	ES Eysines
30 August	15:00	AS Saint Aubin de Medoc	4 – 6 a.e.t	US Izon
30 August	15:00	Berson Canesse	1 – 2	ES Canejan
30 August	15:00	Olympique Cazaux	4 – 2	Stade Blaye
30 August	15:00	Estuaire Haute Gironde	2 – 0	Saint Loubes FC
30 August	15:00	Belin Beliet FC	2 – 9	Facture Biganos
30 August	15:00	Saint Sulpice Cameyrac	2 – 0	ES Audenge
30 August	15:00	ES Bruges	0 – 1	JS Le Teich
30 August	15:00	FC La Teste	2 – 1	AS Bourgeais
30 August	15:00	AS Le Haillan	1 – 2	Saint Andre Cubzac
30 August	15:00	USC Leognan	1 – 2	Coqs Rouges Bx
30 August	15:00	Saint Bruno Union	4 – 0	SC Bastidienne
30 August	15:00	CM Floirac	2 – 3	AGJA Cauderan
30 August	15:00	ASM Clermont Auvergne	0 – 2	RC Podensac
30 August	15:00	CS Portugais	0 – 1	CMO Bassens
30 August	15:00	Avensan Moulis	0 – 6	Stade Saint Medardais
30 August	15:00	SC Madagascar Amical	0 – 3	SC Cadaujac
30 August	15:00	Olympique Cerons	5 – 3	B.E.C.
30 August	15:00	US Martillac	3 – 1	Landrias Fraternelle
30 August	15:00	CA Begles	3 – 0	Targon-Soulig
30 August	15:00	Carriet Ac.	1 – 2	Landes Girondines F.
30 August	15:00	ES Ambaresienne	2 – 1	US Bouscat
30 August	15:00	Medoc Atlantique	3 – 4	US Talence
30 August	15:00	CMS Hautmedoc	1 – 3	Hourtin Naujac FC
30 August	15:00	SJ Macau	4 – 0	Medoc Ocean FC
30 August	15:00	RC Chambéry	3 – 0	AS Beautiran
30 August	15:00	ASC Mayotte	0 – 3	AC Bordeaux
30 August	15:00	Pierroton Cestas	1 – 0	CA Sainte Helene

=== Pays de la Loire Atlantique ===
Pays de la Loire Atlantique
Date	Kick off	Home	Result	Away
30 August	15:00	ES Saint Lanbert Potherie	1 – 3	FC Belligne Saint Sauvier
30 August	15:00	AS Preux Saint Herbla	0 – 3	Saint Julien de Concelles
30 August	15:00	EF du Fuilet	2 – 7	SV La Meignanne
30 August	15:00	Conquérante Couffé	1 – 7	OS Nozay
30 August	15:00	AS Chaze Vern Anjou	2 – 2; 5 - 6 pen.	Saint Gereon Reveil
30 August	15:00	USTV 99	0 – 0; 4 - 5 pen.	AL Chateaubriant
30 August	15:00	Landreau Loroux OSC	0 – 0; 3 - 1 pen.	JA La Pommeraye
30 August	15:00	Teil.Mouz.Lig	1 – 2	US Soudan
30 August	15:00	Saint Michel Previere	0 – 3	Erbray Jeunes
30 August	15:00	US Combre Noyant	2 – 1	CAVUSG
30 August	15:00	SV La Tourlandry	2 – 4	FC Fief Geste
30 August	15:00	Saint Charles Gardes	2 – 3 a.e.t	Cholet Portugais FC
30 August	15:00	FC Villedieu-La Renaudiere	3 – 2 a.e.t	Toutlemonde Concelles
30 August	15:00	Olympique Lire Drain	1 – 0	AS Mauges
30 August	15:00	Mazieres-en-Mauges	2 – 1	US loire Divatte
30 August	15:00	CM Saint Laurent Mottay	1 – 3	Mauves Saint-Denis
30 August	15:00	Saint Quentin Chadron	0 – 3	ASV MonniEres Pallet
30 August	15:00	Salle Aubry Poitevin	1 – 3	Sevre-et-Maine FC
30 August	15:00	Val-de-Moine FC	5 – 2	AS Vertou Beautour
30 August	15:00	Saint Andre 13 Voies	2 – 3	La Romagne Roussay
30 August	15:00	US Les Lucs-sur-Boulogne	2 – 2; 4 - 2 pen.	US Les SoriniEres Elan
30 August	15:00	FC Saint Sulpice Morm.	1 – 2 a.e.t	Geneston Sud Loire
30 August	15:00	US Bernardiere Cugan	1 – 2	Etoile Clisson
30 August	15:00	Laurentais Landem	3 – 1 a.e.t	AS Sautron
30 August	15:00	US Chaussaire	1 – 0	US Sainte Luce
30 August	15:00	AS Cellier	0 – 0; 21 - 20 pen.	FC Coueron Chabossiere
30 August	15:00	US Pellerin	3 – 0	JA Saint Mars du Desert
30 August	15:00	AS Grandchamp	2 – 4 a.e.t	ASPTT Nantes
30 August	15:00	US Bouguenais	0 – 3	AC Chapelain la Chappelle
30 August	15:00	US Orvault Bugalliere	2 – 1	JGE Suce
30 August	15:00	AEPR RezE	0 – 2	RC Orvault
30 August	15:00	AF Heulin la Chappelle	1 – 5	UF Saint-Herblain
30 August	15:00	FC Stade CouEron	1 – 2 a.e.t	Nantes Mellinet Football
30 August	15:00	ES Longevillaise	4 – 0	AS Landevieille
30 August	15:00	US Champ Saint Pere	2 – 1	US Landeronde Saint Georges
30 August	15:00	SC Appremont	0 – 2	ASMA Moutiers
30 August	15:00	AS Saint Maixent	1 – 6	US Grues
30 August	15:00	AB Beignon Basset	3 – 2	AS Saint Michel-en-Herm
30 August	15:00	Soullans Hirondelles	1 – 5	FC Talmondais
30 August	15:00	Sporting Commequiers	3 – 1	Bois.Ldes.N*e
30 August	15:00	PA Saint Paul En	1 – 2	US Vouvant Bourneau
30 August	15:00	Entente Fraternelle Chappelle	–	Foot Espoir 85
30 August	15:00	Boulogne-Merla	1 – 0	Saint Vincent-Gr
30 August	15:00	FC Noirmoutier	3 – 1	Hermitage de Venansault
30 August	15:00	USM Beauvoir	0 – 3	Chat. Olonne
30 August	15:00	AS La Reorthe Saint Philip	2 – 5	La Roche Generaudier
30 August	15:00	Autize Saint Hilaire	3 – 2	Mareuil SC
30 August	15:00	ES Bournezeau	1 – 6	Benet Damvix Maille
30 August	15:00	US Saint Hermine	0 – 6	Cheff. Saint Maur
30 August	15:00	JF Saint Prouant	3 – 2	FC Nieul Oulmes Bo
30 August	15:00	US Meilleraie Tillay	1 – 3 a.e.t	ES Ile-de-Elle
30 August	15:00	Saint Michel S. Herbergement	1 – 3	US Chateau-Thebaud
30 August	15:00	VDS Verrie Saint-Aubin	0 – 2 a.e.t	Le May-sur-Evre
30 August	15:00	Saint Martin-Tille	1 – 2	AF Trementines
30 August	15:00	ES Gaubretiere	0 – 0; 7 - 8 pen.	JA Maulevrier
30 August	15:00	Les Epesses Saint Mars	1 – 3	Saint Macaire la Fraternelle
30 August	15:00	Etoile Mouzillon	3 – 3; 4 - 2 pen.	US Boissiere Remaudiere
30 August	15:00	Sporting Guyonniere	1 – 1; 8 - 7 pen.	ES Vallet
30 August	15:00	EV Saint Philbert de B.	3 – 4	ES Haute-Goulaine
30 August	15:00	AML Couets Boug	1 – 5	CLB Rocheserviere
30 August	15:00	CS La Planche	0 – 2	FC Saligny
30 August	15:00	Boussay Saint Sebastien	3 – 2	Saint Georges Mont.
30 August	15:00	US Getigne	0 – 3	FCG Essarts
30 August	15:00	Gorges Elan	1 – 0	ES Saint Denis Chevasse
30 August	15:00	SS Antigny Saint-Maurice	0 – 6	ES Pineaux Saint Ouen
30 August	15:00	Thouarsais Caillere	0 – 1	Jeanne d'Arc de Nesm
30 August	15:00	US Aubigny	1 – 2	Olympique Coex
30 August	15:00	FCJA Jard-sur-Mer	1 – 0	Chaize-le-Vic
30 August	15:00	Saint Aubin la Plaine R	3 – 2	Stade Olonne-sur-Mer
30 August	15:00	US Ferrier	3 – 1	Nieul Dolent
30 August	15:00	Hermenault Serigne	3 – 0	La Roche Jean Yole
30 August	15:00	Saint Cyr Gats E	2 – 4	Saint Fulgent la Vigil.
30 August	15:00	Saint Martin Noyers E.	1 – 3	FC Saint Julien Vaire
30 August	15:00	EV le Fenouiller	0 – 1	ASR Machecoul
30 August	15:00	US Saint-Étienne Pall.	1 – 0	FC Legé
30 August	15:00	FC Garnache	3 – 4 a.e.t	Pornic Foot
30 August	15:00	RS Boupere	1 – 5	Somloire Cerqueux
30 August	15:00	Saint Andre Goul	1 – 2 a.e.t	Athletic le Puy Saint Bonnet
30 August	15:00	US Vay	1 – 3	Esperance Crossac
30 August	15:00	ES Puy Vaudelnay	1 – 3	ASI Murs Erigne
30 August	15:00	Stade le Croisic	2 – 1	US Sainte Reine
30 August	15:00	Camoel Sud Vilaine	0 – 2	FC Donges
30 August	15:00	Campbon Esperance	1 – 2 a.e.t	Guerance Saint Aubin
30 August	15:00	Vernoil Vernantes	2 – 3	ES Layon
30 August	15:00	Guerande Madeleine	0 – 3	CS Montoirin
30 August	15:00	FC Louet Juigneen	0 – 1	AC Longue
30 August	15:00	FC Estuaire	1 – 2 a.e.t	Saint Marc-sur-Mer Foot
30 August	15:00	Saint-Joachim Breire S	2 – 1	ES Pornichet
30 August	15:00	FC Layon	0 – 2	SC Angers Doutre
30 August	15:00	US Savenay	0 – 2	OS Saint Nazaire
30 August	15:00	AF Etriche	–	CAS la Possonniere
30 August	15:00	Cordem Temple	1 – 3	UMP Saint Nazaire
30 August	15:00	US Cantenay Epinard	0 – 0; 3 - 5 pen.	US Maze
30 August	15:00	Guemene Pays	1 – 3	Saint-Dolay Amicale
30 August	15:00	FC Anjou Baconne	0 – 3	NDC Angers
30 August	15:00	NTS Toutes-Aides	2 – 3	FC Petit Mars
30 August	15:00	AS Valanjou	0 – 2	Les Rosiers Gennes
30 August	15:00	US Briollay	4 – 1	AS Seiches Marce
30 August	15:00	OC Saint-Herblain	3 – 4	Saint Paul de Retz
30 August	15:00	E. du Don Moisdon Meilleraye	2 – 5	GL Becon Louroux
30 August	15:00	AS Ecouflant	3 – 5 a.e.t	ES La Poueze
30 August	15:00	ES Dresny Plesse	2 – 1	Nantes Saint Pierre
30 August	15:00	CA Chalonnes	3 – 3; 4 - 3 pen.	Andard Brain
30 August	15:00	Saint Sebastien Prof.	3 – 4 a.e.t	NTES Saint Med. Doulon
30 August	15:00	CA le Lion Angers	0 – 3	Corze Pellouilles
30 August	15:00	AS Saffre	1 – 2 a.e.t	NTS Metallo Sports
30 August	15:00	Sainte Gemmes	1 – 3	Saint Martin Avire Louv
30 August	15:00	SC Derval Nord Atlan	3 – 3; 3 - 4 pen.	JSC Bellevue Nantes
30 August	15:00	NTS Etoile de Cens	1 – 3	Brennois Boiseen
30 August	15:00	Chevrol.Herb.	1 – 0	AC Saint Brevin
30 August	15:00	Saint Georges-sur-Loire	0 – 5	Angers Vaillante Sports
30 August	15:00	NTS Saint Felix	3 – 0	US Abbaretz
30 August	15:00	FC Becon Saint Augustin	0 – 4	OS Saint Melaine
30 August	15:00	Jans Saint-Michel	0 – 2	US Oudon
30 August	15:00	AS Saint Sylvain Anjou	1 – 4	Sainte Gemmes Andigne
30 August	15:00	US Pont Saint-Martin	3 – 1	SF Treillieres
30 August	15:00	JA Melay	0 – 6	Montreuil Juig.Bene
30 August	15:00	Basse Indre	2 – 1	FC Arche
30 August	15:00	SS La Membrolle	1 – 1; 4 - 2 pen.	ASC Saint Barthelemy
30 August	15:00	JS Saint Aubin Layon	0 – 3	ES Brissac Aubance
30 August	15:00	Amical Saint Lyphard	2 – 4	SS Bouvron
30 August	15:00	FC Villeveque Souc	1 – 0	ES Montilliers
30 August	15:00	FC Mesquer	0 – 6	FC Saint-Nazareth Immaculee
30 August	15:00	ASPTT Angers	3 – 0	AS Jumelles
30 August	15:00	FC Oceane	1 – 3	JA Besne
30 August	15:00	Angers Monpl. Aisir	2 – 2; 3 - 1 pen.	Bauge Echemire
30 August	15:00	Chauve Eclair	3 – 3; 5 - 4 pen.	Saint Nazareth A. Mean
30 August	15:00	AC Angers B. Beille	1 – 2	ASVR Ambillou
30 August	15:00	US Saint-Viaud	0 – 3	ES Maritime
30 August	15:00	ESSPG Cholet Nuaille	0 – 3	SM Treize Septiers
30 August	15:00	FC Saint-Étienne Mtluc	2 – 2; 3 - 0 pen.	AS Saint Leger
30 August	15:00	Challain Loir	2 – 5	AS Sion les Mines
30 August	15:00	US Isse	2 – 1	SO Cande Freigne
30 August	15:00	FC Chatelais	3 – 1	CO Saint Mars Jaille
30 August	15:00	CP Asserac	4 – 2	OS Trignac
30 August	15:00	Bourg de Ire Tremblay	1 – 1; 6 - 7 pen.	Saint Aubin Chat
30 August	15:00	Saint Florient le Vieil	3 – 2	AA Saint-Hilaire Clis.
30 August	15:00	Herbig. Saint Cyr	4 – 2	OS Batz Korrigans
30 August	15:00	Bouzille Marillais	4 – 4; 4 - 3 pen.	AS Maine
30 August	15:00	Avessac Saint Paul	1 – 2 a.e.t	AOS Pontcheateau
30 August	15:00	FC La Varenne	0 – 5	FC Heric
30 August	15:00	ES Varennes Villeber	5 – 0	USC Corne
30 August	15:00	AFC Bouin-bois-Cene	3 – 0	SS Ile-de-Yeu
30 August	15:00	OS Saint Gilles X Vie	0 – 4	Saint Philbert Gd L
30 August	15:00	Bretignolle Marsouin	1 – 1; 4 - 3 pen.	Mouillier. Capt
30 August	15:00	AS Saint Hilaire Riez	0 – 1 a.e.t	SA Saint Florent des B.
30 August	15:00	Saint Malo Saint Laurent Foot	1 – 0	Olympique Chemille
30 August	15:00	La Fraternelle Mortagne	2 – 5	Andreze Jub-Jallais
30 August	15:00	ES Seguiniere	1 – 0	La Patriote de Chantonnay
30 August	15:00	Saint Christophe Bois	2 – 1	US Sainte Cecile
30 August	15:00	Saint Leger-Begrolles	0 – 1	Chavagnes Rabatel
30 August	15:00	ASPTT Cholet Caeb	3 – 1	US Bazoges-Beaurpaire
30 August	15:00	US Chauche	1 – 3	Etoile Saint Andre Marche
30 August	15:00	AS Bruffiere Defont.	2 – 1	AS Longeron Torfou
30 August	15:00	ES Saint Hilaire Loulay	1 – 5	ASE Montbert
30 August	15:00	ES Copechagniere	0 – 2	AC Basse Goulaine
30 August	15:00	US Le Oie	0 – 2	ES Yzernay
30 August	15:00	FC Mouchamps Rochetr	1 – 2	ES La Toussoualle
30 August	15:00	AS Saint Christophe L.	1 – 7	ES Pays de Monts
30 August	15:00	Entente Saint Paul Mache	0 – 3	FC Retz
30 August	15:00	EM Sallertaine	1 – 2	FC Logne Boulogne
30 August	15:00	Faller-Froidf	1 – 2 a.e.t	FC Bouaye
30 August	15:00	Sigournais Germinois	1 – 2	ES Brosbreuil
30 August	15:00	Belleville-sur-Vie	2 – 0	Dompierre-sur-Von
30 August	15:00	Saumur Portugais	2 – 1	RC Doue la Fontaine
30 August	15:00	Saint Hilaire Vihiers	0 – 4	AS Saumur Bayard
30 August	15:00	AS Maumusson	0 – 3	Nyoiseau Bouille
30 August	15:00	FC Pin Vritz	0 – 3	AS Avrille
30 August	15:00	Jaudonniere Aiglons	2 – 3 a.e.t	Chaille Marai
30 August	15:00	FC Pierretardiere	2 – 0	Vix FC
30 August	15:00	CBOS Angers	6 – 0	ASC La Rouxiere
30 August	15:00	Les Landes Genusson	2 – 2; 3 - 1 pen.	SLS Coron

=== Auvergne ===
Auvergne
Date	Kick off	Home	Result	Away
28 August	20:30	ES Cele Garenne	1 – 3	CS Arpajon
29 August	18:00	AS Embl. Vorey	1 – 1; 2 - 3 pen.	Bas-en-Basset
29 August	18:00	Carladez Goul Sports	0 – 2 a.e.t	Entente Saint Paul-Lac
29 August	20:00	AS Chassenard Luneau	2 – 0	CS Bessay
29 August	20:00	Chaudesaigues	1 – 1; 5 - 4 pen.	Vic Polmin Cere
29 August	20:00	AS Chadrac	1 – 1; 7 - 8 pen.	Vergongheon
29 August	20:00	Brives Sauv	2 – 1	Langogne
29 August	20:00	Pionsat Saint Hilaire	1 – 3	Saint Gervais Auvergne
29 August	20:00	Saint Germain Lembron	1 – 3	ALS Besse
30 August	20:00	ES Ch. Bressolles	5 – 3 a.e.t	ASPTT Vichy
30 August	20:00	Beaulon Bal.	2 – 0	Bourbon Sports
30 August	20:00	US Chevagnes	0 – 3	AS Trevol
30 August	20:00	US Jeunes de Mayotte	4 – 1	Le Donjon Lenax
30 August	20:00	CS Thiel-Acolin	5 – 1	Garnat Saint Martin
30 August	20:00	US Doyet	0 – 2	AS Cerilly
30 August	20:00	AS Premilhat	3 – 1	AL Quinssaines
30 August	20:00	AS Villebretoise	6 – 0	FC Montlucon
30 August	20:00	Charmes 2000	3 – 7	Montlucon Ilets
30 August	20:00	Montlucon Chatel	1 – 3	UST Huriel
30 August	20:00	Bezenet FC	1 – 7	CS Cosne
30 August	20:00	CS Villefranche	0 – 2	AS Neris
30 August	20:00	US Saint Victor	4 – 0	AS Montlucon
30 August	20:00	US Desertines	3 – 4	Lignerolles Lavault
30 August	20:00	FC Mayotte Bellerive	3 – 1	AS Tronget
30 August	20:00	AS Billezois	1 – 4	Le V. Creuzier
30 August	20:00	AS Rongeres	1 – 5	Saint Germain Fosses
30 August	15:00	US Ebreuil	0 – 2	US Abrest'
30 August	15:00	US Carbonat	0 – 10	AS Sensac
30 August	16:00	CS Paray-Loriges	0 – 5	SC Gannat
30 August	16:00	Chapelle Molles	3 – 5	AS Ferrieres
30 August	16:00	Martres D'Artiere	1 – 4	Stade Saint Yorre
30 August	16:00	ES Diou	0 – 5	Entente Moulins Yzeure
30 August	16:00	Lurcy Levis	0 – 6	SC Avermes
30 August	16:00	ASPTT Moulins	3 – 6	Souvigny FC
30 August	16:00	SC Ygrande	1 – 4	AS Gennetines
30 August	16:00	AS Seuillet	2 – 4	US Vendat
30 August	16:00	COA Commentary	1 – 3	AS Montmarault
30 August	16:00	US Meaulne	1 – 2	Athletic Montlucon Bien
30 August	16:00	AS Saint Loup	4 – 2	AS Bouce
30 August	16:00	Bellerive Brugheas	4 – 2	ES Le Vernet
30 August	16:00	AS Mercy-Chapeau	2 – 1	ES Molinet
30 August	16:00	US Saint Gerand Le Puy	1 – 2	Billy-Crechy
30 August	16:00	US Aspre Maronne	0 – 4	Ytrac F.
30 August	16:00	BR Albepierre	1 – 3	AS Saint Just
30 August	16:00	AS Saint-Poncy	0 – 8	ES Pierrefort
30 August	16:00	E. Angl-Salers	1 – 8	AS Espinat
30 August	16:00	Moussages FC	3 – 0	Reilhac FC
30 August	16:00	Vitrac Marcoles	0 – 3	US Jussac
30 August	16:00	Minier FC	2 – 1	Chalinargues
30 August	16:00	AS Belbex	1 – 2	Haute Chataigne
30 August	16:00	AS Talizat	1 – 0	AS Vebret
30 August	16:00	US Crandelles	3 – 2	Doire Bertrande
30 August	16:00	CS Vezac	3 – 1	Entente Lafeuillade
30 August	16:00	AS Cezens	0 – 2	Junhac-Montsalvy
30 August	16:00	AS Villedieu	1 – 0	Stade Riomois
30 August	16:00	La Lachapelle	1 – 3	US Murat
30 August	16:00	Jordanne FC	2 – 5	Entente Chataigneraie
30 August	16:00	US Carlat	3 – 3; 4 - 2 pen.	ES Saint Marnet
30 August	16:00	AS Laussonne	0 – 6	Saint Julien Chapteuil
30 August	16:00	Espaly FC	3 – 1	Paulhaguet FC
30 August	16:00	La Bastide Puy Laur	1 – 1; 5 - 4 pen.	Arsac
30 August	16:00	Le Puy Portugais	6 – 2	Saint Paulien Blanzac
30 August	16:00	Vezezoux	3 – 1	ASC Langeac
30 August	16:00	Retournac	2 – 3	CO Craponne
30 August	16:00	Lapte	3 – 4	ES Saint Maurice
30 August	16:00	Olby-Mazayes	1 – 0	Saint Genes Champanelle
30 August	16:00	Pontgibaud-Goutelle	0 – 3	Rochefort Laqueuille
30 August	16:00	NOA Paslieres	1 – 2	Lezoux FC
30 August	16:00	AS Joze	1 – 5	Chappes FF
30 August	16:00	CS Vertolaye	0 – 2	Saint Amant-Tallende
30 August	16:00	US Menat	2 – 2; 5 - 3 pen.	US Ennezat
30 August	16:00	Plauzat-Champeix	2 – 1	CO Veyre Monton
30 August	16:00	Charb. Les Vieilles	1 – 3	AS Enval
30 August	16:00	Racing France Clermont	1 – 3	SC Nebouzat
30 August	16:00	Celles-sur-Durolle	2 – 2; 3 - 2 pen.	US Maringues
30 August	16:00	AS de la Gauthiere	0 – 6	Lempdes Sports
30 August	16:00	Aubiere FC	1 – 3	Perignat-Sarlieve
30 August	16:00	Clermont Ouvoimoja	9 – 1	FC Blanzat
30 August	16:00	FC Sayat-Argnat	1 – 6	AS Romagnat
30 August	16:00	Charb-Paugnat	0 – 0; 5 - 3 pen.	US Vic-le-Comte
30 August	16:00	FC Mezel	2 – 3	La Monnerie
30 August	16:00	SC Billom	8 – 1	Beauregard L'Eveque
30 August	16:00	Brassac Les Mines	1 – 2	CS Pont-du-Chateau
30 August	16:00	CS Pont-de-Dore	2 – 1	AS Chabreloche
30 August	16:00	US Courpiere	2 – 2; 3 - 4 pen.	US Orcet
30 August	16:00	US Messeix	3 – 2	Clermont Portugal
30 August	16:00	Aigueperse FC	2 – 3	Nord Combraille
30 August	16:00	AI Saint Babel	0 – 1	Combelle Charb.
30 August	16:00	US Marsat	2 – 1	Saint Priest-Champs
30 August	16:00	Saint Bonnet Pres Riom	0 – 2	FC Chatel Guyon
30 August	16:00	AS Orcines	6 – 1	Saint Ours Les Roches
30 August	16:00	'SP Aulnat	2 – 1	US Chapdes-Beaufort
30 August	16:00	US Isserteaux	1 – 2	US Saint Beauzire
30 August	16:00	Vertaizon FC	1 – 2	Haute Dordogne
30 August	16:00	Clermont Fontaine Du	3 – 1	US Gerzat

=== Basse Normandie ===
Basse-Normandie
Date	Kick off	Home	Result	Away
22 August	16:00	CO Ceauce	4 – 3 a.e.t	ESM Condeen
22 August	16:00	Sporting Saint Georges	2 – 0	AS La Selle La Forge
22 August	16:00	Tessy Moyon Sports	2 – 0	ES Marigny
23 August	15:00	FC Val De Saire	0 – 1	AS Querquevillaise
23 August	15:00	FC Digosville	1 – 0	FC Ouest Cotentin
23 August	15:00	AS Martinvast	0 – 3	AS Tourlaville
23 August	15:00	HS Octeville	0 – 2	AS Pointe Cotentin
23 August	15:00	ASS Urville Nacquevill	3 – 0	US La Glacerie
23 August	15:00	Octeville PL	2 – 1	US Cote Des Iles
23 August	15:00	ES Pirou	0 – 2	AS Plain Cotentin
23 August	15:00	SM Haytillon	0 – 6	CS Carentanais
23 August	15:00	AS Saint Marie Mont	0 – 2	AJ Saint-Pryve Saint-Hilaire
23 August	15:00	US Vesly Laulne	1 – 3	ES Des Marais
23 August	15:00	ES Gouville	0 – 3	RS Saint Sauverais
23 August	15:00	ES Munevillaise	3 – 11	Creances Sports
23 August	15:00	ES Picauville	1 – 4	FC Agon Coutainville
23 August	15:00	US Lessay	1 – 2 a.e.t	Periers Sports
23 August	15:00	US Percy	0 – 6	CS Villedieu
23 August	15:00	FC Le Val Saint Pere	1 – 2	US Saint Pairaise
23 August	15:00	P. Saint Jamaise	0 – 0; 3 - 4 pen.	Saint Hilaire Virey Lan
23 August	15:00	ES Tirepied	2 – 3	La Brehalaise
23 August	15:00	AS Vessey	0 – 4	US Saint Quentin-Homme
23 August	15:00	AS Montaigu Bloutier	0 – 3	ES Trelly Quettre
23 August	15:00	US Saint Martin Champs	2 – 1	AS Folligny
23 August	15:00	AS Sacey Tanis	3 – 1	US Gavray
23 August	15:00	US Ducey	2 – 0	AS Brecey
23 August	15:00	ES Isigny Le Buat	1 – 5	Esperance Saint Jean Haize
23 August	15:00	ES Terregatte	0 – 3	AS Jullouville Sarti
23 August	15:00	AS Cerences Contrier	0 – 0; 2 - 3 pen.	ES Marcey Les Greves
23 August	15:00	FC De L Elle	0 – 2	US Trevieres
23 August	15:00	CA Pontois	5 – 4	FC Vire Joigne
23 August	15:00	Esperance Lorey Haut.Feug.	1 – 0	US Saint-Croix Saint-Lo
23 August	15:00	Agneaux FC	3 – 1	USI Bessin Nord
23 August	15:00	US Mortainaise	2 – 0	US La Sauvagere
23 August	15:00	ESB Saint Cornier Lande	0 – 12	AS Passais St Fraim
23 August	15:00	AM La Ferriere	2 – 3	JS De Tinchebray
23 August	15:00	FC Carrouges	1 – 4	USCO Sourdeval
23 August	15:00	US Champsecret	0 – 6	ASC Petruvienne
23 August	15:00	US Andaine	0 – 5	SL Vaudry
23 August	15:00	US Athis	0 – 2	Athletic de Messei
23 August	15:00	OC Briouze	2 – 4	FC Landais
23 August	15:00	SAM Football	1 – 2	Ved. De Boisthorel
23 August	15:00	AS Merlerault Nonant	3 – 2	Athletic Etoile Du Perche
23 August	15:00	Athletic Saint-Germain Corbeis	1 – 7	ES Forges Radon
23 August	15:00	Olympique Alençon	3 – 2	AS Berd Huis
23 August	15:00	US Mortagnaise	1 – 0	Sees FC
23 August	15:00	AS De Villeneuve	3 – 1	FC Remalard Moutiers
23 August	15:00	ES Noce	1 – 6	AS Courteille Alençon
23 August	15:00	FC Pays Bellemois	1 – 2	FC Du Pays Aiglon
23 August	15:00	US Moussonvilliers	0 – 6	CS Pays Longny
23 August	15:00	US Theilloise	1 – 3	US Meloise
23 August	15:00	FC Ecouche	2 – 1	AS Gaceenne
23 August	15:00	AS Bouce	2 – 4	AS La Hoguette
23 August	15:00	ES Du Tronquay	3 – 0	RS Saint Sauverais
23 August	15:00	ES Munevillaise	1 – 2	ES Portaise
23 August	15:00	AS Saint Vigor Le Grand	1 – 2	US Villers Bocage
23 August	15:00	US Maisons	3 – 6	FC Des Etangs
23 August	15:00	AS Cahagnaise	1 – 2 a.e.t	Lystrienne Sportive
23 August	15:00	US Aunay-sur-Odon	4 – 1	FC Croix Carol
23 August	15:00	AS Suisse Nord	0 – 1	JB Fertoise
23 August	15:00	AS Potigny	1 – 1; 4 -3 pen.	US Viettoise
23 August	15:00	ES Courtonnaise	3 – 7	FC Vimoutiers
23 August	15:00	AS Saint-Cyr Fervaques	0 – 1	ES Livarotaise
23 August	15:00	USC Mezidon	0 – 7	ESFC Falaise
23 August	15:00	AS Morteaux	1 – 0	AS Saint-Germain Langot
23 August	15:00	ES Escoville Herouvi	0 – 2	Olympique Lion-sur-Mer
23 August	15:00	AS Cabourgeoise	0 – 5	FC Bretteville-Laize
23 August	15:00	ES Cormelles	1 – 4	FC Argences
23 August	15:00	AS Home Varaville	0 – 3	AS Villers BB
23 August	15:00	ES Amfrevillaise	0 – 2	AFC Mouen
23 August	15:00	FC Luc-Mer	0 – 1	ASC Lexoviens
23 August	15:00	US Bellengreville	1 – 0	ES De Troarn
23 August	15:00	Stade Saint Sauverais	1 – 2	ES Moult
23 August	15:00	AS Saint-Desir	1 – 3	ES Estuaire Touques
23 August	15:00	AS Demouville Football	0 – 2	AG Caennaise
23 August	15:00	ES Bonnebosq	5 – 2	Fc Orne-Et-Oden
23 August	15:00	US Lexovienne	1 – 7	US Thaon
23 August	15:00	ES Carpiquet	3 – 0	AS Verson
23 August	15:00	ASL Chemin Vert	2 – 6	AM Turque Herouville
23 August	15:00	ES Val De L Orne	1 – 4	ESI May-sur-Orne
23 August	15:00	US Authie	2 – 2; 4 - 2pen.	US Bretteville
23 August	15:00	ASL Ajon	1 – 5	US Creully
23 August	15:00	FC Saint Sylvain	0 – 5	AS De Rots
23 August	15:00	ES Airan Mery Corbon	1 – 0	US Cheux St Manvieu
23 August	15:00	JS Fleury-sur-Orne	1 – 3	US Pont L Eveque
23 August	15:00	ES Thury Harcourt	3 – 2	JS Douvres
23 August	15:00	AS Soliers	3 – 2	JS Colleville
23 August	15:00	ES Hermanville	0 – 0; 2 - 4 pen.	LC Bretteville
23 August	15:00	Bourguebus Sports	3 – 0	CS Honfleur
23 August	15:00	Cambes En Plaine Sports	1 – 6	AS De Vieux
23 August	15:00	US Houlgate	3 – 4 a.e.t	Fontaine Etoupef. FC
23 August	15:00	Sud Ouest Caen FC	1 – 5	NGS Ver-sur-Mer
26 August	18:00	AS Brix	0 – 2	Equeurdr. Hainnev FC
26 August	18:00	US Bricquebec	–	AS Valognes
26 August	18:00	L. Saint Georges	0 – 3	JS Flerienne
26 August	18:00	US Petruvienne	–	CS Orbec

=== Bretagne ===
Bretagne
Date	Kick off	Home	Result	Away
23 August	15:00	AS Plounerin	0 – 11	Sporting Plehedel
23 August	15:00	KC Tonquedec	4 – 2 a.e.t	RC Ploumagoar
23 August	15:00	AS Caouennec Lanveze	0 – 6	AS Plestin
23 August	15:00	SCB Guingamp	1 – 5	ES Pontrieux Trieux
23 August	15:00	US Treglamus	0 – 2	ES Pommerit Le Mans
23 August	15:00	MBS Pedernec	1 – 3	UST Lezardrieux
23 August	15:00	US Goelands de Plouezec	2 – 1	US Louargat
23 August	15:00	Lizildry Plougres FC	2 – 11	US Ploumiliau
23 August	15:00	US Goudelin	4 – 3	US Plouisy
23 August	15:00	AS Pabu	0 – 2	JS Cavan
23 August	15:00	AS Tregorroise	1 – 0	FC Trelevern Trevo
23 August	15:00	Jeanne d'Arc Penvena	3 – 2 a.e.t	ES Coatreven Rudonou
23 August	15:00	US de Pays Rochois	2 – 1 a.e.t	JS Langoat
23 August	15:00	US Plouagat Lanrod	0 – 4	US Prat
23 August	15:00	GOUA Laniscat	3 – 4	US Callac
23 August	15:00	Olympique de Trieux Plesidy	1 – 0	AS la Montagne
23 August	15:00	La Croix Corlay FC	3 – 2	US Plouguiste
23 August	15:00	FC du Vieux Bourg	2 – 0	US Plounevez Lanrivain
23 August	15:00	AVS Plenaltais Plaine	0 – 3	AS Kerien Magoar
23 August	15:00	ES Le Foeil	1 – 3	US Argoat
23 August	15:00	CS Croix Lamber	0 – 4	AS Saint-Herve
23 August	15:00	AMS Pordicaise	1 – 2	AS Tregueux
23 August	15:00	AFC Tregueux	2 – 1	AS Tremuson
23 August	15:00	F. Ouest de Saint Brieu	0 – 3	ASL Saint Julien
23 August	15:00	US Saint Donan	0 – 3	AML Saint Carreuc
23 August	15:00	AS Moncontour	2 – 0	JS Allineuc
23 August	15:00	AS Trebry	0 – 3	AS la Motterieux
23 August	15:00	Saint Murois Bretagne	0 – 0; 5 - 4 pen.	JS Plouguenast
23 August	15:00	US Saint Caradec	1 – 4	FC Saint-Bugan Loudea
23 August	15:00	AS Gomene	2 – 1	AS Grace Uzel
23 August	15:00	AML Plemy	3 – 0	AS Saint Barnabe
23 August	15:00	CS Illifaut	1 – 4	JS Sevignac Rouill
23 August	15:00	US Hennonnaise	2 – 1	US Brehand
23 August	15:00	En Avant de Plenee	1 – 0	ES Tredaniel
23 August	15:00	Olympique Maroue	2 – 4	AS Coetmieux Foot
23 August	15:00	US Planguenoual	1 – 3	JS Landehen Maroue
23 August	15:00	ES Penguilly	1 – 0	FC Plestan-Saint Rieu
23 August	15:00	AS Plumaudan	0 – 4	AS Broons Tremeur
23 August	15:00	AS Crehen	4 – 2	US Lanvallay Foot
23 August	15:00	US Pledeliac	1 – 0	FC Flora Saint Alban
23 August	15:00	HDB Henansal	1 – 3	ES Saint Cast Le Gui
23 August	15:00	La Penthievre la Poterie FC	1 – 2	CS Plelanais
23 August	15:00	AS Gutte-Gue	2 – 3	FC Trevron
23 August	15:00	US Brusvily	1 – 3 a.e.t	Saint-Evrannais
23 August	15:00	AS Saint Potan	2 – 0	Vicomtois FC
23 August	15:00	JS Andel	1 – 3	US Erquy
23 August	15:00	ES Saint Philbert	1 – 3 a.e.t	ES Crachoise
23 August	15:00	Les Volontaires de Augan	1 – 5	Broceliande Campeneac Foot
23 August	15:00	La Fondelienne de Carentoir	1 – 1; 5 – 6 pen.	US La Chapelle Gac
23 August	15:00	Erdeven Etel Foot	4 – 0	AGG Locmariaquer
23 August	15:00	Guehenno Cadets	0 – 13	Plumelec Meli
23 August	15:00	L. Hermine Guernatte	0 – 4	SC Sournais
23 August	15:00	Saint Landevantais FC	0 – 4	ES Merlevenez
23 August	15:00	FC Lanester	2 – 3	Folclo Loriest
23 August	15:00	ESS Le Croisty	1 – 2 a.e.t	US Berne
23 August	15:00	AS Berne Ile	1 – 3	Esperance Saint Jacut
23 August	15:00	La Locminoise	1 – 3	ACAS Moustoir
23 August	15:00	Hermine de Meneac	0 – 3	Entente Mohon Saint Malo 3
23 August	15:00	ES Neulliac	0 – 3	Foyer Laiq. Cleguerec
23 August	15:00	Kernas Lignol	0 – 1	Foyer Laiq. Inguiniel
23 August	15:00	AS Plouharnel	0 – 1	ES Ploemeloise
23 August	15:00	AS Locquenin Plouh	3 – 6	Esperance Saint Helene
23 August	15:00	Saint Guyomard FC	–	La Serentaise
23 August	15:00	Asc. Baden	0 – 3	AS Le Bono
23 August	15:00	FC Saint Helene	2 – 5	JA Plouhinec
23 August	15:00	Stiren Kliguer de Cleguer	5 – 0	US Plouay
23 August	15:00	AS Calanaise	0 – 1	Av. Plouaysien
23 August	15:00	AS du Guermeur	2 – 3 a.e.t	AS Gestel
23 August	15:00	La Saint Efflam Kervign	1 – 0	US Saint Gavrais
23 August	15:00	CS Larmorien	2 – 2; 5 - 4 pen.	L'Entente Saint Gilloise
23 August	15:00	US Hennebontaise	5 – 1	FC Kerchopine
23 August	15:00	AS Priziacoise	1 – 2	Av. Guiscriff
23 August	15:00	La Fleur de Ajonc Inzinzac	1 – 4	Garde De Voeu Hennebont
23 August	15:00	AS Bubry	0 – 1	US Saint Guemenois
23 August	15:00	Les Ajoncs d'Or	7 – 2	Garde Saint Eloi Kerfou
23 August	15:00	CS Saint Gerand	1 – 1; 3 - 2 pen.	Naizinois FC
23 August	15:00	US Rohannaise	0 – 4	La Saint Pierre Pleugri
23 August	15:00	Les Bleuets de Credi	1 – 3 a.e.t	La Saint Hubert Lanouee
23 August	15:00	La Saint Clair	2 – 1	Av. Buleon Lantillac
23 August	15:00	La Vigilante Radenac	1 – 0	Stade Garde Saint Arnould
23 August	15:00	Aurore de Taupont	2 – 0	Garde de Lyvel Loyat
23 August	15:00	Olympique Club de Beignon	2 – 1	Av. Saint Servant
23 August	15:00	CS Josselinais	2 – 1 a.e.t	USSAC Saint Abraham
23 August	15:00	La Garde de Mi-Voie-Guillac	0 – 2	Enfants de Saint Gildas
23 August	15:00	Saint Jean Ville	1 – 5	La Saint Herve de Caro
23 August	15:00	Les Glaneurs de Notre-Dame	0 – 3	AO Saint Nolff
23 August	15:00	Les Ecureuils le Roc	1 – 0	ES Larre Molac
23 August	15:00	La Saint Leon de Glenac	1 – 4	CS Saint-Guadence
23 August	15:00	La Saint Sebastien Cade	3 – 0	La Patriote Malansac
23 August	15:00	Larmoricaine de Peaule	0 – 2	La Gentienne Pluherl
23 August	15:00	La Jeune France Noya	2 – 1	La Vraie Croix Saint Elmer
23 August	15:00	Sarzeau FC	0 – 3	ES Plescop
23 August	15:00	US Saint Armel	2 – 2; 4 - 3 pen.	Semeurs Grandchamp
23 August	15:00	AS Trefflean	2 – 4	ES Meriadec
23 August	15:00	US Priziac le Cour	3 – 1	ES Colpo
23 August	15:00	Garde du Loch	2 – 4	AS Plougoumelen
23 August	15:00	Sporting Plumelin	0 – 4	US Brech
23 August	15:00	AS Kergonan	0 – 1	AS Pluvignoise
23 August	15:00	Sporting Landaul	3 – 5	ASC Sainte Anne
23 August	15:00	US Morlaix	2 – 2; 2 - 3 pen.	US Poullaouen
23 August	15:00	FC Berrien	0 – 5	La Guerlesquinaise
23 August	15:00	AS Scrignac	0 – 8	ES Saint Thegonnec
23 August	15:00	J. Unie Plougonven	2 – 2; 2 - 4 pen.	US Garlan
23 August	15:00	US Plouigneau	1 – 2	Entente Plougasnou
23 August	15:00	US Lanmeur Plouegat	2 – 7	FC Guiclan
23 August	15:00	Plouezoch FC	3 – 3; 5 - 4 pen.	US Taule
23 August	15:00	Gars de Plouenan	1 – 4	Entente Carantecoise
23 August	15:00	US Mespaul	0 – 4	FC Sainte Seve
23 August	15:00	Entente Filante Plougour	5 – 2	ES Lampaulaise
23 August	15:00	US Saint Servais	0 – 4	FC Bodilis-Plougar
23 August	15:00	La Saint Pierre de Plou	1 – 9	AS Sizun le Treho
23 August	15:00	ESE Plouedern	0 – 1	US Rochoise
23 August	15:00	ES Plouneventer	0 – 3	US Pencran
23 August	15:00	JS Saint Thonan	1 – 5	Saint Landerneen
23 August	15:00	AS Kersaint	2 – 4	Saint Divy Sports
23 August	15:00	ES Guissenyenne	1 – 2 a.e.t	Cot Legen Kerloua FC
23 August	15:00	Gas de Plouider	0 – 9	CND le Folgoet
23 August	15:00	AS Landeda	4 – 5	Hermine Kernilis
23 August	15:00	US Aber Treglonou	2 – 3	Le Drennec FC
23 August	15:00	ES Cranou le Faou	2 – 0	PL Lambezellec Brest
23 August	15:00	Stade le Relecq	5 – 2	PL Berg-Brest
23 August	15:00	AS Plougastel Daoulas	0 – 1	Saint Laur Brest
23 August	15:00	FC Brest-Bergot	1 – 4	FA Rade Logonna Daou
23 August	15:00	RC Loperhet	0 – 3	Joyeuse Grade Forest
23 August	15:00	A. Mahor Brest	0 – 5	ES de la Mignonn
23 August	15:00	ES Locmaria	1 – 1; 3 - 1 pen.	SC Brest
23 August	15:00	Saint Majan Plougu Gars	1 – 4	La Saint Pierre de Mili
23 August	15:00	AS Ploumoguer	0 – 3	AL Coataudon
23 August	15:00	US Saint Roch Plourin	0 – 1	Ent. Saint Arzel Plouarz
23 August	15:00	Lampaulais FC	0 – 2	SC Lanrivoare
23 August	15:00	AVEL Saint Pabu Vor	3 – 0	Ascaval Brest
23 August	15:00	FC du Prozay	0 – 5	AS Telgruc-sur-Mer
23 August	15:00	US Aulne Argol	3 – 6	AS Pont de Buis
23 August	15:00	Sporting Lanveoc	3 – 2	Les Gas du Menez Hom
23 August	15:00	Sporting Saint Nicolas	0 – 3	Douarnenez Treboul
23 August	15:00	ES Gouezecoise	0 – 3	AS Cast
23 August	15:00	AS Laz	0 – 5	US Chateauneuf
23 August	15:00	Sporting Saint Thois	0 – 7	Spezet Papillons Ble
23 August	15:00	JS Brasparts Loque	2 – 4	AS Cloitre Lannedern
23 August	15:00	JS Landeleausienne	1 – 3	US Cleden Poher
23 August	15:00	Les Toros Plouneveze	1 – 5	US Saint Hernin
23 August	15:00	US Kergloff	0 – 2	Sporting Edern
23 August	15:00	Les Ecureuils de Roudouallec	6 – 1	AS Motreff
23 August	15:00	JS Quemenevenoise	2 – 2; 3 - 4 pen.	US Lennonnaise
23 August	15:00	IS Landudal	2 – 3	Les Zebres de Tregou
23 August	15:00	AS Leuhan	0 – 1	ES Langolen
23 August	15:00	AS Trouch	0 – 5	AS Kernevel
23 August	15:00	US Saunt Thurien	3 – 6	US Querrien
23 August	15:00	Le Trevoux Coqs	0 – 1	FG Bannelec
23 August	15:00	Sporting Locunole	2 – 1 a.e.t	AS Tremevenoise
23 August	15:00	ES de Redene	0 – 2	Saint Mellacois
23 August	15:00	ES Riec-sur-Bellon	3 – 3; 5 - 4 pen.	AS Baye
23 August	15:00	FA Pont Aven	0 – 6	ES Nevez
23 August	15:00	La Foret Fouesnant	1 – 4	Hermine Concarnoise
23 August	15:00	FC Pleuvennois	0 – 3	S Saint Evarzec
23 August	15:00	FC Conbrit Saint Marine	0 – 4	Odet Benodet FC
23 August	15:00	Baguer Pican	6 – 3	ES Saint-Malo
23 August	15:00	JA Saint-Malo Saint-Servan	4 – 5 a.e.t	ES Plerguer
23 August	15:00	AS Saint Coulomb	0 – 1	US Pleurtuit
23 August	15:00	US Saint Guinoux	0 – 1	La Cancalaise Cancal
23 August	15:00	FC Bord Rance	1 – 0	Aubinois FC
23 August	15:00	FC Meillac	3 – 5 a.e.t	AS Epiniac Sports
23 August	15:00	Portes Bretagne	1 – 1; 4 - 2 pen.	US Pontorson
23 August	15:00	US Bille Javene	2 – 1	US Gosne
23 August	15:00	FC Landes	1 – 2 a.e.t	Saint Aubin Corm.
23 August	15:00	AS Erce Pres-Liffre	0 – 4	Sud Fougerais FC
23 August	15:00	US Baguer Morvan	2 – 4	Saint Malo Chat. Maloui
23 August	15:00	Marcille Bazouge	0 – 1	Saint Marc-Saint Ouen
23 August	15:00	Saint Sulp Foret	4 – 6 a.e.t	US Liffre
23 August	15:00	Montr. per Lan	1 – 1; 3 - 0 pen.	Saint George Chesney
23 August	15:00	JA Balaze	4 – 0	Esperance la Bouexiere
23 August	15:00	ASIA Moutiers	0 – 3	Les Bleuets le Pertre
23 August	15:00	JS Nouvoitou	1 – 4	CPB Ren Gayeu
23 August	15:00	US Domage-Saint Didier	1 – 3	REC Rennes
23 August	15:00	US Amanlis	0 – 1	SC Saint Senoux
23 August	15:00	FC Le Triangle	1 – 5	Martigne Cad
23 August	15:00	AS Sainte Anne	1 – 2	Jeanne d'Arc Pipriac
23 August	15:00	FC Guipry Messac	0 – 2	US Bain de Bretagne
23 August	15:00	US Guignen	0 – 2	Esperance Sixt-sur-Aff
23 August	15:00	Jeanne d'Arc Mordeil	0 – 4	US Pont Pean
23 August	15:00	US Laille	0 – 4	US Janze
23 August	15:00	CPB Cleunay Rennes	0 – 3	US Noyal Chatillon
23 August	15:00	FC Crevin	2 – 4 a.e.t	SC Goven
23 August	15:00	CPB Blosne Rennes	2 – 3	JS Baulon
23 August	15:00	FC Treffendel	1 – 3	US Gael-Muel
23 August	15:00	US Saint Meen	4 – 2 a.e.t	FC Montfort-sur-Meu
23 August	15:00	US La Chappelle-Cintr	0 – 2	AC Hermitage
23 August	15:00	JV Saint Onen	1 – 6	Monterfil Korrigans
23 August	15:00	Becherel Miniac	2 – 1	FC Talensac
23 August	15:00	ASS Portguais Rennes	0 – 3	FC Rennes Esperance
23 August	15:00	SEO Quedillac	3 – 5	US Iffendic
23 August	15:00	CPB Villejean Rennes	5 – 0	ASPTT Rennes
23 August	15:00	AV Irodouer	2 – 0	US Medreac
23 August	15:00	AS Vezin Coquet	2 – 4	AS Romille
23 August	15:00	AS Loctudy	0 – 1	US Ile Trudy
23 August	15:00	Sporting Peumerit Joyeeuse	0 – 11	Plomeur Gars
23 August	15:00	Bigouden FC	5 – 1	ES Saint Jean Trolim
23 August	15:00	La Raquette Tremeoc	2 – 0	FC Ploneour
23 August	15:00	AM Italia Bretagne	1 – 1; 6 - 5 pen.	Sporting Marcassins Treoga
23 August	15:00	Lapins de Guengat	2 – 5	US Portugais Quimper
23 August	15:00	Sporting Les Ecureuils Pl	0 – 2	Les Tricolores de la Lochrist
23 August	15:00	Sporting Pontecrucien	0 – 2	Goulien Sports
23 August	15:00	FC du Goyen	1 – 2	ES Beuzecoise
23 August	15:00	AS Poullan	1 – 2	ES Mahalon Confo
23 August	15:00	Kerlaz Sports	1 – 4	Sporting Gourzilon
23 August	15:00	FC Douarnenez	3 – 2	ES Ploneis
23 August	15:00	Sporting Pouldergat	1 – 3	ES Landudec-Guil
23 August	15:00	SM Torce	1 – 2	AVTGL Fougeres
23 August	15:00	Fougeres Mayo	2 – 3	Rennes Mahoraise
23 August	15:00	Saint Medard Coyotes	1 – 4	US Bedes
23 August	15:00	US Erbree Mondever	2 – 3	FC Louvigne Bazouge
23 August	15:00	Saint Guyomard Chevaliers	0 – 2	Saint Perreux FC
23 August	15:00	La Serentaise	0 – 3	Jeanne d'Arc Pleucad
23 August	15:00	US Bais	1 – 3	US Vern-sur-Seiche
23 August	15:00	ES Saint Pierre Plesguen	0 – 3	CJF Saint Malo
23 August	15:00	AS Montreuil le Gast	1 – 2	ES Thorigne Foui
23 August	15:00	AS Saint Erblon	7 – 1	Saint Louvigneen

=== Centre ===
Centre
Date	Kick off	Home	Result	Away
30 August	15:00	US Villedieu-sur-Indre	7 – 1	US Le Blanc
30 August	15:00	FC Diors	0 – 1	SC Châteauneuf-sur-Cher
30 August	15:00	US Neuvy Saint Sépulcre	0 – 2	US Aigurande
30 August	15:00	AS Saint Lactencin	3 – 1	US Châteaumeillant
30 August	15:00	US Le Poinçonnet	1 – 2	AC Parnac Val d'Abloux
30 August	15:00	SS Belabre	1 – 2 a.e.t	US Le Pêchereau
30 August	15:00	US Brenne Vendoeuvres	3 – 5 a.e.t	FUS Saint Benoît du Sault
30 August	15:00	AS Ingrandes	0 – 2	AS Arthon
30 August	15:00	US La Châtre	1 – 1; 7 - 8 pen.	FC Levroux
30 August	15:00	US Plaimpied Givaudins	0 – 3	SC Vatan
30 August	15:00	Domo Africa Châlette-sur-Loing	0 – 3	ES Justices Bourges
30 August	15:00	FC Saint Doulchard	2 – 0	AS Les Bordes
30 August	15:00	SA Issoudun	2 – 3	CA Montrichard
30 August	15:00	US Dampierre-en-Burly	5 – 0	AS Soings-en-Sologne
30 August	15:00	AS Contres	4 – 1	ASVL Pont de Ruan
30 August	15:00	SG Bléré	1 – 1; 4 - 2 pen.	FC Richelieu
30 August	15:00	ASC Chabris	2 – 4 a.e.t	US Lunery Rosières
30 August	15:00	CA St Laurent Nouan	2 – 0	AS La Chapelle Saint Ursin
30 August	15:00	US Saint Cyr-en-Val	6 – 2	US Les-aix-Rians
30 August	15:00	Olympique Mehun sur Yèvre	2 – 4	EB St Cyr sur Loire
30 August	15:00	ES Veretz Larçay	3 – 1	US Chambray les Tours
30 August	15:00	AS Chailles Cande 99	2 – 1	AS Chouzy Onzain
30 August	15:00	SL Chaillot Vierzon	5 – 3 a.e.t	O. Port. Mehun sur Yèvre
30 August	15:00	SC Massay	0 – 5	Racing La Riche Tours
30 August	15:00	ES Villebarou	4 – 2	AS St Germain du Puy
30 August	15:00	ACS Port. Blois	1 – 1; 5 - 4 pen.	US Chitenay Cellettes
30 August	15:00	US Saint Florent	1 – 3	AJS Mont-et-Bracieux
30 August	15:00	C. Deportivo Esp. Tours	3 – 2	FC Meung-sur-Loire
30 August	15:00	E. Chaingy St Ay	2 – 1	FC Saint Georges sur Eure
30 August	15:00	CS Angerville Pussay	2 – 3	Amicale Gallardon
30 August	15:00	AS Villedomer	1 – 2	EE Pithiviers Dadonville
30 August	15:00	US Cloyes Droué	1 – 1; 3 - 4 pen.	Amicale Épernon
30 August	15:00	AS Anet	0 – 3	Athletic Ymonville
30 August	15:00	A. Escale F. Orléans	4 – 1	CO Cherisy
30 August	15:00	AAAEE Artenay	3 – 2	US Château Renault
30 August	15:00	FC Saint Péravy Ormes	2 – 1	A. Port. SL Dreux
30 August	15:00	AS Trainou	0 – 4	ACS Dreux
30 August	15:00	AS Tout Horizon Dreux	0 – 1	AS Nogent-le-Rotrou

=== Centre-Ouest ===
(Poitou-Charentes) Centre-Ouest
Date	Kick off	Home	Result	Away
29 August	20:00	ES Champniers	2 – 4 a.e.t	AS Saint Yrieix
29 August	20:00	US Chasseneuil	1 – 2	USA Compreignac
29 August	20:00	SL Chateaubernard	0 – 1	ALFC Fontcouverte
29 August	20:00	AJ Montmoreau	1 – 2	US Pons
29 August	20:00	Nercac FC	4 – 2 a.e.t	FC Jonzac Saint-Germain
29 August	20:00	US Aulnay	4 – 0	USM Lusignan
29 August	20:00	Chadenac Marignac	5 – 2	Entente Foot 96
29 August	20:00	DR Chatelaillon	1 – 0	FC Rouille
29 August	20:00	ASM Nieul-sur-Mer	3 – 4	AS Niort Portugais
29 August	20:00	ES Saintes Foot	2 – 1	AS Soyaux
29 August	20:00	USA Saint Aigulin	2 – 1	OFC Ruelle
29 August	20:00	CA Egletons	2 – 0	ES Evaux Budeliere
29 August	20:00	Sainte Fortunade Lagard	3 – 0	AS Nexon
29 August	20:00	AS Seilhac	0 – 2	Condat-sur-Vienne
29 August	20:00	ES Ussel	4 – 0	US Felletin
29 August	20:00	SL Antran	5 – 3	Coulonges-sur-Autize
29 August	20:00	Cenon-sur=Vienne	3 – 0	FC Airvo Saint Jouin
29 August	20:00	US Civray	0 – 0; 4 - 1 pen.	Roumazieres Loubert
29 August	20:00	AS Ingrandes	1 – 9	Terves Esperance
29 August	20:00	FC Loudun	0 – 4	Le Tallud Eveil
29 August	20:00	CS Naintre	2 – 0	Chanteloup Chapelle
29 August	20:00	Saint Maurice Gencay	3 – 0	AS Rethaise
29 August	20:00	Sud 86 Region Couhe	0 – 4	Matha Avenir
29 August	20:00	Le Palais-sur-Vienne	2 – 4	US Oradour-sur-Glane
29 August	20:00	AS Saint Junien	2 – 1 a.e.t	ES Dun Naillat
29 August	20:00	Saint Leonard de Noblat	1 – 2	USS Merinchal
30 August	15:00	US Exideuil	3 – 0	Bessines Morterolles
30 August	15:00	Jarnac Sports	5 – 0	ASFC Vindelle
30 August	15:00	CO La Couronne	3 – 5 a.e.t	Angoulême Basseau
30 August	15:00	Lignieres Gde Chateau	2 – 1	Saint Georges Didonne
30 August	15:00	AS Puymoyen	1 – 2	CS Bussac Foret
30 August	15:00	JS Suris	3 – 2	SC Verrieres
30 August	15:00	AFP Arvert	1 – 0	US Baignes
30 August	15:00	FC Breuil Magne	4 – 2	ES Celles Verrines
30 August	15:00	US Cercoux	6 – 1	ES Linars
30 August	15:00	US Melle	1 – 8	FC Esab 96
30 August	15:00	FC Mirambeau Canton	0 – 2	SC Mouthiers
30 August	15:00	US Rochefort	4 – 1	Esperance Chef Boutonne
30 August	15:00	JS Sireuil	3 – 0	AS Chaniers
30 August	15:00	Saint Palais Sports	1 – 3	Villebois Haute Boeme
30 August	15:00	FC Saint Rogatien	1 – 3	US Vivonne
30 August	15:00	CA Chamboulive	4 – 6	USC Bourganeuf
30 August	15:00	FC Cosnac	1 – 2 a.e.t	JS Limoges Lafarge
30 August	15:00	Jugeals Noailles	1 – 0	Limoges Alouette
30 August	15:00	AS Ladignac le Long	3 – 2	US Donzenac
30 August	15:00	US Lanteuil	1 – 2	AG Pierre Buffiere
30 August	15:00	ASV Malemort	1 – 5	Limoges la Bastide
30 August	15:00	US Saint Clement	3 – 0	Chateauneuf Neuvic
30 August	15:00	AS Tulle Portugais	2 – 0	AS Auzances
30 August	15:00	ES Ussac	1 – 5	SC Limoges Vigenal
30 August	15:00	AC Varetz	1 – 0	ASPTT Limoges
30 August	15:00	Azerables F 2002	0 – 3	SSF Chabanais
30 August	15:00	JS Chambon	1 – 3	CA Meymac
30 August	15:00	US Measnes	0 – 6	US Pressac
30 August	15:00	SC Sardent	4 – 1	CS Bellac
30 August	15:00	Saint Sulpice le Gtois	2 – 6	US Couzeix Chaptelat
30 August	15:00	US Saint Vaury	1 – 2	Saint Savin Saint-Germain
30 August	15:00	AS Aiffres	8 – 3	SFC Saint Xandre
30 August	15:00	ES Aubinrorthais	4 – 0	ES Benassay
30 August	15:00	La Puye La Bussiere	0 – 1	CO Cerizay
30 August	15:00	AR Cherveux	1 – 0	FC Rouillac
30 August	15:00	FC Chiche	1 – 0 a.e.t	CS Dissay
30 August	15:00	Charroux Mauprevoir	0 – 5	UA La Rochefoucauld
30 August	15:00	AS Echire Saint Gelais	2 – 1	FC Oleron
30 August	15:00	AS Ensigne	0 – 2	ES Ecoyeux Venerand
30 August	15:00	FC Haute Val-de-Sevre	0 – 3	AS Cabariot
30 August	15:00	US Lezay	0 – 5	OPMVS La Rochelle
30 August	15:00	Mauze-sur-Mignon	3 – 0	Stade Ruffec
30 August	15:00	SA Moncoutant	2 – 1	FC Montamise
30 August	15:00	Olympique Niort Saint Liguaire	3 – 4	FC Rochefort
30 August	15:00	FC Nueillaubiers	1 – 3	Châtellerault Portugais
30 August	15:00	ES Pinbrecieres	0 – 3	RC Parthenay Viennay
30 August	15:00	Saint Amand-sur-Sevre	0 – 4	US Scorbe Clairvaux
30 August	15:00	Saint Martin les Melle	1 – 7	FC Tonnacquois
30 August	15:00	Saint Pierre Echaubrogn	1 – 2 a.e.t	US Migne Auxances
30 August	15:00	Saint Romans les Melle	4 – 4; 5 - 6 pen.	FC La Jarrie
30 August	15:00	US Saint Sauveur 79	0 – 1	Chasseneuil Poitou
30 August	15:00	US Saint Varent	0 – 3	ES Saint Benoit
30 August	15:00	Stade Vouille 79	2 – 4	Pont L Abbe D Arnoul
30 August	15:00	Voulmentin Saint Aubin	0 – 2	JS Nieuil L Espoir
30 August	15:00	Vrere Saint Leger	3 – 2	CA Neuville
30 August	15:00	US Antoigne	3 – 4 a.e.t	Moutiers-sur-Chantem
30 August	15:00	Availles-en-Chatel	2 – 4	US Combranssiere
30 August	15:00	ES Beaumont Saint Cyr	0 – 7	CA Saint Aubin Le Cloud
30 August	15:00	ES Chateau Larcher	1 – 6	US Marennes
30 August	15:00	Val-de-Boutonne Foot	2 – 2; 5 - 4 pen.	FCPTT Cap Aunis
30 August	15:00	FC Fleure	3 – 2	US Loublanmoulin
30 August	15:00	Fontaine-le-Comte	0 – 7	ES Louzy
30 August	15:00	AS Genouille	0 – 4	FC Fontafie
30 August	15:00	US Jaunay Clan	3 – 2	FC Argentonnais Pays
30 August	15:00	CS Islois	1 – 1; 1 - 3 pen.	ES Mornac
30 August	15:00	Leigne-sur-Usseau	2 – 1	ES Beaulieu Breuil
30 August	15:00	Mignaloux Beauvoir	1 – 2	SA Mouze Rigne
30 August	15:00	ES Poitiers Cites 3	2 – 2; 4 - 2 pen.	ES Gatinaise
30 August	15:00	Saint Georges Les Baill	3 – 0	AS Menigoutais Pays
30 August	15:00	AAS Saint Julien L Ars	1 – 3	US Courlay
30 August	15:00	Champagnac Riviere	2 – 4	US Saint Fiel
30 August	15:00	FCI Cognacois	3 – 4	ES Benevent Marsac
30 August	15:00	AS Flavignac	4 – 2	US Troche
30 August	15:00	Limoges Landouge	2 – 3 a.e.t	ES Nonards
30 August	15:00	Limoges Saint Louis Val	3 – 0	AS Saint Pantaleon
30 August	15:00	AS Panazol	2 – 2; 2 - 4 pen.	FC Argentat
30 August	15:00	FC Saint Brice-sur-Vienne	3 – 1 a.e.t	FCC Oradour-sur-Vayres
30 August	15:00	Saint Laurent Eglises	0 – 4	AS Chamberet

=== Champagne-Ardenne ===
Champagne-Ardenne
Date	Kick off	Home	Result	Away
30 August	15:00	ES Charleville	3 – 4	Villers Semeuse
30 August	15:00	CA Montherme	0 – 6	FC Chooz
30 August	15:00	US Deville	3 – 11	FC Bogny
30 August	15:00	US Nouzonville	2 – 0	Tournes Renwez Maz
30 August	15:00	US Machault	1 – 3	AS Asfeld
30 August	15:00	Bourg Rocroi	1 – 0	Maubert Fontaine
30 August	15:00	US Deux Vireux	5 – 0	FC Flohimont
30 August	15:00	FC Heybes	3 – 6	Revin Orzy
30 August	15:00	US Revin	2 – 0	US Fumay
30 August	15:00	Auvillers Signy	1 – 2	FC Liart
30 August	15:00	Neuville This	2 – 0	Signy L'Abbaye
30 August	15:00	Chateau Porcien	0 – 7	Sault Rethel
30 August	15:00	AS Monthois	2 – 2; 3 - 4 pen.	USA Le Chesne
30 August	15:00	AS Damouzy	1 – 4	USC Nouvion
30 August	15:00	Blagny Carignan	0 – 4	Sedan Torcy
30 August	15:00	AS Mouzon	2 – 2; 2 - 3 pen.	Carignan Linay
30 August	15:00	US Balan	3 – 1	JS Vrigne
30 August	15:00	FC Neufmanil	3 – 1	Charleville France-Turcs
30 August	15:00	Le Theux	4 – 1	US Hannogne
30 August	15:00	AS Givonne	2 – 1 a.e.t	ES Floing
30 August	15:00	Douzy-qui-Vive	3 – 1	Cheveuges
30 August	15:00	US Vendeuvre	3 – 1	Bagneux Clesles
30 August	15:00	ASS Brienne	0 – 2	Essor Melda
30 August	15:00	Maizieres Chatres	1 – 3	Troyes Nouvel Elan
30 August	15:00	Trois Vallees	1 – 4	AFM Romilly
30 August	15:00	RC Saint Andre	2 – 0	Romilly Sports
30 August	15:00	USCN Nogentaise	0 – 10	Riviere Corps
30 August	15:00	JSFC Saint Julien	5 – 2	Pont Sainte Marie
30 August	15:00	US Crancey	0 – 11	F. Barsequanais
30 August	15:00	Yanne Pays D'Othe	2 – 6	Etoile Chapelaine
30 August	15:00	Marigny Saint Martin	0 – 5	JS Vaudoise
30 August	15:00	Vaudes Animation	0 – 2	FC N0gentais
30 August	15:00	Aube Sud Loisirs	5 – 1	Saint Germain Amicale
30 August	15:00	Valiant Fontaine	2 – 1	US Dienville
30 August	15:00	AS Sainte Savine	0 – 3	FC Saint Mesmin
30 August	15:00	AS Tertre	6 – 3 a.e.t	ES Bar Bayel
30 August	15:00	Juvigny	0 – 4	Olympique Chalons
30 August	15:00	Berru Lavannes	1 – 5	Reims Murigny Franco
30 August	15:00	Bignicourt-Saulx	3 – 0	Bignicourt Frignicou
30 August	15:00	Rilly La Montagne	2 – 2; 5 - 4 pen.	FC Sillery
30 August	15:00	PACA Reims	0 – 2	Reims Neuvillette
30 August	15:00	US Dizy	4 – 2	Betheny Formation
30 August	15:00	Cernay Les Reims	3 – 2	Épernay Portugais
30 August	15:00	Avize Grauves	4 – 0	FC Saint Memmie
30 August	15:00	USS Sermaize	0 – 0; 4 - 5 pen.	FC Argonne
30 August	15:00	SC Bazancourt	0 – 2	Ambonnay Bouzy
30 August	15:00	Connantre Corroy	2 – 1	Cote des Blancs
30 August	15:00	Compertrix Foyer	2 – 3	US Couvrot
30 August	15:00	AS Cheminon	0 – 4	La Chaussee
30 August	15:00	AS Marolles	3 – 3; 4 - 2 pen.	Loisy-sur-Marne
30 August	15:00	FC de la Vesle	5 – 1	US Fismes
30 August	15:00	Gueux Pargny	3 – 1	SC Dormans
30 August	15:00	SC Montmirial	3 – 0	Saint Martin Ablois
30 August	15:00	Maurupt Montois	1 – 4	Pargny-sur-Saulx
30 August	15:00	Reims Jamin Amicale	2 – 3	Nord Champagne
30 August	15:00	Mourmelon Livry	4 – 3	Vitry Portugais Unis
30 August	15:00	Witry Les Reims	1 – 3	ASPTT Chalons
30 August	15:00	Courtisois Estan	1 – 1; 3 - 4 pen.	Olympic Suippes
30 August	15:00	ES Fagnieres	3 – 2	FC Vitry
30 August	15:00	FC Saint Gibrien	1 – 5	Saint Martin La Veuve
30 August	15:00	US Ageville	2 – 0	Inter FAC
30 August	15:00	SS Prez Lafauche	3 – 3; 7 - 6 pen.	Hallignicourt
30 August	15:00	US Bourbonne	2 – 1	CA Rolampont
30 August	15:00	Langres Lusitanos	2 – 3	Prauthoy Vaux
30 August	15:00	Champaigny Les Langre	0 – 1	Corgirnon Chauden
30 August	15:00	Neuilly L'Eveque	1 – 2 a.e.t	US Rouvres
30 August	15:00	FC Bologne	0 – 1	AS Nogent
30 August	15:00	Arc-en-Barrois	2 – 9	Chaumont PTT
30 August	15:00	Bourmont Graffigny	2 – 3	STS Geosmes
30 August	15:00	SL L'Ornel	0 – 6	Andelot Rimaucourt
30 August	15:00	Joinville Vecqueville	1 – 3	Villiers-en-Lieu
30 August	15:00	Diane D'Eurville	3 – 0	Montier-en-Der
30 August	15:00	Foyer Bayard	0 – 2	Vaux-sur-Blaise
30 August	15:00	Bragard Cheminots	2 – 1	Stade Chevillon
30 August	15:00	US Flize	1 – 2	US Bazeilles

=== Franche-Comté ===
Franche-Comté
Date	Kick off	Home	Result	Away
22 August	19:30	Luxeuil-les-Bains	3 – 1 a.e.t	Giro Lepuix
22 August	19:30	Besançon Velotte	0 – 3	Besançon Athletic Club
23 August	15:00	Portugais Montbéliard	1 – 3	AS Bavilliers
23 August	15:00	AGE Longevelle	2 – 4 a.e.t	Voujeaucourt Bethoncourt
23 August	15:00	AS Beaucourt	2 – 7	GJ SCEY Haute Lizaine
23 August	15:00	UOP Mathay	2 – 4	AS Herimoncourt
23 August	15:00	Appenans Mancenans	1 – 2	Exincourt Taillecour
23 August	15:00	FC Seloncourt	1 – 0	US Bavans
23 August	15:00	Dampierre Foot	1 – 5	Presentev. Sainte Marie
23 August	15:00	ADPC Montenois	4 – 1	Nommay-Vaulx-Charmont
23 August	15:00	Berche Dampierre	1 – 4 a.e.t	SG Hericourt
23 August	15:00	FC Courtelevant	6 – 2	Saint Maurice-Colombes Blus
23 August	15:00	ES Belleherbe	4 – 1	AS Abbevillers
23 August	15:00	Danjoutin Ande Merou	1 – 2 a.e.t	Forges Audincourt
23 August	15:00	US Sochaux	1 – 0	FC Pays Minier
23 August	15:00	SR Villars-sous-Dampjoux	2 – 0	US Bourogne
23 August	15:00	PS Dole Crissey	0 – 3	FC Aiglepierre
23 August	15:00	FC Gevry	0 – 2	Olympique Montmorot
23 August	15:00	FC Salins	0 – 4	Val d'Amour Mont-sous-Vaudrey
23 August	15:00	US Crotenay	0 – 2	CS Frasne
23 August	15:00	Doubs Et Loue	0 – 9	AS Foucherans
23 August	15:00	RC Chaux-Du-Dombief	2 – 0	AS Arinthod
23 August	15:00	FC Bois D Amont	0 – 1	'US Coteaux De Seille
23 August	15:00	ES Marnay	1 – 3	FC Val De Loue
23 August	15:00	Damparis FC	3 – 7	FC Poligny
23 August	15:00	Vesoul Colombe	3 – 1 a.e.t	AS Melisey-Saint Barthelemy
23 August	15:00	US Sceycolaise	1 – 0	MJ Jasney
23 August	15:00	L'Entente Athesans-Gouhenans	3 – 4	Rougemont Concorde
23 August	15:00	Jussey-Vitrey	1 – 2 a.e.t	CS Portusien
23 August	15:00	FC Du Lac	Reserved	FC de Lisle-Doubs
23 August	15:00	Auxon Miserey Pel	1 – 1; 2 - 3 pen.	AS Perrousienne
23 August	15:00	MFR Aillevillers	3 – 2	AS Fougerolles
23 August	15:00	Combeaufontaine Lavo	3 – 1 a.e.t	Breurey Les Fav
23 August	15:00	FC Le Russey	5 – 1	Massif Haut Doubs
23 August	15:00	Thise-Chalezeule FC	3 – 0	Besançon Montrapon
23 August	15:00	FC Chatillon Devecey	1 – 4	US Larians Munans
23 August	15:00	US Doubs	1 – 2	ASE Evillers
23 August	15:00	US Les Fontenelles	2 – 7	US Les Ecorces
23 August	15:00	École Pirey	5 – 0	Avanne-Aveney
23 August	15:00	AS Chateau De Joux	3 – 0	Les Fonges 91
23 August	15:00	L'ES Bretonvillers	0 – 12	Les Fins
23 August	15:00	AS Saône Mamirolle	Reserved	Les Quatre Monts
23 August	15:00	ES Entre Roches	2 – 2; 4 - 3 pen.	Montfaucon Mor. Gen
23 August	15:00	ES Charquemont	3 – 3; 4 - 3 pen.	LA Chaux Gilley
23 August	15:00	Pierrefontaine Lavir	3 – 2	Villers Le Lac

=== French Guiana ===
French Guiana
Date	Kick off	Home	Result	Away
11 September	20:00	AJ Saint Grand Cayenne	3 – 0	US Saint-Elie
11 September	20:00	Le Geldar de Kourou	3 – 1	Olympique de Cayenne
12 September	15:30	AS Oyapock	4 – 0	AFC Montsinery
12 September	15:30	USL Montjoly	0 – 2	AS Grand Santi
12 September	15:30	E. Filante Iracoubo	0 – 3	ASC Remire
12 September	15:30	ASC de Favard	0 – 10	US Macouria
12 September	15:30	ASC Black Stars	2 – 0	FC Arawack Matoury
12 September	15:30	ASC Agouado	4 – 0	ASC de Roura
12 September	16:00	AS Red Star Cayenne	3 – 3; 3 - 1 pen.	AOJ Mana
12 September	16:00	US Sinnamary	3 – 0	AJS Maroni
12 September	16:00	Kourou FC	0 – 1	CO Saint Laurent
12 September	16:00	ASC Kawina Papaic	0 – 3	AJ de Balata Abrib
12 September	16:00	ASC Corssonu	1 – 4	SC Kourou

=== French Polynesia ===
French Polynesia
Date	Kick off	Home	Result	Away
10 January	20:00	AS Venus	1 – 0	AS Excelsior
10 January	20:00	AS Pirae	0 – 2	AS Manu-Ura
10 January	20:00	AS Vaiarii	1 – 6	AS Vaiete
11 January	20:00	AS Samine	0 – 2	AS Tefana
11 January	20:00	AS Temanava	2 – 0	AS Tamarii Punaruu
11 January	20:00	AS Tiari Tahiti	2 – 0	AS Jeunes Tahitiens
11 January	20:00	AS Dragon	3 – 3; 4 - 5 pen.	Tahiti U-20
11 January	20:00	AS Tamarii Faa'a	0 – 0; 1 - 3 pen.	AS Taravao AC

=== Guadeloupe ===
Guadeloupe
Date	Kick off	Home	Result	Away
28 August	20:00	Camaz 89	1 – 2	Cygne Noir
28 August	15:00	Racing Club de Basse-Terre	1 – 0	Club Juventa
28 August	15:00	U.S.A.	2 – 2 Pen.	U.S.G
28 August	15:00	Sporting Club	1 – 4	ASC Amdiana
28 August	15:00	Dynamo Le Moule	2 – 1	Cactus Sainte Anne
28 August	15:00	A.J.S.F	1 – 1 Pen.	Olympic ML
28 August	15:00	Club Qualifier	–	Winner Preliminary Match 1
28 August	15:00	Jeunesse Evolution	1 – 0	Etoile Filante
28 August	15:00	Éclair	1 – 1 Pen.	Zenith Club
29 August	15:00	S.L.A.C	2 – 3	J.S.C
29 August	15:00	Phare de Vieux-Fort	2 – 0	CS Bouillantais
29 August	15:00	Real Club	–	Arsenal
29 August	15:00	Siroco Abymes	1 – 0	Etoile du Carmel
29 August	15:00	AS Nenuphars	3 – 1	Juventus SA
29 August	15:00	Colonial Club	1 – 1 Pen.	J.V.F
29 August	15:00	U.S.C.B	1 – 0	Intrepide SA
30 August	15:00	CS Capesterre Bell	3 – 1	Alliance FC
30 August	15:00	Equinoxe	5 – 1	Juvenis

=== Haute-Normandie ===
Haute-Normandie
Date	Kick off	Home	Result	Away
30 August	15:00	Prey FC	2 – 3	Mont Saint Michel
30 August	15:00	CA Saint-Germain	1 – 1; 5 - 4 pen.	US Cormeilles Lieurey
30 August	15:00	ES Vallee L Oison	3 – 2	US Gravigny
30 August	15:00	AS Charentonne	3 – 0	Grosley FCO
30 August	15:00	FJEP Aviron	1 – 3	FER Fidelaire
30 August	15:00	RC Muids Vauvray	6 – 0	AS Louviers Turque
30 August	15:00	ES Damville	2 – 3 a.e.t	SC Quittebeuf
30 August	15:00	FA Du Roumoi	2 – 6	AS Routot
30 August	15:00	FC Val de Risle	0 – 2	FC Le Bel Air
30 August	15:00	EF Gisors Bezu	1 – 2	PT Romil. Saint Paul
30 August	15:00	VS Vaudreuil	0 – 1	Sporting Gasny
30 August	15:00	AS Saint Marcel	2 – 1	Madrie Seine FC
30 August	15:00	SC Bernay	0 – 3	CA Audemer Pont
30 August	15:00	US Conches	2 – 5	SPN Vernon
30 August	15:00	ASP La Neuve Lyre	2 – 1	FC Avrais
30 August	15:00	SC Thiberville	5 – 1	CS Bourg Achard Roumoi
30 August	15:00	Harcourt Neuv	2 – 4	AS Courbepine
30 August	15:00	US Etrepagny	2 – 1	AS Courcelloise
30 August	15:00	FR Garennes	2 – 1	L'Entente Vexin Dangu
30 August	15:00	CH Emmallevil	1 – 4	Fle. Vallee AN
30 August	15:00	US Rugles	1 – 3	ASPTT Évreux
30 August	15:00	Mesnil Vallee D Avre	1 – 3	US Portugais de Évreux
30 August	15:00	SO Saint Andre	1 – 2	ES Normanville
30 August	15:00	Saint-Leu VO 95	0 – 0; 1 - 3 pen.	Stade Hénin-Beaumont
30 August	15:00	Ecos Vexin Sud FC	2 – 8	AS Vesly
30 August	15:00	FC Epegard	2 – 1	AMS Hondouville
30 August	15:00	CS La Bonneville	2 – 3 a.e.t	Illiers L Eve
30 August	15:00	JS Arnieres	3 – 1	CS Les Andelys
30 August	15:00	AS Manneville	3 – 2 a.e.t	FC Serq. Nassan.
30 August	15:00	US Louviers	6 – 2	Saint Sebastien Sports
30 August	15:00	CS Ivry La Batai	4 – 1	RC Malherbesurville
30 August	15:00	FC Elbeuf	0 – 3	ANS Mesnil Franqu
30 August	15:00	US Forges	0 – 1	SC Pt Couronne
30 August	15:00	FC Isneauville	3 – 0	Olympique de Darnetal
30 August	15:00	Saint Leger Bonsecours	1 – 1; 4 - 3 pen.	Canton Arguei
30 August	15:00	ASPTT R.	0 – 5	RC Caudebec
30 August	15:00	CO Cleon	1 – 2	Deville Marom
30 August	15:00	Amfreville La Mivoie	4 – 2	CC Sotteville
30 August	15:00	Quincam. Plat.	0 – 3	FC Saint-Étienne Du R.
30 August	15:00	US Houppeville	1 – 0 a.e.t	Stade Grand Quevilly
30 August	15:00	AS Roncherolles	2 – 3	FC Boos.
30 August	15:00	AML Tourville La Riviere FC	1 – 2	AS Gournay
30 August	15:00	US Saint-Saëns	0 – 14	FC Grand Quevilly
30 August	15:00	FUSC Boisguillaume	0 – 3	FC Saint Aubin Les El.
30 August	15:00	US Grammont	1 – 1; 0 - 3 pen.	Athletic Malaunay
30 August	15:00	AS Bouille Moulineaux	1 – 3	Houlme Bondev
30 August	15:00	FC Cleres Nord Ouest	0 – 1	CCRP Saint-Étienne
30 August	15:00	FC Gaillefontaine	3 – 2	FC Rouen Sapins
30 August	15:00	GCO Bihorel	7 – 1	AS Buchy
30 August	15:00	FC Vieux Manoir	0 – 15	US Pont L Arche
30 August	15:00	AS Montivilliers	2 – 1	AM H. Neiges
30 August	15:00	AC Tancarvilleac	0 – 1	CA Harfleur Beaulieu
30 August	15:00	AC Gainneville	0 – 1	AS Cheminots Havrais
30 August	15:00	JS Fontenay	0 – 3	US Lillebonne
30 August	15:00	Trouville Alliquervi	1 – 2	US Trefileries
30 August	15:00	AC Bolbec	3 – 3; 4 - 2 pen.	SC Octeville
30 August	15:00	FC Rolleville	1 – 3 a.e.t	Crique. Cap-de-Caux
30 August	15:00	Gruchet-Valas	0 – 0; 4 - 3 pen.	H. Port Autono
30 August	15:00	ESPC Saint Gilles Etain	0 – 7	Sportif Havre Caucriauville
30 August	15:00	Saint Antoine La Foret	3 – 7 a.e.t	AMS Saint Addresse
30 August	15:00	AS La Frenaye	2 – 9	CS Gravenchon
30 August	15:00	JS Breaute.	0 – 4	SC Havre Frileuse
30 August	15:00	SS Gournay En Caux	0 – 3	Havre Mont Gailla
30 August	15:00	AC Ecrainville	1 – 11	AC Saint Romain
30 August	15:00	RC Havre Dollemard	0 – 8	CSS Municipaux Havre
30 August	15:00	Fontaine U.	2 – 3	ASJ Bolbec Fontaine Martel
30 August	15:00	US Goderville	3 – 1	US Yebleron
30 August	15:00	FC Turretot Saint Maurice-Mannevi	1 – 3	AS Sanvic Rena Havre
30 August	15:00	USF Fecamp	1 – 0	Havre Saint Thomas
30 August	15:00	Saint Pierre En Val 91	2 – 3	FC Totes
30 August	15:00	JS Meulers	2 – 1	Saint Nicolas D Aliermo
30 August	15:00	FC Belleville	0 – 0; 3 - 4 pen.	ASPTT Neufchatel
30 August	15:00	US Basse-Saane	1 – 0	US Greges
30 August	15:00	AJC Bosc-le-Hard	0 – 8	FC Eu.
30 August	15:00	CA Longueville-sur-Scie	1 – 2	Plateau-Assoc
30 August	15:00	RC Etalondes	2 – 5	ES Arques-la-Bataille
30 August	15:00	JS Brachy	0 – 21	FC Cany
30 August	15:00	AS Saint Remy Boscrocourt	2 – 2; 4 - 2 pen.	ES Tourville Sur Arques
30 August	15:00	Saint Valery-en-Caux	1 – 0	US Envermeu
30 August	15:00	Yerville FC	1 – 5	US Doudeville
30 August	15:00	AC Janval	6 – 1	US Bouvaincourt
30 August	15:00	US Bacqueville	2 – 1	AC Yvetot
30 August	15:00	CO Saint Arnoult	1 – 0 a.e.t	US Auppegard
30 August	15:00	AC Neuville	2 – 4 a.e.t	US Criel-sur-mer
30 August	15:00	US Paluel	1 – 6	FC Barentin
30 August	15:00	AS Ourville	4 – 0	ES Bouville
30 August	15:00	AS Sasse-Theroul	0 – 4	AS Fauville
30 August	15:00	JS Etoutteville	3 – 0	US Auffay
30 August	15:00	FC Flocques	0 – 3	US Londinieres
30 August	15:00	FC Bailly-en-Riviere	1 – 2	RC Pontois
30 August	15:00	AS Varengeville	1 – 0	AS Le Treport
30 August	15:00	FC Petit Caux	2 – 1	AS Mesnieres
30 August	15:00	Les Grandes Ventes	1 – 5	ES Aumale
30 August	15:00	CS Theuville	1 – 5	US Hericourt
30 August	15:00	Saint Pierre De Varenge	0 – 4	FC Le Trait Duclair
30 August	15:00	US Angiens	1 – 2	SPC Freville
30 August	15:00	FC Boucle-Seine	1 – 2	Olympique Pavilly
30 August	15:00	FC Offranville	5 – 1	AS Incheville

=== Languedoc-Roussillon ===
Languedoc-Roussillon
Date	Kick off	Home	Result	Away
23 August	15:00	Olympique Cuxac Aude	–	AS Carcassonne Morocco
23 August	15:00	Laure Haut Minervois	3 – 2	VFAC Carcassonne
23 August	15:00	FC Pennautier	1 – 3	FC Carcassonnais
23 August	15:00	Villedubertois FC	1 – 3	AS Castelnaudary
23 August	15:00	US Conques	1 – 5	FU Narbonne
23 August	15:00	FC Alaric Capendu	3 – 1	AS Bram
23 August	15:00	Caux-Sauzens FC	0 – 7	FC Cazilhac
23 August	15:00	Le Cougaing FC	2 – 2; 4 - 5 pen.	Limoux Pieuse
23 August	15:00	FC Haute Vallee	–	FC Chalabre
23 August	15:00	L'Entente Fitou Leucate	0 – 4	MJC Gruissan
23 August	15:00	Naurouze Lab	0 – 1	USA Pezens
23 August	15:00	US Du Minervois	0 – 3	FC Trebes
23 August	15:00	FC Ventenac	–	US Villardonnel
23 August	15:00	FC Saint Nazairois	7 – 0	Olympique Saissac Club
23 August	15:00	SO Rivesaltes	2 – 2; 4 - 3 pen.	SC Port La Nouvelle
23 August	15:00	US Bompas	0 – 2	FC Perpignan Canet
23 August	15:00	FC Elne	0 – 1	Olympique Club Perpignan
23 August	15:00	FC Ille-sur-Tet	0 – 3	Perpignan Méditerranée
23 August	15:00	Le Soler FC	0 – 1	OC Cabestany
23 August	15:00	Saint Louis Salanque	0 – 5	Alberes-Argeles
23 August	15:00	Cerdagne Capcir	–	AS Prades
23 August	15:00	Vallespir FC	Reserved	FC Vallee BECE
23 August	15:00	OC Saleilles	0 – 1	Olympique Alenya
23 August	15:00	Vellin. Raho	Reserved	FC Saint Esteves
23 August	15:00	FA Saint Cyprien	–	FC Thuir
23 August	15:00	Cournonterral FC	–	AS Canet
23 August	15:00	Stade Meze	1 – 1; 3 - 2 pen.	FC Clermontaise
23 August	15:00	FC Lespignan Vendres	1 – 2	FC Lamalou
23 August	15:00	USO Florensac Pinet	0 – 4	AS Fabregues
23 August	15:00	Balaruc-Bains	0 – 1	AS Frontignan
23 August	15:00	Baill. Saint Bres Valer	–	AS Lattes
23 August	15:00	CS Marseillan	2 – 2; 5 - 4 pen.	Castelnau Cr.
23 August	15:00	Olympique La Peyrade	–	Petit Bard Mont FC
23 August	15:00	Cazouls-Marau	–	ES Paulhan
23 August	15:00	FC Sussargues	–	JS De Tinchebray
23 August	15:00	FC Carrouges	–	La Gde. Motte Pyramid
23 August	15:00	Valras Serignan	0 – 3	FC Sète
23 August	15:00	Saint Gely-Fesc	1 – 5	PCAC Sète
23 August	15:00	FR Caux	3 – 1	ES Fraisse La Sa
23 August	15:00	US Athis	–	Athletic de Messei
23 August	15:00	Montpellier Saint Martin	1 – 0	Castries Av.
23 August	15:00	FC Prades Le Lez	–	Montpellier Arceaux
23 August	15:00	FC Montpeyroux	2 – 2; 3 - 2 pen.	Montpellier Atlas Paillade
23 August	15:00	ES Montbazin	2 – 8	Montpellier Espoir Avenir
23 August	15:00	ASPTT Montpellier	3 – 1	US Montagnac
23 August	15:00	AS Roujan	1 – 1; 2 - 4 pen.	L'Entente Portiragnes Vias
23 August	15:00	AS Montarnaud	–	RC Ganges
23 August	15:00	Pezenas Tourbes	6 – 1	Capestang Montpellier Lirou
23 August	15:00	AS Pouzols	1 – 2	FC Nebian
23 August	15:00	SF Montblanc	1 – 2	Olympique Saint-Andre Sangonis
23 August	15:00	FC Servain	0 – 2	Puissalicon Magalas
23 August	15:00	RC Saint Clement De Fos	–	Sète Le Social
23 August	15:00	L'Entente Saint Clement Mont	3 – 2 a.e.t	ES Perols
23 August	15:00	Saint Pargoire	–	US Villeveyrac
23 August	15:00	EC Airois	1 – 0	FC Meze
23 August	15:00	AS Saint Mathieu	0 – 3	PI Vendergues
23 August	15:00	US Maisons	–	FC Des Etangs
23 August	15:00	Saint Genies-Mou	3 – 1 a.e.t	GS Saint Aunes
23 August	15:00	SC Jacou	0 – 3	US Grabels
23 August	15:00	SO Lansargues	3 – 2	AS Pignan
23 August	15:00	Saint Jean-Vedas	2 – 4	US Mauguio
23 August	15:00	Laverune FC	2 – 4	CA Poussan
23 August	15:00	Villers Maguelone	0 – 3	CE Palavas
23 August	15:00	Nord Gazelec	1 – 0	GC Lunel
23 August	15:00	Aigues Vives Aubais	0 – 9	Aigues-Mortes
23 August	15:00	Stade Aimargues	0 – 3	GC Gallargues
23 August	15:00	AS Badaroux	5 – 1	AS Chanac
23 August	15:00	AS Le Mejean	0 – 9	Stade Marvejols
23 August	15:00	Tarn-Tarnon	0 – 7	Mende Av. Foot Lozere
23 August	15:00	FC Rocles	0 – 3	FC Valdonnez
23 August	15:00	FC Margeride	–	AS Meyrueis
23 August	15:00	AFC Barjac 48	1 – 4	ES Chirac
23 August	15:00	Chastel Nouvelle	2 – 1	AS Le Malzieu
23 August	15:00	AS Le Collet	5 – 2	Alès Sedisud
23 August	15:00	Chusclan Laudun	0 – 2	Olympique Alès
23 August	15:00	Brouzet Alès	3 – 3; 4 - 2 pen.	AS Alès Moulinet
23 August	15:00	Alès Metaux Tamaris	2 – 5	ES Barjac
23 August	15:00	Chamborigaud FC	1 – 2	AS Cendras
23 August	15:00	VAL Saint Martin	3 – 0	AS Des Cevennes
23 August	15:00	AS Bagard	5 – 1	FC Alès Rochebelle
23 August	15:00	Pontil Pradel	2 – 2; 4 - 5 pen.	AS Anduze
23 August	15:00	Le Grau Du Roi	0 – 2	Stade Beaucaire 30
23 August	15:00	SO Boissieres	0 – 4	Moulins Bezouce 3
23 August	15:00	Olympique Cardet	0 – 3	Saint Hilaire La Jasse
23 August	15:00	Castanet Nord	6 – 1	PVAFC Le Vigan
23 August	15:00	La Gd. Combe	2 – 12	AS Salindres
23 August	15:00	Les Mages Auzonnet	Reserved	Champclauson Alès FC
23 August	15:00	ES Saint Jean Du Pin	0 – 7	EP Vergèze
23 August	15:00	JS Bernis	6 – 0	FC Vauvert
23 August	15:00	CA Besseges	5 – 1	FC Nîmes Zup Nord
23 August	15:00	Caissargues FC	1 – 3 a.e.t	SC Manduel
23 August	15:00	AM Ledignan	1 – 5	US Monoblet
23 August	15:00	OSC Langlade	2 – 8	US Garons
23 August	15:00	Rochef Signar	1 – 3	Bagnols Pont
23 August	15:00	L'Entente Saint Chaptes Gardon	0 – 2	MAL Saint Genies
23 August	15:00	Saint Christol Lez Alès	4 – 7	Nord Lasallien
23 August	15:00	Rochessadoule FC	2 – 12	AEC Saint Gilles
23 August	15:00	SO Codognan	3 – 0	Canabier FC
23 August	15:00	RC Generac	2 – 1	FC Jonquieres
23 August	15:00	SC Saint Gilles	Reserved	GC Uchaud
23 August	15:00	OC Redessan	2 – 0	US Sommieres
23 August	15:00	ES Theziers	Reserved	GC Gallician
23 August	15:00	ES Sumene	2 – 0	AS Saint Privat
23 August	15:00	FC Moussac	3 – 7 a.e.t	ES Marquerittes

=== Maine ===
(Pays de la Loire) Maine
Date	Kick off	Home	Result	Away
30 August	15:00	CA Voutré	1 – 3	FC Ambrieres
30 August	15:00	FC Bais Montaigu	3 – 0	US Saint Pierre La Cour
30 August	15:00	Saint Germain Coul.	0 – 6	US Bourgon
30 August	15:00	US Laval Réunion	4 – 1	AS Neau
30 August	15:00	Moulay Sports	4 – 4; 4 - 3 pen.	US Chantrigné
30 August	15:00	US Desertines	2 – 4 a.e.t	USCP Montsurs
30 August	15:00	ASF Les Verchers-Saint-Georges	4 – 3	US Cigné
30 August	15:00	AS Montaudin	1 – 0	US Fougerolles
30 August	15:00	AS Brée	2 – 5 a.e.t	US Le Horps
30 August	15:00	AS Vaiges	0 – 2	AG Laigné
30 August	15:00	AS Argenton	3 – 8	US Saint Denis Anjou
30 August	15:00	US Argentré	5 – 3	Athletique Cuillé-Saint-Poix
30 August	15:00	ES Pommerieux	1 – 1; 3 - 2 pen.	ES Azé
30 August	15:00	AS Saint Aignan-sur-Roë	5 – 2	FC Bierné-Gennes
30 August	15:00	JG Coudray	0 – 3	ES Maisoncelles
30 August	15:00	FC Montjean	1 – 1; 11 - 10 pen.	AS Ballée
30 August	15:00	FC Ménil	1 – 4	AS Chemazé
30 August	15:00	AS Laval Finances	2 – 3	US Renazé
30 August	15:00	SS Souge Le Ganelon	2 – 1	JS Allonnes
30 August	15:00	US Boesse Le Sec	2 – 3	US Savigne L Eveque
30 August	15:00	FC Savigne L Eveque	5 – 3	US Conlie
30 August	15:00	CO Cormes	4 – 1	AS Sarge Les Le Mans
30 August	15:00	AS Saint Paterne	3 – 0	US Bouloire
30 August	15:00	AS Cures	2 – 3	US Rouesse Vasse
30 August	15:00	ES Saint Longis	1 – 2	OS Dollon
30 August	15:00	US La Chapelle-Saint Remy	3 – 0	AS Mont-Saint-Jean
30 August	15:00	Marolles Les Braults	1 – 2 a.e.t	US Le Luart
30 August	15:00	Cerans Foulletourte	4 – 2	JS Volnay
30 August	15:00	US Villaines	5 – 1	ES Champagne
30 August	15:00	Saint Calais Anille Braye	0 – 1	CO Laigne-Saint Gervais
30 August	15:00	JS Solesmes	3 – 2	PTT Le Mans
30 August	15:00	SO Maine Le Mans	0 – 2	US Saint Ouen-Saint Biez
30 August	15:00	US Roeze-Sarthe	2 – 2; 3 - 1 pen.	CA Loue
30 August	15:00	US Mansigne	–	US Oize
30 August	15:00	Mayet Vigilante	3 – 0	AS Neuville-Sarthe
30 August	15:00	SS Noyen-Sarthe	2 – 1	Pontvallain France

=== Méditerranée ===
(Provence-Alpes-Côte d'Azur) Méditerranée
Date	Kick off	Home	Result	Away
29 August	17:00	JS des Pennes Mira	1 – 2	Avignon Foot 84
29 August	17:00	US Eygalieres	0 – 6	AS Saint Remy
29 August	17:00	FC de Mougins Cote	2 – 2; 3 - 2 pen.	Saint Laurentin Saint Lau
29 August	19:30	Olympique le Lavandou Sports	2 – 1 a.e.t	FCUS Tropez
29 August	20:00	ES Vitrolles	0 – 4	AS Gemenosienne
30 August	15:00	FC Savinois	1 – 2	US Les Mees
30 August	15:00	FC de Sisteron	6 – 1	ES Moyenne Durance
30 August	15:00	Valens-Greoux	4 – 1	Laragne Sports
30 August	15:00	US Veynes	0 – 3	L'Avance FC
30 August	15:00	Esperance Bassin Min	0 – 4	AS Gignacaise
30 August	15:00	Biot	0 – 2	CDJ-ASOA
30 August	15:00	Mayotte Cote Azur	1 – 0	ESRV Nice
30 August	15:00	SC Mouans Sartoux	2 – 0	US Pegomas
30 August	15:00	LN Mandelieu	1 – 3	AS Vence
30 August	15:00	SPST La Colle	2 – 3	Carros
30 August	15:00	ESVL Football	4 – 5 a.e.t	US Cagnes
30 August	15:00	ES Saint Andre	0 – 3	SC Dracenie
30 August	15:00	US Cannes Bocca	2 – 3	JS Saint Jean Beaulieu
30 August	15:00	ES Pennoise	2 – 1	SC Berre
30 August	15:00	CA Plan de Cuques	0 – 4	Istres Rassuen FC
30 August	15:00	ES Milloise	1 – 1; 2 - 4 pen.	align=centerSCOC La Cayolle
30 August	15:00	Rousset FC	0 – 3	Olympique Barbentane
30 August	15:00	Sainte Am. Bel-Air-Salo	1 – 4 a.e.t	EUGA Ardziv
30 August	15:00	ASPTT La Ciota	1 – 0 a.e.t	ASCJ Fpyat
30 August	15:00	Smuc	0 – 6	ARS Belsunce
30 August	15:00	AA Vot Service	2 – 3	SO Septemes
30 August	15:00	ASF Iris	0 – 1	US 1er Canton
30 August	15:00	Aubagne FC	1 – 1; 1 - 3 pen.	ES Fosseenne
30 August	15:00	SC Roquevaire	1 – 2	AS Aixoise
30 August	15:00	US Venelles	3 – 0	FC Rocassier
30 August	15:00	ES Port Saint Louis	4 – 2 a.e.t	AC Port-de-Bouc
30 August	15:00	USM Meyreuil	2 – 1	SC Saint Martinois
30 August	15:00	SC Jonquieres	1 – 4	SC Courthezon
30 August	15:00	E. Aubune	1 – 4	Carpentras FC
30 August	15:00	SOC Villelaure	1 – 4	SC Orange
30 August	15:00	CFC Avignon	2 – 0	BC Isle
30 August	15:00	USR Pertuis	2 – 0	FC Villeneuve
30 August	15:00	Olympique Saint Romain	0 – 9	FC Tarascon
30 August	15:00	ES Maussane	0 – 1	ESP Pernes
30 August	15:00	ES Apt	2 – 4	SC Gadagne
30 August	15:00	US Thoroise	0 – 2	SC Montfavet
30 August	15:00	SDE Maillane	0 – 3	Nyons FC
30 August	15:00	US Orange Gres	2 – 1	Monclar FC
30 August	15:00	US Caderousse	1 – 0	FA Val Durance
30 August	15:00	ARC Cavaillon	0 – 8	US Autre Provence
30 August	15:00	FA Chateaurenard	4 – 2 a.e.t	US Avignon
30 August	15:00	ES Bessillon	0 – 9	Saint Zacharie
30 August	15:00	SO La Londe	3 – 4	Antibes
30 August	15:00	Olympique Saint Maximois	1 – 2	AS Maximois
30 August	15:00	ES Lorgues	0 – 3	Olympique Rovenain
30 August	15:00	EV Issole	2 – 5	AS Giens
30 August	15:00	Puget-sur-Argens FC	2 – 3	US Carq-Crau
30 August	15:00	AS Brignoles	3 – 4	Sollies Farlede
30 August	15:00	USC Minots Panier	0 – 3	Saint Marcel FC
30 August	15:00	US Valbonne Sophia	0 – 0; 4 - 5 pen.	Esovictorine
30 August	15:00	T. Le Las	6 – 0	Saint Raphael FC
30 August	15:00	Olympique Suquetan Cannes	0 – 4	AS Roquebrune Cap
30 August	15:00	Six Fours Le Brusc	0 – 0; 7 - 6 pen.	US Sanaryenne

=== Martinique ===
Martinique
Date	Kick off	Home	Result	Away
5 September	15:00	CS Vauclinois	2 – 1	CS Belimois
5 September	15:00	US Marinoise	1 – 1; 5 - 4 pen.	Good Luck
5 September	15:00	La Gauloise de Trinité	2 – 0	Real Tartane
5 September	15:00	JS Eucalyptus	2 – 1	Silver Star
5 September	15:00	New Club	4 – 1	SC Lamentin
5 September	15:00	Club Péléen	2 – 3	Stade Spiritain
5 September	15:00	Eclair	3 – 2	Eveil
5 September	15:00	Excelsior	2 – 1	CO Dillons Sainte The
5 September	15:00	Samaritaine	1 – 0	CO Trenelle
5 September	15:00	Oceanic Club	1 – 2 a.e.t	Rapid Club
5 September	15:00	FC Ducos	2 – 1	Gri-Gri Pilotin FC
5 September	15:00	U. des Jeunes de Mon	3 – 2	Assaut
5 September	15:00	Anses Arlets FC	2 – 0	Foy.Educ.Pop. Monesi
5 September	15:00	Etoile	2 – 2; 6 - 7 pen.	U. des Jeunes de Red
5 September	15:00	US Riveraine	2 – 2; 5 - 4 pen.	US Boe
5 September	15:00	AS Morne des Esses	1 – 2	Santana Club Sainte Anne
5 September	15:00	Foy.Rur. Durivage	4 – 1	Etendard
5 September	15:00	New Star Ducos	2 – 0	Olympique du Marin

=== Mayotte ===
Mayotte
Date	Kick off	Home	Result	Away
4 April	19:00	Diables Noirs	0 – 1	FC Chiconi
4 April	19:00	AJ Kani-Kéli	6 – 2	Etoile Hapandzo
4 April	19:00	Tonnerre du Nord	2 – 2; 4 - 3 pen.	RC Barakani
4 April	19:00	Mahabou CS	2 – 1	Bandrélé Foot
4 April	19:00	AJ M'tsahara	0 – 3	Guinée Club
4 April	19:00	Ouragan Club	1 – 4	US Majikavo
4 April	19:00	Passamaïnty FC	4 – 1	AS Issouwala
4 April	19:00	ASCEE Nyambadao	5 – 4	AS Papillon d'Honneur
4 April	19:00	VSS Hagnoundrou	1 – 2	Pamandzi SC
4 April	19:00	Eclair du Sud	1 – 2	Koungou
4 April	19:00	Etincelles	3 – 1	RCES Poroani
4 April	19:00	ASJ Moinatrindri	0 – 1	Abeilles
4 April	19:00	Esperance Iloni	3 – 0	VCO
4 April	19:00	Enfants de Mayotte	6 – 5	FC Kani-Bé
4 April	19:00	US Loungou	2 – 1	Jumeaux
4 April	19:00	Papillon Bleu	1 – 0	Mliha Foot

=== New Caledonia ===
New Caledonia
Date	Kick off	Home	Result	Away
17 January	15:00	Azareu	6 – 6; 2 - 4 pen.	JS Vallée du Tir
17 January	15:00	AS Frégate	2 – 1	Unia
17 January	15:00	Havannah Goro	4 – 1	ES Sud
18 January	20:00	Nadoro	11 – 1	Olobath
18 January	20:00	AS Wet	4 – 1	US Wé
18 January	20:00	Val Fleuri	5 – 4	FC Belep
18 January	19:00	Etincelles	3 – 1	RCES Poroani
24 January	15:00	FC Koh	3 – 6	AS Poum
24 January	15:00	Grand Nord	1 – 14	CO Main Noire
25 January	20:00	AS Goa	5 – 2	US Gélima
31 January	15:00	ES Houaïlou	7 – 1	Ponérihouen

=== Nord-Pas de Calais ===
Nord-Pas de Calais
Date	Kick off	Home	Result	Away
30 August	15:00	AO Hermies	1 – 2	US Monchy Bois
30 August	15:00	FC Avion Com.	5 – 0	OSC Vitry
30 August	15:00	RC Divion	2 – 4	USC Tincques
30 August	15:00	FC Beaumont	2 – 1	RC Avesnes
30 August	15:00	FC Mericourt	8 – 2	SCF Achicourt
30 August	15:00	FC Bouvigny	2 – 0	ES Angres
30 August	15:00	US Boubers Conchy	1 – 4	ES Carency
30 August	15:00	US Riviere	6 – 0	US Izel-le-Equerchin
30 August	15:00	ES Eleu	12 – 0	ES Haillicourt
30 August	15:00	ES Val Sensee	2 – 1	AOSC Sallaumines
30 August	15:00	SC Fouquieres	1 – 3	US Croisilles
30 August	15:00	ES Sainte Catherine	5 – 0	SC Aubigny
30 August	15:00	ES Haisnes	7 – 1	US Lapugnoy
30 August	15:00	SC Artesien	1 – 3	AS Maroeuil
30 August	15:00	UAS Harnes	2 – 1	OS Annequin
30 August	15:00	SCP Saint Pierre	0 – 2	EC Mazingarbe
30 August	15:00	JF Mazingarbe	3 – 1	US Gonnehem
30 August	15:00	ISB La Roupie	3 – 1	FC Camblain
30 August	15:00	CS Lievin Diana	12 – 0	AS Berneville
30 August	15:00	AS Quiery la Motte	3 – 1 a.e.t	AJ Artois
30 August	15:00	CSAL Souchez	1 – 2	USO Lens
30 August	15:00	US Carvin Ruch	8 – 0	FC La Coutoure
30 August	15:00	AS Violaines	1 – 0	FC Lillers
30 August	15:00	Les Intrepides Norrent Fontes	1 – 0	ASFL Sains
30 August	15:00	SC Oeuf-en-Ternois	0 – 15	US Pas
30 August	15:00	US Avion Chts	1 – 0	Entente Verquin
30 August	15:00	FC Busnes	2 – 3	CS Pernes
30 August	15:00	US Givenchy	6 – 0	EC Estevelles
30 August	15:00	ES Douvrin	2 – 3	ES Anzin Saint Aubin
30 August	15:00	Beaumetz Wanquetin	7 – 0	AS Metz
30 August	15:00	FC Totrequenne	1 – 8	Olympique Vendin
30 August	15:00	FCE La Bassee	2 – 3	AAE Evin
30 August	15:00	Verquigneul FC	2 – 3 a.e.t	US Ham
30 August	15:00	Bethune Kennedy	5 – 0	AS Frevent
30 August	15:00	OC Cojeul	0 – 4	ES Saint Laurent
30 August	15:00	ES Vendin	1 – 2	AC Noyelles G
30 August	15:00	AFCLL Bethune	3 – 1	FC Richebourg
30 August	15:00	USA Arleux	3 – 3; 4 - 3 pen.	AG Grenay
30 August	15:00	CS Auchel Pogon	3 – 2	US Ablain
30 August	15:00	AS Brebieres	1 – 0	Bapaume Bertincourt
30 August	15:00	FC Servins	1 – 0'	US Hesdigneul
30 August	15:00	ASC Camblain	1 – 5	FC Hersin
30 August	15:00	AEP Verdrel	3 – 4	AS Pont A Vendin
30 August	15:00	AS Vendin	0 – 5	Olympique Lievin
30 August	15:00	FC Annay	4 – 1	US Maisnil
30 August	15:00	Carvin Dynamo F. 4	2 – 3 a.e.t	Olympique Henin
30 August	15:00	JF Guarbecque	2 – 0	US Lestrem
30 August	15:00	AS Cauchy	0 – 3	AS Barlin
30 August	15:00	RC Sains	0 – 0; 1 - 3 pen.	Olympique Burbure
30 August	15:00	ES Queant	0 – 3	CS Harbarcq
30 August	15:00	AJ Ruitz	2 – 5	FC Lens Hauts
30 August	15:00	ES Allouagne	1 – 3 a.e.t	AS Auchy-les-Mines
30 August	15:00	AS Saint Venant	6 – 2	AS Calonne-sur-Lys
30 August	15:00	US Houdain	2 – 0	Agny Ficheux Football
30 August	15:00	AS Robecq	5 – 7 a.e.t	US Beuvry
30 August	15:00	Bernard Bois	5 – 3	JS Achiet-le-Petit
30 August	15:00	ASPTT Arras	2 – 4 a.e.t	AS Courrieres
30 August	15:00	AFC Libercourt	0 – 4	Lens Rapide
30 August	15:00	Calais Balzac	2 – 1	US Sainte Marie Kerque
30 August	15:00	Calais FC	1 – 2 a.e.t	CA Vieille Eglise
30 August	15:00	Calais Catena	0 – 2	Fort Vert
30 August	15:00	SO Calais	3 – 4	ADF Ruminghem
30 August	15:00	FC Landrethun-le-Ardres	2 – 0	FC Campagne Guinness
30 August	15:00	FC Sangatte	0 – 2	Calais Beau Marais
30 August	15:00	CCI Calais	5 – 3 a.e.t	Calais Petit Pays
30 August	15:00	Calais Ponts Courghain	0 – 1	SC Coquelles
30 August	15:00	RC Bremes	1 – 4	ES Licques
30 August	15:00	Calais Var. Nord	0 – 3	AS Nortkerque
30 August	15:00	Calais Fort Nieulay	3 – 5	US Marais-de-Guinness
30 August	15:00	FC Boursin	2 – 3	US Bonningues Calais
30 August	15:00	FC Hemmes-de-Marck	6 – 0	Bonningues-le-Ardres FC
30 August	15:00	Entente Calais	3 – 1	Olympique Frethun
30 August	15:00	Olympique Offekerque	0 – 2	RC Ardres
30 August	15:00	SFCM Calais	1 – 3	AS Saint Tricat
30 August	15:00	US Pollincove	1 – 2	FC Resques
30 August	15:00	US Coyecques	2 – 0	ES Mametz
30 August	15:00	FC Herbelles	4 – 3	Dohem Avroult Clety
30 August	15:00	Longuenesse Mala	2 – 1	US Therouanne
30 August	15:00	FC Ecques Heuringhem	0 – 3	ES Roquetoire
30 August	15:00	US Alquines	0 – 6	AS Saint Martin Laert
30 August	15:00	US Vaudringhem	1 – 3 a.e.t	US Saint Quentin Blessy
30 August	15:00	FC Nordausques	3 – 2	ES Fauquembergues
30 August	15:00	FC Wavrans	3 – 2	FC Wardrecques
30 August	15:00	FC Thiembronne	1 – 6	CS Wattan
30 August	15:00	Surques Escoeuilles	4 – 3	AS Hallines
30 August	15:00	La Patriote Blendecques	0 – 3	ES Helfaut
30 August	15:00	JS Renescure	1 – 2 a.e.t	AS Tournehem
30 August	15:00	JS Racquinghem	3 – 1	Boisdinghem Zudausq
30 August	15:00	Saint Omer Essor	0 – 2	US Quiestede
30 August	15:00	AS Maresquel	5 – 1	US Attin
30 August	15:00	Neuville-sur-Montreuil	2 – 5	US Frencq
30 August	15:00	AS Conchil	0 – 9	ES Beaurainville
30 August	15:00	FC Tubersent	2 – 5	AS Bezinghem
30 August	15:00	Berck Genty	4 – 5 a.e.t	AS Rang-du-Fliers
30 August	15:00	US Brimeux	2 – 2; 4 - 3 pen.	AS Cucq
30 August	15:00	Wailly FC	3 – 4	AS Aubin Saint Vaast
30 August	15:00	U. Huny Saint Leu	0 – 1	US Verchocq
30 August	15:00	JS Loison Crequoise	1 – 2	FC Merlimont
30 August	15:00	AS Boisjean	1 – 2	AS Fillievres
30 August	15:00	ES Berck CF	0 – 2	AS Auchy-les-Hesdin
30 August	15:00	US Anvin	6 – 2	EHH Vallee-Ternoi
30 August	15:00	Olympique Henneville	1 – 2	FC Wierre-au-Bois
30 August	15:00	FR Preures	1 – 1; 2 - 4 pen.	US Equihen
30 August	15:00	Al. Camiers	1 – 3	JS Condette
30 August	15:00	FC Isques	2 – 2; 5 - 4 pen.	La Capelle-le-Boulogne
30 August	15:00	US Landrethun Nord	2 – 3	AP Le Portel
30 August	15:00	Boulogne Municipaux	0 – 6	A. Pont-de-Briques
30 August	15:00	Boulogne Continental	1 – 3	Olympique Saint Martin Boulogne
30 August	15:00	ESL Boulogne	1 – 3	ES Saint Leonard
30 August	15:00	US Samer	1 – 4	US Outreau
30 August	15:00	RC Lottinghem	3 – 5	ASL Vieil Moutier
30 August	15:00	US Le Portel	4 – 2	Samer FC
30 August	15:00	US Elinghen Ferques	0 – 2	RC Ostrohove
30 August	15:00	US Rety	1 – 0	AS Cremarest
30 August	15:00	FLC Longfosse	0 – 1	Hesdin L Abbe
30 August	15:00	Conteville Boulogne	1 – 2 a.e.t	US Colembert
30 August	15:00	ASC Seninghem	2 – 5	US Blaringhem
30 August	15:00	AS Campagne-le-Hesdin	1 – 2	AS Fruges
30 August	15:00	Vieil Hesdin	1 – 2	CO Wimille
30 August	15:00	US Prisches	1 – 4	US Glageon
30 August	15:00	Sars Poteries	2 – 5 a.e.t	FC Fontaine-au-Bois
30 August	15:00	Catillon-sur-Sambre	2 – 0	AS La Longueville
30 August	15:00	Olympique Wignehies	1 – 3	JS Avesnelles
30 August	15:00	FC Felleries	2 – 3	AFC Ferriere Petite
30 August	15:00	AS Trelon	2 – 3	IC Ferriere Grande
30 August	15:00	AS Limont Fontaine	0 – 2	FC Leval
30 August	15:00	US Cousoire	1 – 3	Rousies FC
30 August	15:00	FC Saint Remy-du-Nord	2 – 1	Olympique Maubeuge
30 August	15:00	Soire-le-Chateau	1 – 1; 3 - 4 pen.	OSC Assevent
30 August	15:00	Saint-Hilaire H	0 – 1	Olympique Maroilles
30 August	15:00	AFC Colleret	2 – 4	ES Boussois
30 August	15:00	AS Obies	3 – 2	AFC Elesmes
30 August	15:00	ES Berlaimont	2 – 0	AS Dompierre
30 August	15:00	US Englefontaine	1 – 10	SA Le Quesnoy
30 August	15:00	Villers Sire Nicole	5 – 2	US Gommegnies
30 August	15:00	Poix-du-Nord	2 – 0	AS Neuvilly
30 August	15:00	Olympique Maresches	4 – 3	US Bousies
30 August	15:00	AS Recquignies	3 – 0	SC Bachant
30 August	15:00	AS Artres	0 – 4	US Landrecies
30 August	15:00	US Briastre	0 – 2	US Bethencourt
30 August	15:00	Saint-Hilaire C	1 – 4 a.e.t	FC Iwuy
30 August	15:00	US Busigny	6 – 3	OM Seranvillers
30 August	15:00	FC Saint Python	3 – 2	SC Le Cateau
30 August	15:00	Walincourt Selvigny	3 – 1	SS Marcoing
30 August	15:00	U. Rumilly-Cis.	1 – 2	AS Masnieres
30 August	15:00	FC Neuville Saint Remy	4 – 2	Cambrai Portugais
30 August	15:00	AS Fontaine-Pire	1 – 0	AS Gouzeaucourt
30 August	15:00	Bertry Clary	4 – 5 a.e.t	FC Solesmes
30 August	15:00	FC Fontaine-Dame	2 – 1	US Les Rues Vignes
30 August	15:00	FC Graincourt	6 – 0	AS Bourlon
30 August	15:00	US Saint Aubert	1 – 3	FC Cambrai Saint Roch
30 August	15:00	OMCA Cambrai	5 – 0	FC Proville
30 August	15:00	Olympique Saint Olle	1 – 3	Paillencourt Estrun
30 August	15:00	Avesnes-Sec	1 – 7	FC Saulzoir
30 August	15:00	ESM Hamel	0 – 3	FC Ferin
30 August	15:00	US Villers Pol	1 – 7	FC Cantin
30 August	15:00	US Corbehem	0 – 3	US Pont Flers
30 August	15:00	Douai Lambres Chts	4 – 3	Olympique Marchiennes
30 August	15:00	Douai Sita Nord	1 – 8	AS Courchelettes
30 August	15:00	US Pecquencourt	1 – 2	Sin-les-Epis Foot
30 August	15:00	Somain Chts	4 – 2	Waziers A. Jeunesse
30 August	15:00	AS Coutiches	3 – 2	US Raimbeaucourt
30 August	15:00	US Auberchicourt	1 – 2	ES Bouchain
30 August	15:00	US Flines-Raches	1 – 2	AS Cuincy
30 August	15:00	FC Bruille	2 – 1	Dechy Sports
30 August	15:00	ACSJ Erchin	1 – 2	FC Roost Warendin
30 August	15:00	FC Pecquencourt	5 – 3	FC Masny
30 August	15:00	RC Lecluse	0 – 1	Lallaing Dynamo
30 August	15:00	ES Bouvignies	2 – 3 a.e.t	UF Anhiers
30 August	15:00	ES Helesmes	1 – 4 a.e.t	Montigny-Ostr
30 August	15:00	Olympique Landas	3 – 0	CO Raismes Sabatier
30 August	15:00	AS Thivencelles	7 – 0	Hergnies Bay.
30 August	15:00	Raismes 72	0 – 3	AFC Escautpont
30 August	15:00	Valenciennes Stwaast	7 – 2	Olympique Millonfosse
30 August	15:00	CO Trith Saint Leger	4 – 3	RC Roeulx
30 August	15:00	ES Crespin	3 – 4	Saint Saulve Foot
30 August	15:00	FC Saultain	1 – 0	ASBB Anzin
30 August	15:00	SC Lourches	5 – 2 a.e.t	JS Abscon
30 August	15:00	RC Preseau	0 – 4	Neuville OSC
30 August	15:00	US Aulnoy	2 – 2; 2 - 4 pen.	FC Quarouble
30 August	15:00	Olympique Raismes	0 – 1	FC Conde Macou
30 August	15:00	AS Wavrechain-sur-Denain	1 – 5	FC Lecelles Rosult
30 August	15:00	ES Noyelles-sur-Selle	2 – 1 a.e.t	JS Haveluy
30 August	15:00	FC Denain	4 – 3	US Haspres
30 August	15:00	AS Petite Foret	2 – 2; 5 - 4 pen.	SC Vicq
30 August	15:00	US Brillon	1 – 4	USM Beuvrages
30 August	15:00	EA Prouvy	3 – 1	US Erre Hornaing
30 August	15:00	LC Nivelle	0 – 8	FC Maing
30 August	15:00	US Hergnies	3 – 1	Valenciennes Summer
30 August	15:00	AS Thiant	1 – 3	ES Fenain
30 August	15:00	US Lieu Saint Amand	3 – 2	USCL Lewarde
30 August	15:00	FC La Chapelle	1 – 2	US Fretin
30 August	15:00	CS Bousbecque	2 – 0 a.e.t	FC Premesques
30 August	15:00	Olympique Hallennes	6 – 1	AS Avelin
30 August	15:00	FG Lille Bethune	4 – 2	Stade Lezennes
30 August	15:00	Lille Louviere Pelle	3 – 3; 5 - 3 pen.	AS Lille Vieux
30 August	15:00	Lomme Delivrance	2 – 3	USM Merville
30 August	15:00	AS Radinghem	3 – 1 a.e.t	FC Entente Merris
30 August	15:00	JSC Ostricourt	0 – 3	Roubaix Italiens
30 August	15:00	ES Ennequin	0 – 2	US Ronchin
30 August	15:00	AG Thumeries	4 – 1	AF Toufflers
30 August	15:00	OS Flers	5 – 1	FSM Quesnoy
30 August	15:00	US Tourcoing Chts	8 – 0	ES Frelinghien
30 August	15:00	Halluin F Espagnol	1 – 1; 2 - 4 pen.	EIC Tourcoing
30 August	15:00	FC Deulemont	1 – 5	US Fleurbaix
30 August	15:00	Entente Allennes	4 – 2 a.e.t	ES Steenbecque
30 August	15:00	Stade Ennevelin	1 – 4 a.e.t	FC Emmerin
30 August	15:00	JBTE Roubaix	2 – 1	FC Forest
30 August	15:00	ES Genech	4 – 1	Tourcoing Blanc Seau
30 August	15:00	JS Wavrin Don	1 – 0 a.e.t	FC Sailly
30 August	15:00	US Attiches	1 – 4	JS Lille Wazemmes
30 August	15:00	Bac Sports	0 – 7	CS Gondecourt
30 August	15:00	AS Salome	2 – 3	ES Boeschepe
30 August	15:00	ECF Champhin Pevele	2 – 5 a.e.t	FC Bauvin
30 August	15:00	US Estaires	3 – 0	US Lille Antillais
30 August	15:00	USC Lomme	0 – 3	US Saint Andre
30 August	15:00	US Phalempin	0 – 0; 4 - 5 pen.	AS Bersee
30 August	15:00	US Houplin	1 – 2	FC Wambrechies
30 August	15:00	FC Wahagnies	2 – 1	FC Le Doulieu
30 August	15:00	FC La Madeleine	0 – 1	FC Nieppe
30 August	15:00	Roubaix Vimaranense	2 – 1 a.e.t	FC Wattignies
30 August	15:00	FC Wattrelos	3 – 0	AS Hellemmes
30 August	15:00	AS Pont Nieppe	1 – 3	JS Steenwerck
30 August	15:00	FC Faches Thumesnil	0 – 1	AS Roubaix 3 Ponts
30 August	15:00	FC Bierne	3 – 1	US Bavinchove
30 August	15:00	US Leffrinckoucke	1 – 0	AAJ Uxem
30 August	15:00	AS Houtland	1 – 3 a.e.t	ES Wormhout
30 August	15:00	AS Noordpeene	4 – 2	AS Hazebrouck Chts
30 August	15:00	FC Rosendael	0 – 2	US Socx
30 August	15:00	US Warhem	1 – 3	SM Petite Synthe
30 August	15:00	U. Hondschoote	3 – 0	ASA Grand Synthe
30 August	15:00	SL Nieurlet	2 – 2; 7 - 6 pen.	AS Zegerscappel
30 August	15:00	Sud Dunkerque	2 – 1	US Coudekerque
30 August	15:00	FC Killem	0 – 1	CO Quaedypre
30 August	15:00	US Holque	1 – 0	OC Fort Mardyck
30 August	15:00	AS Rexpoede	1 – 8	USCC Saint Pol-sur-Mer

=== Réunion ===
Réunion
Date	Kick off	Home	Result	Away
2 May	17:30	A. Melanz Kartie	1 – 7	US Saint-Marie
2 May	20:00	US Bell. Cannot	1 – 0	ASC Ouest FC
2 May	20:00	FC Saint-Denis	12 – 2	JS Montagnarde
2 May	20:15	AJ Ligne Bamb	2 – 4	FC 3 Bassins
3 May	15:00	OSCA Leopards	3 – 1	AS Grand Fond
3 May	15:00	FC Riviere Galets	0 – 6	AS Chaudron
3 May	15:00	AS Colimacons	0 – 4	FC Avirons
3 May	15:00	FC Tampon	2 – 0	AS Saint Philipp
3 May	15:00	CO Ter. Saint	2 – 0	AS Saint-Rose
3 May	15:00	AFC La Halte	1 – 4	AS Marsouins
3 May	15:00	JS Vincendo	3 – 0	AS Red Star
3 May	16:00	ES Ent 2000	1 – 3	FC Saint Pauloise
3 May	16:00	SS Gauloise	10 – 0	US Desbassyns
3 May	16:00	ES Suzanne Bagat	5 – 3	GS De Berive
3 May	16:00	AS Bretagne	1 – 2	FC Bois Nefle
3 May	16:00	Union Saint Benedictin	3 – 1	JS Champbornnais
3 May	16:00	JS Piton Saint Louis	2 – 0	ASC Saint-Étienne
3 May	16:00	FC 17 Eme Km	7 – 1	ASC Monaco
3 May	16:00	AS Eperon	5 – 2	ES Entre 2
3 May	17:00	US Grand Bois	0 – 2	SS Excelsior
3 May	17:45	JS Cressonn.	1 – 0	JS Villele
3 May	17:45	SS Saint-Louisienne	7 – 0	Etoile Du Sud
3 May	17:45	SS Jeanne d'Arc	18 – 0	FC Hellbourg
3 May	17:45	FC SJ J. Petit	0 – 4	SS Rivière Sport
3 May	17:45	SS Capricorne	5 – 0	AJS Portoise
3 May	17:45	Moufia FC	0 – 4	JS Saint-Pierroise
3 May	17:45	U.S.S.T	2 – 0	Lig Paradi FC
3 May	17:45	AS Possession	5 – 0	Ch. Foucauld
3 May	20:00	AJS Portail	0 – 0; 5 – 3 pen.	Esperance Tan Rouge
6 May	20:00	SDEFA	7 – 0	AEFC Etang Saint Leu

=== Rhône-Alpes ===
Rhône-Alpes
Date	Kick off	Home	Result	Away
29 August	16:00	AS de Leyment	1 – 2	Balmes Nord I
29 August	16:00	AS Ascropol	3 – 0	Claix Football
29 August	15:00	Saint Jean Bournay	1 – 9	Saint Alban Sports
29 August	17:00	FC La Semine Chene	3 – 4	ES Thyez
29 August	19:00	AS Cessieu	1 – 2	Bellecour LY
29 August	20:00	Sud Annemasse	0 – 3	CO Bellegarde
29 August	20:00	Athletic Montmelian	2 – 4	E.S.T.
29 August	20:00	Bons-en-Chablais	1 – 6	US Mont Blanc
30 August	15:00	AS Sillingy	1 – 4 a.e.t	FC Amberieu
30 August	15:00	FC Cessy-Gex	3 – 1	US Izernore
30 August	15:00	AS Guereins	0 – 4	FCP L'Abresle
30 August	15:00	AS Saint Laurent	3 – 0	State Cormo Nizi
30 August	15:00	FC Dompierre	1 – 2	ES Foissiat
30 August	15:00	FC Nurieux	0 – 1	SR Saint-Étienne
30 August	15:00	CM Bressolles	2 – 1	US Veyziat Oyonnax
30 August	15:00	CA Saint Georges Rene	0 – 5	AS Chaveyriat
30 August	15:00	CS Montagnieu	1 – 3	FC Priay
30 August	15:00	US Jassans Riottie	0 – 0; 1 - 3 pen.	Taluy. Montag
30 August	15:00	FC Le Mas Rillier	1 – 7	US Corbelin
30 August	15:00	OS Pouilly-Pommier	1 – 2	CS Chevroux
30 August	15:00	FC Rive Droite	3 – 4	AS Bage Le Chatel
30 August	15:00	AS Vertrieu	2 – 3 a.e.t	CS Nivolas
30 August	15:00	BTF Montrevel	1 – 8	EVS Lamure-Azergues
30 August	15:00	BR Haut Bugey	1 – 2 a.e.t	ETS La Valliere
30 August	15:00	Saint Denis Ambu	3 – 2	Curtafon-Conf
30 August	15:00	Veyle-Vaulx-Jonc	3 – 3; 5 - 4 pen.	FC Lescheroux St Julien
30 August	15:00	AML Fleurie Villie	7 – 4	Dombes FC
30 August	15:00	Marson-Jaya-Berey	2 – 3	Olympique Belleroche
30 August	15:00	AS Limas	0 – 2	FC Dombes Bresse
30 August	15:00	Belle. Saint Jean D Ardennes	0 – 1	ESVS Thoissey
30 August	15:00	US Haute Bresse	3 – 2	US Vonnasienne
30 August	15:00	Certine-Tossi	1 – 2	PT De Vaulx Arbi
30 August	15:00	US Jujurieux	1 – 3	US Meyzieu
30 August	15:00	AS Arnassienne	3 – 4	AS Montmerle
30 August	15:00	Saint Cyr MT	0 – 1	US Nantua
30 August	15:00	ES Liergues	1 – 2	PV Grieges
30 August	15:00	ASCLA Bourg-Bourg	7 – 2	US Arbent Marchon
30 August	15:00	Grand Colombier	3 – 1	CA Yenne
30 August	15:00	AS Colomieu	2 – 0	ES Chanaz
30 August	15:00	AS Fareins	1 – 0	Olympique Sathonay
30 August	15:00	AS Hautecourt Roma	2 – 3 a.e.t	ATT Oyonnax
30 August	15:00	CS La Balme Sillingy	5 – 3 a.e.t	ES1 Meythet
30 August	15:00	CS Valromey	0 – 2	Saint-Ge-Fer-Cro
30 August	15:00	Olympique Virignin	1 – 4	US Tenay
30 August	15:00	E.C.B.F	1 – 0	FC Plaine De L Ain
30 August	15:00	FC Point Jour	1 – 8	FC De Luenaz
30 August	15:00	Bourg Sud	6 – 3	US Feillens
30 August	15:00	Odenas-Charen	3 – 1	US Replonges
30 August	15:00	ASM Mezeriat	5 – 0	Maillat Combe Val
30 August	15:00	Olympique Buyatin	1 – 5	FC Turcs Verpilliere
30 August	15:00	ETS Cormoranche	1 – 0 a.e.t	FC Franc Lyonnais
30 August	15:00	SC Porte De L Ain	5 – 1	Colomb. Saug.
30 August	15:00	AS Denice	0 – 2	Olympique de Saint Denis Les B
30 August	15:00	FC Saint Didier Forman	1 – 2	FC Manziat
30 August	15:00	CO Du Plateau	0 – 1	FC Bressans
30 August	15:00	Saint Anne Tram	3 – 2	AS Diemoz
30 August	15:00	US Albens	0 – 4	Ballon Cran Gevriier
30 August	15:00	Saint Pierre Faucigny	5 – 1	ASC Sallanches
30 August	15:00	ETS Viry	3 – 2 a.e.t	SS Allinges
30 August	15:00	FC Rochette	4 – 4; 2 - 4 pen.	US Modane
30 August	15:00	US Grignon	1 – 2 a.e.t	L'ASIEG
30 August	15:00	FC 1 Anthy Sport	1 – 6	ES Amancy
30 August	15:00	ES Fillinges	2 – 2; 1 - 3 pen.	Magland FC
30 August	15:00	Ascol Foot 38	2 – 3	US Chartreuse Guiers
30 August	15:00	CS Megeve	1 – 2	US Pringy
30 August	15:00	ES Seynod	0 – 1	SC Morzine
30 August	15:00	CF Estrablin	0 – 2	RC Mauves
30 August	15:00	AS Saint Joseph Riviere	3 – 4	Chy Port.Cx.Rge
30 August	15:00	Brison Saint Inn	6 – 0	Annecy Italiens
30 August	15:00	FC Combloux	2 – 5	US Annemasse
30 August	15:00	FC Thones	2 – 2; 3 - 4 pen.	CS Amphion Publier
30 August	15:00	Saint Michel FC	0 – 6	FC Crolles Bernin
30 August	15:00	FC Des Collines	1 – 4 a.e.t	Sporting Anneyron
30 August	15:00	FC Chanas	4 – 0	US Pont Eveque
30 August	15:00	FC Tignieu Jameyzieu	0 – 3	Saint Fons Portugais
30 August	15:00	Saint Quentinois Fal	4 – 4; 2 - 4 pen.	FC Vareze
30 August	15:00	AS Ver Sau	3 – 0	ES Saint Alban
30 August	15:00	Saint Clairois Espoir	0 – 1	Lyon.Cr.Ro. Foot
30 August	15:00	FC Croix Roussien	0 – 3	Saint Georges Espoir
30 August	15:00	Saint R. Jaliona	1 – 1; 7 - 6 pen.	Ev. De Lyon
30 August	15:00	ES Malissardoise	0 – 2	US Saint Romans
30 August	15:00	CS Four	1 – 2	FC Ooh La La
30 August	15:00	AS Vallon Pont D A	1 – 3 a.e.t	Athletic Lalevade D
30 August	15:00	AS La Bridoire	0 – 3 a.e.t	CS Virieu
30 August	15:00	AJ Beaurepaire	2 – 0	Ch.S.Isere
30 August	15:00	IN Lablachere	4 – 0	Saint Paul 3 Ch.
30 August	15:00	Sportif Montpezat Meyras	1 – 3	ASC Privadois
30 August	15:00	AMS Cheyssieu	1 – 6	US Loire
30 August	15:00	FC Liers	0 – 3	US Le Pont De Beauvais
30 August	15:00	SA Bonne	–	FC Pays D'Alby
30 August	15:00	ASS Estrela	1 – 5	F. Sud 74
30 August	15:00	AS Cours	1 – 3	FC Tarare
30 August	15:00	FC Lyon Gerland	1 – 4	AC Rive De Gier
30 August	15:00	FC Taninges	0 – 3	AS Ugine
30 August	15:00	FC des Aravis	0 – 0; 8 - 7 pen.	FC Ballaison
30 August	15:00	FC Marnaz	2 – 6	US Evian Lugrin
30 August	15:00	FJ Ambilly	1 – 3	US Argonay
30 August	15:00	US Collonges-sur-Saleve	2 – 4 a.e.t	CSA Poisy
30 August	15:00	FC Cranves Sales	3 – 2	Saint Felix
30 August	15:00	EVSP Sciez	0 – 1	US Chable Beaumont
30 August	15:00	Sporting Reignier	0 – 1	ES Cernex
30 August	15:00	Annecy Port.	1 – 4	US Challex
30 August	15:00	MIN Saint Pierre	2 – 7	AS Dardilly
30 August	15:00	FC Vallee Verte	–	US Margencel
30 August	15:00	AS Crossey	0 – 1	FC Nivolet
30 August	15:00	CA Bonneville	0 – 3	F. Sud Gessien
30 August	15:00	ALB Marcellaz	1 – 2	AS Parmelan Villaz
30 August	15:00	FC Vuache	–	FC Mieussy
30 August	15:00	US Champanges	0 – 1	FC Arenthon-Scientrier
30 August	15:00	Rhodia Club Péage de Roussillon	6 – 0	Corps Saint Fons
30 August	15:00	US Pers Jussy	0 – 1	La Biolle FC
30 August	15:00	ES Drumet Mouxy	0 – 1	ES Chilly
30 August	15:00	CS Ayze	1 – 1; 3 - 2 pen.	FC La FiliÈre
30 August	15:00	US Vetraz	5 – 4	AS Epagny
30 August	15:00	Vallee L'Arve	1 – 2	CS Veigy
30 August	15:00	FC Saint Cergues	3 – 2	CO Chavanod
30 August	15:00	FC Collonges	0 – 1	LA Tour
30 August	15:00	ES Lanfonnet	0 – 2	FC Saint Jeoire
30 August	15:00	FC Saint Martin-Sauvier	3 – 4 a.e.t	FC Saint Paul-en-Jarez
30 August	15:00	AS Novalaise	1 – 6	FC Saint Martin Portugal
30 August	15:00	ASJF Domene	6 – 2	US La Ravoire
30 August	15:00	SC Marin	0 – 1	Cluses FC
30 August	15:00	ASF Boubre	1 – 2	USC Aiguebelle
30 August	15:00	AS Chignin	1 – 1; 4 - 3 pen.	AS Fontaine
30 August	15:00	OCF Froges	5 – 4	FC Saint Julien
30 August	15:00	AS Barberaz	2 – 3 a.e.t	AS Cornier
30 August	15:00	Saint Victor Cessieu	3 – 1	L'Entente Val d'Hyeres
30 August	15:00	JS Saint Privat	0 – 3	Olympique Ruomsois
30 August	15:00	FO Seyssuel	0 – 3	G. Croix-Loret
30 August	15:00	AS Cancoise Villev	0 – 2	FC 3 Rivieres
30 August	15:00	FC Saint Martin Val	1 – 2	FC Aurec
30 August	15:00	US Batie Montgascon	0 – 8	La Motte Serv
30 August	15:00	US Monistrol	1 – 3	US Davezieux
30 August	15:00	JS Irigny	0 – 4	FC L Isle d'Abeau
30 August	15:00	Saint Didier-Aub	0 – 1	SC Melas
30 August	15:00	AS Cuines Val d'Arc	6 – 1	Sporting Marthod
30 August	15:00	US La Bathie	2 – 1 a.e.t	US Saint Remy
30 August	15:00	ES Vesseaux	1 – 4	CO Donzerois
30 August	15:00	Athletic Vallee Doux	1 – 4	AS Valensolles
30 August	15:00	FC Berg Auzon	3 – 1	ALEP Montboucher
30 August	15:00	FC Saint Quentin	2 – 2; 4 - 3 pen.	L'Entente Sarras Sports
30 August	15:00	JS Saint Paul	1 – 5	Olympique Club de Huert
30 August	15:00	Laissaud FC	2 – 4	AS Bozel Mount Jovet
30 August	15:00	US La Veore	1 – 1; 1 - 4 pen.	US Reventin
30 August	15:00	AS Crachier	1 – 4	Saint Genis Laval
30 August	15:00	US Dolomieu	2 – 1	AS de Monchat Lyon
30 August	15:00	AS Tullins	–	AS Villefontaine
30 August	15:00	FC Bauges	1 – 5	US Versoud Lancey
30 August	15:00	FC Chazelles	2 – 5	SC Lyon Ouest
30 August	15:00	FC Bourg Oisans	5 – 2	FC Champagnier
30 August	15:00	FC Terrres Froides	0 – 6	FCL Lyon
30 August	15:00	FC Villard Bonnot	1 – 0	AS Grac
30 August	15:00	AS Rhodaanienne	2 – 3 a.e.t	Mos FC
30 August	15:00	FC Andeolais	1 – 5	ES Boulieu les Annonay
30 August	15:00	AS Balbigny	1 – 5	Stade Amplepuis
30 August	15:00	FC Saint Martin Uriage	0 – 2	FC Sud Isere
30 August	15:00	Haute Brevenne Foot	3 – 0	AS Portugais Loire
30 August	15:00	Olympique de Monts	1 – 3	FC Savigneux Montbrison
30 August	15:00	AS Couzan	2 – 1 a.e.t	Stade Charlieu
30 August	15:00	Saint Romain Pope	1 – 2	Olympique de Coteau
30 August	15:00	US Ecotay Moingt	3 – 1	JUS Chambon-St
30 August	15:00	FC Meyrie	0 – 6	AS Feyzin Portugais
30 August	15:00	FC Rhone-Sud	3 – 0	FC Saint Joseph
30 August	15:00	L'Entente Foot Etangs	3 – 0	AS des Cheminot
30 August	15:00	AS Saint Galmier	3 – 5	EAS Noiretabl
30 August	15:00	CS Voreppe	4 – 1	CS Vaulx Milieu
30 August	15:00	Mistral FC de Grenoble	2 – 5	FC Turc de La Verpillier
30 August	15:00	AS Valondras	4 – 1 a.e.t	AS Grand Arc
30 August	15:00	SA Saint Agreve	1 – 0	AG Saint Sigolene
30 August	15:00	SS Char. Vig	1 – 2	Le Mont Grezieu
30 August	15:00	CS Faramans	1 – 3	FC Hauterive
30 August	15:00	ES Montrond	3 – 2 a.e.t	AS Mornant
30 August	15:00	Rives Sports	1 – 7	Hauts de Terrenoire
30 August	15:00	Frontonas 38	2 – 3	Grenoble Abbaye
30 August	15:00	Lauzes FC	1 – 7	Ozon Saint Symphorien
30 August	15:00	FC Veurey	2 – 3	CO Chandieu
30 August	15:00	SA Izieux	4 – 2	L'Entente Saint Genis Ollier
30 August	15:00	SP Vourey	1 – 3	FC Bg Peage
30 August	15:00	SS Satillieu	3 – 0	AS Riotord
30 August	15:00	FC Cheylard	1 – 2	Stade Interfoot Saint Just
30 August	15:00	Noyarey FC	Postponed	US Mours
30 August	15:00	FO Voiron	6 – 0	CS Vienne
30 August	15:00	FC Monestier	3 – 6	FC Deuz Rochers
30 August	15:00	US Vizille	3 – 2 a.e.t	Saint Hilaire Cote
30 August	15:00	Bouge Chambéry	5 – 4	FC Bilieu
30 August	15:00	JL Montregard	1 – 3	SG Malifau
30 August	15:00	Saint Paul de Mons	1 – 2	AS Roiffeux
30 August	15:00	Saint-Cyr Felines	0 – 3	Sporting Seauve
30 August	15:00	Lapeyrouse Mornay	3 – 5 a.e.t	Sevenne FC
30 August	15:00	Saint Paul Varoe	2 – 3	AS Pusignan
30 August	15:00	US Peyrinoise	3 – 0	FC Seyssins
30 August	15:00	Saint Denis-Coise	0 – 2	FC Solaize-Serez
30 August	15:00	US Bussieres	1 – 1; 5 - 6 pen.	Bourg Argenta
30 August	15:00	SL Val Azergues	0 – 5	Saint Priest-Jar
30 August	15:00	AS Manissieux	2 – 3 a.e.t	Chateauneuf Rhone
30 August	15:00	FC Ternay	0 – 1	USS Metare
30 August	15:00	FC Mirmande Saulce	0 – 4	US Saint Just-Saint Marcel
30 August	15:00	ES Chaponost	2 – 3 a.e.t	JS Cellieu
30 August	15:00	AS Brignais	1 – 0	FC Muzolais
30 August	15:00	Croix du Fray	0 – 2	FC Montelimar
30 August	15:00	Sourcieux FC	5 – 4	Olympique Club de Ondaine
30 August	15:00	Club Sportif Artistique Défense Nationale	2 – 3	AS Communay
30 August	15:00	AL Mirons	0 – 5	US Murette
30 August	15:00	AS S. Ferreol	0 – 2	Muroise Foot
30 August	15:00	US Fouillouse	4 – 5	FC Pontch-Saint Loup
30 August	15:00	US L Horme	1 – 1; 4 - 3 pen.	AS Saint Forgeux
30 August	15:00	ES Charly Foot	0 – 4	AS Jonzieux
30 August	15:00	AS Saint Just la Pendue	1 – 4	AS Larajasse
30 August	15:00	Saint Christopher-Mar	2 – 1	Prairies FC
30 August	15:00	OS Vallee Ouveze	4 – 0	CS Malataverne
30 August	15:00	Se. Amis du Foot	2 – 3	FC Val Lyonnais
30 August	15:00	Bords de Loire FC	0 – 3	FC Francheville
30 August	15:00	US Baix	2 – 0	FC Montagut
30 August	15:00	ES Saint Jean Bonne	1 – 1; 1 - 3 pen.	AS Soucieu
30 August	15:00	FC S. Heand	0 – 1	AS Grezieu La V.
30 August	15:00	AS Chessy	2 – 1	ES Sorbiers
30 August	15:00	ES Saint Priest	2 – 3 a.e.t	FC de Salaise-Sanne
30 August	15:00	Olympique de Montsegurien-Lauzon	1 – 2	AS du Pic
30 August	15:00	Saint Romain Sanne	2 – 3 a.e.t	Vaulx Ve. Port
30 August	15:00	FC Sch. Fonsala	4 – 1	GS de Chasse
30 August	15:00	US Villars	0 – 1	ASVEL Lyon-Villeurbanne
30 August	15:00	CO Quintenas	0 – 5	BG V. Homenet.
30 August	15:00	Berzeme FC	1 – 3	Sauzet FC
30 August	15:00	Bren FC	0 – 2	US Rochemaure
30 August	15:00	Bellegarde Sports	1 – 2	ASA Villeur
30 August	15:00	SC Sury le Comtal	4 – 3 a.e.t	FCL Cameroun
30 August	15:00	FC Saint Jean Alba	1 – 4	Eyrieux Embro
30 August	15:00	AS Ginissieux	1 – 2	AS Roussas G Gon
30 August	15:00	FC Alixan	0 – 5	L'Entente Chomerac
30 August	15:00	FC Batie Rolland	3 – 0	AS Alboussiere
30 August	15:00	FC Bourg Valence	0 – 1	CO Saint Fons
30 August	15:00	Crest Aouste	7 – 1	Colombes Saint Barthelemy
30 August	15:00	Lyon Maccabi FC	0 – 2	Fontaines 2
30 August	15:00	AS Portugais Vale	2 – 3 a.e.t	FC Valdaine
30 August	15:00	Olympique Monteleger	2 – 2; 4 - 2 pen.	Olympique Saint Mountain
30 August	15:00	ES Jonage	5 – 2	Saint Etienne Montreynau
30 August	15:00	JS Chambost Lestra	2 – 3	UOD Tassin
30 August	15:00	Saint Etienne Suc Terren	0 – 4	USO Vaugneray
30 August	15:00	Olympique Vaulx	5 – 1	AC Sante
30 August	15:00	FC Saint-Étienne	3 – 0	Andance And.
30 August	15:00	FC Lyon Menival	1 – 1; 3 - 1 pen.	US Montelier
30 August	15:00	Saint Alban Grosp.	1 – 4	US Ancone

== See also ==
- 2009–10 Coupe de France
- 2009–10 Coupe de France preliminary round
- 2009–10 Coupe de France 3rd through 4th rounds
- 2009–10 Coupe de France 5th through 6th rounds
- 2009–10 Ligue 1
- 2009–10 Ligue 2
- 2009–10 Championnat National
- 2009–10 Championnat de France Amateur
- 2009–10 Championnat de France amateur 2
