= List of French football transfers summer 2010 =

This is a list of French football transfers for the 2010 summer transfer window. The summer transfer window opened on 8 June 2010 and closed at midnight on 31 August 2010. Only moves involving Ligue 1 and Ligue 2 clubs are listed. Players without a club may join one at any time, either during or in between transfer windows.

== Transfers ==
Date	Name	Moving from	Moving to	Fee
10 May 2010	(France) Sylvain Marchal	(France) Lorient	(France) Saint-Étienne	Free
11 May 2010	(France) Marama Vahirua	(France) Lorient	(France) Nancy	Free
15 May 2010	(France) Mathias Autret	(France) Brest	(France) Lorient	Free
17 May 2010	(France) Anthony Losilla	(France) Paris	(France) Laval	Undisclosed
17 May 2010	(France) Vincent Créhin	(France) Plabennec	(France) Laval	Undisclosed
17 May 2010	(France) Gaëtan Belaud	(France) Tours	(France) Laval	Undisclosed
18 May 2010	(France) Anthony Weber	(France) Paris	(France) Reims	Free
20 May 2010	(France) Steven Paulle	(France) Cannes	(France) Dijon	Undisclosed
24 May 2010	(Algeria) Sofiane Khedairia	(France) Cassis Carnoux	(France) Le Mans	Undisclosed
25 May 2010	(France) Jérôme Martin	(France) Libourne-Saint-Seurin	(France) Dijon	Undisclosed
26 May 2010	(France) Johann Ramaré	(France) Boulogne	(France) Reims	Free
26 May 2010	(France) Romain Alessandrini	(France) Gueugnon	(France) Clermont	Free
26 May 2010	(France) Cédric Lubasa	(France) Fréjus	(France) Clermont	Free
26 May 2010	(France) Romain Hamouma	(France) Laval	(France) Caen	€1m
26 May 2010	(Cameroon) Vincent Aboubakar	(Cameroon) Cotonsport Garoua	(France) Valenciennes	Undisclosed
27 May 2010	(Ivory Coast) Brice Dja Djedje	(France) Paris Saint-Germain	(France) Évian	Free
27 May 2010	(Ivory Coast) Eric Tié Bi	(France) Lyon	(France) Évian	Free
27 May 2010	(France) David De Freitas	(France) Nantes	(France) Angers	Free
27 May 2010	(France) Mathieu Duhamel	(France) Créteil	(France) Troyes	Undisclosed
28 May 2010	(Poland) Grzegorz Krychowiak	(France) Bordeaux	(France) Reims	Loan
28 May 2010	(France) Christopher Glombard	(France) Bordeaux	(France) Reims	Loan
28 May 2010	(France) Olivier Blondel	(France) Toulouse	(France) Troyes	Free
28 May 2010	(France) Antoine Philippon	(France) Moulins	(France) Troyes	Free
28 May 2010	(France) Benjamin Morel	(France) Dives	(France) Caen	Free
31 May 2010	(Senegal) Frédéric Mendy	(Greece) Kavala	(France) Laval	Free
1 June 2010	(Chile) Marco Estrada	Universidad de Chile	(France) Montpellier	€1m
1 June 2010	(France) Jim Saïd	(France) Lille	(France) Valenciennes	Free
1 June 2010	(France) Nicolas Pallois	(France) Quevilly	(France) Valenciennes	Undisclosed
2 June 2010	(Argentina) Renato Civelli	(Argentina) San Lorenzo	(France) Nice	Undisclosed
3 June 2010	(France) Kévin Dupuis	(France) Toulouse	(France) Châteauroux	Free
3 June 2010	(France) Florian Jarjat	(France) Nantes	(France) Troyes	Free
4 June 2010	(France) Florent Ghisolfi	(France) Bastia	(France) Reims	Free
4 June 2010	(France) Eric Bauthéac	(France) Cannes	(France) Dijon	Free
4 June 2010	(France) Fabien Farnolle	(France) Bordeaux	(France) Clermont	Free
5 June 2010	(Sweden) Petter Hansson	(France) Rennes	(France) AS Monaco	Free
5 June 2010	(France) Yoann Court	(France) Lyon	(France) Sedan	Free
7 June 2010	(France) Julien Palmieri	(France) Paris	(France) Istres	Free
7 June 2010	(France) Joachim Ichane	(France) Laval	(France) Reims	Free
8 June 2010	(France) Guillaume Gauclin	(France) Guingamp	(France) Vannes	Free
8 June 2010	(France) Damien Perrinelle	(France) Boulogne	(France) Clermont	Free
8 June 2010	(France) Samir Malcuit	(France) Racing Paris	(France) Marseille	Free
9 June 2010	(France) Wissam Ben Yedder	(France) Alfortville	(France) Toulouse	Undisclosed
9 June 2010	(France) Julien Toudic	(France) Caen	(France) Reims	Loan
9 June 2010	(France) Anthony Scaramozzino	(France) Sedan	(France) Châteauroux	Free
9 June 2010	(Serbia) Branko Lazarević	(Serbia) OFK Beograd	(France) Caen	Free
9 June 2010	(France) Raphaël Caceres	(France) Luzenac	(France) Dijon	Free
9 June 2010	(France) Jonathan Ringayen	(France) Vendée Luçon	(France) Guingamp	Free
10 June 2010	(Burkina Faso) Gervais Sanou	(Burkina Faso) Centre Saint-Étienne	(France) Saint-Étienne	Free
10 June 2010	(Gabon) Selim Haroun Nze	(France) Boulogne-Billancourt	(France) Valenciennes	Free
10 June 2010	(France) Vincent Bessat	(France) Metz	(France) Boulogne	Free
10 June 2010	(France) Wilfried Moimbé	(France) Bordeaux	(France) Tours	Free
10 June 2010	(Czech Republic) Tomáš Mičola	(Czech Republic) Baník Ostrava	(France) Brest	Undisclosed
10 June 2010	(Czech Republic) Mario Lička	(Czech Republic) Baník Ostrava	(France) Brest	Undisclosed
11 June 2010	(Togo) Komlan Amewou	(Norway) Strømsgodset	(France) Nîmes	Undisclosed
11 June 2010	(France) Nicolas Bayod	(France) Nîmes	(France) Clermont	Undisclosed
11 June 2010	(Senegal) Khassimirou Diop	(France) Carquefou	(France) Nantes	Free
11 June 2010	(France) Issa Cissokho	(France) Carquefou	(France) Nantes	Free
11 June 2010	(France) Ghislain Gimbert	(France) Vannes	(France) Laval	Free
11 June 2010	(France) El Fardou Ben Nabouhane	(France) Le Havre	(France) Vannes	Loan
11 June 2010	(France) Sofiane Jennane	(France) Sedan	(France) Vannes	Free
11 June 2010	(France) Jean-Marc Le Rouzic	(France) Montagnarde	(France) Vannes	Undisclosed
11 June 2010	(France) David Gigliotti	(France) Le Havre	(France) Nîmes	Free
13 June 2010	(Romania) Daniel Niculae	(France) Auxerre	(France) AS Monaco	Free
14 June 2010	(France) Wesley Lautoa	(France) Compiègne	(France) Sedan	Free
14 June 2010	(France) Dorian Lévêque	(France) Boulogne	(France) Guingamp	Free
14 June 2010	(France) Arnaud Maire	(France) Strasbourg	(France) Ajaccio	Free
14 June 2010	(Algeria) Omar Benzerga	(France) Lille	(France) Nantes	Free
14 June 2010	(France) Jonathan Béhé	(France) Cassis Carnoux	(France) Le Mans	Free
15 June 2010	(France) Andy Delort	(France) Strasbourg	(France) Ajaccio	Free
15 June 2010	(France) Martial Robin	(France) Grenoble	(France) Istres	Free
15 June 2010	(France) Christophe Gaffory	(France) Bastia	(France) Vannes	Free
15 June 2010	(France) Grégory Malicki	(France) Dijon	(France) Angers	Free
15 June 2010	(France) Jean-Daniel Padovani	(France) Angers	(France) Dijon	Free
15 June 2010	(France) Julien François	(France) Tours	(France) Le Havre	Free
15 June 2010	(France) Jimmy Briand	(France) Rennes	(France) Lyon	€6m
16 June 2010	(France) Jeffrey Cuffaut	(France) Beauvais	(France) Le Mans	Undisclosed
17 June 2010	(France) Pierre-Noël Ettori	(France) AS Monaco	(France) Nîmes	Free
17 June 2010	(France) Alexandre Letellier	(France) Paris Saint-Germain	(France) Angers	Free
17 June 2010	(France) Cédric Fabien	(France) Brest	(France) Boulogne	Free
17 June 2010	(Mali) Fousseni Diawara	(France) Istres	(France) Ajaccio	Free
17 June 2010	(France) Anthony Lippini	(France) Troyes	(France) Ajaccio	Free
18 June 2010	(France) Dimitri Lesueur	(France) Gazélec Ajaccio	(France) Istres	Free
18 June 2010	(France) Nicolas Gillet	(France) Le Havre	(France) Angers	Free
18 June 2010	(Ivory Coast) Soumahoro Johnson	(France) Amiens	(France) Auxerre	Free
21 June 2010	(Uruguay) Adrián Gunino	(Argentina) Boca Juniors	(France) Toulouse	Loan
21 June 2010	(France) Francis Coquelin	(England) Arsenal	(France) Lorient	Loan
21 June 2010	(France) Pierre-Henry Lamy	(France) Louhans-Cuiseaux	(France) Angers	Free
21 June 2010	(Algeria) Abdelnasser Ouadah	(France) Châteauroux	(France) Istres	Free
21 June 2010	(France) Fabrice Begeorgi	(France) Istres	(France) Ajaccio	Free
22 June 2010	(France) Jean Armel Kana-Biyik	(France) Le Havre	(France) Rennes	€2m
22 June 2010	(France) Nicolas Florentin	(France) Caen	(France) Angers	Free
22 June 2010	(France) Jérôme Hiaumet	(France) Cannes	(France) Angers	Free
23 June 2010	(France) Ludovic Butelle	(France) Lille	(France) Nîmes	Loan
23 June 2010	(France) Nicolas Fauvergue	(France) Lille	(France) Sedan	Loan
23 June 2010	(France) Benjamin Graton	(France) Beauvais	(France) Laval	Free
23 June 2010	(France) Maxime Le Marchand	(France) Rennes	(France) Le Havre	Free
23 June 2010	(France) Bruno Cheyrou	(Cyprus) Anorthosis Famagusta	(France) Nantes	Free
23 June 2010	(France) Julien Cardy	(France) Metz	(France) Tours	Free
24 June 2010	(France) Marvin Esor	(France) Arles-Avignon	(France) Clermont	Free
25 June 2010	(Ivory Coast) Guie Gneki Abraham	(Hungary) Budapest Honvéd	(France) Tours	Undisclosed
25 June 2010	(France) Romain Reynaud	(France) Arles-Avignon	(France) Châteauroux	Free
25 June 2010	(France) Richard Socrier	(France) Brest	(France) Ajaccio	Free
26 June 2010	(Togo) Alaixys Romao	(France) Grenoble	(France) Lorient	Undisclosed
27 June 2010	(France) Anthony Le Tallec	(France) Le Mans	(France) Auxerre	€3m
27 June 2010	(Guinea-Bissau) Bocundji Cá	(France) Nancy	(France) Tours	Loan
28 June 2010	(France) Damien Marcq	(France) Boulogne	(France) Caen	€2m
28 June 2010	(France) Karim El Hany	(France) Gazélec Ajaccio	(France) Ajaccio	Free
28 June 2010	(Greece) Filipos Darlas	(Greece) Panathinaikos	(France) Brest	Free
28 June 2010	(France) Gaëtan Deneuve	(France) Châteauroux	(France) Brest	Free
28 June 2010	(France) Stéphane Tritz	(France) Rodez	(France) Tours	Free
28 June 2010	(South Korea) Song Jin-Hyung	(Australia) Newcastle United Jets	(France) Tours	Free
28 June 2010	(Ghana) Moussa Narry	(France) Auxerre	(France) Le Mans	Undisclosed
28 June 2010	(Senegal) Moussa Sow	(France) Rennes	(France) Lille	Free
28 June 2010	(France) Clévid Dikamona	(France) Caen	(France) Le Havre	Free
28 June 2010	(Spain) César Azpilicueta	(Spain) Osasuna	(France) Marseille	€7m
29 June 2010	(Serbia) Saša Cilinšek	(Serbia) FK Jagodina	(France) Évian	Free
29 June 2010	(France) Olivier Cassan	(France) Rodez	(France) Metz	Free
29 June 2010	(France) Johann Carrasso	(France) Montpellier	(France) Rennes	Undisclosed
29 June 2010	(Cameroon) Georges Mandjeck	(Germany) VfB Stuttgart	(France) Rennes	Undisclosed
29 June 2010	(Colombia) Víctor Montaño	(France) Montpellier	(France) Rennes	Undisclosed
29 June 2010	(Nigeria) Onyekachi Apam	(France) Nice	(France) Rennes	Undisclosed
30 June 2010	(France) Mathieu Bodmer	(France) Lyon	(France) Paris Saint-Germain	€2.5m
30 June 2010	(Cameroon) Charley Fomen	(France) Marseille	(France) Dijon	Loan
1 July 2010	(France) Chafik Najih	(France) Clermont	(France) Arles-Avignon	Free
1 July 2010	(France) David Sauget	(France) Grenoble	(France) Sochaux	Free
1 July 2010	(France) David Bouard	(France) Brest	(France) Vannes	Free
1 July 2010	(France) Yohann Thuram-Ulien	(France) AS Monaco	(France) Tours	Loan
1 July 2010	(France) Sébastien Chabbert	(Belgium) Charleroi	(France) AS Monaco	Free
2 July 2010	(France) Kévin Anin	(France) Le Havre	(France) Sochaux	Free
2 July 2010	(France) Guillaume Lacour	(France) Strasbourg	(France) Évian	Free
2 July 2010	(Algeria) Yacine Bezzaz	(France) Strasbourg	(France) Troyes	Free
3 July 2010	(France) Laurent Batlles	(France) Grenoble	(France) Saint-Étienne	Free
3 July 2010	(Republic of the Congo) Christopher Mfuyi	(Switzerland) Servette	(France) Valenciennes	Free
3 July 2010	(Slovenia) Denis Petrić	(France) Cassis Carnoux	(France) Istres	Free
4 July 2010	(France) Sébastien Cantini	(France) Sedan	(France) Vannes	Loan
5 July 2010	(France) David Fleurival	(France) Châteauroux	(France) Metz	Free
5 July 2010	(France) Damien Tixier	(Switzerland) Neuchâtel Xamax	(France) Nantes	Free
5 July 2010	(Gabon) Bruno Ecuele Manga	(France) Angers	(France) Lorient	Free
5 July 2010	(France) Sloan Privat	(France) Sochaux	(France) Clermont	Loan
6 July 2010	(France) Damien Dufour	(France) Auxerre	(France) Châteauroux	Free
6 July 2010	(France) Fatih Atık	(France) Tours	(France) Boulogne	Free
6 July 2010	(Turkey) Hasan Kabze	(Russia) Rubin Kazan	(France) Montpellier	Free
7 July 2010	(France) Yohan Mollo	(France) AS Monaco	(France) Caen	Loan
7 July 2010	(Gabon) Pierre-Emerick Aubameyang	(Italy) Milan	(France) AS Monaco	Loan
8 July 2010	(Romania) Claudiu Keserü	(France) Nantes	(France) Angers	Free
9 July 2010	(Morocco) Jamel Aït Ben Idir	(France) Le Havre	(France) Arles-Avignon	Free
9 July 2010	(France) Yves Deroff	(France) Guingamp	(France) Angers	Free
9 July 2010	(France) Jérémy Henin	(France) Le Havre	(France) Angers	Free
9 July 2010	(Ivory Coast) Abdoulaye Bamba	(Italy) Juventus	(France) Dijon	Free
10 July 2010	(Morocco) Youssef Adnane	(France) Angers	(France) Évian	Undisclosed
11 July 2010	(Brazil) Nenê	(France) AS Monaco	(France) Paris Saint-Germain	€5.5m
11 July 2010	(France) Yohan Rivière	(France) Istres	(France) Vannes	Undisclosed
12 July 2010	(France) Rémi Mulumba	(France) Amiens	(France) Lorient	Free
12 July 2010	(France) Steve Haguy	(France) Laval	(France) Nîmes	Free
12 July 2010	(France) Madimoussa Traoré	(France) Gazélec Ajaccio	(France) Nîmes	Free
12 July 2010	(Algeria) Hamer Bouazza	(England) Blackpool	(France) Arles-Avignon	Free
12 July 2010	(France) Rémy Cabella	(France) Montpellier	(France) Arles-Avignon	Loan
13 July 2010	(France) Grandi Ngoyi	(France) Paris Saint-Germain	(France) Brest	Loan
14 July 2010	(France) Vincent Planté	(France) Caen	(France) Arles-Avignon	Loan
14 July 2010	(Algeria) Nassim Akrour	(France) Grenoble	(France) Istres	Free
15 July 2010	(Morocco) Amin Erbati	(Morocco) Moghreb Tétouan	(France) Arles-Avignon	Free
16 July 2010	(France) Romain Peron	(France) Mulhouse	(France) Boulogne	Free
16 July 2010	(Serbia) Nemanja Pejčinović	(Serbia) Rad Belgrade	(France) Nice	Loan
16 July 2010	(United States) Carlos Bocanegra	(France) Rennes	(France) Saint-Étienne	€500k
16 July 2010	(Romania) Mihăiţă Pleşan	(Romania) Steaua București	(France) Arles-Avignon	Free
19 July 2010	(France) Stéphane Dalmat	(France) Sochaux	(France) Rennes	€1.5m
19 July 2010	(France) Fodie Traore	(France) Quevilly	(France) Brest	Free
19 July 2010	(France) Mody Traoré	(France) Valenciennes	(France) Le Havre	Loan
19 July 2010	(Brazil) Felipe Saad	(France) Guingamp	(France) Évian	Free
20 July 2010	(France) Ludovic Guerriero	(France) AC Ajaccio	(France) Metz	Free
20 July 2010	(France) Albin Ebondo	(France) Toulouse	(France) Saint-Étienne	Free
20 July 2010	(France) Jonathan Rivierez	(France) Lille	(France) Le Havre	Free
21 July 2010	(France) Fabien Laurenti	(France) Brest	(France) Arles-Avignon	Free
21 July 2010	(France) Vincent Pajot	(France) Rennes	(France) Boulogne	Loan
22 July 2010	(France) Romain Amalfitano	(France) Évian	(France) Stade Reims	Free
22 July 2010	(Serbia) Vujadin Savić	(Serbia) Red Star Belgrade	(France) Bordeaux	€1m
23 July 2010	(Brazil) Marcos	(France) Strasbourg	(France) Troyes	Undisclosed
23 July 2010	(Tunisia) Aymen Belaid	(Czech Republic) Sparta Prague	(France) Grenoble	Free
23 July 2010	(France) Yohann Lasimant	(France) Rennes	(France) Grenoble	Free
23 July 2010	(Angola) Titi Buengo	(France) Châteauroux	(France) Tours	Undisclosed
23 July 2010	(France) Yann Kermorgant	(England) Leicester City	(France) Arles-Avignon	Loan
26 July 2010	(France) Kevin Lejeune	(France) Auxerre	(France) Tours	Free
26 July 2010	(France) Pascal Johansen	(France) Metz	(France) Grenoble	Free
27 July 2010	(Ivory Coast) Serge Déblé	(England) Charlton Athletic	(France) Nantes	Free
28 July 2010	(Mali) Modibo Maïga	(France) Le Mans	(France) Sochaux	Undisclosed
28 July 2010	(France) Benjamin Genton	(France) Lorient	(France) Le Havre	Free
28 July 2010	(France) Fabien Barillon	(France) Marseille	(France) Istres	Free
29 July 2010	(France) Alexandre Cuvillier	(France) Boulogne	(France) Nancy	Loan
29 July 2010	(France) Yvan Erichot	(France) AS Monaco	(France) Clermont	Loan
28 July 2010	(France) Fabien Barillon	(France) Marseille	(France) Istres	Free
30 July 2010	(France) Lamine Kone	(France) Châteauroux	(France) Lorient	€1m
30 July 2010	(Ivory Coast) Franck Dja Djedje	(France) Strasbourg	(France) Arles-Avignon	Free
30 July 2010	(Spain) Álvaro Mejía Pérez	(Spain) Real Murcia	(France) Arles-Avignon	Free
30 July 2010	(Algeria) Kamel Ghilas	(England) Hull City	(France) Arles-Avignon	Loan
31 July 2010	(Brazil) Matheus Vivian	(France) Metz	(France) Nantes	Free
1 August 2010	(France) Jérôme Lafourcade	(France) Troyes	(France) Châteauroux	Free
2 August 2010	(France) Sébastien Puygrenier	(Russia) Zenit Saint Petersburg	(France) AS Monaco	Loan
2 August 2010	(France) Johan Martial	(France) Bastia	(France) Brest	Loan
2 August 2010	(France) Jean-Alain Fanchone	(France) Strasbourg	(France) Arles-Avignon	Loan
2 August 2010	(France) Richard Soumah	(France) Guingamp	(France) Brest	Undisclosed
4 August 2010	(France) Helton Dos Reis	(France) Saint-Étienne	(France) Grenoble	Undisclosed
4 August 2010	(France) Kévin Diaz	(France) AS Monaco	(France) Metz	Loan
6 August 2010	(Democratic Republic of the Congo) Dieumerci Mbokani	(Belgium) Standard Liège	(France) AS Monaco	€7m
6 August 2010	(Republic of the Congo) Prince Oniangue	(France) Rennes	(France) Tours	Free
6 August 2010	(Senegal) Tenema N'Diaye	(France) Nantes	(France) Metz	Free
7 August 2010	(Ghana) Mohammed Rabiu	(Italy) Udinese	(France) Évian	Loan
9 August 2010	(France) Distel Zola	(France) AS Monaco	(France) Laval	Loan
9 August 2010	(France) Camel Meriem	(Greece) Aris	(France) Arles-Avignon	Free
11 August 2010	(France) Loïc Loval	(Netherlands) Utrecht	(France) Vannes	Undisclosed
11 August 2010	(France) Loïc Abenzoar	(France) Lyon	(France) Arles-Avignon	Loan
12 August 2010	(Senegal) Jackson Mendy	(Germany) SC Freiburg	(France) Grenoble	Free
13 August 2010	(France) Anthony Modeste	(France) Nice	(France) Bordeaux	€3.5m
13 August 2010	(Guinea) Larsen Touré	(France) Lille	(France) Brest	Free
16 August 2010	(Greece) Angelos Charisteas	(Germany) 1. FC Nürnberg	(France) Arles-Avignon	Free
16 August 2010	(Greece) Angelos Basinas	(England) Portsmouth	(France) Arles-Avignon	Free
16 August 2010	(Mali) Mamadou Samassa	(France) Marseille	(France) Valenciennes	€800k
19 August 2010	(France) Loïc Rémy	(France) Nice	(France) Marseille	€15m
20 August 2010	(France) Stéphane Cassard	(France) Strasbourg	(France) Boulogne	Free
20 August 2010	(France) Lynel Kitambala	(France) Auxerre	(France) Lorient	Undisclosed
20 August 2010	(Gabon) Stéphane N'Guemo	(France) Beauvais	(France) Paris Saint-Germain	Undisclosed
21 August 2010	(Brazil) Diego Rigonato	(Hungary) Budapest Honvéd	(France) Tours	Undisclosed
21 August 2010	(France) André-Pierre Gignac	(France) Toulouse	(France) Marseille	€18m
23 August 2010	(France) Yoann Gourcuff	(France) Bordeaux	(France) Lyon	€22m
23 August 2010	(Senegal) Pape M'Bow	(France) Marseille	(France) Ajaccio	Loan
23 August 2010	(France) Cedric D'Ulivo	(France) Marseille	(France) Ajaccio	Loan
24 August 2010	(France) Paul Lasne	(France) Bordeaux	(France) Ajaccio	Free
24 August 2010	(France) Loris Arnaud	(France) Paris Saint-Germain	(France) Angers	Loan
24 August 2010	(France) Jacques Abardonado	(France) Valenciennes	(France) Grenoble	Free
25 August 2010	(France) Yannis Tafer	(France) Lyon	(France) Toulouse	Loan
25 August 2010	(Republic of the Congo) Lucien Aubey	(Turkey) Sivasspor	(France) Reims	Free
25 August 2010	(Niger) Ouwo Moussa Maazou	(Russia) CSKA Moscow	(France) Bordeaux	Loan
26 August 2010	(France) Chris Makiese	(Belgium) Zulte Waregem	(France) Laval	Free
26 August 2010	(France) Didier Digard	(England) Middlesbrough	(France) Nice	Loan
26 August 2010	(Zambia) Jonas Sakuwaha	(France) Lorient	(France) Le Havre	Loan
27 August 2010	(Tunisia) Fahid Ben Khalfallah	(France) Valenciennes	(France) Bordeaux	€3m
27 August 2010	(France) Mathieu Dossevi	(France) Le Mans	(France) Valenciennes	Undisclosed
29 August 2010	(France) Frédéric Nimani	(France) AS Monaco	(France) Nantes	Loan
30 August 2010	(France) Lhadji Badiane	(France) Rennes	(France) Dijon	Loan
30 August 2010	(France) Paul Baysse	(France) Sedan	(France) Brest	Undisclosed
30 August 2010	(France) Kévin Monnet-Paquet	(France) Lens	(France) Lorient	Loan
30 August 2010	(France) Romain Sartre	(France) Lens	(France) Tours	Free
30 August 2010	(France) Grégory Sertic	(France) Bordeaux	(France) Lens	Loan
30 August 2010	(France) Olivier Sorin	(Greece) PAOK	(France) Évian	Free
30 August 2010	(Serbia) Danijel Ljuboja	(France) Grenoble	(France) Nice	Undisclosed
31 August 2010	(Senegal) Pape Diakhaté	(Ukraine) Dynamo Kyiv	(France) Lyon	Loan
31 August 2010	(Ivory Coast) Yannick Sagbo	(France) AS Monaco	(France) Évian	Loan
31 August 2010	(France) Younousse Sankharé	(France) Paris Saint-Germain	(France) Dijon	Loan
31 August 2010	(France) Quentin Othon	(France) Strasbourg	(France) Châteauroux	Loan
31 August 2010	(France) Olivier Davidas	(France) Le Havre	(France) Nîmes	Free
31 August 2010	(Belgium) Gaëtan Englebert	(France) Tours	(France) Metz	Free
31 August 2010	(France) Jean-Jacques Mandrichi	(France) Nîmes	(France) Grenoble	Free
31 August 2010	(Republic of the Congo) Chris Malonga	(France) Nancy	(France) AS Monaco	€1m
31 August 2010	(France) Frédéric Sammaritano	(France) Vannes	(France) Auxerre	€500k
31 August 2010	(Mali) Abdou Traoré	(France) Bordeaux	(France) Nice	Loan
31 August 2010	(Ivory Coast) Serge Déblé	(England) Charlton Athletic	(France) Nantes	Loan
31 August 2010	(Czech Republic) David Rozehnal	(Germany) Hamburger SV	(France) Lille	Loan
31 August 2010	(Ivory Coast) Siaka Tiéné	(France) Valenciennes	(France) Paris Saint-Germain	€1m
31 August 2010	(Mali) Mahamane Traoré	(France) Nice	(France) Metz	Loan
31 August 2010	(Spain) Francisco Pavón	(Spain) Real Zaragoza	(France) Arles-Avignon	Free
31 August 2010	(Brazil) Jonathan	(Brazil) Goiás	(France) Arles-Avignon	Loan
31 August 2010	(Paraguay) Federico Santander	(Paraguay) Club Guaraní	(France) Toulouse	Loan

- ^1 Player who signs with club before 8 June officially joins his new club on 8 June 2010, while player who joined after 8 June joined his new club following his signature of the contract.
