= 2015 Guangzhou Evergrande Taobao F.C. season =

Guangzhou Evergrande Taobao 2015
- Chairman: Zhang Yong (to 30 June 2015); Ke Peng (from 1 July 2015)
- Manager: Fabio Cannavaro (to 4 June); Luiz Felipe Scolari (from 4 June)
- Stadium: Tianhe Stadium
- Super League: 1st
- FA Cup: 3rd round
- FA Super Cup: Runners-up
- AFC Champions League: Champions
- FIFA Club World Cup: 4th
- Top goalscorer: League: Ricardo Goulart (19); All: Ricardo Goulart (27)
- Highest home attendance: 51,025 vs Shandong Luneng; 25 October 2015 (Super League)
- Lowest home attendance: 35,641 vs Western Sydney Wanderers; 5 May 2015 (Champions League)
- Average home league attendance: league: 45,889 all: 45,809
Home colours	Away colours

The 2015 Guangzhou Evergrande Taobao season is the 62nd year in Guangzhou Evergrande's existence and is its 48th season in the Chinese football league, also its 26th season in the top flight. The club's name was changed from Guangzhou Evergrande F.C. to Guangzhou Evergrande Taobao F.C. before the 2015 season due to e-commerce company Alibaba Group purchasing a 50% stake in the club from the Evergrande Real Estate Group. Fabio Cannavaro was appointed as the new manager of the club after Marcello Lippi announced his retirement at the end of 2014 season. On 4 June 2015, Brazilian football manager Luiz Felipe Scolari was appointed as the new manager of club, signing a two-and-a-half-year deal.

== Players ==
As of 23 July 2015

=== First and reserve squad ===
Squad
No.	Pos.	Player	Super League		Champions League		FIFA Club World Cup	Reserve League	
No.	Pos.	Player	First half	Second half	First half	Second half	FIFA Club World Cup	First half	Second half
1	GK	(China) Dong Chunyu	●		●				
2	MF	(China) Liao Lisheng	●	●	●	●			
3	DF	(China) Mei Fang	●	●	●	●	●		
4	MF	(China) Zhang Jiaqi	●	●	●	●			
5	DF	(China) Zhang Linpeng	●	●	●	●	●		
6	DF	(China) Feng Xiaoting	●	●	●	●	●		
7	FW	(Brazil) Alan Carvalho	●		●		●		●
8	MF	(Brazil) Renê Júnior	●						●
9	FW	(Brazil) Elkeson	●	●	●	●	●		
10	MF	(China) Zheng Zhi	●	●	●	●	●		
11	MF	(Brazil) Ricardo Goulart	●	●	●	●	●		
12	MF	(China) Wang Shangyuan	●	●		●	●		
13	GK	(China) Fang Jingqi	●	●		●	●		
14	GK	(China) Liu Weiguo		●		●			
15	DF	(China) Yi Teng	●						
16	MF	(China) Huang Bowen	●	●	●	●	●		
17	MF	(China) Liu Jian	●	●	●	●	●		
18	FW	(China) Dong Xuesheng	●	●	●	●			
19	GK	(China) Zeng Cheng	●	●	●	●	●		
20	MF	(China) Yu Hanchao	●	●	●	●	●		
21	MF	(China) Zhao Xuri	●	●	●	●	●		
22	GK	(China) Li Shuai	●	●	●	●	●		
23	MF	(China) Yang Xin	●	●	●	●			
24	FW	(China) Liang Xueming	●	●		●			
25	DF	(China) Zou Zheng	●	●	●	●	●		
26	FW	(China) Wang Jingbin		●	●	●		●	
27	MF	(China) Zheng Long	●	●	●	●	●		
28	DF	(South Korea) Kim Young-gwon	●	●	●	●	●		
29	FW	(China) Gao Lin	●	●	●	●	●		
30	DF	(China) Hu Bao			●			●	●
31	MF	(China) Luo Jiacheng			●			●	●
32	MF	(China) Ju Feng			●			●	●
33	DF	(China) Rong Hao	●	●	●	●	●		
34	MF	(China) Wang Junhui	●	●	●	●			
35	DF	(China) Li Xuepeng	●	●	●	●	●		
36	DF	(China) Liu Hao						●	●
37	DF	(China) Wu Yuduo						●	●
38	MF	(China) Shen Qi'an						●	
39	DF	(China) Zhu Junhui						●	
40	FW	(China) Hu Yangyang						●	●
41	DF	(China) Gong Liangxuan							●
42	GK	(China) Zhao Tianci						●	●
43	DF	(China) Wen Haojun						●	●
45	MF	(China) Li Geng						●	●
46	DF	(China) Yang Zhaohui						●	
47	GK	(China) Liu Shibo						●	●
48	MF	(Brazil) Paulinho		●		●	●		
49	MF	(China) Wang Rui				●			●
50	MF	(China) Li Zhongyi						●	●
51	MF	(China) Xu Li'ao						●	●
52	DF	(China) Guan Haojin						●	●
53	DF	(China) Guo Tao						●	
54	FW	(China) Gan Tiancheng						●	●
55	MF	(China) Lin Zhikeng						●	
56	FW	(Brazil) Robinho		●			●		
57	MF	(China) Chen Zepeng							●
	MF	(China) Feng Renliang			●				

=== On loan ===
Note: Flags indicate national team as defined under FIFA eligibility rules; some limited exceptions apply. Players may hold more than one non-FIFA nationality.

No.	Pos.	Nation	Player
15	DF	CHN	Yi Teng (at Hangzhou Greentown from 22 June 2015 until 31 December 2015)
—	DF	CHN	Hu Bowen (at Qingdao Hainiu until 31 December 2015)
—	DF	CHN	Zhang Hongnan (at Shenzhen F.C. until 31 December 2015)
—	MF	CHN	Feng Renliang (at Guizhou Renhe until 31 December 2015)
—	MF	CHN	Peng Xinli (at Chongqing Lifan until 31 December 2015)

No.	Pos.	Nation	Player
—	MF	CHN	Li Yuanyi (at Leixões from 16 July 2015 until 31 December 2015)
—	MF	ITA	Alessandro Diamanti (at Watford from 17 August 2015 until 30 June 2016)
—	FW	CHN	Shewket Yalqun (at Xinjiang Tianshan Leopard until 31 December 2015)
—	FW	CHN	Yang Chaosheng (at Liaoning F.C. until 31 December 2015)

== Technical staff ==
Position	Name
Head coach	(Brazil) Luiz Felipe Scolari (from 4 June 2015)
Assistant coaches	(Brazil) Flávio Murtosa (from 4 June 2015) (Brazil) Ivo Wortmann (from 4 June 2015) (China) Hao Wei (from 11 August 2015)
Goalkeeping coach	(Brazil) Carlos Pracidelli (from 4 June 2015)
Fitness coach	(Brazil) Darlan Schneider (from 4 June 2015) (Brazil) Rudy Pracidelli (from 1 July 2015)
Reserve team coach	(China) Hao Wei (from 11 August 2015)
Reserve team assistant coach	(China) Pang Li (China) Chang Weiwei (from 11 August 2015)
Reserve team goalkeeping coach	(China) Chen Gang
Academy director / U-17 team coach	(Germany) Marco Pezzaiuoli
Team doctor / Physiotherapist	(Brazil) Feliciano Fontoura (from 4 June 2015)
Team doctor	(China) Wang Shucheng (Japan) Kyoshi O (Brazil) Gustavo Emilio Arcos Campos (from 1 July 2015)
Technical director	(Italy) Marcello Lippi (to 28 February 2015)
Head coach	(Italy) Fabio Cannavaro (to 4 June 2015)
Assistant coaches	(Italy) Narciso Pezzotti (to 4 June 2015) (Italy) Massimiliano Maddaloni (to 4 June 2015) (China) Li Tie (to 26 June 2015)
Goalkeeping coach	(Italy) Michelangelo Rampulla (to 4 June 2015)
Fitness coach	(Italy) Claudio Gaudino (to 4 June 2015) (Spain) Jordi García (to 4 June 2015)
Reserve team coach	(Italy) Fabrizio Del Rosso (to 4 June 2015)
Medical adviser	(Italy) Enrico Castellacci (to 4 June 2015)
Team doctor / Physiotherapist	(Italy) Silvano Cotti (to 4 June 2015)
Scout	(Italy) Andrea Innocenti (to 4 June 2015)

== Transfers ==
=== In ===
==== Winter ====
Squad number	Position	Player	Age	Moving from	Type	Transfer fee	Date	Source
25	DF	(China) Zou Zheng	26	(China) Qingdao Jonoon	Transfer	¥20 million	24 December 2014	
4	MF	(China) Zhang Jiaqi	23	(China) Dalian Aerbin	Transfer	¥20 million	24 December 2014	
	DF	(China) Zhao Peng	31	(China) Changchun Yatai	Loan returned		31 December 2014	
	MF	(China) Feng Renliang	26	(China) Changchun Yatai	Loan returned		31 December 2014	
	DF	(China) Li Jianbin	25	(China) Henan Jianye	Loan returned		31 December 2014	
	DF	(China) Hu Bowen	20	(China) Hangzhou Greentown	Loan returned		31 December 2014	
	FW	(China) Yang Chaosheng	21	(China) Liaoning F.C.	Loan returned		31 December 2014	
15	DF	(China) Yi Teng	24	(China) Liaoning F.C.	Loan returned		31 December 2014	
	DF	(China) Gong Liangxuan	21	(China) Chengdu Tiancheng	Loan returned		31 December 2014	
	DF	(China) Tu Dongxu	23	(China) Guangdong Sunray Cave	Loan returned		31 December 2014	
	FW	(China) Ye Weichao	25	(China) Guangdong Sunray Cave	Loan returned		31 December 2014	
	FW	(China) Shewket Yalqun	21	(China) Qingdao Hainiu	Loan returned		31 December 2014	
	MF	(China) Wang Rui	21	(China) Qingdao Hainiu	Loan returned		31 December 2014	
	DF	(China) Zhang Hongnan	23	(China) Qingdao Hainiu	Loan returned		31 December 2014	
	FW	(China) Ni Bo	25	(China) Shenyang Zhongze	Loan returned		31 December 2014	
	DF	(China) Li Weixin	21	(China) Meixian Kejia	Loan returned		31 December 2014	
	MF	(China) Gao Zhilin	23	(China) Meizhou Kejia	Loan returned		31 December 2014	
	MF	(China) Peng Xinli	23	(China) Meizhou Kejia	Loan returned		31 December 2014	
	MF	(China) Zhang Xingbo	20	(China) Taiyuan Zhongyou Jiayi	Loan returned		31 December 2014	
11	MF	(Brazil) Ricardo Goulart	23	(Brazil) Cruzeiro	Transfer	€15 million	13 January 2015	
7	FW	(Brazil) Alan Carvalho	25	(Austria) Red Bull Salzburg	Transfer	€11.1 million	16 January 2015	
12	MF	(China) Wang Shangyuan	21	(Belgium) Club Brugge	Transfer	Undisclosed	27 February 2015	

==== Summer ====
Squad number	Position	Player	Age	Moving from	Type	Transfer fee	Date	Source
48	MF	(Brazil) Paulinho	26	(England) Tottenham Hotspur	Transfer	€14 million	29 June 2015	
	MF	(Italy) Alessandro Diamanti	32	(Italy) Fiorentina	Loan returned		30 June 2015	
	FW	(Italy) Alberto Gilardino	32	(Italy) Fiorentina	Loan returned		30 June 2015	
14	GK	(China) Liu Weiguo	23	(China) Dalian Aerbin	Transfer	¥15 million	10 July 2015	
56	FW	(Brazil) Robinho	31	Free Agent	Transfer	Free	16 July 2015	
	MF	(China) Li Yuanyi	21	(Portugal) Boavista	Transfer	€2 million	16 July 2015	

=== Out ===
==== Winter ====
Squad number	Position	Player	Age	Moving to	Type	Transfer fee	Date	Source
59	DF	(China) Li Jianbin	25	(China) Shanghai Greenland Shenhua	Transfer	Undisclosed	4 December 2014	
	MF	(China) Zhang Xingbo	20	(China) Nei Mongol Zhongyou	Transfer	Undisclosed	1 January 2015	
	DF	(China) Zhang Hongnan	23	(China) Shenzhen F.C.	Loan	Undisclosed	1 January 2015	
	FW	(China) Shewket Yalqun	21	(China) Xinjiang Tianshan Leopard	Loan	Undisclosed	1 January 2015	
	DF	(China) Li Weixin	21	(China) Meixian Kejia	Transfer	Undisclosed	1 January 2015	
	MF	(China) Gao Zhilin	23	(China) Meizhou Kejia	Transfer	Undisclosed	1 January 2015	
	DF	(China) Tu Dongxu	23	(China) Meizhou Kejia	Transfer	Undisclosed	1 January 2015	
32	DF	(China) Sun Xiang	32	(China) Shanghai SIPG	Transfer	Free transfer	5 January 2015	
23	MF	(Italy) Alessandro Diamanti	31	(Italy) Fiorentina	Loan	€2 million	10 January 2015	
38	FW	(Italy) Alberto Gilardino	32	(Italy) Fiorentina	Loan	Undisclosed	26 January 2015	
34	MF	(China) Hu Weiwei	21	(China) Qingdao Jonoon	Transfer	Undisclosed	11 February 2015	
21	MF	(China) Peng Xinli	23	(China) Chongqing Lifan	Loan	Undisclosed	11 February 2015	
4	DF	(China) Zhao Peng	31	(China) Qingdao Jonoon	Transfer	Free transfer	14 February 2015	
40	DF	(China) Hu Bowen	21	(China) Qingdao Hainiu	Loan	Undisclosed	16 February 2015	
7	MF	(China) Feng Junyan	31		Retired		18 February 2015	
30	FW	(China) Yang Chaosheng	21	(China) Liaoning F.C.	Loan	Undisclosed	27 February 2015	
14	MF	(China) Feng Renliang	26	(China) Guizhou Renhe	Loan	Undisclosed	28 February 2015	

==== Summer ====
Squad number	Position	Player	Age	Moving to	Type	Transfer fee	Date	Source
15	DF	(China) Yi Teng	25	(China) Hangzhou Greentown	Loan	Undisclosed	22 June 2015	
	MF	(China) Li Yuanyi	21	(Portugal) Leixões	Loan	Undisclosed	16 July 2015	
	MF	(Italy) Alessandro Diamanti	32	(England) Watford	Loan	Undisclosed	17 August 2015	
	FW	(Italy) Alberto Gilardino	33	(Italy) Palermo	Transfer	Undisclosed	27 August 2015	

== Pre-season and friendlies ==
=== Training matches ===
Date	Opponents	H / A	Result	Scorers
2015-01-11	(China) Nanjing Qianbao	H	2–0	Liu Jian, Dong Xuesheng
2015-01-17	(China) Tianjin Songjiang	H	2–3	Cao Xiaodong (o.g.), Elkeson
2015-02-07	(China) Hangzhou Greentown	H	1–1	Elkeson (pen.)
2015-12-08	(China) Guangdong	A	3–1	Goulart, Elkeson, Zheng Long

=== 2015 Casino Marbella Cup ===
24 January 2015	Guangzhou Evergrande Taobao (China)	0–2	(South Korea) Suwon Samsung Bluewings	Los Barrios, Spain
16:00 UTC+1			Ha Tae-goon 71', 85'	Stadium: Estadio Los Barrios

27 January 2015	Guangzhou Evergrande Taobao (China)	2–1	(Brazil) Atlético Paranaense	San Fernando, Spain
16:00 UTC+1	Dong Xuesheng 6'; Elkeson 23'		Cléo 84'	Stadium: Estadio Bahía Sur; Referee: Juan Francisco Caravaca (Spain)

29 January 2015	Guangzhou Evergrande Taobao (China)	4–1	(Angola) S.L. Benfica (Luanda)	Marbella, Spain
16:00 UTC+1	Alan 3', 42'; Huang Bowen 16'; Feng Renliang 79'		63'	Stadium: Estadio Municipal de Marbella

=== FC Bayern München China Tour ===
23 July 2015	Guangzhou Evergrande Taobao (China)	0–0 (5–4 p)	(Germany) Bayern München	Guangzhou
19:35 UTC+8			Rafinha (yellow card) 39'	Stadium: Tianhe Stadium; Referee: Wang Di; Assistant referees: Wang Dexin, Ma Ji; Fourth official: Zhang Lei
	Penalties
	Paulinho (penalty scored); Kim Young-gwon (penalty scored); Yu Hanchao (penalty scored); Zhao Xuri (penalty scored); Feng Xiaoting (penalty scored)		(penalty missed) Müller; (penalty scored) Alonso; (penalty scored) Boateng; (penalty scored) Douglas Costa; (penalty scored) Thiago

== Competitions ==
=== Chinese Super League ===
==== Table ====
Pos	Team	Pld	W	D	L	GF	GA	GD	Pts	Qualification or relegation
1	Guangzhou Evergrande Taobao (C)	30	19	10	1	71	28	+43	67	Qualification to Champions League group stage
2	Shanghai SIPG	30	19	8	3	63	35	+28	65	Qualification to Champions League play-off round
3	Shandong Luneng Taishan	30	18	5	7	66	41	+25	59	Qualification to Champions League preliminary round 2
4	Beijing Guoan	30	16	8	6	46	26	+20	56	
5	Henan Jianye	30	12	10	8	35	30	+5	46	

Source: sports.sina.com (in Chinese)
Rules for classification: 1) points; 2) head-to-head points; 3) head-to-head goals scored; 4) head-to-head away goals scored; 5)goal difference; 6) number of goals scored; 7) disciplinary points (1 point for each yellow card, 3 points for each red card). Head-to-Head: Only used at the end of the season when two or more teams need the head-to-head rules to break a tie.
(C) Champions

==== Results summary ====
Overall								Home						Away					
Pld	W	D	L	GF	GA	GD	Pts	W	D	L	GF	GA	GD	W	D	L	GF	GA	GD
30	19	10	1	71	28	+43	67	6	9	0	39	17	+22	13	1	1	32	11	+21

Last updated: 31 October 2015.
Source: Competitive Matches

==== Results by round ====
Round	1	2	3	4	5	6	7	8	9	10	11	12	13	14	15	16	17	18	19	20	21	22	23	24	25	26	27	28	29	30
Ground	H	A	H	A	H	H	H	A	H	H	H	H	H	A	H	A	H	A	H	A	A	A	H	A	A	A	A	A	H	A
Result	W	W	D	L	W	W	D	W	W	D	D	W	D	W	D	D	W	W	D	W	W	W	D	W	W	W	W	W	D	W
Position	5	4	4	7	3	2	2	2	2	2	3	2	2	1	1	3	3	3	3	2	2	1	2	2	1	1	1	1	1	1

Updated to match(es) played on 31 October 2015. Source: Chinese Super League Table (in Chinese)
A = Away; H = Home; W = Win; D = Draw; L = Loss

==== Matches ====
Win Draw Loss

9 March 2015 Round 1	Guangzhou Evergrande Taobao	2 - 1	Shijiazhuang Ever Bright	Guangzhou
20:00 UTC+8	Goulart 45+3'; Yu Hanchao 90+4'		Rondón 19'; Iliev (yellow card) 20'; Mao Jianqing (yellow card) 49'; Rondón (yellow card) 58'	Stadium: Tianhe Stadium; Attendance: 45,421; Referee: Ma Ning; Assistant referees: Zhang Qiangjing, Zhan Wei; Fourth official: Zhang Lei

14 March 2015 Round 2	Chongqing Lifan	1 - 2	Guangzhou Evergrande Taobao	Chongqing
15:35 UTC+8	Sun Jihai (yellow card) 7'; Xu Xiaobo (yellow card) 61'; Zhang Chiming 63'; Zhang Chiming (yellow card) 63'; Gigliotti (yellow card) 67'; Liu Weidong (yellow card) 68'; Guto (yellow card) 85'		Gao Lin 17'; Renê Júnior (yellow card) 37'; Goulart 41'	Stadium: Chongqing Olympic Sports Center; Attendance: 48,530; Referee: Zhou Gang; Assistant referees: Huo Weiming, Yu Yue; Fourth official: Li Jun

22 March 2015 Round 3	Guangzhou Evergrande Taobao	1 - 1	Changchun Yatai	Guangzhou
20:00 UTC+8	Elkeson (yellow card) 16'; Renê Júnior (yellow card) 27'; Zhao Xuri (yellow card) 66'; Ismailov 69' (o.g.)		Li Guang (yellow card) 27'; Maâzou 29'; Jiang Zhe (yellow card) 56'; Du Zhenyu (yellow card) 62'; Li Guang (yellow card) 76' (yellow-red card); Maâzou (yellow card) 90+4'	Stadium: Tianhe Stadium; Attendance: 46,431; Referee: Tan Hai; Assistant referees: Mu Yuxin, Ma Ji; Fourth official: Ma Li

3 April 2015 Round 4	Henan Jianye	2 - 1	Guangzhou Evergrande Taobao	Zhengzhou
19:45 UTC+8	Xiao Zhi 8'; Lü Jianjun (yellow card) 45'; Gomes (yellow card) 45+2'; Bi Jinhao 71'; Gu Cao (yellow card) 88'		Huang Bowen (yellow card) 30'; Wang Shangyuan (yellow card) 45+2'; Kim Young-gwon (yellow card) 45+2'; Renê Júnior (yellow card) 45+4'; Zhang Linpeng 64'; Elkeson (penalty missed) 90+1' (pen.); Feng Xiaoting (yellow card) After match	Stadium: Hanghai Stadium; Attendance: 21,662; Referee: Huang Yejun; Assistant referees: Zhang Yongjun, Xu Jun; Fourth official: He Xiaohu

12 April 2015 Round 5	Guangzhou Evergrande Taobao	6 - 1	Liaoning Panjin Whowin	Guangzhou
20:00 UTC+8	Gao Lin 9'; Zhang Linpeng 25'; Elkeson 48'; Goulart 60'; Goulart (yellow card) 68'; Elkeson 86'; Gao Lin 90+2'		Zhang Ye (yellow card) 18'; Chamanga 34' (pen.)	Stadium: Tianhe Stadium; Attendance: 45,328; Referee: Fu Ming; Assistant referees: Xu Peng, Tong Yong; Fourth official: Guan Xing

17 April 2015 Round 6	Guangzhou Evergrande Taobao	1 - 0	Hangzhou Greentown	Guangzhou
20:00 UTC+8	Elkeson 14'; Zhao Xuri (yellow card) 63'; Mei Fang (yellow card) 76'; Goulart (yellow card) 80'			Stadium: Tianhe Stadium; Attendance: 46,321; Referee: Zhang Lei; Assistant referees: Huo Weiming, Wu Lei; Fourth official: Wang Zhe

26 April 2015 Round 7	Guangzhou Evergrande Taobao	3 - 3	Jiangsu Guoxin-Sainty	Guangzhou
20:00 UTC+8	Elkeson 5'; Gao Lin 67'; Li Xuepeng (yellow card) 72'; Yu Hanchao (yellow card) 90+2'; Zhang Linpeng (yellow card) 90+2'; Goulart 90+4'		Sammir (yellow card) 25'; Escudero 33'; Wu Xi 44'; Ottesen (yellow card) 63'; Escudero (yellow card) 76'; Kjartansson 83'; Zhang Sipeng (yellow card) 88'	Stadium: Tianhe Stadium; Attendance: 45,831; Referee: Fan Qi; Assistant referees: Wang Dexin, Xu Peng; Fourth official: Xu Fuxin

1 May 2015 Round 8	Shanghai Greenland Shenhua	0 - 3	Guangzhou Evergrande Taobao	Shanghai
19:45 UTC+8	Bai Jiajun (yellow card) 83'		Gao Lin 4'; Goulart 11'; Huang Bowen (yellow card) 16'; Zheng Zhi 25'; Li Xuepeng (yellow card) 41'; Goulart (yellow card) 72'	Stadium: Hongkou Football Stadium; Attendance: 25,751; Referee: Wang Jin; Assistant referees: Mu Yuxin, Song Xiangyun; Fourth official: Ai Kun

10 May 2015 Round 9	Guangzhou Evergrande Taobao	6 - 1	Shanghai Shenxin	Guangzhou
20:00 UTC+8	Goulart 29' (pen.); Yu Hanchao 40'; Huang Bowen (yellow card) 57'; Gao Lin 58'; Goulart 69'; Goulart 72'; Yu Hanchao 74'; Mei Fang (yellow card) 78'		Ye Chongqiu (yellow card) 18'; Chima 22'; Yang Jiawei (yellow card) 51'; Chima (yellow card) 81'	Stadium: Tianhe Stadium; Attendance: 39,714; Referee: Li Jun; Assistant referees: Shi Xiang, Zhou Guangya; Fourth official: Li Haihe

15 May 2015 Round 10	Guangzhou Evergrande Taobao	1 - 1	Shanghai SIPG	Guangzhou
20:00 UTC+8	Zhang Linpeng (yellow card) 32'; Zheng Zhi (yellow card) 36'; Gao Lin 45+2'; Huang Bowen (yellow card) 61'		Cai Huikang (yellow card) 76'; Hysén 83'; Fu Huan (yellow card) 89'	Stadium: Tianhe Stadium; Attendance: 48,637; Referee: Wang Zhe; Assistant referees: Huo Weiming, Ma Ji; Fourth official: Li Haihe

23 May 2015 Round 11	Guangzhou Evergrande Taobao	2 - 2	Guangzhou R&F	Guangzhou
20:00 UTC+8	Zhang Jiaqi (yellow card) 41'; Mei Fang (yellow card) 60'; Gao Lin 74' (pen.); Li Xuepeng (yellow card) 75'; Zheng Zhi (yellow card) 78'; Goulart 79'		Míchel 38'; Olanare (yellow card) 72'; Míchel 86' (pen.)	Stadium: Tianhe Stadium; Attendance: 43,790; Referee: Wang Di; Assistant referees: Zhan Wei, Xu Jun; Fourth official: Chen Gang

31 May 2015 Round 12	Guangzhou Evergrande Taobao	3 - 0	Guizhou Moutai	Guangzhou
20:00 UTC+8	Mei Fang (yellow card) 21'; Feng Xiaoting 69'; Yu Hanchao 73'; Zheng Long 87'; Goulart (yellow card) 88'		Yu Rui (yellow card) 50'; Ricardo Santos (yellow card) 58'	Stadium: Tianhe Stadium; Attendance: 38,154; Referee: Ai Kun; Assistant referees: Shi Xiang, Ma Ji; Fourth official: Xing Qi

4 June 2015 Round 13	Guangzhou Evergrande Taobao	2 - 2	Tianjin Teda Quanjian	Guangzhou
20:00 UTC+8	Liu Jian 6'; Gao Lin (yellow card) 79'; Zheng Long 82'; Zou Zheng (yellow card) 90+4'		Wang Qiuming (yellow card) 5'; Barcos 28'; Pouraliganji 33'; Liao Bochao (yellow card) 76'; Lü Wei (red card) 77'; Fan Baiqun (yellow card) 90+2'	Stadium: Tianhe Stadium; Attendance: 42,615; Referee: Zhao Zhizhi; Assistant referees: Xu Peng, Wu Sining; Fourth official: Ma Li

20 June 2015 Round 14	Shandong Luneng Taishan	1 - 2	Guangzhou Evergrande Taobao	Jinan
19:35 UTC+8	Liu Binbin 14'; Aloísio (yellow card) 50'; Zheng Zheng (yellow card) 52'		Zou Zheng 35'; Zou Zheng (yellow card) 42'; Zheng Long 54'; Liu Jian (yellow card) 68'; Zou Zheng (red card) 90+5'	Stadium: Jinan Olympic Sports Center Stadium; Attendance: 41,155; Referee: Wang Jin; Assistant referees: Cao Yi, Yu Yue; Fourth official: Lin Jun

25 June 2015 Round 15	Guangzhou Evergrande Taobao	0 - 0	Beijing Guoan	Guangzhou
20:00 UTC+8	Feng Xiaoting (yellow card) 61'; Dong Xuesheng (yellow card) 90+4'		Zhao Hejing (yellow card) 17'; Damjanović (yellow card) 36'; Lei Tenglong (yellow card) 57'; Yu Dabao (yellow card) 75'; Matić (yellow card) 90+2'	Stadium: Tianhe Stadium; Attendance: 49,879; Referee: Ma Ning; Assistant referees: Mu Yuxin, Shi Xiang; Fourth official: He Xiaohu

28 June 2015 Round 16	Shijiazhuang Ever Bright	1 - 1	Guangzhou Evergrande Taobao	Shijiazhuang
19:35 UTC+8	Mao Jianqing 50'; Feng Shaoshun (yellow card) 60'		Goulart (yellow card) 67'; Gao Lin 73'	Stadium: Yutong International Sports Center; Attendance: 27,113; Referee: Ai Kun; Assistant referees: Ma Ji, Wu Huifeng; Fourth official: Fan Qi

5 July 2015 Round 17	Guangzhou Evergrande Taobao	7 - 0	Chongqing Lifan	Guangzhou
20:00 UTC+8	Yu Hanchao 15'; Huang Bowen 48'; Wang Shangyuan 54'; Gao Lin 57'; Zheng Long 58'; Yu Hanchao 67'; Zheng Long 83'		Feng Jing (yellow card) 5'; Cui Yongzhe (yellow card) 82'	Stadium: Tianhe Stadium; Attendance: 48,641; Referee: Li Jun; Assistant referees: Xu Jun, Zhang Yongjun; Fourth official: Xing Qi

11 July 2015 Round 18	Changchun Yatai	0 - 2	Guangzhou Evergrande Taobao	Changchun
19:00 UTC+8	Zhang Xiaofei (yellow card) 14'; Elek (yellow card) 29'; Huszti (yellow card) 41'; Ma Xiaolei (yellow card) 49'; Huszti (yellow card) 70' (yellow-red card)		Goulart 11'; Goulart 15' (pen.); Yu Hanchao (yellow card) 23'; Feng Xiaoting (yellow card) 36'; Huang Bowen (yellow card) 74'	Stadium: Development Area Stadium; Attendance: 28,615; Referee: He Xiaohu; Assistant referees: Mu Yuxin, Liu Jinyu; Fourth official: Wang Jin

15 July 2015 Round 19	Guangzhou Evergrande Taobao	1 - 1	Henan Jianye	Guangzhou
20:00 UTC+8	Mei Fang (yellow card) 5'; Zheng Zhi (red card) 11'; Zheng Long 22'		Ivo 12'; Long Cheng (yellow card) 47'	Stadium: Tianhe Stadium; Attendance: 48,868; Referee: Ai Kun; Assistant referees: Tong Yong, Lou Fangping; Fourth official: Zhang Long

18 July 2015 Round 20	Liaoning Panjin Whowin	1 - 3	Guangzhou Evergrande Taobao	Panjin
19:35 UTC+8	Chuka 90+2' (pen.)		Gao Lin 20'; Ding Haifeng 56' (o.g.); Gao Lin 73'; Zhang Jiaqi (yellow card) 81'	Stadium: Panjin Jinxiu Stadium; Attendance: 21,037; Referee: Shi Zhenlu; Assistant referees: Cao Yi, Yu Yue; Fourth official: Lin Jun

26 July 2015 Round 21	Hangzhou Greentown	0 - 1	Guangzhou Evergrande Taobao	Hangzhou
19:35 UTC+8	Huang Xiyang (yellow card) 38'; Ge Zhen (yellow card) 48'; Wu Wei (yellow card) 54'; Wang Jiayu (yellow card) 80'		Zheng Long 21'; Wang Shangyuan (yellow card) 37'; Zeng Cheng (yellow card) 38'; Goulart (yellow card) 69'	Stadium: Huanglong Stadium; Attendance: 26,681; Referee: Zhang Lei; Assistant referees: Song Xiangyun, Yang Li; Fourth official: Liu Lin

12 August 2015 Round 22	Jiangsu Guoxin-Sainty	0 - 1	Guangzhou Evergrande Taobao	Nanjing
19:45 UTC+8			Zhang Linpeng (yellow card) 67'; Goulart 90+3'	Stadium: Nanjing Olympic Sports Centre; Attendance: 49,748; Referee: Fan Qi; Assistant referees: Wu Huifeng, Xu Xianghui; Fourth official: Zhang Miao

15 August 2015 Round 23	Guangzhou Evergrande Taobao	2 - 2	Shanghai Greenland Shenhua	Guangzhou
20:00 UTC+8	Feng Xiaoting (yellow card) 17'; Elkeson 58'; Goulart 77'; Zheng Zhi (yellow card) 88'		Ba (yellow card) 38'; Moreno 43'; Zheng Kaimu (yellow card) 45+2'; Li Jianbin (yellow card) 51'; Papadopoulos 88'	Stadium: Tianhe Stadium; Attendance: 47,684; Referee: Li Jun; Assistant referees: Ma Ji, Wu Sining; Fourth official: Zhou Gang

21 August 2015 Round 24	Shanghai Shenxin	2 - 4	Guangzhou Evergrande Taobao	Shanghai
19:45 UTC+8	Barrantes 60'; Barrantes 88' (pen.)		Zhang Linpeng 24'; Zheng Zhi (yellow card) 30'; Zou Zheng (yellow card) 42'; Mei Fang (yellow card) 45'; Robinho 58'; Wang Shangyuan (yellow card) 65'; Yu Hanchao 75'; Robinho 78'	Stadium: Yuanshen Sports Centre Stadium; Attendance: 8,180; Referee: Shi Zhenlu; Assistant referees: Tong Yong, Lou Fangping; Fourth official: Tan Hai

12 September 2015 Round 25	Shanghai SIPG	0 - 3	Guangzhou Evergrande Taobao	Shanghai
19:45 UTC+8	Kim Ju-young (yellow card) 56'; Kim Ju-young (yellow card) 78' (yellow-red card)		Robinho 22'; Huang Bowen (yellow card) 61'; Goulart 76'; Elkeson 79' (pen.); Zhao Xuri (yellow card) 90'	Stadium: Shanghai Stadium; Attendance: 46,977; Referee: Yudai Yamamoto (Japan); Assistant referees: Huo Weiming, Xu Peng; Fourth official: Tan Hai

21 September 2015 Round 26	Guangzhou R&F	1 - 2	Guangzhou Evergrande Taobao	Guangzhou
19:35 UTC+8	Renatinho 18'; Zhang Yaokun (yellow card) 25'; Bokila (yellow card) 90+4'		Liu Jian (yellow card) 27'; Goulart 32' (pen.); Zou Zheng (yellow card) 41'; Zou Zheng 90'	Stadium: Yuexiushan Stadium; Attendance: 13,685; Referee: He Xiaohu; Assistant referees: Wang Dexin, Liu Jinyu; Fourth official: Zhang Long

26 September 2015 Round 27	Guizhou Moutai	2 - 3	Guangzhou Evergrande Taobao	Guiyang
19:35 UTC+8	Santos 14'; Hyuri (yellow card) 29'; Zhu Baojie 39'; Santos (yellow card) 90+4'		Zhang Linpeng 45+1'; Zhang Linpeng (yellow card) 59'; Gao Lin 65'; Paulinho 90+1'; Paulinho (yellow card) 90+3'	Stadium: Guiyang Olympic Sports Center; Attendance: 24,581; Referee: Huang Yejun; Assistant referees: Xu Xianghui, Wu Huifeng; Fourth official: Ma Li

17 October 2015 Round 28	Tianjin Teda Quanjian	0 - 2	Guangzhou Evergrande Taobao	Tianjin
19:35 UTC+8			Goulart 61' (pen.); Goulart 81'	Stadium: Tianjin Olympic Center Stadium; Attendance: 27,668; Referee: Fan Qi; Assistant referees: Tong Yong, Lou Fangping; Fourth official: Shi Zhenlu

25 October 2015 Round 29	Guangzhou Evergrande Taobao	2 - 2	Shandong Luneng Taishan	Guangzhou
15:00 UTC+8	Goulart 6'; Feng Xiaoting (yellow card) 18'; Zhang Linpeng (yellow card) 23'; Elkeson 76'; Zhang Linpeng (yellow card) 82' (yellow-red card)		Li Wei (yellow card) 31'; Montillo 60'; Han Peng 90+4'	Stadium: Tianhe Stadium; Attendance: 51,025; Referee: Alireza Faghani (Iran); Assistant referees: Mu Yuxin, Xu Peng; Fourth official: Ai Kun

31 October 2015 Round 30	Beijing Guoan	0 - 2	Guangzhou Evergrande Taobao	Beijing
15:00 UTC+8	Lei Tenglong (yellow card) 39'; Lei Tenglong (yellow card) 89' (yellow-red card)		Huang Bowen (yellow card) 5'; Paulinho (yellow card) 16'; Goulart 43' (pen.); Yu Hanchao (yellow card) 61'; Paulinho 86'	Stadium: Workers Stadium; Attendance: 53,526; Referee: Hiroyuki Kimura (Japan); Assistant referees: Haruhiro Otsuka (Japan), Toshiyuki Tanaka (Japan); Fourth official: Shi Zhenlu

=== Chinese FA Cup ===
13 May 2015 Third round	Xinjiang Dabancheng Nahuan	2–1	Guangzhou Evergrande Taobao	Ürümqi
18:00 UTC+8	Vicente 44'; Dănălache 90+4' (pen.)		Zhao Xuri (yellow card) 12'; Rong Hao (yellow card) 45'; Zhang Jiaqi 82'; Yi Teng (yellow card) 85'; Li Shuai (red card) 90'; Dong Xuesheng (red card) 90+1'	Stadium: Xinjiang Sports Centre; Attendance: 15,421; Referee: Fan Qi; Assistant referees: Ma Ji, Wu Enning; Fourth official: Luo Haitao

=== Chinese FA Super Cup ===
14 February 2015	Guangzhou Evergrande Taobao	0–0 (3–5 p)	Shandong Luneng Taishan	Hangzhou
16:00 UTC+8	Huang Bowen (yellow card) 71'		Liu Binbin (yellow card) 44'; Zhao Mingjian (yellow card) 65'; Dai Lin (yellow card) 73'	Stadium: Yellow Dragon Sports Center; Attendance: 16,974; Referee: Wang Jin; Assistant referees: Mu Yuxin, Zhang Yongjun; Fourth official: Li Jun
	Penalties
	Elkeson (penalty scored); Goulart (penalty scored); Alan (penalty scored); Huang Bowen (penalty missed)		(penalty scored) Tardelli; (penalty scored) Wang Yongpo; (penalty scored) Júnior Urso; (penalty scored) Zheng Zheng; (penalty scored) Aloísio

=== AFC Champions League ===
==== Group stage ====
Pos	Team	Pld	W	D	L	GF	GA	GD	Pts	Qualification
1	(China) Guangzhou Evergrande	6	3	1	2	9	9	0	10	Advance to knockout stage
2	(South Korea) FC Seoul	6	2	3	1	5	4	+1	9	Advance to knockout stage
3	(Australia) Western Sydney Wanderers	6	2	2	2	9	7	+2	8	
4	(Japan) Kashima Antlers	6	2	0	4	10	13	−3	6	

Source: AFC
Rules for classification: Group stage tiebreakers

25 February 2015	Guangzhou Evergrande (China)	1–0	(South Korea) FC Seoul	Guangzhou, China
20:00 UTC+8	Goulart 31'; Huang Bowen (yellow card) 39'; Feng Xiaoting (yellow card) 62'; Mei Fang (yellow card) 75'	Report; Summary	Kim Chi-woo (yellow card) 65'; Osmar (yellow card) 86'	Stadium: Tianhe Stadium; Attendance: 46,749; Referee: Mohanad Qasim Eesee Sarray (Iraq); Assistant referees: Muayad Mohammed Ali (Iraq), Mohamad Muazi B. Zainal Abidin (Malaysia); Fourth official: Mohd Nafeez Bin Abdul Wahab (Malaysia)

4 March 2015	Western Sydney Wanderers (Australia)	2–3	(China) Guangzhou Evergrande	Sydney, Australia
19:30 UTC+11	Juric (yellow card) 27'; La Rocca 57'; Castelen 90+5'	Report; Summary	Goulart 19'; Zou Zheng (yellow card) 38'; Goulart 58'; Goulart 64'; Zhao Xuri (yellow card) 90+13'	Stadium: Parramatta Stadium; Attendance: 11,418; Referee: Nagor Amir Noor Mohamed (Malaysia); Assistant referees: Azman Ismail (Malaysia), Cheng Oi Cho (Hong Kong); Fourth official: Suhaizi Bin Shukri (Malaysia)

18 March 2015	Guangzhou Evergrande (China)	4–3	(Japan) Kashima Antlers	Guangzhou, China
20:00 UTC+8	Goulart 10'; Elkeson 57'; Goulart 62'; Gao Lin (yellow card) 65'; Zhao Xuri 90+2'	Report; Summary	Takasaki 36'; Takasaki (yellow card) 42'; Doi 51'; Kanazaki (yellow card) 64'; Shibasaki (yellow card) 72'; Shibasaki 90+3'	Stadium: Tianhe Stadium; Attendance: 48,651; Referee: Mohd Amirul Izwan Bin Yaacob (Malaysia); Assistant referees: Mohd Yusri (Malaysia), Azman Ismail (Malaysia); Fourth official: Khurram Shahzad (Pakistan)

7 April 2015	Kashima Antlers (Japan)	2–1	(China) Guangzhou Evergrande	Kashima, Japan
19:00 UTC+9	Endo 19' (pen.); Umebachi (yellow card) 38'; Hwang Seok-ho (yellow card) 39'; Sogahata (yellow card) 67'; Shoji (yellow card) 78'; Takasaki 90+3'	Report; Summary	Liu Jian (yellow card) 21'; Huang Bowen (yellow card) 59'; Zou Zheng (yellow card) 67'; Elkeson 75'; Zheng Zhi (yellow card) 76'	Stadium: Kashima Soccer Stadium; Attendance: 7,033; Referee: Ammar Al-Jeneibi (United Arab Emirates); Assistant referees: Mohamed Al-Hammadi (United Arab Emirates), Zayed Dawood Salman Kamal (United Arab Emirates); Fourth official: Abdulla Ali Abdulla Alaajel Al-Zaabi (United Arab Emirates)

21 April 2015	FC Seoul (South Korea)	0–0	(China) Guangzhou Evergrande	Seoul, South Korea
19:30 UTC+9	Kim Nam-chun (yellow card) 58'; Kim Jin-kyu (yellow card) 88'	Report; Summary	Liu Jian (yellow card) 90'	Stadium: Seoul World Cup Stadium; Attendance: 17,157; Referee: Abdulrahman Al-Jassim (Qatar); Assistant referees: Saoud Ahmed Al-Maqaleh (Qatar), Luay Subhi Adib (Iraq); Fourth official: Wathik Mohammed Abdallah Al-Baag (Iraq)

5 May 2015	Guangzhou Evergrande (China)	0–2	(Australia) Western Sydney Wanderers	Guangzhou, China
19:00 UTC+8		Report; Summary	Bridge 33'; Rukavytsya (yellow card) 75'; Juric 90+3'	Stadium: Tianhe Stadium; Attendance: 35,641; Referee: Nawaf Shukralla (Bahrain); Assistant referees: Yaser Tulefat (Bahrain), Mohamed Jaafar Mohamed Salman (Bahrain); Fourth official: Luk Kin Sun (Hong Kong)

==== Knockout stage ====
===== Round of 16 =====
20 May 2015 1st leg	Seongnam FC (South Korea)	2–1	(China) Guangzhou Evergrande	Seongnam, South Korea
19:30 UTC+9	Jorginho 30'; Jorginho (yellow card) 33'; Kim Do-heon 90+5' (pen.); Hwang Ui-jo (yellow card) 90+5'	Report; Summary	Huang Bowen 42'; Li Xuepeng (red card) 65'	Stadium: Tancheon Sports Complex; Attendance: 13,792; Referee: Mohsen Torky (Iran); Assistant referees: Mansouri Mohammad Reza (Iran), Saeid Alinezhadian (Iran); Fourth official: Akrami Hasan (Iran)

27 May 2015 2nd leg	Guangzhou Evergrande (China)	2–0 (3–2 agg.)	(South Korea) Seongnam FC	Guangzhou, China
20:00 UTC+8	Zheng Long (yellow card) 19'; Goulart 27' (pen.); Mei Fang (yellow card) 33'; Goulart 57'; Huang Bowen (yellow card) 64'; Goulart (yellow card) 84'	Report; Summary	Ricardo Bueno (yellow card) 1'; Kwak Hae-sung (yellow card) 25'; Lim Chae-min (yellow card) 45'; Park Tae-min (yellow card) 87'	Stadium: Tianhe Stadium; Attendance: 48,761; Referee: Ravshan Irmatov (Uzbekistan); Assistant referees: Abdukhamidullo Rasulov (Uzbekistan), Jakhongir Saidov (Uzbekistan); Fourth official: Sherzod Kasimov (Uzbekistan)

===== Quarter-finals =====
25 August 2015 1st leg	Kashiwa Reysol (Japan)	1–3	(China) Guangzhou Evergrande	Kashiwa, Japan
19:00 UTC+9	Kudo 89'	Report; Summary	Suzuki 5' (o.g.); Paulinho (yellow card) 38'; Paulinho 40'; Gao Lin 58'	Stadium: Hitachi Kashiwa Soccer Stadium; Attendance: 14,030; Referee: Fahad Al-Mirdasi (Saudi Arabia); Assistant referees: Abdulah Al-Shalwai (Saudi Arabia), Abu Bakar Al-Amri (Oman); Fourth official: Turki Al-Khudhayr (Saudi Arabia)

15 September 2015 2nd leg	Guangzhou Evergrande (China)	1–1 (4–2 agg.)	(Japan) Kashiwa Reysol	Guangzhou, China
20:00 UTC+8	Huang Bowen 30'; Feng Xiaoting (yellow card) 58'; Zhang Linpeng (yellow card) 62'; Kim Young-gwon (yellow card) 85'	Report; Summary	Cristiano 12'; Ōtsu (yellow card) 85'	Stadium: Tianhe Stadium; Attendance: 48,643; Referee: Alireza Faghani (Iran); Assistant referees: Reza Sokhandan (Iran), Mohammad Reza Mansouri (Iran); Fourth official: Mooud Bonyadifar (Iran)

===== Semi-finals =====
30 September 2015 1st leg	Guangzhou Evergrande (China)	2–1	(Japan) Gamba Osaka	Guangzhou, China
20:00 UTC+8	Huang Bowen 36'; Li Xuepeng (yellow card) 51'; Zheng Zhi 57'	Report; Summary	Feng Xiaoting 13' (o.g.); Konno (yellow card) 65'	Stadium: Tianhe Stadium; Attendance: 48,946; Referee: Nawaf Shukralla (Bahrain); Assistant referees: Ebrahim Saleh (Bahrain), Nawaf Shaheen Moosa (Bahrain); Fourth official: Jameel Juma Abdulhusain Mohamed (Bahrain)

21 October 2015 2nd leg	Gamba Osaka (Japan)	0–0 (1–2 agg.)	(China) Guangzhou Evergrande	Suita, Japan
19:00 UTC+9		Report; Summary	Zeng Cheng (yellow card) 68'; Kim Young-gwon (yellow card) 83'	Stadium: Osaka Expo '70 Stadium; Attendance: 17,310; Referee: Chris Beath (Australia); Assistant referees: Paul Cetrangolo (Australia), Nathan MacDonald (Australia); Fourth official: Sivakorn Pu-Udom (Thailand)

===== Final =====
7 November 2015 1st leg	Al-Ahli (United Arab Emirates)	0–0	(China) Guangzhou Evergrande	Dubai, United Arab Emirates
19:45 UTC+4	Hussain (red card) 84'; Kwon Kyung-won (yellow card) 90+3'	Report; Summary	Elkeson (yellow card) 36'; Mei Fang (yellow card) 80'	Stadium: Al-Rashid Stadium; Attendance: 9,480; Referee: Kim Jong-hyeok (South Korea); Assistant referees: Jeong Hae-sang (South Korea), Yoon Kwang-yeol (South Korea); Fourth official: Kim Hee-gon (South Korea)

21 November 2015 2nd leg	Guangzhou Evergrande (China)	1–0 (1–0 agg.)	(United Arab Emirates) Al-Ahli	Guangzhou, China
20:00 UTC+8	Elkeson 54'; Zou Zheng (yellow card) 72'; Huang Bowen (yellow card) 76'	Report; Summary	Hassan (yellow card) 11'; Khamis (red card) 67'	Stadium: Tianhe Stadium; Attendance: 42,499; Referee: Ravshan Irmatov (Uzbekistan); Assistant referees: Abdukhamidullo Rasulov (Uzbekistan), Jahongir Saidov (Uzbekistan); Fourth official: Valentin Kovalenko (Uzbekistan)

=== FIFA Club World Cup ===
13 December 2015 Quarter-finals	América (Mexico)	1–2	(China) Guangzhou Evergrande	Osaka, Japan
16:00 UTC+9	Peralta 55'	Report	Zheng Long 80'; Feng Xiaoting (yellow card) 88'; Paulinho 90+3'	Stadium: Nagai Stadium; Attendance: 18,772; Referee: Jonas Eriksson (Sweden); Assistant referees: Mathias Klasenius (Sweden), Daniel Wärnmark (Sweden); Fourth official: Sidi Alioum (Cameroon)

17 December 2015 Semi-finals	Barcelona (Spain)	3–0	(China) Guangzhou Evergrande	Yokohama, Japan
19:30 UTC+9	Suárez 39'; Suárez 50'; Suárez 67' (pen.)	Report	Feng Xiaoting (yellow card) 16'	Stadium: International Stadium Yokohama; Attendance: 63,870; Referee: Joel Aguilar (El Salvador); Assistant referees: Juan Francisco Zumba (El Salvador), Marvin César Torrentera (Mexico); Fourth official: Wilmar Roldán (Colombia)

20 December 2015 Third place match	Sanfrecce Hiroshima (Japan)	2–1	(China) Guangzhou Evergrande	Yokohama, Japan
16:00 UTC+9	Satō (yellow card) 30'; Shiotani (yellow card) 65'; Douglas 70'; Asano (yellow card) 73'; Douglas 83'	Report	Paulinho 4'; Zheng Zhi (yellow card) 35'; Mei Fang (yellow card) 60'; Kim Young-gwon (yellow card) 88'	Stadium: International Stadium Yokohama; Attendance: 47,968; Referee: Matt Conger (New Zealand); Assistant referees: Tevita Makasini (Tonga), Simon Lount (New Zealand); Fourth official: Wilmar Roldán (Colombia)

== Statistics ==
As of 20 December 2015

=== Appearances and goals ===
No.	Pos.	Player	Super League			FA Cup			Champions League			Super Cup			Club World Cup			Total		
No.	Pos.	Player	Apps.	Starts	Goals	Apps.	Starts	Goals	Apps.	Starts	Goals	Apps.	Starts	Goals	Apps.	Starts	Goals	Apps.	Starts	Goals
2	MF	(China) Liao Lisheng	1	0	0	0	0	0	1	0	0	0	0	0	0	0	0	2	0	0
3	DF	(China) Mei Fang	21	20	0	0	0	0	9	8	0	1	1	0	1	1	0	32	30	0
4	MF	(China) Zhang Jiaqi	3	2	0	1	1	1	5	1	0	0	0	0	0	0	0	9	4	1
5	DF	(China) Zhang Linpeng	12	10	4	0	0	0	10	10	0	0	0	0	3	3	0	25	23	4
6	DF	(China) Feng Xiaoting	27	27	1	0	0	0	13	13	0	1	1	0	2	2	0	43	43	1
7	FW	(Brazil) Alan Carvalho	0	0	0	0	0	0	1	1	0	1	0	0	0	0	0	2	1	0
8	MF	(Brazil) Renê Júnior	5	4	0	0	0	0	0	0	0	1	1	0	0	0	0	6	5	0
9	FW	(Brazil) Elkeson	16	11	7	0	0	0	11	10	3	1	1	0	3	3	0	31	25	10
10	MF	(China) Zheng Zhi	22	20	1	0	0	0	13	12	1	1	1	0	3	3	0	39	36	2
11	MF	(Brazil) Ricardo Goulart	27	25	19	0	0	0	14	13	8	1	0	0	3	3	0	45	41	27
12	MF	(China) Wang Shangyuan	19	14	1	1	0	0	0	0	0	0	0	0	0	0	0	20	14	1
13	GK	(China) Fang Jingqi	0	0	0	1	0	0	0	0	0	0	0	0	0	0	0	1	0	0
15	DF	(China) Yi Teng	1	1	0	1	1	0	0	0	0	0	0	0	0	0	0	2	2	0
16	MF	(China) Huang Bowen	28	22	1	0	0	0	13	13	3	1	1	0	3	3	0	45	39	4
17	MF	(China) Liu Jian	16	10	1	1	1	0	8	2	0	0	0	0	1	0	0	26	13	1
18	FW	(China) Dong Xuesheng	7	0	0	1	1	0	1	1	0	0	0	0	0	0	0	9	2	0
19	GK	(China) Zeng Cheng	25	25	0	0	0	0	11	11	0	1	1	0	0	0	0	37	37	0
20	MF	(China) Yu Hanchao	23	15	7	0	0	0	12	5	0	1	1	0	3	0	0	39	21	7
21	MF	(China) Zhao Xuri	17	6	0	1	1	0	8	5	1	1	0	0	0	0	0	27	12	1
22	GK	(China) Li Shuai	5	5	0	1	1	0	5	3	0	0	0	0	3	3	0	14	12	0
23	MF	(China) Yang Xin	0	0	0	1	1	0	0	0	0	0	0	0	0	0	0	1	1	0
24	FW	(China) Liang Xueming	0	0	0	1	1	0	0	0	0	0	0	0	0	0	0	1	1	0
25	DF	(China) Zou Zheng	18	18	2	1	1	0	9	6	0	0	0	0	2	2	0	30	27	2
27	MF	(China) Zheng Long	27	22	7	0	0	0	10	8	0	0	0	0	3	1	1	40	31	8
28	DF	(South Korea) Kim Young-gwon	18	15	0	0	0	0	11	11	0	0	0	0	3	3	0	32	29	0
29	FW	(China) Gao Lin	25	20	13	0	0	0	11	7	1	1	1	0	3	1	0	40	29	14
33	DF	(China) Rong Hao	9	7	0	1	1	0	4	2	0	1	1	0	0	0	0	15	11	0
34	MF	(China) Wang Junhui	11	2	0	1	1	0	1	0	0	0	0	0	0	0	0	13	3	0
35	DF	(China) Li Xuepeng	13	11	0	0	0	0	8	6	0	1	1	0	2	1	0	24	19	0
48	MF	(Brazil) Paulinho	13	11	2	0	0	0	6	6	1	0	0	0	3	3	2	22	20	5
56	FW	(Brazil) Robinho	9	7	3	0	0	0	0	0	0	0	0	0	1	1	0	10	8	3
Own goals					2						1									3
TOTALS					71			1			19			0			3			94

=== Goalscorers ===
Rank	Player	No.	Pos.	Super League	FA Cup	Champions League	Super Cup	Club World Cup	Total
1	(Brazil) Ricardo Goulart	11	MF	19	0	8	0	0	27
2	(China) Gao Lin	29	FW	13	0	1	0	0	14
3	(Brazil) Elkeson	9	FW	7	0	3	0	0	10
4	(China) Zheng Long	27	MF	7	0	0	0	1	8
5	(China) Yu Hanchao	20	MF	7	0	0	0	0	7
6	(Brazil) Paulinho	48	MF	2	0	1	0	2	5
7	(China) Zhang Linpeng	5	DF	4	0	0	0	0	4
7	(China) Huang Bowen	16	MF	1	0	3	0	0	4
9	(Brazil) Robinho	56	FW	3	0	0	0	0	3
10	(China) Zheng Zhi	10	MF	1	0	1	0	0	2
10	(China) Zou Zheng	25	DF	2	0	0	0	0	2
12	(China) Zhang Jiaqi	4	MF	0	1	0	0	0	1
12	(China) Feng Xiaoting	6	DF	1	0	0	0	0	1
12	(China) Wang Shangyuan	12	MF	1	0	0	0	0	1
12	(China) Liu Jian	17	MF	1	0	0	0	0	1
12	(China) Zhao Xuri	21	MF	0	0	1	0	0	1
Own goals				2	0	1	0	0	3
TOTALS				71	1	19	0	3	94

=== Assists ===
Rank	Player	No.	Pos.	Super League	FA Cup	Champions League	Super Cup	Club World Cup	Total
1	(Brazil) Ricardo Goulart	11	MF	11	0	0	0	0	11
2	(China) Huang Bowen	16	MF	5	0	4	0	0	9
3	(China) Zheng Long	27	MF	6	0	2	0	0	8
4	(China) Zheng Zhi	10	MF	6	0	1	0	0	7
5	(Brazil) Elkeson	9	FW	4	0	2	0	0	6
5	(China) Gao Lin	29	FW	1	0	3	0	2	6
7	(China) Yu Hanchao	20	MF	3	0	1	0	1	5
8	(China) Zhang Linpeng	5	DF	3	0	0	0	0	3
8	(China) Li Xuepeng	35	DF	3	0	0	0	0	3
10	(China) Liu Jian	17	MF	2	0	0	0	0	2
11	(Brazil) Alan Carvalho	7	FW	0	0	1	0	0	1
11	(Brazil) Renê Júnior	8	MF	1	0	0	0	0	1
11	(China) Wang Shangyuan	12	MF	1	0	0	0	0	1
11	(China) Zou Zheng	25	DF	1	0	0	0	0	1
11	(South Korea) Kim Young-gwon	28	DF	1	0	0	0	0	1
11	(China) Rong Hao	33	DF	0	1	0	0	0	1
Total				48	1	14	0	3	66

=== Disciplinary record ===
No.	Pos.	Player	Super League			FA Cup			Champions League			Super Cup			Club World Cup			Total		
No.	Pos.	Player	Yellow card	(yellow card) (yellow-red card)	Red card	Yellow card	(yellow card) (yellow-red card)	Red card	Yellow card	(yellow card) (yellow-red card)	Red card	Yellow card	(yellow card) (yellow-red card)	Red card	Yellow card	(yellow card) (yellow-red card)	Red card	Yellow card	(yellow card) (yellow-red card)	Red card
3	DF	(China) Mei Fang	6	0	0	0	0	0	3	0	0	0	0	0	1	0	0	10	0	0
4	MF	(China) Zhang Jiaqi	2	0	0	0	0	0	0	0	0	0	0	0	0	0	0	2	0	0
5	DF	(China) Zhang Linpeng	4	1	0	0	0	0	1	0	0	0	0	0	0	0	0	5	1	0
6	DF	(China) Feng Xiaoting	5	0	0	0	0	0	2	0	0	0	0	0	2	0	0	9	0	0
8	MF	(Brazil) Renê Júnior	3	0	0	0	0	0	0	0	0	0	0	0	0	0	0	3	0	0
9	FW	(Brazil) Elkeson	1	0	0	0	0	0	1	0	0	0	0	0	0	0	0	2	0	0
10	MF	(China) Zheng Zhi	4	0	1	0	0	0	1	0	0	0	0	0	1	0	0	6	0	1
11	MF	(Brazil) Ricardo Goulart	6	0	0	0	0	0	1	0	0	0	0	0	0	0	0	7	0	0
12	MF	(China) Wang Shangyuan	3	0	0	0	0	0	0	0	0	0	0	0	0	0	0	3	0	0
15	DF	(China) Yi Teng	0	0	0	1	0	0	0	0	0	0	0	0	0	0	0	1	0	0
16	MF	(China) Huang Bowen	7	0	0	0	0	0	4	0	0	1	0	0	0	0	0	12	0	0
17	MF	(China) Liu Jian	2	0	0	0	0	0	2	0	0	0	0	0	0	0	0	4	0	0
18	FW	(China) Dong Xuesheng	1	0	0	0	0	1	0	0	0	0	0	0	0	0	0	1	0	1
19	GK	(China) Zeng Cheng	1	0	0	0	0	0	1	0	0	0	0	0	0	0	0	2	0	0
20	MF	(China) Yu Hanchao	3	0	0	0	0	0	0	0	0	0	0	0	0	0	0	3	0	0
21	MF	(China) Zhao Xuri	3	0	0	1	0	0	1	0	0	0	0	0	0	0	0	5	0	0
22	GK	(China) Li Shuai	0	0	0	0	0	1	0	0	0	0	0	0	0	0	0	0	0	1
25	DF	(China) Zou Zheng	4	0	1	0	0	0	3	0	0	0	0	0	0	0	0	7	0	1
27	MF	(China) Zheng Long	0	0	0	0	0	0	1	0	0	0	0	0	0	0	0	1	0	0
28	DF	(South Korea) Kim Young-gwon	1	0	0	0	0	0	2	0	0	0	0	0	1	0	0	4	0	0
29	FW	(China) Gao Lin	1	0	0	0	0	0	1	0	0	0	0	0	0	0	0	2	0	0
33	DF	(China) Rong Hao	0	0	0	1	0	0	0	0	0	0	0	0	0	0	0	1	0	0
35	DF	(China) Li Xuepeng	3	0	0	0	0	0	1	0	1	0	0	0	0	0	0	4	0	1
48	MF	(Brazil) Paulinho	2	0	0	0	0	0	1	0	0	0	0	0	0	0	0	3	0	0
TOTALS			62	1	2	3	0	2	26	0	1	1	0	0	5	0	0	99	1	5
