= 2012–13 Championnat de France Amateur =

Championnat de France amateur
- Season: 2012–13
- Promoted: USL Dunkerque; RC Strasbourg; US Colomiers; Luçon
- Relegated: AS Poissy; FC Metz reserves AFC Compiègne; Valenciennes FC reserves FC Montceau Bourgogne; Monts d'Or Azergues Foot; AJ Auxerre reserves UJA Paris; Nancy Lorraine reserves Stade Montois; US Albi; Aviron Bayonnais FC; AS Saint-Étienne reserves ES Viry-Châtillon; SM Caen reserves FC Lorient reserves Le Havre AC reserves Olympique Saumur FC
- Matches: 71
- Goals: 172 (2.42 per match)
- Biggest home win: Mantes 4–0 Poissy (11 August 2012)
- Biggest away win: Saumur 0–3 Saint-Malo (18 August 2012); Lyon B 0–3 Le Pontet (19 August 2012)
- Highest scoring: Amnéville 4–3 Valenciennes B (18 August 2012)

The 2012–13 Championnat de France amateur was the 15th season since its establishment. CA Bastia was the previous season's club champions. The teams and groups were announced in July 2012. The season began on 11 August and ended on 25 May 2013.

== Teams ==
There were eight promoted teams from the Championnat de France amateur 2, replacing the seven teams that were relegated from the Championnat de France amateur following the 2011–12 season. A total of 72 teams competed in the league with 12 clubs suffering relegation to the fifth division, the Championnat de France amateur 2. All non-reserve clubs that secured league status for the season were subject to approval by the DNCG before becoming eligible to participate in the competition.

Teams relegated to Championnat de France amateur from Championnat National

- Bayonne
- Beauvais
- Besançon
- Martigues

Teams promoted to Championnat de France amateur from Championnat de France amateur 2

- Chambly
- Grenoble
- Montceau Bourgogne
- Roye-Noyon
- Saint-Malo
- Stade Bordelais
- Strasbourg
- Trélissac

=== DNCG rulings ===
On 5 June 2012, following a preliminary review of each club's administrative and financial accounts in the Championnat de France amateur, the DNCG ruled that Pacy Vallée-d'Eure and Besançon would be excluded from participating in the CFA and would be relegated to the Division d'Honneur. Besançon later declared bankruptcy. The organization also confirmed its refusal to allow Montceau Bourgogne and Roye-Noyon promotion to the fourth division. All rulings were subject to appeal. On 26 June, the DNCG ruled that Agde would be relegated to the fifth division due to financial irregularities. A month later, Sénart-Moissy was excluded from participation in the CFA.

On 5 July, appeals for both Montceau Bourgogne and Roye-Noyon were heard. After deliberation, the DNCG ruled in favor of allowing each club promotion to the CFA. After failing in a similar appeal, Agde announced that it would appeal to the CNOSF, the National Sporting Committee of France, in order to remain in the CFA. Sénart-Moissy's appeal was also rejected by the DNCG resulting in the club falling to the fifth division.

== League tables ==
=== Group A ===
Pos	Team	Pld	W	D	L	GF	GA	GD	Pts	Promotion or relegation
1	Dunkerque (C, P)	34	20	9	5	47	22	+25	103	Promotion to 2013–14 Championnat National
2	Chambly	34	18	11	5	39	14	+25	99	
3	Beauvais	34	15	11	8	42	38	+4	90	
4	Roye	34	12	14	8	39	35	+4	84	
5	Lille Reserves (Q)	34	13	8	13	39	43	−4	81	Championnat de France amateur Playoffs
6	Aubervilliers	34	14	5	15	35	44	−9	81	
7	Calvi	34	12	10	12	60	45	+15	80	Renounced participation in the next season.
8	Ivry	34	10	16	8	33	31	+2	80	
9	AC Amiens	34	13	5	16	38	44	−6	78	
10	Villemomble	34	10	14	10	37	39	−2	78	
11	Amnéville	34	13	8	13	50	42	+8	78 (Note: On Amnéville was docked three points.)	
12	Lens Reserves	34	12	7	15	42	46	−4	77	
13	Drancy	34	9	16	9	30	28	+2	77	
14	Mantes	34	11	11	12	38	40	−2	76 (Note: On Mantes was docked two points.)	
15	Poissy (R)	34	9	13	12	40	45	−5	74	Relegation to 2013–14 Championnat de France amateur 2
16	Metz Reserves (R)	34	7	11	16	33	47	−14	66	Relegation to 2013–14 Championnat de France amateur 2
17	Compiègne (R)	34	7	12	15	30	42	−12	66 (Note: On Compiègne was one point.)	Relegation to 2013–14 Championnat de France amateur 2
18	Valenciennes Reserves (R)	34	4	13	17	29	56	−27	59	Relegation to 2013–14 Championnat de France amateur 2

Source: French Football Federation
Rules for classification: 1) points; 2) goal difference; 3) number of goals scored.
(C) Champions; (P) Promoted; (Q) Qualified for the phase indicated; (R) Relegated

==== Results ====
Home \ Away	AAC	AMN	AUB	BEA	CLV	CHM	COM	DRN	DUN	IVR	LEN	LIL	MNT	MTZ	POI	ROY	VAL	VMB
AC Amiens		2–0	2–5	1–1	3–0	0–1	1–1	1–2	0–1	0–1	1–2	1–4	1–1	2–3	0–1	1–0	2–0	1–0
Amnéville	0–1		1–2	0–1	3–0	1–1	1–0	1–2	2–3	2–1	1–3	6–0	1–0	2–1	2–2	4–2	4–3	1–3
Aubervilliers	1–2	2–3		1–3	1–0	2–1	0–2	1–0	1–3	1–0	0–3	1–2	1–0	1–0	2–1	1–0	1–0	1–1
Beauvais	1–0	1–0	1–0		0–0	1–1	3–2	1–0	1–1	0–2	2–0	1–0	1–1	2–1	0–2	1–1	0–0	2–2
Calvi	1–2	2–0	1–0	5–2		0–1	2–2	1–1	1–2	2–2	4–2	4–0	5–0	3–1	4–1	2–2	7–0	1–1
Chambly	2–0	0–0	2–0	0–0	0–0		0–1	1–0	1–0	2–0	0–0	2–1	1–0	3–0	2–0	0–0	4–0	1–1
Compiègne	0–0	2–1	1–1	1–2	0–2	0–3		1–0	2–0	1–1	1–2	0–1	0–1	0–1	3–2	0–0	2–2	0–2
Drancy	2–3	2–2	4–1	0–2	1–0	0–0	1–0		0–3	0–0	0–0	2–0	1–1	0–0	3–0	1–1	1–0	0–0
Dunkerque	1–0	1–0	1–0	2–1	2–2	1–0	2–3	0–0		0–1	2–0	0–0	1–1	2–0	1–0	3–0	3–0	4–1
Ivry	1–0	1–1	3–1	0–2	1–3	1–1	1–1	0–0	0–1		1–0	0–0	3–3	1–1	1–1	1–1	1–1	1–1
Lens Reserves	1–2	0–1	2–0	3–2	1–1	0–1	0–2	2–1	0–1	1–4		0–0	3–0	1–0	2–1	1–4	0–0	4–1
Lille Reserves	3–0	2–1	0–1	3–1	1–0	1–2	1–0	1–1	1–2	1–1	1–0		3–1	0–1	0–1	2–2	2–1	2–2
Mantes	1–2	2–0	0–2	0–1	2–0	0–1	2–0	1–1	1–1	1–0	3–2	1–0		0–0	4–0	0–0	2–2	0–0
Metz Reserves	4–2	0–3	1–1	1–1	2–2	2–3	0–0	0–1	0–0	0–1	4–1	1–1	1–3		1–1	1–2	1–0	1–0
Poissy	1–0	1–1	0–0	3–2	4–0	0–2	2–2	1–1	1–1	2–0	1–1	3–1	3–1	1–1		0–1	2–2	0–1
Roye	1–0	0–0	3–1	4–1	2–1	0–0	1–1	2–1	0–0	0–0	2–4	0–1	1–0	2–1	0–1		2–1	2–2
Valenciennes Reserves	1–1	0–0	1–1	0–1	2–1	1–0	1–1	0–0	1–2	0–1	3–0	3–2	2–3	3–1	0–0	0–1		1–3
Villemomble	2–0	1–3	0–1	1–1	1–3	1–0	1–0	1–1	1–0	0–1	0–0	1–2	0–2	2–1	1–1	2–0	1–1	

Source: French Football Federation
Legend: Blue = home team win; Yellow = draw; Red = away team win.

=== Group B ===
Pos	Team	Pld	W	D	L	GF	GA	GD	Pts	Promotion or relegation
1	Strasbourg (C, P)	34	17	11	6	47	29	+18	96	Promotion to 2013–14 Championnat National
2	Raon-l'Étape	34	17	11	6	53	31	+22	96	
3	Grenoble	34	17	11	6	63	30	+33	92 (Note: On Grenoble was docked four points.)	
4	Lyon Duchère	34	15	10	9	49	39	+10	89	
5	Moulins	34	14	12	8	51	36	+15	88	
6	Mulhouse	34	15	8	11	46	39	+7	87	
7	Villefranche	34	12	11	11	44	42	+2	81	
8	Paris Saint-Germain Reserves (Q)	34	10	14	10	44	49	−5	78	Championnat de France amateur Playoffs
9	Jura Sud	34	10	13	11	31	38	−7	77	
10	Yzeure	34	11	10	13	37	35	+2	77	
11	Sochaux Reserves	34	10	10	14	30	34	−4	74	
12	Sarre-Union	34	10	10	14	28	52	−24	74	
13	Belfort	34	9	11	14	31	37	−6	72	
14	Montceau Bourgogne	34	10	8	16	30	43	−13	72	
15	Monts d'Or Azergues (R)	34	10	7	17	37	47	−10	71	Relegation to 2013–14 Championnat de France amateur 2
16	Auxerre Reserves (R)	34	9	10	15	29	52	−23	71	Relegation to 2013–14 Championnat de France amateur 2
17	Maccabi Paris (R)	34	7	14	13	25	33	−8	69	Relegation to 2013–14 Championnat de France amateur 2
18	Nancy Reserves (R)	34	8	9	17	42	51	−9	67	Relegation to 2013–14 Championnat de France amateur 2

Source: French Football Federation
Rules for classification: 1) points; 2) goal difference; 3) number of goals scored.
(C) Champions; (P) Promoted; (Q) Qualified for the phase indicated; (R) Relegated

==== Results ====
Home \ Away	AUX	BLF	GRE	JSF	LYD	MCB	MOB	MDF	MOU	MUL	NCY	PSGR	RLE	SAU	SCX	RCS	VFR	YZE
Auxerre Reserves		1–3	1–3	2–0	1–0	1–0	1–0	0–1	0–0	0–3	2–1	3–3	0–0	0–1	0–2	0–2	0–0	0–0
Belfort	2–1		1–1	1–1	1–1	0–0	0–0	2–0	0–1	1–0	1–0	0–0	1–2	0–0	0–2	0–1	0–2	0–0
Grenoble	7–0	2–1		4–0	0–2	2–0	3–1	4–0	2–2	4–3	2–0	2–1	3–0	6–0	2–0	0–1	2–2	2–2
Jura Sud	1–0	2–0	0–0		0–2	2–1	0–0	0–1	0–0	0–1	2–1	0–1	2–4	0–0	0–3	1–1	2–1	2–0
Lyon Duchère	5–0	1–1	0–0	0–0		1–0	4–2	1–1	1–0	2–1	2–0	4–3	0–3	2–3	2–1	1–5	0–1	0–1
Maccabi Paris	4–0	1–0	0–0	1–1	0–1		0–1	0–2	1–0	1–2	2–1	1–1	0–0	2–2	1–1	1–1	1–0	2–0
Montceau Bourgogne	2–2	0–0	0–0	0–0	2–1	0–0		2–0	0–1	0–2	1–2	3–0	2–3	2–2	0–1	2–0	1–0	2–1
Monts d'Or Azergues	0–1	2–3	1–2	0–2	1–1	1–2	0–1		1–5	2–4	3–1	3–0	1–3	4–1	3–0	1–0	1–3	1–1
Moulins	4–0	0–4	0–0	0–0	1–1	1–0	4–2	2–3		1–1	1–4	4–1	1–1	3–1	1–0	1–1	1–3	2–1
Mulhouse	1–0	1–0	0–0	5–3	2–1	3–1	4–0	0–0	0–2		1–0	1–2	2–0	0–2	0–1	1–1	0–0	1–0
Nancy Reserves	1–0	2–3	1–1	1–2	0–1	0–0	0–1	1–1	3–2	6–1		1–1	0–4	0–2	0–1	1–0	2–2	1–0
Paris Saint-Germain Reserves	2–3	1–0	3–1	2–2	1–2	0–0	2–1	0–2	2–2	4–1	3–2		0–1	2–0	2–1	0–0	0–3	0–0
Raon-l'Étape	1–1	2–2	1–2	1–0	3–3	4–0	1–0	1–0	0–0	2–1	0–0	2–2		4–0	0–0	2–3	3–0	0–2
Sarre-Union	0–4	3–0	1–0	0–1	1–1	3–2	0–2	0–0	2–0	0–3	0–0	1–1	0–2		0–0	1–0	1–1	1–0
Sochaux Reserves	0–0	1–0	2–1	0–1	1–1	0–0	1–0	0–0	0–2	1–1	1–3	1–2	0–1	3–0		0–0	1–2	3–4
Strasbourg	2–2	2–1	2–0	1–1	1–0	2–1	3–0	2–1	0–4	0–0	2–2	1–1	2–0	2–0	1–0		4–0	0–2
Villefranche	1–3	4–1	1–3	2–1	1–2	0–0	2–0	1–0	0–0	2–0	4–4	0–0	0–0	3–0	1–1	2–3		0–3
Yzeure	0–0	0–2	1–2	2–2	1–3	0–0	3–0	1–0	1–3	0–0	2–1	1–1	1–2	2–0	3–1	0–1	2–0	

Source: French Football Federation
Legend: Blue = home team win; Yellow = draw; Red = away team win.

=== Group C ===
Pos	Team	Pld	W	D	L	GF	GA	GD	Pts	Promotion or relegation
1	Colomiers (C, P)	34	18	11	5	42	17	+25	99	Promotion to 2013–14 Championnat National
2	Cannes	34	16	11	7	50	24	+26	93	
3	Hyères	34	16	9	9	39	27	+12	91	
4	Martigues	34	15	10	9	46	31	+15	89	
5	Lyon Reserves (Q)	34	14	10	10	52	34	+18	86	Championnat de France amateur Playoffs
6	Marignane	34	12	13	9	40	34	+6	83	
7	Marseille Consolat	34	13	10	11	55	52	+3	83	
8	Rodez	34	14	6	14	38	50	−12	82	
9	Béziers	34	12	10	12	37	37	0	80	
10	Monaco Reserves	34	11	12	11	46	40	+6	79	
11	Tarbes	34	11	11	12	38	53	−15	78	
12	Le Pontet	34	12	8	14	46	47	−1	78	
13	Valence	34	10	12	12	35	44	−9	76	
14	Pau	34	10	11	13	41	45	−4	75	
15	Mont-de-Marsan (R)	34	8	11	15	42	61	−19	69	Relegation to 2013–14 Championnat de France amateur 2
16	Albi (R)	34	9	8	17	41	57	−16	69	Relegation to 2013–14 Championnat de France amateur 2
17	Bayonne (R)	34	7	12	15	21	36	−15	67	Relegation to 2013–14 Championnat de France amateur 2
18	Saint-Étienne Reserves (R)	34	4	13	17	24	44	−20	59	Relegation to 2013–14 Championnat de France amateur 2

Source: French Football Federation
Rules for classification: 1) points; 2) goal difference; 3) number of goals scored.
(C) Champions; (P) Promoted; (Q) Qualified for the phase indicated; (R) Relegated

==== Results ====
Home \ Away	ALB	BAY	BEZ	CAN	CLM	HYR	LPT	LYO	MAR	MSC	MRT	MON	MDM	PAU	ROD	SET	TRB	VAL
Albi		0–0	2–1	0–2	0–1	3–0	5–3	1–0	3–2	0–2	0–2	1–2	2–4	0–2	2–3	5–0	0–0	1–1
Bayonne	0–0		0–1	1–0	0–0	0–0	1–0	0–1	0–1	2–2	1–0	1–0	3–2	2–3	0–1	1–3	0–0	1–4
Béziers	0–0	1–0		1–0	0–2	2–0	3–0	1–0	0–0	1–2	2–0	0–0	3–2	3–2	3–1	0–2	1–2	1–1
Cannes	1–0	2–1	2–0		1–0	0–0	2–2	1–0	4–0	1–1	0–0	1–1	4–0	1–0	1–2	2–0	4–0	2–0
Colomiers	1–0	2–0	0–0	0–2		0–0	1–0	0–0	1–0	3–1	0–0	3–2	2–0	2–1	3–0	0–0	2–0	4–0
Hyères	2–0	1–0	0–0	1–1	0–1		3–1	1–0	1–0	3–1	0–2	1–0	1–1	1–0	1–2	2–1	5–0	2–0
Le Pontet	1–1	2–1	2–1	1–1	2–0	0–1		0–1	3–1	3–2	2–0	1–1	2–2	5–0	1–2	2–1	1–2	0–0
Lyon Reserves	2–2	3–0	2–3	4–1	1–1	3–1	0–3		3–1	3–1	1–0	3–0	4–0	2–0	5–0	1–1	2–2	3–0
Marignane	0–0	1–1	2–0	0–0	0–0	0–0	2–0	1–0		4–1	2–1	1–1	1–0	4–0	3–0	0–3	2–0	0–0
Marseille Consolat	5–2	1–2	0–0	2–1	2–1	2–0	2–0	1–1	1–1		1–1	4–0	4–1	2–0	2–2	3–0	3–0	1–1
Martigues	3–0	2–1	0–0	0–2	1–1	1–4	3–0	1–0	1–1	1–3		3–0	5–3	2–0	3–1	1–1	1–1	4–0
Monaco Reserves	5–0	1–1	1–0	2–1	1–2	1–0	1–0	1–2	2–1	1–2	1–2		4–0	0–0	1–1	1–1	1–1	4–1
Mont-de-Marsan	4–1	0–0	1–1	1–1	0–3	1–1	3–3	1–1	1–2	2–1	1–3	2–1		0–3	4–0	1–0	3–1	1–0
Pau	2–0	0–0	5–4	1–1	0–0	2–2	1–0	1–1	1–2	3–1	0–0	1–1	0–0		2–0	2–0	4–0	1–1
Rodez	1–3	0–0	0–1	0–4	0–2	1–0	0–0	2–2	1–0	2–0	0–1	4–0	2–0	0–2		1–1	2–0	4–1
Saint-Étienne Reserves	3–1	0–1	1–1	0–2	0–2	0–1	1–3	0–1	1–1	1–1	0–1	1–1	1–1	1–1	0–1		0–2	0–0
Tarbes	2–5	0–0	3–2	1–1	2–1	0–2	2–0	2–0	3–1	2–2	2–1	1–3	0–0	3–1	0–1	0–0		2–0
Valence	0–1	2–0	2–0	2–1	1–1	1–2	1–2	2–0	1–1	3–0	0–0	1–1	1–0	3–1	2–1	1–0	2–2	

Source: French Football Federation
Legend: Blue = home team win; Yellow = draw; Red = away team win.

=== Group D ===
Pos	Team	Pld	W	D	L	GF	GA	GD	Pts	Promotion or relegation
1	Vendée Luçon (C, P)	34	19	6	9	68	45	+23	97	Promotion to 2013–14 Championnat National
2	Trélissac	34	18	7	9	58	39	+19	93 (Note: 2 points deducted)	
3	Les Herbiers	34	16	9	9	51	30	+21	91	
4	Saint-Malo	34	13	15	6	50	31	+19	88	
5	Romorantin	34	14	10	10	39	31	+8	86	
6	Bordeaux Reserves (Q)	34	15	7	12	51	43	+8	86	Championnat de France amateur Playoffs
7	Avranches	34	14	9	11	50	35	+15	85	
8	Pontivy	34	14	8	12	40	36	+4	84	
9	Concarneau	34	13	10	11	44	44	0	83	
10	Vendée Fontenay	34	12	12	10	41	38	+3	82	
11	Le Mans Reserves	34	13	5	16	44	53	−9	78	
12	Stade Bordelais	34	11	9	14	49	53	−4	76	
13	Plabennec	34	10	12	12	37	46	−9	76	
14	Viry-Châtillon	34	12	8	14	36	51	−15	75 (Note: 3 points deducted)	
15	Caen Reserves (R)	34	11	8	15	45	51	−6	75	Relegation to 2012–13 Championnat de France amateur 2
16	Lorient Reserves (R)	34	10	7	17	40	57	−17	71	Relegation to 2012–13 Championnat de France amateur 2
17	Havre Reserves (R)	34	8	10	16	31	47	−16	66 (Note: 2 points deducted)	Relegation to 2012–13 Championnat de France amateur 2
18	Saumur (R)	34	5	4	25	32	76	−44	53	Relegation to 2012–13 Championnat de France amateur 2

Source: French Football Federation
Rules for classification: 1) points; 2) goal difference; 3) number of goals scored.
(C) Champions; (P) Promoted; (Q) Qualified for the phase indicated; (R) Relegated

==== Results ====
Home \ Away	AVR	BOR	CAE	CCN	HACR	LMN	LHB	LOR	PLA	PON	RMA	SMA	SMR	BDL	TRL	VFF	VLF	VYC
Avranches		3–0	1–1	4–2	1–1	5–0	0–0	4–0	1–2	0–3	2–1	0–0	2–1	1–1	1–0	1–3	1–2	0–1
Bordeaux Reserves	2–1		3–0	0–2	2–0	3–1	1–0	1–1	2–2	1–0	0–1	2–2	2–0	2–1	1–2	1–1	2–2	4–0
Caen Reserves	2–1	2–1		2–2	1–1	3–2	2–2	3–0	5–0	1–1	2–3	0–2	4–1	2–0	0–2	1–2	2–0	1–0
Concarneau	0–2	2–0	3–0		1–1	1–0	0–3	2–2	1–1	0–1	2–0	2–1	1–2	3–2	0–2	1–0	0–0	2–2
Havre Reserves	0–1	2–0	1–2	0–3		1–0	0–1	1–0	0–1	2–0	0–0	2–0	1–0	2–2	1–4	0–3	0–2	1–2
Le Mans Reserves	2–1	1–0	2–1	0–2	3–1		1–3	1–3	0–2	2–0	2–1	1–3	1–0	1–0	1–3	2–3	0–3	5–1
Les Herbiers	0–1	1–2	3–0	1–1	3–1	0–1		3–1	1–1	3–0	2–2	1–3	1–0	1–1	0–0	1–2	1–0	0–1
Lorient Reserves	0–2	1–3	2–1	0–3	0–0	2–2	2–3		2–1	2–1	3–2	1–1	1–3	3–0	0–3	0–0	3–1	1–1
Plabennec	0–3	0–1	1–0	0–0	1–0	0–3	0–2	0–2		4–1	1–1	0–0	3–1	1–0	0–2	1–1	2–3	3–0
Pontivy	3–2	0–2	0–0	3–0	1–2	2–0	1–0	2–0	1–1		0–0	1–1	1–0	3–0	2–3	1–0	1–1	1–1
Romorantin	0–1	1–1	2–1	3–1	1–0	1–1	0–1	1–0	2–0	1–2		2–2	0–0	1–0	0–1	0–0	1–0	3–0
Saint-Malo	2–0	1–0	4–1	0–1	1–1	0–0	0–0	1–0	2–0	2–0	1–1		3–0	2–3	0–0	0–0	3–1	4–0
Saumur	0–4	1–4	0–2	2–3	0–2	2–4	1–3	2–3	1–1	1–1	0–2	0–3		2–1	1–3	1–3	0–3	1–0
Stade Bordelais	1–1	2–2	2–1	4–0	2–2	2–1	2–2	2–3	1–0	0–3	1–0	4–1	5–1		4–2	0–1	2–4	0–0
Trélissac	2–0	4–2	3–0	1–0	3–1	0–0	1–4	2–1	2–2	0–1	1–2	1–1	3–3	1–1		2–0	0–2	4–0
Vendée Fontenay	1–1	1–0	1–1	1–1	2–2	2–2	0–2	1–0	2–2	0–2	0–2	2–2	0–2	0–1	1–0		1–2	0–2
Vendée Luçon	2–2	2–3	0–0	2–0	4–2	2–1	0–2	2–0	2–3	1–0	3–1	2–2	4–2	4–1	4–1	2–4		3–1
Viry-Châtillon	0–0	3–1	3–1	2–2	0–0	0–1	2–1	2–1	1–1	3–1	0–1	2–0	2–1	0–1	3–0	0–3	1–3	

Source: French Football Federation
Legend: Blue = home team win; Yellow = draw; Red = away team win.
