= Nzé =

Nzé is a surname. Notable people with the surname include:

- Pierre Nzé (born 1939), Congolese politician and diplomat
- Selim Haroun Nzé (born 1993), Algerian-Gabonese footballer

== See also ==
- Nze (disambiguation)
- N'Ze (disambiguation)
- NZE (disambiguation)
