= N'Ze =

N'Ze may refer to:

- Marcus N'Ze, a footballer from Ghana
- Desmond N'Ze, a footballer from Ghana

== See also ==
- Nze (disambiguation)
- Nzé (disambiguation)
- NZE (disambiguation)
