= Nicolas Martinetti =

French footballer (born 1989)

Personal information
- Date of birth: January 1, 1989 (age 37)
- Place of birth: Ajaccio, France
- Position: Midfielder

Team information
- Current team: FCA Calvi
- Number: 8

Senior career*
Years	Team	Apps	(Gls)
2007–2009	Bastia	4	(0)
2009–2010	Gazélec Ajaccio	10	(0)
2010–	FCA Calvi	5	(0)

International career
2009–	Corsica	1	(0)
- * Club domestic league appearances and goals

Nicolas Martinetti (born January 1, 1989, in Ajaccio) is a French professional football player who currently plays for FC Aregno Calvi.

== Career ==
He played on the professional level in Ligue 2 for SC Bastia. He played the 2009/2010 season in the Championnat de France amateur for Gazélec Ajaccio, before in July 2010 signed for FC Aregno Calvi.
