= Fodie Traore =

French footballer (born 1985)

Fodie Traoré (born 1 March 1985 in Bondy, France) is a French former professional footballer who played as a midfielder on the professional level for French Ligue 1 club Stade Brestois 29 in the 2010–11 season.

== See also ==
- Football in France
- List of football clubs in France
- List of French football transfers summer 2010
