= Nze =

Nze may refer to:

- Kaga Nze, a village in the Central African Republic
- Nze na Ozo, a grouping in the Igbo society of Southeast Nigeria
- Genoveva Añonma Nze, a footballer from Equatorial Guinea

== See also ==
- N'Ze (disambiguation)
- Nzé (disambiguation)
- NZE (disambiguation)
