= Didier Santini =

French footballer (born 1968)

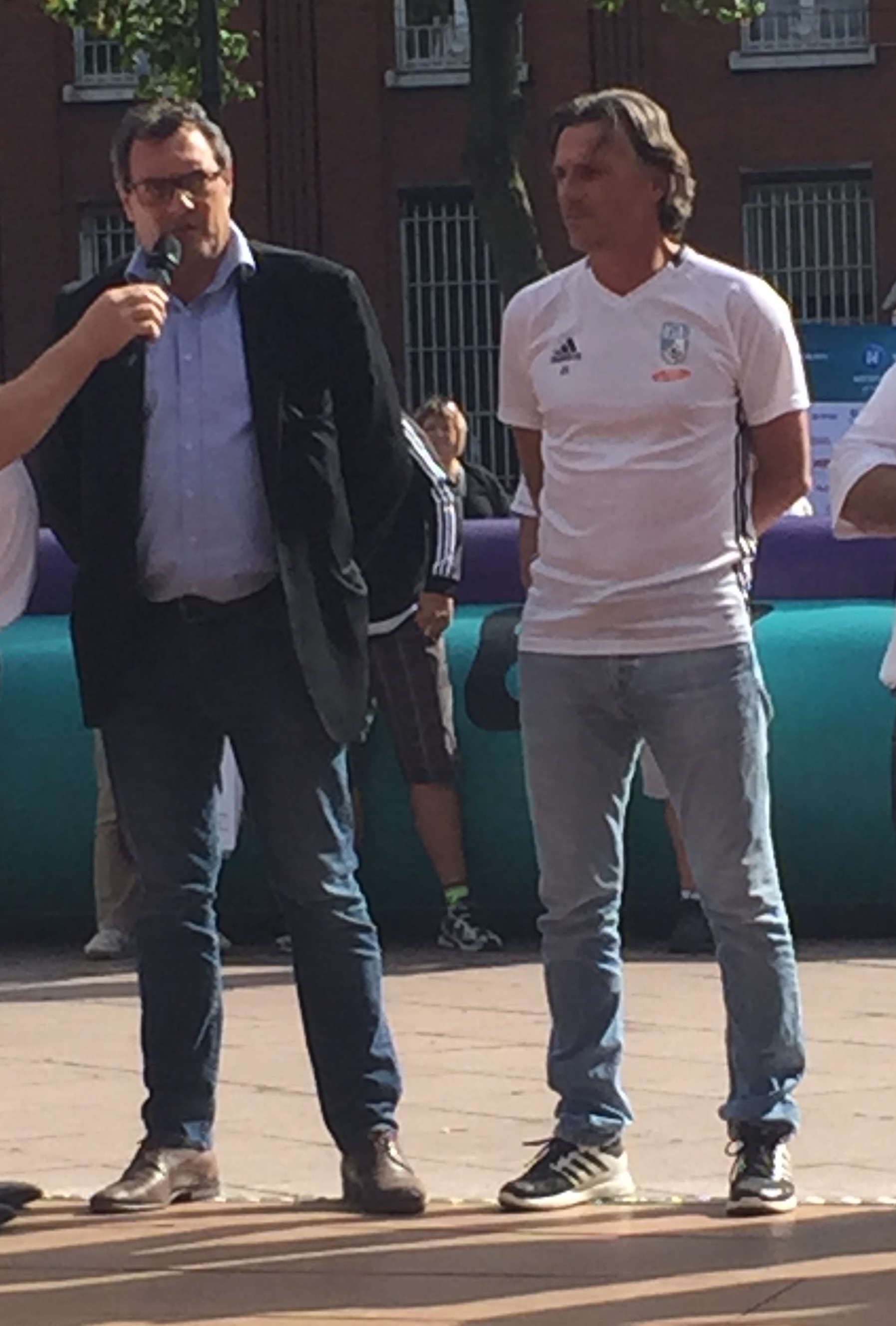
- Santini as Dunkerque manager in September 2016

Personal information
- Date of birth: 7 September 1968 (age 58)
- Place of birth: Marseille, France
- Height: 1.78 m (5 ft 10 in)
- Position: Defender

Senior career*
Years	Team	Apps	(Gls)
1986–1989	Marseille B		
1987–1989	Marseille	5	(0)
1989–1997	Bastia	174	(2)
1997–1999	Toulouse	36	(1)
1999–2001	Lille	15	(0)
2001–2002	Livingston	21	(0)
2002–2003	CABG Lucciana		
2003–2004	Borgo		

Managerial career
- 2009–2013: Calvi
- 2014–2016: Borgo
- 2016–2018: Dunkerque
- 2019–2021: Béziers
- 2021–2022: Stade Briochin
- 2022–: Rodez
- * Club domestic league appearances and goals

Didier Santini (born 7 September 1968) is a French football manager and former player who is the manager of Ligue 2 club Rodez.

He spent the majority of his playing career in the top two divisions of French football with Marseille, Bastia, Toulouse and Lille. In the 2001–02 season, he had a spell with Scottish Premier League side Livingston.

== Coaching career ==
After retiring, Santini began his coaching career as a youth coach for SC Bastia. Santini was then appointed manager of CFA2 club Calvi in 2009. Two years later, he led the team to promotion to the CFA.

In the summer 2018, Santini was appointed assistant manager for China national under-19 football team under manager Patrick Gonfalone, who he met in 2017 during his process to gain a coaching license. On 9 November 2019, he became the manager of AS Béziers. He left by mutual consent in April 2021.

Santini was appointed head coach of Stade Briochin in 2021, but was dismissed from his duties in September 2022.

In November 2022, Santini took charge of Rodez AF, at the time in the relegation zone of Ligue 2. Santini replaced long-time manager Laurent Peyrelade.
