= Zhang Jiaqi (footballer) =

Chinese footballer

Zhang Jiaqi 张佳祺
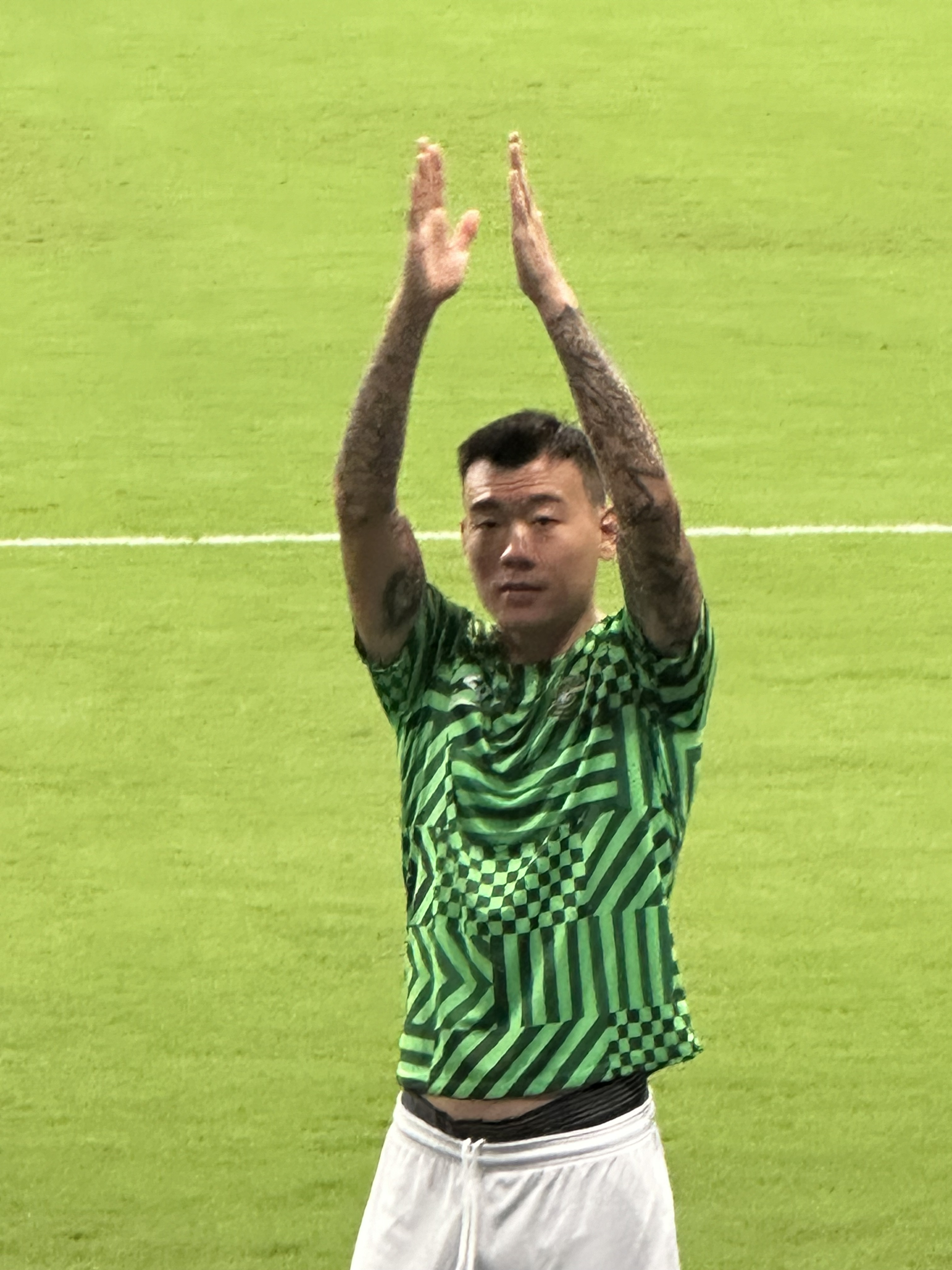
- Zhang Jiaqi in August 2024

Personal information
- Full name: Zhang Jiaqi
- Date of birth: 9 December 1991 (age 34)
- Place of birth: Shenyang, Liaoning, China
- Height: 1.92 m (6 ft 4 in)
- Position: Defensive midfielder

Team information
- Current team: Zhejiang FC
- Number: 29

Youth career
- 2009–2011: Le Mans

Senior career*
Years	Team	Apps	(Gls)
2010–2012	Le Mans B	41	(3)
2012–2013	Le Mans	12	(1)
2013	Sion	0	(0)
2014	Dalian Aerbin	20	(0)
2015–2019	Guangzhou Evergrande	3	(0)
2016	→ Qingdao Huanghai (loan)	9	(1)
2017	→ Shenzhen FC (loan)	21	(0)
2018	→ Guangzhou R&F (loan)	1	(0)
2019	→ Qingdao Huanghai (loan)	12	(1)
2020–2021	Sichuan Jiuniu	36	(4)
2022–	Zhejiang FC	93	(3)

International career^{‡}
2014–	China	7	(0)
- * Club domestic league appearances and goals as of 19 November 2026 ‡ National team caps and goals as of 26 November 2023

Zhang Jiaqi (Chinese: 张佳祺; pinyin: Zhāng Jiāqí; Mandarin pronunciation: [ʈʂáŋ tɕjá tɕʰǐ]; born 9 December 1991) is a Chinese professional footballer who plays as a defensive midfielder for Zhejiang FC and the China national team.

== Club career ==
Zhang Jiaqi started his football career playing for Le Mans' youth academy. He played for their reserve team before being promoted to the first team in 2012. Zhang made his debut for the club on 8 February 2013 in a 1–1 draw against Clermont Foot. After starting three consecutive games, Zhang scored his first goal on 22 February 2013 in a 3–2 win against Niort which turned out to be the match winner. Zhang became a mainstay in the team's starting eleven for the rest of the season; however, Le Mans was relegated to the third tier on the last day of the 2012–13 season. In November 2013, Swiss Super League side FC Sion announced Zhang had signed a contract with the club after Le Mans lost its professional status; however, Zhang could not register for the club because they had already reached the maximum 25 players allowed in the squad.

On 27 February 2014, Zhang was signed by top tier side Dalian Aerbin on a free transfer. He made his debut for the club on 30 April 2014 in a 1–1 draw against Guizhou Renhe.

On 24 December 2014, Zhang transferred to fellow Chinese Super League side Guangzhou Evergrande after Dalian was relegated at the end of the 2014 season. He was used as a rotation player at the beginning of 2015 season; however, he didn't appear for Guangzhou after Luiz Felipe Scolari became the manager of the club in June 2015. Zhang was downgraded to the reserve squad in the 2016 season.

On 15 July 2016, he was loaned to China League One side Qingdao Huanghai for the rest of the 2016 season. He made his debut for the club on 16 July 2016 in a 1–1 draw against Meizhou Hakka. On 23 January 2017, Zhang was loaned to second tier side Shenzhen FC for the 2017 season. In February 2018, he was loaned to Guangzhou Evergrande's city rivals Guangzhou R&F for the 2018 season. Failing to establish himself within the team, Zhang appeared just one league match and two FA Cup matches for Guangzhou R&F. Zhang was loaned to Qingdao Huanghai for the second time for one season in February 2019.

On 25 May 2020, Zhang transferred to China League One side Sichuan Jiuniu.

On 16 April 2020, Zhang transferred to Chinese Super League side Zhejiang FC, the second time he joined the club managed by Jordi Vinyals.

== International career ==
Zhang made his China national team debut on 18 June 2014, in their 2–0 win against Macedonia.

== Career statistics ==
=== Club ===
As of 15 October 2022

Appearances and goals by club, season and competition
Club	Season	League			National Cup		League Cup		Continental		Other		Total	
Club	Season	Division	Apps	Goals	Apps	Goals	Apps	Goals	Apps	Goals	Apps	Goals	Apps	Goals
Le Mans B	2010–11	CFA	6	0	0	0	–		–		–		6	0
Le Mans B	2011–12	CFA	23	3	0	0	–		–		–		23	3
Le Mans B	2012–13	CFA	12	0	0	0	–		–		–		12	0
Le Mans B	Total		41	3	0	0	0	0	0	0	0	0	41	3
Le Mans	2012–13	Ligue 2	12	1	0	0	0	0	–		–		12	1
Dalian Aerbin	2014	Chinese Super League	20	0	0	0	–		–		–		20	0
Guangzhou Evergrande	2015	Chinese Super League	3	0	1	1	–		5	0	0 (Note: Appearances in Chinese FA Super Cup)	0	9	1
Qingdao Huanghai (loan)	2016	China League One	9	1	0	0	–		–		–		9	1
Shenzhen FC (loan)	2017	China League One	21	0	0	0	–		–		–		21	0
Guangzhou R&F (loan)	2018	Chinese Super League	1	0	2	1	–		–		–		3	1
Qingdao Huanghai (loan)	2019	China League One	12	1	2	0	–		–		–		14	1
Sichuan Jiuniu	2020	China League One	13	1	–		–		–		–		13	1
Sichuan Jiuniu	2021	China League One	23	3	4	1	–		–		–		27	4
Sichuan Jiuniu	Total		36	4	4	1	0	0	0	0	0	0	40	5
Zhejiang	2022	Chinese Super League	25	1	4	0	–		–		–		29	1
Career total			180	11	13	3	0	0	5	0	0	0	198	14

=== International statistics ===
National team
Year	Apps	Goals
2014	5	0
2023	2	0
Total	7	0

== Honours ==
Guangzhou Evergrande

- Chinese Super League: 2015
- AFC Champions League: 2015

Qingdao Huanghai

- China League One: 2019
