= NZE (disambiguation) =

NZE may refer to:

- New Zealand, UNDP code
- New Zealand English, the variety of English spoken in New Zealand
- Nzérékoré Airport, Guinea (by IATA code)
- Net zero emissions - a target for climate change amelioration

== See also ==
- Nze (disambiguation)
- Nzé (disambiguation)
- N'Ze (disambiguation)
