= FCA Calvi =

Calvi
- Full name: Football Club Aregno Calvi
- Founded: 1953
- Ground: Stade Faustin Bartoli, Calvi, Haute-Corse
- Chairman: Didier Bichieray
- Manager: Didier Santini
- League: CFA Group A
- 2011–12: CFA Group A, 6th
Home colours

Football Club Aregno Calvi is a French association football club. They are based in the town of Calvi, Haute-Corse and their home stadium is the Stade Faustin Bartoli. As of the 2012–13 season, they play in the Championnat de France amateur Group A.

== Current squad ==
- Goalkeepers
  - Jacques André Luciani 09/06/1989 FRA Bastia (20)
  - Florent Menozzi 17/07/1979 FRA Bastia (20)
- Défenders
  - Jean Dominique Ciavaldini 27/02/1980 FRA Bastia (20)
  - Yoann Daniel Cirne Lemos 26/02/1988 FRA Marseille (13)
  - Yves Gentili 30/05/1989 FRA Ajaccio (20)
  - Nicolas Martinetti 01/01/1989 FRA Ajaccio (20)
  - Dominique Menozzi 04/08/1974 FRA Marseille (13)
  - Grégory Richier 06/03/1985 FRA Nice (06)
- Midfielder
  - Jérôme Bérardi 29/01/1979 FRA Marseille 4e (13)
  - Vincent Giannone 07/01/1989 FRA Bastia (20)
  - Nicolas Gomes 01/12/1986 FRA Bastia (20)
  - Olivier Oggiano 19/11/1992 FRA Porto Vecchio
  - Jean Marc Sauli 27/05/1978 FRA Bastia (20)
  - Thierry Ventura 23/01/1990 FRA Bastia (20)
- Attacker
  - Dimitri Lesueur 25/01/1987 FRA FC Istres
  - Franck Muller 02/08/1982 FRA Lyon 4e (69)
  - Jonathan Portillo 18/02/1989 FRA Lormont (33)
  - Rosthan Rafai 03/04/1986 FRA Nice (06)
  - Sylvain Reynouard 28/02/1985 FRA Aubenas (07)
  - Thierry Ricco 30/09/1974 FRA Bastia (20)
  - Malik Tchokounte 11/09/1988 FRA Nice (06)
- Entraîneur' : Didier Santini

== Notable players ==
- Walter Bakouma
- Nicolas Martinetti
- François Orsini
- Simon Perrin
