= Olivier Cassan =

French footballer (born 1984)

Personal information
- Date of birth: 1 June 1984 (age 42)
- Place of birth: Rodez, France
- Height: 1.80 m (5 ft 11 in)
- Position: Midfielder

Senior career*
Years	Team	Apps	(Gls)
2002–2005	Onet-le-Château	?	(?)
2005–2010	Rodez	154	(21)
2010–2013	Metz	12	(1)
2012	→ Martigues (loan)	9	(0)
2014–2016	Progrès Niederkorn	54	(8)
2017–2018	Käerjéng 97	13	(2)
2018–2019	ES Maizières-lès-Metz		
2019–2020	CSO Amnéville	23	(3)
- * Club domestic league appearances and goals

Olivier Cassan (born 1 June 1984) is a French professional footballer who played as a midfielder.

== Career ==
Born in Rodez, Cassan started his career with Onet-le-Château, assisting the Division d'Honneur club for three seasons between 2002 and 2005. At the start of the 2005–06 season he was signed by his hometown club, Championnat de France amateur side Rodez. He was part of the team that won promotion to the Championnat National two years later. Cassan established himself as a first-team regular at Rodez, appearing in more than 150 league matches for the club.

On 29 June 2010, Cassan transferred to Ligue 2 club Metz on a three-year contract. He made 11 league appearances in the 2010–11 season and scored his first goal for the club in the 2–2 draw away at Tours on 4 October. However, he fell out of favour at Metz and was not selected for any first-team matches during the first half of the 2011–12 campaign. On 3 January 2012, it was announced that Cassan had joined National outfit Martigues on loan until the end of the season.

Ahead of the 2019–20 season, Cassan joined CSO Amnéville.
