= CSO Amnéville =

French football club

- Full name: Club Sportif Orne 1919 Amnéville-les-Thermes
- Founded: 1919; 106 years ago
- President: Sylvain Zille
- Joint managers: Eric Skora
- League: Régional 1 Grand Est
- 2021–22: National 3 Group F, 14th (relegated)
- Website: https://www.cso-amneville.com

Club Sportif Orne 1919 Amnéville-les-Thermes is a French association football team founded in 1919. They are based in Amnéville, France and are playing in the sixth tier in the French football league system. They play at the Stade André Valentin in Amnéville.

In the summer of 2017 the club had a controversial dispute with the French Football Federation after being denied promotion for financial reasons. They were eventually admitted to the Championnat National 3 a month into the season, having already played games in the regional league.

== Current squad ==
As of 5 September 2020

Note: Flags indicate national team as defined under FIFA eligibility rules; some limited exceptions apply. Players may hold more than one non-FIFA nationality.

No.	Pos.	Nation	Player
—	GK	(France) FRA	Arnaud Dropsy
—	GK	(France) FRA	Quentin Keldenich
—	GK	(France) FRA	Allan Luthardt
—	DF	(Nigeria) NGA	Oluwole Adebayo
—	DF	(France) FRA	Alexis Maire
—	DF	(France) FRA	Mehdi Martin
—	DF	(France) FRA	Romain Ney
—	DF	(France) FRA	Launy Simion
—	DF	(France) FRA	Belaid Smah
—	DF	(Ivory Coast) CIV	Bryan Yrio
—	MF	(Algeria) ALG	Billel Abdelkadous
—	MF	(France) FRA	Maxime Bourgeois
—	MF	(France) FRA	Braga Camara
—	MF	(France) FRA	Olivier Cassan
—	MF	(France) FRA	Michaël Faletti

No.	Pos.	Nation	Player
—	MF	(France) FRA	Bilal Ali Hend
—	MF	(Algeria) ALG	Abel Khaled
—	MF	(France) FRA	Jérémy Lauratet
—	MF	(France) FRA	Valentin Poinsignon
—	MF	(France) FRA	Dylan Suray
—	MF	(France) FRA	Yohann Vetro
—	FW	(France) FRA	Ibrahim Baradji
—	FW	(France) FRA	Hakim Boussena
—	FW	(France) FRA	Elvis Delgado
—	FW	(France) FRA	Hearvin Djetou
—	FW	(France) FRA	Karl Fuller
—	FW	(France) FRA	Paul Maurice
—	FW	(France) FRA	Lucas Pignatone
—	FW	(France) FRA	Michel Zé
