= Zou Zheng =

Chinese footballer

Zou Zheng 邹正
Personal information
- Full name: Zou Zheng
- Date of birth: 7 February 1988 (age 38)
- Place of birth: Qingdao, Shandong, China
- Height: 1.80 m (5 ft 11 in)
- Position: Left-back

Youth career
- 2001–2002: Qingdao Hainiu
- 2005–2007: Qingdao Jonoon

Senior career*
Years	Team	Apps	(Gls)
2007–2014	Qingdao Jonoon	170	(13)
2015–2018	Guangzhou Evergrande	45	(3)
2019–2021	Guangzhou City	9	(0)
2020	→ Qingdao Huanghai (loan)	11	(0)
2021	→ Qingdao FC (loan)	12	(0)
2022	Sichuan Jiuniu	20	(0)
2023	Guangxi Pingguo Haliao	22	(0)
Total		289	(16)

International career
2015	China	3	(0)
- * Club domestic league appearances and goals

Zou Zheng (Chinese: 邹正; pinyin: Zōu Zhèng; Mandarin pronunciation: [tsóʊ ʈʂə̂ŋ]; born 7 February 1988) is a Chinese former professional footballer who played as a left-back, most notably for Qingdao Jonoon and Guangzhou Evergrande Taobao, as well as for the China national team.

== Club career ==
Zou Zheng started his football career playing for Qingdao Jonoon's youth academy in 2001. He moved to Auckland with his parents between 2002 and 2005. He returned to Qingdao Jonoon and was promoted to the first team during the 2007 season. He made his debut for the club on 4 November 2007 in a 2–2 draw against Shenzhen Xiangxue. The following season saw him gain significant playing time as a substitute, which also led to him scoring his first goal for the club on 15 September 2008 in a 2–1 win against Dalian Shide. His progression would continue the following season due to his versatility which saw him become a regular for the club.

On 24 December 2014, Zou transferred to Chinese Super League side Guangzhou Evergrande. He made his debut for the club on 9 March 2015 in a 2–1 win against Shijiazhuang Ever Bright. Zou scored his first goal for the club on 20 June 2015 in a 2–1 win against Shandong Luneng Taishan; however, he was also sent off during stoppage time. On 21 September 2015, Zou scored his second goal of the season in a 2–1 win against Guangzhou R&F. Zou made thirty appearances for Guangzhou and won his first Super League and AFC Champions League titles at the end of the 2015 season.

On 17 December 2015, Zou suffered a fibula fracture and dislocation of an ankle joint in his left leg during the 2015 FIFA Club World Cup semifinals against Barcelona when he was knocked off balance by Luis Suárez. He received surgery twice in Japan on 18 December 2015 and 4 January 2016 respectively. Zou made his return from injury on 15 October 2016 in a 6–0 away win against Shijiazhuang Ever Bright. On 15 July 2017, he scored the winning goal in a 2–1 home win against Shandong Luneng. Zou was linked with a transfer to Tianjin Quanjian after the 2017 season. However, he eventually stayed at the club following a series of disagreements between Guangzhou Evergrande, Tianjin Quanjian and Shanghai Shenhua.

On 28 February 2019, Zou transferred to fellow top tier side Guangzhou R&F, signing a three-year contract.

== International career ==
Zou made his debut for the Chinese national team on 8 September 2015 in a 3-0 win against Maldives during 2018 FIFA World Cup qualification.

== Career statistics ==
=== Club ===
Appearances and goals by club, season and competition
Club	Season	League			National Cup		Continental		Other		Total	
Club	Season	Division	Apps	Goals	Apps	Goals	Apps	Goals	Apps	Goals	Apps	Goals
Qingdao Jonoon	2007	Chinese Super League	1	0	-		-		-		1	0
Qingdao Jonoon	2008	Chinese Super League	22	2	-		-		-		22	2
Qingdao Jonoon	2009	Chinese Super League	25	0	-		-		-		25	0
Qingdao Jonoon	2010	Chinese Super League	28	2	-		-		-		28	2
Qingdao Jonoon	2011	Chinese Super League	29	4	0	0	-		-		29	4
Qingdao Jonoon	2012	Chinese Super League	23	1	0	0	-		-		23	1
Qingdao Jonoon	2013	Chinese Super League	25	2	1	0	-		-		26	2
Qingdao Jonoon	2014	China League One	17	2	2	0	-		-		19	2
Qingdao Jonoon	Total		170	13	3	0	0	0	0	0	173	13
Guangzhou Evergrande	2015	Chinese Super League	18	2	1	0	9	0	2 (Note: Appearances in FIFA Club World Cup)	0	30	2
Guangzhou Evergrande	2016	Chinese Super League	4	0	1	0	0	0	0 (Note: Appearances in Chinese FA Super Cup)	0	5	0
Guangzhou Evergrande	2017	Chinese Super League	15	1	2	0	4	0	0	0	21	1
Guangzhou Evergrande	2018	Chinese Super League	8	0	2	0	0	0	0	0	10	0
Guangzhou Evergrande	Total		45	3	6	0	13	0	2	0	66	3
Guangzhou R&F	2019	Chinese Super League	9	0	1	0	-		-		10	0
Qingdao Huanghai (loan)	2020	Chinese Super League	11	0	0	0	-		-		11	0
Qingdao (loan)	2021	Chinese Super League	12	0	0	0	-		-		12	0
Sichuan Jiuniu	2022	China League One	20	0	1	0	-		-		21	0
Guangxi Pingguo Haliao	2023	China League One	22	0	0	0	-		-		22	0
Career total			289	16	11	0	13	0	2	0	315	16

=== International ===
National team
Year	Apps	Goals
2015	3	0
Total	3	0

== Honours ==
=== Club ===
Guangzhou Evergrande

- Chinese Super League: 2015, 2016, 2017
- AFC Champions League: 2015
- Chinese FA Cup: 2016
- Chinese FA Super Cup: 2016, 2017, 2018
