= Cédric Lubasa =

Congolese footballer

Personal information
- Full name: Cédric Mabeka Lubasa
- Date of birth: 30 September 1983 (age 43)
- Place of birth: Kinshasa, DR Congo
- Height: 1.79 m (5 ft 10 in)
- Position: Winger

Youth career
- 2004–2005: Luzenac

Senior career*
Years	Team	Apps	(Gls)
2005–2008	Luzenac	83	(6)
2008–2009	Fréjus	26	(6)
2009–2010	Fréjus Saint-Raphaël	37	(8)
2010–2012	Clermont	28	(0)
2012	Gazélec Ajaccio	4	(0)
2012–2013	Fréjus Saint-Raphaël	14	(1)
2013–2014	Romorantin	26	(1)
2018–2019	Muret	13	(1)
- * Club domestic league appearances and goals

Cédric Mabeka Lubasa (born 30 September 1983) is a Congolese former professional footballer who played as a winger. He was born in Kinshasa, the capital city of the Democratic Republic of the Congo and first started playing professional football for Luzenac in France.

== Career ==
=== Luzenac ===
Lubasa kick started his professional footballing career in 2004 when he signed for Championnat de France amateur side Luzenac. His first season was fairly unproductive, not managing to get any game time in the regular season. The 2005–06 season proved to be a little more productive acquiring three starts in the league and getting his first taste of cup football making an appearance in the Coupe de France. Over the next two seasons, Lubasa made a further 10 league appearances without scoring.

=== Etoile Sportive Fréjussienne ===
At the start of the 2008–09 season, Lubasa transferred to fellow CFA side Etoile Sportive Fréjussienne. His first season at the club was rather eventful playing 26 games, scoring 6 times and seeing the merger of his team with Stade Raphaëlois. At the end of his first season the merged team was promoted to Championnat National.

=== Étoile Fréjus Saint-Raphaël ===
After the merger between the two clubs, Lubasa saw a lot more game time playing time with Fréjus starting 37 of the 40 league games and playing twice in the Coupe de France scoring 9 times in total. Fréjus finished the season in 6th place.

=== Clermont ===
At the start of the 2010–11 season, Clermont picked up Lubasa on a free transfer. In his first season for Clermont, he appeared 21 times for Clermont and a further 2 in the Coupe de France without scoring.

== Career statistics ==
(Correct as of 30 June 2014)

Club performance			League		Cup		Continental		Total	
Season	Club	League	Apps	Goals	Apps	Goals	Apps	Goals	Apps	Goals
France			League		Coupe de France		Europe		Total	
2005–06	US Luzenac	Championnat de France amateur	3	0	1	0	0	0	4	0
2006–07	US Luzenac	Championnat de France amateur	10	0	0	0	0	0	10	0
2007–08	US Luzenac	Championnat de France amateur	0	0	0	0	0	0	0	0
2008–09	Fréjus	Championnat de France amateur	26	6	0	0	0	0	26	6
2009–10	FSRFC	Championnat National	37	8	2	1	0	0	39	9
2010–11	Clermont	Ligue 2	21	0	2	0	0	0	23	0
2011–12	Clermont	Ligue 2	7	0	0	0	0	0	7	0
2012–13	Gazélec Ajaccio	Ligue 2	4	0	0	0	0	0	4	0
2012–13	FSRFC	Championnat National	14	1	0	0	0	0	14	1
Total	France		122	15	5	1	0	0	127	16
Career total			122	15	5	1	0	0	127	16
