= Dimitri Lesueur =

French footballer (born 1987)

Personal information
- Date of birth: 25 January 1987 (age 39)
- Place of birth: Le Blanc-Mesnil, France
- Height: 5 ft 10 in (1.78 m)
- Position: Forward

Youth career
- –2006: Ajaccio

Senior career*
Years	Team	Apps	(Gls)
2006–2009	Ajaccio	7	(1)
2009–2010	Gazélec Ajaccio		
2010–2012	Istres	17	(0)
2012–2013	Calvi	40	(23)
2013–2014	Sedan	22	(8)
2014–2017	Borgo		
2018–2019	Corte		
2022–2023	SC Bocognano Gravona		
2023–2024	Gazélec Ajaccio		
- * Club domestic league appearances and goals

Dimitri Lesueur (born 25 January 1987) is a French former professional footballer who plays as a forward. He has played in France for AC Ajaccio, where he began his career, Gazélec Ajaccio and FC Istres.

== Career ==
=== Ajaccio ===
Lesueur began his career with Ajaccio in 2006, when the club were playing in Ligue 1, the top division in France. After playing for Ajaccio's youth and reserve sides, Lesueur progressed to the first team. He made his first and only senior appearance for Ajaccio in the 3–1 win over Saint-Étienne on 13 May 2006, coming on as a late substitute for Mathieu Scarpelli. However, despite this appearance Lesueur found first-team action hard to come by. He spent 2006–07 and 2007–08 playing for the club's reserve side, before returning to the first team in 2008–09 and scoring once in seven appearances as the club finished mid-table in Ligue 2. His goal came as a late consolation in a 2–1 loss to Dijon on 30 January 2009. Lesueur left Ajaccio in 2010 to join another Corsica-based club, Gazélec Ajaccio.

=== Gazélec Ajaccio ===
Joining in the 2009–10 season, Lesueur scored three times in seventeen games for Gazélec Ajaccio. That season, Ajaccio finished as runners-up of the Championnat de France amateur, France's fourth division. He left the club on 18 June 2010 to sign for FC Istres of Ligue 2.

=== Istres ===
Lesueur made his debut for Istres in a 0–0 draw with Reims on 17 August 2010, coming on as a late substitute for Paul Kessany. He went on to make seventeen appearances in the 2010–11 season, but he only played the full ninety minutes in one of these games, against former club AC Ajaccio in a 2–0 loss on 20 May 2011. Lesueur scored a late goal to clinch a 2–0 Coupe de France victory over Bastia on 20 November 2010.

=== FCA Calvi ===
In January 2012 it was announced that Lesueur had left the club along with defender Manu Sene. Lesueur subsequently signed for Championnat de France amateur club FCA Calvi on his twenty–fifth birthday, 25 January 2012, at the same time as fellow forward Samir Bertin d'Avesnes. Lesueur missed the start of the 2012–13 season with an ankle injury.

=== sedan ===
Lesueur arrived at Sedanduring the summer 2013.
