= Fabien Barrillon =

French professional footballer (born 1988)

Personal information
- Date of birth: 9 April 1988 (age 38)
- Place of birth: Aubagne, France
- Height: 1.81 m (5 ft 11 in)
- Position: Centre back

Team information
- Current team: Marignane Gignac
- Number: 29

Youth career
- Marseille

Senior career*
Years	Team	Apps	(Gls)
2006–2009	Marseille B		
2009–2010	Cassis Carnoux	23	(0)
2010–2014	Istres	111	(6)
2014–2016	Nîmes	46	(3)
2016	US Créteil	10	(0)
2016–2018	GS Consolat	54	(3)
2018–2019	Annecy	11	(1)
2019–	Marignane Gignac	10	(0)
- * Club domestic league appearances and goals as of 20:53, 19 January 2020 (UTC)

Fabien Barrillon (born 9 April 1988) is a French professional footballer who plays as a defender for Marignane Gignac.

== Club career ==
Barrillon began his career as a youth player for Olympique de Marseille. In January 2008 he was called up for a training camp with the French Under-21 Futsal team for a 4-day camp.

After several seasons playing for Marseille's reserve team, he joined Cassis Carnoux in 2009. The upcoming year he was transferred to Istres, which he also captained, spending four years there. In June 2014, he was about to sign with Romanian side Petrolul Ploiești, moving abroad for the first time, but after it was discovered that he had some medical problems, the transfer broke down.

In June 2019, Barrillon joined Marignane Gignac.
