= Selim Haroun Nzé =

Algerian-Gabonese footballer (born 1993)

Personal information
- Full name: Selim Haroun Nzé
- Date of birth: February 4, 1993 (age 33)
- Place of birth: Boulogne-Billancourt, France
- Position: Central defender

Team information
- Current team: Vila Flor SC

Youth career
- 2001–2007: Boca FC
- 2007–2010: Boulogne-Billancourt
- 2010–2011: Valenciennes

Senior career*
Years	Team	Apps	(Gls)
2011–2013	JSM Béjaïa		
2013–	Vila Flor SC		

International career
2012–2013	Algeria U20		
- * Club domestic league appearances and goals

Selim Haroun Nzé (born February 4, 1993) is an Algerian-Gabonese football player who plays for Vila Flor SC in Portugal.

== Early life ==
Selim was born on February 4, 1993, in Boulogne-Billancourt to an Algerian father and a Gabonese mother.

== International career ==
On January 31, 2012, Haroun was called up for the first time to the Algerian Under-20 National Team.
