= 2014–15 Coupe de France =

Coupe Charles Simon

Tournament details
- Country: France

Final positions
- Champions: Paris Saint-Germain
- Runners-up: Auxerre

Tournament statistics
- Top goal scorer(s): Edinson Cavani; Claudio Beauvue; Zlatan Ibrahimović; Xavier Mercier (4 goals)

The 2014–15 Coupe de France was the 98th season of the most prestigious football cup competition of France. The competition was organised by the French Football Federation (FFF) and was opened to all clubs in French football, as well as clubs from the overseas departments and territories (Guadeloupe, French Guiana, Martinique, Mayotte, New Caledonia, French Polynesia, and Réunion).

Guingamp were the defending champions, having defeated Rennes in the previous season's final, but were knocked out in the semi-finals by Auxerre.

== Teams ==
1. RC Strasbourg
2. SR Colmar
3. Illkirch Graffenstaden
4. US Sarre-Union
5. FC St. Etienne Seltz
6. FC Saverne
7. FC Saint-Louis Neuweg
8. SC Dinsheim
9. FC Mulhouse
10. AS Girancourt Dommartin Chaumou
11. FC Libourne
12. Genêts Anglet
13. Trélissac FC
14. US Lormont
15. Stade Bordelais
16. FC des Graves
17. Vendée Luçon
18. Vendée Poiré-sur-Vie
19. USJA Carquefou
20. SO Cholet
21. USSA Vertou
22. Voltigeurs de Châteaubriant
23. JSC Bellevue Nantes
24. Vendée Fontenay Foot
25. AS Yzeure
26. Aurillac FCA
27. Le Puy Foot 43 Auvergne
28. RC Vichy
29. AS Moulins
30. US Avranches
31. FC Saint-Lô Manche
32. AST Deauville
33. SC Herouvillais
34. Montceau Bourgogne
35. FC Chalon
36. CO Avallonnais
37. CS Louhans-Cuiseaux
38. AS Graces
39. JD Argentré-du-Plessis
40. AS Vitré
41. US Concarneau
42. US Saint-Malo
43. Stade Plabennecois
44. Stade Pontivyen
45. AS Plobannalec-Lesconil
46. AG Plouvorn
47. Dinan-Léhon FC
48. GSI Pontivy
49. AS Ginglin-Cesson
50. FC Guichen
51. AGL Drapeau Fougères
52. Eglantine Vierzon
53. Blois Foot 41
54. Vierzon Foot 18
55. USM Saran
56. FC Chauray
57. US Chauvigny
58. FC Bressuire
59. CA Meymacois
60. ES La Rochelle
61. ESA Brive
62. CS Sedan Ardennes
63. CO Saint-Dizier
64. Sainte-Savine Rivière de Corps
65. EF Reims Sainte-Anne Chatillons
66. Borgo FC
67. SC Bocognano Gravona
68. CA Pontarlier
69. Jura Sud Lavans
70. SC Clémenceau Besançon
71. ES Paulhan-Pézenas
72. RCO Agde
73. Olympique Alès
74. AF Lozère
75. FC Petit-Bard Montpellier
76. Sarreguemines FC
77. SAS Épinal
78. AS Morhange
79. FC Saint Mihiel
80. AS Pagny-sur-Moselle
81. ES Villerupt Thil
82. US Forbach
83. Le Mans FC
84. US St-Berthevin
85. ES Bonchamp
86. FC Martigues
87. GS Consolat
88. FC Istres
89. US Marseille Endoume
90. Étoile Fréjus Saint-Raphaël
91. Marssac Rivières Senouillac Rives du Tarn
92. Séméac Olympique
93. Balma SC
94. Auch Football
95. Tarbes Pyrénées Football
96. Toulouse Rodéo FC
97. US Maubeuge
98. AC Cambrai
99. Iris Club de Croix
100. FC Loon-Plage
101. FC Lille Sud
102. Arras FA
103. US Boulogne
104. Stade Béthunois FC
105. AS Marck
106. US Nœux-les-Mines
107. USL Dunkerque
108. Calais RUFC
109. US Saint-Omer
110. CMS Oissel
111. US Quevilly
112. ESM Gonfreville
113. US Lillebonne
114. Paris FC
115. FCM Aubervilliers
116. US Lusitanos Saint-Maur
117. US Fleury-Mérogis
118. Sainte-Geneviève Sports
119. CS Meaux
120. Olympique Noisy-le-Sec
121. Red Star F.C.
122. AS Saint-Ouen-l'Aumône
123. Champigny F.C. 94
124. AF Bobigny
125. FC Chambly
126. AS Beauvais Oise
127. Amiens SC
128. AC Amiens
129. Ailly sur Somme FC
130. US Laon
131. RC Clermont
132. Aix FC
133. FC Vaulx en Velin
134. FC Limonest Saint-Didier
135. FC Bourgoin jallieu
136. AS Saint-Priest
137. Ain Sud Foot
138. MOS-3 Rivières FC
139. AS Lyon-Duchère
140. Olympique Saint-Marcellin
141. ASF Andrézieux
142. FC Échirolles
143. Grenoble Foot 38
144. Monts d'Or Azergues Foot
145. FC Rhône Vallées
146. Siroco Les Abymes (Guadeloupe)
147. CS Moulien (Guadeloupe)
148. US Matoury (French Guiana)
149. US Macouria (French Guiana)
150. AS Excelsior (Réunion)
151. SS Saint-Louisienne (Réunion)
152. A.S. Tefana (French Polynesia)
153. Les Jumeaux M'Zouasia AS (Mayotte)
154. Club Franciscain (Martinique)
155. Les Aiglons Lamentin (Martinique)
156. AS Magenta (New Caledonia)

== Seventh round ==
There are 88 matches this round. 145 winners from the sixth round are joined by 11 overseas teams and 20 Ligue 2 teams.

| Home team | Score | Away team |
15/16 November
| A.S. Magenta (New Caledonia) | 0–3 | Trélissac FC (4) |
| US Marseille Endoume (6) | 3–1 | FC Échirolles (5) |
| US Saint-Berthevin (7) | 0–7 | Stade Lavallois (2) |
| US Quevilly (4) | 2–0 | (Guadeloupe) Siroco Les Abymes |
| Jeunes d'Argentré Football (9) | 0–10 | Angers SCO (2) |
| FC Chambly (3) | 1–2 | Troyes AC (2) |
| FC Limonest Saint-Didier (6) | 2–5 | FC Sochaux-Montbéliard (2) |
| AS Saint-Ouen-l'Aumône (5) | 0–3 | AC Amiens (4) |
| FC St. Etienne Seltz (7) | 0–4 | RC Strasbourg Alsace (3) |
| Le Puy Foot 43 Auvergne (5) | 1–3 | GS Consolat (3) |
| CA Pontarlier (5) | 0–1 | SAS Épinal (3) |
| Stade Pontivy (6) | 1–3 | Vendée Poiré-sur-Vie Football (3) |
| Aix FC (5) | 0–4 | AC Arles-Avignon (2) |
| Paris FC (3) | 1–0 | Vendée Fontenay Foot (4) |
| AS Ginglin-Cesson (9) | 1–4 | Stade Plabennecois (4) |
| Grace AS (8) | 0–5 | Stade Brestois 29 (2) |
| Dinan-Léhon FC (5) | 2–1 (a.e.t.) | US Saint-Malo (4) |
| ES Bonchamp (6) | 1–2 | AG Plouvorn (6) |
| AS Plobannalec-Lesconil (7) | 1–3 | AS Vitré (4) |
| Fougères AGL (6) | 1–1 (4–1 p) | USJA Carquefou (3) |
| JSC Bellevue Nantes (9) | 1–2 | FC Guichen (6) |
| USM Saran (6) | 0–2 | Tours FC (2) |
| FC Bressuire (5) | 2–1 (a.e.t.) | USSA Vertou (5) |
| Voltigeurs de Châteaubriant (5) | 2–0 (a.e.t.) | Eglantine Vierzon (6) |
| Le Mans FC (5) | 1–0 | Blois Foot 41 (6) |
| ESA Brive (6) | 0–5 | Vendée Luçon Football (3) |
| Football Club Libourne (6) | 1–2 (a.e.t.) | US Lormont (6) |
| Meymac CA (7) | 0–6 | LB Châteauroux (2) |
| US Chauvigny (6) | 1–2 | Chamois Niortais F.C. (2) |
| Vierzon Foot 18 (6) | 1–2 | AS Moulins (4) |
| AS Yzeure (4) | 3–2 (a.e.t.) | FC Chauray (5) |
| Podensac FC des Graves (7) | 0–1 | Stade Bordelais (4) |
| Aurillac FCA (5) | 4–2 | ES La Rochelle (6) |
| FC Petit-Bard Montpellier (7) | 0–1 | FC Istres (3) |
| AF Lozère (6) | 2–0 | RCO Agde (5) |
| Auch Football (6) | 0–2 (a.e.t.) | Nîmes Olympique (2) |
| Toulouse Rodéo FC (5) | 0–0 (4–5 p) | ES Paulhan-Pézenas (6) |
| Genêts Anglet (5) | 1–0 | Balma SC (5) |
| Marssac SRDT (7) | 0–3 | Clermont Foot (2) |
| Séméac Olympique (8) | 0–0 (3–4 p) | Tarbes PF (4) |
| Olympique Alès (5) | 0–1 | AC Ajaccio (2) |
| FC Bourgoin Jallieu (5) | 1–3 | Étoile Fréjus Saint-Raphaël (3) |
| MOS-3 Rivières FC (7) | 2–1 | SC Bocognano Gravona (6) |
| Borgo FC (6) | 2–1 | FC Rhône Vallées (6) |

| Home team | Score | Away team |
15/16 November
| Olympique Saint-Marcellin (7) | 0–1 | Grenoble Foot 38 (4) |
| Ain Sud Foot (6) | 3–4 | AS Lyon-Duchère (4) |
| FC Vaulx-en-Velin (5) | 0–2 | Jura Sud Lavans (4) |
| RC Vichy (6) | 0–9 | Dijon FCO (2) |
| SC Clémenceau Besançon (8) | 2–4 | Monts d'Or Azergues Foot (4) |
| FC Chalon (6) | 0–1 | AS Saint-Priest (4) |
| CS Louhans-Cuiseaux (5) | 1–0 | SR Colmar (3) |
| CO Avallonnais (6) | 0–1 (a.e.t.) | ASF Andrézieux (5) |
| AS Morhange (8) | 0–3 | AS Pagny-sur-Moselle (6) |
| SC Dinsheim (7) | 0–3 | AJ Auxerre (2) |
| FA Illkirch Graffenstaden (7) | 2–1 | AS Girancourt Dommartin (7) |
| FC Saverne (7) | 1–4 | US Sarre-Union (4) |
| FC Montceau Bourgogne (4) | 0–3 | AS Nancy (2) |
| FC Saint-Louis Neuweg (5) | 2–1 | FC Mulhouse (4) |
| US Forbach (5) | 1–0 | ÉF Reims Saint-Anne (6) |
| US Laon (7) | 4–1 | ES Villerupt Thil (7) |
| US Fleury Mérogis (4) | 1–0 (a.e.t.) | Sainte-Savine Rivière des Corps (5) |
| CO Saint-Dizier (6) | 1–2 | AS Beauvais Oise (4) |
| Champigny FC 94 (7) | 2–2 (3–4 p) | CS Sedan Ardennes (4) |
| FC Saint Mihiel (9) | 0–4 | AF Bobigny (6) |
| US Lusitanos Saint-Maur (6) | 4–3 | US Créteil-Lusitanos (2) |
| FC Lille Sud (9) | 0–0 (4–2 p) | FCM Aubervilliers (4) |
| US Maubeuge (6) | 1–3 | Valenciennes FC (2) |
| Béthune ST (6) | 1–2 | Amiens SC (3) |
| US Nœux-les-Mines (6) | 1–2 (a.e.t.) | Red Star F.C. (3) |
| AC Cambrai (6) | 1–3 | Iris Club de Croix (4) |
| CS Meaux (7) | 3–0 | AS Marck (5) |
| Arras FA (4) | 2–0 | Gazélec Ajaccio (2) |
| ESM Gonfreville (5) | 1–1 (1–3 p) | US Orléans (2) |
| AS Trouville Deauville (6) | 1–3 | Le Havre AC (2) |
| US Lillebonne (6) | 2–3 (a.e.t.) | Ailly sur Somme FC (6) |
| US Boulogne (3) | 4–1 | Calais RUFC (4) |
| US Saint-Omer (6) | 3–1 | FC Saint-Lô Manche (5) |
| RC Clermont (7) | 1–6 | USL Dunkerque (3) |
| FC Loon-Plage (6) | 2–0 | Hérouville SC (5) |
| Club Franciscain (Martinique) | 2–0 | Sainte-Geneviève Sports (5) |
| AS Excelsior (Réunion) | 0–2 | US Concarneau (4) |
| US Macouria (French Guiana) | 0–2 | FC Martigues (4) |
| CS Moulien (Guadeloupe) | 1–1 (3–4 p) | Sarreguemines FC (5) |
| CMS Oissel (5) | 1–1 (2–3 p) | (French Guiana) US Matoury |
| US Avranches (3) | 6–1 | (Mayotte) Les Jumeaux M'Zouasia AS |
| GSI Pontivy (4) | 2–2 (4–5 p) | (Réunion) SS Saint-Louisienne |
| Olympique Noisy-le-Sec (5) | 2–1 (a.e.t.) | (French Polynesia) A.S. Tefana |
| SO Cholet (5) | 2–0 | (Martinique) Les Aiglons Lamentin |

== Eighth round ==
There are 44 matches this round.

| 5 December 2014 | Lille Sud (9) | 0–1 | Valenciennes (2) | Villeneuve d'Ascq |
| 21:00 | | | Poepon 90+1' | Stadium: Stadium Lille Métropole; Attendance: 5,000; Referee: Bastien Dechepy |

| 6 December 2014 | Borgo (6) | 2–3 (a.e.t.) | Ajaccio (2) | Borgo |
| 14:00 | Marester 20' (o.g.); Inzerillo 67' | | Madri 30'; Babiloni 72'; Fauvergue 94' | Stadium: Stade Paul-Antoniotti |

| 6 December 2014 | US Lusitanos Saint-Maur (6) | 3–1 (a.e.t.) | AS Moulins (4) | Le Plessis-Trévise |
| 14:00 | Chalier 39' (o.g.); K. Dembélé 115'; Ayi 119' | | Ras 90' (pen.) | Stadium: Complexe Sportif Louison Bobet |

| 6 December 2014 | Guichen (6) | 0–1 (a.e.t.) | Stade Plabennecois (4) | Guichen |
| 14:15 | | | Diatta 109' | Stadium: Stade Charles Gautier |

| 6 December 2014 | Plouvorn (6) | 1–2 | Vendée Poiré-sur-Vie Football (3) | Plouvorn |
| 14:30 | Jacq 36' | | Dikamona 15'; Gbohou 45' | Stadium: Stade Guy de Reals |

| 6 December 2014 | Clermont Foot (2) | 1–1 (a.e.t.) (1–4 p) | SAS Épinal (3) | Clermont-Ferrand |
| 15:00 | Sawadogo 40' | | Diabaté 87' | Stadium: Stade Gabriel Montpied; Attendance: 1,132 |
| | Penalties |
| | Betsch (penalty scored); Moulin (penalty missed); Diogo (penalty missed) | | Colin (penalty scored); Gazagnes (penalty scored); Guyon (penalty scored); Diabaté (penalty scored) |

| 6 December 2014 | Lormont (6) | 0–2 | (Martinique) Club Franciscain | Lormont |
| 15:00 | | | Abaul 34'; Maingé 51' | Stadium: Stade Jules-Ladoumègue |

| 6 December 2014 | ASF Andrézieux (5) | 2–0 | AF Lozère (6) | Andrézieux-Bouthéon |
| 16:00 | Mangara 45'; Barge 57' | | | Stadium: Stade Roger Baudras; Attendance: 650 |

| 6 December 2014 | Jura Sud Lavans (4) | 3–1 | Monts d'Or Azergues Foot (4) | Moirans-en-Montagne |
| 16:00 | Grampeix 15', 64'; Olivier 83' | | Douline 34' | Stadium: Stade Municipal de Moirans |

| 6 December 2014 | Sarreguemines FC (5) | 0–4 | AJ Auxerre (2) | Sarreguemines |
| 16:00 | | | Viale 26'; Nabab 40'; Berthier 56', 72' | Stadium: Stade de la Blies; Attendance: 1,800 |

| 6 December 2014 | Le Havre AC (2) | 0–2 | US Boulogne (3) | Le Havre |
| 17:00 | | | Bègue 38'; Soubervie 59' | Stadium: Stade Océane; Attendance: 3,575 |

| 6 December 2014 | Stade Bordelais (4) | 2–2 (a.e.t.) (4–5 p) | Tours FC (2) | Le Bouscat |
| 17:00 | Janin 88'; Montagnon 101' | | Adnane 24'; Bergougnoux 120' | Stadium: Stade Sainte-Germaine; Attendance: 1,000 |
| | Penalties |
| | Lavie (penalty scored); Tazouti (penalty missed); Gaffory (penalty scored); Faras (penalty missed); Belbachir (penalty scored); Montagnon (penalty missed); Dutournier (penalty scored); Awana (penalty missed) | | Bergougnoux (penalty scored); Ketkeophomphone (penalty missed); Santamaria (penalty scored); Tandia (penalty missed); Chavalerin (penalty scored); Cillard (penalty missed); Schwechlen (penalty scored); Gradit (penalty scored) |

| 6 December 2014 | Arras FA (4) | 2–4 (a.e.t.) | USL Dunkerque (3) | Arras |
| 18:00 | Bernard 5'; Razakanantenaina 59' | | Fofana 52', 119'; Boudaud 90+1'; De Parmentier 105' | Stadium: Stade Degouve-Brabant |

| 6 December 2014 | AS Beauvais Oise (4) | 1–0 (a.e.t.) | AC Amiens (4) | Beauvais |
| 18:00 | Vaury 102' | | | Stadium: Stade Pierre-Brisson |

| 6 December 2014 | Dinan-Léhon FC (5) | 2–1 | Angers SCO (2) | Dinan |
| 18:00 | Jean 24' (pen.); Gbelle 34' | | Eudeline 15' | Stadium: Stade du Clos Gastel; Attendance: 2,500; Referee: Jérôme Brisard |

| 6 December 2014 | Genêts Anglet (5) | 0–2 | Chamois Niortais F.C. (2) | Anglet |
| 18:00 | | | Koukou 42'; Adama Ba 54' | Stadium: Stade Saint Jean; Attendance: 1,201; Referee: Eric Wattellier |

| 6 December 2014 | AS Lyon-Duchère (4) | 1–3 (a.e.t.) | AC Arles-Avignon (2) | Lyon |
| 18:00 | Saline 22' | | Ouaamar 35'; Hammar 92' van Kessel 118' | Stadium: Stade de La Duchère |

| 6 December 2014 | US Marseille Endoume (6) | 1–2 | Nîmes Olympique (2) | Fos sur Mer |
| 18:00 | Franceschi 36' | | Maoulida 2', 61' | Stadium: Stade Parsemain |

| 6 December 2014 | FC Saint-Louis Neuweg (5) | 2–1 | CS Louhans-Cuiseaux (5) | Saint-Louis |
| 18:00 | Jennane 31'; Matter 51' (pen.) | | El Moudane 40' | Stadium: Stade de la Frontière |

| 6 December 2014 | AS Saint-Priest (4) | 1–0 | Étoile Fréjus Saint-Raphaël (3) | Saint-Priest |
| 18:00 | Bardine 20' | | | Stadium: Stade Jacques Joly |

| 6 December 2014 | SO Cholet (5) | 3–0 | Aurillac FCA (5) | Cholet |
| 18:00 | Diop 34'; Blouen 65'; Montero 90+3' | | | Stadium: Stade Pierre Blouen; Attendance: 700; Referee: Gaetan Bruno Fouquet |

| 6 December 2014 | Stade Brestois 29 (2) | 0–0 (a.e.t.) (4–3 p) | Paris FC (3) | Brest |
| 18:00 | | | | Stadium: Stade Francis-Le Blé; Attendance: 3,958; Referee: Yohann Rouinsard |
| | Penalties |
| | Grougi (penalty scored); Moimbé (penalty scored); Ramaré (penalty scored); Laborde (penalty missed); Khaled (penalty scored) | | Chevalier (penalty scored); Keita (penalty scored); Baldé (penalty scored); Gamiette (penalty missed); Ogunbiyi (penalty missed) |

| 6 December 2014 | Tarbes PF (4) | 0–1 | LB Châteauroux (2) | Tarbes |
| 18:00 | | | Kamara 58' | Stadium: Stade Maurice Trélut; Attendance: 1,300; Referee: Jeremy Stinat |

| 6 December 2014 | Troyes AC (2) | 1–3 | AS Nancy (2) | Troyes |
| 18:00 | Azamoum 2' | | Karaboué 25', 41'; Hadji 38' | Stadium: Stade de l'Aube; Attendance: 3,938; Referee: Stéphane Lannoy |

| 6 December 2014 | FC Bressuire (5) | 2–1 (a.e.t.) | FC Istres (3) | Bressuire |
| 18:30 | Girault 48' (pen.); Brebion 116' | | Lambert 43' | Stadium: Stade Alain Métayer |

| 6 December 2014 | Vendée Luçon Football (3) | 1–0 | Trélissac FC (4) | Luçon |
| 18:30 | N'Doye 24' | | | Stadium: Stade Jean de Mouzon |

| 6 December 2014 | US Concarneau (4) | 3–2 | AS Vitré (4) | Concarneau |
| 18:30 | Koré 13'; Gourmelon 46'; Jannez 81' | | Laurent 30', 60' | Stadium: Stade Guy Piriou |

| 6 December 2014 | Voltigeurs de Châteaubriant (5) | 1–2 | Stade Lavallois (2) | Châteaubriant |
| 19:00 | Danso 76' | | Guirassy 16'; Saïd 50' | Stadium: Stade de la Ville en Bois |

| 6 December 2014 | US Laon (5) | 0–7 | US Orléans (2) | Laon |
| 19:30 | | | Mendy 16', 90'; Tomas 37'; Maah 40', 45'; Seidou 55'; Elissalde 81' | Stadium: Complexe sportif Levindrey |

| 6 December 2014 | US Matoury (French Guiana) | 0–1 | US Avranches (3) | Remire-Montjoly |
| 21:00 | | | Herauville 55' (pen.) | Stadium: Stade Municipal Dr. Edmard Lama |

| 7 December 2014 | AS Saint-Louisienne (Réunion) | 1–2 (a.e.t.) | US Quevilly (4) | Saint-Pierre |
| 13:00 | Visnelda 22' | | Colinet 33'; Sarr 110' | Stadium: Stade Michel Volnay |

| 7 December 2014 | AS Pagny-sur-Moselle (6) | 2–1 (a.e.t.) | CS Sedan Ardennes (4) |
| 13:45 |

| 7 December 2014 | ES Paulhan-Pézenas (6) | 1–2 (a.e.t.) | Grenoble Foot 38 (4) |
| 13:45 |

| 7 December 2014 | AF Bobigny (6) | 1–0 (a.e.t.) | Olympique Noisy-le-Sec (5) |
| 14:00 |

| 7 December 2014 | FA Illkirch Graffenstaden (7) | 1–4 | AS Yzeure (4) |
| 14:00 |

| 7 December 2014 | MOS-3 Rivières FC (7) | 1–6 | Dijon FCO (2) |
| 14:00 |

| 7 December 2014 | US Fleury Mérogis (4) | 0–1 (a.e.t.) | US Sarre-Union (4) |
| 14:00 |

| 7 December 2014 | CS Meaux (7) | 1–3 (a.e.t.) | Amiens SC (3) |
| 14:30 |

| 7 December 2014 | Ailly sur Somme FC (6) | 0–2 | Iris Club de Croix (4) |
| 14:30 |

| 7 December 2014 | Le Mans FC (5) | 2–1 | Fougères AGL (6) |
| 14:30 |

| 7 December 2014 | FC Loon-Plage (6) | 0–1 | US Saint-Omer (6) |
| 14:30 |

| 7 December 2014 | FC Martigues (4) | 1–1 (a.e.t.) (1–3 p) | GS Consolat (3) |
| 14:30 |

| 7 December 2014 | US Forbach (5) | 0–3 | Red Star F.C. (3) |
| 14:30 |

| 8 December 2014 | Sochaux (2) | 0–1 | Strasbourg (3) | Montbéliard |
| 20:45 | | | N'dour 9' | Stadium: Stade Auguste Bonal |

== Round of 64 ==
44 winners of the eighth round are joined by the 20 Ligue 1 teams.

| 3 January 2015 | Le Mans FC (5) | 1–3 | Tours FC (2) | Le Mans |
| 14:30 | Ibongo 71' | | Adnane 21'; Bergougnoux 35' (pen.); Ketkeophomphone 46' | Stadium: MMArena; Attendance: 5,000; Referee: Stéphanie Frappart |

| 3 January 2015 | Stade Brestois 29 (2) | 1–0 | Stade Lavallois (2) | Brest |
| 15:00 | Grougi 18' (pen.) | | | Stadium: Stade Francis-Le Blé; Referee: Amaury Delerue |

| 3 January 2015 | Red Star F.C. (3) | 2–1 | AC Arles-Avignon (2) | Saint-Ouen |
| 15:00 | Bouazza 47'; Belvito 65' | | Bennacer 26' | Stadium: Stade de Paris; Attendance: 2,385; Referee: Philippe Kalt |

| 3 January 2015 | AF Bobigny (6) | 0–3 | Evian (1) | Saint-Denis |
| 15:15 | | | Camus 68'; Nielsen 76'; Wass 90+3' | Stadium: Stade Auguste Delaune; Referee: Jean-Charles Cailleux |

| 3 January 2015 | US Lusitanos Saint-Maur (6) | 1–3 | Reims (1) | Créteil |
| 15:15 | Ayi 46' | | Diego 39'; Charbonnier 48' de Préville 57' | Stadium: Stade Dominique Duvauchelle; Referee: Alexandre Perreau Niel |

| 3 January 2015 | Nantes (1) | 4–0 | (Martinique) Club Franciscain | Nantes |
| 15:15 | Déaux 15'; Narcissot 32' (o.g.); Rongier 78'; Vizcarrondo 90+1' | | | Stadium: Stade de la Beaujoire; Referee: Olivier Thual |

| 3 January 2015 | US Boulogne (3) | 5–4 | US Sarre-Union (4) | Boulogne-sur-Mer |
| 16:00 | Mercier 32', 45+1', 45+4', 73'; Gbizie 52' | | Riff 47'; Belktati 62'; Hayef 66', 84' | Stadium: Stade de la Libération; Referee: Thomas Léonard |

| 3 January 2015 | Jura Sud Lavans (4) | 3–0 | FC Saint-Louis Neuweg (5) | Moirans-en-Montagne |
| 16:00 | Oliveri 5'; Mbaiam 70', 90' | | | Stadium: Stade Municipal de Moirans; Referee: Didier Falcone |

| 3 January 2015 | ASF Andrézieux (5) | 2–0 | AS Saint-Priest (4) | Andrézieux-Bouthéon |
| 17:00 | Causevic 86'; Mangara 90+1' | | | Stadium: Stade Roger Baudras; Referee: Florent Batta |

| 3 January 2015 | Valenciennes (2) | 2–0 | Nice (1) | Valenciennes |
| 18:00 | Coulibaly 11'; Poepon 44' | | | Stadium: Stade du Hainaut; Referee: Benoît Bastien |

| 3 January 2015 | US Avranches (3) | 1–0 | Lorient (1) | Avranches |
| 18:00 | Niakaté 59' | | | Stadium: Stade René Fenouillère; Referee: Stéphane Jochem |

| 3 January 2015 | Le Poiré (3) | 3–1 | Stade Plabennecois (4) | Le Poiré-sur-Vie |
| 18:00 | Das Neves 80' (pen.); Sarr 83', 89' | | Bellec 28' | Stadium: Stade de l'Idonnière; Referee: Sylvain Palhies |

| 3 January 2015 | FC Bressuire (5) | 2–1 | Amiens SC (3) | Bressuire |
| 18:00 | Gireault 25', 30' | | Nsamé 8' | Stadium: Stade Alain Metayer; Referee: Olivier Husset |

| 3 January 2015 | Vendée Luçon Football (3) | 0–1 | LB Châteauroux (2) | Luçon |
| 18:30 | | | Plessis 58' | Stadium: Stade Jean de Mouzon; Referee: Johann Hamel |

| 3 January 2015 | US Concarneau (4) | 1–0 | Chamois Niortais F.C. (2) | Concarneau |
| 18:30 | Koré 27' | | | Stadium: Stade Guy Piriou; Referee: Yohann Rouinsard |

| 3 January 2015 | US Quevilly (4) | 3–3 (5–3 p) | US Orléans (2) | Le Petit-Quevilly |
| 19:00 | Géran 1', 21'; Sarr 13' | | Louisy-Daniel 45+2', 62'; Puyo 66' | Stadium: Stade Amable Lozai; Referee: Hamid Guenaoui |
| | Penalties |
| | Mortoire (penalty scored); Archimbaud (penalty scored); Colinet (penalty scored); Steppé (penalty scored); Sarr (penalty scored) | | Tomas (penalty missed); Puyo (penalty scored); Benmeziane (penalty scored); Loriot (penalty scored) |

| 3 January 2015 | US Saint-Omer (6) | 0–5 | Iris Club de Croix (4) | Saint-Omer |
| 19:00 | | | De Araujo 20'; Lorthiois 43'; Bekhechi 68', 84'; Oumedjeber 80' | Stadium: Stade Gaston Bonnet; Referee: Emmanuel Caron |

| 3 January 2015 | Bastia (1) | 2–0 | Lille (1) | Bastia |
| 20:45 | Ayité 5', 24' | | | Stadium: Stade Armand Cesari; Referee: Wilfried Bien |

| 4 January 2015 | SAS Épinal (3) | 1–2 | Metz (1) | Épinal |
| 13:45 | Touati 11' | | Milán 15'; N'Daw 53' | Stadium: Stade de la Colombière; Referee: Frank Schneider |

| 4 January 2015 | AS Pagny-sur-Moselle (6) | 1–3 | AS Yzeure (4) | Blénod-lès-Pont-à-Mousson |
| 13:45 | Hernandez 85' | | Sohier 36'; Chastan 59', 68' | Stadium: Stade des Fonderies; Referee: Aurélien Petit |

| 4 January 2015 | Nîmes Olympique (2) | 0–2 | Monaco (1) | Nimes |
| 14:15 | | | Silva 33'; Germain 90+5' | Stadium: Stade des Costieres; Referee: Alexandre Castro |

| 4 January 2015 | Lens (1) | 2–3 | Lyon (1) | Calais |
| 14:15 | El Jadeyaoui 75' (pen.); Coulibaly 89' | | Fekir 5'; Lacazette 14' (pen.); Dabo 30' | Stadium: Stade de l'Épopée; Referee: Fredy Fautrel |

| 4 January 2015 | AS Beauvais Oise (4) | 0–0 (5–6 p) | SO Cholet (5) | Beauvais |
| 14:30 | | | | Stadium: Stade Pierre Brisson; Referee: François Letexier |
| | Penalties |
| | Soadrine (penalty missed); N'Diaye (penalty scored); Sanganté (penalty scored); Sidibé (penalty missed); Benaries (penalty scored); Modeste (penalty missed); Sissoko (penalty scored); Le Picard (penalty scored); Vaury (penalty missed) | | Berdier (penalty missed); Diop (penalty scored); Lemetayer (penalty scored); Raud (penalty scored); Ebou-Yede (penalty missed); Riga (penalty missed); Martin (penalty missed); Simon (penalty scored); Ndoye (penalty scored); Vespuce (penalty scored) |

| 4 January 2015 | USL Dunkerque (3) | 1–2 | Rennes (1) | Dunkirk |
| 15:00 | Aabiza 3' | | Doucouré 2', 27' | Stadium: Stade Marcel-Tribut; Referee: Benoît Millot |

| 4 January 2015 | GS Consolat (3) | 3–0 | Ajaccio (2) | Marseille |
| 14:15 | Diawara 35'; Amiri 42'; Gigliotti 80' | | | Stadium: Stade de la Martine; Referee: Saïd Ennjimi |

| 4 January 2015 | AJ Auxerre (2) | 1–0 | Strasbourg (3) | Auxerre |
| 15:00 | Gragnic 45' | | | Stadium: Stade de l'Abbé Deschamps; Referee: William Lavis |

| 4 January 2015 | Bordeaux (1) | 2–1 | Toulouse (1) | Bordeaux |
| 14:15 | Touré 10' (pen.); Traoré 71' | | Ben Yedder 84' (pen.) | Stadium: Stade Chaban-Delmas; Referee: Lionel Jaffredo |

| 4 January 2015 | Saint-Étienne (1) | 1–0 (a.e.t.) | AS Nancy (2) | Saint-Étienne |
| 14:15 | Tabanou 97' | | | Stadium: Stade Geoffroy-Guichard; Referee: Clément Turpin |

| 4 January 2015 | Dinan-Léhon FC (5) | 0–3 | Guingamp (1) | Guingamp |
| 14:15 | | | Beauvue 51', 64'; Pied 81' | Stadium: Stade du Roudourou; Referee: Bartolomeu Varela |

| 4 January 2015 | Caen (1) | 2–3 (a.e.t.) | Dijon FCO (2) | Caen |
| 17:45 | Kanté 17'; Adéoti 45' | | Diallo 38'; Diony 80'; Mollet 105' | Stadium: Stade Michel d'Ornano; Referee: Ruddy Buquet |

| 4 January 2015 | Grenoble Foot 38 (4) | 3–3 (5–4 p) | Marseille (1) | Grenoble |
| 20:45 | Nasrallah 10'; Hachi 48'; Bengriba 120+1' | | Gignac 6', 33'; Ayew 98' | Stadium: Stade des Alpes; Referee: Sébastien Moreira |
| | Penalties |
| | Giraudon (penalty scored); Jouffreau (penalty scored); Akrour (penalty scored); Tchenkoua (penalty scored); Nasrallah (penalty scored) | | (penalty scored) Ayew; (penalty scored) Batshuayi; (penalty scored) Payet; (penalty missed) Thauvin; (penalty scored) Imbula |

| 5 January 2015 | Montpellier (1) | 0–3 | Paris Saint-Germain (1) | Montpellier |
| 20:45 | | | Chantôme 63'; Ibrahimović 79'; Lucas 90+1' | Stadium: Altrad Stadium; Attendance: 18,000; Referee: Sébastien Desiage |

== Round of 32 ==
| 20 January 2015 | US Avranches (3) | 0–3 (a.e.t.) | Metz (1) | Avranches |
| 18:30 | | | N'Daw 94'; Sarr 96'; Schur 115' (o.g.) | Stadium: Stade René Fenouillière; Referee: Antony Gautier |

| 20 January 2015 | US Quevilly (4) | 1–1 (a.e.t.) (3–1 p) | Bastia (1) | Le Petit-Quevilly |
| 18:30 | Sarr 115' | | Cissé 107' | Stadium: Stade Robert Diochon; Referee: Ruddy Buquet |
| | Penalties |
| | Firmin (penalty missed); Ouahbi (penalty scored); Colinet (penalty scored); Beaugrard (penalty scored) | | (penalty missed) Romaric; (penalty missed) Djiku; (penalty scored) Vincent; (penalty missed) Peybernes |

| 20 January 2015 | ASF Andrézieux (5) | 1–2 | Iris Club de Croix (4) | Andrézieux-Bouthéon |
| 19:00 | Frossard 39' | | Bekhechi 31'; Hassani 89' | Stadium: Stade Roger Baudras; Referee: Sébastien Moreira |

| 20 January 2015 | Jura Sud Lavans (4) | 0–1 | Auxerre (2) | Moirans-en-Montagne |
| 19:00 | | | Kılıç 36' | Stadium: Stade Municipal de Moirans; Referee: Philippe Kalt |

| 20 January 2015 | US Concarneau (4) | 1–0 (a.e.t.) | Dijon FCO (2) | Concarneau |
| 19:30 | Gourmelon 105' | | | Stadium: Stade Guy Piriou; Referee: Mikael Lesage |

| 20 January 2015 | AS Yzeure (4) | 2–0 | Valenciennes (2) | Yzeure |
| 19:30 | Jous 27' (pen.); Rousseau 46' | | | Stadium: Stade de Bellevue; Referee: Alexandre Castro |

| 20 January 2015 | Nantes (1) | 3–2 | Lyon (1) | Nantes |
| 21:00 | Bessat 19', 21', 89' | | Lacazette 5'; Fekir 59' | Stadium: Stade de la Beaujoire; Referee: Lionel Jaffredo |

| 21 January 2015 | Monaco (1) | 2–0 | Evian (1) | Monaco |
| 17:00 | Ocampos 63'; Martial 88' | | | Stadium: Stade Louis II; Referee: Clément Turpin |

| 21 January 2015 | Tours FC (2) | 3–5 (a.e.t.) | Saint-Etienne (1) | Tours |
| 19:00 | Sall 11' (o.g.); Adnane 75'; Bergougnoux 80' (pen.) | | Monnet-Paquet 64', 118'; Van Wolfswinkel 71', 73'; Erdinç 105' | Stadium: Stade de la Vallée du Cher; Referee: Nicolas Rainville |

| 21 January 2015 | US Boulogne (3) | 1–0 | Grenoble Foot 38 (4) | Boulogne-sur-Mer |
| 19:00 | Bègue 3' | | | Stadium: Stade de la Libération; Referee: Frank Schneider |

| 21 January 2015 | Guingamp (1) | 2–0 | LB Chateauroux (2) | Guingamp |
| 19:00 | Beauvue 61'; Giresse 90+3' (pen.) | | | Stadium: Stade du Roudourou; Referee: Fredy Fautrel |

| 21 January 2015 | SO Cholet (5) | 1–3 (a.e.t.) | Stade Brestois 29 (2) | Cholet |
| 20:00 | N'Doye 90+4' | | Laborde 27', 118'; Belghazouani 120' | Stadium: Stade Pierre Blouen; Referee: Saïd Ennjimi |

| 21 January 2015 | FC Bressuire (5) | 0–1 (a.e.t.) | Le Poiré (3) | Bressuire |
| 20:00 | | | Fachan 110' | Stadium: Stade Alain Metayer; Referee: Bartolomeu Varela |

| 21 January 2015 | Paris Saint-Germain (1) | 2–1 | Bordeaux (1) | Paris |
| 21:00 | Cavani 13'; Pastore 32' | | Rolán 46' | Stadium: Parc des Princes; Attendance: 45,230; Referee: Benoît Bastien |

| 22 January 2015 | Rennes (1) | 1–1 (a.e.t.) (5–4 p) | Reims (1) | Rennes |
| 21:00 | Armand 29' (pen.) | | Kyei 70' | Stadium: Stade de la Route de Lorient; Referee: Sébastien Desiage |
| | Penalties |
| | Danzé (penalty scored); Fernandes (penalty scored); Habibou (penalty missed); Henrique (penalty scored); Armand (penalty missed); Doucouré (penalty scored); Konradsen (penalty scored) | | (penalty scored) Bourillon; (penalty scored) Charbonnier; (penalty scored) Courtet; (penalty missed) Kyei; (penalty missed) Devaux; (penalty scored) Conte; (penalty missed) Mfulu |

| 23 January 2015 | Red Star F.C. (3) | 2–0 | GS Consolat (3) | Saint-Ouen |
| 19:30 | Allegro 51'; Beziouen 86' (pen.) | | | Stadium: Stade de Paris; Referee: Wilfried Bien |

== Round of 16 ==
| 10 February 2015 | US Boulogne (3) | 2–0 | US Quevilly (4) | Boulogne-sur-Mer |
| 18:15 | Gbizié 28'; Gope-Fenepej 84' | | | Stadium: Stade de la Libération; Referee: Mikael Lesage |

| 10 February 2015 | Le Poiré (3) | 1–1 (a.e.t.) (5–6 p) | Auxerre (2) | Le Poiré-sur-Vie |
| 19:00 | Dufau 90+2' | | Nabab 56' | Stadium: Stade de l'Idonnière; Referee: Olivier Thual |

| 10 February 2015 | Iris Club de Croix (4) | 0–0 (a.e.t.) (1–4 p) | US Concarneau (4) | Croix, Nord |
| 19:30 | | | | Stadium: Stade Henri Seigneur; Referee: Frank Schneider |
| | Penalties |
| | Zmijak (penalty scored); Oumedjeber (penalty missed); Lorthiois (penalty missed) | | (penalty scored) Sinquin; (penalty scored) Gégousse; (penalty scored) Basset; (penalty scored) Gargam |

| 10 February 2015 | Red Star F.C. (3) | 1–2 | Saint-Etienne (1) | Paris |
| 21:00 | Bouazza 28' | | Van Wolfswinkel 18'; Cros 80' (o.g.) | Stadium: Stade Jean-Bouin; Referee: Philippe Kalt |

| 11 February 2015 | AS Yzeure (4) | 1–3 (a.e.t.) | Guingamp (1) | Yzeure |
| 17:00 | El Hajri 62' | | Mandanne 90+3', 97'; Pied 100' | Stadium: Stade de Bellevue; Referee: Wilfried Bien |

| 11 February 2015 | Monaco (1) | 3–1 | Rennes (1) | Monaco |
| 19:05 | Touré 9'; Wallace 11'; Martial 67' (pen.) | | Pedro Henrique 34' | Stadium: Stade Louis II; Referee: Tony Chapron |

| 11 February 2015 | Paris Saint-Germain (1) | 2–0 | Nantes (1) | Paris |
| 21:00 | Cavani 18'; Cabaye 34' | | | Stadium: Parc des Princes; Attendance: 45,330; Referee: Stéphane Lannoy |

| 12 February 2015 | Metz (1) | 0–0 (a.e.t.) (3–4 p) | Stade Brestois 29 (2) | Metz |
| 19:45 | | | | Stadium: Stade Saint-Symphorien; Referee: Amaury Delerue |
| | Penalties |
| | Falcón (penalty scored); Kashi (penalty scored); Marchal (penalty missed); Lejeune (penalty scored); Choplin (penalty missed) | | (penalty scored) Pelé; (penalty scored) Courtet; (penalty missed) Moimbé; (penalty scored) Ramaré; (penalty scored) Khaled |

== Quarter-finals ==
| 3 March 2015 | US Boulogne (3) | 1–1 (a.e.t.) (3–4 p) | Saint-Étienne (1) | Boulogne-sur-Mer |
| 21:00 | Soubervie 80' (pen.) | | Corgnet 85' | Stadium: Stade de la Libération; Referee: Frédy Fautrel |
| | Penalties |
| | Soubervie (penalty scored); Rolland (penalty scored); Jacques (penalty scored); Dia (penalty missed); Mercier (penalty missed) | | Mollo (penalty scored); Perrin (penalty missed); Erdinç (penalty scored); Monnet-Paquet (penalty scored); Clerc (penalty scored) |

| 4 March 2015 | Paris Saint-Germain (1) | 2–0 | Monaco (1) | Paris |
| 21:00 | David Luiz 3'; Cavani 52' | | | Stadium: Parc des Princes; Referee: Clément Turpin |

| 5 March 2015 | Stade Brestois 29 (2) | 0–0 (a.e.t.) (2–4 p) | Auxerre (2) | Brest |
| 19:00 | | | | Stadium: Stade Francis-Le Blé |
| | Penalties |
| | Adnane (penalty missed); Cuvillier (penalty scored); Courtet (penalty scored); Falette (penalty missed) | | (penalty scored) Gragnic; (penalty scored) Puygrenier; (penalty missed) Fontaine; (penalty scored) Mulumba; (penalty scored) Sammaritano |

| 5 March 2015 | US Concarneau (4) | 1–2 | Guingamp (1) | Concarneau |
| 21:00 | Gourmelon 22' | | Mandanne 3'; Beauvue 90+2' | Stadium: Stade Guy Piriou |

== Semi-finals ==
Matches were played on 7–8 April 2015.

| 7 April 2015 | Auxerre (2) | 1–0 | Guingamp (1) | Auxerre |
| | Sammaritano 15' | | | Stadium: Stade de l'Abbé Deschamps; Referee: Benoît Millot |

| 8 April 2015 | Paris Saint-Germain (1) | 4–1 | Saint-Étienne (1) | Paris |
| | Ibrahimović 21' (pen.), 81', 90+2'; Lavezzi 60' | | Hamouma 25' | Stadium: Parc des Princes; Referee: Fredy Fautrel |

== Final ==
The 2015 Coupe de France final was played on 30 May 2015 between Auxerre, from Ligue 2; and Paris Saint-Germain, from Ligue 1.

30 May 2015
21:00 CEST

| Auxerre | 0–1 | Paris Saint-Germain |
|---|---|---|
| | Report | Cavani 64' |

Stade de France, Paris
Attendance: 80,000
Referee: Antony Gautier
