= 2009–10 Coupe de France 2nd round =

The 2009–10 Coupe de France is the 93rd season of the French most prestigious cup competition, organized by the French Football Federation, and is open to all clubs in French football, as well as clubs from the overseas departments and territories (Guadeloupe, French Guiana, Martinique, Mayotte, New Caledonia, French Polynesia, and Réunion). All of the teams that enter the competition, but were not members of Ligue 1 or Ligue 2, have to compete in the regional qualifying rounds. The regional qualifying rounds determine the number of regional clubs that will earn spots in the 7th round and normally lasts six rounds.

See Coupe de France 2009–10 for details of the rounds from the 7th Round onwards.

== Calendar ==
On 23 June 2009, the French Football Federation announced the calendar for the Coupe de France.

Round	First match date	Fixtures	Clubs	Notes
1st Round	20 August 2009			
2nd Round	6 September 2009			

All times in the following tables are CET unless otherwise noted.

== Second round ==
=== Alsace ===
Date	Kick Off	Home	Result	Away

=== Aquitaine ===
Date	Kick Off	Home	Result	Away
5 September	17:00	Stade Saint Medardais	0–2	EJ Saint Medard
5 September	18:00	Hendaye Eglantins	1–2	JA Dax
5 September	19:00	AV Mourenxois	2–1 a.e.t	AS Artix
5 September	20:00	Arin Luzien	0–1	Bayonne Cr.
5 September	20:30	Boucau Elan	3–0	FC La Teste
6 September	15:00	Seignosse FC	0–1	AS Pontonx
6 September	15:00	ES Boulazac	0–3	Marmande FC
6 September	15:00	3 Vallee Cours Pile FC	2–3	Saint Andre Cubzac
6 September	15:00	Pays-de-Thonon FC	2–3 a.e.t	FC Gironde Reole
6 September	15:00	US Gontaud	0–3	JC Saint Seurin
6 September	15:00	US Izon	4–0	US Coutras
6 September	15:00	Villeneuve-sur-Lot	2–0	Entente Boe-bon-Encon
6 September	15:00	JS Corgnac	1–3	Sarlat Marcillac FC
6 September	15:00	Monbazillac Sigoules	1–4	Coulounieix Chamier
6 September	15:00	Casseneuil Av. F.	0–1	Razac Isle
6 September	15:00	Lamothe Mongauz	0–2	FC Montpon. Menesplet
6 September	15:00	Chateau L'Eveque	1–2	Antonne-le-Change
6 September	15:00	Limens FC	1–2	JS Saint Emilion
6 September	15:00	Agen FC	1–0	Tonneins FC
6 September	15:00	Entente Merignac Arlac	6–1	RD Cenon
6 September	15:00	Mouliets Cotes Cast.	0–0; 1 – 3 pen.	Vallee Gamage FC
6 September	15:00	ASSA Pays-du-Dropt	0–1	Langon Castet
6 September	15:00	RC La Laurence	0–3	Prigonrieux FC
6 September	15:00	Coteaux Libournais	4–2	Saint Aulaye Sports
6 September	15:00	Pays-de-Montaigne	3–4	Saint Sulpice Cameyrac
6 September	15:00	Saint Med Mussidan	1–2 a.e.t	ES Ambaresienne
6 September	15:00	CA Riberac	4–1	SAG Cestas
6 September	15:00	Petit Bersac FC	1–0	AS Nontron
6 September	15:00	RC Chambéry	5–1	Parentis FC
6 September	15:00	Saint Pierre-du-Mont	1–0	CS Lantonnais
6 September	15:00	FA Pau Bourbaki	1–3	Entente Blanquefort
6 September	15:00	Facture Biganos	2–1 a.e.t	Saint Symphorien
6 September	15:00	Hourtin Naujac FC	0–1	US Talence
6 September	15:00	Coqs Rouges Bx	0–3	Arsac Le Pian
6 September	15:00	JS Le Teich	0–2	US Lege Capferret
6 September	15:00	SC Ares	1–4	Pierroton Cestas
6 September	15:00	Hagetmau FC	0–2	Olympique Biscarrosse
6 September	15:00	SC Cudos	4–2 a.e.t	Bayonne Portugais
6 September	15:00	Gan FC	3–0	Meillon Assat Narc
6 September	15:00	Saint Paul Sports	0–1	J. Villenave
6 September	15:00	Lons FC	1–2	JA Biarritz
6 September	15:00	ES Canejan	4–2	Olympique Cerons
6 September	15:00	Pau Bleuets	3–1	Olympique Cazaux
6 September	15:00	Doazit FC	5–2	US Roquefort
6 September	15:00	Olympique Pardies	2–0	Luy-de-Béarn FC
6 September	15:00	Croises Béarn	3–1	US Fargues
6 September	15:00	Le Barp FC	4–0	Casteljaloux FC
6 September	15:00	AS Tarnos	4–0	Bazas Patronage
6 September	15:00	La Ribere FC	2–0	ASMUR
6 September	15:00	Hasparren FC	3–0	EB Orthez
6 September	15:00	SC SCALA	1–4	Sporting Andernos
6 September	15:00	Stade Ygossais	1–3	Oloron FC
6 September	15:00	Creonnais Cr.	0–3	US Lormont
6 September	15:00	FC Coteaux Bordelais	0–2	Portes Entre 2 Mers
6 September	15:00	Landes Girondines	1–1; 4 – 5 pen.	AS Le Taillan
6 September	15:00	AGJA Cauderan	4–1	Saint Vincent-de-Paul
6 September	15:00	SC Cadaujac	0–1	Estuaire Haute Gironde
6 September	15:00	Saint Bruno Union	0–2	US Pointe-du-Medoc
6 September	15:00	RC Podensac	2–2; 5 – 6 pen.	Illac Martignas
6 September	15:00	US Martillac	1–2	ASC Pessac Alouette
6 September	15:00	CA Begles	1–3	US Labrede
6 September	15:00	CMO Bassens	2–5	RC Bordeaux
6 September	15:00	AC Bordeaux	1–2 a.e.t	SJ Macau

=== Atlantique ===
Date	Kick Off	Home	Result	Away
5 September	15:30	US Varades	0–2	RC Ancenis 44
6 September	15:00	ASPTT Angers	0–2	Andreze Jub-Jallais
6 September	15:00	AS Saumur Bayard	2–1	Pellouailles Corze
6 September	15:00	CBOS Anges	1–4 a.e.t	Beaufort-en-Vallee
6 September	15:00	ES Layo Martign.	2–1 a.e.t	USSCA Champtoce
6 September	15:00	NDC Angers	3–1	AS Tierce Cheffres
6 September	15:00	ES Varennes Villeber	0–4	FE Trelaze
6 September	15:00	ASVR Ambillou	2–4 a.e.t	Somloire Cerqueux
6 September	15:00	SC Angers Doutre	3–2 a.e.t	Sainte-Gemmes Andigne
6 September	15:00	CA Chalonnes	4–3 a.e.t	Saint Gereon Reveil
6 September	15:00	Saumur Portugais	0–3	Angers Vaillante Sports
6 September	15:00	Les Rosiers Gennes	4–0	Le Louroux Becon
6 September	15:00	US Maze	2–4	Bouchemaine
6 September	15:00	Angers Monpl. Aisir	1–3 a.e.t	AC Longue
6 September	15:00	ES Brissac Aubance	5–0	Mazieres-en-Mauges
6 September	15:00	Villeveque Souc FC	1–3	Saint Martin Avire Louv
6 September	15:00	Saint Florent Le Vieil	0–2	Trelaze Eglantine
6 September	15:00	FC Cholet Portugais	2–4	Angers Lac-de-Maine
6 September	15:00	OS Saint Melaine	1–1; 5 – 4 pen.	Montreuil Juig. Bene
6 September	15:00	FC Chatelais	0–1	Angers Intrepid
6 September	15:00	OS Nozay	2–1 a.e.t	USA Pouance
6 September	15:00	Erbray Jeunes	1–1; 4 – 3 pen.	ES La Poueze
6 September	15:00	Chaille Marai	1–4	Moullier En P
6 September	15:00	Benet Damvix Maille	0–0; 5 – 6 pen.	Saint Aubin La Plaine
6 September	15:00	ES L'Ile D'Elle	0–4	La Tranche Cote Lum
6 September	15:00	US Vouvant Bourneau	1–3 a.e.t	AC Pouzauges
6 September	15:00	Cheff. Saint Maur	4–0	Hermenault Serigne
6 September	15:00	US Grues	1–6	FCJA Jard Avrille
6 September	15:00	ES Longevillaise	0–4	Bretignolle Marsouin
6 September	15:00	Esperance Nalliers Foot 85	2–1	Autize Saint Hilaire
6 September	15:00	US Champ Saint Pere	0–3	FC La Tardiere Pierr
6 September	15:00	ASMA Moutiers	0–4	FCG Les Essarts
6 September	15:00	FC Talmont Saint Hilaire	2–2; 3 – 5 pen.	La Roche-sur-Yon Robret
6 September	15:00	Chat. Olonne	0–5	Aizenay Fran.
6 September	15:00	ES Grosbreuil	4–1	FC Noirmoutier
6 September	15:00	ECPM Saint Jean Monts	0–3	FC La Mothe Achard
6 September	15:00	Olympique Coex	2–0	US La Ferriere
6 September	15:00	'ASR Machecoul	2–0	AFC Bouin Bois Cene
6 September	15:00	Jeanne D'Arc de Nesm	0–3	JF Saint Prouant
6 September	15:00	ES Les Pineaux Saint Ouen	4–4; 2 – 4	Saint Fulgent La Vigil
6 September	15:00	AB Beignon Basset	0–4	RS Ardelay
6 September	15:00	La Roche-sur-Yon Generau	3–2	US Saint Etienne Pall.
6 September	15:00	SA Saint Florent	0–4	La Flocelli Chamon
6 September	15:00	Boulogne-Merla	1–3	AS Bouffere
6 September	15:00	FC Saint Julien Vaire	1–0	LSG Brouzils
6 September	15:00	CP Asserac	1–11	OS Saint Nazaire
6 September	15:00	ESM Piriac Turbal	1–0	UMP Saint Nazaire
6 September	15:00	AOS Pontchateau	0–6	Stade Saint Nazaire
6 September	15:00	JA Besne	0–1 a.e.t	Amicale Saint Dolay
6 September	15:00	Guerande Saint Aubin	3–1 a.e.t	ES Dresny Plesse
6 September	15:00	CSM Montoir Bret.	3–5	ES Blain
6 September	15:00	SS Bouvron	0–5	Saint Andre des Eaux
6 September	15:00	Esperance Crossac	1–2	Saint Pere de Retz
6 September	15:00	FC Saint Nazaire Imma.	1–0 a.e.t	Saint Malo Guersac
6 September	15:00	Stade Le Croisic	1–2	Le Baule Pouliguen
6 September	15:00	FC Donges	4–0	ES Vigneux
6 September	15:00	Pornic Foot	1–3	Saint Joachim Briere
6 September	15:00	Chauve Eclair	1–2	Herbig. Saint Cyr
6 September	15:00	FC Saint Etienne Montlucon	0–3	Saint Marc-sur-Mer Foot
6 September	15:00	AS Sion-les-Mines	2–4	US Soudan
6 September	15:00	AL Chateaubriant	1–2 a.e.t	AC Nort-sur-Erdre
6 September	15:00	US Isse	0–4	AC La Chapelle Chapelain
6 September	15:00	FC Heric	4–1	Laurentais Landem
6 September	15:00	Orvault Bugalliere	3–4 a.e.t	US Le Pellerin
6 September	15:00	FC Petit Mars	2–4 a.e.t	RC Orvault
6 September	15:00	Mauves Saint Denis	0–6	UF Saint Herblain
6 September	15:00	FC Logne Boulogne	1–3	FC Brains Boiseau
6 September	15:00	JSC Bellevue Nantes	2–2; 0 – 3 pen.	Saint Andre Marche
6 September	15:00	Sporting Commequiers	1–3	Belleville-sur-Vie
6 September	15:00	FC Saligny	2–3	Les Lucs-sur-Boulogne
6 September	15:00	'Chavagnes Rabatel	2–0	Boussay Saint Sebastien
6 September	15:00	Etoile Mouzillon	0–1	Sporting La Guyonniere
6 September	15:00	CLB Rocheserviere	2–1	Gorges Elan
6 September	15:00	Les Landes Genusson	3–1	Saint Macaire Mauges
6 September	15:00	SM Treize Septiers	1–9	ES Yzernay
6 September	15:00	AF Trementines	5–1	Saint Malo Saint Laurent
6 September	15:00	Le May-sur-Evre	0–3	AS La Bruffie Defont
6 September	15:00	ASPTT Nantes	1–3	ARC Tillieres
6 September	15:00	AS Cellier	0–6	Nantes Mellinet
6 September	15:00	ASE Montbert	1–6	FC Saint Hilaire Retz
6 September	15:00	Saint Germain Val Moine	5–2	Basse Indre
6 September	15:00	US Chateau-Thebaud	2–2; 2 – 4 pen.	Etoile Clisson
6 September	15:00	AS Avrille	1–2	FC Belligne Saint Sauvier
6 September	15:00	Saint Aubin Chat	0–7	SC Beaucouzé
6 September	15:00	Landreau Loroux OSC	2–3	ASI Murs Erigne
6 September	15:00	SM La Meignanne	1–5	Saint Pierre Montrevau
6 September	15:00	SS La Membrolle	0–3	Saint Julien de C.
6 September	15:00	Nyoiseau Bouille	0–1	US Thouare
6 September	15:00	US Combre Noyant	0–2	FC Beaupreau
6 September	15:00	Nantes Metal Sports	5–1	ES Seguiniere
6 September	15:00	Le Puy Saint Bonnet	0–2 a.e.t	Vieillevigne Espoir
6 September	15:00	AC Basse Goulaine	0–2	FC Saint Hilaire Retz
6 September	15:00	FC Fief Geste	1–2	US Pont Saint Martin
6 September	15:00	Geneston Sud Loire	1–3 a.e.t	JA Maulevrier
6 September	15:00	Nantes Saint Felix	4–1 a.e.t	Villedieu Renaud.
6 September	15:00	Maisdon Sevre Maine	6–5	ASPTT Cholet Caeb
6 September	15:00	ES Haute-Goulaine	2–1	Saint Christophe Bois
6 September	15:00	US La Chaussaire	4–4; 5 – 4 pen.	Bouaye FC
6 September	15:00	Bouzille Marillais	0–3	La Chevroliere Herb.
6 September	15:00	Olympique Lire Drain	4–1 a.e.t	ASV Monnieres Pallet

=== Auvergne ===
Date	Kick Off	Home	Result	Away
5 September	18:00	AS Enval	2–3	Esperance Ceyrat
5 September	19:00	SC Gannat	2–1	SCA Cusset
5 September	19:00	Charb-Paugnat	1–5	Perignat-Sarlieve
5 September	19:00	AS Chassenard Luneau	0–2	AA Lapalisse
5 September	20:00	CS Arpajon	5–5; 3 – 4 pen.	Junhac-Montsalvy
5 September	20:00	SAUV Brives	0–5	US Blavozy
5 September	20:00	Rochefort Laqueuille	1–2	Sporting Cebezat
5 September	20:00	CS Pont-du-Chateau	4–2 a.e.t	US Saint Beauzire
6 September	15:00	ES Bressolles	0–5	Billy-Crechy
6 September	15:00	Beaulon Bal.	0–3	AS Varennes
6 September	15:00	AS Trevol	2–1	US Jeunes de Mayotte
6 September	15:00	CS Thiel-Acolin	1–12	Entente Moulins Yzeure
6 September	15:00	AS Cerilly	2–4	Lignerolles Lavault
6 September	15:00	AS Premilhat	0–6	Montlucon Ilets
6 September	15:00	AS Villebretoise	1–2	CS Cosne
6 September	15:00	Bellerive Mayotte FC	3–0	AS Neris
6 September	15:00	US Saint Victor	0–2	SC Saint Pourcain
6 September	15:00	Le V. Creuzier	1–2	Saint Germain Fosses
6 September	15:00	AS Saint Loup	2–5	US Abrest
6 September	15:00	AS Ferrieres	4–3	US Vendat
6 September	15:00	Bellerive Brugheas	2–4	Stade Saint Yorre
6 September	15:00	SC Avermes	1–4	Souvigny FC
6 September	15:00	AS Gennetines	3–1	AS Mercy-Chapeau
6 September	15:00	AS Montmarault	2–1	Montlucon-Bien A
6 September	15:00	UST Huriel	0–2	Saint Gervais Auvergne
6 September	15:00	Ytrac F.	2–3	FCE Chataigneraie
6 September	15:00	AS Saint Just	2–2; 5 – 4 pen.	AS Villedieu
6 September	15:00	ES Pierrefort	2–4	US Murat
6 September	15:00	US Carlat	1–6	AS Espinat
6 September	15:00	Moussages FC	2–3	US Crandelles
6 September	15:00	US Jussac	1–3	Entente Nord Lozere
6 September	15:00	FC Minier	2–4	Ally Mauriac
6 September	15:00	Haute Chataigne	1–5	US Marmanhac
6 September	15:00	AS Talizat	0–4	Massiac Molompize
6 September	15:00	CS Vezac	1–2	AS Sansac
6 September	15:00	Entente Saint Paul-Lac	3–0	Chaudesaigues
6 September	15:00	Entente Saint Maurice	1–1; 6 – 5 pen.	AS Polignac
6 September	15:00	CO Craponne	4–1	La Bastide Puy Laur
6 September	15:00	Saint Julien Chapteuil	2–1	Bas-en-Basset
6 September	15:00	Espaly FC	6–0	Le Puy Portugais
6 September	15:00	Vezezoux	2–1	Vergongheon
6 September	15:00	US Beaumont	5–0	Olby-Mazayes
6 September	15:00	Lezoux FC	3–1	US Issoire
6 September	15:00	SC Nebouzat	0–3	Chappes FF
6 September	15:00	Saint Amant-Tallende	1–3	Martres-de-Veyre
6 September	15:00	US Menat	0–4	CS Volvic
6 September	15:00	Plauzat-Champeix	4–5	FCUS Ambert
6 September	15:00	Celles-sur-Durolle	0–3	FA Cendre
6 September	15:00	SC Billom	1–2	Lempdes Sports
6 September	15:00	Clermont Ouvoimoja	1–0	AS Romagnat
6 September	15:00	US Orcet	5–0	Clermont du Fontaine
6 September	15:00	US Messeix	2–1	US Marsat
6 September	15:00	Chatel Guyon FC	4–3	Nord Combraille
6 September	15:00	Combelle Charb.	5–0	US Brioude
6 September	15:00	AS Orcines	1–3	Sporting Aulnat
6 September	15:00	ALS Besse	0–3	Haute Dordogne
6 September	15:00	Mezel FC	1–2	CS Pont-de-Dore

=== Basse-Normandie ===
Date	Kick Off	Home	Result	Away
29 August	17:00	FC Landais	0–2	S. Saint Georges Domf.
29 August	19:00	AST Deauville	0–2	SC Herouvillais
30 August	15:00	US Trevieres	1–5	RS Saint Sauverais
30 August	15:00	Creances Sports	6–0	ES des Marais
30 August	15:00	CA Pontois	5–1	E. Lorey Haut. Feug.
30 August	15:00	AS Querquevillaise	5–0	AJ Saint Hilaire PV
30 August	15:00	S. Urville Nacqueville	1–6	FC Equeurdr. Hainnev
30 August	15:00	AS Tourlaville	1–4	CS Carentanais
30 August	15:00	FC Digosville	1–4	ES Pointe Hague
30 August	15:00	Periers Sports	3–0	AS Pointe Cotentin
30 August	15:00	PL Octeville	0–4	Agneaux FC
30 August	15:00	US Saint Pairaise	0–0; 3 – 1 pen.	Tessy Moyon Sports
30 August	15:00	CS Villedieu	9–1	FC des Etangs
30 August	15:00	US Saint Quentin-sur-Homme	3–0	AS Sacey Tanis
30 August	15:00	Saint Hilaire Virey Lan	0–0; 3 – 4 pen.	US Ducey
30 August	15:00	US Saint Martin Champs	0–5	ES Coutances
30 August	15:00	ES Marcey les Greves	2–2; 1 – 3 pen.	La Brehalaise
30 August	15:00	AS Jullouville Sarti	2–6	US Granville
30 August	15:00	ES Trelly Quettre. CO	1–3	Conde Sports
30 August	15:00	Esperance Saint Jean Haize	0–4	FC Agon Coutainville
30 August	15:00	Athletic de Messei	2–3	AS Passais Saint Fraim
30 August	15:00	ASC Petruvienne	2–3	BT J. Fertoise
30 August	15:00	US Mortainaise	0–5	JS Flerienne
30 August	15:00	AS Potigny Villers US	1–4	CO Ceauce
30 August	15:00	JS de Tinchebray	0–2	ES Thury Harcourt
30 August	15:00	SL Vaudry	3–4	USCO Sourdeval
30 August	15:00	US Viller Bocage	0–5	FC Flers
30 August	15:00	US Aunay-sur-Odon	0–14	AF Virois
30 August	15:00	US Meloise	0–4	FC de Pays Aiglon
30 August	15:00	AS Courtelle Alençon	6–1	FC Ecouche
30 August	15:00	AS Merlerault Nonant	1–3	ES Forges Radon
30 August	15:00	Ved. de Boisthorel	0–2	CS Orbec
30 August	15:00	CS Pays Longny	2–3	Olympique Alençon
30 August	15:00	US Mortagnaise	1–3	ASPTT Argentan
30 August	15:00	AS Morteaux Fr. Me	2–8	UFC Argentan
30 August	15:00	AS de Villeneuve	0–4	FC Vimoutiers
30 August	15:00	AS la Hoguette	0–3	ESFC Falaise
30 August	15:00	Olympique Luon-sur-Mer	2–2; 9 – 10 pen.	Borguebus Sports
30 August	15:00	US Bellengreville CV	1–4	ES Airan Mery Corbon
30 August	15:00	ES Bonnesbosq	1–2	ASPTT Caen
30 August	15:00	Lystrienne Sportive	6–0	ES Moult
30 August	15:00	ES Estuaire Touques	Reserved	FC Fontaine Etoupef
30 August	15:00	AS Soliers	0–6	CA Lisieux PA
30 August	15:00	AS Villers BB	1–4	LC Bretteville-sur-Odon
30 August	15:00	NGS Ver-sur-Mer	1–10	OS Maladrerie
30 August	15:00	AM Turque Herouville	1–3	FC Bayeux
30 August	15:00	AFC Mouen	0–4	AJS Ouistreham
30 August	15:00	ES Livarotaise	1–5	ASC Lexoviens
30 August	15:00	AG Caennais	1–2	FC Bretteville-sur-Laize
30 August	15:00	US Authie	1–3	US Thaon FVM
30 August	15:00	US Pont le Eveque	1–0	AS de Vieux
30 August	15:00	US Creully	0–3	FC Argences
30 August	15:00	ES Carpiquet	0–3	RSG Courseulles
30 August	15:00	AS de Rots	1–0	AS Ifs
30 August	15:00	ES du Tronquay	0–2	ESI May-sur-Orne
30 August	15:00	AS Plain Contentin	0–1	AS Valognes

=== Bourgogne ===
Date	Kick Off	Home	Result	Away
5 September	15:00	Sud Loire Allier 09	0–5	US Cosne
6 September	15:00	US Coulanges Nevers	1–0	ASC Pouguoise
6 September	15:00	AS Veron Villeneuve	1–2	ES Saint Florentin
6 September	15:00	FC Chevannes	2–0	Paron Saint Clement
6 September	15:00	AS Garchizy	2–3 a.e.t	RC Nevers-Challuy
6 September	15:00	Amical Franco Portugais	0–5	US Cercucoise
6 September	15:00	ASUC Migennes	3–3; 1 – 3 pen.	SENS Franco-Maghreb
6 September	15:00	Inter Yonne Nord	1–3	US La Charite
6 September	15:00	Fontaine Les Dijon Foot	0–4	Cercle Marsannay
6 September	15:00	CSP Charmoy	0–1	FC Autun
6 September	15:00	Stade Auxerre	3–0	Benfica Autin Football
6 September	15:00	FC Saint Flor Port	0–8	CO Avallon
6 September	15:00	Chassignelles Ancy	0–3	Chatillon Colombine
6 September	15:00	FC Talent	2–6	Semur Epoisses
6 September	15:00	Fontaine Dijon Ouche	0–2	ES Appoigny
6 September	15:00	Saint Georges	4–1	AS Tonnerroise
6 September	15:00	FC Dijon Parc	2–1	FC Magny-sur-Tille
6 September	15:00	AS Cessey	1–0 a.e.t	Bresse Nord Intercom
6 September	15:00	AS Gevrey Chambert	1–4	Dijon USC
6 September	15:00	AS Ruffey	0–6	CS Auxonne
6 September	15:00	ULFE Dijon	2–3	US Meursault
6 September	15:00	FC Louhans	2–7	ES La Pontailler
6 September	15:00	CS De Ruffey	5–1 a.e.t	AS Genlis
6 September	15:00	AS Is-sur-Tille	1–3	ALC Longvic
6 September	15:00	CS Varennois	1–4	JS Creches
6 September	15:00	Aberg Cuisery SVLF	6–1	AS Sagy
6 September	15:00	CS Chateaurenaud	1–4	JS Maconnaise
6 September	15:00	Champforgeuil FC	1–3	FC Mercurey
6 September	15:00	JS Rully	2–3 a.e.t	ES Branges
6 September	15:00	SC Etang-Arroux	2–0	FC La Roche
6 September	15:00	US Cluny Football	0–2	AS Sornay
6 September	15:00	Foyer Leo Lagrange Ger	2–3	LR Chatenoy
6 September	15:00	US Crissey	2–0	ACF Chalon
6 September	15:00	Olympique Dornes Neuville	3–0	US Rigny
6 September	15:00	EJS Epinacoise	0–5	AS La Chapelle Guinchay
6 September	15:00	AS Ciry Le Noble	2–4	USC Paray
6 September	15:00	Melay Iguerande	0–2	US Bourbon
6 September	15:00	Dun Sornin Foot	2–1	US Saint Serninoise
6 September	15:00	RC Saint Vincent	0–2	JF Palinges
6 September	15:00	US Luzy Millay	3–2	FC Montcenis

=== Bretagne ===
Kick Off	Home	Result	Away

=== Centre ===
Date	Kick Off	Home	Result	Away
5 September	18:00	AS Gien	2–1 a.e.t	AS Saint-Amandoise
5 September	18:00	US Dampierre	0–4	US Saint-Pierre-des-Corps
5 September	19:00	FC Ouest Tourangeau	4–0	AS Montlouis
6 September	15:00	US Vendôme	2–2; 6 – 7 pen.	CA Ouzouer Le Marche
6 September	15:00	US Reuilly	0–0; 4 – 5 pen.	US Montgivray
6 September	15:00	AS Bourges Portugais	6–1	AC Loches
6 September	15:00	DR Selles Saint Denis	3–0	Nord Bourges Jeunes
6 September	15:00	AFM Blois	1–3	Vineuil Sports
6 September	15:00	AS Monts	3–0	AS Le Ripault
6 September	15:00	CS Beaugency Lusitanos	1–2	FC Saint-Jean-le-Blanc
6 September	15:00	US Selles-sur-Cher	3–2	Beaune La Rolande
6 September	15:00	FCM Ingre	1–1; 3 – 5 pen.	HB Chartres
6 September	15:00	FC Boigny	0–4	USM Olivet
6 September	15:00	FC2M Martizay	5–3	Chateauneuf-sur-Cher
6 September	15:00	AS Arthon	1–4	US Le Pechereau
6 September	15:00	AS Saint Lactencin	0–2	ES Bourges Moulon
6 September	15:00	Saint Benoit du Sault	1–3 a.e.t	US Aigurande
6 September	15:00	Parnac Val D'Abloux	2–3 a.e.t	Chateauroux Touv.
6 September	15:00	FC Levroux	1–4	ES Vineuil Brion
6 September	15:00	US Villedieu	3–1	ES Trouy
6 September	15:00	ASC Blois Portugais	1–2 a.e.t	AS Fondettes
6 September	15:00	CA Montrichard	0–1	SC Azay Cheille
6 September	15:00	AS Chailles Cande 99	0–1	CCS Tours Portugais
6 September	15:00	La Riche Tours	3–0	US Chinon Cinais
6 September	15:00	AS Contres	1–2	ES Veretz Larcay
6 September	15:00	SG Blere	1–8	Saint-Avertin Sports
6 September	15:00	US Joue Portugais	4–1	ES Bourgueil
6 September	15:00	EB Saint Cyr-sur-Loire	2–2; 4 – 3 pen.	Eglantine Vierzon
6 September	15:00	CA Saint Laurent Nouan	1–2	AS Salbris
6 September	15:00	SL Vierzon Chaillot	3–0	Chateauneuf-sur-Loire
6 September	15:00	AJS Mont-et-Bracieux	1–3	AS Chanceaux
6 September	15:00	US Lunery Rosieres	1–3	CSM Sully-sur-Loire
6 September	15:00	ES Bourges Justices	1–5	FC Saint Doulchard
6 September	15:00	SC Vatan	3–0	USS Orléans Portugais
6 September	15:00	SC Ares	1–4	Pierroton Cestas
6 September	15:00	US Saint Cyr-en-Val	3–1	FC Jargeau Saint Denis
6 September	15:00	ES Villebarou	1–0	US Mer
6 September	15:00	AY Saint Chaingy	1–5	OC Châteaudun
6 September	15:00	FC Saint Peravy Ormes	0–1 a.e.t	SMOC Saint Jean Braye
6 September	15:00	Esperance Tours Deportivo	1–2	ACSF Dreux
6 September	15:00	CS Mainvilliers	3–5 a.e.t	ESCALE Orléans
6 September	15:00	Amicale Gallardon	1–0	Athletic Ymonville
6 September	15:00	Amicale Épernon	1–0	ESF Maintenon
6 September	15:00	AS NOgent-le-Rotrou	1–2	Amicale Sours
6 September	15:00	AAAEE Artenay	0–6	AC Luisant
6 September	15:00	Pithiviers Le Vieil	0–2	Amicale de Lucé

=== Centre-Ouest ===
Kick Off	Home	Result	Away

=== Champagne-Ardenne ===
Kick Off	Home	Result	Away

=== Franche-Comté ===
Date	Kick Off	Home	Result	Away
5 September	16:30	Aiglepierre	1–0	Sud-Revermont
5 September	17:15	Saint Vit	2–1	ARC Gray
5 September	19:30	Levier	5–2 a.e.t	Besançon Clemencea
5 September	19:30	Coteaux de Seille	1–0	Olympique Montmorot
5 September	19:340	Jura Lacs Foot	4–1	AS Choisey
5 September	19:30	Le Isle-sur-Doubs	7–1	Exincourt Taillecourt
5 September	19:30	Saône Mamirolle	2–1	Pays Maichois
5 September	19:30	Frasne	2–0	Chateau de Joux
6 September	15:00	RC Chaux du Dombief	1–2	Champagnole
6 September	15:00	Dannemarie	4–1 a.e.t	Val-de-Loue
6 September	15:00	Grandmont	0–2	Jura Nord Foot
6 September	15:00	Rochefort Amange	5–1	MT Val-de-Amour
6 September	15:00	Poligny	2–0	Planoise Saint Ferjeux
6 September	15:00	Seloncourt	2–1	Fesches le Chatel
6 September	15:00	Presentev. Sainte Marie	2–2; 3 – 4 pen.	Grandvillars
6 September	15:00	ES Bellherbe	8–1	Villars-sur-Dampjoux
6 September	15:00	Luxeuil	5–3	SR Delle
6 September	15:00	Voujeaucourt	0–1 a.e.t	Nord Territoire
6 September	15:00	Montenois	0–3	Montbeliard Foot
6 September	15:00	Vallee du Breuchin	4–1	US Sochaux
6 September	15:00	US Chatenois	1–2	Rougegoutte
6 September	15:00	Autechaux-Roi	2–3 a.e.t	Herimoncourt
6 September	15:00	AS Bavilliers	4–0	Sous Roches
6 September	15:00	Courtelevant	2–6	Mezire
6 September	15:00	Forges Audincourt	3–5	Haute Lizaine
6 September	15:00	Combeaufontaine Lavo	5–0	Rougemont Concord
6 September	15:00	Aillevillers	–	Saint Loup Corbenay
6 September	15:00	JS Lure	1–0	Valdoie
6 September	15:00	SG Hericourt	6–3	Bart
6 September	15:00	Mouthe	0–1	Aman. Bol. Chan
6 September	15:00	Entre Roches	1–2	PS Besançon
6 September	15:00	FC Le Russey	0–2	Thise-Chalezeule
6 September	15:00	Charquemont	3–0	Les Fins
6 September	15:00	Pirey Ecole Valentin	3–4	Larians et Munans
6 September	15:00	Athletic Club Besançon	2–0	Les Ecorces
6 September	15:00	Evillers	1–2	Pierrefontaine Lavir
6 September	15:00	Roiz-etuz-Cussey	4–3	Orchamps Vennes
6 September	15:00	Perrousienne	4–1	Colombe
6 September	15:00	Sceycolaise	0–1	Port-sur-Saône

=== French Guiana ===
Date	Kick Off	Home	Result	Away
25 September	20:00	AJ Saint Grand Cayenne	0–3	Le Geldar de Kourou
25 September	20:00	ASC Remire	1–0	AS Red Star Cayenne
26 September	15:30	US Macouria	4–0	SC Kourou
26 September	15:30	CO Saint Laurent	1–0	ASC Black Stars
26 September	15:30	AJ de Balata Abrib	1–1; 3 – 4 pen.	AS Oyapock
26 September	15:30	CSC de Cayenne	3–3; 3 – 2 pen.	ASC Agouado
26 September	15:30	AS Grand Santi	4–3	US Sinnamary
26 September	15:30	ASL Sport Guyanais	0–3	US Matoury

=== French Polynesia ===
Date	Kick Off	Home	Result	Away
11 February	20:00	AS Vénus	2–2	AS Temanava
15 February	20:00	AS Temanava	1–0	AS Vénus
Temanava advance 3 – 2 on aggregate
11 February	20:00	AS Tefana	1–2	AS Manu-Ura
15 February	20:00	AS Manu-Ura	2–1	AS Tefana
Manu-Ura advance 4 – 2 on aggregate
11 February	20:00	AS Vaiete	1–1	AS Taravao AC
15 February	20:00	AS Taravao AC	1–4	AS Vaiete
Vaiete advance 5 – 2 on aggregate
11 February	20:00	Tahiti U-20	1–0	AS Tiari Tahiti
15 February	20:00	AS Tiari Tahiti	1–1	Tahiti U-20
Tahiti U-20 advance 2 – 1 on aggregate

=== Guadeloupe ===
Date	Kick Off	Home	Result	Away
4 September	20:00	Stade Lamentois	–	Club Qualifier
4 September	20:00	Eclair	0–2	Siroco Abymes
4 September	20:00	CS Capesterre Bell	1–2	Jeunesse Evolution
4 September	20:00	Olympic ML	1–0	Colonial Club
4 September	20:00	US Ansoise	0–2	Equinoxe
5 September	20:00	Solidarité Scolaire	4–1	ASC Amdiana
5 September	20:00	A.J.S.S	2–0	AS Nenuphars
5 September	20:00	US Baie-Mahault	1–0	AS Gosier
5 September	20:00	CS Le Moule	3–1	Cygne Noir
5 September	20:00	JS Vieux-Habitants	1–2	Evoculas
5 September	20:00	Amical Club	2–0	U.S.C.B
5 September	20:00	L'Etoile de Morne-à-l'Eau	2–1	AS Dragon
5 September	20:00	La Gauloise de Basse-Terre	3–0	J.S.C
5 September	20:00	US Sainte Rose	1–0	Racing Club de Basse-Terre
6 September	15:00	Red Star	0–1	Dynamo Le Moule

=== Haute-Normandie ===
Kick Off	Home	Result	Away
=			

=== Languedoc-Roussillon ===
Kick Off	Home	Result	Away

=== Lorraine ===
Date	Kick Off	Home	Result	Away
29 August	15:00	AS Rech les Sarral	0–1	US Soucht
29 August	15:00	FC Troisfontaines	4–1	Heming FC
29 August	15:00	FC Folschviller	0–6	SR Creutzwald
30 August	15:00	CS Thillotin	0–3	AS Plombieres
30 August	15:00	AS Romanchamp	0–4	AS Gerardmer
30 August	15:00	FC Saulxures 88	1–3	AS Vagney
30 August	15:00	CA Cornimont	0–4	Saulcy FC
30 August	15:00	AS Saint Nabord	1–2	Sainte Omer la Bressaude
30 August	15:00	AS de Chenimenil	1–1; 4 – 3 pen.	Dommar les RT
30 August	15:00	Saut-le-Cerf Epinal	1–7	FC Xertigny
30 August	15:00	AS Darney	0–15	JS Bulgneville
30 August	15:00	La Lorraine Vaucoule	3–0	ES Ancerville
30 August	15:00	Charmois L Orgu FC	0–2	ES Golbey
30 August	15:00	AS Stenay Mouzay	1–0	Verdun Bell.
30 August	15:00	Robert Espagne FC	0–4	Saint Mihiel FC
30 August	15:00	Autreville Harmon	0–1	FC Contrex
30 August	15:00	Saint Mihiel Bruyerois	0–4	AS Girancourt
30 August	15:00	Sporting Minicipaux Etival	0–6	Sainte Marguerite FC
30 August	15:00	Val Argonne	1–8	Bar-le-Duc FC
30 August	15:00	Chavelot FC	2–1	ES Hymont Dompaire
30 August	15:00	FC Dogneville	2–3	US Mirecourt
30 August	15:00	AS Noxemy	0–6	Neufchateau-Iiffol
30 August	15:00	AS Jeanmenilhous	5–1	US Senonaise
30 August	15:00	AS Velaines	0–3	US Ligny-en-Barrios
30 August	15:00	Entente Maizey-Lacroix	0–2	FC Tronville
30 August	15:00	AS Rehainviller	0–2 a.e.t	GS Haroue Benney
30 August	15:00	ES Willerwald	2–4	FC Lemberg Saint Louis
30 August	15:00	ES Longuyonnaise	3–3; 4 – 5 pen.	USB Longwy
30 August	15:00	AS MJC Blamont	0–1	Badonviller Celles
30 August	15:00	Dieuze FC	2–1	US Sarres-et-Donon
30 August	15:00	US Woutsviller	0–1	FC Rohrbach Bitche
30 August	15:00	Petit Rederchin FC	2–5	AS Montbronn
30 August	15:00	SS Hilbesheim	2–0	AS Reding
30 August	15:00	Sporting Lorquin	1–3	FC Sarrebourg
30 August	15:00	ES Heillecourt	3–1	SC Baccarat
30 August	15:00	RS Vandoeuvre 1	2–3	GS Vezelise
30 August	15:00	US Roth	0–6	ES Gros Rederching
30 August	15:00	Toul Jeunes Citoyens	1–2 a.e.t	Sorcy Void
30 August	15:00	SR Gosselming	4–1	Hambach FC
30 August	15:00	AM Chanteheux	0–4	AC Blainville Damel
30 August	15:00	Laneuv. Marain	2–5 a.e.t	AS Ludres
30 August	15:00	US Behonne Longeville	0–5	AS Sieue-Sommedieue
30 August	15:00	FC Pierre la Treiche	0–1	RC Champigneulles
30 August	15:00	Haucourt Saint Charles	1–4	Cosnes Vaux
30 August	15:00	N/A	w/o	AS Varang Saint Nicolas
30 August	15:00	Sarreguem Istanbul	1–3	US Nousseviller
30 August	15:00	Laneuv. la Madeleine	1–6	MJC Nancy Pichon
30 August	15:00	Nancy Marchal Transp	–	COS Villers
30 August	15:00	ACS Herserange	2–6	Av. Longlaville
30 August	15:00	CS Saulnes	3–0	Bure FC
30 August	15:00	FTM Liverdun	0–4	AS Haut du Lievre
30 August	15:00	AS Villey Saint-Étienne	1–0	ES Custines Malleloy
30 August	15:00	Dieulouard Dld 54	1–5	ASC Saulxures
30 August	15:00	FC Re.No.M	1–3	EF Delme-Solgne
30 August	15:00	FR Faulx	0–1	FC Pulnoy
30 August	15:00	US Hundling	0–3	US Holving
30 August	15:00	SO Ippling	7–0	US Behren les Forb
30 August	15:00	AC Saint Avold Huchet	2–1	AS Nebing
30 August	15:00	Verny Louvigny FC	4–5 a.e.t	AS Lay Saint Christophe
30 August	15:00	SS Seingbouse Henri	0–1	US Spicheren
30 August	15:00	ASC Oeting	1–4	ES Macheren
30 August	15:00	US Farebersviller 05	3–1	SO Merlebach
30 August	15:00	FC Rosbruck	1–4	ES Pte Rosselle
30 August	15:00	ES Lixing Laning 95	0–3	AS Morhange
30 August	15:00	Freyming FC	1–4	JS Wenheck
30 August	15:00	ES Etain-Buzy	1–2	VHF Hannonville
30 August	15:00	AS de Guerting	2–5	AS Falck
30 August	15:00	FRFJ Lucy	1–6	Saint Max-Essey FC
30 August	15:00	ES Crehange Faulq.	1–1; 7 – 8 pen.	FC Longeville Saint Av
30 August	15:00	CHA Voelfling	1–4 a.e.t	FC Yutz
30 August	15:00	JS Remering les Hargarten	0–2	AS Anzeling Edling
30 August	15:00	US Cattenom	1–2	ES Villing
30 August	15:00	ES Bechy	1–4	SC Marly
30 August	15:00	Pournoy Cheti	1–0	JA Remilly
30 August	15:00	ES Garche	2–5	ES Renaissance R
30 August	15:00	JS Ancy-sur-Moselle	0–5	AS Pagny-sur-Moselle
30 August	15:00	US Aumetz	2–3	CS Villerupt
30 August	15:00	US Fontoy	1–2	JS Thil
30 August	15:00	FC Vaux	0–10	AS Giraumont Doncourt
30 August	15:00	US Guentrange	0–1	CS Volmerange
30 August	15:00	FC Piennes Bassin	4–0	Noveant FC
30 August	15:00	SC Gueunange	2–1	US Koenigsmacker
30 August	15:00	ARS Laquenexy	1–2	FC Devant les Ponts
30 August	15:00	ARS Moselle	2–8	ES Metz
30 August	15:00	US Conflans	2–1 a.e.t	US Jarny
30 August	15:00	AS Montigny-Metz	3–1 a.e.t	UL Plantieres
30 August	15:00	ESAP Metz	2–1	CO Metz
30 August	15:00	US le Ban Saint Martin	1–5	Saint Julien Metz
30 August	15:00	US Marspich	2–4	ES Woippy
30 August	15:00	Angevillers FC	0–2	RS Seremange Erzange
30 August	15:00	AS Entrange	0–4	FC Hettange
30 August	15:00	JS Manom	2–3 a.e.t	CS Veymerange
30 August	15:00	Renaissance S. Amanv	2–3	JS Ennery
30 August	15:00	ASP Saint Thionville	4–2	UL Rombas
30 August	15:00	U. Lorraine Mayeuvre	0–3	FC Tremery
30 August	15:00	AS les Coteaux	2–0	E.S.H.P.M
30 August	15:00	ES de Jœuf	2–2; 4 – 2 pen.	CS Homecourt
30 August	15:00	US Avrilloise	0–1	FC Hayange
30 August	15:00	ES Gandrange	0–2	FC Hagondange
30 August	15:00	Lorraine S. Rosselan	1–2	FC Mondelange
30 August	15:00	US Boulange	1–6	AS Florange
13 September	15:00	FC du Val Dunois	–	US Litteraire Mont

=== Maine ===
Date	Kick Off	Home	Result	Away
6 September	15:00	FC Bais Montaigu	0–5	CA Evron
6 September	15:00	US Bourgon	2–7	Ernée
6 September	15:00	US Le Genest	0–3	Louverné Sports
6 September	15:00	AS Moutaudin	0–3	US Laval
6 September	15:00	US Laval Reunion	0–3	US Aron
6 September	15:00	AS Martigne-sur-May	1–3	Saint Pierre des Land.
6 September	15:00	Moulay Sports	0–8	ASO Montenay
6 September	15:00	Saint Georges But. V.	1–4	FC Lassay
6 September	15:00	Contest-St Baud.	2–0	AS Gorron
6 September	15:00	USCP Montsurs	0–2	FC Stade Mayenne
6 September	15:00	FC Ambrieres	2–8	US Villaines Juhel
6 September	15:00	US Le Horps	1–2	Landivy Pontmain
6 September	15:00	AS Bourgneuf	1–2	Saint Ouen des Toits
6 September	15:00	AS Andouille	0–1	AS Laval Bourny
6 September	15:00	AS Saint Aignan-sur-Roe	2–2; 3 – 2 pen.	La Selle Craonnaise
6 September	15:00	US Entrammes	3–4	ES Craon
6 September	15:00	AS Laigne	1–3	Meslay-du-Maine
6 September	15:00	ES Pommerieux	0–4	AS Loigne-sur-Mayenne
6 September	15:00	US Argentre	0–4	US Force
6 September	15:00	ES Maisoncelles	1–2	FC Chateau Gontier
6 September	15:00	AS Chamaze	1–1; 3 – 4 pen	AS Louvigne
6 September	15:00	US Renaze	0–1	ASPTT Laval
6 September	15:00	FC Montjean	1–7	ASL L'Huisserie
6 September	15:00	US Le Luart	2–0	US Guecelard
6 September	15:00	ES Champfleur	0–1	SA Mamers
6 September	15:00	Sainte Jamme-Sarthe Sports	2–1	SA Beaumont
6 September	15:00	US Savigne L'Eveque	0–3	Saint Saturnin-Arche
6 September	15:00	AS Saint Paterne	3–2	Montfort Le Gesnois
6 September	15:00	US Rouesse V.	0–5	Tennie Saint Symphorien
6 September	15:00	Le Mans Gazelec Sports	0–5	AS La Milesse
6 September	15:00	Sille Le Guillaume	1–0	JS Parigne L'Eveque
6 September	15:00	ES Yvre L'Eveque	1–2	Savigne L'Eveque FC
6 September	15:00	OS Dollon	1–3	Bonnetable Paterne
6 September	15:00	US La Chapelle Saint Remy	1–3	ES Concerre
6 September	15:00	CO Cermes	3–4 a.e.t	US Vibraye'
6 September	15:00	SS Souge Le Ganelon	7–2	La Bozage FC
6 September	15:00	USN Spay	6–0	CO Laigne-Saint Gervais
6 September	15:00	Le Mans Sablons	4–2	AS Brette-les-Pins
6 September	15:00	La Chartre Val-du-Lo	0–3	Le Mans Villaret
6 September	15:00	US Roeze-Sarthe	0–4	Saint Mars La Briere
6 September	15:00	SS Noyen-Sarthe	0–1	JS Le Lude
6 September	15:00	US Villaines-sur-Sarthe	2–2; 6 – 7 pen.	Le Mans Glonnieres
6 September	15:00	AS Ruaudin	1–0	EG Rouillon
6 September	15:00	Cerans Foulletourte	0–2	CS Change
6 September	15:00	US Oize	2–4	Brulon Patriote
6 September	15:00	Mayet Vigilante	0–2	Chateau-du-Loire
6 September	15:00	US Precigne	2–0	US Bazouges
6 September	15:00	US Saint Ouen-Saint Biez	1–7	Monce-en-Belin
6 September	15:00	JS Solesmes	3–4	AS Saint Pavace

=== Martinique ===
Date	Kick Off	Home	Result	Away
16 September	20:00	RC Saint Joseph	2–3	La Gauloise de Trinité
16 September	20:00	Club Franciscain	4–3	New Club
18 September	20:00	Anses Arlets FC	1–0	CS Vauclinois
18 September	20:00	Club Colonial	0–1	Rapid Club
18 September	20:00	Eclair	0–2	Golden Lion Foot
19 September	15:00	Samaritaine	4–0	U. des Jeunes de Mon
19 September	15:00	US Robert	1–1; 7 – 6 pen.	JS Eucalyptus
19 September	15:00	US Riveraine	0–4	US Marinoise
19 September	15:00	RC Rivière-Pilote	3–2	New Star Ducos
19 September	15:00	Essor-Préchotain	0–1	US Diamantinoise
19 September	15:00	Aiglon du Lamentin	6–0	Excelsior
19 September	15:00	Santana Club Sainte Anne	0–1	Foy.Rur. Durivage
19 September	15:00	Stade Spiritain	1–1; 6 – 7 pen.	U. des Jeunes de Red
19 September	15:00	CS Case-Pilote	2–0	Réveil-Sportif
19 September	15:00	FC Ducos	0–2	Emulation
19 September	15:00	Golden Star	1–0	AC Vert-Pré

=== Mayotte ===
Date	Kick Off	Home	Result	Away
16 May	19:00	FC Mtsapéré	2–1	Tchanga FC
16 May	19:00	Koungou	1–3	FC Chiconi
16 May	19:00	ASCEEN	1–3	Abeilles
16 May	19:00	Esperance Iloni	0–1	UCS Sada
16 May	19:00	AS Sada	1–3	Guinée Club
16 May	19:00	AJ Kani-Kéli	2–1	FCO
16 May	19:00	Pap. Bleu	0–2	Foudre 2000
16 May	19:00	US Majicavo	0–4	ASC Kawéni
16 May	19:00	FC Dembéni	4–3	Racine du Nord
16 May	19:00	Enf. du Port	2–3	Miracle du Sud
16 May	19:00	Mahabou SC	3–1	US Ouangani
16 May	19:00	Enf. de Mayotte	2–1	Rosador
16 May	19:00	AS Neige	3–1	FC Koropa
16 May	19:00	Pamandzi SC	2–2; 4 – 5 pen.	Etincelles
16 May	19:00	USPL	2–0	FC Passamaïnty

=== Méditerranée ===
Date	Kick Off	Home	Result	Away
5 September	17:00	USM Meyreuil	1–2	ASPTT La Ciota
5 September	18:00	Sollies Farlede	1–4	Six Fours Le Brusc
6 September	15:00	US Les Mees	3–2	L'Avance FC
6 September	15:00	Valens-Greoux	1–3	ES Pennoise
6 September	15:00	AS Gignacaise	2–0	SC Montfavet
6 September	15:00	AS Gemenosienne	3–0	FA Chateaurenard
6 September	15:00	SO Septemes	0–2	SC Courthezon
6 September	15:00	ES Fosseenne	3–1	Carpentras FC
6 September	15:00	US Autre Provence	4–1	SC Gadagne
6 September	15:00	SC Orange	3–5	EUGA Ardziv
6 September	15:00	Istres Rassuen FC	2–0	AS Saint Remy
6 September	15:00	US Venelles	1–2	CFC Avignon
6 September	15:00	Avignon Foot 84	1–0	Saint Marcel FC
6 September	15:00	ARS Belsunce	6–1	USR Pertuis
6 September	15:00	ESP Pernes	5–1	FC De Sisteron
6 September	15:00	Tarascon FC	3–0	US 1er Canton
6 September	15:00	SCOC La Cayolle	1–6	AS Aixoise
6 September	15:00	ES Port Saint Louis	2–2; 4 – 3 pen.	US Orange Gres
6 September	15:00	Nyons FC	1–1; 2 – 4 pen.	US Caderousse
6 September	15:00	Mayotte Cote Azur	0–10	Antibes
6 September	15:00	US Carq-Crau	2–3	JS Saint Jean Beaulieu
6 September	15:00	CDJ-ASOA	2–3	AS Maximoise
6 September	15:00	US Cagnes	4–1 a.e.t	Olympique Le Lavandou Sports
6 September	15:00	Saint Zacharie	3–1	SC Mouans Sartou
6 September	15:00	SC Dracenie	1–0	AS Roquebrune Cap
6 September	15:00	Olympique Rovenain	3–0	Olympique Barbentane
6 September	15:00	Esovictorine	0–5	FC de Mougins Cote
6 September	15:00	AS Giens	0–2	T. Le Las
6 September	15:00	Carros	0–0; 4 – 3 pen.	AS Vence

=== New Caledonia ===
Date	Kick Off	Home	Result	Away
24 January	15:00	JS Maré	3–2	AS Wet
24 January	15:00	USC	4–2	JS Vallée du Tir
24 January	15:00	FC Auteuil	14–0	ESN
24 January	15:00	St-Louis	4–3	Val Fleuri
24 January	15:00	Thuahaïck	3–4	Ravel Sport
24 January	15:00	Gaïtcha	3–1	Havannah Goro
24 January	15:00	Tiga Sport	3–1	AS Frégate
24 January	15:00	Boulouparis	4–0	SCXL
24 January	15:00	JS Ny	8–1	Nadoro
31 January	20:00	CO Main Noire	4–0	Entente Gélima
31 January	20:00	AS Paouta	0–9	AS Goa

=== Nord-Pas de Calais ===
Kick Off	Home	Result	Away

=== Picardie ===
Date	Kick Off	Home	Result	Away
29 August	17:00	AF Fayet	2–0	GBF Gauchy
29 August	18:00	RC Bohain	0–0; 4 – 3 pen.	US Guise
30 August	15:00	Saint Quentin FC	2–3 a.e.t	FC Amigny Rouy
30 August	15:00	TFC Neuve Maison	0–1	AC Le Nouvion
30 August	15:00	US Aulnois-sur-Loan	4–1	ES Clacy Mons
30 August	15:00	ICS Crecois	6–1	US Vadencourt
30 August	15:00	CS Montescourt	0–2	SAS Moy De L Aisne
30 August	15:00	AS Beaurevoir	0–4	FC Holnon
30 August	15:00	Racing Nogentais 02	0–3	FC Chateau Th.
30 August	15:00	Marle Sports	2–1	FC Hannapes
30 August	15:00	US Seboncourt	1–4	NES Boue
30 August	15:00	US Cruyeres Montbe	0–2	ALJ Crepy
30 August	15:00	AS Milonaise	3–2	IEC Chateau
30 August	15:00	OC Septmonts	2–6	FC Vierzy
30 August	15:00	US Athies-sur-Laon	2–2; 1 – 2 pen.	US Buire Hirson
30 August	15:00	ES Evergnicourt	1–3 a.e.t	US Guignicourt
30 August	15:00	AS Saint Michel	1–1; 6 – 7 pen.	US Vervins
30 August	15:00	AS Étampes	1–0 a.e.t	US Folembray
30 August	15:00	US Ribemont 02	4–0	US Premontre
30 August	15:00	ASA Presles	0–0; 4 – 2 pen.	FC Villers Cott.
30 August	15:00	Olympique Mennessis	1–10	FC Soissons
30 August	15:00	BCVF Club	4–3	US Villers Cott.
30 August	15:00	Arsenal Club	2–1	Itancourt Neuville
30 August	15:00	ASPTT Laon	2–3 a.e.t	SC Noyon
30 August	15:00	Noyers Saint Martin	4–0	USE Saint Leu
30 August	15:00	AJ Montleveque	0–4	USM Senlis
30 August	15:00	Boran FC	2–3	US Gouvieux
30 August	15:00	FC Vineuil Saint Firmin	1–0	AS Verneuil
30 August	15:00	SC Songeons	3–3; 5 – 4 pen.	AC Grandvilliers
30 August	15:00	AS Elincourt	1–2	AS Thourotte
30 August	15:00	US Bresles	0–8	AC Hermes Berth.
30 August	15:00	Longueil Ann.	0–0; 6 – 5 pen.	ASC Grandfresnoy
30 August	15:00	FC Bailleul	1–5	US Breteuil
30 August	15:00	US Fouquenies	1–1; 1 – 3 pen.	Marseille-en-Bvsis
30 August	15:00	ASC Morienval	3–0	La Chapelle Orry
30 August	15:00	AFC Creil	3–0	GSP Montataire
30 August	15:00	US Lamorlaye	4–2 a.e.t	US Saint Maximin
30 August	15:00	AS Henonville	3–4	US Mouy
30 August	15:00	US Saint-Genevieve	0–2	US Meru
30 August	15:00	US Breuil Sec	1–4 a.e.t	US Nogent 60
30 August	15:00	US Estrees	0–2 a.e.t	AS Lacroix Saint Ouen
30 August	15:00	AS Pontpoint	0–1	USPT Saint Maxence
30 August	15:00	US Plessis Brion	0–1	AS Allonne
30 August	15:00	ES Duvy	3–2	Stade Ressons
30 August	15:00	ASL Le Deluge	1–3	USR Saint-Crepin
30 August	15:00	La Neuville-sur-Oud	0–1	US Crèvecœur
30 August	15:00	AS Saint Remy	3–1	Maignelay Montigny
30 August	15:00	FC Bethisy	0–0; 4 – 5 pen.	AS Plailly
30 August	15:00	ES Compiègne	0–2	Choisy-au-Bac
30 August	15:00	FC Sacy Saint Martin	1–5	AS Saint Sauveur
30 August	15:00	AS Auneuil	2–3	CS Chaumont
30 August	15:00	FC Salency	3–2	AS Tracy Le Mont
30 August	15:00	FC Cauffry	0–4	US Balagny
30 August	15:00	US Saint Germer	0–1 a.e.t	Beauvais Port
30 August	15:00	FC Guignecourt	2–2; 5 – 6 pen.	CO Beauvais
30 August	15:00	Mareuil-sur-Our	0–3	AS Silly Le Long
30 August	15:00	CS Haudivillers	1–6	CS Liencourt
30 August	15:00	US Villers Saint Paul	0–4	US Etouy
30 August	15:00	Amiens Condorcet	1–4	3VB Saint Vast
30 August	15:00	ASL Saveuse	1–1; 3 – 0 pen.	US Neuville Villers
30 August	15:00	Amiens Saint Maurice	0–4	Amiens Pigeonnier
30 August	15:00	Olympique Monchy	0–4	AS Querrieu
30 August	15:00	Limeux Huchenneville	2–6	AS Gamaches
30 August	15:00	FC Hombleux	1–5	ES Saint Emilie
30 August	15:00	US Bethencourt	3–5 a.e.t	Croisien Av.
30 August	15:00	US Ham	1–0	ESC Longueau
30 August	15:00	Amiens Portugais	1–6	RC Doullens
30 August	15:00	SC Beauval	3–13	US Le Boisle
30 August	15:00	CS Crecy	1–0 a.e.t	FC Oisemont
30 August	15:00	L'Entente Sains Saint-Fusc	1–2	AC Montdidier
30 August	15:00	AS Saint Sauveur 80	3–1	FC Blangy
30 August	15:00	US Moyenneville	1–1; 8 – 9 pen.	AAE Nibas
30 August	15:00	SC Flixecourt	1–3	Amiens PTT
30 August	15:00	JS Quevauvillers	1–2 a.e.t	RC Amiens
30 August	15:00	AS Vauchelloise	0–7	FC Saint Valery
30 August	15:00	US Woincourt	0–0; 5 – 6 pen.	AS Mers
30 August	15:00	AS Cerisy	0–2	FC Amiens
30 August	15:00	SC Moreuil	2–3	Amiens Montieres
30 August	15:00	US Lignieres	1–2	AS Evoissons
30 August	15:00	FR Englebelmer	2–3	US Daours
30 August	15:00	AAE Chaulnes	0–1	CAFC Peronne
30 August	15:00	FC La Centuloise	2–3	US Friville
30 August	15:00	AAE Feuquieres	1–2	FC Mareuil Caubert
30 August	15:00	AS Talmes	5–8 a.e.t	US Quend
30 August	15:00	Auxiloise	0–2	AS Allery 2 A

=== Réunion ===
Date	Kick Off	Home	Result	Away
10 June	20:30	OCSA Leopards	0–5	US Saint-Marie
10 June	20:30	FC Saint Paulois	2–1	AS Chaudron
10 June	20:30	L'USST	7–0	JS Piton Saint Leu
10 June	20:30	Saint-Denis FC	2–1	Tampon FC
10 June	20:30	US Saint Anne	1–4	SS Jeanne d'Arc
10 June	20:30	SS Saint-Louisienne	3–1	CS Saint Gilles
11 June	20:30	US Bell Canot	0–5	JS Saint-Pierroise
11 June	20:30	FC 17ème KM	0–1	SS Excelsior
13 June	20:00	SS Rivière Sport	0–0; 6 – 5 pen.	JS Vincendo
13 June	20:00	SS Capricorne	2–0	Union Saint Benedictin
13 June	20:00	AS Possession	1–3	FC Avirons
13 June	20:00	SS Gauloise	4–0	JS Cressonn
13 June	20:00	A.J. Petite ILE	1–3	ES Suzanne Bagat
13 June	20:00	Saint-Denis Ecole de Foot	2–1	FC Bassins
13 June	20:00	FC Bois-de-Nèfles	0–3	CO Ter Saint
13 June	20:00	AS Marsouins	2–1	AS Eperon

=== Rhône-Alpes ===
Kick Off	Home	Result	Away

== See also ==
- Coupe de France 2009–10
- 2009–10 Coupe de France preliminary round
- 2009–10 Coupe de France 3rd through 4th rounds
- 2009–10 Coupe de France 5th through 6th rounds
- Ligue 1 2009–10
- Ligue 2 2009–10
- Championnat National 2009–10
- Championnat de France Amateurs 2009–10
- Championnat de France Amateurs 2 2009-10
