= Elissalde =

Elissalde, also spelled Élissalde, is a surname. Notable French bearers include:

- Jean-Baptiste Élissalde (born 1977), rugby player
- Jean-Pierre Élissalde (born 1953), rugby coach, father of Jean-Baptiste
- Rémi Elissalde (born 1991), footballer
