= Rigas (surname) =

Rigas is a surname. Notable people with the surname include:

- Angela Rigas, American politician
- Costas Rigas (born 1944), Greek pro basketball player and referee
- Elena Rigas (born 1996), Danish inline and speed skater
- John Rigas (born 1924), American businessman
- Themis Rigas (1945–1984), Greek footballer

== See also ==
- Riga (surname)
