= Riga (surname) =

Riga is a surname. Notable people with the surname include:

- Ariel Silvio Zárate Riga (born 1973), Argentine footballer
- Bernardo Javier González Riga, Argentine palaeontologist
- Bill Riga (born 1974), American hockey coach
- José Riga (born 1957), Belgian football player and manager
- Petrus Riga (c. 1140–1209), French poet
- Rolando David Zárate Riga (born 1978), Argentine footballer
- Stevie Riga (born 1989), French football player
