= Kévin Diogo =

French footballer (born 1991)

Personal information
- Date of birth: 8 July 1991 (age 35)
- Place of birth: Sens, France
- Height: 1.81 m (5 ft 11 in)
- Position: Midfielder

Youth career
- 2004–2007: INF Clairefontaine
- 2007–2009: Paris Saint-Germain
- 2009–2010: Caen
- 2010–2011: Sens
- 2011–2013: Clermont

Senior career*
Years	Team	Apps	(Gls)
2013–2017	Clermont	29	(0)
2015–2016	→ Châteauroux (loan)	21	(1)
2017–2018	Kerkyra	16	(1)
2018–2020	Les Herbiers	8	(0)
2020–2022	Chamalières	19	(0)
- * Club domestic league appearances and goals as of 20:17, 17 January 2023 (UTC)

Kévin Diogo (born 8 July 1991) is a French professional footballer who plays as a midfielder.

== Club career ==
Diogo made his full professional debut in a 2–1 Ligue 2 victory over Tours in August 2013, coming on the pitch at the last minute as a substitute for Anthony Lippini.

He joined Championnat National side Châteauroux on a loan deal on 9 September 2015.

He joined Super League Greece club Kerkyra on a 2.5-year contract on 20 February 2017.

== Career statistics ==
As of 12 March 2017

Appearances and goals by club, season and competition
Club	Season	League		National cup (Note: Includes Coupe de France.)			League cup (Note: Includes Coupe de la Ligue.)		Total	
Club	Season	Division	Apps	Goals	Apps	Goals	Apps	Goals	Apps	Goals
Clermont	2013–14	Ligue 2	11	0	0	0	1	0	12	0
Clermont	2014–15	Ligue 2	18	0	2	0	2	1	22	1
Clermont	2015–16	Ligue 2	0	0	0	0	2	0	2	0
Châteauroux (loan)	2015–16	National	21	1	0	0	0	0	21	1
Kerkyra	2016–17	Super League Greece	8	1	0	0	0	0	8	1
Career total			58	2	2	0	5	1	65	3
