= Youssef Adnane =

French footballer of Moroccan descent (born 1985)

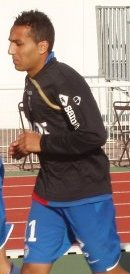

Personal information
- Full name: Youssef Adnane
- Date of birth: 16 July 1985 (age 41)
- Place of birth: Mulhouse, France
- Height: 1.78 m (5 ft 10 in)
- Position: Striker

Team information
- Current team: Nakhon Pathom United

Youth career
- 1993–2005: FC Mulhouse

Senior career*
Years	Team	Apps	(Gls)
2005–2007	Brest	7	(0)
2006	→ Châtellerault (loan)	11	(4)
2007–2008	→ AS Cherbourg (loan)	50	(34)
2008–2009	Caen	14	(0)
2009–2010	Angers	12	(1)
2010	→ Évian (loan)	18	(10)
2010–2013	Évian	62	(21)
2013–2015	Tours	53	(18)
2015–2016	Brest	27	(15)
2017–	Nakhon Pathom United	0	(0)
- * Club domestic league appearances and goals as of 11 December 2015 (UTC)

Youssef Adnane (born 16 July 1985) is a French footballer who plays for French club Nakhon Pathom United in Thai League 2.

== Football career ==
Born in Mulhouse, Adnane began his career in the youth system of his hometown club FC Mulhouse. After spending a decade there, he was signed by Ligue 2 club Stade Brestois 29. He only made seven appearances at the club scoring no goals before being loan out to Championnat National side SO Châtellerault for the winter, where he made 11 appearances and scored 4 goals. Following his return to Brest, he was again loaned out, this time for two years to AS Cherbourg. Adnane adjusted well with the Normandy-based side scoring 34 goals in 50 matches over two league seasons.

After his two spectacular seasons with Cherbourg, Ligue 1 club SM Caen secured his services for the 2008–09 season. Adnane appeared in 14 matches for the season and, for the 2009–10 season, was signed by Angers SCO. Adnane's stint with Angers was brief appearing in 12 matches and scoring one goal during the first half of the season. In the second half of the season, Adnane was loaned out to third division club Évian. He scored ten goals on nine appearances helping the club win National and earn promotion to Ligue 2 for the first time in the club's history. On 10 July 2010, Adnane was signed on a permanent three-year deal with Évian.

In July 2013, Adnane was given a trial at Seattle Sounders FC in Major League Soccer but he was not offered a contract. Next month, he joined Tours in Ligue 2. He recently joined Brest on the winter transfer window.

In August 2017, Adnane was given a trial at Bengaluru FC and played a friendly against UCAM Murcia CF in which he provided an assist to Sunil Chettri and started against FC Cartagena in the second friendly game in their pre-season tour in Spain.
