= Moirans-en-Montagne =

Commune in Bourgogne-Franche-Comté, France

- Commune
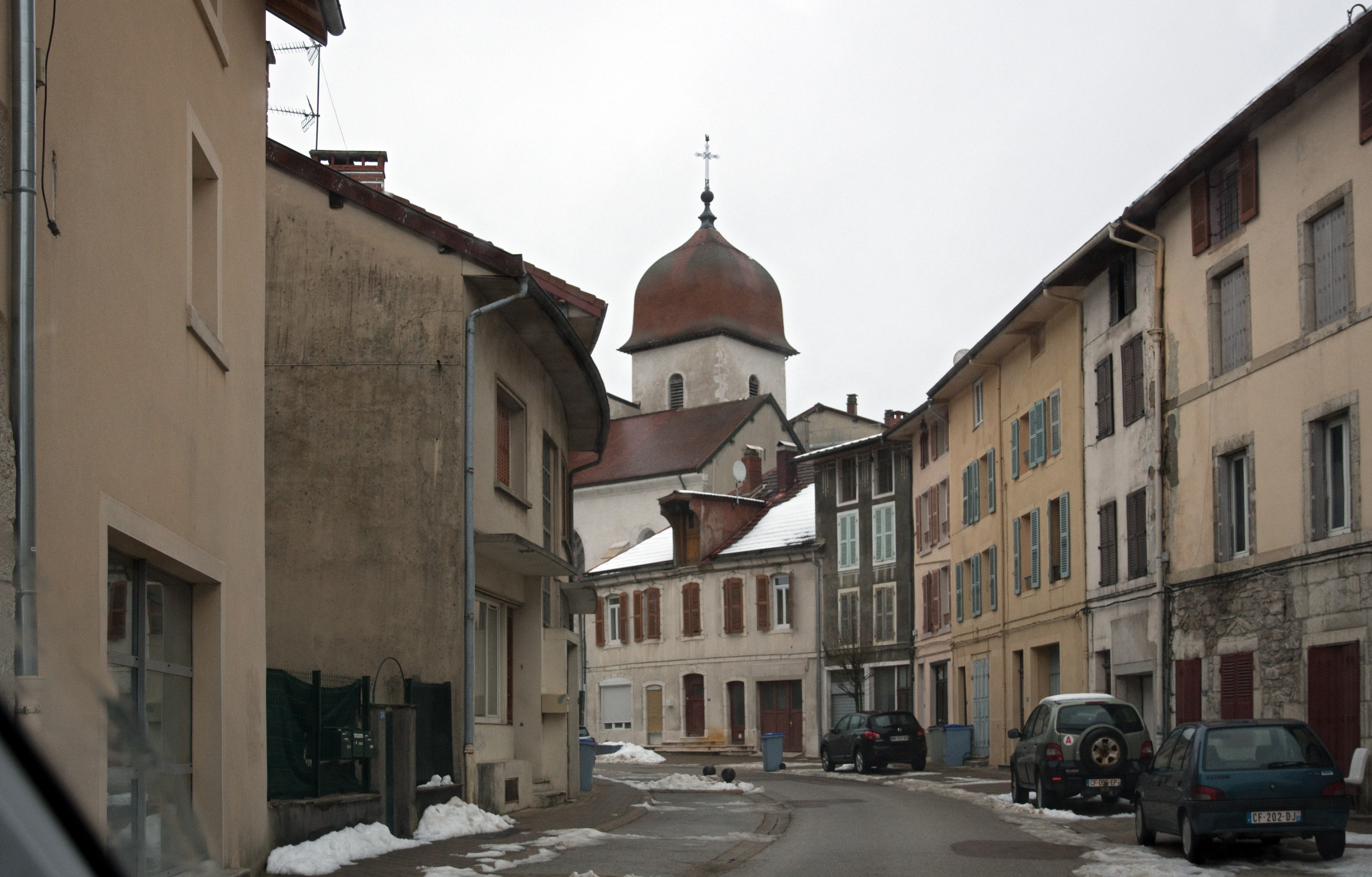
- Rue Pasteur

- Coat of arms
- Location of Moirans-en-Montagne
- Location within France Location within Bourgogne-Franche-Comté
- Coordinates: 46°25′57″N 5°43′34″E
- Country: France
- Region: Bourgogne-Franche-Comté
- Department: Jura
- Arrondissement: Saint-Claude
- Canton: Moirans-en-Montagne

Government
  - Mayor (2020–2026): Grégoire Long
- Area^{1}: 26.56 km^{2} (10.25 sq mi)
- Highest elevation: 981 m (3,219 ft)
- Lowest elevation: 423 m (1,388 ft)
- Population (2023): 2,107
  - Density: 79.33/km^{2} (205.5/sq mi)
- Time zone: UTC+01:00 (CET)
  - Summer (DST): UTC+02:00 (CEST)
- INSEE/Postal code: 39333 /39260
- ^{1} French Land Register data, which excludes lakes, ponds, glaciers > 1 km^{2} (0.386 sq mi or 247 acres) and river estuaries.

Moirans-en-Montagne (French pronunciation: [mwaʁɑ̃ ɑ̃ mɔ̃taɲ]) is a commune in the Jura department in Bourgogne-Franche-Comté in eastern France.

The village houses the Toy Museum (Musée du Jouet).

== Population ==
Historical population

Year	Pop.	±% p.a.
1793	1,150	—
1800	1,190	+0.49%
1806	1,200	+0.14%
1821	1,307	+0.57%
1831	1,355	+0.36%
1836	1,481	+1.79%
1841	1,486	+0.07%
1846	1,503	+0.23%
1851	1,458	−0.61%
1856	1,339	−1.69%
1861	1,377	+0.56%
1866	1,284	−1.39%
1872	1,249	−0.46%
1876	1,238	−0.22%
1881	1,240	+0.03%
1886	1,271	+0.50%
1891	1,283	+0.19%
1896	1,301	+0.28%
1901	1,406	+1.56%

Year	Pop.	±% p.a.
1906	1,333	−1.06%
1911	1,410	+1.13%
1921	1,529	+0.81%
1926	1,672	+1.80%
1931	1,649	−0.28%
1936	1,532	−1.46%
1946	1,599	+0.43%
1954	1,542	−0.45%
1962	1,464	−0.65%
1968	1,551	+0.97%
1975	2,043	+4.01%
1982	1,954	−0.63%
1990	2,018	+0.40%
1999	2,121	+0.55%
2007	2,291	+0.97%
2012	2,310	+0.17%
2017	2,099	−1.90%
2023	2,107	+0.06%

Source: EHESS and INSEE (1968-2023)

== Gallery ==
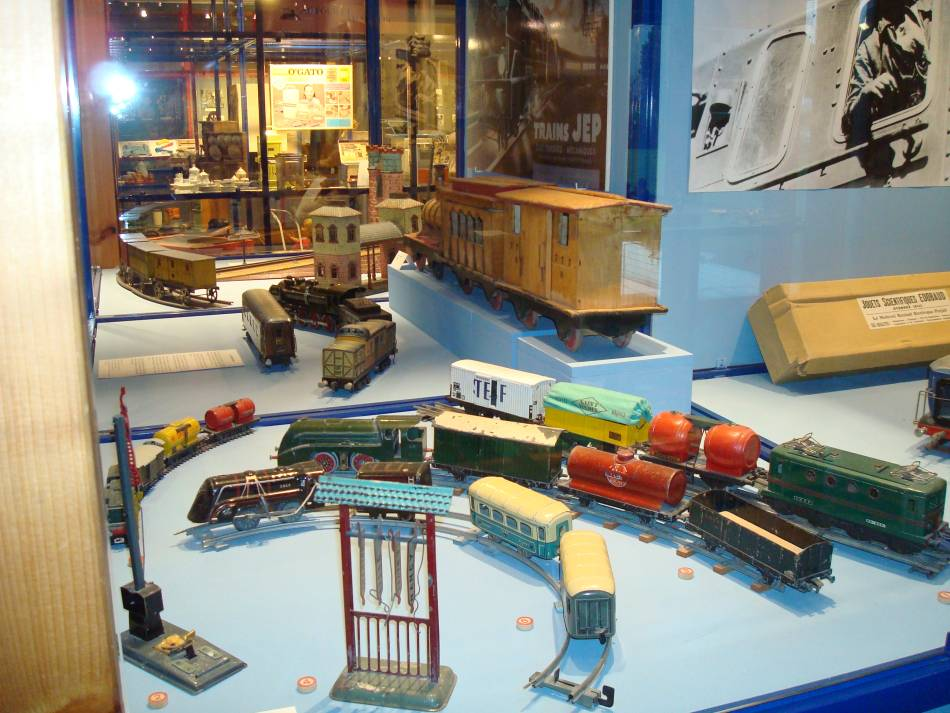
Toy Museum

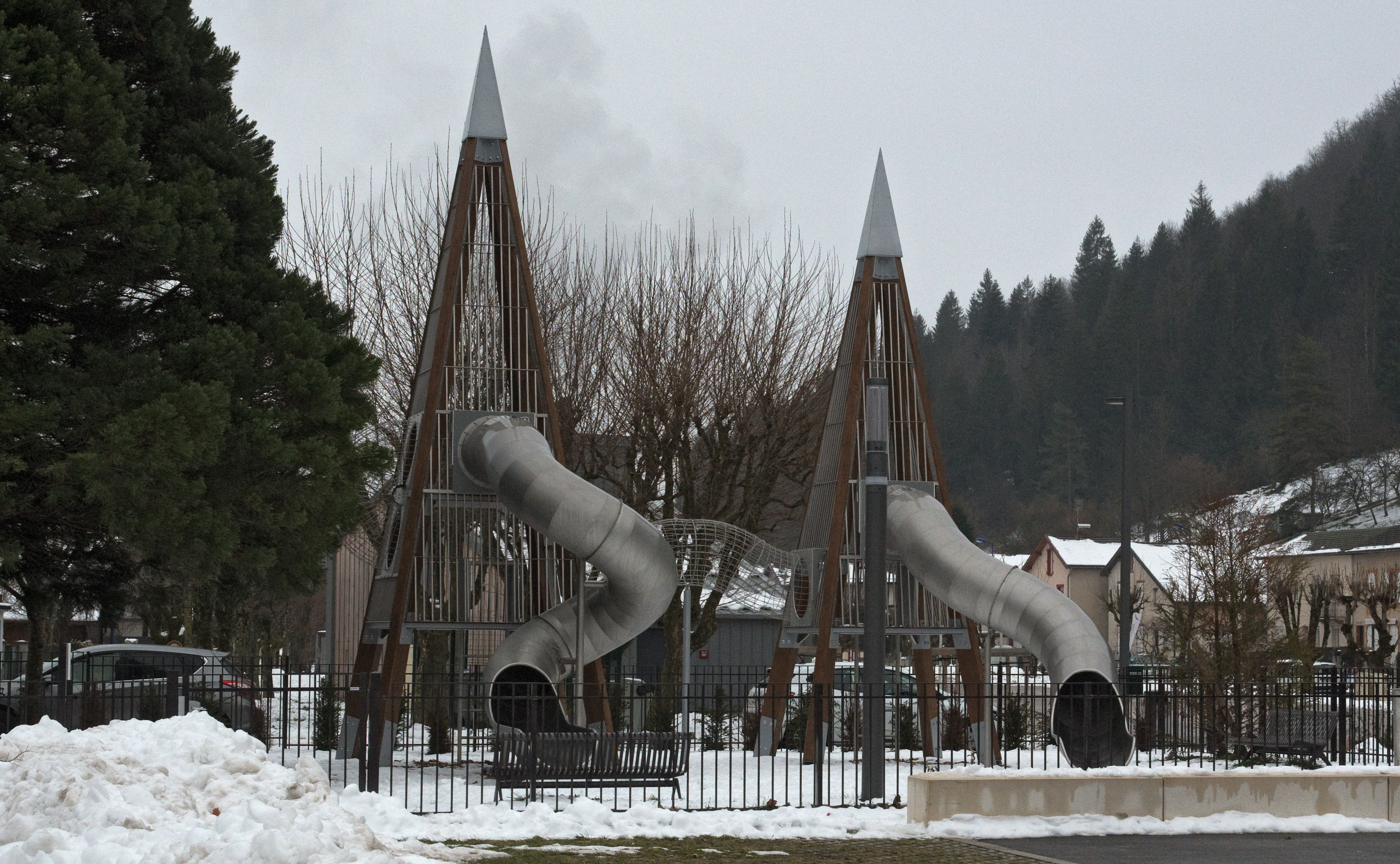
Tube slides in a playground

== See also ==
- Communes of the Jura department
