= Adama Sarr =

Senegalese footballer

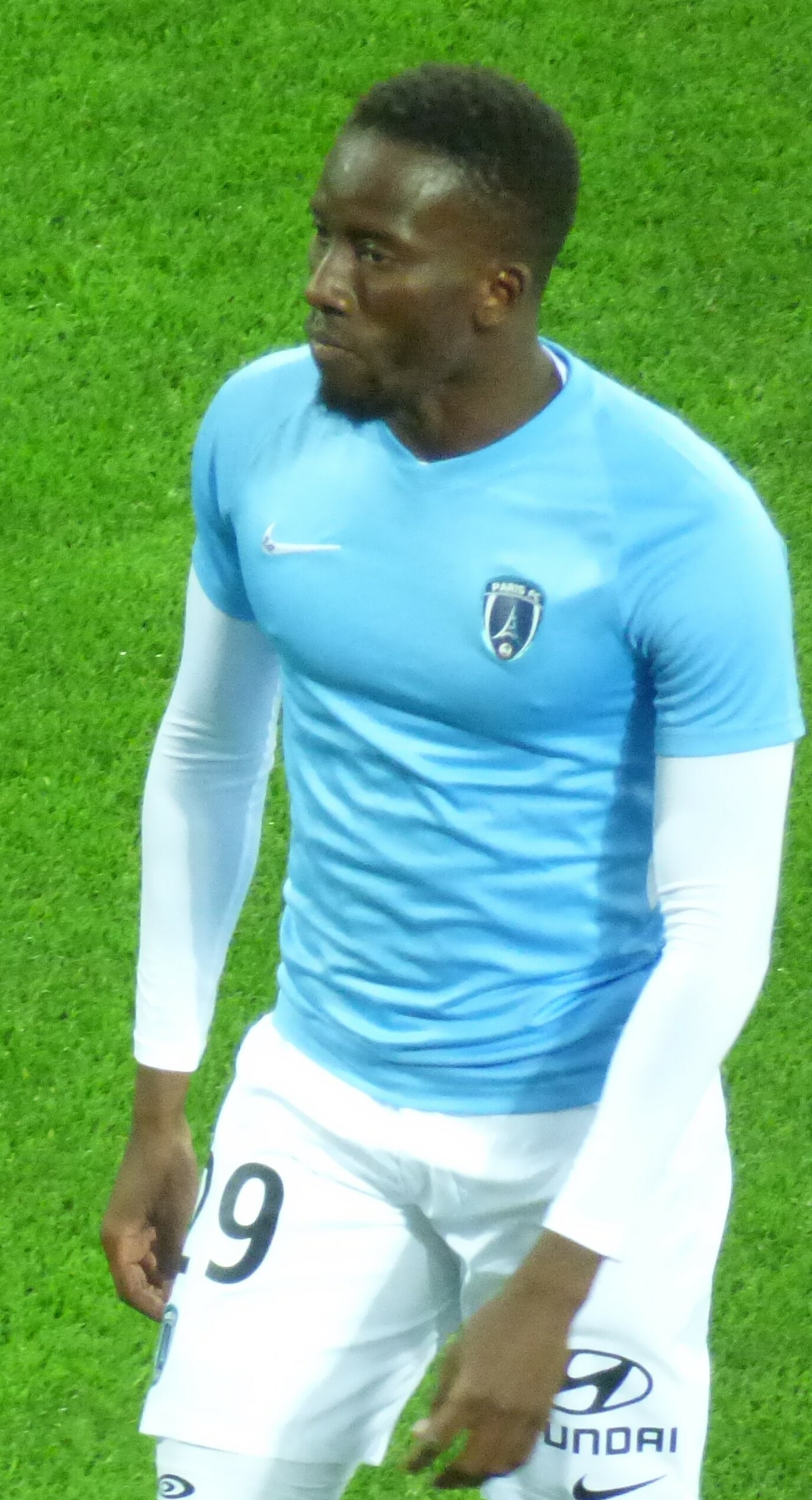
- Sarr in 2018

Personal information
- Full name: Adama Sarr
- Date of birth: 15 March 1991 (age 35)
- Place of birth: Guediawaye, Senegal
- Height: 1.74 m (5 ft 9 in)
- Position: Forward

Team information
- Current team: La Roche VF
- Number: 27

Youth career
- 2008–2012: Lorient

Senior career*
Years	Team	Apps	(Gls)
2010–2012	Lorient II	51	(13)
2012–2013	Red Star	39	(3)
2013–2014	Ivry	12	(4)
2014–2015	Quevilly-Rouen	27	(10)
2015–2017	Les Herbiers	58	(23)
2017–2018	Bourg-Péronnas	33	(10)
2018–2020	Paris FC	33	(1)
2020	Tuzlaspor	1	(0)
2021–2022	Gaz Metan Mediaș	23	(0)
2023–	La Roche VF	17	(6)
- * Club domestic league appearances and goals as of 20:05, 4 January 2024 (UTC)

Adama Sarr (born 15 March 1991) is a Senegalese professional footballer who plays as a forward for La Roche VF.

== Professional career ==
Sarr signed for Football Bourg-en-Bresse Péronnas 01 in the summer on 2 June 2017 after successful seasons in the lower divisions of France. He made his professional debut with FBBP in a 2–0 Ligue 2 loss to FC Sochaux-Montbéliard on 28 July 2017.
