= Joris Colinet =

French footballer (born 1982)

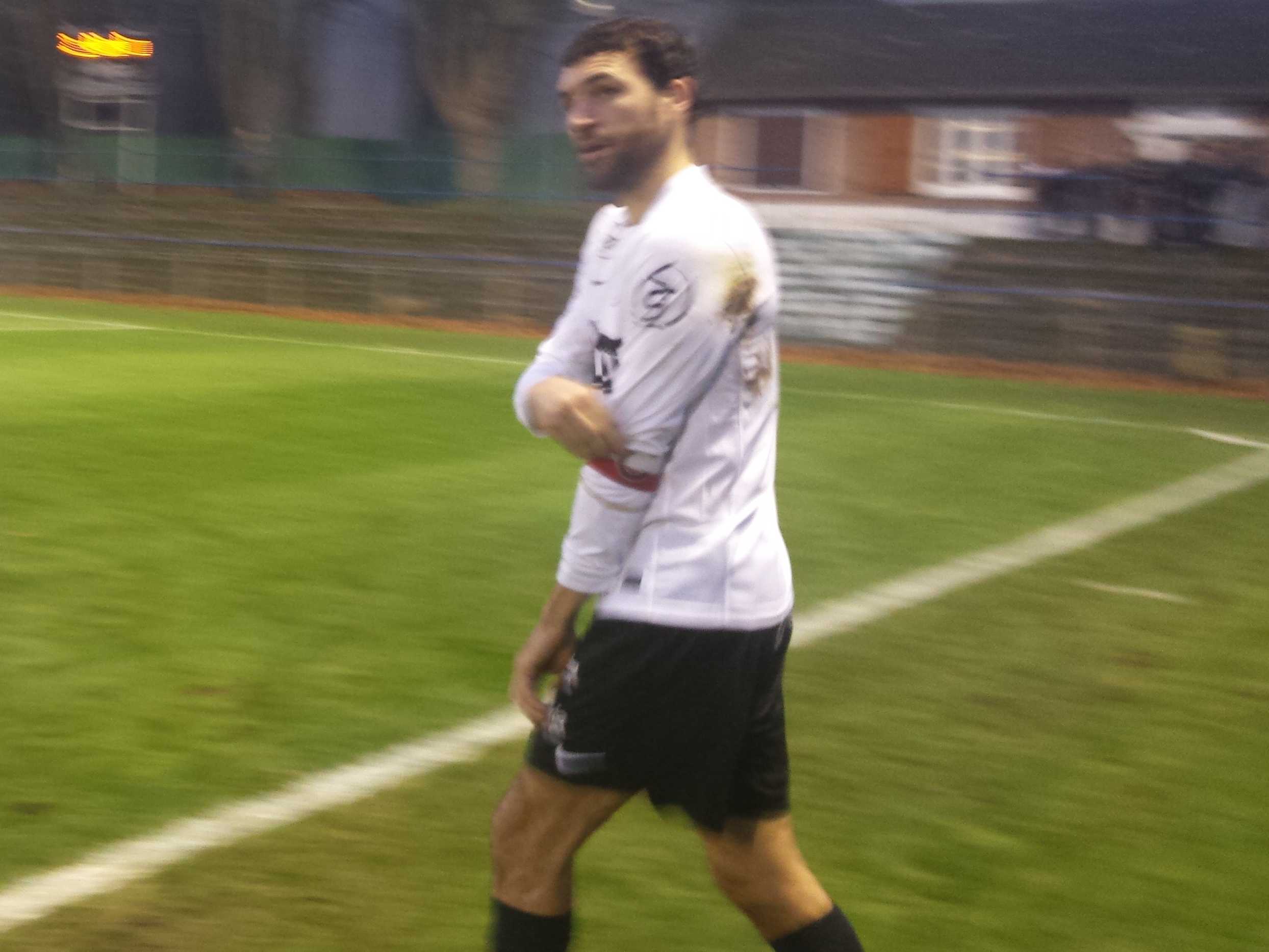
- Colinet with Quevilly-Rouen in 2014

Personal information
- Date of birth: 27 September 1982 (age 44)
- Place of birth: Mont-Saint-Aignan, France
- Height: 1.90 m (6 ft 3 in)
- Position: Forward

Youth career
- 1998–2000: Rouen

Senior career*
Years	Team	Apps	(Gls)
2000–2004	Rouen		
2004–2007	Bois-Guillaume	97	(9)
2007–2012	Quevilly	89	(33)
2012–2013	Orléans	19	(1)
2013–2014	Poiré-sur-Vie	24	(2)
2014–2016	Quevilly-Rouen (Note: In 2015, US Quevilly was renamed to US Quevilly-Rouen Métropole.)	48	(14)
2015–2017	Quevilly-Rouen B	11	(0)
2017–2018	Rouen	3	(0)
- * Club domestic league appearances and goals

Joris Colinet (born 27 September 1982) is a French former professional footballer who played as a forward. He played on the professional level in Ligue 2 for Rouen.

== Honours ==
Quevilly

- Coupe de France runner-up: 2011–12
