= Khassimirou Diop =

Senegalese footballer

Personal information
- Date of birth: 28 December 1986 (age 39)
- Place of birth: Dakar, Senegal
- Height: 1.73 m (5 ft 8 in)
- Position: Midfielder

Team information
- Current team: Cholet B

Youth career
- 1999–2006: FC Nantes B

Senior career*
Years	Team	Apps	(Gls)
2006–2011	FC Nantes	5	(0)
2009	→ Aviron Bayonnais (loan)		
2009–2010	→ USJA Carquefou (loan)		
2011–2012	UJA Alfortville	5	(0)
2012–2013	JA Drancy	2	(0)
2013–2015	Cholet	47	(3)
2015–2016	GSI Pontivy	6	(0)
2015–2018	Cholet	35	(1)
2020	Cholet	0	(0)
- * Club domestic league appearances and goals as of 09:28, 14 December 2020 (UTC)

Khassimirou Diop (born 28 December 1986) is a Senegalese footballer and junior-level coach, still registered to play as a midfielder for French side Cholet B.

== Career ==
Diop arrived in France at the age of 13, and joined the training center of FC Nantes. He made his debut at the professional level for Nantes as a second half substitute in the Ligue 1 game against Sochaux on 14 October 2006.

After leaving Nantes he played in the fourth tier with UJA Alfortville and JA Drancy before joining SO Cholet in the fifth tier. He was part of the Cholet side which achieved promotion from Championnat de France Amateur 2 in 2015 and Championnat de France Amateur 2 in 2017. Although he has not played for Cholet's first team since May 2018, he remains available for call-ups while coaching the U10 side, as happened in November 2020.
