= Eglantine Vierzon =

French football club

- Full name: Eglantine Vierzonnaise Football
- Founded: 1937
- Dissolved: 2015
- Ground: Stade Albert Thevenot, Vierzon
- Chairman: Rachid Aït Slimane
- Manager: Mohamed Fahran
Home colours

Eglantine Vierzonnaise Football was a French association football club founded in 1937. They were based in the town of Vierzon and their home stadium was the Stade Albert Thevenot.

The club was dissolved in July 2015.
