= Stevie Riga =

French footballer (born 1989)

Personal information
- Date of birth: 15 September 1989 (age 37)
- Place of birth: Sucy-en-Brie, France
- Height: 1.80 m (5 ft 11 in)
- Position: Defender

Youth career
- Créteil
- 2006–2009: Angers

Senior career*
Years	Team	Apps	(Gls)
2009–2013	Angers	15	(0)
2013	Angers B	3	(0)
2014–2015	Cholet	5	(0)
Total		23	(0)
- * Club domestic league appearances and goals

Stevie Riga (born 15 September 1989) is a French former professional footballer who played as a defender. He made his professional debut for Angers in Ligue 2 on 6 November 2009 in a game against Bastia.
