= Rémi Elissalde =

French footballer (born 1991)

Personal information
- Date of birth: 1 January 1991 (age 35)
- Place of birth: Biarritz, France
- Height: 1.83 m (6 ft 0 in)
- Position: Midfielder

Youth career
- 2008–2010: Bordeaux

Senior career*
Years	Team	Apps	(Gls)
2010–2011	Bordeaux	1	(0)
2011–2012	Bayonne	33	(0)
2012–2015	Orléans	44	(0)
2015–2016	Romorantin	18	(0)
2016–2018	Stade Bordelais	46	(1)
2018	C'Chartres	4	(0)
2018–2019	C'Chartres B	14	(0)
- * Club domestic league appearances and goals as of 1 July 2019

Rémi Elissalde (born 1 January 1991) is a French professional footballer who plays as a midfielder. He has previously played in Ligue 1 with Bordeaux and Ligue 2 for Orléans.

== Career statistics ==
As of 9 November 2015.

Appearances and goals by club, season and competition
Club	Season	League			Cup		League Cup		Total	
Club	Season	Division	Apps	Goals	Apps	Goals	Apps	Goals	Apps	Goals
Bordeaux	2010–11	Ligue 1	1	0	0	0	0	0	1	0
Bayonne	2011–12	National	33	0	2	0	0	0	35	0
Orléans	2012–13	National	24	0	3	0	0	0	27	0
Orléans	2013–14	National	16	0	0	0	0	0	16	0
Orléans	2014–15	Ligue 2	4	0	2	1	1	0	7	1
Romorantin	2015–16	CFA Group D	9	0	1	0	0	0	10	0
Career total			87	0	8	1	1	0	96	1

== Honours ==
Orléans

- Championnat National: 2013–14
