= 2009–10 Coupe de France 3rd through 4th rounds =

The 2009–10 Coupe de France is the 93rd season of the French most prestigious cup competition, organized by the French Football Federation, and is open to all clubs in French football, as well as clubs from the overseas departments and territories (Guadeloupe, French Guiana, Martinique, Mayotte, New Caledonia, French Polynesia, and Réunion). All of the teams that enter the competition, but were not members of Ligue 1 or Ligue 2, have to compete in the regional qualifying rounds. The regional qualifying rounds determine the number of regional clubs that will earn spots in the 7th round and normally lasts six rounds.

See 2009–10 Coupe de France for details of the rounds from the 7th Round onwards.

== Calendar ==
On 23 June 2009, the French Football Federation announced the calendar for the Coupe de France.

Round	First match date	Fixtures	Clubs	Notes
3rd Round	20 September 2009			Clubs participating in CFA 2 gain entry.
4th Round	4 October 2009			Clubs participating in the CFA gain entry.

All times in the following tables are CET unless otherwise noted.

== Third round ==
Alsace
Date	Kick Off	Home	Result	Away

Aquitaine
Date	Kick Off	Home	Result	Away
19 September	16:00	Langon Castet	0 – 2	Stade Bordelais
19 September	19:00	Prigonrieux FC	0 – 5	SA Merignac
19 September	20:00	Sarlat Marcillac FC	1 – 3	US Lormont
19 September	20:30	AS Pontonx	2 – 0	US Lege Capferret
20 September	15:30	SC Cudos	0 – 5	Oloron FC
20 September	15:30	Gan FC	0 – 5	Stade Mantois
20 September	15:30	AGJA Cauderan	3 – 0	Facture Biganos
20 September	15:30	Le Barp FC	6 – 1	Doazit FC
20 September	15:30	Croises Béarn	3 – 1	La Ribere FC
20 September	15:30	AS Le Taillan	2 – 1	Olympique Pardies
20 September	15:30	ASC Pessac Alouette	3 – 3; 2 - 4 pen.	Olympique Biscarrosse
20 September	15:30	Pierroton Cestas	1 – 2	AV Mourenxois
20 September	15:30	J. Villenave	4 – 0	US Talence
20 September	15:30	SJ Macau	1 – 5	EJ Saint Medard
20 September	15:30	Pau Bleuets	1 – 2	Saint Pierre-du-Mont
20 September	15:30	JC Saint Seurin	0 – 6	Merignac Arlac E.
20 September	15:30	Antonne-le-Change	1 – 6	SU Agen
20 September	15:30	Petit Bersac FC	0 – 6	Trelissac FC
20 September	15:30	Portes Entre 2 Mers	0 – 4	Coulounieix Chamiers
20 September	15:30	Saint Sulpic Cameyrac	2 – 0	Montpon. Menesplet FC
20 September	15:30	Estuaire Haute Gironde	2 – 1	Villeneuve-sur-Lot
20 September	15:30	Saint Andre Cubzac	2 – 2; 3 - 2 pen.	Arsac Le Pian
20 September	15:30	Coteaux Libournais	1 – 0	RC Chambéry
20 September	15:30	CA Riberac	1 – 3	US Izon
20 September	15:30	FC Gironde Reole	2 – 3	Martignas Illac
20 September	15:30	Razac Isle	0 – 5	Entente Blanquefort
20 September	15:30	US Labrede	3 – 0	JS Saint Emilion
20 September	15:30	US Pointe-du-Medoc	2 – 0	Marmande FC
20 September	15:30	FC Vallee Gamage	0 – 4	ES Ambaresienne
20 September	15:30	Agen FC	1 – 3	Bergerac Foot
20 September	15:00	Sporting Andernos	2 – 3	ES Canejan
22 September	20:00	JA Biarritz	3 – 2 a.e.t	JA Dax
27 September	15:00	Boucou Elan	–	RC Bordeaux
27 September	15:30	Hasparren FC	–	Bayonne Cr.
27 September	15:30	FC Bassin d'Arcachon	–	AS Tarnos

Auvergne
Date	Kick Off	Home	Result	Away
19 September	17:00	Saint Julien Chapteuil	0 – 5	Le Puy F Auvergne 43
19 September	19:00	SC Saint Pourcain	0 – 0; 3 - 4 pen.	Lignerolles Lavault
19 September	19:00	SA Thiers	1 – 0	Lezoux FC
19 September	20:00	SC Gannat	1 – 3 a.e.t	AS Ferrieres
19 September	20:00	Massiac Molompize	1 – 2	AS Sansac
19 September	20:00	Cebazat Sports	2 – 3	FCUS Ambert
20 September	15:00	AS Gennetines	0 – 1	US Saint Georges
20 September	15:00	AS Montmarault	1 – 3	AS Varennes
20 September	15:00	Montlucon Ilets	0 – 1	RC Vichy
20 September	15:00	CS Cosne	0 – 1	AS DOmerat
20 September	15:00	Entente Moulins Yzeure	1 – 0 a.e.t	Souvigny FC
20 September	15:00	Billy-Crechy	2 – 1 a.e.t	Stade Saint Yorre
20 September	15:00	FC Mayotte Bellerive	3 – 5	Saint Gervais Auvergne
20 September	15:00	US Abrest	0 – 3	USP Commentary
20 September	15:00	Saint Germain Fosses	2 – 1	Riom FC
20 September	15:00	AS Trevol	0 – 2	AA Lapalisse
20 September	15:00	FC Entente Chataigneraie	2 – 4	US Saint Flour
20 September	15:00	US Marmanhac	3 – 2 a.e.t	Junhac-Montsalvy
20 September	15:00	US Crandelles	2 – 6	AS Espinat
20 September	15:00	Entente Saint Paul-Lac	1 – 2 a.e.t	Ally Mauriac
20 September	15:00	AS Saint Just	0 – 5	US Murat
20 September	15:00	Vezezoux	2 – 1 a.e.t	Saint Germain Laprade
20 September	15:00	Entente Saint Maurice	1 – 4	CO Craponne
20 September	15:00	Espaly FC	0 – 2	Entente Nord Lozère
20 September	15:00	US Blavozy	0 – 2	Combelle Charb.
20 September	15:00	Haute Dordogne	1 – 3	FC Chamalières
20 September	15:00	US Orcet	1 – 3	Clermont Ouvoimoja
20 September	15:00	US Messeix	1 – 0 a.e.t	FA Cendre
20 September	15:00	Perignat-Sarlieve	1 – 1; 5 - 4 pen.	US Beaumont
20 September	15:00	US Mozac	0 – 4	FC Cournon-d'Auvergne
20 September	15:00	Lempdes Sports	2 – 2; 4 - 5 pen.	Martres de Veyre
20 September	15:00	CS Pont-du-Chateau	0 – 1	CS Volvic
20 September	15:00	CS Pont-de-Dore	2 – 4 a.e.t	Esperance Ceyrat
20 September	15:00	Sporting Aulnat	1 – 5	Chappes FF
20 September	15:00	FC Chatel Guyon	1 – 7	Clermont Saint Jacq

Basse-Normandie
Date	Kick Off	Home	Result	Away
19 September	17:00	Bourguebus Sports	0 – 7	SU Dives
19 September	18:30	UFC Argentan	0 – 4	US Alençon 61
19 September	19:30	CA Pontois	1 – 5	FC Bayeux
19 September	20:00	CA Lisieux Pa	2 – 0	CS Orbec
20 September	15:00	RS Saint Sauverais	1 – 3	Agon Coutainvil FC
20 September	15:00	Periers Sports	1 – 0	Conde Sports
20 September	15:00	FC Agneaux	4 – 2	Creances Sports
20 September	15:00	AS Valognes	0 – 3	ES Coutances
20 September	15:00	AS Querquevillaise	1 – 2	FC Saint-Lô Manche
20 September	15:00	US Ducey	0 – 1	US Saint Quentin-Homme
20 September	15:30	ASPTT Caen	3 – 5	OS Maladrerie
20 September	15:00	La Brehalaise	1 – 9	SC Herouvillais
20 September	15:00	USCO Sourdeval	1 – 1; 5 - 6 pen.	US Thaon Fvm
20 September	15:00	CS Villedieu	0 – 2	USON MOndeville
20 September	15:00	CO Ceauce	0 – 3	ASPTT Argentan
20 September	15:00	Olympique Alençon	0 – 3	FC Vimoutiers
20 September	15:00	S. Saint Georges Domf.	3 – 1	AS Courteille Alençon
20 September	15:00	JS Flerienne	1 – 3	AJS Ouistreham
20 September	15:00	ES Forges Radon	0 – 1	FC Du-Pays-Aiglon
20 September	15:00	J. Fertoise BT	3 – 4	AS Passais Saint Fraimb
20 September	15:00	Lystrienne Sportive	0 – 3 a.e.t	FC Equeurdr. Hainnev
20 September	15:00	ES Estuaire Touques	3 – 4 a.e.t	US Saint Pairaise
20 September	15:00	RSG Courselles	1 – 1; 9 - 10 pen.	AF Virois
20 September	15:00	AS De Rots	0 – 3	US Granville
20 September	15:00	ES Airan Mery Corbon	3 – 2	US Pont L'Eveque
20 September	15:00	LC Bretteville-Odon	0 – 1	FC Flers
20 September	15:00	FC Argences	3 – 1	ESFC Falaise
20 September	15:00	ESI May-sur-Orne	0 – 5	ASC Lexoviens
20 September	15:00	ES Thury Harcourt	0 – 3	FC Bretteville-Laize
20 September	15:00	CS Carentanais	0 – 3	ES Pointe Hague

Bourgogne
Date	Kick Off	Home	Result	Away
19 September	18:30	Autun FC	1 – 0	US Cosne
19 September	19:30	JS Creches	0 – 2	Snid
20 September	15:00	La Chapelle Guinchay	1 – 2	US Bourbon
20 September	15:00	JF Palinges	3 – 5 a.e.t	USC Paray
20 September	15:00	Etang-Arroux	1 – 0	Dun Sornin Foot
20 September	15:00	FCA Digoin	1 – 1; 5 - 4 pen.	UF Maconnais
20 September	15:00	Olympique Dornes Neuville	0 – 1 a.e.t	JO Le Creusot
20 September	15:00	Nevers Football	4 – 1	US Coulanges Nevers
20 September	15:00	US Luzy Millay	1 – 3 a.e.t	RC Nevers-Challuy
20 September	15:00	Chevannes FC	0 – 0; 5 - 3 pen.	UF La Machine
20 September	15:00	US Cercucoise	0 – 0; 4 - 5 pen.	US La Charite
20 September	15:00	FC Chalon	1 – 0	FR Saint Marcel
20 September	15:00	JS Maconnaise	2 – 0	Mercurey
20 September	15:00	Branges	2 – 1 a.e.t	CS Sainte de Ruffey
20 September	15:00	US Crissey	1 – 1; 3 - 4 pen.	Beaune FC
20 September	15:00	Aberg. Cuisery	2 – 4	AS Sornay
20 September	15:00	Marsannay	3 – 1	CS Auxonne
20 September	15:00	Cessey	0 – 4	SC Selongey
20 September	15:00	LR Chatenoy	3 – 0	Longvic
20 September	15:00	USC Dijon	1 – 3	US Meursault
20 September	15:00	ES La Pontailler	0 – 2	CL Chenove
20 September	15:00	FC Dijon Parc	1 – 2	AS Quetigny
20 September	15:00	ES Saint Florentin	0 – 5	Sens FC
20 September	15:00	Châtillon Colombine	0 – 0; 1 - 4 pen.	Montbard Venarey
20 September	15:00	Saint Georges	3 – 1	ES Appoigny
20 September	15:00	Stade Auxerre	8 – 1	Semur Epoisses
20 September	15:00	CO Avallon	0 – 0; 3 - 4 pen.	Sens Francomaghreb

Bretagne
Kick Off	Home	Result	Away

Centre
Date	Kick Off	Home	Result	Away
19 September	19:00	FC Drouais	2 – 1 a.e.t	Blois Foot 41
19 September	19:00	USE Avoine	1 – 0	SC Malesherbes
19 September	20:30	Vineuil SF	4 – 1	FCO Saint-Jean-de-la-Ruelle
20 September	15:00	USM Saran	1 – 0	Bourges Football
20 September	15:00	AS Monts	1 – 2	Saint-Pryve Saint-Hilaire FC
20 September	15:00	J3S Amilly	6 – 1	HB Chartres
20 September	15:00	USM Montargis	1 – 2 a.e.t	CCSP Tours
20 September	15:00	ES Bourges Moulon	0 – 4	FC Déolois
20 September	15:00	AS Chanceaux	0 – 2	FC Chartres
20 September	15:00	US Joue Portugais	1 – 2 a.e.t	AC Amboise
20 September	15:00	AS Luisant	0 – 2	Joué-lès-Tours FCT
20 September	15:00	ESCALE Orléans	1 – 3 a.e.t	Vierzon Foot 18
20 September	15:00	USM Olivier	2 – 2; 4 - 3 pen.	Selles Saint Denis DR
20 September	15:00	Saint-Avertin Sports	2 – 1	Saint Pierre des Corps
20 September	15:00	US Montgivray	3 – 1 a.e.t	CSM Sully-sur-Loire
20 September	15:00	SMOC Saint Jean Braye	2 – 0	Amicale de Lucé
20 September	15:00	ES Vineuil Brion	0 – 3	FC Saint-Jean-le-Blanc
20 September	15:00	La Riche Tours	1 – 3 a.e.t	OC Chateaudun
20 September	15:00	US Villedieu	1 – 2	AS Gien
20 September	15:00	AS Bourges Portugais	10 – 1	FC2M Martizay
20 September	15:00	US Le Pechereau	2 – 0	Châteauroux Touv.
20 September	15:00	Amicale Épernon	1 – 2	AS Salbris
20 September	15:00	SL Vierzon Chaillot	1 – 0	US Selles-sur-Cher
20 September	15:00	AS Fondettes	0 – 3	ES Veretz Larcay
20 September	15:00	Amicale Gallardon	3 – 0	ES Villebarou
20 September	15:00	FC Saint Doulchard	0 – 1	FC Ouest Tourangeau
20 September	15:00	CA Duzouer Le Marche	3 – 3; 5 - 4 pen.	EB Saint Cyr-sur-Loire
20 September	15:00	US Aigurande	1 – 2	SC Azay Cheille
20 September	15:00	US Saint Cyr-en-Val	3 – 1	SC Vatan

(Poitou-Charentes) Centre-Ouest
Date	Kick Off	Home	Result	Away
19 September	20:00	FC Angoulême Chte	2 – 1 a.e.t	US Niort Saint Florent
19 September	20:00	SC Mouthiers	2 – 3	AS Aiffres
19 September	20:00	FC Nersac	1 – 2	Saint Maurice Gencay
19 September	20:30	Chadenac Marignac	1 – 3	Mauze-sur-Mignon
19 September	20:00	FC Perigny	0 – 2	Thouars Foot 79
19 September	20:00	US Rons	0 – 3	La Ligugéenne Football
19 September	20:00	Pont L'Abbe D'Arnoul	1 – 4	Saint Georges Les Bail
19 September	20:00	Saint Jean D'Angely	7 – 1	US Migne Auxances
19 September	20:00	CA Egletons	2 – 0	US Saint Fiel
19 September	20:00	CF Lubersac Auvezere	3 – 1	EF Aubussonnais
19 September	20:00	CA Meymac	1 – 0	JA Isle
19 September	20:00	Sainte Fortunade Lagard	1 – 5	Limoges FC
19 September	20:00	US Courlay	0 – 4	US Chauvigny
19 September	20:00	ES Buxerolles	3 – 2	FC Bressuire
19 September	20:00	Cenon-sur-Vienne	2 – 1	US Combranssiere
19 September	20:00	SO Châtellerault	2 – 0	FC Laleu La Rochelle
19 September	20:00	US Civray	0 – 3	CS Angoulême Leroy
19 September	20:00	ES Saint Benoit	2 – 1	AS Cozes
19 September	20:00	Saint Savin Saint Germain	2 – 0	Le Tallud Eveil
20 September	15:30	CA Rilhac Rancon	4 – 3 a.e.t	ES Guéretoise
20 September	15:00	Jarhac Sports	2 – 3	AFC Royan Vaux
20 September	15:00	ES Mornac	0 – 4	FC Chauray
20 September	15:00	JS Suris	0 – 9	CS Feytiat
20 September	15:00	AFP Arvert	2 – 2; 6 - 5 pen.	CS Bussac Foret
20 September	15:00	ES Ecoyeux Venerand	0 – 10	UA Cognac
20 September	15:00	La Rochelle Opmvs	0 – 2	Poitiers FC
20 September	15:00	Matha Avenir	2 – 1	FC Confolens
20 September	15:00	US Saint Clement	2 – 2; 5 - 6 pen.	AS Sixe-sur-Vienne
20 September	15:00	AS Tulle Portugais	4 – 2	AS Ladignac Le Long
20 September	15:00	USS Merinchal	0 – 4	ESA Brive
20 September	15:00	CA Saint Aubin Le Cloud	2 – 3	Châtellerault Portugais
20 September	15:00	Esperance Terves	6 – 1	FC La Jarrie
20 September	15:00	FC Fleure	2 – 1	US Rochefort
20 September	15:00	JS Nieuil L'Espoir	0 – 4 a.e.t	FC Rochefort
20 September	15:00	ES Poitiers 3 Cites	1 – 3	SA Mauze Rigne
20 September	15:00	US Scorbe Clairvaux	1 – 2	RC Parthenay Viennay
20 September	15:00	Limoges La Bastide	0 – 0; 3 - 1 pen.	ES Nonards
20 September	15:00	SC Limoges Vigenal	3 – 1	USC Bourganeuf
20 September	15:00	AG Pierre Buffiere	3 – 2	Corrèze Tulle Foot

Champagne-Ardenne
Date	Kick Off	Home	Result	Away
20 September	15:00	US Revin	2 – 1	FC Bogny
20 September	15:00	Prix Les Mézières	1 – 2 a.e.t	OFC Charleville
20 September	15:00	Carignan Linay	0 – 6	Rethel Sportif
20 September	15:00	Bourg Rocroi	1 – 3	Sedan Torcy
20 September	15:00	FC Chooz	6 – 2	US Balan
20 September	15:00	US Bazeilles	2 – 0	Douzy-qui-Vive
20 September	15:00	SC Tinqueux	5 – 0	Nueville This
20 September	15:00	CA Ay	2 – 1	Avize Grauves
20 September	15:00	SC Marnaval	7 – 0	SC Montmirail
20 September	15:00	Ambonnay Bouzy	1 – 3 a.e.t	Reims Murigny Franco
20 September	15:00	RCC Épernay	5 – 0	ES Fagnieres
20 September	15:00	Nord Champagne	1 – 0	AS Asfeld
20 September	15:00	AS Taissy	4 – 1	Rilly La Montagne
20 September	15:00	SA Sezanne	6 – 2	Cernay Les Reims
20 September	15:00	MJEP Cormontreuil	3 – 1	FC Nogentais
20 September	15:00	Saint Martin La Veuve	0 – 2	Vaux-sur-Blaise
20 September	15:00	AFM Romilly	1 – 2	Reims Sainte Anne
20 September	15:00	CO Saint Dizier	7 – 1	Pargny-sur-Saulx
20 September	15:00	Olympique Châlons	2 – 5 a.e.t	Bignicourt-Saulx
20 September	15:00	Châlons Marocains	1 – 0	Faux Vesigneul Pogny
20 September	15:00	FC Chaumont	3 – 1	FC Saint Mesmin
20 September	15:00	Etoile Chapelaine	3 – 1	Prauthoy Vaux
20 September	15:00	CO Langres	1 – 0	AS Nogent
20 September	15:00	Diane D'Eurville	1 – 1; 5 - 4 pen.	Foyer Barsequanais
20 September	15:00	US Eclaron Valcourt	3 – 0	Sainte Geosmes
20 September	15:00	JS Vaudoise	1 – 3	JSFC Saint Julien
20 September	15:00	Corgirnon Chaudenay	2 – 3 a.e.t	Andelot Rimaucourt
20 September	15:00	Troyes Municipaux	0 – 2	RSCS Chapelle

Corsica
Date	Kick Off	Home	Result	Away
20 September	15:00	ÉF Bastia	3 – 1	Gallia CL
20 September	15:00	US Ghisonaccia	2 – 1	Antisanti
20 September	15:00	FCA Calvi	9 – 0	Corbara SR
20 September	15:00	FC Bastelicaccia	1 – 0 a.e.t	USC Corte
20 September	15:00	AS Casinca	3 – 0	EPORS
20 September	15:00	FC Lucciana	0 – 6	CA Propriano
20 September	15:00	AS Porto Vecchio	1 – 0	AS Nebbiu CD
20 September	15:00	Sud FC	1 – 2	Borgo FC
20 September	15:00	AJ Biguglia	2 – 0	Costa
20 September	15:00	AS Furiani-Agliani	3 – 0	EC Bastiais
20 September	15:00	FB Ile Rousse	1 – 0	Prunelli FC
20 September	15:00	FC Aleria	4 – 7	AS Pieve

Franche-Comté
Date	Kick Off	Home	Result	Away
19 September	19:30	Soane Mamirolle	2 – 3 a.e.t	Poligny
19 September	19:30	Port-sur-Saône	0 – 4	AS Audincourt
19 September	19:30	L'Isle-sur-Doubs	4 – 0	Noidanais
19 September	19:30	Coteaux-de-Seille	0 – 5	AS Ornans
19 September	19:30	Jura Lacs Foot	3 – 1	Aman.Bol.Chan
19 September	19:30	Frasne	0 – 4	Lons Le Saunier
19 September	19:30	Levier	1 – 3	Jura Dolois Football
20 September	15:00	Charquemont	0 – 4 a.e.t	AS Grandvillars
20 September	15:00	Larians-et-Munans	2 – 1	Vallee du Breuchin
20 September	15:00	JS Lure	1 – 4	Roche-Novillars
20 September	15:00	Montbeliard Foot	2 – 2; 4 - 5 pen.	Pierrefontaine Lavir
20 September	15:00	Seloncourt	0 – 1	Morteau Montlebon
20 September	15:00	AS Bavilliers	2 – 5	Bethoncourt
20 September	15:00	Herimoncourt	4 – 3	Saint Loup Corbenay
20 September	15:00	Haute Lizaine	0 – 3	ASM Belfort
20 September	15:00	Rougegoutte	4 – 3	Pont Roide Vermondan
20 September	15:00	SG Hericourt	0 – 3	Sud Belfort
20 September	15:00	Orchamps Vennes	1 – 3	Baume L'Dames
20 September	15:00	ES Belleherbe	2 – 7	Mezire
20 September	15:00	Nord Territoire	1 – 3	Luxeuil
20 September	15:00	Val-de-Loue	2 – 0 a.e.t	Thise-Chalezeule
20 September	15:00	Athletic Club Besançon	2 – 1	Aiglepierre
20 September	15:00	Combeaufontaine Lavo	0 – 2	PS Besançon
20 September	15:00	4 Rivieres 70	2 – 4 a.e.t	CA Pontarlier
20 September	15:00	Perrousienne	1 – 2	Saint Vit
20 September	15:00	Dannemarie	2 – 2; 5 - 4 pen.	Champagnole
20 September	15:00	Rochefort Amange	2 – 2; 5 - 4 pen.	Jura Nord Foot
20 September	15:00	Rioz-Etuz-Cussey	0 – 2	Bresse Jura Foot
20 September	15:00	Morbier	2 – 6	Arbois

French Guiana
Date	Kick Off	Home	Result	Away

French Polynesia
Date	Kick Off	Home	Result	Away
30 May	20:00	Tahiti U-20	1 – 0	AS Vaiete
10 June	20:00	AS Vaiete	2 – 3	Tahiti U-20
Tahiti U-20 advance 4 – 2 on aggregate
30 May	20:00	AS Temanava	2 – 3	AS Manu-Ura
10 June	20:00	AS Manu-Ura	2 – 0	AS Temanava
Manu-Ura advance 5 – 2 on aggregate

Guadeloupe
Date	Kick Off	Home	Result	Away
19 September	20:00	US Sainte Rose	1 – 2	La Gauloise de Basse-Terre
19 September	20:00	Siroco Abymes	1 – 0	L'Etoile de Morne-à-l'Eau
19 September	20:00	US Baie-Mahault	–	Solidarité Scolaire
20 September	20:00	Dynamo Le Moule	0 – 3	Jeunesse Evolution
30 September	20:00	Stade Lamentois	–	Evoculas
30 September	20:00	CS Le Moule	–	AS Nenuphars
30 September	20:00	Amical Club	–	Equinoxe

Haute-Normandie
Date	Kick Off	Home	Result	Away
19 September	17:00	AC Bolbec	0 – 1	FC Dieppe
20 September	15:00	Sporting Gasny	2 – 3 a.e.t	Évreux FC
20 September	15:00	Courbepine Plasnes	1 – 0	FC Grand Quevilly
20 September	15:00	Saint Marcel Football	2 – 0	Mesnil Franqueville
20 September	15:00	Pavilly	0 – 2 a.e.t	RC Caudebec
20 September	15:00	ASPTT Évreux	1 – 3	Saint Paul Romilly
20 September	15:00	Illiers L'Eve	3 – 1	US Etrepagny
20 September	15:00	AS Vesly	2 – 7	USF Fecamp
20 September	15:00	Gruchet-Valas	1 – 3 a.e.t	ES Normanville
20 September	15:00	SC Haute Frileuse	2 – 3	FC Saint Aubin Les El.
20 September	15:00	FC Le Trait Duclair	0 – 1	US Pont L'Arche
20 September	15:00	Neuve Lyre	0 – 1 a.e.t	Montivilliers
20 September	15:00	JS Arnieres	5 – 2	Doudeville
20 September	15:00	SC Quittebeuf	1 – 4	AS Luneray
20 September	15:00	Évreux Portugais	1 – 1; 5 - 6 pen.	CMS Oissel
20 September	15:00	Cany	2 – 3	Haute Caucriauville
20 September	15:00	Houlme Bondev	2 – 0	ESM Gonfreville
20 September	15:00	Freville	1 – 3	Etoutteville
20 September	15:00	AC Saint Romain	2 – 2; 4 - 2 pen.	Barentin
20 September	15:00	Basse-Saane	3 – 0	Haute Mont Gailla
20 September	15:00	Fauville	1 – 2	GCO Bihorel
20 September	15:00	Beaumont	1 – 4 a.e.t	Mont-Saint-Aignan
20 September	15:00	Criel-sur-Mer	7 – 2 a.e.t	AS Gournay
20 September	15:00	US Lillebonne	2 – 1	Eu. FC
20 September	15:00	Crique. Cap-de-Caux	0 – 1	CA Pont Audemer
20 September	15:00	Londinieres	1 – 3	Plateau-Assoc
20 September	15:00	Totes	1 – 4	SC Pont Couronne

Île-de-France
Date	Kick Off	Home	Result	Away
19 September	20:00	Corbeil Essonnes	1 – 0	FC Melun
19 September	20:00	Paray FC	0 – 1 a.e.t	FC Gobelins
20 September	15:00	ASA Montereau	–	Saint-Germain Saint-Pierre
20 September	15:00	ES Nangis	3 – 2	US Grigny
20 September	15:00	FC Bourget	2 – 1	FC Franconville PB
20 September	15:00	Boussy Saint Antoine	0 – 2	Maccabi Paris
20 September	15:00	ES Montreuil	1 – 0	Bry FC
20 September	15:00	ASC Velizy	4 – 1	STOP La Galere
20 September	15:00	ESP Paris 19	0 – 0; 5 - 6 pen.	Val Yerres Crosne
20 September	15:00	US Persan	1 – 1; 4 - 2 pen.	EST Solitaire Paris
20 September	15:00	FC Plessis Trevise	0 – 4	US Torcy
20 September	15:00	AS Chatou	1 – 3	CSL Aulnay
20 September	15:00	CO Vincennois	3 – 1	Saint-Michel Sports
20 September	15:00	FC Orsay Bures	2 – 3	Neauphle-Pont.
20 September	15:00	AS Meudon	2 – 0	AS Montigny-le-Baux
20 September	15:00	FC Cap Vert	0 – 2	CS Mennecy
20 September	15:00	RC Fontainebleau	4 – 1 a.e.t	Sainte-Geneviève Sports
20 September	15:00	LSO Colombes	0 – 1	Goussainville Portugais
20 September	15:00	Aubervilliers Jeunes	3 – 3; 5 - 4 pen.	Thillay Vaud Herland
20 September	15:00	Villennes Orgeval	3 – 2	Jouy-le-Moutier FC
20 September	15:00	US Fontenay-sur-Bois	2 – 1	SFB Le Blanc Mesnil
20 September	15:00	US Ponthierry	2 – 4	SC Évry Ville
20 September	15:00	FC Rueil Malmaison	0 – 2	FC Versailles 78
20 September	15:00	FC Courcouronnes	3 – 2	Enfants de Passy
20 September	15:00	Sporting Morsang	0 – 2	CA Paris-Charenton
20 September	15:00	Rambouillet Yvelines	5 – 5; 4 - 3 pen.	SS Voltaire Chat. M.
20 September	15:00	US Ezanville Ecouen	0 – 4	CM Aubervilliers
20 September	15:00	ALJ Limay	3 – 3; 4 - 5 pen.	Conflans FC
20 September	15:00	Sporting Montmagny	2 – 1	RSC Montreuil
20 September	15:00	SC Briard	2 – 4 a.e.t	Champigny FC 94
20 September	15:00	AS Bourg-la-Reine	0 – 1	AFC Igny
20 September	15:00	CSM Eaubonne	1 – 6	Tremblay FC
20 September	15:00	AS Lieusaint Foot	0 – 5	FCS Bretigny
20 September	15:00	US Hardicourt	1 – 0	ES Seizieme
20 September	15:00	Claye Souilly Sports	1 – 0	Sucy FC
20 September	15:00	AS Soisy-sur-Seine	1 – 2 a.e.t	Le Mee Foot
20 September	15:00	Saint Quentin Yvelines	1 – 0	Antony Sports
20 September	15:00	AS Bois-de-Arcy	0 – 4	CO Ulis
20 September	15:00	AAS Sarcelles	1 – 2	AF Garenne Colombes
20 September	15:00	AS Bondy	1 – 1; 2 - 3 pen.	CS Meaux
20 September	15:00	ES Nanterre	0 – 2	FC Livry Gargan
20 September	15:00	US Villejuif	0 – 2	JS Suresnes
20 September	15:00	Carrieres Gresillons	0 – 5	AS Saint Ouen L'Aumone
20 September	15:00	FC Chateau Landon	3 – 1	CO Savigny Foot
20 September	15:00	SC Gretz Tournan	0 – 3	AS Choisy-le-Roi
20 September	15:00	ACS Cormellais	3 – 3; 2 - 4 pen.	US Saint Denis
20 September	15:00	US Clichois	2 – 4 a.e.t	VGA Saint Maur F. Masc.
20 September	15:00	US Roissy-en-Brie	4 – 1	AC Bobigny
20 September	15:00	Saint Omer Rosny-sur-Bois	–	Noisiel FC
20 September	15:00	Sèvres FC 92	1 – 1; 3 - 1 pen.	US Palaiseau
20 September	15:00	FC Bussy Saint Georges	0 – 5 a.e.t	FC Villepinte
20 September	15:00	Entente 2m	3 – 1 a.e.t	Saint Denis Cosmo Foot
20 September	15:00	Stade Vanves	1 – 3	FC Issy-les-Maulx
20 September	15:00	Draveil FC	2 – 1	CA Hay-les-Roses
20 September	15:00	US Quincy Voisins FC	2 – 4	Neuilly Marne SFC
20 September	15:00	SFC Bailly Noisy	2 – 1	Olympique Neuilly
20 September	15:00	SC Acheres	0 – 1	FC Cergy Pontoise
20 September	15:00	AS Longjumelloise	0 – 5	US Alfortville
20 September	15:00	Champagne SFC 95	1 – 0	USM Villeparisis
20 September	15:00	Courbevoie Sports	1 – 1; 6 - 5 pen.	FC Saint Leu PB 95
20 September	15:00	AS Itteville	1 – 3	Nogent-sur-Marne FC
20 September	15:00	FC Dammarie-les-Lys	0 – 1	AS Orly
20 September	15:00	ES Saint Prix	1 – 3	AS Poissy
20 September	15:00	US Ormesson	0 – 6	FC Morangis Chilly
20 September	15:00	ASC Cachan CO	0 – 2	ES Montgeron
20 September	15:00	Trois Vallees FC	0 – 1	FC Plessis Robinson
20 September	15:00	FAS Herblay	4 – 2 a.e.t	FC Le Chesnay 78
20 September	15:00	Provins FC	0 – 5	US Fleury Merogis
20 September	15:00	CSM Puteaux	0 – 2	FC Porcheville
20 September	15:00	ES Stains F.	0 – 2	FCM Garges Gonesse
20 September	15:00	CN Meulan	0 – 1	Olympique Adamois
20 September	15:00	US Rungis	1 – 2	ASOA Issy
20 September	15:00	CO Champlan Football	1 – 3	ES Vitry
20 September	15:00	US Roissy-en-France	2 – 0	Sartrouville FC
20 September	15:00	Ermont Taverny Cosmo	4 – 0	JS Bondy
20 September	15:00	US Lognes	1 – 3	FC Les Lilas
20 September	15:00	AS Tigery	3 – 0	UJ Boissy
20 September	15:00	FU Fosses	0 – 0; 3 - 2 pen.	Esperance Aulnaysienne
20 September	15:00	AJ Limeil Brevannes	0 – 3	FC Saint Thibau
20 September	15:00	US Ville-de-Avray	0 – 2	Paris Universite Club
20 September	15:00	Saint Brice FC	3 – 5 a.e.t	USM Gagny
20 September	15:00	AC Triel	0 – 1	Olympique Viarmes Asnieres
20 September	15:00	COM Bagneux	0 – 2	FC Vallee 78
20 September	15:30	FC Varennes Jarcy	3 – 8	AAS Fresnes
20 September	15:30	AJSC Nanterre	4 – 0	USM Viroflay
20 September	15:30	US Le Pecq	2 – 4	AC Boulogne Billencourt
20 September	15:30	Épinay Academie	0 – 1	ES Colombienne Foot
20 September	15:30	FC Maisons Alfort	0 – 1 a.e.t	AS Évry Essonne
20 September	15:30	Tremplin Foot	1 – 2	Voisins FC

Languedoc-Roussillon
Date	Kick Off	Home	Result	Away
19 September	17:00	GC Uchaud	0 – 4	Bagnols Pont
19 September	17:30	AS Frontignan	1 – 2	Perpignan Canet FC
19 September	19:30	Saint Hilaire La Jasse	1 – 3	AS Salindres
19 September	20:00	FU Narbonne	1 – 2	Puissalicon Magalas
19 September	21:00	AS Lattes	4 – 0	Aigues Mortes
20 September	15:00	AS Juvignac	0 – 2	Mende Av. Foot Lozère
20 September	15:00	JS Bernis	2 – 0	SC Anduze
20 September	15:00	SC Manduel	0 – 7	LES Uzes Pont du Gard
20 September	15:00	SC Saint L'Abresel	3 – 3; 6 - 5 pen.	Petit Bard Mont FC
20 September	15:00	Entente Saint Clement Mont	1 – 0	AS Montarnaud
20 September	15:00	ES Marguerittes	1 – 3	Nord Lasallien
20 September	15:00	Chastel Nouv	0 – 5	AEC Saint Gilles
20 September	15:00	US Monoblet	3 – 0	MAL Saint Genies
20 September	15:00	AS Cendras	1 – 1; 4 - 2 pen.	ASPTT M.
20 September	15:00	CA Besseges	3 – 6	Valdonnez FC
20 September	15:00	La Gde Motte Pyramid	6 – 0	AS Badaroux
20 September	15:00	US Mauguio Carnon	2 – 0	US Garons
20 September	15:00	CS Marseillan	2 – 0	Alberes-Argeles
20 September	15:00	AS Carc. Marocain	7 – 1	Chalabre FC
20 September	15:00	Thuir FC	4 – 1	FC Alaric Capendu
20 September	15:00	EC Airois	0 – 8	AS Fabregues
20 September	15:00	Sète Le Social	0 – 0; 4 - 2 pen.	AS Béziers
20 September	15:00	FC Sète	1 – 0	Saint Esteve FC
20 September	15:00	FR Caux	1 – 0	Olympique Alenya
20 September	15:00	BECEFC Vallee	4 – 2	Pezenas Tourb
20 September	15:00	FC Carcassonnais	2 – 0	FC Trebes
20 September	15:00	E. Portiragnes Vias	1 – 0	OS Saint Papoul
20 September	15:00	Cazilhac FC	0 – 4	OC Cabestany
20 September	16:30	SO Lansargues	2 – 1	Bezouce 3 Moulins
20 September	17:00	M. Arceaux	0 – 2	Olympique Alès
20 September	18:30	Castelnaudary	0 – 1	Stade Meze

Lorraine
Kick Off	Home	Result	Away

(Pays de la Loire) Maine
Date	Kick Off	Home	Result	Away
19 September	17:00	US Precigne	0 – 3	La Flèche RC
20 September	15:00	ES Bonchamp	6 – 0	AS Laval Bourny
20 September	15:00	ASO Montenay	0 – 4	FA Laval
20 September	15:00	US Villaines Juhel	0 – 3	CA Evron
20 September	15:00	Landivy Pontmain	0 – 1 a.e.t	FC Stade Mayenne
20 September	15:00	Louverné Sports	2 – 1	Sille Le Guillaume
20 September	15:00	Saint Pierre des Land.	1 – 3 a.e.t	US Change
20 September	15:00	ASL L'Huisserie	0 – 1	Brulon Patriote
20 September	15:00	US Laval	0 – 2	Chateau Gont. Anc.
20 September	15:00	ASPTT Laval	0 – 5	US Saint Berthevin
20 September	15:00	AS Loigne-sur-Mayenne	0 – 8	Sablé FC
20 September	15:00	US Force	2 – 0	FC Chateau Gontier
20 September	15:00	AS Saint Aignan-sur-Roe	0 – 3	AS Laval Maghreb
20 September	15:00	ES Craon	0 – 1	AS Louvigné
20 September	15:00	US Méral Cossé	6 – 2	Saint Ouen des Toits
20 September	15:00	ES Concerre	1 – 3	US Vibraye
20 September	15:00	Sainte Jamme-Sarthe Sports	0 – 4	Saint Mars La Briere
20 September	15:00	US Le Luart	1 – 2	Tennie Saint Symphorien
20 September	15:00	Saint Saturnin-Arche	0 – 2	SA Mamers
20 September	15:00	SS Souge Le Ganelon	3 – 1 a.e.t	Bonnetable Paterne
20 September	15:00	La Suze FC	2 – 2; 3 - 2 pen.	JS Coulaines
20 September	15:00	Mulsanne-Teloche	1 – 4	VS La Ferte
20 September	15:00	AS Saint Paterne	0 – 3	Le Mans Sablons
20 September	15:00	Le Mans Glonnieres	0 – 1	Ecommoy FC
20 September	15:00	Savigne L'Eveque FC	0 – 4	Arnage-Pontlieue
20 September	15:00	Monce-en-Belin	2 – 2; 4 - 5 pen.	AS La Milesse
20 September	15:00	AS Ruaudin	0 – 5	Le Mans Villaret
20 September	15:00	AS Saint Pavace	1 – 2	Chateau-du-Loire
20 September	15:00	USN Spay	3 – 1	JS Le Lude
20 September	15:00	CS Change	3 – 0	Meslay-du-Maine
20 September	15:00	FC Lassay	1 – 1; 4 - 3 pen.	US Aron

Martinique
Date	Kick Off	Home	Result	Away
2 October	20:00	Golden Star	–	CS Case-Pilote
2 October	20:00	RC Rivière-Pilote	–	US Diamantinoise
3 October	15:00	Anses Arlets FC	–	US Marinoise
3 October	15:00	Emulation	–	Samaritaine
3 October	15:00	Rapid Club	–	Golden Lion Foot
3 October	15:00	U. des Jeunes de Red	–	US Robert
3 October	15:00	Foy.Rur. Durivage	–	La Gauloise de Trinité
3 October	19:00	Aiglon du Lamentin	–	Club Franciscain

Mayotte
Date	Kick Off	Home	Result	Away
27 June	19:00	FC Dembéni	2 – 3	FC Mtsapéré
27 June	19:00	FC Chiconi	2 – 1	Enf. de Mayotte
27 June	19:00	USPL	1 – 2	ASC Kawéni
27 June	19:00	AJ Kani-Kéli	3 – 2	Miracle du Sud
27 June	19:00	Foudre 2000	2 – 0	Etincelles
27 June	19:00	FC Labattoir	2 – 1	Abeilles
27 June	19:00	Guinée Club	–	Mahabou CS
29 July	19:00	UCS Sada	2 – 5	AS Neige

(Provence-Alpes-Côte d'Azur) Méditerranée
Date	Kick Off	Home	Result	Away
19 September	17:00	AS Gemenosienne	1 – 0	Endoume Marseille
19 September	17:00	Antibes	0 – 3	RC Grasse
19 September	18:00	AS Aixoise	1 – 2	ROS Menton
19 September	18:00	SC Dracenie	1 – 2	Trinité Sport Football Club
19 September	18:00	EP Manosque	0 – 1	GS Consolat
20 September	14:30	ES Fosseenne	1 – 1; 4 - 3 pen.	Olympique Rovenain
20 September	14:30	SC Courthezon	1 – 3 a.e.t	ARS Belsunce
20 September	14:30	US Caderousse	0 – 2	AS Gignacaise
20 September	14:30	US Les Mees	–	Istres Rassuen FC
20 September	14:30	Avignon Foot 84	3 – 2 a.e.t	ESP Pernes
20 September	14:30	CFC Avignon	2 – 1	ES Port Saint Louis
20 September	14:30	EUGA Ardziv	4 – 1 a.e.t	AS Maximoise
20 September	14:30	T. Le Las	4 – 3	US Cagnes
20 September	14:30	ASPTT La Ciota	0 – 2	Cannet Roche
20 September	14:30	Six Fours Le Brusc	1 – 2	JS Saint Jean Beaulieu
20 September	14:30	Saint Zacharie	2 – 1	ES Pennoise
20 September	14:30	US Autre Provence	2 – 4	AS Gardanne
20 September	14:30	Tarascon FC	0 – 2	UA Valettoise
20 September	14:30	FC de Mougins Cote	1 – 0	Carros

Midi-Pyrénées
Date	Kick Off	Home	Result	Away
19 September	18:00	SA La Fleurance	1 – 3	FC Lourdes
19 September	18:00	Saint Clar	1 – 2 a.e.t	UA Vic Fezenzac
19 September	18:00	US Cazeres	Postponed	Golfech-Saint Paul
19 September	18:00	Portet Carrefou	1 – 0	AS Tournefeuille
19 September	18:00	CA Capden Compound	2 – 1	UF Marivalois
19 September	18:00	AC Rodez Aveyron	5 – 2 a.e.t	Bouriane FC
19 September	18:00	FC Pamiers	3 – 1	Lavaur FC
19 September	18:00	FC Castres	1 – 2	Lavelanet Mire. FC
19 September	20:00	JS Carbonne	2 – 0	Olympique Semeac
19 September	20:00	AV Fonsorbes	2 – 3	Tarbes PF
19 September	20:00	US Lavernose BM	1 – 1; 5 - 3 pen.	Auch
19 September	20:00	Entente Canton Aurignac	2 – 3 a.e.t	Saint-Gaudens
19 September	20:00	Boulogne-Peguil	0 – 1 a.e.t	Muret
19 September	20:00	AS Beauzelle	3 – 4	Toulouse Bagatelle
19 September	20:00	US Pibrac	5 – 1 a.e.t	FC Beaumontois
19 September	20:00	Cahors FC	0 – 2	Saint-Alban Omnisport
19 September	20:00	SVD Pradines	1 – 1; 4 - 3 pen.	Onet Le Chatelle
19 September	20:00	JS Bassin Aveyron	2 – 5	Montauban
19 September	20:00	USP Rignac	2 – 1	Luc Primaube FC
19 September	20:00	AS Bressols	0 – 1 a.e.t	Olympique Girou FC
19 September	20:00	AS Lescure	0 – 3	Toulouse Saint James
19 September	20:00	JS Cugnaux	1 – 1; 4 - 2 pen.	Revel
19 September	20:00	Saint Orens FC	2 – 1	OAC Toulouse
19 September	20:00	FC Saix Semalens	2 – 1	Lisle-sur-Tarn FC
19 September	20:00	ASC Rigautou	1 – 3 a.e.t	JSP Mazamet
20 September	15:00	US Simorraine	0 – 2	ES Gimont
20 September	15:00	Galan FC	3 – 4	Olympique Cazes
20 September	15:00	AS Toulouse Mirail	0 – 3	Blagnac FC
20 September	15:00	JS Meauzacaise	2 – 3	US Castanet
20 September	15:00	Saint Geniez D'Olt	4 – 1	Naucellois FC
20 September	15:00	Emulation Nautique	1 – 4	AS Izards

New Caledonia
Date	Kick Off	Home	Result	Away
6 December	20:00	Qanono Sports	1 – 0	AS Kirkitr
6 December	20:00	ES Wetr	2 – 0	USJ Wedrumel
31 January	18:00	USC	1 – 3	AS Kunié
31 January	18:00	St-Louis	0 – 2	JS Ny
7 February	15:00	AS Goa	5 – 4	CO Main Noire
7 February	15:00	AS Poum	4 – 2	ES Houaïlou
7 February	18:00	Gaïtcha	7 – 3	Boulouparis
7 February	15:00	JS Maré	5 – 3	FC Auteuil
7 February	15:00	Tiga Sport	2 – 1	Ravel Sport
7 February	20:00	JS Ny	1 – 5	AS Kunié

Nord-Pas de Calais
Kick Off	Home	Result	Away

Picardie
Date	Kick Off	Home	Result	Away
19 September	16:00	AS Allery 2 A	1 – 2	AC Amiens
19 September	17:00	FC Salency	1 – 11	AS Fresnoy
19 September	17:00	FC Amigny Rouy	0 – 2	US Mouy
19 September	19:00	SC Noyon	2 – 2; 4 - 2 pen.	US Chauny
19 September	19:00	US Breteuil	2 – 0	US Daours
20 September	15:00	FC Vierzy	1 – 3	FC Soissons
20 September	15:00	NES Boue	0 – 3	AC Le Nouvion
20 September	15:00	SAS Moy-de-L'Aisne	0 – 3	Olympique Saint Quentin
20 September	15:00	US Aulnois-sur-Loan	0 – 2	FC Holnon
20 September	15:00	RC Bohain	2 – 5	US Buire Hirson
20 September	15:00	AS Thourotte	3 – 2	AS Étampes
20 September	15:00	ALJ Crepy	0 – 3	FC Chateau Th.
20 September	15:00	ASA Presles	3 – 0	US VErvins
20 September	15:00	US Guignicourt	4 – 1	US Ribemont 02
20 September	15:00	Longueil Ann.	1 – 0 a.e.t	US Laon
20 September	15:00	AS Querrieu	3 – 1	CS Chaumont
20 September	15:00	Marle Sports	1 – 8	CAFC Peronne
20 September	15:00	ASP Neslois	2 – 0	RC Clermont
20 September	15:00	AF Fayet	1 – 2	USM Senlis
20 September	15:00	ES Sainte Emilie	3 – 2	BCVF Club
20 September	15:00	US Ham	0 – 5	FC Chambly
20 September	15:00	Amiens Pigeonnier	7 – 4	CS Liancourt
20 September	15:00	Amiens FC	3 – 3; 1 - 4 pen.	Sporting Albert
20 September	15:00	US Gouvieux	4 – 1	ASC Morienval
20 September	15:00	AS Milonaise	0 – 3	US Lamorlaye
20 September	15:00	Choisy-au-Bac	0 – 2	US Roye
20 September	15:00	AS Lacroix Saint Ouen	3 – 1	AC Montdidier
20 September	15:00	AS Allonne	1 – 4	AFC Creil
20 September	15:00	AS Saint Remy	1 – 1; 4 - 1 pen.	AS Plailly
20 September	15:00	AC Mers	0 – 1	Saint Just E. Chausse
20 September	15:00	AS Silly Le Long	2 – 3	Noyers Saint Martin
20 September	15:00	AS Saint Sauveur	2 – 3	US Nogent 60
20 September	15:00	Arsenal Club	2 – 3	ICS Crecois
20 September	15:00	FC Vineuil Saint Firmin	0 – 4	US Etouy
20 September	15:00	AS Evoissons	0 – 11	US Chantilly
20 September	15:00	US Balagny	2 – 0	USR Saint Crepin
20 September	15:00	RC Amiens	1 – 4	US Chevrieres
20 September	15:00	ES Duvy	3 – 1	CO Beauvais
20 September	15:00	SC Songeons	0 – 5	CS Villeneuve
20 September	15:00	RC Doullens	3 – 2 a.e.t	US Ailly-Somme
20 September	15:00	Beauvais Portugais	1 – 3	SC Abbeville
20 September	15:00	US Friville	3 – 1	CS Crecy
20 September	15:00	US Le Boisle	7 – 2	ASL Saveuse
20 September	15:00	Croisien Av.	0 – 3	Saint Vast 3vb
20 September	15:00	AS Saint Sauveur 80	0 – 1	SC Conty
20 September	15:00	US Crèvecœur	1 – 0	AS Gamaches
20 September	15:00	US Quend	3 – 4	Marseille-en-Bvsis
20 September	15:00	US Camon	2 – 2; 3 - 0 pen.	US Pont Saint Maxence
20 September	15:00	FC Mareuil Caubert	1 – 1; 2 - 3 pen.	Amiens Montieres
20 September	15:00	AAE Nibas	1 – 5	AC Hermes Bertholemy
20 September	15:00	US Meru	1 – 2	FC Saint Valery

Réunion
Date	Kick Off	Home	Result	Away
17 July	20:30	SS Gauloise	5 – 6	SS Rivière Sport
17 July	20:30	JS Saint-Pierroise	2 – 1	FC Avirons
18 July	20:00	AS Marsouins	0 – 1	L'USST
18 July	20:00	CO Ter Saint	0 – 0; 4 - 2 pen.	SS Capricorne
18 July	20:00	SS Saint-Louisienne	0 – 1	Saint Paulois FC
18 July	20:00	SS Jeanne d'Arc	1 – 2	SS Excelsior
18 July	20:00	FC Saint-Denis	4 – 2	ES Suzanne Bagat
18 July	20:00	US Saint Marie	3 – 2	Saint-Denis Ecole de Foot

Rhône-Alpes
Kick Off	Home	Result	Away

== Fourth round ==
Alsace
Date	Kick Off	Home	Result	Away

Aquitaine
Date	Kick Off	Home	Result	Away
3 October	19:00	Bergerac Football	0 – 0; 4 - 2 pen.	Stade Montois
3 October	19:00	Stade Bordelais	0 – 1	SU Agen
3 October	19:30	Oloron FC	1 – 1; 5 - 4 pen.	Olympique Biscarrosse
3 October	20:00	Boucau Elan	6 – 2	Croises Béarn
3 October	20:00	AS Pontonx	1 – 4	Pau FC
4 October	15:30	US Lormont	0 – 4	FC Libourne-Saint-Seurin
4 October	15:30	AS Tarnos	1 – 0 a.e.t	Genêts Anglet
4 October	15:30	Martignas Illac	1 – 2	EJ Saint Medard
4 October	15:30	Bayonne Croises	1 – 1; 9 - 8 pen.	JA Biarritz
4 October	15:30	AV Mourenxois	2 – 2; 3 - 4 pen.	J. Villenave
4 October	15:30	Saint Pierre du Mont	0 – 2	Saint Sulpice Cameyrac
4 October	15:30	US Izon	0 – 2	SA Merignac
4 October	15:30	Coteaux Libournais Foot	2 – 4	Saint Andre Cubzac
4 October	15:30	Estuaire Haute Gironde	1 – 2 a.e.t	AGJA Cauderon
4 October	15:30	ES Canejan	2 – 0	Merignac Arlac E.
4 October	15:30	Le Barp FC	0 – 4	Blanquefort E.
4 October	15:30	AS Le Taillan	0 – 2	US Labrede
4 October	15:30	ES Ambaresienne	1 – 1; 9 - 8 pen.	US Pointe-du-Medoc
4 October	15:30	Coulounieix Chamiers	0 – 3	Trélissac FC

(Pays de la Loire) Atlantique
Date	Kick Off	Home	Result	Away
3 October	15:00	VF La Roche-sur-Yon	2 – 3	AC Pouzages
3 October	15:00	La Chapelle Marais	0 – 0; 1 - 4 pen.	USJA Carquefou
3 October	17:00	Etoile Clisson	0 – 3	Vendée Luçon Football
3 October	18:30	Aizenay Fran.	0 – 2	SJA Le Poiré-sur-Vie
3 October	20:00	La Roche-sur-Yon Robret	1 – 4	Vendée Fontenay Foot
4 October	15:00	FCJA Jard Avrille	0 – 3	GS Saint Sebastien
4 October	15:00	Angers Lac-de-Maine	2 – 3	FC Belligne Saint Sauvier
4 October	15:00	Saint-Germain Val Moine	2 – 3	FC Donges
4 October	15:00	FE Trelaze	0 – 1 a.e.t	SO Cholet
4 October	15:00	JA Maulevrier	0 – 1	ARC Tillieres
4 October	15:00	Les Landes Genusson	0 – 2	Olympique Saumur FC
4 October	15:00	OS Nozay	1 – 2	Saint-Fulgent La Vigil.
4 October	15:00	JF Saint-Prouant	0 – 3	Stade Saint Nazaire
4 October	15:00	Saint Martin Avire Louv	1 – 9	Chateaubriant Volt
4 October	15:00	Orvault Sport	4 – 2	La Baule Pouliguen U
4 October	15:00	Maisdon Sevre Maine	0 – 2 a.e.t	La Haie-Fouass. A
4 October	15:00	ES Brissac Aubance	1 – 3	Bouchermaine
4 October	15:00	Nantes Metal Sports	1 – 2	FC Beaupreau
4 October	15:00	FC Brains Boiseau	0 – 1	FC Montaigu
4 October	15:00	AC Nort-sur-Erdre	3 – 2	Angers Intrepid
4 October	15:00	Les Lucs-sur-Boulogne	0 – 1	FC Challans
4 October	15:00	US Thouare	1 – 6	Les Herbiers VF
4 October	15:00	ASI Murs Erigne	1 – 0	USSA Vertou
4 October	15:00	Les Rosiers Gennes	0 – 2	La Romagne Roussay
4 October	15:00	US Pont Saint Martin	1 – 4	Saint Marc-sur-Mer Foot
4 October	15:00	AC Chapelain La Chappelle	2 – 3 a.e.t	AS La Chataigneraie
4 October	15:00	CA Chalonnes	3 – 2 a.e.t	AC Longue
4 October	15:00	Somloire Cerqueux	0 – 0; 3 - 1 pen.	ESOF La Roche-sur-Yon
4 October	15:00	OS Saint Nazaire	4 – 4; 2 - 4 pen.	Saint Pere de Retz
4 October	15:00	ES Segre	3 – 0	FC Reze
4 October	15:00	ES Grosbreuil	5 – 3	OS Saint Melaine
4 October	15:00	Belleville-sur-Vie	0 – 0; 3 - 4 pen.	RC Ancenis 44

Auvergne
Date	Kick Off	Home	Result	Away
3 October	15:00	Vezezoux	0 – 8	Aurillac FCA
3 October	16:30	AS Sansac	0 – 1	Le Puy Foot 43 Auverge
3 October	18:00	AS Varennes	0 – 6	AS Domerat
3 October	18:00	AS Yzeure	11 – 0	Billy-Crechy
3 October	20:00	Chappes FF	2 – 1	US Saint Georges
3 October	20:00	AS Ferrieres	1 – 3	USP Commentary
3 October	20:00	AA Lapalisse	1 – 3	SA Thiers
4 October	15:00	Lignerolles Lavault	0 – 2 a.e.t	Perignat-Sarlieve
4 October	15:00	Clermont Saint Jacques	4 – 0	Esperance Ceyrat
4 October	15:00	Clermont Ouvoimoja	1 – 3	Moulins Yzeure Et.
4 October	15:00	CS Volvic	0 – 4	EDS Montluçon
4 October	15:00	Martres-de-Veyre	0 – 2	Saint Germain Fosses
4 October	15:00	Stade Saint Yorre	4 – 4; 5 - 4 pen.	FC Chamalières
4 October	15:00	Plauzat-Champeix	3 – 6	RC Vichy
4 October	15:00	Combelle Charb.	4 – 0	US Messeix
4 October	15:00	US Saint Flour	7 – 0	Entente Nord Lozère
4 October	15:00	AS Espinat	1 – 0	Ally Mauriac
4 October	15:00	US Marmanhac	0 – 3	FC Cournon-d'Auvergne
4 October	15:00	CO Craponne	2 – 3 a.e.t	US Murat

Basse-Normandie
Date	Kick Off	Home	Result	Away
3 October	16:00	US Saint Paraise	1 – 2 a.e.t	ES Pointe Hague
3 October	16:30	S. Saint Georges Domf.	1 – 10	US Avranches
3 October	18:00	FC du Pays Aiglon	0 – 2	FC Flers
3 October	18:30	ASPTT Argentan	1 – 1; 4 - 5 pen.	FC Agneaux
3 October	19:00	USON Mondeville	2 – 1	SU Dives
3 October	19:15	FC Saint-Lô Manche	4 – 1	CA Lisieux Pa
4 October	15:00	ASC Lexoviens	1 – 2	US Alençon 61
4 October	15:00	SC Herouvillais	4 – 2	OS Maladrerie
4 October	15:00	ES Airan Mery Corbon	0 – 3	US Granville
4 October	15:00	ES Coutances	1 – 4	AJS Ouistreham
4 October	15:00	US Saint Quentin-Homme	0 – 3	FC Bayeux
4 October	15:00	FC Argences	0 – 2	AF Virois
4 October	15:00	FC Agon Coutanville	3 – 1	AS Passais Saint Fraimb
4 October	15:00	US Thaon Fvm	6 – 0	FC Vimoutiers
4 October	15:00	FC Bretteville-Laize	2 – 1	Periers Sports
4 October	15:00	FC Equeurdr. Hainnev	2 – 3 a.e.t	AS Cherbourg Football

Bourgogne
Date	Kick Off	Home	Result	Away
3 October	17:30	US La Charite	0 – 1	Nevers Football
3 October	18:00	Branges	0 – 3	AS Quetigny
3 October	18:00	LR Chatenoy	0 – 1	FC Chalon
3 October	19:00	Beaune FC	1 – 3 a.e.t	FC Montceau Bourgogne
3 October	19:00	Stade Auxerre	0 – 1	SC Selongey
4 October	15:00	Etang-Arroux	2 – 1 a.e.t	US Meursault
4 October	15:00	JS Maconnaise	0 – 2	AS Sornay
4 October	15:00	FC Sens	4 – 1	Montbard Venarey
4 October	15:00	Marsannay	1 – 1; 5 - 4 pen.	Autun FC
4 October	15:00	Chevannes FC	1 – 0	CL Chenove
4 October	15:00	Saint Georges	6 – 0	Sens Francomaghreb
4 October	15:00	Dijon FCA	0 – 2	Snid
4 October	15:00	RC Nevers-Chaulluy	1 – 3	JO Le Creusot
4 October	15:00	US Bourbon	1 – 1; 3 - 4 pen.	USC Paray

Bretagne
Date	Kick Off	Home	Result	Away
3 October	15:30	AS Pluvignoise	0 – 4	Stade Pontivy
3 October	16:00	Baud FC	0 – 3	L'Elvinoise
3 October	16:30	CS Plelanais	0 – 0; 8 - 7 pen.	La Plancoetine
3 October	16:30	Baguer Pican	2 – 6	AS Vitré
3 October	18:00	Locmine Saint Col	0 – 4	GSI Pontivy
4 October	15:00	ACF Plouzane	2 – 1 a.e.t	Gouesnou FC
4 October	15:00	AS Plouvien	1 – 3	ESK Quimper
4 October	15:00	AS Plouhinec	0 – 1	US Concarneau
4 October	15:00	DC Carhaix	0 – 1	FC Stade Paimpol
4 October	15:00	Entente Saint Yves Ploudani	2 – 1	AS Santec
4 October	15:00	AS de Guilers	0 – 1	FC Landerneau
4 October	15:00	SC Morlaix	1 – 2	Quimper Cornouaille FC
4 October	15:00	FC Guiclan	5 – 2	ES Treffiagat
4 October	15:00	FC Pont L'Abbe	5 – 7	FC Lannion
4 October	15:00	AS Telgruc-sur-Mer	3 – 1	Sporting Brest Leg
4 October	15:00	AS Camaretoise	3 – 8	Landi FC
4 October	15:00	RC Lesnevien	3 – 8	AG Plouvorn
4 October	15:00	Plouezoch FC	1 – 1; 3 - 4 pen.	EA de Saint Renan
4 October	15:00	Gourin FC	1 – 0	Guipavas G. Ruen
4 October	15:00	Esperance Plouguerneau	4 – 2	Douarnenez
4 October	15:00	Guer Enfants	1 – 1; 4 - 3 pen.	Ploemuer 56 FC
4 October	15:00	Pluvigner Ker.	2 – 1	CS Quevenois
4 October	15:00	US Ploeren	1 – 2	CEP Lorient
4 October	15:00	FG Bannalec	1 – 3	FC Quiberon Saint Pierre
4 October	15:00	US Arradon	0 – 3	Languidic FC
4 October	15:00	Sene FC	–	Carnac FC
4 October	15:00	ARM Quimper Ergue	1 – 2	US Montagnarde
4 October	15:00	Esperance Sainte Helene	0 – 5	AS Monterblanc
4 October	15:00	ERG Paot. Dispount	2 – 1	FC Rosporden
4 October	15:00	Lorient Folclo	0 – 2	LESC Plobannalec
4 October	15:00	US Tregunc	4 – 2	AS Melgven
4 October	15:00	Briec Paotred	2 – 3	Coray Glazick
4 October	15:00	AS Graces	1 – 1; 3 - 4 pen.	CS Pledrannais
4 October	15:00	US Quessoy	2 – 1	AS Servel Lannion
4 October	15:00	La Saint Pierre Pleugri	0 – 3	Stade Lamballe
4 October	15:00	Saint Murois	0 – 2 a.e.t	Entente Trieux Pontrieux
4 October	15:00	Noyal Pontivy	1 – 5	US Saint Malo
4 October	15:00	AS Pledeliac	1 – 3 a.e.t	FC Dinan Lehon
4 October	15:00	Trelivan	2 – 0	Ginglin Cess.
4 October	15:00	US Plessala	1 – 1; 7 - 6 pen.	Stade Briochin
4 October	15:00	Saint Brieuc Cobsp	–	Combourg Jeunes
4 October	15:00	Plerin FC	2 – 3	AS Uzel Merleac
4 October	15:00	US Langueux	3 – 1	CS Begard
4 October	15:00	AS Binic	1 – 3	Ploermel FC
4 October	15:00	Ploubazlanec	0 – 1	SSO Ploufragan
4 October	15:00	Perros Louannec	0 – 0; 6 - 5 pen.	ASJC Saint Malo
4 October	15:00	Enfants de Saint Gildas	–	Esperance Chartres Bgne
4 October	15:00	AS Saint Jacques Foot	0 – 2	TA Rennes
4 October	15:00	GP Marzan	0 – 4	OC Cesson
4 October	15:00	Basse Vilaine FC	1 – 3	Guichen FC
4 October	15:00	ASC Romagne	0 – 1	US Montgermont
4 October	15:00	Bains-sur-Out Cad	1 – 2	AGL Fougeres
4 October	15:00	Saint Mel Chateaub.	0 – 2	Cpb-By Rennes
4 October	15:00	La Saint Hubert Lanouee	1 – 1; 2 - 4 pen.	US Pont Pean
4 October	15:00	AS La Meziere	1 – 3	Chantepie
4 October	15:00	FCAV Redon	0 – 3	La Vitréenne FC
4 October	15:00	Saint Jouan des Guer	0 – 2	Vignoc Hede Guer
4 October	15:00	US Saint Gregoire	2 – 0	US Saint Gilles
4 October	15:00	Rannee-le-Guerc	2 – 0	US Val D'Ize

Centre
Date	Kick Off	Home	Result	Away
3 October	19:00	Vierzon Foot 18	0 – 3	SO Romorantin
3 October	19:00	Saint Jean Braye Smoc	1 – 1; 4 - 5 pen.	FC Chartres
3 October	20:00	AS Gien	1 – 4	USE Avoine
4 October	15:00	Amicale Gallardon	0 – 2	US Orléans
4 October	15:00	FC Déolois	3 – 0	FC Drouais
4 October	15:00	USM Olivet	0 – 4	Saint-Pryve Saint-Hilaire FC
4 October	15:00	Joué-lès-Tours FCT	2 – 0	USM Saran
4 October	15:00	AS Salbris	1 – 2 a.e.t	J3S Amilly
4 October	15:00	SL Vierzon Chaillot	1 – 2 a.e.t	AC Amboise
4 October	15:00	US Le Pechereau	0 – 1	Vineuil SF
4 October	15:00	CA Ouzouer Le Marche	1 – 4	Saint-Avertin Sports
4 October	15:00	Amicale Sours	0 – 1	FC Saint-Jean-le-Blanc
4 October	15:00	ES Veretz Larcay	0 – 2	CCSP Tours
4 October	15:00	US Saint Cyr-en-Val	2 – 2; 6 - 5 pen.	OC Chateaudun
4 October	15:00	FC Azay Cheille	5 – 3	AS Bourges Portugais
4 October	15:00	FC Ouest Tourangeau	1 – 1; 3 - 2 pen.	US Montgivray

(Poitou-Charentes) Centre-Ouest
Date	Kick Off	Home	Result	Away
3 October	18:00	Chamois Niortais F.C.	6 – 2	Angoulême CFC
3 October	20:00	FC Rochefort	0 – 2	AFC Royan Vaux
3 October	20:00	CA Egletons	1 – 3	CF Lubersac Auvezere
3 October	20:00	FC Parthenay Viennay	0 – 3	La Ligugéenne Football
3 October	20:00	Cenon-sur-Vienne	0 – 2	ES Buxerolles
3 October	20:00	ES Saint Benoit	0 – 5	SO Châtellerault
3 October	20:00	Saint Maurice Gencay	4 – 0	Limoges La Bastide
3 October	20:00	Saint Savin Saint Germain	0 – 4	US Chauvigny
3 October	20:00	AS Aixe-sur-Vienne	0 – 3	CA Rilhac-Rancon
4 October	15:00	CA Angoulême Leroy	2 – 7	Thouars Foot 79
4 October	15:00	Matha Avenir	3 – 2 a.e.t	Esperance Terves
4 October	15:00	AS Tulle Portugais	0 – 7	Poitiers FC
4 October	15:00	AS Aiffres	0 – 4	UA Cognac
4 October	15:00	SA Mauze Rigne	0 – 2	Saint Jean D'Angely
4 October	15:00	Mauze-sur-Mignon	1 – 2 a.e.t	AFP Arvert
4 October	15:00	Châtellerault Portugais	5 – 0	AG Pierre Buffiere
4 October	15:00	FC Fleure	1 – 0	ESA Brive
4 October	15:00	Saint Georges Les Baill	0 – 1	FC Chauray
4 October	15:00	CS Feytiat	1 – 0	Limoges FC
4 October	15:00	SC Limoges Vigenal	2 – 0	CA Meymac

Champagne-Ardenne
Date	Kick Off	Home	Result	Away
3 October	18:00	RCC Épernay	3 – 1	Vaux-sur-Blaise
4 October	15:00	US Revin	1 – 4	Reims Sainte Anne
4 October	15:00	FC Chooz	5 – 1	Bignicourt-Saulx
4 October	15:00	Rethel Sportif	3 – 1	MJEP Cormontreuil
4 October	15:00	Reims Murigny Franco	2 – 4	Nord Champagne
4 October	15:00	AS Taissy	1 – 0 a.e.t	Sedan Torcy
4 October	15:00	US Bazeilles	1 – 2	OFC Charleville
4 October	15:00	CO Saint Dizier	2 – 1	SC Tinqueux
4 October	15:00	JSFC Saint Julien	2 – 2; 7 - 6 pen.	Etoile Chapelaine
4 October	15:00	Châlons Marocains	1 – 0	CO Langres
4 October	15:00	Andelot Rimaucourt	2 – 1 a.e.t	CS Ay
4 October	15:00	RCSC Chapelle	2 – 1	Eclaron Valcourt
4 October	15:00	SA Sezanne	2 – 1 a.e.t	Chaumont FC
4 October	15:00	SC Marnaval	7 – 3	Diane D'Eurville

Corsica
Date	Kick Off	Home	Result	Away
4 October	14:30	ÉF Bastia	5 – 2	US Ghisonaccia
4 October	14:30	JS Bonifacio	1 – 0	Porto Vecchio
4 October	14:30	CA Bastia	3 – 2	AS Furiani-Agliani
4 October	14:30	FC Borgo	3 – 0	Pieve di Lota
4 October	14:30	AJ Biguglia	3 – 3; 9 - 8 pen.	Bastelicaccia
4 October	14:30	CA Propriano	0 – 0; 2 - 1 pen.	Afa.
4 October	14:30	AS Casinca	0 – 2	FCA Calvi
4 October	14:30	Gazélec Ajaccio	5 – 0	FB Ile Rousse

Franche-Comté
Date	Kick Off	Home	Result	Away
3 October	15:00	Mezire	1 – 2	ASM Belfort
3 October	15:30	Bresse Jura Foot	2 – 1	Jura Lacs Foot
3 October	18:00	Champagnole	0 – 2	Jura Sud Foot
3 October	19:00	Besançon RC	2 – 0	CA Pontarlier
3 October	19:30	Grandvillars	1 – 3	Saint Vit
3 October	19:30	Baume L'Dames	4 – 0	Morteau Montlebon
3 October	19:30	L'Isle-sur-Doubs	1 – 3	AS Audincourt
3 October	19:30	PS Besançon	0 – 1	Lons Le Saunier
4 October	15:00	Pierrefontaine Lavir	2 – 4 a.e.t	Rougegoutte
4 October	15:00	Roche-Novillars	1 – 4	Sud Belfort
4 October	15:00	Larians-et-Munans	1 – 5	Vesoul Haute-Saône
4 October	15:00	Herimoncourt	1 – 5	AS Ornans
4 October	15:00	AC Besançon	1 – 4	Rochefort Amange
4 October	15:00	Val-de-Loue	1 – 2 a.e.t	Arbois
4 October	15:00	Poligny	1 – 2	Jura Dolois Football
4 October	15:00	'Luxeuil	7 – 0	AS Bavilliers

French Guiana
Date	Kick Off	Home	Result	Away

French Polynesia
Date	Kick Off	Home	Result	Away
13 June	20:00	AS Manu-Ura	2 – 0	Tahiti U-20

Guadeloupe
Kick Off	Home	Result	Away

Haute-Normandie
Date	Kick Off	Home	Result	Away
3 October	17:00	AC Saint Romain	1 – 3	Évreux FC
3 October	17:00	Plateau-Assoc	0 – 4	US Quevilly
4 October	15:00	CA Pont Audemer	2 – 1	ES Normanville
4 October	15:00	Saint Marcel Football	2 – 3	Haute Caucriauville
4 October	15:00	Illiers L'Eve	1 – 2	Saint Paul Romil.
4 October	15:00	JS Arnieres	2 – 4	FC Saint Aubin
4 October	15:00	Courbepine Plasnes	2 – 2; 2 - 4 pen.	Mont-Saint-Aignan
4 October	15:00	Montivilliers	5 – 0	Creil-sur-Mer
4 October	15:00	CMS Oissel	2 – 0	SC Pont Couronne
4 October	15:00	USF Fecamp	1 – 2	US Pont L'Arche
4 October	15:00	Basse-Saane	2 – 2; 4 - 2 pen.	RC Caudebec
4 October	15:00	GCO Bihorel	0 – 2	FC Dieppe
4 October	15:00	Houlme Bondev	0 – 2	US Luneray
4 October	15:00	Etoutteville	0 – 3	US Lillebonne

Île-de-France
Date	Kick Off	Home	Result	Away
3 October	19:00	US Torcy	1 – 0	SC Évry Ville
4 October	15:00	ES Montgeron	0 – 2	Noisy-le-Sec Banlieu
4 October	15:00	Nogent-sur-Marne FC	0 – 1	ASC Velizy
4 October	15:00	CS Mennecy	0 – 2	SFC Bailly Noisy
4 October	15:00	JS Suresnes	4 – 0	CO Ulis
4 October	15:00	CM Aubervilliers	3 – 2 a.e.t	Val Yerres Crosne
4 October	15:00	FC Porcheville	4 – 0	Saint Thibau FC
4 October	15:00	ASA Montereau	5 – 0	Vallee 78 FC
4 October	15:00	Sèvres FC 92	0 – 3	US Fleury Merogis
4 October	15:00	AC Boulogne Billencourt	2 – 0	AFC Igny
4 October	15:00	Sporting Montmagny	1 – 2	US Ivry
4 October	15:00	US Sénart-Moissy	10 – 0	AS Tigery
4 October	15:00	AJSC Nanterre	0 – 1	FC Versailles 78
4 October	15:00	US Roissy-en-France	1 – 3	FC Les Lilas
4 October	15:00	AS Meudon	0 – 3	AS Évry Essonne
4 October	15:00	Courbevoie Sports	4 – 2	Voisins FC
4 October	15:00	ES Viry-Châtillon	3 – 2	US Hardicourt
4 October	15:00	Olympique Adamois	5 – 2	Aubervilliers Juenes
4 October	15:00	Vilennes Orgeval	4 – 1	FC Courcouronnes
4 October	15:00	FC Plessis Robinson	4 – 1	Draveil FC
4 October	15:00	Ermont Taverny Cosmo	1 – 0	FC Chateau Landon
4 October	15:00	US Persan	1 – 0	UJA Alfortville
4 October	15:00	Claye Souilly Sports	3 – 0	Goussainville Portugais
4 October	15:00	AF Garenne Colombes	1 – 0	FC Cergy Pontoise
4 October	15:00	FAS Herblay	1 – 2	Villemomble Sports
4 October	15:00	Le Mee Foot	2 – 0	CO Vincennois
4 October	15:00	Entente 2m	0 – 2	VGA Saint Maur F. Masc.
4 October	15:00	Maccabi Paris	0 – 2	AS Ararat Issy
4 October	15:00	RC Fontainebleau	5 – 0	US Fontenay-sur-Bois
4 October	15:00	CA Paris	3 – 1	US Fontenay-sur-Bois
4 October	15:00	Racing Levallois 92	3 – 0	AS Orly
4 October	15:00	Neauphle-Pont.	2 – 1	FCM Garges Gonesse
4 October	15:00	Conflans FC	1 – 0	FC Gobelins
4 October	15:00	FC Morangis Chilly	2 – 1	CSL Aulnay
4 October	15:00	ES Colombienne Foot	3 – 0	US Alfortville
4 October	15:00	Rambouillet Yvelines	0 – 3	US Saint Denis
4 October	15:00	FC Mantois 78	2 – 0	AS Choisy-le-Roi
4 October	15:00	SFC Champagne 95	0 – 2	Noisiel FC
4 October	15:00	AS Saint Ouen L'Aumone	1 – 0	Tremblay FC
4 October	15:00	Neuilly Marne SFC	4 – 0	Olympique Viarmes Asnieres
4 October	15:00	FC Livry Gargan	1 – 0	FU Fosses
4 October	15:00	FC Bourget	2 – 1	Red Star Saint-Ouen
4 October	15:00	AAS Fresnes	1 – 3	L'Entente SSG
4 October	15:00	AS Poissy	3 – 0	CS Meaux Academy
4 October	15:00	Paris Universite Club	0 – 6	JA Drancy
4 October	15:00	ES Nangis	1 – 2	US Roissy-en-Brie
4 October	15:00	USM Gagny	2 – 5	FC Issy-les-Maulx
4 October	15:00	Corbeil Essonnes	0 – 2	ES Vitry
4 October	15:00	FCS Bretigny	0 – 1	Champigny FC 94
4 October	15:00	Saint Quentin Yvelines	1 – 1; 4 - 3 pen.	FC Villepinte

Languedoc-Roussillon
Date	Kick Off	Home	Result	Away
3 October	18:00	FC Sète	2 – 1	RCO Agde
3 October	18:30	Bagnols Pont	1 – 0	AS Fabregues
3 October	19:00	Perpignan Canet FC	1 – 1; 5 - 4 pen.	Mende Av. Foot Lozère
3 October	20:00	Thuir FC	2 – 4	FC Carcassonnais
4 October	14:30	OC Cabestany	1 – 2	Nord Lasallien
4 October	14:30	AEC Saint Gilles	6 – 3	Sète Le Social
4 October	14:30	FC Saint L'Abresel	4 – 0	AS Cendras
4 October	14:30	US Mauguio Carnon	1 – 4	LES Uzes Pont Du Gard
4 October	14:30	Valdonnez FC	0 – 5	Olympique Alès
4 October	14:30	FR Caux	4 – 2	Puissalicon Magalas
4 October	14:30	AS Salindras	0 – 2	JS Bernis
4 October	14:30	SO Lansargues	0 – 1	BECEFC Vallee
4 October	14:30	Portiragnes Vias E.	0 – 5	US Monoblet
4 October	14:30	CS Marseillan	0 – 1	AS Lattes
4 October	14:30	Entente Saint Clement Mont	0 – 7	La Gde Motte Pyramid

Lorraine
Date	Kick Off	Home	Result	Away
3 October	16:00	ES Villing	1 – 2	Jarville JF
3 October	16:00	US Holving	0 – 4	Forbach
3 October	17:00	Magny	3 – 6	US Raon-l'Étape
3 October	19:00	Sarreguemine 93	1 – 2	FC Sarrebourg
4 October	15:00	JS Thil	0 – 4	CSO Amnéville
4 October	15:00	Cosnes Vaux	1 – 5	JS Audun-le-Tiche
4 October	15:00	AS Stenay Mouzay	4 – 2	USB Longwy
4 October	15:00	FC Mondelange	–	FC Hayange
4 October	15:00	FC Hettange	1 – 3	Thionville FC
4 October	15:00	SC Guenange	0 – 5	FC Yutz
4 October	15:00	CS Veymerange	3 – 3; 4 - 3 pen.	ES Fameck
4 October	15:00	SR Creutzwald	0 – 3	FC Tremery
4 October	15:00	Ippling	0 – 7	Marienau Forbach
4 October	15:00	US Soucht	1 – 4 a.e.t	Delme-Solgne
4 October	15:00	Saint Avold Wenheck	2 – 1	ES Macheren
4 October	15:00	US Spicheren	1 – 2	US Nousseviller
4 October	15:00	CS Saulnes	1 – 3 a.e.t	CA Boulay
4 October	15:00	AS Villey Saint Etienne	0 – 1	AS Pagny-sur-Moselle
4 October	15:00	VHF Hannonville	1 – 2	US Ligny-en-Barrois
4 October	15:00	COS Villers	0 – 2	FC Bar-le-Luc
4 October	15:00	ESAP Metz	0 – 2	GS Neuves-Maisons
4 October	15:00	ES Metz	2 – 1	FC Hagondange
4 October	15:00	AS Lay Saint Christophe	2 – 1	AS Haute-du-Lievre
4 October	15:00	Sorcy Void	1 – 1; 2 - 4 pen.	CS Blenod
4 October	15:00	SAS Épinal	3 – 0	UST Lunéville
4 October	15:00	AS Gerardmer	2 – 3	ES Thaon
4 October	15:00	AS Vagney	–	AS Girancourt
4 October	15:00	Toul FC	2 – 1	AC Blainville Damel
4 October	15:00	Saulcy FC	0 – 3	ES Golbey
4 October	15:00	Sainte Omer La Bressaude	3 – 2 a.e.t	US Mirecourt
4 October	15:00	MJC Nancy Pichon	4 – 2	Saint Ame-Julienrupt
4 October	15:00	FC Pulnoy	4 – 2	FC Sainte Marguerite

(Pays de la Loire) Maine
Date	Kick Off	Home	Result	Away
3 October	16:00	CA Evron	1 – 1; 2 - 4 pen.	US Change
4 October	15:00	AS Laval Maghreb	0 – 3	Arnage-Pontlieue
4 October	15:00	AS Louvigne	1 – 2	La Suze FC
4 October	15:00	SA Mamers	0 – 9	ES Bonchamp
4 October	15:00	Saint Mars La Briere	1 – 1; 5 - 4 pen.	CS Change
4 October	15:00	SS Souge Le Ganelon	1 – 2	US Vibraye
4 October	15:00	FC Lassay	0 – 3	VS La Ferte
4 October	15:00	FC Stade Mayenne	3 – 2	Tennie Saint Symphorien
4 October	15:00	Le Mans Sablons	1 – 0	US Meral Cosse
4 October	15:00	AS La Milesse	3 – 0	US Saint Berthevin
4 October	15:00	USN Spay	1 – 0	Brulon Patriote
4 October	15:00	Contest-Saint Baud.	0 – 0; 3 - 5 pen.	FA Laval
4 October	15:00	Chateau-du-Loir	0 – 1	Louverne Sports
4 October	15:00	Le Mans Villaret	3 – 3; 4 - 2 pen.	Sablé FC
4 October	15:00	US Force	1 – 2	La Flèche RC
4 October	15:00	Chateau Gont. Anc.	0 – 0; 6 - 5 pen.	Ecommoy FC

Martinique
Date	Kick Off	Home	Result	Away

Mayotte
Date	Kick Off	Home	Result	Away
9 August	19:00	AS Neige	3 – 0	AJ Kani-Kéli

(Provence-Alpes-Côte d'Azur) Méditerranée
Date	Kick Off	Home	Result	Away
2 October	16:00	Avignon Foot 84	1 – 0	Gap FC
3 October	15:00	GS Consolat	2 – 1 a.e.t	UA La Valette
3 October	16:00	US Le Pontet	3 – 0	RC Grasse
3 October	18:00	FC Martigues	2 – 2; 5 - 4 pen.	ROS Menton
4 October	14:30	Saint Zacharie	0 – 3	Sporting Toulon
4 October	14:30	Cannet Roche	2 – 0	ES Fosseenne
4 October	14:30	Euga Ardziv	2 – 1	AS Gardanne
4 October	14:30	AS Gignacaise	2 – 3 a.e.t	T. Le Las
4 October	14:30	Istres Rassuen FC	2 – 0	CFC Avignon
4 October	14:30	Trinite Sports FC	2 – 3	US Marignane
4 October	14:30	FC de Mougins Cote	1 – 3	JS Saint Jean Beaulieu
4 October	17:00	ARS Belsunce	1 – 0	AS Gemenosienne

Midi-Pyrénées
Date	Kick Off	Home	Result	Away
3 October	18:00	Portet Carrefou	0 – 3	Toulouse Fontaines Club
3 October	18:00	CA Compound Capden	0 – 5	US Albi
3 October	18:00	Blagnac FC	2 – 1 a.e.t	Toulouse Saint James
3 October	18:30	Tarbes PF	1 – 0	Muret
3 October	20:00	UA Vic Fezensac	3 – 0	US Lavernose
3 October	20:00	Saint-Gaudens	1 – 0	ES Haute Adour
3 October	20:00	FC Lourdes	3 – 2	Golfech-Saint Paul
3 October	20:00	JS Carbonne	1 – 0	ES Gimont
3 October	20:00	Toulouse Bagatelle	2 – 1	Saint Orens FC
3 October	20:00	FC Pamiers	2 – 0	US Pibrac
3 October	20:00	Olympique Girou FC	1 – 0	Montauban
3 October	20:00	JSP Mazamet	1 – 0	SVD Pradines
3 October	20:30	AC Rodez Aveyron	1 – 3	USP Rignac
4 October	15:00	AS Izards	0 – 4	Balma SC
4 October	15:00	Lavelanet Mire FC	1 – 1; 5 - 3 pen.	US Castanet
4 October	15:00	Saint Alban Omnisports	0 – 0; 4 - 3 pen.	US Colomiers
4 October	15:00	Olympique Cazes	2 – 1	FC Saix Semalens
4 October	15:00	Saint Geniez D'Olt	0 – 6	JS Cugnaux

New Caledonia
Date	Kick Off	Home	Result	Away
12 February	18:00	Tiga Sports	2 – 10	AS Mont-Dore
12 February	18:00	ES Wetr	0 – 5	Gaïtcha
12 February	18:00	AS Magenta	3 – 1	AS Lössi
12 February	18:00	AS Kunié	3 – 1	JS Maré
12 February	18:00	Mouli Sport	3 – 1	AS Poum
12 February	18:00	AS Témala Ouélisse	2 – 7	Qanono Sports
7 March	20:00	AS Goa	2 – 7	Hienghène Sport
7 March	20:00	JS Baco	2 – 4	Thio Sport
4 April	20:00	Thio Sport	3 – 1	AS Kunié
4 April	20:00	Mouli Sport	2 – 0	Qanono Sports
4 April	20:00	AS Mont-Dore	4 – 0	Gaïtcha
4 April	20:00	Hienghène Sport	0 – 3	AS Magenta

Nord-Pas de Calais
Kick Off	Home	Result	Away

Picardie
Date	Kick Off	Home	Result	Away
3 October	16:00	ICS Crecois	3 – 1	ES Duvy
3 October	17:00	Noyers Saint Martin	0 – 2	SC Abbeville
3 October	18:00	FC Soissons	0 – 4	AFC Compiègne
3 October	19:00	AFC Creil	8 – 2	US Balagny
3 October	20:00	USM Senlis	4 – 1	Amiens AC
4 October	15:00	US Gignicourt	0 – 3	Olympique Saint Quentin
4 October	15:00	AS Thourotte	0 – 1 a.e.t	FC Holnon
4 October	15:00	US Gouvieux	2 – 1	Amiens Pigeonnier
4 October	15:00	Longueil Ann.	0 – 2	US Roye
4 October	15:00	ES Sainte Emilie	0 – 7	CS Villeneuve
4 October	15:00	CAFC Peronne	5 – 1	SC Noyon
4 October	15:00	AS Fresnoy	4 – 0	AS Lacroix Saint Ouen
4 October	15:00	US Breteuil	0 – 2 a.e.t	FC Chambly
4 October	15:00	AC Le Nouvion	0 – 4	FC Chateau Th.
4 October	15:00	US Lamorlaye	1 – 2	US Buire Hirson
4 October	15:00	AS Querrieu	4 – 0	ASP Neslois
4 October	15:00	ASA Presles	0 – 5	Sporting Albert
4 October	15:00	US Friville	3 – 0	US Etouy
4 October	15:00	AS Saint Remy	0 – 3	US Mouy
4 October	15:00	Marseille-en-Bvsis	0 – 3	US Camon
4 October	15:00	SC Conty-Loeuilly	3 – 1	Saint Vast 3vB
4 October	15:00	FC Saint Valery	2 – 1	Amiens Montieres
4 October	15:00	US Crèvecœur	0 – 3	Saint Just E. Chaussee
4 October	15:00	US Le Boisle	3 – 5	US Chevrieres
4 October	15:00	AC Hermes Berth.	3 – 1	RC Douliens
4 October	15:00	US Chantilly	2 – 0	US Nogent 60

Réunion
Date	Kick Off	Home	Result	Away
			–	

Rhône-Alpes
Date	Kick Off	Home	Result	Away
3 October	16:00	Vallee Gresse	1 – 2	Montramb Le C
3 October	18:00	FC Bourgoin Jallieu	3 – 0	Annecy FC
3 October	18:00	SO Chambéry Foot	3 – 0	FC Échirolles
3 October	19:00	Savigneux Montbrison	0 – 1	US Feurs
3 October	20:00	Saint Julien Genest	1 – 0	FC Bourg-Péronnas
4 October	14:30	ASA Villeur	2 – 1	AS Villefontaine
4 October	14:30	Divonne	2 – 0 a.e.t	CO Saint Fons
4 October	14:30	Ain Sud Foot	4 – 1	Sporting Marignier
4 October	14:30	CS Lagnieu	2 – 1	AS Montreal
4 October	14:30	Amancy	1 – 2	AS Ugine
4 October	14:30	AS Feyzin Portugais	1 – 4	FCS Rumilly
4 October	14:30	Chambéry Foot 73	1 – 2	AS Saint-Priest
4 October	14:30	Vallee L'Arve	0 – 3	FC Vaulx-en-V
4 October	14:30	Challex	0 – 8	ES Vallieres
4 October	14:30	S. Amphion Publier	3 – 5 a.e.t	UO Albertville
4 October	14:30	Manival Saint Ismier	3 – 0	Saint Andre D'Huiriat
4 October	14:30	Corbas FC	1 – 0	ASF Andrézieux
4 October	14:30	C. Amion Saint Paul	5 – 5; 3 - 2 pen.	Charvieu Chav
4 October	14:30	FC Francheville	0 – 1	Ch. F. Algeriens
4 October	14:30	OF Saint Cyprien	0 – 4	CBE Feyzin
4 October	14:30	Fleurie Villi	0 – 6	AS Valence
4 October	14:30	FC Crolles Bernin	0 – 5	Domtac FC
4 October	14:30	ASJF Domene	0 – 6	Tournon Tain
4 October	14:30	Millery Vourles	4 – 1	OC Eybens
4 October	14:30	FC Val Lyonnais	0 – 1	Auben Sud Ard
4 October	14:30	Chateauneuf Rhone	2 – 4	Saint Marcel Val
4 October	14:30	US Reventin	1 – 0	SC Caluire
4 October	14:30	Fontaines 2	3 – 5	Marcy Charbon
4 October	14:30	Eyrieux Embro	0 – 5	MDA Chasselay
4 October	14:30	FC Cote Saint Andre	3 – 2	FC Cluses Scionzier
4 October	14:30	Bouge Chambéry	0 – 5	FC Valence
4 October	14:30	FC Bourg Oisans	0 – 5	FC Aix
4 October	14:30	FC de Luenaz	1 – 1; 4 - 1 pen.	US Gieres
4 October	14:30	Thyez	3 – 1	Magland
4 October	14:30	Veyle-Vaulx-Jonc	2 – 3 a.e.t	JSO Givors
4 October	14:30	FC Sud Isère	1 – 2	Olympique Rillieux
4 October	14:30	UOD Tassin	0 – 4	AS Lyon Duchère
4 October	14:30	Saint Martin H. Portugal	4 – 0	FC 2A Grenoble
4 October	14:30	F. Sud Gessien	1 – 2	US Murette
4 October	14:30	AL Saint Maurice Exil	3 – 3; 3 - 4 pen.	AC Seyssinet
4 October	14:30	L'Etrat La Tour	0 – 1	ASM Vénissieux
4 October	14:30	AS Saint Symphorien Pomey	1 – 4	Miserieux Trevoux
4 October	14:30	AS du Pic	1 – 4	Bord-de-Saône
4 October	14:30	Roa. Clermont	0 – 8	FC Villefranche Beaujolais
4 October	14:30	La Verpillier	2 – 1	Saint Romain-Puy
4 October	14:30	US Chamboeuf	0 – 2	FC Loire Nord
4 October	14:30	FC Dunieres	0 – 1	UGA Decines
4 October	14:30	ESB Marboz	–	Neuville-Saône
4 October	14:30	AS Se. Riviere	0 – 3	AS Chavanay
4 October	14:30	Saint Paul-Jarez	1 – 0	Rhone Val-La Voulte
4 October	14:30	Odenas-Charen	2 – 4	FC Annonay
4 October	14:30	Mount Pilat Foot	4 – 1	AS Saint Donat
4 October	14:30	ESVS Thoissey	1 – 2	FCO Firminy
4 October	14:30	US Bonson	0 – 3	Valdaine FC

== See also ==
- 2009–10 Coupe de France
- 2009–10 Coupe de France preliminary round
- 2009–10 Coupe de France 1st round
- 2009–10 Coupe de France 5th through 6th rounds
- 2009–10 Ligue 1
- 2009–10 Ligue 2
- 2009–10 Championnat National
- 2009–10 Championnat de France Amateur
- 2009–10 Championnat de France Amateur 2
