= 2009–10 Coupe de France preliminary round =

The 2009–10 Coupe de France is the 93rd season of the French most prestigious cup competition, organized by the French Football Federation, and is open to all clubs in French football, as well as clubs from the overseas departments and territories (Guadeloupe, French Guiana, Martinique, Mayotte, New Caledonia, French Polynesia, and Réunion). All of the teams that enter the competition, but were not members of Ligue 1 or Ligue 2, have to compete in the regional qualifying rounds. The regional qualifying rounds determine the number of regional clubs that will earn spots in the 7th round and normally lasts six rounds.

See 2009–10 Coupe de France for details of the rounds from the 7th round onwards.

== Calendar ==
On 23 June 2009, the French Football Federation announced the calendar for the Coupe de France.

Round	First match date	Fixtures	Clubs	Notes
Preliminary round	16 August 2009			

== Preliminary round ==
Aquitaine
Date	Kick off	Home	Result	Away
22 August	16:00	ES Nay Vath Vielha	0 – 1	AS Mourenx Bourg
22 August	20:00	SA Medoc Lesparre	1 – 7	FC Medoc Atlantique
23 August	15:30	US JSA-CPA	2 – 3	AS Saint Aubin-de-Medoc
23 August	15:30	ES Bruges	3 – 2	Saint Medard APB
23 August	15:30	ES Eysines	2 – 1 a.e.t	CA Parempuyre
23 August	15:30	FC Bouliacaise	6 – 3	AC Bordeaux
23 August	15:30	CA Carignan	0 – 3	ASC Mayotte
23 August	15:30	ASM Clermont Auvergne	5 – 2	FC Ambes
23 August	15:30	US Gradignan	4 – 2	FC Pierroton Cestas
23 August	15:30	FC du Pays Lindois	0 – 3	FC Belves
23 August	15:30	AL Douville	1 – 6	US Creysse Lembras
23 August	15:30	FLR Le Monteil	1 – 2	ES Boulazac
23 August	15:30	JS Corgnac	2 – 1	FC Terrasson
23 August	15:30	FC Vergt	2 – 1 a.e.t	La Agonac Patriote
23 August	15:30	FC Limens	2 – 1	FC Faux
23 August	15:30	AS Limeyrat	2 – 1	US Chancelade
23 August	15:30	CMS Hautmedoc	3 – 0	Stade Pauillac
23 August	15:30	CA Sainte Helene	1 – 1; 5 - 3 pen.	US Ludonaise
23 August	15:30	US le Temple et le Porge	0 – 2	FC La Teste
23 August	15:30	US Saucats	0 – 3	SC Ares
23 August	15:30	SC Cabanac	4 – 2 a.e.t	FC Castres Portets
23 August	15:30	Saint Macaire	3 – 2 a.e.t	US Quinsac
23 August	15:30	AS Villandraut Prechac	2 – 0	FC Barsac Preignac
23 August	15:30	US Aillas Auros	6 – 2	AS Morizes
23 August	15:30	US Saint Pierre De Mons	2 – 5	La Savignac de Joyeuse
23 August	15:30	US Capbreton	2 – 2; 2 - 3 pen.	ES Montoise
23 August	15:30	AM Taller	2 – 1	US Saint Maurice Grenade
23 August	15:30	US Laluquoise	0 – 2	FC Vielle
23 August	15:30	LM Saint Geours	3 – 5	CA Morcenx
23 August	15:30	FC Chalosse	0 – 3	PST Tartas
23 August	15:30	AS Monbahus	3 – 2	SC Aiguillon
23 August	15:30	SC Astaffort	2 – 1	FC Fumel Libos
23 August	15:30	SCDO Daussois	0 – 1	F. Casseneuil Av.
23 August	15:30	SU Gontaud	1 – 0	US Villereal
23 August	15:30	FC Vallee de Ousse	2 – 1	US Castetis Gouze
23 August	15:30	FC Gan	1 – 0	FC Lescar
23 August	15:30	FC Pau Espagnol	1 – 2	Bayonne Portugais
23 August	15:30	Les Hendaye de Eglantins	6 – 1	US Artiguelouve Aubertin
23 August	15:30	ES Meillon Assat Narc	1 – 0	ES Pyreneene
23 August	15:30	Sporting Hiriburuko Ainhara	0 – 0; 2 – 4 pen.	FC Hasparren
23 August	15:30	JC Saint Seurin	3 – 0	Olympique Cessac
23 August	15:30	ES Flaujagues	0 – 5	AS Les Peintures
23 August	15:30	FC Cubzac	1 – 6	FC Vallee Gamage
23 August	15:30	ES Vayres	3 – 0	La Ville de Sulpice de Faleyrens
23 August	15:30	US Guitres	3 – 2 a.e.t	US Saint Yzan Laruscade

Auvergne
Date	Kick off	Home	Result	Away
23 August	15:00	Ballon Beaulon	4 – 1	US Lusigny
23 August	15:00	AS Villeneuve	1 – 4	US Chevagnes
23 August	15:00	US Jeunes De Mayotte	3 – 1	AS Dompierre
23 August	15:00	AS Neuilly Le Real	2 – 3	CS Thiel-Acolin
23 August	15:00	AS Terjat	1 – 3	US Doyet
23 August	15:00	AS Premilhat	1 – 0	AS Marcillat
23 August	15:00	US Hyds	1 – 6	AS Villebretoise
23 August	15:00	AS Bellenaves	2 – 4	Charmes 2000
23 August	15:00	FC Montluçon Chatel-Guyon	1 – 0	US Vallon
23 August	15:00	FC Bezenet	2 – 1	FC Couleuvre
23 August	15:00	CS Villefranche	2 – 0	AL Chamblet
23 August	15:00	US Saint Desire	0 – 3	US Saint Victor
23 August	15:00	US Malicorne	0 – 1	US Desertines
23 August	15:00	FC Mayotte de Vichy	6 – 3	US Trezelles
23 August	15:00	AS Billezois	5 – 2	Le Nord Creuzier
23 August	15:00	RS Magnet	1 – 4	AS Rongeres
23 August	15:00	CA Saulcet	0 – 6	US Ebreuil
23 August	15:00	CS Paray-Loriges	6 – 4	AS Saint Prix
23 August	15:00	FC La Chapelle Molles	2 – 1	AS Le Breuil
23 August	15:00	AS Aurillac	0 – 10	US Aspre Maronne
23 August	15:00	BR Albepierre	3 – 2	FC Coltines
23 August	15:00	AS Tanavelle	2 – 3	AS Saint-Poncy
23 August	15:00	US Saint Illide	0 – 1	L'Entente Anglards-Salers
23 August	15:00	JS Apchon	0 – 5	FC Moussages
23 August	15:00	ES Vitrac Marcoles	2 – 1	USR Laroquebrou
23 August	15:00	ES Allanche	1 – 5	Minier FC
23 August	15:00	AS Naucelles	0 – 2	AS Belbex
23 August	15:00	AS Talizat	6 – 0	Sporting Ydes
23 August	15:00	US Carbonat	6 – 3	Mourjou-Cassa
23 August	15:00	FC Saignes	1 – 2	US Crandelles
23 August	15:00	AS Laussonne	1 – 0	Loudes FC
23 August	15:00	FC Espaly	4 – 1	CO Coubon
23 August	15:00	AS Le Brignon	0 – 4	La Bastide-Puylauren
23 August	15:00	ES Cerzat	0 – 3	US Le Puy Portugais
23 August	15:00	FC Olby-Mazayes	3 – 2	FC Briffons-Perpezat
23 August	15:00	AS Pontgibaud la Goutelle	2 – 1	SC Gelles
23 August	15:00	NOA Paslieres	3 – 2	ES Saint Remy-sur-Durolle
23 August	15:00	AS Artonne	0 – 4	AS Joze
23 August	15:00	US Menetrol	2 – 2; 4 - 3 pen.	CS Vertolaye
23 August	15:00	AS Montel Villosanges	2 – 4	US Menat
23 August	15:00	Sancy Artense Foot	1 – 12	FC Plauzat-Champeix
23 August	15:00	US Pontaumur	0 – 5	FC Charbonnieres les Vieilles
23 August	15:00	FC Bromont Lamot	0 – 2	Racing Clermont France
23 August	15:00	US Lapeyrouse	0 – 1	FC Pionsat Saint Hilaire
23 August	15:00	US Palladuc	1 – 3	US de Celles-sur-Durolle
23 August	15:00	ES Couze-Pavin	1 – 4	AJ de la Gauthiere
23 August	15:00	FC Franco-Turc la Monnerie	0 – 3	FC Aubiere
23 August	15:00	AS Chateaugay	2 – 3	Athletic Clermont Ouvoimoja
23 August	15:00	ES Saint Sauves-Tauves	2 – 3	FC Sayat-Argnat
23 August	15:00	Charb-Paugnat Puy Guill	5 – 1	ASAC Royat
23 August	15:00	FC Sud Livradois	1 – 4	FC Mezel
23 August	15:00	UST Huriel	3 – 2	MC Montluçon

(Poitou-Charentes) Centre-Ouest
Date	Kick off	Home	Result	Away
22 August	20:00	Angoulême Bassau	2 – 1	Saint Genis Saintonge
22 August	20:00	UF Barbezieux-Barret	2 – 3	Chadenac Marignac
22 August	20:00	Nanteuil Verteuil	0 – 3	US Pressac
22 August	20:00	Roumazieres Loubert	3 – 1	AS Conceze
22 August	20:00	USA Verdille	1 – 7	US Civray
22 August	20:00	ES Ecoyeux-Venerand	5 – 1 a.e.t	FC Aubeterre
22 August	20:00	OS Les Mathes	0 – 9	FC Saint Brice-sur-Vienne
22 August	20:00	FC Mirambeau Canton	5 – 0	US Chateauneuf 16
22 August	20:00	Pont L Abbe D Arnoul	4 – 2	AS Merpins
22 August	20:00	CA Egletons	2 – 2; 4 - 2 pen.	SC Verneuil-sur-Vienne
22 August	20:00	ES Ardin	0 – 2	ES Poitiers 3 Cites
22 August	20:00	ES Gatinaise	1 – 0	AS Valdivienne
22 August	20:00	SL Antran	5 – 3 a.e.t	FC Thenezay Ferriere
22 August	20:00	Sud 86 Region Couhe	2 – 0	USA Montbron
22 August	20:00	AS Ingrandes	2 – 0	Buslaurs Thireuil
22 August	20:00	FC Rouille	4 – 3 a.e.t	FC Vrines
23 August	15:00	AS Aigre	0 – 3	CS Islois
23 August	15:00	FC Ansac-Vienne	2 – 3	US Saint Vaury
23 August	15:00	US Baignes	3 – 2	CS Trizay
23 August	15:00	SSF Chabanais	1 – 0	AS Saint Viance
23 August	15:00	L'Entente Foot 96	3 – 0	FC Saint Porchaire
23 August	15:00	FC Lignières	2 – 0	ES Bourcefranc
23 August	15:00	ES Linars	4 – 2	FC Montendre
23 August	15:00	FC Breuil Magne	2 – 0	ES Mougon
23 August	15:00	US Cercoux	6 – 4 a.e.t	Javrezac Jarnouzeau
23 August	15:00	FC Esab 96	2 – 0	ES Fleac
23 August	15:00	La Rochelle Opmvs	9 – 0	OSC Fors
23 August	15:00	FC La Rochelle	5 – 6	Val De Boutonne Foot
23 August	15:00	US Puilboreau	0 – 4	Stade Vouille 79
23 August	15:00	US Rochefort	3 – 1 a.e.t	ASPTT Niort
23 August	15:00	ES Thenac	1 – 2	CO La Couronne
23 August	15:00	Jugeals Noailles	3 – 1	US Beaune Les Mines
23 August	15:00	AL Montaignac	2 – 2; 3 - 4 pen.	Champagnac Riviere
23 August	15:00	AS Tulle Portugais	2 – 1	US Vayres
23 August	15:00	Vignols Voutezac	3 – 5 a.e.t	US Exideuil
23 August	15:00	CLNC Bressuire	1 – 2	Mignaloux Beauvoir
23 August	15:00	US Brion 79	2 – 3	US Scorbe Clairvaux
23 August	15:00	AR Cherveux	2 – 1	ES Oyre
23 August	15:00	AS Ensigne	3 – 0	Stade Marans
23 August	15:00	ES Fayenoirterre	1 – 2	CS Dissay
23 August	15:00	FC Val-De-Sevre	5 – 2 a.e.t	Saint Jean-De-Liversay
23 August	15:00	US La Creche	1 – 2	FC Saint Rogatien
23 August	15:00	FC Lutaizien	1 – 2	Leigne-sur-Usseau
23 August	15:00	CA Saint Aubin Le Cloud	7 – 0	US Cisse
23 August	15:00	FC Saint Jean Misse	2 – 1	CO Saint Genest 86
23 August	15:00	Saint Martin Les Melle	5 – 2	ES Surgeres
23 August	15:00	Saint Pierre Echaubrogn	4 – 0	Vouneuil Biard
23 August	15:00	Saint Romans Les Melle	3 – 1	FC Fouras Saint Laurent
23 August	15:00	FC Saint Eanne	1 – 5	US Vivonne
23 August	15:00	AS Saint Ouenne	0 – 1	FC Loudon
23 August	15:00	Voulmentin Saint Aubin	5 – 2	AS Sèvres-Anxaumont
23 August	15:00	Vrere St Leger De M	6 – 2	US Vicq-sur-Gartempe
23 August	15:00	Availles En Chatellon	2 – 1	Souvigne Saint Martin
23 August	15:00	Charroux Mauprevoir	3 – 0	USF Pamproux
23 August	15:00	ES Chateau Larcher	6 – 3	SC Absie Largeasse
23 August	15:00	Fontaine Le Comte	2 – 0	Mauleon Trinitaires
23 August	15:00	AS Genouille	4 – 1	US Rivieres
23 August	15:00	US Jaunay Clan	4 – 0	ES Saint Maixent
23 August	15:00	ES Lhommaize	1 – 3	FC Chiche
23 August	15:00	US Nord Vienne	0 – 1	ES Aubinrorthais
23 August	15:00	FC Smarves 1936	2 – 1	AS Clesse
23 August	15:00	Saint Georges Les Baill	1 – 0	Villiers En Plaine
23 August	15:00	AS Nexon	0 – 0; 4 - 3 pen.	Nouziers La Cellette
23 August	15:00	FCC Oradour-sur-Vayres	5 – 0	US Le Lonzac 96
23 August	15:00	Saint Laurent Eglises	3 – 1	US Valliere
23 August	15:00	US Veyrac	1 – 5 a.e.t	ES Ussel

Champagne-Ardenne
Date	Kick off	Home	Result	Away
23 August	15:00	PTT Charleville	1 – 3	ES Charleville
23 August	15:00	FC Fepin	3 – 8	CA Montherme
23 August	15:00	École Sedan	0 – 3	US Flize
23 August	15:00	US Deville	4 – 2	ES Joigny
23 August	15:00	US La Francheville	1 – 2	Nouzonville FC
23 August	15:00	US Machault	7 – 3	Sporting Warmeriville
23 August	15:00	FC Vallant Fontaine	5 – 1	Foot 2000
23 August	15:00	US Crancey	2 – 0	US Plancy
23 August	15:00	Vaudes Animation	1 – 0	Alliance Sud Ouest
23 August	15:00	ES Bar-Bayel	4 – 3	AS Droupt Saint Basle
23 August	15:00	Juvigny OF	2 – 0	AS Mairy sur Marne
23 August	15:00	AS Berru Lavannes	3 – 0	Franco-Turk de Reims
23 August	15:00	L'Entente Somsois Margerie	2 – 2; 4 - 5 pen.	Bignicourt sur Saulx FC
23 August	15:00	FC Rilly La Montagne	4 – 2	Remoise Esperance
23 August	15:00	Reims PACA	3 – 1	Bouvancourt Hermonvi
23 August	15:00	US Oiry	1 – 2	US Dizy
23 August	15:00	ES Breuvannes	0 – 8	US Ageville
23 August	15:00	Inter FAC	3 – 2	AS Esnouveaux
23 August	15:00	Prez SS Lafauche	2 – 0	Poissons Noncourt
23 August	15:00	AS Hallignicourt	3 – 0	Saint Dizier Esperance

Guadeloupe
Date	Kick off	Home	Result	Away
12 August	15:00	J. Vieux Fort FC	5 – 0	A.S.M
12 August	15:00	ASC Madiana	3 – 1	Club Sport
12 August	15:00	U.S.C.B	6 – 0	AC Saint Robert
16 August	20:00	S.L.A.C	3 – 0	Saint Claude FC
16 August	20:00	Alliance FC	3 – 0	J.S.A
16 August	20:00	Real Club	4 – 1	Mondial Club
16 August	20:00	A.O.G	–	J.T.R

Languedoc-Roussillon
Date	Kick off	Home	Result	Away
23 August	15:00	Bize Minervois FC	3 – 5	FC de la Malepere
23 August	15:00	UF Lezignanais	2 – 3	Narbonne Septimanie
23 August	15:00	Villegly	0 – 4	OS Saint Papoul
23 August	15:00	ES Malvoise	3 – 0	FC 3F
23 August	15:00	US Conques	1 – 5	FU Narbonne
23 August	15:00	Amelie Les Bains FC	2 – 7	Baho Pezilla
23 August	15:00	FC Claira	A – A	Saint James le Boulou Maur.
23 August	15:00	Latour-bur-Elne	6 – 3	AO Moulin Perpignan
23 August	15:00	Bedarieux Orb Gravez	2 – 0	Béziers Ouest Foot
23 August	15:00	Quarant-Cruzy	2 – 6	AS Béziers Jeunes
23 August	15:00	Loiras du Bosc	0 – 2	Le Caylar Larzac
23 August	15:00	Olympique Saint Drezery	1 – 0	US Lunel
23 August	15:00	AS Valergues	8 – 1	Marsillargues
23 August	15:00	AS Beauvoisin	0 – 8	US Calvisson
23 August	15:00	Ribaute Taver	3 – 3; 3 - 2 pen.	AS Nîmes Mahorais
23 August	15:00	US Saint Ambroix	4 – 0	US Ribaute
23 August	15:00	Olympique Saint Alex FC	3 – 0	RC Sauveterre
23 August	15:00	ES Tavel	5 – 0	Saint Jean Gard
23 August	15:00	FC Vers	4 – 5	Nord Courbessac

Martinique
Date	Kick off	Home	Result	Away
29 August	15:00	ASC Mon Pito	0 – 3	Sainte Anne Santana Club
29 August	15:00	Eveil	1 – 0	Etincelle
29 August	15:00	Sainte-Luce Espoir	3 – 4	Silver Star
29 August	15:00	U. des Jeunes de Red	3 – 0	Sainte Anne Cap 110
29 August	15:00	L Intrepide C. Fort	0 – 3	Stade Spiritain
29 August	15:00	US Boe	3 – 1	A.S.C.E.F.
29 August	15:00	New Star Ducos	3 – 0	ASJ Bo Kanal
29 August	15:00	Olympique du Marin	3 – 0	FC Schœlcher
29 August	15:00	Real Tartane	3 – 0	Solidarite
29 August	15:00	JS Marigot	0 – 1	Etendard
29 August	15:00	CSC Carbet	1 – 1; 3 - 5 pen.	CO Tranelle
30 August	15:00	US Marinoise	5 – 0	ASC Hirondelle
2 September	15:00	Effort	0 – 3	Oceanic Club

(Provence-Alpes-Côte d'Azur) Méditerranée
Date	Kick off	Home	Result	Away
22 August	17:00	Olympique de Barbentane	3 – 1	La Seyne FC
23 August	15:00	CA Digne 04	1 – 2	AS Gignacaise
23 August	15:00	Saint Zacharie	2 – 1	A.S. Fontaines Antibes
23 August	15:00	ES Cros-de-Cagnes	0 – 1 a.e.t	US Saint-Martin-de-Crau
23 August	15:00	CS Sarrains	2 – 3	JS Des Pennes Mira

== See also ==
- 2009–10 Coupe de France
- 2009–10 Coupe de France 1st round
- 2009–10 Coupe de France 3rd through 4th rounds
- 2009–10 Coupe de France 5th through 6th rounds
- 2009–10 Ligue 1
- 2009–10 Ligue 2
- 2009–10 Championnat National
- 2009–10 Championnat de France Amateur
- 2009–10 Championnat de France Amateur 2
