= 2009–10 Coupe de France 5th through 6th rounds =

The 2009–10 Coupe de France is the 93rd season of the French most prestigious cup competition, organized by the French Football Federation, and is open to all clubs in French football, as well as clubs from the overseas departments and territories (Guadeloupe, French Guiana, Martinique, Mayotte, New Caledonia, French Polynesia, and Réunion). All of the teams that enter the competition, but were not members of Ligue 1 or Ligue 2, have to compete in the regional qualifying rounds. The regional qualifying rounds determine the number of regional clubs that will earn spots in the 7th round and normally lasts six rounds.

See 2009–10 Coupe de France for details of the rounds from the 7th Round onwards.

== Calendar ==
On 23 June 2009, the French Football Federation announced the calendar for the Coupe de France.

| Round | First match date | Fixtures | Clubs | Notes |
|---|---|---|---|---|
| 5th Round | 18 October 2009 | | | Clubs participating in the Championnat National gain entry. |
| 6th Round | 1 November 2009 | 153 | 346 → 193 | |

== Fifth round ==
=== Alsace ===
| Date | Kick Off | Home | Result | Away |

=== Aquitaine ===
| Date | Kick Off | Home | Result | Away |
|---|---|---|---|---|
| 17 October | 15:30 | Boucau Elan | 0 – 4 | Trélissac FC |
| 17 October | 19:00 | Bayonne Cr. | 1 – 0 | SA Merignac |
| 17 October | 19:00 | J. Villenave | 3 – 0 | EJ Saint Medard |
| 17 October | 19:00 | Oloron FC | 0 – 4 | Aviron Bayonnais FC |
| 18 October | 15:30 | ES Canejan | 1 – 2 a.e.t | Pau FC |
| 18 October | 15:30 | AGJA Cauderan | 1 – 3 | E. Blanquefort |
| 18 October | 15:30 | US Labrede | 2 – 1 a.e.t | FC Libourne-Saint-Seurin |
| 18 October | 15:30 | Saint Sulpice Cameyrac | 2 – 4 | SU Agen Lot-et-Garonne |
| 18 October | 15:30 | AS Tarnos | 0 – 3 | Bergerac Football |
| 18 October | 15:30 | Saint Andre Cubzac | 1 – 2 | ES Ambaresienne |

=== Auvergne ===
| Date | Kick Off | Home | Result | Away |
|---|---|---|---|---|
| 17 October | 18:00 | Chappes FF | 0 – 3 | ÉDS Montluçon |
| 17 October | 18:00 | USP Commentary | 3 – 5 a.e.t | AS Moulins |
| 17 October | 18:00 | Aurillac FCA | 0 – 1 | FC Cournon-d'Auvergne |
| 17 October | 20:00 | SA Thiers | 4 – 0 | Clermont Saint Jacq |
| 17 October | 20:00 | Le Puy F. 43 Auvergne | 3 – 0 | US Saint Flour |
| 18 October | 15:00 | Perignat-Sarlieve | 0 – 1 | Entente Moulins Yzeure |
| 18 October | 15:00 | Saint Germain Fosses | 2 – 0 | AS Domerat |
| 18 October | 15:00 | US Murat | 4 – 3 | RC Vichy |
| 18 October | 15:00 | Stade Saint Yorre | 0 – 4 | AS Yzeure |
| 18 October | 15:00 | Combelle Charb. | 0 – 1 | AS Espinat |

=== Basse-Normandie ===
| Date | Kick Off | Home | Result | Away |
|---|---|---|---|---|
| 17 October | 16:00 | SC Herouvillais | 1 – 2 | US Avranches |
| 17 October | 18:00 | FC Saint-Lô Manche | 0 – 2 | USON Mondeville |
| 17 October | 18:00 | US Granville | 2 – 1 | AJS Ouistreham |
| 17 October | 20:00 | AF Virois | 1 – 1; 7 - 8 pen. | FC Bayeux |
| 17 October | 20:00 | AS Cherbourg Football | 1 – 0 | US Alençon 61 |
| 18 October | 15:00 | US Thaon FVM | 3 – 0 | ES Pointe Hague |
| 18 October | 15:00 | FC Agon Coutanville | 0 – 3 | FC Flers |
| 18 October | 15:00 | FC Agneaux | 2 – 1 | FC Bretteville-Laize |

=== Bourgogne ===
| Date | Kick Off | Home | Result | Away |
|---|---|---|---|---|
| 17 October | 18:30 | AS Sornay | 0 – 1 | FC Sens |
| 17 October | 20:00 | FC Gueugnon | 1 – 3 | FC Montceau Bourgogne |
| 17 October | 20:00 | JO Le Creusot | 2 – 3 | CS Louhans-Cuiseaux |
| 18 October | 15:00 | FC Chalon | 1 – 3 | AS Quetigny |
| 18 October | 15:00 | USC Paray | 1 – 3 a.e.t | Nevers Football |
| 18 October | 15:00 | Etang-Arroux | 1 – 0 | Chevannes FC |
| 18 October | 15:00 | Marsannay | 0 – 5 | SC Selongey |
| 18 October | 15:00 | Snid | 1 – 0 | Saint Georges |

=== Bretagne ===
| Date | Kick Off | Home | Result | Away |

=== Centre ===
| Date | Kick Off | Home | Result | Away |
|---|---|---|---|---|
| 17 October | 19:00 | AC Amboise | 0 – 2 | SO Romorantin |
| 17 October | 19:30 | FCT Joue les Tours | 0 – 4 | US Orléans |
| 18 October | 15:00 | SC Azay Cheille | 0 – 6 | FC Saint Jean Le Blanc |
| 18 October | 15:00 | FC Chartres | 2 – 0 | CCS Tours Portugais |
| 18 October | 15:00 | US Saint Cyr-en-Val | 1 – 11 | Saint-Pryvé Saint-Hilaire FC |
| 18 October | 15:00 | Saint Avertin Sports | 1 – 1; 1 - 4 pen. | Vineuil Sports |
| 18 October | 15:00 | FC Ouest Tourangeau | 1 – 1; 6 - 5 pen. | USE Avoine |
| 18 October | 15:00 | J3S Amilly | 0 – 2 | FC Deols |

=== Centre-Ouest ===
| Date | Kick Off | Home | Result | Away |
|---|---|---|---|---|
| 17 October | 18:30 | La Ligugéenne Football | 0 – 5 | Chamois Niortais F.C. |
| 17 October | 19:00 | Thouars Foot 79 | 0 – 0; 3 - 4 pen. | CS Feytiat |
| 17 October | 20:00 | Saint Jean D'Angely | 2 – 1 | Châtellerault Portugais |
| 17 October | 20:00 | US Chauvigny | 0 – 1 a.e.t | AFC Royan Vaux |
| 17 October | 20:00 | Saint Maurice Gencay | 0 – 3 | FC Chauray |
| 17 October | 20:00 | CA Rilhac Rancon | 2 – 3 | SO Châtellerault |
| 18 October | 15:00 | AFP Arvert | 2 – 3 | CF Lubersac Auvezere |
| 18 October | 15:00 | Matha Avenir | 1 – 2 a.e.t | Poitiers FC |
| 18 October | 15:00 | FC Fleure | 2 – 5 | UA Cognac |
| 18 October | 15:00 | SC Limoges Vigenal | 2 – 3 | ES Buxerolles |

=== Aquitaine ===
| Date | Kick Off | Home | Result | Away |
|---|---|---|---|---|
| 17 October | 19:00 | Stade Reims | 2 – 0 | Rethel Sportif |
| 18 October | 14:30 | Reims Sainte Anne | 1 – 0 | RCC Épernay |
| 18 October | 14:30 | AS Taissy | 6 – 3 | FC Chooz |
| 18 October | 14:30 | OFC Charleville | 4 – 1 | Nord Champagne |
| 18 October | 14:30 | RSCS Chapelle | 2 – 1 | Andelot Rimaucourt |
| 18 October | 14:30 | SC Marnaval | 1 – 3 | CO Saint-Dizier |
| 18 October | 14:30 | Châlons Marocains | 0 – 2 | JSFC Saint Julien |
| 18 October | 14:30 | SA Sezanne | 0 – 4 | Troyes AC |

=== Corsica ===
| Date | Kick Off | Home | Result | Away |
|---|---|---|---|---|
| 18 October | 14:30 | FCA Calvi | 3 – 0 | ÉF Bastia |
| 18 October | 14:30 | JS Bonifacio | 0 – 4 | FC Borgo |
| 18 October | 14:30 | AJ Biguglia | 1 – 3 | CA Bastia |
| 18 October | 14:30 | Gazélec Ajaccio | 5 – 0 | CA Propriano |

=== Franche-Comté ===
| Date | Kick Off | Home | Result | Away |
|---|---|---|---|---|
| 17 October | 15:00 | Jura Dolois Football | 3 – 0 | Arbois |
| 17 October | 15:00 | Jura Sub Foot | 2 – 1 | AS Ornans |
| 17 October | 15:00 | Vesoul Haute-Saône | 5 – 1 | Lons Le Saunier |
| 17 October | 15:00 | Luxeuil | 1 – 2 | Baume L'Dames |
| 18 October | 15:00 | Rougegoutte | 0 – 3 | ASM Belfort |
| 18 October | 15:00 | Saint-Vit | 1 – 3 | Bresse Jura Foot |
| 18 October | 15:00 | Sud Belfort | 1 – 2 | AS Audincourt |
| 18 October | 15:00 | Rochefort Amange | 0 – 5 | Besançon RC |

=== French Guiana ===
| Date | Kick Off | Home | Result | Away |

=== Guadeloupe ===
| Kick Off | Home | Result | Away |

=== Haute-Normandie ===
| Date | Kick Off | Home | Result | Away |
|---|---|---|---|---|
| 17 October | 18:00 | US Quevilly | 2 – 0 | FC Dieppe |
| 18 October | 15:00 | CMS Oissel | 1 – 1; 1 - 4 pen. | FC Rouen |
| 18 October | 15:00 | Vesoul Haute-Saône | 5 – 1 | Lons Le Saunier |
| 18 October | 15:00 | FC Saint Aubin Les El. | 1 – 3 | Évreux FC |
| 18 October | 15:00 | Haute Caucriauville | 0 – 1 | CA Pont Audemer |
| 18 October | 15:00 | US Lillebonne | 0 – 1 | US Pont L'Arche |
| 18 October | 15:00 | US Luneray | 3 – 1 | Montivilliers |
| 18 October | 15:00 | Baase-Saane | 1 – 1; 5 - 4 pen. | Mont Saint Aignan |

=== Île-de-France ===
| Date | Kick Off | Home | Result | Away |
|---|---|---|---|---|
| 18 October | 15:00 | FC Livry Gargan | 3 – 4 a.e.t | CM Aubervilliers |
| 18 October | 15:00 | ASC Velizy | 0 – 3 | ES Colombienne Foot |
| 18 October | 15:00 | US Torcy | 2 – 1 | FC Porcheville |
| 18 October | 15:00 | AS Evry | 0 – 0; 3 - 4 pen. | Paris FC |
| 18 October | 15:00 | CMS Oissel | 1 – 1; 1 - 4 pen. | FC Rouen |
| 18 October | 15:00 | FC Bourget | 1 – 2 a.e.t | Neuilly Marne SFC |
| 18 October | 15:00 | Noisiel FC | 3 – 3; 5 - 6 pen. | FC Versailles 78 |
| 18 October | 15:00 | US Roissy-en-Brie | 1 – 0 | Ermont Taverny Cosmo |
| 18 October | 15:00 | JS Suresnes | 1 – 2 | Racing Levallois 92 |
| 18 October | 15:00 | Bailly Noisy SFC | 0 – 2 | FC Mantes |
| 18 October | 15:00 | Neauphle-Pont. | 1 – 2 a.e.t | US Ivry |
| 18 October | 15:00 | ES Vitry | 1 – 3 | Villemomble Sports |
| 18 October | 15:00 | FC Morangis Chilly | 0 – 4 | US Créteil-Lusitanos |
| 18 October | 15:00 | Villennes Orgeval | 1 – 4 | US Fleury Merogis |
| 18 October | 15:00 | US Saint Denis | 0 – 2 | Le Mee Foot |
| 18 October | 15:00 | FC Plessis Robinson | 0 – 2 | AS Poissy |
| 18 October | 15:00 | RC Fontainebleau | 1 – 3 | Claye Souilly Sports |
| 18 October | 15:00 | CA Paris-Charenton | 1 – 1; 4 - 3 pen. | L'Entente SSG |
| 18 October | 15:00 | US Persan | 1 – 2 | Olympique Noisy-le-Sec |
| 18 October | 15:00 | VGA Saint Maur F. Masc. | 2 – 2; 5 - 6 pen. | FC Issy-les-Maulx |
| 18 October | 15:00 | AS Saint Ouen L'Aumone | 2 – 1 a.e.t | JA Drancy |
| 18 October | 15:00 | Saint Quentin Yvelines | 4 – 3 a.e.t | AF Garenne Colombes |
| 18 October | 15:00 | ASA Issy | 0 – 3 | US Sénart-Moissy |
| 18 October | 15:00 | Champigny FC 94 | 3 – 3; 3 - 2 pen. | ES Viry-Châtillon |
| 18 October | 15:00 | ASA Montereau | 6 – 0 | Athletic Club de Boulogne Billencourt |
| 18 October | 15:00 | Olympique Adamois | 1 – 3 | FC Les Lilas |

=== Languedoc-Roussillon ===
| Date | Kick Off | Home | Result | Away |
|---|---|---|---|---|
| 17 October | 17:00 | Olympique Alès | 1 – 0 | FC Carcassonnais |
| 17 October | 18:00 | AS Carcassonnais Marocain | 0 – 1 a.e.t | FC Sète |
| 17 October | 20:00 | BECEFC Vallee | 0 – 5 | Perpignan Canet FC |
| 18 October | 14:30 | ES Uzès Pont du Gard | 1 – 2 | AS Lattes |
| 18 October | 14:30 | La Gde Motte Pyramid | 4 – 0 | JS Bernis |
| 18 October | 14:30 | RC Saint L'Abresel | 2 – 1 | US Monoblet |
| 18 October | 14:30 | AEC Saint Gilles | 2 – 2; 3 - 5 pen. | Nord Lasallien |
| 18 October | 14:30 | FR Caux | 1 – 3 | Bagnols Pont |

=== Lorraine ===
| Kick Off | Home | Result | Away |

=== Maine ===
| Date | Kick Off | Home | Result | Away |
|---|---|---|---|---|
| 17 October | 18:30 | FC Stade Mayenne | 1 – 2 a.e.t | La Suze FC |
| 18 October | 15:00 | USN Spay | 1 – 3 | Arnage-Pontlieue |
| 18 October | 15:00 | Louverné Sports | 0 – 2 | VS La Ferte |
| 18 October | 15:00 | Le Mans Sablons | 1 – 2 | US Changé |
| 18 October | 15:00 | FA Laval | 0 – 0; 4 - 3 pen. | Chateau Gont. Anc. |
| 18 October | 15:00 | AS La Milesse | 0 – 1 | ES Bonchamp |
| 18 October | 15:00 | Saint Mars La Briere | 1 – 0 | Le Mans Villaret |
| 18 October | 15:00 | US Vibraye | 0 – 1 | La Flèche RC |

=== Martinique ===
| Date | Kick Off | Home | Result | Away |

=== Mayotte ===
| Kick Off | Home | Result | Away |

=== Méditerranée ===
| Date | Kick Off | Home | Result | Away |
|---|---|---|---|---|
| 17 October | 16:00 | AS Cannes | 5 – 1 | US Le Pontet |
| 17 October | 18:00 | Avignon Foot 84 | 1 – 2 | SO Cassis Carnoux |
| 18 October | 14:30 | Euga Ardziv | 1 – 1; 4 - 1 pen. | Hyères FC |
| 18 October | 14:30 | FC Istres | 1 – 2 | T. Le Las |
| 18 October | 14:30 | Sporting Toulon | 0 – 0; 9 - 8 pen. | Cannet Roche |
| 18 October | 15:00 | JS Saint Jean Beaulieu | 2 – 0 | FC Martigues |
| 18 October | 15:00 | E.F.C.F.S.R | 4 – 0 | Marseille Consolat |
| 18 October | 15:00 | ARS Belsunce | 1 – 3 | US Marignane |

=== Midi-Pyrénées ===
| Kick Off | Home | Result | Away |

=== New Caledonia ===
| Date | Kick Off | Home | Result | Away |
|---|---|---|---|---|
| 23 May | 18:00 | Thio Sport | 0 – 2 | AS Magenta |
| 23 May | 20:00 | Mouli Sport | 3 – 4 | AS Mont-Dore |

=== Nord-Pas de Calais ===
| Kick Off | Home | Result | Away |

=== Picardie ===
| Kick Off | Home | Result | Away |

=== Réunion ===
| Date | Kick Off | Home | Result | Away |
|---|---|---|---|---|
| | | | – | |

=== Rhône-Alpes ===
| Kick Off | Home | Result | Away |

== Sixth round ==
=== Alsace ===
| Date | Kick Off | Home | Result | Away |
|---|---|---|---|---|
| 31 October | 17:00 | AS Illzach Modenheim | 1 – 4 | FC Saint-Louis Neuweg |
| 31 October | 19:00 | Pfastatt FC | 1 – 4 | US Sarre-Union |
| 1 November | 14:15 | Roppenheim | – | Bischheim Soleil |
| 1 November | 14:15 | Oberlauterbach | 1 – 0 | Hirtzbach |
| 1 November | 14:15 | Obermodern | 0 – 1 | ASC Biesheim |
| 1 November | 14:15 | ASL Strasbourg Robertsau | – | Sundhoffen |
| 1 November | 15:00 | FC Mulhouse | 4 – 1 | Steinseltz |
| 1 November | 16:00 | Munchhouse FC | 0 – 6 | SR Colmar |

=== Aquitaine ===
| Date | Kick Off | Home | Result | Away |
|---|---|---|---|---|
| 31 October | 19:00 | Bayonne Cr. | 0 – 4 | Trélissac FC |
| 31 October | 19:00 | J. Villenave | 0 – 1 | Pau FC |
| 1 November | 14:30 | US Labrede | 2 – 3 | SU Agen Lot-et-Garonne |
| 1 November | 14:30 | ES Ambaresienne | 0 – 1 a.e.t | E. Blanquefort |
| 1 November | 16:00 | Bergerac Football | – | Aviron Bayonnais FC |

=== Auvergne ===
| Date | Kick Off | Home | Result | Away |
|---|---|---|---|---|
| 31 October | 18:00 | FC Cournon-d'Auvergne | 1 – 1; 3 - 4 pen. | SA Thiers |
| 31 October | 19:00 | Le Puy F. 43 Auvergne | 1 – 5 | ÉDS Montluçon |
| 31 October | 20:00 | AS Yzeure | 4 – 1 | Entente Moulins Yzeure |
| 31 October | 20:00 | AS Espinat | 0 – 11 | AS Moulins |
| 1 November | 14:30 | US Murat | – | Saint Germain Fosses |

=== Basse-Normandie ===
| Date | Kick Off | Home | Result | Away |
|---|---|---|---|---|
| 31 October | 18:00 | FC Flers | 2 – 1 | USON Mondeville |
| 31 October | 19:00 | FC Bayeux | 1 – 1; 3 - 4 pen. | AS Cherbourg Football |
| 1 November | 14:30 | FC Agneaux | 0 – 6 | US Granville |
| 1 November | 14:30 | US Thaon FVM | 1 – 3 | US Avranches |

=== Bourgogne ===
| Date | Kick Off | Home | Result | Away |
|---|---|---|---|---|
| 31 October | 17:00 | Etang-Arroux | 0 – 1 | Nevers Football |
| 31 October | 18:00 | SC Selongey | 3 – 2 | CS Louhans-Cuiseaux |
| 31 October | 18:00 | FC Montceau Bourgogne | 1 – 1; 4 - 2 pen. | Snid |
| 1 November | 15:00 | AS Quetigny | – | Sens FC |

=== Bretagne ===
| Kick Off | Home | Result | Away |

=== Centre ===
| Date | Kick Off | Home | Result | Away |

=== Centre-Ouest ===
| Kick Off | Home | Result | Away |

=== Champagne-Ardenne ===
| Kick Off | Home | Result | Away |

=== Corsica ===
| Date | Kick Off | Home | Result | Away |
|---|---|---|---|---|
| 31 October | 15:00 | CA Bastia | 0 – 1 | FCA Calvi |
| 1 November | 14:30 | FC Borgo | 2 – 1 | Gazélec Ajaccio |

=== Franche-Comté ===
| Kick Off | Home | Result | Away |

=== Guadeloupe ===
| Kick Off | Home | Result | Away |

=== Haute-Normandie ===
| Kick Off | Home | Result | Away |

=== Île-de-France ===
| Kick Off | Home | Result | Away |

=== Languedoc-Roussillon ===
| Kick Off | Home | Result | Away |

=== Lorraine ===
| Kick Off | Home | Result | Away |

=== Maine ===
| Kick Off | Home | Result | Away |

=== Martinique ===
| Date | Kick Off | Home | Result | Away |

=== Mayotte ===
| Kick Off | Home | Result | Away |

=== Méditerranée ===
| Date | Kick Off | Home | Result | Away |

=== Midi-Pyrénées ===
| Kick Off | Home | Result | Away |

=== New Caledonia ===
| Date | Kick Off | Home | Result | Away |
|---|---|---|---|---|
| 23 May | 18:00 | AS Magenta | 3 – 3; 2 - 4 pen. | AS Mont-Dore |

=== Nord-Pas de Calais ===
| Kick Off | Home | Result | Away |

=== Picardie ===
| Kick Off | Home | Result | Away |

=== Provence-Alpes-Côte d'Azur ===
| Kick Off | Home | Result | Away |

=== Réunion ===
| Date | Kick Off | Home | Result | Away |
|---|---|---|---|---|
| 8 November | 16:30 | AS Excelsior | 2 – 1 | US Ste-Marie |

=== Rhône-Alpes ===
| Kick Off | Home | Result | Away |

== See also ==
- 2009–10 Coupe de France
- 2009–10 Coupe de France preliminary round
- 2009–10 Coupe de France 1st round
- 2009–10 Coupe de France 2nd round
- 2009–10 Coupe de France 3rd through 4th rounds
- 2009–10 Ligue 1
- 2009–10 Ligue 2
- 2009–10 Championnat National
- 2009–10 Championnat de France Amateur
- 2009–10 Championnat de France amateur 2
