= Saint-Avertin Sports =

French football club

Saint-Avertin
- Full name: Saint-Avertin Sports Football
- Founded: 1924
- Ground: Stade des Grands Champs, Saint-Avertin
- Chairman: Sebastian Briot
- Manager: Jean-Claude Tornay
- League: Division d'Honneur Regionale de Centre
Home colours

Saint-Avertin Sports Football is a French association football club founded in 1924. They are based in the town of Saint-Avertin and their home stadium is the Stade des Grands Champs. As of the 2009–10 season, the club plays in the Division d'Honneur Regionale de Centre, the seventh tier of French football.
