= OC Châteaudun =

French football club

Châteaudun
- Full name: Olympique Club Châteaudun
- Founded: 1959
- Ground: Stade Kléber et Albert Provost, Châteaudun
- Capacity: 3,300
- Chairman: Gilles Provost
- League: Division d'Honneur Regionale de Centre
- 2008–09: Division d'Honneur Regionale de Centre, 6th

Olympic Club Châteaudun is a French association football club founded in 1959 as a result of a merger between ES Châteaudun and AS Saint-Jean. They are based in the town of Châteaudun and their home stadium is the Stade Kléber et Albert Provost, which has a capacity of around 3,300 spectators. As of the 2009–10 season, the club plays in the Division d'Honneur Regionale de Centre, the seventh tier of French football.
