= AS Gien =

French football club

Gien
- Full name: Association Sportive de Gien
- Ground: Stade Municipal Wilson, Gien
- Chairman: Bouna Kante
- League: Division d'Honneur Regionale de Centre

Association Sportive de Gien is a French association football club. They are based in the town of Gien and their home stadium is the Stade Municipal Wilson. As of the 2009–10 season, the club plays in the Division d'Honneur Regionale de Centre, the seventh tier of French football.
