= 2016–17 Coupe de France first preliminary rounds =

The 2016–17 Coupe de France First preliminary rounds comprised the first rounds of the 2016–17 Coupe de France preliminary rounds. The competition was organised by the French Football Federation (FFF) and was made up of separate sections for each regional league in France as well as the overseas departments and territories (Guadeloupe, French Guiana, Martinique, Mayotte, Réunion, and Saint Martin).

== Second preliminary round ==
=== Réunion ===
These matches were played between 20 and 25 May 2016.

Second preliminary round results: Réunion

Tie no	Home team (tier)	Score	Away team (tier)
1.	(Réunion) AEFC Ouest (D2D)	2–0	Red Star Bras Chevrettes (D3D) (Réunion)
2.	(Réunion) Cilaos FC (D2D)	8–1	Ecole Foot St Giles (D3D) (Réunion)
3.	(Réunion) AEFC Etang St Leu (D2D)	1–2	ASM Bras Fusil (D3D) (Réunion)
4.	(Réunion) Vincendo Sport (D2D)	1–0	Cambuston FC (D3D) (Réunion)
5.	(Réunion) JS Cressonniere (D2D)	0–2	RC Austral (D3D) (Réunion)
6.	(Réunion) AS Eveche (D2D)	4–0	Amicale Chaloupe St Leu (D3D) (Réunion)
7.	(Réunion) AFC Saint Laurent (D2D)	6–2	SS Juniors Dionysiens (D2D) (Réunion)
8.	(Réunion) AE Solidaire Convenance (D2D)	3–0	SS Charles de Foucauald (D2D) (Réunion)
9.	(Réunion) ASC Corbeil (D2D)	0–2	US Bellemene Canot (D2D) (Réunion)
10.	(Réunion) CS St Gilles (D2D)	7–2	AFC La Cour (D2D) (Réunion)
11.	(Réunion) FC Pannonais (D2D)	2–1	CS Dynamo (D2D) (Réunion)
12.	(Réunion) FC Moufia (D2D)	1–0	ACF Possession (D3D) (Réunion)
13.	(Réunion) JSC Ravine Creuse (D3D)	5–2	AS Guillaume (D2D) (Réunion)
14.	(Réunion) SC Palmiplainois (D3D)	1–5	Pierrefonds Sports (D2D) (Réunion)
15.	(Réunion) AS Langevin La Balance (D3D)	1–0	AS Montgaillard (D2D) (Réunion)
16.	(Réunion) AS Poudrière (D2D)	7–1	Olympique Foot Entre Deux (D3D) (Réunion)
17.	(Réunion) Sainte Rose FC (D3D)	2–1	AS Du Plate (D2D) (Réunion)
18.	(Réunion) JS Boise de Nefles (D2D)	6–1	AS Saint Yves (D3D) (Réunion)
19.	(Réunion) FC 17éme Km (D2D)	8–1	AJS Ravinoise (D3D) (Réunion)
20.	(Réunion) AS Espoir Tan Rouge (D2D)	6–1	US Ste Anne (D2D) (Réunion)
21.	(Réunion) Jean Petit FC St Joseph (D2D)	2–1	ASC Monaco (D2D) (Réunion)
22.	(Réunion) FC Parfin Saint-Andre (D2D)	3–2	FC Riviere Des Galets (D2D) (Réunion)
23.	(Réunion) La Tamponnaise (D2D)	7–0	Academise S Redoute (D2D) (Réunion)
24.	(Réunion) JS Bras Creux (D2D)	2–0	AS Red Star (D2D) (Réunion)
25.	(Réunion) US Tevelave (D3D)	2–4	SC Bellepierre (D2D) (Réunion)
26.	(Réunion) Ravine Blanche (D2D)	5–1	GS Berive (D3D) (Réunion)
27.	(Réunion) AJ Ligne Bambous (D2D)	1–4	AJS Bois d'Olives (D2D) (Réunion)
28.	(Réunion) Tampon FC (D2D)	4–2	FC Ylang (D3D) (Réunion)
29.	(Réunion) AS Etoile du Sud (D2D)	3–2	ASC Makes (D2D) (Réunion)
30.	(Réunion) ES Etang Sale (D2D)	4–1	SC Chaudron (D2D) (Réunion)

Note: Reúnion League Structure (no promotion to French League Structure):
Division 1 Régionale (D1R)
Division 2 Régionale (D2R)
Division 2 Départementale (D2D)
Division 3 Départementale (D3D)

== First round ==
=== Mayotte ===
These matches played on 20 February 2016

First round results: Mayotte

Tie no	Home team (tier)	Score	Away team (tier)
1.	(Mayotte) Olympique de Miréréni (PH)	1–2 (a.e.t.)	FC Sohoa (PH) (Mayotte)
2.	(Mayotte) AJ Kani-kéli (PH)	2–0	Tchanga SC (DHT) (Mayotte)
3.	(Mayotte) USCJ Koungou (DHT)	4–0	RCES Poroani (PH) (Mayotte)
4.	(Mayotte) Voulvavi Sports (PH)	1–0	USC Labattoir (PH) (Mayotte)
5.	(Mayotte) FC Labattoir (DHT)	1–0	Enfant du Port (PH) (Mayotte)
6.	(Mayotte) FCO Tsingoni (DHT)	3–0	AJ Mtsahara (PH) (Mayotte)
7.	(Mayotte) Choungui FC (PH)	1–3	Enfants de Mayotte (DHT)
8.	(Mayotte) US Mtsagamboua (PH)	3–1	TCO Mamoudzou (PH) (Mayotte)
9.	(Mayotte) Feu du Centre (PH)	1–3	FC Chiconi (PH) (Mayotte)
10.	(Mayotte) FC Shingabwé (PH)	1–2 (a.e.t.)	Missile Rouge (DHT) (Mayotte)
11.	(Mayotte) US Kavani (PH)	0–1 (a.e.t.)	CS Mramadoudou (PH) (Mayotte)
12.	(Mayotte) USB Tama Djema (PH)	1–1 (a.e.t.) (4–5 p)	Bandrélé Foot (PH) (Mayotte)
13.	(Mayotte) AS Racine Du Nord (DHT)	3–0	RC Barakani (PH) (Mayotte)
14.	(Mayotte) VSS Hagnoundrou (PH)	1–2	ASJ Moinatrindri (DHT) (Mayotte)

Note: Mayotte League Structure (no promotion to French League Structure):
Division d'Honneur (DH)
Division d'Honneur Territoriale (DHT)
Promotion d'Honneur (PH)

=== Réunion ===
These matches were played between 17 and 19 June 2016.

First round results: Réunion

Tie no	Home team (tier)	Score	Away team (tier)
1.	(Réunion) CO St Pierre (D2R)	1–4	AS Etoile du Sud (D2D) (Réunion)
2.	(Réunion) SS Rivière Sport (D2D)	2–1	RC St Benoit (D1R) (Réunion)
3.	(Réunion) ASM Bras Fusil (D3D)	0–1	Saint-Denis FC (D1R) (Réunion)
4.	(Réunion) AFC Saint Laurent (D2D)	1–0	FC Parfin Saint-Andre (D2D) (Réunion)
5.	(Réunion) JC Saint-Pierrois (D2R)	2–1	AE Solidaire Convenance (D2D) (Réunion)
6.	(Réunion) RC Austral (D3D)	1–2	FC Avirons (D2R) (Réunion)
7.	(Réunion) AS Bretagne (D2R)	0–1	US Bellemene Canot (D2D) (Réunion)
8.	(Réunion) AS Eveche (D2D)	1–0	FC Ligne Paradis (D2R) (Réunion)
9.	(Réunion) Saint-Pauloise FC (D1R)	5–1	JS Boise de Nefles (D2D) (Réunion)
10.	(Réunion) Jean Petit FC St Joseph (D2D)	0–3	SS Jeanne d'Arc (D1R) (Réunion)
11.	(Réunion) AS Saint-Louisienne (D1R)	0–0 (3–5 p)	La Tamponnaise (D2D) (Réunion)
12.	(Réunion) AS Capricorne (D1R)	9–0	AS 12ème Km (D3D) (Réunion)
13.	(Réunion) JS Piton St Leu (D1R)	2–1	FC Plaine des Grègues (D2D) (Réunion)
14.	(Réunion) OC St Andre les Léopards (D2R)	3–1	Ravine Blanche (D2D) (Réunion)
15.	(Réunion) AFC Halte-La (D2R)	2–2 (3–4 p)	FC 17éme Km (D2D) (Réunion)
16.	(Réunion) ASE Grande Montée (D2D)	1–3	Vincendo Sport (D2D) (Réunion)
17.	(Réunion) JS Bellemene 2007 (D2D)	8–1	AS Langevin La Balance (D3D) (Réunion)
18.	(Réunion) JS Saint-Pierroise (D1R)	3–0	Cilaos FC (D2D) (Réunion)
19.	(Réunion) JSC Ravine Creuse (D3D)	0–17	US Sainte-Marienne (D1R) (Réunion)
20.	(Réunion) AJ Petite-Île (D1R)	4–1	JS Champbornoise (D2D) (Réunion)
21.	(Réunion) Pierrefonds Sports (D2D)	0–1	AS Excelsior (D1R) (Réunion)
22.	(Réunion) AS Grand Fond (D2R)	6–1	AJS Bois d'Olives (D2D) (Réunion)
23.	(Réunion) Sainte Rose FC (D3D)	0–3	AS Saint-Suzanne (D1R) (Réunion)
24.	(Réunion) AS St Philippe (D2R)	5–1	FC Moufia (D2D) (Réunion)
25.	(Réunion) AJS de l'Ouest (D2R)	6–1	AEFC Ouest (D2D) (Réunion)
26.	(Réunion) AS Poudrière (D2D)	0–0 (5–6 p)	Saint Denis EDFA (D1R) (Réunion)
27.	(Réunion) Tampon FC (D2D)	0–7	AS Marsouins (D1R) (Réunion)
28.	(Réunion) AS Espoir Tan Rouge (D2D)	0–2	Trois Bassins FC (D2R) (Réunion)
29.	(Réunion) AF Saint-Louisien (D2R)	3–1	CS St Gilles (D2D) (Réunion)
30.	(Réunion) JS Bras Creux (D2D)	2–0	SC Bellepierre (D2D) (Réunion)
31.	(Réunion) ASC Grands Bois (D2R)	2–1	ES Etang Sale (D2D) (Réunion)
32.	(Réunion) FC Bagatelle Sainte-Suzanne (D2R)	3–1	FC Pannonais (D2D) (Réunion)

Note: Reúnion League Structure (no promotion to French League Structure):
Division 1 Régionale (D1R)
Division 2 Régionale (D2R)
Division 2 Départementale (D2D)
Division 3 Départementale (D3D)

=== Paris-Île-de-France ===
These matches were played between 24 April and 5 May 2016. Note that Tiers refer to the 2015–16 season.

First round results: Île-de-France

Tie no	Home team (tier)	Score	Away team (tier)
1.	FC Provins MJC (10)	2–4	US Grigny (10)
2.	FC Brunoy (12)	4–2	ES Villiers-sur-Marne (12)
3.	SO Houilles (13)	3–6	Villeneuve-la-Garenne (12)
4.	FC Moret-Veneux Sablons (10)	5–3 (a.e.t.)	CO Vigneux (10)
5.	Vaux-le-Pénil La Rochette (11)	1–2	Cheminots Villeneuve-Saint-Georges (11)
6.	FC Magny-les-Hameaux 78 (12)	4–0	FC Nandy (10)
7.	JS Pontoisienne (10)	1–3	La Plaine-Saint-Denis (13)
8.	ES Jeunes Stade (12)	4–0	AS Entente Brie Est La Ferté-Gaucher (12)
9.	Bonnières-sur-Seine Freneuse (14)	3–4	FC Chaville (14)
10.	Viking Club de Paris (14)	0–1	Saint-Michel-sur-Orge Sports (11)
11.	Morsang-sur-Orge FC (14)	2–3	USM Les Clayes-sous-Bois (11)
12.	Briard SC (10)	3–2	Saint-Thibault-des-Vignes FC (11)
13.	Drancy FC (12)	3–0	Gonesse RC (11)
14.	AS Ultra Marine Paris (14)	2–0	AS Paris 18 (14)
15.	ES Frettoise (12)	0–3	US Chanteloup-les-Vignes (10)
16.	ES Magnanville (12)	1–6	FC Saint-Butt (11)
17.	FC Varennes-sur-Seine (13)	1–3	Saint-Germain-lès-Corbeil-Saintry-sur-Seine (11)
18.	Marcoussis Nozay La-Ville-du-Bois FC (11)	1–0	AS Montigny-le-Bretonneux (11)
19.	Villepinte Flamboyants (11)	1–0	Meaux ADOM (11)
20.	Houdanaise Région Orgerus FC (14)	7–2	Parisud Paris FC (15)
21.	CSM Clamart Foot (10)	1–6	FO Plaisirois (11)
22.	AS Vexin (11)	0–3	ALJ Limay (10)
23.	Olympique Viarmes Asnières-sur-Oise (12)	2–4	CO Othis (11)
24.	Bailly Noisy-le-Roi SFC (11)	3–3 (4–2 p)	Inter Massy (14)
25.	US Ézanville-Écouen (11)	4–0	US Carrières-sur-Seine (14)
26.	Gargenville Stade (12)	2–1	FC Jouy-le-Moutier (11)
27.	COM Bagneux (11)	8–2	US Mauloise (12)
28.	AS Paris (11)	7–1	Benfica Argoselo Sports Paris (14)
29.	Conflans-Sainte-Honorine Patronage (15)	2–6	Assyro Chaldéens Sarcelles (13)
30.	Saint-Mandé FC (11)	4–1	US Ris-Orangis (11)
31.	Enfants de Passy Paris (14)	5–2	AS Issou (14)
32.	La Camillienne Sports 12ème (11)	3–1	Nicolaïte Chaillot Paris (10)
33.	Racine Club Asnières-sur-Seine (15)	0–5 (Note: Game won by forfeit)	US Verneuil-sur-Seine (10)
34.	AJ Antony (12)	2–5	FC Le Chesnay 78 (10)
35.	Portugais Conflans (15)	1–3	FC Groslay (11)
36.	FC Coignières (13)	2–5	Olympique Neuilly (10)
37.	ES Vauxoise (15)	4–4 (4–5 p)	SFC Champagne 95 (13)
38.	Entente Méry-Mériel Bessancourt (12)	0–11	US Marly-le-Roi (10)
39.	AS Éclair de Puiseux (14)	3–2	AS Annet-sur-Marne (10)
40.	AS Ermont (11)	2–1	AS Carrières Grésillons (11)
41.	Fouilleuse FC (14)	5–0	Maison Culturelle des Antoliens FC (13)
42.	ES St Prix (11)	1–2	CS Achères (12)
43.	US Roissy-en-France (11)	1–2	USM Villeparisis (10)
44.	Courtry Foot (14)	4–2	AS Arnouville (12)
45.	Bonneuil-en-France (13)	4–1	AS Breuilloise (13)
46.	Fontenay-en-Parisis (12)	3–6	FC Aulnay (11)
47.	Union Fosses (12)	2–3	SC Dugny (11)
48.	Cosmo Taverny (10)	5–0	US Croissy (13)
49.	ES Moussy-le-Neuf (13)	2–1	FC Puiseux-Louvres (12)
50.	FC Nanteuil-lès-Meaux (14)	0–1	CA Romainville (13)
51.	Aubergenville FC (11)	5–1	ES Seizième (10)
52.	USBS Épône (12)	6–1	LSO Colombes (10)
53.	AS Guerville-Arnouville (15)	2–0	FC Rueil Malmaison (10)
54.	ASF Guitrancourt (14)	1–6	Argenteuil FC (11)
55.	AS Guernoise (15)	1–1 (4–2 p)	USO Bezons (11)
56.	CS Ternes Paris-Oueste (15)	1–3	ES Bouafle-Flins (14)
57.	Enfants de Gennevilliers (15)	0–12	FC Villennes-Orgeval (11)
58.	Bougival (12)	1–4	Salésienne de Paris (12)
59.	AS St Mard (12)	2–0	Avenir Survilliers (13)
60.	ACS Cormeillais (11)	2–3	Sartrouville FC (11)
61.	CO Cheminots Chambly (13)	0–3	Mitry-Mory (11)
62.	AS Mesnil-le-Roi (14)	1–3	AS Beauchamp (11)
63.	Soisy-Andilly-Margency FC (12)	6–0	CS Dammartin (11)
64.	CS Villetaneuse (12)	1–0	FC Auvers-Ennery (11)
65.	AC Triel (13)	1–2	Éragny FC (12)
66.	ES Boissy L'Aillerie (14)	0–5	Olympique Mantes FC (15)
67.	ES St-Pathus Oissery (11)	0–5	ES Marly-la-Ville (10)
68.	AS Courdimanche (12)	2–3	ES Stains (11)
69.	FC Montmorency (12)	4–5	Épinay Académie (10)
70.	Arronville FC (13)	0–2	CSM Rosny-sur-Seine (11)
71.	Pierrefitte FC (12)	1–0	FC Deuil-Enghien (10)
72.	JS Villiers-le-Bel (12)	2–2 (4–3 p)	Espérance Aulnay (10)
73.	Fraternelle Sportive Esbly (13)	0–5	US Persan (10)
74.	Stade Vernolitain (14)	1–2	Olympique Montigny (11)
75.	FC Domont (11)	2–1	OFC Couronnes (12)
76.	USL Presles (13)	3–4	Goellycompans FC (12)
77.	FC Andresy (12)	1–6	Osny FC (10)
78.	AS Le Pin-Villevaude (12)	1–0 (a.e.t.)	USM Bruyères-Bernes (13)
79.	ASC La Courneuve (11)	4–1	AS Menucourt (12)
80.	GAF Plessis-Bouchard (12)	1–2	Marocains de Figuig (13)
81.	Cosmos St Denis (11)	0–2	FCM Garges-Les-Gonesse (10)
82.	Juziers FC (15)	1–1 (4–2 p)	AC Parmain (13)
83.	AS Neuville-sur-Oise (12)	2–2 (5–6 p)	ASM Chambourcy (12)
84.	US Saint Arnoult (14)	2–2 (4–3 p)	AS Meudon (12)
85.	AJ Étampoise (14)	7–3	Ablis FC Sud 78 (15)
86.	FC Rambouillet Yvelines (12)	1–2	FC Étampes (10)
87.	FC Lissois (11)	2–1	AO Buc Foot (11)
88.	RC Arpajonnais (11)	2–0	Paris Alésia FC (11)
89.	Olympique Paris 15 (15)	0–9	Breuillet FC (12)
90.	FC La Verrière (15)	1–4	JSC Pitray-Olier (13)
91.	FC St Vrain (14)	0–3	CA Vitry (10)
92.	TU Verrières-le-Buisson (11)	3–4	FC Vallée 78 (10)
93.	US 17 Tournants (14)	5–0	CO Villiers (14)
94.	AAS Fresnes (14)	2–0	Dourdan Sport (12)
95.	AS Angervilliers (11)	1–7	AS Bois d'Arcy (11)
96.	AS Ballainvilliers (14)	5–0	ASL Mesnil St Denis (13)
97.	Bondoufle Amical Club (13)	1–3	USC Lesigny (11)
98.	Entente du Pays de Limours (12)	2–1	ASA Montereau (11)
99.	ES Nangis (12)	0–3	CS Mennecy (11)
100.	US Grande Paroisse (13)	0–1	FC Portugais US Ris-Orangis (13)
101.	ES Perray (12)	0–3	CA L'Haÿ-les-Roses (11)
102.	Turc FC Montereau (12)	3–1	AS Corbeil-Essonnes (10)
103.	Draveil FC (11)	1–3	E Longueville Ste Colombe St Loup-de-Naud Soisy-Bouy (10)
104.	ASM Jouarre	w/o	FC Intercommunal Loing (10)
105.	UF Portugais Meaux (14)	0–4 (a.e.t.)	USM Verneuil (12)
106.	US Vert-le-Grand (14)	1–2 (a.e.t.)	US Ponthierry (10)
107.	FC Ballancourt (12)	0–5	FC Bois-le-Roi (11)
108.	Amicale Bocage (13)	1–7	FC Milly-la-Forêt (12)
109.	Aigle Fertoise Boissy le Cutté (13)	0–2	US Avonnaise (10)
110.	ES Forêt (13)	0–1	FC Massy 91 (10)
111.	AC Villenoy (13)	5–0	ES Jouy-Yvron (13)
112.	Alliance Brie 77 (13)	0–6	ES Guyancourt St Quentin-en-Yvelines (10)
113.	ES Saint-Germain-Laval (12)	7–1	Benfica Yerres (13)
114.	OC Gif Section Foot (12)	4–0	CS Cellois (11)
115.	FCM Vauréal (12)	2–4	ESC Ecquevilly (12)
116.	Sèvres FC 92 (11)	4–1	US Hardricourt (11)
117.	AS Fontenay-St Père (15)	1–10	AJSC Nanterre (10)
118.	AS Grenelle (15)	1–4	Mantes USC (14)
119.	Entente Beaumont Mours (12)	1–2 (a.e.t.)	USM Audonienne (11)
120.	Paris Gaels FA (14)	5–0	AS Etoile d'Assyrie (13)
121.	AS Bourg-la-Reine (13)	6–1	AS Ollainville (12)
122.	Moncourt-Fromonville (13)	0–11	US Saclas-Méréville (13)
123.	CO Champlan (14)	4–3	Héricy-Vulaines-Samoreau (13)
124.	US Ville d'Avray (13)	6–8	CA Combs-la-Ville (11)
125.	FC Orsay-Bures (11)	2–4 (a.e.t.)	Voisins FC (12)
126.	OSC Élancourt (12)	3–1	FC Trois Vallées (13)
127.	ES Villabé (12)	2–1	US Jouy-en-Josas (12)
128.	AS Bruyères (14)	3–1	AFC St Cyr (13)
129.	SO Vertois (13)	1–3	ASC Velizy (11)
130.	AS Fontenay-le-Fleury (13)	0–5	FC Épinay Athlético (11)
131.	FC Beynes (13)	2–2 (3–2 p)	JS Longjumelloise (11)
132.	AGS Essarts-le-Roi (15)	0–3	AS Fontenay-aux-Roses (12)
133.	US Yvelines (13)	1–2	ES Petit Anges Paris (13)
134.	AS Versailles Jussieu (15)	4–2	Phare Sportive Zarzissien (13)
135.	AS Sud Essonne (11)	0–1 (Note: Result reversed. AS Sud Essonne progressed to Second Round)	Gatinais Val de Loing (11)
136.	CO Cachan (11)	3–1	AS Soisy-sur-Seine (11)
137.	ASL Janville Lardy (12)	2–3	AJ Limeil-Brévannes (11)
138.	FC Villemoisson (13)	0–1	US Ormesson-sur-Marne (11)
139.	FC Boissy-sous-St Yon (14)	0–1	US Villejuif (10)
140.	FC Longjumeau (11)	2–0	AS Lieusaint (11)
141.	AS Chelles (11)	0–1	FC Nogent-sur-Marne (10)
142.	USD Ferrières-en-Brie (12)	4–0	RC Joinville (11)
143.	ASF Le Perreux (10)	2–2 (3–1 p)	US Quincy-Voisins FC (10)
144.	UMS Pontault-Combault (12)	5–0	FC Marolles (13)
145.	UJ Boissy (13)	0–5	AS Fontenay-Trésigny (11)
146.	FC Vaujours (13)	2–3	ASM Ferté-sous-Jouarre (11)
147.	USF Trilport (11)	1–2	OFC Pantin (10)
148.	Neuilly-Plaisance Sports (13)	0–2	AS Champs-sur-Marne (10)
149.	USM Gagny (13)	4–3	CS Mouroux (14)
150.	US Petit Morin (14)	0–5	SO Rosny-sous-Bois (11)
151.	CSM Coubron (11)	0–1	SC Gretz-Tournan (11)
152.	FC Garches Vaucresson (15)	1–5	FC Bréval-Longnes (13)
153.	FC Boissy (12)	2–3	US Roissy-en-Brie (10)
154.	SO Rozay-en-Brie (13)	1–2	US Villeneuve Ablon (11)
155.	AS Neufmoutiers Villeneuve	0–5	US Chaumes-Gignes (11)
156.	FC Chevry Cossigny 77 (13)	7–4 (a.e.t.)	AS Couilly-St Germain (12)
157.	CAP Charenton (10)	3–2	AS Choisy-en-Brie (10)
158.	FC Bourget (11)	7–1	FC La Plaine de France (11)
159.	AS Croissy-Beaubourg (13)	0–5	FC Maisons Alfort (10)
160.	FC Émerainville (13)	1–7	US Fontenay-sous-Bois (10)
161.	A Portugais Académica Champigny (13)	1–2 (a.e.t.)	Portugais Pontault-Combault (10)
162.	ES Montreuil (12)	5–0	AS Collégien (11)
163.	Entente Sportive Créteil (13)	1–7	Bussy St Georges FC (11)
164.	Thiais FC (12)	3–2	Noisiel FC (11)
165.	UF Pommeuse-Farmoutiers (13)	0–4	UF Créteil (13)
166.	Stade de l'Est Pavillonnais (10)	6–2	Pays Créçois FC (11)
167.	FA Le Raincy (12)	1–2	Magny-le-Hongre FC (11)
168.	FC Montry-Condé (13)	1–2	FC Romainville (11)
169.	SC Bagnolet (13)	1–3 (a.e.t.)	Coulommiers Brie (10)
170.	US Lagny Messagers (11)	2–0	AJ du Pavé Neuf Noisy-le-Grand (13)
171.	AS Varreddes (14)	0–3	JS Bondy (12)
172.	ASS Noiséenne (13)	0–5	Val de France Foot (10)
173.	AJN Bagnolet (11)	2–0	FC Ozoir-la-Ferrière 77 (10)
174.	FC Gournay (13)	12–0	FC Brie-des-Morin (13)
175.	Champs FC (13)	1–5	Paris Université Club (11)
176.	Brie FC (14)	1–2	Espérance Paris 19ème (11)
177.	AS Outre-Mer du Bois l'Abbé (14)	5–0	CA Lizéen
178.	ES Caudacienne (12)	3–4 (a.e.t.)	AS Bondy (10)
179.	FC Boussy-St Antoine (12)	3–4	ES Vitry (10)
180.	Stade Parisien FC (12)	5–0	CSA Kremlin-Bicêtre (11)
181.	COSM Arcueil (14)	2–0	Ménilmontant FC 1871 (14)
182.	ASPTT Gentilly (14)	1–0	Villebon Sport Football (11)
183.	Lutetia FC (14)	0–9	UF Clichois (10)
184.	AP Sainte-Mélanie (13)	1–0	SC Épinay-sur-Orge (11)
185.	ES Montgeron (10)	3–0	Mimosa Mada-Sport (13)
186.	SCM Châtillonnais (12)	8–1	ES Plateau de Saclay (13)
187.	FC Athis Mons (11)	3–2	AS Maurepas (10)
188.	ESC XVème (14)	0–3	Villepreux FC (11)
189.	FC Antillais de Vigneux-sur-Seine (14)	1–2	RC Pays de Fontainebleau (10)
190.	FC Montfort L'Amaury-Yvelines	0–5	SS Voltaire Châtenay-Malabry (11)
191.	US Montesson (13)	0–1	Enfants de la Goutte d'Or (12)
192.	FC St Germain-en-Laye (15)	2–5	FC Asnières (12)
193.	FC Wiener (15)	w/o	Footballeurs???
194.	FC Antillais Paris 19ème (14)	1–7	Stade Vanves (10)
195.	AS Cheminots Ouest (15)	5–0	CMS de Pantin (11)
196.	Panamicaine FC (15)	3–4	OMJ Aubervilliers (14)
197.	Guyane FC Paris (14)	2–4	FC Solitaires Paris Est (10)
198.	RC Paris Nord (14)	0–5	Travailleurs Maghrébins (15)
199.	Les Petits Pains (15)	2–3	Maisons-Laffitte FC (13)
200.	AC Paris 15 (12)	4–0	FC Wissous (11)
201.	Sport Pars Benfica (15)	3–4	Étoile FC Bobigny (13)
202.	CS Pouchet Paris XVII (14)	5–0	ESC Paris (14)

=== Picardie ===
These matches were played between 10 and 25 June 2016. Note that Tiers refer to the 2015–16 season.

First round results: Picardie

Tie no	Home team (tier)	Score	Away team (tier)
1.	ESUS Buironfosse-La Capelle (10)	2–1	US Buire-Hirson-Thiérache (8)
2.	US Origny-Thenelles (10)	1–4	US Guise (8)
3.	FC Fontainois (13)	1–6	SC Origny-en-Thiérache (10)
4.	FR Englebelmer (11)	1–3	US Corbie (10)
5.	AS Quesnoy-le-Montant (11)	0–0 (4–5 p)	US Abbeville (10)
6.	CS Aubenton (11)	0–3	Le Nouvion AC (10)
7.	US Alnois-sous-Laon (12)	0–2	FC Monceau Les Leups (11)
8.	BCV FC (9)	3–1	US Vallée de l'Ailette (10)
9.	AS Beaurevoir (11)	3–0 (Note: US Vadencourtois penalised. Original result was 2–1)	US Vadencourtois (12)
10.	FC Billy-sur-Aisne (11)	3–1	Reveil Nogentais (10)
11.	La Concorde de Bucy-les-Pierrepont (12)	3–4	FFC Chéry-lès-Pouilly (10)
12.	ES Clacy-Mons (12)	0–1	L'Arsenal Club Achery-Beautor-Charmes (8)
13.	FJEP Coincy (12)	2–3	UA Fère-en-Tardenois (8)
14.	FC Courmelles (12)	0–3 (Note: Result subject to review)	US Prémontré St Gobain (9)
15.	US Crépy Vivaise (10)	4–1	ES Viry-Noureuil (11)
16.	Entente Crouy-Cuffies (10)	3–0	IEC Château-Thierry (11)
17.	FC Étreillers (12)	1–7	SAS Moy de l'Aisne (11)
18.	FC Fonsomme (11)	1–2	AFC Holnon-Fayet (10)
19.	AC Gricourt (13)	1–4	FC Lesdins (10)
20.	FC Hannapes (12)	0–5	RC Bohain (9)
21.	ASPTT Laon (13)	1–0	FC 3 Châteaux (9)
22.	Fraternelle des Chemniots de Laon (11)	3–3 (5–4 p)	ASA Presles (11)
23.	AS Mennevret (12)	0–6	Stade Portugais St Quentin (10)
24.	FC Mézières (13)	4–2	CSO Athies-sous-Laon (11)
25.	AS Neuilly-St Front (12)	5–1	US Venizel (10)
26.	TFC Neuve-Maison (11)	3–1	NES Boué-Etreux (11)
27.	US Rozoy-sur-Serre (11)	4–1	ES Evergnicourt Neufchâtel (9)
28.	FC St Martin (12)	0–9	US Ribemont Mezieres FC (10)
29.	ASC St Michel (12)	0–4	ES Montcornet (8)
30.	CA St Simon (12)	0–1	FC Amigny-Rouy (9)
31.	US Des Vallées (12)	1–3	AS Milonaise (10)
32.	FC Vaux-Andigny (13)	4–10	Gauchy-Grugies-Biette (8)
33.	ACSF Vic-sur-Aisne (13)	0–6	FC Villers Cotterêts (9)
34.	FC Watigny (13)	0–4	Marle Sports (9)
35.	FC Cempuis (13)	0–3	AF Trie-Château (12)
36.	FC Guignecourt (13)	1–3	AS Ons-en-Bray (11)
37.	FC Coudray-St Germer/La Houssoye (14)	0–3	AS Montchrevreuil (10)
38.	AS Brunvillers-la-Motte (13)	2–1	RC Campremy (11)
39.	Rollot AC (13)	2–4	Stade Ressontois (9)
40.	FC Vineuil-St Firmin (13)	4–3	FC Sacy-St Martin (12)
41.	FC Chiry-Ouscamp (14)	1–3	US Attichy (13)
42.	AS Beaulieu Ecuvilly (13)	2–0	US Baugy-Monchy Humières (11)
43.	US Beuvraignes (14)	0–2	US Lassigny (11)
44.	Canly FC (13)	1–1 (2–4 p)	FC Clairoix (10)
45.	AJ Laboissière-en-Thelle (10)	0–6	AS Allonne (9)
46.	FC Amblainville-Sandricourt (12)	3–1	USC Portugais de Beauvais (8)
47.	AS Verderel-lès-Sauqueuse (11)	1–4	SC Songeons (9)
48.	FC La Neuville-Roy (12)	0–3	US Margny-lès-Compiègne (8)
49.	AS Coye-la-Forêt (12)	1–1 (3–2 p)	FC d'Angy (10)
50.	US Plessis-Brion (11)	0–3	FC Béthisy (9)
51.	CA Venette (12)	1–3	FC Carlepont (10)
52.	AS Péroy-les-Gombries (14)	2–3	AS Thourotte (10)
53.	AS Auneuil (10)	1–3	USR St Crépin-Ibouvillers (9)
54.	FC St Sulpice (14)	0–4	ESF Formerie (11)
55.	US Marseille-en-Beauvaisis (10)	1–3	US Fouquenies (9)
56.	AS Pontpoint (11)	1–3	CS Avilly-St Léonard (9)
57.	AS Verneuil-en-Halatte (11)	1–1 (3–4 p)	USE St Leu d'Esserent (8)
58.	AS St Remy-en-l'Eau (11)	4–5	US Breuil-le-Sec (10)
59.	ES Compiègne (11)	0–3	AS Tracy-le-Mont (9)
60.	US Ribécourt (10)	3–1	ES Valois Multien (8)
61.	SC Lamotte Breuil (10)	2–4	US Estrées-St Denis (9)
62.	AS Elincourt (12)	1–5	ESC Wavignies (10)
63.	CO Beauvais (10)	1–1 (1–3 p)	AS Bornel (10)
64.	Grandvilliers AC (9)	5–2	AS Noailles-Cauvigny (11)
65.	SCC Sérifontaine (11)	1–4	US Meru Sandricourt(8)
66.	US Paillart (11)	4–2	US Gouvieux (10)
67.	US Lamorlaye (10)	3–0	FC Brenouille (10)
68.	AS Breuil-le-Vert (12)	1–3	US Mouy (11)
69.	JSAR Compiègne (11)	2–3	FC Longueil-Annel (8)
70.	AS Montmacq (12)	0–4	ASC Val d'Automne (10)
71.	ES Pays Noyonnais (13)	1–1 (3–4 p)	US Nanteuil FC (10)
72.	AS Plailly (10)	4–0	ES Ormoy-Duvy (11)
73.	FC Longueil-St Marie (13)	0–1	AS St Sauveur (9)
74.	AS Rosoy (13)	2–4	CS Verberie (11)
75.	JS Guiscard (13)	0–3	AS Silly-le-Long (11)
76.	FC Salency (13)	2–1	FC Lagny Plessis (10)
77.	ASPTT Beauvais (11)	0–12	CS Chaumont-en-Vexin (9)
78.	FC Fontainettes St Aubin (13)	2–1	US Crèvecœur-le-Grand (9)
79.	FC Eches-Fosseuse (12)	4–0	US Froissy (11)
80.	FC St Paul (11)	1–4	US St Germer-de-Fly (10)
81.	RC St Omer-en-Chaussée (14)	2–4	AS La Neuville-sur-Oudeuil (12)
82.	FC Jouy-sous-Thelle (13)	1–3	US Bresloise (10)
83.	AS Laigneville (11)	0–6	FC Nointel (9)
84.	JS Bulles (12)	1–2	RC Précy (11)
85.	JS Thieux (12)	0–3	AS Orry-La-Chapelle (10)
86.	Tricot OS (11)	1–5	EC Villers/Bailleul (10)
87.	CS Haudivillers (11)	2–1	US Viller-St Paul (11)
88.	UES Vermand (11)	3–0 (Note: US Sailly-Saillisel penalised. Original result was 1–5)	US Sailly-Saillisel (10)
89.	ES Ste Emilie/Épehy le Ronss (12)	4–3	Olympique Le Hamel (10)
90.	US Daours Vecquemont Bussy Aubigny (11)	1–0	ES Sains/St Fuscien (10)
91.	FC Estrées-Mons (12)	4–3	FC Faubourg de Hem (12)
92.	US Esmery-Hallon (15)	0–3	AS Glisy (12)
93.	Olympique Amiénois (12)	2–1	US Ham (11)
94.	US Marchélepot (12)	2–1	AS Cerisy (10)
95.	ASPTT Amiens (10)	1–2	AS Villers-Bretonneux (8)
96.	US Allonville (15)	1–2	US Harbonnières (12)
97.	ASFR Ribemont Mericourt (13)	3–2	Olympique Damery (11)
98.	US Rosières (9)	3–2	CS Amiens-Montières-Etouvie (9)
99.	US Cartigny (13)	1–4	Amiens Picardie FC (14)
100.	Espoir St Maurice (13)	2–6	AS Querrieu (10)
101.	FC Arvillers (14)	2–1	FC Dompierre-Becquincourt (14)
102.	Auxiloise (10)	1–2	US Lignières-Châtelain (11)
103.	AS Hautvillers-Ouville (13)	2–1	Union Amiens Sud-Est (12)
104.	ABC2F Candas (13)	6–0	AC Mers (10)
105.	FC Pont-de-Metz (15)	0–5	USC Portugais de St Ouen (12)
106.	US Nibas Fressenneville (9)	2–1	FC Mareuil-Caubert (10)
107.	ES Harondel (9)	1–1 (2–4 p)	AS Airaines-Allery (10)
108.	US Moyenneville (13)	4–0	FC Grand-Laviers (10)
109.	AS Valines (10)	2–5	US Friville-Escarbotin (8)
110.	AC Hallencourt (13)	0–1	US Le Crotoy (10)
111.	FC Centuloise (9)	1–0	Poix-Blagny-Croixrault FC (10)
112.	AS Menchecourt-Thuison-Bouvaque (11)	0–5	AS Gamaches (8)
113.	AS Vismes-au-Val (12)	5–5 (2–3 p)	ES Pigeonnier Amiens (9)
114.	SEP Blangy-Bouttencourt (11)	0–4	JS Quevauvillers (8)
115.	US Quend (12)	1–4	ES Deux Valées (9)
116.	Avenir Nouvion-en-Ponthieu (11)	2–3	FC Saleux (10)
117.	AS Woincourt Dargnies (12)	3–4	Association Longpre-Long Conde (12)
118.	US Le Boisle (11)	1–3	FC Oisemont (10)
119.	Entente Sailly-Flibeaucourt Le Titre (11)	0–3	SC Pont Remy (11)
120.	JS Cambron (11)	1–3	CO Woignarue (12)
121.	AAE Feuquières-en-Vimeu (11)	3–4	US Béthencourt-sur-Mer (12)
122.	FC St Valéry Baie de Somme Sud (11)	0–2	CS Crécy-en-Ponthieu (12)
123.	AJ Argœuves (13)	2–1	ASIC Bouttencourt (11)
124.	ASC Bourdon (15)	6–1	AS Huppy (15)
125.	Olympique St Ouen (12)	0–1	ES Chépy (10)
126.	Amiens SO (13)	6–3	US Flesselles (11)
127.	FC Lehaucourt (13)	1–5	US Seboncourt (10)
128.	FC Blangy-Tronville (12)	0–4	US Ouvriere Albert (9)
129.	AFC Belleu (12)	0–2	Septmonts OC (10)
130.	AS Couvron (13)	0–9	US Bruyères-et-Montbérault (9)
131.	US Sissonne (12)	0–1	FC Vierzy (11)
132.	AS Noyers-Saint-Martin (12)	1–3	FC Cauffry (10)
133.	FC Boran (11)	0–4	US Cires-lès-Mello (9)
134.	FC Méaulte (10)	2–4	SC Moreuil (9)
135.	Amiens FC (15)	3–0	US Marcelcave (14)
136.	AS Davenescourt (13)	5–2	Fraternelle Ailly-sur-Noye (11)
137.	ES Licourt (13)	3–0 (Note: US Roisel penalised. Original result was 1–2)	US Roisel (11)
138.	SC Templers Oisemont (11)	1–3	AS St Sauveur (9)
139.	RC Salouël (11)	1–4	JS Miannay Lambercourt (8)
140.	Noyelles-sur-Mer FC (13)	2–5	SC Flixecourt (11)
141.	SC Bernaville-Prouville (14)	1–4	Olympique Eaucourtois (12)
142.	AS Fouilloy (11)	1–2	AAE Chaulnes (9)

=== Lorraine ===
These matches were played between 27 April and 18 June 2016. Note that Tiers refer to the 2015–16 season.

First round results: Lorraine

Tie no	Home team (tier)	Score	Away team (tier)
1.	RS Serémange-Erzange (11)	0–5	AS Portugais St Francois Thionville (9)
2.	ES Vallée Madon (10)	0–5	FC Dombasle-sur-Meurthe (11)
3.	US Cattenom (10)	3–4	US Kœnigsmacker (8)
4.	FC Beausoleil Sarreguemines (13)	2–3	ES Gros Rederching-Bettviller (10)
5.	AS Metz Grange aux Bois (13)	1–8	SC Moulins-lès-Metz (11)
6.	FC Des Ballons (10)	4–2	FC Saulxures-sur-Moselotte-Thiéfosse (12)
7.	CS Thillotin (11)	1–1 (5–4 p)	SO La Bresse (10)
8.	AS Ramonchamp (11)	3–0 (a.e.t.)	FC St Amé Julienrupt (12)
9.	AS St Ruppeen (12)	1–3	FC Ajolais (12)
10.	CA Cornimont (11)	2–0 (a.e.t.) (Note: CA Cornimont merged with SO La Bresse in July. The new club FC Haute Moselotte took the place in Round 2)	FC Granges-sur-Vologne (12)
11.	AS Plombières (10)	6–1	FC Amerey Xertigny (11)
12.	US Lamarche (11)	4–1	RC Saulxures-lès-Bulgnéville (13)
13.	US Val de Saône (11)	5–2	AS Gironcourt (10)
14.	AS St Nabord (11)	1–4	AS Gérardmer (9)
15.	FC Le Tholy (12)	0–5	FC Remiremont (11)
16.	FC St Étienne-lès-Remiremont (11)	4–2	SR Poueux-Jarmenil (11)
17.	ES Ancerville (12)	1–6	FC Haironville (11)
18.	SC Contrisson (11)	4–5	FC Revigny (11)
19.	AS Stenay-Mouzay (10)	5–4 (a.e.t.)	Entente Réhon Villers Morfontaine (10)
20.	AS Darney (12)	0–8	ASC Dompaire (12)
21.	SR Fraize-Plainfaing (11)	2–0	US La Bourgonce (12)
22.	FC Hadol-Dounoux (10)	3–0	Urimenil Uzemain FC (12)
23.	FC Charmois-l'Orgueilleux (12)	2–3 (a.e.t.)	AS Cheniménil (12)
24.	US Anould (11)	0–3	ASC Kellermann (10)
25.	FC Chavelot (12)	2–3	US Arches-Archettes-Raon (9)
26.	FC Fains-Véel (11)	5–0	Brillon AC (12)
27.	IFC Lerrain-Esley (12)	0–4	ES Aviere Darnieulles (10)
28.	AS Val d'Ornain (11)	1–2 (Note: FC Tronville merged during the summer with two other sides to form Entente Centre Ornains The new club took the place in Round 2)	FC Tronville (9)
29.	AS Dommartin La Vraine (120)	0–4	Bulgnéville Contrex Vittel FC (9)
30.	Saulcy FC (11)	0–4	FC Ste Marguerite (10)
31.	US Fave (13)	4–1	FC St Dié (13)
32.	SM Taintrux (11)	5–1	AS Padoux (12)
33.	SM Bruyères (12)	5–1	ES Michelloise (11)
34.	Dogneville FC (11)	2–1	AS Rehaincourt (12)
35.	Gars de l'Ornois Gondrecourt (12)	0–7	FC Neufchâteau-Liffol (9)
36.	US Behonne/Longeville (10)	1–0	FC Vignot (13)
37.	ASL Coussey-Greux (11)	4–1	AS Colombey (13)
38.	AS Velaines (10)	3–2	Lorraine Vaucoulers (11)
39.	AS Tréveray (10)	6–2 (a.e.t.)	AC Rigny-la-Salle (11)
40.	US Mirecourt-Hymont (11)	6–1	LSC Portieux (13)
41.	US Senones (11)	4–0	SM Étival (12)
42.	AS Moyenmoutier-Petite Raon-Moussey (13)	0–3	SC Baccarat (10)
43.	ES Valée de l'Oison (12)	3–0	Association St Laurent Mangiennes (11)
44.	ES Crusnes (11)	0–1	ES Longuyon (10)
45.	FC Pierrefitte-sur-Aire (10)	7–1	FC Belleray (12)
46.	US Thierville (10)	4–1	AS Dieue-Sommedieue (9)
47.	GS Vézelise (11)	2–1	CS Charmes (9)
48.	FC Waldhouse-Walschbronn (12)	1–9	Entente Schorbach Hottviller Volmunster 13(11)
49.	FC Dugny (10)	0–0 (2–4 p)	ES Tilly-Ambly Villers-Bouquemont (11)
50.	AS Rech (11)	3–4	US Schneckenbusch (10)
51.	USL Mont St Martin (11)	2–1	US Lexy (10)
52.	Avenir Longlaville (10)	1–2 (Note: The two teams in the tie, Avenir Longlaville and CS Saulnes, merged in July, forming AS Saulnes Longlaville. The new team progressed to Round 2)	CS Saulnes (9)
53.	RC Pierrepont (11)	3–5	USB Longwy (9)
54.	FC Mexy (11)	1–2 (a.e.t.)	US Russange (12)
55.	ACS Herserange (11)	0–7	CS Godbrange (9)
56.	SC Commercy (10)	9–0	FC Lucey-Boucq-Trondes (13)
57.	ES Maizey-Lacroix (10)	2–1	Entente Sud 54 (12)
58.	ES Badonviller-Celles (12)	1–0	JS Val-et-Châtillon (13)
59.	FJEP Magnières (12)	0–1	AS Rehainviller Hérimenil (10)
60.	Montagnarde Walscheid (11)	2–4	AS Blâmont (10)
61.	ES Bayon-Roville (11)	3–2	ES Charmois Damelevières (12)
62.	FC Cirey-sur-Vezouze (12)	2–3	ES Avricourt Moussey (10)
63.	Olympique Mittelbronn 04 (11)	2–1 (a.e.t.)	Sportive Lorquinoise (10)
64.	ES Rimling-Erching-Obergailbach (12)	2–4	US Soucht (9)
65.	Entente Petit-Rederching/Siersthal (11)	2–1	CS Folsperville (12)
66.	SF Enchenberg (12)	0–6	FC Rohrbach-Bining (10)
67.	CS Wittring (12)	1–5	ES Ormersviller-Epping (10)
68.	SR Langatte (12)	0–0 (4–3 p)	SS Hilbesheim (11)
69.	US Viterne et Madon (10)	3–5	AS Haut-du-Lièvre Nancy (9)
70.	FC Richardménil Flavigny Méréville Messein (9)	9–0	AF Einville (12)
71.	Toul JCA (11)	0–0 (2–4 p)	NG Touloise (13)
72.	AS Dommartin-lès-Toul (11)	2–3	AS Gondreville (10)
73.	Amicale de Chanteheux (11)	3–0	FC Réméréville (12)
74.	ES Lunéville Sixte (10)	5–0	US Rosières-aux-Salines (12)
75.	Stade Flévillois (10)	2–0	AS Varangéville-St Nicolas (9)
76.	US Etain-Buzy (10)	7–0	AS Mars-la Tour (11)
77.	MJC Pichon (10)	3–1	AS Villey-St Étienne (9)
78.	FC Seichamps (11)	0–2	Maxéville FC (9)
79.	SC Malzéville (11)	1–3	AS Lay-St Christophe/Bouxieres-aux-Dames (10)
80.	US Fénétrange-Mittersheim (12)	2–1	GS Nébing (10)
81.	FTM Liverdun (11)	1–8	Olympique Marbache Belleville Dieulouard (12)
82.	FC Sarralbe (11)	2–3 (a.e.t.)	Entente Neufgrange-Siltzheim (10)
83.	FC Houdemont (10)	4–1	FC Dieulouard (13)
84.	US Goetzenbruck-Meisenthal (10)	1–4	AS Le Val-de-Guéblange (11)
85.	FC Dieuze (10)	3–0	Olympique Racrange (11)
86.	US Holving (11)	3–2 (a.e.t.)	US Hilsprich (12)
87.	US Alsting-Zinzing (10)	1–2	FC Verrerie-Sophie (11)
88.	AS Lixing-lès-Rouhling (12)	0–2	US Nousseviller (8)
89.	SS Seingbouse-Henriville (12)	3–1	US Hundling (10)
90.	AS Kerbach (11)	1–2	AC Franco Turc Forbach (12)
91.	CS Diebling (11)	3–2	FC Farschviller (10)
92.	US St Jean-Rohrbach (13)	2–1	FC Diefenbach (12)
93.	AS Grand Couronne (10)	1–2	FC St Max-Essey (9)
94.	AS Hellimer (11)	3–1	ES Lixing-Laning (11)
95.	FC Château-Salins (12)	1–2	FRFJ Lucy (12)
96.	FR Faulx (12)	0–3	EF Delme-Solgne (9)
97.	FC Porcelette (11)	0–5	ES Petite-Rosselle (9)
98.	FC Vahl-Ebersing (11)	2–1	ASJA St Avold (10)
99.	FC Hochwald (10)	1–2	FC Folschviller (9)
100.	FC Carling (10)	1–3	ES Macheren Petit-Eversviller (9)
101.	FC Coume (12)	0–4	JS Wenheck (9)
102.	GS Thiaucourt (11)	3–1	AS Gorze (12)
103.	ES Pont-à-Mousson (11)	0–2	FC Novéant (9)
104.	AS Falck (12)	1–4	ES Créhange-Faulquemont (10)
105.	Flétrange SA (11)	0–4	MJC Volmerange-lès-Boulay (10)
106.	ES Villing (12)	1–5	JS Rémering-lès-Hargarten (11)
107.	AS Schwerdoff (12)	1–5	ESR Rémeling (9)
108.	ES Kirschnaumen Montenach (12)	1–3	JS Rettel-Hunting (11)
109.	US Aumetz (12)	0–3	JS Audunoise (9)
110.	AJSE Montauville (12)	3–1	FC Vandières (13)
111.	JS Ancy-sur-Moselle (11)	5–0	AS Magny (12)
112.	AS Gravelotte (12)	0–8	AS Ars-sur-Moselle (10)
113.	US Jarny (10)	0–3	FC Hayange (8)
114.	ASPF Ste Marie-aux-Chênes (12)	3–6 (a.e.t.)	US Conflans (10)
115.	CS Volmerange-les-Mines (10)	2–1 (a.e.t.)	FC Angevillers (12)
116.	ES Boust-Breistroff (13)	1–5	AS Sœtrich (11)
117.	FC Bure (10)	7–1	AS Œutrange (12)
118.	US Boulange (10)	5–0	JL Knutange (11)
119.	Olympique Moutiers (12)	6–4 (a.e.t.)	AS Tucquegnieux-Trieux (10)
120.	AS Entrange (11)	7–3	RC Nilvange (12)
121.	FC Valleroy-Moinville (11)	2–0	FC Pierrevillers (10)
122.	ASC Basse-Ham (11)	4–1	US Illange (10)
123.	ASC Elzange (11)	1–6	US Yutz (10)
124.	US Briey (9)	0–3	US Fontoy (10)
125.	CEP Kédange-sur-Canner (10)	6–0	JS Manom (12)
126.	SC Terville (10)	4–1	AS Florange-Ebange (11)
127.	AS Neufchef (12)	1–2	US Marspich (10)
128.	TS Bertrange (10)	2–5 (a.e.t.)	FC Guénange (12)
129.	AJ Aubouésienne (12)	12–1	ES Haut Plateau Messin (12)
130.	AS Ay-sur-Moselle (13)	2–1	UL Moyeuvre (10)
131.	ES Richemont (10)	1–9	ES Gandrange (10)
132.	ES Rosselange Vitry (10)	1–5	FC Mondelange (8)
133.	AS Talange (10)	0–1	US Froidcul(9)
134.	US Vigy (11)	1–1 (3–4 p)	ES Maizières (10)
135.	JSO Ennery (10)	0–3	AS Hauconcourt (11)
136.	AS Les Côteaux (11)	1–3 (a.e.t.)	ES Marange-Silvange (9)
137.	ESAP Metz (10)	2–5	AS St Julien-lès-Metz (9)
138.	US Ban-St Martin (10)	2–0	CO Metz Bellecroix (11)
139.	US ACLI Metz (12)	0–3	US Châtel-St Germain (9)
140.	FC Atton (10)	3–7	GS Haroué-Benney (9)
141.	AS Betting-Guenviller (12)	2–1	CS Stiring-Wendel (10)
142.	AS Grostenquin Berig Bistroff (10)	2–3	JS Bischwald (11)
143.	US Rouhling (10)	0–2	US Behren-lès-Forbach (9)
144.	FC Hommert (11)	4–2	FC Troisfontaines (10)
145.	AS Brouviller (11)	1–3	AS Bettborn Hellering (9)
146.	AS Laneuveville Marainviller (10)	2–4	AS Ludres (8)
147.	ES Laneuveville (11)	4–2	Olympique Haussonville (13)
148.	FC Metzing (10)	2–3	US Morsbach (10)
149.	JA Rémilly (10)	0–2	SC Marly (9)
150.	ES Courcelles-sur-Nied (11)	0–2	Fleury FC (12)
151.	US Oudrenne (12)	1–5	AS Volstroff (11)
152.	FC Devant-les-Ponts Metz (9)	3–0	FC Woippy (11)
153.	JS Ars-Laquenexy (10)	3–2	USF Farébersviller (8)
154.	AS Chardons Nanceenes (13)	0–3 (Note: US Jeandelaincourt merged with ES Nomeny in July to form ENJ Val de Seille. The new club take the place in Round 2)	US Jeandelaincourt (11)
155.	FC Istanbul Sarreguemines (10)	1–10	US Spicheren (11)
156.	Olympique de Nancy (10)	0–3	EF Turque Sarrebourg (8)
157.	FC Creutzberg (11)	1–2	FC Freyming (10)
158.	FC Longeville-lès-St Avold (11)	0–5	FC L'Hôpital (8)
159.	FC Verny-Louvigny-Cuvry (10)	0–2	Excelsior Cuvry (11)
160.	AS Algrange (10)	1–1 (1–4 p)	US Volkrange (12)
161.	US Guentrange (11)	3–1	US Ranguevaux (12)
162.	FC Dommartin-lès-Remiremont (12)	0–3	FC Éloyes (9)
163.	ES Schœneck (12)	4–3	SG Marienau (9)
164.	AA Franco Turques Pont-à-Mousson (13)	1–6	Cercle St Jean Augny (10)
165.	ES Woippy (9)	3–0	FC Lorry-Plappeville (13)
166.	LS Vantoux (12)	2–4 (a.e.t.)	RS La Maxe (11)
167.	US Sarres et Donon (12)	2–6	AS Mouterhouse (9)
168.	FC Lemberg-St Louis (11)	2–0	AS Montbronn (8)
169.	AS Neunkirch (11)	1–2	AS Bliesbruck (9)
170.	FC Vœlfling (10)	4–2	CO Bouzonville (11)
171.	US Lineenne (9)	9–0	ES Lérouville (11)
172.	AS Anzeling-Edling (10)	6–1	JS Distroff (11)
173.	FC Écrouves (10)	0–2	FC Toul (8)
174.	AS Kalhausen (11)	0–9	AS Réding (9)
175.	ASC Saulxures-lès-Nancy (10)	1–0	AF Laxou Sapinière (9)
176.	Achen-Etting-Schmittviller (10)	3–1	FC Hambach (12)

=== Bourgogne ===
These matches were played between 4 June and 26 June 2016. Note that Tiers refer to the 2015–16 season.

First round results: Bourgogne

Tie no	Home team (tier)	Score	Away team (tier)
1.	Grury Issy Foot (11)	2–0	US Luzy-Millay (10)
2.	IS Bresse Nord (11)	3–0	CLL Échenon (11)
3.	US Blanzy (9)	2–1	FC Joncy (10)
4.	AJ Sautourienne (10)	3–4	ASUC Migennes (8)
5.	SC Gron (9)	4–3	ES Appoigny (9)
6.	AJ Villeneuvienne (12)	2–1 (a.e.t.)	AS Villeneuve-l'Archevêque (12)
7.	AS Champlost (11)	3–5	CSP Charmoy (9)
8.	FC St Julien-du-Sault (10)	2–5	Amicale Franco-Portugais Sens (10)
9.	FC Rosoy (11)	4–5 (a.e.t.)	ESIV St Sérotin (11)
10.	Union Châtillonniase Colombine (9)	5–3	AS Tonnerroise (9)
11.	AFM Avallaon (12)	1–2	Montbard Venarey (8)
12.	US Guillon (12)	0–1	US Varennes (8)
13.	SC Vitteaux (11)	2–0	ES Val d'Ource (11)
14.	AJ Salives Léry Minot (12)	0–3	FC Chassignelles Lezinnes (10)
15.	FC Aignay Baigneux (10)	0–2	AS Chablis (9)
16.	FJEP Saints (12)	0–9	FC Chevannes (10)
17.	CS Corbigeois (9)	2–1	Avallon FC (9)
18.	Corvol FC (12)	0–3	AS Gurgy (11)
19.	US Sauvigny-les-Bois (10)	0–2	Dornes Neuville Olympique (9)
20.	AS St Péreuse (12)	0–8	ES Lucenay/Cossay (10)
21.	AS Guerigny Urzy Chaulgnes (10)	1–1 (3–4 p)	JS Marzy (8)
22.	FC Dompierre-Matour (12)	0–2	FC Clessé (12)
23.	US Varenne-St Yan (11)	0–2	FC Hurigny (8)
24.	US St Martin-Senozan (11)	3–0	CS Tramayes (12)
25.	JS Mâconnaise (8)	1–2	Sud Foot 71 (8)
26.	RC Flacé Mâcon (12)	0–4	JS Crechoise (8)
27.	Dun Sornin (9)	3–4	Digoin FCA (8)
28.	AS Digoin Céramistes (11)	1–5	SC Mâcon (11)
29.	SR Clayettois (9)	1–0	AS Neuvyssois (10)
30.	FC La Roche-Vineuse (10)	4–2	CO Chauffailles (9)
31.	FC Bois du Verne (9)	2–2 (3–1 p)	AS St Vincent-Bragny (9)
32.	US Bourbon-Lancy FPT (8)	2–1	JS Montchanin ODRA (8)
33.	St Vallier Sport (11)	1–0	CS Sanvignes (8)
34.	Montcenis FC (10)	1–3	JF Palingeois (8)
35.	US Rigny-sur-Arroux (9)	6–0	AS Chassy-Marly-Oudry (10)
36.	CS Orion (12)	1–3	AS Perrecy-les-Forges (10)
37.	AS Ciry-le-Noble (10)	4–7	JO Le Creusot (8)
38.	US Gilly-sur-Loire (11)	2–3	ES Pouilloux (10)
39.	AS Tournus (11)	3–2	ASL Lux (9)
40.	CS Varennois (12)	8–1	JS Abergement-Ste Colombe (11)
41.	AFC Cuiseaux-Champagnat (11)	3–0	IS St Usuge (12)
42.	AS St Albain (12)	1–3	US Sennecey-le-Grand et Son Canton (9)
43.	SC Châteaurenaud (12)	4–3 (a.e.t.)	US Revermontaise (12)
44.	ES St Germain-du-Plaine-Baudrières (11)	2–3	US Cuisery (11)
45.	FC Épervans (9)	3–1	US Lessard-en-Bresse (10)
46.	US Saillenard (12)	4–3 (a.e.t.)	JS Ouroux-sur-Saône (10)
47.	US Buxynoise (11)	5–4 (a.e.t.)	AS Varennes-le-Grand (9)
48.	FC Abergement-de-Cuisery (9)	2–1	AS Sagy (9)
49.	ASJ Torcéenne (12)	0–1	FC Chassagne-Montrachet (10)
50.	FLL Gergy-Verjux (9)	1–0	FC St Rémy (10)
51.	JS Rully (8)	7–1	AS St Léger (9)
52.	Champforgeuil FC (12)	1–2	ESA Breuil (8)
53.	AS Mellecey-Mercurey (10)	0–2	Chalon ACF (8)
54.	FC Marmagne (11)	2–5	SC Etangois (9)
55.	FC Autun (10)	2–2 (3–5 p)	US Crissotine (8)
56.	AS Canton du Bligny-sur-Ouche (11)	1–1 (5–4 p)	ASFR Thury (11)
57.	AS Lacanche (11)	5–2	AS Cheminots Chagnotins (10)
58.	US St Germain-du-Bois (11)	2–4	FC Sassenay-Virey-Lessard-Fragnes (10)
59.	FCLA Champdotre-Longeault (11)	0–1	CS Mervans (9)
60.	US Brazey (10)	4–3	FC Corgoloin-Ladoix (9)
61.	AS Genlis (8)	4–0	AS St Usage St Jean-de-Losne (9)
62.	JS Bey (12)	1–2	US San-Martinoise (12)
63.	FC Verdunois (11)	4–7 (a.e.t.)	FC Aiserey-Izeure (9)
64.	AS Til-Châtel (11)	0–3	ASFC Daix (10)
65.	CL Marsannay-la-Côte (8)	3–0	EF Villages (9)
66.	FC Sombernon (11)	3–4	FC Talant (10)
67.	FC Ouges-Fenay (11)	0–1	UL Française Européenne Dijon (9)
68.	FC Saulon-Corcelles (10)	3–2 (a.e.t.)	ES Fauverney-Rouvres-Bretenière (8)
69.	Tilles FC (10)	0–3	FC Remilly-sur-Tille (11)
70.	AS Gevrey-Chambertin (11)	0–3	ASC Plombières-Lès-Dijon (8)
71.	UFC de l'Ouche (12)	2–1	Dinamo Dijon (11)
72.	CSL Chenôve (9)	3–2	US Marey-Cussey (10)
73.	ASA Vauzelles (8)	3–0	US Coulanges-lès-Nevers (9)
74.	Cosnois FC (11)	6–5 (a.e.t.)	Monéteau FC (8)
75.	UF La Machine (8)	0–1	AS St Benin (8)
76.	FREP Luthenay (10)	3–0	ASC Pougues (8)
77.	CS Bazois (10)	2–6	AS Fourchambault (8)
78.	ES du Pays Charollais (10)	1–7	US Cluny (8)
79.	RC Guerreaux-La Motte (10)	0–1	Union Franco-Cambodigienne Torcy (11)
80.	EFC Demigny (11)	2–4	AS Igornay (10)
81.	Val de Norge FC (8)	3–1	AS Pouilly (8)
82.	SC Malay-le-Grand (11)	0–7	US Cerisiers (8)
83.	RC Entrains (10)	1–2	St Fargeau SF (10)
84.	Persévérante Pontoise (12)	0–5	AS Véron (9)
85.	ES Vinneuf-Courlon (10)	2–4	RC Sens (9)
86.	Eveil Sénonais (12)	1–4	FC Gatinais en Bourgogne (8)
87.	AS Magny (10)	2–1	US Semur en Epoisses (8)
88.	US Canton Charny (11)	2–1	ES Charbuy (11)
89.	CA St Georges (11)	4–2	US Toucycoise (8)
90.	Montillot FC (11)	3–0	FC Coulanges-la-Vineuse (9)

=== Alsace ===
These matches were played between 11 and 17 August 2016.

First round results: Alsace

Tie no	Home team (tier)	Score	Away team (tier)
1.	US Dachstein (11)	2–1	FC Grendelbruch (12)
2.	AS Cleebourg Bremmelbach (13)	0–8	AS Hunspach (8)
3.	FC Ebersmunster (15)	2–1	US Sundhouse (12)
4.	US Scherwiller (9)	1–0	AS Sermersheim (9)
5.	ASCCO Helfrantzkirch (11)	3–0	AS Bourgfelden St Louis (10)
6.	FC Oermingen (13)	5–0	ASC Brotsch (12)
7.	US Oberbruck Dolleren (9)	2–2 (3–4 p)	AS Lutterbach (10)
8.	Olympique Zinswiller (13)	1–2	FC Langensoultzbach (13)
9.	US Gumbrechtshoffen (10)	1–6	FC Eschbach (9)
10.	AS Durlinsdorf (11)	1–3	SC Ottmarsheim (9)
11.	FC Excelsior Kaltenhouse (10)	0–3	AS Hoerdt (8)
12.	ASL Hegeney (12)	0–7	US Mietesheim (12)
13.	AS Niedernai (12)	1–2	CS Ste Croix-aux-Mines (12)
14.	FC Alteckendorf (11)	1–0	US Deimeringen-Vœllerdingen (9)
15.	AS Altorf (12)	0–2	FC Montagne Verte Strasbourg (9)
16.	FC Artolsheim (11)	1–6	FC Sélestat (9)
17.	FC Avolsheim (13)	0–3	FC Dahlenheim (10)
18.	FC Balbronn (13)	0–3	SR Furdenheim (8)
19.	US Baldenheim (9)	5–0	ES Stotzheim (10)
20.	ASLC Berstett (13)	4–3	SOAS Strasbourg Robertsau (13)
21.	AS Betschdorf (9)	2–1	SC Rœschwoog (10)
22.	FC Bindernheim (11)	1–3	AS Westhouse (10)
23.	ASC Blaesheim (13)	3–0	FA Bruche Barembach (13)
24.	FC Boofzheim (11)	2–4	FC Ostwald (10)
25.	US Bouxwiller (11)	0–2	FC Phalsbourg (10)
26.	AS Wisches Russ (11)	0–2	FC Breuschwickersheim (10)
27.	SS Brumath (12)	0–3	FC Wingersheim (10)
28.	US Dalhunden (12)	4–2	FC Bischwiller (12)
29.	US Dambach-la-Ville (12)	3–2	CS St Etienne Wolxheim (12)
30.	FC Dambach Neunhoffen (13)	2–1	FCE Reichshoffen (13)
31.	FC Dangolsheim (12)	2–3	AS Willgottheim (11)
32.	FC Dauendorf (12)	1–3	FC Weitbruch (10)
33.	SC Dettwiller (12)	7–0	FC Weislingen (12)
34.	SR Dorlisheim (11)	1–6	EB Achenheim (9)
35.	ASL Duntzenheim (10)	2–2 (2–4 p)	CS Strasbourg Neuhof (9)
36.	USL Duppigheim (10)	0–1	ALFC Duttlenheim (8)
37.	FC Eckbolsheim (8)	1–2 (a.e.t.)	LS Molsheim (8)
38.	UJSF Epsig (12)	0–4	US Hangenbieten (11)
39.	SC Ergersheim (13)	1–2 (a.e.t.)	AS Holtzheim (9)
40.	FC Ernolsheim-lès-Saverne (12)	3–1	AS Wingen-sur-Moder (10)
41.	CS Fegersheim (9)	4–0	FC Eschau (9)
42.	AS Gambsheim (9)	2–1	FC Ecrivains-Schiltigheim-Bischheim (10)
43.	AS Gerstheim (10)	4–2	CS Hautepierre Strasbourg (11)
44.	FC Geudertheim (10)	3–3 (4–2 p)	AS Reichstett (11)
45.	FC Haslach (13)	1–3	CS Bernardswiller (13)
46.	AS Hatten (11)	0–2	SC Roppenheim (9)
47.	FC Herbitzheim (13)	0–7	FC Dossenheim-sur-Zinsel (11)
48.	FC Herbsheim (11)	2–1	AS Schœnau (12)
49.	FC Hessenheim (13)	1–12	AS Chatenois (11)
50.	FC Hilsenheim (13)	3–1	AS Marckolsheim (12)
51.	AC Hinterfeld (12)	2–0	FC Oberhoffen (11)
52.	SR Hoenheim (8)	1–1 (4–3 p)	FC Herrlisheim (9)
53.	FC Hoffen (12)	3–1	FC Altenstadt (10)
54.	US Innenheim (10)	2–2 (5–6 p)	FC Rhinau (11)
55.	FC Kindwiller (11)	0–1	US Turcs Bischwiller (8)
56.	AS Laubach (13)	0–3	FC Durrenbach (10)
57.	AS Lembach (12)	2–4	AS Forstfeld (12)
58.	AS St Barthelemy Leutenheim (12)	1–2	SS Beinheim (11)
59.	FC Lingolsheim (10)	0–7	US Nordhouse (10)
60.	OC Lipsheim (11)	2–1	FC Valff (12)
61.	FC Lixhausen (13)	5–1	CSIE Harskirchen (11)
62.	FC Marmoutier (11)	3–1	FC Monswiller (11)
63.	AS Mertzwiller (11)	4–0	SC Rittershoffen (11)
64.	ES Morsbronn-les-Bains (13)	1–0	FC Gries (13)
65.	FC Mulhausen (13)	0–3	US Trois Maisons (10)
66.	AS Mundolsheim (10)	2–0	AS Kilstett (9)
67.	AS Musau Strasbourg (13)	6–0	ASC Portugais Bruche (12)
68.	AS Natzwiller (12)	2–2 (5–4 p)	FC Krautergersheim (11)
69.	FC Niederrœdern (13)	0–5	FC Riedseltz (10)
70.	FC Niederschaeffolsheim (12)	0–2	FCO Strasbourg Koenigshoffen 06 (8)
71.	ES Offendorf (13)	1–5	US Preuschdorf (9)
72.	AS Offwiller (12)	0–3	FC Niederlauterbach (11)
73.	AS Osthouse (13)	3–2	CA Plobsheim (12)
74.	AS Pfulgriesheim (11)	2–4	US Eckwersheim (11)
75.	FC Quatzenheim (12)	3–4	AS Nordheim-Kuttolsheim (12)
76.	FC Rohrwiller (12)	2–3	US Mommenheim (12)
77.	ES Romanswiller (11)	2–1 (a.e.t.)	Strasboutg UC (12)
78.	SR Rountzenheim-Auenheim (11)	2–1	US Niederbronn-les-Bains (11)
79.	AS St Etienne Salmbach (12)	0–3	FC Steinseltz (8)
80.	AS Sarrewerden (13)	1–4	AS Weinbourg (13)
81.	FC Schaffhouse-sur-Zorn (11)	8–0	FC Schwindratzheim (11)
82.	FC Scheibenhard (12)	3–8	AS Lauterbourg (10)
83.	AS Schœnenbourg (10)	6–5 (a.e.t.)	US Schleithal (10)
84.	FC Schweighouse (10)	0–2	AS Uhrwiller (12)
85.	AS Seebach (11)	1–2	FC Mothern (11)
86.	AS Portugais Sélestat (10)	4–3	SC Ebersheim (9)
87.	FR Sessenheim-Stattmatten (10)	0–4	FC Drusenheim (9)
88.	FC Souffelweyersheim (8)	1–1 (4–1 p)	Olympique Strasbourg (8)
89.	FC Soufflenheim (11)	1–5 (a.e.t.)	AS Educative Cité de l'Ill (9)
90.	FC Steinbourg (12)	0–2	US Wimmenau (11)
91.	AS Électricité Strasbourg (11)	2–1	RC Kintzheim (10)
92.	AS Strasbourg (9)	2–0	FC Niederhausbergen (11)
93.	AS Neudorf (9)	0–7	AS Menora Strasbourg (8)
94.	FC Egalité Strasbourg (13)	1–8	AS Mussig (10)
95.	SC Gaz de Strasbourg (13)	1–0	FC Sand (13)
96.	FC Stockfeld Colombes (12)	3–0	US Huttenheim (12)
97.	FC Truchtersheim (10)	6–2	FC Marlenheim-Kirchheim (11)
98.	SC Urmatt (13)	0–3	ASB Schirmeck-La Broque (11)
99.	FA Val de Moder (11)	6–2	AS Espagnols Schiltigheim (12)
100.	CS Waldhambach (11)	5–9	AS Lupstein (10)
101.	FC Wangen-Westhoffen (13)	2–0	AS Hohengoeft (13)
102.	AS Weyer (10)	1–2	FC Keskastel (10)
103.	FC Wissembourg (12)	1–3	FC Oberroedern (9)
104.	FC Wittisheim (11)	1–6	FC Entzheim (10)
105.	AS Wœrth (13)	1–2 (a.e.t.)	Fatih-Sport Haguenau (10)
106.	ES Wolfisheim (13)	0–8	FC Oberhausbergen (11)
107.	AS Andolsheim (11)	2–4	SR Kaysersberg (9)
108.	US Artzenheim (12)	2–3 (a.e.t.)	AS St Hippolyte (11)
109.	FC Aspach-le-Bas (12)	0–3	FC Reguisheim (10)
110.	AS Aspach-le-Haut (10)	3–0 (a.e.t.)	FC Baldersheim (9)
111.	FC Bisel (11)	0–5	FC Bantzenheim (9)
112.	AS Blodelsheim (12)	0–3	RC Mulhouse (9)
113.	AS Brechaumont (12)	0–7	AS Burnhaupt-le-Bas (10)
114.	Buhl (12)	1–3	US Pulversheim FC (10)
115.	St Georges Carspach (12)	0–7	FC Seppois (10)
116.	US Colmar (9)	2–1	AS Guémar (10)
117.	SS Espagnols Colmar (12)	1–4	SR Widensolen (12)
118.	Olympique Colmar (11)	1–4	FC Wintzfelden-Osenbach (9)
119.	FCA Portugais Colmar (12)	2–5	AS Pfaffenheim (10)
120.	FC Colmar Unifié (11)	2–4	AS Canton Vert (11)
121.	RC Dannemarie (11)	2–6	FC Kappelen (10)
122.	AS Didenheim (11)	0–4	US Thann (9)
123.	AS Durmenach (12)	0–7	FC Rosenau (11)
124.	FC Ensisheim (12)	7–1	FCRS Richwiller (11)
125.	FC Bollwiller (12)	2–1	Mitzach Foot 77 (12)
126.	FC Folgensbourg (11)	3–4	US Azzurri Mulhouse (9)
127.	FC Grussenheim (10)	0–2	FC Fessenheim (9)
128.	AS Guewenheim (11)	1–3	FC Morschwiller-le-Bas (9)
129.	FC Gundolsheim (10)	2–4	US Gunsbach-Zimmerbach (10)
130.	FC Habsheim (9)	3–2	FC Blue Star Reiningue (10)
131.	AS Herrlisheim (10)	0–3	FC Wolfgantzen (12)
132.	AS Rixheim Île Napoléon (11)	0–3	FC Sentheim (9)
133.	FC Heiteren (10)	3–2 (a.e.t.)	FC Ingersheim (9)
134.	FC Masevaux (12)	0–2	FC Anatolie Mulhouse (10)
135.	AS Mertzen (9)	3–1	US Hésingue (10)
136.	FC Meyenheim (10)	2–3	FC Battenheim (11)
137.	Amical Antillais Mulhouse (12)	2–3	AS Schlierbach (10)
138.	AS Red Star Mulhouse (10)	3–2	FC Brunstatt (9)
139.	Étoile Mulhouse (12)	0–1	Montreux Sports (10)
140.	FC Lusitanos Mulhouse (12)	4–0	FC Roderen (10)
141.	FC Niederhergheim (9)	3–0	AS Turckheim (10)
142.	AS Niffer (11)	0–1	AS Rixheim (9)
143.	AS Ober-Niederentzen (11)	3–1	AS Vallée Noble (11)
144.	FC Obermorschwiller (10)	0–0 (3–0 p)	SS Zillisheim (9)
145.	FC Oltingue (11)	0–3	US Hirsingue (9)
146.	US Pfetterhouse (12)	1–1 (4–3 p)	FC Muespach (10)
147.	FCI Riquewihr (10)	3–1	FC Oberhergeim (10)
148.	FC Rouffach (12)	3–1	SR Bergheim (10)
149.	ALSC Rumersheim (12)	2–3	ASPTT Mulhouse (11)
150.	AS Sigolsheim (11)	2–3	FC Feldkirch (10)
151.	FC Soultz (11)	1–1 (4–3 p)	FC Lauw (12)
152.	FC Ste Croix-en-Plaine (9)	3–2	AS Mahorais Colmar (11)
153.	FC Tagsdorf (10)	4–2	AS Hochstatt (9)
154.	FC Traubach (11)	3–1	AS Wittersdorf (12)
155.	FC Ungersheim (10)	0–1	FR Jebsheim-Muntzenheim (12)
156.	AS Raedersdorf (9)	1–0	FC Village Neuf (11)
157.	AS Waldighoffen (11)	1–4	AS Hagenbach-Buethwiller (10)
158.	FC Walheim (12)	1–4	AS Hausgauen (10)
159.	FC Wettolsheim (10)	2–6	FC Merxheim (9)
160.	ES Wihr-au-Val (11)	0–4	FC Horbourg-Wihr (9)
161.	FC Willer-sur-Thur (9)	0–1	FC Steinbrunn-le-Bas (10)
162.	AS Wintzenheim (12)	0–5	AS Ribeauville (9)
163.	US Zimmersheim-Eschentzwiller (11)	0–1	FC Sausheim (9)
164.	US Wittersheim (11)	2–0	SC Red Star Strasbourg (12)
165.	FC Lampertheim (9)	1–0	La Wantzenau FC (10)
166.	FC Neewiller (13)	2–0	Entente Drachenbronn-Birlenbach (12)
167.	FC Barr (11)	0–16	US Oberschaeffolsheim (9)
168.	US Imbsheim (12)	0–2	AS Ingwiller (9)
169.	FC Kogenheim (11)	2–4	US Hindisheim (9)
170.	ASPTT Strasbourg (12)	1–7	CS Mars Bischheim (8)
171.	SR Zellwiller (12)	3–1	FC Rosheim (11)
172.	AS Hattstatt (12)	0–5	AS Munster (10)
173.	AS Elsenheim (12)	0–3	AS Hohwarth-St Pierre-Bois (9)
174.	AS Heiligenstein (11)	1–2	FC Boersch (11)
175.	FC Matzenheim (12)	2–3	FC Kertzfeld (13)
176.	FC Deportivo Strasbourg (13)	0–3	AP Joie et Santé Strasbourg (9)
177.	US Ettendorf (11)	4–0	AS Schillersdorf (13)
178.	FC Waldolwisheim (13)	0–1	FC Mackwiller (13)
179.	AS Weiterswiller (13)	1–5	AS Hochfelden (9)

=== Auvergne ===
These matches were played on 20 and 21 August 2016.

First round results: Auvergne

Tie no	Home team (tier)	Score	Away team (tier)
1.	AS Ferrières-sur-Sichon (10)	3–0	AS St Prix (9)
2.	AS Varennes-sur-Allier (10)	0–5	AS Cheminots St Germain (10)
3.	AS St Just (11)	1–2	AS Yolet (10)
4.	FC Issoire 2 (12)	5–3 (a.e.t.)	AS Royat (10)
5.	FC Nord Combraille (9)	4–1	SC Billom (11)
6.	AS St Ours (10)	6–4	CO Veyre-Monton (9)
7.	ASPTT Moulins (11)	2–4	AS Le Breuil (10)
8.	Ballon Beaulonnais (10)	2–5	AS Tronget (9)
9.	US St Victor (9)	1–2	FC Bézenet (9)
10.	Médiéval Club Montluçonnais (11)	5–0	FC Hauterive (11)
11.	CS Vaux-Estivareilles (11)	1–0	US Hyds (10)
12.	AS Billezois (10)	2–2 (4–2 p)	SC Avermes (10)
13.	US Vendat (10)	0–1	FC Souvigny (10)
14.	ES Diou (10)	0–10	SC St Pourcain (10)
15.	JS Neuvy (10)	4–2	ES Vernetoise (11)
16.	Vigilante Garnat St Martin (10)	0–2	FC Billy-Crechy (8)
17.	US Malicorne (11)	2–1	US Trezelles (10)
18.	AS Montvicq (12)	1–4	AS Neuilly-le-Réal (10)
19.	AS Villebret (11)	4–4 (2–4 p)	Etoile Moulins Yzeure (9)
20.	Montagne Bourbonnaise FC (11)	0–9	AS Moulins (7)
21.	US Bien-Assis Montluçon (10)	0–3	US Toque Huriel (10)
22.	FC Chappelle Molles (11)	3–3 (3–4 p)	AS Mercy-Chapeau (10)
23.	US Ébreuil (11)	0–3	US Lignerolles-Lavault Ste Anne (9)
24.	AL Quinssaines (9)	2–4	AS Dompierroise (8)
25.	ES St Plaisir (12)	1–8	US Vallon (9)
26.	US Meaulnoise Urcay (10)	0–10	SCA Cussét (8)
27.	FC Couleuvre (11)	3–1	AS St Angel (11)
28.	CS Targetois (11)	0–3	US Doyet (9)
29.	Jaligny Vaumas Foot (10)	1–3	AS Lurcy-Lévis (10)
30.	AS Nord Vignoble (8)	0–3	AA Lapalisse (7)
31.	AS Châtel-de-Neuvre (11)	9–0	AS Chassenard Luneau (10)
32.	US Abrest (10)	4–2	SC Ygrandais (10)
33.	COA Commentry (12)	0–5	Bellerive-Brugheas Foot (10)
34.	AS Trévoloise (9)	3–0	AS Marcillat (10)
35.	CS Villefranche (10)	2–4	CS Bessay (9)
36.	AS Rongeres (11)	0–3	USP Commentryenne (9)
37.	US Biachette Désertines (9)	4–1	AS Gennetinoise (9)
38.	US Seuillet St Gérand (10)	3–8	AS Louchy (9)
39.	CS Cosne D'Allier (9)	4–0	Espoir Molinetois (9)
40.	OC Montenay-sur-Allier (12)	0–1	AS Cérilly (9)
41.	Bourbon Sportif (9)	14–1	AS Néris (10)
42.	CS Thiel-sur-Acolin (11)	3–3 (4–3 p)	AS Salignoise (11)
43.	AS Toulonnaise (9)	1–2	SC Gannet (9)
44.	Stade St Yorre (9)	1–2	AC Creuzier-le-Vieux (8)
45.	FC Coltines (11)	3–0	FC Moussages (9)
46.	ES Vitrac-Marcoles (12)	0–5	FC Massiac-Molompize-Blesle (8)
47.	FC Albepierre-Bredons (12)	2–3	ES St Mamet (9)
48.	Carladez Goul Sportif (9)	0–2	CS Arpajonnais (7)
49.	US Aspre Maronne (9)	1–2 (a.e.t.)	FC Artense (8)
50.	AS Pléaux-Rilhac-Barriac (11)	3–0	US Siranaise (10)
51.	AS Ayrens/St Illide (9)	0–1	AS Sansacoise (8)
52.	FC Junhac-Montsalvy (9)	0–1	ES Pierrefortaise (8)
53.	US Crandelles (8)	2–1	US Murat (7)
54.	Cère FC Vic/Polminhac (9)	0–1	FC Ally Mauriac (8)
55.	US Haut-Célé (11)	3–0	US La Garde Loubaresse (11)
56.	AS Doire-Bertrande (9)	0–2	Sporting Chataigneraie Cantal (7)
57.	AS Naucelles	0–3	Sud Cantal Foot (8)
58.	AS Aurillac (10)	0–5	ES Riomois-Condat (8)
59.	FC Minier (11)	2–4	US La Chapelle-Laurent (11)
60.	FC Hauts de Cère (13)	0–0 (4–3 p)	CS Vézac (12)
61.	US Besse (11)	1–0	Saignes FC (11)
62.	US Cère et Landes (10)	0–2	AS Espinat (9)
63.	US Chaussenac (13)	2–3	Jordanne FC (11)
64.	ES Vebret-Ydes (12)	3–2	AS Chaudes-Aigues (11)
65.	St Jeures SJ (13)	0–3	AS St Pierre-Eynac (10)
66.	AS Loudes (9)	3–1	CO Craponne (10)
67.	AS Laussonne (10)	2–3	Sauveteurs Brivois (11)
68.	Aiguilhe FC (12)	1–4	AS Emblavez-Vorey (8)
69.	AS Montfaucon (12)	3–3 (6–7 p)	AS Cheminots Langeac (8)
70.	FC St Germain Laprade (9)	0–3	US Arsac-en-Velay (9)
71.	ES Lempdaise (13)	0–3	Montregard JL Raucoules (10)
72.	FC Aurec (9)	4–2	AS Beaulieu (9)
73.	US Bains-St Christophe (10)	2–2 (4–3 p)	Retournac Sportif (9)
74.	CO Coubon (10)	0–13	Olympic St Julien-Chapteuil (8)
75.	FC Vézézoux (10)	1–0	Seauve Sport (10)
76.	AG Sigolenoise (11)	3–2	US Landos (10)
77.	FC Dunières (10)	2–1	US Bassoise (8)
78.	FC Tence (12)	1–4	Ass. Vergongheon-Arvant (7)
79.	AS St Didier-St Just (9)	4–0	US Brioude (11)
80.	AS Grazac-Lapte (8)	3–1	SC Langogne (11)
81.	US Fontannes (9)	3–2	US Sucs et Lignon (8)
82.	US Mozac (9)	2–1	AS Enval-Marsat (8)
83.	US Lapeyrouse (10)	5–0	FC Sayat-Argnat (9)
84.	FC Mezel (10)	0–3	US Ennezat (9)
85.	AS Charensat (11)	2–0	FC Charbonnières-les-Vieilles
86.	ES Saint-Maurice-ès-Allier (11)	4–4 (5–4 p)	FC Plauzat-Champeiz (11)
87.	Dômes-Sancy Foot (9)	1–1 (4–2 p)	La Combelle CAB (11)
88.	AS Haute Dordogne (10)	0–8	US Issoire (11)
89.	FC Olby-Ceyssat-Mazayes (10)	0–12	JS St Priest-des-Champs (11)
90.	AL Glaine-Montaigut (11)	2–1	US Ménétrol (10)
91.	Durolle Foot (9)	0–0 (3–4 p)	US Gerzat (10)
92.	US Orcet (10)	2–3	Pérignat FC (7)
93.	AS Moissat (10)	3–2	US Courpière (9)
94.	FC Aubierois (10)	0–2	US Vic-le-Comte (8)
95.	CS St Bonnet-près-Riom (10)	0–4	US St Beauzire (7)
96.	AGuiRA FC (11)	2–1	US Gervaisienne (9)
97.	FC Vertaizon (9)	0–0 (4–3 p)	AS St Genès-Champanelle (11)
98.	ES Volcans Mauzat (11)	2–3	FC Blanzat (9)
99.	Clermont Métropole FC (10)	5–1	AS Cellule (10)
100.	Ecureuils Franc Rosier (9)	3–6	AS Romagnat (11)
101.	US Chapdes-Beaufort (11)	0–3	CSA Brassacois Florinois (9)
102.	ES St Rémy-sur-Durolle (11)	1–2	EFC St Amant-Tallende (8)
103.	ES St Germinoise (10)	3–2	CS Pont-du-Château (7)
104.	FF Chappes (10)	4–1	CS Pont-de-Dore (11)
105.	ES Couze Pavin (12)	1–14	Ambert FCUS (7)
106.	CS Puy-Guillaume (10)	0–3	US Les Martres-de-Veyre (8)
107.	US Messeix Bourg-Lastic (11)	3–4	ALS Besse Egliseneuve (9)
108.	AS Cunlhat (12)	0–3	US Val de Couze Chambon (10)
109.	US Menat (10)	1–3	Aulnat Sportif (9)
110.	RC Charbonnières-les-Varennes (10)	2–1	ASC Ouvoimoja (10)
111.	AI St Babel (9)	1–2	FA Le Cendre (8)
112.	AS Livradois Sud (9)	3–2	Cébazat Sports (8)
113.	FC Mirefleurs (11)	1–3	Espérance Ceyratois Football (8)
114.	US Limons (10)	1–8	FC Châtel-Guyon (8)
115.	AS Orcines (10)	2–1	US Maringues (8)
116.	US Les Martres-d'Artière (10)	2–1	FC Lezoux (9)

=== Lower Normandy ===
These matches were played on 20 and 21 August 2016.

First round results: Lower Normandy

Tie no	Home team (tier)	Score	Away team (tier)
1.	SM Haytillon (9)	0–2	FC Équeurdreville-Hainneville (8)
2.	AS Boucé (11)	0–3	Jeunesse Fertoise Bagnoles (8)
3.	FC Pays Aiglon (8)	2–3	AS Berd'huis Foot (9)
4.	CS Barfleur (11)	0–1	US La Glacerie (9)
5.	ES Plain (10)	1–2	CS Carentan (8)
6.	PL Octeville (10)	1–6	US Ouest Cotentin (8)
7.	AS Ste Marie-du-Mont (11)	1–7	Ass. St Martin Hardinvast-Tollevast-Couville (9)
8.	FC Digosville (11)	1–9	UC Bricquebec (8)
9.	AS Pointe Cotentin (10)	3–5	AS Brix (9)
10.	ASS Urville-Nacqueville (10)	1–7	US Côte-des-Isles (8)
11.	Elan Tocqueville (10)	1–0 (a.e.t.)	AS Valognes (9)
12.	FC Val de Saire (10)	2–1	AS Querqueville (9)
13.	AC Sideville-Virandeville-Teurthéville-Hague (10)	0–1	ES Quettetot-Rauville (10)
14.	ES Gouville-sur-Mer (11)	2–3	La Bréhalaise FC (8)
15.	RS St Sauver-le-Vicomte (11)	1–2	Périers SF (9)
16.	Créances SF (10)	0–3 (Note: Créances SF penalised for fielding a suspended player. Original scoreline 2–1)	FC Agon-Coutainville (8)
17.	US Lessay (12)	0–2	CA Pontois (9)
18.	FC de l'Elle (11)	0–7	FC 3 Rivières (9)
19.	ES Munevillaise (12)	1–2	US Ste Croix St Lô (9)
20.	ES des Marais (11)	1–0	US Semilly St André (9)
21.	Entente Le Lorey-Hautville-Feugères (11)	1–4	USM Donville (9)
22.	ES Marigny-Lozon-Mesnil-Vigot (10)	1–0	US Roncey-Cerisy (9)
23.	ES St Sauveur-La Ronde-Haye (10)	0–1	Condé Sports (8)
24.	ES Pirou (10)	0–4	ES Hébécrevon (9)
25.	FC des Etangs (9)	3–1	Tessy-Moyon Sports (9)
26.	ES Isigny-le-Buat (11)	0–3	Patriote St Jamaise (9)
27.	FC Le-Val-St Père (11)	0–8	US St Quentin-sur-le-Homme (8)
28.	ES Trelly-Quettreville-Contrières (11)	0–5	US St Pairaise (8)
29.	US St Martin-des-Champs (10)	0–3	CS Villedieu (8)
30.	AS Folligny (12)	0–9	Espérance St Jean-des-Champs (8)
31.	US Pontorson (12)	2–5 (a.e.t.)	ES Terregate-Beuvron-Juilley (10)
32.	ES Marcilly-St Ovin (12)	0–2	St Hilaire-Virey-Landelles (10)
33.	AS Cerencaise (12)	2–0	FC Sienne (11)
34.	US Mortainaise (10)	0–0 (3–1 p)	USCO Sourdeval (9)
35.	US Percy (10)	1–2	AS Vaudry-Truttemer (11)
36.	ES Tirepied (11)	1–9	AS Jullouville-Sartilly (10)
37.	AS Sacey-Tanis (12)	1–1 (2–4 p)	Espérance St Jean-de-la-Haize (10)
38.	US Frênes-Montsecret (11)	2–3	AS Cahagnes (9)
39.	US Flerienne (11)	0–0 (4–3 p)	Cingal FC (10)
40.	Avenir Messei (9)	7–1	AS Suisse Normande (10)
41.	Leopards St Georges (8)	2–3	US Aunay-sur-Odon (9)
42.	JS Tinchebray (10)	2–1	AFC St Denis-de-Méré (11)
43.	US Putanges (11)	0–3	Avenir St Germain-du-Corbéis (9)
44.	AS Sarceaux Espoir (9)	3–4	AS Courteille Alençon (9)
45.	SS St Georges-Domfront (8)	13–0	Stade Alençon (10)
46.	AM La Ferrière-aux-Etangs (10)	2–3 (a.e.t.)	Amicale Chailloué (10)
47.	AS Passais-St Fraimbault (10)	2–1	ES Forges-Radon-Vingt-Hanaps (10)
48.	AS Villeneuve Alençon (12)	0–3	US Andaine (9)
49.	US Ménil-de-Briouze (11)	0–1	Sées FC (9)
50.	Espérance Condé-sur-Sarthe (9)	5–0	CO Ceaucé (9)
51.	US Mortagnaise (8)	5–3	Vimoutiers FC (9)
52.	US Randonnai (11)	3–2	US Le Theil (11)
53.	ES Cetonnais (10)	4–6	Etoile du Perche (9)
54.	Espérance St Symphorien-des Bruyères (10)	1–2	CS Orbecquois-Vespièrois (8)
55.	ESI May-sur-Orne (9)	0–3	ESFC Falaise (8)
56.	USI La Graverie (12)	0–6	AS La Selle-la-Forge (9)
57.	Inter Odon FC (8)	1–0	US Athis (9)
58.	AS Potigny-Villers-Canivet-Ussy (8)	2–0	ES Thury-Harcourt (9)
59.	ESM Condé (11)	0–3	US Villers-Bocage (8)
60.	SL Pétruvien (9)	5–2	FC Landais (9)
61.	ES Livarotaise (9)	3–0	ES Pays d'Ouche (9)
62.	AS St Cyr-Fervaques (9)	1–0	AS Gacé (8)
63.	US Petruvienne (10)	0–4	CA Lisieux (8)
64.	ES Courtonnaise (11)	4–3 (a.e.t.)	Soligny-Aspres-Moulins (10)
65.	Stade St Sauverais (9)	1–1 (2–4 p)	US Pont-l'Évêque (8)
66.	AS Ouilly-le-Vicomte (11)	0–6	AJS Ouistreham (8)
67.	ES Bonnebosq (12)	1–3	US Cresserons-Plumetot (10)
68.	AS Giberville (12)	4–1	ES Grenthevillaise (11)
69.	ES Cormelles (11)	0–3	FC Argences (10)
70.	AS Démouville (10)	1–3	USC Mézidon (8)
71.	MSL Garcelles-Secqueville (11)	0–1	FC Lisieux (9)
72.	CL Colombellois (13)	2–1	AS Villers-Blonville-Benerville (11)
73.	ES Escoville-Hérouvillette (11)	0–3	AS Moult-Bellengreville (10)
74.	AS Biéville-Beuville (11)	5–0	AS St Désir (10)
75.	FC Baie de l'Orne (11)	0–1	ES Troarn (9)
76.	Dozulé FC (9)	1–1 (2–3 p)	US Houlgate (9)
77.	FC Langrune-Luc (9)	3–3 (3–5 p)	AS Verson (8)
78.	FC Basly (12)	0–3	Hermanville-Lion FC(9)
79.	JS Audrieu (11)	1–2	US Bretteville-l'Orgueilleuse (10)
80.	ASL Chenin Vert (11)	1–2	Lystrienne Sportive (9)
81.	Cambes-en-Plaine Sports (9)	0–3	AS St Vigor-le-Grand (8)
82.	FC Caen Sud Ouest (12)	0–1	JS Colleville (10)
83.	US Thaon-Le Fresne-Vallée de la Mue (9)	2–1	US Guérinière (8)
84.	ES Tronquay (11)	1–6	Bourguébus-Soliers FC (8)
85.	USM Blainvillaise (10)	2–1	US Cheux-St Manvieu-Norrey (10)
86.	US Authie (13)	2–1	Ass. Caen Sud (11)
87.	JS Fleury-sur-Orne (10)	1–1 (4–5 p)	US Maisons (10)
88.	FC Hastings Rots (12)	1–8	ES Portaise (11)
89.	US Tilly-sur-Seulles (11)	0–5	USI Bessin Nord (9)
90.	AJ St Hilaire-Petitville (10)	0–5	ES Carpiquet (8)

=== Bretagne ===
These matches were played on 19, 21 and 24 August 2016.

First round results: Bretagne

Tie no	Home team (tier)	Score	Away team (tier)
1.	AS St Herve de Caro (12)	5–2	Chevaliers St Guyomard (13)
2.	FC Lié (11)	2–0	AFC La Marmoye-St Martin-des-Prés (13)
3.	US Méné Bré (13)	3–2	UO Trégor (11)
4.	Stade Kénanais (13)	3–1	ES Rudonou (12)
5.	JS Langoat (13)	0–3	JA Penvénan (11)
6.	FC Trélévern-Trévou (12)	1–4	AS Pleubian-Pleumeur (10)
7.	FC Lizildry (13)	0–6	US Pays Rochois (12)
8.	US Trieux-Lézardrieux-Pleudaniel (12)	0–3	ES Ploubazlanec (10)
9.	AS Trédrez-Locquémeau (12)	5–2 (a.e.t.)	AS Ploumilliau (11)
10.	Méné Bré Sports Pédernec (13)	1–3 (a.e.t.)	US Trémel (11)
11.	KC Tonquédec (12)	1–5	US Ploubezre (10)
12.	US Pluzunet-Tonquédec (12)	1–0	US Prat (11)
13.	US Kerity (12)	2–5	Entente du Trieux FC (11)
14.	CS Plouhatin (13)	0–3	US Goudelin (11)
15.	AS La Plestinaise (13)	0–3	FC Trébeurden-Pleumeur-Bodou (10)
16.	CS Rospez (12)	2–0	Union Squiffiec Trégonneau (12)
17.	Goëlands de Plouézec (12)	1–3	Écureuils de Plourivo (11)
18.	Pléhédel Sports (13)	0–2 (a.e.t.)	ES Pommerit-Le Merzer (11)
19.	AS Plélo (12)	1–4	US Plouisy (10)
20.	Trieux FC (12)	1–5	RC Ploumagoar (10)
21.	US Maël-Carhaix (12)	0–1	US St Nicolas-du-Pélem (11)
22.	US Glomel (12)	1–2	US Plouguernével (11)
23.	AS Kérien-Magoar (12)	3–0	Plounévez-Lanrivain-Trémargat US (11)
24.	FC Le Vieux Bourg (13)	2–4 (a.e.t.)	FC La Croix-Corlay (12)
25.	US Briacine (12)	2–3 (a.e.t.)	US Callac (11)
26.	AS Pyramide Lanfains (13)	1–3	Étoile du Leff (12)
27.	US Argoat (12)	1–3	ES Le Fœil (12)
28.	AS Trévé Sports (12)	1–1 (2–3 p)	AS Blavet (12)
29.	US St Caradec (12)	1–3	FC Poulancre-Múr-St Gilles (11)
30.	FC St Bugan (12)	0–2	AS Motterieux (11)
31.	Goëlo FC (11)	1–2	Pordic-Binic FC (10)
32.	US St Donan (13)	3–1	AS St Herve (11)
33.	Étoile Sud Armor Porhoët (11)	3–1	AS La Prenessaye (12)
34.	AS St Barnabé (12)	2–1	Laurmené FC (11)
35.	Vigilante Plémet (12)	0–3	CS Merdrignac (10)
36.	St Jacut Sports (13)	0–3	AS Trébry (11)
37.	US Plessala (10)	3–2	ALSL Plémy (11)
38.	La Plœucoise Foot (12)	7–1	FC Moncontour-Trédaniel (11)
39.	AL Carreucoise (12)	0–5	Évron FC (10)
40.	US Hénon (12)	0–1	AS Trégueux (11)
41.	UF Yffiniac (12)	4–5	CS Croix Lambert (11)
42.	CS Illifaut (13)	0–5	US Trémorel (11)
43.	CS Lanrelas (11)	4–2	ES Meu (12)
44.	AS Plaine-Haute (13)	0–9	St Brandan-Quintin FC (11)
45.	US Mené Le Gouray (13)	1–2	AS Broons-Trémeur (11)
46.	JS Landéhen (11)	0–2	ES Penguily (10)
47.	US Plouasne-St Juvat (11)	2–0	US Plumaugat (12)
48.	ES Hénansel-St Denoual-La Bouillie Emeraude (11)	1–4	Coëtmieux Pommeret FC (10)
49.	ES St Cast-le-Guildo (12)	5–0	US Ruca (13)
50.	Val d'Arguenon Créhen-Pluduno (12)	3–2	FC Rance-Frémur (11)
51.	ALSS Trélat Taden (13)	0–8	Stade Évrannais (11)
52.	US Lanvallay (11)	0–2	FC Pays de Plélan Vildé (10)
53.	AS Bobital (11)	4–2 (a.e.t.)	FC Trévron (12)
54.	US Brusvily (11)	1–0	AS Plumaudan (12)
55.	FC Côte de Penthièvre (12)	3–3 (5–6 p)	Entente des Lacs FC (12)
56.	PL Bergot (11)	0–4	Gars de St Yves (9)
57.	Arzelliz Ploudalmézeau (11)	0–2	Étoile St Laurent (9)
58.	AS Dirinon (11)	0–1	FC Le Relecq-Kerhuon (9)
59.	La Guerlesquinaise (12)	2–3	JU Plougonven (9)
60.	Stade Léonard Kreisker (11)	4–1	Guiclan FC (9)
61.	ES Berrien-Huelgoat (12)	1–4	AS Scrignac (10)
62.	ES Carantec-Henvic (11)	3–2	US Taulé (10)
63.	US Plouigneau (12)	1–4	US Lanmeur-Plouégat-Guérand (10)
64.	AS Santec (11)	4–3 (a.e.t.)	US Cléder (10)
65.	St Pierre Plouescat (11)	1–2	FC Lanhouarneau-Plounévez-Lochrist (10)
66.	AS Kersaint (12)	0–2	St Divy Sports (10)
67.	Gâs de Plouider (12)	0–7	CND Le Folgoët (10)
68.	SC Lanrivoaré (11)	0–1	AS Plouvien (10)
69.	Brest Beneton Club (11)	0–8	SC Lannilis (10)
70.	Étoile St Arzel (11)	1–3	ASPTT Brest (10)
71.	Gars St Majan (12)	1–5	Légion St Pierre (10)
72.	ES Locmaria-Plouzané (11)	2–6	ES Portsall Kersaint (10)
73.	ES Guissény (12)	1–6	AS Landeda (10)
74.	Étoile Trégoroise Plougasnou (12)	1–3	US Morlaix (11)
75.	FC Plouezoc'h (12)	1–2	Avenir Plourin (11)
76.	US Pont-Meur Guimiliau (13)	0–4	Gars de la Rive (12)
77.	FC Ste Sève (13)	1–2	ES Pleyber-Christ (12)
78.	Olympique Sibiril (12)	3–5 (a.e.t.)	Paotred Rosko (11)
79.	Cadets de Plougoulm (12)	0–6	ES Lampaulaise (11)
80.	AS St Vougay (12)	2–0	Gars de Ploúenan (11)
81.	EF Plougourvest (12)	2–2 (3–4 p)	AS Berven-Plouzévédé (11)
82.	US St Servais-St Derrien (12)	2–7	AS Sizun-Le Tréhou (11)
83.	ES Cranou (12)	5–2	US Pencran (11)
84.	US Rochoise (12)	0–4	FA de la Rade (11)
85.	FC Côte des Légendes (12)	0–2	Étoile St Edern (11)
86.	ES Mignonne (12)	0–3	AL Coataudon (11)
87.	JS St Thonanaise (12)	8–2	Cavale Blanche (11)
88.	US Aber-Benoît Tréglonou (12)	1–2	AS Guilers (11)
89.	AJA Brélès-Lanildut (13)	0–3	US Plougonvelin (11)
90.	AS Ploumoguer (12)	1–3	Avel Vor St Pabu (12)
91.	Hermine Kernilis (12)	3–0	Stade Landernéen Kergrèis (12)
92.	JG Forestoise (12)	1–3 (a.e.t.)	ES Plounéventer (12)
93.	US Crozon-Morgat (11)	1–0	Lopérec Sport (12)
94.	AS Telgruc-sur-Mer (11)	3–0	FC Douarnenez (12)
95.	AS Dinéault (13)	1–4	Lanvéoc Sports (11)
96.	St Nic Sports (12)	1–3	AS Camaretoise (11)
97.	US Quéménéven (12)	0–3	Paotred Briec (11)
98.	ES Gouézec (13)	2–3	Racing Cast-Porzay (12)
99.	AS Pont-de-Buis (12)	2–2 (2–4 p)	Stade Pleybennois (11)
100.	Tricolores Landrévarzec (12)	3–0	Edern Sports (11)
101.	US Brasparts-Loqueffret (13)	0–4	Gars de Plonévez-du-Faou (12)
102.	US Poullaouen (11)	1–1 (3–1 p)	Toros Plounévézel (10)
103.	AS Motreff (13)	3–4 (a.e.t.)	US Châteauneuf-du-Faou (11)
104.	US Landeleau (12)	0–2	PB Spézet (10)
105.	US St Hernin (13)	1–6	US Kergloff (12)
106.	US Cléhen-Poher (12)	1–1 (5–4 p)	AC Carhaix (11)
107.	AS Laz (13)	2–2 (3–4 p)	St Goazec (12)
108.	US Lennon (13)	1–0	St Thois Sports (12)
109.	AS Gâs de Leuhan (12)	0–4	Glaziks de Coray (10)
110.	Zèbres de Trégourez (12)	0–2	ES Langolen (12)
111.	ES Beuzec (12)	7–0	Goulien Sports (13)
112.	Gas d'Ys Tréboul (11)	3–0	FC Goyen (12)
113.	FC Penn-ar-Bed (12)	3–1 (a.e.t.)	ES Landudec-Guiler (11)
114.	ES Plogonnec (11)	2–0	AS Gars de Poullan (12)
115.	ES Plonéis (13)	3–4	ES Malahon-Confort (12)
116.	AS Diables du Juch (12)	0–4	Gourlizon Sport (11)
117.	JS Plogastel (11)	10–0	Lapins de Guengat (12)
118.	ES Riec (12)	2–2 (6–7 p)	Fleur de Genêt Bannalec (11)
119.	AS Tréméven (11)	1–2	ES Rédené (12)
120.	Locunolé Sports (12)	0–3	Stade Mellacois (11)
121.	AS Kernével (13)	2–3	US Querrien (12)
122.	Coquelicots du Trévoux (12)	0–4	AS Baye (11)
123.	ES Névez (12)	4–2	FC Rosporden (11)
124.	Hermine Concarnoise (11)	6–1	AS St Yvi (12)
125.	Mélénicks Elliant (11)	2–3	Amicale Ergué-Gabéric (10)
126.	CA Forestois (13)	2–2 (8–9 p)	US Île-Tudy (12)
127.	FC Pleuvennois (11)	5–0	Combrit Ste Marine FC (12)
128.	La Raquette Tréméoc (12)	3–4 (a.e.t.)	Espoir Clohars-Fouesnant (11)
129.	US St Évarzec (11)	3–2 (a.e.t.)	US Portugais Quimper (12)
130.	Quimper Ergué-Armel FC (11)	2–4	FC Turc Quimper (12)
131.	US Pluguffan (11)	3–0	ES St Jean-Trolimon (12)
132.	FC Bigouden (12)	1–9	FC Treffiagat-Guilvinec (11)
133.	JS Peumerit 2005 (13)	0–5	Marcassins Sportif Tréogat (12)
134.	AS Loctudy (13)	0–3	Gars de Plomeur (11)
135.	Breizh Fobal Klub (13)	0–3	Cercle Paul Bert Gayeulles (11)
136.	US St Armel (13)	0–3	US Pont-Péan (11)
137.	RC Rennes	0–3	US Val d'Izé (10)
138.	Châteaubourg-St Melanie FA (12)	1–6	US Noyal-Chatillon (10)
139.	AS St Jacques (11)	3–0	AC Rennes (12)
140.	FC Mosaïque (12)	2–3	US Acigné (10)
141.	US Bais (13)	0–3	US Vern-sur-Seiche (11)
142.	Olympic Montreuil-Landavran (12)	0–3	Châteaubourg FC (13)
143.	Avenir Domalain (12)	0–5	JA Balazé (10)
144.	US Dourdain (12)	1–2	US Domagné-St Didier (11)
145.	US Erbrée-Mondevert (12)	1–3	Haute Vilaine FC (11)
146.	AS Étrelles (12)	1–2	Bleuets Le Pertre-Brielles-Gennes-St Cyr (11)
147.	ES St Aubin-des Landes/EF Cornillé (12)	2–3	US Châteaugiron (10)
148.	ES Taillis-St Christophe-des Bois (12)	0–3	ES Thorigné-Fouillard (10)
149.	Torcé-Vergéal FC (12)	0–2	US Janzé (10)
150.	FC Sougéal (13)	1–1 (3–5 p)	FC La Mézière-Melesse (11)
151.	AS St Coulomb (13)	1–3	US Baguer-Morvan (11)
152.	US St Guinoux (13)	1–10	AS Miniac-Morvan (11)
153.	FC Antrain-St Ouen (13)	0–3	AS Ercé-près-Liffré (11)
154.	JS Picanaise (12)	3–1 (a.e.t.)	Pleurtuit Côte d'Emeraude (11)
155.	AS La Gouesnière (12)	1–3	Cercle Jules Ferry (10)
156.	CS La Richardais (12)	0–3	La Cancalaise (11)
157.	FC Marcillé-Bazouges-St Remy-Noyal (12)	1–4	Indépendante St Georges-de-Chesné (10)
158.	AS Montreuil-le-Gast (12)	0–0 (1–3 p)	FC Meillac-Lanhélin-Bonnemain (11)
159.	FC Plerguer/Roz-Landrieux (12)	2–1 (a.e.t.)	JA St Servan (11)
160.	FC Bord de Rance (12)	3–0	AS St Pierraise Épiniac (11)
161.	La Mélorienne (12)	6–0	FC Baie Mont St Michel (11)
162.	Omnisport Suliaçais (12)	0–3	US Château-Malo (10)
163.	FC Tinténiac-St Domineuc (12)	3–1	Cercle Paul Bert Nord Ouest (11)
164.	AS Tremblay-Chauvigné (12)	1–6	FC Louvigné-La Bazouge (11)
165.	US Le Ferré (13)	2–4	US Gosné (11)
166.	Fougères FC (14)	1–8	La Chapelle-Fleurigné-Laignelet-Le Loroux (11)
167.	Entente Sens-Vieux-Vy Gahard (14)	1–6	FC Aubinois (11)
168.	AC Couesnon (14)	0–12	Entente Parigné/Landéan (11)
169.	Association Châtillon-en-Vendelais-Princé (12)	2–3	Stade St Aubinais (10)
170.	Espérance La Bouëxière (12)	1–5	US Billé-Javené (11)
171.	FC Sud Fougerais (12)	1–2	ASE Lécousse (10)
172.	US Sens-de-Bretagne (12)	1–3	FC Stéphanais Briçois (10)
173.	FC Des Landes (12)	0–0 (5–4 p)	US St Marc/St Ouen (11)
174.	US Illet Forêt (12)	0–2	US Gévezé (10)
175.	US Le Crouais (13)	2–3	US Bédée-Pleumeleuc (11)
176.	AS Parthenay-de-Bretagne (13)	1–0	JA Bréal (11)
177.	AS St Thurial (13)	0–6	Avenir Irodouër (11)
178.	US Bécherel/Minias-sous-Bécherel (12)	0–6	US St Gilles (11)
179.	Montfort-Iffendic (12)	3–1	US Gaël Muel (10)
180.	FC Pays d'Anast (12)	1–3	Hermitage AC (10)
181.	SEP Quédillac (12)	0–1	Eskouadenn de Brocéliande (10)
182.	AS Romille (12)	1–5	USC Chavagne (11)
183.	US Chapelloise (13)	0–11	US Mordelles (10)
184.	Ossé/St Aubin (12)	0–0 (2–3 p)	OC Brétillien (13)
185.	US Ste Marie (13)	1–6	Espérance Sixt-sur-Aff (11)
186.	SC Goven (12)	1–10	US Bourgbarré (11)
187.	US Bosseloise (12)	0–3	SC St Senoux (11)
188.	US Bel Air (10)	5–0	US Orgères (12)
189.	JA Pipriac (12)	0–4	US Guignen (11)
190.	ES Boistrudan-Piré (12)	0–1	US Bain-de-Bretagne (10)
191.	Hermine de Renac (12)	1–2	FC Baulon-Lassy (11)
192.	ASC St Erblon (12)	0–2	US Laillé (10)
193.	Reveil Seglinois (12)	1–0	Avenir Lieuron (10)
194.	Avenir Guiscriff (11)	6–2	FC Meslan (12)
195.	FC Kerchopine (11)	4–1	FL Inguiniel (12)
196.	AS Gestel (11)	3–0	AS Guermeur (12)
197.	CS Quéven (10)	5–0	Stiren Cléguer FC (10)
198.	AS Calanaise (12)	3–2	AS Lanvaudan (13)
199.	AS Penquesten (12)	1–6	AS Bubry (11)
200.	Garde de Voeu Hennebont (12)	1–4 (a.e.t.)	FC Kerzec (11)
201.	VFL Keryado (11)	0–3	ES Merlevenez (10)
202.	Garde du Gohazé St Thuriau (12)	2–2 (5–6 p)	US Langoelan (13)
203.	Melrand Sports (12)	2–0	ES Le Croisty-St Caradec (13)
204.	ACS Bieuzy-les-Eaux (11)	0–4	FC Klegereg (10)
205.	Garde St Eloi Kerfourn (11)	2–0	Ajoncs d'Or Malguénac (12)
206.	FC Gueltas-St Gérand-St Gonnery (11)	3–2	US Rohannaise (12)
207.	JA Arzano (11)	2–1	La Guideloise (10)
208.	La Patriote Malansac (11)	4–0	FC St Perreux (12)
209.	St Clair Réguiny (11)	0–1	FC Naizin (10)
210.	SC Sournais (12)	3–4	CS Pluméliau (10)
211.	Vigilante Radenac(12)	0–2	Espérance Bréhan (11)
212.	Enfants de St Gildas (11)	4–2	AS Croix-Helléan (12)
213.	St Jean Sport (11)	6–1	Volontaire d'Augan (12)
214.	Garde de l'Yvel Loyat (11)	1–5	Bleuets Néant-sur-Yvel (12)
215.	Ecureils Roc-St André (11)	1–2	US St Abraham Chapelle-Caro (10)
216.	La Sérentaise (11)	0–1	Avenir St Servant-sur-Oust (10)
217.	Espoir de l'Oust Les Fougerêts (11)	1–2	CS St Gaudence Allaire (12)
218.	Étoile de l'Oust St Congard-St Laurent (11)	2–3	FC Cournon (12)
219.	JA Peillac (12)	0–5	Enfants de Guer (10)
220.	Espoir St Jacut-les-Pins (11)	1–0	ES St Jean-la-Poterie (12)
221.	Étoile St Martin (12)	0–1	Brocéliande Campénéac (11)
222.	AS de la Claie (12)	0–3	Ruffiac-Malestroit (10)
223.	Gentienne Pluherlin (11)	6–3 (a.e.t.)	Avenir St Vincent-sur-Oust (12)
224.	US St Melanie Rieux (11)	0–1	Fondelienne Carentoir (12)
225.	US Le Cours (11)	2–3	St Sébastien Caden (10)
226.	Montagnards Sulniac (11)	3–1	AS St Eloi La Vraie-Croix (10)
227.	Damgan-Ambon Sport (11)	0–1	FC Basse Vilaine (10)
228.	AS Berrich-Lauzach (12)	0–2	JF Noyal-Muzillac (11)
229.	ES Larré-Mollac (12)	1–8	Armoricaine Péaule (10)
230.	La Locminoise (13)	0–3	Bleuets Crédin (12)
231.	EFC St Jean Brévelay (11)	7–1	AS Brévelaise (12)
232.	AS Moustoir-Ac (11)	5–0	Paotred Tarun (12)
233.	Garde du Loch (12)	2–2 (4–3 p)	Semeurs de Grand-Champ (10)
234.	Guénin Sport (11)	2–1	St Efflam Kervignac (10)
235.	ACS Outre Mer (12)	3–1 (a.e.t.)	Cercle St Martin Trédion (13)
236.	ES Mériadac (12)	0–1	CS Pluneret (11)
237.	AS Plougoumelen-Bono (11)	7–0	US Ploeren (12)
238.	ASC Ste Anne-d'Auray (12)	0–1 (a.e.t.)	Avenir Plumergat (13)
239.	US Brech (11)	1–3	Landaul Sports (10)
240.	AGG Locmariaquer (12)	6–3	AS Belle-Île-en-Mer (11)
241.	Hermine Locoal-Mendon (11)	0–3	ES Ploemel (10)
242.	US Nostang (11)	0–6	Riantec OC (10)
243.	ES Trinitaine (12)	0–2	Garde du Pont Marzan (10)
244.	Indépendante Mauronnaise (10)	5–0	St Pierre Pleugriffet (11)
245.	Fleur d'Ajonc Inzinzac (11)	11–0	Avenir Ste Hélène (12)
246.	US Lanvénégen (13)	2–8	AS Priziac (12)
247.	Avenir du Pays Pourleth (12)	0–2	Stade Guémenois (12)
248.	US Berné (12)	2–6	US Le Faouët (11)
249.	AG Arzal (12)	2–0	Sarzeau FC (12)
250.	Hermine Ménéac (13)	0–7	CS Josselin (12)
251.	JA Pleucadeuc (12)	3–1	Aurore de Taupont (11)
252.	Glaneurs de Lizio (13)	0–1	Garde de la Mi-Voie (12)
253.	Mélécienne de Plumelec (13)	0–2	Ajoncs d'Or St Nolff (12)
254.	Avenir Buléon-Lantillac (13)	0–5	Cadets de Guéhenno (12)
255.	Garde St Arnould St Allouestre (13)	1–3	Rah-Koëd Plaudren FC (12)
256.	US St Armel-Le Hézo (12)	1–4	US Arradon (10)
257.	Prat Poulfanc Sport-Vannes Sété (12)	1–6	AS Meucon (11)
258.	AS Monterblanc (11)	3–1 (a.e.t.)	ES Plescop (10)
259.	ES Remungol (13)	0–3	AL Camors (12)
260.	ES Colpo (12)	1–2	Plumelin Sports (10)
261.	AS Kergonan (12)	1–0	Garde Ste Anne Branderion (13)
262.	Erdeven-Étel (12)	4–1	Plouhinec FC (11)
263.	ES Crac'h (11)	5–1	AS Pluvignoise (10)
264.	Lanester FC (13)	0–3	Stade Gâvrais (12)
265.	Entente St Gilloise (12)	1–5	Languidic FC (10)
266.	Stade Landévantais (12)	0–1	US Hennebont (12)
267.	FC Quistinic (12)	3–0	Carnac FC (13)
268.	Kerlaz Sport (12)	1–7	Gas du Menez-Hom (11)

=== Centre-Val de Loire ===
These matches were played on 20 and 21 August 2016.

First round results: Centre-Val de Loire

Tie no	Home team (tier)	Score	Away team (tier)
1.	CA St Laurent-Nouan (10)	0–1	US Beaugency Val-de-Loire (7)
2.	US Selles-sur-Cher (8)	0–1	FC Ouest Tournageau (6)
3.	US Turcs Chalette (11)	0–3	SMOC St Jean-de-Braye (7)
4.	FC Villiers-sur-Loir (10)	0–4	CS Lusitanos Beaugency (8)
5.	Avenir St Amand-Longpré (10)	2–5	Etoile Brou (9)
6.	US Vendôme (8)	5–1	FC Rémois (9)
7.	FC Dry (12)	2–5	FC St Georges-sur-Eure (7)
8.	US St Martin-des-Bois (12)	0–7	US Selommes (9)
9.	FC Perche Senonchoise (10)	2–2 (5–4 p)	FC Magdunois (8)
10.	AS Suèvres (11)	0–1	CEP La Ferté-Vidame (10)
11.	OC Châteaudun (8)	1–2	US Châteauneuf-sur-Loire (6)
12.	AG Chécy-Mardié-Bou (11)	2–1	US Valée du Loire (10)
13.	FC Boigny-sur-Bionne (9)	1–1 (8–9 p)	Dammarie Foot Bois-Gueslin (8)
14.	Stade Loupéen (9)	3–6 (a.e.t.)	US Mer (8)
15.	CS Angerville-Pussay (10)	3–0	US Beaune-la-Rolande (9)
16.	USS Portugais Orléans (11)	0–1	ES Maintenon-Pierres (9)
17.	US La Chapelle-St Mesmin (10)	4–0	ES Nogent-le-Roi (8)
18.	Avenir Ymonville (9)	3–2	CS Mainvilliers (7)
19.	SC Malesherbes (9)	2–0	FC Mandorais (10)
20.	ES Nancray-Chambon-Nibelle (9)	2–3	Amicale de Lucé (7)
21.	ES Jouy-St Prest (10)	3–3 (4–1 p)	Amicale Sours (8)
22.	Neuville Sports (10)	1–2	Amicale Épernon (8)
23.	AS Tout Horizon Dreux (9)	0–4	CA Pithiviers (7)
24.	ES Marigny 45 (10)	3–0	Etoile Marsauceux (11)
25.	CAN Portugais Chartres (9)	2–0	Luisant AC (9)
26.	AS Anet (11)	0–3	ACSF Dreux (8)
27.	FJ Champhol (10)	1–6	ES Chaingy-St Ay (11)
28.	AS Corbeilles (11)	0–6	FCM Ingré (8)
29.	FCO Saint-Jean-de-la-Ruelle (10)	4–1	AS Châteauneuf-en-Thymerais (8)
30.	CD Espagnol Oréans (10)	0–2	ES Gâtinaise (7)
31.	Amicale Gallardon (8)	0–3	USM Montargis (6)
32.	US Ousson-sur-Loire (9)	6–1	US St Cyr-en-Val (10)
33.	SC Massay (9)	1–2 (a.e.t.)	FC St Jean-le-Blanc (7)
34.	FC Coullons-Cerdon (10)	5–4 (a.e.t.)	ES Moulon Bourges (8)
35.	Diables Rouges Selles-St Denis (9)	0–2	ES Marmagne-Berry-Bouy (10)
36.	US La-Ferté-St Aubin (9)	1–0	Olympique Mehunois (9)
37.	CS Vignoux-sur-Barangeon (9)	5–2	Fraternelle Nogentaise (10)
38.	SL Chaillot Vierzon (10)	3–0 (Note: AS St Germain-du-Puy penalised, Original scoreline 3–5)	AS St Germain-du-Puy (9)
39.	RC Bouzy-Les-Bordes (10)	3–0	Jargeau-St Denis FC (11)
40.	US Briare (11)	1–3	FC Vasselay-St Éloy-de-Gy (10)
41.	Gazelec Bourges (8)	0–4	J3S Amilly (7)
42.	FC Fussy-St Martin-Vigneux (10)	0–2	ESCALE Orléans (8)
43.	Olympique Portugais Mehun-sur-Yèvre (10)	5–2	St Denis-en-Val FC (11)
44.	Santranges FC (10)	2–4 (a.e.t.)	US Dampierre-en-Burly (10)
45.	Stade Savigny-en-Sancerre (10)	0–4	CSM Sully-sur-Loire (7)
46.	AS Nouan-Lamotte (10)	0–6	USM Olivet (7)
47.	US Le Pêchereau (11)	0–4	US Aigurande (10)
48.	ECF Bouzanne Vallée Noire (11)	4–4 (5–3 p)	AS St Gaultier-Thenay (10)
49.	FC Le Châtelet-Culan (11)	1–3	Black Roosters FC (12)
50.	SC Châteauneuf-sur-Cher (9)	2–5	US Argenton-sur-Creuse (8)
51.	SS Cluis (12)	0–9	US Châteaumeillant (9)
52.	ES St Plantaire-Cuzion-Orsennes (11)	1–4	AS Chapelloise (9)
53.	US Dun-sur-Auron (10)	0–1	ES Sancoins (11)
54.	ES Trouy (9)	2–1	FR Velles (10)
55.	US St Florent-sur-Cher (10)	3–4 (a.e.t.)	FC Diors (8)
56.	Avenir Lignières (10)	2–1	US La Châtre (9)
57.	AC Parnac Val d'Abloux (8)	1–3	AS Portugais Bourges (7)
58.	AS Arthon (10)	1–2	AS Orval (8)
59.	FUS St Benoît-du-Sault (10)	2–7	FC St Doulchard (8)
60.	FC Bas Berry (12)	2–5	US Montgivray (9)
61.	ES Vallée Verte (9)	1–2	SA Issoudun (7)
62.	Etoile Châteauroux (10)	1–6	AJS Mont Bracieux (8)
63.	US St Romanaise (11)	0–2	Joué-lès-Tours FC Touraine (9)
64.	SC Vatan(9)	3–1	ES Villefranche-sur-Cher (10)
65.	US Le Poinçonnet (9)	2–5	FC Azay-sur-Cher (10)
66.	AC Villers-les-Ormes (10)	0–3	AS Montlouis-sur-Loire (7)
67.	AS Contres (8)	3–1	FC Bléré Val de Cher (9)
68.	US Portugaise Joué-lès-Tours (11)	1–3	Vineuil SF (6)
69.	Vernou-Neung-Courmemin Foot (9)	0–3	US Chambray-lès-Tours (7)
70.	CA Montrichard (9)	8–0	ES Poulaines (9)
71.	US Billy (9)	7–4	US Reuilly (10)
72.	AS Esvres (10)	2–0	US St Maur (8)
73.	EGC Touvent Châteauroux (9)	3–4 (a.e.t.)	US Saint-Pierre-des-Corps (7)
74.	RC Val Sud Touraine (11)	1–5	SC Azay-Cheillé (7)
75.	ES Bridoré-Verneuil (13)	1–3	US Argy (12)
76.	ES St Benoît-la-Forêt (11)	6–0	AS Ingrandes (11)
77.	AS Vallée du Lys (10)	1–8	St Georges Descartes (8)
78.	US Le Blanc (9)	3–1	FC St Maure-Maillé (10)
79.	Langeais Cinq-Mars Foot (9)	1–1 (4–2 p)	Loches AC (10)
80.	ES Bourgueil (10)	1–3	FC Richelieu (8)
81.	JL Val-de-Creuse (11)	1–10	AS Monts (8)
82.	SLO Mazières-de-Touraine (12)	0–2	JAS Moulins-sur-Céphons (11)
83.	Espérance Hippolytaine (11)	2–0	ACS Buzançais (9)
84.	FC Levroux (9)	3–3 (4–5 p)	US Villedieu-sur-Indre (8)
85.	FC Martizay-Mézières-Tournon (9)	3–8	FC Déolois (7)
86.	ASL Orchaise (11)	0–2	Racing La Riche-Tours (8)
87.	CCSP Tours (9)	0–2	ES La Ville-aux-Dames (8)
88.	USC Châtres-Langon-Mennetou (10)	0–1	ES Oésienne (8)
89.	Avionnette Parçay-Meslay FC (10)	0–3	US Renaudine (9)
90.	ES Villebarou (11)	1–5	CS La Membrolle-sur-Choisille (11)
91.	AS Nazelles-Négron (11)	1–5	JS Cormeray (11)
92.	ASC Rapid Club Blois (11)	0–3	Étoile Bleue St Cyr-sur-Loire (6)
93.	ASJ La Chaussée-St-Victor (9)	3–0	AS Fondettes (10)
94.	US Monnaie (10)	1–3	AS Chouzy-Onzain (8)
95.	AS Villedômer (10)	2–4 (a.e.t.)	US Chitenay-Cellettes (8)
96.	AS Rochecorbon (11)	1–3	ASC Portugais Blois (8)
97.	AC Amboise (9)	2–4	AFC Blois (8)
98.	US Brenne Vendœuvres (12)	2–11	AS St Amandoise (6)

=== Centre-West ===
These matches were played on 20 and 21 August 2016.

First round results: Centre-West

Tie no	Home team (tier)	Score	Away team (tier)
1.	US Envigne (11)	0–7	ES Aubinrorthais (10)
2.	ES Oyré-Dangé (9)	0–3	CO Cerizay (8)
3.	FC Airvo St Jouin (11)	0–1	ES Beaumont-St Cyr (8)
4.	US Courlay (10)	8–1	US Vouillé (11)
5.	US Anais (12)	1–5	ACG Foot Sud 86 (11)
6.	JS Basseau Angoulême (11)	2–2 (3–1 p)	US Vivonne (11)
7.	US Châteauneuf 16 (11)	1–4	CS Bussac-Forêt (11)
8.	AS Chazelles (11)	0–3	FC St Brice-sur-Vienne (9)
9.	AJ Montmoreau (12)	1–2	US Marennaise (9)
10.	FC Rouillac (12)	0–5	AS Montguyon (10)
11.	FC Roullet-St Estèphe (11)	3–0	USA St Aigulin (11)
12.	UAS Verdille (11)	4–2	CDJ Pompaire (11)
13.	Aviron Boutonnais (10)	4–0	FC Boutonnais (11)
14.	ES Aunisienne Aytré (10)	1–7	AS Portugais Niort (8)
15.	ALFC Fontcouverte (10)	1–4	AS St Yrieix (8)
16.	FC Sévigné Jonzac-St Germain (11)	2–1	FC Sud Charente (12)
17.	Oléron FC (9)	3–2 (a.e.t.)	AS Merpins (10)
18.	Soubise OC (12)	2–4	AS Aiffres (9)
19.	CS Allassac (11)	3–5 (a.e.t.)	US Vigenal Bastide (9)
20.	AS Jugeals-Noailles (9)	1–1 (3–4 p)	SA Le Palais-sur-Vienne (8)
21.	Espérance St Robertoise (11)	0–4	JS Lafarge Limoges (8)
22.	AS Seilhac (11)	0–8	US St Vaury (9)
23.	ES Ussel (10)	4–2 (a.e.t.)	US Felletin (10)
24.	ES Ardin (10)	4–0	FC Tonnacquois (10)
25.	ES Celles-Verrines (9)	3–0	La Rochelle Villeneuve FC (8)
26.	US Frontenay-St Symph (12)	0–0 (2–3 p)	EFC DB2S (10)
27.	Gati-Foot (12)	2–1	La Jarrie FC (11)
28.	Val de Boutonne Foot 79 (11)	2–5	Rochefort FC (9)
29.	AS Civaux (11)	3–0 (Note: OFC Ruelle penalised for fielding a suspended player. Original score 1–2)	OFC Ruelle (9)
30.	US Payroux (12)	1–1 (3–4 p)	ES Mornac (11)
31.	FC Rouillé (11)	5–0	Avenir 79 FC (12)
32.	SS Sillars (11)	0–4	ASFC Vindelle (11)
33.	SC Verrières (11)	1–4	AS Puymoyen (9)
34.	Avenir Bellac-Berneuil-St Junien-les-Combes (9)	2–0	JS Garat-Sers-Vouzan (10)
35.	AS Châteauneuf-Neuvic (8)	1–2	SS Ste Féréole (9)
36.	US Le Dorat (12)	1–2	CS St Michel-sur-Charente (11)
37.	Mayotte FC Limoges (9)	1–2	ES Marchoise (8)
38.	US Oradour-sur-Glane (10)	2–4	AS Villebois Haute Boëme (8)
39.	AS St Junien (10)	0–2	AS Brie (10)
40.	St Yrieix FC (12)	0–3	Cosnac FC (11)
41.	AS Laguenne-Ste Fortunade-Lagarde-Enval (11)	0–3	EF Aubussonais (8)
42.	US Baignes (11)	0–3	St Palais SF (8)
43.	ESE Charentais (11)	0–4	FC Fleuré (10)
44.	US Lessac (10)	0–2	CA St Savin-St Germain (8)
45.	ES Linars (11)	4–3	US Saujon (11)
46.	AS St Adjutory (13)	1–5	ES Brion-St Secondin (11)
47.	UA St Sulpice-de-Cognac (10)	0–1	JS Semussac (10)
48.	FC Taizé-Aizie (12)	1–1 (5–4 p)	ES Château-Larcher (10)
49.	AS Vars (12)	0–2	AS Valdivienne (12)
50.	AF Presqu'île Arvert (12)	0–3	AS Grande Champagne (11)
51.	FC Atlantique (12)	11–1	ES Fomperron-Ménigoute (13)
52.	Breuil-Magné FC (11)	0–2	US Mauzé-sur-le-Mignon (11)
53.	Clérac-Orignolles-St Martin-du-Lary (11)	4–8	JS Sireuil (8)
54.	Échillais-St Agnant-Beaugeay FC (11)	0–3	Stade Vouillé (11)
55.	FC Fouras-St Laurent (12)	0–5	UA Niort St Florent (8)
56.	FC La Jarne (11)	3–1	AR Cherveux (12)
57.	AAAM Laleu-La Pallice (9)	2–1	AS Pays Mellois (9)
58.	FC Meschers-Mortagne (12)	1–3	AL St Brice (11)
59.	FC Montendre (11)	0–1	SC Mouthiers (9)
60.	ES Port-des-Barques (11)	4–4 (4–5 p)	Jarnac SF (8)
61.	ES St Just-Luzac (11)	0–2	UF Barbezieux-Barret (9)
62.	CO La Couronne (10)	1–2	ES Thénacaise (10)
63.	US Aunisien Puyravault (11)	2–0	ASPTT Bessines (12)
64.	Entente des Barrages de la Xaintrie (11)	1–0	FC Sauviat (11)
65.	FRJEP Cornil (10)	2–1	US St Fiel (10)
66.	Olympique Larche Lafeuillade (9)	5–2	US St Léonard-de-Noblat (8)
67.	FREP St Germain (11)	4–2	US Le Grand-Bourg (11)
68.	FC St Jal (12)	1–2	JS Chambon-sur-Voueize (10)
69.	AS St Martial-de-Gimel (12)	2–3	AS Reterre-Fontanières (12)
70.	ES Ussac (10)	1–0	USE Couzeix-Chaptelat (9)
71.	ES Bénévent-Marsac (10)	4–3 (a.e.t.)	CA Égletons (10)
72.	ES Évaux-Budelière (11)	1–2 (a.e.t.)	US St Clementoise (10)
73.	USS Mérinchal (10)	0–1	Amicale St Hilaire-Venarsal (10)
74.	ES Nouziers-La Cellette (11)	1–6	US Beaune-les-Mines (11)
75.	US Versillacoise (11)	1–6	US Nantiat (10)
76.	ES St Maurice-la-Souterraine (11)	1–3	AS Nieul (8)
77.	ES St Sulpice-le-Guérétois (9)	3–2 (a.e.t.)	CA Meymac (8)
78.	FC Pays Argentonnais (10)	2–1	SL Cenon-sur-Vienne (11)
79.	CS Beauvoir-sur-Niort (11)	3–0	US Aigrefeuille (12)
80.	ES Bocage (12)	0–5	SL Antran (9)
81.	ACS Mahorais (12)	2–1 (a.e.t.)	FC ASM (13)
82.	US Brion 79 (13)	1–4	ES Vouneuil-sous-Biard (11)
83.	ES Brûlain (13)	2–6	Stade Ruffec (9)
84.	AS Portugais Cerizay (11)	1–5	FC Fontaine-le-Comte (9)
85.	US Champdeniers-Pamplie (11)	3–0 (Note: AS Aigre penalised for fielding a suspended player. Original scoreline 1–4 (a.e.t.))	AS Aigre (12)
86.	ES Chanteloup-Chapelle (10)	4–0	US Mirebeau (11)
87.	FC Chiché (12)	2–1	SC Chasseneuil-du-Poitou (9)
88.	Avenir Autize (12)	1–7	Avenir Matha (9)
89.	AS Coulonges-Thouarsais (12)	6–0	FC Loudun (10)
90.	SEPC Exireuil (12)	5–2	FC St Rogatien (12)
91.	ES Fayenoirterre (12)	0–3	ES St Benoit (10)
92.	FC Haute Val de Sèvre (12)	0–5	AS Maritime (9)
93.	SC L'Absie-Largeasse (12)	2–0	AS Cabariot (9)
94.	ES Mougon (13)	0–3	Aunis Avenir FC (9)
95.	Les Muguets de Moutiers-sous-Chantemerle (12)	1–6	Espérance Availles-en-Châtellerault (11)
96.	US Pays Maixentais (12)	1–1 (4–5 p)	US Mélusine (10)
97.	ES St Amand-sur-Sèvre (12)	0–2	US Jaunay-Clan (12)
98.	FC St Jean-Missé (12)	0–2	AS Portugais Châtellerault (8)
99.	AS St Pierre-des-Échaubrognes (11)	3–0	Chabournay FC (12)
100.	FC Sud Gatine (12)	0–2	US Aulnay (10)
101.	Espérance Terves (8)	1–3 (a.e.t.)	US Migné-Auxances (9)
102.	Entente Voulmentin-St Aubin-du-Plain (10)	1–6	ES Trois Cités Poitiers (9)
103.	US Béruges (12)	1–2 (a.e.t.)	ES Pinbrécières (10)
104.	Boivre SC (11)	1–2	SA Moncoutant (9)
105.	FC Cernay (12)	0–4	FC Nueillaubiers (8)
106.	CS Chatain (13)	0–2	Nersac FC (10)
107.	Sud Vienne Région de Couhé (12)	2–8	Buslaurs Thireuil (11)
108.	Croutelle FC (15)	1–8	CA St Aubin-le-Cloud (12)
109.	US La Ferrière-Airoux (13)	2–3	Coqs Rouges Mansle (10)
110.	ES Lavoux-Liniers (14)	0–7	EF Le Tallud (9)
111.	US Leignes-sur-Fontaine (13)	1–2	ES Champniers (10)
112.	US Marigny St Léger (13)	0–3	ES St Cerbouillé (9)
113.	SA Mauzé-Rigné (11)	0–6	CS Naintré (8)
114.	AS Mignaloux-Beauvoir (10)	1–2	RC Parthenay Viennay (8)
115.	FC Montamisé (9)	3–1	US Vasléenne (10)
116.	JS Nieuil l'Espoir (9)	3–4	Tardoire FC La Roche/Rivières (10)
117.	US Nord Vienne (12)	2–4	FC Vrines (11)
118.	Ozon FC (10)	3–4 (a.e.t.)	FC Pays de l'Ouin (9)
119.	AS Cheminots Poitiers-Biard (12)	0–4 (Note: AS Cheminots Poitiers-Biard penalised for a technical infringement. Original scoreline 2–4)	US St Varent Pierregeay (11)
120.	CO St Genest d'Ambière (12)	1–8	US Combranssière (8)
121.	AAS St Julien-l'Ars (10)	1–0 (a.e.t.)	ES Louzy (11)
122.	Entente St Maurice-Gençay (12)	1–6	FC Charente Limousine (9)
123.	AS St Saviol (12)	1–5 (a.e.t.)	US Lezay (10)
124.	AS Sèvres-Anxaumont (12)	0–0 (4–3 p)	ES Beaulieu-Breuil (11)
125.	US Thuré Besse (12)	2–4	US St Sauveur (8)
126.	US Usson-du-Poitou (12)	5–3 (a.e.t.)	FC Confolentais (10)
127.	US Vicq-sur-Gartempe (11)	1–1 (1–4 p)	US Vrère-St Léger-de-Montbrun (11)
128.	AS Ambazac (10)	1–4	Varetz AC (8)
129.	Football Cognacois Cyrien Laurentais (12)	0–1	US Chasseneuil (10)
130.	AS Fromental (12)	1–2	USC Bourganeuf (10)
131.	Amicale Franco-Portugais Limoges (8)	1–0	Auvézère Foot 19 (9)
132.	Limoges Landouge (9)	0–3	US Donzenac (8)
133.	AS St Louis Val de l'Aurence (12)	0–3	CS Boussac (9)
134.	AS Nexon (10)	2–2 (4–3 p)	FC Argentat (8)
135.	FC Canton d'Oradour-sur-Vayres (11)	3–0	AS Concèze (10)
136.	AS Panazol (10)	5–0	AS Beynat (9)
137.	SC Verneuil-sur-Vienne (9)	5–1	ES Nonards (8)

=== Champagne-Ardenne ===
These matches were played on 21 August 2016.

First round results: Champagne-Ardenne

Tie no	Home team (tier)	Score	Away team (tier)
1.	ES Auvillers/Signy-le-Petit (11)	1–5	AS Neuville-lès-This (9)
2.	US Balan (9)	2–4	FC Blagny-Carignan (9)
3.	US Flize (11)	4–2	ES Charleville-Mézières (10)
4.	AS Charleville Franco-Turque (9)	0–3	US Deux Vireux (8)
5.	Liart-Signy-l'Abbaye FC (10)	0–3	FC Porcien (10)
6.	AS Sault-lès-Rethel (10)	1–2	Sormonne SL (10)
7.	Floing FC (10)	1–1 (12–11 p)	JS Vrignoise (8)
8.	Cheveuges-St Aignan CO (10)	4–1	US Ayvelles (10)
9.	FC Maubert-Fontaine (11)	1–0 (a.e.t.)	FC Chooz (9)
10.	AS Bourg-Rocroi (9)	3–0	US Fumay-Charnois (9)
11.	US Revin (9)	1–2	FC Haybes (11)
12.	ES Vouziers (10)	0–2	AS Asfeld (8)
13.	ES Saulces-Monclin (11)	0–4	USC Nouvion-sur-Meuse (8)
14.	QV Douzy (8)	2–0	SC Vivarois (9)
15.	US Margut (11)	0–6	FC Allobais Doncherois (8)
16.	AS Lumes (10)	3–0	AS Messincourt (11)
17.	AS Mouzon (9)	1–3	Le Theux FC (8)
18.	Amicale Bagneux-Clesles (10)	1–4	CS Trois Vallées (9)
19.	Stade Briennois (9)	2–2 (3–4 p)	Olympique Chapelain (9)
20.	Étoile Lusigny (11)	3–0	UCS Portugais Romilly (10)
21.	JS Vaudoise (9)	3–4	Bar-sur-Aube FC (8)
22.	Torvilliers AC (11)	3–7 (a.e.t.)	FC Vallant/Les Grès (9)
23.	Rosières Omnisports (9)	1–4	ES Municipaux Troyes (8)
24.	Alliance Sud-Ouest Football Aubois (9)	2–3 (a.e.t.)	US Maizières-Chatres (9)
25.	AS Portugaise Nogent-sur-Seine (9)	1–3	AFM Romilly (8)
26.	Renouveau Ramerupt (10)	3–0	Romilly Sports Dix (10)
27.	SC Savières (10)	3–0	UCS Nogentaise (10)
28.	FC Chesterfield (10)	0–3	ESC Melda (8)
29.	US Starnacienne (9)	3–4	FC Europort (10)
30.	FC Vesle (10)	2–5	FC Christo (8)
31.	AS Courtisols ESTAN (9)	1–3	ES Fagnières (9)
32.	Bétheny FC (10)	1–2	US Fismes (9)
33.	Foyer Compertrix (11)	5–3	FC Faux-Vésigneul/Pogny (10)
34.	US Couvrot (10)	7–0	FC Bignicourier (11)
35.	AS Marolles (10)	5–4	AS Heiltz-le-Maurupt (11)
36.	Entente Somsois/Margerie/St Utin (10)	5–2	AS Mairy-sur-Marne (11)
37.	SC Montmirail (10)	4–0	ES Gaye (11)
38.	US Dizy (10)	3–0	ES Muizon (11)
39.	US St Martin-d'Ablois (10)	0–2	SC Dormans (9)
40.	Espérance Rémoise (9)	0–1	AS St Brice-Courcelles (10)
41.	ES Connantre-Corroy (11)	5–1	ES Pierry-Moussy (10)
42.	FCF La Neuvillette (9)	3–0	AS Orgeval
43.	US Oiry (10)	1–2	FC Sillery (9)
44.	FCER Bisseuil (11)	2–6	SC de la Suippe (10)
45.	Reims Murigny Franco Portugais (10)	1–2	AS Mourmelon-Livry-Bouy (11)
46.	FC Pargny-sur-Saulx (10)	2–1 (a.e.t.)	FC St Martin-sur-le-Pré/La Veuve/Recy (8)
47.	USS Sermaize (10)	3–0	AS Cheminon (10)
48.	FC Champ de Manoeuvre (10)	0–3	FC Côte des Blancs (8)
49.	ES Witry-les-Reims (8)	0–1	AS Cernay-Berru-Lavannes (8)
50.	FC Turcs Épernay (9)	3–0 (Note: Reims Chalet Tunisie penalised for a technical infringement. FC Turcs Épernay progress to the second round. Original scoreline was 1–3)	Reims Chalet Tunisie (8)
51.	Foyer Bayard (11)	3–0	FC Bologne (10)
52.	US Biesles (10)	4–0	US Bricon-Orges (10)
53.	CS Chalindrey (10)	1–2	CA Rolampontais (9)
54.	AF Valcourt (9)	1–5	SL Ornel (8)
55.	AS Froncles (11)	2–9	FC Prez Bourmont (9)
56.	Stade Chevillonais (9)	7–1	AS Esnouveaux (10)
57.	FC Joinville-Vecqueville (9)	0–3	FC CS Bragard (9)
58.	CS Villiers-en-Lieu (9)	3–0	AS Poissons-Noncourt (9)
59.	FC Laville-aux-Bois (10)	0–1	AS Lasarjonc (10)
60.	ES Corgirnon-Chaudenay (10)	2–3 (a.e.t.)	US Bourbonnaise (9)
61.	ES Prauthoy-Vaux (9)	1–2	SR Neuilly-l'Évêque (9)
62.	Espérance St Dizier (8)	1–2	AS Sarrey-Montigny (8)
63.	IFA Chaumontaise (11)	3–0	ASF Grand St Dizier
64.	CS Maranville-Rennepont (10)	2–5	DS Eurville-Bienville (8)
65.	JS Remilly-Aillicourt (10)	4–0	US St Menges (10)

=== Franche-Comté ===
These matches were played on 20 and 21 August 2016.

First round results: Franche-Comté

Tie no	Home team (tier)	Score	Away team (tier)
1.	AS Noidanais (11)	1–7	Jura Dolois Foot (6)
2.	FC Haute Vallée de l'Ognon (10)	3–4 (a.e.t.)	JS Lure (8)
3.	SC St Loup-Corbenay-Maginoncourt (10)	0–4	AS Luxeuil (8)
4.	AS Bavilliers (8)	2–0	US Châtenois-les-Forges (7)
5.	AS Fougerolles (9)	3–0	Vallée du Breuchin FC (10)
6.	FC Mouchard-Arc-et-Senans (8)	0–2	AS Levier (6)
7.	AS Sâone-Mamirolle (8)	2–1	RC Voujeaucourt (9)
8.	ASC Planoise-St Ferjeux (7)	0–1 (Note: ASC Planoise-St Ferjeux penalised. Original scoreline 2–1)	AS Orchamps-Vennes (7)
9.	US Nancray-Osse (10)	1–2	ES Pays Maîchois (8)
10.	US Franchevelle (10)	3–1	SR Delle (12)
11.	AS Pierrefontaine et Laviron (11)	1–2	AS Méziré-Fesches-le-Châtel (7)
12.	SCM Valdoie (8)	2–4	US Montbéliardaise (8)
13.	Amancey-Bolandoz-Chantrans Foot (10)	4–1	ASC Velotte Besançon (9)
14.	ASPTT Grand-Lons-Jura (11)	1–0	FC Lac-Remoray-Vaux (10)
15.	US Près de Vaux (11)	1–5	Bresse Jura Foot (6)
16.	US Avanne-Aveney (10)	0–2	Triangle d'Or Jura Foot (7)
17.	PS Dole-Crissey (10)	1–2	ES Doubs (10)
18.	ES Sirod (10)	2–4	US Rioz-Étuz-Cussey (7)
19.	FC Haut Jura (9)	0–2	Jura Lacs Foot (7)
20.	AS Byans-Osselle (11)	1–4	FC Champagnole (6)
21.	US Crotenay Combe d'Ain (9)	2–2 (2–3 p)	FC Damparis (8)
22.	FC Rochefort-Amange (10)	0–2	AS Foucherans (8)
23.	FC Val de Loue (9)	5–2	Poligny-Grimont FC (8)
24.	AS Vaux-lès-Saint-Claude (8)	1–3	FC Montfaucon-Morre-Gennes-La Vèze (7)
25.	US Trois Monts (9)	1–4	US Coteaux de Seille (7)
26.	AS Morbier (8)	9–0	RCF St Claude (9)
27.	FC Plaine 39 (10)	4–1	Olympique Montmorot (9)
28.	FC Aiglepierre (10)	2–0	ES Les Fonges (10)
29.	FCC La Joux (10)	1–4	Entente Sud-Revermont (8)
30.	Jura Nord Foot (8)	3–0	RC Lons-le-Saunier (7)
31.	Drugeon Sports (11)	1–0	CS Frasne (9)
32.	ES Dannemarie (8)	3–0	Espérance Arc-Gray (9)
33.	ES Lièvremont (10)	3–6	AS Château de Joux (8)
34.	ES Marnaysienne (9)	1–0	FC Morteau-Montlebon (7)
35.	US Passavant (11)	1–2	FC L'Isle-sur-le-Doubs (7)
36.	FC Massif Haut Doubs (11)	0–3	SC Clémenceau Besançon (6)
37.	FC Les 2 Vels (8)	3–5 (a.e.t.)	CS Portusien (9)
38.	US Pusey (10)	0–3	AEP Pouilly-les-Vignes (8)
39.	US Rigny (10)	0–3	FC Noidanais (7)
40.	ES Montenois (11)	0–1 (a.e.t.)	FC Pirey-École-Valentin (9)
41.	FC Émagny-Pin (10)	2–4	US Larians-et-Munans (8)
42.	US Scey-sur-Saône (8)	0–2	US Les Écorces (8)
43.	FC Châtillon-Devecey (8)	1–3	ES Entre Roches (8)
44.	ES Les Sapins (10)	0–1	FC Valdahon-Vercel (7)
45.	ES Combeaufontaine-Lavoncourt-Laitre (10)	1–4	ASC Soma Tsara Mahoraise (10)
46.	AS Perrouse (9)	1–6	FC 4 Rivières 70 (7)
47.	Thise-Chalezeule FC (9)	1–4	FC Vesoul (7)
48.	Espérance Auxon-Miserey (10)	1–2	SG Héricourt (8)
49.	Rougement Concorde (10)	3–0	AS Avoudrey (10)
50.	AS Feule Solemont (11)	0–4	ASL Autechaux-Roide (9)
51.	AS Danjoutin-Andelnans-Méroux (9)	8–0	FC Colombe (9)
52.	US Les Fontenelles (12)	2–1	ES Exincourt-Taillecourt (7)
53.	FC Pays Minier (10)	4–1	AS Présentevillers-Ste Marie (10)
54.	Olympique Courcelles-lès-Montbéliard (10)	5–1	FC Seloncourt (10)
55.	AS Hérimoncourt (9)	3–1	US Arcey (10)
56.	US Sous-Roches (8)	0–4	AS Audincourt (8)
57.	AS Chaux (11)	1–6	FC Bart (7)
58.	FAC Lougres (11)	1–5	US Aillevillers (9)
59.	Le Réveil de Conflans (10)	0–4	US Sochaux (7)
60.	FC Le Russey (11)	0–5	FC Giro-Lepuix (8)
61.	CS Beaucourt (7)	1–3 (a.e.t.)	AS Baume-les-Dames (6)
62.	US Les Fins (11)	1–4	US Colombier-Fontaine (8)
63.	AS Frambouhans (11)	1–7	AS Mélisey-St Barthélemy (8)
64.	US St Hippolyte (11)	0–2	FC Villars-sous-Écot (9)
65.	Olympique Montbéliard (9)	5–1	Longevelle SC (10)
66.	AS Essert (9)	0–3	ES Charquemont (10)
67.	FC Forges Audincourt (10)	0–3	AS Nord Territoire (10)
68.	ASFC Belfort (8)	1–1 (1–3 p)	AS Belfort Sud (7)
69.	Bessoncourt Roppe Club Larivière (10)	4–0	FC Breuches (10)
70.	SC Villers-le-Lac (10)	3–5	Haute-Lizaine Pays d'Héricourt (8)
71.	AS Rougegoutte (8)	0–1	FC Grandvillars (6)
72.	SC Jussey (10)	0–3	Entente Roche-Novillars (6)
73.	AS Mouthe (13)	0–3	AS Mont D'Usiers (9)

=== Languedoc-Roussillon ===
These matches were played on 19, 20, 21 and 28 August 2016.

First round results: Languedoc-Roussillon

Tie no	Home team (tier)	Score	Away team (tier)
1.	AS St Georges-de-Lévéjac (10)	4–1	ES Rimeize (11)
2.	ES Pérols (9)	1–2	SO Aimargues (7)
3.	Entente Fournels-Nasbinals (13)	2–1	AS Randonnaise (11)
4.	FC St Féliu-d'Avall (10)	0–3	FC St Cyprien-Latour (8)
5.	FC Alzonnais (8)	3–5	ES Arzens (9)
6.	Razès Olympique (8)	6–1	RC Badens-Rustiques-Aigues-Vives (11)
7.	FC Berriac	0–3	FC Malepère (9)
8.	FC Alaric-Puichéric (8)	1–2 (a.e.t.)	FC Briolet (7)
9.	Entente Naurouze-Labastide (8)	2–6	US Conques (7)
10.	FC Chalabre (9)	0–5	CO Castelnaudary (7)
11.	US Montagne Noir (9)	1–2	Limoux-Pieusse FC (9)
12.	UF Lézignanais (7)	4–1	FC Corbières Méditerranée (7)
13.	AS Lasbordes (9)	1–2	Olympic Cuxac-d'Aude (9)
14.	MJC Gruissan (7)	3–0	ES Fanjeaux-La Piège (9)
15.	Haut-Minervois Olympique (8)	1–0	UFC Narbonne (10)
16.	ES Malvoise (11)	1–3	FC Vallée du Lauquet (8)
17.	Luc FC (10)	4–7	FC Pennautier (10)
18.	Olympique Montréalais (11)	1–3	US Minervois (8)
19.	Olympique Moussan-Montredon (8)	1–0	AS Saissac-Cabardès (9)
20.	USA Pezens (8)	6–0	Spartak Preixan (11)
21.	Trèbes FC (7)	6–0	US Salhersienne (9)
22.	AS Ventenac (12)	0–2	FC St Nazairois (9)
23.	ASC Villalier (11)	0–16	Omnisport St Papoul (8)
24.	Trapel FC (8)	1–2	FC Villedubert (9)
25.	FC Villegly (9)	0–2	ES Ste Eulalie-Villesèquelande (8)
26.	Cabestany OC (8)	2–5	Olympique Alenya (8)
27.	FC St Estève (7)	3–0	Olympique Haut Vallespir (12)
28.	FC Cerdagne-Font-Romeu-Capcir (10)	0–3	AS Prades (9)
29.	BECE FC Vallée de l'Aigly (8)	3–2	Céret-Maureillas FC (8)
30.	US Bompas (8)	6–1	FC Aspres (11)
31.	Ille-sur-Têt FC (8)	6–2	Salanca FC (8)
32.	SO Rivesaltais (9)	2–3	Perpignan FC Bas-Vernet (7)
33.	Le Boulou-St Jean-Pla-de-Corts FC (10)	0–2	Si T'Es Sport Perpignan (8)
34.	Albères Côte Vermeille (9)	1–2	AS Perpignan Méditerranée (7)
35.	FC Thuirinois (8)	2–3	FC Laurentin (7)
36.	Les Amis de Cédric Brunier (12)	3–2	FC Villelongue (9)
37.	Théza-Corneilla FC (9)	0–3	ASC St Nazaire (11)
38.	AC Alignanais (9)	5–1	US Bédaricienne-Pays d'Orb-Gravezon (11)
39.	Baillargues-St Brès-Valergues (8)	3–1	AS Juvignac (10)
40.	AS Canétoise (8)	9–0	OS Biterrois (10)
41.	Avenir Castriote (10)	1–3	RSO Cournonterral (11)
42.	FC Clermontais (10)	3–5	USO Florensac-Pinet (9)
43.	RS Gigeannais (10)	2–3	ES Cœur Hérault (10)
44.	Olympique La Peyrade FC (8)	3–0	EFC Beaucairois (12)
45.	US Villeveyracoise (10)	3–0	FC Montpellier Cévennes (10)
46.	OF Thézan-St Geniès (12)	2–6	FC Lamalou (9)
47.	AS Valergues (11)	2–3	US Villeneuvoise (10)
48.	US Pougetoise (10)	1–3	PI Vendargues (7)
49.	AS St Martin Montpellier (8)	4–4 (4–3 p)	CA Poussan (8)
50.	ASPTT Montpellier (10)	2–3	FC Pradéen (10)
51.	AS Montarnaud-St Paul-Vaihauques-Murviel (8)	11–1	JS Plaissanaise (11)
52.	SC Jacou (9)	2–6	AS Gignacaise (7)
53.	US Montagnacoise (9)	6–0	ES Fraisse-La Salvetat (10)
54.	RC Lemasson Montpellier (11)	3–0	SO Lansarguois (9)
55.	US Basses-Cévennes (10)	2–3	FC Lavérune (9)
56.	Entente Corneilhan-Lignan (10)	8–3	AS Lodève (12)
57.	AS Pignan (8)	1–2	GC Lunel (7)
58.	SC St Thibery (11)	1–2	FC Petit Bard (7)
59.	FC Neffies (11)	0–1	ASC Paillade Mercure (11)
60.	FC Prémian (11)	0–4	AS Puissalicon-Magalas (9)
61.	Stade Montblanais Foot (9)	4–4 (2–3 p)	Olympique Maraussanais Biterrois (11)
62.	Pointe Courte AC Sète (9)	5–0	Montpellier Mosson Massane (11)
63.	ASP Teyran (11)	3–1	Pompignane SC (11)
64.	FC Sussargues-Berange (10)	3–0	Arsenal Croix d'Argent FC (10)
65.	FC St Pargoire (10)	0–2	ROC Social Sète (10)
66.	FO Sud Hérault (10)	5–1	FCO Valras-Serignan (10)
67.	FC Servian (11)	2–6	RC Vedasien (9)
68.	AS St Mathieu-de-Tréviers (9)	1–3	Olympique St-André-de-Sangonis (7)
69.	RC St Georges-d'Orques (9)	3–0	AS St Gilloise (9)
70.	ES Trois Moulins (10)	2–1	FC Cévennes (9)
71.	ES St Bauzély (9)	3–0	Sedisud FC (14)
72.	Football Sud Lozère (10)	0–4	US Monoblet (8)
73.	AS Chastelloise (11)	6–7	Entente Chirac-Le Monastier (11)
74.	FC Ribaute-les-Tavernes (11)	0–3	ESC Le Buisson (9)
75.	AS St Privat-des-Vieux (8)	3–0	AS Salindroise (10)
76.	Omnisports St Hilaire-La Jasse (9)	12–0	Olympique Mageois (12)
77.	Margerite FC (12)	0–3	OM Pontil-Pradel (11)
78.	Valdonnez FC (11)	1–2	Besseges-St Ambroix FC (9)
79.	AS St Christol-lès-Alès (8)	0–1	AS Nîmes Athletic (8)
80.	CS Cheminot Nîmois (10)	0–5	Stade Beaucairois (7)
81.	ES Aigues-Vives-Aubais (10)	2–5	CO Soleil Levant Nîmes (7)
82.	GS Gardois (10)	2–1	FC Pays Viganais Aigoual (9)
83.	UFC Aimargues (10)	5–1	FC Cruviers-Lascours (10)
84.	Olympique Fourquesien (9)	0–3	AS Caissargues (9)
85.	AS Vaunage (11)	1–0	Nîmes Lasallien (8)
86.	FC Canabier (8)	6–1	FC Eau Bouillie (12)
87.	GC Quissacois (10)	2–6	AFC Nîmes Jeunes Mayotte (11)
88.	FCO Domessargues (10)	2–1	SO Codognan (9)
89.	FC Langlade (9)	1–4	FC Val de Cèze (7)
90.	FC Pont-St-Esprit (10)	0–1	GC Gallarguois (9)
91.	RC Générac (8)	3–1	FC St Alexandre Olympique (10)
92.	AS Sommières (11)	4–6	AS Poulx (9)
93.	FC La Calmette (11)	4–2	SC Nîmois (11)
94.	US Garons (11)	4–1	ES Grau-du-Roi (9)
95.	SC Manduellois (10)	2–1	US Trèfle (8)
96.	AS St Paulet (9)	8–0	AS St Victor-de-Malcap (12)
97.	ES Marguerittes (9)	3–5	FC Chusclan-Laudun-l'Ardoise (8)
98.	GC Gallician (9)	2–7	AEC St Gilles (7)
99.	OC Redessan (9)	1–1 (4–3 p)	Remoulins FC (9)
100.	SA Cigalois	0–3	ES Suménoise (10)
101.	FC Vauverdois (8)	4–0	ES Théziers (11)
102.	ES Rochefort Signargues (9)	3–4	Entente Perrier Vergèze (8)
103.	FC Rodilhan (10)	0–3	RC St Laurent-des-Arbres (10)
104.	US Lunel-Vielloise (9)	3–0	Bouzigues-Loupian AC (9)
105.	FC Maurin (9)	6–3	ASPTT Lunel (11)
106.	US Mauguio Carnon (8)	2–0	Crabe Sportif Marseillan (9)
107.	Olympique Midi Lirou Capestang-Poilhes (10)	1–5	Mèze Stade FC (7)
108.	Saleilles OC (9)	1–2	FC Le Soler (8)
109.	ES Bassan (11)	0–4	US Béziers (8)
110.	ES Cazouls-Maraussan-Maureilhan (10)	0–4	SC Cers-Portiragnes (8)
111.	Vaillante Aumonaise (10)	0–4	AS Badaroux (9)
112.	AS Le Malzieu (11)	3–0	SC St Privat-des-Vieux (12)
113.	AS Bram (10)	2–1	Olympique Ozanam (12)

=== Maine ===
These matches were played on 21 August 2016.

First round results: Maine

Tie no	Home team (tier)	Score	Away team (tier)
1.	CS Javron-Neuilly (11)	2–3	CS St Pierre-des-Landes (10)
2.	Larchamp LMFC (11)	0–3	USC Pays de Montsurs (9)
3.	US Chantrigné (10)	1–3	FC Ambrières (10)
4.	FC Montaigu 53 (12)	0–8	Hermine St Ouennaise (8)
5.	ASPTT Laval (11)	2–1	ASO Montenay (8)
6.	SC Le Ham (11)	1–3	CA Evronnais (8)
7.	AS Martigné-sur-Mayenne (11)	5–1	AS Le Bourgneuf-la-Forêt (10)
8.	FC Landivy-Pontmain (11)	0–2	Gorron FC (9)
9.	AS Brée (11)	2–4	Ernéenne Foot (8)
10.	AS La Baconnière (11)	1–1 (2–3 p)	FA Laval Bonne Lorraine (10)
11.	US Pré-en-Pail (11)	0–1 (Note: US Fougerolles penalised for fielding a suspended player. US Pré-en-Pail progress to the second round.)	US Fougerolles (10)
12.	Brecé Sports (12)	0–3	US Cigné (10)
13.	AS Oisseau (11)	2–2 (4–3 p)	Voltigeurs St Georges-Buttavent (10)
14.	US La Bigottière-Alexain (11)	0–3	AS Andouillé (9)
15.	CA Voutréen (11)	3–1	FC Lassay (9)
16.	FC Ménil (12)	0–3	ES Craon (8)
17.	US Simplé-Marigné-Peuton (12)	1–7	AG Laigné (10)
18.	AS Vaiges (11)	2–4	Alerte Ahuillé FC (9)
19.	US Renazé (11)	0–1	FC Château-Gontier (9)
20.	AS Loigné-sur-Mayenne (11)	0–1	US Dyonisienne (10)
21.	Bierné-Gennes FC (11)	1–7	US Méral-Cossé (8)
22.	US Athée (12)	2–6	US Forcé (9)
23.	FC Montjean (11)	1–3	FC Ruillé-Loiron (9)
24.	ES Beaulieu-sur-Oudon (12)	1–5	ES Quelainaise (9)
25.	FC La Selle-Craonnaise (11)	2–2 (3–2 p)	JG Coudray (10)
26.	US Argentré (11)	2–0	AS Meslay-du-Maine (8)
27.	JA Soulgé-sur-Ouette (10)	3–1	US St Pierre-la-Cour (10)
28.	AS Ballée (11)	0–2	US Laval (8)
29.	US Ballots (12)	0–3	US Entrammes (9)
30.	US Le Genest (9)	4–3	US Réunionnaise Laval (11)
31.	US Pays de Juhel (10)	1–3	FC Pays de Sillé (9)
32.	ES Montfort-le-Gesnois (11)	0–2	US La Chapelle-St-Rémy (10)
33.	ES Dissayen (11)	2–4	La Patriote Bonnétable (8)
34.	AS Étival (11)	1–2	FC La Bazoge (10)
35.	Lombron Sports (11)	1–1 (1–3 p)	AS St Jean-d'Assé (10)
36.	US St Ouen-St Biez (12)	0–3	La Vigilante Mayet (10)
37.	AS La Milesse (11)	0–5	FC Val du Loir (10)
38.	US Savigné-l'Évêque (11)	1–2	CS Sablons-Gazonfier (9)
39.	US Oizé (12)	0–6	US Crosmièroise (10)
40.	AS St Paterne (12)	2–4	ASPTT Le Mans (10)
41.	Internationale du Mans (13)	0–3	CO Laigné-St Gervais (10)
42.	AS Juigné-sur-Sarthe (11)	1–2	US Nautique Spay (8)
43.	US Conlie (11)	1–3	Beaumont SA (9)
44.	US La Chapelle-d'Aligné (12)	0–2	AS St Pavace (8)
45.	Française Pontvallain (11)	0–4	AS La Chapelle-St-Aubin (8)
46.	USR La Quinte (12)	0–3	UC Auvers-Poillé (10)
47.	Fillé Sport (12)	1–3	CO Castélorien (9)
48.	US Challoise (12)	0–6	EG Rouillon (9)
49.	US Yvré-le-Pôlin (11)	1–12	US Roézé (8)
50.	US Le Luart (12)	1–3	US Bouloire (10)
51.	AS Neuville-sur-Sarthe (11)	2–4	US Vibraysienne (9)
52.	AS Thorigné-sur-Dué (11)	3–3 (2–4 p)	SC Tuffé (10)
53.	US Chantenay-Villedieu (11)	1–7	JS Parigné-l'Évêque (8)
54.	GSI Saosnois Courgains (12)	1–3	US St Mars-la-Brière (8)
55.	CO Cormes (11)	1–6	SS Noyen-sur-Sarthe (8)
56.	FC St Georges-Pruillé (11)	1–2	AS Ruaudin (10)
57.	US Tennie-St Symphorien (11)	0–5	JS Solesmienne (10)
58.	AS Chédouet (11)	1–6 (Note: JS Allonnes penalised for fielding a suspended player. AS Chédouet progressed to the second round.)	JS Allonnes (10)
59.	Le Mans GS (11)	1–4	CS Changé (9)
60.	Union Le Mans Sud (11)	1–2	US Mansigné (10)
61.	US Précigné (11)	1–1 (4–3 p)	CA Loué (10)
62.	AS Lamnay (13)	0–6	OS Dollon (10)
63.	AS Sargéenne (11)	2–0	JS Ludoise (10)
64.	ES Yvré-l'Évêque (11)	1–6	US Glonnières (8)
65.	ES Pommerieux (11)	0–4	AS Contest-St Baudelle (10)

=== Midi-Pyrénées ===
The first round in Midi-Pyrénées is organised by individual districts. The matches were played on 19, 20 and 21 August 2016.

First round results: Midi-Pyrénées, District de l'Ariège

Tie no	Home team (tier)	Score	Away team (tier)
1.	FC Caumont (11)	0–3	ES St Jean-du-Falga (8)
2.	Tarascon FC (10)	1–2	FC St Girons (10)
3.	Entente Varilhes/St Jean-de-Verges (10)	3–0	US Les Cabannes (11)
4.	Un Jeune Avenir (12)	3–0	FC Séronais (10)
5.	FC Mirepoix (10)	1–1 (10–9 p)	EN Mazères (9)
6.	FC Laroque d'Olmes (10)	0–3	FC Pamiers (8)
7.	FC Coussa (10)	0–6	AS Rieux-de-Pelleport (9)
8.	FC Pays d'Olmes (10)	2–1	FC Saverdun (10)

First round results: Midi-Pyrénées, District de l'Aveyron

Tie no	Home team (tier)	Score	Away team (tier)
1.	US Laissac Bertholène (10)	4–3	JS Lévézou (10)
2.	US Argence/Viadène (11)	1–4	US Espalion (10)
3.	US Pays Alzuréen (11)	1–0	Espoir FC 88 (9)
4.	Entente Villecomtal-Mouret-Pruines-Entraygues (11)	0–3	US Bas Rouergue (9)
5.	FC Villeneuvois/Diège (11)	0–3	SO Millau (9)
6.	Pareloup Céor FC (11)	1–3 (a.e.t.)	FC Monastère (9)
7.	US Montbazens (11)	1–1 (2–4 p)	Association St Laurentaise Cantonale Canourguaise (10)
8.	Inter de Causse Bezonnes (11)	1–3	Foot Vallon (9)
9.	FC Val d'Assou (11)	2–0	AS Aguessac (10)
10.	FC St Juéry (12)	0–1	FC Agen-Gages (10)
11.	AO Bozouls (11)	1–3	JS Bassin Aveyron (9)
12.	Entente Salles Curan/Curan (11)	1–3	AS Olemps (10)
13.	AS Vabraise (11)	1–2 (a.e.t.)	Entente St Georges/St Rome (9)
14.	AS St Geniez-d'Olt (12)	0–4	SC Sébazac (9)
15.	US Dourdou (11)	3–2	Entente Costecalde Lestrade Broquiès (10)
16.	Méridienne FC (11)	2–1	US Lapanouse-de-Sévérac (10)
17.	ASC Mahorais (12)	2–1	US Réquistanaise (10)

First round results: Midi-Pyrénées, District de Haute-Garonne Comminges

Tie no	Home team (tier)	Score	Away team (tier)
1.	Villeneuve FC (9)	1–3	FC Mabroc (10)
2.	Étoile Cagire (10)	0–10	ERCSO L'Isle-en-Dodon (8)
3.	Monastruc-de-Salies FC (11)	0–3	Pyrénées Sud Comminges (10)
4.	EFC Aurignac (9)	3–2 (a.e.t.)	Entente Boulogne-Péguilhan (8)
5.	Bagnères Luchon Sports (10)	1–0	Pointis-Inard OC (10)
6.	US Salies-du-Salat/Mane/St Martory (8)	5–1	US Encausse-Soueich-Ganties (10)
7.	Comminges St Gaudens (9)	3–1	UE Bossòst (10)

First round results: Midi-Pyrénées, District du Gers

Tie no	Home team (tier)	Score	Away team (tier)
1.	Sud Astarac 2010 (10)	4–0	Val D'Arros Adour (10)
2.	UA Vic-Fezensac (8)	2–2 (4–5 p)	FC Pavien (9)
3.	FC Castéra-Verduzan (11)	0–3 (Note: FC Castéra-Verduzan penalised for a technical infringement. Original scoreline 4–7)	FC L'Isle-Jourdain (9)
4.	US Aignanaise (10)	8–2	AS Ségoufielle (11)
5.	Ste Christie-Preignan AS (9)	3–0	ES Gimontoise (8)
6.	SC St Clar (10)	5–1	US Lectoure (11)
7.	AS Manciet (11)	0–3	Eauze FC (10)
8.	SC Solomiacais (10)	1–0	FC Vallée de l'Arrats (10)
9.	FC Risclois (11)	6–3	Rassemblement du Bas Armangnac FC (10)

First round results: Midi-Pyrénées, District des Hautes-Pyrénées

Tie no	Home team (tier)	Score	Away team (tier)
1.	Soues Cigognes FC (9)	4–0	FC des Nestes (9)
2.	FC Val d'Adour (10)	3–0	FC Ibos-Ossun (10)
3.	ASC Aureilhan (10)	3–4	UST Nouvelles Vauge (9)
4.	FC Plateau (10)	1–0	Boutons d'Or Ger (10)
5.	AS Argelès-Lavedan (9)	3–0	Horgues-Odos FC (10)
6.	ES Haut Adour (8)	1–4	Juillan OS (8)
7.	ASC Barbazan-Debat (10)	2–1	US Marquisat Bénac (11)
8.	Elan Pyrénéen Bazet-Bordères-Lagarde (9)	1–1 (5–4 p)	Entente Luz-Pierrefitte-Arrens (9)
9.	ES Guizerix-Puntous (9)	1–3 (a.e.t.)	Galan FC (10)

First round results: Midi-Pyrénées, District du Lot

Tie no	Home team (tier)	Score	Away team (tier)
1.	AS Causse Limargue (10)	5–0	Entente Ségala (10)
2.	FC Causse Sud (12)	0–4	FC Biars-Bretenoux (9)
3.	Uxello FC Capdenac (13)	1–3	FC Haut Quercy (10)
4.	Lapopoie Olympique (13)	0–8	Figeac Quercy (9)
5.	Élan Marivalois (9)	3–1	EB Lendou-Montcuq (10)
6.	AS Montcabrier (10)	2–0	Bouriane FC (10)
7.	Entente Haut Célé (10)	1–3	Entente Cajarc Cenevières (11)
8.	FC Bégoux-Arcambal (10)	3–1 (a.e.t.)	Puy-l'Évêque-Prayssac FC (9)
9.	FC Lalbenque-Fontanes (9)	5–0	ES St Germain (10)

First round results: Midi-Pyrénées, District du Tarn

Tie no	Home team (tier)	Score	Away team (tier)
1.	FC Labastide-de-Lévis (10)	4–0	Réalmont FC (12)
2.	AS Pampelonnaise (10)	0–3	FC Vignoble 81 (9)
3.	AS Lescurienne (10)	1–3	ASPTT Albi (9)
4.	Les Copains d'Abord (10)	2–4	US St Sulpice (9)
5.	Terrsac Albi FC (10)	3–4	US Gaillacois (9)
6.	AS Briatexte (11)	1–2	Cambounet FC (9)
7.	Fréjairolles-Cambon-Collines (12)	0–2	FC Castelnau-de-Lévis (10)
8.	Olympique Lautrec (10)	5–0	FC Lacaunais (9)
9.	Valence OF (11)	0–4	Dourgne-Viviers (9)
10.	La Mygale-Le Séquestre (10)	1–4	FC Graulhet (9)
11.	SO St Amantais (10)	1–1 (4–3 p)	Saïx-Sémalens FC (9)
12.	US Soualaise (12)	0–7	AS Giroussens (9)
13.	Sport Benfica Graulhet (10)	1–1 (3–5 p)	Roquecourbe FC (9)
14.	AS Vallée du Sor (10)	3–1	US Labruguièroise (9)

First round results: Midi-Pyrénées, District du Tarn-et-Garonne

Tie no	Home team (tier)	Score	Away team (tier)
1.	Stade Larrazet-Garganvillar (10)	3–2	La Nicolaite (10)
2.	Corbarieu OC (12)	2–6	Avenir Lavitois (10)
3.	Cazes Olympique (8)	2–0	FC Brulhois (10)
4.	Montauban AF (8)	3–2	EF Castelsarrasin-Moissac (9)
5.	FC Les 2 Ponts (10)	1–0	US Malause (10)
6.	AS Stéphanoise (10)	2–1 (a.e.t.)	SC Nègrepelisse (11)
7.	Coquelicots Montéchois FC (10)	2–1	FC Beaumontois (10)
8.	JS Meauzacaise (8)	3–4	AS Mas-Grenier (9)
9.	Stade Caussadais (11)	2–3	SC Lafrancaisain (9)
10.	AS Montricoux-Bruniquel (10)	0–3	AS Bressols (9)

First round results: Midi-Pyrénées, District de Haut-Garonne

Tie no	Home team (tier)	Score	Away team (tier)
1.	AS Mondonville (9)	7–1	AS Labarthe-sur-Lèze (9)
2.	AS Hersoise (11)	0–3	AS Izards (11)
3.	JS Cugnaux (8)	3–2	US Ramonville (8)
4.	JS Cintegabelle (9)	2–3	Inter FC (10)
5.	Confluent Lacroix-Saubens-Pinsaguel (11)	1–2 (a.e.t.)	Toulouse Rangueil FC (10)
6.	JS Carbonne (9)	3–0	FC Montastruc
7.	AS Flourens-Drémil-Lafage (12)	4–0	FC Venerque-Le Vernet (13)
8.	AS Lagardelle (10)	1–2	US Riveraine (12)
9.	AS Lavernose-Lherm-Mauzac (9)	2–3	Toulouse Football Compans Caffarelli (12)
10.	US Pouvourville (10)	4–2	EF Castelmaurou Verfeil (11)
11.	US Plaisance (9)	3–0	FC Fonbeauzard (10)
12.	US Auriacaise (10)	4–0	ESE St Jory (12)
13.	US Léguevin (10)	8–3	FC Escalquens (11)
14.	JE Toulousaine Croix-Daurade (12)	7–2	ES Miremontaise (11)
15.	Football Algérien Toulousain (12)	0–4	Lauragais FC (9)
16.	JS Auzielle-Lauzerville (13)	3–4	Toulouse Olympique Aviation Club (9)
17.	AO Cornebarrieu (12)	0–3	US Seysses-Frouzins (8)
18.	FC Mahorais Toulouse (12)	0–3 (Note: FC Mahorais Toulouse won the tie, but were penalised for fielding one or more ineligible players. RC Eaunes progressed to the next round.)	RC Eaunes (11)
19.	Bruguières SC (11)	3–2	AS Toulouse Lardenne (11)

=== Normandie ===
These matches were played on 21 and 28 August 2016.

First round results: Normandie

Tie no	Home team (tier)	Score	Away team (tier)
1.	ASPTT Rouen (11)	2–1	Entente Motteville/Croix-Mare (11)
2.	FC Barentinois (10)	3–0	US Grammont (10)
3.	ASC Toussaint (11)	1–11	US Cap de Caux (10)
4.	AS Routot (11)	2–0	FC Le Trai-Duclair (9)
5.	FC Nord Ouest (12)	3–0	Yerville FC (10)
6.	US Ouainville (12)	1–4	Parc-d'Anxtot (12)
7.	FC Sommery (11)	2–2 (9–8 p)	CA Longuevillais (10)
8.	AC Beuzeville (10)	1–3	AS St Vigor-d'Ymonville (11)
9.	EF Elbeuf (11)	2–1	AS Ailly-Fontaine-Bellenger (12)
10.	Stade Grande Quevilly (10)	0–3	FC Val de Risle (10)
11.	AL Tourville-la-Rivière (11)	2–3	AS Val-de-Reuil/Vaudreuil/Poses (10)
12.	Grand-Couronne FC (11)	0–7	FAC Alizay (11)
13.	FCI Bel Air (11)	3–1	Gainneville AC (9)
14.	FC Limésy (11)	1–2 (a.e.t.)	FC Roumois Nord (10)
15.	US Houppeville (10)	4–1	US Mesnil-Esnard/Franqueville (9)
16.	Olympique Darnétal (10)	3–0	Rouen Sapins FC Grand-Mare (9)
17.	AS Canton d'Argueil (11)	0–3	AS Gournay-en-Bray (9)
18.	AC Bray Est (11)	1–4	ASC Jiyan Kurdistan (10)
19.	AS Ste Adresse But (10)	2–1	SC Octevillais (9)
20.	ESI St Antoine (11)	0–2	FC Gruchet-le-Valasse (10)
21.	Le Havre FC 2012 (10)	1–2	SS Gournay (9)
22.	US St Martin-du-Manoir (11)	1–4	RC Havrais (9)
23.	AS Beuzeville-la-Grenier (11)	0–2	US Godervillais (9)
24.	Athleti'Caux FC (10)	5–2	US Épouville (9)
25.	US Les Loges (11)	3–1	ES Pointe de Caux (12)
26.	FC Bailly-en-Rivière (11)	0–2	US Normande 76 (11)
27.	US Auppegard	0–3	US Envermeu (11)
28.	FC Tôtes (10)	3–4	US Doudeville (11)
29.	FC Biville-la-Baignarde (11)	2–3 (a.e.t.)	Amicale Joseph Caulle (10)
30.	US Londinières (11)	2–5	AS Mesnières-en-Bray (9)
31.	US Crielloise (11)	2–0	ES Janval (11)
32.	AS Tréport (10)	2–3	ES Arques (9)
33.	St Aubin UFC (12)	6–1	US Bouvaincourt-sur-Bresle (10)
34.	AS Ouvillaise (10)	2–5	AS Ourville (9)
35.	Stade Valeriquais (10)	2–1 (a.e.t.)	Entente Falaises (10)
36.	GS Foucarmont-Réalcamp (12)	0–3	FC Ventois (11)
37.	FC Copains d'Abord (14)	3–0	RC Pontois (12)
38.	ES Tourville (10)	1–0	US Bacqueville-Pierreville (9)
39.	ES Étoutteville-Yvecrique (11)	1–3	US Héricourt-en-Caux (10)
40.	ES Aumaloise (10)	2–2 (3–1 p)	FC Neufchâtel (9)
41.	CO Fontaine-le-Dun (15)	2–6	ASC Bourg-Dun (11)
42.	US Auffay (11)	10–2	FC Petit Caux (10)
43.	US St Laurentaise (13)	1–3	FC Fréville-Bouville SIVOM (10)
44.	AJ Angiens	0–3	US Grèges (11)
45.	AS Andrésienne (13)	3–0	FC Garennes-Bueil-La Couture-Breuilpoint (11)
46.	CS Lyonsais (14)	2–0	US Étrépagny (12)
47.	US St Aubin-le-Vertueux (13)	0–1	SC Thiberville (11)
48.	AS St Élier (13)	1–2	AS Vallée de l'Andelle (11)
49.	FC Ézy-sur-Eure (13)	0–3 (a.e.t.)	CS Ivry-la-Bataille (11)
50.	SC Bernay (12)	1–4	FC Serquigny-Nassandres (9)
51.	Stade Vernolien (11)	3–5	FC Illiers-l'Évêque (10)
52.	US Cormelles-Lieurey (12)	1–3	CS Beaumont-le-Roger (10)
53.	US St Germain-la-Campagne (12)	3–3 (4–3 p)	FC Plasnes (13)
54.	AS Cantonale La Charentonne (12)	0–3	AS Fidelaire-Ferrière (11)
55.	ES Claville (12)	3–0	Lusitanos Navarre (10)
56.	JA Évreux (14)	0–3	FC Avrais Nonancourt (9)
57.	FC Harcourt (12)	0–3	AL St Michel Évreux (11)
58.	ES Damville (12)	0–3	US Lyroise (10)
59.	FC Vexin Sud (12)	0–2	Club Andelle Pîtres (10)
60.	SC Breteuil-Francheville (12)	4–3	AS Hondouville (10)
61.	FC Eure Madrie Seine (10)	0–5	CS Andelys (9)
62.	JS Arnières (11)	0–2	ES Normanville (9)
63.	La Croix Vallée d'Eure (11)	2–3 (a.e.t.)	St Sébastien Foot (9)
64.	US Conches (11)	2–1	US Rugles (9)
65.	FA Roumois (11)	1–2	US Vatteville Brotonne (12)
66.	Entente Vienne et Saâne (11)	1–0	Neuville AC (10)

=== Aquitaine ===
These matches were played on 27 and 28 August 2016.

First round results: Aquitaine

Tie no	Home team (tier)	Score	Away team (tier)
1.	Seignosse-Capbreton-Soutsons FC (9)	5–1	Les Labourdins d'Ustaritz (9)
2.	JA Dax (9)	2–3	JAB Pau (9)
3.	Marensin FC (10)	6–0	AS Bidache Sport (12)
4.	Peyrehorade SF (11)	0–8	Hasparren FC (9)
5.	AS Bretagne-de-Marsan (11)	3–1	ES Bournos-Doumy-Garlède (10)
6.	Entente Haut Béarn (11)	3–5	Bleuets Pau (8)
7.	AS Lous Marous (11)	3–6 (a.e.t.)	AS Mazères-Uzos-Rontignon (9)
8.	Association Saint Laurent Billère (9)	2–2 (5–6 p)	AS Pontonx (9)
9.	Ardanavy FC (11)	0–1 (a.e.t.)	FC La Ribère (9)
10.	Carresse Salies FC (11)	4–4 (3–0 p)	CA Morcenx (10)
11.	Gars d'Albret Labrit (10)	3–3 (9–8 p)	AS Eglantins Hendaye (10)
12.	Cocarde OS St Laurent-Médoc (11)	0–3	ES Bruges (8)
13.	AS St Aubin-de-Médoc (10)	4–2	US Ludonnaise (11)
14.	Landes Girondines FC (10)	0–2	AS Taillan (9)
15.	AS Pointe du Médoc (8)	1–1 (4–2 p)	SJ Macaudaise (8)
16.	FC Médoc Atlantique (11)	1–7	FC Medoc Ocean (9)
17.	Andernos Sport FC (9)	2–1	Stade Pauillacais FC (10)
18.	FC Lesparre Médoc (10)	1–5	CA St Hélène (8)
19.	AS Le Haillan (11)	2–2 (5–4 p)	FC Belin-Béliet (9)
20.	AS Avensan-Moulis-Listrac (11)	0–6	AS Facture-Biganos Boïens (9)
21.	JS Teichoise (9)	0–1	FC Hourtin-Naujac (10)
22.	ES Audenge (8)	2–0	FC Arsac-Pian Médoc (9)
23.	AS Beautiran (11)	4–1	CMO Bassens (9)
24.	CA Sallois (10)	6–1	SC Cabanac Villagrains (12)
25.	FC Barpais (10)	2–3 (a.e.t.)	Bordeaux AC (11)
26.	AS Sauveterrienne (11)	1–3	Sp Chantecler Bordeaux Nord-le-Lac (11)
27.	US Illadaise (10)	4–1	SJ Yvrac (12)
28.	AS Chambéry (12)	4–5	AS Montferrand Football (12)
29.	FC Cubnezais (12)	0–6	SC Cadaujac (10)
30.	SC Laruscade (12)	3–3 (2–4 p)	Bouliacaise FC (12)
31.	CA Carbon Blanais (10)	5–1	AS Lusitanos Cenon (10)
32.	FC Pays Beaumontois (11)	5–2	FC St Maurinois (12)
33.	FC Faux (10)	1–3	US La Catte (8)
34.	RC Laurence (10)	0–3	FC Cendrieux-La Douze (11)
35.	US Bachelière (13)	0–4	AS Gensac-Montcaret (9)
36.	AS Portugais Sarlat (11)	2–3 (a.e.t.)	AS Rouffignac-Plazac (9)
37.	FC La Ménaurie (12)	0–2	FC Terrasson (10)
38.	US St Geniès-Archignac-Aubareil (11)	1–2	ES Montignacoise (10)
39.	FC Belvesois (12)	0–6	AF Casseneuil-Pailloles-Lédat (10)
40.	Confluent Football 47 (10)	1–2	US Port Ste Marie-Feugarolles (10)
41.	Entente Boé Bon-Encontre (9)	4–0	Bordeaux Étudiants CF (9)
42.	FC Gradignan (11)	2–1	CA Béglais (9)
43.	Tonneins FC (9)	0–1	CM Floirac (8)
44.	Avenir Toulennais (12)	0–9	Sud Gironde FC (11)
45.	SC Aresien (11)	5–3	Joyeuse Savignac (11)
46.	SC Bastidienne (10)	3–2	CA Castets-en-Dorthe (11)
47.	SC Astaffortais (11)	0–1	CS Portugais Villenave-d'Ornon (9)
48.	AGJA Caudéran (9)	3–1	FC Pessac Alouette (8)
49.	Les Bleuets Macariens (11)	1–2	SC Monségur (11)
50.	CS Lantonnais (10)	3–1	US Lamothe-Mongauzy (11)
51.	SA Mauléonais (9)	2–0	FC Hagetmautien (9)
52.	Pardies Olympique (8)	2–0	FC Lons (9)
53.	Union St Maurice-Grenade (11)	0–3	AS Tarnos (10)
54.	Espérance Oeyreluy (12)	1–5	AS Artix (9)
55.	Ciboure FC (13)	2–4	FC Vallée de l'Ousse (10)
56.	Labenne OSC (10)	0–3 (Note: Labenne OSC penalised for fielding suspended players. Original result 4–2)	SA St Severin (9)
57.	Étoile Béarnais FC (9)	0–0 (2–4 p)	US St Michel Arudy (10)
58.	FREP St Vincent-de-Paul (11)	7–2	US Castétis-Gouze (10)
59.	Monein FC (12)	1–2	Chalosse FC (11)
60.	FC St Laurent d'Arce/St Gervais (10)	3–2	ES Ambares (9)
61.	US Galgonnaise (10)	3–1	Montpon-Ménesplet FC (8)
62.	JS Bersonnaise (11)	2–4	Targon-Soulignac FC (9)
63.	Union St Bruno (9)	9–0	FC Beguey Cadillac (10)
64.	FCC Créonnais (10)	2–11	FC St André-de-Cubzac (8)
65.	US Farguaise (10)	1–3	AS Pugnacaise (10)
66.	US Bouscataise (9)	4–4 (1–3 p)	US Mussidan-St Medard (9)
67.	US Nord Gironde (11)	3–5 (a.e.t.)	CA Ribéracois (10)
68.	FC Loubesien (10)	2–1 (a.e.t.)	FC Pays Mareuil (9)
69.	CA Brantômais (10)	3–1	AS Pays Granitique (11)
70.	FC Coteaux Libournais (9)	3–0	St Sulpice Jeunesse (11)
71.	US St Denis-de-Pile (10)	3–1	Tour Sportive Merles Blanc (11)
72.	US Tocane-St Apre (11)	2–5	La Thibérienne (9)
73.	JS Castellevequoise (10)	1–3	AS Antonne-Le Change (8)
74.	US Lagorce (12)	4–4 (4–2 p)	JS St Christophe-de-Double (11)
75.	US Coutras (10)	1–2	Joyeuse St Sulpice-et-Cameyrac (10)
76.	USC Léognan (12)	1–2	ASSA Pays du Dropt (9)
77.	Montesquieu FC (9)	3–1	AS Marcellus-Cocumont (9)
78.	FC Gironde La Réole (10)	2–1	AS Miramont-Lavergne (10)
79.	US Cenon Rive Droite (9)	0–1	USJ St Augustin Club Pyrénées Aquitaine (10)
80.	Stade Pessacais UC (11)	0–3	Vaillante Sportive Caudrot (9)
81.	CA Pondaurat (9)	4–2	FC Coteaux Bourgeais (9)
82.	RC Chambéry (10)	3–2	FC Coteaux Bordelais (9)
83.	AS Villandraut-Préchac (10)	3–0	ES Mazères-Roaillan (10)
84.	Patronage Bazadais (10)	3–2	US Virazeil-Puymiclan (10)
85.	SC Daussois Omnisport (11)	1–6	Limens FC (9)
86.	AS Neuvic St Léon (10)	3–1	Les Dragons Astériens (10)
87.	CS Léguillac (12)	2–3	ES Cours-de-Pile (12)
88.	St Seurin JC (8)	2–2 (3–4 p)	AS Nontron-St Pardoux (9)
89.	US Creysse-Lembras (11)	3–0	AS Coteaux Dordogne (9)
90.	AS Pays de Montaigne et Gurçon (10)	5–3	AS Castillonnès-Cahuzac-Lalandusse (10)
91.	US Chancelade (11)	2–3	Périgueux Foot (11)
92.	Pays de l'Eyraud (11)	2–3 (a.e.t.)	Les Aiglons Razacois (10)
93.	FA Bourbaki Pau (9)	2–2 (5–4 p)	FC Nérac (9)
94.	ES Montoise (9)	4–0	FC Pierroton-Cestas-Toctoucau (10)
95.	FC Espagnol Pau (10)	1–4	US Roquefort (9)
96.	Fraternelle Landiras (11)	2–2 (3–4 p)	FC des Enclaves et du Plateau (11)
97.	FC Casteljaloux (11)	3–0	SC Arthez-Lacq-Audéjos (10)
98.	SC St Symphorien (10)	2–1	AL Poey-de-Lescar (11)
99.	US St Medard CU (10)	3–1	Mas AC (9)
100.	Union Jurançonnaise (11)	3–0	FC Born (10)
101.	US Vaillante Gelosienne (11)	0–1	US Portugais Pau (9)
102.	SC Taron-Sévignacq (12)	0–2	FC Doazit (9)

=== Atlantique ===
These matches were played on 27 and 28 August 2016.

First round results: Atlantique

Tie no	Home team (tier)	Score	Away team (tier)
1.	AS St Mesmin (12)	1–0	FCPB L'Hermenault (9)
2.	Orvault RC (11)	0–2	FC Mouzeil-Teillé-Ligné (9)
3.	AFC Bouin-Bois-de-Céné-Châteauneuf (12)	2–1	Eclair de Chauvé (13)
4.	AS Brivet (11)	3–3 (3–4 p)	JA St Mars-du-Désert (9)
5.	Anjou Baconne FC (12)	1–3	AS Mésanger (12)
6.	RS Teiphalien Tiffauges (10)	0–2	ES Pineaux (10)
7.	FC Noirmoutier (11)	1–7	FC Bouaye (9)
8.	St Pierre SF La Guyonnière (12)	0–7	ES Marais (10)
9.	Aiglons Durtalois (11)	3–2	FC Pellouailles-Corze (9)
10.	Legé FC (11)	1–2	Pornic Foot (9)
11.	Océane FC (12)	2–1	FC Bouaine Rocheservière (10)
12.	ES Tourlandry-Vezins-Chanteloup (12)	0–0 (3–5 p)	AS Longeron-Torfou (11)
13.	JF Cholet (11)	1–1 (4–2 p)	Réveil St Géréon (10)
14.	AS Sion Lusanger (12)	1–0	SC Ste Gemmes-d'Andigné (10)
15.	Nantes Sud 98 (12)	1–4	FC Sud Sèvre et Maine (10)
16.	FC Oudon-Couffé (12)	1–3	EA La Tessoualle (9)
17.	AS Guillaumois (12)	2–2 (5–3 p)	Fc Côte Sauvage (10)
18.	FC Logne et Boulogne (13)	0–2	US Suplice André Mormaison (10)
19.	Landreau-Loroux OSC (11)	4–0	FC Bécon-St Augustin (9)
20.	FC Pierretardière (13)	1–4	JF St Prouant-Monsireigne (11)
21.	FC Estuaire Paimboeuf (12)	0–8	St Joachim Brière Sports (11)
22.	FC Entente du Vignoble (11)	1–3	FC Val de Moine (11)
23.	FC La Génétouze (10)	1–2	AS Sud Loire (9)
24.	JS Brion (13)	0–2	Entente St Lambert des Levées (12)
25.	Arche FC (12)	2–1 (a.e.t.)	US Ste Reigne-de-Bretagne (11)
26.	Étoile du Don Moisdon-Meilleraye (11)	0–8	JGE Sucé-sur-Erdre (9)
27.	FC St Lambert-St Jean-St Léger-St Martin (12)	0–5	US Varades (10)
28.	USE Dompierroise (10)	4–3 (a.e.t.)	US Bazoges Beaurepaire (11)
29.	Andrezé-Jub-Jallais FC (10)	1–1 (6–5 p)	AS Le-Puy-St Bonnet (11)
30.	UMPF St Nazaire (11)	1–3	FC Bourgneuf-en-Retz (12)
31.	Pomjeannais JA (10)	0–2	St André-St Macaire FC (10)
32.	Étoile Mouzillon Foot (11)	2–1 (a.e.t.)	AS Landais (9)
33.	ES Longevillaise (11)	3–0	Commequiers SF (12)
34.	SSJA St Mathurin (13)	0–1	FC Retz (10)
35.	FC Trois Rivières (11)	0–3	Nozay OS (9)
36.	FC Chaudron-St Quentin (12)	1–2	Hirondelle Football (9)
37.	AS Givrand (12)	2–2 (4–5 p)	ASR Machecoul (9)
38.	ASD Noyantais (12)	1–10	Montreuil-Juigné BF (10)
39.	US St Georges-sur-Loire (12)	1–4	AS Ponts-de-Cé (10)
40.	St Herblain OC (11)	0–5	Stade Couëronnais FC (12)
41.	AS St Maxient-sur-Vie (12)	0–1	St Pierre Sportif Nieul-le-Dolent (10)
42.	JA Villemoisan (11)	4–3	AS St Pierre Angrie (12)
43.	FC Paulx (13)	0–8	US Bernardière-Cugand (10)
44.	US Toutlemonde Maulévrier (11)	5–1 (a.e.t.)	ÉS Trélazé (9)
45.	US Landeronde-St Georges (12)	0–4	US Bournezeau-St Hilaire (10)
46.	FC Chabossière (10)	5–0	Savenay-Malville FC (11)
47.	US Pellerinaise (13)	2–1	Petit-Mars FC (11)
48.	US Soudan (10)	1–3	ES Gavraise (11)
49.	FC La Montagne (10)	2–1	AC St Brevin (9)
50.	Don Bosco Football Nantes (12)	0–1	Donges FC (10)
51.	ES La Copechagnière (11)	1–2	US Chauché (9)
52.	St Venant SF (9)	0–0 (5–4 p)	AC Longué (10)
53.	AS Genêts d'Or (12)	0–3	St Pierre Mazières (10)
54.	Abbaretz-Saffré FC (11)	2–1	AEPR Rezé (9)
55.	Val de Sèvre Football (9)	2–3	Christophe-Séguinière (10)
56.	Amicale St Lyphard (12)	2–5	ES Maritime (9)
57.	USC Corné (12)	2–1	AS Valanjou (12)
58.	FC St Laurent Malvent (10)	0–1	EF Cheffois-St Maurice (9)
59.	St Marc Football (11)	3–1	ES Notre-Dame-des-Landes (12)
60.	SC Nord Atlantique (10)	5–0	FC Nyoiseau/Bouillé-Ménard/Grugé-l'Hôpital (11)
61.	AF Trémentines (12)	2–1	AC Angers Hauts de St Aubin (12)
62.	US Autize Vendée (11)	1–0 (a.e.t.)	Foot Espoir 85 (10)
63.	AS Landevieille (11)	3–4	ES St Denis-la-Chevasse (9)
64.	St Sebastie Boussay (13)	2–2 (2–3 p)	FC Loulaysien (10)
65.	Espérance Crossac (11)	3–1	US St Aubin-des-Châteaux (12)
66.	AS St Sylvain-d'Anjou (11)	3–0	AS Seiches-sur-le-Loire-Marcé (9)
67.	FC La Garnache (12)	1–2	FC Goelands Sanmaritains (12)
68.	ASR Vernantes-Vernoil (11)	0–2	ES Val Baugeois (12)
69.	AS Bruffière Defontaine (11)	0–3	Bé-Léger FC (12)
70.	AOS Pontchâteau (11)	1–3	La Saint André (9)
71.	US Bugallière Orvault (12)	2–3	Sympho Foot Treillières (10)
72.	ES Layon (10)	0–1	SomloirYzernay CPF (9)
73.	US Gétigné (11)	1–5	FC Brennois Boiséen (9)
74.	FC Bout' Loire-et-Evre (13)	2–4	FC Fief Gesté (11)
75.	St Gilles-St Hilaire FC (11)	1–3	Ste Foy FC (11)
76.	ES Belleville-sur-Vie (11)	2–5 (a.e.t.)	FC Grand Lieu (10)
77.	SC Avessac-Fégréac (12)	4–1	FC Fay Bouvron (12)
78.	AL Couëts Bougenais (11)	0–1 (a.e.t.)	ES Belligné-Chapelle-Maumusson (9)
79.	AS Maine (11)	1–2	CCS Nantes St Félix (12)
80.	EV Le Fenouiller (12)	2–4	ASC St Médard-de-Doulon Nantes(9)
81.	Olympique Ste Gemms-sur-Loire (11)	0–2	FC Laurentais Landemontais (9)
82.	Le Cellier Mauves FC (12)	2–0	ES Vertou (11)
83.	St Sébastien Profondine (12)	3–0	US St Étienne-Palluau-La Chapelle Palluau (11)
84.	RS Les Clouzeaux (10)	0–3	FC Jard-Avrillé (9)
85.	EM Sallertaine (13)	2–1	SC Apremont (12)
86.	FC Nieul-Maillezais-Les Autises (11)	2–3 (a.e.t.)	Pays de Chantonnay Foot (10)
87.	RC Doué-la-Fontaine (10)	5–2	EA Baugeois (11)
88.	St Joseph de Porterie Nantes (10)	2–0	St Georges FC (9)
89.	FC Portguais Cholet (11)	2–0	Gaubretière-St Martin FC (12)
90.	USM Beauvoir-sur-Mer (11)	6–1	US Chapeloise (13)
91.	US Les Epesses-St Mars (10)	2–3	Energie Le May-sur-Èvre (9)
92.	US Briolletaine (11)	3–3 (1–3 p)	ES Aubance (10)
93.	Union St Leger-St Germain-Champtocé (11)	1–0	Nantes St Pierre (9)
94.	Ste Christine Bourgneuf FC (13)	1–3	AS La Salle-Coron (11)
95.	ES La Romagne-Roussay (11)	1–2	FC Chavagnes-La Rabatelière (11)
96.	Réveil St Aubinois (11)	3–7	RS Ardelay (9)
97.	ASPTT-CAEB Cholet (9)	3–0	AS St Hilaire-Vihiers-St Paul (9)
98.	AS Chazé-Vern (11)	1–1 (3–4 p)	ES La Pouëze (10)
99.	Amicale Dolaysienne (12)	1–2	ES Dresny-Plessé (10)
100.	ASC St Barthélémy-d'Anjou (11)	1–1 (3–2 p)	US Cantenay-Épinard (9)
101.	Châtelais FC (11)	1–0	ES Andard-Brain (9)
102.	FC Cantonal Sud Vendée (12)	2–0	US Champ St Père (12)
103.	AS La Madeleine (11)	2–1	FC Immaculée (10)
104.	AS Dom-Tom (12)	1–4 (a.e.t.)	US Herminoise (10)
105.	USJA St Martin-Aviré-Louvaine (12)	1–0	Espérance Campbon (11)
106.	La Panafricaine FC (13)	0–1	St Michel SF (12)
107.	ES Loire et Louet (11)	0–4	Olympique Liré-Drain (9)
108.	FC Sud Vilaine (11)	2–1 (a.e.t.)	AS Grandchamp Foot (13)
109.	FC Falleron-Froidfond (11)	1–4	FC Toutes Aides Nantes (12)
110.	FC Castel-Fiacrais (10)	4–2	FC Généraudière Roche Sud (10)
111.	FC St Philbert-Réorthe-Jaudonnière (12)	0–2	SA St Florent-des-Bois (11)
112.	US Michelaise et Triolaise (11)	2–1	ES Château-d'Olonne (11)
113.	ES Haute Goulaine (12)	2–2 (3–4 p)	FC Fuilet-Chaussaire (10)
114.	FC Castelvarennais (12)	0–5	Football Chalonnes-Chaudefonds (10)
115.	ES Vallet (12)	0–1	CAS Possosavennières (10)
116.	US Ferrièroise (12)	3–5	Etoile de Clisson (9)
117.	Jeunes d'Erbray (10)	1–3	ES Blain (9)
118.	FC Talmondais (10)	1–2	LS Ste Flaive des Loups (11)
119.	FC Cécilien Martinoyen (10)	2–0	ES St Georges-des-Gardes (9)
120.	RS Boupérien (11)	0–2	FC Mouchamps-Rochetrejoux (9)
121.	ARC Tillières (12)	0–0 (4–5 p)	FF Mortagne-sur-Sèvre (11)
122.	St Cyr Foot Herbignac (11)	0–1	CS Montoirin (9)
123.	FC Layon (12)	1–2	US Maze (10)
124.	St Vincent LUSTVI (11)	3–2	AS Loroux Béconnais (11)
125.	SS Antigny-St Maurice-des-Noues (11)	0–2	FC3M (11)
126.	Entente Sud Vendée (11)	1–0	AS Sigournaisienne Germinoise (12)
127.	FC Mesnilaurentais (12)	4–2	Club du Haut Lyon (11)
128.	US Marans (11)	1–3	AC Belle-Bielle (12)
129.	ES du Lac (12)	1–3	Coëx Olympique (10)
130.	Écureils des Pays de Monts (9)	3–6	Stade Olonnais (9)
131.	Amicale Beignon-Basset (12)	0–3	US Aubigny (9)
132.	FC Ingrandes-Le Fresne (11)	1–0	CO St Mars-la-Jaille (11)
133.	FC Guémené-Massérac (12)	2–0	FC Stephanois (12)
134.	Hermitage Venansault (12)	1–1 (5–4 p)	AS St Gervais (12)
135.	JF Boissière-des-Landes (12)	1–4	ES Grosbreuil (10)
136.	FC Herblanetz (12)	0–2	AS Lac de Maine (10)
137.	Etoile du Bocage (12)	1–2	Herbadilla Foot (11)
138.	AS Marsacais (12)	3–0	Les Touches FC (12)
139.	UF Allones-Brain-sur-Allones (12)	3–5	ASVR Ambillou-Château (11)
140.	CP Assérac (13)	1–2	US Vital Frossay (12)
141.	JS du Layon (12)	4–1	FC Villedieu-La Renaudière (13)
142.	Héric FC (12)	0–7	ES Pornichet (9)
143.	US Combrée-Bel-Air-Noyant (11)	2–2 (1–3 p)	CA Voubantais/US Glainoise (11)
144.	St Médard St Mars-de-Coutais (13)	1–0	Espérance St Yves Nantes (13)
145.	Etoile du Cens (12)	0–2	Métallo Sport Chantenaysien (9)
146.	FC Villevêque-Soucelles (12)	2–0	AS Salle-Aubry-Poitevinière (12)
147.	St Melaine OS (11)	1–4	Doutre SC (11)
148.	ES Le Puy-Vaudelnay (12)	7–1	ES Gennes-Les Rosiers (12)
149.	ES Montilliers (11)	0–0 (4–3 p)	ES Varennes-Villebernier (10)
150.	St Martin Treize Septiers (12)	1–4	FC St Julien-Vairé (10)

=== Méditerranée ===
These matches were played on 27 and 28 August 2016.

First round results: Méditerranée

Tie no	Home team (tier)	Score	Away team (tier)
1.	SC Vinon-Durance (8)	1–3	CA Digne 04 (8)
2.	Stade Transian (9)	1–0	SO Londais (8)
3.	ES Contoise (9)	0–4	US Plan de Grasse (8)
4.	FC Vidauban (9)	4–1	AS Mar Vivo (9)
5.	ES Aups-Régusse (10)	3–0	FC Pays de Fayence (9)
6.	US ViVo 04 (8)	0–2	US Les Mées (8)
7.	FC Céreste-Reillanne (8)	2–4	EP Manosque (8)
8.	AS Valensole Gréoux (9)	6–3	AS Embrun (8)
9.	US Veynoise SNCF (8)	4–0	US Châteauneuf-Aubignosc-Peipin (9)
10.	FC Beausoleil (10)	0–1	AS Fontonne (8)
11.	OC Blausasc (11)	2–7	FC Antibes (8)
12.	FC Mougins Côte d'Azur (8)	1–2	CJ Antibes (8)
13.	ASPTT Nice (11)	0–2	US Biot (11)
14.	AS Roquefort (10)	1–2	AS Roquebrune-Cap-Martin (8)
15.	Entente St Sylvestre Nice Nord (8)	4–1	US Cannes Bocca Olympique (8)
16.	ES Baous (9)	2–1	AS Vence (8)
17.	SO Roquettan (12)	1–10	FC Carros (8)
18.	St Paul CO Collois (11)	2–3 (a.e.t.)	EC Madeleine Victorine (10)
19.	Étoile Menton (11)	1–1 (4–5 p)	ES Haute-Siagne (11)
20.	FC Villefranchois (9)	0–3	US Valbonne Sophia Antipolis (9)
21.	Stade Laurentin (9)	1–0 (a.e.t.)	Trinité Sport Football Club (8)
22.	AS Traminots Alpes Maritimes (11)	1–0	Drap Football (11)
23.	US Farenque (10)	3–3 (5–6 p)	AAS Val St André (9)
24.	FC Istres Rassuen (9)	2–3	ES Milloise (9)
25.	AS Ste Marguerite (11)	0–6	Luynes Sports (8)
26.	JS Pennes Mirabeau (9)	3–0 (Note: Six-Fours Le Brusc FC were penalised for a technical infringement and JS Pennes Mirabeau progressed to the second round. The original scoreline was 2–3)	Six-Fours Le Brusc FC (8)
27.	ASC Vivaux Sauvagère (10)	2–7	Étoile Huveaune (9)
28.	Olympique Mallemortais (10)	3–0	AS Bouc Bel Air (10)
29.	FC St Victoret (11)	0–3	ASCJ Félix Pyat (9)
30.	JO St Gabriel (10)	2–1	Pays d'Aix FC (9)
31.	SC Montredon Bonneveine (8)	2–0	AS Busserine (8)
32.	FO Ventabren (9)	2–3	ES Salin de Giraud (11)
33.	ES Bassin Minier (11)	1–2	FC Septèmes (9)
34.	SO Cassis (10)	3–0	US Éguillenne (10)
35.	US Trets (10)	5–4	FC St Mitre-les-Ramparts (10)
36.	FC Chateauneuf-les-Martigues (10)	1–0	AS Simiane-Collongue (9)
37.	AS Mazargues (9)	1–1 (3–5 p)	AS Étoile du Sud (8)
38.	FC La Soude (10)	3–1	SC St Martinois (10)
39.	USPEG Marseille (10)	11–1	SC St Cannat (10)
40.	COC Amicale St Just (9)	4–0	JS Istreenne (10)
41.	St Henri FC (10)	1–2	FSC La Ciotat (9)
42.	AS Vallon des Tuves / FC Savinoise (9)	6–2	JS St Julien (9)
43.	CA Croix Sainte (10)	2–3 (a.e.t.)	US Venelles (9)
44.	ARAM Marseille	0–3	CA Plan-de-Cuques (8)
45.	FC La Ciotat-Ceyreste (10)	4–2	Burel FC (10)
46.	AS Rognac (8)	1–3	AS Martigues Sud (8)
47.	US Thoroise (11)	1–0	EJGC Graveson (10)
48.	Étoile d'Aubune (9)	0–4	Boxland Club Islois (8)
49.	FC Aureille (11)	0–3	US Eygalières (9)
50.	SC Orange (9)	1–2	ARC Cavaillon (9)
51.	AS Piolençoise (10)	0–3	USR Pertuis (10)
52.	Olympique Montelais (9)	2–4	Olympic Barbentane (8)
53.	FC Bonnieux (12)	0–5	ES Pierredon Mouriès (10)
54.	AS Violès (9)	0–1	Olympique Novais (8)
55.	Espérance Gordienne (12)	2–1	JS Lourmarin (10)
56.	US Entraigues (9)	0–4	AS Camaretois (9)
57.	Nyons FC (8)	1–1 (5–4 p)	FC Carpentras (8)
58.	US Autre Provence (10)	7–1	US Mirabellaise (12)
59.	Avenir Club Avignonnais (11)	2–1	AS Rasteau (9)
60.	US St Didier (9)	2–0	SC Gadagnien (9)
61.	RC Provence (9)	1–5	FA Châteaurenard (9)
62.	Entente St Jean du Gres (9)	4–2	US Avignonnais (8)
63.	Calavon FC (9)	0–4	Espérance Sorguaise (9)
64.	FC Luberon (9)	1–0	Tarascon FC (8)
65.	FCAS Drôme-Provence (10)	2–1	US Valreas (10)
66.	US Lapalud (10)	1–3	SC Jonquières (9)
67.	SC Montfavet (8)	0–0 (3–2 p)	AC Port-de-Bouc (8)
68.	AS Brignoles (10)	1–7	FC Grimaud (10)
69.	FC Ramatuelle (8)	1–2 (a.e.t.)	SC Cogolin (9)
70.	FC Rocbaron (10)	3–1	CA Cannetois (10)
71.	SC Tourves-Rougiers (9)	6–2	Étoile Claret Montéty
72.	ES Solliès-Farlède (9)	2–3	SO Lavandou (9)
73.	ES Lorguaise (9)	2–3	US St Mandrier (8)
74.	JS Beaussetanne (9)	1–2	AS Estérel (8)
75.	ASC Jonquet Les Routes (9)	0–5	FC Pugetois (8)
76.	FCUS Tropézienne (8)	5–1	FC Seynois (9)
77.	Olympique St Maximinois (8)	4–2	US Pradet (9)
78.	US Caderousse (10)	1–0	Dentelles FC (9)
79.	Montet Bornala Club Nice (9)	3–0	Racines Cap Vert (10)
80.	FC Euro African Nice (11)	0–3	US Pegomas (8)
81.	AS Roya (12)	0–3	ES Villeneuve-Loubet (10)
82.	Aix Université CF (11)	0–3	AS Forcalquier (8)
83.	Olympique Avignonnais	0–3	Stade Maillanais (8)
84.	ES Boulbon (8)	0–3	AC Vedene (8)
85.	FC Lauris	0–3	US St Saturninoise (11)
86.	Bormes Mimomas Sports (9)	3–0	FC Belgentier (11)

=== Nord-Pas de Calais ===
These matches were played on 28 August 2016.

First round results: Nord-Pas de Calais

Tie no	Home team (tier)	Score	Away team (tier)
1.	US Mondicourt (14)	1–3	Olympique Heninois (13)
2.	US Izel-lès-Équerchin (15)	4–1	SC Aubinois (15)
3.	SCF Achicourt (15)	1–0	AS Frévent (12)
4.	Intrépides Norrent-Fontes (14)	3–1	FC Hersin (13)
5.	US Maisnil (14)	1–4	ES Labeuvrière (10)
6.	AS Bapaume-Bertincourt-Vaulx-Vraucourt (13)	2–2 (4–5 p)	JS Écourt-St Quentin (11)
7.	AS Vallée de la Ternoise (14)	1–2 (a.e.t.)	Sud Artois (12)
8.	US Auchelloise Jeune (13)	1–1 (4–3 p)	FC Lillers (12)
9.	USO Drocourt (13)	2–4	ES Haisnes (12)
10.	AS Bailleul-Sir-Berthoult (13)	0–4	AG Grenay (11)
11.	ASC Camblain-l'Abbé (13)	5–2	ES Éleu (12)
12.	US Monchy-au-Bois (12)	void (Note: US Monchy-au-Bois penalised for fielding an unregistered player. US Rouvroy penalised for fielding a suspended player. Both sides eliminated. The original scoreline was 3–2)	US Rouvroy (11)
13.	AS Quiéry-la-Motte (14)	3–4	Stade Héninois (15)
14.	AS Vendin 2000 (15)	1–5	ES Vendin (12)
15.	US Cheminots Avion (12)	3–3 (3–4 p)	AS Barlin (13)
16.	US Savy-Berlette (14)	0–6	OS Annequin (12)
17.	Entente Verquin-Béthune (15)	0–1	ES Angres (14)
18.	ES Val Sensée (14)	3–3 (7–6 p)	US Feuchy (15)
19.	US Courcelles (14)	4–0	AJ Neuville (15)
20.	JS Achiet-le-Petit (15)	2–4	AS Neuvireuil-Gavrelle (14)
21.	FC Annay (15)	1–7	AAE Dourges (11)
22.	US Ablain (14)	2–9	AS Loison (11)
23.	AJ Artois (12)	4–3	US Arleux-en-Gohelle (13)
24.	AAE Évin-Malmaison (12)	2–3	US Noyelles-sous-Lens (10)
25.	US Beuvry (13)	6–0	Verquigneul FC (14)
26.	US Ham-en-Artois (15)	0–2	US Houdain (12)
27.	AS Noyelles-lés-Vermelles (14)	1–2	AJ Ruitz (15)
28.	Olympique Liévin (12)	4–2	AC Noyelles-Godault (11)
29.	FC Camblain-Châtelain (12)	4–2	FC Hinges (11)
30.	AS Maroeuil (12)	2–1	ES Bois-Bernard-Acheville (13)
31.	JF Mazingarbe (12)	2–0	CS Pogon Auchel (13)
32.	AS Violaines (12)	1–0	FC Montigny-en-Gohelle (11)
33.	US Lapugnoy (13)	4–1	La Couture FC (13)
34.	AO Hermies (12)	0–0 (4–5 p)	ES St Laurent-Blangy (11)
35.	FC Hautes de Lens (12)	0–4	US Grenay (12)
36.	OC Cojeul (13)	0–1 (a.e.t.)	EC Mazingarbe (12)
37.	Olympique Vendin (14)	1–1 (4–5 p)	Thélus FC (15)
38.	AS Robecq (14)	2–1 (a.e.t.)	ES Douvrin (13)
39.	AS Cauchy-à-la-Tour (14)	0–2	US Hesdigneul (13)
40.	Renaissance Estrée-Blanche (15)	0–2	CS Pernes (12)
41.	US Lestrem (12)	4–0	ES Allouagne (13)
42.	US Boubers-Conchy (14)	1–2 (a.e.t.)	AS Roclincourt (15)
43.	US Rivière (16)	3–3 (3–4 p)	ES Buissy-Baralle (15)
44.	FC Estevelles (14)	5–2	CSAL Souchez (13)
45.	FC Beaumount (14)	0–6	SC Artésien (12)
46.	AEP Verdrel (15)	1–1 (2–4 p)	FC Busnes (15)
47.	ES Haillicourt (14)	1–3	Olympique Burbure (12)
48.	ES Anzin-St Aubin (12)	4–0	AS Tincquizel (10)
49.	US Ruch Carvin (12)	1–4	ES Laventie (10)
50.	AS Beaurains (11)	1–3	AFCL Liebaut (11)
51.	CSP St Pierre (13)	1–4	RC Labourse (12)
52.	US Gonnehem-Busnettes (10)	4–1	AS Courrièroise (11)
53.	AS Brebières (13)	2–1 (a.e.t.)	USA Liévin (11)
54.	US Pas-en-Artois (13)	3–2	USO Lens (11)
55.	ES Ste Catherine (11)	2–4 (a.e.t.)	USO Meurchin (10)
56.	JF Guarbecque (11)	1–1 (1–3 p)	AS Sailly-Labourse (12)
57.	CS Diana Liévin (11)	6–2	US Croisilles (10)
58.	UAS Harnes (12)	4–1	Tilloy FC (10)
59.	AAE Aix-Noulette (12)	1–0	FC Dainvillois (13)
60.	SC Fouquières (13)	5–1	AOSC Sallaumines (10)
61.	Valhuon FC (15)	1–3	AS Auchy-les-Mines (13)
62.	RC Sains (12)	3–5	ASPTT Arras (12)
63.	CS Habarcq (13)	2–0	AS Pont-á-Vendin (13)
64.	UC Divion (13)	2–2 (3–2 p)	CS Marles-Lozingheim (10)
65.	FC La Roupie-Isbergues (13)	1–3	US Annezin (11)
66.	Diables Rouges Lambres-lez-Aire (12)	3–2	AS Lensoies (10)
67.	AEP St Inglevert (15)	1–4	US Hardinghen (14)
68.	US Bomy (15)	3–4 (a.e.t.)	AS Esquerdes (13)
69.	ES Helfaut (13)	1–1 (2–4 p)	ES Roquetoire (12)
70.	ESL Boulogne-sur-Mer (12)	2–4 (a.e.t.)	JS Desvroise (10)
71.	US Créquy-Planquette (11)	2–1	AS Auchy-lès-Hesdin (12)
72.	Le Portel GPF (15)	2–1	FC La Capelle (13)
73.	FC Campagne-lès-Guines (11)	5–0	US Marquise (10)
74.	RC Ardésien (12)	0–2	US Nielles-lès-Bléquin (10)
75.	RC Lottinghen (15)	4–3 (a.e.t.)	US Rety (15)
76.	JS Condette (11)	0–1	US Dannes (12)
77.	US Thérouanne (13)	5–1	FC Wardrecques (11)
78.	US Alquines (13)	1–3 (a.e.t.)	AS Wierre-Effroy (11)
79.	US Hesdin-l'Abbé (12)	4–2	US Frencq (13)
80.	US Bonningues-lès-Calais (13)	0–4	ES Licques (11)
81.	US Coulomby (15)	2–3	US Vaudringhem (13)
82.	ES Mametz (12)	2–1	AS Hallines (11)
83.	FC Nordausques (12)	0–1	Recques FC (11)
84.	CO Wimille (10)	1–5	USO Rinxent (11)
85.	AS Surques-Escœuilles (12)	1–2	US Ambleteuse (12)
86.	JS Bonningues-lès-Ardres (12)	0–2	CS Watten (11)
87.	SLE Groffliers (16)	1–5	AC Tubersent (14)
88.	US Dohem-Avroult-Cléty (12)	4–3	US Blaringhem (10)
89.	Gouy-St André RC (15)	4–4 (3–4 p)	JS Créquoise Loison (13)
90.	RC Offekerque (14)	3–0	SL Nieurlet (16)
91.	Amicale Balzac (12)	4–3 (a.e.t.)	AS St Tricat/Nielles (13)
92.	ES Beaurainville (11)	5–0	AS Rang-du-Fliers (12)
93.	FC Conti (10)	4–1	US Porteloise (11)
94.	US Quiestède (11)	0–1	FCP Blendecques (12)
95.	ES Oye-Plage (10)	0–2	CA Éperlecques (10)
96.	FC Isques (14)	10–0	US Outreau (13)
97.	US Élinghen-Ferques (15)	0–4	SL Alincthun (14)
98.	FC Sangatte (11)	3–1	US Landrethun-le-Nord (10)
99.	ES Herbelles-Pihem-Inghem (13)	3–5 (a.e.t.)	Longuenesse Malafoot (11)
100.	FC Ecques-Heuringhem (13)	1–3	JS Renescuroise (11)
101.	AS Campagne-lès-Hesdin (12)	1–2	Olympique Hesdin-Marconne (10)
102.	Calais Beau-Marais (10)	5–0	US Attaquoise (11)
103.	FC Landrethun-lès-Ardres (15)	1–6	CA Vieille-Église (14)
104.	RC Bréquerecque Ostrohove (12)	3–1	AS Crémarest (13)
105.	US Équihen-Plage (10)	0–3 (Note: US Équihen-Plage penalised for fielding a suspended player. RC Samer progress to the second round. Original scoreline 3–2.)	RC Samer (11)
106.	FC Wizernes (15)	void (Note: The match was abandoned in the 80th minute (with the scoreline 3–0), after an altercation involving players from both teams and spectators. Both sides were subsequently penalised and removed from the competition.)	US St Quentin-Bléssy (12)
107.	AS Nortkerque 95 (10)	7–1	US Polincove (12)
108.	AS Maresquel (14)	4–3 (a.e.t.)	AS Fillièvres (12)
109.	Amicale Pont-de-Briques (13)	3–2	ASL Vieil-Moutier La Calique (11)
110.	AS Calais (16)	1–3	FC Fréthun (15)
111.	US Verchocq-Ergny-Herly (13)	2–3	FC Wavrans-sur-l'Aa (11)
112.	Union St Loupoise (14)	0–4	AS Fruges (13)
113.	FC Wissant (14)	0–3	US Marais de Gûines (11)
114.	US Brimeux (11)	1–2	AS Cucq (10)
115.	FC Merlimont (13)	1–4	AL Camiers (11)
116.	JS Racquinghem (13)	3–3 (4–5 p)	ES St Omer Rural (11)
117.	FC Calais Catena (12)	0–4	ASC Arc International (12)
118.	Olympique Menneville (14)	0–7	ES St Léonard (11)
119.	JS Blangy-sur-Ternoise (14)	2–1	JS Le Parcq (15)
120.	US Colembert (13)	1–5	CAP Le Portel (11)
121.	Verton FC (12)	8–2	AS Boisjean (13)
122.	AS Tournehem (11)	6–0	FC Setques (14)
123.	SO Calais (13)	1–2	FJEP Fort Vert (12)
124.	AS St Martin-au-Laërt (12)	9–0	FC Thiembronne (13)
125.	AS Conchil-le-Temple (13)	4–0	US Vieil-Hesdin (12)
126.	FLC Longfossé (11)	1–6	US Attin (10)
127.	AS Wimereux (11)	2–4 (a.e.t.)	US Bourthes (10)
128.	FC Avesnes-sur-Helpe (9)	2–1	US Fourmies (10)
129.	JS Avesnelloise (17)	5–3	CA Sainsois (15)
130.	Wignehies Olympique (15)	5–1	AS Étrœungt (14)
131.	US Glageon (14)	1–0	AS Dompierre (13)
132.	FC St Hilaire-sur-Helpe (14)	1–0	AS Trélon (12)
133.	Olympique Maroilles (12)	0–1	Sports Podéens Réunis (11)
134.	US Ors (15)	1–3	US Prisches (14)
135.	US Englefontaine (17)	2–0	US Landrecies (15)
136.	FC Fontaine-au-Bois (15)	0–3	AS Neuvilly (14)
137.	US St Souplet (14)	2–2 (2–0 p)	SC Le Cateau (13)
138.	AS Montay (16)	4–0	FC Pommereuil (15)
139.	AG Solrézienne (13)	0–4	US Cousolre (12)
140.	US Beaufort/Limont-Fontaine (14)	2–4	IC Ferrière-la-Grande (12)
141.	AFC Ferrière-la-Petite (14)	0–1	SC St Remy-du-Nord (13)
142.	US Rousies (14)	3–0 (Note: ES Boussois penalised for fielding a suspended player. US Rousies progress to the second round. Original scoreline 0–3.)	ES Boussois (13)
143.	US Villersoise (14)	3–0 (Note: AS Recquignies penalised after the game was abandoned after 43 minutes. US Villersoise progress to the second round.)	AS Recquignies (13)
144.	FC Epinette-Maubeuge (12)	1–2 (a.e.t.)	FC Marpent (11)
145.	Red Star Jeumont (16)	3–0	Maubeuge Olympique (16)
146.	RC Maubeuge (15)	0–3	Maubeuge FCCA (14)
147.	AS La Longueville (12)	0–4	AS Douzies (10)
148.	OSC Assevent (12)	1–0	US Bavay (10)
149.	AS Obies (16)	0–1	SCEPS Pont-sur-Sambre (15)
150.	AS Bellignies (12)	0–1	SC Bachant (13)
151.	US Gommegnies-Carnoy (10)	1–0	US Jeumont (11)
152.	Olympique Mareschois (15)	0–9	SA Le Quesnoy (13)
153.	US Bousies (13)	1–1 (6–5 p)	FC Solesmes (12)
154.	US Élincourt (12)	5–0	US Quiévy (11)
155.	FC Maretz (16)	0–2 (a.e.t.)	US Bertry-Clary (15)
156.	US Les Rues-des-Vignes (15)	2–5	Entente Ligny/Olympique Caullery (15)
157.	AS Masnières (11)	0–1	US Fontaine-Notre-Dame (12)
158.	US Rumilly (14)	1–5	SC Fontaine-au-Pire (15)
159.	US Beauvois Fontaine (14)	3–2	US Walincourt-Selvigny (13)
160.	FC Provillois (12)	0–3 (Note: FC Provillois penalised for fielding a suspended player. SS Marcoing progress to the second round. Original scoreline was 1–1 (4–3 p).)	SS Marcoing (13)
161.	AS Bourlon (13)	2–2 (2–4 p)	FC Cambrai-St Roch (15)
162.	ES Haynecourt-Épinoy (14)	1–5	OM Cambrai Amérique (12)
163.	ES Paillencourt-Estrun (12)	2–1	FC Neuville-St Rémy (11)
164.	US Aubigny-au-Bac (17)	1–5	Olympique St Ollois (15)
165.	FC Villers-en-Cauchies (15)	2–3	FC Iwuy (14)
166.	US Briastre (16)	0–1	OC Avesnois (14)
167.	US St Aubert (11)	5–0	US Aulnoy (11)
168.	Haspres FC (15)	0–3	US Haussy (13)
169.	US Verchain-Maugré (15)	0–12	FC Saulzoir (13)
170.	US Lieu-St Amand (15)	0–3	Douchy FC (12)
171.	ES Noyelloise (14)	1–2 (a.e.t.)	EA Prouvy (13)
172.	FC Fressain (16)	0–3	RC Lécluse (14)
173.	FC Estrées (14)	0–0 (3–4 p)	ESM Hamel (14)
174.	USCL Lewarde (15)	3–0	FC Cantin (15)
175.	FC Monchecourt (16)	0–4	Olympique Marquette (14)
176.	ES Bouchain (13)	4–1	Neuville OSC (13)
177.	US Denaisienne (13)	1–2	SC Lourches (13)
178.	US Corbehem (15)	2–3 (a.e.t.)	FC Férin (12)
179.	AS Courchelettes (11)	1–4	SC Aniche (10)
180.	US Erre-Hornaing (11)	4–2 (a.e.t.)	USAC Somain (10)
181.	AS Douai-Lambres Cheminots (13)	0–7	FC Masny (11)
182.	FC Pecquencourt (14)	0–2	Les Épis Foot (13)
183.	Dechy Sports (13)	2–3	US Pecquencourt (14)
184.	US Frais Marais (14)	1–4	US Loffre-Erchin (13)
185.	FC Roost-Warendin (13)	2–1	AS Cuincy (11)
186.	US Pont Flers (13)	4–0	US Raimbeaucourt (11)
187.	AS Douai Sit Nord (16)	4–11	DC Lallaing (14)
188.	US Montigny-en-Ostrevent (13)	3–4	Olympic Marchiennois (15)
189.	ES Bouvignies (15)	0–3	UF Anhiers (12)
190.	AJ Alcyaquoise (14)	1–2	FC Nomain (16)
191.	Olympique Flinois (13)	2–0	AS Coutiches (12)
192.	AF Rieulay (16)	3–0 (Note: AS Denain Nouveau Monde penalised for fielding a suspended player. AF Rieulay progress to the second round. Original scoreline was 3–0.)	AS Denain Nouveau Monde (14)
193.	AS Château-l'Abbaye (13)	1–0	Olympique Landasien (12)
194.	US Hergnies (14)	0–3	FC Lecelles-Rosult (12)
195.	Vieux Condé (11)	6–2 (a.e.t.)	Stade Fresnois (10)
196.	Bayonne Sport Hergnies (16)	1–0	AFC Escautpont (14)
197.	RC Rœulx (17)	1–8	JS Abscon (13)
198.	ES Mastaing FC (17)	5–4	JS Haveluy (14)
199.	AS Artres (15)	2–1	US Villers-Pol (15)
200.	Maing FC (11)	2–0	CO Trith-St Léger (11)
201.	FC Jenlain (16)	3–0	FCPJ Sebourg
202.	AS Curgies (14)	2–0	AS Estreux (13)
203.	FC Saultain (12)	0–3 (Note: FC Saultain penalised for fielding a suspended player. US Briquette progress to the second round. Original scoreline was 3–2.)	US Briquette (11)
204.	Anzin FARC (11)	3–2	USM Marly (10)
205.	FC Famars (13)	2–0	AS Summer Club Valenciennes (12)
206.	St Saulve Foot (14)	5–1	St Waast CFC (13)
207.	ES Crespin (12)	6–0	Olympique Onnaingeois (10)
208.	USM Beuvrages (12)	0–1	Bruay Sports (10)
209.	AS Petite-Forêt (15)	0–3	JO Wallers-Arenberg (12)
210.	US Auberchicourt (14)	3–2	AS Wavrechain-sous-Denain (13)
211.	US Viesly (12)	0–3	US Berlaimont (11)
212.	SC Vicq (16)	1–0	Inter Condé (16)
213.	FC Annœullin (10)	3–7	Mons AC (8)
214.	EC Anstaing-Chéreng-Tressin-Gruson (10)	2–3 (a.e.t.)	ES Mouvalloise (8)
215.	AS Bersée (11)	0–2	AS Hellemmes (9)
216.	CS Bousbecque (11)	0–10	FC Bondues (9)
217.	ES Cappelle-Pont-à-Marcq (11)	2–2 (4–2 p)	Union Halluinoise (9)
218.	CS Erquinghem-Lys (11)	2–0	SC Bailleulois (9)
219.	US Estaires (11)	0–0 (3–4 p)	ESC Illies-Aubers-Lorgies (9)
220.	Flers OS (11)	1–9	Leers OF (9)
221.	FC Madeleinois (11)	0–1	IC Lambersart (9)
222.	FC Le Doulieu (11)	0–4	CS La Gorgue (9)
223.	Stade Lezennois (11)	0–5	JS Lille Wazemmes (9)
224.	RC Bois-Blancs Lille (11)	1–0 (a.e.t.)	US Pérenchies (9)
225.	Lille Faubourg de Béthune (11)	0–4 (Note: Lille Faubourg de Béthune penalised for fielding a suspended player. ES Roncq progress to the second round.)	ES Roncq (9)
226.	ES Lille Louvière Pellevoisin (11)	0–6	SCO Roubaix (9)
227.	OSM Lomme (11)	0–4	AO Sainghinoise (9)
228.	FC Wambrechies (11)	1–1 (3–2 p)	AS Templeuve-en-Pévèle (9)
229.	AS Bourgogne Tourcoing (12)	1–2	Olympique Hémois (10)
230.	EAC Cysoing-Wannehain-Bourghelles (12)	1–0	AS Baisieux Patro (10)
231.	FC Deûlémont (12)	2–1	ES Ennequin-Loos (10)
232.	Faches-Thumesnil FC (12)	4–1	ES Genech (10)
233.	AS Radinghem (12)	0–3	CG Haubourdin (10)
234.	FC Emmerin (12)	0–5	ES Weppes (10)
235.	FC Lambersart (10)	3–2	ES Frelinghein (12)
236.	US Fretin (12)	1–5	US St André (10)
237.	CS Gondecourt (12)	3–2	FC Linselles (10)
238.	EC Houplines (12)	0–1	ACS Comines (10)
239.	FC La Chapelle-d'Armentières (12)	2–2 (3–4 p)	OSM Sequedin (10)
240.	AS Vieux-Lille (12)	0–3	US Wattrelos (10)
241.	SR Lomme Délivrance (12)	1–2	Stella Lys (10)
242.	FC Nieppois (12)	0–9	FC Santes (10)
243.	JS Steenwerck (11)	1–1 (3–1 p)	Bac-Sailly Sports (13)
244.	EC Camphin-en-Pévèle (13)	3–0 (Note: OC Roubaisien penalised for fielding a suspended player. EC Camphin-en-Pévèle progress to the second round. Original scoreline was 3–4.)	OC Roubaisien (11)
245.	AS Barbe D'Or Roubaix (11)	0–2	FC Forestois (13)
246.	US Houplin-Ancoisne (13)	1–5	Verlinghem Foot (11)
247.	Olympique Mérignies (13)	2–0	US Ronchin (11)
248.	Prémesques FC (13)	1–2	FC Wattignies (11)
249.	Football St Michel Quesnoy (13)	3–2	Wattrelos FC (11)
250.	Colisée Vimaranense Roubaix (13)	1–4	JS Wavrin-Don (11)
251.	FC Sainginhois (13)	1–4	US Phalempin (12)
252.	US Provin (12)	6–0 (Note: AG Thumeries penalised for fielding a suspended player. US Provin progress to the second round. Original scoreline was 6–1)	AG Thumeries (13)
253.	UJS Cheminots Tourcoing (12)	5–2	Toufflers AF (13)
254.	CS EIC Tourcoing (13)	2–3	FC Sailly-lez-Lannoy (12)
255.	US Wervicquoise (13)	1–3 (a.e.t.)	FA Blanc Seau (12)
256.	ESF Avelin-Ennevelin (14)	0–3	FC Templemars-Vendeville (12)
257.	US Fleurbaisienne (12)	1–5	US Antillais Lille Métropole (12)
258.	AS St Jean-Baptiste Roubaix (14)	2–1	AS Marcq
259.	ES Wormhout (10)	5–0 (Note: Fort-Mardyck OC penalised for fielding a suspended player. ES Wormhout progress to the second round.)	Fort-Mardyck OC (11)
260.	AS Albeck Grand-Synthe (10)	1–2 (a.e.t.)	AS Dunkerque Sud (9)
261.	FC Bierne (10)	4–1	US Cappelle-la-Grand (11)
262.	FC Rosendaël (11)	1–4	SC Grand-Fort-Philippe (9)
263.	US Leffrinckoucke (11)	0–2	SC Bourbourg (10)
264.	ES Bambecquoise (14)	2–3	US Wallon-Cappel (13)
265.	US Mardyck (13)	3–0	ASF Coudekerque (14)
266.	US Téteghem (10)	2–1	USF Armbouts-Cappel (11)
267.	CO Quaëdypre (11)	0–2	JS Ghyveldoise (10)
268.	USF Coudekerquois (11)	1–5	US Yser (10)
269.	FC Steene (11)	5–0	ES Boeschepe (12)
270.	AS Steenvorde (10)	17–0	AS Usines Dunkerque (11)
271.	US Bray-Dunes (12)	4–1	FC Méteren (13)
272.	US Hondschoote (12)	0–3	AS Dockers Dunkerque (11)
273.	AS Nordpeene-Zuytpeene (11)	0–1	RC Bergues (10)
274.	US Bavinchove-Cassel (11)	5–1	AJL Caëstre (12)
275.	AAJ Uxem (11)	0–2	ASC Hazebrouck (10)
276.	FC Craywick (13)	0–2	ACS Hoymille (12)
277.	FC St Folquin (13)	1–3	SM Petite-Synthe (13)
278.	US Warhem (11)	5–0	USCC St Pol-sur-Mer (10)

=== Rhône-Alpes ===
These matches were played on 27 and 28 August 2016.

First round results: Rhône-Alpes

Tie no	Home team (tier)	Score	Away team (tier)
1.	ASF Perrelatte (9)	0–5	Olympique de Valence (8)
2.	ES St Alban-Grospierre (13)	2–3	Indépendante Blachèroise (12)
3.	AG Bons-en-Chablais (11)	5–0	ES Valleiry (11)
4.	ASC Sallanches (11)	0–3	ES Amancy (8)
5.	CS Belley (10)	3–3 (5–4 p)	ES Bourget-du-Lac (11)
6.	US Bussières (11)	1–4	AL Fleurie/Villié-Morgon (10)
7.	ASM St Pierre-la-Palud (12)	6–2	US Beaujolaise (11)
8.	AS Cours (12)	1–4	ES Sorbiers (10)
9.	US Briennon (11)	2–2 (3–4 p)	Sud Azergues Foot (9)
10.	AF81 St Just-la-Pendue (12)	1–2	CS Cremeaux (11)
11.	Rhins Trambouze Foot (10)	0–4	ES Lamurien (8)
12.	ES Montrondaise (11)	2–0	Stade Amplepuisien (10)
13.	AS Boën-Trelins (12)	1–4	Olympique Le Coteau (11)
14.	AS St Laurent-la-Conche (12)	2–3	US Chambost Lestra (11)
15.	FC St Cyr-de-Favières	3–0	Roanne AS Parc du Sport (11)
16.	FC Loire Sornin (11)	0–1	FC Roanne Clermont (9)
17.	AS Finerbal (11)	2–5	AS Chambéon-Magneux (9)
18.	FC Perreux (12)	0–1	Roanne Matel SFC (11)
19.	US Filerin (11)	1–1 (5–4 p)	ES Champdieu-Marcilly (9)
20.	AS Chausseterre-Les Salles (11)	0–3	US Renaisonnaise Apchonnaise (11)
21.	ES Gleizé (11)	2–2 (7–8 p)	FC Commelle-Vernay (9)
22.	AS Couzan (12)	0–1	US Sud Forézienne (10)
23.	US Ecotay-Moingt (12)	2–2 (3–2 p)	AS St Forgeux (10)
24.	AS St Cyr-les-Vignes (11)	3–1	AS St Martinoise (10)
25.	FC Lézigneux (12)	2–5	Riorges FC (10)
26.	FC St Romain-de-Popey (10)	0–3	Forez Donzy FC (10)
27.	ACL Mably (10)	1–4	US Villerest (9)
28.	AS Ouest Roannais (11)	1–2	FC Tarare (11)
29.	Cœur de Savoie (9)	0–5	Olympique Albertville FC (9)
30.	FC St Martin d'Uriage (12)	1–5	FC Allobroges Asafia (9)
31.	FC Bauges (13)	2–2 (2–4 p)	AS Bozel Mont Jovet (11)
32.	Cognin Sports (9)	12–0	Entente Sonnaz-Viviers-Voglans (11)
33.	ES Lanfonnet (12)	1–2	Chambéry Sport 73 (9)
34.	FC Villargondran (11)	0–4	CA Maurienne (10)
35.	Marthod Sport (11)	1–3	FC St Baldoph (9)
36.	FC Belle Étoile Mercury (10)	6–1	Challes SF (13)
37.	AS Grésivaudan (12)	3–4 (a.e.t.)	Entente Val d'Hyères (9)
38.	US La Ravoire (10)	0–2	FC Chambotte (9)
39.	FC St Michel-de-Maurienne (11)	2–0	Montmélian AF (9)
40.	AS Barby-Leysse OC (12)	1–2 (a.e.t.)	US Modane (11)
41.	AS Ascropol (10)	3–0	AJA Villeneuve (9)
42.	Ste Hélène FC (11)	0–1	FC Haute Tarentaise (9)
43.	FOC Froges (14)	0–1	FC Versoud (12)
44.	FC Sud Isère (11)	2–3	AS Martinerois (9)
45.	US Grignon (10)	1–6	ES Manival (8)
46.	FC Veurey (10)	2–0	US Motteraine (8)
47.	USC Aiguebelle (12)	0–4	JS Chambéry (8)
48.	US Argonay (10)	0–3	US Annecy-le-Vieux (8)
49.	ASL St Cassien (10)	3–3 (4–2 p)	US Sassenage (8)
50.	Le Grand-Lemps/Colombe/Apprieu Foot 38 (11)	1–0	US Jarrie-Champ (9)
51.	AS Dolon (11)	2–0	Vallis Auréa Foot (10)
52.	FC St Quentin (11)	1–4	ASJF Domène (10)
53.	JS St Georgeoise (11)	1–2	FC Seyssins (10)
54.	FC Sauzet (11)	0–1 (a.e.t.)	Entente Crest-Aouste (9)
55.	Noyarey FC (12)	0–5	OC Eybens (9)
56.	Vourey SF (12)	0–3	FC Crolles-Bernin (10)
57.	US Ro-Claix (11)	1–3	US Mours (9)
58.	FC Goubetois (11)	0–1	CO Châteauneuvois (10)
59.	JS St Paul-lès-Romans (11)	1–3	JS Montilienne (10)
60.	AS Tullins Fures (11)	1–3	FC des Collines (11)
61.	FC St Laurent-en Royans (13)	3–4	FC Larnage-Serves (11)
62.	US 2 Vallons (13)	0–5	RC Mauves (10)
63.	FC Hermitage (11)	1–3	SC Romans (10)
64.	FC Liers (13)	0–5	Claix Football (10)
65.	FC Quatre Montagnes (12)	0–5	Deux Rochers FC (10)
66.	AS Rivieroise (12)	2–4	AS Ver Sau (9)
67.	FC Bren (12)	2–4	US Vallée du Jabron (10)
68.	CS Miribel (12)	3–1	CS Voreppe (10)
69.	Diois FC (13)	2–4	EA Montvendre (12)
70.	CS Guinéens de l'Isère (13)	2–0	FC Pont de Claix (11)
71.	FC Chirens (13)	3–4	US St Paul-de-Varces (11)
72.	ES St Laris-Montchenu (13)	2–2 (1–3 p)	Olympique Montéléger (11)
73.	AS Vercors (14)	2–11	ASL Génissieux (12)
74.	AC Poisat (12)	2–3 (a.e.t.)	AS Vertrieu (11)
75.	AS Cheyssieu (12)	3–2	FC Colombier-St Barthélemy (11)
76.	CS Lapeyrousien (13)	1–2	FC Clérieux-St Bardoux-Granges-les-Beaumont (13)
77.	FC Montmiral-Parnans (12)	3–1	US Croix du Fraysse (11)
78.	AS La Bastide Puylaurent (13)	0–5	Olympique Ruomsois (8)
79.	ES Izeaux (11)	1–0	US Corbelin (11)
80.	US Vals-les-Bains (12)	3–0	US Rochemaure (11)
81.	Olympique Centre Ardèche (10)	0–4	Valence FC (8)
82.	AS St Marcelloise (10)	0–4	FC Péageois (8)
83.	US St Just-St Marcel (11)	1–4	AS Véore Montoison (8)
84.	US Montélier (12)	2–2 (6–7 p)	Rhône Crussol Foot 07 (9)
85.	FC Rochetoirin (12)	2–0	FC Comoriens Lyon (12)
86.	AS St Genis-Ferney-Crozet (9)	3–5 (3–5 p)	US Divonne (8)
87.	AS Lac Bleu (9)	0–3	ES Tarentaise (8)
88.	US Pringy (10)	2–1 (Note: US Pringy penalised for fielding a suspended player. AS Montréal-la-Cluse qualify for the second round.)	AS Montréal-la-Cluse (8)
89.	FC Foron (9)	0–1	FC Chéran (8)
90.	FRS Champanges (12)	1–3	US Challex (11)
91.	AS Cornier (12)	4–2	FC Haut-Rhône (13)
92.	ES Viry (13)	1–2	AS Paremlan Villaz (12)
93.	AS Évires (13)	2–4	FC Thônes (10)
94.	US Marnaz (12)	2–3	FC Les Houches-Servoz (13)
95.	Football St Jeoirien (13)	0–5	Haut Giffre FC (11)
96.	AS Orcier (13)	3–8	FC Cessy-Gex (11)
97.	FC Beaufortain Queige (12)	1–3	St Pierre SF (11)
98.	FC Chainaz-les-Frasses (12)	0–2	US Le Châble-Beaumont (11)
99.	Arthaz Sports (13)	0–2	CSA Poisy (10)
100.	CS La Balme-de-Sillingy (11)	7–1	FC Arenthon-Scientrier (11)
101.	Bonne AC (12)	2–3 (a.e.t.)	FC La Filière (12)
102.	FC Aravis (13)	3–3 (5–4 p)	SC Morzine Vallée d'Aulps (11)
103.	Association Portugais Oyonnax (13)	5–1	Valserine FC (11)
104.	FC Frangy (11)	4–1	AS Travailleurs Turcs Oyonnax (10)
105.	FC Anthy Sport (12)	0–3	ES Seynod (9)
106.	FC Cranves-Sales (11)	0–1	ES Cernex (10)
107.	FC Ambilly (10)	3–4	Ville-la-Grand FC (10)
108.	US Izernore (12)	3–4 (a.e.t.)	US Veyziat (11)
109.	CS Veigy-Foncenex (13)	1–3 (a.e.t.)	Échenevex-Ségny-Chevry Olympique (10)
110.	CSL Perrignier (12)	3–1	Football Sud Gessien (10)
111.	US Pers-Jussy (13)	2–1 (a.e.t.)	FC Gavot (11)
112.	AS Épagny-Metz-Tessy (12)	1–3	AS Sillingy (10)
113.	AS Le Lyaud-Armoy (11)	1–2 (a.e.t.)	ES Meythet (10)
114.	CO Chavanod (11)	0–1	SS Allinges (10)
115.	US St Julien-en-Genevois (10)	4–2	FC Cluses (8)
116.	ES St Jeoire-La Tour (10)	1–3	ES Thyez (8)
117.	US Margencel (10)	1–2	FC Semine (11)
118.	AJ Ville-la-Grand (11)	0–1	ES Fillinges (10)
119.	FC Ballaison (9)	9–0	AS Viuz-en-Sallaz (13)
120.	US Collonges-sous-Salève (12)	1–6	JS Reignier (9)
121.	AS Ferney-Voltaire (12)	2–5	ES Chilly (9)
122.	ES Douvaine-Loisin (12)	0–3	US Annemasse (9)
123.	CS Chamonix (11)	0–4	US Mont Blanc (9)
124.	CS Megève (12)	1–4	AS Ugine (9)
125.	CS St Pierre (12)	1–4	Marignier Sports (9)
126.	FC Léman Presqu'île (12)	1–6	Annemasse Sud FC (9)
127.	AS Portugais Annecy (12)	0–3	Olympique Cran (9)
128.	Entente Plaine Montagne (12)	0–1	Haute Brévenne Foot (9)
129.	Rhône Sud FC (11)	1–6	SEL St Priest-en-Jarez (9)
130.	AS Vallée du Doux (11)	0–1	ES La Talaudière (9)
131.	FC Châtelet (10)	6–4	SC St Paul-Amions-Dancé (9)
132.	JS Irigny (11)	2–3	FC Bonson-St Cyprien (10)
133.	Lyon Croix Rousse Football (11)	0–1	Football Mont-Pilat (9)
134.	ES St Christo-Marcenod (11)	0–2	CO La Rivière (10)
135.	AS Cancoise Villevocance (12)	0–2	FCI St Romain-le-Puy (10)
136.	CO Précieux (11)	0–4	AS Jonzieux (10)
137.	FC Luriecq (11)	0–4	FC St Paul-en-Jarez (10)
138.	FC Planfoy (12)	2–4 (a.e.t.)	FC Bourguisan (11)
139.	AS St Ferréol-Gampille-Firminy (12)	2–0	AS St Just-St Rambert (11)
140.	AS Cuzieu (12)	1–5	ES St Jean-Bonnefonds (11)
141.	Sury SC (12)	0–3	JS Cellieu (11)
142.	FC Lerptien (12)	1–2	FC Périgneux (11)
143.	JS St Victor-sur-Loire (12)	2–3 (a.e.t.)	Bellegarde Sports (11)
144.	ES Doizieux-La Terrasse-sur-Dorlay (12)	2–3	FC St Charles Vigilante (11)
145.	FC Marcellinois (12)	3–6	Olympique du Montcel (11)
146.	St Romain-les-Atheux Sports (12)	0–3	FC Bords de Loire (11)
147.	US L'Horme (13)	1–2	AJ Chapellois (11)
148.	SC St Sixte (12)	1–0	Haut Pilat Interfoot (11)
149.	FC Plaine Poncins (12)	0–6	ES Haut Forez (11)
150.	CS St Anthème (12)	2–1 (a.e.t.)	ABH FC (11)
151.	AS Aveizieux (12)	1–0	AS Roiffieux (11)
152.	SS Ussonnaise (12)	3–3 (3–4 p)	US Davézieux-Vidalon (11)
153.	FCO Firminy-Insersport (9)	0–1	Feyzin Club Belle Étoile (8)
154.	US Val d'Ay (9)	2–2 (1–3 p)	SC Grand-Croix/Lorette (8)
155.	JSO Givors (10)	1–2	AS Savigneux-Montbrison (8)
156.	FC Grigny (9)	0–1	L'Étrat-La Tour Sportif (8)
157.	ES Boulieu (10)	1–4	US St Galmier-Chambœuf (8)
158.	US Loire-sur-Rhône (9)	1–3	US Metare St Étienne Sud-Est (8)
159.	FC Serrières-Sablons (10)	2–1	AS Algérienne Chambon-Feugerolles (8)
160.	GS Chasse-sur-Rhône (9)	0–2	US Villars (8)
161.	USG La Fouillouse (9)	3–3 (7–6 p)	FC Annonay (8)
162.	Entente Sarras Sports St Vallier (10)	5–3 (a.e.t.)	AS Châteauneuf (8)
163.	CA Panissierèes (12)	0–2	AS Grézieu-le-Marché (10)
164.	FC Antillais Villeurbanne (13)	2–2 (5–6 p)	FC Gerland (10)
165.	Lou Football (12)	3–1	FC Croix Roussien (11)
166.	JS Bresse Dombes (12)	1–2 (a.e.t.)	SC Mille Etangs (12)
167.	Latino AFC Lyon (12)	1–2	AS Rhodanienne (10)
168.	FC St Étienne (11)	2–1	FC Chazelles (10)
169.	AS Dardilly (11)	1–0	US Montanay (10)
170.	ES Charly Foot (11)	1–2	FC Ste Foy-lès-Lyon (10)
171.	ASC Gle Routière Maïa Sonnier (12)	0–2 (a.e.t.)	FC Deux Fontaines (11)
172.	GOS Couzon (12)	0–5	FO Bourg (10)
173.	US Cheminots Lyon Vaise (11)	0–1	AS Craponne (9)
174.	AS Grézieu-la-Varenne (11)	1–6	CAS Cheminots Oullins Lyon (10)
175.	FC Sud Ouest 69 (10)	1–2 (a.e.t.)	UO Tassin-la-Demi-Lune (10)
176.	FC Franchevilloise (11)	0–1	AS Denicé (11)
177.	AS Larajasse (11)	3–5	Ménival FC (10)
178.	AC Rive-de-Gier (9)	1–1 (1–3 p)	Lyon Ouest SC (8)
179.	Feu Vert St Chamond (10)	1–3	FC Val Lyonnais (8)
180.	CO Rochetaillée (12)	1–12	Sud Lyonnais Foot (8)
181.	St Étienne UC Terrenoire (11)	1–2	AF Pays de Coise (10)
182.	Eveil Lyon (12)	1–1 (3–4 p)	CS Ozon (10)
183.	Olympique Les Avenières (13)	2–1 (a.e.t.)	FC de la Plaine de l'Ain (12)
184.	Olympique Villefontaine (13)	11–1	AS Sérézin-de-la-Tour (12)
185.	Moirans FC (14)	0–3	US Beauvoir-Royas (12)
186.	Amicale Tunisienne St Martin-d'Hères (12)	3–2	AS Crossey (11)
187.	AS St Lattier (12)	1–0	FC Tignieu-Jameyzieu (11)
188.	Côtière Meximieux-Villeu (11)	2–5	US Meyzieu (9)
189.	AS Genay (10)	4–2 (a.e.t.)	US Berges du Rhône (10)
190.	FC Anthon (13)	1–2	ACS Mayotte du Rhône (11)
191.	FC Reussite de Décines (13)	0–6	AS Portugaise Vaulx-en-Velin (11)
192.	CS Faramans (14)	4–3 (a.e.t.)	Olympique Buyatin (12)
193.	Muroise Foot (11)	6–5 (a.e.t.)	US Vaulx-en-Velin (10)
194.	Rives SF (11)	0–2	AS Villefontaine (11)
195.	ES Revermontoise (11)	1–5	Concordia FC Bellegarde (10)
196.	FC Bilieu (12)	0–7	Isle d'Abeau FC (10)
197.	AS Villeurbanne Éveil Lyonnais (10)	3–5 (a.e.t.)	AS Domarin (10)
198.	Union Nord Iséroise (11)	3–0	AS Vézeronce-Huert (10)
199.	AS Portugaise Bourgoin-Jallieu (11)	4–2	UO Portugal St Martin-d'Hères (11)
200.	Olympic Sathonay (10)	1–2	AS Algerienne Villeurbanne (10)
201.	FC Balmes Nord-Isère (10)	5–3 (a.e.t.)	AS Buers Villeurbanne (10)
202.	US Dolomoise (11)	3–1	AL Mions (9)
203.	FC Franc Lyonnais (11)	3–0	SC Maccabi Lyon (11)
204.	AS Confluence (11)	3–3 (9–10 p)	Chazay FC (9)
205.	FC Sourcieux-les-Mines (12)	2–3	FC Rive Droite (10)
206.	FC Rontalon (13)	2–3	USF Tarare (11)
207.	CS Anatolia (12)	0–3	AL St Maurice-l'Exil (9)
208.	SC Piraillon (13)	0–3	FC Montrambert Ricamar (12)
209.	AS Brignais (12)	1–0	FC St Joseph (12)
210.	FC Colombier-Satolas (11)	3–5	ES St Priest (9)
211.	ES Genas Azieu (10)	2–1	AS Manissieux (10)
212.	ASC Portugais St Fons (10)	5–0	Olympique Rillieux (10)
213.	USM Pierre-Bénite (12)	2–3	AS Bellecour-Perrache (9)
214.	ES Trinité Lyon (10)	1–3	Olympique Vaulx-en-Velin (9)
215.	CVL 38 FC (11)	0–4	CO St Fons (9)
216.	US Ruy-Montceau (12)	1–2	US Venissieux (9)
217.	US Reventin (11)	2–1	FC Varèze (9)
218.	FC Pays Viennois (9)	1–4	AS Montchat Lyon (8)
219.	FC Côtière-Luenaz (9)	0–1	SC Portes de l'Ain (8)
220.	Olympiqe St Quentinois (10)	1–1 (4–5 p)	Football Côte St André (8)
221.	US Est Lyonnais (9)	2–7	CS Lagnieu (8)
222.	CF Estrablin (10)	0–7	FC Chaponnay-Marennes (8)
223.	FC Chabeuil (9)	3–2 (a.e.t.)	AS Donatienne (8)
224.	FC Chanas (10)	0–3	Olympique Nord Dauphiné (8)
225.	US La Murette (11)	2–4	Olympique Rhodia (8)
226.	Mouloudia Club Le Pouzin (10)	0–2	AS Sud Ardèche (8)
227.	JS Allexoise (11)	1–2	US Portes Hautes Cévennes (8)
228.	US Jassans (10)	3–1	FC Dombes-Bresse (8)
229.	AS Montmerle (10)	1–1 (4–5 p)	CS Viriat (8)
230.	Fareins Saône Vallée Foot (10)	1–4	US Feillens (8)
231.	FC Bord de Veyle (10)	2–4	Olympique Belleroche Villefranche (9)
232.	FC Lescheroux-St Julien-sur-Reyssouze (11)	2–8	Olympique St Denis-lès-Bourg (9)
233.	US Dombes-Chalamont (11)	1–4	FC La Vallière (9)
234.	AS Grièges-Pont-de-Veyle (11)	3–2	US Arbent Marchon (9)
235.	US Formans (11)	1–2	ES Foissiat-Étrez (9)
236.	US St Cyr (12)	0–4	FC Bressans (9)
237.	FC Veyle-Vieux-Jonc (12)	2–2 (1–4 p)	ES Lierguois (10)
238.	OS Pouilly-Pommiers (12)	1–4	CA St Georges-de-Reneins (11)
239.	AS Guéreins-Genouilleux (12)	2–4 (a.e.t.)	Entente Odenas-Charentay-St Lager (10)
240.	RC Beligny (12)	1–2	ES Val de Saône (10)
241.	US Marsonnas-Jayat-Béreyziat (12)	0–3	AS Bâgé-le-Châtel (10)
242.	FC Bords de l'Ain (11)	1–3	US Pont-de-Vaux-Arbigny (10)
243.	FC Curtafond-Confrançon-St Martin-St Didier (12)	1–3	FC Manziat (10)
244.	FC Haut Revermont (12)	0–3	ES Cormoranche (10)
245.	AS Peyrieu-Brens (13)	1–1 (5–3 p)	AS St Martin-du-Frêne/Maillat/Combe-du-Val (10)
246.	AS Arnas (12)	1–3	US Replonges (10)
247.	CS Reyrieux (13)	0–3	AS Sornins Réunis (11)
248.	FC Priay (12)	3–0	US Vonnas (11)
249.	CS Chevroux (12)	1–2	AS St Étienne-sur-Reyssouze (11)
250.	Entente Certines-La Tranclière-Tossiat-Journans (12)	2–3	AS Chaveyriat-Chanoz (11)
251.	AS Attignat (11)	2–1	Plaine Revermont Foot (11)
252.	US Vétraz (12)	2–5 (a.e.t.)	ES Ambronay-St Jean-le-Vieux (11)
253.	FC Alboussière (12)	0–1	US Pont-La Roche (9)
254.	AS St Barthélemy-Grozon (12)	2–3	FC Portois (10)
255.	AS Homenetmen Bourg-lès Valence (11)	3–1	RC Tournon-Tain (9)
256.	FC Dingy (11)	2–1	FC Vallée Verte (12)
257.	FC Vallon-Pont-d'Arc (11)	1–4 (Note: FC Tricastin penalised for fielding a suspended player. FC Vallon-Pont-d'Arc qualify for the second round.)	FC Tricastin (9)
258.	CS Malataverne (12)	1–4	FC Valdaine (9)
259.	PS Romanaise (11)	0–3	AS Valensolles (11)
260.	US Lasses (12)	1–5	FR Allan (10)
261.	FC Rambertois (11)	0–4	FC Bourg-lès-Valence (10)
262.	JS St Privat (11)	0–1 (a.e.t.)	FC Eyrieux Embroye (9)
263.	US Montmeyran (12)	0–0 (4–1 p)	ES Chomérac (10)
264.	FC St Dider-sous-Aubenas (13)	2–6	CO Donzère (12)
265.	Montagut FC (12)	1–6	Vivar SC Soyons (11)
266.	Glun FC (13)	1–5	FC Cheylarois (11)
267.	FC St Restitut (13)	1–3	Olympique St Montanais (11)
268.	JS Livron (12)	0–3	US Meysse (12)
269.	FC Pays de Bourdeaux (13)	3–4	FC Viviers (12)
270.	SC Bourguesan (12)	12–0	AS Vanséenne (12)
271.	US St Martin-de-Valamas (12)	3–1	ES Vesseaux (11)
272.	Loriol Passion FC (12)	1–2	US Ancône (12)
273.	Inter Haute Herbasse (13)	0–2	ES Malissardoise (12)
274.	FC Baume-Montségur (11)	1–2	AS Roussas-Granges-Gontardes (11)
275.	IF Barbières-Bésayes-Rochefort-Samson-Marches (13)	1–1 (5–3 p)	Espérance Hostunoise (11)
276.	FC Rochepaule (14)	1–3	ES St Jeure-d'Ay-Marsan (12)
277.	FC Voiron-Moirans (10)	3–3 (0–3 p)	SO Pont-de-Chéruy-Chavanoz (8)
278.	US Chartreuse Guiers (10)	0–3	Vallée du Guiers FC (8)
279.	US Pont-de-Beauvoisin Foot (9)	2–3	Nivolet FC (8)
280.	CS Vaulxois (12)	0–7	US Creys-Morestel (9)
281.	St Denis-Ambutrix FC (11)	1–10	US Grand Colombier (9)
282.	US Grand Mont La Bâthie (12)	2–5	ES Drumettaz-Mouxy (9)
283.	ASF Bourbre (13)	0–3	JA Heyrieux (10)
284.	US Montgasconnaise (12)	1–2	CS Verpillière (9)
285.	Formafoot Bièvre Valloire (11)	2–2 (4–3 p)	AS Diémoz (11)
286.	AS St André-le-Gaz (10)	5–1	St Alban Sportif (11)
287.	FC Lauzes (11)	1–4	FCO Chandieu (11)
288.	FC Nurieux-Volognat (11)	0–6	US Nantua (9)
289.	FC Marcellaz-Albanais (11)	0–1	FC Vuache (11)
290.	AS Valondras (12)	1–7	Artas-Charantonnay FC (11)
291.	Ascol Foot 38 (12)	1–2	AS Colomieu (12)
292.	JS Bettant (13)	2–3	FC Serrières-Villebois (11)
293.	US Beaurepairoise (12)	2–1	EF des Étangs (11)
294.	US Vaux-en-Bugey (12)	3–2	US Cassolards-Passageois (12)
295.	FC Marigny-St Marcel (12)	0–1	CA Yenne (11)
296.	SA St Agrève (12)	3–0	US Beaumont-lès-Valence
297.	US St Gervais-sur-Roubion (12)	0–4	AS Portugaise Valence (10)
298.	CS Four (12)	3–3 (1–3 p)	AS Montrevelloise (9)
299.	COS Montreynaud (12)	3–0	AS Diversité Villeurbanne (13)

== Framing round ==
=== Picardie ===
These matches were played on 21 August 2016.

Framing round results: Picardie

Tie no	Home team (tier)	Score	Away team (tier)
1.	CS Montescourt-Lizerolles (13)	1–1 (5–3 p)	FC Lesdins (10)
2.	FC St Just des Marais (12)	2–4	ESF Formerie (10)
3.	US Breuil-le-Sec (11)	3–3 (4–5 p)	ES Remy (12)
4.	Thury FC (13)	0–3	US Lamorlaye (9)
5.	Amiens FC (14)	1–2	ES Cagny (12)
6.	AS Airaines-Allery (9)	1–0	Amiens RIF (11)

=== Bourgogne ===
These matches were played on 21 August 2016.

Framing round results: Bourgogne

Tie no	Home team (tier)	Score	Away team (tier)
1.	ASUC Migennes (8)	8–0	FC Gatinais en Bourgogne (8)
2.	US Canton Charny (11)	0–2	CA St Georges (10)
3.	FC Chevannes (10)	7–1	St Fargeau SF (10)
4.	ES Lucenay/Cossay (10)	0–4	AS St Benin (8)
5.	US St Bonnet/La Guiche (8)	5–1	Sud Foot 71 (8)
6.	US Buxynoise (11)	2–4	JF Palingeois (8)
7.	US Cluny (8)	3–1 (a.e.t.)	FC La Roche-Vineuse (9)
8.	AS Tournus (11)	3–2	FC Hurigny (8)
9.	US Crissotine (9)	1–2	AS Châtenoy-le-Royal (8)
10.	FC Saulon-Corcelles (9)	0–1	AS Beaune (7)
11.	AS Igornay (10)	0–3	US Meursault (7)
12.	CL Marsannay-la-Côte (8)	0–3	Chevigny Saint Sauveur (7)
13.	UL Française Européenne Dijon (8)	1–1 (4–5 p)	Val de Norge FC (8)
