= 2017–18 Coupe de France preliminary rounds, overseas departments and territories =

The 2017–18 Coupe de France preliminary rounds, overseas departments and territories make up the qualifying competition to decide which teams from the French Overseas Departments and Territories take part in the main competition from the seventh round.

== Mayotte ==
=== First round ===
The matches in Mayotte were played on 18 February 2017. Tiers shown reflect the 2016–17 season.

First round results: Mayotte

Tie no	Home team (tier)	Score	Away team (tier)
1.	(Mayotte) USJ Tsararano (PH)	3–0	FC Mtsakandro (PH) (Mayotte)
2.	(Mayotte) USC Kangani (PH)	1–1 (5–4 p)	AJ Kani-Kéli (PH) (Mayotte)
3.	(Mayotte) FC Sohoa (DHT)	1–2	USC Anteou Poroani (PH) (Mayotte)
4.	(Mayotte) US Kavani (PH)	4–2	Choungui FC (PH) (Mayotte)
5.	(Mayotte) US Ouangani (DHT)	2–4	Olympique de Miréréni (PH) (Mayotte)
6.	(Mayotte) Enfant du Port (PH)	4–3	AS Papillon d'Honneur (PH) (Mayotte)
7.	(Mayotte) FCO Tsingoni (PH)	0–4	FC Chiconi (PH) (Mayotte)
8.	(Mayotte) Maharavou Sport (PH)	2–2 (3–2 p)	Tornade Club de Majicavo (PH) (Mayotte)
9.	Enfants de Mayotte (PH)	2–0	Feu du Centre (DHT) (Mayotte)
10.	(Mayotte) Racine du Nord (DHT)	1–0 (Note: US Bandrélé were penalised for fielding an ineligible player. Racine du Nord progress to the second round. Original scoreline 1–1 (3–4 p))	US Bandrélé (PH) (Mayotte)
11.	(Mayotte) RC Barakani (PH)	6–3 (a.e.t.)	USC Labattoir (PH) (Mayotte)
12.	(Mayotte) USCJ Koungou (DHT)	2–1	VCO Vahibé (DHT) (Mayotte)
13.	(Mayotte) FC Dembéni (PH)	2–4	Tchanga SC (DHT) (Mayotte)
14.	(Mayotte) Miracle du Sud (DHT)	3–1	Voulvavi Sports (PH) (Mayotte)
15.	(Mayotte) Missile Rouge (PH)	0–1	ASJ Moinatrindri (DHT) (Mayotte)

Note: Mayotte League structure (no promotion to French League structure):

- Division d'Honneur (DH)
- Division d'Honneur Territoriale (DHT)
- Promotion d'Honneur (PH)

=== Second round ===
These matches were played on 1 April 2017. Tiers shown reflect the 2016–17 season.

Second round results: Mayotte

Tie no	Home team (tier)	Score	Away team (tier)
1.	(Mayotte) FC Chiconi (PH)	4–0	ASC Wahadi (PH) (Mayotte)
2.	(Mayotte) Olympique de Miréréni (PH)	3–1	US Kavani (PH) (Mayotte)
3.	(Mayotte) CJ Mronabéja (PH)	1–0	ASJ Handréma (DH) (Mayotte)
4.	(Mayotte) ASCJ Alakarabu (PH)	0–6	Foudre 2000 (DH) (Mayotte)
5.	(Mayotte) FC Mtsapéré (DH)	0–0 (3–0 p)	Tchanga SC (DHT) (Mayotte)
6.	Enfants de Mayotte (PH)	3–1	USCJ Koungou (DHT) (Mayotte)
7.	(Mayotte) USC Anteou Poroani (PH)	0–1	AS Rosador (DH) (Mayotte)
8.	(Mayotte) Étincelles Hamjago (DH)	1–2	ASC Abeilles (DH) (Mayotte)
9.	(Mayotte) AS Neige (DH)	2–1 (a.e.t.)	AS Sada (DH) (Mayotte)
10.	(Mayotte) ASC Kawéni (DH)	2–2 (4–2 p)	FC Koropa (DH) (Mayotte)
11.	(Mayotte) USC Kangani (PH)	3–3 (4–3 p)	Enfant du Port (PH) (Mayotte)
12.	(Mayotte) ASJ Moinatrindri (DHT)	1–3	AS Jumeaux de M'zouazia (DH) (Mayotte)
13.	(Mayotte) Diables Noirs (DH)	4–0	Miracle du Sud (DHT) (Mayotte)
14.	(Mayotte) Racine du Nord (DHT)	5–2	RC Barakani (PH) (Mayotte)
15.	(Mayotte) UCS Sada (DHT)	4–1	Maharavou Sport (PH) (Mayotte)
16.	(Mayotte) USJ Tsararano (PH)	0–0 (4–3 p)	FC Labattoir (DHT) (Mayotte)

Note: Mayotte League structure (no promotion to French League structure):

- Division d'Honneur (DH)
- Division d'Honneur Territoriale (DHT)
- Promotion d'Honneur (PH)

=== Third round ===
These matches were played on 20 May 2017.

Third round results: Mayotte

Tie no	Home team (tier)	Score	Away team (tier)
1.	(Mayotte) USJ Tsararano (PH)	1–2	FC Chiconi (PH) (Mayotte)
2.	(Mayotte) USC Kangani (PH)	0–4	FC Mtsapéré (DH) (Mayotte)
3.	(Mayotte) Olympique de Miréréni (PH)	2–1	AS Rosador (DH) (Mayotte)
4.	(Mayotte) UCS Sada (DHT)	8–0	Racine du Nord (DHT) (Mayotte)
5.	Enfants de Mayotte (PH)	1–0	ASC Abeilles (DH) (Mayotte)
6.	(Mayotte) Foudre 2000 (DH)	5–3	AS Jumeaux de M'zouazia (DH) (Mayotte)
7.	(Mayotte) AS Neige (DH)	2–3	ASC Kawéni (DH) (Mayotte)
8.	(Mayotte) CJ Mronabéja (PH)	1–3	Diables Noirs (DH) (Mayotte)

Note: Mayotte League structure (no promotion to French League structure):

- Division d'Honneur (DH)
- Division d'Honneur Territoriale (DHT)
- Promotion d'Honneur (PH)

=== Fourth round ===
These matches were played on 8 July 2017.

Fourth round results: Mayotte

Tie no	Home team (tier)	Score	Away team (tier)
1.	(Mayotte) ASC Kawéni (DH)	0–1	FC Mtsapéré (DH) (Mayotte)
2.	Enfants de Mayotte (PH)	1–2	UCS Sada (DHT) (Mayotte)
3.	(Mayotte) FC Chiconi (PH)	0–5	Foudre 2000 (DH) (Mayotte)
4.	(Mayotte) Olympique de Miréréni (PH)	1–1 (2–4 p)	Diables Noirs (DH) (Mayotte)

Note: Mayotte League structure (no promotion to French League structure):

- Division d'Honneur (DH)
- Division d'Honneur Territoriale (DHT)
- Promotion d'Honneur (PH)

=== Fifth round ===
These matches were played on 2 September 2017.

Fifth round results: Mayotte

Tie no	Home team (tier)	Score	Away team (tier)
1.	(Mayotte) UCS Sada (DHT)	0–1	Diables Noirs (DH) (Mayotte)
2.	(Mayotte) Foudre 2000 (DH)	3–4	FC Mtsapéré (DH) (Mayotte)

Note: Mayotte League structure (no promotion to French League structure):

- Division d'Honneur (DH)
- Division d'Honneur Territoriale (DHT)
- Promotion d'Honneur (PH)

=== Sixth round ===
This match was played on 14 October 2017.

Sixth round Result: Mayotte

Tie no	Home team (tier)	Score	Away team (tier)
1.	(Mayotte) FC Mtsapéré (DH)	2–3	Diables Noirs (DH) (Mayotte)

Note: Mayotte League structure (no promotion to French League structure):

- Division d'Honneur (DH)
- Division d'Honneur Territoriale (DHT)
- Promotion d'Honneur (PH)

== Martinique ==
=== First round ===
This season, the preliminary rounds start with the second round.

These matches were played between 26 and 29 August 2017.

Second round results: Martinique

Tie no	Home team (tier)	Score	Away team (tier)
1.	(Martinique) Réveil Sportif (R3)	0–4	Good Luck (R1) (Martinique)
2.	(Martinique) CS Bélimois (R3)	0–3	Golden Star (R1) (Martinique)
3.	(Martinique) CS Case-Pilote (R1)	1–0	RC Lorrain (R2) (Martinique)
4.	(Martinique) AS New Club (R2)	1–2	La Gauloise de Trinité (R3) (Martinique)
5.	(Martinique) JS Marigot (R3)	2–5	Réal Tartane (R3) (Martinique)
6.	(Martinique) Étincelle Macouba (R3)	2–4	Etendard Bellefontaine (R3) (Martinique)
7.	(Martinique) US Marinoise (R2)	1–3	Club Péléen (R2) (Martinique)
8.	(Martinique) US Robert (R2)	3–0	UJ Redoute (R3) (Martinique)
9.	(Martinique) Eveil les Trois-Îlets (R3)	1–4	Emulation (R1) (Martinique)
10.	(Martinique) AS Morne-des-Esses (R3)	2–3	New Star Ducos (R1) (Martinique)
11.	(Martinique) AS Étoile Basse-Pointe (R2)	4–3	SC Lamentin (R3) (Martinique)
12.	(Martinique) AC Vert-Pré (R3)	5–0	Espoir Ste Luce (R3) (Martinique)
13.	(Martinique) CO Trenelle (R2)	1–2	CO Dillon-Ste Thérèse (R3) (Martinique)
14.	(Martinique) AS Excelsior (R2)	0–3	AS Eclair Rivière-Salée (R2) (Martinique)
15.	(Martinique) CSC Carbet (R3)	0–7	Aussaut de St Pierre (R2) (Martinique)
16.	(Martinique) Santana Club (R3)	5–0	L'Intrépide Club (R3) (Martinique)
17.	(Martinique) Anses Arlets FC (R3)	0–1	Oceanic Club (R3) (Martinique)
18.	(Martinique) Stade Spiritain (R3)	1–1 (6–7 p)	FEP Monésie (R2) (Martinique)
19.	(Martinique) ASC Hirondelle (R3)	2–1	AS Silver Star (R3) (Martinique)
20.	(Martinique) ASC Môn Pito (R3)	1–7	JS Eucalyptus (R1) (Martinique)
21.	(Martinique) Solidarité de Lestrade (R3)	5–2	ASC Eudorçait-Fourniols (R3) (Martinique)
22.	(Martinique) Olympique Le Marin (R3)	0–5	RC St Joseph (R1) (Martinique)
23.	(Martinique) Gri-Gri Pilotin FC (R3)	1–2	US Riveraine (R3) (Martinique)
24.	(Martinique) US Diamantinoise (R2)	6–5	CS Vauclinois (R2) (Martinique)

Note: Martinique League structure (no promotion to French League structure):

- Régionale 1 (R1)
- Régionale 2 (R2)
- Régionale 3 (R3)

=== Second round ===
These matches were played on 8, 9 and 10 September 2017.

Third round results: Martinique

Tie no	Home team (tier)	Score	Away team (tier)
1.	(Martinique) Club Péléen (R2)	5–0	US Riveraine (R3) (Martinique)
2.	(Martinique) AS Eclair Rivière-Salée (R2)	5–0	ASC Hirondelle (R3) (Martinique)
3.	(Martinique) Oceanic Club (R3)	0–1	Club Colonial (R1) (Martinique)
4.	(Martinique) AS Samaritaine (R1)	5–1	US Diamantinoise (R2) (Martinique)
5.	(Martinique) UJ Monnérot (R2)	6–0	Solidarité de Lestrade (R3) (Martinique)
6.	(Martinique) La Gauloise de Trinité (R3)	1–2	Good Luck (R1) (Martinique)
7.	(Martinique) CS Case-Pilote (R1)	1–4	Golden Lion FC (R1) (Martinique)
8.	(Martinique) Etendard Bellefontaine (R3)	1–5	JS Eucalyptus (R1) (Martinique)
9.	(Martinique) FEP Monésie (R2)	1–2	Golden Star (R1) (Martinique)
10.	(Martinique) Essor-Préchotain (R1)	3–2	US Robert (R2) (Martinique)
11.	(Martinique) Aussaut de St Pierre (R2)	1–4	New Star Ducos (R1) (Martinique)
12.	(Martinique) CO Dillon-Ste Thérèse (R3)	0–8	RC St Joseph (R1) (Martinique)
13.	(Martinique) AS Étoile Basse-Pointe (R2)	0–1	Club Franciscain (R1) (Martinique)
14.	(Martinique) AC Vert-Pré (R3)	0–3	Aiglon du Lamentin (R1) (Martinique)
15.	(Martinique) Santana Club (R3)	0–1	Emulation (R1) (Martinique)
16.	(Martinique) Réal Tartane (R3)	1–1 (3–4 p)	RC Rivière-Pilote (R1) (Martinique)

Note: Martinique League structure (no promotion to French League structure):

- Régionale 1 (R1)
- Régionale 2 (R2)
- Régionale 3 (R3)

=== Third round ===
These matches were played on 23 and 24 September 2017.

Fourth round results: Martinique

Tie no	Home team (tier)	Score	Away team (tier)
1.	(Martinique) JS Eucalyptus (R1)	1–4	Golden Lion FC (R1) (Martinique)
2.	(Martinique) RC Rivière-Pilote (R1)	8–0	Club Péléen (R2) (Martinique)
3.	(Martinique) Good Luck (R1)	4–2	Golden Star (R1) (Martinique)
4.	(Martinique) New Star Ducos (R1)	2–1	RC St Joseph (R1) (Martinique)
5.	(Martinique) Emulation (R1)	1–2	Club Colonial (R1) (Martinique)
6.	(Martinique) Aiglon du Lamentin (R1)	3–1	AS Samaritaine (R1) (Martinique)
7.	(Martinique) UJ Monnérot (R2)	0–0 (6–5 p)	Essor-Préchotain (R1) (Martinique)
8.	(Martinique) Club Franciscain (R1)	3–0	AS Eclair Rivière-Salée (R2) (Martinique)

Note: Martinique League structure (no promotion to French League structure):

- Régionale 1 (R1)
- Régionale 2 (R2)
- Régionale 3 (R3)

=== Fourth round ===
These matches were played on 23 and 24 September 2017.

Fourth round results: Martinique

Tie no	Home team (tier)	Score	Away team (tier)
1.	(Martinique) JS Eucalyptus (R1)	1–4	Golden Lion FC (R1) (Martinique)
2.	(Martinique) RC Rivière-Pilote (R1)	8–0	Club Péléen (R2) (Martinique)
3.	(Martinique) Good Luck (R1)	4–2	Golden Star (R1) (Martinique)
4.	(Martinique) New Star Ducos (R1)	2–1	RC St Joseph (R1) (Martinique)
5.	(Martinique) Emulation (R1)	1–2	Club Colonial (R1) (Martinique)
6.	(Martinique) Aiglon du Lamentin (R1)	3–1	AS Samaritaine (R1) (Martinique)
7.	(Martinique) UJ Monnérot (R2)	0–0 (6–5 p)	Essor-Préchotain (R1) (Martinique)
8.	(Martinique) Club Franciscain (R1)	3–0	AS Eclair Rivière-Salée (R2) (Martinique)

Note: Martinique League structure (no promotion to French League structure):

- Régionale 1 (R1)
- Régionale 2 (R2)
- Régionale 3 (R3)

=== Fifth round ===
These matches were played on 10 and 11 October 2017.

Fifth round results: Martinique

Tie no	Home team (tier)	Score	Away team (tier)
1.	(Martinique) Golden Lion FC (R1)	1–0	RC Rivière-Pilote (R1) (Martinique)
2.	(Martinique) Club Franciscain (R1)	3–0	New Star Ducos (R1) (Martinique)
3.	(Martinique) Good Luck (R1)	5–2	UJ Monnérot (R2) (Martinique)
4.	(Martinique) Club Colonial (R1)	2–1	Aiglon du Lamentin (R1) (Martinique)

Note: Martinique League structure (no promotion to French League structure):

- Régionale 1 (R1)
- Régionale 2 (R2)
- Régionale 3 (R3)

=== Sixth round ===
These matches were played on 20 and 21 October 2017.

Sixth round results: Martinique

Tie no	Home team (tier)	Score	Away team (tier)
1.	(Martinique) Club Colonial (R1)	1–0	Club Franciscain (R1) (Martinique)
2.	(Martinique) Golden Lion FC (R1)	4–0	Good Luck (R1) (Martinique)

Note: Martinique League structure (no promotion to French League structure):

- Régionale 1 (R1)
- Régionale 2 (R2)
- Régionale 3 (R3)

== Guadeloupe ==
=== Second round ===
This season, the preliminary rounds start with the second round.

These matches were played between 25 and 27 August 2017.

Second round results: Guadeloupe

Tie no	Home team (tier)	Score	Away team (tier)
1.	(Guadeloupe) CS Bouillantais (R2)	1–5	AO Gourbeyrienne (R1) (Guadeloupe)
2.	(Guadeloupe) Colonial Club (R2)	1–4	Dynamo Le Moule (R2) (Guadeloupe)
3.	(Guadeloupe) JS Abymienne (R2)	2–0	CS St François (R2) (Guadeloupe)
4.	(Guadeloupe) CA Marquisat (R2)	1–2	Red Star (R2) (Guadeloupe)
5.	(Guadeloupe) JS Vieux-Habitants (R2)	0–1 (a.e.t.)	Rapid Club (R2) (Guadeloupe)
6.	(Guadeloupe) AS Nenuphars (R2)	1–2	Cactus Ste Anne (R2) (Guadeloupe)
7.	(Guadeloupe) AS Dragon (R3)	0–3	Stade Lamentinois (R2) (Guadeloupe)
8.	(Guadeloupe) JTR Trois Rivières (R3)	0–3	AJ St Félix (R3) (Guadeloupe)
9.	(Guadeloupe) ASC Madiana (R2)	9–0	Avenir Ste Rosien (R2) (Guadeloupe)
10.	(Guadeloupe) US Grande Bourgeoise (R3)	2–0	JSC Marie Galante (R2) (Guadeloupe)
11.	(Guadeloupe) L'Éclair de Petit-Bourg (R2)	2–1	ASC La Frégate (R2) (Guadeloupe)
12.	(Guadeloupe) AS Moule (R3)	0–2	Association Juvenis (R2) (Guadeloupe)
13.	(Guadeloupe) AS Le Gosier (R2)	6–0	St Claude FC (R3) (Guadeloupe)
14.	(Guadeloupe) Mondial Club (R3)	0–2	Jeunesse Evolution (R2) (Guadeloupe)
15.	(Guadeloupe) Alliance FC (R3)	1–2	SC Baie-Mahault (R2) (Guadeloupe)
16.	(Guadeloupe) Étoile de l'Ouest (R2)	3–7	AS Cygne Noir (R2) (Guadeloupe)

Note: Guadeloupe League structure (no promotion to French League structure):

- Ligue Régionale 1 (R1)
- Ligue Régionale 2 (R2)
- Ligue Régionale 3 (R3)

=== Third round ===
These matches were played between 12 and 23 September 2017.

Third round results: Guadeloupe

Tie no	Home team (tier)	Score	Away team (tier)
1.	(Guadeloupe) AJ St Félix (R3)	1–10	Unité Ste Rosienne (R1) (Guadeloupe)
2.	(Guadeloupe) AO Gourbeyrienne (R1)	1–2	Arsenal Club (R1) (Guadeloupe)
3.	(Guadeloupe) CS Capesterre-Belle-Eau (R1)	0–2	Stade Lamentinois (R2) (Guadeloupe)
4.	(Guadeloupe) Union des Artistes de Raizet (R2)	0–4	CS Moulien (R1) (Guadeloupe)
5.	(Guadeloupe) ASG Juventus de Sainte-Anne (R1)	1–0	Rapid Club (R2) (Guadeloupe)
6.	(Guadeloupe) Cactus Ste Anne (R2)	3–1	JS Abymienne (R2) (Guadeloupe)
7.	(Guadeloupe) Red Star (R2)	2–1	La Gauloise de Basse-Terre (R1) (Guadeloupe)
8.	(Guadeloupe) Dynamo Le Moule (R2)	3–0	Phare du Canal (R1) (Guadeloupe)
9.	(Guadeloupe) US Baie-Mahault (R1)	1–3	Racing Club de Basse-Terre (R1) (Guadeloupe)
10.	(Guadeloupe) ASC Siroco Les Abymes (R1)	0–1	L'Etoile de Morne-à-l'Eau (R1) (Guadeloupe)
11.	(Guadeloupe) US Grande Bourgeoise (R3)	1–5	Solidarité-Scolaire (R1) (Guadeloupe)
12.	(Guadeloupe) Jeunesse Evolution (R2)	5–3 (a.e.t.)	Evolucas Lamentin (R2) (Guadeloupe)
13.	(Guadeloupe) SC Baie-Mahault (R2)	3–1	AS Cygne Noir (R2) (Guadeloupe)
14.	(Guadeloupe) Amical Club Marie Galante (R1)	0–3	AS Le Gosier (R2) (Guadeloupe)
15.	(Guadeloupe) ASC Madiana (R2)	1–3	USC de Bananier (R2) (Guadeloupe)
16.	(Guadeloupe) Association Juvenis (R2)	2–3	L'Éclair de Petit-Bourg (R2) (Guadeloupe)

Note: Guadeloupe League structure (no promotion to French League structure):

- Ligue Régionale 1 (R1)
- Ligue Régionale 2 (R2)
- Ligue Régionale 3 (R3)

=== Fourth round ===
These matches were played between 26 September and 11 October 2017.

Fourth round results: Guadeloupe

Tie no	Home team (tier)	Score	Away team (tier)
1.	(Guadeloupe) Unité Ste Rosienne (R1)	2–1	Cactus Ste Anne (R2) (Guadeloupe)
2.	(Guadeloupe) Arsenal Club (R1)	0–5	CS Moulien (R1) (Guadeloupe)
3.	(Guadeloupe) Stade Lamentinois (R2)	1–2	Red Star (R2) (Guadeloupe)
4.	(Guadeloupe) Dynamo Le Moule (R2)	1–5	ASG Juventus de Sainte-Anne (R1) (Guadeloupe)
5.	(Guadeloupe) USC de Bananier (R2)	1–0	L'Éclair de Petit-Bourg (R2) (Guadeloupe)
6.	(Guadeloupe) Racing Club de Basse-Terre (R1)	1–1 (4–2 p)	AS Le Gosier (R2) (Guadeloupe)
7.	(Guadeloupe) Solidarité-Scolaire (R1)	0–1	L'Etoile de Morne-à-l'Eau (R1) (Guadeloupe)
8.	(Guadeloupe) SC Baie-Mahault (R2)	1–1 (10–9 p)	Jeunesse Evolution (R2) (Guadeloupe)

Note: Guadeloupe League structure (no promotion to French League structure):

- Ligue Régionale 1 (R1)
- Ligue Régionale 2 (R2)
- Ligue Régionale 3 (R3)

=== Fifth round ===
These matches were played between 11 and 22 October 2017.

Fifth round results: Guadeloupe

Tie no	Home team (tier)	Score	Away team (tier)
1.	(Guadeloupe) CS Moulien (R1)	1–0 (a.e.t.)	ASG Juventus de Sainte-Anne (R1) (Guadeloupe)
2.	(Guadeloupe) Unité Ste Rosienne (R1)	1–1 (3–1 p)	Red Star (R2) (Guadeloupe)
3.	(Guadeloupe) SC Baie-Mahault (R2)	1–0	USC de Bananier (R2) (Guadeloupe)
4.	(Guadeloupe) L'Etoile de Morne-à-l'Eau (R1)	1–0	Racing Club de Basse-Terre (R1) (Guadeloupe)

Note: Guadeloupe League structure (no promotion to French League structure):

- Ligue Régionale 1 (R1)
- Ligue Régionale 2 (R2)
- Ligue Régionale 3 (R3)

=== Sixth round ===
These matches were played between 18 and 25 October 2017.

Sixth round results: Guadeloupe

Tie no	Home team (tier)	Score	Away team (tier)
1.	(Guadeloupe) Unité Ste Rosienne (R1)	0-1	CS Moulien (R1) (Guadeloupe)
2.	(Guadeloupe) SC Baie-Mahault (R2)	0–4	L'Etoile de Morne-à-l'Eau (R1) (Guadeloupe)

Note: Guadeloupe League structure (no promotion to French League structure):

- Ligue Régionale 1 (R1)
- Ligue Régionale 2 (R2)
- Ligue Régionale 3 (R3)

== French Guiana ==
=== Third round ===
This season, the preliminary rounds start with the third round.

These matches were played between 23 August and 2 September 2017.

Third round results: French Guiana

Tie no	Home team (tier)	Score	Away team (tier)
1.	(French Guiana) Le Geldar De Kourou (R1)	2–0 (a.e.t.)	ASC Kawina (none) (French Guiana)
2.	(French Guiana) Olympique Cayenne (R1)	2–3	USC Montsinery (R2) (French Guiana)
3.	(French Guiana) US St-Elie (R2)	0–6	CSC Cayenne (R1) (French Guiana)
4.	(French Guiana) FC Renaissance (R2)	1–2	Dynamo De Soula (R2) (French Guiana)
5.	(French Guiana) AOJ Mana (R2)	2–2 (4–3 p)	Cosma Foot (R2) (French Guiana)
6.	(French Guiana) ASC Ouest (R2)	3–0	AJS Maroni (R2) (French Guiana)
7.	(French Guiana) FC Oyapock (R2)	2–1	USL Montjoly (R2) (French Guiana)
8.	(French Guiana) EF Iracoubo (R1)	0–2	ASE Matoury (R1) (French Guiana)
9.	(French Guiana) US Macouria (R2)	0–5	ASL Sport Guyanais (R2) (French Guiana)
10.	(French Guiana) Kourou FC (R1)	3–0	ASCS Maripasoula (none) (French Guiana)
11.	(French Guiana) ASC Karib (R2)	2–6	US Sinnamary (R1) (French Guiana)
12.	(French Guiana) ASU Grand Santi (R1)	1–2	ASC Agouado (R1) (French Guiana)
13.	(French Guiana) AJ Balata Abriba (R2)	1–0	USC De Roura (R2) (French Guiana)
14.	(French Guiana) AJ Saint-Georges (R1)	0–1	ASC Remire (R1) (French Guiana)

Note: French Guiana League structure (no promotion to French League structure):

- Regional 1 (R1)
- Regional 2 (R2)

=== Fourth round ===
These matches were played between 8 and 12 September 2017.

Fourth round results: French Guiana

Tie no	Home team (tier)	Score	Away team (tier)
1.	(French Guiana) CSC Cayenne (R1)	3–1	ASL Sport Guyanais (R2) (French Guiana)
2.	(French Guiana) ASE Matoury (R1)	3–0	ASC Agouado (R1) (French Guiana)
3.	(French Guiana) ASC Remire (R1)	1–3	FC Oyapock (R2) (French Guiana)
4.	(French Guiana) USC Montsinery (R2)	1–2	ASC Ouest (R2) (French Guiana)
5.	(French Guiana) US Sinnamary (R1)	3–0	Dynamo De Soula (R2) (French Guiana)
6.	(French Guiana) Kourou FC (R1)	2–3	ASC Le Geldar (R1) (French Guiana)
7.	(French Guiana) AOJ Mana (R2)	0–3 (Note: Game was not played due to the pitch not being prepared. AOJ Mana penalised. SC Kourocien qualify for the fifth round.)	SC Kouroucien (R1) (French Guiana)
8.	(French Guiana) US de Matoury (R1)	5–0	AJ Balata Abriba (R2) (French Guiana)

Note: French Guiana League structure (no promotion to French League structure):

- Regional 1 (R1)
- Regional 2 (R2)

=== Fifth round ===
These matches were played between 28 and 30 September 2017.

Fifth round results: French Guiana

Tie no	Home team (tier)	Score	Away team (tier)
1.	(French Guiana) SC Kouroucien (R1)	1–1 (2–4 p)	CSC Cayenne (R1) (French Guiana)
2.	(French Guiana) ASC Ouest (R2)	2–7	ASC Le Geldar (R1) (French Guiana)
3.	(French Guiana) US de Matoury (R1)	6–1	US Sinnamary (R1) (French Guiana)
4.	(French Guiana) FC Oyapock (R2)	3–5	ASE Matoury (R1) (French Guiana)

Note: French Guiana League structure (no promotion to French League structure):

- Regional 1 (R1)
- Regional 2 (R2)

=== Sixth round ===
These matches were played on 13 and 14 October 2017.

Sixth round results: French Guiana

Tie no	Home team (tier)	Score	Away team (tier)
1.	(French Guiana) US de Matoury (R1)	1–1 (4–5 p)	ASE Matoury (R1) (French Guiana)
2.	(French Guiana) CSC Cayenne (R1)	1–4	ASC Le Geldar (R1) (French Guiana)

Note: French Guiana League structure (no promotion to French League structure):

- Regional 1 (R1)
- Regional 2 (R2)

== Réunion ==
=== Third round ===
This season, the preliminary rounds start with the third round, equivalent to the 1/8^{th} final of the regional competition, which is divided into two sections.

These matches were played between 7 and 9 July 2017.

Third round results: Réunion

Tie no	Home team (tier)	Score	Away team (tier)
1.	(Réunion) AS Bretagne (R2)	0–1	AS Saint-Louisienne (R1) (Réunion)
2.	(Réunion) Saint-Pauloise FC (R1)	2–1	FC Bagatelle Sainte-Suzanne (R2) (Réunion)
3.	(Réunion) AS Marsouins (R1)	4–2	FC Parfin Saint-Andre (R2) (Réunion)
4.	(Réunion) FC Panonnais (R2)	0–1	JS Piton St Leu (R2) (Réunion)
5.	(Réunion) US Bellemène Canot (R2)	1–5	OC St André les Léopards (R1) (Réunion)
6.	(Réunion) AS Etoile du Sud (D2D)	1–12	AS Excelsior (R1) (Réunion)
7.	(Réunion) ASC Grands Bois (R1)	1–0	Trois Bassins FC (R1) (Réunion)
8.	(Réunion) AJS de l'Ouest (R2)	0–2	JS Saint-Pierroise (R1) (Réunion)
9.	(Réunion) Saint-Denis FC (R1)	0–0 (4–3 p)	AS Grand Fond (R2) (Réunion)
10.	(Réunion) AS Capricorne (R2)	1–0	FC Ligne Paradis (R2) (Réunion)
11.	(Réunion) AJ Petite-Île (R1)	2–1	ES Etang Sale (R2) (Réunion)
12.	(Réunion) La Tamponnaise (R2)	6–0	AF Saint-Louisien (R2) (Réunion)
13.	(Réunion) AFC Halte-La (D2D)	0–2	SS Jeanne d'Arc (R1) (Réunion)
14.	(Réunion) CO St Pierre (R2)	2–1	AS Sainte-Suzanne (R1) (Réunion)
15.	(Réunion) Saint Denis EDFA (R1)	2–1	FC Plaine des Grègues (R2) (Réunion)
16.	(Réunion) US Sainte-Marienne (R1)	7–0	AS St Philippe (R2) (Réunion)

Note: Reúnion League structure (no promotion to French League structure):

- Régionale 1 (R1)
- Régionale 2 (R2)
- D2 Départemental (D2D)

=== Fourth round ===
These matches were played on 16 and 23 August 2017.

Fourth round results: Réunion

Tie no	Home team (tier)	Score	Away team (tier)
1.	(Réunion) AS Excelsior (R1)	4–1	AS Saint-Louisienne (R1) (Réunion)
2.	(Réunion) JS Saint-Pierroise (R1)	2–1	JS Piton St Leu (R2) (Réunion)
3.	(Réunion) Saint-Pauloise FC (R1)	3–1	AS Marsouins (R1) (Réunion)
4.	(Réunion) ASC Grands Bois (R1)	2–0	OC St André les Léopards (R1) (Réunion)
5.	(Réunion) Saint-Denis FC (R1)	0–1	La Tamponnaise (R2) (Réunion)
6.	(Réunion) AS Capricorne (R2)	0–1	SS Jeanne d'Arc (R1) (Réunion)
7.	(Réunion) AJ Petite-Île (R1)	2–1	Saint Denis EDFA (R1) (Réunion)
8.	(Réunion) CO St Pierre (R2)	1–2	US Sainte-Marienne (R1) (Réunion)

Note: Reúnion League structure (no promotion to French League structure):

- Régionale 1 (R1)
- Régionale 2 (R2)
- D2 Départemental (D2D)

=== Fifth round ===
These matches were played on 27 September 2017.

Fifth round results: Réunion

Tie no	Home team (tier)	Score	Away team (tier)
1.	(Réunion) JS Saint-Pierroise (R1)	3–0	Saint-Pauloise FC (R1) (Réunion)
2.	(Réunion) AS Excelsior (R1)	3–0	ASC Grands Bois (R1) (Réunion)
3.	(Réunion) US Sainte-Marienne (R1)	1–2	La Tamponnaise (R2) (Réunion)
4.	(Réunion) AJ Petite-Île (R1)	1–1 (4–3 p)	SS Jeanne d'Arc (R1) (Réunion)

Note: Reúnion League structure (no promotion to French League structure):
- Régionale 1 (R1)
- Régionale 2 (R2)
- D2 Départemental (D2D)

=== Sixth round ===
These matches were played on 21 and 22 October 2017.

Sixth round results: Réunion

Tie no	Home team (tier)	Score	Away team (tier)
1.	(Réunion) AS Excelsior (R1)	1–0	JS Saint-Pierroise (R1) (Réunion)
2.	(Réunion) AJ Petite-Île (R1)	1–0	La Tamponnaise (R2) (Réunion)

Note: Reúnion League structure (no promotion to French League structure):

- Régionale 1 (R1)
- Régionale 2 (R2)
- D2 Départemental (D2D)

== See also ==
- Overseas France teams in the main competition of the Coupe de France
