= 2024–25 Coupe de France preliminary rounds, overseas departments and territories =

The 2024–25 Coupe de France preliminary rounds, overseas departments and territories made up the qualifying competition to decide which teams from the French Overseas Departments and Territories took part in the main competition from the seventh round.

A total of eleven clubs were due to qualify from the overseas leagues, two each from Guadeloupe, French Guiana, Martinique, Réunion, and one each from Mayotte, New Caledonia and Tahiti. However, due to unrest in New Caledonia, no qualifying competition took place, and no representative was selected for the main competition.

In 2023–24, Golden Lion FC from Martinique and CS Moulien from Guadeloupe both made it to the eighth round. Golden Lion lost 12–0 to Ligue 1 side Lille OSC, whilst CS Moulien lost 4–0 to SO Romorantin of the Championnat National 2.

== Mayotte ==
On 23 April 2024, the Mayotte league announced the structure of the competition, and the draws for the first three rounds, confirming that 81 teams would take part. This would see 30 clubs from the third and fourth tier enter at the first round stage, with 3 given byes. The teams from the second tier were added to the draw with the winners and byes from the first round, and two ties were drawn to allow for the correct number of qualifiers for the third round, where the top tier clubs entered the competition. The round of 32 draw was published on 18 June 2024. The draw for the remaining rounds were published on 2 August 2024.

=== Framing round (Mayotte) ===
These matches were played on 28 April 2024. RC Tsimkoura, AS Tour Eiffel and ASJ Moinatrindri were drawn to receive byes to the next round.

Framing round results: Mayotte
Tie no	Home team (Tier)	Score	Away team (Tier)
1.	(Mayotte) Flamme d'Hajangoua (R4)	0–1	AS Papillon d'Honneur (R4) (Mayotte)
2.	(Mayotte) M'Tsanga 2000 (R4)	2–1	US Mtsangamboua (R4) (Mayotte)
3.	(Mayotte) N'Drema Club (R4)	2–3	AS Ongojou (R4) (Mayotte)
4.	(Mayotte) Feu du Centre (R4)	7–1	ASC Wahadi (R4) (Mayotte)
5.	(Mayotte) CJ Mronabéja (R4)	4–1	Voulvavi Sport & Culture (R4) (Mayotte)
6.	(Mayotte) US d'Acoua (R4)	1–3	RC Barakani (R4) (Mayotte)
7.	(Mayotte) ACSJ Alakarabu (R3)	3–5	Enfant du Port (R4) (Mayotte)
8.	(Mayotte) ASSO Club Mirereni (R4)	3–0 (Note: Tie won by means of forfeit.)	ÉF Wana Simba (R4) (Mayotte)
9.	(Mayotte) Association Himidiya (R4)	3–0	ÉF Papillon Bleu (R4) (Mayotte)
10.	(Mayotte) Tornade Club de Majicavo-Lamir (R4)	0–2	AS Defense de Kawéni (R4) (Mayotte)
11.	(Mayotte) US Ouangani (R4)	1–5	AOE Chiconi (R4) (Mayotte)
12.	(Mayotte) FC Bambo (R4)	0–3	Trévani SC (R4) (Mayotte)
13.	(Mayotte) FC Passi M'Bouini (R4)	0–2	USC Kangani (R4) (Mayotte)
14.	(Mayotte) USJ Tsararano (R4)	0–5	Espoir Mtsapéré (R4) (Mayotte)
15.	(Mayotte) FC Bouyouni (R4)	3–1 (Note: FC Bouyouni penalised, Maharavo FC qualify.)	Maharavo FC (R4) (Mayotte)

Note: Mayotte League Structure (no promotion to French League Structure):
Régionale 1 (R1)
Régionale 2 (R2)
Régionale 3 (R3)
Régionale 4 (R4)

=== Second round (Mayotte) ===
These matches were played on 8 May 2024.

Second round results: Mayotte
Tie no	Home team (Tier)	Score	Away team (Tier)
1.	(Mayotte) Olympique Mirereni (R3)	2–2 (3–2 p)	Racine du Nord (R4) (Mayotte)
2.	(Mayotte) Enfant du Port (R4)	2–3	Espérance d'Iloni (R2) (Mayotte)

Note: Mayotte League Structure (no promotion to French League Structure):
Régionale 1 (R1)
Régionale 2 (R2)
Régionale 3 (R3)
Régionale 4 (R4)

=== Third round (Mayotte) ===
These matches were played on 8, 9 and 17 June 2024.

Third round results: Mayotte
Tie no	Home team (Tier)	Score	Away team (Tier)
1.	(Mayotte) Association Himidiya (R4)	0–6	ASC Abeilles (R2) (Mayotte)
2.	(Mayotte) FC Kani-Bé (R3)	0–3	Bandrélé FC (R1) (Mayotte)
3.	(Mayotte) Espoir Club de Longoni (R3)	3–3 (2–3 p)	Feu du Centre (R4) (Mayotte)
4.	(Mayotte) UCS Sada (R1)	2–1	USC Anteou Poroani (R2) (Mayotte)
5.	(Mayotte) AS Bandraboua (R3)	1–1 (2–3 p)	Tchanga SC (R2) (Mayotte)
6.	(Mayotte) AJ Kani-Kéli (R1)	2–1	FC Dembeni (R2) (Mayotte)
7.	(Mayotte) M'Tsanga 2000 (R4)	1–1 (4–5 p)	Foudre 2000 de Dzoumogné (R1) (Mayotte)
8.	(Mayotte) FC Chiconi (R3)	1–2	ASC Kaweni (R1) (Mayotte)
9.	(Mayotte) Maharavo FC (R4)	0–1	FC Shingabwé (R3) (Mayotte)
10.	(Mayotte) Pamandzi SC (R3)	0–0 (3–5 p)	USC Kangani (R4) (Mayotte)
11.	(Mayotte) CJ Mronabéja (R4)	0–0 (5–6 p)	AS Sada (R2) (Mayotte)
12.	(Mayotte) FC Mtsapéré (R1)	2–0	ASJ Handréma (R1) (Mayotte)
13.	(Mayotte) RC Barakani (R4)	2–1 (Note: RC Barakani penalised, AS Defense de Kawéni qualify.)	AS Defense de Kawéni (R4) (Mayotte)
14.	(Mayotte) FCO Tsingoni (R3)	1–1 (2–3 p)	AS Papillon d'Honneur (R4) (Mayotte)
15.	(Mayotte) VCO Vahibé (R3)	0–2	Diables Noirs (R1) (Mayotte)
16.	(Mayotte) Espérance d'Iloni (R2)	2–1	Olympique Mirereni (R3) (Mayotte)
17.	(Mayotte) M'Tsamboro FC (R2)	0–1	ASCEE Nyambadao (R3) (Mayotte)
18.	(Mayotte) AS Rosador (R1)	6–0	FC Majicavo (R2) (Mayotte)
19.	(Mayotte) AS Tour Eiffel (R4)	5–3	VSS Hagnoudrou (R3) (Mayotte)
20.	(Mayotte) FC Ylang de Koungou (R3)	3–1	US Momoju (R3) (Mayotte)
21.	(Mayotte) Lance Missile (R3)	2–3	FC Sohoa (R2) (Mayotte)
22.	(Mayotte) AS Ongojou (R4)	2–2 (0–3 p)	Trévani SC (R4) (Mayotte)
23.	(Mayotte) US Bandréle (R3)	3–1	Choungui FC (R2) (Mayotte)
24.	(Mayotte) RC Tsimkoura (R4)	0–2	USC Labattoir (R3) (Mayotte)
25.	(Mayotte) FC Labattoir (R3)	1–0	USCJ Koungou (R3) (Mayotte)
26.	(Mayotte) ASJ Moinatrindri (R4)	2–2 (3–4 p)	AS Neige (R3) (Mayotte)
27.	(Mayotte) Miracle du Sud (R3)	3–0 (Note: Tie won by means of forfeit.)	FMJ Vahibé (R1) (Mayotte)
28.	(Mayotte) Etincelles Hamjago (R3)	2–4	AS Kahani (R3) (Mayotte)
29.	Enfants de Mayotte (R2)	2–4	US Kavani (R1) (Mayotte)
30.	(Mayotte) AOE Chiconi (R4)	3–0	ASSO Club Mirereni (R4) (Mayotte)
31.	(Mayotte) Espoir Mtsapéré (R4)	1–3	AS Jumeaux de Mzouazia (R1) (Mayotte)
32.	(Mayotte) AJ Mtsahara (R2)	0–0 (4–5 p)	ACSJ M'Liha (R2) (Mayotte)

Note: Mayotte League Structure (no promotion to French League Structure):
Régionale 1 (R1)
Régionale 2 (R2)
Régionale 3 (R3)
Régionale 4 (R4)

=== Round of 32 (Mayotte) ===
These matches were played on 13 and 14 July and 10 August 2024.

Round of 32 results: Mayotte
Tie no	Home team (Tier)	Score	Away team (Tier)
1.	(Mayotte) USC Labattoir (R3)	3–0	FC Sohoa (R2) (Mayotte)
2.	(Mayotte) AS Tour Eiffel (R4)	1–2	Tchanga SC (R2) (Mayotte)
3.	(Mayotte) Miracle du Sud (R3)	1–1 (3–2 p)	ASC Kaweni (R1) (Mayotte)
4.	(Mayotte) ASCEE Nyambadao (R3)	1–2	AJ Kani-Kéli (R1) (Mayotte)
5.	(Mayotte) US Bandréle (R3)	1–0	FC Labattoir (R3) (Mayotte)
6.	(Mayotte) AOE Chiconi (R4)	3–0	AS Defense de Kawéni (R4) (Mayotte)
7.	(Mayotte) AS Sada (R2)	1–3	AS Jumeaux de Mzouazia (R1) (Mayotte)
8.	(Mayotte) US Kavani (R1)	0–1	ACSJ M'Liha (R2) (Mayotte)
9.	(Mayotte) Bandrélé FC (R1)	2–2 (4–2 p)	Espérance d'Iloni (R2) (Mayotte)
10.	(Mayotte) FC Shingabwé (R3)	0–4	Trévani SC (R4) (Mayotte)
11.	(Mayotte) AS Neige (R3)	5–1	FC Ylang de Koungou (R3) (Mayotte)
12.	(Mayotte) Foudre 2000 de Dzoumogné (R1)	0–2	FC Mtsapéré (R1) (Mayotte)
13.	(Mayotte) AS Kahani (R3)	0–2	UCS Sada (R1) (Mayotte)
14.	(Mayotte) USC Kangani (R4)	0–2	Diables Noirs (R1) (Mayotte)
15.	(Mayotte) AS Papillon d'Honneur (R4)	1–1 (2–4 p)	AS Rosador (R1) (Mayotte)
16.	(Mayotte) Feu du Centre (R4)	0–0 (4–1 p)	ASC Abeilles (R2) (Mayotte)

Note: Mayotte League Structure (no promotion to French League Structure):
Régionale 1 (R1)
Régionale 2 (R2)
Régionale 3 (R3)
Régionale 4 (R4)

=== Round of 16 (Mayotte) ===
These matches were played on 10, 11 and 15 August 2024.

Round of 16 results: Mayotte
Tie no	Home team (Tier)	Score	Away team (Tier)
1.	(Mayotte) USC Labattoir (R3)	1–1 (4–3 p)	FC Mtsapéré (R1) (Mayotte)
2.	(Mayotte) Diables Noirs (R1)	2–1	AS Jumeaux de Mzouazia (R1) (Mayotte)
3.	(Mayotte) AOE Chiconi (R4)	2–2 (4–2 p)	AJ Kani-Kéli (R1) (Mayotte)
4.	(Mayotte) AS Rosador (R1)	0–0 (3–0 p)	ACSJ M'Liha (R2) (Mayotte)
5.	(Mayotte) Tchanga SC (R2)	1–1 (3–4 p)	AS Neige (R3) (Mayotte)
6.	(Mayotte) Feu du Centre (R4)	3–1	UCS Sada (R1) (Mayotte)
7.	(Mayotte) Miracle du Sud (R3)	0–2	Bandrélé FC (R1) (Mayotte)
8.	(Mayotte) Trévani SC (R4)	– (Note: US Bandéle penalised, Trévani SC qualify. Result unknown.)	US Bandréle (R3) (Mayotte)

Note: Mayotte League Structure (no promotion to French League Structure):
Régionale 1 (R1)
Régionale 2 (R2)
Régionale 3 (R3)
Régionale 4 (R4)

=== Quarter final (Mayotte) ===
These matches were played on 17 and 18 August 2024.

Quarter final results: Mayotte
Tie no	Home team (Tier)	Score	Away team (Tier)
1.	(Mayotte) AOE Chiconi (R4)	0–4	Diables Noirs (R1) (Mayotte)
2.	(Mayotte) Feu du Centre (R4)	1–0	USC Labattoir (R3) (Mayotte)
3.	(Mayotte) Bandrélé FC (R1)	1–1 (8–7 p)	AS Rosador (R1) (Mayotte)
4.	(Mayotte) AS Neige (R3)	2–0	Trévani SC (R4) (Mayotte)

Note: Mayotte League Structure (no promotion to French League Structure):
Régionale 1 (R1)
Régionale 2 (R2)
Régionale 3 (R3)
Régionale 4 (R4)

=== Semi final (Mayotte) ===
These matches were played on 14 September 2024.

Semi final results: Mayotte
Tie no	Home team (Tier)	Score	Away team (Tier)
1.	(Mayotte) AS Neige (R3)	0–1	Feu du Centre (R4) (Mayotte)
2.	(Mayotte) Diables Noirs (R1)	1–1 (8–7 p)	Bandrélé FC (R1) (Mayotte)

Note: Mayotte League Structure (no promotion to French League Structure):
Régionale 1 (R1)
Régionale 2 (R2)
Régionale 3 (R3)
Régionale 4 (R4)

=== Final (Mayotte) ===
This match was played on 12 October 2024.

Final results: Mayotte
Tie no	Home team (Tier)	Score	Away team (Tier)
1.	(Mayotte) Feu du Centre (R4)	1–4	Diables Noirs (R1) (Mayotte)

Note: Mayotte League Structure (no promotion to French League Structure):
Régionale 1 (R1)
Régionale 2 (R2)
Régionale 3 (R3)
Régionale 4 (R4)

== Réunion ==
In a change to last season, the Réunion league designated that the qualifying competition would be open to teams from the top three tiers, Régional 1, Régional 2 and Super 2. On 2 May 2024 the league published, via their official Facebook page, the draw for the opening round, referred to as the preliminary round, with 21 ties drawn, implying 11 byes to the next round and a total of 53 teams participating. The subsequent round, referred to as the third round to align with the rest of the qualifying competitions, was also published on the league's official Facebook page on 26 June 2024. The fourth round draw was published on 17 July 2024. The fifth round draw was published on 22 August 2024. The sixth round draw was conducted on local television and published on 8 October 2024 via the league's official Facebook page.

=== Preliminary round (Réunion) ===
These matches were played on 7 and 8 May 2024.

Preliminary round results: Réunion
Tie no	Home team (Tier)	Score	Away team (Tier)
1.	(Réunion) AF La Possession (S2)	1–2	AS Capricorne (R2) (Réunion)
2.	(Réunion) AJS Saint-Denis (S2)	1–0	AES La Convenance (S2) (Réunion)
3.	(Réunion) Entente Ravine Creuse (S2)	1–0	OC Avirons (R2) (Réunion)
4.	(Réunion) ASC La Possession (S2)	1–1 (7–6 p)	FC Ville de Saint-Philippe (R2) (Réunion)
5.	(Réunion) US Bellemene-Canot (R2)	4–0	JS Sainte-Annoise (S2) (Réunion)
6.	(Réunion) ASC Makes (S2)	2–1	OC Saint-André les Léopards (R2) (Réunion)
7.	(Réunion) AS du 12ème Km (S2)	1–3	Saint-Denis ÉFA (S2) (Réunion)
8.	(Réunion) SC Bois-de-Nèfles (S2)	0–2	ASC Grands Bois (R2) (Réunion)
9.	(Réunion) AS Évêché (S2)	0–2	AS Red Star 2019 (R2) (Réunion)
10.	(Réunion) US Sainte-Marienne (R2)	5–0	SS Rivière Sport (S2) (Réunion)
11.	(Réunion) FC du 17ème Km (S2)	1–1 (5–6 p)	AS Bretagne (R2) (Réunion)
12.	(Réunion) FC Parfin Saint-André (S2)	2–1	AJ Petite-Île (R2) (Réunion)
13.	(Réunion) Trois Bassins FC (R1)	6–2	AS La Redoute (S2) (Réunion)
14.	(Réunion) SC Chaudron (R2)	4–1	AS du Plate (S2) (Réunion)
15.	(Réunion) AS Marsouins (R2)	3–1	FC Moufia (S2) (Réunion)
16.	(Réunion) Vincendo Sport (S2)	0–3	CS Saint-Gilles (S2) (Réunion)
17.	(Réunion) FC Bagatelle Sainte-Suzanne (R2)	2–0	FC Plaine des Grègues (S2) (Réunion)
18.	(Réunion) ES Dominicaine (R2)	1–0	FC Rivière des Galets (S2) (Réunion)
19.	(Réunion) AS Étoile du Sud (S2)	0–2	AS Sainte-Suzanne (R1) (Réunion)
20.	(Réunion) JS Champ-Bornoise (S2)	3–1	AJS Bois d'Olives (S2) (Réunion)
21.	(Réunion) AFC Halte-Là (S2)	0–2	JS Gauloise (R1) (Réunion)

Note: Reúnion League Structure (no promotion to French League Structure):
Régional 1 (R1)
Régional 2 (R2)
Super 2 (S2)

=== Third round (Réunion) ===
These matches were played on 12, 13 and 14 July 2024.

Third round results: Réunion
Tie no	Home team (Tier)	Score	Away team (Tier)
1.	(Réunion) AF Saint-Louisien (R1)	1–1 (4–3 p)	AS Red Star 2019 (R2) (Réunion)
2.	(Réunion) JS Gauloise (R1)	4–0	JS Champ-Bornoise (S2) (Réunion)
3.	(Réunion) Saint-Pauloise FC (R1)	5–0	US Sainte-Marienne (R2) (Réunion)
4.	(Réunion) ACF Piton Saint-Leu (R1)	3–0	Entente Ravine Creuse (S2) (Réunion)
5.	(Réunion) FC Bagatelle Sainte-Suzanne (R2)	0–5	AS Excelsior (R1) (Réunion)
6.	(Réunion) SC Chaudron (R2)	1–3	AS Marsouins (R2) (Réunion)
7.	(Réunion) JS Saint-Pierroise (R1)	5–1	US Bellemene-Canot (R2) (Réunion)
8.	(Réunion) SS Jeanne d'Arc (R1)	1–1 (3–4 p)	AS Capricorne (R2) (Réunion)
9.	(Réunion) ES Dominicaine (R2)	2–0	ASC Grands Bois (R2) (Réunion)
10.	(Réunion) AJS Saint-Denis (S2)	0–2	Saint-Denis FC (R1) (Réunion)
11.	(Réunion) ASC La Possession (S2)	0–3	La Tamponnaise (R1) (Réunion)
12.	(Réunion) Ravine Blanche Club (R1)	1–0	Saint-Denis ÉFA (S2) (Réunion)
13.	(Réunion) AS Saint-Louisienne (R1)	0–1	AS Bretagne (R2) (Réunion)
14.	(Réunion) Sainte-Rose FC (R1)	4–0	CS Saint-Gilles (S2) (Réunion)
15.	(Réunion) FC Parfin Saint-André (S2)	0–2	AS Sainte-Suzanne (R1) (Réunion)
16.	(Réunion) Trois Bassins FC (R1)	3–0	ASC Makes (S2) (Réunion)

Note: Reúnion League Structure (no promotion to French League Structure):
Régional 1 (R1)
Régional 2 (R2)
Super 2 (S2)

=== Fourth round (Réunion) ===
These matches were played on 14 and 15 August 2024.

Fourth round results: Réunion
Tie no	Home team (Tier)	Score	Away team (Tier)
1.	(Réunion) JS Saint-Pierroise (R1)	0–0 (4–1 p)	AF Saint-Louisien (R1) (Réunion)
2.	(Réunion) Sainte-Rose FC (R1)	0–5	Saint-Pauloise FC (R1) (Réunion)
3.	(Réunion) AS Sainte-Suzanne (R1)	1–3	AS Marsouins (R2) (Réunion)
4.	(Réunion) Trois Bassins FC (R1)	0–3	La Tamponnaise (R1) (Réunion)
5.	(Réunion) Ravine Blanche Club (R1)	1–0	ACF Piton Saint-Leu (R1) (Réunion)
6.	(Réunion) AS Capricorne (R2)	3–3 (2–4 p)	Saint-Denis FC (R1) (Réunion)
7.	(Réunion) JS Gauloise (R1)	0–5	AS Excelsior (R1) (Réunion)
8.	(Réunion) ES Dominicaine (R2)	1–1 (3–4 p)	AS Bretagne (R2) (Réunion)

Note: Reúnion League Structure (no promotion to French League Structure):
Régional 1 (R1)
Régional 2 (R2)
Super 2 (S2)

=== Fifth round (Réunion) ===
These matches were played on 7 and 29 September 2024.

Fifth round results: Réunion
Tie no	Home team (Tier)	Score	Away team (Tier)
1.	(Réunion) AS Bretagne (R2)	2–4	Saint-Pauloise FC (R1) (Réunion)
2.	(Réunion) Ravine Blanche Club (R1)	0–4	Saint-Denis FC (R1) (Réunion)
3.	(Réunion) AS Marsouins (R2)	1–0	AS Excelsior (R1) (Réunion)
4.	(Réunion) JS Saint-Pierroise (R1)	2–0	La Tamponnaise (R1) (Réunion)

Note: Reúnion League Structure (no promotion to French League Structure):
Régional 1 (R1)
Régional 2 (R2)
Super 2 (S2)

=== Sixth round (Réunion) ===
These matches were played on 30 October 2024.

Sixth round results: Réunion
Tie no	Home team (Tier)	Score	Away team (Tier)
1.	(Réunion) Saint-Pauloise FC (R1)	0–0 (1–3 p)	Saint-Denis FC (R1) (Réunion)
2.	(Réunion) AS Marsouins (R2)	0–2	JS Saint-Pierroise (R1) (Réunion)

Note: Reúnion League Structure (no promotion to French League Structure):
Régional 1 (R1)
Régional 2 (R2)
Super 2 (S2)

== French Guiana ==
On 9 August 2024, the league published the list of the 37 teams registered for the qualifying competition, and the structure of the competition. A preliminary round, analogous to the second round in the mainland competition, would see ten teams enter. The remaining teams entered at the 3rd round stage.

=== Second round (French Guiana) ===
These matches were played on 24 August 2024, with one postponed until 1 September 2024.

Second Round Results: French Guiana
Tie no	Home team (Tier)	Score	Away team (Tier)
1.	(French Guiana) RC Maroni (R2)	6–1	AJ Balata Abriba (R2) (French Guiana)
2.	(French Guiana) EF Iracoubo (R2)	3–0 (Note: Tie won by means of forfeit.)	PAC Maroni (R3) (French Guiana)
3.	(French Guiana) ASC Rémire (R1)	3–2	ASU Grand Santi (R1) (French Guiana)
4.	(French Guiana) AJS Kourou (R2)	3–1	ASL Sport Guyanais (R2) (French Guiana)
5.	(French Guiana) SC Kouroucien (R1)	3–0	ASCS Maripasoula (none) (French Guiana)

Note: French Guiana League Structure (no promotion to French League Structure):
Régional 1 (R1)
Régional 2 (R2)
Régional 3 (R3)

=== Third round (French Guiana) ===
These matches were played on 31 August and 1, 7 and 8 September 2024.

Third Round Results: French Guiana
Tie no	Home team (Tier)	Score	Away team (Tier)
1.	(French Guiana) AJ Saint-Georges (R1)	3–0 (Note: Tie won by means of forfeit.)	Academy FC (R2) (French Guiana)
2.	(French Guiana) FC Charvein Mana (R2)	3–0	ASC Kawina (none) (French Guiana)
3.	(French Guiana) AS La Joyeuse Montjoly (R2)	2–1	US Saint-Élie (R3) (French Guiana)
4.	(French Guiana) Dynamo De Soula (R2)	2–2 (5–4 p)	US de Matoury (R1) (French Guiana)
5.	(French Guiana) Yana Sport Elite Academy (R3)	0–3	ASC Armire (R2) (French Guiana)
6.	(French Guiana) Cosma Foot (R2)	3–0	US Macouria (R2) (French Guiana)
7.	(French Guiana) Olympique Cayenne (R1)	1–2	ASC Rémire (R1) (French Guiana)
8.	(French Guiana) ASE Matoury (R1)	3–0	ASC Ouest (R2) (French Guiana)
9.	(French Guiana) ASC Karib (R1)	0–0 (9–8 p)	ASC Agouado (R1) (French Guiana)
10.	(French Guiana) AJS Kourou (R2)	1–1 (1–2 p)	Loyola OC (R1) (French Guiana)
11.	(French Guiana) CSC de Cayenne (R1)	4–1 (Note: ASCS Cogneau Lamirande penalised for fielding ineligible players, CSC de Cayenne qualify, despite also fielding a suspended player.)	ASCS Cogneau Lamirande (R3) (French Guiana)
12.	(French Guiana) SC Kouroucien (R1)	4–2 (Note: SC Kouroucien penalised for fielding a suspended player, US Sinnamary qualify.)	US Sinnamary (R1) (French Guiana)
13.	(French Guiana) RC Maroni (R2)	3–1	EF Iracoubo (R2) (French Guiana)
14.	(French Guiana) EJ Balaté (R2)	1–2	Aigles d'Or Mana (R2) (French Guiana)
15.	(French Guiana) USL Montjoly (none)	0–3	Kourou FC (R2) (French Guiana)
16.	(French Guiana) ASC Le Geldar (R1)	6–1	USC Montsinéry-Tonnegrande (R1) (French Guiana)

Note: French Guiana League Structure (no promotion to French League Structure):
Régional 1 (R1)
Régional 2 (R2)
Régional 3 (R3)

=== Fourth round (French Guiana) ===
These matches were played on 14, 21 and September and 5 October 2024.

Fourth Round Results: French Guiana
Tie no	Home team (Tier)	Score	Away team (Tier)
1.	(French Guiana) AJ Saint-Georges (R1)	1–2	FC Charvein Mana (R2) (French Guiana)
2.	(French Guiana) AS La Joyeuse Montjoly (R2)	2–1	Dynamo De Soula (R2) (French Guiana)
3.	(French Guiana) ASC Armire (R2)	1–3	Cosma Foot (R2) (French Guiana)
4.	(French Guiana) ASC Rémire (R1)	1–3	ASE Matoury (R1) (French Guiana)
5.	(French Guiana) Loyola OC (R1)	0–2	ASC Karib (R1) (French Guiana)
6.	(French Guiana) US Sinnamary (R1)	5–1	CSC de Cayenne (R1) (French Guiana)
7.	(French Guiana) Aigles d'Or Mana (R2)	3–2	RC Maroni (R2) (French Guiana)
8.	(French Guiana) Kourou FC (R2)	1–1 (3–4 p)	ASC Le Geldar (R1) (French Guiana)

Note: French Guiana League Structure (no promotion to French League Structure):
Régional 1 (R1)
Régional 2 (R2)
Régional 3 (R3)

=== Fifth round (French Guiana) ===
These matches were played on 26 October 2024.

Fifth Round Results: French Guiana
Tie no	Home team (Tier)	Score	Away team (Tier)
1.	(French Guiana) FC Charvein Mana (R2)	4–2	AS La Joyeuse Montjoly (R2) (French Guiana)
2.	(French Guiana) Cosma Foot (R2)	0–2	ASE Matoury (R1) (French Guiana)
3.	(French Guiana) ASC Karib (R1)	0–1	US Sinnamary (R1) (French Guiana)
4.	(French Guiana) ASC Le Geldar (R1)	3–4	Aigles d'Or Mana (R2) (French Guiana)

Note: French Guiana League Structure (no promotion to French League Structure):
Régional 1 (R1)
Régional 2 (R2)
Régional 3 (R3)

=== Sixth round (French Guiana) ===
These matches were played on 2 and 3 November 2024.

Sixth Round Results: French Guiana
Tie no	Home team (Tier)	Score	Away team (Tier)
1.	(French Guiana) ASE Matoury (R1)	3–0	FC Charvein Mana (R2) (French Guiana)
2.	(French Guiana) US Sinnamary (R1)	1–2	Aigles d'Or Mana (R2) (French Guiana)

Note: French Guiana League Structure (no promotion to French League Structure):
Régional 1 (R1)
Régional 2 (R2)
Régional 3 (R3)

== Martinique ==
The draw for the first preliminary round, referred to as the second round to align with the rest of the competition, in the region was made on 15 July 2024 and published by the league on 22 July 2024. There were 23 ties drawn with 9 teams given byes to the third round. The draw for the third round was published on 28 August 2024. The fourth round draw was published in local media on 17 September 2024. The fifth round draw was published on the league's Facebook page on 19 September 2024. The sixth round draw was published on 3 October 2024.

=== Second round (Martinique) ===
These matches were played on 24, 25 and 27 August 2024.

Second Round Results: Martinique
Tie no	Home team (Tier)	Score	Away team (Tier)
1.	(Martinique) ASC Emulation (R1)	12–1	AS Silver Star (R3) (Martinique)
2.	(Martinique) AS Morne-des-Esses (R2)	0–0 (4–2 p)	CS Case-Pilote (R1) (Martinique)
3.	(Martinique) UJ Redoute (R3)	0–3 (Note: Tie won by means of forfeit.)	CO Trénelle (R1) (Martinique)
4.	(Martinique) Éveil Les Trois Islets (R2)	3–2	SC Lamentin (R3) (Martinique)
5.	(Martinique) US Robert (R2)	0–2	Inter de Sainte-Anne (R2) (Martinique)
6.	(Martinique) Good Luck de Fort-de-France (R2)	0–2	Assaut de Saint-Pierre (R2) (Martinique)
7.	(Martinique) Essor-Préchotain (R2)	7–0	L'Intrépide Club (R3) (Martinique)
8.	(Martinique) JS Eucalyptus (R3)	1–1 (7–8 p)	US Marinoise (R2) (Martinique)
9.	(Martinique) ASC Hirondelle (R3)	0–3	Océanic Club Le Lorrain (R2) (Martinique)
10.	(Martinique) AS Excelsior (R3)	1–4	ASC Môn Pito (R2) (Martinique)
11.	(Martinique) CS Bélimois (R3)	1–1 (5–4 p) (Note: CS Bélimois penalised for fielding a suspended player, Gri-Gri Pilotin FC qualify.)	Gri-Gri Pilotin FC (R3) (Martinique)
12.	(Martinique) RC Bô Kannal (R3)	0–19	US Diamantinoise (R1) (Martinique)
13.	(Martinique) RC Lorrain (R3)	0–6	Club Péléen (R1) (Martinique)
14.	(Martinique) Réal Tartane (R2)	1–3	AS New Club (R1) (Martinique)
15.	(Martinique) FEP Monésie (R3)	1–3 (Note: Stade Spiritain penalised for fielding ineligible players, FEP Monésie qualify.)	Stade Spiritain (R1) (Martinique)
16.	(Martinique) UJ Monnérot (R3)	2–2 (5–3 p)	New Star Ducos (R3) (Martinique)
17.	(Martinique) RC Rivière-Pilote (R2)	2–0	Réveil Sportif (R2) (Martinique)
18.	(Martinique) AS Éclair Rivière-Salée (R2)	3–0	Solidarité de Lestrade (R3) (Martinique)
19.	(Martinique) JS Marigot (R3)	1–4	AC Vert-Pré (R2) (Martinique)
20.	Futsal Académie Martinique (R2)	8–0	La Gauloise de Trinité (R3) (Martinique)
21.	(Martinique) CS Vauclinois (R2)	1–2	US Riveraine (R2) (Martinique)
22.	(Martinique) ASC Eudorçait-Fourniols (R2)	0–0 (3–4 p)	AS Étoile Basse-Pointe (R3) (Martinique)
23.	(Martinique) Étendard Bellefontaine (R2)	1–2	Olympique Le Marin (R2) (Martinique)

Note: Martinique League Structure (no promotion to French League Structure):
Régionale 1 (R1)
Régionale 2 (R2)
Régionale 3 (R3)

=== Third round (Martinique) ===
These matches were played on 30 and 31 August and 1 September 2024.

Third Round Results: Martinique
Tie no	Home team (Tier)	Score	Away team (Tier)
1.	(Martinique) RC Saint-Joseph (R1)	4–3	AS Morne-des-Esses (R2) (Martinique)
2.	(Martinique) Club Franciscain (R1)	8–1	ASC Effort (R2) (Martinique)
3.	(Martinique) CO Trénelle (R1)	9–1	Éveil Les Trois Islets (R2) (Martinique)
4.	(Martinique) ASC Môn Pito (R2)	1–5	Aiglon du Lamentin FC (R1) (Martinique)
5.	(Martinique) US Marinoise (R2)	1–2	ASC Emulation (R1) (Martinique)
6.	(Martinique) Assaut de Saint-Pierre (R2)	1–3	Golden Lion FC (R1) (Martinique)
7.	(Martinique) Océanic Club Le Lorrain (R2)	2–0	Inter de Sainte-Anne (R2) (Martinique)
8.	(Martinique) Gri-Gri Pilotin FC (R3)	0–2	Essor-Préchotain (R2) (Martinique)
9.	(Martinique) AS New Club (R1)	1–2	AS Samaritaine (R1) (Martinique)
10.	(Martinique) FEP Monésie (R3)	0–8	Golden Star de Fort-de-France (R1) (Martinique)
11.	(Martinique) US Diamantinoise (R1)	1–1 (8–7 p)	RC Rivière-Pilote (R2) (Martinique)
12.	(Martinique) AS Étoile Basse-Pointe (R3)	2–1	Club Colonial (R1) (Martinique)
13.	(Martinique) UJ Monnérot (R3)	0–6	Club Péléen (R1) (Martinique)
14.	(Martinique) AC Vert-Pré (R2)	1–6	Espoir Sainte-Luce (R1) (Martinique)
15.	(Martinique) Olympique Le Marin (R2)	2–2 (3–5 p)	Futsal Académie Martinique (R2)
16.	(Martinique) US Riveraine (R2)	1–0	AS Éclair Rivière-Salée (R2) (Martinique)

Note: Martinique League Structure (no promotion to French League Structure):
Régionale 1 (R1)
Régionale 2 (R2)
Régionale 3 (R3)

=== Fourth round (Martinique) ===
These matches were played on 17 and 18 September 2024.

Fourth Round Results: Martinique
Tie no	Home team (Tier)	Score	Away team (Tier)
1.	(Martinique) Espoir Sainte-Luce (R1)	2–1	US Riveraine (R2) (Martinique)
2.	Futsal Académie Martinique (R2)	1–6	US Diamantinoise (R1) (Martinique)
3.	(Martinique) AS Samaritaine (R1)	3–0	Club Péléen (R1) (Martinique)
4.	(Martinique) Aiglon du Lamentin FC (R1)	0–4	RC Saint-Joseph (R1) (Martinique)
5.	(Martinique) AS Étoile Basse-Pointe (R3)	2–2 (5–3 p)	Golden Star de Fort-de-France (R1) (Martinique)
6.	(Martinique) Golden Lion FC (R1)	2–0	Club Franciscain (R1) (Martinique)
7.	(Martinique) Essor-Préchotain (R2)	4–6	CO Trénelle (R1) (Martinique)
8.	(Martinique) ASC Emulation (R1)	3–1	Océanic Club Le Lorrain (R2) (Martinique)

Note: Martinique League Structure (no promotion to French League Structure):
Régionale 1 (R1)
Régionale 2 (R2)
Régionale 3 (R3)

=== Fifth round (Martinique) ===
These matches were played on 2 October 2024.

Fifth Round Results: Martinique
Tie no	Home team (Tier)	Score	Away team (Tier)
1.	(Martinique) RC Saint-Joseph (R1)	2–0	ASC Emulation (R1) (Martinique)
2.	(Martinique) CO Trénelle (R1)	0–4	Golden Lion FC (R1) (Martinique)
3.	(Martinique) US Diamantinoise (R1)	2–3	Espoir Sainte-Luce (R1) (Martinique)
4.	(Martinique) AS Étoile Basse-Pointe (R3)	0–6	AS Samaritaine (R1) (Martinique)

Note: Martinique League Structure (no promotion to French League Structure):
Régionale 1 (R1)
Régionale 2 (R2)
Régionale 3 (R3)

=== Sixth round (Martinique) ===
These matches were played on 26 October 2024.

Sixth Round Results: Martinique
Tie no	Home team (Tier)	Score	Away team (Tier)
1.	(Martinique) Golden Lion FC (R1)	1–2	RC Saint-Joseph (R1) (Martinique)
2.	(Martinique) AS Samaritaine (R1)	1–0	Espoir Sainte-Luce (R1) (Martinique)

Note: Martinique League Structure (no promotion to French League Structure):
Régionale 1 (R1)
Régionale 2 (R2)
Régionale 3 (R3)

== Guadeloupe ==
The draw for the opening round of the competition, named as the second round to align with the main competition, was made on 30 July 2024, and published on the leagues website on 23 August 2024. The third round draw, which saw the entry of the team from the Collectivity of Saint Martin, was published on the leagues Facebook page on 13 September 2024. The fourth round draw was also published on the leagues Facebook page on 27 September 2024. Similarly, the fifth round draw was published on 16 October 2024. The sixth and final round draw was published on 25 October 2024.

=== Second round (Guadeloupe) ===
These matches were played on various dates between 24 August 2024 and 1 September 2024.

Second Round Results: Guadeloupe
Tie no	Home team (Tier)	Score	Away team (Tier)
1.	(Guadeloupe) AS Dragon (R3)	7–2	JS Abymienne (R3) (Guadeloupe)
2.	(Guadeloupe) Red Star (R2)	2–1	Granite FC (R3) (Guadeloupe)
3.	(Guadeloupe) Jeuness Trois-Rivières (R3)	2–2 (9–10 p)	ASC Madiana (R3) (Guadeloupe)
4.	(Guadeloupe) ASC Équinoxe (R2)	0–0 (3–4 p)	Union des Artistes de Raizet (R2) (Guadeloupe)
5.	(Guadeloupe) JS Vieux-Habitants (R2)	3–1	AJ Castel (R3) (Guadeloupe)
6.	(Guadeloupe) AS Nénuphars (R3)	2–1	USC de Bananier (R3) (Guadeloupe)
7.	(Guadeloupe) ASG Juventus de Sainte-Anne (R2)	4–0	AS Juventa (R3) (Guadeloupe)
8.	(Guadeloupe) Étoile Filante (R2)	2–1	US Ansoise (R2) (Guadeloupe)
9.	(Guadeloupe) OC Morne-à-l'Eau (R3)	0–6	Résistance Bouillante (R2) (Guadeloupe)
10.	(Guadeloupe) CA Marquisat (R2)	9–0	Mondial Club (R3) (Guadeloupe)
11.	(Guadeloupe) AJ Saint-Félix (R3)	2–1	ASC La Frégate (R2) (Guadeloupe)
12.	(Guadeloupe) JSC Marie Galante (R2)	0–1	Racing Club de Basse-Terre (R2) (Guadeloupe)
13.	(Guadeloupe) AC Saint-Robert (R2)	3–0 (Note: Tie won by means of forfeit.)	Zénith Morne-à-l'Eau (R3) (Guadeloupe)
14.	(Guadeloupe) Cygne Noir (R2)	0–3	Solidarité-Scolaire (R2) (Guadeloupe)
15.	(Guadeloupe) Stade Lamentinois (R2)	8–1	Alliance FC (R3) (Guadeloupe)
16.	(Guadeloupe) Association Juvenis (R3)	0–4	Arsenal Club (R2) (Guadeloupe)
17.	(Guadeloupe) Rapid Club Petit-Canal (R3)	0–4	CS Bouillantais (R2) (Guadeloupe)
18.	(Guadeloupe) Amical Club Marie Galante (R2)	3–0	L'Éclair de Petit-Bourg (R3) (Guadeloupe)
19.	(Guadeloupe) Colonial Club Baillif (none)	0–3	CS Capesterre-Belle-Eau (R2) (Guadeloupe)

Note: Guadeloupe League Structure (no promotion to French League Structure):
Ligue Régionale 1 (R1)
Ligue Régionale 2 (R2)
Ligue Régionale 3 (R3)

=== Third round (Guadeloupe) ===
These matches were played on 13, 14 and 18 September 2024.

Third Round Results: Guadeloupe
Tie no	Home team (Tier)	Score	Away team (Tier)
1.	(Guadeloupe) ASC Madiana (R3)	2–0	AS Nénuphars (R3) (Guadeloupe)
2.	(Guadeloupe) US Baie-Mahault (R1)	4–1	Stade Lamentinois (R2) (Guadeloupe)
3.	(Guadeloupe) CS Moulien (R1)	1–1 (3–1 p)	Union des Artistes de Raizet (R2) (Guadeloupe)
4.	(Guadeloupe) La Gauloise de Basse-Terre (R1)	5–1	ASC Carénage (R2) (Guadeloupe)
5.	(Guadeloupe) Red Star (R2)	0–0 (3–4 p)	Arsenal Club (R2) (Guadeloupe)
6.	(Guadeloupe) AC Saint-Robert (R2)	2–0	AS Dragon (R3) (Guadeloupe)
7.	(Guadeloupe) ASG Juventus de Sainte-Anne (R2)	0–2	SC Baie-Mahault (R1) (Guadeloupe)
8.	(Guadeloupe) Racing Club de Basse-Terre (R2)	2–1	L'Etoile de Morne-à-l'Eau (R1) (Guadeloupe)
9.	(Guadeloupe) Étoile Filante (R2)	1–1 (5–4 p)	Résistance Bouillante (R2) (Guadeloupe)
10.	(Guadeloupe) AS Le Moule (R1)	2–3	CA Marquisat (R2) (Guadeloupe)
11.	(Guadeloupe) AJ Saint-Félix (R3)	1–0	Amical Club Marie Galante (R2) (Guadeloupe)
12.	(Guadeloupe) Dynamo Le Moule (R1)	4–0	JS Vieux-Habitants (R2) (Guadeloupe)
13.	(Guadeloupe) ASC Siroco Les Abymes (R1)	2–0	CS Capesterre-Belle-Eau (R2) (Guadeloupe)
14.	(Guadeloupe) CS Bouillantais (R2)	0–0 (2–3 p)	AO Gourbeyrienne (R1) (Guadeloupe)
15.	(Guadeloupe) AS Gosier (R1)	4–0 (Note: Junior Stars FC qualified for this round via an internal Collectivity of Saint-Martin qualfiying match against ASC St. Louis Stars on 31 August 2024, which they won 5–0. The result of this third round game is not listed on FFF listings, but is reported externally.)	Junior Stars FC (R1 Saint-Martin) (Collectivity of Saint Martin)
16.	(Guadeloupe) Jeunesse Evolution (R1)	6–1	Solidarité-Scolaire (R2) (Guadeloupe)

Note: Guadeloupe League Structure (no promotion to French League Structure):
Ligue Régionale 1 (R1)
Ligue Régionale 2 (R2)
Ligue Régionale 3 (R3)

=== Fourth round (Guadeloupe) ===
These matches were played on 27, 28 and 29 September 2024.

Fourth Round Results: Guadeloupe
Tie no	Home team (Tier)	Score	Away team (Tier)
1.	(Guadeloupe) Étoile Filante (R2)	1–3	US Baie-Mahault (R1) (Guadeloupe)
2.	(Guadeloupe) AC Saint-Robert (R2)	1–1 (2–3 p)	Jeunesse Evolution (R1) (Guadeloupe)
3.	(Guadeloupe) La Gauloise de Basse-Terre (R1)	3–1	AS Gosier (R1) (Guadeloupe)
4.	(Guadeloupe) CA Marquisat (R2)	2–7	CS Moulien (R1) (Guadeloupe)
5.	(Guadeloupe) Dynamo Le Moule (R1)	0–2	ASC Siroco Les Abymes (R1) (Guadeloupe)
6.	(Guadeloupe) AJ Saint-Félix (R3)	2–3	AO Gourbeyrienne (R1) (Guadeloupe)
7.	(Guadeloupe) ASC Madiana (R3)	0–5	Arsenal Club (R2) (Guadeloupe)
8.	(Guadeloupe) SC Baie-Mahault (R1)	7–1	Racing Club de Basse-Terre (R2) (Guadeloupe)

Note: Guadeloupe League Structure (no promotion to French League Structure):
Ligue Régionale 1 (R1)
Ligue Régionale 2 (R2)
Ligue Régionale 3 (R3)

=== Fifth round (Guadeloupe) ===
These matches were played on 16, 19 and 20 October 2024.

Fifth Round Results: Guadeloupe
Tie no	Home team (Tier)	Score	Away team (Tier)
1.	(Guadeloupe) US Baie-Mahault (R1)	4–0	AO Gourbeyrienne (R1) (Guadeloupe)
2.	(Guadeloupe) CS Moulien (R1)	1–1 (4–3 p)	SC Baie-Mahault (R1) (Guadeloupe)
3.	(Guadeloupe) ASC Siroco Les Abymes (R1)	4–1	La Gauloise de Basse-Terre (R1) (Guadeloupe)
4.	(Guadeloupe) Arsenal Club (R2)	0–2	Jeunesse Evolution (R1) (Guadeloupe)

Note: Guadeloupe League Structure (no promotion to French League Structure):
Ligue Régionale 1 (R1)
Ligue Régionale 2 (R2)
Ligue Régionale 3 (R3)

=== Sixth round (Guadeloupe) ===
These matches were played on 26 October 2024.

Sixth Round Results: Guadeloupe
Tie no	Home team (Tier)	Score	Away team (Tier)
1.	(Guadeloupe) Jeunesse Evolution (R1)	1–1 (3–2 p)	ASC Siroco Les Abymes (R1) (Guadeloupe)
2.	(Guadeloupe) CS Moulien (R1)	2–1	US Baie-Mahault (R1) (Guadeloupe)

Note: Guadeloupe League Structure (no promotion to French League Structure):
Ligue Régionale 1 (R1)
Ligue Régionale 2 (R2)
Ligue Régionale 3 (R3)
