= List of football clubs in Martinique =

Association football clubs in Martinique are listed below.

== List ==
- Aiglon du Lamentin (Le Lamentin)
- Anses d'Arlet
- Case-Pilote
- Colonial (Fort-de-France)
- Diamantinoise (Le Diamant)
- Emulation (Schœlcher)
- Essor-Préchotain (Le Prêcheur)
- Etoile (Basse-Pointe) (newly promoted)
- Franciscain (Le François)
- La Gauloise de Trinité
- Golden Lion
- Golden Star (Fort-de-France)
- New Club (Petit-Bourg)
- Rapid Club Lorrain (newly promoted)
- Réveil-Sportif (Gros-Morne)
- Rivière-Pilote
- Robert
- Saint-Joseph
- Samaritaine (Ste.-Marie) (newly promoted)
- Stade Spiritain
- Vert-Pré
