= 2020–21 Martinique Championnat National =

Martinique Championnat National
- Season: 2020–21
- Dates: 4 September 2020 – 16 March 2021

The 2020–21 Martinique Championnat National was the 101st season of the Martinique Championnat National, the top division football competition in Martinique. The season began on 4 September 2020 and ended on 16 March 2021.

The season was split into two regional groups due to the COVID-19 pandemic in Martinique. The top three teams in each group are to play in a Championship Round, and the bottom five teams in each group are to play in the relegation round, but no matches have been reported of as of July 2021.

== Clubs ==
- Aiglon
- Assaut
- Colonial
- Essor-Préchotain
- Franciscain
- Golden Lion
- Golden Star
- Lorrian
- Monnerot
- New Star
- Olympique
- Rivière-Pilote
- Robert
- Saint-Joseph
- Samaritaine
- Trénelle

== Regular season ==
=== Group A ===
==== Table ====
Note: 4 points for a win, 2 points for a draw, 1 point for a defeat.

Pos	Team	Pld	W	D	L	GF	GA	GD	Pts	Qualification or relegation
1	Golden Lion	14	13	0	1	42	11	+31	53	Championship Round
2	Samaritaine	14	9	3	2	28	8	+20	44	Championship Round
3	Saint-Joseph	14	5	6	3	19	18	+1	35	Championship Round
4	Assaut	14	6	1	7	18	22	−4	33	Relegation Round
5	Robert	14	5	2	7	17	26	−9	31	Relegation Round
6	Trénelle	14	3	3	8	22	22	0	26	Relegation Round
7	Monnerot	14	2	5	7	18	39	−21	25	Relegation Round
8	Golden Star	14	1	4	9	16	34	−18	21	Relegation Round

Source: Soccerway

==== Results ====
Home \ Away	ASS	GLI	GST	MON	ROB	SJO	SAM	TRE
Assaut		1–6	1–3	2–1	1–0	0–1	0–1	2–0
Golden Lion	2–1		3–1	4–0	3–1	2–0	1–0	1–0
Golden Star	3–5	2–3		1–1	1–2	1–3	0–3	1–6
Monnerot	2–1	1–7	2–2		1–4	2–2	1–3	1–1
Robert	2–0	0–4	1–0	1–2		0–0	0–4	2–2
Saint-Joseph	0–2	1–0	0–0	3–3	3–2		2–2	2–2
Samaritaine	1–1	1–2	0–0	4–0	4–0	2–1		2–0
Trénelle	0–1	2–4	4–1	4–1	1–2	0–1	0–1	

Source: Soccerway.com

=== Group B ===
==== Table ====
Note: 4 points for a win, 2 points for a draw, 1 point for a defeat.

Pos	Team	Pld	W	D	L	GF	GA	GD	Pts	Qualification or relegation
1	Franciscain	14	12	0	2	42	10	+32	50	Championship Round
2	Colonial	14	11	1	2	33	13	+20	48	Championship Round
3	Essor-Préchotain	14	9	1	4	25	22	+3	42	Championship Round
4	Aiglon	14	8	2	4	26	12	+14	40	Relegation Round
5	Lorrian	14	3	3	8	16	28	−12	26	Relegation Round
6	Rivière-Pilote	14	2	4	8	7	21	−14	24	Relegation Round
7	New Star	14	2	2	10	13	33	−20	22	Relegation Round
8	Olympique	14	1	3	10	7	30	−23	20	Relegation Round

Source: Soccerway

==== Results ====
Home \ Away	AIG	COL	ESS	FRA	LOR	NEW	OLY	RVP
Aiglon		3–1	4–1	0–1	2–0	1–0	6–0	0–0
Colonial	1–0		3–0	2–1	2–0	4–1	0–0	4–1
Essor-Préchotain	2–1	3–4		2–1	3–2	2–1	1–0	1–0
Franciscain	4–0	3–1	2–1		3–1	9–0	5–1	2–0
Lorrian	0–5	1–3	1–1	1–3		1–1	3–1	2–0
New Star	1–2	0–2	1–4	1–2	4–1		1–0	1–1
Olympique	1–1	0–3	1–2	0–2	0–3	2–1		1–2
Rivière-Pilote	0–1	0–3	1–2	0–4	0–0	2–0	0–0	

Source: Soccerway.com

== Championship round ==
=== Table ===
Note: 4 points for a win, 2 points for a draw, 1 point for a defeat.

Pos	Team	Pld	W	D	L	GF	GA	GD	Pts	Qualification
1	Golden Lion (C)	3	3	0	0	9	1	+8	12	Caribbean Club Shield
2	Samaritaine	3	2	1	0	8	5	+3	10	
3	Franciscain	3	1	1	1	5	5	0	7	
4	Colonial	3	1	0	2	3	4	−1	6	
5	Essor-Préchotain	3	0	1	2	3	9	−6	4	
6	Saint-Joseph	3	0	1	2	1	5	−4	4	

Source: Soccerway.com
(C) Champions

=== Results ===
Home \ Away	COL	ESS	FRA	GLI	SJO	SAM
Colonial					2–0	
Essor-Préchotain					1–1	
Franciscain					2–0	3–3
Golden Lion	2–1	5–0	2–0			
Saint-Joseph						
Samaritaine	2–0	3–2				

Source: Soccerway.com
