= 2015–16 Martinique Championnat National =

Statistics from the 2015–16 season.

== Table ==
Pos	Team	Pld	W	D	L	GF	GA	GD	Pts	Qualification or relegation
1	Golden Lion (C, Q)	25	18	5	2	56	18	+38	84	2017 CFU Club Championship & 2016–17 Coupe de France
2	Club Franciscain	25	14	6	5	50	18	+32	73	2017 CFU Club Championship & 2016–17 Coupe de France
3	Club Colonial	25	13	8	4	46	19	+27	72	
4	Case-Pilote	25	14	3	8	38	27	+11	70	
5	Rivière-Pilote	25	10	8	7	43	32	+11	63	
6	Golden Star	25	10	8	7	28	31	−3	63	
7	Essor-Préchotain	25	10	7	8	32	25	+7	62	
8	Good Luck	25	9	8	8	29	31	−2	60	
9	Aiglon	25	7	9	9	23	33	−10	55	
10	Excelsior	25	9	3	13	28	52	−24	55	
11	Samaritaine	25	8	4	13	31	36	−5	53	
12	New Star	25	5	12	8	28	35	−7	52	Qualification to relegation playoffs
13	Emulation (Q)	25	4	5	16	20	46	−26	42	Qualification to relegation playoffs
14	Marinoise (R)	25	0	2	23	9	58	−49	27	Relegation to the Martinique Promotion d'Honneur

Updated to match(es) played on 7 May 2016.
Source: https://www.rsssf.org/tablesf/frant2016.html
(C) Champions;
(Q) Qualified for the phase indicated;
(R) Relegated
