= 2016–17 Martinique Championnat National =

Championnat National
- Season: 2016–17
- Relegated: Diamantinoise; New Club; Excelsior
- 2018 Caribbean Club Championship: Club Franciscain; Golden Lion
- Matches played: 182
- Goals scored: 335 (1.84 per match)
- Biggest home win: Club Franciscain 8–0 Marinoise (11 Nov 2016)
- Biggest away win: Excelsior 0–7 Golden Lion (19 Sep 2016)
- Highest scoring: Club Franciscain 8–0 Marinoise (11 Nov 2016)
- All statistics correct as of 26 April 2017.

The 2016–17 Martinique Championnat National was the 97th season of the Championnat National, top division of football in Martinique. The season began on 9 September 2016 and will end on 13 May 2017.

== Clubs ==
Fourteen clubs participated in the Championnat National during the 2016-17 campaign. New Club, Eucalyptus and Diamantinoise were promoted from the second division.

Team	Home city	Home ground
Aiglon	Lamentin	Stade Omnisports
Case-Pilote	Case-Pilote	Stade Omer-Kromwell
Club Colonial	Fort-de-France	Stade Pierre-Aliker
Diamantinoise	Diamant	Stade Dizac
Essor-Préchotain	Prêcheur	Stade Albert Joyau
Eucalyptus	François	Stade Trianon
Excelsior	Fort-de-France	Stade Pierre-Aliker
Club Franciscain	François	Stade Municipal François
Golden Lion	Saint-Joseph	Stade Henri Murano
Golden Star	Fort-de-France	Stade Serge Rouch
Good Luck	Fort-de-France	Stade Pierre-Aliker
New Club	Rivière-Salée	Stade Herman Panzo
New Star	Ducos	Stade Municipal Max Soron
Rivière-Pilote	Rivière-Pilote	Stade Alfred Marie-Jeanne

== Table ==
The point system is four points for a win, two for a draw and one for a loss.

Pos	Team	Pld	W	D	L	GF	GA	GD	Pts	Qualification or relegation
1	Club Franciscain (Q)	25	20	4	1	72	11	+61	89	2018 Caribbean Club Championship & 2017–18 Coupe de France
2	Golden Lion (Q)	25	19	5	1	81	13	+68	87	2018 Caribbean Club Championship & 2017–18 Coupe de France
3	Rivière-Pilote	25	14	7	4	51	21	+30	74	
4	Club Colonial	25	15	3	7	38	22	+16	73	
5	Aiglon	25	13	5	7	59	46	+13	69	
6	Essor-Préchotain	25	11	8	6	35	29	+6	66	
7	Case-Pilote	25	8	8	9	33	41	−8	57	
8	Good Luck	25	8	7	10	29	35	−6	56	
9	New Star	25	9	3	13	33	40	−7	55	
10	Golden Star	25	6	4	15	33	47	−14	47	
11	Eucalyptus	25	5	6	14	22	47	−25	46	
12	Diamantinoise (R)	25	3	8	14	27	62	−35	42	2017–18 Martinique Promotion d'Honneur
13	New Club (Note: New Club were deducted one point.) (R)	25	3	6	16	20	55	−35	39	2017–18 Martinique Promotion d'Honneur
14	Excelsior (R)	25	3	2	20	20	84	−64	36	2017–18 Martinique Promotion d'Honneur

Updated to match(es) played on 6 May 2017.
Source: https://www.rsssf.org/tablesf/frant2017.html
(Q) Qualified for the phase indicated;
(R) Relegated
