= Gérald Dondon =

French association football player (born 1986)

Personal information
- Full name: Gérald Dondon
- Date of birth: October 4, 1986 (age 40)
- Place of birth: Fort-de-France, Martinique
- Height: 1.75 m (5 ft 9 in)
- Position: Defender

Team information
- Current team: Club Colonial

Youth career
- –2005: Olympique du Marin

Senior career*
Years	Team	Apps	(Gls)
–2010	Golden Star		
2010–2011	CS Case-Pilote		
2011–2013–	Golden Star		
2013–2014	RC Rivière-Pilote		
2014–	Club Colonial		

International career
2008–	Martinique	16	(2)
- * Club domestic league appearances and goals

Gérald Dondon (born 4 October 1986) is a professional footballer who plays as a defender for Club Colonial and internationally for Martinique.

He made his debut for Martinique in 2008. He was in the Martinique Gold Cup squad for the 2017 tournament.
