= Jean-Claude Michalet =

Martiniquais footballer (born 2000)

Personal information
- Full name: Jean-Claude Junior Michalet
- Date of birth: 8 April 2000 (age 26)
- Place of birth: Le Lamentin, Martinique, France
- Height: 1.80 m (5 ft 11 in)
- Position: Centre-back

Team information
- Current team: Bassin d'Arcachon

Senior career*
Years	Team	Apps	(Gls)
2017–2019	New Star de Ducos		
2020–2023	Golden Lion		
2023–	Bassin d'Arcachon	29+ (Note: Statistics not available for the 2023–24 season.)	(0+)

International career^{‡}
2018	Martinique U20	4	(0)
2021–2024	Martinique	9	(2)
- * Club domestic league appearances and goals ‡ National team caps and goals as of 24 March 2024

Jean-Claude Junior Michalet (born 8 April 2000) is a Martiniquais professional footballer who plays as a centre-back for Championnat National 3 club Bassin d'Arcachon. He played for the Martinique national team.

== Club career ==
Michalet joined Golden Lion in 2020, winning the Martinique Championnat National in his debut season. After becoming an undisputed starter by 2022, he went on trial at French third-tier club Orléans.

== International career ==
Michalet made his Martinique debut in a 2–1 friendly defeat to Guadeloupe on 23 June 2021. On 2 June 2023, he was selected by head coach Marc Collat for the 2023 CONCACAF Gold Cup. He made his debut in the competition in a 2–1 win over El Salvador.

== Honours ==
Golden Lion

- Martinique Championnat National: 2020–21, 2021–22, 2022–23
- Coupe de la Martinique: 2022–23
