= Patrick Percin =

Martiniquais footballer (born 1976)

Personal information
- Full name: Patrick Gilles Percin
- Date of birth: 18 December 1976 (age 49)
- Place of birth: La Trinité, Martinique
- Height: 1.78 m (5 ft 10 in)
- Position: Forward

Youth career
- 1981–1991: Gauloise de Trinité
- 1991: Auxerre
- 1991–1992: Gauloise de Trinité

Senior career*
Years	Team	Apps	(Gls)
1992–2003	Club Franciscain		
2003–2004	Amiens	16	(0)
2004–2006	Club Franciscain		
2006–2010	Samaritaine		
2010–2013	Bélimois		
2013–2014	Robert		
2014–2019	Club Franciscain		

International career
1998–2010	Martinique	58	(19)

Managerial career
- 2019–2020: Club Franciscain
- * Club domestic league appearances and goals

Patrick Gilles Percin (born 18 December 1976) is a Martiniquais former professional footballer who played as a forward.

== Career statistics ==
=== Club ===
Appearances and goals by club, season and competition
Club	Season	League			National Cup		League Cup		Other		Total	
Club	Season	Division	Apps	Goals	Apps	Goals	Apps	Goals	Apps	Goals	Apps	Goals
Amiens	2003–04	Ligue 2	16	0	0	0	1 (Note: Appearances in the Coupe de la Ligue)	0	0	0	17	0
Club Franciscain	2014–15	Martinique Championnat National	–		1 (Note: Appearances in the Coupe de France)	0	–		0	0	1	0
Club Franciscain	2018–19	Martinique Championnat National	–		0	0	–		1 (Note: Appearances in the CONCACAF Champions League)	0	1	0
Career total			16	0	1	0	1	0	1	0	19	0

=== International ===
Appearances and goals by national team and year
National team	Year	Apps	Goals
Martinique	1998	2	0
Martinique	2001	6	2
Martinique	2002	8	5
Martinique	2003	8	2
Martinique	2004	5	1
Martinique	2006	6	0
Martinique	2007	4	1
Martinique	2008	8	4
Martinique	2009	1	0
Martinique	2010	10	4
Total		58	19

Scores and results list Martinique's goal tally first.

No	Date	Venue	Opponent	Score	Result	Competition
1.	4 April 2001	Stade Pierre-Aliker, Fort-de-France, Martinique	Saint Vincent and the Grenadines	1–0	3–0	2002 CONCACAF Gold Cup qualification
2.	19 May 2001	Hasely Crawford Stadium, Port of Spain, Trinidad and Tobago	Trinidad and Tobago	2–1	2–1	2002 CONCACAF Gold Cup qualification
3.	6 January 2002	Stade Pierre-Aliker, Fort-de-France, Martinique	Haiti	?–?	3–3	Friendly
4.	21 January 2002	Orange Bowl, Miami, Florida, United States	Trinidad and Tobago	1–0	1–0	2002 CONCACAF Gold Cup
5.	9 October 2002	Unknown	Saint Lucia	?–?	4–0	Friendly
6.	1 December 2002	Truman Bodden Stadium, George Town, Cayman Islands	Cayman Islands	2–0	3–0	2003 CONCACAF Gold Cup qualification
7.	1 December 2002	Truman Bodden Stadium, George Town, Cayman Islands	Cayman Islands	3–0	3–0	2003 CONCACAF Gold Cup qualification
8.	14 March 2003	Stade Pierre-Aliker, Fort-de-France, Martinique	French Guiana	?–?	2–1	Friendly
9.	26 March 2003	Independence Park, Kingston, Jamaica	Haiti	1–0	1–2	2003 CONCACAF Gold Cup qualification
10.	10 November 2004	Stade Pierre-Aliker, Fort-de-France, Martinique	Dominica	4–1	5–1	2005 CONCACAF Gold Cup qualification
11.	17 January 2007	Hasely Crawford Stadium, Port of Spain, Trinidad and Tobago	Barbados	1–0	3–2	2007 CONCACAF Gold Cup qualification
12.	15 September 2008	Stade Louis Achille, Fort-de-France, Martinique	Saint Vincent and the Grenadines	1–0	3–0	2009 CONCACAF Gold Cup qualification
13.	15 September 2008	Stade Louis Achille, Fort-de-France, Martinique	Saint Vincent and the Grenadines	2–0	3–0	2009 CONCACAF Gold Cup qualification
14.	19 September 2008	Stade Louis Achille, Fort-de-France, Martinique	Anguilla	1–0	3–1	2009 CONCACAF Gold Cup qualification
15.	24 September 2008	Marville Stadium, Saint-Malo, France	Guadeloupe	1–0	1–0	2008 Coupe de l'Outre-Mer
16.	23 September 2010	Parc des Sports des Maisons Rouges, Bry-sur-Marne, France	Tahiti	2–1	4–1	2010 Coupe de l'Outre-Mer
17.	23 September 2010	Parc des Sports des Maisons Rouges, Bry-sur-Marne, France	Tahiti	4–1	4–1	2010 Coupe de l'Outre-Mer
18.	26 September 2010	Stade Henri Longuet, Viry-Châtillon, France	New Caledonia	1–0	4–0	2010 Coupe de l'Outre-Mer
19.	26 September 2010	Stade Henri Longuet, Viry-Châtillon, France	New Caledonia	4–0	4–0	2010 Coupe de l'Outre-Mer
