= Trophée du Conseil Général =

The Trophée du Conseil Général is a knockout tournament of the Martinique football.

== Winners ==
- 1997 : Club Franciscain (Le François)
- 1998 : Aiglon (Le Lamentin)
- 1999 : Club Franciscain (Le François)
- 2000 : Samaritaine (Ste.-Marie) 3-2 Club Franciscain (Le François)
- 2001 : Club Franciscain (Le François) 2-1 Stade Spiritain (St.-Esprit)
- 2002 : Club Franciscain (Le François) 1-0 Aiglon (Le Lamentin)
- 2003 : Club Franciscain (Le François) 4-3 CS Case-Pilote
- 2004 : Club Franciscain (Le François) 1-0 RC Rivière-Pilote
- 2005 : cancelled
- 2006 : Club Franciscain (Le François) 10-0 Good Luck de Fort-de-France
- 2007 : Club Franciscain (Le François) 3-0 RC Rivière-Pilote
- 2008 : Club Franciscain (Le François) 0-0 RC Rivière-Pilote [4-3 pen]
- 2009 : Club Franciscain (Le François) 4-1 AS Morne-des-Esses
- 2010 : CS Bélimois 2-2 RC Rivière-Pilote [4-2 pen]
- 2011 : Club Colonial (Fort-de-France) 5-0 Club Peléen (Morne Rouge)
- 2012 : RC Rivière-Pilote 2-0 US Riveraine
- 2013 : Club Colonial (Fort-de-France) 2-1 Samaritaine (Ste.-Marie)
- 2014 : Club Colonial (Fort-de-France) 2-0 CS Case-Pilote
- 2015 : Golden Lion FC (Saint-Joseph) 3-2 Excelsior (Schoelcher)
- 2016 : Golden Lion FC (Saint-Joseph) 6-0 JS Eucalyptus
- 2017 : Club Franciscain (Le François) 2-0 Samaritaine (Ste.-Marie)
- 2018 : Club Franciscain (Le François) 2-2 Golden Lion FC (Saint-Joseph) [4-2 pen]
- 2019 : Club Franciscain (Le François) 3-0 Golden Lion FC (Saint-Joseph)
- 2020 : Samaritaine (Ste.-Marie) 0-0 Club Franciscain (Le François) [5-4 pen]
- 2021 :
