= 2017–18 Coupe de France preliminary rounds =

2017–18 Coupe de France
Coupe Charles Simon

Tournament details
- Country: France

The 2017–18 Coupe de France preliminary rounds made up the qualifying competition to decide which teams took part in the main competition from round 7. This was the 101st season of the most important football cup in France. The competition was organised by the French Football Federation (FFF) and was open to all clubs in French football, as well as clubs from the overseas departments and territories (Guadeloupe, French Guiana, Martinique, Mayotte, New Caledonia (qualification via 2017 New Caledonia Cup), Tahiti (qualification via 2017 Tahiti Cup), Réunion, and Saint Martin).

The Preliminary rounds took place between February and October 2017.

== Sixth round ==
=== Overseas departments and territories ===
==== Mayotte ====
This match was played on 14 October 2017.

Tie no	Home team (tier)	Score	Away team (tier)
1.	(Mayotte) FC Mtsapéré (DH)	2–3	Diables Noirs (DH) (Mayotte)

Note: Mayotte League structure (no promotion to French League structure):
Division d'Honneur (DH)
Division d'Honneur Territoriale (DHT)
Promotion d'Honneur (PH)

==== Réunion ====
These matches were played on 21 and 22 October 2017.

Tie no	Home team (tier)	Score	Away team (tier)
1.	(Réunion) AS Excelsior (R1)	1–0	JS Saint-Pierroise (R1) (Réunion)
2.	(Réunion) AJ Petite-Île (R1)	1–0	La Tamponnaise (R2) (Réunion)

Note: Reúnion League structure (no promotion to French League structure):
Régionale 1 (R1)
Régionale 2 (R2)
D2 Départemental (D2D)

==== French Guiana ====
These matches were played on 13 and 14 October 2017.

Tie no	Home team (tier)	Score	Away team (tier)
1.	(French Guiana) US de Matoury (R1)	1–1 (4–5 p)	ASE Matoury (R1) (French Guiana)
2.	(French Guiana) CSC Cayenne (R1)	1–4	ASC Le Geldar (R1) (French Guiana)

Note: French Guiana League structure (no promotion to French League structure):
Regional 1 (R1)
Regional 2 (R2)

==== Martinique ====
These matches were played on 20 and 21 October 2017.

Tie no	Home team (tier)	Score	Away team (tier)
1.	(Martinique) Club Colonial (R1)	1–0	Club Franciscain (R1) (Martinique)
2.	(Martinique) Golden Lion FC (R1)	4–0	Good Luck (R1) (Martinique)

Note: Martinique League structure (no promotion to French League structure):
Régionale 1 (R1)
Régionale 2 (R2)
Régionale 3 (R3)

==== Guadeloupe ====
These matches were played between 18 and 25 October 2017.

Tie no	Home team (tier)	Score	Away team (tier)
1.	(Guadeloupe) Unité Ste Rosienne (R1)	0-1	CS Moulien (R1) (Guadeloupe)
2.	(Guadeloupe) SC Baie-Mahault (R2)	0–4	L'Etoile de Morne-à-l'Eau (R1) (Guadeloupe)

Note: Guadeloupe League structure (no promotion to French League structure):
Ligue Régionale 1 (R1)
Ligue Régionale 2 (R2)
Ligue Régionale 3 (R3)

=== Paris-Île-de-France ===
These matches were played on 21 and 22 October 2017.

Tie no	Home team (tier)	Score	Away team (tier)
1.	FC Mantes (4)	0–1	Blanc Mesnil SF (5)
2.	Red Star FC (3)	1–1 (3–4 p)	FC Fleury 91 (4)
3.	US Créteil-Lusitanos (3)	0–3	US Lusitanos Saint-Maur (4)
4.	ES Marly-la-Ville (9)	0–2	L'Entente SSG (3)
5.	US Rungis (6)	2–2 (5–4 p)	FC Plessis-Robinson (7)
6.	US Persan (10)	2–4	Racing Colombes 92 (5)
7.	Paray FC (8)	1–5	FCM Aubervilliers (5)
8.	ASC La Courneuve (10)	4–2	US Grigny (8)
9.	US Ivry (5)	3–4	CO Les Ulis (5)
10.	St Brice FC (6)	0–0 (4–3 p)	St Denis US (7)
11.	FCM Garges-Les-Gonesse (10)	1–2	AC Houilles (8)

=== Bourgogne-Franche-Comté ===
These matches were played on 21 and 22 October 2017.

Tie no	Home team (tier)	Score	Away team (tier)
1.	CO Avallon (5)	3–1	Jura Sud Foot (4)
2.	CA Pontarlier (5)	6–1	UF Mâconnais (6)
3.	AS Beaune (7)	0–1 (a.e.t.)	ASM Belfort (4)
4.	FC Morteau-Montlebon (6)	2–1	US La Charité (6)
5.	FC 4 Rivières 70 (7)	3–2	AS Quetigny (5)
6.	Stade Auxerrois (6)	0–4	Sud Nivernais Imphy Decize (6)
7.	CSL Chenôve (9)	0–1	FC Gueugnon (5)
8.	ASC Saint-Apollinaire (5)	0–1	FC Grandvillars (6)

=== Centre-Val de Loire ===
These matches were played on 21 and 22 October 2017.

Tie no	Home team (tier)	Score	Away team (tier)
1.	FC St Georges-sur-Eure (7)	0–4	Avoine OCC (5)
2.	SO Romorantin (4)	4–0	FC Ouest Tourangeau (5)
3.	Saint-Pryvé Saint-Hilaire FC (4)	1–2	Vierzon FC (5)
4.	USM Saran (6)	0–2	FC Chartres (4)

=== Grand Est ===
The three sectors in Grand Est region were combined for the sixth round. These matches were played on 21 and 22 October 2017.

Tie no	Home team (tier)	Score	Away team (tier)
1.	Sarreguemines FC (5)	0–2	ASC Biesheim (5)
2.	AS Huningue (8)	0–6	FCSR Haguenau (5)
3.	ES Thaon (6)	2–1	AS Prix-lès-Mézières (5)
4.	FC Mulhouse (5)	1–1 (5–4 p)	FC Lunéville (5)
5.	AGIIR Florival (8)	0–2	SC Schiltigheim (4)
6.	FC Still 1930 (8)	2–0 (a.e.t.)	CS Fegersheim (9)
7.	FC Geispolsheim 01 (7)	2–1	US Reipertswiller (6)
8.	FC Metzing (11)	0–2	US Raon-l'Étape (4)
9.	FC Kembs Réunis (7)	1–2	FC Hégenheim (6)
10.	US Forbach (6)	2–1 (a.e.t.)	AS Illzach Modenheim (6)
11.	APM Metz (6)	0–1 (a.e.t.)	FC Saint-Louis Neuweg (4)
12.	FC Bogny (8)	0–5	Étoile Naborienne St Avold (6)
13.	FCA Troyes (6)	4–1	Châlons FCO (7)
14.	UL Rombas (8)	2–1	MJEP Cormontreuil (6)
15.	SR Saint-Dié (7)	0–6	CSO Amnéville (6)
16.	FC Porcien (9)	0–1	Chaumont FC (6)
17.	GS Haroué-Benney (8)	0–7	SAS Épinal (4)
18.	FC Trémery (5)	2–0	RS Amanvillers (6)
19.	AS Vagney (8)	2–3	RC Épernay Champagne (5)
20.	US Ittenheim (8)	5–1	FC Bantzenheim (8)

=== Nouvelle-Aquitaine ===
These matches were played on 21 and 22 October 2017.

Tie no	Home team (tier)	Score	Away team (tier)
1.	Trélissac FC (4)	0–2	Bergerac Périgord FC (4)
2.	Pau FC (3)	0–1	Stade Bordelais (4)
3.	Aviron Bayonnais FC (5)	2–1	US Lège Cap Ferret (5)
4.	CA St Savin-St Germain (8)	2–4	Langon FC (6)
5.	US Marennaise (9)	0–1	CS Feytiat (5)
6.	Thouars Foot 79 (6)	0–1	Angoulême CFC (5)
7.	OFC Ruelle (8)	1–6	FCE Mérignac Arlac (5)
8.	SO Châtellerault (6)	1–2	Limoges FC (4)
9.	AS Aixois (6)	2–5	FC Bressuire (5)
10.	Stade Ygossais (8)	2–0	FC Chauray (6)
11.	AS Panazol (9)	1–2	La Brède FC (6)
12.	FC Pays Argentonnais (10)	2–2 (4–1 p)	FC Marmande 47 (6)

=== Auvergne-Rhône-Alpes ===
These matches were played on 21 and 22 October 2017.

Tie no	Home team (tier)	Score	Away team (tier)
1.	FCO Firminy-Insersport (8)	0–1	AS Lyon-Duchère (3)
2.	Cluses-Scionzier FC (6)	4–3	AS Saint-Priest (4)
3.	AS Bron Grand Lyon (7)	5–1	FCS Rumilly Albanais (8)
4.	FC Échirolles (6)	1–3	FC Villefranche (4)
5.	Annecy FC (4)	4–3 (a.e.t.)	FC Vaulx-en-Velin (5)
6.	AS Sud Ardèche (7)	2–1	AS Chavanay (7)
7.	FC Chamalières (5)	2–0 (a.e.t.)	FC Espaly (6)
8.	US Feurs (7)	1–0	FC Aurillac Arpajon Cantal Auvergne (5)
9.	ES Tarentaise (7)	1–0	FC Bords de Saône (7)
10.	AS Cheminots St Germain (8)	0–3	AS Yzeure (4)
11.	AC Seyssinet (7)	3–1	SA Thiers (5)
12.	Hauts Lyonnais (6)	3–0	Ytrac Foot (5)
13.	Espérance Ceyratois Football (8)	0–7	ASF Andrézieux (4)
14.	Football Mont-Pilat (9)	3–1	AS Algérienne Chambon-Feugerolles (7)
15.	Velay FC (6)	0–2	Le Puy Foot 43 Auvergne (4)
16.	FC Valdaine (8)	1–0	ES Vallières (6)
17.	FC Foron (10)	1–4	FC La Tour-St Clair (7)
18.	US Divonne (8)	0–1	FC Vallée de la Gresse (7)
19.	Monts d'Or Azergues Foot (4)	0–1	Grenoble Foot 38 (3)

=== Méditerranée ===
These matches were played on 21 and 22 October 2017.

Tie no	Home team (tier)	Score	Away team (tier)
1.	AS Gémenos (5)	1–0	Sporting Club Toulon (4)
2.	ARC Cavaillon (8)	2–6	Marseille Consolat (3)
3.	Hyères FC (4)	0–0 (3–4 p)	FC Martigues (4)
4.	Stade Marseillais UC (7)	0–1	AS Cagnes-Le Cros (7)
5.	US Marseille Endoume (5)	2–1	EUGA Ardziv (6)

=== Occitanie ===
==== Midi-Pyrénées ====
These matches were played on 21 October 2017.

Tie no	Home team (tier)	Score	Away team (tier)
1.	Montauban FCTG (7)	1–1 (4–2 p)	Pradines-St Vincent-Douelle-Mercuès Olt (6)
2.	Saint-Alban Aucamville FC (7)	0–3	Tarbes Pyrénées Football (4)
3.	AS Tournefeuille (7)	4–3	Luzenac AP (5)
4.	Balma SC (5)	5–0	AS Fleurance-La Sauvetat (6)
5.	Auch Football (6)	2–4	US Colomiers Football (4)
6.	Toulouse Rodéo FC (5)	0–1	Rodez AF (3)

==== Languedoc-Roussillon ====
These matches were played on 21 and 22 October 2017.

Tie no	Home team (tier)	Score	Away team (tier)
1.	ES Pays d'Uzes (6)	0–2	AS Fabrègues (5)
2.	AS Perpignan Méditerranée (7)	1–2	Canet Roussillon FC (5)
3.	FC Alberes Argelès (6)	2–1	ES Paulhan-Pézenas (4)
4.	FC Bagnols Pont (6)	0–1	Olympique Alès (5)
5.	SC Anduzien (7)	3–1	Entente St Clément-Montferrier (6)

=== Corsica ===
These matches were played on 21 and 22 October 2017.

Tie no	Home team (tier)	Score	Away team (tier)
1.	AS Furiani-Agliani (4)	1–1 (6–5 p)	SC Bastia (5)
2.	GC Lucciana (5)	4–1	USC Corte (6)

=== Pays de la Loire ===
These matches were played on 21 and 22 October 2017.

Tie no	Home team (tier)	Score	Away team (tier)
1.	Mareuil SC (8)	0–2	SO Cholet (3)
2.	Voltigeurs de Châteaubriant (5)	1–5 (a.e.t.)	Les Herbiers VF (3)
3.	Vendée Fontenay Foot (4)	0–0 (3–5 p)	US Changé (5)
4.	Pouzages Bocage FC (7)	1–3 (a.e.t.)	Le Mans FC (4)
5.	AS Mulsanne-Teloché (5)	1–3	Ancienne Château-Gontier (6)
6.	FC Challans (5)	0–2	JSC Bellevue Nantes (6)
7.	AC Chapelain Foot (7)	1–1 (4–2 p)	St Nazaire AF (6)
8.	St Sébastien FC (7)	0–1	TVEC Les Sables-d'Olonne (6)
9.	FC Essartais (7)	2–1	Orvault SF (6)
10.	NDC Angers (8)	0–1	Stade Lavallois (3)
11.	Olympique Saumur FC (6)	3–0	SO Maine (6)

=== Bretagne ===
These matches were played on 21 and 22 October 2017.

Tie no	Home team (tier)	Score	Away team (tier)
1.	Plaintel SF (7)	0–5	Stade Briochin (4)
2.	US Montagnarde (5)	1–3	US Concarneau (3)
3.	AS Plomelin (8)	2–0	Cormorans Sportif de Penmarc'h (7)
4.	Séné FC (8)	2–1 (a.e.t.)	US Cléder (7)
5.	US Liffré (8)	4–0	Quimper Ergué-Armel FC (8)
6.	Cercle Paul Bert Bréquigny (6)	0–1	Saint-Colomban Sportive Locminé (5)
7.	Landerneau FC (6)	0–4	AS Vitré (4)
8.	EA St Renan (6)	0–1	FC Quimperlois (7)
9.	Bodilis-Plougar FC (7)	0–1	CS Plédran (7)
10.	Jeunes d'Argentré (6)	1–2	Vannes OC (5)
11.	Stella Maris Douarnenez (7)	2–0	Stade Pleudihennais (8)
12.	OC Cesson (6)	0–1	Plancoët-Arguenon FC (7)
13.	Loudéac OSC (8)	0–1	Stade Pontivyen (6)
14.	Noyal-Brécé FC (7)	0–3	US Saint-Malo (4)

=== Normandie ===
These matches were played on 21 and 22 October 2017.

Tie no	Home team (tier)	Score	Away team (tier)
1.	Saint Marcel Foot (7)	1–2	AF Virois (6)
2.	Bayeux FC (5)	0–2	US Granville (4)
3.	JS St Nicolas-d'Aliermont (7)	0–4	Évreux FC 27 (5)
4.	FC Rouen (5)	0–0 (4–2 p)	ESM Gonfreville (5)
5.	Stade Porte Normande Vernon (7)	0–7	US Avranches (3)
6.	ES Troarn (8)	1–4 (a.e.t.)	FC Saint-Lô Manche (5)
7.	LC Bretteville-sur-Odon (6)	1–1 (5–4 p)	CMS Oissel (5)
8.	FAC Alizay (9)	1–4	ASPTT Caen (6)

=== Hauts-de-France ===
These matches were played on 21 and 22 October and 5 November 2017.

Tie no	Home team (tier)	Score	Away team (tier)
1.	US Ouvriere Albert (9)	0–4	USL Dunkerque (3)
2.	AC Cambrai (6)	3–2	Olympique Grande-Synthe (5)
3.	US St André (10)	0–1 (Note: The original fixture on 22 October was abandoned after 22 minutes (with the scoreline 0–0) by the referee, due to death threats from a member of the crowd. Match was resumed on 5 November by order of the Ligue de Hauts-de-France.)	Entente Itancourt-Neuville (6)
4.	AG Grenay (10)	0–0 (4–5 p)	US Nœux-les-Mines (7)
5.	US Ribemont Mezieres FC (8)	1–2 (a.e.t.)	SC Hazebrouck (6)
6.	CS Avion (7)	0–0 (2–4 p)	US Choisy-au-Bac (6)
7.	FC Quarouble (9)	2–1	Tergnier FC (7)
8.	US Wattrelos (9)	0–0 (2–3 p)	Saint-Amand FC (5)
9.	US Roye-Noyon (5)	0–0 (6–7 p)	AFC Compiègne (6)
10.	SC Coquelles (9)	0–3	US Chantilly (6)
11.	AS Marck (6)	0–1	FC Chambly (3)
12.	US St Maurice Loos-en-Gohelle (8)	0–2	US Boulogne (3)
13.	IC La Sentinelle (8)	0–1	Arras FA (4)
14.	Stade Portelois (6)	1–1 (0–3 p)	AS Beauvais Oise (4)
15.	OS Fives (7)	2–2 (5–3 p)	US Tourcoing FC (5)
16.	US Noyelles-sous-Lens (9)	0–5	USM Senlisienne (5)
17.	US Vimy (6)	4–0	AC Amiens (4)
18.	ES Caudry (9)	0–5	Feignies Aulnoye FC (5)
19.	AS Glisy (12)	0–4	FC Porto Portugais Amiens (7)
20.	Roubaix SC (7)	0–3	Olympique Marcquois (6)
