= Grégory Pastel =

French footballer (born 1990)

Personal information
- Full name: Grégory Pastel
- Date of birth: September 18, 1990 (age 36)
- Place of birth: Fort-de-France, Martinique
- Height: 1.80 m (5 ft 11 in)
- Position: Forward

Team information
- Current team: Aiglon du Lamentin

Youth career
- –2007: RC Rivière-Pilote
- 2008–2011: AS Nancy

Senior career*
Years	Team	Apps	(Gls)
2011–2012	FC Mulhouse	31	(10)
2013	US Ivry	11	(1)
2014–2019	RC Rivière-Pilote		
2019–	Aiglon du Lamentin		

International career
2014–	Martinique		
- * Club domestic league appearances and goals

Grégory Pastel (born 18 September 1990) is a professional footballer who plays as a forward and internationally for Martinique.

Pastel spent 3 years with AS Nancy and a year at FC Mulhouse before signing for US Ivry in January 2013. On leaving US Ivry, he returned to Martinique, rejoining RC Rivière-Pilote.

He made his debut for Martinique in 2014. He was in the Martinique Gold Cup squad for the 2017 tournament.
