= 2014–15 Martinique Championnat National =

In the 2014–15 season of the Martinique Championnat National, the top league of professional football in Martinique, the Golden Lion FC team from Saint-Joseph won the championship for the first time.

== Table ==
 1.Golden Lion FC (Saint-Joseph)              26  22  2  2  82-16  94  Champions
 2.Club Franciscain (Le François)             26  18  5  3  68-24  85
 3.Club Colonial (Fort-de-France)             26  18  3  5  54-18  82
 4.Aiglon (Lamentin)                          26  13  6  7  39-25  71
 5.Golden Star (Fort-de-France)               26  11  7  8  50-27  66
 6.RC Rivière-Pilote                          26  11  7  8  39-23  66 
 7.CS Case-Pilote                             26  10  6 10  38-46  62
 8.Essor-Préchotain (Prêcheur)                26  11  3 12  46-33  62 
 9.Emulation (Schoelcher)                     26   8  9  9  33-28  59
10.Samaritaine (Sainte-Marie)                 26   9  7 10  55-38  57 
11.US Marinoise (Marin)                       26   5  9 12  21-31  50
12.US Robert                                  26   5  8 13  30-51  49  Relegated
13.Réal de Tartane                            26   4  2 20  27-87  40  Relegated
14.CS Bélimois (Lamentin)                     26   0  0 26  14-149 26  Relegated
