= Marcel Aurélia =

Martinican footballer (born 1950)

Marcel Aurélia (born 28 February 1950) is a Martinican former footballer who played as a winger.

== Early life ==
He was born in 1950 in Martinique. He is a native of La Trinité, Martinique.

== Career ==
In 1974, he signed for French Ligue 1 side Nantes. He was a Martinique international.

== Style of play ==
He mainly operated as a winger. He was known for his speed.

== Personal life ==
He has been nicknamed "Micky". He has worked as a radiologist.
