= Coupe de la Martinique =

Knockout tournament of Martinique football

The Coupe de la Martinique is the top knockout tournament of Martinique football. It was created in 1953.

== Winners ==
- 1953 : Golden Star
- 1954 : Club Franciscain
- 1955 : Club Colonial
- 1956 : Good Luck
- 1957 : Golden Star
- 1958 : Golden Star
- 1959 : Club Colonial
- 1960 : US Robert
- 1961 : US Robert
- 1962 : Club Colonial
- 1963 : Golden Star
- 1964 : Aussaut de St Pierre
- 1965 : Aussaut de St Pierre
- 1966 : Aussaut de St Pierre
- 1967 : Aussaut de St Pierre
- 1968 : Aussaut de St Pierre
- 1969 : Club Franciscain
- 1970 : Golden Star
- 1971–72 : not known
- 1973 : Good Luck
- 1974 : Good Luck
- 1975–76 : not known
- 1977 : CS Case-Pilote
- 1978 : RC Rivière-Pilote
- 1979 : Good Luck
- 1980 : Club Colonial
- 1981 : RC Rivière-Pilote 2–1 US Robert
- 1982: Club Peléen
- 1983: La Gauloise de Trinité
- 1984: US Robert
- 1985: Réal Tartane
- 1986 : Club Franciscain
- 1987 : Club Franciscain
- 1988–89 : not known
- 1990 : Club Franciscain
- 1991: La Gauloise de Trinité
- 1992–94 : not known
- 1995 : Aiglon du Lamentin
- 1996 : Aiglon du Lamentin
- 1997 : not known
- 1998 : Club Franciscain 4-3 (aet) Aiglon du Lamentin
- 1999 : Club Franciscain
- 2000 : Aussaut de St Pierre 2–2 (aet, 4–2 pen) Club Franciscain
- 2001 : Club Franciscain 2–1 Réveil Sportif de Gros-Morne
- 2002 : Club Franciscain 1–0 RC Rivière-Pilote
- 2003 : Club Franciscain 1–0 New Club
- 2004 : Club Franciscain 2–2 (aet, 13–12 pen) US Robert
- 2005 : Club Franciscain 5–1 Club Colonial
- 2006 : CS Case-Pilote 1–0 Gri-Gri Pilotin
- 2006–07 : Club Franciscain 4–1 Samaritaine
- 2007–08 : Club Franciscain 2–1 Golden Star
- 2008–09 : Aiglon du Lamentin 2–0 Club Franciscain
- 2009–10 : CS Case-Pilote 2–1 Rapid Club
- 2010–11 : RC Rivière-Pilote 2–2 (aet, 5–4 pen) Golden Lion
- 2011–12 : Club Franciscain 2–1 Essor-Préchotain
- 2012–13 : RC Rivière-Pilote 2–1 Club Franciscain
- 2013–14 : Club Colonial 1–0 Golden Lion
- 2014–15 : Club Franciscain 2–2 (aet, 3–2 pen) Club Colonial
- 2015–16 : Golden Lion 0–0 (aet, 4–3 pen) Club Franciscain
- 2016–17 : Samaritaine 2–1 Good Luck
- 2017–18 : Club Franciscain 2–1 RC Rivière-Pilote
- 2018–19 : Golden Lion 4–0 Essor-Préchotain
- 2019–20 : Club Franciscain 1–0 Aiglon du Lamentin
- 2020–21 : CO Trénelle 5–1 US Robert
- 2021–22: Club Franciscain 2–0 Golden Lion
- 2022–23: Golden Lion 2–1 Club Colonial
- 2023–24: Club Franciscain 2–1 Golden Lion
- 2024–25: Club Franciscain 1–0 RC Saint-Joseph
- 2025-26: AS Morne-des-Esses 2-1 Club Franciscain
