= Assaut de Saint-Pierre =

Football and athletics club in Martinique

Assaut
- Full name: Assaut de Saint-Pierre
- Nickname: ASP
- Founded: 1942
- Ground: Stade Paul Pierre-Charles
- Capacity: 3,000
- President: Dominique Philemond-Montout
- Manager: Stéphane Barthelery; Jean-Marc Grégoire; Stéphen Saint-Just
- League: Martinique Promotion d'Honneur
- 2018–19: Martinique Championnat National, 14th of 14 (relegated)
Home colours	Away colours	Third colours

Assaut de Saint-Pierre is a football and athletics club of Martinique, playing in the town of Saint-Pierre. Founded in 1942, the club's colours are blue and white.

== History ==
Assaut de Saint-Pierre was founded in 1942. The club enjoyed its most successful period in the 1960s, and was one of the strongest teams in Martinique and the French West Indies during this time. In this decade alone, the club won a total of fifteen trophies.

== Notable former players ==
1960s

- Yvon Chomet
- Yvon Lutbert
- Roger Lutbert
- Lucien Lafayette
- Gérard Alton
- Serge Martial
- Serge Belleroche
- Louis-Joseph Vestris
- Georges Bannais
- Yves Ramassamy
- Floriva Modeste
- Valentin Louison
- Marcel Aurélia
- Joseph Jean

Frédéric Betzi (manager)

1990s and 2000s

- Fabrice Reuperné
- Ludovic Mirande
- Yannick Ancarno

== Honors ==
=== Domestic ===
- Martinique Championnat National (5): 1963, 1966, 1967, 1968, 1973
- Coupe de la Martinique (6): 1964, 1965, 1966, 1967, 1968, 2000
- Championnat Antilles-Guyane (3): 1963, 1966, 1968
- Coupe de France Zone Martinique (2): 1966, 1985
- Coupe Théolade (2): 1963, 1968
