= Martinique Championnat National =

Top-level association football league

- Organising body: Ligue de Football de la Martinique
- Founded: 1919
- Country: Martinique
- Confederation: CONCACAF
- Number of clubs: 14
- Level on pyramid: 1
- Relegation to: Martinique Promotion d'Honneur
- Domestic cup: Coupe de la Martinique
- International cup: CFU Club Shield
- Current champions: RC Saint-Joseph (2025–26)
- Most championships: Club Franciscain (20)
- Top scorer: Kevin Parsemain (163 goals)
- Current: 2026–27 Martinique Championnat National

Martinique Championnat National is an association football league in Martinique, and the highest level of the Ligue de Football de la Martinique. Founded in 1919, the league is contested by fourteen participating clubs. The last four placed clubs are relegated to the Martinique Promotion d'Honneur.

== Participating clubs ==
Locations of the 2024–25 Martinique Championnat National teams
- Aiglon du Lamentin
- AS Club Péléen
- AS New Club
- AS Samaritaine
- CS Case-Pilote
- Club Colonial
- Club Franciscain
- CO Trénelle
- Emulation
- Espoir Sainte-Luce
- Golden Lion FC
- Golden Star
- RC Saint-Joseph
- US Diamantinoise

== Champions ==
| Ed. | Season | Champions |
|---|---|---|
| 1 | 1919 | Intrépide |
| 2 | 1920 | Colonial |
| 3 | 1921 | Colonial |
| 4 | 1922 | Colonial |
| 5 | 1923 | Colonial |
| 6 | 1924 | Colonial |
| 7 | 1925 | Intrépide |
| 8 | 1926 | Colonial |
| 9 | 1927 | Golden Star |
| 10 | 1928 | Golden Star |
| 11 | 1929 | Golden Star |
| 12 | 1930 | Colonial |
| 13 | 1931 | Colonial |
| 14 | 1932 | Stade Spiritain |
| 15 | 1933 | Intrépide |
| – | 1934 | The league was not held |
| 16 | 1935 | Colonial |
| 17 | 1936 | Golden Star |
| 18 | 1937 | Golden Star |
| 19 | 1938 | Colonial |
| 20 | 1939 | Golden Star |
| 21 | 1940 | Colonial |
| 22 | 1941 | Colonial |
| 23 | 1942 | Colonial |
| 24 | 1943 | Colonial |
| 25 | 1944 | La Gauloise de Trinité |
| 26 | 1945 | Good Luck |
| 27 | 1946 | Aigle Sportif |
| 28 | 1947 | Aigle Sportif |
| 29 | 1948 | Golden Star |
| 30 | 1949 | Colonial |
| 31 | 1950 | La Gauloise de Trinité |
| 32 | 1951 | La Gauloise de Trinité |
| 33 | 1952 | Golden Star |
| 34 | 1953 | Golden Star |
| 35 | 1954 | Golden Star |
| 36 | 1955 | La Gauloise de Trinité |
| 37 | 1956 | Golden Star |
| 38 | 1957 | Good Luck |
| 39 | 1958 | Golden Star |
| 40 | 1959 | Golden Star |
| 41 | 1960 | Stade Spiritain |
| 42 | 1961 | Stade Spiritain |
| 43 | 1962 | Golden Star |
| 44 | 1963 | Aussaut |
| 45 | 1964 | Colonial |
| 46 | 1965 | Colonial |
| 47 | 1966 | Aussaut |
| 48 | 1967 | Aussaut |
| 49 | 1968 | Aussaut |
| 50 | 1969 | Éclair Rivière Salée |
| 51 | 1969–70 | Franciscain |
| 52 | 1970–71 | CS Vauclinois |
| 53 | 1971–72 | Colonial |
| 54 | 1972–73 | Aussaut |
| 55 | 1973–74 | CS Vauclinois |
| 56 | 1974–75 | Samaritaine |
| 57 | 1975–76 | Golden Star |
| 58 | 1976–77 | Renaissance |
| 59 | 1977–78 | Renaissance |
| 60 | 1978–79 | Renaissance |
| 61 | 1979–80 | La Gauloise de Trinité |
| 62 | 1980–81 | Samaritaine |
| 63 | 1981–82 | RC Rivière-Pilote |
| 64 | 1982–83 | not known |
| 65 | 1983–84 | Aiglon du Lamentin |
| 66 | 1984–85 | Olympique du Marin |
| 67 | 1985–86 | Golden Star |
| 68 | 1986–87 | not known |
| 69 | 1987–88 | Excelsior |
| 70 | 1988–89 | Excelsior |
| 71 | 1989–90 | US Marinoise |
| 72 | 1990–91 | Aiglon du Lamentin |
| 73 | 1991–92 | Aiglon du Lamentin |
| 74 | 1992–93 | US Robert |
| 75 | 1993–94 | Franciscain |
| 76 | 1994–95 | US Marinoise |
| 77 | 1995–96 | Franciscain |
| 78 | 1996–97 | Franciscain |
| 79 | 1997–98 | Aiglon du Lamentin |
| 80 | 1998–99 | Franciscain |
| 81 | 1999–00 | Franciscain |
| 82 | 2000–01 | Franciscain |
| 83 | 2001–02 | Franciscain |
| 84 | 2002–03 | Franciscain |
| 85 | 2003–04 | Franciscain |
| 86 | 2004–05 | Franciscain |
| 87 | 2005–06 | Franciscain |
| 88 | 2006–07 | Franciscain |
| 89 | 2007–08 | RC Rivière-Pilote |
| 90 | 2008–09 | Franciscain |
| 91 | 2009–10 | RC Rivière-Pilote |
| 92 | 2010–11 | Colonial |
| 93 | 2011–12 | RC Rivière-Pilote |
| 94 | 2012–13 | Franciscain |
| 95 | 2013–14 | Franciscain |
| 96 | 2014–15 | Golden Lion |
| 97 | 2015–16 | Golden Lion |
| 98 | 2016–17 | Franciscain |
| 99 | 2017–18 | Franciscain |
| 100 | 2018–19 | Franciscain |
| 101 | 2019–20 | Samaritaine |
| 102 | 2020–21 | Golden Lion |
| 103 | 2021–22 | Golden Lion |
| 104 | 2022–23 | Golden Lion |
| 105 | 2023–24 | Franciscain |
| 106 | 2024–25 | RC Saint-Joseph |
| 107 | 2025–26 | RC Saint-Joseph |

== Performances ==
| Club | Titles | Winning seasons |
|---|---|---|
| Club Franciscain | 20 | 1969–70, 1993–94, 1995–96, 1996–97, 1998–99, 1999–00, 2000–01, 2001–02, 2002–03, 2003–04, 2004–05, 2005–06, 2006–07, 2008–09, 2012–13, 2013–14, 2016–17, 2017–18, 2018–19, 2023–24 |
| Club Colonial | 19 | 1920, 1921, 1922, 1923, 1924, 1926, 1930, 1931, 1935, 1938, 1941, 1941, 1942, 1943, 1949, 1964, 1965, 1971–72, 2010–11 |
| Golden Star | 16 | 1927, 1928, 1929, 1936, 1937, 1939, 1948, 1952, 1953, 1954, 1956, 1958, 1959, 1962, 1975–76, 1985–86 |
| Aussaut de St Pierre | 5 | 1963, 1966, 1967, 1968, 1972–73 |
| La Gauloise de Trinité | 5 | 1944, 1950, 1951, 1955, 1979–80 |
| Golden Lion | 5 | 2014–15, 2015–16, 2020–21, 2021–22, 2022-23 |
| Aiglon du Lamentin | 4 | 1983–84, 1990–91, 1991–92, 1997–98 |
| RC Rivière-Pilote | 4 | 1981–82, 2007–08, 2009–10, 2011–12 |
| Intrépide | 3 | 1919, 1925, 1933 |
| Renaissance | 3 | 1976–77, 1977–78, 1978–79 |
| AS Samaritaine | 3 | 1974–75, 1980–81, 2019–20 |
| Stade Spiritain | 3 | 1932, 1960, 1961 |
| Excelsior | 2 | 1987–88, 1988–89 |
| Aigle Sportif | 2 | 1946, 1947 |
| Good Luck | 2 | 1945, 1957 |
| US Marinoise | 2 | 1989–90, 1994–95 |
| CS Vauclinois | 2 | 1970–71, 1973–74 |
| RC Saint-Joseph | 2 | 2024–25, 2025–26 |
| Eclair | 1 | 1969–70 |
| Olympique du Marin | 1 | 1984–85 |
| US Robert | 1 | 1992–93 |

== Player records ==
=== Top goalscorers ===
| Year | Best scorers | Team | Goals |
|---|---|---|---|
| 1991–92 | Eric Jean-Louis | Aiglon du Lamentin | 16 |
| 2005–06 | (Martinique) Patrick Louis | Samaritaine | 25 |
| 2007–08 | (Martinique) Patrick Louis | Samaritaine | 18 |
| 2008–09 | (Martinique) Patrick Louis | Samaritaine | 19 |
| 2008–09 | Léonel Palméro | Franciscain | 19 |
| 2010–11 | (Martinique) Kevin Parsemain | Rivière-Pilote | 20 |
| 2019–20 | (Martinique) Killian Polomat | Trenelle | 7 |
| 2020–21 | (Martinique) Kevin Parsemain | Golden Lion | 16 |
| 2021–22 | (Martinique) Kevin Parsemain | Golden Lion | 22 |
| 2022–23 | (Martinique) Kevin Reuperné | New Club | 25 |
| 2023–24 | (Martinique) Alvyn Lamasine | Golden Lion | 25 |
| 2024-25 | (Martinique) Alvin Lamasine | Golden Lion | 24 |

=== Multiple hat-tricks ===
| Rank | Country | Player | Hat-tricks |
|---|---|---|---|
| 1 | (Martinique) | Thierry Catherine | 3 |
| 1 | (Martinique) | Gabriel Bilon | 3 |
| 1 | (Martinique) | Killian Polomat | 3 |
| 4 | (Martinique) | Stevyn Baker | 2 |
| 4 | (Martinique) | Alvyn Lamasine | 2 |
| 4 | (Martinique) | Andy Marny | 2 |
| 4 | (Martinique) | Rudy Varane | 2 |
| 8 | (Martinique) | Stéphane Abaul | 1 |
| 8 | (Martinique) | Jiovanie Barba | 1 |
| 8 | (Martinique) | Andy Bivard | 1 |
| 8 | (Martinique) | Andrikx Boulois | 1 |
| 8 | (Martinique) | Philippe Clervil | 1 |
| 8 | (Martinique) | Maël Crifar | 1 |
| 8 | (Martinique) | Axel Delor | 1 |
| 8 | (Martinique) | Alex Golvet | 1 |
| 8 | (Martinique) | Djénhael Maingé | 1 |
| 8 | (Martinique) | Kevin Parsemain | 1 |
| 8 | (Martinique) | Grégory Pastel | 1 |
| 8 | (Martinique) | Kennil Polius | 1 |
| 8 | (Martinique) | Truiller Ursulet | 1 |
