= AC Vert-Pré =

- Full name: Athlétic Club Vert-Pré
- Founded: 1950
- Ground: Stade Leon Duchamps, Vert-Pré, Martinique
- Chairman: Stéphan Paulette
- Manager: Alain Ardès
- League: Martinique Championnat National
- 2007/08: Promoted from Second Level
Home colours

AC Vert-Pré is a football club of Martinique, based in the eastern village Vert-Pré in the commune Le Robert.

Founded in 1950, the club plays in Martinique's first division, the Martinique Championnat National.
