= La Gauloise de Trinité (football) =

Football team of La Gauloise de Trinité

- Founded: 1920
- Stadium: Stade Louis Richer
- Capacity: 2,000
- League: Régional 2 Martinique; Group B

La Gauloise de Trinité is a football team located in La Trinité, Martinique. It is part of the multi-sport club La Gauloise de Trinité.

== History ==
The club of La Gauloise de Trinité was founded in 1920, and so was its football team.

Gauloise has won a total of five Martinique Championnat National, its last title coming in 1980. It has also won the Coupe de la Martinique on two occasions and has lost in the final two other times. The club has also participated in the Coupe de France preliminary rounds over the years, notably reaching the seventh round in the 1993–94 edition before losing 3–0 to French third-tier side Lorient.

== Honors ==
Domestic
Competition	Titles	Seasons
Martinique Championnat National	5	1944, 1950, 1951, 1955, 1980
Coupe de la Martinique	2	1983, 1991

== Notable players ==
- Jacques Laposte
- Dominique Pandor
- Patrick Percin
