= Stade Spiritain =

- Full name: Stade Spiritain
- Founded: 1922
- Ground: Stade Municipal, Saint-Esprit, Martinique
- Chairman: Gérald Kabile
- Manager: Félix Souchette
- League: Martinique Championnat National
Home colours

Stade Spiritain is a football club of Martinique from the city of Saint-Esprit.

They play in the Martinique's first division, the Martinique Championnat National.

== Honors ==
=== Domestic ===
- Martinique Championnat National (3): 1932, 1960, 1961.

== The club in the French football structure ==
- French Cup: 1 appearance

1962/63
