= US Robert =

- Full name: Union Sportive Robert
- Founded: 1903
- Ground: Stade Georges Spitz, Le Robert, Martinique
- Capacity: 2,000
- Chairman: Serge Pidéry
- Manager: Guy-Albert Jésoph
- League: Martinique Promotion d'Honneur
- 2025–26: 13th (Relegated)
Home colours

Union Sportive Robert is a professional football club based in Le Robert, Martinique. The club plays in the Martinique Promotion d'Honneur, the second level of Martinique football, and plays its home matches at Stade Georges Spitz. Founded in 1903, it is the oldest club in Martinique.

== Honors ==
=== Domestic ===
- Martinique Championnat National (1): 1993.
- Coupe de la Martinique (2): 1960, 1961.

== The club in the French football structure ==
- French Cup: 1 appearance

1995/96

== Performance in CONCACAF competitions ==
- CFU Club Championship: 1 appearance

2002 – Final Round – Group B – 3rd place – 0 pts (stage 2 of 2)

- CONCACAF Champions' Cup: 2 appearances

1994 – Third place match – Lost against (El Salvador) Alianza F.C. 4–2 on penalty kicks after 0 – 0
1992 – Second Round – Lost against (Guadeloupe) L'Etoile de Morne-à-l'Eau 2–1 on aggregate (stage 3 of 6)

- CONCACAF Cup Winners Cup: 1 appearance

1993 – North/Caribbean Play-off
