= Essor-Préchotain =

- Full name: Essor-Préchotain
- Ground: Stade Albert Joyau; Le Prêcheur, Martinique
- Chairman: Christophe Marie-Rose
- Manager: Patrick Cavelan
- League: Martinique Championnat National

Essor-Préchotain is a professional football club of Martinique, based in the northwestern town Le Prêcheur.

They play in the Martinique's first division, the Martinique Championnat National.
