= Good Luck de Fort-de-France =

Good Luck
- Full name: Good Luck de Fort-de-France
- Ground: Stade Dillon
- Capacity: 9,300
- Chairman: Frantz Charles-Hélène
- Manager: Alain Jean
- League: Martinique Championnat National

Good Luck de Fort-de-France is a professional football club of Martinique, playing in the town of Fort-de-France.

They play in the Martinique's first division, the Martinique Championnat National.

== Honors ==
=== Domestic ===
- Martinique Championnat National (2): 1945, 1957.
- Coupe de la Martinique (4): 1956, 1973, 1974, 1979.

== Coupe de France ==
- Coupe de France: 1 appearance

1978–79
