= AS Samaritaine =

- Full name: Association Sportive Samaritaine
- Founded: 1920
- Ground: Stade Xercès-Louis à l'Union, Ste.-Marie, Martinique
- Chairman: Joseph Péraste
- Manager: Louis Percin
- League: Martinique Championnat National
- 2025–26: 5th

AS Samaritaine is a professional football club of Martinique, based in the northeastern town Sainte-Marie.

Founded in 1920, their home games are staged at their Xercès-Louis stadium, which is named after a Martinique-born French international footballer of the 1950s, Xercès Louis.

In 2009, the club were relegated due to financial problems. The club eventually won promotion back to the top division and are the current league champions, having won the title during the 2019–20 season.

== Honors ==
=== Domestic ===
- Martinique Championnat National (3): 1974–75, 1980–81, 2019–20.
- Coupe de Martinique (1): 2017.
- Trophée du Conseil Général (2): 2000, 2020.
- Ligue des Antilles (1): 2009.
