= Golden Star de Fort-de-France =

French football club in Martinique

Golden Star
- Full name: Golden Star de Fort-de-France
- Founded: 1895; 131 years ago
- Ground: Stade Serge Rouch, Fort-de-France, Martinique
- Chairman: Marceau Jobello
- Manager: David Guillet
- League: Martinique Championnat National
- 2025–26: 9th

Golden Star de Fort-de-France is a professional football club based in Fort-de-France, Martinique. The club plays in the Martinique Championnat National, and plays its home matches at Stade Serge Rouch. In 1974, Golden Star was the first overseas club to win a game in the Coupe de France, after defeating US Melun 2–1.

== Honors ==
=== Domestic ===
- Martinique Championnat National (16): 1927, 1928, 1929, 1936, 1937, 1939, 1948, 1952, 1953, 1954, 1956, 1958, 1959, 1962, 1976, 1986
- Coupe de la Martinique (5): 1953, 1957, 1958, 1963, 1970
- Ligue des Antilles (3): 1956, 1958, 1959

== Performance in CONCACAF competitions ==
- CONCACAF Champions' Cup: 2 appearances

1985 – Unknown round (Caribbean) – they passed the first round
1987 – Second round (Caribbean) – Lost against (Trinidad and Tobago) Trintoc FC 1 – 0 on aggregate (stage 2 of 4)

== The club in the French football structure ==
- French Cup: 3 appearances

1974/75, 1975/76, 1997/98

Ties won:

1974/75 Golden Star 1–1, 2–1 US Melun (rd 7)
