= CS Case-Pilote =

Football club of Martinique

- Full name: Club Sportif Case-Pilote
- Founded: 1937
- Ground: Stade Omer-Kromwell, Case-Pilote, Martinique
- Capacity: 1,000
- Chairman: Louis-Joseph Dogué
- Manager: Jean-Marc Civault
- League: Martinique Championnat National

Club Sportif Case-Pilote is a professional football based in Case-Pilote, Martinique. The club plays in the Martinique Championnat National, and plays its home matches at Stade Omer-Kromwell.

== Honors ==
=== Domestic ===
- Coupe de la Martinique (3): 1977, 2006, 2010.

== The club in the French football structure ==
- French Cup: 1 appearance

2001/02
