= Aiglon du Lamentin FC =

Association football club in Martinique

Aiglon du Lamentin
- Full name: Aiglon du Lamentin Football Club
- Founded: 1935
- Ground: Stade Georges Gratiant, Lamentin, Martinique
- Capacity: 8,500
- Chairman: Louison Sibado
- Manager: Luis Armelo Garcia
- League: Martinique Championnat National
- 2025–26: 12th
- Website: www.aiglondulamentinfootball.com

Aiglon du Lamentin Football Club is a professional football club based in Lamentin, Martinique. The club plays in the Martinique Championnat National, and plays its home matches at Stade Georges Gratiant.

== Honors ==
=== Domestic ===
- Martinique Championnat National (4): 1984, 1991, 1992, 1998
- Coupe de la Martinique (3): 1995, 1996, 2009
- Trophée du Conseil Général (1): 1998

== Performance in French Cup ==
- 1965–66 – Sixth round (lost away against US Quevilly 3 – 0)
- 1991–92 – Eighth round (lost away against Ajaccio GFCO CF2 4 – 0)
- 2004–05 – Seventh round (lost at home against Dunkerque CFA 4 – 0)
- 2006–07 – Seventh round (lost at home against JA Armentières CFA 2 – 0)
- 2018–19 – Round of 64 (lost away against US Orléans 3 –2 AET)

== Performance in international competitions ==
- CFU Club Championship (1 appearance)
  - 1998 – Semifinals
    Lost against (Trinidad and Tobago) Caledonia AIA 4–3 on aggregate
- CONCACAF Champions Cup (3 appearances)
  - 1985 – Unknown result
  - 1993 – Final (Caribbean Zone)
    Lost against (Suriname) SV Robinhood 3–2 on aggregate
  - 1992 – Semifinals
    Lost against (Costa Rica) LD Alajuelense 2–1
