= RC Rivière-Pilote =

Multi-sports club, based in Martinique

- Full name: Racing Club Rivière-Pilote
- Founded: 1961; 65 years ago
- Ground: Stade En Camée; Rivière-Pilote, Martinique
- Capacity: 3,000
- Chairman: Marcel Pujar
- Manager: Géralbert Guitteaud
- League: Martinique Championnat National

Racing-Club de Revière-Pilote (RC Rivière-Pilote) is a multi-sports club from Rivière-Pilote, Martinique.

RC Rivière-Pilote participates in football, handball, basketball, and athletics.

However, the most prominent sport of the club is football. RC Rivière-Pilote is considered as one of the more influential football clubs in Martinique.

Founded in 1961, the main football team of RC Rivière-Pilote has been playing in Division d'Honneur since 1974. The Martinican politician, Alfred Marie-Jeanne was the president of RC Rivière Pilote for 23 years, from 1967 to 1990.

The current president of the club is Marcel Pujar.

== Stadiums ==
For their matches, RC Rivière-Pilote plays in Stade Alfred Marie-Jeanne (formerly known as Stade En Camée) which has a capacity of 3,000. The club trains in Stade du bourg.

== Honors ==
=== Domestic ===
- Martinique Championnat National (5): 1982, 1983, 2008, 2010, 2012.
- Coupe de la Martinique (4): 1978, 1981, 2011, 2013.
- Trophée du Conseil Général (1): 2012.
- Ligue des Antilles (1): 2006.

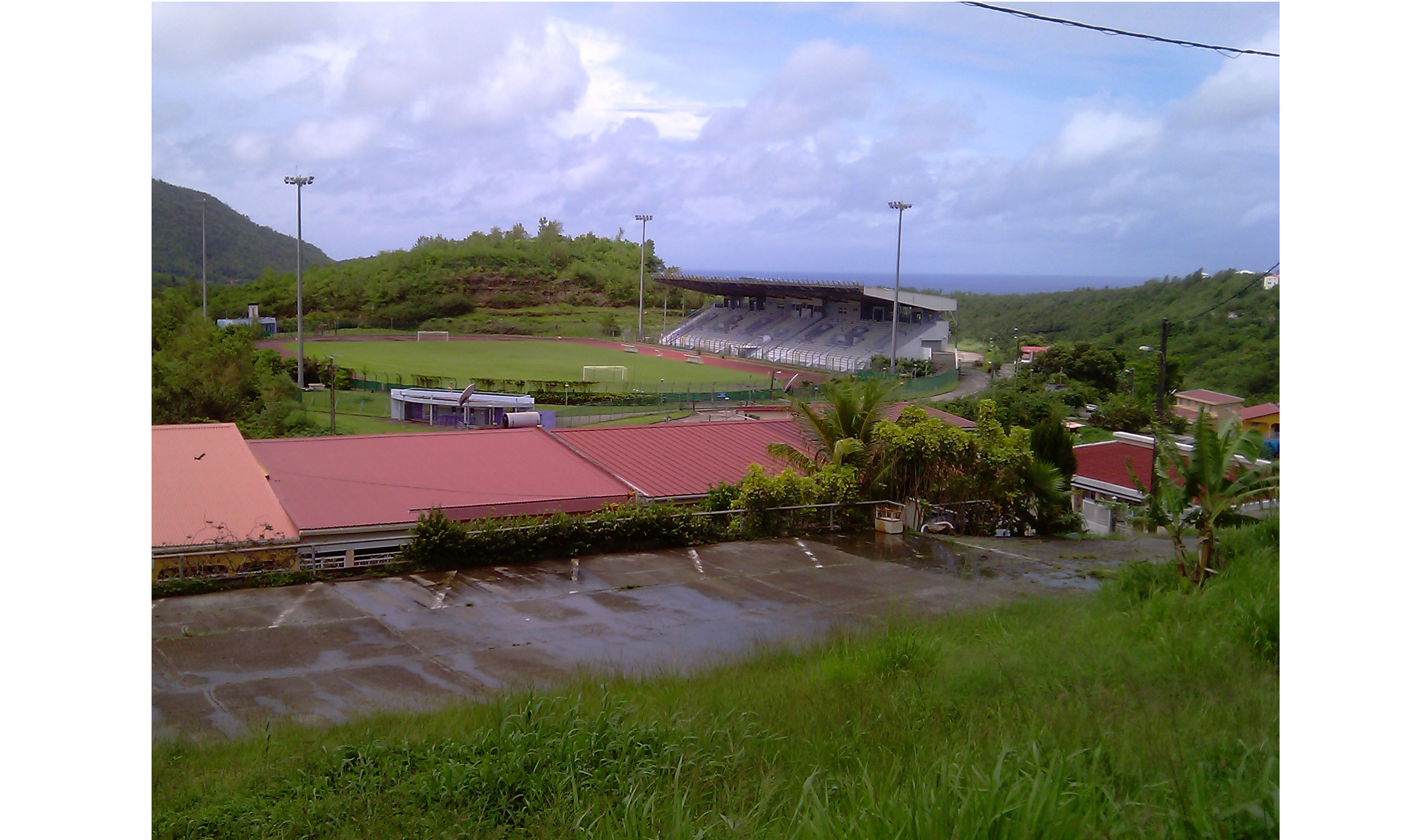
Municipal stadium in Rivière-Pilote

== Performance in CONCACAF competitions ==
- CONCACAF Champions' Cup: 2 appearances

1984 – unknown results
1989 – Third Round (Caribbean Zone) – Lost against (Cuba) FC Pinar del Río 3–2 on aggregate (stage 4 of 5)

== The club in the French football structure ==
- French Cup: 2 appearances

1977/78, 1981/82
