= Club Colonial =

Association football club in Martinique

- Full name: Club Colonial de Fort-de-France
- Founded: 1906; 120 years ago
- Ground: Stade Pierre-Aliker
- Capacity: 16,300
- Manager: Maurice Narcisse
- League: Martinique Championnat National
- 2025–26: 4th

Club Colonial de Fort-de-France is a professional football club based in Fort-de-France, Martinique. The club plays in the Martinique Championnat National, and plays its home matches at Stade Pierre-Aliker.

== Honors ==
=== Domestic ===
- Martinique Championnat National (19): 1920, 1921, 1922, 1923, 1924, 1926, 1930, 1931, 1935, 1938, 1940, 1941, 1942, 1943, 1949, 1964, 1965, 1971–72, 2010–11.
- Coupe de la Martinique (5): 1955, 1959, 1962, 1980, 2014.
- Trophée du Conseil Général (3): 2011, 2013, 2014.
- Ligue des Antilles (1): 2012

=== Friendly ===
- Coupe Radio Caraïbes (1): 1979–80

== The club in the French football structure ==
- French Cup: 5 appearances

1963–64, 1979–80, 1983–84, 2012–13, 2017–18

== Presidents (1906–present) ==
- Siron Pélière-Donatien
- Pierre Joseph-Noël
- Simon Pierre
- Ferriez Elizabeth (1938–76)
- Yvon Alpha (1976–01)
- Charles Ho Hio Hen (2001–)
