= Golden Lion FC =

Golden Lion
- Full name: Golden Lion Football Club
- Founded: 1947
- Ground: Stade Henri Murano, Saint-Joseph, Martinique
- Chairman: Jérôme Celinne
- Manager: Gustave Herelle
- League: Martinique Division d'Honneur
- 2025–26: 3rd
Home colours	Away colours

Golden Lion Football Club is a professional football club based in Saint-Joseph, Martinique. The club plays in the Martinique Championnat National, and plays its home matches at Stade Henri Murano. Golden Lion won the league for the first time in the 2014–15 season.

In January 2024, the club competed in the Coupe de France; losing to Lille OSC 12–0.

== Honors ==
=== Domestic ===
- Martinique Championnat National (4): 2014–15, 2015–16, 2020–21, 2021–22.
- Coupe de la Martinique (2): 2015–16, 2018–19.
- Trophée du Conseil Général (2): 2015, 2016.

=== International ===
- CONCACAF Caribbean Club Shield
  - Runners-up (1): 2023.

== Historic goalscorer ==
Kevin Parsemain
Detail	Championnat national	Caribbean shield	Caribbean Cup	Coupe VYV	France Cup	Total
Goals	163	11	1	1	1	177
Scorer	3	1				4
