= 2018–19 Coupe de France preliminary rounds, overseas departments and territories =

The 2018–19 Coupe de France preliminary rounds, overseas departments and territories, make up the qualifying competition to decide which teams from the French overseas departments and territories take part in the main competition from the seventh round.

== Mayotte ==
=== First round ===
These matches were played on 18 April 2018.

First round results: Mayotte
Tie no	Home team (tier)	Score	Away team (tier)
1.	(Mayotte) ASJ Moinatrindri (R3)	2–2 (4–3 p)	FC Sud (R3) (Mayotte)
2.	(Mayotte) Olympique de Miréréni (R2)	1–1 (4–3 p)	FC Labattoir (R2)AS Neige (R2) (Mayotte)
3.	(Mayotte) AOE Chiconi (R3)	0–3	Racine du Nord (R2) (Mayotte)
4.	(Mayotte) US Bandrélé (R3)	5–1	RC Barakani (R3) (Mayotte)
5.	(Mayotte) ASJ Handréma (R2)	0–2	USC Labattoir (R3) (Mayotte)
6.	(Mayotte) USC Kangani (R3)	1–0	Feu du Centre (R3) (Mayotte)
7.	(Mayotte) AS Neige (R2)	0–0 (3–5 p)	FC Dembeni (R2) (Mayotte)
8.	Enfants de Mayotte (R2)	3–2	US Ouangani (R2) (Mayotte)
9.	(Mayotte) USCJ Koungou (R2)	6–2	US Kavani (R3) (Mayotte)
10.	(Mayotte) Enfant du Port (R3)	2–1	AJ Mtsahara (R3) (Mayotte)
11.	(Mayotte) AJ Kani-Kéli (R3)	1–4	AS Defense de Kawéni (R3) (Mayotte)
12.	(Mayotte) VCO Vahibé (R2)	1–1 (5–6 p)	CJ Mronabeja (R3) (Mayotte)
13.	(Mayotte) USC Anteou Poroani (R2)	4–0	FC Chiconi (R3) (Mayotte)
14.	(Mayotte) RC Tsimkoura (R3)	0–2	Mahabou SC (R3) (Mayotte)
15.	(Mayotte) AS Bandraboua (R3)	4–0	Maharavou Sport (R3) (Mayotte)

Note: Mayotte League structure (no promotion to French League structure):
Régionale 1 (R1)
Régionale 2 (R2)
Régionale 3 (R3)

=== Second round ===
These matches were played on 11 and 22 August 2018.

Third round results: Mayotte
Tie no	Home team (tier)	Score	Away team (tier)
1.	(Mayotte) FC Koropa (R1)	1–0	Etincelles Hamjago (R1) (Mayotte)
2.	(Mayotte) AS Jumeaux de M'zouazia (R1)	2–1	Olympique de Miréréni (R2) (Mayotte)
3.	(Mayotte) AS Bandraboua (R3)	2–1	UCS Sada (R1) (Mayotte)
4.	(Mayotte) FC Sohoa (R1)	0–1	AS Sada (R1) (Mayotte)
5.	(Mayotte) Foudre 2000 (R1)	4–1	FC Dembeni (R2) (Mayotte)
6.	(Mayotte) CJ Mronabeja (R3)	0–5	FC Mtsapéré (R1) (Mayotte)
7.	(Mayotte) Mahabou SC (R3)	0–1	ASC Abeilles (R1) (Mayotte)
8.	(Mayotte) AS Defense de Kawéni (R3)	0–1	Diables Noirs (R1) (Mayotte)

Note: Mayotte League structure (no promotion to French League structure):
Régionale 1 (R1)
Régionale 2 (R2)
Régionale 3 (R3)

=== Third round ===
These matches were played on 11 and 22 August 2018.

Third round results: Mayotte
Tie no	Home team (tier)	Score	Away team (tier)
1.	(Mayotte) FC Koropa (R1)	1–0	Etincelles Hamjago (R1) (Mayotte)
2.	(Mayotte) AS Jumeaux de M'zouazia (R1)	2–1	Olympique de Miréréni (R2) (Mayotte)
3.	(Mayotte) AS Bandraboua (R3)	2–1	UCS Sada (R1) (Mayotte)
4.	(Mayotte) FC Sohoa (R1)	0–1	AS Sada (R1) (Mayotte)
5.	(Mayotte) Foudre 2000 (R1)	4–1	FC Dembeni (R2) (Mayotte)
6.	(Mayotte) CJ Mronabeja (R3)	0–5	FC Mtsapéré (R1) (Mayotte)
7.	(Mayotte) Mahabou SC (R3)	0–1	ASC Abeilles (R1) (Mayotte)
8.	(Mayotte) AS Defense de Kawéni (R3)	0–1	Diables Noirs (R1) (Mayotte)

Note: Mayotte League structure (no promotion to French League structure):
Régionale 1 (R1)
Régionale 2 (R2)
Régionale 3 (R3)

=== Fourth round ===
These matches were played on 1 September 2018.

Fourth round results: Mayotte
Tie no	Home team (tier)	Score	Away team (tier)
1.	(Mayotte) Diables Noirs (R1)	2–1	FC Koropa (R1) (Mayotte)
2.	(Mayotte) FC Mtsapéré (R1)	2–1	AS Jumeaux de M'zouazia (R1) (Mayotte)
3.	(Mayotte) ASC Abeilles (R1)	1–2 (a.e.t.)	AS Sada (R1) (Mayotte)
4.	(Mayotte) AS Bandraboua (R3)	2–2 (3–2 p)	Foudre 2000 (R1) (Mayotte)

Note: Mayotte League structure (no promotion to French League structure):
Régionale 1 (R1)
Régionale 2 (R2)
Régionale 3 (R3)

=== Fifth round ===
These matches were played on 22 September 2018.

Fifth round results: Mayotte
Tie no	Home team (tier)	Score	Away team (tier)
1.	(Mayotte) AS Sada (R1)	1–6	Diables Noirs (R1) (Mayotte)
2.	(Mayotte) AS Bandraboua (R3)	0–3	FC Mtsapéré (R1) (Mayotte)

Note: Mayotte League structure (no promotion to French League structure):
Régionale 1 (R1)
Régionale 2 (R2)
Régionale 3 (R3)

=== Sixth round ===
This match was played on 13 October 2018.

Sixth round results: Mayotte
Tie no	Home team (tier)	Score	Away team (tier)
1.	(Mayotte) Diables Noirs (R1)	0–2	FC Mtsapéré (R1) (Mayotte)

Note: Mayotte League structure (no promotion to French League structure):
Régionale 1 (R1)
Régionale 2 (R2)
Régionale 3 (R3)

== French Guiana ==
=== Third round ===
This season, the preliminary rounds start with the third round, due to the number of teams entered. These matches were played on 24, 25, 26 and 29 August 2018.

Third round results: French Guiana
Tie no	Home team (tier)	Score	Away team (tier)
1.	(French Guiana) CSC Cayenne (R1)	1–4	US de Matoury (R1) (French Guiana)
2.	(French Guiana) Dynamo De Soula (R2)	1–2	US Sinnamary (R1) (French Guiana)
3.	(French Guiana) Kourou FC (R1)	2–2 (3–2 p)	ASC Karib (R2) (French Guiana)
4.	(French Guiana) EJ Balate (R2)	0–7	ASU Grand Santi (R1) (French Guiana)
5.	(French Guiana) ASC Agouado (R1)	3–0 (Note: Tie won by forfeit.)	AOJ Mana (R2) (French Guiana)
6.	(French Guiana) ASE Matoury (R1)	3–0	ASC Jeunes Originaires du Brésil (R2) (French Guiana)
7.	(French Guiana) US St Élie (R2)	0–6	USC De Roura (R2) (French Guiana)
8.	(French Guiana) AJ Saint-Georges (R1)	3–4	SC Kouroucien (R2) (French Guiana)
9.	(French Guiana) USL Montjoly (R2)	3–3 (4–3 p)	FC Oyapock (R1) (French Guiana)
10.	(French Guiana) AJ Balata Abriba (R2)	0–5	USC Montsinery (R2) (French Guiana)
11.	(French Guiana) ASC Kawina (none)	0–3	Olympique Cayenne (R2) (French Guiana)
12.	(French Guiana) US Macouria (R2)	2–4	ASC Ouest (R1) (French Guiana)
13.	(French Guiana) ASC Rémire (R1)	3–0	Le Geldar De Kourou (R1) (French Guiana)

Note: French Guiana League structure (no promotion to French League structure):

Regional 1 (R1)

Regional 2 (R2)

=== Fourth round ===
These matches were played on 15, 16 and 18 September 2018.

Fourth round results: French Guiana
Tie no	Home team (tier)	Score	Away team (tier)
1.	(French Guiana) USC De Roura (R2)	0–3 (Note: USC De Roura penalised for fielding a U17 player without appropriate registration clearance. USL Montjoly qualify. Original scoreline 2–0.)	USL Montjoly (R2) (French Guiana)
2.	(French Guiana) ASC Agouado (R1)	1–0	USC Montsinery (R2) (French Guiana)
3.	(French Guiana) ASC Rémire (R1)	1–2	US Sinnamary (R1) (French Guiana)
4.	(French Guiana) ASE Matoury (R1)	7–0	ASL Sport Guyanais (R2) (French Guiana)
5.	(French Guiana) Kourou FC (R1)	0–0 (4–3 p)	ASC Ouest (R1) (French Guiana)
6.	(French Guiana) ASU Grand Santi (R1)	3–2	ASCS Maripasoula (none) (French Guiana)
7.	(French Guiana) SC Kouroucien (R2)	4–2	EF Iracoubo (R2) (French Guiana)
8.	(French Guiana) US de Matoury (R1)	1–0	Olympique Cayenne (R2) (French Guiana)

Note: French Guiana League structure (no promotion to French League structure):

Regional 1 (R1)

Regional 2 (R2)

=== Fifth round ===
These matches were played on 29 and 30 September 2018.

Fifth round results: French Guiana
Tie no	Home team (tier)	Score	Away team (tier)
1.	(French Guiana) US Sinnamary (R1)	1–1 (4–2 p)	ASU Grand Santi (R1) (French Guiana)
2.	(French Guiana) ASC Agouado (R1)	1–0	Kourou FC (R1) (French Guiana)
3.	(French Guiana) USL Montjoly (R2)	0–6	ASE Matoury (R1) (French Guiana)
4.	(French Guiana) SC Kouroucien (R2)	2–4	US de Matoury (R1) (French Guiana)

Note: French Guiana League structure (no promotion to French League structure):

Regional 1 (R1)

Regional 2 (R2)

=== Sixth round ===
These matches were played on 21 October 2018.

Sixth round results: French Guiana
Tie no	Home team (tier)	Score	Away team (tier)
1.	(French Guiana) ASC Agouado (R1)	1–2	ASE Matoury (R1) (French Guiana)
2.	(French Guiana) US Sinnamary (R1)	3–4	US de Matoury (R1) (French Guiana)

Note: French Guiana League structure (no promotion to French League structure):

Regional 1 (R1)

Regional 2 (R2)

== Guadeloupe ==
=== Second round ===
This season, the preliminary rounds start with the second round, due to the number of clubs entering. These matches were played on 22, 24, 25 and 26 August 2018.

Second round results: Guadeloupe
Tie no	Home team (tier)	Score	Away team (tier)
1.	(Guadeloupe) AS Nenuphars (R2)	1–0 (a.e.t.)	Evolucas Lamentin (R2) (Guadeloupe)
2.	(Guadeloupe) CA Marquisat (R3)	0–1	Dynamo Le Moule (R2) (Guadeloupe)
3.	(Guadeloupe) SC Baie-Mahault (R2)	1–2	Rapid Club (R2) (Guadeloupe)
4.	(Guadeloupe) AC St Robert (R3)	0–9	CS Capesterre-Belle-Eau (R2) (Guadeloupe)
5.	(Guadeloupe) ASC La Frégate (R2)	3–5 (a.e.t.)	CS St François (R2) (Guadeloupe)
6.	(Guadeloupe) JSC Marie Galante (R3)	3–0 (Note: Tie won by forfeit.)	JTR Trois Rivières (R2) (Guadeloupe)
7.	(Guadeloupe) JS Vieux-Habitants (R2)	2–0	ASG Juventus de Sainte-Anne (R2) (Guadeloupe)
8.	(Guadeloupe) Cactus Ste Anne (R2)	1–2	CS Bouillantais (R2) (Guadeloupe)
9.	(Guadeloupe) Association Juvenis (R2)	1–0	US Cambrefort (R3) (Guadeloupe)
10.	(Guadeloupe) L'Éclair de Petit-Bourg (R3)	3–0	Alliance FC (R3) (Guadeloupe)
11.	(Guadeloupe) AS Juventa (R3)	1–3	AO Gourbeyrienne (R2) (Guadeloupe)
12.	(Guadeloupe) St Claude FC (R2)	1–2	Jeunesse Evolution (R2) (Guadeloupe)
13.	(Guadeloupe) Étoile de l'Ouest (R3)	0–5	JS Abymienne (R2) (Guadeloupe)

Note: Guadeloupe League structure (no promotion to French League structure):

Ligue Régionale 1 (R1)

Ligue Régionale 2 (R2)

Ligue Régionale 3 (R3)

=== Third round ===
These matches were played on 31 August and 1,2 and 5 September 2018.

Third round results: Guadeloupe
Tie no	Home team (tier)	Score	Away team (tier)
1.	(Guadeloupe) AS Nenuphars (R2)	1–2 (a.e.t.)	Phare du Canal (R1) (Guadeloupe)
2.	(Guadeloupe) Solidarité-Scolaire (R1)	3–0	CS Capesterre-Belle-Eau (R2) (Guadeloupe)
3.	(Guadeloupe) ASC Madiana (R2)	1–3	JS Vieux-Habitants (R2) (Guadeloupe)
4.	(Guadeloupe) CS St François (R2)	2–2 (4–2 p)	JSC Marie Galante (R3) (Guadeloupe)
5.	(Guadeloupe) CS Moulien (R1)	1–0	La Gauloise de Basse-Terre (R1) (Guadeloupe)
6.	(Guadeloupe) Dynamo Le Moule (R2)	1–2	Amical Club Marie Galante (R1) (Guadeloupe)
7.	(Guadeloupe) ASC Siroco Les Abymes (R1)	1–2	L'Etoile de Morne-à-l'Eau (R1) (Guadeloupe)
8.	(Guadeloupe) AS Le Moule (R2)	4–3	Rapid Club (R2) (Guadeloupe)
9.	(Guadeloupe) USC de Bananier (R2)	3–1	Association Juvenis (R2) (Guadeloupe)
10.	(Guadeloupe) AO Gourbeyrienne (R2)	2–6	AS Le Gosier (R1) (Guadeloupe)
11.	(Guadeloupe) Jeunesse Evolution (R2)	1–2	JS Abymienne (R2) (Guadeloupe)
12.	(Guadeloupe) Arsenal Club (R1)	2–2 (3–4 p)	Stade Lamentinois (R1) (Guadeloupe)
13.	(Guadeloupe) US Baie-Mahault (R1)	0–1	Racing Club de Basse-Terre (R2) (Guadeloupe)
14.	(Guadeloupe) CS Bouillantais (R2)	2–3 (a.e.t.)	Union des Artistes de Raizet (R1) (Guadeloupe)
15.	(Guadeloupe) L'Éclair de Petit-Bourg (R3)	0–8	Unité Ste Rosienne (R1) (Guadeloupe)
16.	(Guadeloupe) US Grande Bourgeoise (R2)	1–1 (5–4 p)	Red Star (R1) (Guadeloupe)

Note: Guadeloupe League structure (no promotion to French League structure):

Ligue Régionale 1 (R1)

Ligue Régionale 2 (R2)

Ligue Régionale 3 (R3)

=== Fourth round ===
These matches were played on 2 and 3 October 2018.

Fourth round results: Guadeloupe
Tie no	Home team (tier)	Score	Away team (tier)
1.	(Guadeloupe) Phare du Canal (R1)	5–1	CS St François (R2) (Guadeloupe)
2.	(Guadeloupe) AS Le Moule (R2)	1–2	CS Moulien (R1) (Guadeloupe)
3.	(Guadeloupe) JS Vieux-Habitants (R2)	4–0	Solidarité-Scolaire (R1) (Guadeloupe)
4.	(Guadeloupe) Amical Club Marie Galante (R1)	2–3 (a.e.t.)	L'Etoile de Morne-à-l'Eau (R1) (Guadeloupe)
5.	(Guadeloupe) AS Le Gosier (R1)	1–0	Racing Club de Basse-Terre (R2) (Guadeloupe)
6.	(Guadeloupe) Unité Ste Rosienne (R1)	4–2	JS Abymienne (R2) (Guadeloupe)
7.	(Guadeloupe) US Grande Bourgeoise (R2)	0–2	Union des Artistes de Raizet (R1) (Guadeloupe)
8.	(Guadeloupe) Stade Lamentinois (R1)	1–0	USC de Bananier (R2) (Guadeloupe)

Note: Guadeloupe League structure (no promotion to French League structure):

Ligue Régionale 1 (R1)

Ligue Régionale 2 (R2)

Ligue Régionale 3 (R3)

=== Fifth round ===
These matches were played on 19 and 20 October 2018.

Fifth round results: Guadeloupe
Tie no	Home team (tier)	Score	Away team (tier)
1.	(Guadeloupe) Phare du Canal (R1)	1–2	CS Moulien (R1) (Guadeloupe)
2.	(Guadeloupe) JS Vieux-Habitants (R2)	2–0	L'Etoile de Morne-à-l'Eau (R1) (Guadeloupe)
3.	(Guadeloupe) Union des Artistes de Raizet (R1)	0–4	Unité Ste Rosienne (R1) (Guadeloupe)
4.	(Guadeloupe) AS Le Gosier (R1)	2–0	Stade Lamentinois (R1) (Guadeloupe)

Note: Guadeloupe League structure (no promotion to French League structure):

Ligue Régionale 1 (R1)

Ligue Régionale 2 (R2)

Ligue Régionale 3 (R3)

=== Sixth round ===
These matches were played on 23 and 24 October 2018.

Sixth round results: Guadeloupe
Tie no	Home team (tier)	Score	Away team (tier)
1.	(Guadeloupe) CS Moulien (R1)	1–2 (a.e.t.)	JS Vieux-Habitants (R2) (Guadeloupe)
2.	(Guadeloupe) Unité Ste Rosienne (R1)	5–3 (a.e.t.)	AS Le Gosier (R1) (Guadeloupe)

Note: Guadeloupe League structure (no promotion to French League structure):

Ligue Régionale 1 (R1)

Ligue Régionale 2 (R2)

Ligue Régionale 3 (R3)

== Réunion ==
=== Second round ===
This season, the preliminary rounds start with the second round, referred to locally as the first round of the regional competition, due to the number of participants requiring fewer rounds than other regions.

These matches were played on 21 and 22 April and 2 May 2018.

Second round results: Réunion
Tie no	Home team (tier)	Score	Away team (tier)
1.	(Réunion) Saint Denis EDFA (R2)	3–3 (3–1 p)	SS Rivière Sport (R2) (Réunion)
2.	(Réunion) CO St Pierre (R2)	1–0	AFC Saint Laurent (R2) (Réunion)
3.	(Réunion) AS Bretagne (R2)	7–1	AS Saint Philippe (R2) (Réunion)
4.	(Réunion) AS Etoile du Sud (R2)	1–0	FC Bagatelle Sainte-Suzanne (R2) (Réunion)
5.	(Réunion) Trois Bassins FC (R2)	1–0	FC Panonnais (R2) (Réunion)
6.	(Réunion) FC Parfin Saint-Andre (R2)	3–1	ACF Saint-Leusien (R2) (Réunion)

Note: Reúnion League structure (no promotion to French League structure):
Régionale 1 (R1)
Régionale 2 (R2)
D2 Départemental (D2D)

=== Third round ===
These matches were played on 12 and 13 May 2018.

Third round results: Réunion
Tie no	Home team (tier)	Score	Away team (tier)
1.	(Réunion) AF Saint-Louisien (R1)	4–0	AEFC Etang Saint-Leu (R2) (Réunion)
2.	(Réunion) FC Parfin Saint-André (R2)	3–2	AJS Bois d'Olives (R2) (Réunion)
3.	(Réunion) SS Jeanne d'Arc (R1)	5–0	US Bellemène Canot (R2) (Réunion)
4.	(Réunion) JS Saint-Pierroise (R1)	7–0	JS Bras Creux (R2) (Réunion)
5.	(Réunion) AS Saint-Louisienne (R1)	4–0	AJS de l'Ouest (R2) (Réunion)
6.	(Réunion) Saint-Pauloise FC (R1)	2–0	Union Saint-Benoît (R2) (Réunion)
7.	(Réunion) US Sainte-Marienne (R1)	6–0	AS Etoile du Sud (R2) (Réunion)
8.	(Réunion) OC St André les Léopards (R1)	4–2	FC Ligne Paradis (R2) (Réunion)
9.	(Réunion) AS Excelsior (R1)	17–1	Cilaos FC (R2) (Réunion)
10.	(Réunion) Saint-Denis FC (R1)	3–1 (a.e.t.)	FC Plaine des Grègues (R2) (Réunion)
11.	(Réunion) AS Capricorne (R1)	1–0	CO St Pierre (R2) (Réunion)
12.	(Réunion) Trois Bassins FC (R2)	0–0 (4–5 p)	Saint Denis EDFA (R2) (Réunion)
13.	(Réunion) La Tamponnaise (R1)	4–0	AJS Saint-Denis (R2) (Réunion)
14.	(Réunion) AS Sainte-Suzanne (R1)	2–1 (a.e.t.)	ASC Grands Bois (R2) (Réunion)
15.	(Réunion) AJ Petite-Île (R1)	2–0	AS Évêché (R2) (Réunion)
16.	(Réunion) AS Marsouins (R1)	1–1 (5–4 p)	AS Bretagne (R2) (Réunion)

Note: Reúnion League structure (no promotion to French League structure):
Régionale 1 (R1)
Régionale 2 (R2)
D2 Départemental (D2D)

=== Fourth round ===
These matches were played on 2 and 3 June 2018.

Fourth round results: Réunion
Tie no	Home team (tier)	Score	Away team (tier)
1.	(Réunion) JS Saint-Pierroise (R1)	6–1	FC Parfin Saint-André (R2) (Réunion)
2.	(Réunion) Saint-Pauloise FC (R1)	4–0 (Note: AS Saint-Louisienne penalised for fielding a suspended player. Saint-Pauloise FC qualify. Original scoreline 1–2.)	AS Saint-Louisienne (R1) (Réunion)
3.	(Réunion) US Sainte-Marienne (R1)	3–2 (a.e.t.)	OC St André les Léopards (R1) (Réunion)
4.	(Réunion) SS Jeanne d'Arc (R1)	1–0	AF Saint-Louisien (R1) (Réunion)
5.	(Réunion) AS Sainte-Suzanne (R1)	2–1 (a.e.t.)	AS Capricorne (R1) (Réunion)
6.	(Réunion) Saint-Denis FC (R1)	1–0	AJ Petite-Île (R1) (Réunion)
7.	(Réunion) AS Excelsior (R1)	2–0	Saint Denis EDFA (R2) (Réunion)
8.	(Réunion) La Tamponnaise (R1)	2–0	AS Marsouins (R1) (Réunion)

Note: Reúnion League structure (no promotion to French League structure):
Régionale 1 (R1)
Régionale 2 (R2)
D2 Départemental (D2D)

=== Fifth round ===
These matches were played on 21, 22, 23 and 25 September 2018.

Fifth round results: Réunion
Tie no	Home team (tier)	Score	Away team (tier)
1.	(Réunion) JS Saint-Pierroise (R1)	2–0	US Sainte-Marienne (R1) (Réunion)
2.	(Réunion) SS Jeanne d'Arc (R1)	2–1 (a.e.t.)	Saint-Pauloise FC (R1) (Réunion)
3.	(Réunion) La Tamponnaise (R1)	2–0	Saint-Denis FC (R1) (Réunion)
4.	(Réunion) AS Excelsior (R1)	0–1	AS Sainte-Suzanne (R1) (Réunion)

Note: Reúnion League structure (no promotion to French League structure):
Régionale 1 (R1)
Régionale 2 (R2)
D2 Départemental (D2D)

=== Sixth round ===
These were played on 27 and 28 October 2018.

Sixth round results: Réunion
Tie no	Home team (tier)	Score	Away team (tier)
1.	(Réunion) JS Saint-Pierroise (R1)	0–1	SS Jeanne d'Arc (R1) (Réunion)
2.	(Réunion) La Tamponnaise (R1)	0–0 (2–4 p)	AS Sainte-Suzanne (R1) (Réunion)

Note: Reúnion League structure (no promotion to French League structure):
Régionale 1 (R1)
Régionale 2 (R2)

== Martinique ==
=== Second round ===
This season, the preliminary rounds start with the second round, due to the number of clubs entered. These matches were played on 25 and 26 August 2018.

Second round results: Martinique
Tie no	Home team (tier)	Score	Away team (tier)
1.	(Martinique) Réal Tartane (R2)	1–3	Golden Star (R1) (Martinique)
2.	(Martinique) JS Eucalyptus (R2)	2–1	Stade Spiritain (R2) (Martinique)
3.	(Martinique) US Marinoise (R2)	1–0 (a.e.t.)	CS Vauclinois (R2) (Martinique)
4.	(Martinique) AS Excelsior (R3)	2–2 (4–2 p)	CS Bélimois (R3) (Martinique)
5.	(Martinique) FEP Monésie (R3)	0–3	Olympique Le Marin (R2) (Martinique)
6.	(Martinique) CSC Carbet (R3)	1–4	AC Vert-Pré (R2) (Martinique)
7.	(Martinique) AS Étoile Basse-Pointe (R2)	5–1	La Gauloise de Trinité (R3) (Martinique)
8.	(Martinique) SC Lamentin (R3)	1–5	RC St Joseph (R1) (Martinique)
9.	(Martinique) AS Silver Star (R3)	1–4	Assaut de St Pierre (R1) (Martinique)
10.	(Martinique) Good Luck (R2)	0–3	Essor-Préchotain (R1) (Martinique)
11.	(Martinique) Anses Arlets FC (R3)	0–3	US Riveraine (R3) (Martinique)
12.	(Martinique) UJ Monnérot (R2)	2–1 (a.e.t.)	Etendard Bellefontaine (R2) (Martinique)
13.	(Martinique) Oceanic Club (R2)	0–4	L'Intrépide Club (R3) (Martinique)
14.	(Martinique) ASC Eudorçait-Fourniols (R3)	0–10	Réveil Sportif (R2) (Martinique)
15.	(Martinique) US Diamantinoise (R2)	3–0 (Note: Tie won by forfeit.)	Gri-Gri Pilotin FC (R3) (Martinique)
16.	(Martinique) RC Lorrain (R1)	2–1	Étincelle Macouba (R2) (Martinique)
17.	(Martinique) AS Eclair Rivière-Salée (R2)	3–0	ASC Hirondelle (R3) (Martinique)
18.	(Martinique) Eveil les Trois-Îlets (R2)	3–0	Santana Club (R3) (Martinique)
19.	(Martinique) CO Trenelle (R2)	3–0	CS Case-Pilote (R2) (Martinique)
20.	(Martinique) AS New Club (R2)	3–0	Club Péléen (R2) (Martinique)
21.	(Martinique) ASC Môn Pito (R3)	3–0	JS Marigot (R3) (Martinique)
22.	(Martinique) UJ Redoute (R2)	1–1 (3–1 p)	CO Dillon-Ste Thérèse (R2) (Martinique)

Note: Martinique League structure (no promotion to French League structure):
Régionale 1 (R1)
Régionale 2 (R2)
Régionale 3 (R3)

=== Third round ===
These matches were played on 31 August, 1 and 2 September and 3 October 2018.

Third round results: Martinique
Tie no	Home team (tier)	Score	Away team (tier)
1.	(Martinique) AS New Club (R2)	2–1	US Diamantinoise (R2) (Martinique)
2.	(Martinique) Golden Star (R1)	2–2 (2–1 p)	UJ Monnérot (R2) (Martinique)
3.	(Martinique) AS Samaritaine (R1)	1–1 (3–0 p)	AS Eclair Rivière-Salée (R2) (Martinique)
4.	(Martinique) Aiglon du Lamentin (R1)	1–1 (3–1 p)	New Star Ducos (R1) (Martinique)
5.	(Martinique) Eveil les Trois-Îlets (R2)	3–0	AS Excelsior (R3) (Martinique)
6.	(Martinique) Assaut de St Pierre (R1)	2–0	AC Vert-Pré (R2) (Martinique)
7.	(Martinique) Club Franciscain (R1)	4–2 (a.e.t.)	Emulation (R1) (Martinique)
8.	(Martinique) US Marinoise (R2)	2–0	AS Étoile Basse-Pointe (R2) (Martinique)
9.	(Martinique) CO Trenelle (R2)	0–2	RC Rivière-Pilote (R1) (Martinique)
10.	(Martinique) US Robert (R1)	1–3	Golden Lion FC (R1) (Martinique)
11.	(Martinique) L'Intrépide Club (R3)	1–8	Essor-Préchotain (R1) (Martinique)
12.	(Martinique) US Riveraine (R3)	0–2	RC Lorrain (R1) (Martinique)
13.	(Martinique) Club Colonial (R1)	0–0 (5–6 p)	Réveil Sportif (R2) (Martinique)
14.	(Martinique) AS Morne-des-Esses (R2)	5–0	ASC Môn Pito (R3) (Martinique)
15.	(Martinique) Olympique Le Marin (R2)	1–5	RC St Joseph (R1) (Martinique)
16.	(Martinique) JS Eucalyptus (R2)	1–0	UJ Redoute (R2) (Martinique)

Note: Martinique League structure (no promotion to French League structure):
Régionale 1 (R1)
Régionale 2 (R2)
Régionale 3 (R3)

=== Fourth round ===
These matches were played on 25 and 26 September and 6 October 2018.

Fourth round results: Martinique
Tie no	Home team (tier)	Score	Away team (tier)
1.	(Martinique) AS Morne-des-Esses (R2)	2–0	AS New Club (R2) (Martinique)
2.	(Martinique) Réveil Sportif (R2)	1–2	AS Samaritaine (R1) (Martinique)
3.	(Martinique) RC Lorrain (R1)	1–0	Golden Star (R1) (Martinique)
4.	(Martinique) Golden Lion FC (R1)	4–1	Essor-Préchotain (R1) (Martinique)
5.	(Martinique) Eveil les Trois-Îlets (R2)	1–7	Club Franciscain (R1) (Martinique)
6.	(Martinique) JS Eucalyptus (R2)	2–4	Aiglon du Lamentin (R1) (Martinique)
7.	(Martinique) RC Rivière-Pilote (R1)	1–1 (4–2 p)	US Marinoise (R2) (Martinique)
8.	(Martinique) RC St Joseph (R1)	2–1	Assaut de St Pierre (R1) (Martinique)

Note: Martinique League structure (no promotion to French League structure):

Régionale 1 (R1)

Régionale 2 (R2)

Régionale 3 (R3)

=== Fifth round ===
These matches were played on 5, 6 and 12 October 2018.

Fifth round results: Martinique
Tie no	Home team (tier)	Score	Away team (tier)
1.	(Martinique) Aiglon du Lamentin (R1)	1–0	RC St Joseph (R1) (Martinique)
2.	(Martinique) AS Samaritaine (R1)	1–5	Golden Lion FC (R1) (Martinique)
3.	(Martinique) RC Lorrain (R1)	5–0	AS Morne-des-Esses (R2) (Martinique)
4.	(Martinique) Club Franciscain (R1)	0–1	RC Rivière-Pilote (R1) (Martinique)

Note: Martinique League structure (no promotion to French League structure):

Régionale 1 (R1)

Régionale 2 (R2)

Régionale 3 (R3)

=== Sixth round ===
These matches were played on 23 and 24 October 2018.

Sixth round results: Martinique
Tie no	Home team (tier)	Score	Away team (tier)
1.	(Martinique) RC Rivière-Pilote (R1)	0–1	Aiglon du Lamentin (R1) (Martinique)
2.	(Martinique) Golden Lion FC (R1)	3–1	RC Lorrain (R1) (Martinique)

Note: Martinique League structure (no promotion to French League structure):

Régionale 1 (R1)

Régionale 2 (R2)

Régionale 3 (R3)

== Saint Pierre and Miquelon ==
=== First round ===
The overseas collectivity of Saint Pierre and Miquelon has teams participating in the qualification rounds of the competition for the first time. With only three teams in the collectivity, there was just one first round match, with the third team receiving a bye to the second round.

The match was played on 24 June 2018.

First round results: Saint Pierre and Miquelon
Tie no	Home team (tier)	Score	Away team (tier)
1.	(Saint Pierre and Miquelon) A.S. Saint Pierraise	1–0	AS Miquelonnaise (Saint Pierre and Miquelon)

=== Second round ===
With only three teams in the collectivity, there was just one second round match, with the winner entered into the third round draw in the Bourgogne-Franche-Comté region.

The match was played on 4 July 2018.

Second round results: Saint Pierre and Miquelon
Tie no	Home team (tier)	Score	Away team (tier)
1.	(Saint Pierre and Miquelon) AS Îlienne Amateurs	0–0 (2–4 p)	A.S. Saint Pierraise (Saint Pierre and Miquelon)

== See also ==
- Overseas France teams in the main competition of the Coupe de France
