= 2019–20 Coupe de France preliminary rounds, overseas departments and territories =

The 2019–20 Coupe de France preliminary rounds, overseas departments and territories are the qualifying competitions to decide which teams from the leagues of the overseas departments and territories of France take part in the main competition from the seventh round. Separate qualifying competitions take place in Guadeloupe, French Guiana, Martinique, Mayotte, Réunion (including Saint Martin) and Saint Pierre and Miquelon. Two teams from each of the qualifying competitions of Guadeloupe, French Guiana, Martinique and Réunion are included in the seventh round draw, as is one team from the qualifying competition of Mayotte. The winning team from the Saint Pierre and Miquelon qualifying competition is placed into one of the mainland Regional qualifying competitions at the third round stage.

In 2018–19, Aiglon du Lamentin from Martinique were the longest surviving in the main competition, reaching the round of 64 before losing to Orléans after extra time.

== Mayotte ==
The draw was originally made on 14 February 2019, with a total of 48 clubs participating from Régionale 1, Régional 2 and Régionale 3 divisions. This draw was subsequently cancelled, and replaced on 20 February 2019 with an expanded draw involving 65 clubs, including teams from Régionale 4. To achieve this, a preliminary round with one match was required. Note that the Mayotte League continue to refer to this as the first round.

The second round draw was published on 19 April 2019, with 16 ties being drawn.

The third round draw was published on 4 June 2019, with 8 ties being drawn.

The fourth round draw was published on 16 July 2019, with 4 ties being drawn.

The fifth round draw was published on 16 August 2019, with 2 ties being drawn.

The details of the sixth round match were published on 8 October 2019.

=== Preliminary round (Mayotte) ===
This match was played on 27 February 2019.

Preliminary round results: Mayotte
Tie no	Home team (tier)	Score	Away team (tier)
1.	(Mayotte) Maharavo FC (R3)	0–1	USC Kangani (R3) (Mayotte)

Note: Mayotte League structure (no promotion to French League structure):
Régionale 1 (R1)
Régionale 2 (R2)
Régionale 3 (R3)
Régionale 4 (R4)

=== First round (Mayotte) ===
These matches were played on 20 and 27 March 2019.

First round results: Mayotte
Tie no	Home team (tier)	Score	Away team (tier)
1.	(Mayotte) FC Shingabwé (R3)	3–1	Mahabou SC (R3) (Mayotte)
2.	(Mayotte) FC Chiconi (R3)	0–4	AS Sada (R2) (Mayotte)
3.	(Mayotte) ASC Wahadi (R4)	1–2	UCS Sada (R1) (Mayotte)
4.	(Mayotte) FC Kani-Bé (R3)	4–1	ASC Abeilles (R1) (Mayotte)
5.	(Mayotte) N'Drema Club (R4)	3–0	Racine du Nord (R3) (Mayotte)
6.	(Mayotte) FC Ylang de Koungou (R3)	3–2	AS Ndranavi (R3) (Mayotte)
7.	(Mayotte) ASJ Moinatrindri (R2)	7–1	Voulvavi SC (R4) (Mayotte)
8.	(Mayotte) Enfant du Port (R3)	0–1 (Note: ASJ Handréma penalised due to fielding a suspended player. Enfant du Port qualify.)	ASJ Handréma (R3) (Mayotte)
9.	(Mayotte) FMJ Vahibé (R4)	1–3	US Ouangani (R3) (Mayotte)
10.	(Mayotte) US Bandréle (R4)	3–2	FC Dembeni (R2) (Mayotte)
11.	(Mayotte) AS Jumeaux de M'zouazia (R1)	2–1 (a.e.t.)	Foudre 2000 (R1) (Mayotte)
12.	(Mayotte) Espoir Mtsapéré (R3)	1–2	FC Sohoa (R2) (Mayotte)
13.	(Mayotte) Espoir Club de Longoni (R3)	1–0	Miracle du Sud (R4) (Mayotte)
14.	(Mayotte) Olympique de Miréréni (R1)	3–1	VCO Vahibé (R2) (Mayotte)
15.	(Mayotte) AS Neige (R2)	2–1	AS Bandraboua (R2) (Mayotte)
16.	(Mayotte) US Kavani (R3)	2–3 (a.e.t.)	Enfants de Mayotte (R2)
17.	(Mayotte) AJ Mtsahara (R3)	3–1	Espérance d'Iloni (R3) (Mayotte)
18.	(Mayotte) VSS Hagnoudrou (R4)	0–1	AS Defense de Kawéni (R2) (Mayotte)
19.	(Mayotte) Feu du Centre (R4)	0–3	TCO Mamoudzou (R4) (Mayotte)
20.	(Mayotte) USC Anteou Poroani (R1)	1–2	FC Mtsapéré (R1) (Mayotte)
21.	(Mayotte) Diables Noirs (R1)	6–3	FC Majicavo (R2) (Mayotte)
22.	(Mayotte) AS Kahani (R4)	1–2	Etincelles Hamjago (R2) (Mayotte)
23.	(Mayotte) Pamandzi SC (R4)	0–0 (3–2 p)	RC Barakani (R4) (Mayotte)
24.	(Mayotte) AOE Chiconi (R3)	– (Note: AOE Chiconi penalised due to providing insufficient lighting for the match to take place. AS Rosador qualify.)	AS Rosador (R1) (Mayotte)
25.	(Mayotte) FC Labattoir (R3)	1–0	AJ Kani-Kéli (R3) (Mayotte)
26.	(Mayotte) AS Papillon d'Honneur (R4)	0–4	Bandrélé FC (R3) (Mayotte)
27.	(Mayotte) ASCEE Nyambadao (R4)	2–1	US Mtsangamboua (R4) (Mayotte)
28.	(Mayotte) FCO Tsingoni (R4)	0–1	Tchanga SC (R1) (Mayotte)
29.	(Mayotte) M'Tsanga 2000 (R3)	2–1	Choungui FC (R3) (Mayotte)
30.	(Mayotte) Tornade Club de Majicavo (R3)	– (Note: Tornade Club de Majicavo did not show. USCJ Koungou qualify.)	USCJ Koungou (R1) (Mayotte)
31.	(Mayotte) ACSJ M'Liha (R4)	2–4	ASC Kaweni (R1) (Mayotte)
32.	(Mayotte) USC Kangani (R3)	1–0	USC Labattoir (R2) (Mayotte)

Note: Mayotte League structure (no promotion to French League structure):
Régionale 1 (R1)
Régionale 2 (R2)
Régionale 3 (R3)
Régionale 4 (R4)

=== Second round (Mayotte) ===
These matches were played on 4 May 2019, with one rescheduled for 10 June 2019.

Second round results: Mayotte
Tie no	Home team (tier)	Score	Away team (tier)
1.	(Mayotte) ASJ Moinatrindri (R2)	1–0	AS Neige (R2) (Mayotte)
2.	(Mayotte) Enfant du Port (R3)	1–2	FC Shingabwé (R3) (Mayotte)
3.	(Mayotte) AS Rosador (R1)	0–2	Diables Noirs (R1) (Mayotte)
4.	(Mayotte) Bandrélé FC (R3)	1–2 (a.e.t.)	UCS Sada (R1) (Mayotte)
5.	(Mayotte) AS Sada (R2)	0–2	FC Mtsapéré (R1) (Mayotte)
6.	(Mayotte) FC Ylang de Koungou (R3)	1–5	Enfants de Mayotte (R2)
7.	(Mayotte) Espoir Club de Longoni (R3)	2–1	USC Kangani (R3) (Mayotte)
8.	(Mayotte) N'Drema Club (R4)	3–2	TCO Mamoudzou (R4) (Mayotte)
9.	(Mayotte) US Bandréle (R4)	1–0	Etincelles Hamjago (R2) (Mayotte)
10.	(Mayotte) AJ Mtsahara (R3)	0–1	ASC Kaweni (R1) (Mayotte)
11.	(Mayotte) ASCEE Nyambadao (R4)	2–4	FC Labattoir (R3) (Mayotte)
12.	(Mayotte) Pamandzi SC (R4)	0–1	Olympique de Miréréni (R1) (Mayotte)
13.	(Mayotte) FC Sohoa (R2)	4–4 (2–3 p)	M'Tsanga 2000 (R3) (Mayotte)
14.	(Mayotte) FC Kani-Bé (R3)	1–0	Tchanga SC (R1) (Mayotte)
15.	(Mayotte) US Ouangani (R3)	2–2 (3–2 p)	AS Jumeaux de M'zouazia (R1) (Mayotte)
16.	(Mayotte) USCJ Koungou (R1)	2–3	AS Defense de Kawéni (R2) (Mayotte)

Note: Mayotte League structure (no promotion to French League structure):
Régionale 1 (R1)
Régionale 2 (R2)
Régionale 3 (R3)
Régionale 4 (R4)

=== Third round (Mayotte) ===
These matches were played between 22 and 29 June 2019.

Third round results: Mayotte
Tie no	Home team (tier)	Score	Away team (tier)
1.	(Mayotte) US Ouangani (R3)	0–1	UCS Sada (R1) (Mayotte)
2.	(Mayotte) FC Mtsapéré (R1)	0–0 (5–4 p)	AS Defense de Kawéni (R2) (Mayotte)
3.	(Mayotte) FC Shingabwé (R3)	1–2	FC Kani-Bé (R3) (Mayotte)
4.	(Mayotte) M'Tsanga 2000 (R3)	1–2	ASC Kaweni (R1) (Mayotte)
5.	(Mayotte) N'Drema Club (R4)	1–2	US Bandréle (R4) (Mayotte)
6.	(Mayotte) Espoir Club de Longoni (R3)	0–4	Diables Noirs (R1) (Mayotte)
7.	(Mayotte) Olympique de Miréréni (R1)	6–5 (4–3 p)	ASJ Moinatrindri (R2) (Mayotte)
8.	(Mayotte) FC Labattoir (R3)	2–1	Enfants de Mayotte (R2)

Note: Mayotte League structure (no promotion to French League structure):
Régionale 1 (R1)
Régionale 2 (R2)
Régionale 3 (R3)
Régionale 4 (R4)

=== Fourth round (Mayotte) ===
These matches were played on 3 August 2019.

Fourth round results: Mayotte
Tie no	Home team (tier)	Score	Away team (tier)
1.	(Mayotte) UCS Sada (R1)	0–1	Olympique de Miréréni (R1) (Mayotte)
2.	(Mayotte) FC Kani-Bé (R3)	2–1	US Bandréle (R4) (Mayotte)
3.	(Mayotte) ASC Kaweni (R1)	2–1	Diables Noirs (R1) (Mayotte)
4.	(Mayotte) FC Labattoir (R3)	0–1	FC Mtsapéré (R1) (Mayotte)

Note: Mayotte League structure (no promotion to French League structure):
Régionale 1 (R1)
Régionale 2 (R2)
Régionale 3 (R3)
Régionale 4 (R4)

=== Fifth round (Mayotte) ===
These matches were played on 14 September 2019, with one replayed on 29 September 2019.

Fifth round results: Mayotte
Tie no	Home team (tier)	Score	Away team (tier)
1.	(Mayotte) FC Kani-Bé (R3)	0–5	FC Mtsapéré (R1) (Mayotte)
2.	(Mayotte) Olympique de Miréréni (R1)	1–0 (Note: Match abandoned with the scoreline 0–1 on 14 September 2019. The game was replayed on 29 September 2019.)	ASC Kaweni (R1) (Mayotte)

Note: Mayotte League structure (no promotion to French League structure):
Régionale 1 (R1)
Régionale 2 (R2)
Régionale 3 (R3)
Régionale 4 (R4)

=== Sixth round (Mayotte) ===
This match was played on 12 October 2019.

Sixth round results: Mayotte
Tie no	Home team (tier)	Score	Away team (tier)
1.	(Mayotte) FC Mtsapéré (R1)	5–1	Olympique de Miréréni (R1) (Mayotte)

Note: Mayotte League structure (no promotion to French League structure):
Régionale 1 (R1)
Régionale 2 (R2)
Régionale 3 (R3)
Régionale 4 (R4)

== Réunion ==
The draw for the competition was made on 12 April 2019, with a total of 42 clubs participating from Régionale 1 and Régional 2 divisions. To achieve the required outcome of two clubs qualifying for the seventh round, a total of five rounds are required. To align with the other qualifying competitions, this competition starts at the second round. The 14 Régionale 1 clubs and 8 of the Régionale 2 clubs were exempted to the third round.

Rounds three to six were straight knockouts, each drawn in two groups, to produce one winning team who would play in the seventh round at home and one winning team who would travel to France.

=== Second round (Réunion) ===
These matches were played on 20 and 21 April 2019. with one rescheduled for 2 June 2019.

Second round results: Réunion
Tie no	Home team (tier)	Score	Away team (tier)
1.	(Réunion) CO Saint-Pierre (R2)	4–2	FC Moufia (R2) (Réunion)
2.	(Réunion) AS Saint-Philippe (R2)	3–1	AFC Halte-Là (R2) (Réunion)
3.	(Réunion) AS Etoile du Sud (R2)	2–3	OC Saint-André les Léopards (R2) (Réunion)
4.	(Réunion) AS Guillaume (R2)	0–2	AEFC Étang Saint-Leu (R2) (Réunion)
5.	(Réunion) FC Parfin Saint-André (R2)	4–0	FC du 17ème Km (R2) (Réunion)
6.	(Réunion) AS Évêché (R2)	1–0	AJS Bois d'Olives (R2) (Réunion)
7.	(Réunion) FC Ligne Paradis (R2)	3–0	JS Bras Creux (R2) (Réunion)
8.	(Réunion) FC Plaine des Grègues (R2)	2–0	Union Saint-Benoît (R2) (Réunion)
9.	(Réunion) SS Rivière Sport (R2)	2–3	US Bellemène Canot (R2) (Réunion)
10.	(Réunion) ASC Corbeil (R2)	2–4	AJS Saint-Denis (R2) (Réunion)

Note: Reúnion League structure (no promotion to French League structure):
Régionale 1 (R1)
Régionale 2 (R2)
Départementale 1 (D1)

=== Third round (Réunion) ===
These matches were played between 1 and 7 June 2019.

Third round results: Réunion
Tie no	Home team (tier)	Score	Away team (tier)
1.	(Réunion) CO Saint-Pierre (R2)	0–4	Trois Bassins FC (R1) (Réunion)
2.	(Réunion) AJ Petite-Île (R2)	1–3	SS Jeanne d'Arc (R1) (Réunion)
3.	(Réunion) Saint Denis EDFA (R1)	1–2	OC Saint-André les Léopards (R2) (Réunion)
4.	(Réunion) ASC Possession (R2)	1–1 (4–5 p)	ES Étang-Salé (R2) (Réunion)
5.	(Réunion) Saint-Denis FC (R1)	3–0	AJS Saint-Denis (R2) (Réunion)
6.	(Réunion) AS Saint-Louisienne (R1)	2–0	AEFC Étang Saint-Leu (R2) (Réunion)
7.	(Réunion) Sainte-Rose FC (R2)	1–3	AF Saint-Louisien (R1) (Réunion)
8.	(Réunion) JS Saint-Pierroise (R1)	5–1	FC Plaine des Grègues (R2) (Réunion)
9.	(Réunion) US Sainte-Marienne (R1)	4–0	AS Saint-Philippe (R2) (Réunion)
10.	(Réunion) ASC Grands Bois (R2)	0–2	AS Excelsior (R1) (Réunion)
11.	(Réunion) La Tamponnaise (R1)	3–0	US Bellemène Canot (R2) (Réunion)
12.	(Réunion) AS Capricorne (R1)	4–0	AS Évêché (R2) (Réunion)
13.	(Réunion) AS Marsouins (R1)	0–0 (4–2 p)	FC Bagatelle Sainte-Suzanne (R2) (Réunion)
14.	(Réunion) AS Sainte-Suzanne (R1)	5–2	FC Ligne Paradis (R2) (Réunion)
15.	(Réunion) Saint-Pauloise FC (R1)	0–2	AS Bretagne (R2) (Réunion)
16.	(Réunion) FC Parfin Saint-André (R2)	1–1 (2–4 p)	ACF Piton Saint-Leu (R2) (Réunion)

Note: Reúnion League structure (no promotion to French League structure):
Régionale 1 (R1)
Régionale 2 (R2)
Départementale 1 (D1)

=== Fourth round (Réunion) ===
These matches were played on 18 August 2019.

Fourth round results: Réunion
Tie no	Home team (tier)	Score	Away team (tier)
1.	(Réunion) JS Saint-Pierroise (R1)	9–1	ES Étang-Salé (R2) (Réunion)
2.	(Réunion) Saint-Denis FC (R1)	1–0	OC Saint-André les Léopards (R2) (Réunion)
3.	(Réunion) SS Jeanne d'Arc (R1)	4–2	AS Saint-Louisienne (R1) (Réunion)
4.	(Réunion) Trois Bassins FC (R1)	1–2	AF Saint-Louisien (R1) (Réunion)
5.	(Réunion) US Sainte-Marienne (R1)	1–0	AS Bretagne (R2) (Réunion)
6.	(Réunion) AS Excelsior (R1)	0–0 (2–1 p)	ACF Piton Saint-Leu (R2) (Réunion)
7.	(Réunion) La Tamponnaise (R1)	1–1 (4–5 p)	AS Marsouins (R1) (Réunion)
8.	(Réunion) AS Capricorne (R1)	1–0 (a.e.t.)	AS Sainte-Suzanne (R1) (Réunion)

Note: Reúnion League structure (no promotion to French League structure):
Régionale 1 (R1)
Régionale 2 (R2)
Départementale 1 (D1)

=== Fifth round (Réunion) ===
These matches are scheduled to be played on 14, 15 and 25 September 2019.

Fifth round results: Réunion
Tie no	Home team (tier)	Score	Away team (tier)
1.	(Réunion) AF Saint-Louisien (R1)	2–2 (4–3 p)	Saint-Denis FC (R1) (Réunion)
2.	(Réunion) SS Jeanne d'Arc (R1)	0–0 (3–5 p)	JS Saint-Pierroise (R1) (Réunion)
3.	(Réunion) AS Marsouins (R1)	0–4	US Sainte-Marienne (R1) (Réunion)
4.	(Réunion) AS Excelsior (R1)	0–0 (2–3 p)	AS Capricorne (R1) (Réunion)

Note: Reúnion League structure (no promotion to French League structure):
Régionale 1 (R1)
Régionale 2 (R2)
Départementale 1 (D1)

=== Sixth round (Réunion) ===
These matches were played on 27 October 2019.

Sixth round results: Réunion
Tie no	Home team (tier)	Score	Away team (tier)
1.	(Réunion) JS Saint-Pierroise (R1)	4–1	AF Saint-Louisien (R1) (Réunion)
2.	(Réunion) US Sainte-Marienne (R1)	1–0	AS Capricorne (R1) (Réunion)

Note: Reúnion League structure (no promotion to French League structure):
Régionale 1 (R1)
Régionale 2 (R2)
Départementale 1 (D1)

== French Guiana ==
The initial draw was made on 8 July 2019, with a total of 32 teams competing from Régionale 1 and Régionale 2 divisions. The draw for the fourth round was published on 16 September 2019. Eight ties were drawn.

The draw for the fifth round was published on 30 September 2019. Four ties were drawn.

The draw for the sixth round was published on 16 October 2019. The two final ties were drawn, the winners of which qualify for the seventh round.

=== Third round: (French Guiana) ===
This season, the preliminary rounds start with the third round, due to the number of teams entered. These matches were played between 21 and 25 August 2019, with two rearranged for 7 September 2019 and one rearranged for 14 September.

Third round results: French Guiana
Tie no	Home team (tier)	Score	Away team (tier)
1.	(French Guiana) CSC Cayenne (R1)	5–0	ASC Armire (R2) (French Guiana)
2.	(French Guiana) Le Geldar De Kourou (R1)	1–0	ASC Rémire (R1) (French Guiana)
3.	(French Guiana) Olympique Cayenne (R1)	0–0 (3–4 p)	AJ Saint-Georges (R1) (French Guiana)
4.	(French Guiana) AOJ Mana (R2)	0–3 (Note: Tie won by means of forfeit.)	ASC Karib (R2) (French Guiana)
5.	(French Guiana) ASC Arc-en-Ciel (R2)	3–0	EJ Balate (R2) (French Guiana)
6.	(French Guiana) Kourou FC (R1)	3–5	ASC Agouado (R1) (French Guiana)
7.	(French Guiana) US Sinnamary (R2)	3–5 (a.e.t.)	FC Oyapock (R1) (French Guiana)
8.	(French Guiana) Dynamo De Soula (R2)	3–1	AJ Balata Abriba (R2) (French Guiana)
9.	(French Guiana) ASC Ouest (R2)	2–0	ASL Sport Guyanais (R2) (French Guiana)
10.	(French Guiana) USL Montjoly (R2)	6–1	EF Iracoubo (R2) (French Guiana)
11.	(French Guiana) US St Élie (R2)	1–4	SC Kouroucien (R1) (French Guiana)
12.	(French Guiana) USC Montsinery (R2)	0–5	ASE Matoury (R1) (French Guiana)
13.	(French Guiana) ASU Grand Santi (R1)	2–1	Loyola OC (R2) (French Guiana)
14.	(French Guiana) US de Matoury (R1)	4–1	FC Family (none) (French Guiana)
15.	(French Guiana) USC De Roura (R2)	3–1	ASCS Maripasoula (none) (French Guiana)
16.	(French Guiana) ASC Kawina (none)	6–1	US Macouria (R2) (French Guiana)

Note: French Guiana League structure (no promotion to French League structure):
Régional 1 (R1)
Régional 2 (R2)

=== Fourth round: (French Guiana) ===
These matches were played between 18 and 21 September 2019.

Fourth round results: French Guiana
Tie no	Home team (tier)	Score	Away team (tier)
1.	(French Guiana) AJ Saint-Georges (R1)	3–2	USL Montjoly (R2) (French Guiana)
2.	(French Guiana) ASC Karib (R2)	1–2	CSC Cayenne (R1) (French Guiana)
3.	(French Guiana) ASC Kawina (none)	2–1	Dynamo De Soula (R2) (French Guiana)
4.	(French Guiana) ASU Grand Santi (R1)	0–3	Le Geldar De Kourou (R1) (French Guiana)
5.	(French Guiana) FC Oyapock (R1)	3–2 (a.e.t.)	US de Matoury (R1) (French Guiana)
6.	(French Guiana) SC Kouroucien (R1)	0–0 (4–3 p)	USC De Roura (R2) (French Guiana)
7.	(French Guiana) ASE Matoury (R1)	3–2	ASC Arc-en-Ciel (R2) (French Guiana)
8.	(French Guiana) ASC Agouado (R1)	1–2 (a.e.t.)	ASC Ouest (R2) (French Guiana)

Note: French Guiana League structure (no promotion to French League structure):
Régional 1 (R1)
Régional 2 (R2)

=== Fifth round: (French Guiana) ===
These matches were played on 5 October 2019.

Fifth round results: French Guiana
Tie no	Home team (tier)	Score	Away team (tier)
1.	(French Guiana) FC Oyapock (R1)	1–2	ASE Matoury (R1) (French Guiana)
2.	(French Guiana) ASC Ouest (R2)	1–2	CSC Cayenne (R1) (French Guiana)
3.	(French Guiana) Le Geldar De Kourou (R1)	0–0 (3–4 p)	AJ Saint-Georges (R1) (French Guiana)
4.	(French Guiana) ASC Kawina (none)	4–0	SC Kouroucien (R1) (French Guiana)

Note: French Guiana League structure (no promotion to French League structure):
Régional 1 (R1)
Régional 2 (R2)

=== Sixth round: (French Guiana) ===
These matches were played on 25 and 26 October 2019.

Sixth round results: French Guiana
Tie no	Home team (tier)	Score	Away team (tier)
1.	(French Guiana) ASE Matoury (R1)	0–0 (2–4 p)	AJ Saint-Georges (R1) (French Guiana)
2.	(French Guiana) CSC Cayenne (R1)	1–1 (4–2 p)	ASC Kawina (none) (French Guiana)

Note: French Guiana League structure (no promotion to French League structure):
Régional 1 (R1)
Régional 2 (R2)

== Martinique ==
A total of 52 teams from the three Régionale divisions entered the competition. Twelve teams (eleven from Régionale 1 and one from Régionale 2) were awarded a bye in the opening round, leaving 20 ties involving 40 teams. Only 19 were played, with the tie between Olympique Le Marin and AS Silver Star being void due to AS Silver Star withdrawing.

In the third round, the 19 winners were joined by AS Silver Star plus the twelve original byes, with 16 ties drawn. In the fourth round, eight ties were drawn.

The fifth round draw was made on 30 September 2019, with four ties drawn.

The sixth round draw was made on 12 October 2019, with two ties drawn.

=== Second round (Martinique) ===
This season, the preliminary rounds start with the second round, due to the number of clubs entered. These matches were played between 24 and 31 August 2019.

Second round results: Martinique
Tie no	Home team (tier)	Score	Away team (tier)
1.	(Martinique) Eveil les Trois-Îlets (R3)	1–2	RC St Joseph (R1) (Martinique)
2.	(Martinique) Emulation (R2)	1–2	CS Vauclinois (R2) (Martinique)
3.	(Martinique) CS Case-Pilote (R2)	2–2 (1–2 p)	US Diamantinoise (R2) (Martinique)
4.	(Martinique) Olympique Le Marin (R2)	void	AS Silver Star (R2) (Martinique)
5.	(Martinique) Étincelle Macouba (R3)	1–0 (a.e.t.) (Note: Étincelle Macouba penalised for fielding an ineligible player. Réal Tartane qualify.)	Réal Tartane (R2) (Martinique)
6.	(Martinique) CSC Carbet (R3)	1–5 (Note: Etendard Bellefontaine penalised for fielding an ineligible player. CSC Carbet qualify.)	Etendard Bellefontaine (R2) (Martinique)
7.	(Martinique) Santana Club (R3)	2–1	Anses Arlets FC (R2) (Martinique)
8.	(Martinique) Good Luck (R2)	1–2 (Note: AS Eclair Rivière-Salée penalised for fielding a suspended player. Good Luck qualify.)	AS Eclair Rivière-Salée (R2) (Martinique)
9.	(Martinique) Entente FC Lucéenne (R2)	1–2	AC Vert-Pré (R2) (Martinique)
10.	(Martinique) UJ Monnérot (R1)	4–3 (a.e.t.) (Note: UJ Monnérot penalised for fielding two suspended players. Assaut de St Pierre qualify.)	Assaut de St Pierre (R2) (Martinique)
11.	(Martinique) La Gauloise de Trinité (R3)	3–3 (4–2 p)	L'Intrépide Club (R3) (Martinique)
12.	(Martinique) JS Eucalyptus (R2)	2–1	Gri-Gri Pilotin FC (R3) (Martinique)
13.	(Martinique) AS Morne-des-Esses (R2)	3–0	AS Excelsior (R2) (Martinique)
14.	(Martinique) Golden Star (R2)	8–0	AS Étoile Basse-Pointe (R2) (Martinique)
15.	(Martinique) ASC Hirondelle (R3)	1–3 (a.e.t.)	Club Péléen (R3) (Martinique)
16.	(Martinique) SC Lamentin (R3)	0–6	CO Trenelle (R1) (Martinique)
17.	(Martinique) ASC Eudorçait-Fourniols (R3)	4–3 (a.e.t.)	CO Dillon-Ste Thérèse (R3) (Martinique)
18.	(Martinique) ASC Môn Pito (R2)	3–2 (a.e.t.)	Stade Spiritain (R2) (Martinique)
19.	(Martinique) UJ Redoute (R3)	3–0 (Note: Tie won by means of forfeit.)	CS Bélimois (R3) (Martinique)
20.	(Martinique) US Marinoise (R2)	2–0	AS New Club (R2) (Martinique)

Note: Martinique League structure (no promotion to French League structure):
Régionale 1 (R1)
Régionale 2 (R2)
Régionale 3 (R3)

=== Third round (Martinique) ===
These matches were played between 13 and 15 September 2019.

Third round results: Martinique
Tie no	Home team (tier)	Score	Away team (tier)
1.	(Martinique) AS Morne-des-Esses (R2)	2–1 (a.e.t.)	Santana Club (R3) (Martinique)
2.	(Martinique) Club Colonial (R1)	7–0	ASC Môn Pito (R2) (Martinique)
3.	(Martinique) US Diamantinoise (R2)	2–4	Olympique Le Marin (R2) (Martinique)
4.	(Martinique) Club Péléen (R3)	1–4	JS Eucalyptus (R2) (Martinique)
5.	(Martinique) RC Lorrain (R1)	1–0	RC Rivière-Pilote (R1) (Martinique)
6.	(Martinique) Golden Star (R2)	3–0	La Gauloise de Trinité (R3) (Martinique)
7.	(Martinique) AC Vert-Pré (R2)	6–3	CSC Carbet (R3) (Martinique)
8.	(Martinique) Réveil Sportif (R1)	1–4	Club Franciscain (R1) (Martinique)
9.	(Martinique) Réal Tartane (R2)	1–4	New Star Ducos (R1) (Martinique)
10.	(Martinique) US Marinoise (R2)	1–1 (4–1 p)	Essor-Préchotain (R1) (Martinique)
11.	(Martinique) US Riveraine (R2)	7–2	UJ Redoute (R3) (Martinique)
12.	(Martinique) CS Vauclinois (R2)	0–5	Golden Lion FC (R1) (Martinique)
13.	(Martinique) RC St Joseph (R1)	1–0	Assaut de St Pierre (R2) (Martinique)
14.	(Martinique) CO Trenelle (R1)	2–1	Aiglon du Lamentin (R1) (Martinique)
15.	(Martinique) AS Samaritaine (R1)	2–1 (a.e.t.)	US Robert (R1) (Martinique)
16.	(Martinique) ASC Eudorçait-Fourniols (R3)	0–4	Good Luck (R2) (Martinique)

Note: Martinique League structure (no promotion to French League structure):
Régionale 1 (R1)
Régionale 2 (R2)
Régionale 3 (R3)

=== Fourth round (Martinique) ===
These matches were played on 24 and 25 September 2019.

Fourth round results: Martinique
Tie no	Home team (tier)	Score	Away team (tier)
1.	(Martinique) US Riveraine (R2)	1–2	AS Samaritaine (R1) (Martinique)
2.	(Martinique) JS Eucalyptus (R2)	3–5	Golden Star (R2) (Martinique)
3.	(Martinique) AS Morne-des-Esses (R2)	0–1	CO Trenelle (R1) (Martinique)
4.	(Martinique) AC Vert-Pré (R2)	0–1	RC Lorrain (R1) (Martinique)
5.	(Martinique) Olympique Le Marin (R2)	0–1	Club Colonial (R1) (Martinique)
6.	(Martinique) Good Luck (R2)	1–2	Golden Lion FC (R1) (Martinique)
7.	(Martinique) New Star Ducos (R1)	1–0	US Marinoise (R2) (Martinique)
8.	(Martinique) Club Franciscain (R1)	2–0	RC St Joseph (R1) (Martinique)

Note: Martinique League structure (no promotion to French League structure):
Régionale 1 (R1)
Régionale 2 (R2)
Régionale 3 (R3)

=== Fifth round (Martinique) ===
These matches were played on 4 and 5 October 2019.

Fifth round results: Martinique
Tie no	Home team (tier)	Score	Away team (tier)
1.	(Martinique) Club Colonial (R1)	3–1	RC Lorrain (R1) (Martinique)
2.	(Martinique) New Star Ducos (R1)	0–3	Club Franciscain (R1) (Martinique)
3.	(Martinique) Golden Star (R2)	2–2 (3–2 p)	Golden Lion FC (R1) (Martinique)
4.	(Martinique) CO Trenelle (R1)	0–5	AS Samaritaine (R1) (Martinique)

Note: Martinique League structure (no promotion to French League structure):
Régionale 1 (R1)
Régionale 2 (R2)
Régionale 3 (R3)

=== Sixth round (Martinique) ===
These matches were played on 23 October 2019.

Sixth round results: Martinique
Tie no	Home team (tier)	Score	Away team (tier)
1.	(Martinique) AS Samaritaine (R1)	0–1	Golden Star (R2) (Martinique)
2.	(Martinique) Club Franciscain (R1)	2–1	Club Colonial (R1) (Martinique)

Note: Martinique League structure (no promotion to French League structure):
Régionale 1 (R1)
Régionale 2 (R2)
Régionale 3 (R3)

== Guadeloupe ==
The draw for the opening round was made on 10 August 2019, with a total of 52 clubs participating. To align with the other qualifying competitions, this competition started at the second round. Twelve clubs from the Régional 1 division were exempted to the third round.

The sixteen ties of the third round were drawn on 3 September 2019. The fourth round draw, with eight ties, followed on 20 September 2019. The draw for the fifth round was made at the start of October 2019. The sixth round was drawn in the week of 25 October 2019. The sixth round was drawn in the week of 25 October 2019.

=== Second round (Guadeloupe) ===
This season, the preliminary rounds start with the second round, due to the number of clubs entering. These matches were played between 31 August and 10 September 2019.

Second round results: Guadeloupe
Tie no	Home team (tier)	Score	Away team (tier)
1.	(Guadeloupe) SC Baie-Mahault (R2)	4–1	Mondial Club (R3) (Guadeloupe)
2.	(Guadeloupe) L'Etoile de Morne-à-l'Eau (R2)	0–0 (3–4 p)	CS Capesterre-Belle-Eau (R3) (Guadeloupe)
3.	(Guadeloupe) CS Bouillantais (R2)	0–2	Jeunesse Evolution (R1) (Guadeloupe)
4.	(Guadeloupe) ASG Juventus de Sainte-Anne (R2)	4–9	Dynamo Le Moule (R2) (Guadeloupe)
5.	(Guadeloupe) Résistance Bouillante (R3)	1–1 (3–1 p) (Note: Tie reversed with agreement of both clubs.)	Solidarité Port-Louisienne (R3) (Guadeloupe)
6.	(Guadeloupe) Étoile de l'Ouest (R3)	5–0	AJ St Félix (R3) (Guadeloupe)
7.	(Guadeloupe) L'Éclair de Petit-Bourg (R2)	2–0	JSC Marie Galante (R3) (Guadeloupe)
8.	(Guadeloupe) ASC La Frégate (R3)	3–0 (Note: Tie won by means of forfeit.)	St Louis AC (R3) (Guadeloupe)
9.	(Guadeloupe) AO Gourbeyrienne (R2)	3–0	AS Juventa (R2) (Guadeloupe)
10.	(Guadeloupe) US Cambrefort (R3)	0–4	CS St François (R2) (Guadeloupe)
11.	(Guadeloupe) Red Star (R2)	1–2	ASC Madiana (R2) (Guadeloupe)
12.	(Guadeloupe) Cygne Noir (R2)	12–0	Zenith Morne-à-l'Eau (R3) (Guadeloupe)
13.	(Guadeloupe) FC St François (R2)	2–3	CA Marquisat (R3) (Guadeloupe)
14.	(Guadeloupe) Association Juvenis (R2)	1–3	Rapid Club (R2) (Guadeloupe)
15.	(Guadeloupe) Racing Club de Basse-Terre (R1)	3–1	AS Nenuphars (R2) (Guadeloupe)
16.	(Guadeloupe) JTR Trois Rivières (R3)	1–3	Olympique St Claudien (none) (Guadeloupe)
17.	(Guadeloupe) AS Le Moule (R2)	0–1 (a.e.t.)	USC de Bananier (R2) (Guadeloupe)
18.	(Guadeloupe) AS Dragon (R3)	1–0	Cactus Ste Anne (R2) (Guadeloupe)
19.	(Guadeloupe) JS Abymienne (R2)	7–1	Alliance FC (R3) (Guadeloupe)
20.	(Guadeloupe) ASC Siroco Les Abymes (R2)	6–0	US Ansoise (R3) (Guadeloupe)

Note: Guadeloupe League structure (no promotion to French League structure):
Ligue Régionale 1 (R1)
Ligue Régionale 2 (R2)
Ligue Régionale 3 (R3)

=== Third round (Guadeloupe) ===
These matches were played between 13 and 15 September 2019, with two postponed until 28 September 2019.

Third round results: Guadeloupe
Tie no	Home team (tier)	Score	Away team (tier)
1.	(Guadeloupe) Résistance Bouillante (R3)	1–5	Union des Artistes de Raizet (R1) (Guadeloupe)
2.	(Guadeloupe) SC Baie-Mahault (R2)	1–2	Arsenal Club (R1) (Guadeloupe)
3.	(Guadeloupe) AO Gourbeyrienne (R2)	2–1	ASC La Frégate (R3) (Guadeloupe)
4.	(Guadeloupe) Étoile de l'Ouest (R3)	3–2	L'Éclair de Petit-Bourg (R2) (Guadeloupe)
5.	(Guadeloupe) Unité Ste Rosienne (R1)	2–0	Dynamo Le Moule (R2) (Guadeloupe)
6.	(Guadeloupe) Stade Lamentinois (R1)	0–5	Jeunesse Evolution (R1) (Guadeloupe)
7.	(Guadeloupe) CS St François (R2)	1–4	US Baie-Mahault (R1) (Guadeloupe)
8.	(Guadeloupe) CS Capesterre-Belle-Eau (R3)	0–4	Amical Club Marie Galante (R1) (Guadeloupe)
9.	(Guadeloupe) ASC Madiana (R2)	0–1	Racing Club de Basse-Terre (R1) (Guadeloupe)
10.	(Guadeloupe) Olympique St Claudien (none)	4–1	Rapid Club (R2) (Guadeloupe)
11.	(Guadeloupe) USC de Bananier (R2)	3–1	AS Dragon (R3) (Guadeloupe)
12.	(Guadeloupe) Phare du Canal (R1)	8–2	Cygne Noir (R2) (Guadeloupe)
13.	(Guadeloupe) ASC Siroco Les Abymes (R2)	2–4	CS Moulien (R1) (Guadeloupe)
14.	(Guadeloupe) Solidarité-Scolaire (R1)	2–1	La Gauloise de Basse-Terre (R1) (Guadeloupe)
15.	(Guadeloupe) CA Marquisat (R3)	1–4	AS Le Gosier (R1) (Guadeloupe)
16.	(Guadeloupe) JS Vieux-Habitants (R1)	5–0	JS Abymienne (R2) (Guadeloupe)

Note: Guadeloupe League structure (no promotion to French League structure):
Ligue Régionale 1 (R1)
Ligue Régionale 2 (R2)
Ligue Régionale 3 (R3)

=== Fourth round (Guadeloupe) ===
These matches were played on 28 and 29 September 2019, with the exception of two games which were dependent on late games in the previous round, and are scheduled to be played on 6 and 9 October 2019.

Fourth round results: Guadeloupe
Tie no	Home team (tier)	Score	Away team (tier)
1.	(Guadeloupe) Amical Club Marie Galante (R1)	0–2	Unité Ste Rosienne (R1) (Guadeloupe)
2.	(Guadeloupe) Arsenal Club (R1)	1–1 (2–3 p)	Jeunesse Evolution (R1) (Guadeloupe)
3.	(Guadeloupe) Étoile de l'Ouest (R3)	1–8	Union des Artistes de Raizet (R1) (Guadeloupe)
4.	(Guadeloupe) US Baie-Mahault (R1)	3–3 (5–6 p)	AO Gourbeyrienne (R2) (Guadeloupe)
5.	(Guadeloupe) Racing Club de Basse-Terre (R1)	0–3	AS Le Gosier (R1) (Guadeloupe)
6.	(Guadeloupe) Olympique St Claudien (none)	1–5	USC de Bananier (R2) (Guadeloupe)
7.	(Guadeloupe) Phare du Canal (R1)	1–0	Solidarité-Scolaire (R1) (Guadeloupe)
8.	(Guadeloupe) CS Moulien (R1)	1–0	JS Vieux-Habitants (R1) (Guadeloupe)

Note: Guadeloupe League structure (no promotion to French League structure):
Ligue Régionale 1 (R1)
Ligue Régionale 2 (R2)
Ligue Régionale 3 (R3)

=== Fifth round (Guadeloupe) ===
These matches were played on 16 and 19 October 2019.

Fifth round results: Guadeloupe
Tie no	Home team (tier)	Score	Away team (tier)
1.	(Guadeloupe) Union des Artistes de Raizet (R1)	0–2	Jeunesse Evolution (R1) (Guadeloupe)
2.	(Guadeloupe) AO Gourbeyrienne (R2)	3–2	Unité Ste Rosienne (R1) (Guadeloupe)
3.	(Guadeloupe) AS Le Gosier (R1)	2–1 (a.e.t.) (Note: Tie reversed from original draw.)	Phare du Canal (R1) (Guadeloupe)
4.	(Guadeloupe) USC de Bananier (R2)	1–2	CS Moulien (R1) (Guadeloupe)

Note: Guadeloupe League structure (no promotion to French League structure):
Ligue Régionale 1 (R1)
Ligue Régionale 2 (R2)
Ligue Régionale 3 (R3)

=== Sixth round (Guadeloupe) ===
These matches were played on 26 and 27 October 2019.

Sixth round results: Guadeloupe
Tie no	Home team (tier)	Score	Away team (tier)
1.	(Guadeloupe) Jeunesse Evolution (R1)	4–0	AO Gourbeyrienne (R2) (Guadeloupe)
2.	(Guadeloupe) CS Moulien (R1)	2–1	AS Le Gosier (R1) (Guadeloupe)

Note: Guadeloupe League structure (no promotion to French League structure):
Ligue Régionale 1 (R1)
Ligue Régionale 2 (R2)
Ligue Régionale 3 (R3)

== Saint Pierre and Miquelon ==
Following a debut last year the Overseas Collectivity of Saint Pierre and Miquelon had a qualifying competition again. With only three teams in the collectivity, there is just one match in each of two rounds, with one team receiving a bye to the second round. The winner, AS Îlienne Amateurs, gained entry to the third round draw of the Auvergne-Rhône-Alpes region.

=== First round (Saint Pierre and Miquelon) ===
The match was played on 19 June 2019.

First round results: Saint Pierre and Miquelon
Tie no	Home team (tier)	Score	Away team (tier)
1.	(Saint Pierre and Miquelon) A.S. Saint Pierraise	1–2	A.S. Miquelonnaise (Saint Pierre and Miquelon)

=== Second round (Saint Pierre and Miquelon) ===
The match was played on 3 July 2019.

Second round results: Saint Pierre and Miquelon
Tie no	Home team (tier)	Score	Away team (tier)
1.	(Saint Pierre and Miquelon) A.S. Îlienne Amateur	3–0	A.S. Miquelonnaise (Saint Pierre and Miquelon)

== See also ==
- Overseas France teams in the main competition of the Coupe de France
