= List of football clubs in Réunion =

The following is an incomplete list of association football clubs based on the island of Réunion. For a complete list see Category:Football clubs in Réunion

== A ==
- FC Avirons

== C ==
- SS Capricorne

== E ==
- AS Excelsior

== G ==
- SS Gauloise

== J ==
- SS Jeanne d'Arc

== M ==
- AS Marsouins

== P ==
- AJ Petite-Ile

== R ==
- SS Rivière Sport

== S ==
- Saint-Denis FC
- Saint-Pauloise FC
- AS Saint-Louisienne
- US Sainte-Marienne
- JS Saint-Pierroise

== T ==
- La Tamponnaise
