= 2020 Réunion Premier League =

Réunion Premier League
- Season: 2020
- Top goalscorer: (Réunion) Pierrick Kéhi (9 goals)

The 2020 Réunion Premier League is the 71st season of the Réunion Premier League, the professional league for association football clubs in Réunion, since the league's establishment in 1950. The season started on 19 July 2020.

== League table ==
Pos	Team	Pld	W	D	L	GF	GA	GD	Pts	Promotion or qualification
1	Excelsior	12	9	1	2	29	7	+22	28	Qualification to 2021–22 CAF Champions League
2	Saint-Denis	13	8	3	2	32	16	+16	27	
3	Saint-Pierroise	12	7	4	1	18	5	+13	25	
4	Jeanne d'Arc	13	6	5	2	21	12	+9	23	
5	Sainte-Marienne	13	7	2	4	17	20	−3	23	
6	Capricorne	13	6	2	5	14	11	+3	20	
7	Trois-Bassins	13	6	2	5	15	14	+1	20	
8	La Tamponnaise	13	3	8	2	14	10	+4	17	
9	Bretagne	13	5	1	7	10	17	−7	16	
10	Marsouins	13	4	2	7	13	18	−5	14	
11	Saint-Louisienne	13	4	2	7	11	20	−9	14	
12	Piton Saint-Leu	13	2	3	8	7	16	−9	9	
13	SDEFA	13	1	4	8	2	16	−14	7	Relegation to Super Division 2
14	Saint-Pauloise	13	2	1	10	8	29	−21	7	Relegation to Super Division 2

Updated to match(es) played on 13 December 2020. Source: Soccerway
Rules for classification: 1) Points; 2) Goal difference; 3) Goals scored; 4) Head-to-head points; 5) Head-to-head goal difference; 6) Head-to-head goals scored

== Results ==
Home \ Away	BRE	CAP	EXC	JEA	LAT	MAR	PIT	SAD	SAL	SAP	STP	STM	SDE	TRO
Bretagne			0–3	0–3			2–1				0–1	0–1	2–0	
Capricorne	2–0		0–3		0–0		1–0		4–0			0–0	1–0	
Excelsior					0–1		2–0		2–1	7–1				1–0
Jeanne d'Arc		1–0	1–3		1–1	0–0						2–0		2–3
La Tamponnaise	1–2						1–0	3–3		5–1	0–0	1–1		
Marsouins	1–0	1–3	1–0		0–0			1–3						2–3
Piton Saint-Leu				1–1		1–0		0–1			0–1	1–5	0–0	1–2
Saint-Denis	1–1	3–2	2–2	0–1					2–1	1–0			5–0	
Saint-Louisienne	0–2			1–1	2–1	2–1	0–2			1–0	2–1			
Saint-Pauloise	2–0	2–0		1–5		0–1	0–0				0–3	0–3		
Saint-Pierroise		1–0		2–2		3–1		3–0					0–0	0–0
Sainte-Marienne			0–3			3–2		0–8	1–0		0–3		1–0	2–0
SDEFA			0–3	0–1	0–0	0–1			0–0	2–1				
Trois-Bassins	0–1	0–1			0–0			2–3	3–1	1–0			1–0	

Updated to match(es) played on 13 December 2020. Source: Soccerway
Legend: Blue = home team win; Yellow = draw; Red = away team win.

== Top scorers ==
Rank	Player	Club	Goals
1	(Réunion) Pierrick Kéhi	SS Jeanne d'Arc	9
2	(Réunion) Jean-Michel Fontaine	JS Saint-Pierroise	7
2	(Réunion) Habib Maoulida	AS Saint-Louisienne	7
4	(France) Steven Papin	JS Saint-Pierroise	6
5	(Réunion) Mohamed El	AS Excelsior	5
5	(Réunion) Akbar Assoumani	Saint-Denis FC	5
5	(Madagascar) Fabrice	US Sainte-Marienne	5
5	(Madagascar) Angelo	Saint-Denis FC	5
9	(Réunion) Quentin Boesso	AS Capricorne	4
9	(Réunion) Thierry Edmond	Trois Bassins	4
