= Réunion Premier League =

Top division association football league in the French territory of Réunion

- Founded: 1950
- Country: Réunion
- Confederation: CAF
- Number of clubs: 14
- Level on pyramid: 1
- Domestic cup(s): Coupe de la Réunion; Coupe de France
- International cup(s): Champions League; Confederation Cup
- Current champions: JS Saint-Pierroise (2025)
- Most championships: JS Saint-Pierroise (20)
- Most appearances: (Réunion) Jean-Noël Ajorque (457 games)
- Top scorer: (Réunion) Tsimba Kely Razafitsialonina (243 goals)
- Website: liguefoot-reunion.fff.fr
- Current: 2026 Réunion Premier League

The Réunion Premier League, also known as Championnat de La Réunion de football, is the top division of football league system in the French overseas territory of Réunion. The league is run and managed by the Réunionese Football League under the watch of the French Football Federation. Réunion Premier League was created in 1950 and the most successful club is JS Saint-Pierroise, who have won 17 league titles. The defending champions are JS Saint-Pierroise. The winner of the competition earns a berth in the CAF Champions League. In the French pyramid system, the Réunion Premier League is positioned in the Division d'Honneur, the sixth level of French football.

The league has produced several professional Ligue 1 players, as well as players who have gone on to have successful careers abroad. Players such as Jean-Pierre Bade, Guillaume Hoarau, Florent Sinama Pongolle, Dimitri Payet, and Jean-Pascal Fontaine all began their careers on the island before achieving success abroad.

== Competition format ==
There are 14 clubs in the Réunion Premier League. During the course of a season, usually from March to November, each club plays the others twice, once at their home stadium and once at that of their opponents, for a total of 26 games. Like all other amateur leagues in France, the league operates using a 4–2–1 points system meaning four points for a win, two for a draw, and one for a defeat. If points are equal following the season, the goal difference and then goals scored determine the winner. If still equal, teams are deemed to occupy the same position. If there is a tie for the championship, for relegation, or for qualification to other competitions, a play-off match at a neutral venue decides rank. The two lowest placed teams are relegated to second division and the top two teams from the second division are promoted in their place.

The Réunionese Football League runs the Coupe de la Réunion, which is the national cup of the territory. The organization also runs a Coupe de France cup competition that is independent to the Coupe de la Réunion. The Coupe de France competition serves as qualifying rounds for the actual Coupe de France. The competition usually lasts six rounds and the winner of the competition qualifies for the 7th round of the Coupe de France.

== Premier League Clubs 2016 ==
Team	Home City	Manager	Stadium	Capacity
AS Marsouins	Saint-Leu		Stade Saint-Leu	1,000
AS Sainte-Suzanne	Sainte-Suzanne			
AJ Petite-Île	Saint-Joseph		Stade Raphaël Babet	2,000
AS Excelsior	Saint-Joseph	(France) Farès Bousdira	Stade Raphaël Babet	2,000
JS Piton Saint-Leu	Saint-Leu			
JS Saint-Pierroise	Saint-Pierre	(France) Patrice Ségura	Stade Michel Volnay	8,000
RC Saint-Benoît	Saint-Benoît			
Saint-Denis FC	Saint-Denis		Stade Jean-Ivoula	7,500
Saint-Pauloise FC	Saint-Paul	(France) Christian Dafreville	Stade Paul Julius Bénard	12,000
SDEFA	Saint-Denis			
SS Capricorne	Saint-Pierre		Stade Joffre-Labenne	
SS Jeanne d'Arc	Le Port		Stade Georges Lambrakis	2,000
SS Saint-Louisienne	Saint-Louis	(France) Patrick Laborde	Stade Théophile Hoarau	2,500
US Sainte-Marienne	Sainte-Marie	(France) Djamel Bendouma	Stade Nelson Mandela	8,000

== Previous winners ==
Season	Num. Clubs	Champion	Pts	Runner-up	Pts
1950	n.c.	Patriote	n.c.	n.c.	n.c.
1951	n.c.	Patriote	n.c.	n.c.	n.c.
1952	n.c.	Jeanne d'Arc	n.c.	n.c.	n.c.
1953	n.c.	Patriote	n.c.	n.c.	n.c.
1954	n.c.	Patriote	n.c.	n.c.	n.c.
1955	n.c.	Patriote	n.c.	n.c.	n.c.
1956	12	Saint-Pierroise	36	Patriote	34
1957	10	Saint-Pierroise	25	Bourbon	22
1958	10	Saint-Louisienne	n/a	Jeanne d'Arc	n/a
1959	16	Saint-Pierroise	33	Charles de Foucauld	33
1960	10	Saint-Pierroise	48	Jeanne d'Arc	41
1961	10	Saint-Pierroise	47	Bourbon	45
1962	7	Patriote	29	Saint-Pierroise	27
1963	8	Saint-Louisienne	36	Saint-Pierroise	34
1964	8	Saint-Louisienne	35	Saint-Pierroise	34
1965	10	Saint-Louisienne	49	Stade Tamponnaise	44
1966	10	Saint-Louisienne	49	Stade Tamponnaise	42
1967	10	Saint-Louisienne	47	Patriote	43
1968	10	Saint-Louisienne	46	Jeanne d'Arc	45
1969	10	Saint-Louisienne	45	Jeanne d'Arc	44
1970	10	Saint-Louisienne	44	Excelsior	44
1971	10	Saint-Pierroise	41	Saint-Louisienne	36
1972	10	Saint-Pierroise	48	Patriote	44
1973	13	Saint-Pierroise	64	Excelsior	60
1974	12	Excelsior	59	Saint-Pierroise	52
1975	12	Saint-Pierroise	53	Excelsior	53
1976	12	Saint-Pierroise	55	Ouest	53
1977	12	Ouest	57	Excelsior	52
1978	12	Saint-Pierroise	56	Saint-Denis	53
1979	12	Saint-Pauloise	59	US Bénédictine	51
1980	12	Saint-Denis	57	Saint-Pauloise	53
1981	12	Saint-Pauloise	55	US Bénédictine	54
1982	12	Saint-Louisienne	52	Saint-Denis	49
1983	12	Saint-Pauloise	51	Ouest	51
1984	13	Saint-Denis	58	Saint-Pauloise	58
1985	14	Saint-Pauloise	64	Saint-Pierroise	63
1986	14	Saint-Pauloise	68	Saint-Denis	65
1987	14	Saint-Denis	64	Saint-Pauloise	64
1988	14	Saint-Louisienne	61	Stade Tamponnaise	60
1989	14	Saint-Pierroise	64	Saint-Denis	60
1990	14	Saint-Pierroise	63	Stade Tamponnaise	60
1991	14	Stade Tamponnaise	67	Saint-Denis	67
1992	12	Stade Tamponnaise	61	Saint-Denis	52
1993	12	Saint-Pierroise	54	Saint-Denis	54
1994	12	Saint-Pierroise	56	Stade Tamponnaise	52
1995	12	Saint-Denis	54	Stade Tamponnaise	51
1996	12	Saint-Denis	53	Saint-Pierroise	53
1997	14	Saint-Louisienne	79	Stade Tamponnaise	73
1998	14	Saint-Louisienne	84	Stade Tamponnaise	81
1999	14	Stade Tamponnaise	86	Saint-Pierroise	78
2000	14	Marsouins	77	Stade Tamponnaise	75
2001	14	Saint-Louisienne	81	Saint-Pierroise	81
2002	14	Saint-Louisienne	89	Stade Tamponnaise	74
2003	14	Stade Tamponnaise	88	Saint-Louisienne	88
2004	14	Stade Tamponnaise	82	Excelsior	78
2005	14	Stade Tamponnaise	88	Excelsior	87
2006	14	Stade Tamponnaise	88	Saint-Pierroise	81
2007	14	Stade Tamponnaise	89	Excelsior	82
2008	14	Saint-Pierroise	88	Stade Tamponnaise	87
2009	14	Stade Tamponnaise	81	Excelsior	70
2010	14	Stade Tamponnaise	79	Sainte-Marienne	74
2011	12	Saint-Pauloise	69	Stade Tamponnaise	65
2012	12	Saint-Louisienne	72	Stade Tamponnaise	67
2013	12	Sainte-Marienne	67	Saint-Pauloise	63
2014	12	Saint-Pauloise	68	Excelsior	66
2015	12	Saint-Pierroise	71	Saint-Louisienne	65
2016–17	14	Saint-Pierroise	92	Sainte-Marienne	78
2017	14	Saint-Pierroise	100	Excelsior	78
2018	14	Saint-Pierroise	85	Jeanne d'Arc	84
2019	14	Saint-Pierroise	86	Sainte-Marienne	82
2020	14	Excelsior	40	CS Saint-Denis	40
2021	16	Stade Tamponnaise	51	Excelsior	48
2022	14	CS Saint-Denis	91	Saint-Pierroise	75
2023	14	Excelsior	87	Saint-Pierroise	85
2024	14	Excelsior	89	Saint-Pauloise	83

=== Performance by club ===
Club	City	Titles	Last title
Saint-Pierroise	Saint-Pierre	21	2019
Saint-Louisienne	Saint-Louis	16	2012
Stade Tamponnaise	Le Tampon	11	2021
Saint-Pauloise	Saint-Paul	7	2014
Patriote	Saint-Denis	6	1962
Saint-Denis	Saint-Denis	6	2022
Excelsior	Saint-Joseph	3	2024
Jeanne d'Arc	Le Port	1	1952
Marsouins	Saint-Leu	1	2000
Ouest	Saint-Paul	1	1977
Sainte-Marienne	Sainte-Marie	1	2013

== Individual statistics ==
=== Top goalscorers ===
Year	Country	Best scorers	Team	Goals
2000	(Mauritius)	Robert Rateau	SS Capricorne	20
2001	(Réunion)	Bernard Lacollay	Marsouins	21
2002	(Algeria)	Farid Kekar	Possession	19
2003	(Réunion)	Willy Robert	Saint-Pauloise	20
2004	(Ivory Coast)	Moussa Traoré	Stade Tamponnaise	14
2005	(Réunion)	Willy Visnelda	Saint-Louisienne	12
2007	(Réunion)	Antoine Rasolofo	Marsouins	19
2008	(Réunion)	Quentin Boesso	Saint-Pierroise	23
2009	(Madagascar)	Britton Mandilimana	Sainte-Marienne	20
2010	(Madagascar)	Praxis Rabemananjara	Saint-Denis	12
2011	(Réunion)	Mohamed El-Madaghri	Stade Tamponnaise	11
2012	(Ivory Coast)	Georges Ba	Saint-Louisienne	9
2013	(Réunion)	Faissal Zaghar	Saint-Louisienne	13
2014	(Réunion)	Quentin Boesso	Saint-Pierroise	13
2015		Fabrice	Sainte-Marienne	14
2016	(Réunion)	Jean-Michel Fontaine	Saint-Pierroise	19
2017	(Réunion)	Jean-Michel Fontaine	Saint-Pierroise	22
2018	(Réunion)	Jean-Michel Fontaine	Saint-Pierroise	20
2019	(Réunion)	Jean-Michel Fontaine	Saint-Pierroise	21
2020	(Réunion)	Pierrick Kéhi	Jeanne d'Arc	9
2021	(Réunion)	Pierrick Kéhi	Jeanne d'Arc	12
2021	(Réunion)	Mohamed El	Excelsior	12
2022	(Réunion)	Mamoudou Diallo	Saint-Denis	25
2023	(Madagascar)	Angelo Andrianantenaina	Excelsior	23
2024	(Réunion)	Jean-Michel Fontaine	La Tamponnaise	22
2025	(Réunion)	Assoumani Akbar	Saint-Denis	19
2026	(Madagascar)	Henri Charles Gladyson	Saint-Benedicte	18

Most time goalscorers

- 5 times.
  - Jean-Michel Fontaine (2016, 2017, 2018, 2019 and 2024)

=== All-times top scorers ===
Rank	Country	Player	Goals	Years
1	(Réunion)	Tsimba Kely Razafitsialonina	243	1982-2002
2	(Réunion)	Jean-Michel Fontaine	220	2006-
3	(Réunion)	Bernard Lacollay	182	-2005
4	(Madagascar)	Henri Charles Gladyson	135	2014
5	(Réunion)	Salomon Kéhi	121	-2009
6	(Réunion)	Quentin Boesso	109	2006

=== All-time appearances ===
Rank	Country	Player	Apps	Years
1	(Réunion)	Jean-Noël Ajorque	457	1994-2017
2	(Réunion)	Johan Lionel	420	2000-2019
3	(Réunion)	Gael Payet	400	2002-2023

=== Multiple hat-tricks ===
Rank	Country	Player	Hat-tricks
1	(Réunion)	Jean-Michel Fontaine	3
2	(Madagascar)	Angelo Andrianantenaina	1
2	(Réunion)	Britton	1
2	(Réunion)	Kamel Chegui	1
2	(Réunion)	Dogbo	1
2	(Réunion)	Jean Pascal Fontaine	1
2	(Madagascar)	Henri Charles Gladyson	1
2	(Réunion)	Dimitri Ornana	1
2	(French Guiana)	Gabriel Pigrée	1
2	(Réunion)	Antoine Rasolofo	1

== Women's League ==
Féminine R1
- Founded: 1979
- Country: Réunion
- Current champions: Saint Pauloise (2025)
- Most championships: Escadrille (8 titles)
- Top scorer: Laury Nangué (151 goals)

=== Top goalscorers ===
Season	Player	Team	Goals
2015	(Réunion) Anita Bluker	Eperon	38
2015-16	(Réunion) Anaelle Grondin	SDEFA	28
2016-17	(Réunion) Laury Nangué	St. Loussienne	48
2017-18	(Réunion) Anais Avara	Possession	13
2026	(Réunion) Marie Chamand	Saint Pauloise	20
