= 2018 Réunion Premier League =

Réunion Premier League
- Season: 2018
- Champions: JS Saint-Pierroise
- Top goalscorer: (Réunion) Jean-Michel Fontaine (20 goals)

The 2018 Réunion Premier League is the 69th season of the Réunion Premier League, the professional league for association football clubs in Réunion, since the league's establishment in 1950. The season started on 17 March and concluded on 16 December 2018.

== Standings ==
Final table.

 1.JS Saint-Pierroise              26  18  5  3  61-13  85  Champions
 2.SS Jeanne d'Arc (Le Port)       26  18  4  4  35-14  84
 3.AS Excelsior (Saint-Joseph)     26  14  6  6  49-22  74
 4.Saint-Denis FC                  26  11  8  7  40-26  67
 5.US Sainte-Marienne              26  10 10  6  27-24  65  [-1]
 6.La Tamponnaise                  26  11  4 11  27-29  63
 7.AS Saint-Louisienne             26   9  8  9  31-35  61
 8.AS MJC Sainte-Suzanne           26   7 11  8  30-30  58
 9.AS Marsouins (Saint-Leu)        26   7  8 11  19-33  55  [2 1 0 1 1 1-1 5]
10.Saint-Pauloise FC               26   8  5 13  27-47  55  [2 1 0 1 1 1-1 5]
11.AF Saint-Louis                  26   7  7 12  19-36  54
 - - - - - - - - - - - - - - - - - - - - - - - - - - - - -
12.SS Capricorne (Saint-Pierre)    26   5 10 11  15-28  51  Relegation Playoff
----------------------------------------------------------
13.AJ Petite-Ile                   26   4  7 15  26-36  45  Relegated
14.OSCA Léopards (Saint-André)     26   4  5 17  22-55  43  Relegated

== Top scorers ==
Rank	Player	Club	Goals
1	(Réunion) Jean-Michel Fontaine	JS Saint-Pierroise	20
2	(Réunion) Ludovic Lagourde	SS Jeanne d'Arc	15
3	(Madagascar) Gladyson Henri	US Sainte-Marienne	13
3	(Madagascar) Fabrice	JS Saint-Pierroise	13
5	(Réunion) Andy Permal	AS Excelsior	11
5	(Réunion) Loïc Rivíere	La Tamponnaise	11
7	(Algeria) Walid Chenine	AS Excelsior	10
7	(France) Redouane Darhri	JS Saint-Pierroise	10
9	(Madagascar) Jeannel	SS Saint-Pauloise	9
9	(Réunion) Florian Turpin	US Sainte-Marienne	9
