= Jean-Michel Fontaine =

Réunionese footballer (born 1988)

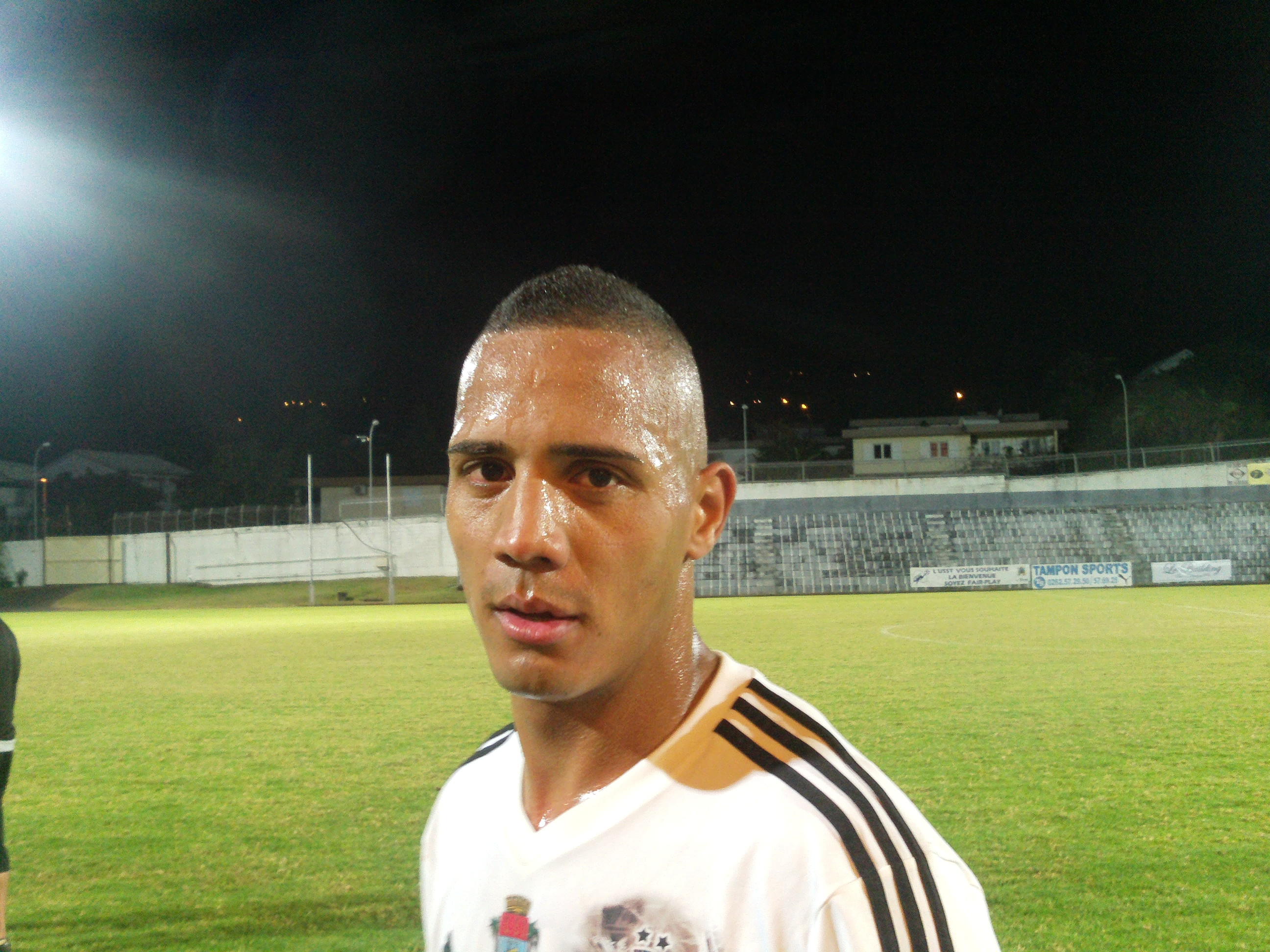
- Fontaine with Saint-Pierroise in 2012

Personal information
- Full name: Jean-Michel Fontaine
- Date of birth: August 28, 1988 (age 38)
- Place of birth: Saint-Pierre, Réunion
- Height: 1.85 m (6 ft 1 in)
- Position: Forward

Team information
- Current team: La Tamponnaise
- Number: 9

Senior career*
Years	Team	Apps	(Gls)
2007–2011	USS Tamponnaise	68	(21)
2012–2013	JS Saint-Pierroise	28	(15)
2013	Fleetwood Town	3	(0)
2013	JS Saint-Pierroise	11	(3)
2014–2015	AS Excelsior	47	(25)
2016–2020	JS Saint-Pierroise	104	(89)
2021–	La Tamponnaise	107	(69)

International career
2007–	Réunion	30	(15)
- * Club domestic league appearances and goals

Jean-Michel Fontaine (born 28 August 1988) is a Réunionese professional footballer who plays as a forward for Réunion Premier League club La Tamponnaise and the Réunion national team.

In February 2013 he joined English club Fleetwood Town, before being released at the end of the season.

Fontaine is Réunion's all-time top scorer.

== Career statistics ==
=== Club ===
Appearances and goals by club, season and competition
Club	Season	League			Cup		Continental		Other		Total	
Club	Season	Division	Apps	Goals	Apps	Goals	Apps	Goals	Apps	Goals	Apps	Goals
La Tamponnaise	2006	Régional 1	5	0							5	0
La Tamponnaise	2007	Régional 1	27	5							27	5
La Tamponnaise	2008	Régional 1	25	4							25	4
La Tamponnaise	2009	Régional 1	24	8							24	8
La Tamponnaise	2010	Régional 1	23	6							23	6
La Tamponnaise	2011	Régional 1	20	10							20	10
La Tamponnaise	Total		124	33							124	33
JS Saint-Pierroise	2012	Régional 1	22	8							22	8
Fleetwood Town	2012–13	EFL League Two	12	0	0	0	—		0	0	12	0
JS Saint-Pierroise	2013	Régional 1	9	2							9	2
Excelsior	2014	Régional 1	21	9							21	9
Excelsior	2015	Régional 1	17	8							17	8
Excelsior	Total		38	17							38	17
JS Saint-Pierroise	2016–17	Régional 1	24	19							24	19
JS Saint-Pierroise	2017	Régional 1	21	22							21	22
JS Saint-Pierroise	2018	Régional 1	24	20							24	20
JS Saint-Pierroise	2019	Régional 1	24	21	1	0					25	21
JS Saint-Pierroise	2020	Régional 1	8	7	4	1					12	8
JS Saint-Pierroise	Total		101	89	5	1					106	90
La Tamponnaise	2021	Régional 1	14	9	1	0					15	9
La Tamponnaise	2022	Régional 1	24	15	1	1					25	16
La Tamponnaise	2023	Régional 1	24	18	4	0					28	18
La Tamponnaise	2024	Régional 1	25	22	1	0					26	22
La Tamponnaise	2025	Régional 1	2	2	2	2					4	4
La Tamponnaise	2026	Régional 1	18	3	3	3					21	6
La Tamponnaise	Total		107	69	12	6					119	75
Career total			421	220	17	7					438	227

=== International ===
As of match played 2 September 2023

Appearances and goals by national team and year
National team	Year	Apps	Goals
Réunion	2007	5	0
Réunion	2008	2	0
Réunion	2010	4	1
Réunion	2011	2	0
Réunion	2012	5	8
Réunion	2015	3	3
Réunion	2019	5	3
Réunion	2023	3	0
Total		29	15

Scores and results list Réunion's goal tally first, score column indicates score after each Fontaine goal.

List of international goals scored by Jean-Michel Fontaine
No.	Date	Venue	Opponent	Score	Result	Competition	Ref.
1	22 September 2010	Parc des Sports Michel Hidalgo, Sannois, France	Saint Pierre and Miquelon	1–0	11–0	2010 Coupe de l'Outre-Mer	
2	15 September 2012	George V Stadium, Curepipe, Mauritius	Mauritius	1–1	1–1	Friendly	
3	22 September 2012	Stade Montbauron, Versailles, France	French Guiana	1–0	2–0	2012 Coupe de l'Outre-Mer	
4	24 September 2012	Stade Bauer, Saint-Ouen-sur-Seine, France	Saint Pierre and Miquelon	8–0	10–0	2012 Coupe de l'Outre-Mer	
5	24 September 2012	Stade Bauer, Saint-Ouen-sur-Seine, France	Saint Pierre and Miquelon	9–0	10–0	2012 Coupe de l'Outre-Mer	
6	24 September 2012	Stade Bauer, Saint-Ouen-sur-Seine, France	Saint Pierre and Miquelon	10–0	10–0	2012 Coupe de l'Outre-Mer	
7	26 September 2012	Stade Jean Rolland, Franconville, France	Guadeloupe	1–0	2–1	2012 Coupe de l'Outre-Mer	
8	26 September 2012	Stade Jean Rolland, Franconville, France	Guadeloupe	2–1	2–1	2012 Coupe de l'Outre-Mer	
9	29 September 2012	Parc des Sports Michel Hidalgo, Sannois, France	Martinique	1–1	2–2	2012 Coupe de l'Outre-Mer	
10	31 July 2015	Stade Michel Volnay, Saint-Pierre, Réunion	Mauritius	1–0	1–0	2015 Indian Ocean Island Games	
11	8 August 2015	Stade Jean-Ivoula, Saint-Denis, Réunion	Mayotte	1–0	3–1	2015 Indian Ocean Island Games	
12	8 August 2015	Stade Jean-Ivoula, Saint-Denis, Réunion	Mayotte	2–0	3–1	2015 Indian Ocean Island Games	
13	18 July 2019	Stade Auguste Vollaire, Centre de Flacq, Mauritius	Maldives	2–0	4–0	2019 Indian Ocean Island Games	
14	18 July 2019	Stade Auguste Vollaire, Centre de Flacq, Mauritius	Maldives	4–0	4–0	2019 Indian Ocean Island Games	
15	28 July 2019	Stade Auguste Vollaire, Centre de Flacq, Mauritius	Mauritius	1–0	1–1	2019 Indian Ocean Island Games	

== See also ==
- List of top international men's football goalscorers by country
