= 2019 Réunion Premier League =

Réunion Premier League
- Season: 2019
- Champions: JS Saint-Pierroise
- Top goalscorer: (Réunion) Jean-Michel Fontaine (21 goals)

The 2019 Réunion Premier League is the 70th season of the Réunion Premier League, the professional league for association football clubs in Réunion, since the league's establishment in 1950. The season started on 17 March 2019.

== Standings ==
Final table.

 1.JS Saint-Pierroise              26  18  6  2  48-17  86                         Champions
 2.US Sainte-Marienne              26  17  5  4  46-24  82
 3.Saint-Denis FC                  26  14  7  5  43-24  75
 4.AS Excelsior (Saint-Joseph)     26  15  3  8  42-27  74
 5.La Tamponnaise                  26  10 12  4  42-26  68
 6.SS Jeanne d'Arc (Le Port)       26  11  7  8  43-30  66
 7.Trois Bassins FC                26  10  6 10  35-42  62
 8.SS Capricorne (Saint-Pierre)    26   8  9  9  26-31  59
 9.Saint-Pauloise FC               26   7  5 14  22-41  52
10.SDEFA                           26   7  4 15  23-46  51  [2 1 0 1 4-3 5]
11.AF Saint-Louis                  26   6  7 13  26-42  51  [2 1 0 1 3-4 5]
 - - - - - - - - - - - - - - - - - - - - - - - - - - - - -
12.AS Marsouins (Saint-Leu)        26   5  6 15  25-38  46  [-1]                   Relegation Playoff
----------------------------------------------------------
13.AS Saint-Louisienne             26   5  4 17  31-51  45  [2 1 0 1 2-2 5; 1 ag]  Relegated
14.AS MJC Sainte-Suzanne           26   2 13 11  21-34  45  [2 1 0 1 2-2 5; 0 ag]  Relegated

== Top scorers ==
Rank	Player	Club	Goals
1	(Réunion) Jean-Michel Fontaine	JS Saint-Pierroise	21
2	(Réunion) Mohamed El	AS Saint-Louisienne	15
2	(Madagascar) Gladyson Henri	US Sainte-Marienne	15
4	(Réunion) Sylvain Phileas	La Tamponnaise	13
5	(Réunion) Akbar Assoumani	Saint-Denis FC	10
5	(Réunion) Quentin Boesso	SS Capricorne	10
7	(Madagascar) Angelo	Saint-Denis FC	9
8	(Comoros) Issa Nazarali	Trois Bassins	8
8	(Réunion) Loïc Rivíere	La Tamponnaise	8
10	(France) Elliot Grandin	JS Saint-Pierroise	7
