= Henri Charles Gladyson =

Malagasy footballer

Personal information
- Date of birth: 26 April 1989 (age 37)
- Place of birth: Antananarivo, Madagascar
- Height: 1.85 m (6 ft 1 in)
- Position: Striker

Team information
- Current team: Jeanne d'Arc

Senior career*
Years	Team	Apps	(Gls)
2011–2012	CNaPS Sport		
2013	St Michel United		
2014	La Tamponnaise		
2014	JS Saint-Pierroise		
2015–2017	Sainte-Marienne		
2018	Excesior	10	(4)
2018–2020	Sainte-Marienne	36	(24)
2020	AS Sainte-Suzanne		
2021	Excesior	11	(5)
2022	AS Sainte-Suzanne		
2022–	Jeanne d'Arc	36	(24)

International career^{‡}
2014–2021	Madagascar	4	(0)
- * Club domestic league appearances and goals as of 20:44, 7 July 2024 (UTC) ‡ National team caps and goals as of 20:44, 7 July 2024 (UTC)

Henri Charles Gladyson (born 26 April 1989) is a Malagasy international footballer who plays for Jeanne d'Arc as a forward.

== Career ==
Born in Antananarivo, has played club football for CNaPS Sport, St Michel United, La Tamponnaise, JS Saint-Pierroise, Sainte-Marienne, Excesior, AS Sainte-Suzanne and Jeanne d'Arc.

He made his international debut for Madagascar in 2014.
