= 2007–08 Tahiti Ligue 2 =

Tournament details
- Country: Tahiti
- Teams: 12

Final positions
- Champions: AS Vaiete
- Runners-up: AS Excelsior
- All statistics correct as of 2021-05-07.

The 2007–08 Tahiti Ligue 2 was the second highest division of the Tahitian football league. The competition is organized and administered by Fédération Tahitienne de Football.

== Participating teams ==
In 2007–08 edition of the competition, 12 teams participated.

AS Vaiete, AS Excelsior, AS Punaruu, AS Vénus, AS Papenoo, AS Vairao, AS Roniu, AS Olympic Mahina, AS Papara, AS Vaiarii Nui, AS Vaiotaha and AS Hitia'a.

== Final classification ==
Table:

1.AS Vaiete           22  17  3  2  72-21  59  Promoted
2.AS Excelsior        22  15  4  3  76-23  56  Promoted

3.AS Punaruu          22  12  6  4  58-21  52
4.AS Vénus            22  11  7  4  61-24  51
5.AS Papenoo          22  12  4  6  49-35  50
6.AS Vairao           22  10  5  7  42-21  47
7.AS Roniu            22   9  4  9  44-31  44
8.AS Olympic Mahina   22   8  4 10  52-40  42
9.AS Papara           21   6  4 11  45-52  35  [-2]
10.AS Vaiarii Nui      22   3  4 15  27-65  31  [-1]

11.AS Vaiotaha         22   2  3 17  26-96  29  Relegated
12.AS Hitia'a          21   2  0 19  26-149 25  Relegated

NB: points system changed from 4-2-1 to 3-2-1

== Round 1 ==
[Sep 16]

Vaiarii Nui 0-4 Vairao

Roniu 3-1 Excelsior

Papenoo 1-4 Punaruu

Ol. Mahina 0-3 Vénus

Vaiete 3-1 Hitia'a

Vaiotaha 1-4 Papara

== Round 2 ==
[Sep 22,23]

Excelsior 3-0 Vairao

Vénus 2-2 Punaruu

Hitia'a 1-6 Ol. Mahina

Papenoo 3-0 Roniu

Vaiarii Nui awd Papara

           [awarded 0-3, originally 3-2]

[date?] Vaiotaha 0-5 Vaiete

== Round 3 ==
[Oct 5]

Punaruu 1-0 Excelsior

[Oct 7]

Vaiete 2-2 Vénus

Ol. Mahina 1-2 Papenoo

Roniu 2-2 Vaiarii Nui

Papara 0-2 Vairoa

Hitia'a 3-2 Vaiotaha

== Round 4 ==
[Oct 12]

Vénus 12-0 Hitia'a

Excelsior 3-1 Ol. Mahina

[Oct 14]

Papara 2-1 Roniu

Vaiarii Nui 0-4 Punaruu

Papenoo 1-2 Vaiete

[date?]

Vaiotaha 1-4 Vairao

== Round 5 ==
[Oct 26]

Vénus 2-1 Vaiotaha

Punaruu 2-2 Papara

[Oct 28]

Hitia'a 1-2 Papenoo

Vaiete 4-1 Excelsior

Ol. Mahina 0-0 Vaiarii Nui

Roniu 0-0 Vairao

== Round 6 ==
[Nov 2]

Punaruu 1-0 Vairoa

Excelsior 6-1 Hitia'a

[Nov 4]

Papara 3-3 Ol. Mahina

Vaiarii Nui 2-4 Vaiete

Papenoo 3-3 Vénus

Vaiotaha 0-0 Roniu

== Round 7 ==
[Nov 16]

Vénus 0-2 Excelsior

Punaruu 0-2 Roniu

[Nov 18]

Hitia'a 4-3 Vaiarii Nui

Vaiete 4-0 Papara

Ol. Mahina 2-1 Vairao

Papenoo 3-3 Vaiotaha

== Round 8 ==
[Nov 25]

Papara 1-4 Excelsior

Papenoo 3-2 Vairao

Roniu 2-1 Vénus

Hitia'a 1-4 Punaruu

Ol. Mahina 0-1 Vaiete

Vaiotaha 1-2 Vaiarii Nui

Round 9

[Dec 7]

Excelsior 2-2 Papenoo

Punaruu 6-1 Vaiotaha

[Dec 9]

Vaiete 1-1 Vairao

Ol. Mahina 2-1 Roniu

[Jan 25]

Vénus 4-1 Vaiarii Nui

[Jun 1]

Hitia'a - Papara

== Round 10 ==
[Dec 14]

Vénus 3-1 Papara

Excelsior 7-1 Vaiotaha

[Dec 16]

Papenoo 6-0 Vaiarii Nui

Hitia'a 1-5 Vairao

Roniu 0-1 Vaiete

Ol. Mahina 2-2 Punaruu

== Round 11 ==
[Jan 11]

Vénus 1-1 Vairao

[Jan 13]

Papara 3-5 Papenoo

Vaiarii Nui 1-2 Excelsior

Vaiotaha 0-5 Ol. Mahina

Vaiete 2-0 Punaruu

Hitia'a 1-14 Roniu

== Round 12 ==
[Jan 18]

Excelsior 1-0 Roniu

Punaruu 3-1 Papenoo

Vénus 3-1 Ol. Mahina

[Jan 20]

Hitia'a 2-8 Vaiete

Papara awd Vaiotaha [awarded 0-3, originally 5-1]

Vairao 2-2 Vaiarii Nui [award of 0-3 revoked]

== Round 13 ==
[Feb 1]

Vénus 0-0 Punaruu

[Feb 3]

Roniu 1-2 Papenoo

Vairao 0-2 Excelsior

Papara awd Vaiarii Nui [awarded 0-3, originally 3-2]

Vaiete 12-0 Vaiotaha

Ol. Mahina 7-1 Hitia'a

== Round 14 ==
[Feb 15-17]

Vénus 0-0 Vaiete

Excelsior 1-1 Punaruu

Vaiarii Nui 1-3 Roniu

Vairao 0-1 Papara

Vaiotaha 3-2 Hitia'a

Papenoo 2-1 Ol. Mahina

== Round 15 ==
[Feb 22-24]

Punaruu 5-0 Vaiarii Nui

Ol. Mahina 1-1 Excelsior

Vaiete 4-1 Papenoo

Hitia'a 0-5 Vénus

Vairao 6-0 Vaiotaha

Roniu 1-2 Papara

== Round 16 ==
[Feb 29]

Excelsior 1-0 Vaiete

[Mar 2]

Vaiarii Nui 1-7 Ol. Mahina

Papara 2-2 Punaruu

Vairao 0-0 Roniu

Vaiotaha 1-10 Vénus

Papenoo 6-0 Hitia'a

== Round 17 ==
[Mar 13]

Vairao 1-0 Punaruu [Mar 14] Vénus 0-1 Papenoo

[Mar 16]

Vaiete 5-1 Vaiarii Nui

Hitia'a 1-17 Excelsior

Roniu 1-0 Vaiotaha

Ol. Mahina 2-0 Papara

== Round 18 ==
[Mar 27-30]

Excelsior 2-2 Vénus

Roniu 2-1 Punaruu

Vaiarii Nui 7-3 Hitia'a

Papara 3-6 Vaiete

Vairao 3-1 Ol. Mahina

Vaiotaha 2-3 Papenoo

Round 19 [Apr 11-14]

Punaruu 10-0 Hitia'a

Excelsior 6-1 Papara

Vénus 5-0 Roniu

Vairao 1-0 Papenoo

Vaiete 3-2 Ol. Mahina

Vaiarii Nui 1-1 Vaiotaha

== Round 20 ==
[Apr 24]

Roniu 2-1 Ol. Mahina [Apr 27] Vaiotaha 0-4 Punaruu

Vairao abd Vaiete [abandoned at 0-0 in 2nd half]

[May 23]

Vairao 1-2 Vaiete [replay]

[May 23?]

Vaiarii Nui 0-1 Vénus

[May 25]

Papenoo 0-1 Excelsior

Papara 15-1 Hitia'a

== Round 21 ==
[May 9]

Punaruu 4-1 Ol. Mahina

Vaiotaha 2-10 Excelsior

Vaiarii Nui 0-1 Papenoo

Papara 1-2 Vénus

Vairao 5-0 Hitia'a

Vaiete 3-0 Roniu

Round 22 [May 14?]

Roniu 9-2 Hitia'a

[May 16]

Punaruu 2-0 Vaiete

Excelsior 3-0 Vaiarii Nui

Ol. Mahina 6-3 Vaiotaha

Vairao 3-0 Vénus

Papenoo 1-1 Papara
