= Mansour Boutabout =

Algerian footballer (born 1978)

Personal information
- Date of birth: 20 September 1978 (age 48)
- Place of birth: Le Creusot, France
- Height: 1.84 m (6 ft 0 in)
- Position: Forward

Youth career
- Gueugnon

Senior career*
Years	Team	Apps	(Gls)
1996–2002	Gueugnon	14	(0)
2002–2003	FC Sète	31	(16)
2003–2004	Gueugnon	35	(12)
2004–2005	Le Mans	24	(1)
2005	Gueugnon	1	(1)
2005–2006	→ Sedan (loan)	36	(12)
2006–2008	Sedan	51	(8)
2008	Angers	8	(0)
2008–2009	K.V. Kortrijk	2	(0)
2010	USM Blida	3	(0)
2011–2012	Excelsior	30	(14)
2013–2015	Rodez	71	(20)
2015–2016	US Colomiers	12	(0)
Total		320	(84)

International career
2003–2008	Algeria	22	(6)
- * Club domestic league appearances and goals

Mansour Boutabout (Arabic: منصور بوتابوت; born 20 September 1978) is a former professional footballer who played as a forward. Born in France, he spent most of his career there while representing the Algeria national team at international level.

== Club career ==
Boutabout was born in Le Creusot, France.

In February 2010 he signed for USM Blida from Belgian club K.V. Kortrijk and spent a season there. After receiving a contract offer from Championnat National side UJA Alfortville he trialled a few weeks with reigning Scottish Premier League champions Rangers upon the invitation of compatriot Madjid Bougherra.

On 14 March 2011, it was announced that Boutabout had joined Réunion-club AS Excelsior. where he joined up with Algerian coach Farès Bousdira.

== International career ==
Boutabout received his first call-up to the Algeria national team for a 2006 FIFA World Cup qualifier against Niger on 11 October 2003. He started the game and scored its only goal in the 62nd minute. A month later, he scored another two goals in the 6–0 win in the return leg against Niger.

Boutabout was subsequently called up to be part of the 2004 African Cup of Nations in Tunisia where he started three games in the competition without scoring a goal before the team lost in the quarter-finals to Morocco.

Boutabout's last cap came on 26 March 2008, in a friendly against DR Congo.

== Career statistics ==
Appearances and goals by national team and year
National team	Year	Apps	Goals
Algeria	2003	2	3
Algeria	2004	7	0
Algeria	2005	6	3
Algeria	2006	4	0
Algeria	2007	2	0
Algeria	2008	1	0
Total		22	6

Scores and results list Algeria's goal tally first, score column indicates score after each Boutabout goal.

List of international goals scored by Mansour Boutabout
No.	Date	Venue	Opponent	Score	Result	Competition
1	11 October 2003	Stade Général Seyni Kountché, Niger	Niger	1–0	1–0	2006 FIFA World Cup qualification
2	14 November 2003	Stade 5 Juillet 1962, Algiers, Algeria	Niger	3–0	6–0	2006 FIFA World Cup qualification
3	14 November 2003	Stade 5 Juillet 1962, Algiers, Algeria	Niger	5–0	6–0	2006 FIFA World Cup qualification
4	27 March 2005	Stade Ahmed Zabana, Oran, Algeria	Rwanda	1–0	1–0	2006 FIFA World Cup qualification
5	5 June 2005	Estádio da Cidadela, Angola	Angola	1–2	1–2	2006 FIFA World Cup qualification
6	4 September 2005	Stade Ahmed Zabana, Oran, Algeria	Nigeria	2–2	2–5	2006 FIFA World Cup qualification
