= Robert Rateau =

Mauritian footballer

Personal information
- Full name: Robert Rateau
- Date of birth: 8 June 1975 (age 51)
- Place of birth: Mauritius
- Position: Striker

Senior career*
Years	Team	Apps	(Gls)
1992–1993	Curepipe Cosmos		
1999–2004	Capricorne Saint-Pierre	64+	(46+)
2002	→ AS Excelsior (loan)	25	(11)
2005	Les Avirons	25	(6)
Total		136+	(60+)

International career
1994–2003	Mauritius	23	(5)
- * Club domestic league appearances and goals

Robert Rateau (born 8 June 1975) is a Mauritian former international footballer who played as a striker. He won 23 caps and scored 5 goals for the Mauritius national football team.
