= FC Avirons =

Association football club in Réunion

- Full name: FC Avirons
- Founded: 1957
- Ground: Stade Paulo Brabant; Les Avirons, Réunion Island
- Capacity: 1,000
- Chairman: Alix Cuvelier
- Manager: Fabien Schneider
- League: Réunion Premier League
- 2011: 8th
Home colours

FC Avirons is a football (soccer) club from Les Avirons, Réunion Island.

== Managers ==
- Arsène Ablancourt (?-2003)
- (Algeria) (France) Fares Bousdira (2004)
- (France) Gerard Di Rollo (2006–07)
- (France) Fabien Schneider (2009–)
