= Coupe de la Réunion =

Knockout football tournament on Réunion

The Coupe de la Réunion is the top knockout tournament of the Réunion football. It was created in 1957. This competition is not to be confused with the Coupe régionale de France de la Réunion, the winner of which qualifies for the 7th round of the Coupe de France.

== Winners ==
- 1957 : Bourbon Club 3–2 SS Franco
- 1958 : SS Jeanne d'Arc (Le Port) 3–0 SS Juniors Dionysiens
- 1959 : JS Saint-Pierroise 5–1 SS Escadrille
- 1960 : SS Jeanne d'Arc (Le Port) 2–1 JS Saint Pierroise
- 1961 : SS Patriote (Saint-Denis) 5–2 Bourbon Club
- 1962 : JS Saint-Pierroise 5–1 SS Saint-Louisienne
- 1963 : US Bénédictine 3–1 Stade Saint Paulois
- 1964 : SS Saint-Louisienne 4–2 US Bénédictine
- 1965 : Not played
- 1966 : SS Patriote (Saint-Denis) 2–1 Bourbon Club
- 1967 : SS Jeanne d'Arc (Le Port) 2–1 SS Patriote (Saint-Denis)
- 1968 : SS Saint-Louisienne 4–3 SS Jeanne d'Arc
- 1969 : SS Saint-Louisienne 5–1 US Saint Joseph
- 1970 : SS Saint-Louisienne 1–1 (4–0 in replay) CS Saint-Denis
- 1971 : JS Saint-Pierroise 1–0 SS Patriote (Saint-Denis)
- 1972 : US Bénédictine 3–1 SS Saint-Louisienne
- 1973 : SS Patriote (Saint-Denis) 2–1 JS Saint Pierroise
- 1974 : CS Saint-Denis 4–1 SS Jeunesse Musulmane
- 1975 : CS Saint-Denis 3–0 Olympique Dionysiens (Saint-Denis)
- 1976 : SS Patriote (Saint-Denis) 2–1 CS Saint Denis
- 1977 : CS Saint-Denis 3–1 JS Saint Pierroise
- 1978 : CS Saint-Denis 4–1 SS Saint Louisienne
- 1979 : CS Saint-Denis 1–0 Rivière Sport
- 1980 : JS Saint-Pierroise 1–0 AS Poussins
- 1981 : SS Saint-Louisienne 2–0 SS Saint-Pauloise
- 1982 : US Saint-André Léopards 1–0 CS Saint-Denis
- 1983 : FC Ouest (Saint-Paul) 2–1 CS Saint-Denis
- 1984 : JS Saint-Pierroise 4–1 SS Patriote (Saint-Denis)
- 1985 : CS Saint-Denis 3–1 SS Saint-Pauloise
- 1986 : CS Saint-Denis 1–0 SS Saint-Pauloise
- 1987 : SS Saint-Louisienne 2–1 JS Saint Pierroise
- 1988 : CS Saint-Denis 3–1 SS Gauloise
- 1989 : JS Saint-Pierroise 2–1 CS Saint-Denis
- 1990 : SS Patriote (Saint-Denis) 4–2 JS Saint Pierroise
- 1991 : US Stade Tamponnaise 1–0 SS Saint-Pauloise
- 1992 : JS Saint-Pierroise 1–0 SS Saint-Louisienne
- 1993 : JS Saint-Pierroise 3–1 US Stade Tamponnaise
- 1994 : JS Saint-Pierroise 3–0 US Saint-Andréenne
- 1995 : SS Saint-Louisienne 1–0 CS Saint-Denis
- 1996 : SS Saint-Louisienne 4–1 US Stade Tamponnaise
- 1997 : AS Marsouins (Saint-Leu) 2–2 JS Saint Pierroise (aet, 5–4 pen)
- 1998 : SS Saint-Louisienne 1–0 AS Marsouins (Saint-Leu)
- 1999 : SS Saint-Louisienne 1–1 (3–1 in replay) US Stade Tamponnaise
- 2000 : US Stade Tamponnaise 1–0 SS Excelsior (Saint-Joseph)
- 2001 : SS Jeanne d'Arc (Le Port) 1–0 SS Excelsior (Saint-Joseph)
- 2002 : SS Saint-Louisienne 3–2 JS Saint-Pierroise
- 2003 : US Stade Tamponnaise 2–1 SS Saint-Louisienne
- 2004 : SS Excelsior (Saint-Joseph) 2–1 US Stade Tamponnaise
- 2005 : SS Excelsior (Saint-Joseph) 3–2 Saint-Denis
- 2006 : Saint-Pauloise (Saint-Paul) 2–0 SS Excelsior
- 2007 : AS Marsouins 2–1 US Stade Tamponnaise
- 2008 : US Stade Tamponnaise 1–0 SS Excelsior
- 2009 : US Stade Tamponnaise 2–0 SS Jeanne d'Arc
- 2010 : US Sainte-Marienne 1–0 US Stade Tamponnaise
- 2011 : Saint-Pauloise (Saint-Paul) 1–0 (aet) SS Saint-Louisienne
- 2012 : US Stade Tamponnaise 1–0 Saint-Denis
- 2013 : SS Saint-Louisienne 2–1 JS Saint-Pierroise
- 2014 : SS Excelsior (Saint-Joseph) 4–0 Saint-Pauloise
- 2015 : SS Excelsior (Saint-Joseph) 2–0 JS Saint-Pierroise
- 2016–17 : AS Sainte-Suzanne 1–1 (aet, 5–3 pen.) AS Marsouins
- 2018 : JS Saint-Pierroise 1–0 SS Excelsior
- 2019 : JS Saint-Pierroise 1–0 SS Jeanne d'Arc
- 2020 : Not played
- 2021 : AS Saint-Louisienne 6–3 JS Sainte-Annoise
- 2022 : JS Saint-Pierroise 2–1 Trois Bassins
- 2023 : JS Saint-Pierroise 2–1 Saint-Pauloise
- 2024 : SS Excelsior (Saint-Joseph) 0–0 La Tamponnaise (aet, 5–4 pen)
- 2025 : SS Jeanne d'Arc 1–3 JS Saint-Pierroise

== Performance by club ==
Club	Winners	Winning years
SS Saint-Louisienne	13	
JS Saint-Pierroise	13	
CS Saint-Denis	8	
US Stade Tamponnaise	6	
SS Patriote	5	
SS Excelsior	5	
SS Jeanne d'Arc	5	
US Bénédictine	2	
AS Marsouins	2	
Saint-Pauloise FC	2	
Bourbon Club	1	
US Saint André	1	
FC Ouest	1	
AS Sainte-Suzanne	1	
