= Lionel Djebi-Zadi =

French footballer (born 1982)

Lionel Djebi Zadi
Personal information
- Full name: Lionel Landry Djebi-Zadi
- Date of birth: 20 May 1982 (age 44)
- Place of birth: Lyon, France
- Position: Defender

Youth career
- Guingamp

Senior career*
Years	Team	Apps	(Gls)
2001–2002	Vénissieux		
2002–2005	FC Luzern	4	(0)
2005–2006	Ross County	43	(1)
2006–2007	SC Paderborn	0	(0)
2007	→ SV Wilhelmshaven (loan)	13	(0)
2008	SC Verl	15	(0)
2008–2010	Inverness Caledonian Thistle	26	(0)
2011–2014	SS Saint-Louisienne		
2015–2016	US Sainte-Marienne		
- * Club domestic league appearances and goals

Lionel Landry Djebi-Zadi (born 20 May 1982) is a French former professional footballer who played as a defender.

== Career ==
Djebi-Zadi was born in Lyon. His previous clubs include SC Verl in Germany along with a string of lower league clubs in France, Switzerland and Germany.

He signed for Ross County in 2005. He scored his first and what turned out to be only goal in Scottish football in a 3–3 draw with Brechin City whilst playing for Ross County.

Djebi-Zadi went on trial at Inverness Caledonian Thistle in May 2008 and was offered a one-year contract at the end of the season which he signed on 1 July. On 14 January 2009, Djebi-Zadi was told he was free to leave the club on loan, but made his starting debut for Caley on Terry Butcher's first game against Celtic creating speculation he could be a big player for the rest of the season. He signed a new one-year contract after impressing Butcher with his performances during the run in to the season. He struggled to hold down a regular place in the side and was released at the end of the 2009–10 season after his contract expired.

After a period without a club, Djebi-Zadi signed in 2011 for Saint Louisienne on the Indian Ocean island of La Reunion.

In October 2012 he had an unsuccessful trial with Indonesian club Sriwijaya.
