= SS Rivière Sport =

Association football club in Réunion

Rivière Sport
- Full name: SS Rivière Sport
- Founded: 1957
- Ground: Stade Ludovic Viadère; La Rivière, Réunion Island
- Chairman: Aldo Fontaine
- Manager: Abdi Akki
- League: Réunion Premier League
Home colours

SS Rivière Sport is a football (soccer) club from La Rivière, Réunion.

== Squad ==
Note: Flags indicate national team as defined under FIFA eligibility rules; some limited exceptions apply. Players may hold more than one non-FIFA nationality.

No.	Pos.	Nation	Player
—	GK		Idriss Valérie
—	GK		Medhy Augerai
—	DF	MAD	Edmond Nahoda Robert
—	DF		Jimmy Hoarau
—	DF		Christophe Bello
—	DF		Mathieu Boyer
—	DF		David Fontaine
—	DF		Bertrand Angama
—	DF		Jonathan Fontaine
—	DF		Manuel Rousseau
—	DF		Juldérick Cillon

No.	Pos.	Nation	Player
—	MF		Yannis Kondoki
—	MF		Yohann Dijoux
—	MF		Jérôme Fontaine
—	MF	REU	Pascal Viadère
—	MF		Alix Cillon
—	MF		René-Yves
—	FW		Patrick Laiton
—	FW		Ricky Mohamed
—	FW		Laurent Miranda
—	FW		Jonathan Dolphin
—	FW		Jonathan Angama
