= Stade Georges Lambrakis =

Stadium in Réunion, France

Coordinates: 20.9329°S 55.3012°E

Stade Georges Lambrakis is a multi-use stadium in Le Port, Réunion. It is currently used mostly for football matches and serves as the home stadium for SS Jeanne d'Arc. The stadium holds 2,000 people.
