= 2017 Réunion Premier League =

Réunion Premier League
- Season: 2017
- Champions: JS Saint-Pierroise

The 2017 Réunion Premier League was the 68th season of the Réunion Premier League, the professional league for association football clubs in Réunion, since the league's establishment in 1950. The season started on 14 July and concluded on 17 December 2017.

== Standings ==
2024 Réunion Premier League Standings
Rank	Team	Pld	W	D	L	GF	GA	GD	Pts	Notes
1	JS Saint-Pierroise	26	24	2	0	68	7	+61	100	Champions
2	AS Excelsior (Saint-Joseph)	26	15	7	4	51	23	+28	78	
3	US Sainte-Marienne	26	13	10	3	41	22	+19	75	
4	Saint-Denis FC	26	11	5	10	38	35	+3	64	
5	SS Jeanne d'Arc (Le Port)	26	10	5	11	31	26	+5	61	
6	OSCA Léopards (Saint-André)	26	8	8	10	32	35	-3	58	
7	AS Marsouins (Saint-Leu)	26	8	7	11	26	50	-24	57	
8	SS Saint-Louisienne	26	8	6	12	27	34	-7	56	[4 2 1 1 5-4 11]
9	AS MJC Sainte-Suzanne	26	8	6	12	23	32	-9	56	[4 2 1 1 4-3 11]
10	AJ Petite-Ile	26	9	3	14	32	39	-7	56	[4 1 0 3 4-6 7]
11	Saint-Pauloise FC	26	9	2	15	33	44	-11	55	
Relegation playoff zone
12	SDEFA (Saint-Denis)	26	6	8	12	22	42	-20	52	Relegation Playoff [4 3 1 0 5-1 14]
Relegation zone
13	Trois-Bassins FC	26	8	2	16	27	48	-21	52	Relegated [4 2 0 2 4-5 10]
14	ASC Grands Bois (Saint-Pierre)	26	7	5	14	24	38	-14	52	Relegated [4 0 1 3 1-4 5]
