= 2016–17 Réunion Premier League =

Réunion Premier League
- Season: 2016–17
- Champions: JS Saint-Pierroise

The 2016–17 Réunion Premier League was the 67th season of the Réunion Premier League, the professional league for association football clubs in Réunion, since the league's establishment in 1950. The season started on 23 April 2016 and concluded on 16 April 2017.

== Standings ==
 1.JS Saint-Pierroise              26  21  3  2  66-17  92  Champions
 2.US Sainte-Marienne              26  16  4  6  55-27  78
 3.SS Jeanne d'Arc (Le Port)       26  13  6  7  51-36  71
 4.SS Saint-Louisienne             26  11 10  5  40-33  69
 5.AS Excelsior (Saint-Joseph)     26  11  9  6  36-21  68
 6.AJ Petite-Ile                   26  10  5 11  34-33  61
 7.Saint-Denis FC                  26   9  8  9  34-35  61
 8.AS Marsouins (Saint-Leu)        26   8  7 11  30-37  57
 9.Saint-Pauloise FC               26   9  3 14  40-53  56
10.AS MJC Sainte-Suzanne           26   6 11  9  28-43  55
11.RC Saint-Benoît                 26   7  7 12  24-32  54  Demoted
12.SDEFA (Saint-Denis)             26   6  8 12  21-31  52
----------------------------------------------------------
13.SS Capricorne (Saint-Pierre)    26   5 10 11  31-44  51  Relegated
14.JS Piton Saint-Leu              26   2  5 19  12-60  37  Relegated
