= Jean-Pierre Bade =

French footballer (born 1960)

Personal information
- Date of birth: 18 March 1960 (age 66)
- Place of birth: Saint-Louis, Réunion
- Position: Defender

Team information
- Current team: US Stade Tamponnaise (manager)

Youth career
- SS Saint-Louisienne
- Red Star 93

Senior career*
Years	Team	Apps	(Gls)
1978–1984	Lens		
1984–1987	Marseille	122	(1)
1987–1988	Nantes		
1988–1989	Strasbourg		
1989–1990	Racing Paris		
1990–1992	Bordeaux		

Managerial career
- SS Saint-Louisienne
- JS Saint-Pierroise
- 2005–2008: US Stade Tamponnaise
- 2009–2013: SS Saint-Louisienne
- 2009–2025: Réunion
- 2014–: JS Saint-Pierroise
- * Club domestic league appearances and goals

Jean-Pierre Bade (born 18 March 1960) is a French retired football player who played with Lens, Marseille, Nantes, Strasbourg, Racing Paris and Bordeaux.

After retitiring as a player, Bade has managed a number of clubs in Réunion, including SS Saint-Louisienne and JS Saint-Pierroise. He currently manages US Stade Tamponnaise.
