= Stade Raphaël Babet =

Sports stadium in Réunion, France

Coordinates: 21.3781°S 55.6144°E

Stade Raphaël Babet is a multi-use stadium in Saint-Joseph, Réunion. It is used mostly for soccer matches and is the home stadium for AS Excelsior. The stadium holds 1,130 people.
