= ASC Emulation =

- Full name: Association Sportive et Culturelle Emulation
- Founded: 1941
- Ground: Stade Municipal Victor Schœlcher, Schœlcher, Martinique
- Capacity: 1,000
- League: Martinique Promotion d'Honneur
- 2025-26: 14th (Relegated)

Association Sportive et Culturelle Emulation is a professional football club of Martinique, based in the town of Schœlcher.

They play in the Martinique's second division, the Martinique Promotion d'Honneur
