= AS New Club =

- Full name: Association Sportive New Club
- Founded: 1948
- Ground: Stade Hermann Panzo, Petit-Bourg, Martinique
- Chairman: Luciano Florimond
- Manager: Alain Jean
- League: Martinique Championnat National
Home colours

Association Sportive New Club is a football club based in Petit-Bourg, Martinique. Founded in 1948, the club plays in the Martinique Championnat National, and plays its home matches at Stade Hermann Panzo.
