= Farès Bousdira =

French footballer (born 1953)

Personal information
- Date of birth: 20 September 1953 (age 73)
- Place of birth: Taher, French Algeria
- Height: 1.74 m (5 ft 9 in)
- Position: Midfielder

Team information
- Current team: AS Excelsior (Head coach)

Youth career
- 1970–1971: ASPTT Arras

Senior career*
Years	Team	Apps	(Gls)
1971–1978	Lens	269	(53)
1978–1980	Nice	67	(11)
1980–1981	Angers	52	(17)
1982–1985	Rennes	109	(39)
1985–1986	Béziers	31	(5)
1986–1987	Montceau	31	(11)
1987–1988	Bourges	48	(18)
1988–1992	Saint-Denis		

International career
1976	France	1	(0)

Managerial career
- 2009–: AS Excelsior
- * Club domestic league appearances and goals

Farès Bousdira (born 20 September 1953) is a French former professional footballer who played as a midfielder.

While at Lens, he played his only match for the France national team, a 2–0 friendly win over Poland on 24 April 1976 at his club ground, the Stade Félix-Bollaert.
