= US Diamantinoise =

- Full name: Union Sportive Diamantinoise
- Ground: Dizac, Le Diamant, Martinique
- Manager: Jules Eustache
- League: Martinique Championnat National
- 2025–26: TBA
Home colours

Union Sportive Diamantinoise is a football club based in Le Diamant, Martinique. The club plays in the Martinique Championnat National, and plays its home matches at Dizac.
