= AJ Petite-Île =

Association football club in Réunion

- Ground: Stade Raphaël Babet; Saint-Joseph, Réunion
- Capacity: 2,500
- Manager: Kiki Mallet
- League: Reunion Premier League
- 2014: 5th

AJ Petite-Île is a Réunion football club based in Saint-Joseph.
