= AS Marsouins =

Association football club in Réunion

- Full name: Association Sportive Les Marsouins
- Founded: 1955; 70 years ago
- Ground: Stade Saint-Leu; Saint-Leu, Réunion Island
- Capacity: 1,000
- Chairman: René-Guy Flavigny
- Manager: Ziff dos Santos
- League: Réunion Premier League
- 2014: 7th
Home colours	Away colours

Association Sportive Les Marsouins, is a football (soccer) club from Saint-Leu, Réunion Island.

== Stadium ==
The club plays their home matches at Stade Saint-Leu, which has a maximum capacity of 1,000 people.

== Achievements ==
- Réunion Premier League
  - Champions (1): 2000
- Coupe de la Réunion
  - Winners (2): 1997, 2007

== Performance in CAF competitions ==
- CAF Champions League: 1 appearance

2001 – First Round

- CAF Cup Winners' Cup: 2 appearances

1998 – First Round
1999 – First Round

== The club in the French football structure ==
- French Cup: 1 appearance

2000–01
