= Ligue réunionnaise de football =

Governing body of association football in Réunion

CAF
- Founded: 1956
- Headquarters: Saint-Denis
- FIFA affiliation: None
- CAF affiliation: 17 December 1992 (associate member)
- President: Yves Ethève
- Website: https://liguefoot-reunion.fff.fr

The Réunionese Football League (French: Ligue Réunionnaise de Football) is the governing body of association football in Réunion. It is not a FIFA member and only an associate member of the Confederation of African Football since 1992. It organizes matches for the Réunion national football team and for the domestic clubs.
