= Saint-Pauloise FC =

Association football club in Réunion

- Full name: Saint-Pauloise Football Club
- Nicknames: Les Rouges et les Bleus (The Reds and Blues)
- Founded: 2000
- Ground: Stade Paul Julius Bénard; Saint-Paul, Réunion
- Capacity: 8,288
- Chairman: Jean Jacques Charolais
- Coach: Christian Dafreville
- League: Réunion Premier League
- 2025: 4th
- Website: http://saint-pauloisefootballclub.e-monsite.com/
Home colours	Away colours

The Saint-Pauloise FC is a football club based in Saint-Paul, Réunion, France.

== History ==
The club was established in 2000 following the merger of two clubs from Saint-Paul: the SS St. Pauloise and Olympique de Saint-Paul. It has the largest number of licensees: 1063.

In 2003 the club was promoted to D1P, and lost in the finals of the Regional Cup in France against the USST 1–0. After the end of season 2007, the club was relegated to D2R. It returned to D1P the following season as champions of D2R. In 2010, the club won the St. Pauloise Regional Cup: France against AS Excelsior. In the 7th round of the Coupe de France they lost 1–0 against Lannion. It was in 2011 and during the last day of D1P, the club won the championship by defeating the Tamponnaise 2–0. St. Pauloise FC claimed the double by winning the Cup Meeting 1–0 (aet) against SS Saint-Louis.

The club decided not to participate in the Champions League CAF 2012 for financial reasons, but took part in the 2nd edition of the Indian Ocean Champion Clubs' Cup in 2012. The 2012 season was marked by the defeat in the final of the Indian Ocean Champion Clubs' Cup facing CNAPS Sport (2–1 victory on the way).

Saint-Pauloise also won the Reunion championship in 2014 under the guidance of Jean-Jacques Charolais.

== Awards ==
This section includes awards for both the current and merged teams.

=== SS St. Pauloise ===
- Champion Reunion D1P (5)
  - 1979, 1981, 1983, 1985, 1986

=== St. Pauloise FC ===
- Champion Reunion D1P (2)
  - 2011, 2014
- Reunion Cup (1)
  - 2011
- Champion of D2R Reunion (1)
  - 2008

== Players ==
Note: Flags indicate national team as defined under FIFA eligibility rules; some limited exceptions apply. Players may hold more than one non-FIFA nationality.

No.	Pos.	Nation	Player
1	GK	REU	Mathieu Pélops
2	DF	REU	Olivier Thévanin
3	DF	REU	Mathieu Saïdou
4	DF	REU	Larry Edmond
5	DF	REU	Cedric Besson
6	DF	MAD	Sedera Randriamparany
7	MF	REU	Yvann Borahimo
10	MF	REU	Vincent Escudé-Candau
11	FW	Mayotte	Antoine Rasolofonirina
14	MF	REU	Alexis Siala-Chamba
16	GK	REU	Johnnifer Natio
17	MF	REU	Anthony Siva

No.	Pos.	Nation	Player
17	DF	REU	Cédric Fraumens
18	FW	REU	Nikolas Hoarau
19	FW	REU	Willy Robert
20	MF	REU	John Babas
23	FW	REU	Benoit Cholet
25	FW	REU	Jérémy Basquaise
26	MF	REU	Hubert Gerrard (Captain)
28	FW	REU	Romain Tossem
32	GK	REU	Joe Lauret
—	DF	REU	Idriss Saïdou
—	MF	CGO	Dylan Bahamboula
