= SS Jeanne d'Arc =

Association football club in Réunion

- Full name: Société Sportive La Jeanne d'Arc
- Founded: 1927
- Ground: Stade Georges Lambrakis; Le Port, Réunion Island
- Capacity: 1,956
- Chairman: Sergio Erapa
- Manager: Thierry Zitte
- League: Réunion Premier League
- 2025: 5th
Home colours

Société Sportive La Jeanne d'Arc, is a football club from Le Port, Réunion Island.

== Stadium ==
The club plays their home matches at Stade Georges Lambrakis, which has a maximum capacity of 2000 people.

== Achievements ==
- Réunion Premier League: 1

1952

- Coupe de la Réunion: 4

1958, 1960, 1967, 2001

== Performance in CAF competitions ==
- CAF Cup Winners' Cup: 1 appearance

2002 – Second Round

== The club in the French football structure ==
- French Cup: 1 appearance

1999–00

== Squad ==
Note: Flags indicate national team as defined under FIFA eligibility rules; some limited exceptions apply. Players may hold more than one non-FIFA nationality.

No.	Pos.	Nation	Player
—	GK		Boris Mérion
—	GK		Gwenaël Lof
—	GK		Cédric Elcaman
—	DF		Médéric Louise
—	DF		Jimmy Elcaman
—	DF		Alexandre Rivière
—	DF		Didier Rivière
—	DF		Dimitri Jovien
—	DF		Freddy Somaria
—	DF		David Tévanin
—	MF		Garry Soreya
—	MF		Rodric Kassime

No.	Pos.	Nation	Player
—	MF		Alex Palmary
—	MF		Xavier Solente
—	MF		Nicolas Figuin
—	MF		Frédéric Tatel
—	MF		Grégory Cady
—	MF		Jonathan Convert
—	FW		Sergio Elcaman
—	FW		Emmanuel De Louise
—	FW		Abdou Ibrahim
—	FW		Raphaël Hoarau
—	FW	MRI	Christopher Perle
