= Saint-Denis FC =

Association football club in Réunion

Saint-Denis
- Full name: Saint-Denis Football Club
- Ground: La Redoute Stadium; Saint-Denis, Réunion Island
- Capacity: 2,000
- League: Réunion Premier League

Saint-Denis FC, is a football club from Saint-Denis, Réunion Island.

They currently play in the Réunion Premier League.

== Stadium ==
Currently the team plays at the 2000 capacity Stade de la Redoute A.

== Honours ==
- Réunion Premier League
  - Winners (5): 1980, 1984, 1987, 1995, 1996, 2022
- Coupe de la Réunion
  - Winners (8): 1974, 1975, 1977, 1978, 1979, 1985, 1986, 1988
- Coupe D.O.M.
  - Winners (1): 1996
- Outremer Champions Cup
  - Winners (1): 1997
