= US Sainte-Marienne =

Association football club in Réunion

- Full name: Union Sportive Sainte-Marienne
- Nickname: Blaugranas pei
- Short name: USSM
- Founded: 2004
- Ground: Stade Duparc; Sainte-Marie, Réunion
- Capacity: 1,500
- Chairman: Simon Frédéric
- Manager: Benny Jérôme
- League: Réunion Premier League
- 2014: 4th

Union Sportive Sainte-Marienne is a football club from Réunion based in Sainte-Marie.

== Players ==
=== Current squad ===
==== First team ====
November 2021 Note: Flags indicate national team as defined under FIFA eligibility rules; some limited exceptions apply. Players may hold more than one non-FIFA nationality.

No.	Pos.	Nation	Player
—	GK	REU	Johnyfer Natio
—	GK	REU	Sébastien Anélard
—	DF	COM	Faydine Daroussi
—	DF	FRA	Lihiyoini Musbahou
—	DF	REU	Vincent Toulessy
—	DF	REU	Florent Ichiza
—	DF	CIV	Lionel Djebi-Zadi
—	DF	ALG	Sofiane Ben Braham
—	DF	FRA	Kévin Remanaho
—	MF	MAD	Bourahim Jaotombo

No.	Pos.	Nation	Player
—	MF	REU	Alexandre Faconnier
—	MF	REU	Loïc Myrthe
—	MF	REU	Boris Welmant
—	MF	MAD	Fidèle Commune
—	MF	REU	Mouritaza Houmadi
—	MF	REU	Jonathan Latchoumanin
—	MF	REU	Anderson Bruno
—	FW	REU	Cliff Bironda
—	FW	REU	Anthony Mansard

== Achievements ==
- Coupe de la Réunion: 1

2010

== Performance in CAF competitions ==
- CAF Confederation Cup: 1 appearance

2011 – Preliminary round
