= La Tamponnaise =

Association football club in Réunion

- Full name: La Tamponnaise
- Founded: 1982
- Ground: Stade Klébert Picard; Le Tampon, Réunion Island
- Capacity: 4,000
- Chairman: Fred Mangue
- Manager: Jean-Pierre Bade
- League: Réunion Premier League
- 2025: 8th

La Tamponnaise is a football club from Le Tampon, Réunion Island, founded in 1982 as the result of the merger between S/S Tamponnaise (founded in 1922) and Stade Tamponnais (founded in 1971). In 2014 the club was renamed La Tamponnaise.

== Stadium ==
The club plays its home matches at Stade Klébert Picard, which has a maximum capacity of 4,000 people.

== Achievements ==
- Réunion Premier League: 11

1991, 1992, 1999, 2003, 2004, 2005, 2006, 2007, 2009, 2010, 2021.

- Coupe de la Réunion: 6

1991, 2000, 2003, 2008, 2009, 2012

- Coupe D.O.M: 1

2000

- Outremer Champions Cup: 3

2001, 2004, 2007

- Océan Indien Cup: 3

2004, 2006, 2007

== Performance in CAF competitions ==
- CAF Champions League: 4 appearances

2000 – First Round
2004 – withdrew in First Round
2008 – First Round
2009 – First Round

- CAF Cup: 4 appearances

1995 – First Round
1996 – Quarter-Finals
1997 – First Round
1999 – Second Round

- CAF Cup Winners' Cup: 2 appearances

1994 – Quarter-Finals
2001 – First Round

== The club in the French football structure ==
- French Cup: 6 appearances

1992–93, 1998–99, 2003–04, 2006–07, 2011–12, 2022–23

Ties won
Year	Round	Home team (tier)	Score	Away team (tier)
2006–07	Round 7	Schiltigheim (4)	0–7	US Stade Tamponnaise
2022–23	Round 8	La Tamponnaise	1–0	FCM Aubervilliers (5)
