= AS Excelsior =

Association football club in Réunion

- Full name: Association Sportive de l'Excelsior
- Nickname: les Perícans
- Founded: October 6, 1940; 85 years ago
- Ground: Stade Raphaël Babet; Saint-Joseph, Réunion
- Capacity: 2,130
- Chairman: Rock Bénard
- Manager: Fares Bousdira
- League: Réunion Premier League
- 2025: 3rd
Home colours

Association Sportive de l'Excelsior is an association football club from Saint-Joseph, Réunion.

== Stadium ==
The club plays its home matches at Stade Raphaël Babet, which has a maximum capacity of 2,130.

== Achievements ==
- Réunion Premier League: 3

1974, 2023, 2024

- Coupe de la Réunion: 5

2004, 2005, 2014, 2015, 2024

== Performance in CAF competitions ==
- CAF Champions League: 1 appearance

2006 – Preliminary Round

== The club in the French football structure ==
- French Cup: 7 appearances

1974–75, 2001–02, 2009–10, 2014–15, 2015–16, 2016–17, 2017–2018

Ties won
Year	Round	Home team (tier)	Score	Away team (tier)
2009–10	Round 7	AS Excelsior	1–0	Quimper (4)
2015–16	Round 7	AS Excelsior	1–0 (a.e.t.)	AS Poissy (4)
2016–17	Round 7	Avoine OCC (5)	1–1 (a.e.t.) (2–4 p)	AS Excelsior
2016–17	Round 8	AS Excelsior	1–1 (a.e.t.) (3–0 p)	FC Mulhouse (4)
2017–18	Round 7	Feignies Aulnoye FC (5)	1–3	AS Excelsior

== Current squad ==
Note: Flags indicate national team as defined under FIFA eligibility rules; some limited exceptions apply. Players may hold more than one non-FIFA nationality.

No.	Pos.	Nation	Player
3	DF	REU	Frederic Nativel
7	MF	REU	Joselito Gonneville
9	FW	REU	Salomon Kehi

No.	Pos.	Nation	Player
18	FW	MAD	Jean Britton Mandilimana
20	FW	MAD	Ruphin Menakely
24	FW	FRA	Djardji Nadhoime
—	FW	ALG	Mansour Boutabout
