= 2016–17 Coupe de France preliminary rounds =

French football qualifying tournament

2016–17 Coupe de France
Coupe Charles Simon

Tournament details
- Country: France

The 2016–17 Coupe de France preliminary rounds made up the qualifying competition to decide which teams took part in the main competition from round 7. This was the 100th season of the main football cup competition of France. The competition was organised by the French Football Federation (FFF) and was open to all clubs in French football, as well as clubs from the overseas departments and territories (Guadeloupe, French Guiana, Martinique, Mayotte, New Caledonia (qualification via 2016 New Caledonia Cup), Tahiti (qualification via 2016 Tahiti Cup), Réunion, and Saint Martin).

The qualifying rounds took place between March and October 2016.

== Second round ==
=== French Guiana ===
These matches were scheduled for 27 August 2016.

Second round results: French Guiana

Tie no	Home team (tier)	Score	Away team (tier)
1.	(French Guiana) ASC Kawina (non)	3–0 (Note: Game won by forfeit)	ASCS Maripasoula (non) (French Guiana)
2.	(French Guiana) Cosma Foot (DH)	0–3	ASE Matoury (DH) (French Guiana)

Note: French Guiana League Structure (no promotion to French League Structure):
Division d'Honneur (DH)
Promotion d'Honneur (PH)

=== Guadeloupe ===
These matches were played between 26 and 28 August 2016.

Second round results: Guadeloupe

Tie no	Home team (tier)	Score	Away team (tier)
1.	(Guadeloupe) RC de Basse-Terre (PHR)	1–0	Av St Rosien (PH) (Guadeloupe)
2.	(Guadeloupe) JS Vieux-Habitants (PH)	3–1	CS Bouillantais (PHR) (Guadeloupe)
3.	(Guadeloupe) La Fregate (PH)	5–4 (a.e.t.)	SC Baie Mahault (PHR) (Guadeloupe)
4.	(Guadeloupe) Dynamo Le Moule (PD)	2–6	Club Amical Marquisa (PHR) (Guadeloupe)
5.	(Guadeloupe) Indomptable De Morne (PD)	0–3	Rapid Club (PH) (Guadeloupe)
6.	(Guadeloupe) Juvenis (PH)	1–3	ASC Madiana (PH) (Guadeloupe)
7.	(Guadeloupe) Cactus Ste Anne (PHR)	3–1	AS Nenuphars (PH) (Guadeloupe)
8.	(Guadeloupe) St. Lamentinois (PH)	3–1	L Eclair (PH) (Guadeloupe)
9.	(Guadeloupe) ANJE (PHR)	1–1 (7–6 p)	Evolucas Lamentin (PHR) (Guadeloupe)

Note: Guadeloupe League Structure (no promotion to French League Structure):
Division d'Honneur (DH)
Promotion d'Honneur Régionale (PHR)
Promotion d'Honneur (PH)
Première Division (PD)

=== Martinique ===
These matches were played between 27 August and 1 September 2016.

Second round results: Martinique

Tie no	Home team (tier)	Score	Away team (tier)
1.	(Martinique) Sainte Anne Cap 110 (LR3)	0–5	Good Luck (LR1) (Martinique)
2.	(Martinique) CS Bélimois (LR3)	0–9	Aiglon (LR1) (Martinique)
3.	(Martinique) La Gauloise de Trinité (LR3)	2–2 (3–4 p)	AS New Club (LR1) (Martinique)
4.	(Martinique) Etoile (LR3)	1–2	Assaut (LR3) (Martinique)
5.	(Martinique) US Marinoise (LR2)	3–1	Réal Tartane (LR2) (Martinique)
6.	(Martinique) ASC Hirondelle (LR3)	1–4	Réveil Sportif (LR3) (Martinique)
7.	(Martinique) RC Lorrain (LR2)	3–0	AC Vert-Pré (LR2) (Martinique)
8.	(Martinique) SC Lamentin (LR3)	1–3	New Star (LR1) (Martinique)
9.	(Martinique) RC Rivière-Pilote (LR1)	2–0	AS Morne Des Esses (LR2) (Martinique)
10.	(Martinique) Eveil (LR3)	2–0	ASCEF (LR3) (Martinique)
11.	(Martinique) Eclair (LR2)	3–2	Club Péléen (LR2) (Martinique)
12.	(Martinique) UJ Monnérot (LR3)	4–0	ASC Mon Pito (LR3) (Martinique)
13.	(Martinique) L Intrépide (LR3)	3–0	Santana (LR3) (Martinique)
14.	(Martinique) Silver Star (LR3)	0–5	Golden Star (LR1) (Martinique)
15.	(Martinique) Essor-Préchotain (LR1)	8–0	Etincelle (LR3) (Martinique)
16.	(Martinique) US Riveraine (LR3)	2–1	Etendard (LR2) (Martinique)
17.	(Martinique) UJ Redoute (LR3)	2–1	Stade Spiritain (LR3) (Martinique)
18.	(Martinique) Emulation (LR2)	10–0	Gri-gri Pilotin FC (LR3) (Martinique)
19.	(Martinique) US Robert (LR2)	2–1	Olympique (LR3) (Martinique)
20.	(Martinique) Anses Arlets FC (LR3)	3–0	JS Marigot (LR3) (Martinique)
21.	(Martinique) FEP Monésie (LR2)	0–0 (3–4 p)	AS Samaritaine (LR2) (Martinique)
22.	(Martinique) CSC Carbet (LR3)	7–2	CODST (LR3) (Martinique)
23.	(Martinique) CO Trenelle (LR3)	0–2	US Diamantinoise (LR1) (Martinique)
24.	(Martinique) Oceanic (LR3)	0–3 (Note: Oceanic penalised and removed from the competition. Excelsior progress to the Third Round.)	Excelsior (LR1) (Martinique)
25.	(Martinique) Solidarite (LR3)	0–2	RC St Joseph (LR2) (Martinique)

Note: Martinique League Structure (no promotion to French League Structure):
Ligue Régionale 1 (LR1)
Ligue Régionale 2 (LR2)
Ligue Régionale 3 (LR3)

=== Mayotte ===
These matches played on 26 March 2016

Second round results: Mayotte

Tie no	Home team (tier)	Score	Away team (tier)
1.	(Mayotte) FC Mtsapéré (DH)	3–1	Étincelles Hamjago (DH) (Mayotte)
2.	(Mayotte) USCJ Koungou (DHT)	0–2	AS Neige (DH) (Mayotte)
3.	(Mayotte) FCO Tsingoni (DHT)	3–0	CJ Mronabéja (PH) (Mayotte)
4.	(Mayotte) US Ouangani (PH)	3–2	Miracle du Sud (DH) (Mayotte)
5.	(Mayotte) Bandrélé Foot (PH)	3–3 (2–4 p)	ASC Abeilles (DH) (Mayotte)
6.	(Mayotte) FC Chiconi (PH)	3–0	Voulvavi Sports (PH) (Mayotte)
7.	(Mayotte) UCS Sada (DHT)	0–0 (3–2 p)	FC Sohoa (PH) (Mayotte)
8.	(Mayotte) US Mtsangamboua (PH)	0–2	ASC Kawéni (DHT) (Mayotte)
9.	(Mayotte) FC Koropa (DH)	0–1	Foudre 2000 (DH) (Mayotte)
10.	(Mayotte) Missile Rouge (DHT)	0–3	CS Mramadoudou (PH) (Mayotte)
11.	(Mayotte) ASJ Moinatrindri (DHT)	2–0	ASJ Handréma (DH) (Mayotte)
12.	(Mayotte) AS Jumeaux de M'zouazia (DH)	2–3	VCO Vahibé (DH) (Mayotte)
13.	(Mayotte) AS Rosador (DH)	5–1	Diables Noirs (DH) (Mayotte)
14.	(Mayotte) FC Labattoir (DHT)	0–0 (4–2 p)	FC Dembéni (DHT) (Mayotte)
15.	(Mayotte) AS Sada (DHT)	1–2	Enfants de Mayotte (DHT)
16.	(Mayotte) AS Racine du Nord (DHT)	2–1	AJ Kani-kéli (PH) (Mayotte)

Note: Mayotte League Structure (no promotion to French League Structure):
Division d'Honneur (DH)
Division d'Honneur Territoriale (DHT)
Promotion d'Honneur (PH)

=== Réunion ===
These matches were played between 1 and 3 July 2016.

Second round results: Réunion

Tie no	Home team (tier)	Score	Away team (tier)
1.	(Réunion) AS Etoile du Sud (D2D)	1–2	ASC Grands Bois (D2R) (Réunion)
2.	(Réunion) JS Bellemene 2007 (D2D)	1–5	AS Capricorne (D1R) (Réunion)
3.	(Réunion) JS Bras Creux (D2D)	1–0	Saint Denis EDFA (D1R) (Réunion)
4.	(Réunion) SS Jeanne d'Arc (D1R)	3–0	AS Marsouins (D1R) (Réunion)
5.	(Réunion) JS Piton St Leu (D1R)	1–2	AS Saint-Suzanne (D1R) (Réunion)
6.	(Réunion) AS Eveche (D2D)	3–3 (4–5 p)	Vincendo Sport (D2D) (Réunion)
7.	(Réunion) Saint-Denis FC (D1R)	2–1	OC St Andre les Léopards (D2R) (Réunion)
8.	(Réunion) AF Saint-Louisien (D2R)	1–0	FC Bagatelle Sainte-Suzanne (D2R) (Réunion)
9.	(Réunion) Saint-Pauloise FC (D1R)	2–0	AJS de l'Ouest (D2R) (Réunion)
10.	(Réunion) La Tamponnaise (D2D)	2–1	AJ Petite-Île (D1R) (Réunion)
11.	(Réunion) Trois Bassins FC (D2R)	2–2 (5–4 p)	US Sainte-Marienne (D1R) (Réunion)
12.	(Réunion) US Bellemene Canot (D2D)	5–2	FC Avirons (D2R) (Réunion)
13.	(Réunion) AS St Philippe (D2R)	2–1	AFC Saint Laurent (D2D) (Réunion)
14.	(Réunion) SS Rivière Sport (D2D)	0–3	JS Saint-Pierroise (D1R) (Réunion)
15.	(Réunion) AS Excelsior (D1R)	1–0	JC Saint-Pierrois (D2R) (Réunion)
16.	(Réunion) AS Grand Fond (D2R)	2–1	FC 17ème Km (D2D) (Réunion)

Note: Reúnion League Structure (no promotion to French League Structure):
Division 1 Régionale (D1R)
Division 2 Régionale (D2R)
Division 2 Départementale (D2D)
Division 3 Départementale (D3D)

=== Bourgogne ===
These matches were played on 28 August 2016.

Second round results: Bourgogne

Tie no	Home team (tier)	Score	Away team (tier)
1.	CA St Georges (10)	2–1	US Cerisiers (8)
2.	RC Sens (9)	0–1	ASUC Migennes (8)
3.	CSP Charmoy (9)	3–0	FC Chassignelles Lezinnes (10)
4.	ESIV St Sérotin (11)	0–5	AS Chablis (9)
5.	Amicale Franco-Portugais Sens (9)	1–1 (1–4 p)	US Varennes (8)
6.	US Joigny (8)	4–1	Union Châtillonniase Colombine (9)
7.	AJ Villeneuvienne (12)	2–4	SC Gron (9)
8.	AS Véron (10)	4–1	AS Gurgy (11)
9.	Cosnois FC (12)	0–6	ASA Vauzelles (8)
10.	AS St Benin (8)	0–2	AS Magny (9)
11.	Dornes Neuville Olympique (8)	2–3	CS Corbigeois (9)
12.	AS Fourchambault (8)	1–2	AS Garchizy (7)
13.	Montillot FC (11)	0–3	AS Clamecy (7)
14.	FC Chevannes (10)	3–0	US Bourbon-Lancy FPT (8)
15.	JS Marzy (9)	0–4	FREP Luthenay (10)
16.	Union Cosnois Sportive (7)	0–1	US La Charité (7)
17.	JF Palingeois (8)	1–4 (a.e.t.)	US Cheminots Paray (7)
18.	AS Perrecy-les-Forges (9)	0–1	Digoin FCA (8)
19.	ES Pouilloux (10)	0–3	US St Martin-Senozan (11)
20.	SC Mâcon (10)	5–1	US Blanzy (8)
21.	Grury Issy Foot (11)	1–4	SR Clayettois (9)
22.	St Vallier Sport (11)	3–0	FC Bois du Verne (9)
23.	US Cluny (8)	1–3	JS Crechoise (7)
24.	FC Clessé (12)	2–8	US St Bonnet/La Guiche (8)
25.	US Rigny-sur-Arroux (9)	1–4	AS Chapelloise (7)
26.	US Saillenard (12)	0–3	AS Sornay (8)
27.	FC Épervans (9)	1–4	FR Saint Marcel (7)
28.	CS Varennois (12)	2–7	AS Tournus (11)
29.	SC Châteaurenaud (11)	0–5	CS Mervans (9)
30.	US Sennecey-le-Grand et Son Canton (9)	4–2	FC Sassenay-Virey-Lessard-Fragnes (9)
31.	US San-Martinoise (12)	1–8	AS Châtenoy-le-Royal (8)
32.	AFC Cuiseaux-Champagnat (11)	5–0	IS Bresse Nord (11)
33.	US Cuisery (12)	1–2	FC Abergement-de-Cuisery (8)
34.	JO Le Creusot (8)	2–4	AS Beaune (7)
35.	FLL Gergy-Verjux (10)	2–4 (a.e.t.)	CS Auxonnais (7)
36.	Union Franco-Cambodigienne Torcy (11)	2–3	FC Chassagne-Montrachet (9)
37.	SC Etangois (10)	0–5	AS Genlis (8)
38.	FC Aiserey-Izeure (9)	2–5	JS Rully (9)
39.	AS Lacanche (11)	2–5	ESA Breuil (8)
40.	AS Canton du Bligny-sur-Ouche (11)	0–4	US Meursault (7)
41.	US Brazey (10)	4–10	Chalon ACF (8)
42.	FC Talant (10)	2–6	ASFC Daix (9)
43.	UFC de l'Ouche (11)	0–10	US Cheminots Dijonnais (7)
44.	Chevigny Saint Sauveur (7)	2–0	FC Mirebellois-Pontailler-Lamarche (8)
45.	FC Remilly-sur-Tille (10)	0–1	SC Vitteaux (11)
46.	ASC Plombières-Lès-Dijon (8)	4–0	ASPTT Dijon (7)
47.	CSL Chenôve (10)	4–2	Val de Norge FC (8)
48.	ALC Longvic (7)	2–0	Montbard Venarey (8)
49.	Fontaine-lès-Dijon FC (7)	0–1	Réveil Is-sur-Tille (7)

=== Auvergne ===
These matches were played on 27 and 28 August 2016.

Second round results: Auvergne

Tie no	Home team (tier)	Score	Away team (tier)
1.	AG Sigolenoise (11)	1–3	Ass. Vergongheon-Arvant (7)
2.	ES Vebret-Ydes (12)	0–3	FC Artense (8)
3.	FC Ally Mauriac (8)	0–6	US St Flour (7)
4.	AS Cheminots Langeac (8)	0–3 (Note: AS Cheminots Langeac penalised for a technical infringement. Original scoreline was 0–1)	AS Loudes (9)
5.	Jordanne FC (11)	0–5	US Vallée de l'Authre (7)
6.	USP Commentryenne (9)	1–5	SC St Pourcain (10)
7.	EFC St Amant-Tallende (8)	1–0	US Beaumontoise (7)
8.	FC Issoire 2 (12)	0–3	Pérignat FC (7)
9.	FCUS Ambert (7)	2–0 (a.e.t.)	AS St Jacques (7)
10.	US Vallon (9)	1–2	AS Trévoloise (9)
11.	FC Hauts de Cère (13)	0–1	CS Arpajonnais (7)
12.	US Besse (11)	1–3	ALS Besse Egliseneuve (9)
13.	US La Chapelle-Laurent (11)	2–1	AS Yolet (10)
14.	Sporting Chataigneraie Cantal (7)	2–1	ES Pierrefortaise (8)
15.	Sud Cantal Foot (8)	3–0	AS Espinat (9)
16.	FC Coltines (11)	4–3	US Crandelles (8)
17.	US Haut-Célé (11)	1–2	ES St Mamet (9)
18.	US Fontannes (9)	3–4	FC Dunières (10)
19.	AS Chadrac (7)	3–1	US Monistrol (7)
20.	US Arsac-en-Velay (9)	1–3	AS Emblavez-Vorey (8)
21.	AS St Pierre-Eynac (10)	0–5	US Blavozy (7)
22.	Montregard JL Raucoules (10)	0–3	FC Aurec (9)
23.	US Bains-St Christophe (10)	2–5 (a.e.t.)	Olympic St Julien-Chapteuil (8)
24.	AS St Didier-St Just (9)	4–4 (4–1 p)	FC Vézézoux (10)
25.	Sauveteurs Brivois (11)	2–1	AS Grazac-Lapte (8)
26.	AS Pléaux-Rilhac-Barriac (11)	0–3	AS Sansacoise (8)
27.	JS Neuvy (10)	1–2	US Biachette Désertines (9)
28.	AS Neuilly-le-Réal (10)	1–3	Bellerive-Brugheas Foot (10)
29.	US Lignerolles-Lavault Ste Anne (9)	0–5	AS Moulins (7)
30.	CS Bessay (9)	8–0	AS Billezois (10)
31.	Etoile Moulins Yzeure (9)	1–5	AA Lapalisse (7)
32.	AS Ferrières-sur-Sichon (10)	0–3	AS Dompierroise (8)
33.	US Toque Huriel (10)	1–4	FC Bézenet (9)
34.	US Malicorne (11)	0–5	AS Tronget (9)
35.	FC Couleuvre (11)	0–13	FC Billy-Crechy (8)
36.	AS Louchy (9)	3–1	AS Le Breuil (10)
37.	SCA Cussét (8)	12–2	CS Cosne D'Allier (9)
38.	AC Creuzier-le-Vieux (8)	3–4	AS Cheminots St Germain (10)
39.	AS Lurcy-Lévis (10)	0–5	Bourbon Sportif (9)
40.	CS Vaux-Estivareilles (11)	4–0	CS Thiel-sur-Acolin (11)
41.	AS Mercy-Chapeau (10)	1–2	Médiéval Club Montluçonnais (11)
42.	AS Châtel-de-Neuvre (11)	3–1	AS Cérilly (9)
43.	US Doyet (9)	7–0	US Abrest (10)
44.	AGuiRA FC (11)	2–3	US Issoire (11)
45.	FC Blanzat (9)	0–2	Dômes-Sancy Foot (9)
46.	ES St Germinoise (10)	2–2 (5–4 p)	Espérance Ceyratois Football (8)
47.	AS Charensat (11)	0–5	AS Romagnat (11)
48.	US Ennezat (9)	2–5	US Vic-le-Comte (8)
49.	AS Livradois Sud (9)	2–1	AS St Ours (10)
50.	US Lapeyrouse (10)	2–0	FC Vertaizon (9)
51.	RC Charbonnières-les-Varennes (10)	3–4 (a.e.t.)	US Les Martres-de-Veyre (8)
52.	JS St Priest-des-Champs (11)	2–3	FA Le Cendre (8)
53.	AS Orcines (10)	0–7	FC Riom (7)
54.	FF Chappes (10)	3–2	ES Saint-Maurice-ès-Allier (11)
55.	Aulnat Sportif (9)	5–3	US Gerzat (10)
56.	US Mozac (9)	1–0	US St Beauzire (7)
57.	US Val de Couze Chambon (10)	2–1	Clermont Métropole FC (10)
58.	US Les Martres-d'Artière (10)	0–8	FC Châtel-Guyon (8)
59.	CSA Brassacois Florinois (9)	3–2	FC Nord Combraille (9)
60.	AS Moissat (10)	7–1	AL Glaine-Montaigut (11)
61.	FC Massiac-Molompize-Blesle (8)	1–0	ES Riomois-Condat (8)
62.	SC Gannat (6)	2–0	FC Souvigny (10)

=== Lower Normandy ===
These matches were played on 28 August and 3 September 2016.

Second round results: Lower Normandy

Tie no	Home team (tier)	Score	Away team (tier)
1.	AS Cerencaise (12)	1–3	US St Quentin-sur-le-Homme (8)
2.	AS Brix (9)	0–4	AS Cherbourg (7)
3.	ES Quettetot-Rauville (10)	0–5	CS Carentan (8)
4.	US Côte-des-Isles (8)	0–3	ES Coutances (6)
5.	FC Agon-Coutainville (8)	2–0	ES Pointe Hague (6)
6.	US La Glacerie (9)	0–5	FC Équeurdreville-Hainneville (8)
7.	Elan Tocqueville (10)	0–1	UC Bricquebec (8)
8.	Périers SF (9)	0–2	FC Val de Saire (10)
9.	ES des Marais (11)	0–3	US Ouest Cotentin (8)
10.	Ass. St Martin Hardinvast-Tollevast-Couville (9)	0–2	AS Tourlaville (6)
11.	St Hilaire-Virey-Landelles (10)	2–2 (3–5 p)	Patriote St Jamais (9)
12.	CS Villedieu (8)	0–1	AS Brécey (7)
13.	AS Vaudry-Truttemer (11)	2–3	SS St Georges-Domfront (8)
14.	AS Passais-St Fraimbault (10)	3–5	Espérance St Jean-des-Champs (8)
15.	La Bréhalaise FC (8)	2–1	US Mortainaise (10)
16.	AS Jullouville-Sartilly (10)	2–1	US St Pairaise (8)
17.	Avenir Messei (9)	1–1 (4–3 p)	US Ducey (7)
18.	Espérance St Jean-de-la-Haize (10)	0–2	USM Donville (9)
19.	ES Terregate-Beuvron-Juilley (10)	2–12	AF Virois (6)
20.	ES Marigny-Lozon-Mesnil-Vigot (10)	1–4	AS St Vigor-le-Grand (8)
21.	Condé Sports (8)	0–1	FC Saint-Lô Manche (6)
22.	US Villers-Bocage (8)	5–0	ES Hébécrevon (9)
23.	AS Verson (8)	1–2	Réveil St Germain Courselles-sur-Mer (7)
24.	CA Pontois (9)	1–0	ES Carpiquet (8)
25.	Lystrienne Sportive (9)	3–2 (a.e.t.)	FC des Etangs (9)
26.	US Thaon-Le Fresne-Vallée de la Mue (9)	0–2	JS Douvres (7)
27.	US Ste Croix St Lô (9)	0–6	Bayeux FC (6)
28.	US Maisons (10)	4–2	US Aunay-sur-Odon (9)
29.	US Authie (13)	0–6	AS Cahagnes (9)
30.	FC 3 Rivières (9)	2–2 (2–3 p)	USI Bessin Nord (9)
31.	ES Portaise (11)	2–3	Inter Odon FC (8)
32.	US Bretteville-l'Orgueilleuse (10)	1–3	Agneaux FC (7)
33.	US Randonnai (11)	2–1 (a.e.t.)	Sées FC (9)
34.	AS Berd'huis Foot (9)	1–9	US Alençon (6)
35.	Etoile du Perche (9)	0–4	Football Club Argentan (7)
36.	Jeunesse Fertoise Bagnoles (8)	6–1	US Mortagnaise (8)
37.	AS Courteille Alençon (9)	2–0	US Andaine (9)
38.	ESFC Falaise (8)	1–3	Avenir St Germain-du-Corbéis (9)
39.	AS La Selle-la-Forge (9)	1–2	AS Potigny-Villers-Canivet-Ussy (8)
40.	Amicale Chailloué (10)	0–1	SL Pétruvien (9)
41.	JS Tinchebray (10)	0–8	FC Flers (6)
42.	US Flerienne (11)	2–1	Espérance Condé-sur-Sarthe (9)
43.	CL Colombellois (13)	0–2	FC Argences (10)
44.	USM Blainvillaise (10)	1–5	AS Trouville-Deauville (6)
45.	US Houlgate (9)	3–0	AS Moult-Bellengreville (10)
46.	ES Livarotaise (9)	2–5	SC Hérouvillais (6)
47.	AS Biéville-Beuville (11)	2–3	US Pont-l'Évêque (8)
48.	USC Mézidon (8)	1–3	ASPTT Caen (6)
49.	ES Courtonnaise (11)	0–7	Maladrerie OS (6)
50.	Hermanville-Lion FC (9)	1–1 (2–4 p)	AS St Cyr-Fervaques (9)
51.	CS Orbecquois-Vespièrois (8)	0–8	USON Mondeville (6)
52.	Bourguébus-Soliers FC (8)	4–3	AS Ifs (7)
53.	US Cresserons-Plumetot (10)	0–4	CA Lisieux (8)
54.	ES Troarn (9)	3–3 (3–4 p)	AG Caennaise (7)
55.	AS Giberville (12)	0–8	LC Bretteville-sur-Odon (7)
56.	JS Colleville (10)	4–1	FC Lisieux (9)
57.	AJS Ouistreham (8)	3–3 (1–3 p)	CS Honfleur (7)

=== Centre-Val de Loire ===
These matches were played on 27 and 28 August 2016.

Second round results: Centre-Val de Loire

Tie no	Home team (tier)	Score	Away team (tier)
1.	US Saint-Pierre-des-Corps (7)	2–2 (1–4 p)	AS Montlouis-sur-Loire (7)
2.	Dammarie Foot Bois-Gueslin (8)	0–3 (Note: Dammarie Foot Bois-Gueslin penalised. Original scoreline 1–0)	US Vendôme (8)
3.	US Selommes (9)	1–3	Etoile Brou (9)
4.	FC Perche Senonchoise (10)	0–4	FC St Georges-sur-Eure (7)
5.	CS Lusitanos Beaugency (8)	2–0	US Mer (8)
6.	AG Chécy-Mardié-Bou (11)	0–4	USM Saran (6)
7.	US Beaugency Val-de-Loire (7)	0–3	US Châteauneuf-sur-Loire (6)
8.	CEP La Ferté-Vidame (10)	1–2 (a.e.t.)	SMOC St Jean-de-Braye (7)
9.	FCO Saint-Jean-de-la-Ruelle (10)	5–0	ES Jouy-St Prest (10)
10.	CS Angerville-Pussay (10)	1–0	SC Malesherbes (9)
11.	ES Maintenon-Pierres (9)	0–12	Chartres Horizon (6)
12.	ACSF Dreux (8)	0–2	USM Montargis (6)
13.	ES Chaingy-St Ay (11)	1–6	CAN Portugais Chartres (9)
14.	Amicale de Lucé (7)	1–0	ES Gâtinaise (7)
15.	US La Chapelle-St Mesmin (10)	1–1 (6–7 p)	FCM Ingré (8)
16.	Amicale Épernon (8)	3–1	Avenir Ymonville (9)
17.	ES Marigny 45 (10)	0–4	CA Pithiviers (7)
18.	FC Vasselay-St Éloy-de-Gy (10)	1–6	CSM Sully-sur-Loire (7)
19.	ES Marmagne-Berry-Bouy (10)	0–1	FC St Jean-le-Blanc (7)
20.	US La-Ferté-St Aubin (9)	0–5	J3S Amilly (7)
21.	US Dampierre-en-Burly (10)	4–1 (a.e.t.)	RC Bouzy-Les-Bordes (10)
22.	CS Vignoux-sur-Barangeon (9)	3–0	US Ousson-sur-Loire (9)
23.	FC Coullons-Cerdon (10)	0–9	Vierzon FC (6)
24.	ESCALE Orléans (8)	1–2	USM Olivet (7)
25.	ES Sancoins (11)	2–3	FC St Doulchard (8)
26.	AS Chapelloise (9)	2–2 (5–6 p)	US Aigurande (10)
27.	FC Diors (8)	0–3	ES Trouy (9)
28.	Black Roosters FC (12)	1–2	Avenir Lignières (10)
29.	ECF Bouzanne Vallée Noire (11)	1–1 (2–4 p)	US Montgivray (9)
30.	AS Orval (8)	2–6	Bourges Foot (6)
31.	US Argenton-sur-Creuse (8)	1–7	AS St Amandoise (6)
32.	Joué-lès-Tours FC Touraine (9)	0–0 (7–8 p)	SA Issoudun (7)
33.	AJS Mont Bracieux (8)	6–1	SC Vatan (9)
34.	CA Montrichard (9)	0–2	FC Ouest Tournageau (6)
35.	FC Azay-sur-Cher (10)	1–8	Vineuil SF (6)
36.	AS Esvres (10)	2–4	AS Contres (8)
37.	US Billy (9)	1–2 (a.e.t.)	US Chambray-lès-Tours (7)
38.	St Georges Descartes (8)	2–0	FC Richelieu (8)
39.	Langeais Cinq-Mars Foot (9)	0–6	SC Azay-Cheillé (7)
40.	Espérance Hippolytaine (11)	4–0	ES St Benoît-la-Forêt (11)
41.	JAS Moulins-sur-Céphons (11)	3–2	US Argy (12)
42.	US Le Blanc (9)	0–4	FC Déolois (7)
43.	AS Monts (8)	5–0	US Villedieu-sur-Indre (8)
44.	CS La Membrolle-sur-Choisille (11)	2–3	AS Chouzy-Onzain (8)
45.	ES Oésienne (8)	3–3 (4–3 p)	AFC Blois (8)
46.	US Renaudine (9)	3–3 (2–4 p)	ASJ La Chaussée-St-Victor (9)
47.	Racing La Riche-Tours (8)	1–2	Étoile Bleue St Cyr-sur-Loire (6)
48.	JS Cormeray (11)	0–4	US Chitenay-Cellettes (8)
49.	US Châteaumeillant (9)	2–3	AS Portugais Bourges (7)
50.	ASC Portugais Blois (8)	3–3 (4–5 p)	ES La Ville-aux-Dames (8)
51.	SL Chaillot Vierzon (10)	1–2	Olympique Portugais Mehun-sur-Yèvre (10)

=== Centre-West ===
These matches were played on 27 and 28 August 2016.

Second round results: Centre-West

Tie no	Home team (tier)	Score	Away team (tier)
1.	JS Basseau Angoulême (11)	4–3	Aviron Boutonnais (10)
2.	AS Brie (10)	1–0	US Lezay (10)
3.	ES Mornac (11)	1–4	US Bessines/Morterolles (7)
4.	Nersac FC (10)	1–0	US Marennaise (9)
5.	FC Roullet-St Estèphe (11)	4–1	CS Bussac-Forêt (11)
6.	AS St Yrieix (8)	6–0	Oléron FC (9)
7.	UAS Verdille (11)	0–7	ES Saintes (7)
8.	US Aulnay (10)	2–2 (5–3 p)	CS St Michel-sur-Charente (11)
9.	FC Sévigné Jonzac-St Germain (11)	2–1	UF Barbezieux-Barret (9)
10.	AS Montguyon (10)	3–0	AL St Brice (11)
11.	AS Maritime (9)	0–1	ES Ardin (10)
12.	Rochefort FC (9)	0–1	Jarnac SF (8)
13.	Royan Vaux AFC (7)	1–0	CS Leroy Angoulême (7)
14.	ES Thénacaise (10)	0–3	AS Soyaux (7)
15.	US Donzenac (8)	2–1	SC Verneuil-sur-Vienne (9)
16.	CS Boussac (9)	0–4	AS Gouzon (7)
17.	Gati-Foot (12)	0–7	CA Neuville (7)
18.	AS Civaux (11)	1–2	EF Le Tallud (9)
19.	ACG Foot Sud 86 (11)	2–1	AS Villebois Haute Boëme (8)
20.	US Mélusine (10)	1–0 (a.e.t.)	US Combranssière (8)
21.	ES St Benoit (10)	1–0	FC Nueillaubiers (8)
22.	AS Valdivienne (12)	2–1	FC Chiché (12)
23.	SA Le Palais-sur-Vienne (8)	0–2	ES Aiglons Briviste (7)
24.	JS Lafarge Limoges (8)	1–1 (2–4 p)	ES St Sulpice-le-Guérétois (9)
25.	Tardoire FC La Roche/Rivières (10)	0–3	Stade Ruffec (9)
26.	FC Charente Limousine (9)	3–2	ES Celles-Verrines (9)
27.	AS Grande Champagne (11)	0–7	Avenir Matha (9)
28.	ES Linars (11)	2–3 (a.e.t.)	St Palais SF (8)
29.	Coqs Rouges Mansle (10)	1–4	Avenir Bellac-Berneuil-St Junien-les-Combes (9)
30.	AS Puymoyen (9)	3–0	FC St Brice-sur-Vienne (9)
31.	FC Taizé-Aizie (12)	0–4	ES Marchoise (8)
32.	US Aunisien Puyravault (11)	0–3	SC Mouthiers (9)
33.	EFC DB2S (10)	2–1	CS Beauvoir-sur-Niort (11)
34.	JS Semussac (10)	4–2	JS Sireuil (8)
35.	FRJEP Cornil (10)	2–1	EF Aubussonais (8)
36.	US St Clementoise (10)	3–4	USC Bourganeuf (10)
37.	SS Ste Féréole (9)	2–1	CA Rilhac-Rancon (7)
38.	Amicale St Hilaire-Venarsal (10)	3–1	Entente des Barrages de la Xaintrie (11)
39.	ES Ussac (10)	1–2	AS Nexon (10)
40.	ES Bénévent-Marsac (10)	1–3	Amicale Franco-Portugais Limoges (8)
41.	JS Chambon-sur-Voueize (10)	1–2	ES Ussel (10)
42.	AS Reterre-Fontanières (12)	0–4	FREP St Germain (11)
43.	US St Vaury (9)	1–2	AS Panazol (10)
44.	AS Aiffres (9)	1–1 (1–3 p)	AS Réthaise (7)
45.	ES Aubinrorthais (10)	0–2	ES Beaumont-St Cyr (8)
46.	Buslaurs Thireuil (11)	1–1 (4–2 p)	FC Atlantique (12)
47.	ACS Mahorais (12)	0–1	AAS St Julien-l'Ars (10)
48.	US Champdeniers-Pamplie (11)	1–0	Aunis Avenir FC (9)
49.	ES Chanteloup-Chapelle (10)	0–4	FC Rouillé (11)
50.	AS Coulonges-Thouarsais (12)	2–0 (a.e.t.)	AS Sèvres-Anxaumont (12)
51.	SEPC Exireuil (12)	3–0 (Note: FC Périgny penalised for a technical infringement. Original scoreline 1–5)	FC Périgny (7)
52.	SC L'Absie-Largeasse (12)	1–2	ES Buxerolles (7)
53.	US Mauzé-sur-le-Mignon (11)	4–0	FC La Jarne (11)
54.	AS Portugais Niort (8)	2–0	FC Nord 17 (9)
55.	UA Niort St Florent (8)	3–0	Capaunis ASPTT FC (7)
56.	RC Parthenay Viennay (8)	3–4	ES Nouaillé (7)
57.	FC Pays de l'Ouin (9)	0–3	US Migné-Auxances (9)
58.	ES Pinbrécières (10)	4–4 (3–4 p)	SL Antran (9)
59.	CA St Aubin-le-Cloud (12)	2–5	CA St Savin-St Germain (8)
60.	AS St Pierre-des-Échaubrognes (11)	2–3 (a.e.t.)	CS Naintré (8)
61.	US St Varent Pierregeay (11)	4–2 (a.e.t.)	FC Montamisé (9)
62.	Stade Vouillé (11)	1–0	AAAM Laleu-La Pallice (9)
63.	US Vrère-St Léger-de-Montbrun (11)	0–2	La Ligugéenne Football (7)
64.	FC Vrines (11)	1–4	FC Fleuré (10)
65.	Espérance Availles-en-Châtellerault (11)	2–0	US St Sauveur (8)
66.	ES Brion-St Secondin (11)	3–2	US Chasseneuil (10)
67.	AS Portugais Châtellerault (8)	0–2	SA Moncoutant (9)
68.	FC Fontaine-le-Comte (9)	3–2 (a.e.t.)	ES St Cerbouillé (9)
69.	US Jaunay-Clan (12)	0–7	CO Cerizay (8)
70.	ES Trois Cités Poitiers (9)	1–2	US Courlay (10)
71.	US Usson-du-Poitou (12)	4–2 (a.e.t.)	ES Champniers (10)
72.	ES Vouneuil-sous-Biard (11)	0–3	FC Pays Argentonnais (10)
73.	US Beaune-les-Mines (11)	0–8	AS St Pantaleon (7)
74.	US Nantiat (10)	2–1 (a.e.t.)	ASFC Vindelle (11)
75.	AS Nieul (8)	1–3	ES Guérétoise (7)
76.	FC Canton d'Oradour-sur-Vayres (11)	0–2	Olympique Larche Lafeuillade (9)
77.	US Vigenal Bastide (9)	0–3	Varetz AC (8)
78.	AS Aixois (7)	4–0	Cosnac FC (11)

=== Franche-Comté ===
All but one of these matches were played on 27 and 28 August 2016. The final game was played on 7 September 2016.

Second round results: Franche-Comté

Tie no	Home team (tier)	Score	Away team (tier)
1.	AS Fougerolles (9)	1–5	AS Baume-les-Dames (6)
2.	Entente Sud-Revermont (8)	1–2	AS Levier (6)
3.	AS Luxeuil (8)	5–0	ASL Autechaux-Roide (9)
4.	FC Giro-Lepuix (8)	0–1	AS Danjoutin-Andelnans-Méroux (9)
5.	US Montbéliardaise (8)	0–1	AS Bavilliers (8)
6.	US Franchevelle (10)	1–3	AS Audincourt (8)
7.	SC Clémenceau Besançon (6)	1–0	FC Vesoul (7)
8.	Jura Lacs Foot (7)	2–0	Jura Nord Foot (8)
9.	Bresse Jura Foot (6)	5–0	US Coteaux de Seille (7)
10.	US Larians-et-Munans (8)	8–1	FC Val de Loue (9)
11.	AS Orchamps-Vennes (7)	1–2	ES Pays Maîchois (8)
12.	FC Bart (7)	3–2	AS Belfort Sud (7)
13.	Olympique Courcelles-lès-Montbéliard (10)	1–2	Olympique Montbéliard (9)
14.	AS Hérimoncourt (9)	0–2	US Pont-de-Roide (6)
15.	US Aillevillers (9)	3–7	US Sochaux (7)
16.	FC Pays Minier (10)	0–2	JS Lure (8)
17.	SG Héricourt (8)	3–2	AS Méziré-Fesches-le-Châtel (7)
18.	Bessoncourt Roppe Club Larivière (10)	0–2	FC Grandvillars (6)
19.	FC Villars-sous-Écot (9)	1–2	AS Mélisey-St Barthélemy (8)
20.	FC Pirey-École-Valentin (9)	1–7	Entente Roche-Novillars (6)
21.	AS Mont D'Usiers (9)	0–4	ES Entre Roches (8)
22.	ES Charquemont (10)	0–7	FC Valdahon-Vercel (7)
23.	CS Portusien (9)	2–1	US Rioz-Étuz-Cussey (7)
24.	Haute-Lizaine Pays d'Héricourt (8)	1–1 (4–5 p)	PS Besançon (6)
25.	FC Noidanais (7)	3–1	AS Sâone-Mamirolle (8)
26.	US Colombier-Fontaine (8)	1–2	US St Vit (6)
27.	US Les Fontenelles (12)	0–7	ES Doubs (10)
28.	ASC Soma Tsara Mahoraise (10)	3–4 (a.e.t.)	AS Château de Joux (8)
29.	Rougement Concorde (10)	1–4	US Les Écorces (8)
30.	Amancey-Bolandoz-Chantrans Foot (10)	0–2	FC Champagnole (6)
31.	AS Foucherans (8)	2–1	AEP Pouilly-les-Vignes (8)
32.	FC Damparis (8)	3–3 (9–8 p)	ES Marnaysienne (9)
33.	FC Plaine 39 (10)	3–2	Triangle d'Or Jura Foot (7)
34.	FC 4 Rivières 70 (7)	4–1	AS Morbier (8)
35.	ASPTT Grand-Lons-Jura (11)	0–8	Jura Dolois Foot (6)
36.	FC Montfaucon-Morre-Gennes-La Vèze (7)	1–0	ES Dannemarie (8)
37.	Drugeon Sports (11)	1–1 (4–3 p)	FC Aiglepierre (10)
38.	FC L'Isle-sur-le-Doubs (7)	3–1	AS Nord Territoire (10)

=== Languedoc-Roussillon ===
These matches were played on 27 and 28 August and 4 September 2016.

Second round results: Languedoc-Roussillon

Tie no	Home team (tier)	Score	Away team (tier)
1.	US Garons (11)	0–6	FC Bagnols Pont (6)
2.	Ille-sur-Têt FC (8)	5–1	FC St Cyprien-Latour (8)
3.	CO Castelnaudary (7)	2–2 (5–4 p)	FC Vallée du Lauquet (8)
4.	AS Prades (9)	0–6	OC Perpignan (6)
5.	Perpignan FC Bas-Vernet (7)	2–0	ASC St Nazaire (11)
6.	FC Le Soler (8)	0–6	Canet Roussillon FC (6)
7.	MJC Gruissan (7)	1–5	FU Narbonne (6)
8.	AS St Martin Montpellier (8)	0–3	AS Frontignan AC (6)
9.	RSO Cournonterral (11)	0–11	AS Lattoise (6)
10.	ES Arzens (9)	2–5	FA Carcassonne (6)
11.	FC Vauverdois (8)	0–7	US Salinières Aigues Mortes (6)
12.	FC Laurentin (7)	0–2	FC Alberes Argelès (6)
13.	Olympique Alenya (8)	4–2	Elne FC (6)
14.	USO Florensac-Pinet (9)	1–2	Castelnau Le Crès FC (6)
15.	AS Gignacaise (7)	4–2	Stade Balarucois (7)
16.	SC Manduellois (10)	0–2	GC Uchaud (7)
17.	Besseges-St Ambroix FC (9)	1–6	Marvejols Sports (7)
18.	FCO Domessargues (10)	0–6	ES Pays d'Uzes (7)
19.	RC Générac (8)	1–3	JS Chemin Bas d'Avignon (7)
20.	AS Le Malzieu (11)	0–12	AS Rousson (7)
21.	GS Gardois (10)	2–7	SC Anduzien (7)
22.	Olympique Maraussanais Biterrois (11)	1–9	AS Atlas Paillade (7)
23.	Razès Olympique (8)	2–3 (a.e.t.)	Haut-Minervois Olympique (8)
24.	US Conques (7)	20–0	FC Malepère (9)
25.	Limoux-Pieusse FC (9)	1–2	USA Pezens (8)
26.	FC Pennautier (10)	3–5	ES Ste Eulalie-Villesèquelande (8)
27.	UF Lézignanais (7)	1–2	US Minervois (8)
28.	Olympic Cuxac-d'Aude (9)	0–7	Trèbes FC (7)
29.	Olympique Moussan-Montredon (8)	3–2	Omnisport St Papoul (8)
30.	FC Villedubert (9)	3–0	FC St Nazairois (9)
31.	FC St Estève (7)	1–0	Si T'Es Sport Perpignan (8)
32.	BECE FC Vallée de l'Aigly (8)	2–3	AS Perpignan Méditerranée (7)
33.	US Bompas (8)	7–2	Les Amis de Cédric Brunier (12)
34.	AC Alignanais (9)	3–3 (3–2 p)	AS Canétoise (8)
35.	FC Lamalou (9)	1–2	Entente Corneilhan-Lignan (10)
36.	Baillargues-St Brès-Valergues (8)	1–4	Olympique La Peyrade FC (8)
37.	ES Cœur Hérault (10)	2–2 (4–5 p)	US Villeveyracoise (10)
38.	FC Pradéen (10)	1–0	FC Lavérune (9)
39.	AS Montarnaud-St Paul-Vaihauques-Murviel (8)	9–0	RC Lemasson Montpellier (11)
40.	US Montagnacoise (9)	1–0	FC Petit Bard (7)
41.	AS Puissalicon-Magalas (9)	10–2	ASC Paillade Mercure (11)
42.	US Mauguio Carnon (8)	0–1	Pointe Courte AC Sète (9)
43.	FO Sud Hérault (10)	3–2	ROC Social Sète (10)
44.	RC St Georges-d'Orques (9)	8–1	ASP Teyran (11)
45.	SO Aimargues (7)	2–2 (9–8 p)	FC Sussargues-Berange (10)
46.	US Monoblet (8)	3–1	ES Trois Moulins (10)
47.	ESC Le Buisson (9)	6–1	ES St Bauzély (9)
48.	AS Badaroux (9)	11–0	Entente Fournels-Nasbinals (13)
49.	Entente Chirac-Le Monastier (11)	1–7	AS St Privat-des-Vieux (8)
50.	OM Pontil-Pradel (11)	0–5	AS St Georges-de-Lévéjac (10)
51.	Omnisports St Hilaire-La Jasse (9)	1–4	AS Nîmes Athletic (8)
52.	Stade Beaucairois (7)	3–2 (a.e.t.)	CO Soleil Levant Nîmes (7)
53.	AS Caissargues (9)	2–1	AS Vaunage (11)
54.	FC Val de Cèze (7)	5–4	FC La Calmette (11)
55.	AS Poulx (9)	4–2	FC Canabier (8)
56.	GC Gallarguois (9)	1–4	FC Chusclan-Laudun-l'Ardoise (8)
57.	AS St Paulet (9)	4–2	OC Redessan (9)
58.	Entente Perrier Vergèze (8)	0–3	AEC St Gilles (7)
59.	ES Suménoise (10)	1–0	RC St Laurent-des-Arbres (10)
60.	FC Maurin (9)	0–10	Entente St Clément-Montferrier (6)
61.	US Lunel-Vielloise (9)	1–13	CE Palavas (6)
62.	GC Lunel (7)	2–1	Arceaux Montpellier (7)
63.	Olympique St-André-de-Sangonis (7)	0–1	La Clermontaise Football (7)
64.	SC Cers-Portiragnes (8)	1–1 (4–5 p)	US Béziers (8)
65.	US Villeneuvoise (10)	2–1 (a.e.t.)	PI Vendargues (7)
66.	RC Vedasien (9)	1–1 (4–2 p)	Mèze Stade FC (7)
67.	UFC Aimargues (10)	5–3	AFC Nîmes Jeunes Mayotte (11)
68.	FC Briolet (7)	4–0	AS Bram (10)

=== Maine ===
These matches were played on 28 August 2016.

Second round results: Maine

Tie no	Home team (tier)	Score	Away team (tier)
1.	US Aronnaise (7)	0–4	CA Evronnais (8)
2.	AS Martigné-sur-Mayenne (11)	2–2 (4–1 p)	USC Pays de Montsurs (9)
3.	CS St Pierre-des-Landes (10)	1–2	AS Contest-St Baudelle (10)
4.	FC Pays de Sillé (9)	2–1	Gorron FC (9)
5.	US Cigné (10)	4–2	CA Voutréen (11)
6.	Hermine St Ouennaise (8)	1–4	Stade Mayennais FC (6)
7.	FA Laval Bonne Lorraine (10)	1–0	ASPTT Laval (11)
8.	Ernéenne Foot (8)	1–0	AS Andouillé (9)
9.	ASL L'Huisserie Foot (8)	1–5	ES Bonchamp (6)
10.	FC La Selle-Craonnaise (11)	0–4	US Entrammes (9)
11.	US Le Genest (9)	0–7	US St Berthevin (7)
12.	FC Château-Gontier (9)	3–0	US Dyonisienne (10)
13.	US Forcé (9)	0–4	AS Bourny Laval (6)
14.	US Méral-Cossé (8)	2–1	Alerte Ahuillé FC (9)
15.	JA Soulgé-sur-Ouette (10)	4–0	AG Laigné (10)
16.	FC Ruillé-Loiron (9)	0–1	Ancienne Château-Gontier (6)
17.	ES Quelainaise (9)	1–2	ES Craon (8)
18.	US Argentré (11)	0–2	US Laval (8)
19.	AS St Pavace (8)	1–2	US Arnage Pontlieue (7)
20.	FC Val du Loir (10)	1–2	US Bazouges-Cré (7)
21.	SC Tuffé (10)	2–4	SA Mamertins (6)
22.	AS Sargéenne (11)	1–3	ES Connerré (6)
23.	US Roézé (8)	1–4	Écommoy FC (6)
24.	US La Chapelle-St-Rémy (10)	3–2	SO Maine (7)
25.	CO Laigné-St Gervais (10)	0–10	AS Mulsanne-Teloché (6)
26.	La Vigilante Mayet (10)	0–3	AS Le Mans Villaret (7)
27.	US Précigné (11)	0–6	La Suze FC (6)
28.	AS St Jean-d'Assé (10)	0–1	CO St Saturnin Arche (6)
29.	UC Auvers-Poillé (10)	2–3	JS Coulaines (6)
30.	US Crosmièroise (10)	1–3	ES Moncé (7)
31.	JS Parigné-l'Évêque (8)	2–2 (7–8 p)	US Guécélard (6)
32.	ASPTT Le Mans (10)	1–5	Patriote Brulonnaise (7)
33.	US Mansigné (10)	6–4	AS La Chapelle-St-Aubin (8)
34.	CO Castélorien (9)	2–1	CS Sablons-Gazonfier (9)
35.	AS Ruaudin (10)	1–0	US Glonnières (8)
36.	Beaumont SA (9)	4–0	US Vibraysienne (9)
37.	FC La Bazoge (10)	1–3	US Bouloire (10)
38.	OS Dollon (10)	0–10	US Nautique Spay (8)
39.	La Patriote Bonnétable (8)	1–4	EG Rouillon (9)
40.	SS Noyen-sur-Sarthe (8)	1–0	CS Changé (9)
41.	JS Solesmienne (10)	1–3	US St Mars-la-Brière (8)
42.	AS Oisseau (11)	1–1 (4–2 p)	FC Ambrières (10)
43.	US Pré-en-Pail (11)	1–2	Louverné Sports (7)
44.	AS Chédouet (11)	0–3	VS Fertois (6)

=== Midi-Pyrénées ===
The second round in Midi-Pyrénées is organised by individual districts. The matches were played on 26, 27, 28 and 30 August 2016. Second round results: Midi-Pyrénées

Second round results: Midi-Pyrénées, District de l'Ariège

Tie no	Home team (tier)	Score	Away team (tier)
1.	Entente Varilhes/St Jean-de-Verges (10)	1–5	FC Pamiers (8)
2.	ES St Jean-du-Falga (8)	1–1 (4–3 p)	ES Fossatoise (8)
3.	FC St Girons (10)	2–1	FC Mirepoix (10)
4.	Un Jeune Avenir (12)	3–0	AS Rieux-de-Pelleport (9)
5.	FC Pays d'Olmes (10)	1–5	FC Foix (7)

Second round results: Midi-Pyrénées, District de l'Aveyron

Tie no	Home team (tier)	Score	Away team (tier)
1.	Entente St Georges/St Rome (9)	4–0	US Laissac Bertholène (10)
2.	US Dourdou (11)	1–6	Ségala-Rieupeyroux-Salvetat (9)
3.	SO Millau (9)	1–0	US Pays Rignacoise (8)
4.	JS Bassin Aveyron (9)	9–0	Entente Campuac-Golinhac-Espeyrac (9)
5.	FC Agen-Gages (10)	1–4	FC Naucellois (9)
6.	US Pays Alzuréen (11)	1–3	Druelle FC (8)
7.	US Bas Rouergue (9)	1–2	Vallée du Lot Capdenac (9)
8.	FC Val d'Assou (11)	3–0	CS Sévérac (8)
9.	SC Sébazac (9)	2–0	US Espalion (10)
10.	Méridienne FC (11)	0–4	Stade Villefranchois (8)
11.	Association St Laurentaise Cantonale Canourguaise (10)	0–2	Stade St Affricain (8)
12.	ASC Mahorais (12)	2–1 (a.e.t.)	FC Monastère (9)
13.	Foot Vallon (9)	1–1 (5–4 p)	AS Olemps (10)

Second round results: Midi-Pyrénées, District de Haute-Garonne Comminges

Tie no	Home team (tier)	Score	Away team (tier)
1.	Bagnères Luchon Sports (10)	1–3 (a.e.t.)	ERCSO L'Isle-en-Dodon (8)
2.	FC Mabroc (10)	1–0	US Salies-du-Salat/Mane/St Martory (8)
3.	EFC Aurignac (9)	1–0	Pyrénées Sud Comminges (10)
4.	Comminges St Gaudens (9)	0–2	US Cazères (7)

Second round results: Midi-Pyrénées, District du Gers

Tie no	Home team (tier)	Score	Away team (tier)
1.	FC L'Isle-Jourdain (9)	2–1	Ste Christie-Preignan AS (9)
2.	SC St Clar (10)	0–4	AS Fleurance-La Sauvetat (7)
3.	US Aignanaise (10)	2–0	SC Solomiacais (10)
4.	Eauze FC (10)	3–0	Sud Astarac 2010 (10)
5.	FC Risclois (11)	0–4	FC Pavien (9)

Second round results: Midi-Pyrénées, District des Hautes-Pyrénées

Tie no	Home team (tier)	Score	Away team (tier)
1.	Galan FC (10)	2–4	Juillan OS (8)
2.	UST Nouvelles Vauge (9)	0–3	Séméac OFC (7)
3.	FC Plateau (10)	0–1	Elan Pyrénéen Bazet-Bordères-Lagarde (9)
4.	Soues Cigognes FC (9)	1–2	AS Argelès-Lavedan (9)
5.	FC Val d'Adour (10)	0–7	FC Lourdais XI (7)
6.	ASC Barbazan-Debat (10)	0–0 (4–3 p)	Quand Même Orleix (7)

Second round results: Midi-Pyrénées, District du Lot

Tie no	Home team (tier)	Score	Away team (tier)
1.	FC Haut Quercy (10)	2–5	Cahors FC (8)
2.	Élan Marivalois (9)	3–2	FC Bégoux-Arcambal (10)
3.	AS Causse Limargue (10)	2–1	FC Lalbenque-Fontanes (9)
4.	Figeac Quercy (9)	4–1	Val Roc Foot (9)
5.	FC Biars-Bretenoux (9)	7–1	ES Souillac-Cressenac-Gignac (9)
6.	Entente Cajarc Cenevières (11)	1–4 (a.e.t.)	AS Montcabrier (10)

Second round results: Midi-Pyrénées, District du Tarn

Tie no	Home team (tier)	Score	Away team (tier)
1.	AS Giroussens (9)	0–2	FC Graulhet (9)
2.	Roquecourbe FC (9)	1–3	FC Pays Mazamétain (8)
3.	ASPTT Albi (9)	0–3	FC Marssac-Rivières-Senouillac Rives du Tarn (7)
4.	Cambounet FC (9)	0–0 (2–4 p)	US Carmaux (8)
5.	Olympique Lautrec (10)	1–2	St Juéry OF (8)
6.	US Gaillacois (9)	5–4 (a.e.t.)	FC Vignoble 81 (9)
7.	US St Sulpice (9)	6–1	SO St Amantais (10)
8.	AS Vallée du Sor (10)	2–1	Dourgne-Viviers (9)
9.	FC Labastide-de-Lévis (10)	2–0	Lavaur FC (8)
10.	FC Castelnau-de-Lévis (10)	1–2	US Castres (8)

Second round results: Midi-Pyrénées, District du Tarn-et-Garonne

Tie no	Home team (tier)	Score	Away team (tier)
1.	Stade Larrazet-Garganvillar (10)	0–2	AA Grisolles (7)
2.	Coquelicots Montéchois FC (10)	0–2	AS Bressols (9)
3.	Avenir Lavitois (10)	3–1	AS Stéphanoise (10)
4.	AS Mas-Grenier (9)	1–3 (a.e.t.)	Montauban AF (8)
5.	SC Lafrancaisain (9)	2–1	FC Les 2 Ponts (10)
6.	Montauban FCTG (7)	5–1	Cazes Olympique (8)

Second round results: Midi-Pyrénées, District de Haut-Garonne

Tie no	Home team (tier)	Score	Away team (tier)
1.	Toulouse Rangueil FC (10)	0–1	JS Carbonne (9)
2.	US Pibrac (7)	2–2 (5–4 p)	US Plaisance (9)
3.	AS Castelnau-d'Estrétefonds (8)	1–3	St Orens FC (8)
4.	RC Eaunes (11)	1–2	Baziège OC (8)
5.	FC Launaguet (8)	2–4	Beaupuy-Montrabé-St Jean FC (7)
6.	AS Tournefeuille (7)	0–0 (5–6 p)	Étoile Aussonnaise (7)
7.	US Seysses-Frouzins (8)	5–1	AS Mondonville (9)
8.	Toulouse ACF (8)	3–0	US Auriacaise (10)
9.	AS L'Union (7)	1–0	Toulouse Olympique Aviation Club (9)
10.	AS Flourens-Drémil-Lafage (12)	1–4	JS Toulouse Pradettes (8)
11.	US Riveraine (12)	0–2	ES St Simon (8)
12.	AS Portet-Carrefour-Récébédou (7)	4–1	FC Beauzelle (8)
13.	Avenir Fonsorbais (7)	4–0	AS Toulouse Mirail (7)
14.	US Léguevin (10)	1–3	JE Toulousaine Croix-Daurade (12)
15.	UA Fenouillet (8)	1–1 (2–3 p)	Bruguières SC (11)
16.	JS Cugnaux (8)	10–0	AS Izards (11)
17.	Inter FC (10)	1–0	US Pouvourville (10)
18.	US Castelginest (8)	0–2	Lauragais FC (9)
19.	Juventus de Papus (7)	9–1	Toulouse Football Compans Caffarelli (12)

=== Aquitaine ===
These matches were played on 3 and 4 September 2016.

Second round results: Aquitaine

Tie no	Home team (tier)	Score	Away team (tier)
1.	AS Pontonx (9)	4–1	US Roquefort (9)
2.	FC La Ribère (9)	1–2	Biscarrosse OFC (7)
3.	FC Medoc Ocean (9)	1–2 (a.e.t.)	FC des Graves (7)
4.	FC Cendrieux-La Douze (11)	2–1	Prigonrieux FC (8)
5.	Stade Ygossais (8)	1–3 (a.e.t.)	SA Mauléonais (9)
6.	AS Bretagne-de-Marsan (11)	3–0	FC Luy du Béarn (8)
7.	FC Doazit (9)	4–0	Gars d'Albret Labrit (10)
8.	Carresse Salies FC (11)	0–7	ES Montoise (9)
9.	JAB Pau (9)	0–1	Pardies Olympique (8)
10.	AS Artix (9)	3–2 (a.e.t.)	US St Medard CU (10)
11.	FC Vallée de l'Ousse (10)	0–2	Elan Boucalais (7)
12.	US St Michel Arudy (10)	3–0	FC Oloronais (7)
13.	Chalosse FC (11)	1–8	Seignosse-Capbreton-Soutsons FC (9)
14.	FC des Enclaves et du Plateau (11)	5–3	FA Bourbaki Pau (9)
15.	SA St Severin (9)	1–4	Avenir Mourenxois (7)
16.	Croisés St André Bayonne (7)	1–1 (4–3 p)	Arin Luzien (7)
17.	Marensin FC (10)	1–3	FC Lescar (8)
18.	Hasparren FC (9)	5–1	SC St Pierre-du-Mont (8)
19.	Union Jurançonnaise (11)	3–5 (a.e.t.)	Hiriburuko Ainhara (8)
20.	FREP St Vincent-de-Paul (11)	1–10	FA Morlaàs est Béarn (7)
21.	ES Meillon-Assat-Narcastet (8)	3–1	US Portugais Pau (9)
22.	AS Mazères-Uzos-Rontignon (9)	0–1	St Paul Sport (7)
23.	AS Tarnos (10)	3–4	Bleuets Pau (8)
24.	RC Chambéry (10)	1–2	FC St André-de-Cubzac (8)
25.	AGJA Caudéran (9)	6–3	SC St Symphorien (10)
26.	Entente Boé Bon-Encontre (9)	3–1 (a.e.t.)	SC Cadaujac (10)
27.	La Brède FC (7)	1–0	FC des Portes de l'Entre-Deux-Mers (7)
28.	AS Montferrandaise (12)	1–6	CA Carbon Blanais (10)
29.	Bordeaux AC (11)	2–4	AS Facture-Biganos Boïens (9)
30.	ES Eysinaise (8)	1–0	Union St Bruno (9)
31.	SC Monségur (11)	3–1 (a.e.t.)	CM Floirac (8)
32.	CA Sallois (10)	0–4	FC Izon-Vayres (8)
33.	CS Lantonnais (10)	0–1	Coqs Rouges Bordeaux (7)
34.	Andernos Sport FC (9)	1–0	FC St Médard-en-Jalles (7)
35.	AS Le Haillan (11)	3–0	AS Villandraut-Préchac (10)
36.	SC Aresien (11)	3–3 (4–3 p)	CA Pondaurat (9)
37.	Sud Gironde FC (11)	0–5	CS Portugais Villenave-d'Ornon (9)
38.	SC Bastidienne (10)	2–0	FC Gradignan (11)
39.	CA St Hélène (8)	0–0 (4–2 p)	Stade St Médardais (8)
40.	RC Bordeaux Métropole (8)	3–3 (4–1 p)	ES Bruges (8)
41.	Targon-Soulignac FC (9)	2–1	FC Gironde La Réole (10)
42.	AS Nontron-St Pardoux (9)	2–4	ES Boulazac (7)
43.	ASSA Pays du Dropt (9)	2–3 (a.e.t.)	Joyeuse St Sulpice-et-Cameyrac (10)
44.	FC Loubesien (10)	1–3	Colayrac FC (8)
45.	AF Casseneuil-Pailloles-Lédat (10)	1–0	FC Grand Emilionnais (7)
46.	US Creysse-Lembras (11)	0–2	US St Denis-de-Pile (10)
47.	AS Antonne-Le Change (8)	2–0	FC Villeneuve-sur-Lot (8)
48.	US Port Ste Marie-Feugarolles (10)	3–1	US Galgonnaise (10)
49.	AS Gensac-Montcaret (9)	4–3 (a.e.t.)	AS Neuvic St Léon (10)
50.	US La Catte (8)	1–1 (3–0 p)	La Thibérienne (9)
51.	Les Aiglons Razacois (10)	0–2	AS Pays de Montaigne et Gurçon (10)
52.	AS Taillan (9)	1–0	FC Hourtin-Naujac (10)
53.	USJ St Augustin Club Pyrénées Aquitaine (10)	4–2	AS Beautiran (11)
54.	Patronage Bazadais (10)	4–0	ES Canéjan (8)
55.	AS St Aubin-de-Médoc (10)	1–3	ES Blanquefort (7)
56.	US Illadaise (10)	3–2 (a.e.t.)	AS Pointe du Médoc (8)
57.	Vaillante Sportive Caudrot (9)	1–0	Montesquieu FC (9)
58.	US Alliance Talençaise (8)	1–0 (a.e.t.)	FC Martignas-Illac (8)
59.	Bouliacaise FC (12)	2–1	Sp Chantecler Bordeaux Nord-le-Lac (11)
60.	FC Pays Beaumontois (11)	3–2	AS Rouffignac-Plazac (9)
61.	ES Cours-de-Pile (12)	0–4	FC Coteaux Libournais (9)
62.	AS Pugnacaise (10)	0–2 (a.e.t.)	FC Sarlat-Marcillac (7)
63.	US Lagorce (12)	0–1	CO Coulouniex-Chamiers (8)
64.	SU Agen (7)	4–0	FC Thenon-Limeyrat-Fossemagne (8)
65.	US Mussidan-St Medard (9)	2–1 (a.e.t.)	CA Brantômais (10)
66.	Limens FC (9)	4–1	FC St Laurent d'Arce/St Gervais (10)
67.	FC Terrasson (10)	1–0	CA Ribéracois (10)
68.	FC Casteljaloux (11)	0–2	ES Audenge (8)
69.	Périgueux Foot (11)	3–6 (a.e.t.)	ES Montignacoise (10)

=== Atlantique ===
These matches were played on 4 September 2016.

Second round results: Atlantique

Tie no	Home team (tier)	Score	Away team (tier)
1.	St Joseph de Porterie Nantes (10)	1–2	Intrépide Angers Foot (8)
2.	St Pierre Mazières (10)	1–0	RC Doué-la-Fontaine (10)
3.	JA St Mars-du-Désert (9)	3–1 (a.e.t.)	Andrezé-Jub-Jallais FC (10)
4.	ES Gavraise (11)	0–2	Châtelais FC (11)
5.	US Loire et Divatte (8)	1–2	Flochamont Sèvre Football (8)
6.	Doutre SC (11)	0–1	St Vincent LUSTVI (11)
7.	FC Chavagnes-La Rabatelière (11)	3–0	US Chauché (9)
8.	Pornic Foot (9)	4–1	AS Sautronnaise (8)
9.	LS Ste Flaive des Loups (11)	1–0	ES Longevillaise (11)
10.	AS Longeron-Torfou (11)	4–2	AFC Bouin-Bois-de-Céné-Châteauneuf (12)
11.	Union St Leger-St Germain-Champtocé (11)	0–3	AS Bayard-Saumur (8)
12.	FC Sud Vilaine (11)	0–4	La Malouine Football (9)
13.	US Suplice André Mormaison (10)	0–1	FC Retz (10)
14.	Stade Olonnais (9)	2–1	Elan Sorinières Football (8)
15.	AS Mésanger (12)	0–2	Etoile de Clisson (9)
16.	US Michelaise et Triolaise (11)	1–3	Mareuil SC (8)
17.	AS Guillaumois (12)	1–4	FC Brennois Boiséen (9)
18.	JA Villemoisan (11)	1–3	Croix Blanche Angers (8)
19.	AS Marsacais (12)	0–3	US Varades (10)
20.	AS Sion Lusanger (12)	1–2	St Venant SF (9)
21.	FC3M (11)	2–3	SA St Florent-des-Bois (11)
22.	ES Le Puy-Vaudelnay (12)	0–2	ES Belligné-Chapelle-Maumusson (9)
23.	JF St Prouant-Monsireigne (11)	1–4	US Toutlemonde Maulévrier (11)
24.	ASVR Ambillou-Château (11)	2–5	FC Fuilet-Chaussaire (10)
25.	FC Fief Gesté (11)	5–1	Le Cellier Mauves FC (12)
26.	FC La Montagne (10)	1–3	JSC Bellevue Nantes (7)
27.	US Bernardière-Cugand (10)	1–2	Landreau-Loroux OSC (11)
28.	CCS Nantes St Félix (12)	0–2 (a.e.t.)	FC Ingrandes-Le Fresne (11)
29.	RS Ardelay (9)	3–4	Luçon FC (7)
30.	Sympho Foot Treillières (10)	1–2 (a.e.t.)	USA Pouancé (8)
31.	EM Sallertaine (13)	1–7	St Marc Football (11)
32.	SC Nord Atlantique (10)	0–6	St Aubin-Guérande Football (7)
33.	EF Cheffois-St Maurice (9)	3–1	ASAG La Haye-Fouassière (8)
34.	Stade Couëronnais FC (12)	1–2	FC Castel-Fiacrais (10)
35.	FC Bouaye (9)	0–2	ESOF La Roche-sur-Yon (7)
36.	LSG Les Brouzils (9)	2–2 (5–3 p)	AC Chapelain Foot (7)
37.	AS Lac de Maine (10)	2–2 (3–4 p)	FC Laurentais Landemontais (9)
38.	St Pierre Sportif Nieul-le-Dolent (10)	0–1	Entente Sud Vendée (11)
39.	Herbadilla Foot (11)	2–5 (a.e.t.)	EA La Tessoualle (9)
40.	JGE Sucé-sur-Erdre (9)	1–6	ASC St Médard-de-Doulon Nantes(9)
41.	ES Dresny-Plessé (10)	6–0	Espérance Crossac (11)
42.	US Vital Frossay (12)	1–1 (1–3 p)	St Joachim Brière Sports (11)
43.	Nozay OS (9)	0–2	AL Châteaubriant (8)
44.	FC Mesnilaurentais (12)	2–7	Christophe-Séguinière (10)
45.	USE Dompierroise (10)	2–4	La France d'Aizenay (8)
46.	ASR Machecoul (9)	1–0	FC Robretières La Roche-sur-Yon (7)
47.	AC Belle-Bielle (12)	3–2	CAS Possosavennières (10)
48.	Ste Foy FC (11)	0–1	ES Pineaux (10)
49.	CS Montoirin (9)	1–4	AS Vieillevigne-La Planche (8)
50.	US Autize Vendée (11)	2–1	FC Saligny (9)
51.	USC Corné (12)	0–1	ES Aubance (10)
52.	Montreuil-Juigné BF (10)	0–1	FE Trélazé (7)
53.	Energie Le May-sur-Èvre (9)	1–3	St Pierre de Retz (8)
54.	Coëx Olympique (10)	2–4	Élan de Gorges Foot (8)
55.	US Lucéene (9)	1–4	AS St Pierre-Montrevault (8)
56.	ES Grosbreuil (10)	1–2	Marsouins Brétigonllais Foot (8)
57.	Sud Vendée Football (8)	0–2	AS La Châtaigneraie (7)
58.	St Michel SF (12)	1–2 (a.e.t.)	AS Sud Loire (9)
59.	St Sébastien Profondine (12)	0–2	Pays de Chantonnay Foot (10)
60.	Étoile Mouzillon Foot (11)	1–2 (a.e.t.)	Vigilante St Fulgent (9)
61.	FC St Julien-Vairé (10)	3–2	FC Jard-Avrillé (9)
62.	Aiglons Durtalois (11)	1–4 (a.e.t.)	ES Blain (9)
63.	ES Marais (10)	3–1	FC Mouzeil-Teillé-Ligné (9)
64.	St André-St Macaire FC (10)	0–1	ASI Mûrs-Erigné (8)
65.	FC Grand Lieu (10)	2–5	FC Essartais (7)
66.	AS La Madeleine (11)	2–2 (4–5 p)	La Saint André (9)
67.	Métallo Sport Chantenaysien (9)	0–1	FC Achards (8)
68.	Olympique Chemillé-Melay (8)	0–5	GS St Sébastien (7)
69.	ES La Pouëze (10)	0–5	ES Bouchemaine (7)
70.	AF Trémentines (12)	0–5	FC Cécilien Martinoyen (10)
71.	AS Ponts-de-Cé (10)	1–0	SC Angevin (8)
72.	AS La Salle-Coron (11)	2–7	FC Mouchamps-Rochetrejoux (9)
73.	St Médard St Mars-de-Coutais (13)	1–6	FC Loulaysien (10)
74.	FC Goelands Sanmaritains (12)	0–4	FC Guémené-Massérac (12)
75.	AC Basse-Goulaine (8)	2–0	AS Avrillé (9)
76.	FC Cantonal Sud Vendée (12)	2–3	US Aubigny (9)
77.	ES Côte de Lumière (8)	1–0 (a.e.t.)	Mouilleron SF (7)
78.	ES Maritime (9)	3–1	FC Chapelle-des-Marais (7)
79.	ES Montilliers (11)	3–0	JS du Layon (12)
80.	Donges FC (10)	1–2	ES Pornichet (9)
81.	Nort ACF (9)	0–0 (4–2 p)	Nantes La Mellinet (8)
82.	Bé-Léger FC (12)	2–3	AS St Mesmin (12)
83.	SomloirYzernay CPF (9)	2–2 (5–6 p)	FC Beaupréau (8)
84.	FC Val de Moine (11)	4–1	ASPTT-CAEB Cholet (9)
85.	ASC St Barthélémy-d'Anjou (11)	2–0	ES Val Baugeois (12)
86.	US Bequots-Lucquois (8)	0–2	US Philbertine Football (7)
87.	AS Tiercé-Cheffes (8)	0–2	AC Pouzauges-Réaumur (7)
88.	USJA St Martin-Aviré-Louvaine (12)	0–2	Abbaretz-Saffré FC (11)
89.	Entente St Lambert des Levées (12)	2–3	Football Chalonnes-Chaudefonds (10)
90.	FC Chabossière (10)	2–1	US La Baule-Le Pouliguen (7)
91.	FC Sud Sèvre et Maine (10)	2–1	ES St Denis-la-Chevasse (9)
92.	AS Bouffére (9)	0–2	US Beaufort-en-Valée (8)
93.	US Herminoise (10)	0–2	FC Mouilleron-Thouarsais-Caillère (8)
94.	FF Mortagne-sur-Sèvre (11)	2–1	FC Portguais Cholet (11)
95.	CA Voubantais/US Glainoise (11)	0–7	US Thouaré (8)
96.	SC Avessac-Fégréac (12)	4–0	Océane FC (12)
97.	Olympique Liré-Drain (9)	0–5	Angers Vaillante Foot (7)
98.	FC Villevêque-Soucelles (12)	1–2	JF Cholet (11)
99.	ES Vigneux (9)	0–2	USJA Carquefou (7)
100.	NDC Angers (8)	3–2	UF St Herblain (7)
101.	US Bournezeau-St Hilaire (10)	3–2 (a.e.t.)	La Chaize FEC (7)
102.	FC Bourgneuf-en-Retz (12)	3–3 (5–6 p)	FC Toutes Aides Nantes (12)
103.	US Pellerinaise (13)	4–0	Arche FC (12)
104.	Hermitage Venansault (12)	1–0	USM Beauvoir-sur-Mer (11)
105.	US Maze (10)	2–0	AS St Sylvain-d'Anjou (11)

=== Méditerranée ===
These matches were played on 4 September 2016.

Second round results: Méditerranée

Tie no	Home team (tier)	Score	Away team (tier)
1.	US Les Mées (8)	0–1	Gap Foot 05 (7)
2.	US Veynoise SNCF (8)	4–1	AS Valensole Gréoux (9)
3.	EP Manosque (8)	0–1	Espérance Pernoise (6)
4.	ES Haute-Siagne (11)	1–2	FC Vidauban (9)
5.	AS Cannes (6)	2–0	UA Valettoise (7)
6.	FC Carros (8)	0–3	RO Menton (6)
7.	Stade Laurentin (9)	0–1	JS St Jean-Beaulieu (6)
8.	ES Baous (9)	1–3	US Mandelieu-La Napoule (7)
9.	FC Antibes (8)	2–1	SC Mouans-Sartoux (7)
10.	AS Fontonne (8)	1–2	US Cap d'Ail (7)
11.	ES Villeneuve-Loubet (10)	3–1	EC Madeleine Victorine (10)
12.	US Biot (11)	0–5	AS Estérel (8)
13.	Montet Bornala Club Nice (9)	1–0	AS Roquebrune-Cap-Martin (8)
14.	AS Traminots Alpes Maritimes (11)	0–7	US Pegomas (8)
15.	AS Étoile du Sud (8)	4–1	AFC St Tulle-Pierrevert (7)
16.	AS Forcalquier (8)	1–9	AS St Rémoise (6)
17.	CA Plan-de-Cuques (8)	1–3	US Marseille Endoume (6)
18.	AS Martigues Sud (8)	1–2	FC Rousset Ste Victoire (7)
19.	COC Amicale St Just (9)	2–2 (2–4 p)	SC Courthézon (7)
20.	FC Septèmes (9)	0–6	US 1er Canton Marseille (7)
21.	JO St Gabriel (10)	0–1	SC Montredon Bonneveine (8)
22.	ASCJ Félix Pyat (9)	0–1	Berre SC (7)
23.	ES Milloise (9)	3–1	ES La Ciotat (7)
24.	FC La Soude (10)	0–3	AS Vallon des Tuves / FC Savinoise (9)
25.	SO Cassis (10)	3–3 (4–2 p)	US Trets (10)
26.	Stade Marseillais UC (7)	2–3	AC Arlésien (7)
27.	Étoile Huveaune (9)	0–2	Stade Maillanais (8)
28.	FC La Ciotat-Ceyreste (10)	2–4	US Venelles (9)
29.	USPEG Marseille (10)	1–3	FSC La Ciotat (9)
30.	USR Pertuis (10)	1–4	Boxland Club Islois (8)
31.	Olympic Barbentane (8)	0–1	FC Côte Bleue (6)
32.	Espérance Gordienne (12)	2–1	US Eygalières (9)
33.	ARC Cavaillon (9)	0–0 (4–1 p)	SC Montfavet (8)
34.	US Caderousse (10)	1–5	Olympique Rovenain (7)
35.	US St Didier (9)	0–2	FA Val Durance (7)
36.	AC Vedene (8)	1–4	AS Gardanne (7)
37.	ES Pierredon Mouriès (10)	2–3	US Thoroise (11)
38.	SC Jonquières (9)	2–1	FCAS Drôme-Provence (10)
39.	AS Camaretois (9)	0–2	FC Istres (7)
40.	US Autre Provence (10)	2–1	Entente St Jean du Gres (9)
41.	US St Saturninoise (11)	3–3 (1–4 p)	Avenir Club Avignonnais (11)
42.	FA Châteaurenard (9)	1–6	Espérance Sorguaise (9)
43.	SC Cogolin (9)	0–4	Salon Bel Air (6)
44.	SO Lavandou (9)	0–3	AS Maximoise (6)
45.	FCUS Tropézienne (8)	1–1 (5–3 p)	AS Gémenos (6)
46.	FC Grimaud (10)	1–0	FC Rocbaron (10)
47.	FC Pugetois (8)	1–2	CJ Antibes (8)
48.	Olympique St Maximinois (8)	2–0	Bormes Mimomas Sports (9)
49.	ES Aups-Régusse (10)	0–7	ES St Zacharie (7)
50.	Stade Transian (9)	1–2	Entente St Sylvestre Nice Nord (8)
51.	US St Mandrier (8)	2–1 (a.e.t.)	EUGA Ardziv (6)
52.	SC Tourves-Rougiers (9)	1–5	Gardia Club (8)
53.	JS Pennes Mirabeau (9)	3–0	AAS Val St André (9)
54.	FC Chateauneuf-les-Martigues (10)	0–6	US Carqueiranne-La Crau (7)
55.	ES Salin de Giraud (11)	2–2 (2–4 p)	Olympique Mallemortais (10)
56.	FC Sisteron (8)	0–2	Nyons FC (8)
57.	CA Digne 04 (8)	1–2	Carnoux FC (7)
58.	US Valbonne Sophia Antipolis (9)	1–2	AS Cagnes-Le Cros (7)
59.	SC Dracénie (7)	1–2	US Plan de Grasse (8)
60.	Olympique Novais (8)	1–4	FC Luberon (9)
61.	Luynes Sports (8)	0–8	ES Fosséenne (7)

=== Normandie ===
These matches were played on 4 September 2016.

Second round results: Normandie

Tie no	Home team (tier)	Score	Away team (tier)
1.	FC Sommery (11)	0–4	AS Plateau (8)
2.	RC Havrais (9)	1–3	AS Fauvillaise (6)
3.	FC Val de Risle (10)	2–3	Olympique Pavillais (7)
4.	US Conches (11)	1–4	GCO Bihorel (7)
5.	ASC Jiyan Kurdistan (10)	0–4	Romilly/Pont-St Pierre FC (6)
6.	Amicale Joseph Caulle (10)	0–6	FC St Étienne-du-Rovray (8)
7.	FC Nord Ouest (12)	1–2	ES Vallée de l'Oison (8)
8.	FAC Alizay (11)	0–3	FUSC Bois-Guillaume (6)
9.	AS Gournay-en-Bray (9)	1–2 (a.e.t.)	AS Mesnières-en-Bray (9)
10.	US Héricourt-en-Caux (10)	0–5	AS Routot (11)
11.	FC Seine-Eure (9)	0–5	FC Rouen (6)
12.	US Vatteville Brotonne (12)	0–5	US Bolbec (8)
13.	FC Barentinois (10)	1–2	Grand-Quevilly FC (6)
14.	FCI Bel Air (11)	0–5	CSSM Le Havre (8)
15.	AS Vallée de l'Andelle (11)	0–2	AS Madrillet Château Blanc (7)
16.	CA Pont-Audemer (9)	1–1 (2–4 p)	St Romain AC (6)
17.	FC Roumois Nord (10)	1–2 (a.e.t.)	CS Gravenchon (9)
18.	FC Epégard-Le Neubourg (8)	0–4	Stade Sottevillais CC (6)
19.	AS Fidelaire-Ferrière (11)	0–4	RC Caudebecais (8)
20.	US Godervillais (9)	3–1	Stade Valeriquais (10)
21.	CS Beaumont-le-Roger (10)	0–1	CO Cléon (8)
22.	US Auffay (11)	2–4	Mont-St-Aignan FC (8)
23.	St Sébastien Foot (9)	1–3	US Gasny (6)
24.	AS Val-de-Reuil/Vaudreuil/Poses (10)	2–3	CS Andelys (9)
25.	CS Lyonsais (14)	0–9	FC Gisors Vexin Normand (8)
26.	FC Avrais Nonancourt (9)	0–10	Pacy Ménilles RC (6)
27.	AS Andrésienne (13)	1–5	Stade Porte Normande Vernon (8)
28.	CS Ivry-la-Bataille (11)	0–9	Saint Marcel Foot (8)
29.	US St Germain-la-Campagne (12)	0–3	FC Serquigny-Nassandres (9)
30.	US Lyroise (10)	2–1	SC Breteuil-Francheville (12)
31.	ES Claville (12)	1–5	FC Illiers-l'Évêque (10)
32.	SC Thiberville (11)	4–2	AL St Michel Évreux (11)
33.	Club Andelle Pîtres (10)	2–3	ES Normanville (9)
34.	AS St Vigor-d'Ymonville (11)	1–4	US Tréfileries (7)
35.	US Cap de Caux (10)	2–3	Amicale Mixte des Neiges (7)
36.	Athleti'Caux FC (10)	0–3	USF Fécamp (7)
37.	AS Ste Adresse But (10)	2–8	Havre Caucriauville Sportif (8)
38.	Parc-d'Anxtot (12)	0–7	US Lillebonne (8)
39.	US Les Loges (11)	0–2	AS Montivilliers (9)
40.	FC Gruchet-le-Valasse (10)	0–10	ESM Gonfreville (6)
41.	SS Gournay (9)	0–9	SC Frileuse (6)
42.	Olympique Darnétal (10)	1–7	St Aubin FC (7)
43.	US Houppeville (10)	0–2	AL Déville-Maromme (6)
44.	EF Elbeuf (11)	1–3	FC Bonsecours-St Léger (8)
45.	ASPTT Rouen (11)	3–0 (Note: Amicale Houlmoise Bondevillaise FC penalised for breaking regulations regarding the composition of the matchday squad. ASPTT Rouen progress to the third round. Original scoreline 3–9.)	Amicale Houlmoise Bondevillaise FC (8)
46.	AS Ourville (9)	2–1	Cany FC (8)
47.	ES Aumaloise (10)	0–3	Eu FC (6)
48.	FC Ventois (11)	0–4	JS St Nicolas-d'Aliermont (7)
49.	US Doudeville (11)	1–3	US Luneraysienne (7)
50.	FC Fréville-Bouville SIVOM (10)	2–1	Boucle de Seine (8)
51.	US Grèges (11)	0–9	FC Offranville (8)
52.	US Normande 76 (11)	1–0	US Crielloise (11)
53.	St Aubin UFC (12)	0–2	ES Tourville (10)
54.	FC Copains d'Abord (14)	2–0	US Envermeu (11)
55.	Entente Vienne et Saâne (11)	0–4	Yvetot AC (7)
56.	ASC Bourg-Dun (11)	1–2	ES Arques (9)

=== Rhône-Alpes ===
These matches were played on 3 and 4 September 2016.

Second round results: Rhône-Alpes

Tie no	Home team (tier)	Score	Away team (tier)
1.	USF Tarare (11)	2–1	Chazay FC (9)
2.	FC Montrambert Ricamar (12)	0–6	AS Montchat Lyon (8)
3.	AS Bozel Mont Jovet (11)	4–3	AS Martinerois (9)
4.	Olympique de Valence (8)	1–1 (3–4 p)	AS Véore Montoison (8)
5.	US Annemasse (9)	9–0	AS Cornier (12)
6.	AG Bons-en-Chablais (11)	4–2	ES Sciez (10)
7.	FC Ballaison (9)	1–1 (4–3 p)	US Évian Lugrin (10)
8.	Valence FC (8)	5–1	Rhône Crussol Foot 07 (9)
9.	US Tenay (12)	1–2	SC Portes de l'Ain (8)
10.	AS Dardilly (11)	0–1	CS Neuville (8)
11.	FC Vuache (11)	1–4	FCS Rumilly Albanais (8)
12.	CS Cremeaux (11)	4–4 (4–3 p)	AS Noirétable (11)
13.	FC Rochetoirin (12)	0–6	FC Corbas (10)
14.	CS Châteauneuf-de-Galaure (12)	0–6	FC Péageois (8)
15.	ES Frans (10)	0–2	US Feillens (8)
16.	ES Seynod (9)	2–1	US Semnoz Vieugy (9)
17.	US Chatte (11)	2–4	AL St Maurice-l'Exil (9)
18.	Isle d'Abeau FC (10)	7–0	AS Novalaise (10)
19.	ES Izeaux (11)	2–7	AS Italienne Européenne Grenoble (10)
20.	ES Chanaz (11)	1–4	US Annecy-le-Vieux (8)
21.	FC Bourg-lès-Valence (10)	4–3	AS Cornas (10)
22.	AL Fleurie/Villié-Morgon (10)	1–5	FC Pontcharra-St Loup (9)
23.	FC des Collines (11)	1–4	ES Rachais (8)
24.	FC de la Dombes (11)	0–4	CS Viriat (8)
25.	ASM St Pierre-la-Palud (12)	2–6	Chambost-Allières-St Just-d'Avray (11)
26.	ES La Talaudière (9)	0–1	OC Ondaine (10)
27.	AS Grézieu-le-Marché (10)	0–7	US Millery-Vourles (8)
28.	FC St Étienne (11)	1–2	ES Veauche (8)
29.	FO Bourg (10)	3–0	FC Sain-Bel (10)
30.	AF Pays de Coise (10)	1–0	CS Meginand (8)
31.	AS Roussas-Granges-Gontardes (11)	1–2	ES Nord Drôme (11)
32.	FC Tarare (11)	1–4	Sud Azergues Foot (9)
33.	ES Sorbiers (10)	1–1 (3–1 p)	US Villerest (9)
34.	FC Ste Foy-lès-Lyon (10)	2–0	Forez Donzy FC (10)
35.	Riorges FC (10)	0–2	ES Lamurien (8)
36.	ES Montrondaise (11)	3–4	AS St Cyr-les-Vignes (11)
37.	Olympique Le Coteau (11)	1–0	US Ecotay-Moingt (12)
38.	US Chambost Lestra (11)	0–0 (3–4 p)	US Sud Forézienne (10)
39.	FC St Cyr-de-Favières	1–4	FC Commelle-Vernay (9)
40.	US Renaisonnaise Apchonnaise (11)	0–1	FC Roanne Clermont (9)
41.	US Filerin (11)	0–1	AS Chambéon-Magneux (9)
42.	Roanne Matel SFC (11)	2–1	Haute Brévenne Foot (9)
43.	Olympique Albertville FC (9)	1–5	JS Chambéry (8)
44.	FC Allobroges Asafia (9)	4–1	FC Veurey (10)
45.	FC Versoud (12)	0–4	Cognin Sports (9)
46.	CA Maurienne (10)	5–1	Entente Val d'Hyères (9)
47.	US Modane (11)	1–3	FC St Baldoph (9)
48.	FC Belle Étoile Mercury (10)	3–1	AS Ascropol (10)
49.	FC Chambotte (9)	1–2	ES Manival (8)
50.	FC St Michel-de-Maurienne (11)	2–4	ASL St Cassien (10)
51.	Le Grand-Lemps/Colombe/Apprieu Foot 38 (11)	0–4	FC Montmiral-Parnans (12)
52.	FC Clérieux-St Bardoux-Granges-les-Beaumont (13)	1–2	AS Dolon (11)
53.	AS Cheyssieu (12)	2–1	ASJF Domène (10)
54.	AS Vertrieu (11)	4–0	FC Seyssins (10)
55.	ASL Génissieux (12)	1–8	Entente Crest-Aouste (9)
56.	Olympique Montéléger (11)	1–3	OC Eybens (9)
57.	FC Crolles-Bernin (10)	3–2 (a.e.t.)	RC Mauves (10)
58.	EA Montvendre (12)	2–4	US Mours (9)
59.	CO Châteauneuvois (10)	2–1 (a.e.t.)	US St Paul-de-Varces (11)
60.	CS Miribel (12)	4–4 (5–4 p)	JS Montilienne (10)
61.	FC Larnage-Serves (11)	3–1 (a.e.t.)	Deux Rochers FC (10)
62.	SC Romans (10)	5–1	US Vallée du Jabron (10)
63.	CS Guinéens de l'Isère (13)	2–3 (a.e.t.)	SO Pont-de-Chéruy-Chavanoz (8)
64.	US Vals-les-Bains (12)	0–2	Olympique Ruomsois (8)
65.	US Divonne (8)	5–0	Olympique Cran (9)
66.	ES Tarentaise (8)	8–2	Annemasse Sud FC (9)
67.	FC Chéran (8)	7–1	AS Ugine (9)
68.	US Challex (11)	2–6	US Mont Blanc (9)
69.	AS Paremlan Villaz (12)	2–8	ES Chilly (9)
70.	FC Thônes (10)	3–1	JS Reignier (9)
71.	FC Les Houches-Servoz (13)	0–3	ES Fillinges (10)
72.	Haut Giffre FC (11)	3–1	FC Semine (11)
73.	FC Cessy-Gex (11)	0–1	ES Thyez (8)
74.	St Pierre SF (11)	0–3	ES Amancy (8)
75.	US Le Châble-Beaumont (11)	0–3	US St Julien-en-Genevois (10)
76.	CS La Balme-de-Sillingy (11)	2–1	ES Meythet (10)
77.	CSA Poisy (10)	2–0	SS Allinges (10)
78.	FC La Filière (12)	1–1 (4–3 p)	AS Sillingy (10)
79.	US Pers-Jussy (13)	2–3	ES Cernex (10)
80.	Association Portugais Oyonnax (13)	1–2	Ville-la-Grand FC (10)
81.	FC Aravis (13)	0–4	CSL Perrignier (12)
82.	FC Frangy (11)	3–4	Échenevex-Ségny-Chevry Olympique (10)
83.	US Veyziat (11)	3–5	US Grand Colombier (9)
84.	SEL St Priest-en-Jarez (9)	4–5	Entente Sarras Sports St Vallier (10)
85.	FC Châtelet (10)	2–3 (a.e.t.)	USG La Fouillouse (9)
86.	FC Bonson-St Cyprien (10)	1–2	US Villars (8)
87.	Football Mont-Pilat (9)	3–0	FC Serrières-Sablons (10)
88.	CO La Rivière (10)	1–3 (a.e.t.)	US Metare St Étienne Sud-Est (8)
89.	FCI St Romain-le-Puy (10)	1–4	US St Galmier-Chambœuf (8)
90.	AS Jonzieux (10)	1–4 (a.e.t.)	L'Étrat-La Tour Sportif (8)
91.	FC St Paul-en-Jarez (10)	2–7	AS Savigneux-Montbrison (8)
92.	FC Bourguisan (11)	3–1	SC Grand-Croix/Lorette (8)
93.	AS St Ferréol-Gampille-Firminy (12)	0–2	ES Haut Forez (11)
94.	ES St Jean-Bonnefonds (11)	3–2	SC St Sixte (12)
95.	JS Cellieu (11)	4–0	FC Bords de Loire (11)
96.	FC Périgneux (11)	0–4	Feyzin Club Belle Étoile (8)
97.	AJ Chapellois (11)	3–4 (a.e.t.)	US Davézieux-Vidalon (11)
98.	Bellegarde Sports (11)	2–0 (a.e.t.)	AS Aveizieux (12)
99.	FC St Charles Vigilante (11)	6–0	CS St Anthème (12)
100.	AS Portugaise Vaulx-en-Velin (11)	6–3	Olympique du Montcel (11)
101.	FC Gerland (10)	3–1	CS Ozon (10)
102.	Lou Football (12)	0–9	Sud Lyonnais Foot (8)
103.	SC Mille Etangs (12)	1–4	FC Val Lyonnais (8)
104.	FC Deux Fontaines (11)	2–2 (8–9 p)	Lyon Ouest SC (8)
105.	US Nantua (9)	2–2 (3–4 p)	AS Genay (10)
106.	Muroise Foot (11)	1–0	AS Craponne (9)
107.	CAS Cheminots Oullins Lyon (10)	2–0	AS Domarin (10)
108.	UO Tassin-la-Demi-Lune (10)	0–2	AS Villefontaine (11)
109.	AS Denicé (11)	0–3	US Meyzieu (9)
110.	Ménival FC (10)	4–2	AS Algerienne Villeurbanne (10)
111.	Olympique Les Avenières (13)	1–7	Union Nord Iséroise (11)
112.	AS Rhodanienne (10)	5–2	AS Portugaise Bourgoin-Jallieu (11)
113.	FC Franc Lyonnais (11)	1–3	FC Chaponnay-Marennes (8)
114.	FC Rive Droite (10)	3–1	Olympique Vaulx-en-Velin (9)
115.	AS Brignais (12)	1–3	CO St Fons (9)
116.	ES St Priest (9)	1–2	Olympique Nord Dauphiné (8)
117.	ES Genas Azieu (10)	0–4	CS Lagnieu (8)
118.	ASC Portugais St Fons (10)	1–2	US Reventin (11)
119.	AS Bellecour-Perrache (9)	0–1	US Venissieux (9)
120.	Football Côte St André (8)	1–0	Olympique Rhodia (8)
121.	FC Chabeuil (9)	1–0	AS Sud Ardèche (8)
122.	FC Portois (10)	1–2	US Portes Hautes Cévennes (8)
123.	US Jassans (10)	4–1	AS Attignat (11)
124.	AS Chaveyriat-Chanoz (11)	2–6	Olympique Belleroche Villefranche (9)
125.	Olympique St Denis-lès-Bourg (9)	3–1	ES Val de Saône (10)
126.	FC La Vallière (9)	1–3	ES Ambronay-St Jean-le-Vieux (11)
127.	AS Grièges-Pont-de-Veyle (11)	2–2 (4–3 p)	AS St Étienne-sur-Reyssouze (11)
128.	FC Priay (12)	3–4	ES Foissiat-Étrez (9)
129.	AS Sornins Réunis (11)	3–4	FC Bressans (9)
130.	ES Lierguois (10)	1–1 (3–4 p)	US Replonges (10)
131.	AS Peyrieu-Brens (13)	1–5	CA St Georges-de-Reneins (11)
132.	Entente Odenas-Charentay-St Lager (10)	0–2	ES Cormoranche (10)
133.	AS Bâgé-le-Châtel (10)	0–1	US Pont-de-Vaux-Arbigny (10)
134.	IF Barbières-Bésayes-Rochefort-Samson-Marches (13)	0–2	US Pont-La Roche (9)
135.	AS Homenetmen Bourg-lès Valence (11)	1–0	ES St Jeure-d'Ay-Marsan (12)
136.	FC Dingy (11)	4–2	Indépendante Blachèroise (12)
137.	FC Cheylarois (11)	0–3	FC Valdaine (9)
138.	AS Valensolles (11)	5–2	US Ancône (12)
139.	US St Martin-de-Valamas (12)	1–0	FR Allan (10)
140.	CO Donzère (12)	1–3	FC Eyrieux Embroye (9)
141.	US Montmeyran (12)	0–4	SC Bourguesan (12)
142.	Vivar SC Soyons (11)	7–0	US Meysse (12)
143.	Olympique St Montanais (11)	1–0	FC Viviers (12)
144.	CA Yenne (11)	0–6	Vallée du Guiers FC (8)
145.	US Vaux-en-Bugey (12)	1–8	Nivolet FC (8)
146.	US Creys-Morestel (9)	0–1	AS St André-le-Gaz (10)
147.	US Beaurepairoise (12)	1–4 (a.e.t.)	ES Drumettaz-Mouxy (9)
148.	CS Belley (10)	0–2	FC Serrières-Villebois (11)
149.	JA Heyrieux (10)	1–3	CS Verpillière (9)
150.	Formafoot Bièvre Valloire (11)	2–2 (4–2 p)	AS Colomieu (12)
151.	FCO Chandieu (11)	1–0	Artas-Charantonnay FC (11)
152.	COS Montreynaud (12)	1–0	AS Montrevelloise (9)
153.	SA St Agrève (12)	1–7	AS Portugaise Valence (10)
154.	Chambéry Sport 73 (9)	0–1	FC Haute Tarentaise (9)
155.	Olympique Villefontaine (13)	3–2	ACS Mayotte du Rhône (11)
156.	US Beauvoir-Royas (12)	0–1	AS St Lattier (12)
157.	CS Faramans (14)	0–1	Amicale Tunisienne St Martin-d'Hères (12)
158.	Concordia FC Bellegarde (10)	4–0	FC Manziat (10)
159.	FC Balmes Nord-Isère (10)	1–1 (5–3 p)	US Dolomoise (11)
160.	FC Vallon-Pont-d'Arc (11)	6–2	ES Malissardoise (12)

== Third round ==
=== French Guiana ===
These matches were played between 28 August and 11 September 2016.

Third round results: French Guiana

Tie no	Home team (tier)	Score	Away team (tier)
1.	(French Guiana) ACSO (PH)	1–8	USC Montsinery (PH) (French Guiana)
2.	(French Guiana) US Matoury (DH)	2–2 (9–8 p)	Olympique De Cayenne (DH) (French Guiana)
3.	(French Guiana) SC Kouroucien (DH)	13–0	US St-Elie (PH) (French Guiana)
4.	(French Guiana) USL Montjoly (PH)	3–4	AJ Saint-Georges (PH) (French Guiana)
5.	(French Guiana) EJ Balate (PH)	3–3 (4–5 p)	Kourou FC (DH) (French Guiana)
6.	(French Guiana) CSC Cayenne (DH)	3–0 (Note: Game won by forfeit)	RC Maroni (PH) (French Guiana)
7.	(French Guiana) Le Geldar De Kourou (DH)	4–0	ASL Sport Guyanais (PH) (French Guiana)
8.	(French Guiana) FC Oyapock (PH)	2–1	US Sinnamary (PH) (French Guiana)
9.	(French Guiana) AJ Balata Abriba (PH)	8–1	FC Renaissance (PH) (French Guiana)
10.	(French Guiana) Dynamo De Soula (PH)	2–2 (1–4 p)	ASU Grand Santi (DH) (French Guiana)
11.	(French Guiana) AOJ Mana (PH)	1–2	ASC Agouado (DH) (French Guiana)
12.	(French Guiana) ASC Karib (PH)	1–3	EF Iracoubo (PH) (French Guiana)
13.	(French Guiana) JSC Esperance (non)	0–3	ASC Corossony (PH) (French Guiana)
14.	(French Guiana) AJS Maroni (PH)	2–3	ASC Remire (DH) (French Guiana)
15.	(French Guiana) US Macouria (DH)	8–0	USC De Roura (PH) (French Guiana)
16.	(French Guiana) ASE Matoury (DH)	2–3	ASC Kawina (non) (French Guiana)

Note: French Guiana League Structure (no promotion to French League Structure):
Division d'Honneur (DH)
Promotion d'Honneur (PH)

=== Guadeloupe ===
These matches were played between 9 and 11 September 2016.

Third round results: Guadeloupe

Tie no	Home team (tier)	Score	Away team (tier)
1.	(Guadeloupe) La Gauloise de Basse-Terre (DH)	3–0	Solidarité-Scolaire (PHR) (Guadeloupe)
2.	(Guadeloupe) La Fregate (PH)	0–2	CS Capesterre Belle Eau (DH) (Guadeloupe)
3.	(Guadeloupe) Arsenal Club (DH)	0–3	US Ste Rose (DH) (Guadeloupe)
4.	(Guadeloupe) AO Gourbeyrienne (DH)	0–3	CS Moulien (DH) (Guadeloupe)
5.	(Guadeloupe) RC de Basse-Terre (PHR)	2–1	AMC Marie Galante (DH) (Guadeloupe)
6.	(Guadeloupe) Rapid Club (PH)	3–0	USC de Bananier (DH) (Guadeloupe)
7.	(Guadeloupe) Club Amical Marquisa (PHR)	0–3	JS Vieux-Habitants (PH) (Guadeloupe)
8.	(Guadeloupe) JSC Marie Galante (PD)	1–3	St Claude FC (PH) (Guadeloupe)
9.	(Guadeloupe) Siroco Les Abymes (DH)	3–0	ASG Juventus de Sainte-Anne (DH) (Guadeloupe)
10.	(Guadeloupe) JTR Trois Rivieres (PD)	2–2 (4–5 p)	Cactus Ste Anne (PHR) (Guadeloupe)
11.	(Guadeloupe) ASC Madiana (PH)	2–3	St. Lamentinois (PH) (Guadeloupe)
12.	(Guadeloupe) Et Morne-à-l'Eau (PHR)	2–1	AS Le Gosier (DH) (Guadeloupe)
13.	(Guadeloupe) Et de l'Ouest (PHR)	3–4	USBM (DH) (Guadeloupe)
14.	(Guadeloupe) ANJE (PHR)	2–1	JS Abymienne (PHR) (Guadeloupe)
15.	(Guadeloupe) Unar (PHR)	4–1	Et Filante (PH) (Guadeloupe)
16.	(Guadeloupe) Phare du Canal (DH)	2–0	Red Star (DH) (Guadeloupe)

Note: Guadeloupe League Structure (no promotion to French League Structure):
Division d'Honneur (DH)
Promotion d'Honneur Régionale (PHR)
Promotion d'Honneur (PH)
Première Division (PD)

=== Martinique ===
These matches were played between 2 September and 10 September 2016.

Third round results: Martinique

Tie no	Home team (tier)	Score	Away team (tier)
1.	(Martinique) Good Luck (LR1)	1–2 (a.e.t.)	Club Franciscain (LR1) (Martinique)
2.	(Martinique) Eveil (LR3)	0–4	RC Rivière-Pilote (LR1) (Martinique)
3.	(Martinique) New Star (LR1)	2–2 (4–1 p)	CS Case-Pilote (LR1) (Martinique)
4.	(Martinique) Espoir (LR3)	0–1	AS New Club (LR1) (Martinique)
5.	(Martinique) UJ Monnérot (LR3)	2–0	L Intrépide (LR3) (Martinique)
6.	(Martinique) Assaut (LR3)	1–2	RC Lorrain (LR2) (Martinique)
7.	(Martinique) Réveil Sportif (LR3)	2–3	Eclair (LR2) (Martinique)
8.	(Martinique) Aiglon (LR1)	3–0	US Marinoise (LR2) (Martinique)
9.	(Martinique) Golden Lion FC (LR1)	3–0	Emulation (LR2) (Martinique)
10.	(Martinique) Anses Arlets FC (LR3)	1–4	US Diamantinoise (LR1) (Martinique)
11.	(Martinique) CS Vauclinois (LR2)	0–0 (4–5 p)	JS Eucalyptus (LR1) (Martinique)
12.	(Martinique) Essor-Préchotain (LR1)	0–2	AS Samaritaine (LR2) (Martinique)
13.	(Martinique) Excelsior (LR1)	2–1	US Robert (LR2) (Martinique)
14.	(Martinique) UJ Redoute (LR3)	0–2	Club Colonial (LR1) (Martinique)
15.	(Martinique) RC St Joseph (LR2)	2–1	CSC Carbet (LR3) (Martinique)
16.	(Martinique) US Riveraine (LR3)	0–2 (a.e.t.)	Golden Star (LR1) (Martinique)

Note: Martinique League Structure (no promotion to French League Structure):
Ligue Régionale 1 (LR1)
Ligue Régionale 2 (LR2)
Ligue Régionale 3 (LR3)

=== Mayotte ===
These matches played on 24 April 2016

Third round results: Mayotte

Tie no	Home team (tier)	Score	Away team (tier)
1.	(Mayotte) FC Labattoir (DHT)	1–0	FC Chiconi (PH) (Mayotte)
2.	(Mayotte) FCO Tsingoni (DHT)	0–1	FC Mtsapéré (DH) (Mayotte)
3.	(Mayotte) ASC Abeilles (DH)	1–0	VCO Vahibé (DH) (Mayotte)
4.	(Mayotte) Foudre 2000 (DH)	3–2	Enfants de Mayotte (DHT)
5.	(Mayotte) ASC Kawéni (DHT)	2–0	US Ouangani (PH) (Mayotte)
6.	(Mayotte) AS Neige (DH)	2–1	ASJ Moinatrindri (DHT) (Mayotte)
7.	(Mayotte) CS Mramadoudou (PH)	w/o	UCS Sada (DHT) (Mayotte)
8.	(Mayotte) AS Racine du Nord (DHT)	2–1	AS Rosador (DH) (Mayotte)

Note: Mayotte League Structure (no promotion to French League Structure):
Division d'Honneur (DH)
Division d'Honneur Territoriale (DHT)
Promotion d'Honneur (PH)

=== Réunion ===
These matches were played on 20 and 21 August 2016.

Third round results: Réunion

Tie no	Home team (tier)	Score	Away team (tier)
1.	(Réunion) US Bellemene Canot (D2D)	2–2 (3–4 p)	Vincendo Sport (D2D) (Réunion)
2.	(Réunion) Saint-Pauloise FC (D1R)	2–3	ASC Grands Bois (D2R) (Réunion)
3.	(Réunion) Saint-Denis FC (D1R)	1–2	Trois Bassins FC (D2R) (Réunion)
4.	(Réunion) JS Saint-Pierroise (D1R)	1–1 (5–3 p)	SS Jeanne d'Arc (D1R) (Réunion)
5.	(Réunion) AS St Philippe (D2R)	0–5	AS Excelsior (D1R) (Réunion)
6.	(Réunion) JS Bras Creux (D2D)	0–1	AS Capricorne (D1R) (Réunion)
7.	(Réunion) AS Grand Fond (D2R)	0–2	AF Saint-Louisien (D2R) (Réunion)
8.	(Réunion) AS Saint-Suzanne (D1R)	1–0	La Tamponnaise (D2D) (Réunion)

Note: Reúnion League Structure (no promotion to French League Structure):
Division 1 Régionale (D1R)
Division 2 Régionale (D2R)
Division 2 Départementale (D2D)
Division 3 Départementale (D3D)

=== Bourgogne ===
These matches were played on 10 and 11 September 2016.

Third round results: Bourgogne

Tie no	Home team (tier)	Score	Away team (tier)
1.	FREP Luthenay (10)	0–8	FC Gueugnon (5)
2.	AS Quetigny (6)	2–1 (a.e.t.)	FC Chalon (6)
3.	Chalon ACF (8)	0–8	CS Louhans-Cuiseaux (5)
4.	CSP Charmoy (9)	2–3 (a.e.t.)	SC Selongey (5)
5.	SC Gron (9)	0–6	ALC Longvic (7)
6.	CA St Georges (10)	0–2	Réveil Is-sur-Tille (7)
7.	FC Chevannes (10)	2–0	AS Véron (10)
8.	US Joigny (8)	0–3	Stade Auxerrois (6)
9.	ASUC Migennes (8)	0–6	AS Clamecy (7)
10.	US Varennes (8)	0–1	AS Chablis (9)
11.	US La Charité (7)	0–1	Paron FC (6)
12.	US Cheminots Dijonnais (7)	3–1	Chevigny Saint Sauveur (7)
13.	CO Avallonnais (6)	2–1 (a.e.t.)	ASC Saint-Apollinaire (6)
14.	JS Rully (9)	2–5	FC Sens (6)
15.	SC Vitteaux (11)	1–4	ASC Plombières-Lès-Dijon (8)
16.	AS Châtenoy-le-Royal (8)	2–1	CS Corbigeois (9)
17.	CSL Chenôve (10)	1–6	AS Genlis (8)
18.	ASFC Daix (9)	1–2	FC Chassagne-Montrachet (9)
19.	AS Magny (9)	2–1	CS Auxonnais (7)
20.	SC Mâcon (10)	2–0	ASA Vauzelles (8)
21.	US Cheminots Paray (7)	2–1 (a.e.t.)	AS Chapelloise (7)
22.	US St Bonnet/La Guiche (8)	0–1	SR Clayettois (9)
23.	St Vallier Sport (11)	1–9	UF Mâconnais (6)
24.	US St Sernin-du-Bois (6)	2–1	Sud Nivernais Imphy Decize (6)
25.	Digoin FCA (8)	6–2	AS Garchizy (7)
26.	AS Sornay (8)	0–1	ESA Breuil (8)
27.	CS Mervans (9)	1–2	US Meursault (7)
28.	FC Abergement-de-Cuisery (8)	0–4	FR Saint Marcel (7)
29.	AFC Cuiseaux-Champagnat (11)	0–2 (a.e.t.)	JS Crechoise (7)
30.	AS Tournus (11)	0–4	AS Beaune (7)
31.	US St Martin-Senozan (11)	0–2	US Sennecey-le-Grand et Son Canton (9)

=== Auvergne ===
These matches were played on 10 and 11 September 2016.

Third round results: Auvergne

Tie no	Home team (tier)	Score	Away team (tier)
1.	AS Loudes (9)	1–7	Velay FC (6)
2.	US Blavozy (7)	0–3	FC Espaly (6)
3.	Sauveteurs Brivois (11)	3–1 (a.e.t.)	AS Chadrac (7)
4.	Ass. Vergongheon-Arvant (7)	2–0	Olympic St Julien-Chapteuil (8)
5.	FC Riom (7)	1–0	FC Chamalières (5)
6.	AS Louchy (9)	1–0	SC Gannat (6)
7.	CS Arpajonnais (7)	1–5	FC Aurillac Arpajon CA (5)
8.	FC Bézenet (9)	0–2	AS Domerat (6)
9.	US St Flour (7)	4–1	US Vallée de l'Authre (7)
10.	FF Chappes (10)	1–7	US St Georges / Les Ancizes (6)
11.	Bourbon Sportif (9)	3–2	US Biachette Désertines (9)
12.	CS Vaux-Estivareilles (11)	0–3	AS Cheminots St Germain (10)
13.	AS Dompierroise (8)	1–2	Montluçon Football (6)
14.	Médiéval Club Montluçonnais (11)	0–2	SC St Pourcain (10)
15.	AS Trévoloise (9)	0–5	US Doyet (9)
16.	Bellerive-Brugheas Foot (10)	2–3	CS Bessay (9)
17.	AS Tronget (9)	0–2	SCA Cussét (8)
18.	AS Châtel-de-Neuvre (11)	2–6	AA Lapalisse (7)
19.	Aulnat Sportif (9)	0–2	RC Vichy (6)
20.	FC Billy-Crechy (8)	1–2	AS Moulins (7)
21.	Sud Cantal Foot (8)	1–2	Ytrac Foot (6)
22.	FC Coltines (11)	2–0	AS Sansacoise (8)
23.	FC Massiac-Molompize-Blesle (8)	1–2	Entente Nord Lozere (6)
24.	ES St Mamet (9)	0–2	Sporting Chataigneraie Cantal (7)
25.	FC Aurec (9)	1–4	FC Dunières (10)
26.	AS Emblavez-Vorey (8)	4–3	AS St Didier-St Just (9)
27.	US Les Martres-de-Veyre (8)	1–4	CS Volvic (6)
28.	AS Moissat (10)	0–4	AS Romagnat (11)
29.	US Mozac (9)	1–0	US Lapeyrouse (10)
30.	FA Le Cendre (8)	1–0	FC Châtel-Guyon (8)
31.	ALS Besse Egliseneuve (9)	0–1	Lempdes Sport (6)
32.	EFC St Amant-Tallende (8)	1–4	SA Thiers (6)
33.	AS Livradois Sud (9)	4–2	ES St Germinoise (10)
34.	Pérignat FC (7)	2–3	FCUS Ambert (7)
35.	CSA Brassacois Florinois (9)	2–1	US Val de Couze Chambon (10)
36.	Dômes-Sancy Foot (9)	0–2	FC Cournon (5)
37.	US Vic-le-Comte (8)	2–0	US Issoire (11)
38.	US La Chapelle-Laurent (11)	4–1	FC Artense (8)

=== Lower Normandy ===
These matches were played on 10 and 11 September 2016.

Third round results: Lower Normandy

Tie no	Home team (tier)	Score	Away team (tier)
1.	FC Équeurdreville-Hainneville (8)	3–3 (5–3 p)	Bayeux FC (6)
2.	Agneaux FC (7)	5–2	AS Tourlaville (6)
3.	Avenir Messei (9)	0–5	FC Flers (6)
4.	AS Potigny-Villers-Canivet-Ussy (8)	1–0	Bourguébus-Soliers FC (8)
5.	Jeunesse Fertoise Bagnoles (8)	0–2	AF Virois (6)
6.	AG Caennaise (7)	0–5	SU Dives-Cabourg (5)
7.	USM Donville (9)	0–10	ASPTT Caen (6)
8.	AS Cherbourg (7)	1–0	UC Bricquebec (8)
9.	SS St Georges-Domfront (8)	1–1 (6–7 p)	AS Jullouville-Sartilly (10)
10.	US Maisons (10)	2–6	US Ouest Cotentin (8)
11.	FC Val de Saire (10)	1–5	ES Coutances (6)
12.	Réveil St Germain Courselles-sur-Mer (7)	2–6	FC Saint-Lô Manche (6)
13.	Lystrienne Sportive (9)	3–5	FC Agon-Coutainville (8)
14.	AS St Vigor-le-Grand (8)	0–2	USI Bessin Nord (9)
15.	CS Carentan (8)	3–1	CA Pontois (9)
16.	AS Brécey (7)	3–1	Espérance St Jean-des-Champs (8)
17.	US Villers-Bocage (8)	1–4	Maladrerie OS (6)
18.	US Flerienne (11)	2–1	AS Cahagnes (9)
19.	Patriote St Jamaise (9)	0–2	LC Bretteville-sur-Odon (7)
20.	La Bréhalaise FC (8)	3–3 (1–3 p)	SL Pétruvien (9)
21.	US St Quentin-sur-le-Homme (8)	1–4	JS Douvres (7)
22.	FC Argences (10)	2–1	CA Lisieux (8)
23.	JS Colleville (10)	0–2	AS Trouville-Deauville (6)
24.	AS St Cyr-Fervaques (9)	1–1 (9–8 p)	AS Courteille Alençon (9)
25.	Avenir St Germain-du-Corbéis (9)	0–6	USON Mondeville (6)
26.	US Randonnai (11)	2–6	US Alençon (6)
27.	CS Honfleur (7)	2–1	US Pont-l'Évêque (8)
28.	Inter Odon FC (8)	1–0	US Houlgate (9)
29.	SC Hérouvillais (6)	2–2 (7–6 p)	FC Argentan (7)

=== Centre-Val de Loire ===
These matches were played on 10 and 11 September 2016.

Third round results: Centre-Val de Loire

Tie no	Home team (tier)	Score	Away team (tier)
1.	USM Saran (6)	5–2 (a.e.t.)	USM Montargis (6)
2.	AJS Mont Bracieux (8)	0–5	Avoine OCC (5)
3.	Avenir Lignières (10)	0–2	Blois Foot 41 (5)
4.	CS Vignoux-sur-Barangeon (9)	1–6	Bourges Foot (6)
5.	FC Déolois (7)	0–3	Bourges 18 (5)
6.	Vineuil SF (6)	1–2	Saint-Pryvé Saint-Hilaire FC (5)
7.	FC St Doulchard (8)	3–4	AS St Amandoise (6)
8.	US Chitenay-Cellettes (8)	2–3	FC St Jean-le-Blanc (7)
9.	CA Pithiviers (7)	2–0	FCO Saint-Jean-de-la-Ruelle (10)
10.	US Dampierre-en-Burly (10)	0–9	Chartres Horizon (6)
11.	CAN Portugais Chartres (9)	1–4	J3S Amilly (7)
12.	CS Angerville-Pussay (10)	1–2	US Vendôme (8)
13.	FCM Ingré (8)	1–3	FC Drouais (5)
14.	Etoile Brou (9)	0–1	SMOC St Jean-de-Braye (7)
15.	ASJ La Chaussée-St-Victor (9)	2–2 (8–9 p)	FC St Georges-sur-Eure (7)
16.	AS Chouzy-Onzain (8)	2–1	Amicale de Lucé (7)
17.	US Châteauneuf-sur-Loire (6)	4–1	CSM Sully-sur-Loire (7)
18.	US Aigurande (10)	0–2	FC Ouest Tournageau (6)
19.	AS Portugais Bourges (7)	5–2	USM Olivet (7)
20.	AS Montlouis-sur-Loire (7)	2–1	US Chambray-lès-Tours (7)
21.	Olympique Portugais Mehun-sur-Yèvre (10)	0–3	Étoile Bleue St Cyr-sur-Loire (6)
22.	ES Oésienne (8)	3–1	St Georges Descartes (8)
23.	SC Azay-Cheillé (7)	1–1 (2–4 p)	Vierzon FC (6)
24.	Espérance Hippolytaine (11)	1–0	US Montgivray (9)
25.	ES La Ville-aux-Dames (8)	0–0 (2–4 p)	AS Monts (8)
26.	JAS Moulins-sur-Céphons (11)	0–6	AS Contres (8)
27.	ES Trouy (9)	2–3	SA Issoudun (7)
28.	CS Lusitanos Beaugency (8)	0–1	Amicale Épernon (8)

=== Centre-West ===
These matches were played on 10 and 11 September 2016.

Third round results: Centre-West

Tie no	Home team (tier)	Score	Away team (tier)
1.	FREP St Germain (11)	0–5	JA Isle (6)
2.	SL Antran (9)	0–3	Thouars Foot 79 (6)
3.	AS Gouzon (7)	1–0	US Donzenac (8)
4.	US Courlay (10)	2–0	ES Brion-St Secondin (11)
5.	ACG Foot Sud 86 (11)	0–5	OL St Liguaire Niort (6)
6.	La Ligugéenne Football (7)	2–3	AS Réthaise (7)
7.	US Migné-Auxances (9)	1–2	US Bessines/Morterolles (7)
8.	CS Naintré (8)	1–5	FC Bressuire (5)
9.	CA St Savin-St Germain (8)	1–0	FC Chauray (6)
10.	AS Brie (10)	2–6	ES La Rochelle (6)
11.	SC Mouthiers (9)	2–3	SC St Jean-d'Angély (6)
12.	Nersac FC (10)	1–2	FC Sévigné Jonzac-St Germain (11)
13.	FC Roullet-St Estèphe (11)	1–1 (3–4 p)	UA Niort St Florent (8)
14.	Stade Ruffec (9)	4–1	ES Nouaillé (7)
15.	AS St Yrieix (8)	2–4	AS Cozes (5)
16.	AS Montguyon (10)	1–1 (4–2 p)	AS Soyaux (7)
17.	Tulle Football Corèze (6)	0–1	AS Aixois (7)
18.	ES Marchoise (8)	1–4	US Chauvigny (6)
19.	ES Ardin (10)	0–4	Royan Vaux AFC (7)
20.	CO Cerizay (8)	1–5	CA Neuville (7)
21.	US Mélusine (10)	2–0	Buslaurs Thireuil (11)
22.	AS Valdivienne (12)	0–3	SEPC Exireuil (12)
23.	Avenir Bellac-Berneuil-St Junien-les-Combes (9)	4–3 (a.e.t.)	ES St Benoit (10)
24.	FC Charente Limousine (9)	1–0	ES Buxerolles (7)
25.	Jarnac SF (8)	1–4	ES Saintes (7)
26.	EFC DB2S (10)	1–5	UA Cognac (6)
27.	Avenir Matha (9)	0–1	AS Puymoyen (9)
28.	JS Semussac (10)	7–1	JS Basseau Angoulême (11)
29.	Olympique Larche Lafeuillade (9)	0–5	Limoges FC (5)
30.	Amicale St Hilaire-Venarsal (10)	0–3	CS Feytiat (6)
31.	AS St Pantaleon (7)	2–1	Amicale Franco-Portugais Limoges (8)
32.	SS Ste Féréole (9)	1–0	ES Guérétoise (7)
33.	USC Bourganeuf (10)	1–4	ES Aiglons Briviste (7)
34.	ES St Sulpice-le-Guérétois (9)	3–0	FRJEP Cornil (10)
35.	FC Pays Argentonnais (10)	3–0	FC Rouillé (11)
36.	AS Coulonges-Thouarsais (12)	0–3	ES Beaumont-St Cyr (8)
37.	EF Le Tallud (9)	1–2	UES Montmorillon (6)
38.	US Mauzé-sur-le-Mignon (11)	3–1	St Palais SF (8)
39.	AS Portugais Niort (8)	0–9	Poitiers FC (6)
40.	US St Varent Pierregeay (11)	0–9	SO Châtellerault (6)
41.	Stade Vouillé (11)	3–2 (a.e.t.)	US Aulnay (10)
42.	Espérance Availles-en-Châtellerault (11)	0–4	AS Échiré St Gelais (6)
43.	FC Fleuré (10)	1–6	Angoulême CFC (5)
44.	FC Fontaine-le-Comte (9)	4–0	US Nantiat (10)
45.	AAS St Julien-l'Ars (10)	0–5	SA Moncoutant (9)
46.	US Usson-du-Poitou (12)	3–0	US Champdeniers-Pamplie (11)
47.	AS Nexon (10)	5–2	ES Ussel (10)
48.	AS Panazol (10)	2–1	Varetz AC (8)

=== Corsica ===
The Preliminary rounds in Corsica started with the third round due to the relatively low number of teams competing.

These matches were played on 11 September 2016.

Third round results: Corsica

Tie no	Home team (tier)	Score	Away team (tier)
1.	AS Squadra Verde (9)	2–4	JS Bonifacio (7)
2.	FC U Niolu (9)	0–4	CA Propriano (6)
3.	Gallia Club Lucciana (6)	3–1	Sud FC (6)
4.	JO Sartenaise (8)	0–1	AS Casinca (6)
5.	AS Nebbiu Conca d'Oru (6)	0–1	USC Corte (6)
6.	AS Luri (9)	3–0 (Note: EC Bastiais penalised. AS Luri progress to fourth round)	EC Bastiais (8)
7.	Afa FA (7)	2–5	FB Île-Rousse (5)
8.	ÉF Bastia (6)	2–1	FC Costa Verde (7)
9.	AS Venacaise (9)	0–10	FC Bastelicaccia (6)
10.	SC Bocognano Gravona (6)	4–0	US Ghisonaccia (6)
11.	FC Ajaccio (7)	0–4	Borgo FC (5)
12.	AJ Biguglia (6)	0–3	AS Furiani-Agliani (5)
13.	AS Santa Reparata (8)	3–2	AS Antisanti (9)

=== Franche-Comté ===
All but one of these matches were played on 10 and 11 September 2016.

Third round results: Franche-Comté

Tie no	Home team (tier)	Score	Away team (tier)
1.	Bresse Jura Foot (6)	0–2	CA Pontarlier (5)
2.	AS Baume-les-Dames (6)	3–1 (a.e.t.)	US Sochaux (7)
3.	ES Doubs (10)	1–3	FC Montfaucon-Morre-Gennes-La Vèze (7)
4.	FC Champagnole (6)	3–0 (a.e.t.)	FC 4 Rivières 70 (7)
5.	FC Grandvillars (6)	1–0	US Pont-de-Roide (6)
6.	US Les Écorces (8)	2–1 (a.e.t.)	PS Besançon (6)
7.	FC Plaine 39 (10)	0–2	Jura Lacs Foot (7)
8.	AS Foucherans (8)	3–7	AS Levier (6)
9.	FC Noidanais (7)	5–1	US Larians-et-Munans (8)
10.	US St Vit (6)	2–1	Racing Besançon (5)
11.	AS Château de Joux (8)	2–1	SC Clémenceau Besançon (6)
12.	Drugeon Sports (11)	1–5	ES Entre Roches (8)
13.	FC Damparis (8)	1–3 (a.e.t.)	Jura Dolois Foot (6)
14.	AS Bavilliers (8)	0–4	AS Ornans (5)
15.	CS Portusien (9)	0–3	Entente Roche-Novillars (6)
16.	AS Mélisey-St Barthélemy (8)	0–6	Besançon FC (5)
17.	Olympique Montbéliard (9)	2–1	ES Pays Maîchois (8)
18.	SG Héricourt (8)	2–4 (a.e.t.)	AS Luxeuil (8)
19.	FC Valdahon-Vercel (7)	5–1	JS Lure (8)
20.	FC Bart (7)	1–6	FC L'Isle-sur-le-Doubs (7)
21.	AS Danjoutin-Andelnans-Méroux (9)	0–1	AS Audincourt (8)

=== Languedoc-Roussillon ===
These matches were played on 10 and 11 September 2016.

Third round results: Languedoc-Roussillon

Tie no	Home team (tier)	Score	Away team (tier)
1.	AS Lattoise (6)	2–0	ES Pays d'Uzes (7)
2.	CO Castelnaudary (7)	0–3	Olympique Alès (5)
3.	US Monoblet (8)	2–2 (4–5 p)	RCO Agde (5)
4.	US Béziers (8)	5–1	AS Caissargues (9)
5.	AS Poulx (9)	2–5	US Conques (7)
6.	FC Briolet (7)	3–1	Perpignan FC Bas-Vernet (7)
7.	ESC Le Buisson (9)	1–5	La Clermontaise Football (7)
8.	Haut-Minervois Olympique (8)	0–4	US Salinières Aigues Mortes (6)
9.	Marvejols Sports (7)	2–0	GC Lunel (7)
10.	AS Montarnaud-St Paul-Vaihauques-Murviel (8)	0–3	FC Bagnols Pont (6)
11.	FO Sud Hérault (10)	1–4	AS Puissalicon-Magalas (9)
12.	Pointe Courte AC Sète (9)	4–0	FC Pradéen (10)
13.	AS St Georges-de-Lévéjac (10)	0–5	GC Uchaud (7)
14.	USA Pezens (8)	2–5	Olympique Alenya (8)
15.	AS Gignacaise (7)	4–1	SO Aimargues (7)
16.	US Villeveyracoise (10)	1–5	AS St Paulet (9)
17.	Castelnau Le Crès FC (6)	3–1 (a.e.t.)	AS Atlas Paillade (7)
18.	AEC St Gilles (7)	6–5	Ille-sur-Têt FC (8)
19.	US Montagnacoise (9)	0–4	AS Frontignan AC (6)
20.	AS St Privat-des-Vieux (8)	3–2	OC Perpignan (6)
21.	UFC Aimargues (10)	2–3	Entente St Clément-Montferrier (6)
22.	FA Carcassonne (6)	3–0	FC St Estève (7)
23.	AC Alignanais (9)	1–2 (a.e.t.)	Trèbes FC (7)
24.	AS Nîmes Athletic (8)	0–5	AS Fabrègues (5)
25.	FU Narbonne (6)	2–0	FC Alberes Argelès (6)
26.	RC Vedasien (9)	1–1 (5–3 p)	Olympique Moussan-Montredon (8)
27.	FC Villedubert (9)	0–7	CE Palavas (6)
28.	JS Chemin Bas d'Avignon (7)	0–1	Stade Beaucairois (7)
29.	ES Ste Eulalie-Villesèquelande (8)	0–1	AS Badaroux (9)
30.	RC St Georges-d'Orques (9)	0–3	FC Chusclan-Laudun-l'Ardoise (8)
31.	Olympique La Peyrade FC (8)	0–4	Canet Roussillon FC (6)
32.	ES Suménoise (10)	1–5	AS Perpignan Méditerranée (7)
33.	SC Anduzien (7)	4–0	US Bompas (8)
34.	US Villeneuvoise (10)	1–2	US Minervois (8)
35.	AS Rousson (7)	2–3	AF Lozère (5)
36.	Entente Corneilhan-Lignan (10)	1–2 (a.e.t.)	FC Val de Cèze (7)

=== Maine ===
These matches were played on 10 and 11 September 2016.

Third round results: Maine

Tie no	Home team (tier)	Score	Away team (tier)
1.	SA Mamertins (6)	2–1	ES Connerré (6)
2.	US Cigné (10)	2–5	Ernéenne Foot (8)
3.	AS Oisseau (11)	0–3	ES Bonchamp (6)
4.	AS Contest-St Baudelle (10)	0–2	AS Bourny Laval (6)
5.	US Laval (8)	3–1	US St Berthevin (7)
6.	AS Martigné-sur-Mayenne (11)	1–2	Louverné Sports (7)
7.	Stade Mayennais FC (6)	3–4	US Changé (5)
8.	US La Chapelle-St-Rémy (10)	1–1 (7–8 p)	AS Le Mans Villaret (7)
9.	US Bouloire (10)	0–6	Le Mans FC (5)
10.	Beaumont SA (9)	4–0	US St Mars-la-Brière (8)
11.	VS Fertois (6)	3–0	US Arnage Pontlieue (7)
12.	US Nautique Spay (8)	2–0	FC Pays de Sillé (9)
13.	JA Soulgé-sur-Ouette (10)	0–6	Sablé FC (5)
14.	US Méral-Cossé (8)	0–2	Ancienne Château-Gontier (6)
15.	ES Craon (8)	1–8	La Suze FC (6)
16.	FC Château-Gontier (9)	3–4	CO St Saturnin Arche (6)
17.	US Entrammes (9)	0–3	Patriote Brulonnaise (7)
18.	FA Laval Bonne Lorraine (10)	0–4	JS Coulaines (6)
19.	US Mansigné (10)	1–3	US Bazouges-Cré (7)
20.	EG Rouillon (9)	3–1	CA Evronnais (8)
21.	US Guécélard (6)	1–3	ES Moncé (7)
22.	SS Noyen-sur-Sarthe (8)	2–0	CO Castélorien (9)
23.	AS Mulsanne-Teloché (6)	6–0	Écommoy FC (6)
24.	AS Ruaudin (10)	0–6	RC Fléchois (5)

=== Midi-Pyrénées ===
These matches were played on 10 and 11 September 2016.

Third round results: Midi-Pyrénées

Tie no	Home team (tier)	Score	Away team (tier)
1.	Élan Marivalois (9)	3–2 (a.e.t.)	Avenir Lavitois (10)
2.	Eauze FC (10)	0–10	Balma SC (5)
3.	US Seysses-Frouzins (8)	4–0	AS Argelès-Lavedan (9)
4.	Toulouse Métropole FC (6)	9–0	Séméac OFC (7)
5.	US Revel (6)	3–5 (a.e.t.)	Olympique Girou FC (6)
6.	Montauban FCTG (7)	3–3 (4–5 p)	FC Pays Mazamétain (8)
7.	Baziège OC (8)	0–1	Stade Villefranchois (8)
8.	JS Carbonne (9)	1–4	US Cazères (7)
9.	FC Pavien (9)	2–2 (5–3 p)	FC Foix (7)
10.	Juillan OS (8)	5–1	JS Toulouse Pradettes (8)
11.	AA Grisolles (7)	1–2	AS Fleurance-La Sauvetat (7)
12.	FC L'Isle-Jourdain (9)	0–3	AS Muretaine (6)
13.	ES St Jean-du-Falga (8)	0–5	Étoile Aussonnaise (7)
14.	AS Bressols (9)	2–1	JS Cugnaux (8)
15.	JE Toulousaine Croix-Daurade (12)	3–0	Un Jeune Avenir (12)
16.	FC St Girons (10)	1–0	Juventus de Papus (7)
17.	US Pibrac (7)	2–0	FC Pamiers (8)
18.	Cahors FC (8)	0–3	Toulouse Rodéo FC (5)
19.	FC Biars-Bretenoux (9)	1–1 (2–4 p)	US St Sulpice (9)
20.	US Castres (8)	0–1	Figeac Quercy (9)
21.	Ségala-Rieupeyroux-Salvetat (9)	2–3	SC Sébazac (9)
22.	FC Naucellois (9)	1–3	FC Marssac-Rivières-Senouillac Rives du Tarn (7)
23.	JS Bassin Aveyron (9)	2–3 (a.e.t.)	St Orens FC (8)
24.	Lauragais FC (9)	0–1	Onet-le-Château (6)
25.	FC Val d'Assou (11)	2–2 (3–0 p)	ASC Mahorais (12)
26.	Vallée du Lot Capdenac (9)	0–4	Luc Primaube FC (6)
27.	Entente St Georges/St Rome (9)	2–1 (a.e.t.)	US Carmaux (8)
28.	SO Millau (9)	3–1	Foot Vallon (9)
29.	FC Mabroc (10)	0–10	Luzenac AP (6)
30.	ASC Barbazan-Debat (10)	2–4	FC Lourdais XI (7)
31.	Elan Pyrénéen Bazet-Bordères-Lagarde (9)	1–2	ERCSO L'Isle-en-Dodon (8)
32.	EFC Aurignac (9)	0–4	Auch Football (6)
33.	US Aignanaise (10)	0–1	AS Portet-Carrefour-Récébédou (7)
34.	SC Lafrancaisain (9)	2–0	Avenir Fonsorbais (7)
35.	ES St Simon (8)	0–4	Blagnac FC (6)
36.	Bruguières SC (11)	0–4	Saint-Alban Aucamville FC (6)
37.	Inter FC (10)	1–3	US Castanéenne (5)
38.	US Gaillacois (9)	0–4	Montauban AF (8)
39.	FC Labastide-de-Lévis (10)	1–1 (4–5 p)	FC Graulhet (9)
40.	AS Causse Limargue (10)	0–4	Beaupuy-Montrabé-St Jean FC (7)
41.	AS Montcabrier (10)	3–10	Entente Golfech-St Paul-d'Espis (6)
42.	AS Vallée du Sor (10)	3–1	St Juéry OF (8)
43.	Toulouse ACF (8)	3–1	Stade St Affricain (8)
44.	Druelle FC (8)	2–0	Pradines-St Vincent-Douelle-Mercuès Olt (6)
45.	US Albi (6)	2–1	AS L'Union (7)

=== Aquitaine ===
These matches were played on 10 and 11 September 2016.

Third round results: Aquitaine

Tie no	Home team (tier)	Score	Away team (tier)
1.	Élan Béarnaise Orthez (6)	0–2	Aviron Bayonnaise FC (5)
2.	Colayrac FC (8)	2–2 (3–4 p)	FC Marmande 47 (5)
3.	FC Terrasson (10)	0–5	US Lormont (6)
4.	FA Morlaàs est Béarn (7)	0–1	Genêts Anglet (5)
5.	FC Sarlat-Marcillac (7)	0–2	SU Agen (7)
6.	Andernos Sport FC (9)	1–2	US Mussidan-St Medard (9)
7.	Vaillante Sportive Caudrot (9)	0–5	Biscarrosse OFC (7)
8.	CO Coulouniex-Chamiers (8)	1–4	Langon FC (6)
9.	Limens FC (9)	3–1	Targon-Soulignac FC (9)
10.	Joyeuse St Sulpice-et-Cameyrac (10)	1–4	SA Mérignac (6)
11.	ES Montignacoise (10)	0–2	AS Antonne-Le Change (8)
12.	FC Pays Beaumontois (11)	1–4	FC Cendrieux-La Douze (11)
13.	Patronage Bazadais (10)	0–1	Hasparren FC (9)
14.	ES Montoise (9)	3–0	US Illadaise (10)
15.	SA Mauléonais (9)	2–0	RC Bordeaux Métropole (8)
16.	Hiriburuko Ainhara (8)	6–1	AS Pontonx (9)
17.	Bleuets Pau (8)	0–4	Jeunesse Villenave (6)
18.	US St Michel Arudy (10)	0–2	ES Blanquefort (7)
19.	FC Bassin d'Arcachon (6)	6–0	Avenir Mourenxois (7)
20.	Bouliacaise FC (12)	0–10	Stade Bordelais ASPTT (5)
21.	FC des Graves (7)	3–1 (a.e.t.)	ES Boulazac (7)
22.	CA Carbon Blanais (10)	0–0 (2–4 p)	AS Gensac-Montcaret (9)
23.	AF Casseneuil-Pailloles-Lédat (10)	0–1	FC Libourne (6)
24.	AGJA Caudéran (9)	1–4 (a.e.t.)	US Alliance Talençaise (8)
25.	AS Pays de Montaigne et Gurçon (10)	2–1	CA St Hélène (8)
26.	US Port Ste Marie-Feugarolles (10)	1–2	US La Catte (8)
27.	Coqs Rouges Bordeaux (7)	1–2	FC St André-de-Cubzac (8)
28.	Entente Boé Bon-Encontre (9)	0–4	La Brède FC (7)
29.	Elan Boucalais (7)	1–2	US Lège Cap Ferret (5)
30.	CS Portugais Villenave-d'Ornon (9)	0–4	FCE Mérignac Arlac (6)
31.	AS Bretagne-de-Marsan (11)	3–1	FC Izon-Vayres (8)
32.	FC Lescar (8)	4–1	Croisés St André Bayonne (7)
33.	SC Monségur (11)	1–3	FC Estuaire Haute Gironde (6)
34.	Seignosse-Capbreton-Soutsons FC (9)	0–0 (4–1 p)	ES Eysinaise (8)
35.	FC Coteaux Libournais (9)	0–1	US St Denis-de-Pile (10)
36.	FC des Enclaves et du Plateau (11)	0–3	FC Doazit (9)
37.	SC Aresien (11)	1–3	AS Taillan (9)
38.	AS Le Haillan (11)	1–5	JA Biarritz (6)
39.	SC Bastidienne (10)	0–4	ES Audenge (8)
40.	AS Artix (9)	1–1 (3–5 p)	FC Tartas-St Yaguen (6)
41.	USJ St Augustin Club Pyrénées Aquitaine (10)	1–2	ES Meillon-Assat-Narcastet (8)
42.	AS Facture-Biganos Boïens (9)	1–0 (a.e.t.)	St Paul Sport (7)
43.	Pardies Olympique (8)	1–3	SAG Cestas (6)

=== Atlantique ===
These matches were played on 10 and 11 September 2016.

Third round results: Atlantique

Tie no	Home team (tier)	Score	Away team (tier)
1.	US Autize Vendée (11)	0–9	Poiré-sur-Vie VF (6)
2.	EF Cheffois-St Maurice (9)	1–2	St Aubin-Guérande Football (7)
3.	ES Dresny-Plessé (10)	3–1	Luçon FC (7)
4.	St Pierre de Retz (8)	3–1	Pornic Foot (9)
5.	Vigilante St Fulgent (9)	4–2 (a.e.t.)	JA St Mars-du-Désert (9)
6.	FC Mouilleron-Thouarsais-Caillère (8)	1–2	ES Maritime (9)
7.	ES Pineaux (10)	5–4	US Maze (10)
8.	AC Basse-Goulaine (8)	0–3	USSA Vertou (5)
9.	Pays de Chantonnay Foot (10)	0–3	TVEC Les Sables-d'Olonne (6)
10.	FC Chavagnes-La Rabatelière (11)	0–4	FC Fief Gesté (11)
11.	AS St Mesmin (12)	1–6	EA La Tessoualle (9)
12.	Abbaretz-Saffré FC (11)	0–6	ES Côte de Lumière (8)
13.	ES Marais (10)	3–5	AS La Châtaigneraie (7)
14.	FC Val de Moine (11)	1–8	ES Segré (6)
15.	AC Belle-Bielle (12)	3–2	FC Achards (8)
16.	AS Longeron-Torfou (11)	2–0	Marsouins Brétigonllais Foot (8)
17.	SA St Florent-des-Bois (11)	3–1	ASC St Barthélémy-d'Anjou (11)
18.	Hermitage Venansault (12)	2–2 (5–6 p)	FC Essartais (7)
19.	La Saint André (9)	1–4	ASR Machecoul (9)
20.	LSG Les Brouzils (9)	1–0	NDC Angers (8)
21.	US Thouaré (8)	0–3	ASI Mûrs-Erigné (8)
22.	FC Chabossière (10)	2–4	FE Trélazé (7)
23.	US Varades (10)	2–1	ESOF La Roche-sur-Yon (7)
24.	US Pellerinaise (13)	0–7	FC Castel-Fiacrais (10)
25.	La Malouine Football (9)	1–1 (5–3 p)	AS St Pierre-Montrevault (8)
26.	FC Retz (10)	0–2	Élan de Gorges Foot (8)
27.	Christophe-Séguinière (10)	2–3 (a.e.t.)	Mareuil SC (8)
28.	US Toutlemonde Maulévrier (11)	4–1 (a.e.t.)	Nort ACF (9)
29.	Landreau-Loroux OSC (11)	1–5	Orvault SF (6)
30.	ES Pornichet (9)	1–2	La Roche VF (5)
31.	ES Montilliers (11)	1–0	US Beaufort-en-Valée (8)
32.	St Joachim Brière Sports (11)	0–1	FC Beaupréau (8)
33.	FC Fuilet-Chaussaire (10)	1–2	La France d'Aizenay (8)
34.	FC Laurentais Landemontais (9)	2–1	USA Pouancé (8)
35.	Etoile de Clisson (9)	3–0	ES Belligné-Chapelle-Maumusson (9)
36.	FC Cécilien Martinoyen (10)	0–1	Châtelais FC (11)
37.	FC Ingrandes-Le Fresne (11)	0–3	AS Vieillevigne-La Planche (8)
38.	AC Pouzauges-Réaumur (7)	1–0	FC Montaigu (6)
39.	LS Ste Flaive des Loups (11)	1–3	GS St Sébastien (7)
40.	SC Avessac-Fégréac (12)	0–5	AS Sud Loire (9)
41.	SC Beaucouzé (6)	1–0	JSC Bellevue Nantes (7)
42.	US Bournezeau-St Hilaire (10)	1–1 (4–5 p)	FC Sud Sèvre et Maine (10)
43.	St Venant SF (9)	0–2	ES Bouchemaine (7)
44.	ES Blain (9)	1–3	St Nazaire AF (6)
45.	FC Guémené-Massérac (12)	4–2	FC St Julien-Vairé (10)
46.	Football Chalonnes-Chaudefonds (10)	1–4	RC Ancenis 44 (7)
47.	AS Bayard-Saumur (8)	1–2	Angers Vaillante Foot (7)
48.	FF Mortagne-sur-Sèvre (11)	1–1 (4–5 p)	ASC St Médard-de-Doulon Nantes(9)
49.	US Aubigny (9)	0–4	FC Rezé (6)
50.	FC Toutes Aides Nantes (12)	1–5	St Marc Football (11)
51.	FC Loulaysien (10)	1–2	Entente Sud Vendée (11)
52.	St Vincent LUSTVI (11)	0–7	Olympique Saumur FC (6)
53.	ES Aubance (10)	2–3	St Pierre Mazières (10)
54.	US Philbertine Football (7)	2–1	Intrépide Angers Foot (8)
55.	Flochamont Sèvre Football (8)	0–5	USJA Carquefou (7)
56.	JF Cholet (11)	0–5	FC Challans (6)
57.	FC Brennois Boiséen (9)	1–2	FC Mouchamps-Rochetrejoux (9)
58.	AS Ponts-de-Cé (10)	4–2	AL Châteaubriant (8)
59.	Croix Blanche Angers (8)	0–2	Stade Olonnais (9)

=== Méditerranée ===
These matches were played on 10 and 11 September 2016.

Third round results: Méditerranée

Tie no	Home team (tier)	Score	Away team (tier)
1.	US Venelles (9)	0–3	Aubagne FC (5)
2.	ES St Zacharie (7)	1–3	RC Grasse (5)
3.	SO Cassis (10)	1–2	FC Rousset Ste Victoire (7)
4.	US 1er Canton Marseille (7)	1–0	JS Pennes Mirabeau (9)
5.	AC Arlésien (7)	11–0	Espérance Gordienne (12)
6.	Stade Maillanais (8)	4–1	AS Vallon des Tuves / FC Savinoise (9)
7.	Boxland Club Islois (8)	2–2 (4–5 p)	Gap Foot 05 (7)
8.	Avenir Club Avignonnais (11)	0–11	ARC Cavaillon (9)
9.	Espérance Sorguaise (9)	0–5	ES Fosséenne (7)
10.	Salon Bel Air (6)	4–0	SC Courthézon (7)
11.	AS Étoile du Sud (8)	1–2	SC Jonquières (9)
12.	US Autre Provence (10)	2–3	Berre SC (7)
13.	Nyons FC (8)	4–1	Olympique Rovenain (7)
14.	Espérance Pernoise (6)	1–0	FC Côte Bleue (6)
15.	Olympique Mallemortais (10)	5–0	US Veynoise SNCF (8)
16.	US Thoroise (11)	0–8	AS St Rémoise (6)
17.	ES Cannet-Rocheville (5)	2–0	FC Antibes (8)
18.	Entente St Sylvestre Nice Nord (8)	0–2	AS Estérel (8)
19.	ES Milloise (9)	1–2	US Marseille Endoume (6)
20.	US Pegomas (8)	3–0	AS Gardanne (7)
21.	Carnoux FC (7)	0–2	AS Cannes (6)
22.	Montet Bornala Club Nice (9)	0–5	US Cap d'Ail (7)
23.	FCUS Tropézienne (8)	2–1	Olympique St Maximinois (8)
24.	FC Grimaud (10)	0–2	AS Maximoise (6)
25.	US Carqueiranne-La Crau (7)	1–2	US St Mandrier (8)
26.	FSC La Ciotat (9)	2–1	ES Villeneuve-Loubet (10)
27.	Gardia Club (8)	0–2	US Mandelieu-La Napoule (7)
28.	FC Vidauban (9)	2–3	AS Cagnes-Le Cros (7)
29.	FC Istres (7)	3–1	SC Montredon Bonneveine (8)
30.	US Plan de Grasse (8)	1–0	CJ Antibes (8)
31.	FC Luberon (9)	1–3	FA Val Durance (7)
32.	JS St Jean-Beaulieu (6)	3–3 (5–4 p)	RO Menton (6)

=== Normandie ===
These matches were played on 11 September 2016.

Third round results: Normandie

Tie no	Home team (tier)	Score	Away team (tier)
1.	US Lyroise (10)	0–3	CO Cléon (8)
2.	ASPTT Rouen (11)	2–4	St Aubin FC (7)
3.	Stade Sottevillais CC (6)	2–1 (a.e.t.)	AS Madrillet Château Blanc (7)
4.	FC St Étienne-du-Rovray (8)	1–5	GCO Bihorel (7)
5.	FC Rouen (6)	1–1 (0–3 p)	Évreux FC (5)
6.	Saint Marcel Foot (8)	3–1	FC Serquigny-Nassandres (9)
7.	Pacy Ménilles RC (6)	2–0	Romilly/Pont-St Pierre FC (6)
8.	Mont-St-Aignan FC (8)	1–3	US Gasny (6)
9.	CS Andelys (9)	1–4	Grand-Quevilly FC (6)
10.	SC Thiberville (11)	3–2	FUSC Bois-Guillaume (6)
11.	AS Routot (11)	0–4	FC Gisors Vexin Normand (8)
12.	FC Illiers-l'Évêque (10)	1–2	RC Caudebecais (8)
13.	ES Normanville (9)	2–3 (a.e.t.)	Stade Porte Normande Vernon (8)
14.	ES Vallée de l'Oison (8)	3–2	FC Bonsecours-St Léger (8)
15.	ES Tourville (10)	0–2	Olympique Pavillais (7)
16.	Amicale Mixte des Neiges (7)	2–7	JS St Nicolas-d'Aliermont (7)
17.	FC Fréville-Bouville SIVOM (10)	1–4	AS Ourville (9)
18.	US Lillebonne (8)	3–2	US Tréfileries (7)
19.	Havre Caucriauville Sportif (8)	1–2	AL Déville-Maromme (6)
20.	US Normande 76 (11)	0–10	CMS Oissel (5)
21.	AS Plateau (8)	2–4	Eu FC (6)
22.	SC Frileuse (6)	4–1	US Luneraysienne (7)
23.	ES Arques (9)	1–3	AS Mesnières-en-Bray (9)
24.	St Romain AC (6)	1–3	ESM Gonfreville (6)
25.	AS Montivilliers (9)	2–1	US Godervillais (9)
26.	CS Gravenchon (9)	1–4	USF Fécamp (7)
27.	AS Fauvillaise (6)	1–3	CSSM Le Havre (8)
28.	FC Offranville (8)	0–2	Yvetot AC (7)
29.	FC Copains d'Abord (14)	0–3	US Bolbec (8)

=== Rhône-Alpes ===
These matches were played on 10 and 11 September 2016.

Third round results: Rhône-Alpes

Tie no	Home team (tier)	Score	Away team (tier)
1.	FCS Rumilly Albanais (8)	0–2	Olympique Belleroche Villefranche (9)
2.	US Gières (7)	0–0 (7–8 p)	FC Échirolles (6)
3.	US Davézieux-Vidalon (11)	3–6 (a.e.t.)	FC Vaulx-en-Velin (6)
4.	UGA Lyon-Décines (7)	3–1	AS Bron Grand Lyon (7)
5.	US Annemasse (9)	0–1	Aix-les-Bains FC (6)
6.	Chassieu Décines FC (7)	5–4 (a.e.t.)	GS Dervaux Chambon-Feugerolles (7)
7.	US Venissieux (9)	0–5	UMS Montélimar (6)
8.	US St Julien-en-Genevois (10)	0–7	Cluses-Scionzier FC (6)
9.	AG Bons-en-Chablais (11)	1–3	CS Amphion Publier (7)
10.	FC La Filière (12)	1–2	ES Cernex (10)
11.	Ain Sud Foot (6)	2–1	ES Bressan Marboz (7)
12.	Entente Crest-Aouste (9)	1–1 (4–1 p)	AS Ver Sau (9)
13.	FC Lyon (7)	1–0 (Note: The game was abandoned by the referee after 75 minutes, when stones were thrown by visiting fans. AS Minguettes Vénissieux were penalised. FC Lyon progressed to the fourth round.)	AS Minguettes Vénissieux (7)
14.	Olympique Villefontaine (13)	4–3	Muroise Foot (11)
15.	US Mont Blanc (9)	1–0	US Divonne (8)
16.	ES Fillinges (10)	2–2 (4–2 p)	Ambérieu FC (7)
17.	Concordia FC Bellegarde (10)	2–0	ES Thyez (8)
18.	FC Dingy (11)	0–2	US Annecy-le-Vieux (8)
19.	ES Chilly (9)	1–7	ES Vallières (7)
20.	Échenevex-Ségny-Chevry Olympique (10)	0–2	Marignier Sports (9)
21.	Formafoot Bièvre Valloire (11)	0–1	FC Chéran (8)
22.	Haut Giffre FC (11)	2–1	FC Ballaison (9)
23.	CS La Balme-de-Sillingy (11)	1–2 (a.e.t.)	Bellegarde Sports (11)
24.	CSL Perrignier (12)	1–9	Ville-la-Grand FC (10)
25.	FC Cruseilles (7)	3–1 (a.e.t.)	AS Montréal-la-Cluse (8)
26.	ES Seynod (9)	1–0	FC Thônes (10)
27.	ES Amancy (8)	3–0	Oyonnax Plastics Vallée FC (7)
28.	CS Viriat (8)	1–2	FC La Tour-St Clair (6)
29.	Olympique St Denis-lès-Bourg (9)	1–2	FC Veyle Sâone (7)
30.	AS Vertrieu (11)	2–5	FC Belle Étoile Mercury (10)
31.	Chambost-Allières-St Just-d'Avray (11)	0–3	UF Belleville St Jean-d'Ardières (7)
32.	US Replonges (10)	3–2 (a.e.t.)	US Jassans (10)
33.	FC Bressans (9)	3–3 (4–3 p)	US Feillens (8)
34.	US Pont-de-Vaux-Arbigny (10)	4–2	Union Nord Iséroise (11)
35.	CS Miribel (12)	2–6	CS Lagnieu (8)
36.	FC Serrières-Villebois (11)	0–2	Sud Azergues Foot (9)
37.	JS Chambéry (8)	6–0	ES Foissiat-Étrez (9)
38.	Amicale Tunisienne St Martin-d'Hères (12)	0–1 (a.e.t.)	AS Grièges-Pont-de-Veyle (11)
39.	ES Ambronay-St Jean-le-Vieux (11)	0–9	FC Pontcharra-St Loup (9)
40.	SC Portes de l'Ain (8)	0–2	FC Bords de Saône (7)
41.	FO Bourg (10)	1–1 (4–2 p)	CS Neuville (8)
42.	FCO Chandieu (11)	2–6	Football Côte St André (8)
43.	Nivolet FC (8)	6–0	AC Seyssinet (7)
44.	AS Italienne Européenne Grenoble (10)	4–1	FC St Baldoph (9)
45.	FC Vallée de la Gresse (7)	2–4 (a.e.t.)	FC Bourgoin-Jallieu (5)
46.	AS St André-le-Gaz (10)	0–3	FC Haute Tarentaise (9)
47.	FC Balmes Nord-Isère (10)	1–7	Chambéry Savoie Football (6)
48.	Claix Football (10)	1–6	ES Manival (8)
49.	AS Bozel Mont Jovet (11)	0–14	Olympique St Marcellin (7)
50.	US Reventin (11)	1–2	US Grand Colombier (9)
51.	AS Cheyssieu (12)	0–11	ES Tarentaise (8)
52.	ASL St Cassien (10)	1–2	OC Eybens (9)
53.	FC Allobroges Asafia (9)	1–6	AS Misérieux-Trévoux (7)
54.	ES Drumettaz-Mouxy (9)	2–3	SO Pont-de-Chéruy-Chavanoz (8)
55.	Cognin Sports (9)	1–3	MOS Trois Rivières (7)
56.	CA Maurienne (10)	2–0	Vallée du Guiers FC (8)
57.	St Chamond Foot (7)	2–3 (a.e.t.)	Côte Chaude Sportif (6)
58.	CS Cremeaux (11)	0–3	FC Roche-St Genest (7)
59.	Olympique Le Coteau (11)	0–3	Roannais Foot 42 (7)
60.	USG La Fouillouse (9)	2–3 (a.e.t.)	CO St Fons (9)
61.	ES Cormoranche (10)	0–2	Football Mont-Pilat (9)
62.	CAS Cheminots Oullins Lyon (10)	4–4 (4–5 p)	US Metare St Étienne Sud-Est (8)
63.	OC Ondaine (10)	1–6	US Feurs (7)
64.	FC Rive Droite (10)	4–2	USF Tarare (11)
65.	AF Pays de Coise (10)	1–3	US Millery-Vourles (8)
66.	US St Galmier-Chambœuf (8)	0–8	FC Rhône Vallées (6)
67.	JS Cellieu (11)	2–0	AS Chambéon-Magneux (9)
68.	FC Roanne Clermont (9)	3–1	ES Lamurien (8)
69.	FC Gerland (10)	0–5	AS Savigneux-Montbrison (8)
70.	FC Bourguisan (11)	2–4	FC Commelle-Vernay (9)
71.	COS Montreynaud (12)	0–9	FC Limonest Saint-Didier (5)
72.	US Sud Forézienne (10)	3–1	Roanne Matel SFC (11)
73.	CA St Georges-de-Reneins (11)	0–4	US Villars (8)
74.	US Meyzieu (9)	1–2	FC Chabeuil (9)
75.	AL St Maurice-l'Exil (9)	1–0	FC Salaise (7)
76.	AS Chavanay (7)	1–3	AS Saint-Priest (5)
77.	ES St Jean-Bonnefonds (11)	2–4	AS Montchat Lyon (8)
78.	AS Portugaise Vaulx-en-Velin (11)	2–6	Olympique St Genis-Laval (7)
79.	FC Crolles-Bernin (10)	4–3	AS Rhodanienne (10)
80.	FC Val Lyonnais (8)	4–2	FC Charvieu-Chavagneux (7)
81.	FC Corbas (10)	6–2	FC St Charles Vigilante (11)
82.	FC Ste Foy-lès-Lyon (10)	1–3	Feyzin Club Belle Étoile (8)
83.	FC Péageois (8)	5–0	US Pont-La Roche (9)
84.	ES Haut Forez (11)	1–3	Isle d'Abeau FC (10)
85.	AS St Cyr-les-Vignes (11)	1–0	Lyon Ouest SC (8)
86.	ES Rachais (8)	3–0	CS Verpillière (9)
87.	AS Genay (10)	1–4	L'Étrat-La Tour Sportif (8)
88.	Ménival FC (10)	1–1 (4–2 p)	FC Chaponnay-Marennes (8)
89.	Olympique Nord Dauphiné (8)	0–1 (a.e.t.)	Hauts Lyonnais (6)
90.	FC Eyrieux Embroye (9)	4–1	US Mours (9)
91.	AS Homenetmen Bourg-lès Valence (11)	0–1	CO Châteauneuvois (10)
92.	FC Larnage-Serves (11)	1–2	AS Véore Montoison (8)
93.	Entente Sarras Sports St Vallier (10)	1–3	ES Veauche (8)
94.	AS Valensolles (11)	3–0	Olympique St Montanais (11)
95.	Vivar SC Soyons (11)	0–1	Olympique Ruomsois (8)
96.	ES Sorbiers (10)	4–2	FC Vallon-Pont-d'Arc (11)
97.	AS St Lattier (12)	0–3	Sud Lyonnais Foot (8)
98.	ES Nord Drôme (11)	0–4	Valence FC (8)
99.	FC Bourg-lès-Valence (10)	2–1	SC Cruas (6)
100.	FC Montmiral-Parnans (12)	0–1	SC Romans (10)
101.	AS Dolon (11)	4–0	US St Martin-de-Valamas (12)
102.	US Portes Hautes Cévennes (8)	0–2	Caluire SC (7)
103.	FC Valdaine (9)	1–2	Domtac FC (7)
104.	SC Bourguesan (12)	4–3	AS Portugaise Valence (10)
105.	AS Villefontaine (11)	5–0	CSA Poisy (10)

== Fourth round ==
=== French Guiana ===
These matches were played between 22 and 25 September 2016.

Fourth round results: French Guiana

Tie no	Home team (tier)	Score	Away team (tier)
1.	(French Guiana) ASC Remire (DH)	1–3	CSC Cayenne (DH) (French Guiana)
2.	(French Guiana) EF Iracoubo (PH)	0–1	US Matoury (DH) (French Guiana)
3.	(French Guiana) ASC Corossony (PH)	0–1	SC Kouroucien (DH) (French Guiana)
4.	(French Guiana) AJ Balata Abriba (PH)	1–2	FC Oyapock (PH) (French Guiana)
5.	(French Guiana) AJ Saint-Georges (PH)	0–3	ASU Grand Santi (DH) (French Guiana)
6.	(French Guiana) ASC Agouado (DH)	2–1	USC Montsinery (PH) (French Guiana)
7.	(French Guiana) US Macouria (DH)	2–3 (a.e.t.)	Le Geldar De Kourou (DH) (French Guiana)
8.	(French Guiana) ASC Kawina (non)	2–1	Kourou FC (DH) (French Guiana)

Note: French Guiana League Structure (no promotion to French League Structure):
Division d'Honneur (DH)
Promotion d'Honneur (PH)

=== Guadeloupe ===
These matches were played on 23 and 24 September 2016.

Fourth round results: Guadeloupe

Tie no	Home team (tier)	Score	Away team (tier)
1.	(Guadeloupe) JS Vieux-Habitants (PH)	1–3	RC de Basse-Terre (PHR) (Guadeloupe)
2.	(Guadeloupe) CS Moulien (DH)	6–1	Rapid Club (PH) (Guadeloupe)
3.	(Guadeloupe) CS Capesterre Belle Eau (DH)	3–1	La Gauloise de Basse-Terre (DH) (Guadeloupe)
4.	(Guadeloupe) St Claude FC (PH)	1–4	US Ste Rose (DH) (Guadeloupe)
5.	(Guadeloupe) Cactus Ste Anne (PHR)	4–0	St. Lamentinois (PH) (Guadeloupe)
6.	(Guadeloupe) USBM (DH)	6–5	Et Morne-à-l'Eau (PHR) (Guadeloupe)
7.	(Guadeloupe) Siroco Les Abymes (DH)	0–2	Phare du Canal (DH) (Guadeloupe)
8.	(Guadeloupe) ANJE (PHR)	1–2	Unar (PHR) (Guadeloupe)

Note: Guadeloupe League Structure (no promotion to French League Structure):
Division d'Honneur (DH)
Promotion d'Honneur Régionale (PHR)
Promotion d'Honneur (PH)
Première Division (PD)

=== Martinique ===
These matches were played on 16 and 17 September 2016.

Fourth round results: Martinique

Tie no	Home team (tier)	Score	Away team (tier)
1.	(Martinique) RC Rivière-Pilote (LR1)	3–1	Aiglon (LR1) (Martinique)
2.	(Martinique) RC Lorrain (LR2)	1–2	New Star (LR1) (Martinique)
3.	(Martinique) AS New Club (LR1)	1–1 (2–4 p)	Eclair (LR2) (Martinique)
4.	(Martinique) UJ Monnérot (LR3)	1–3	Club Franciscain (LR1) (Martinique)
5.	(Martinique) AS Samaritaine (LR2)	1–7	Golden Lion FC (LR1) (Martinique)
6.	(Martinique) US Diamantinoise (LR1)	3–1	Excelsior (LR1) (Martinique)
7.	(Martinique) Club Colonial (LR1)	2–3 (a.e.t.)	JS Eucalyptus (LR1) (Martinique)
8.	(Martinique) Golden Star (LR1)	2–1 (a.e.t.)	RC St Joseph (LR2) (Martinique)

Note: Martinique League Structure (no promotion to French League Structure):
Ligue Régionale 1 (LR1)
Ligue Régionale 2 (LR2)
Ligue Régionale 3 (LR3)

=== Mayotte ===
These matches played on 4 June 2016

Fourth round results: Mayotte

Tie no	Home team (tier)	Score	Away team (tier)
1.	(Mayotte) UCS Sada (DHT)	1–0	AS Neige (DH) (Mayotte)
2.	(Mayotte) FC Mtsapéré (DH)	0–0 (a.e.t.) (4–3 p)	Foudre 2000 (DH) (Mayotte)
3.	(Mayotte) FC Labattoir (DHT)	1–0	ASC Kawéni (DHT) (Mayotte)
4.	(Mayotte) ASC Abeilles (DH)	1–0 (a.e.t.)	AS Racine du Nord (DHT) (Mayotte)

Note: Mayotte League Structure (no promotion to French League Structure):
Division d'Honneur (DH)
Division d'Honneur Territoriale (DHT)
Promotion d'Honneur (PH)

=== Réunion ===
These matches were played on 17 and 18 September 2016.

Fourth round results: Réunion

Tie no	Home team (tier)	Score	Away team (tier)
1.	(Réunion) Vincendo Sport (D2D)	1–3	ASC Grands Bois (D2R) (Réunion)
2.	(Réunion) AS Capricorne (D1R)	0–1	AS Saint-Suzanne (D1R) (Réunion)
3.	(Réunion) Trois Bassins FC (D2R)	0–3	AS Excelsior (D1R) (Réunion)
4.	(Réunion) AF Saint-Louisien (D2R)	0–2	JS Saint-Pierroise (D1R) (Réunion)

Note: Reúnion League Structure (no promotion to French League Structure):
Division 1 Régionale (D1R)
Division 2 Régionale (D2R)
Division 2 Départementale (D2D)
Division 3 Départementale (D3D)

=== Paris-Île-de-France ===
These matches were played on 24 and 25 September 2016.

Fourth round results: Île-de-France

Tie no	Home team (tier)	Score	Away team (tier)
1.	FC Versailles 78 (6)	4–0	US Lusitanos Saint-Maur (4)
2.	Issy-les-Moulineaux (6)	0–1	UJA Maccabi Paris Métropole (5)
3.	US Torcy (8)	0–2	USM Malakoff (9)
4.	RC Arpajonnais (11)	4–2	USA Clichy (9)
5.	FC Bourget (11)	3–4 (a.e.t.)	Olympique Adamois (7)
6.	ES Guyancourt St Quentin-en-Yvelines (10)	0–1	JA Drancy (4)
7.	ASA Issy (7)	3–1	AS Saint-Ouen-l'Aumône (5)
8.	FC Livry-Gargan (8)	2–4	AF Bobigny (6)
9.	Cosmo Taverny (9)	2–1 (a.e.t.)	Évry FC (6)
10.	AS Bondy (10)	1–2	Saint-Brice FC (7)
11.	ES Trappes (9)	2–2 (5–4 p)	CA Paris (8)
12.	US Grigny (9)	3–1	Osny FC (10)
13.	FCM Garges-Les-Gonesse (10)	1–4	OFC Les Mureaux (6)
14.	Mitry-Mory (10)	5–4	CSM Bonneuil-sur-Marne (9)
15.	CO Les Ulis (6)	0–2	Entente SSG (4)
16.	Mantes USC (14)	0–5	FC St Leu (8)
17.	SO Rosny-sous-Bois (11)	2–8	FC Fleury 91 (4)
18.	Noisy-le-Grand FC (8)	1–0 (a.e.t.)	US Ivry (5)
19.	USBS Épône (12)	0–4	Tremplin Foot (9)
20.	US Vaires-sur-Marne (9)	3–0	CAP Charenton (10)
21.	Bagnolet FC (11)	3–2	FC Les Lilas (6)
22.	COM Bagneux (10)	0–1 (a.e.t.)	Sainte-Geneviève Sports (5)
23.	Gargenville Stade (11)	2–7	US Sénart-Moissy (5)
24.	FC Maisons Alfort (9)	4–1	ES Stains (11)
25.	FC Solitaires Paris Est (10)	2–1	SCM Châtillonnais (11)
26.	FC Montfermeil (9)	0–3	Olympique Noisy-le-Sec (5)
27.	ASC Velizy (11)	1–6	Champigny FC 94 (7)
28.	JS Suresnes (9)	1–1 (3–2 p)	AC Boulogne-Billancourt (4)
29.	ES Petit Anges Paris (13)	0–7	Le Mée Sports (6)
30.	Villemomble Sports (6)	1–4	FCM Aubervilliers (5)
31.	RFC Argenteuil (8)	0–1	FC Gobelins (6)
32.	US Alfortville (9)	2–0	AS Val de Fontenay (9)
33.	Olympique Montigny (11)	0–2	AS Ultra Marine Paris (13)
34.	FC Athis Mons (11)	0–9	AS Poissy (4)
35.	SC Gretz-Tournan (10)	0–1	CA Vitry (9)
36.	ES Colombienne (8)	0–1	Claye-Souilly SF (9)
37.	FC Bry (8)	2–5	Val d'Europe FC (8)
38.	UF Clichois (10)	1–2	Montrouge FC 92 (8)
39.	FC Asnières (12)	0–5	Blanc Mesnil SF (6)
40.	Salésienne de Paris (11)	0–4	FC Mantes (4)
41.	Villeneuve-la-Garenne (11)	1–4	ES Viry-Châtillon (4)
42.	ES Vitry (10)	0–1	ES Parisienne (9)

=== Bourgogne ===
These matches were played on 24 and 25 September 2016.

Fourth round results: Bourgogne

Tie no	Home team (tier)	Score	Away team (tier)
1.	ASC Plombières-Lès-Dijon (8)	0–3	FC Montceau (4)
2.	FC Sens (6)	4–0	FR Saint Marcel (7)
3.	US Cheminots Dijonnais (7)	1–3	FC Gueugnon (5)
4.	ALC Longvic (7)	5–0	ESA Breuil (8)
5.	Réveil Is-sur-Tille (7)	1–2	US Cheminots Paray (7)
6.	US Sennecey-le-Grand et Son Canton (9)	0–2	UF Mâconnais (6)
7.	FC Chassagne-Montrachet (9)	0–1	Digoin FCA (8)
8.	AS Quetigny (6)	0–0 (4–2 p)	CO Avallonnais (6)
9.	SC Mâcon (10)	3–1	JS Crechoise (7)
10.	SR Clayettois (9)	1–9	CS Louhans-Cuiseaux (5)
11.	US Meursault (7)	1–2	US St Sernin-du-Bois (6)
12.	AS Chablis (9)	0–6	Paron FC (6)
13.	Stade Auxerrois (6)	1–4	SC Selongey (5)
14.	FC Chevannes (10)	2–3	AS Châtenoy-le-Royal (8)
15.	AS Genlis (8)	3–1	AS Beaune (7)
16.	AS Magny (9)	1–5	AS Clamecy (7)

=== Auvergne ===
These matches were played on 24 and 25 September 2016.

Fourth round results: Auvergne

Tie no	Home team (tier)	Score	Away team (tier)
1.	CS Bessay (9)	2–1	AS Louchy (9)
2.	AS Domerat (6)	0–3	AS Yzeure (4)
3.	SC St Pourcain (10)	3–3 (3–4 p)	CS Volvic (6)
4.	FC Aurillac Arpajon CA (5)	1–2	Le Puy Foot (4)
5.	US St Georges / Les Ancizes (6)	0–2	Montluçon Football (6)
6.	US Doyet (9)	0–2	AS Moulins (7)
7.	FCUS Ambert (7)	2–3	SA Thiers (6)
8.	AS Romagnat (11)	1–2	US Mozac (9)
9.	Sauveteurs Brivois (11)	2–0	US St Flour (7)
10.	US La Chapelle-Laurent (11)	0–5	Entente Nord Lozere (6)
11.	Bourbon Sportif (9)	1–4	FC Riom (7)
12.	AS Cheminots St Germain (10)	3–1	SCA Cussét (8)
13.	CSA Brassacois Florinois (9)	0–12	FC Cournon (5)
14.	AS Livradois Sud (9)	1–4	AA Lapalisse (7)
15.	Lempdes Sport (6)	1–2	Ass. Vergongheon-Arvant (7)
16.	US Vic-le-Comte (8)	2–3	RC Vichy (6)
17.	FC Coltines (11)	1–5	AS Emblavez-Vorey (8)
18.	Velay FC (6)	1–3	Ytrac Foot (6)
19.	FA Le Cendre (8)	5–1 (a.e.t.)	FC Espaly (6)
20.	FC Dunières (10)	1–3	Sporting Chataigneraie Cantal (7)

=== Lower Normandy ===
These matches were played on 24 and 25 September 2016.

Fourth round results: Lower Normandy

Tie no	Home team (tier)	Score	Away team (tier)
1.	AS Potigny-Villers-Canivet-Ussy (8)	1–3	AS Trouville-Deauville (6)
2.	Maladrerie OS (6)	2–2 (4–5 p)	SU Dives-Cabourg (5)
3.	FC Saint-Lô Manche (6)	1–2 (a.e.t.)	AF Virois (6)
4.	FC Flers (6)	4–2	CS Honfleur (7)
5.	US Ouest Cotentin (8)	3–0	USI Bessin Nord (9)
6.	ASPTT Caen (6)	2–0	AS Brécey (7)
7.	SC Hérouvillais (6)	0–3	AS Cherbourg (7)
8.	CS Carentan (8)	0–2	US Granville (4)
9.	AS Jullouville-Sartilly (10)	0–2 (a.e.t.)	FC Équeurdreville-Hainneville (8)
10.	US Flerienne (11)	0–1 (a.e.t.)	ES Coutances (6)
11.	FC Agon-Coutainville (8)	0–2	Agneaux FC (7)
12.	SL Pétruvien (9)	0–2	JS Douvres (7)
13.	AS St Cyr-Fervaques (9)	0–3	LC Bretteville-sur-Odon (7)
14.	FC Argences (10)	0–5	US Alençon (6)
15.	Inter Odon FC (8)	0–1	USON Mondeville (6)

=== Centre-Val de Loire ===
These matches were played on 24 and 25 September 2016.

Fourth round results: Centre-Val de Loire

Tie no	Home team (tier)	Score	Away team (tier)
1.	SMOC St Jean-de-Braye (7)	1–2	FC Drouais (5)
2.	AS Montlouis-sur-Loire (7)	0–3	FC Chartres (4)
3.	SA Issoudun (7)	2–3 (a.e.t.)	Blois Foot 41 (5)
4.	Vierzon FC (6)	1–2 (a.e.t.)	Bourges 18 (5)
5.	ES Oésienne (8)	0–3	SO Romorantin (4)
6.	FC St Jean-le-Blanc (7)	0–1	Avoine OCC (5)
7.	AS St Amandoise (6)	1–4	Saint-Pryvé Saint-Hilaire FC (5)
8.	Espérance Hippolytaine (11)	0–1 (a.e.t.)	AS Chouzy-Onzain (8)
9.	AS Contres (8)	2–1	CA Pithiviers (7)
10.	AS Monts (8)	0–1	FC Ouest Tournageau (6)
11.	FC St Georges-sur-Eure (7)	4–3 (a.e.t.)	AS Portugais Bourges (7)
12.	Amicale Épernon (8)	0–4	Chartres Horizon (6)
13.	US Vendôme (8)	0–2	Bourges Foot (6)
14.	J3S Amilly (7)	4–1	US Châteauneuf-sur-Loire (6)
15.	Étoile Bleue St Cyr-sur-Loire (6)	0–1	USM Saran (6)

=== Centre-West ===
These matches were played on 23, 24 and 25 September 2016.

Fourth round results: Centre-West

Tie no	Home team (tier)	Score	Away team (tier)
1.	Limoges FC (5)	3–0	CS Feytiat (6)
2.	CA St Savin-St Germain (8)	3–1	SO Châtellerault (6)
3.	JA Isle (6)	2–4 (a.e.t.)	Angoulême CFC (5)
4.	Poitiers FC (6)	5–1	UES Montmorillon (6)
5.	US Bessines/Morterolles (7)	1–5	AS St Pantaleon (7)
6.	UA Cognac (6)	0–1	FC Bressuire (5)
7.	FC Charente Limousine (9)	1–3	AS Aixois (7)
8.	FC Sévigné Jonzac-St Germain (11)	2–1	SS Ste Féréole (9)
9.	AS Montguyon (10)	2–1 (a.e.t.)	ES St Sulpice-le-Guérétois (9)
10.	Royan Vaux AFC (7)	1–4	AS Échiré St Gelais (6)
11.	AS Réthaise (7)	1–1 (1–4 p)	ES La Rochelle (6)
12.	US Courlay (10)	0–1 (a.e.t.)	ES Saintes (7)
13.	US Chauvigny (6)	7–1	AS Gouzon (7)
14.	CA Neuville (7)	4–1 (a.e.t.)	SC St Jean-d'Angély (6)
15.	Avenir Bellac-Berneuil-St Junien-les-Combes (9)	1–3	ES Aiglons Briviste (7)
16.	AS Puymoyen (9)	1–5	Stade Ruffec (9)
17.	JS Semussac (10)	2–3	OL St Liguaire Niort (6)
18.	FC Pays Argentonnais (10)	3–0	ES Beaumont-St Cyr (8)
19.	SEPC Exireuil (12)	1–3	AS Cozes (5)
20.	US Mauzé-sur-le-Mignon (11)	0–4	UA Niort St Florent (8)
21.	Stade Vouillé (11)	1–3	SA Moncoutant (9)
22.	FC Fontaine-le-Comte (9)	1–1 (1–3 p)	Thouars Foot 79 (6)
23.	US Usson-du-Poitou (12)	3–2 (a.e.t.)	US Mélusine (10)
24.	AS Panazol (10)	5–0	AS Nexon (10)

=== Corsica ===
These matches were played on 25 September 2016.

Fourth round results: Corsica

Tie no	Home team (tier)	Score	Away team (tier)
1.	AS Santa Reparata (8)	1–8	AS Casinca (6)
2.	FC Aleria (7)	1–7	FB Île-Rousse (5)
3.	AS Luri (9)	1–3	SC Bocognano Gravona (6)
4.	USC Corte (6)	2–2 (4–1 p)	ÉF Bastia (6)
5.	JS Bonifacio (7)	1–6	Gallia Club Lucciana (6)
6.	CA Propriano (6)	1–2	Borgo FC (5)
7.	FC Bastelicaccia (6)	1–4	AS Furiani-Agliani (5)

=== Franche-Comté ===
These matches were played on 24 and 25 September 2016.

Fourth round results: Franche-Comté

Tie no	Home team (tier)	Score	Away team (tier)
1.	CA Pontarlier (5)	2–0	Entente Roche-Novillars (6)
2.	Besançon FC (5)	2–1	AS Ornans (5)
3.	Jura Lacs Foot (7)	1–2	FC Valdahon-Vercel (7)
4.	Jura Dolois Foot (6)	2–0	FC Noidanais (7)
5.	AS Luxeuil (8)	1–4	FC Champagnole (6)
6.	FC L'Isle-sur-le-Doubs (7)	0–1 (a.e.t.)	AS Audincourt (8)
7.	AS Château de Joux (8)	4–1	AS Baume-les-Dames (6)
8.	FC Montfaucon-Morre-Gennes-La Vèze (7)	2–3	US Les Écorces (8)
9.	ES Entre Roches (8)	1–3	FC Grandvillars (6)
10.	US St Vit (6)	0–3	Jura Sud Foot (4)
11.	Olympique Montbéliard (9)	1–3	AS Levier (6)

=== Languedoc-Roussillon ===
These matches were played on 24 and 25 September 2016.

Fourth round results: Languedoc-Roussillon

Tie no	Home team (tier)	Score	Away team (tier)
1.	CE Palavas (6)	4–2	FA Carcassonne (6)
2.	Canet Roussillon FC (6)	3–1	FC Sète 34 (4)
3.	Stade Beaucairois (7)	1–1 (5–4 p)	RCO Agde (5)
4.	AEC St Gilles (7)	0–2	ES Paulhan-Pézenas (4)
5.	Trèbes FC (7)	1–1 (2–4 p)	Marvejols Sports (7)
6.	La Clermontaise Football (7)	3–2	FU Narbonne (6)
7.	Pointe Courte AC Sète (9)	2–1	SC Anduzien (7)
8.	AS St Paulet (9)	0–4	AS Fabrègues (5)
9.	AS Badaroux (9)	1–0	AS Perpignan Méditerranée (7)
10.	US Béziers (8)	2–5	Castelnau Le Crès FC (6)
11.	US Minervois (8)	1–6	FC Bagnols Pont (6)
12.	GC Uchaud (7)	4–1	FC Briolet (7)
13.	AS Puissalicon-Magalas (9)	1–3 (a.e.t.)	US Conques (7)
14.	RC Vedasien (9)	0–1	AS St Privat-des-Vieux (8)
15.	US Salinières Aigues Mortes (6)	0–4	AF Lozère (5)
16.	AS Frontignan AC (6)	2–0	AS Lattoise (6)
17.	FC Val de Cèze (7)	2–5	FC Chusclan-Laudun-l'Ardoise (8)
18.	Olympique Alenya (8)	0–4	Olympique Alès (5)
19.	Entente St Clément-Montferrier (6)	5–1	AS Gignacaise (7)

=== Maine ===
These matches were played on 24 and 25 September 2016.

Fourth round results: Maine

Tie no	Home team (tier)	Score	Away team (tier)
1.	SA Mamertins (6)	4–0	VS Fertois (6)
2.	US Nautique Spay (8)	0–1	Le Mans FC (5)
3.	SS Noyen-sur-Sarthe (8)	2–4	CO St Saturnin Arche (6)
4.	JS Coulaines (6)	0–2	RC Fléchois (5)
5.	US Bazouges-Cré (7)	2–1	ES Moncé (7)
6.	Beaumont SA (9)	3–0	AS Mulsanne-Teloché (6)
7.	EG Rouillon (9)	0–0 (6–7 p)	AS Le Mans Villaret (7)
8.	US Laval (8)	0–8	La Suze FC (6)
9.	Patriote Brulonnaise (7)	0–5	Sablé FC (5)
10.	Ernéenne Foot (8)	2–1	Ancienne Château-Gontier (6)
11.	Louverné Sports (7)	0–4	US Changé (5)
12.	ES Bonchamp (6)	1–0	AS Bourny Laval (6)

=== Midi-Pyrénées ===
These matches were played on 23, 24 and 25 September 2016.

Fourth round results: Midi-Pyrénées

Tie no	Home team (tier)	Score	Away team (tier)
1.	Figeac Quercy (9)	2–0	Entente Golfech-St Paul-d'Espis (6)
2.	Élan Marivalois (9)	0–3	Blagnac FC (6)
3.	Étoile Aussonnaise (7)	1–2	Tarbes Pyrénées Football (4)
4.	FC Lourdais XI (7)	1–2	Balma SC (5)
5.	Saint-Alban Aucamville FC (6)	1–3	AS Muretaine (6)
6.	Olympique Girou FC (6)	0–4	Toulouse Rodéo FC (5)
7.	FC Marssac-Rivières-Senouillac Rives du Tarn (7)	1–2	Rodez AF (4)
8.	FC Pays Mazamétain (8)	1–2	Onet-le-Château (6)
9.	Luc Primaube FC (6)	3–2	US Albi (6)
10.	Luzenac AP (6)	1–0 (a.e.t.)	Toulouse Métropole FC (6)
11.	Auch Football (6)	6–1	AS Portet-Carrefour-Récébédou (7)
12.	SC Sébazac (9)	3–1	Druelle FC (8)
13.	AS Fleurance-La Sauvetat (7)	2–0	US Seysses-Frouzins (8)
14.	FC St Girons (10)	0–1	ERCSO L'Isle-en-Dodon (8)
15.	Juillan OS (8)	1–1 (2–4 p)	FC Pavien (9)
16.	AS Bressols (9)	2–2 (5–4 p)	US Pibrac (7)
17.	US St Sulpice (9)	0–4	US Colomiers (4)
18.	Stade Villefranchois (8)	1–2	SC Lafrancaisain (9)
19.	St Orens FC (8)	6–0	FC Graulhet (9)
20.	FC Val d'Assou (11)	0–2	Toulouse ACF (8)
21.	SO Millau (9)	3–0	Entente St Georges/St Rome (9)
22.	JE Toulousaine Croix-Daurade (12)	0–3	US Cazères (7)
23.	AS Vallée du Sor (10)	0–4	Beaupuy-Montrabé-St Jean FC (7)
24.	Montauban AF (8)	0–1	US Castanéenne (5)

=== Aquitaine ===
These matches were played on 24 and 25 September 2016.

Fourth round results: Aquitaine

Tie no	Home team (tier)	Score	Away team (tier)
1.	Trélissac FC (4)	2–1	Aviron Bayonnaise FC (5)
2.	Biscarrosse OFC (7)	1–6	FC Bassin d'Arcachon (6)
3.	AS Facture-Biganos Boïens (9)	1–4	Bergerac Périgord FC (4)
4.	AS Pays de Montaigne et Gurçon (10)	0–5	SA Mérignac (6)
5.	FC Cendrieux-La Douze (11)	1–3	Hasparren FC (9)
6.	US Mussidan-St Medard (9)	3–1	SU Agen (7)
7.	US St Denis-de-Pile (10)	1–3	US Lège Cap Ferret (5)
8.	Hiriburuko Ainhara (8)	0–0 (4–2 p)	FC Libourne (6)
9.	FC Estuaire Haute Gironde (6)	1–2	Langon FC (6)
10.	US Alliance Talençaise (8)	2–0	AS Antonne-Le Change (8)
11.	FCE Mérignac Arlac (6)	1–0	US Lormont (6)
12.	ES Audenge (8)	0–6	Stade Montois (4)
13.	AS Bretagne-de-Marsan (11)	0–3	FC Doazit (9)
14.	ES Meillon-Assat-Narcastet (8)	0–2	Stade Bordelais ASPTT (5)
15.	Seignosse-Capbreton-Soutsons FC (9)	1–2	Genêts Anglet (5)
16.	SA Mauléonais (9)	2–2 (8–7 p)	ES Montoise (9)
17.	FC Tartas-St Yaguen (6)	1–2	La Brède FC (7)
18.	FC Lescar (8)	2–1	Jeunesse Villenave (6)
19.	AS Taillan (9)	2–1	Limens FC (9)
20.	ES Blanquefort (7)	0–3	JA Biarritz (6)
21.	US La Catte (8)	1–2	AS Gensac-Montcaret (9)
22.	FC St André-de-Cubzac (8)	0–2	FC des Graves (7)
23.	SAG Cestas (6)	2–2 (5–3 p)	FC Marmande 47 (5)

=== Atlantique ===
These matches were played on 24 and 25 September 2016.

Fourth round results: Atlantique

Tie no	Home team (tier)	Score	Away team (tier)
1.	La Malouine Football (9)	0–4	GS St Sébastien (7)
2.	ES Pineaux (10)	1–2	St Pierre de Retz (8)
3.	AS Longeron-Torfou (11)	0–6	USSA Vertou (5)
4.	ASC St Médard-de-Doulon Nantes (9)	1–4	Orvault SF (6)
5.	US Toutlemonde Maulévrier (11)	0–2	AS Sud Loire (9)
6.	SA St Florent-des-Bois (11)	2–0	ES Maritime (9)
7.	FC Castel-Fiacrais (10)	0–2	Vendée Fontenay Foot (4)
8.	US Varades (10)	2–0	FC Essartais (7)
9.	AS La Châtaigneraie (7)	4–2 (a.e.t.)	Angers Vaillante Foot (7)
10.	ES Segré (6)	2–4	SC Beaucouzé (6)
11.	ES Côte de Lumière (8)	0–0 (2–3 p)	Stade Olonnais (9)
12.	Châtelais FC (11)	1–2	St Aubin-Guérande Football (7)
13.	ASR Machecoul (9)	0–2	Mareuil SC (8)
14.	FC Laurentais Landemontais (9)	0–1 (a.e.t.)	US Philbertine Football (7)
15.	St Pierre Mazières (10)	0–5	TVEC Les Sables-d'Olonne (6)
16.	Entente Sud Vendée (11)	0–2	FC Fief Gesté (11)
17.	Poiré-sur-Vie VF (6)	2–1	St Nazaire AF (6)
18.	AS Ponts-de-Cé (10)	2–0	LSG Les Brouzils (9)
19.	AS Vieillevigne-La Planche (8)	0–7	SO Cholet (4)
20.	AC Belle-Bielle (12)	0–12	La Roche VF (5)
21.	FC Beaupréau (8)	0–2	AC Pouzauges-Réaumur (7)
22.	USJA Carquefou (7)	1–2	Voltigeurs de Châteaubriant (4)
23.	FE Trélazé (7)	4–0	La France d'Aizenay (8)
24.	FC Mouchamps-Rochetrejoux (9)	0–3	Etoile de Clisson (9)
25.	Élan de Gorges Foot (8)	3–1	ES Bouchemaine (7)
26.	St Marc Football (11)	1–4	ES Dresny-Plessé (10)
27.	FC Sud Sèvre et Maine (10)	0–4	ASI Mûrs-Erigné (8)
28.	ES Montilliers (11)	4–4 (2–4 p)	FC Guémené-Massérac (12)
29.	EA La Tessoualle (9)	1–4	FC Rezé (6)
30.	Vigilante St Fulgent (9)	1–2	FC Challans (6)
31.	RC Ancenis 44 (7)	2–2 (1–4 p)	Olympique Saumur FC (6)

=== Méditerranée ===
These matches were played on 24 and 25 September 2016.

Fourth round results: Méditerranée

Tie no	Home team (tier)	Score	Away team (tier)
1.	FC Istres (7)	2–1	Salon Bel Air (6)
2.	Aubagne FC (5)	1–0	AS St Rémoise (6)
3.	SC Toulon (4)	1–2	Étoile Fréjus Saint-Raphaël (4)
4.	ARC Cavaillon (9)	0–3	FSC La Ciotat (9)
5.	ES Fosséenne (7)	0–0 (1–3 p)	FC Martigues (4)
6.	FA Val Durance (7)	2–0	Stade Maillanais (8)
7.	Nyons FC (8)	1–2	US Le Pontet (4)
8.	SC Jonquières (9)	2–2 (4–2 p)	Olympique Mallemortais (10)
9.	Berre SC (7)	4–1	US 1er Canton Marseille (7)
10.	Gap Foot 05 (7)	1–1 (2–4 p)	Marignane-Gignac FC (4)
11.	AS Cagnes-Le Cros (7)	0–3	Hyères FC (4)
12.	FCUS Tropézienne (8)	0–1	RC Grasse (5)
13.	AS Estérel (8)	2–1	AS Maximoise (6)
14.	US St Mandrier (8)	1–2	FC Rousset Ste Victoire (7)
15.	AS Cannes (6)	1–4	US Marseille Endoume (6)
16.	JS St Jean-Beaulieu (6)	0–1	US Mandelieu-La Napoule (7)
17.	US Pegomas (8)	1–1 (4–5 p)	ES Cannet-Rocheville (5)
18.	US Plan de Grasse (8)	2–1	US Cap d'Ail (7)
19.	AC Arlésien (7)	0–1	Espérance Pernoise (6)

=== Normandie ===
These matches were played on 24 and 25 September 2016.

Fourth round results: Normandie

Tie no	Home team (tier)	Score	Away team (tier)
1.	Évreux FC (5)	3–2	SC Frileuse (6)
2.	ESM Gonfreville (6)	3–0	Stade Sottevillais CC (6)
3.	Saint Marcel Foot (8)	1–2	CMS Oissel (5)
4.	AS Mesnières-en-Bray (9)	0–2	JS St Nicolas-d'Aliermont (7)
5.	USF Fécamp (7)	1–1 (4–1 p)	ES Vallée de l'Oison (8)
6.	US Bolbec (8)	2–3	Eu FC (6)
7.	AS Ourville (9)	1–3	US Lillebonne (8)
8.	CSSM Le Havre (8)	0–1	RC Caudebecais (8)
9.	GCO Bihorel (7)	2–2 (8–9 p)	AL Déville-Maromme (6)
10.	US Gasny (6)	3–1	Yvetot AC (7)
11.	Stade Porte Normande Vernon (8)	0–2	Grand-Quevilly FC (6)
12.	CO Cléon (8)	1–0	St Aubin FC (7)
13.	FC Gisors Vexin Normand (8)	0–1	Pacy Ménilles RC (6)
14.	SC Thiberville (11)	0–1	AS Montivilliers (9)
15.	Olympique Pavillais (7)	3–2	FC Dieppe (4)

=== Rhône-Alpes ===
These matches were played on 24 and 25 September 2016.

Fourth round results: Rhône-Alpes

Tie no	Home team (tier)	Score	Away team (tier)
1.	FC Chabeuil (9)	0–7	AS Saint-Priest (5)
2.	AS Grièges-Pont-de-Veyle (11)	0–4	ES Vallières (7)
3.	FC Bressans (9)	1–2	Aix-les-Bains FC (6)
4.	CS Lagnieu (8)	1–3	Cluses-Scionzier FC (6)
5.	SO Pont-de-Chéruy-Chavanoz (8)	1–2	FC Bourgoin-Jallieu (5)
6.	OC Eybens (9)	1–2	Domtac FC (7)
7.	US Feurs (7)	1–6	FC Limonest Saint-Didier (5)
8.	Olympique Belleroche Villefranche (9)	1–1 (5–4 p)	Olympique St Genis-Laval (7)
9.	FC Roche-St Genest (7)	0–2	FC Lyon (7)
10.	Grenoble Foot 38 (4)	10–0	US Millery-Vourles (8)
11.	FC Corbas (10)	0–4	Chassieu Décines FC (7)
12.	US Replonges (10)	0–3	UF Belleville St Jean-d'Ardières (7)
13.	Marignier Sports (9)	4–1	ES Fillinges (10)
14.	AS Misérieux-Trévoux (7)	4–1	FC Veyle Sâone (7)
15.	Valence FC (8)	2–1	Feyzin Club Belle Étoile (8)
16.	Olympique Villefontaine (13)	2–0	Isle d'Abeau FC (10)
17.	FC Haute Tarentaise (9)	0–1	FC Chéran (8)
18.	FO Bourg (10)	1–3	Annecy FC (4)
19.	US Grand Colombier (9)	2–2 (4–3 p)	ES Tarentaise (8)
20.	FC Belle Étoile Mercury (10)	0–2	Monts d'Or Azergues Foot (4)
21.	ES Cernex (10)	1–2	ES Amancy (8)
22.	US Pont-de-Vaux-Arbigny (10)	2–2 (2–4 p)	ES Seynod (9)
23.	FC Cruseilles (7)	1–0	Ain Sud Foot (6)
24.	Ville-la-Grand FC (10)	2–0	Haut Giffre FC (11)
25.	Concordia FC Bellegarde (10)	2–3	Nivolet FC (8)
26.	US Annecy-le-Vieux (8)	2–0	US Mont Blanc (9)
27.	CS Amphion Publier (7)	1–3	JS Chambéry (8)
28.	CO St Fons (9)	0–5	ASF Andrézieux (4)
29.	Sud Azergues Foot (9)	3–1	FC Commelle-Vernay (9)
30.	FC Pontcharra-St Loup (9)	0–1	Roannais Foot 42 (7)
31.	CA Maurienne (10)	0–2	US Metare St Étienne Sud-Est (8)
32.	Bellegarde Sports (11)	1–2 (a.e.t.)	ES Manival (8)
33.	US Sud Forézienne (10)	1–4 (a.e.t.)	Caluire SC (7)
34.	Ménival FC (10)	0–2	FC Rhône Vallées (6)
35.	JS Cellieu (11)	2–3	Chambéry Savoie Football (6)
36.	AS St Cyr-les-Vignes (11)	0–6	Côte Chaude Sportif (6)
37.	AS Montchat Lyon (8)	4–3	UGA Lyon-Décines (7)
38.	AS Italienne Européenne Grenoble (10)	0–1	L'Étrat-La Tour Sportif (8)
39.	ES Sorbiers (10)	0–4	ES Veauche (8)
40.	US Villars (8)	0–3	FC Villefranche (4)
41.	FC Crolles-Bernin (10)	2–5	AS Savigneux-Montbrison (8)
42.	FC Roanne Clermont (9)	0–1	FC Rive Droite (10)
43.	ES Rachais (8)	0–1	Hauts Lyonnais (6)
44.	SC Romans (10)	0–2	Olympique Ruomsois (8)
45.	SC Bourguesan (12)	0–5	FC Vaulx-en-Velin (6)
46.	AS Dolon (11)	0–6	FC La Tour-St Clair (6)
47.	FC Bourg-lès-Valence (10)	2–4	Olympique St Marcellin (7)
48.	Football Côte St André (8)	1–1 (4–5 p)	Sud Lyonnais Foot (8)
49.	AS Véore Montoison (8)	0–1	FC Val Lyonnais (8)
50.	MOS Trois Rivières (7)	2–5	UMS Montélimar (6)
51.	CO Châteauneuvois (10)	2–3	FC Péageois (8)
52.	FC Eyrieux Embroye (9)	1–0	Entente Crest-Aouste (9)
53.	AS Valensolles (11)	1–7	FC Échirolles (6)
54.	Football Mont-Pilat (9)	0–3	AL St Maurice-l'Exil (9)
55.	AS Villefontaine (11)	1–3	FC Bords de Saône (7)

== Fifth round ==
=== French Guiana ===
These matches were played on 15 and 16 October 2016.

Fifth round results: French Guiana

Tie no	Home team (tier)	Score	Away team (tier)
1.	(French Guiana) Le Geldar De Kourou (DH)	1–0	ASC Agouado (DH) (French Guiana)
2.	(French Guiana) FC Oyapock (PH)	0–0 (3–4 p)	US Matoury (DH) (French Guiana)
3.	(French Guiana) CSC Cayenne (DH)	1–2	ASC Kawina (non) (French Guiana)
4.	(French Guiana) SC Kouroucien (DH)	4–3 (a.e.t.)	ASU Grand Santi (DH) (French Guiana)

Note: French Guiana League Structure (no promotion to French League Structure):
Division d'Honneur (DH)
Promotion d'Honneur (PH)

=== Guadeloupe ===
These matches were played on 8 October 2016.

Fifth round results: Guadeloupe

Tie no	Home team (tier)	Score	Away team (tier)
1.	(Guadeloupe) US Ste Rose (DH)	2–1	RC de Basse-Terre (PHR) (Guadeloupe)
2.	(Guadeloupe) CS Capesterre Belle Eau (DH)	2–4	CS Moulien (DH) (Guadeloupe)
3.	(Guadeloupe) Unar (PHR)	0–2	USBM (DH) (Guadeloupe)
4.	(Guadeloupe) Phare du Canal (DH)	3–1	Cactus Ste Anne (PHR) (Guadeloupe)

Note: Guadeloupe League Structure (no promotion to French League Structure):
Division d'Honneur (DH)
Promotion d'Honneur Régionale (PHR)
Promotion d'Honneur (PH)
Première Division (PD)

=== Martinique ===
These matches were played on 27 September and 8 October 2016.

Fifth round results: Martinique

Tie no	Home team (tier)	Score	Away team (tier)
1.	(Martinique) Club Franciscain (LR1)	3–0	RC Rivière-Pilote (LR1) (Martinique)
2.	(Martinique) New Star (LR1)	2–0	Eclair (LR2) (Martinique)
3.	(Martinique) Golden Lion FC (LR1)	5–1	US Diamantinoise (LR1) (Martinique)
4.	(Martinique) Golden Star (LR1)	1–2 (a.e.t.)	Club Colonial (LR1) (Martinique)

Note: Martinique League Structure (no promotion to French League Structure):
Ligue Régionale 1 (LR1)
Ligue Régionale 2 (LR2)
Ligue Régionale 3 (LR3)

=== Mayotte ===
These matches were played on 10 September 2016

Fifth round results: Mayotte

Tie no	Home team (tier)	Score	Away team (tier)
1.	(Mayotte) ASC Abeilles (DH)	1–1 (a.e.t.) (4–5 p)	FC Mtsapéré (DH) (Mayotte)
2.	(Mayotte) UCS Sada (DHT)	0–0 (a.e.t.) (6–7 p)	FC Labattoir (DHT) (Mayotte)

Note: Mayotte League Structure (no promotion to French League Structure):
Division d'Honneur (DH)
Division d'Honneur Territoriale (DHT)
Promotion d'Honneur (PH)

=== Réunion ===
These matches were played on 8 and 9 October 2016.

Fifth round results: Réunion

Tie no	Home team (tier)	Score	Away team (tier)
1.	(Réunion) AS Excelsior (D1R)	1–1 (4–2 p)	AS Saint-Suzanne (D1R) (Réunion)
2.	(Réunion) JS Saint-Pierroise (D1R)	7–0	ASC Grands Bois (D2R) (Réunion)

Note: Reúnion League Structure (no promotion to French League Structure):
Division 1 Régionale (D1R)
Division 2 Régionale (D2R)
Division 2 Départementale (D2D)
Division 3 Départementale (D3D)

=== Bourgogne ===
These matches were played on 8 and 9 October 2016.

Fifth round results: Bourgogne

Tie no	Home team (tier)	Score	Away team (tier)
1.	AS Châtenoy-le-Royal (8)	1–1 (3–5 p)	FC Gueugnon (5)
2.	US Cheminots Paray (7)	0–1	CS Louhans-Cuiseaux (5)
3.	AS Clamecy (7)	0–3	SC Selongey (5)
4.	SC Mâcon (10)	1–3	FC Montceau (4)
5.	US St Sernin-du-Bois (6)	2–0	ALC Longvic (7)
6.	Digoin FCA (8)	4–0	AS Genlis (8)
7.	UF Mâconnais (6)	1–0	FC Sens (6)
8.	Paron FC (6)	1–1 (5–6 p)	AS Quetigny (6)

=== Auvergne ===
These matches were played on 8 and 9 October 2016.

Fifth round results: Auvergne

Tie no	Home team (tier)	Score	Away team (tier)
1.	CS Bessay (9)	0–8	AS Yzeure (4)
2.	CS Volvic (6)	2–1	Montluçon Football (6)
3.	FC Cournon (5)	3–2	Ass. Vergongheon-Arvant (7)
4.	Ytrac Foot (6)	2–0	Sporting Chataigneraie Cantal (7)
5.	FC Riom (7)	1–1 (5–4 p)	Sauveteurs Brivois (11)
6.	AA Lapalisse (7)	0–3 (Note: Match abandoned due to floodlight failure. Score 2–5 at time of abandonment. Outcome at discretion of FFF.)	SA Thiers (6)
7.	AS Moulins (7)	1–0	AS Cheminots St Germain (10)
8.	Entente Nord Lozere (6)	0–3	Le Puy Foot (4)
9.	FA Le Cendre (8)	1–0	RC Vichy (6)
10.	AS Emblavez-Vorey (8)	2–1	US Mozac (9)

=== Lower Normandy ===
These matches were played on 8 and 9 October 2016.

Fifth round results: Lower Normandy

Tie no	Home team (tier)	Score	Away team (tier)
1.	USON Mondeville (6)	3–1	FC Flers (6)
2.	AF Virois (6)	1–3	US Granville (4)
3.	US Alençon (6)	3–2 (a.e.t.)	Agneaux FC (7)
4.	ES Coutances (6)	0–1	SU Dives-Cabourg (5)
5.	LC Bretteville-sur-Odon (7)	2–0 (a.e.t.) (Note: Result subject to review. LC Bretteville-sur-Odon reported to have fielded ineligible players.)	FC Équeurdreville-Hainneville (8)
6.	JS Douvres (7)	3–3 (1–2 p)	ASPTT Caen (6)
7.	US Ouest Cotentin (8)	1–8	US Avranches (3)
8.	AS Cherbourg (7)	0–2	AS Trouville-Deauville (6)

=== Centre-Val de Loire ===
These matches were played on 7, 8 and 9 October 2016.

Fifth round results: Centre-Val de Loire

Tie no	Home team (tier)	Score	Away team (tier)
1.	LB Châteauroux (3)	2–1	FC Chartres (4)
2.	FC Drouais (5)	2–3	Avoine OCC (5)
3.	FC Ouest Tournageau (6)	1–1 (0–3 p)	SO Romorantin (4)
4.	AS Contres (8)	1–2	Saint-Pryvé Saint-Hilaire FC (5)
5.	Blois Foot 41 (5)	3–0	USM Saran (6)
6.	Bourges Foot (6)	4–0	FC St Georges-sur-Eure (7)
7.	AS Chouzy-Onzain (8)	0–4	Bourges 18 (5)
8.	Chartres Horizon (6)	1–0	J3S Amilly (7)

=== Centre-West ===
These matches were played on 8 and 9 October 2016.

Fifth round results: Centre-West

Tie no	Home team (tier)	Score	Away team (tier)
1.	US Usson-du-Poitou (12)	0–4	OL St Liguaire Niort (6)
2.	CA St Savin-St Germain (8)	1–0	FC Bressuire (5)
3.	CA Neuville (7)	1–4 (a.e.t.)	Limoges FC (5)
4.	Stade Ruffec (9)	1–0	ES Saintes (7)
5.	FC Sévigné Jonzac-St Germain (11)	0–3	UA Niort St Florent (8)
6.	ES La Rochelle (6)	1–0	US Chauvigny (6)
7.	AS Montguyon (10)	0–3	Angoulême CFC (5)
8.	Thouars Foot 79 (6)	0–0 (1–2 p)	AS Cozes (5)
9.	FC Pays Argentonnais (10)	1–1 (1–3 p)	ES Aiglons Briviste (7)
10.	AS Échiré St Gelais (6)	0–1	AS St Pantaleon (7)
11.	SA Moncoutant (9)	2–6	Poitiers FC (6)
12.	AS Panazol (10)	1–1 (7–8 p)	AS Aixois (7)

=== Corsica ===
These matches were played on 9 October 2016.

Fifth round results: Corsica

Tie no	Home team (tier)	Score	Away team (tier)
1.	AS Furiani-Agliani (5)	2–0	FB Île-Rousse (5)
2.	SC Bocognano Gravona (6)	1–2 (a.e.t.)	CA Bastia (3)
3.	Borgo FC (5)	1–0	USC Corte (6)
4.	AS Casinca (6)	1–2	Gallia Club Lucciana (6)

=== Franche-Comté ===
These matches were played on 8 and 9 October 2016.

Fifth round results: Franche-Comté

Tie no	Home team (tier)	Score	Away team (tier)
1.	Jura Sud Foot (4)	2–3 (a.e.t.)	Besançon FC (5)
2.	AS Levier (6)	0–5	CA Pontarlier (5)
3.	AS Audincourt (8)	1–3	Jura Dolois Foot (6)
4.	FC Grandvillars (6)	0–3	ASM Belfort (3)
5.	US Les Écorces (8)	2–4 (a.e.t.)	FC Champagnole (6)
6.	FC Valdahon-Vercel (7)	2–0	AS Château de Joux (8)

=== Languedoc-Roussillon ===
These matches were played on 9 October 2016.

Fifth round results: Languedoc-Roussillon

Tie no	Home team (tier)	Score	Away team (tier)
1.	Canet Roussillon FC (6)	0–1	GC Uchaud (7)
2.	FC Bagnols Pont (6)	0–1	AF Lozère (5)
3.	La Clermontaise Football (7)	1–1 (0–3 p)	ES Paulhan-Pézenas (4)
4.	AS Fabrègues (5)	2–3	CE Palavas (6)
5.	Castelnau Le Crès FC (6)	0–1	Marvejols Sports (7)
6.	AS St Privat-des-Vieux (8)	1–3	Olympique Alès (5)
7.	FC Chusclan-Laudun-l'Ardoise (8)	2–4	Entente St Clément-Montferrier (6)
8.	AS Badaroux (9)	5–2	US Conques (7)
9.	Stade Beaucairois (7)	1–4	AS Frontignan AC (6)
10.	Pointe Courte AC Sète (9)	1–6	AS Béziers (3)

=== Maine ===
These matches were played on 8 and 9 October 2016.

Fifth round results: Maine

Tie no	Home team (tier)	Score	Away team (tier)
1.	Le Mans FC (5)	7–0	SA Mamertins (6)
2.	AS Le Mans Villaret (7)	1–3	ES Bonchamp (6)
3.	US Bazouges-Cré (7)	2–5	US Changé (5)
4.	Ernéenne Foot (8)	1–1 (4–2 p)	RC Fléchois (5)
5.	Beaumont SA (9)	0–2	La Suze FC (6)
6.	CO St Saturnin Arche (6)	1–1 (4–3 p)	Sablé FC (5)

=== Midi-Pyrénées ===
These matches were played on 8 and 9 October 2016.

Fifth round results: Midi-Pyrénées

Tie no	Home team (tier)	Score	Away team (tier)
1.	AS Muretaine (6)	1–2	Luzenac AP (6)
2.	Onet-le-Château (6)	0–2	Tarbes Pyrénées Football (4)
3.	Blagnac FC (6)	3–0	US Cazères (7)
4.	Auch Football (6)	0–2	US Colomiers (4)
5.	SO Millau (9)	2–4	Balma SC (5)
6.	Beaupuy-Montrabé-St Jean FC (7)	0–6	Toulouse Rodéo FC (5)
7.	FC Pavien (9)	0–1	Luc Primaube FC (6)
8.	St Orens FC (8)	1–0	SC Sébazac (9)
9.	Figeac Quercy (9)	2–1	AS Bressols (9)
10.	Rodez AF (4)	3–3 (5–4 p)	US Castanéenne (5)
11.	Toulouse ACF (8)	2–2 (6–5 p)	ERCSO L'Isle-en-Dodon (8)
12.	SC Lafrancaisain (9)	2–0	AS Fleurance-La Sauvetat (7)

=== Aquitaine ===
These matches were played on 8 and 9 October 2016.

Fifth round results: Aquitaine

Tie no	Home team (tier)	Score	Away team (tier)
1.	Hasparren FC (9)	0–3	Genêts Anglet (5)
2.	Stade Bordelais ASPTT (5)	1–1 (2–4 p)	Pau FC (3)
3.	US Lège Cap Ferret (5)	1–4	FCE Mérignac Arlac (6)
4.	SA Mauléonais (9)	1–2	Hiriburuko Ainhara (8)
5.	AS Taillan (9)	0–3	SA Mérignac (6)
6.	La Brède FC (7)	0–2 (a.e.t.)	SAG Cestas (6)
7.	FC Lescar (8)	0–2	JA Biarritz (6)
8.	FC Doazit (9)	3–1	FC des Graves (7)
9.	US Mussidan-St Medard (9)	1–4	FC Bassin d'Arcachon (6)
10.	Langon FC (6)	0–3	Stade Montois (4)
11.	US Alliance Talençaise (8)	1–3	Bergerac Périgord FC (4)
12.	AS Gensac-Montcaret (9)	0–3	Trélissac FC (4)

=== Atlantique ===
These matches were played on 8 and 9 October 2016.

Fifth round results: Atlantique

Tie no	Home team (tier)	Score	Away team (tier)
1.	GS St Sébastien (7)	0–9	Les Herbiers VF (3)
2.	AS Ponts-de-Cé (10)	0–3	La Roche VF (5)
3.	Vendée Fontenay Foot (4)	1–2	Voltigeurs de Châteaubriant (4)
4.	Stade Olonnais (9)	1–3	Poiré-sur-Vie VF (6)
5.	SA St Florent-des-Bois (11)	0–1	SC Beaucouzé (6)
6.	FE Trélazé (7)	1–2	USSA Vertou (5)
7.	Etoile de Clisson (9)	0–3	TVEC Les Sables-d'Olonne (6)
8.	FC Fief Gesté (11)	1–2	FC Challans (6)
9.	US Varades (10)	2–2 (2–4 p)	Orvault SF (6)
10.	US Philbertine Football (7)	1–0	ASI Mûrs-Erigné (8)
11.	St Aubin-Guérande Football (7)	1–0	Mareuil SC (8)
12.	ES Dresny-Plessé (10)	0–10	SO Cholet (4)
13.	AC Pouzauges-Réaumur (7)	1–0	Élan de Gorges Foot (8)
14.	FC Guémené-Massérac (12)	1–4	AS La Châtaigneraie (7)
15.	St Pierre de Retz (8)	1–3	Olympique Saumur FC (6)
16.	AS Sud Loire (9)	2–4	FC Rezé (6)

=== Méditerranée ===
These matches were played on 8 and 9 October 2016.

Fifth round results: Méditerranée

Tie no	Home team (tier)	Score	Away team (tier)
1.	Hyères FC (4)	1–0	ES Cannet-Rocheville (5)
2.	FSC La Ciotat (9)	1–3	FC Istres (7)
3.	US Le Pontet (4)	0–2	Étoile Fréjus Saint-Raphaël (4)
4.	SC Jonquières (9)	2–4	Marignane-Gignac FC (4)
5.	US Plan de Grasse (8)	2–3	GS Consolat (3)
6.	US Marseille Endoume (6)	2–1	FC Martigues (4)
7.	US Mandelieu-La Napoule (7)	1–2	FC Rousset Ste Victoire (7)
8.	FA Val Durance (7)	0–3	Aubagne FC (5)
9.	AS Estérel (8)	0–6	RC Grasse (5)
10.	Espérance Pernoise (6)	3–2	Berre SC (7)

=== Normandie ===
These matches were played on 8 and 9 October 2016.

Fifth round results: Normandie

Tie no	Home team (tier)	Score	Away team (tier)
1.	Évreux FC (5)	1–2	US Quevilly-Rouen (3)
2.	CMS Oissel (5)	3–0	ESM Gonfreville (6)
3.	AL Déville-Maromme (6)	7–0	US Gasny (6)
4.	AS Montivilliers (9)	0–3	Olympique Pavillais (7)
5.	US Lillebonne (8)	3–3 (4–3 p)	Eu FC (6)
6.	RC Caudebecais (8)	1–0	USF Fécamp (7)
7.	JS St Nicolas-d'Aliermont (7)	2–1	CO Cléon (8)
8.	Grand-Quevilly FC (6)	3–0	Pacy Ménilles RC (6)

=== Rhône-Alpes ===
These matches were played on 8 and 9 October 2016.

Fifth round results: Rhône-Alpes

Tie no	Home team (tier)	Score	Away team (tier)
1.	Caluire SC (7)	1–5	ASF Andrézieux (4)
2.	Chambéry Savoie Football (6)	2–3	FC Bords de Saône (7)
3.	AL St Maurice-l'Exil (9)	1–3	AS Lyon-Duchère (3)
4.	FC Échirolles (6)	1–0	FC Lyon (7)
5.	Annecy FC (4)	2–3 (a.e.t.)	Grenoble Foot 38 (4)
6.	L'Étrat-La Tour Sportif (8)	2–1	FC Péageois (8)
7.	Valence FC (8)	1–0	FC Limonest Saint-Didier (5)
8.	Olympique Ruomsois (8)	0–1	Olympique Belleroche Villefranche (9)
9.	Sud Lyonnais Foot (8)	0–2	Hauts Lyonnais (6)
10.	ES Veauche (8)	0–3	Côte Chaude Sportif (6)
11.	Roannais Foot 42 (7)	1–4	UMS Montélimar (6)
12.	Domtac FC (7)	0–1 (a.e.t.)	AS Saint-Priest (5)
13.	FC Val Lyonnais (8)	0–1	Sud Azergues Foot (9)
14.	FC Eyrieux Embroye (9)	0–4	FC Vaulx-en-Velin (6)
15.	US Metare St Étienne Sud-Est (8)	1–2	Monts d'Or Azergues Foot (4)
16.	Olympique Villefontaine (13)	1–4	UF Belleville St Jean-d'Ardières (7)
17.	AS Savigneux-Montbrison (8)	4–3	US Grand Colombier (9)
18.	ES Amancy (8)	1–3	ES Manival (8)
19.	Olympique St Marcellin (7)	1–0 (a.e.t.)	FC Villefranche (4)
20.	ES Seynod (9)	0–2	Aix-les-Bains FC (6)
21.	JS Chambéry (8)	1–2	FC Rhône Vallées (6)
22.	FC La Tour-St Clair (6)	0–1	FC Bourgoin-Jallieu (5)
23.	FC Rive Droite (10)	1–0 (a.e.t.) (Note: FC Rive Droite penalised for fielding an ineligible player. Marignier Sports qualify for the sixth round.)	Marignier Sports (9)
24.	Ville-la-Grand FC (10)	1–0	FC Chéran (8)
25.	Nivolet FC (8)	1–0	Chassieu Décines FC (7)
26.	ES Vallières (7)	0–2	AS Misérieux-Trévoux (7)
27.	US Annecy-le-Vieux (8)	0–1	FC Cruseilles (7)
28.	AS Montchat Lyon (8)	1–5	Cluses-Scionzier FC (6)

== Sixth round ==
=== French Guiana ===
These matches were played on 20 and 21 October 2016.

Tie no	Home team (tier)	Score	Away team (tier)
1.	(French Guiana) US Matoury (DH)	2–0	SC Kouroucien (DH) (French Guiana)
2.	(French Guiana) ASC Kawina (non)	1–2	Le Geldar De Kourou (DH) (French Guiana)

=== Guadeloupe ===
These matches were played on 21 and 22 October 2016.

Tie no	Home team (tier)	Score	Away team (tier)
1.	(Guadeloupe) CS Moulien (DH)	3–1 (a.e.t.)	US Ste Rose (DH) (Guadeloupe)
2.	(Guadeloupe) Phare du Canal (DH)	1–0	USBM (DH) (Guadeloupe)

=== Martinique ===
These matches were played on 18 and 19 October 2016.

Tie no	Home team (tier)	Score	Away team (tier)
1.	(Martinique) Club Franciscain (LR1)	4–1	New Star (LR1) (Martinique)
2.	(Martinique) Club Colonial (LR1)	0–2	Golden Lion FC (LR1) (Martinique)

=== Mayotte ===
This match was played on 16 October 2016.

Tie no	Home team (tier)	Score	Away team (tier)
1.	(Mayotte) FC Labattoir (DHT)	0–3	FC Mtsapéré (DH) (Mayotte)

=== Réunion ===
This match was played on 23 October 2016. Both teams qualified for the 7th round.

Tie no	Home team (tier)	Score	Away team (tier)
1.	(Réunion) AS Excelsior (D1R)	0–1	JS Saint-Pierroise (D1R) (Réunion)

=== Alsace ===
These matches were played on 22 and 23 October 2016.

Tie no	Home team (tier)	Score	Away team (tier)
1.	US Reipertswiller (6)	2–3	FC Soleil Bischheim (6)
2.	FC Illhaeusern (7)	0–1	FC Mulhouse (4)
3.	FC Bartenheim (8)	2–4 (a.e.t.)	US Sarre-Union (5)
4.	ASC Biesheim (5)	0–2 (a.e.t.)	FC Kronenbourg Strasbourg (6)
5.	FC Dahlenheim (10)	2–1	AS Illzach Modenheim (5)
6.	SR Kaysersberg (9)	4–2	FC Sierentz (7)
7.	AS Menora Strasbourg (8)	0–1 (a.e.t.)	FCSR Haguenau (5)
8.	FC Soultz-sous-Forêts/Kutzenhausen (8)	0–1	US Oberlauterbach (6)
9.	ASCA Wittelsheim (8)	1–4	AS Erstein (6)

=== Aquitaine ===
These matches were played on 22 and 23 October 2016.

Tie no	Home team (tier)	Score	Away team (tier)
1.	Pau FC (3)	3–2	Trélissac FC (4)
2.	SA Mérignac (6)	1–3	FC Bassin d'Arcachon (6)
3.	JA Biarritz (6)	5–2	FCE Mérignac Arlac (6)
4.	SAG Cestas (6)	2–4	Stade Montois (4)
5.	Hiriburuko Ainhara (8)	0–1	Genêts Anglet (5)
6.	FC Doazit (9)	2–3 (a.e.t.)	Bergerac Périgord FC (4)

=== Atlantique ===
These matches were played on 22 and 23 October 2016.

Tie no	Home team (tier)	Score	Away team (tier)
1.	TVEC Les Sables-d'Olonne (6)	2–0	US Philbertine Football (7)
2.	St Aubin-Guérande Football (7)	0–5	USSA Vertou (5)
3.	Poiré-sur-Vie VF (6)	3–1	Voltigeurs de Châteaubriant (4)
4.	AS La Châtaigneraie (7)	0–3	FC Challans (6)
5.	Orvault SF (6)	0–5	SO Cholet (4)
6.	FC Rezé (6)	0–2	Les Herbiers VF (3)
7.	Olympique Saumur FC (6)	3–1	La Roche VF (5)
8.	SC Beaucouzé (6)	1–1 (3–5 p)	AC Pouzauges-Réaumur (7)

=== Auvergne ===
These matches were played on 22 and 23 October 2016.

Tie no	Home team (tier)	Score	Away team (tier)
1.	AS Emblavez-Vorey (8)	1–3 (a.e.t.)	Ytrac Foot (6)
2.	FC Riom (7)	0–4	AS Yzeure (4)
3.	SA Thiers (6)	1–1 (5–4 p)	Le Puy Foot (4)
4.	CS Volvic (6)	2–1	FC Cournon (5)
5.	FA Le Cendre (8)	3–1	AS Moulins (7)

=== Lower Normandy ===
These matches were played on 22 October 2016.

Tie no	Home team (tier)	Score	Away team (tier)
1.	USON Mondeville (6)	0–2 (a.e.t.)	US Alençon (6)
2.	FC Équeurdreville-Hainneville (8)	0–5	SU Dives-Cabourg (5)
3.	ASPTT Caen (6)	1–3	US Avranches (3)
4.	AS Trouville-Deauville (6)	1–4	US Granville (4)

=== Bretagne ===
These matches were played on 22 and 23 October 2016.

Tie no	Home team (tier)	Score	Away team (tier)
1.	AS Plouvien (10)	1–3	Vannes OC (5)
2.	FC Guichen (6)	0–2	AS Vitré (4)
3.	Lamballe FC (7)	0–1	Stade Briochin (5)
4.	La Plancoëtine (8)	1–3 (a.e.t.)	Plouzané AC (6)
5.	FC Quimperlois (7)	2–2 (3–4 p)	Ploufragan FC (7)
6.	US Montagnarde (6)	3–2	Lannion FC (5)
7.	US Concarneau (3)	4–2	US Saint-Malo (4)
8.	Saint-Colomban Sportive Locminé (6)	1–0	Paotred Dispount (6)
9.	US Liffré (9)	0–4	Stade Pontivyen (7)
10.	Guipavas GdR (7)	3–1	US Trégunc (7)
11.	ASPTT Brest (10)	1–0	ES Thorigné-Fouillard (10)
12.	SC Le Rheu (8)	2–4	TA Rennes (5)
13.	US Fouesnant (8)	1–5	GSI Pontivy (6)
14.	FC Breteil-Talensac (9)	0–1	RC Rannée-La Guerche-Drouges (7)

=== Bourgogne ===
These matches were played on 22 and 23 October 2016.

Tie no	Home team (tier)	Score	Away team (tier)
1.	FC Gueugnon (5)	2–2 (4–5 p)	CS Louhans-Cuiseaux (5)
2.	SC Selongey (5)	1–0	FC Montceau (4)
3.	AS Quetigny (6)	0–1	US St Sernin-du-Bois (6)
4.	Digoin FCA (8)	0–0 (4–5 p)	UF Mâconnais (6)

=== Centre-Val de Loire ===
These matches were played on 22 and 23 October 2016.

Tie no	Home team (tier)	Score	Away team (tier)
1.	SO Romorantin (4)	1–0	Bourges 18 (5)
2.	Saint-Pryvé Saint-Hilaire FC (5)	0–2	Blois Foot 41 (5)
3.	Avoine OCC (5)	2–0	Bourges Foot (6)
4.	Chartres Horizon (6)	0–4	LB Châteauroux (3)

=== Centre-West ===
These matches were played on 22 and 23 October 2016.

Tie no	Home team (tier)	Score	Away team (tier)
1.	OL St Liguaire Niort (6)	7–1	ES Aiglons Briviste (7)
2.	UA Niort St Florent (8)	5–4	ES La Rochelle (6)
3.	CA St Savin-St Germain (8)	2–9	Limoges FC (5)
4.	Poitiers FC (6)	4–0	Angoulême CFC (5)
5.	Stade Ruffec (9)	0–3	AS Aixois (7)
6.	AS St Pantaleon (7)	1–0	AS Cozes (5)

=== Champagne-Ardenne ===
These matches were played on 22 and 23 October 2016.

Tie no	Home team (tier)	Score	Away team (tier)
1.	AS Prix-lès-Mézières (5)	1–0	RC Épernay Champagne (6)
2.	Chaumont FC (6)	2–1	FC St Mesmin (6)
3.	SA Sézanne (6)	5–1	Foyer Barsequannais (6)
4.	SC Tinqueux (7)	0–3	CS Sedan Ardennes (3)

=== Corsica ===
These matches were played on 23 October 2016.

Tie no	Home team (tier)	Score	Away team (tier)
1.	Borgo FC (5)	1–0	AS Furiani-Agliani (5)
2.	Gallia Club Lucciana (6)	1–1 (2–4 p)	CA Bastia (3)

=== Franche-Comté ===
These matches were played on 22 and 23 October 2016.

Tie no	Home team (tier)	Score	Away team (tier)
1.	FC Champagnole (6)	0–2	ASM Belfort (3)
2.	Jura Dolois Foot (6)	1–2 (a.e.t.)	CA Pontarlier (5)
3.	FC Valdahon-Vercel (7)	0–2	Besançon FC (5)

=== Languedoc-Roussillon ===
These matches were played on 22 and 23 October 2016.

Tie no	Home team (tier)	Score	Away team (tier)
1.	AF Lozère (5)	0–2	Olympique Alès (5)
2.	GC Uchaud (7)	2–2 (3–4 p)	AS Béziers (3)
3.	Entente St Clément-Montferrier (6)	0–4	ES Paulhan-Pézenas (4)
4.	AS Frontignan AC (6)	3–2	Marvejols Sports (7)
5.	AS Badaroux (9)	1–4	CE Palavas (6)

=== Lorraine ===
These matches were played on 22 and 23 October 2016.

Tie no	Home team (tier)	Score	Away team (tier)
1.	SAS Épinal (3)	2–1	US Raon-l'Étape (4)
2.	FC Sarrebourg (7)	1–0	US Pagny-sur-Moselle (5)
3.	Entente Centre Ornain (9)	1–0	US Behren-lès-Forbach (8)
4.	ES Fameck (7)	0–3	Sarreguemines FC (5)
5.	COS Villers (7)	0–2	CS Homécourt (8)
6.	SR Creutzwald 03 (8)	1–2	Jarville JF (6)
7.	EF Turque Sarrebourg (8)	0–2	FC Lunéville (5)
8.	FC Mondelange (9)	0–3	APM Metz (6)

=== Maine ===
These matches were played on 22 and 23 October 2016.

Tie no	Home team (tier)	Score	Away team (tier)
1.	US Changé (5)	0–5	Le Mans FC (5)
2.	La Suze FC (6)	0–1	ES Bonchamp (6)
3.	Ernéenne Foot (8)	3–2	CO St Saturnin Arche (6)

=== Méditerranée ===
These matches were played on 22 and 23 October 2016.

Tie no	Home team (tier)	Score	Away team (tier)
1.	US Marseille Endoume (6)	1–2	GS Consolat (3)
2.	Aubagne FC (5)	0–3	Hyères FC (4)
3.	FC Istres (7)	2–1	RC Grasse (5)
4.	Étoile Fréjus Saint-Raphaël (4)	3–0	Marignane-Gignac FC (4)
5.	FC Rousset Ste Victoire (7)	2–1	Espérance Pernoise (6)

=== Midi-Pyrénées ===
These matches were played on 22 and 23 October 2016.

Tie no	Home team (tier)	Score	Away team (tier)
1.	Blagnac FC (6)	1–0 (a.e.t.)	US Colomiers (4)
2.	Luzenac AP (6)	0–1	Tarbes Pyrénées Football (4)
3.	St Orens FC (8)	0–1	Balma SC (5)
4.	Figeac Quercy (9)	1–4	Rodez AF (4)
5.	SC Lafrancaisain (9)	0–2	Toulouse Rodéo FC (5)
6.	Toulouse ACF (8)	0–4	Luc Primaube FC (6)

=== Nord-Pas de Calais ===
These matches were played on 22 and 23 October 2016.

Tie no	Home team (tier)	Score	Away team (tier)
1.	AS Étaples (8)	2–1	Olympique Grande-Synthe (5)
2.	CS Avion (7)	1–0	Calais RUFC (4)
3.	US Maubeuge (5)	2–0	SC Hazebrouck (6)
4.	Recques FC (11)	0–1	Villeneuve-d'Ascq Métropole (7)
5.	AC Cambrai (7)	2–2 (4–5 p)	IC Croix (4)
6.	St Amand FC (6)	1–0	ES Bully-les-Mines (7)
7.	OS Annequin (12)	0–3	US Saint-Omer (6)
8.	US Noyelles-sous-Lens (10)	0–0 (3–4 p)	AS Steenvorde (10)
9.	Stade Portelois (6)	1–1 (3–1 p)	Stade Béthunois (6)
10.	AS Berck (9)	1–4	Olympique Marcquois (7)
11.	US St Maurice Loos-en-Gohelle (8)	0–1	US Boulogne (3)
12.	US Vimy (6)	1–6	ES Wasquehal (4)
13.	Leers OF (9)	1–3	Feignies Aulnoye FC (5)

=== Normandie ===
These matches were played on 23 October 2016.

Tie no	Home team (tier)	Score	Away team (tier)
1.	Olympique Pavillais (7)	2–1	US Lillebonne (8)
2.	Grand-Quevilly FC (6)	2–1 (a.e.t.)	CMS Oissel (5)
3.	AL Déville-Maromme (6)	0–6	US Quevilly-Rouen (3)
4.	JS St Nicolas-d'Aliermont	void (Note: Match abandoned after 115 minutes with the scoreline 2–1. Both clubs were subsequently removed from the competition.)	RC Caudebecais (8)

=== Paris-Île-de-France ===
These matches were played on 22 and 23 October 2016.

Tie no	Home team (tier)	Score	Away team (tier)
1.	ES Viry-Châtillon (4)	2–0	FC Mantes (4)
2.	Blanc Mesnil SF (6)	2–1	FC Versailles 78 (6)
3.	Claye-Souilly SF (9)	2–1	OFC Les Mureaux (6)
4.	AF Bobigny (6)	2–0	AS Poissy (4)
5.	JA Drancy (4)	2–1	US Créteil-Lusitanos (3)
6.	Noisy-le-Grand FC (8)	0–1 (a.e.t.)	US Sénart-Moissy (5)
7.	JS Suresnes (9)	0–1	Le Mée Sports (6)
8.	FC Fleury 91 (4)	2–0	Paris FC (3)
9.	ES Parisienne (9)	1–0	Saint-Brice FC (7)
10.	Champigny FC 94 (7)	3–1 (a.e.t.)	FCM Aubervilliers (5)
11.	CA Vitry (9)	0–1	Sainte-Geneviève Sports (5)

=== Picardie ===
These matches were played on 22 and 23 October 2016.

Tie no	Home team (tier)	Score	Away team (tier)
1.	ICS Créçois (7)	0–2	US Roye-Noyon (5)
2.	Olympique Saint-Quentin (5)	0–3	FC Chambly (3)
3.	USM Senlisienne (5)	0–3	AS Beauvais Oise (5)
4.	US Guignicourt (7)	1–2	US Chauny (7)
5.	US St Maximin (7)	4–3	US Chantilly (6)
6.	Stade Ressontois (9)	0–4	AFC Compiègne (6)
7.	USE St Leu d'Esserent (8)	1–5	ESC Longueau (7)

=== Rhône-Alpes ===
These matches were played on 22 and 23 October 2016.

Tie no	Home team (tier)	Score	Away team (tier)
1.	Aix-les-Bains FC (6)	1–2	Grenoble Foot 38 (4)
2.	FC Bords de Saône (7)	1–0	FC Échirolles (6)
3.	AS Saint-Priest (5)	1–0	UMS Montélimar (6)
4.	Olympique Belleroche Villefranche (9)	0–1 (a.e.t.)	Côte Chaude Sportif (6)
5.	FC Vaulx-en-Velin (6)	1–0	Monts d'Or Azergues Foot (4)
6.	Valence FC (8)	1–2 (a.e.t.)	ASF Andrézieux (4)
7.	Marignier Sports (9)	0–3	Cluses-Scionzier FC (6)
8.	AS Misérieux-Trévoux (7)	1–0	FC Bourgoin-Jallieu (5)
9.	Sud Azergues Foot (9)	0–3	Olympique St Marcellin (7)
10.	UF Belleville St Jean-d'Ardières (7)	4–0	L'Étrat-La Tour Sportif (8)
11.	Nivolet FC (8)	0–2	FC Rhône Vallées (6)
12.	FC Cruseilles (7)	1–4	AS Savigneux-Montbrison (8)
13.	ES Manival (8)	0–2	AS Lyon-Duchère (3)
14.	Ville-la-Grand FC (10)	1–4	Hauts Lyonnais (6)
