= 2019–20 Coupe de France preliminary rounds, Méditerranée =

Football qualifying competition

The 2019–20 Coupe de France preliminary rounds, Méditerranée was the qualifying competition to decide which teams from the leagues of the Méditerranée region of France took part in the main competition from the seventh round.

A total of five teams qualified from the Méditerranée preliminary rounds. In 2018–19, Marignane Gignac FC progressed furthest in the main competition, reaching the round of 32 before losing to Iris Club de Croix after a penalty shoot-out.

== Schedule ==
The first two rounds of the qualifying competition took place on the weekends of 25 August and 2 September 2019. 180 teams entered at the first round, from the District leagues (tier 8 and below) with some from Régional 2 (tier 7), whilst the remaining nine teams from Régional 2 and the 11 teams from Régional 1 (tier 6) joined in round 2.

The third round draw was made on 4 September 2019. The nine clubs from Championnat National 3 (tier 5) joined at this stage.

The fourth round draw was published on 19 September 2019. The six clubs from Championnat National 2 (tier 4) joined at this stage, and 19 ties were drawn.

The fifth round draw was published on 2 October 2019. The single club from Championnat National (tier 3) joined at this stage, and ten ties were drawn.

The sixth round draw was made on 17 October 2019. Five ties were drawn.

=== First round ===
These matches were played on 24 and 25 August 2019.

First round results: Méditerranée
Tie no	Home team (tier)	Score	Away team (tier)
1.	Calavon FC (9)	1–2 (a.e.t.)	Dentelles FC (9)
2.	Montet Bornala Club Nice (9)	3–2	Entente St Sylvestre Nice Nord (9)
3.	CAS Eaux Nice (12)	7–2	ES Haute Siagne (11)
4.	ES St André (10)	1–3	FC Mougins Côte d'Azur (8)
5.	AO Tourrette-Levens (11)	4–3	FC Euro African (11)
6.	Stade Laurentin (9)	5–4 (a.e.t.)	CA Peymeinade (9)
7.	AS Roquebrune-Cap-Martin (8)	4–1	AS Roquefort (9)
8.	FC Antibes (8)	5–6	US Pegomas (7)
9.	FC Carros (8)	0–4	SC Mouans-Sartoux (7)
10.	Salon Nord (10)	3–1	FC Fuveau Provence (10)
11.	ASPTT Nice (11)	6–2	AS Traminots Alpes Maritimes (10)
12.	SO Roquettan (11)	0–3 (Note: Tie won by means of forfeit.)	Étoile Menton (10)
13.	Drap Football (10)	3–2	St Paul-la-Colle OC (10)
14.	Besse Sport (9)	1–3	FC Ramatuelle (7)
15.	FCUS Tropézienne (7)	1–2 (a.e.t.)	Gardia Club (7)
16.	US Pradet (9)	1–0	CA Cannetois (9)
17.	ES Villeneuve-Loubet (10)	3–1	CJ Antibes (8)
18.	AS Moulins (7)	1–4	AS Fontonne Antibes (7)
19.	FC Beausoleil (9)	3–1	US Cannes Bocca Olympique (10)
20.	US Biot (10)	1–2 (a.e.t.)	US Plan de Grasse (8)
21.	OC Blausasc (10)	1–2	ES Contoise (10)
22.	Olympique Suquetan Cannes Croisette (10)	3–0	ES des Baous (8)
23.	FC St Victoret (10)	6–5	FO Ventabren (10)
24.	FC St Mitre-les-Remparts (10)	0–4	US Venelles (8)
25.	AAS Val St André (9)	4–4 (3–5 p)	Luynes Sports (7)
26.	AS Ste Marguerite (10)	1–5	CA Gombertois (8)
27.	USPEG Marseille (9)	2–3	Burel FC (9)
28.	ES Milloise (8)	5–3	Aix Université CF (10)
29.	ES Salin-de-Giraud (11)	0–6	AC Arlésien (7)
30.	AS Mazargues (8)	7–1	Étoile Huveaune (9)
31.	ES Port-Saint-Louis-du-Rhône (10)	2–3	AS Martigues Sud (8)
32.	Pays d'Aix FC (10)	4–2	ES Cuges (10)
33.	Olympique Mallemortais (9)	2–0	JS Istréenne (10)
34.	FC La Ciotat-Ceyreste (9)	1–2	Olympique Rovenain (7)
35.	AS Bombardière (9)	0–3	USC Minots du Panier (8)
36.	AS Rognac (10)	0–12	US Trets (9)
37.	US Pélican (10)	2–4	CA Plan-de-Cuques (8)
38.	Gardanne Biver FC (7)	1–2 (a.e.t.)	FC Septèmes (7)
39.	CA Croix Sainte (10)	1–8	SC Montredon Bonneveine (8)
40.	ASCJ Félix Pyat (9)	3–0	JS Pennes Mirabeau (8)
41.	FC Chateauneuf-les-Martigues (9)	4–0	AS Simiane-Collongue (8)
42.	US Velauxienne (10)	0–0 (4–5 p)	US 1er Canton Marseille (10)
43.	AS Bouc Bel Air (7)	0–2	AC Port-de-Bouc (7)
44.	FC Lambescain (10)	0–3	JO St Gabriel (9)
45.	St Henri FC (10)	2–5	SC Kartala (9)
46.	FC Vidauban (10)	0–3	UA Valettoise (7)
47.	US Aiglun (9)	1–5	Gap Foot 05 (8)
48.	ES Boulbon (8)	2–1	FA Châteaurenard (9)
49.	ARC Cavaillon (9)	5–2	Avenir Club Avignonnais (9)
50.	ES Sud Luberon (10)	0–2	FC Carpentras (8)
51.	US Thoroise (11)	1–2	Olympique Montelais (9)
52.	FC Palunais (11)	0–3	Avenir Goult Roussillon (11)
53.	US Grès Orange Sud (11)	1–2	EM Angloise (8)
54.	SC Gadagnien (8)	2–2 (3–1 p)	US Avignonnaise (8)
55.	Orange FC (10)	2–1	USR Pertuis (10)
56.	FC Bonnieux (10)	1–4	Caumont FC (9)
57.	SC Althen-des-Paluds (9)	2–4	Olympique Novais (7)
58.	SO Velleronnais (9)	2–1	FC Cheval Blanc (10)
59.	Laragne Sports (9)	3–0	St Crépin Eygliers Sports
60.	SC Vinonnais (8)	1–6	AFC Ste Tulle-Pierrevert (8)
61.	FC Sisteron (8)	1–0	US Châteauneuf Aubignosc Peipin (9)
62.	US Vivo 04 (8)	2–0	FC Céreste-Reillanne (7)
63.	CA Digne 04 (8)	0–3	US Veynes-Serres (7)
64.	US Canton Riezois (8)	5–5 (3–4 p)	US Farenque (10)
65.	Espérance Sorguaise (9)	0–3	SC Montfavet (8)
66.	ACS Morières (9)	1–7	US Entraigues (9)
67.	AS Piolenc (10)	0–7	JS Visannaise (9)
68.	US Planaise (10)	2–2 (4–5 p)	Étoile d'Aubune (10)
69.	AS Rasteau (10)	2–3	AS Camaretois (9)
70.	SO Londais (8)	5–1	SC Cogolin (8)
71.	JS Beaussetanne (10)	1–4	Six-Fours Le Brusc FC (7)
72.	US Cuers-Pierrefeu (8)	3–0	ES Lorguaise (9)
73.	AS Arcoise (9)	3–4 (a.e.t.)	ES Solliès-Farlède (8)
74.	FC Revestois (11)	1–2	FC Pays de Fayence (9)
75.	SC Plantourian (10)	1–6	SL Hospitaliers IC Toulon-La Seyne-sur-Mer (8)
76.	FC Pugetois (9)	1–6	FC Seynois (8)
77.	US Sanary (9)	3–1	US La Cadière (9)
78.	RC La Baie (10)	1–2	AS St Cyr (8)
79.	ASPTT Hyères (10)	1–4	SC Draguignan (8)
80.	FC Grimaud (9)	1–2	AS Mar Vivo (9)
81.	FC Aureille (11)	5–2	FC Avignon Ouest (10)
82.	Olympic Barbentane (7)	3–1	SC Jonquières (7)
83.	FC Vignères (10)	0–2	AC Vedene (8)
84.	US Autre Provence (8)	0–1	RC Provence (9)
85.	EJGC Graveson (10)	4–3	SC St Martinois (10)
86.	US Eygalières (9)	1–5	Espérance Gordienne (9)
87.	FC Rocbaron (10)	0–2	Olympique St Maximinois (9)
88.	US Bandolaise (11)	0–3	AS Brignoles (10)
89.	US St Mandrier (8)	3–1	SO Lavandou (8)
90.	US Caderousse (10)	3–3 (1–2 p)	Boxeland Club Islois (9)

=== Second round ===
These matches were played on 1 September 2019.

Second round results: Méditerranée
Tie no	Home team (tier)	Score	Away team (tier)
1.	FC Sisteron (8)	1–0	US Vivo 04 (8)
2.	SC Montredon Bonneveine (8)	2–2 (2–4 p)	AS Mazargues (8)
3.	CA Plan-de-Cuques (8)	1–1 (7–6 p)	FC Septèmes (7)
4.	FC St Victoret (10)	0–2	USC Minots du Panier (8)
5.	Salon Nord (10)	4–2	US Venelles (8)
6.	US Entraigues (9)	0–2 (a.e.t.)	AC Arlésien (7)
7.	FA Val Durance (7)	3–0	US Pontet Grand Avignon 84 (7)
8.	Avenir Goult Roussillon (11)	0–4	RC Provence (9)
9.	FC Aureille (11)	1–1 (3–2 p)	Espérance Gordienne (9)
10.	AC Vedene (8)	3–1	Stade Maillanais (7)
11.	AS Camaretois (9)	2–1	Orange FC (10)
12.	Étoile d'Aubune (10)	3–0	EJGC Graveson (10)
13.	US 1er Canton Marseille (10)	1–2	JO St Gabriel (9)
14.	Luynes Sports (7)	3–0 (Note: Tie won by means of forfeit.)	Carnoux FC (6)
15.	Burel FC (9)	4–5 (a.e.t.)	Salon Bel Air (6)
16.	AFC Ste Tulle-Pierrevert (8)	2–0	US Veynes-Serres (7)
17.	Gap Foot 05 (8)	4–4 (5–4 p)	Laragne Sports (9)
18.	US Farenque (10)	0–1	ES La Ciotat (7)
19.	ES Milloise (8)	0–4	Stade Marseillais UC (6)
20.	Pays d'Aix FC (10)	0–2 (a.e.t.)	FC Rousset Ste Victoire (6)
21.	Olympique Mallemortais (9)	0–3	Berre SC (6)
22.	SC Kartala (9)	2–4	AC Port-de-Bouc (7)
23.	FC Chateauneuf-les-Martigues (9)	0–8	ES Fosséenne (7)
24.	CA Gombertois (8)	0–8	ES St Zacharie (7)
25.	AS Martigues Sud (8)	3–1	Olympique Rovenain (7)
26.	US Trets (9)	0–1	ASCJ Félix Pyat (9)
27.	JS Visannaise (9)	1–2	Caumont FC (9)
28.	EM Angloise (8)	0–6	SC Courthézon (6)
29.	Olympique Montelais (9)	0–4	Espérance Pernoise (7)
30.	Étoile Menton (10)	1–7	AS Cagnes-Le Cros (6)
31.	ES Contoise (10)	0–2	AS Fontonne Antibes (7)
32.	FC Pays de Fayence (9)	1–3	AS Maximoise (6)
33.	US Pradet (9)	0–2	SO Londais (8)
34.	FC Seynois (8)	1–2	US St Mandrier (8)
35.	SL Hospitaliers IC Toulon-La Seyne-sur-Mer (8)	3–2	FC Ramatuelle (7)
36.	ES Solliès-Farlède (8)	3–2	AS St Cyr (8)
37.	US Sanary (9)	0–3	SC Draguignan (8)
38.	US Cuers-Pierrefeu (8)	1–3	Six-Fours Le Brusc FC (7)
39.	AS Mar Vivo (9)	0–3	Gardia Club (7)
40.	CAS Eaux Nice (12)	0–7	AS Vence (7)
41.	Stade Laurentin (9)	1–1 (3–1 p)	Olympique Suquetan Cannes Croisette (10)
42.	Drap Football (10)	0–6	ES Cannet Rocheville (6)
43.	FC Carpentras (8)	0–0 (2–4 p)	SC Gadagnien (8)
44.	Boxeland Club Islois (9)	2–1	ARC Cavaillon (9)
45.	Dentelles FC (9)	1–5	ES Boulbon (8)
46.	SO Velleronnais (9)	0–4	Olympique Novais (7)
47.	SC Montfavet (8)	0–1	Olympic Barbentane (7)
48.	Montet Bornala Club Nice (9)	0–1 (a.e.t.)	US Cap d'Ail (7)
49.	SC Mouans-Sartoux (7)	4–1	RO Menton (6)
50.	US Plan de Grasse (8)	3–2	FC Beausoleil (9)
51.	ES Villeneuve-Loubet (10)	1–2	US Pegomas (7)
52.	ASPTT Nice (11)	2–0	AO Tourrette-Levens (11)
53.	FC Mougins Côte d'Azur (8)	3–2	AS Roquebrune-Cap-Martin (8)
54.	Olympique St Maximinois (9)	3–1	AS Brignoles (10)
55.	UA Valettoise (7)	0–4	US Carqueiranne-La Crau (6)

=== Third round ===
These matches were played on 14 and 15 September 2019.

Third round results: Méditerranée
Tie no	Home team (tier)	Score	Away team (tier)
1.	FC Aureille (11)	0–7	FC Istres (5)
2.	SC Mouans-Sartoux (7)	1–1 (5–4 p)	SC Draguignan (8)
3.	US Pegomas (7)	1–1 (4–2 p)	AS Mazargues (8)
4.	ASCJ Félix Pyat (9)	3–0	US Plan de Grasse (8)
5.	Olympique St Maximinois (9)	0–2	AS Maximoise (6)
6.	ASPTT Nice (11)	0–8	ES La Ciotat (7)
7.	US Mandelieu-La Napoule (5)	5–3	US Carqueiranne-La Crau (6)
8.	SL Hospitaliers IC Toulon-La Seyne-sur-Mer (8)	0–4	AS Gémenos (5)
9.	AS Vence (7)	3–4	US St Mandrier (8)
10.	Six-Fours Le Brusc FC (7)	2–0	FC Mougins Côte d'Azur (8)
11.	Gardia Club (7)	2–5 (a.e.t.)	FC Rousset Ste Victoire (6)
12.	USC Minots du Panier (8)	0–1	US Cap d'Ail (7)
13.	ES Solliès-Farlède (8)	2–6	Villefranche Saint-Jean Beaulieu FC (5)
14.	AS Cagnes-Le Cros (6)	2–0	ES St Zacharie (7)
15.	SO Londais (8)	5–2	ES Cannet Rocheville (6)
16.	JO St Gabriel (9)	0–4	Stade Laurentin (9)
17.	SC Gadagnien (8)	2–3	EUGA Ardziv (5)
18.	Berre SC (6)	0–2	Stade Marseillais UC (6)
19.	Étoile d'Aubune (10)	1–2	AC Arlésien (7)
20.	AC Port-de-Bouc (7)	1–1 (3–1 p)	Olympic Barbentane (7)
21.	Salon Nord (10)	0–0 (1–3 p)	SC Courthézon (6)
22.	ES Fosséenne (7)	4–3 (a.e.t.)	FC Côte Bleue (5)
23.	AC Vedene (8)	4–1	FC Sisteron (8)
24.	Olympique Novais (7)	1–2	CA Plan-de-Cuques (8)
25.	ES Boulbon (8)	1–4	FA Val Durance (7)
26.	AS Camaretois (9)	2–0	Luynes Sports (7)
27.	Gap Foot 05 (8)	1–3	Aubagne FC (5)
28.	Caumont FC (9)	1–3	Salon Bel Air (6)
29.	RC Provence (9)	4–1	Espérance Pernoise (7)
30.	Boxeland Club Islois (9)	1–6 (a.e.t.)	Athlético Marseille (5)
31.	AFC Ste Tulle-Pierrevert (8)	2–1	AS Martigues Sud (8)
32.	AS Fontonne Antibes (7)	1–3	AS Cannes (5)

=== Fourth round ===
These matches were played on 28 and 29 September 2019.

Fourth round results: Méditerranée
Tie no	Home team (tier)	Score	Away team (tier)
1.	CA Plan-de-Cuques (8)	0–1	Salon Bel Air (6)
2.	FA Val Durance (7)	0–0 (3–4 p)	FC Martigues (4)
3.	AC Vedene (8)	2–0	AS Camaretois (9)
4.	US Cap d'Ail (7)	2–0	AFC Ste Tulle-Pierrevert (8)
5.	Hyères FC (4)	0–1	FC Istres (5)
6.	US Marseille Endoume (4)	3–1	US Mandelieu-La Napoule (5)
7.	SC Courthézon (6)	5–2	AC Arlésien (7)
8.	Stade Laurentin (9)	0–7	AS Gémenos (5)
9.	Athlético Marseille (5)	2–0	Aubagne FC (5)
10.	Villefranche Saint-Jean Beaulieu FC (5)	4–1	Stade Marseillais UC (6)
11.	AS Maximoise (6)	1–4	AS Cagnes-Le Cros (6)
12.	RC Provence (9)	0–3	RC Grasse (4)
13.	ES La Ciotat (7)	0–0 (1–3 p)	US Pegomas (7)
14.	SC Mouans-Sartoux (7)	0–1	Étoile Fréjus Saint-Raphaël (4)
15.	SO Londais (8)	5–0	ASCJ Félix Pyat (9)
16.	Six-Fours Le Brusc FC (7)	0–1	EUGA Ardziv (5)
17.	FC Rousset Ste Victoire (6)	0–5	AS Cannes (5)
18.	AC Port-de-Bouc (7)	0–5	Marignane Gignac F.C. (4)
19.	US St Mandrier (8)	0–0 (4–1 p)	ES Fosséenne (7)

=== Fifth round ===
These matches were played on 11, 12 and 13 October 2019.

Fifth round results: Méditerranée
Tie no	Home team (tier)	Score	Away team (tier)
1.	FC Martigues (4)	1–2	Athlético Marseille (5)
2.	AS Cagnes-Le Cros (6)	0–0 (1–3 p)	US Cap d'Ail (7)
3.	SO Londais (8)	2–2 (1–4 p)	US Marseille Endoume (4)
4.	Salon Bel Air (6)	1–2	EUGA Ardziv (5)
5.	US St Mandrier (8)	1–1 (4–3 p)	SC Courthézon (6)
6.	AS Cannes (5)	3–0	Sporting Club Toulon (3)
7.	Étoile Fréjus Saint-Raphaël (4)	2–0	Villefranche Saint-Jean Beaulieu FC (5)
8.	AC Vedene (8)	0–1	AS Gémenos (5)
9.	US Pegomas (7)	0–1	FC Istres (5)
10.	Marignane Gignac F.C. (4)	1–2	RC Grasse (4)

=== Sixth round ===
These matches were played on 26 and 27 October 2019.

Sixth round results: Méditerranée
Tie no	Home team (tier)	Score	Away team (tier)
1.	FC Istres (5)	2–2 (2–3 p)	Athlético Marseille (5)
2.	EUGA Ardziv (5)	3–2	AS Cannes (5)
3.	RC Grasse (4)	2–0	AS Gémenos (5)
4.	US Cap d'Ail (7)	0–0 (3–5 p)	US Marseille Endoume (4)
5.	US St Mandrier (8)	0–3	Étoile Fréjus Saint-Raphaël (4)
