= List of football clubs in France =

This is a list of notable men's and women's football clubs that competed within the leagues and divisions of the French football league system during the 2025–26 season. Also included are clubs from outside France that play within the French system (suitably highlighted).

== By league and division ==
=== National leagues ===
- Professional men's divisions
  - Ligue 1 (level 1)
  - Ligue 2 (level 2)
  - Ligue 3 (level 3)
- Semi-professional to amateur men's divisions
  - National 1 (level 4)
  - National 2 (level 5)
- Professional women's divisions
  - Première Ligue (level 1)
  - Seconde Ligue (level 2)
- Semi-professional women's division
  - Division 3 Féminine (level 3)

=== Regional and district leagues ===
Structure of leagues from level 6 and below can be viewed at French football league system.

== Alphabetical list ==
=== A ===
Club	Division	Level	Location	Department	Region
SC Abbeville	Régional 1	6	Abbeville	Somme	Hauts-de-France
RCO Agde	National 3	5	Agde	Hérault	Occitanie
SU Agen	Régional 3	8	Agen	Lot-et-Garonne	Nouvelle-Aquitaine
US Salinières Aigues Mortes	Régional 1	6	Aigues-Mortes	Gard	Occitanie
Ain Sud	National 3	5	Saint-Maurice-de-Beynost	Ain	Auvergne-Rhône-Alpes
AC Ajaccio	Ligue 2	2	Ajaccio	Corse-du-Sud	Corsica
Gazélec Ajaccio	Regional 1	6	Ajaccio	Corse-du-Sud	Corsica
ASPTT Albi	Seconde Ligue	2	Albi	Tarn	Occitanie
US Albi	Régional 3	8	Albi	Tarn	Occitanie
Olympique Alès	National 3	5	Alès	Gard	Occitanie
US Alençon	National 3	5	Alençon	Orne	Normandy
AS Algrange	Régional 3	8	Algrange	Moselle	Grand Est
FCUS Ambert	Régional 2	7	Ambert	Puy-de-Dôme	Auvergne-Rhône-Alpes
AC Amboise	District 3	11	Amboise	Indre-et-Loire	Centre-Val de Loire
AC Amiens	National 3	5	Amiens	Somme	Hauts-de-France
Amiens SC	Ligue 2	2	Amiens	Somme	Hauts-de-France
J3S Amilly	National 3	5	Amilly	Loiret	Centre-Val de Loire
CSO Amnéville	National 3	5	Amnéville	Moselle	Grand Est
Andrézieux-Bouthéon FC	National 2	4	Andrézieux-Bouthéon	Loire	Auvergne-Rhône-Alpes
Angers SCO	Ligue 1	2	Angers	Maine-et-Loire	Pays de la Loire
Genêts Anglet	National 3	5	Anglet	Pyrénées-Atlantiques	Nouvelle-Aquitaine
Angoulême-Soyaux Charente	National 2	4	Angoulême	Charente	Nouvelle-Aquitaine
FC Annecy	Ligue 2	3	Annecy	Haute Savoie	Auvergne-Rhône-Alpes
FC Antibes	District 1	8	Antibes	Alpes-Maritimes	Provence-Alpes-Côte d'Azur
FC Bassin d'Arcachon	Régional 1	6	Arcachon	Gironde	Nouvelle-Aquitaine
JA Armentières	District 1	9	Armentières	Nord	Hauts-de-France
Arras FA	Régional 1	6	Arras	Pas-de-Calais	Hauts-de-France
Aubagne FC	National 2	4	Aubagne	Bouches-du-Rhône	Provence-Alpes-Côte d'Azur
FCM Aubervilliers	National 3	5	Aubervilliers	Seine-Saint-Denis	Île-de-France
FC Aurillac Arpajon Cantal Auvergne	National 3	5	Aurillac	Cantal	Auvergne-Rhône-Alpes
AJ Auxerre	Ligue 1	2	Auxerre	Yonne	Bourgogne-Franche-Comté
Avenir Club Avignonnais	District 2	9	Avignon	Vaucluse	Provence-Alpes-Côte d'Azur
CS Avion	Régional 1	6	Avion	Pas-de-Calais	Hauts-de-France
Avoine OCC	National 3	5	Avoine	Indre-et-Loire	Centre-Val de Loire
US Avranches	National	3	Avranches	Manche	Normandy

=== B ===
Club	Division	Level	Location	Department	Region
FC Bagnols Pont	Régional 1	6	Bagnols-sur-Cèze	Gard	Occitanie
FC Balagne	Régional 1	6	L'Île-Rousse	Haute-Corse	Corsica
Balma SC	National 3	5	Balma	Haute-Garonne	Occitanie
FC Bastelicaccia	Régional 1	6	Bastelicaccia	Corse-du-Sud	Corsica
FC Borgo	National 2	4	Borgo	Haute-Corse	Corsica
SC Bastia	Ligue 2	2	Bastia	Haute-Corse	Corsica
Aviron Bayonnais FC	National 2	4	Bayonne	Pyrénées-Atlantiques	Nouvelle-Aquitaine
Stade Beaucairois	National 3	5	Beaucaire	Gard	Occitanie
AS Beaune	Régional 2	7	Beaune	Côte-d'Or	Bourgogne-Franche-Comté
AS Beauvais Oise	National 2	4	Beauvais	Oise	Hauts-de-France
ASM Belfort	National 2	4	Belfort	Territoire de Belfort	Bourgogne-Franche-Comté
Bergerac Périgord FC	National 2	4	Bergerac	Dordogne	Nouvelle-Aquitaine
Besançon Football	National 3	5	Besançon	Doubs	Bourgogne-Franche-Comté
Racing Besançon	National 2	4	Besançon	Doubs	Bourgogne-Franche-Comté
AS Béziers	National 3	5	Béziers	Hérault	Occitanie
ASC Biesheim	National 3	5	Biesheim	Haut-Rhin	Grand Est
Blagnac FC	National 3	5	Blagnac	Haute-Garonne	Occitanie
Blois Football 41	National 2	4	Blois	Loir-et-Cher	Centre-Val de Loire
Football Club 93 Bobigny-Bagnolet-Gagny	National 2	4	Bobigny	Seine-Saint-Denis	Île-de-France
FUSC Bois-Guillaume	Régional 1	6	Bois-Guillaume	Seine-Maritime	Normandy
ES Bonchamp	Régional 1	6	Bonchamp-lès-Laval	Mayenne	Pays de la Loire
FC Girondins de Bordeaux	National 2	4	Bordeaux	Gironde	Nouvelle-Aquitaine
FC Girondins de Bordeaux (women)	Première Ligue	1	Bordeaux	Gironde	Nouvelle-Aquitaine
Stade Bordelais	National 2	4	Bordeaux	Gironde	Nouvelle-Aquitaine
US Boulogne	Ligue 2	2	Boulogne-sur-Mer	Pas-de-Calais	Hauts-de-France
Athletic Club de Boulogne-Billancourt	Régional 1	6	Boulogne-Billancourt	Hauts-de-Seine	Île-de-France
Bourges Foot 18	National 2	4	Bourges	Cher	Centre-Val de Loire
Football Bourg-en-Bresse Péronnas 01	National	3	Bourg-en-Bresse	Ain	Auvergne-Rhône-Alpes
FC Bourgoin-Jallieu	National 3	5	Bourgoin-Jallieu	Isère	Auvergne-Rhône-Alpes
Stade Brestois 29	Ligue 1	1	Brest	Finistère	Brittany
Stade Briochin	National	3	Saint-Brieuc	Côtes-d'Armor	Brittany
ESA Brive	Régional 1	6	Brive-la-Gaillarde	Corrèze	Nouvelle-Aquitaine
Bulgnéville Contrex Vittel FC	Régional 3	8	Bulgnéville, Contrexéville, Vittel	Vosges	Grand Est

=== C ===
Club	Division	Level	Location	Department	Region
Stade Malherbe Caen	Ligue 2	2	Caen	Calvados	Normandy
AC Cambrai	Régional 1	6	Cambrai	Nord	Hauts-de-France
AS Cannes	National 3	5	Cannes	Alpes-Maritimes	Provence-Alpes-Côte d'Azur
ES Cannet Rocheville	National 3	5	Le Cannet	Alpes-Maritimes	Provence-Alpes-Côte d'Azur
Canet Roussillon FC	National 3	5	Canet-en-Roussillon	Pyrénées-Orientales	Occitanie
USJA Carquefou	Régional 2	7	Carquefou	Loire-Atlantique	Pays de la Loire
Castelnau Le Crès FC	Régional 1	6	Le Crès	Hérault	Occitanie
Cergy Pontoise FC	Régional 1	6	Cergy-Pontoise	Val-d'Oise and Yvelines	Île-de-France
FC Chalon	Régional 1	6	Chalon-sur-Saône	Saône-et-Loire	Bourgogne-Franche-Comté
FC Chamalières	National 2	4	Chamalières	Puy-de-Dôme	Auvergne-Rhône-Alpes
Chambéry SF	National 3	5	Chambéry	Savoie	Auvergne-Rhône-Alpes
FC Chambly Oise	National 2	4	Chambly	Oise	Hauts-de-France
US Changé	National 3	5	Changé	Mayenne	Pays de la Loire
US Chantilly	National 3	5	Chantilly	Oise	Hauts-de-France
Olympique Charleville Neufmanil Aiglemont	Régional 3	8	Charleville-Mézières	Ardennes	Grand Est
C'Chartres Football	National 2	4	Chartres	Eure-et-Loir	Centre-Val de Loire
Voltigeurs de Châteaubriant	National 2	4	Châteaubriant	Loire-Atlantique	Pays de la Loire
OC Châteaudun	District 1	9	Châteaudun	Eure-et-Loir	Centre-Val de Loire
LB Châteauroux	National	3	Châteauroux	Indre	Centre-Val de Loire
SO Châtellerault	National 3	5	Châtellerault	Vienne	Nouvelle-Aquitaine
Chaumont FC	Régional 1	6	Chaumont	Haute-Marne	Grand Est
US Chauvigny	National 3	5	Chauvigny	Vienne	Nouvelle-Aquitaine
JS Chemin Bas d'Avignon	Régional 2	7	Nîmes	Gard	Occitanie
AS Cherbourg Football	National 3	5	Cherbourg-en-Cotentin	Manche	Normandy
AS Choisy-le-Roi	Régional 2	7	Choisy-le-Roi	Val-de-Marne	Île-de-France
SO Cholet	National	3	Cholet	Maine-et-Loire	Pays de la Loire
Clermont Foot	Ligue 2	1	Clermont-Ferrand	Puy-de-Dôme	Auvergne-Rhône-Alpes
UA Cognac	National 3	5	Cognac	Charente	Nouvelle-Aquitaine
US Colomiers Football	National 2	4	Colomiers	Haute-Garonne	Occitanie
AFC Compiègne	Régional 1	6	Compiègne	Oise	Hauts-de-France
US Concarneau	Ligue 2	2	Concarneau	Finistère	Brittany
USC Corte	National 3	5	Corte	Haute-Corse	Corsica
FC Cournon-d'Auvergne	Régional 2	7	Cournon-d'Auvergne	Puy-de-Dôme	Auvergne-Rhône-Alpes
US Créteil-Lusitanos	National.2	4	Créteil	Val-de-Marne	Île-de-France
Iris Club de Croix	National 3	5	Croix	Nord	Hauts-de-France

=== D ===
Club	Division	Level	Location	Department	Region
FC Déolois	National 3	5	Déols	Indre	Centre-Val de Loire
FC Dieppe	National 3	5	Dieppe	Seine-Maritime	Normandy
Dijon FCO	National	3	Dijon	Côte-d'Or	Bourgogne-Franche-Comté
Dijon FCO (women)	Première Ligue	1	Dijon	Côte-d'Or	Bourgogne-Franche-Comté
Dinan-Léhon FC	National 2	4	Dinan	Côtes-d'Armor	Brittany
SU Dives-Cabourg	National 3	5	Dives-sur-Mer	Calvados	Normandy
SC Douai	Régional 2	7	Douai	Nord	Hauts-de-France
SC Draguignan	Régional 3	8	Draguignan	Var	Provence-Alpes-Côte d'Azur
JA Drancy	National 3	5	Drancy	Seine-Saint-Denis	Île-de-France
FC Drouais	Régional 1	6	Dreux	Eure-et-Loir	Centre-Val de Loire
USL Dunkerque	Ligue 2	2	Dunkirk	Nord	Hauts-de-France

=== E ===
Club	Division	Level	Location	Department	Region
FC Échirolles	Régional 1	6	Échirolles	Isère	Auvergne-Rhône-Alpes
Écommoy FC	Régional 3	8	Écommoy	Sarthe	Pays de la Loire
RC Épernay Champagne	National 3	5	Épernay	Marne	Grand Est
SAS Épinal	National	3	Épinal	Vosges	Grand Est
AS Étaples	Régional 2	7	Étaples	Pas-de-Calais	Hauts-de-France
Évreux FC 27	National 2	4	Évreux	Eure	Normandy
Évry FC	Régional 3	8	Évry-Courcouronnes	Essonne	Île-de-France

=== F ===
Club	Division	Level	Location	Department	Region
AS Fabrègues	National 3	5	Fabrègues	Hérault	Occitanie
USF Fécamp	Régional 2	7	Fécamp	Seine-Maritime	Normandy
Entente Feignies Aulnoye FC	National 3	5	Feignies	Nord	Hauts-de-France
US Feurs	Régional 1	6	Feurs	Loire	Auvergne-Rhône-Alpes
FC Fleury 91	National 2	4	Fleury-Mérogis	Essonne	Île-de-France
FC Fleury 91 (women)	Première Ligue	1	Fleury-Mérogis	Essonne	Île-de-France
RCP Fontainebleau	Départmental 1	9	Fontainebleau	Seine-et-Marne	Île-de-France
Vendée Fontenay Foot	National 3	5	Fontenay-le-Comte	Vendée	Pays de la Loire
US Forbach	Régional 1	6	Forbach	Moselle	Grand Est
Étoile Fréjus Saint-Raphaël	National 2	4	Fréjus	Var	Provence-Alpes-Côte d'Azur
AS Furiani-Agliani	National 2	4	Furiani	Haute-Corse	Corsica

=== G ===
Club	Division	Level	Location	Department	Region
Gardanne Biver Football Club	Régional 2	7	Gardanne	Bouches-du-Rhône	Provence-Alpes-Côte d'Azur
AS Gien	Départmental 3	11	Gien	Loiret	Centre-Val de Loire
GOAL FC	National	3	Chasselay	Rhône	Auvergne-Rhône-Alpes
ESM Gonfreville	Régional 1	6	Gonfreville-l'Orcher	Seine-Maritime	Normandy
Olympique Grande-Synthe	Régional 1	6	Grande-Synthe	Nord	Hauts-de-France
US Granville	National 2	4	Granville	Manche	Normandy
RC Grasse	National 2	4	Grasse	Alpes-Maritimes	Provence-Alpes-Côte d'Azur
ES Grau-du-Roi	Régional 3	8	Le Grau-du-Roi	Gard	Occitanie
Union Sportive Gravelines Football	Régional 1	6	Gravelines	Nord	Hauts-de-France
Grenoble Foot 38	Ligue 2	2	Grenoble	Isère	Auvergne-Rhône-Alpes
Grenoble Foot 38 (women)	Seconde Ligue	2	Grenoble	Isère	Auvergne-Rhône-Alpes
FC Gueugnon	National 3	5	Gueugnon	Saône-et-Loire	Bourgogne-Franche-Comté
FC Guichen	Régional 1	6	Guichen	Ille-et-Vilaine	Brittany
En Avant Guingamp	Ligue 2	2	Guingamp	Côtes-d'Armor	Brittany
En Avant de Guingamp (women)	Seconde Ligue	2	Saint-Brieuc	Côtes-d'Armor	Brittany

=== H ===
Club	Division	Level	Location	Department	Region
FCSR Haguenau	National 2	4	Haguenau	Bas-Rhin	Grand Est
SC Hazebrouck	Régional 1	6	Hazebrouck	Nord	Hauts-de-France
Hauts Lyonnais	National 3	5	Pomeys	Rhône	Auvergne-Rhône-Alpes
FCF Hénin-Beaumont	Féminine Régional 1	3	Hénin-Beaumont	Pas-de-Calais	Hauts-de-France
Hyères FC	National 2	4	Hyères	Var	Provence-Alpes-Côte d'Azur

=== I ===
Club	Division	Level	Location	Department	Region
AS Illzach Modenheim	Régional 1	6	Illzach	Haut-Rhin	Grand Est
Is-Selongey Football	National 3	5	Selongey	Côte-d'Or	Bourgogne-Franche-Comté
ASA Issy	Régional 2	7	Issy-les-Moulineaux	Hauts-de-Seine	Île-de-France
FC Istres	National 3	5	Istres	Bouches-du-Rhône	Provence-Alpes-Côte d'Azur
US Ivry	National 3	5	Ivry-sur-Seine	Val-de-Marne	Île-de-France

=== J ===
Club	Division	Level	Location	Department	Region
Jarville JF	Régional 1	6	Jarville-la-Malgrange	Meurthe-et-Moselle	Grand Est
Joué-lès-Tours FCT	Régional 2	7	Joué-lès-Tours	Indre-et-Loire	Centre-Val de Loire
Jura Dolois Foot	National 3	5	Dole	Jura	Bourgogne-Franche-Comté
Jura Sud Foot	National 2	4	Lavans-lès-Saint-Claude	Jura	Bourgogne-Franche-Comté

=== L ===
Club	Division	Level	Location	Department	Region
FC La Chapelle-des-Marais	Régional 3	8	La Chapelle-des-Marais	Loire-Atlantique	Pays de la Loire
AS La Châtaigneraie	National 3	5	La Châtaigneraie	Vendée	Pays de la Loire
ES La Ciotat	Régional 2	7	La Ciotat	Bouches-du-Rhône	Provence-Alpes-Côte d'Azur
La Flèche RC	Régional 1	6	La Flèche	Sarthe	Pays de la Loire
ESOF La Roche-sur-Yon	Régional 1	6	La Roche-sur-Yon	Vendée	Pays de la Loire
ESOF Vendée La Roche-sur-Yon	Seconde Ligue	2	La Roche-sur-Yon	Vendée	Pays de la Loire
La Roche VF	National 3	5	La Roche-sur-Yon	Vendée	Pays de la Loire
ES La Rochelle	Régional 1	6	La Rochelle	Charente-Maritime	Nouvelle-Aquitaine
Lannion FC	National 3	5	Lannion	Côtes-d'Armor	Brittany
US Laon	Régional 1	6	Laon	Aisne	Hauts-de-France
Stade Lavallois	Ligue 2	2	Laval	Mayenne	Pays de la Loire
Le Havre AC	Ligue 1	1	Le Havre	Seine-Maritime	Normandy
Le Havre AC (women)	Première Ligue	1	Le Havre	Seine-Maritime	Normandy
Le Mans FC	National	3	Le Mans	Sarthe	Pays de la Loire
ASF Le Perreux	District 1	9	Le Perreux-sur-Marne	Val-de-Marne	Île-de-France
Le Puy Foot 43 Auvergne	National 2	4	Le Puy-en-Velay	Haute-Loire	Auvergne-Rhône-Alpes
Le Touquet AC	National 3	5	Le Touquet	Pas-de-Calais	Hauts-de-France
Les Herbiers VF	National 2	4	Les Herbiers	Vendée	Pays de la Loire
FC Les Lilas	Régional 1	6	Les Lilas	Seine-Saint-Denis	Île-de-France
TVEC Les Sables-d'Olonne	Régional 1	6	Les Sables-d'Olonne	Vendée	Pays de la Loire
CO Les Ulis	National 3	5	Les Ulis	Essonne	Île-de-France
RC Lens	Ligue 1	1	Lens	Pas-de-Calais	Hauts-de-France
Racing Club de Lens Féminin	Première Ligue	1	Lens	Pas-de-Calais	Hauts-de-France
US Lesquin	Régional 1	6	Lesquin	Nord	Hauts-de-France
FC Libourne	National 2	4	Gironde	Libourne	Nouvelle-Aquitaine
La Ligugéenne Football	Régional 2	7	Ligugé	Vienne	Nouvelle-Aquitaine
Lille OSC	Ligue 1	1	Villeneuve-d'Ascq	Nord	Hauts-de-France
Lille OSC (women)	Seconde Ligue	2	Villeneuve-d'Ascq	Nord	Hauts-de-France
FC Limonest Saint-Didier	National 3	5	Limonest	Lyon Metropolis	Auvergne-Rhône-Alpes
ESA Linas-Montlhéry	National 3	5	Linas, Montlhéry	Essonne	Île-de-France
FC Loon-Plage	Régional 1	6	Loon-Plage	Nord	Hauts-de-France
FC Lorient	Ligue 2	1	Lorient	Morbihan	Brittany
Louhans-Cuiseaux FC	National 2	4	Louhans	Saône-et-Loire	Bourgogne-Franche-Comté
AF Lozère	Régional 1	6	Mende	Lozère	Occitanie
Amicale de Lucé	Régional 3	8	Lucé	Eure-et-Loir	Centre-Val de Loire
GC Lucciana	National 3	5	Lucciana	Haute-Corse	Corsica
Luçon FC	Régional 2	7	Luçon	Vendée	Pays de la Loire
Luzenac AP	Régional 1	6	Luzenac	Ariège	Occitanie
FC Lyon	Régional 1	6	Lyon	Lyon Metropolis	Auvergne-Rhône-Alpes
Olympique Lyonnais	Ligue 1	1	Décines-Charpieu	Lyon Metropolis	Auvergne-Rhône-Alpes
OL Lyonnes	Première Ligue	1	Décines-Charpieu	Lyon Metropolis	Auvergne-Rhône-Alpes
Lyon La Duchère	National 3	5	Lyon	Lyon Metropolis	Auvergne-Rhône-Alpes

=== M ===
Club	Division	Level	Location	Department	Region
UF Mâconnais	Régional 1	6	Mâcon	Saône-et-Loire	Bourgogne-Franche-Comté
USM Malakoff	Départemental 3	11	Malakoff	Hauts-de-Seine	Île-de-France
SC Malesherbes	District 1	9	Malesherbes	Loiret	Centre-Val de Loire
EP Manosque	District 1	8	Manosque	Alpes-de-Haute-Provence	Provence-Alpes-Côte d'Azur
FC Mantois 78	National 3	5	Mantes-la-Ville	Yvelines	Île-de-France
AS Marck	Régional 1	6	Marck	Pas-de-Calais	Hauts-de-France
Marignane GCB	National	3	Marignane	Bouches-du-Rhône	Provence-Alpes-Côte d'Azur
FC Marmande 47	Régional 1	6	Marmande	Lot-et-Garonne	Nouvelle-Aquitaine
SC Marnaval	Régional 1	6	Saint-Dizier	Haute-Marne	Grand Est
Athlético Marseille	District League, Provence	TBC	Marseille	Bouches-du-Rhône	Provence-Alpes-Côte d'Azur
Olympique de Marseille	Ligue 1	1	Marseille	Bouches-du-Rhône	Provence-Alpes-Côte d'Azur
Olympique de Marseille (women)	Première Ligue	2	Marseille	Bouches-du-Rhône	Provence-Alpes-Côte d'Azur
US Marseille Endoume	National 3	5	Marseille	Bouches-du-Rhône	Provence-Alpes-Côte d'Azur
FC Martigues	Ligue 2	3	Martigues	Bouches-du-Rhône	Provence-Alpes-Côte d'Azur
CS Meaux	National 3	5	Meaux	Seine-et-Marne	Île-de-France
FC Melun	Régional 2	7	Melun	Seine-et-Marne	Île-de-France
Rapid de Menton	Régional 1	6	Menton	Alpes-Maritimes	Provence-Alpes-Côte d'Azur
SO Merlebach	Régional 3	8	Freyming-Merlebach	Moselle	Grand Est
FC Metz	Ligue 2	1	Metz	Moselle	Grand Est
FC Metz (women)	Seconde Ligue	2	Metz	Moselle	Grand Est
AS Monaco FC	Ligue 1	1	Monaco		
USON Mondeville	Régional 1	6	Mondeville	Calvados	Normandy
US Montagnarde	Régional 1	6	Inzinzac-Lochrist	Morbihan	Brittany
USM Montargis	National 3	5	Montargis	Loiret	Centre-Val de Loire
Montauban FCTG	Régional 2	7	Montauban	Tarn-et-Garonne	Occitanie
FC Montceau Bourgogne	National 3	5	Montceau-les-Mines	Saône-et-Loire	Bourgogne-Franche-Comté
UMS Montélimar	Régional 2	7	Montélimar	Drôme	Auvergne-Rhône-Alpes
AS Montigny-le-Bretonneux	Féminine Régional 2	4	Montigny-le-Bretonneux	Yvelines	Île-de-France
Stade Montois	National 3	5	Mont-de-Marsan	Landes	Nouvelle-Aquitaine
Montpellier HSC	Ligue 1	1	Montpellier	Hérault	Occitanie
Montpellier HSC (women)	Première Ligue	1	Villeneuve-lès-Maguelone	Hérault	Occitanie
AS Monts	Régional 3	8	Monts	Indre-et-Loire	Centre-Val de Loire
FC Morangis-Chilly	Régional 2	7	Morangis	Essonne	Île-de-France
AS Moulins	National 3	5	Moulins	Allier	Auvergne-Rhône-Alpes
Moulins Yzeure Foot	National 2	4	Yzeure	Allier	Auvergne-Rhône-Alpes
FC Mulhouse	Regional 1	6	Mulhouse	Haut-Rhin	Grand Est
AS Muret	National 3	5	Muret	Haute-Garonne	Occitanie
AS Mutzig	Régional 3	8	Mutzig	Bas-Rhin	Grand Est

=== N ===
Club	Division	Level	Location	Department	Region
AS Nancy Lorraine	Ligue 2	2	Nancy	Meurthe-et-Moselle	Grand Est
FC Nantes	Ligue 1	1	Nantes	Loire-Atlantique	Pays de la Loire
FC Nantes (women)	Première Ligue	1	Loire-Atlantique	Pays de la Loire	Pays de la Loire
GS Neuves-Maisons	Régional 2	7	Neuves-Maisons	Meurthe-et-Moselle	Grand Est
FC Nevers 58	Régional 3	8	Nevers	Nièvre	Bourgogne-Franche-Comté
OGC Nice	Ligue 1	1	Nice	Alpes-Maritimes	Provence-Alpes-Côte d'Azur
Nîmes Olympique			Nîmes	Gard	Occitanie
Chamois Niortais F.C.			Niort	Deux-Sèvres	Nouvelle-Aquitaine
US Nœux-les-Mines	Régional 1	6	Nœux-les-Mines	Pas-de-Calais	Hauts-de-France
Olympique Noisy-le-Sec	Régional 1	6	Noisy-le-Sec	Seine-Saint-Denis	Île-de-France

=== O ===
Club	Division	Level	Location	Department	Region
FCSR Obernai	Régional 2	7	Obernai	Bas-Rhin	Grand Est
CMS Oissel	National 3	5	Oissel	Seine-Maritime	Normandy
USM Olivet	Régional 2	7	Olivet	Loiret	Centre-Val de Loire
US Orléans	National	3	Orléans	Loiret	Centre-Val de Loire
AS Ornans	Régional 1	6	Ornans	Doubs	Bourgogne-Franche-Comté

=== P ===
Club	Division	Level	Location	Department	Region
Pacy Ménilles RC	Régional 1	6	Pacy-sur-Eure	Eure	Normandy
AS Panazol	Régional 2	7	Panazol	Haute-Vienne	Nouvelle-Aquitaine
Paris 13 Atletico	National	3	Paris	Paris	Île-de-France
CA Paris-Charenton	Régional 3	8	Charenton-le-Pont	Val-de-Marne	Île-de-France
Paris FC	Ligue 1	1	Paris	Paris	Île-de-France
Paris FC (women)	Première Ligue	1	Viry-Châtillon	Essonne	Île-de-France
UJA Maccabi Paris Métropole	Régional 3	8	Alfortville	Val-de-Marne	Île-de-France
Paris Saint-Germain F.C.	Ligue 1	1	Paris	Paris	Île-de-France
Paris Saint-Germain Féminine	Première Ligue	1	Paris	Paris	Île-de-France
Paris Université Club	District 2	10	Paris	Paris	Île-de-France
Pau FC	Ligue 2	2	Pau	Pyrénées-Atlantiques	Nouvelle-Aquitaine
ES Paulhan-Pézenas	District 2	10	Pézenas	Hérault	Occitanie
Pays d'Aix FC	Départmental 2	9	Aix-en-Provence	Bouches-du-Rhône	Provence-Alpes-Côte d'Azur
US Pays de Cassel	Régional 1	6	Arnèke	Nord	Hauts-de-France
Périgueux Foot	Départmental 2	10	Périgueux	Dordogne	Nouvelle-Aquitaine
Stade Plabennécois	National 2	4	Plabennec	Finistère	Brittany
Vendée Poiré-sur-Vie Football	National 3	5	Le Poiré-sur-Vie	Vendée	Pays de la Loire
AS Poissy	National 2	4	Poissy	Yvelines	Île-de-France
Stade Poitevin FC	National 3	5	Poitiers	Vienne	Nouvelle-Aquitaine
US Pont-de-Roide	Régional 1	6	Pont-de-Roide-Vermondans	Doubs	Bourgogne-Franche-Comté
CA Pontarlier	National 3	5	Pontarlier	Doubs	Bourgogne-Franche-Comté
US Pontet Grand Avignon 84	Régional 2	7	Le Pontet	Vaucluse	Provence-Alpes-Côte d'Azur
GSI Pontivy	National 3	5	Pontivy	Morbihan	Brittany
AS Prix-lès-Mézières	National 3	5	Prix-lès-Mézières	Ardennes	Grand Est

=== Q ===
Club	Division	Level	Location	Department	Region
US Quevilly-Rouen Métropole	Ligue 2	2	Le Petit-Quevilly	Seine-Maritime	Normandy
Quimper Kerfeunteun F.C.	Régional 2	7	Quimper	Finistère	Brittany

=== R ===
Club	Division	Level	Location	Department	Region
Racing Club de France Football	National 2	4	Colombes	Hauts-de-Seine	Île-de-France
US Raon-l'Étape	National 3	5	Raon-l'Étape	Vosges	Grand Est
Red Star F.C.	National	3	Saint-Ouen	Seine-Saint-Denis	Île-de-France
Stade de Reims	Ligue 1	1	Reims	Marne	Grand Est
Stade de Reims Féminines	Seconde Ligue	1	Reims	Marne	Grand Est
Reims Sainte-Anne	Régional 1	6	Reims	Marne	Grand Est
Stade Rennais F.C.	Ligue 1	1	Rennes	Ille-et-Vilaine	Brittany
Toulouse Rodéo FC	Régional 1	6	Toulouse	Haute-Garonne	Occitanie
Rodez AF	Ligue 2	2	Rodez	Aveyron	Occitanie
Rodez AF (women)	Seconde Ligue	2	Rodez	Aveyron	Occitanie
SO Romorantin	National 2	4	Romorantin-Lanthenay	Loir-et-Cher	Centre-Val de Loire
FC Rouen	National	3	Rouen	Seine-Maritime	Normandy
FC Rouen (women)	Féminine Régional 1	3	Rouen	Seine-Maritime	Normandy
US Roye-Noyon	Régional 1	6	Roye	Somme	Hauts-de-France
GFA Rumilly-Vallières	National 2	4	Rumilly	Haute-Savoie	Auvergne-Rhône-Alpes

=== S ===
Club	Division	Level	Location	Department	Region
Sablé FC	National 3	5	Sablé-sur-Sarthe	Sarthe	Pays de la Loire
Sainte-Geneviève Sports	National 2	4	Sainte-Geneviève-des-Bois	Essonne	Île-de-France
Saint-Alban Aucamville FC	Régional 1	6	Saint-Alban	Haute-Garonne	Occitanie
AS Saint-Amandoise	Régional 1	6	Saint-Amand-Montrond	Cher	Centre-Val de Loire
Saint-Avertin Sports	District 3	11	Saint-Avertin	Indre-et-Loire	Centre-Val de Loire
Saint-Colomban Sportive Locminé	National 3	5	Locminé	Morbihan	Brittany
SR Saint-Dié	Régional 3	8	Saint-Dié-des-Vosges	Vosges	Grand Est
AS Saint-Étienne	Ligue 1	2	Saint-Étienne	Loire	Auvergne-Rhône-Alpes
AS Saint-Étienne (women)	Première Ligue	1	Saint-Étienne	Loire	Auvergne-Rhône-Alpes
US Saint-Georges / Les Ancizes	Régional 3	8	Saint-Georges-de-Mons	Puy-de-Dôme	Auvergne-Rhône-Alpes
Entente Sannois Saint-Gratien	National 2	4	Saint-Gratien	Val-d'Oise	Île-de-France
FCO Saint-Jean-de-la-Ruelle	Départmental 1	9	Saint-Jean-de-la-Ruelle	Loiret	Centre-Val de Loire
FC Saint-Jean-le-Blanc	National 3	5	Saint-Jean-le-Blanc	Loiret	Centre-Val de Loire
FC Saint-Louis Neuweg	National 3	5	Saint-Louis	European Collectivity of Alsace	Grand Est
FC Saint-Lô Manche	National 3	5	Saint-Lô	Manche	Normandy
US Saint-Malo	National 2	4	Saint-Malo	Ille-et-Vilaine	Brittany
FR Saint Marcel	Régional 2	7	Saint-Marcel	Saône-et-Loire	Bourgogne-Franche-Comté
US Lusitanos Saint-Maur	National 2	4	Saint-Maur-des-Fossés	Val-de-Marne	Île-de-France
US Saint-Omer	National 3	5	Saint-Omer	Pas-de-Calais	Hauts-de-France
US Saint-Pierre-des-Corps	District 1	9	Saint-Pierre-des-Corps	Indre-et-Loire	Centre-Val de Loire
AS Saint-Priest	National 2	4	Saint-Priest	Lyon Metropolis	Auvergne-Rhône-Alpes
Saint-Pryvé Saint-Hilaire FC	National 2	4	Saint-Pryvé-Saint-Mesmin	Loiret	Centre-Val de Loire
Olympique Saint-Quentin	National 2	4	Saint-Quentin	Aisne	Hauts-de-France
USM Saran	National 3	5	Saran	Loiret	Centre-Val de Loire
Sarreguemines FC	Régional 1	6	Sarreguemines	Moselle	Grand Est
US Sarre-Union	National 3	5	Sarre-Union	European Collectivity of Alsace	Grand Est
Olympique Saumur FC	National 2	4	Saumur	Maine-et-Loire	Pays de la Loire
SC Schiltigheim	National 3	5	Schiltigheim	European Collectivity of Alsace	Grand Est
CS Sedan Ardennes	National	3	Sedan	Ardennes	Grand Est
SC Sélestat	Régional 3	8	Sélestat	European Collectivity of Alsace	Grand Est
US Sénart-Moissy	Régional 1	6	Moissy-Cramayel	Seine-et-Marne	Île-de-France
FC Sens	Régional 1	6	Sens	Yonne	Bourgogne-Franche-Comté
FC Sète 34	National 3	5	Sète	Hérault	Occitanie
FC Sochaux-Montbéliard	National 1	2	Montbéliard	Doubs	Bourgogne-Franche-Comté
ASJ Soyaux	Féminine Régional 1	4	Soyaux	Charente	Nouvelle-Aquitaine
Stade Français	District 6	14	Vaucresson	Hauts-de-Seine	Île-de-France
AS Strasbourg	Régional 3	8	Strasbourg	European Collectivity of Alsace	Grand Est
ASPV Strasbourg	Régional 1	6	Strasbourg	European Collectivity of Alsace	Grand Est
FCO Strasbourg Koenigshoffen 06	Régional 2	7	Strasbourg	European Collectivity of Alsace	Grand Est
RC Strasbourg Alsace	Ligue 1	1	Strasbourg	European Collectivity of Alsace	Grand Est
Sud Nivernais Imphy Decize	Régional 1	6	Decize	Nièvre	Bourgogne-Franche-Comté
CSM Sully-sur-Loire	Régional 2	7	Sully-sur-Loire	Loiret	Centre-Val de Loire

=== T ===
Club	Division	Level	Location	Department	Region
AS Taissy	Régional 3	8	Taissy	Marne	Grand Est
Tarbes Pyrénées Football	Régional 1	6	Tarbes	Hautes-Pyrénées	Occitanie
ES Thaon	National 3	5	Thaon-les-Vosges	Vosges	Grand Est
SA Thiers	Régional 1	6	Thiers	Puy-de-Dôme	Auvergne-Rhône-Alpes
Thionville FC	Régional 2	7	Thionville	Moselle	Grand Est
Thonon Evian Grand Genève F.C.	National 2	4	Thonon-les-Bains	Haute Savoie	Auvergne-Rhône-Alpes
Thouars Foot 79	Régional 1	6	Thouars	Deux-Sèvres	Nouvelle-Aquitaine
US Torcy	Régional 1	6	Torcy	Seine-et-Marne	Île-de-France
Sporting Club Toulon	National 2	4	Toulon	Var	Provence-Alpes-Côte d'Azur
Toulouse FC	Ligue 1	1	Toulouse	Haute-Garonne	Occitanie
Toulouse FC (women)	Féminine Régional 1	3	Toulouse	Haute-Garonne	Occitanie
US Tourcoing FC	Régional 1	6	Tourcoing	Nord	Hauts-de-France
AS Tournefeuille	Régional 1	6	Tournefeuille	Haute-Garonne	Occitanie
CCSP Tours	Régional 2	7	Tours	Indre-et-Loire	Centre-Val de Loire
Tours FC	National 3	5	Tours	Indre-et-Loire	Centre-Val de Loire
Trélissac-Antonne Périgord FC	National 2	4	Trélissac	Dordogne	Nouvelle-Aquitaine
Trinité Sport Football Club	District 1	8	La Trinité, Alpes-Maritimes	Alpes-Maritimes	Provence-Alpes-Côte d'Azur
ES Troyes AC	Ligue 2	2	Troyes	Aube	Grand Est

=== V ===
Club	Division	Level	Location	Department	Region
Olympique de Valence	Régional 1	6	Valence	Drôme	Auvergne-Rhône-Alpes
Valenciennes FC	Ligue 2	2	Valenciennes	Nord	Hauts-de-France
AS Valentigney	Départmental 3	11	Valentigney	Doubs	Bourgogne-Franche-Comté
UA Valettoise	Régional 2	7	La Valette-du-Var	Var	Provence-Alpes-Côte d'Azur
FC Vaulx-en-Velin	National 3	5	Vaulx-en-Velin	Lyon Metropolis	Auvergne-Rhône-Alpes
Velay FC	National 3	5	Blanzac, Polignac, Saint-Paulien	Haute-Loire	Auvergne-Rhône-Alpes
FC Vendenheim	Division 2 Féminine	2	Vendenheim	Bas-Rhin	Grand Est
Vénissieux FC	Régional 1	6	Vénissieux	Lyon Metropolis	Auvergne-Rhône-Alpes
FC Versailles	National	3	Versailles	Yvelines	Île-de-France
USSA Vertou	National 3	5	Vertou	Loire-Atlantique	Pays de la Loire
FC Vesoul	Régional 1	6	Vesoul	Haute-Saône	Bourgogne-Franche-Comté
RC Vichy	Régional 1	6	Vichy	Allier	Auvergne-Rhône-Alpes
Vierzon FC	National 2	4	Vierzon	Cher	Centre-Val de Loire
FC Villefranche Beaujolais	National	3	Villefranche-sur-Saône	Rhône	Auvergne-Rhône-Alpes
Villemomble Sports	Régional 1	6	Villemomble	Seine-Saint-Denis	Île-de-France
Vineuil SF	Régional 1	6	Vineuil	Loir-et-Cher	Centre-Val de Loire
AF Virois	National 2	4	Vire Normandie	Calvados	Normandy
ES Viry-Châtillon	Régional 1	6	Viry-Châtillon	Essonne	Île-de-France
AS Vitré	National 3	5	Vitré	Ille-et-Vilaine	Brittany

=== W ===
Club	Division	Level	Location	Department	Region
Wasquehal Football	National 2	4	Wasquehal	Nord	Hauts-de-France

=== Y ===
Club	Division	Level	Location	Department	Region
FF Yzeure Allier Auvergne	Division 2 Féminine	2	Yzeure	Allier	Auvergne-Rhône-Alpes
