= 2020–21 Coupe de France preliminary rounds, Méditerranée =

French football competition

The 2020–21 Coupe de France preliminary rounds, Méditerranée was the qualifying competition to decide which teams from the leagues of the Méditerranée region of France took part in the main competition from the seventh round.

A total of four teams qualified from the Méditerranée Preliminary rounds. In 2019–20, Athlético Marseille progressed furthest in the main competition, reaching the round of 32 before losing to Rennes 0–2.

== Schedule ==
The number of teams entering from the region, combined with the changes to the number of teams qualifying for the seventh round, meant a preliminary round was required for the 96 teams from District 2 and below, to be played on 23 August 2020. Remaining District 2, District 1 and Régional 2 teams entered at the first round stage on 30 August 2020. Teams from Régional 1 entered at the second round stage on 6 September 2020.

The third round draw, which saw the teams from Championnat National 3 enter, took place on 9 September 2020. The fourth round draw, which saw the teams from Championnat National 2 enter, took place on 24 September 2020. The fifth round draw was made on 8 October 2020. The sixth round draw was made on 22 October 2020.

=== Preliminary round ===
These matches were played on 22, 23 and 26 August 2020.

Preliminary round results: Méditerranée
| Tie no | Home team (tier) | Score | Away team (tier) |
|---|---|---|---|
| 1. | FC Vidauban (10) | 2–2 (3–5 p) | JS Berthe (10) |
| 2. | JS Istréenne (10) | 0–3 (Note: Tie won by means of forfeit.) | FC Fuveau Provence (10) |
| 3. | ES Salin-de-Giraud (10) | 3–1 | Saint-Henri FC (9) |
| 4. | US Velauxienne (10) | 0–1 | SC Saint-Cannat (10) |
| 5. | US Tramways Marseille (10) | 7–5 | US 1er Canton Marseille (9) |
| 6. | Phocea Club Marseille (10) | 4–0 | AS Sainte-Marguerite (10) |
| 7. | Étoile Huveaune (9) | 0–3 | SC Cayolle (9) |
| 8. | CA Croix Sainte (10) | 0–7 | US Miramas (10) |
| 9. | US Pélican (10) | 3–2 | AS Nord Aix (10) |
| 10. | Aix Université CF (10) | 3–0 | US Puyricard (9) |
| 11. | AS Dauphin (10) | 0–8 | US Farenque (9) |
| 12. | SCO Sainte-Marguerite (11) | 0–4 (Note: The match was originally scheduled for 23 August 2020, but was not played because the changing rooms for players and referees were not opened, and therefore not disinfected per protocols. The Ligue Méditerranée de Football ruled that the match should be replayed on 26 August 2020.) | AS Timone (10) |
| 13. | FO Ventabren (10) | 3–3 (3–4 p) | AS Rognac (10) |
| 14. | FC Revestois (10) | 6–1 | AS Mar Vivo (9) |
| 15. | Olympique Salernois (10) | 2–2 (3–4 p) | Entente Pivotte Serinette (11) |
| 16. | ES Lorguaise (10) | 2–3 | FC Rocbaron (9) |
| 17. | US La Cadière (9) | 1–0 | FA Fréjusienne (10) |
| 18. | JS Beaussetanne (10) | 3–0 | SC Tourvain (11) |
| 19. | RC La Baie (10) | 1–1 (2–4 p) | FC Seynois (9) |
| 20. | ASPTT Hyères (10) | 0–0 (11–10 p) | FC Grimaud (9) |
| 21. | AS Brignoles (10) | 2–2 (5–6 p) | AS Arcoise (9) |
| 22. | ES Cuges (10) | 0–2 | US Sanary (10) |
| 23. | FC Saint-Mitre-les-Remparts (10) | 2–2 (4–3 p) | FC Saint-Victoret (10) |
| 24. | ES Sud Luberon (10) | 2–0 | ES Pierredon Mouriès (10) |
| 25. | Tarascon SC (10) | 1–2 | FC Avignon Ouest (9) |
| 26. | RCB Bollène (9) | 2–2 (7–6 p) | ARC Cavaillon (9) |
| 27. | US Caderousse (10) | 1–2 | FC Carpentras (9) |
| 28. | SC Althen-des-Paluds (9) | 3–3 (3–4 p) | FC Aureille (10) |
| 29. | ES Contoise (10) | 3–1 | US Cannes Bocca Olympique (10) |
| 30. | OC Blausasc (10) | 6–3 | FC Cannes Ranguin (11) |
| 31. | ES Villeneuve-Loubet (10) | 3–1 | Saint-Paul-la-Colle OC (10) |
| 32. | Drap Football (9) | 4–5 | FC Euro African (11) |
| 33. | AO Tourrette-Levens (10) | 6–2 | AS Traminots Alpes Maritimes (10) |
| 34. | ASPTT Nice (11) | 1–3 | US Biot (10) |
| 35. | Gazélec Sport Nice (12) | 1–2 | CAS Eaux Nice (13) |
| 36. | FC Vignères (10) | 0–1 | FC Cheval Blanc (9) |
| 37. | Olympique Eyraguais (10) | 2–2 (4–3 p) | Avenir Club Avignonnais (9) |
| 38. | FC Saint-Rémy (10) | 1–2 | SC Saint-Martinois (10) |
| 39. | SO Velleronnais (9) | 2–0 | Calavon FC (9) |
| 40. | Dentelles FC (9) | 6–1 | US Saint-Saturnin-lès-Avignon (10) |
| 41. | Avenir Goult Roussillon (10) | 1–0 | Espérance Sorguaise (9) |
| 42. | Réveil Grozeau Malaucène (10) | 3–3 (5–3 p) | Bollène Foot (11) |
| 43. | US Planaise (9) | – (Note: The match was originally played on 23 August 2020, but was abandoned after players from both sides were seriously injured in an accidental collision. The Ligue Méditerranée de Football ruled that the match should be replayed on 26 August 2020. The replayed game was also abandoned, with US Planaise leading 2–1, when players from both sides were involved in a lengthy argument. The Ligue Méditerranée de Football excluded both sides from the competition.) | AS Piolenc (9) |
| 44. | Olympique Montelais (10) | 1–2 | Orange FC (10) |
| 45. | US Thoroise (11) | 1–4 | SC Mondragon (9) |
| 46. | EJGC Graveson (10) | 1–2 | Boxeland Club Islois (9) |
| 47. | Entente Saint-Jean-du-Grès (10) | 8–4 | US Eygalières (9) |
| 48. | Étoile Menton (9) | 1–0 (Note: Tie reversed from original draw.) | ES Saint-André (10) |

=== First round ===
These matches were played on 30 August 2020, with one postponed to 2 September 2020. Tiers are not yet known for all district sides. Unknown tiers indicated with (*)

First round results: Méditerranée
| Tie no | Home team (tier) | Score | Away team (tier) |
|---|---|---|---|
| 1. | FC Fuveau Provence (10) | 2–3 | USPEG Marseille (9) |
| 2. | AS Timone (10) | 0–4 | JO Saint-Gabriel (9) |
| 3. | US Miramas (10) | 5–0 | US Venelles (8) |
| 4. | SC Montredon Bonneveine (8) | 1–2 | JS Pennes Mirabeau (8) |
| 5. | ASCJ Félix Pyat (9) | 1–2 | AS Bouc Bel Air (7) |
| 6. | Pays d'Aix FC (9) | 4–1 | US Pélican (10) |
| 7. | AAS Val Saint-André (9) | 2–1 | US Tramways Marseille (10) |
| 8. | Minots de Marseille (7) | 1–0 | FC Septèmes (7) |
| 9. | ES Salin-de-Giraud (10) | 0–2 | Stade Maillanais (7) |
| 10. | SC Saint-Martinois (10) | 1–2 | ES Sud Luberon (10) |
| 11. | FC Saint-Mitre-les-Remparts (10) | 1–7 | AC Arlésien (7) |
| 12. | AS Rognac (10) | 1–1 (2–4 p) | AS Simiane-Collongue (8) |
| 13. | FC Revestois (10) | 1–1 (5–6 p) | US Farenque (9) |
| 14. | FC Euro African (11) | 1–1 (4–5 p) | ES des Baous (8) |
| 15. | FC Ramatuelle (7) | 2–1 | FCUS Tropézienne (7) |
| 16. | UA Valettoise (7) | 0–2 | AS Fontonne Antibes (7) |
| 17. | Phocea Club Marseille (10) | 1–3 | SC Saint-Cannat (10) |
| 18. | ES Milloise (8) | 2–0 | Gardanne Biver FC (7) |
| 19. | FC Chateauneuf-les-Martigues (9) | 0–3 | Burel FC (8) |
| 20. | CA Peymeinade (8) | 0–4 | US Cap d'Ail (7) |
| 21. | Entente Saint-Sylvestre Nice Nord (8) | 2–3 | AS Moulins (8) |
| 22. | AO Tourrette-Levens (10) | 0–7 | AS Roquebrune-Cap-Martin (8) |
| 23. | OC Blausasc (10) | 3–0 | ES Contoise (10) |
| 24. | Stade Laurentin (8) | 1–1 (3–4 p) | AS Roquefort (9) |
| 25. | US Biot (10) | 0–4 | FC Beausoleil (8) |
| 26. | CAS Eaux Nice (13) | 1–3 | FC Mougins Côte d'Azur (8) |
| 27. | US Pegomas (7) | 1–1 (4–2 p) (Note: Tie reversed from original draw.) | FC Carros (8) |
| 28. | CJ Antibes (8) | 1–1 (1–4 p) | SC Mouans-Sartoux (7) |
| 29. | Étoile Menton (9) | 0–2 | AS Vence (7) |
| 30. | Aix Université CF (10) | 0–4 | Luynes Sports (7) |
| 31. | CA Plan-de-Cuques (8) | 1–2 | AC Port-de-Bouc (8) |
| 32. | SC Cayolle (9) | 7–1 | ES La Ciotat (7) |
| 33. | AS Martigues Sud (8) | 0–2 | AS Mazargues (8) |
| 34. | AS Arcoise (9) | 1–3 | ES Villeneuve-Loubet (10) |
| 35. | Entente Pivotte Serinette (11) | 0–6 | Gardia Club (7) |
| 36. | US Avignonnaise (8) | 0–2 | AC Le Pontet-Vedène (7) |
| 37. | Orange FC (10) | void (Note: Match void due to US Planaise and AS Piolenc both being removed from the competition. Orange FC receive a bye to the second round.) | winner match 43 |
| 38. | FC Cheval Blanc (9) | 1–3 | Entente Saint-Jean-du-Grès (10) |
| 39. | FC Aureille (10) | 1–0 | FA Châteaurenard (9) |
| 40. | JS Visannaise (8) | 2–6 | Olympic Barbentane (7) |
| 41. | AS Camaretois (8) | 3–0 | Étoile d'Aubune (9) |
| 42. | Réveil Grozeau Malaucène (10) | 0–1 | FA Val Durance (7) |
| 43. | Espérance Gordienne (9) | 2–3 | RC Provence (8) |
| 44. | ES Boulbon (8) | 3–0 | Espérance Pernoise (7) |
| 45. | EP Manosque (8) | 2–1 | SC Vinonnais (8) |
| 46. | AFC Sainte-Tulle-Pierrevert (7) | 2–3 | US Veynes-Serres (7) |
| 47. | FC Céreste-Reillanne (8) | 2–3 | US Canton Riezois (8) |
| 48. | ES Banon (8) | 0–2 | Olympique Novais (7) |
| 49. | FC Sisteron (8) | 3–0 | Laragne Sports (8) |
| 50. | FC Avignon Ouest (9) | 4–0 | Avenir Goult Roussillon (10) |
| 51. | FC Carpentras (9) | 3–1 | ACS Morières (9) |
| 52. | RCB Bollène (9) | 1–4 | US Autre Provence (8) |
| 53. | AS Saint-Cyr (8) | 1–1 (2–4 p) | Entente ASPTT Hospitaliers Toulon (9) |
| 54. | JS Berthe (10) | 2–2 (3–2 p) | SO Londais (7) |
| 55. | US Sanary (10) | 0–2 | SC Cogolin (8) |
| 56. | CA Cannetois (8) | 1–0 | US La Cadière (9) |
| 57. | CA Roquebrunois (9) | 1–2 | US Cuers-Pierrefeu (7) |
| 58. | JS Beaussetanne (10) | 0–2 | Bormes Mimosas Sport (9) |
| 59. | SC Draguignan (8) | 4–3 | FC Seynois (9) |
| 60. | ASPTT Hyères (10) | 1–6 | Olympique Saint-Maximinois (9) |
| 61. | SC Nansais (9) | 3–1 | ES Solliès-Farlède (8) |
| 62. | SO Lavandou (8) | 0–1 | US Pradet (8) |
| 63. | FC Rocbaron (9) | 2–0 | AS Estérel (8) |
| 64. | Olympique Eyraguais (10) | 0–4 | SC Jonquières (7) |
| 65. | EM Angloise (7) | 3–1 | US Pontet Grand Avignon 84 (7) |
| 66. | Boxeland Club Islois (9) | 4–2 | SC Mondragon (9) |
| 67. | SO Velleronnais (9) | 1–1 (5–4 p) | Dentelles FC (9) |
| 68. | CA Digne 04 (8) | 1–1 (4–1 p) | Gap Foot 05 (8) |

=== Second round ===
These matches were played on 5 and 6 September 2020.

Second round results: Méditerranée
| Tie no | Home team (tier) | Score | Away team (tier) |
|---|---|---|---|
| 1. | FC Sisteron (8) | 3–2 | CA Digne 04 (8) |
| 2. | US Canton Riezois (8) | 0–1 | US Veynes-Serres (7) |
| 3. | FC Rocbaron (9) | – (Note: Match did not take place due to a fire being started at the edge of the ground by supporters' pyrotechnics. FC Rocbaron penalised. AS Maximoise qualify.) | AS Maximoise (6) |
| 4. | Bormes Mimosas Sport (9) | 1–1 (7–8 p) | CA Cannetois (8) |
| 5. | Gardia Club (7) | 3–1 | US Carqueiranne-La Crau (6) |
| 6. | US Pradet (8) | 1–5 | Six-Fours Le Brusc FC (6) |
| 7. | SC Cogolin (8) | 0–2 | ES Saint-Zacharie (6) |
| 8. | SC Draguignan (8) | 3–2 | FC Ramatuelle (7) |
| 9. | JS Berthe (10) | 0–2 | Entente ASPTT Hospitaliers Toulon (9) |
| 10. | FC Aureille (10) | 0–3 | Olympique Novais (7) |
| 11. | RC Provence (8) | 2–4 | FA Val Durance (7) |
| 12. | FC Avignon Ouest (9) | 2–5 | Olympic Barbentane (7) |
| 13. | SC Jonquières (7) | 3–0 | AS Camaretois (8) |
| 14. | FC Carpentras (9) | 0–3 | EM Angloise (7) |
| 15. | Boxeland Club Islois (9) | 2–1 | SO Velleronnais (9) |
| 16. | AC Le Pontet-Vedène (7) | 2–3 | SC Courthézon (6) |
| 17. | ES Sud Luberon (10) | 1–2 | ES Boulbon (8) |
| 18. | Entente Saint-Jean-du-Grès (10) | 3–2 | US Autre Provence (8) |
| 19. | Orange FC (10) | 3–2 | US Farenque (9) |
| 20. | Stade Maillanais (7) | 9–0 | EP Manosque (8) |
| 21. | FC Beausoleil (8) | 1–4 | AS Cagnes-Le Cros (6) |
| 22. | AS Fontonne Antibes (7) | 3–0 | RO Menton (6) |
| 23. | OC Blausasc (10) | 1–3 | AS Vence (7) |
| 24. | AS Roquefort (9) | 2–2 (4–2 p) | US Pegomas (7) |
| 25. | FC Mougins Côte d'Azur (8) | 2–2 (4–3 p) | US Cap d'Ail (7) |
| 26. | AS Roquebrune-Cap-Martin (8) | 3–2 | SC Mouans-Sartoux (7) |
| 27. | ES Villeneuve-Loubet (10) | 1–2 | AS Moulins (8) |
| 28. | ES des Baous (8) | 3–4 | US Cuers-Pierrefeu (7) |
| 29. | AAS Val Saint-André (9) | 0–1 | Salon Bel Air (6) |
| 30. | ES Milloise (8) | 0–1 | Berre SC (6) |
| 31. | Burel FC (8) | 2–5 | Stade Marseillais UC (6) |
| 32. | SC Saint-Cannat (10) | 3–2 | JO Saint-Gabriel (9) |
| 33. | Pays d'Aix FC (9) | 0–0 (4–5 p) | EUGA Ardziv (6) |
| 34. | JS Pennes Mirabeau (8) | 0–1 | AS Gémenos (6) |
| 35. | AS Simiane-Collongue (8) | 1–1 (3–4 p) | AS Bouc Bel Air (7) |
| 36. | Luynes Sports (7) | 0–1 | ES Fosséenne (6) |
| 37. | US Miramas (10) | 1–3 | SC Cayolle (9) |
| 38. | AC Port-de-Bouc (8) | 1–0 | Minots de Marseille (7) |
| 39. | USPEG Marseille (9) | 1–6 | AC Arlésien (7) |
| 40. | AS Mazargues (8) | 0–6 | Carnoux FC (6) |
| 41. | Olympique Saint-Maximinois (9) | 1–1 (3–4 p) | SC Nansais (9) |

=== Third round ===
These matches were played on 19 and 20 September 2020, with one postponed to 23 September 2020 and one to 30 September 2020.

Third round results: Méditerranée
| Tie no | Home team (tier) | Score | Away team (tier) |
|---|---|---|---|
| 1. | Orange FC (10) | 1–0 | Olympic Barbentane (7) |
| 2. | SC Nansais (9) | 0–2 | AS Cannes (5) |
| 3. | SC Saint-Cannat (10) | 0–4 | US Cuers-Pierrefeu (7) |
| 4. | Entente ASPTT Hospitaliers Toulon (9) | 1–2 | CA Cannetois (8) |
| 5. | AS Cagnes-Le Cros (6) | 2–0 | Villefranche Saint-Jean Beaulieu FC (5) |
| 6. | AS Maximoise (6) | 2–1 | AS Fontonne Antibes (7) |
| 7. | AS Bouc Bel Air (7) | 0–0 (8–9 p) | Six-Fours Le Brusc FC (6) |
| 8. | AS Moulins (8) | 2–2 (7–6 p) | AS Roquefort (9) |
| 9. | AS Gémenos (6) | 1–2 (Note: Match abandoned after 51 minutes due to waterlogged pitch. Replayed on 30 September.) | US Mandelieu-La Napoule (5) |
| 10. | FC Mougins Côte d'Azur (8) | 1–3 | ES Saint-Zacharie (6) |
| 11. | FA Val Durance (7) | 2–2 (3–4 p) | FC Rousset Sainte Victoire (5) |
| 12. | AS Roquebrune-Cap-Martin (8) | 2–4 | Gardia Club (7) |
| 13. | SC Draguignan (8) | 0–2 | Carnoux FC (6) |
| 14. | Entente Saint-Jean-du-Grès (10) | 3–0 | AC Port-de-Bouc (8) |
| 15. | Boxeland Club Islois (9) | 0–8 | Athlético Marseille (5) |
| 16. | ES Fosséenne (6) | 3–0 | US Veynes-Serres (7) |
| 17. | US Marseille Endoume (6) | 0–0 (1–3 p) | FC Istres (5) |
| 18. | SC Jonquières (7) | 5–0 | FC Sisteron (8) |
| 19. | EM Angloise (7) | 3–1 | EUGA Ardziv (6) |
| 20. | SC Cayolle (9) | 0–4 | Stade Maillanais (7) |
| 21. | AC Arlésien (7) | 1–2 | Berre SC (6) |
| 22. | SC Courthézon (6) | 1–4 | Salon Bel Air (6) |
| 23. | Olympique Novais (7) | 1–2 | FC Côte Bleue (5) |
| 24. | ES Boulbon (8) | 1–4 | Stade Marseillais UC (6) |
| 25. | AS Vence (7) | 0–4 | ES Cannet Rocheville (5) |

=== Fourth round ===
These matches were played on 3 and 4 October 2020.

Fourth round results: Méditerranée
| Tie no | Home team (tier) | Score | Away team (tier) |
|---|---|---|---|
| 1. | Carnoux FC (6) | 1–0 | AS Cagnes-Le Cros (6) |
| 2. | Stade Marseillais UC (6) | 3–1 | Marignane Gignac FC (4) |
| 3. | US Cuers-Pierrefeu (7) | 0–4 | Sporting Club Toulon (4) |
| 4. | FC Istres (5) | 1–3 | AS Maximoise (6) |
| 5. | Orange FC (10) | – (Note: Match abandoned after 80 minutes, with the scoreline 0–3, when a linesman was hit by a projectile thrown from the stands. Orange FC penalised. Stade Maillanais qualify.) | Stade Maillanais (7) |
| 6. | ES Cannet Rocheville (5) | 1–0 (Note: Match finished 1–0, but a challenge was lodged by Hyères FC alleging that the referee did not immediately show a red card to an ES Cannet Rocheville player who had received two yellow cards. The challenge was dismissed on a technicality.) | Hyères FC (4) |
| 7. | Entente Saint-Jean-du-Grès (10) | 1–3 | Athlético Marseille (5) |
| 8. | EM Angloise (7) | 0–1 | FC Côte Bleue (5) |
| 9. | CA Cannetois (8) | 1–4 | RC Grasse (4) |
| 10. | Six-Fours Le Brusc FC (6) | 0–3 | FC Martigues (4) |
| 11. | Salon Bel Air (6) | 0–0 (3–5 p) | Gardia Club (7) |
| 12. | Berre SC (6) | 2–1 | US Mandelieu-La Napoule (5) |
| 13. | ES Saint-Zacharie (6) | 2–1 | FC Rousset Sainte Victoire (5) |
| 14. | ES Fosséenne (6) | 0–0 (4–3 p) | Étoile Fréjus Saint-Raphaël (4) |
| 15. | SC Jonquières (7) | 0–4 | Aubagne FC (4) |
| 16. | AS Moulins (8) | 2–4 | AS Cannes (5) |

=== Fifth round ===
These matches were played on 17 and 18 October 2020.

Fifth round results: Méditerranée
| Tie no | Home team (tier) | Score | Away team (tier) |
|---|---|---|---|
| 1. | Stade Maillanais (7) | 0–1 | FC Martigues (4) |
| 2. | Gardia Club (7) | 1–0 | ES Cannet Rocheville (5) |
| 3. | AS Maximoise (6) | 3–1 | RC Grasse (4) |
| 4. | Stade Marseillais UC (6) | 2–2 (5–6 p) | Berre SC (6) |
| 5. | Athlético Marseille (5) | 3–1 | AS Cannes (5) |
| 6. | Carnoux FC (6) | 1–0 | Sporting Club Toulon (4) |
| 7. | ES Saint-Zacharie (6) | 0–0 (4–2 p) | ES Fosséenne (6) |
| 8. | Aubagne FC (4) | 1–0 | FC Côte Bleue (5) |

=== Sixth round ===
These matches were played on 31 January 2021.

Sixth round results: Méditerranée
| Tie no | Home team (tier) | Score | Away team (tier) |
|---|---|---|---|
| 1. | Gardia Club (7) | 1–8 | ES Saint-Zacharie (6) |
| 2. | Carnoux FC (6) | 2–3 | Athlético Marseille (5) |
| 3. | AS Maximoise (6) | 1–0 | FC Martigues (4) |
| 4. | Berre SC (6) | 0–3 | Aubagne FC (4) |
