= 2018–19 Coupe de France preliminary rounds, Méditerranée =

The 2018–19 Coupe de France preliminary rounds, Méditerranée was the qualifying competition to decide which teams from the leagues of the Méditerranée region of France took part in the main competition from the seventh round.

== First round ==
These matches were played on 25 and 26 August 2018.

First round results: Méditerranée
Tie no	Home team (tier)	Score	Away team (tier)
1.	FC Seynois (8)	1–2	Six-Fours Le Brusc FC (7)
2.	Pays d'Aix FC (9)	4–0	SS St Chamas (10)
3.	ES Cuges (10)	1–4	FC Chateauneuf-les-Martigues (9)
4.	AS St Cyr (9)	1–1 (4–2 p)	US La Cadière (10)
5.	SO Londais (8)	4–0	AS Mar Vivo (9)
6.	FC Grimaud (9)	1–4	ES Solliès-Farlède (9)
7.	Drap Football (10)	2–2 (3–1 p)	Trinité Sport Football Club (8)
8.	FC Septèmes (8)	1–2	Gardanne Biver Football Club (7)
9.	AS Helvétique (9)	1–0 (a.e.t.)	FC Algerien (10)
10.	FC La Ciotat-Ceyreste (10)	3–4	AS Martigues Sud (7)
11.	USA St Just (10)	1–3	JS Pennes Mirabeau (9)
12.	Luynes Sports (7)	1–2	AC Port-de-Bouc (7)
13.	US Venelles (9)	0–1 (Note: CA Gombertois penalised for fielding a suspended player. US Venelles qualify. Original scoreline 0–1.)	CA Gombertois (7)
14.	ES Milloise (8)	0–0 (2–3 p)	AAS Val St André (9)
15.	AS Simiane-Collongue (9)	6–1	SC St Cannat (10)
16.	ES Vitrolles (10)	0–9	Étoile Huveaune (8)
17.	US St Mandrier (8)	2–1	SC Cogolin (8)
18.	SC Mondragon (10)	3–5	Olympique Novais (8)
19.	Avenir Goult Roussillon (12)	2–0	Réveil Grozeau (10)
20.	FC Belgentier (10)	0–3 (Note: Tie won by forfeit.)	AS Estérel (8)
21.	RC La Baie (11)	0–1	FC Vidauban (9)
22.	US Sanary (9)	1–5	US Cuers-Pierrefeu (8)
23.	US Cannes Bocca Olympique (10)	0–6	FC Mougins Côte d'Azur (8)
24.	Olympique Vaisonnais (10)	2–0	SC Althen-des-Paluds (10)
25.	US Touraine (9)	2–2 (4–5 p)	Étoile d'Aubune (9)
26.	SC Nansais (9)	3–2	US Pignans (10)
27.	FC Pays de Fayence (9)	4–1	FC Rocbaron (9)
28.	Étoile Menton (10)	1–5	ES Villeneuve-Loubet (10)
29.	US Biot (10)	4–4 (4–2 p)	CA Peymeinade (9)
30.	SO Roquettan (11)	2–1	St Paul CO Collois (10)
31.	Salon Nord (11)	1–2	St Henri FC (10)
32.	JO St Gabriel (9)	3–0	FC St Victoret (10)
33.	FCUS Tropézienne (8)	4–0	ES Lorguaise (9)
34.	Gardia Club (8)	1–0	SO Lavandou (7)
35.	Olympique Suquetan Cannes Croisette (11)	1–7	AS Vence (7)
36.	AS Roquebrune-Cap-Martin (9)	3–2 (a.e.t.)	ES Contoise (10)
37.	FC Fuveau Provence (10)	3–1	SC St Martinois (10)
38.	AS Coudoux (10)	3–1 (Note: Match abandoned, with the scoreline 3–1, due to pitch invasions. FO Ventabren penalised. AS Coudoux qualify.)	FO Ventabren (10)
39.	FA Châteaurenard (8)	5–1	JS Visannaise (9)
40.	SC Rognonas (10)	1–4	Espérance Sorguaise (8)
41.	US Farenque (9)	2–4	SC Montredon Bonneveine (9)
42.	Olympique Mallemortais (9)	1–2	FC Rognes (9)
43.	USC Minots du Panier (8)	3–2	ASCJ Félix Pyat (9)
44.	USPEG Marseille (10)	6–1	AS Ste Marguerite (11)
45.	JS St Julien (9)	3–2	Burel FC (9)
46.	JS Istréenne (10)	0–0 (7–8 p)	CA Croix Sainte (10)
47.	Dentelles FC (9)	3–2 (a.e.t.)	FC Cheval Blanc (10)
48.	FC Bonnieux (11)	2–3 (a.e.t.)	Olympique Montelais (9)
49.	US Valreas (9)	4–2	USR Pertuis (9)
50.	ACS Morières (10)	2–0	AS Violès (9)
51.	ARC Cavaillon (8)	0–2 (a.e.t.)	FC Carpentras (7)
52.	AC Vedene (8)	0–0 (5–6 p)	Olympic Barbentane (7)
53.	Espérance Gordienne (10)	3–1	AS Piolençoise (10)
54.	Calavon FC (8)	1–4	SC Montfavet (8)
55.	US Thoroise (10)	0–13	SC Gadagnien (8)
56.	ES Boulbon (8)	1–4	SC Jonquières (8)
57.	US Veynes-Serres (7)	2–0	US Méenne (9)
58.	Laragne Sports (9)	2–4	CA Digne 04 (7)
59.	US Canton Riezois (8)	2–1	SC Vinon Durance (8)
60.	EJGC Graveson (9)	0–1 (a.e.t.)	Avenir Club Avignonnais (9)
61.	US Planaise (10)	2–4	EM Angloise (9)
62.	Caumont FC (10)	4–2	FC Vignères (10)
63.	AS Rasteau (10)	0–6	US Entraigues (8)
64.	Ventoux Sud FC (9)	6–0 (Note: Tie switched at the request of both clubs.)	Football Cadenet Luberon (11)
65.	ES Haute Siagne (11)	4–3	FC Beausoleil (9)
66.	AS Roquefort (9)	2–2 (2–4 p)	FC Carros (8)
67.	OC Blausasc (10)	2–3	AS Moulins (8)
68.	JS Puy-Ste Réparade (11)	0–5	FC St Mitre-les-Remparts (9)
69.	FC Golfe-Juan (10)	0–3	CJ Antibes (8)
70.	US Eygalières (9)	3–3 (4–3 p)	US Autre Provence (8)
71.	AFC Ste Tulle-Pierrevert (8)	7–0	US Aiglun (8)
72.	FC Ramatuelle (7)	0–3	UA Valettoise (7)
73.	AS Brignoles (9)	0–1 (a.e.t.)	Stade Marseillais UC (7)
74.	Stade Laurentin (9)	2–3	ES St André (10)
75.	ASPTT Nice (11)	1–5	Montet Bornala Club Nice (10)
76.	Aix Université CF (10)	4–7	AS Bouc Bel Air (8)
77.	FC Sisteron (8)	2–3	US Vivo 04 (8)
78.	Olympique St Maximinois (9)	2–3	SC Plantourian (10)
79.	US Cap d'Ail (7)	2–1	AS Fontonne (7)
80.	ES La Ciotat (7)	5–0	Olympique Rovenain (7)
81.	CA Plan-de-Cuques (8)	3–0	AS Mazargues (8)
82.	SL Hospitaliers IC Toulon-La Seyne-sur-Mer (8)	2–0	US Pradet (9)
83.	FC Antibes (8)	6–1	Mayotte FC 06 (12)
84.	US Caderousse (10)	0–1 (a.e.t.)	Boxeland Club Islois (9)
85.	AS Valensole Gréoux (8)	4–1	FC Céreste-Reillanne (8)

== Second round ==
These matches were played on 1 and 2 September 2018.

Second round results: Méditerranée
Tie no	Home team (tier)	Score	Away team (tier)
1.	US St Mandrier (8)	1–4	US Carqueiranne-La Crau (6)
2.	ES Solliès-Farlède (9)	1–0	SL Hospitaliers IC Toulon-La Seyne-sur-Mer (8)
3.	Espérance Gordienne (10)	0–3 (a.e.t.)	SC Gadagnien (8)
4.	Avenir Goult Roussillon (12)	1–2 (a.e.t.)	Ventoux Sud FC (9)
5.	Espérance Sorguaise (8)	0–1	Dentelles FC (9)
6.	FC Carpentras (7)	1–3	Espérance Pernoise (6)
7.	SC Montfavet (8)	0–0 (4–3 p)	US Valreas (9)
8.	Olympique Montelais (9)	0–4	Stade Maillanais (7)
9.	US Entraigues (8)	6–5 (a.e.t.)	Avenir Club Avignonnais (9)
10.	Olympique Novais (8)	2–3	Salon Bel Air (6)
11.	JS Pennes Mirabeau (9)	0–1 (a.e.t.)	FA Val Durance (7)
12.	FC St Mitre-les-Remparts (9)	2–0	US Eygalières (9)
13.	JS St Julien (9)	3–1	USPEG Marseille (10)
14.	Boxeland Club Islois (9)	1–3	SC Courthézon (6)
15.	Étoile d'Aubune (9)	4–1	ACS Morières (10)
16.	US Cuers-Pierrefeu (8)	3–4	Six-Fours Le Brusc FC (7)
17.	UA Valettoise (7)	0–2 (a.e.t.)	AS Maximoise (6)
18.	AS Estérel (8)	0–1	FC Pays de Fayence (9)
19.	SC Plantourian (10)	4–7	ES St Zacharie (7)
20.	FC Vidauban (9)	2–5	Gardia Club (8)
21.	SC Nansais (9)	0–4	SC Draguignan (7)
22.	SO Londais (8)	4–0	FCUS Tropézienne (8)
23.	AS St Cyr (9)	0–2	Carnoux FC (6)
24.	Caumont FC (10)	0–3	SC Jonquières (8)
25.	EM Angloise (9)	4–1	Olympique Vaisonnais (10)
26.	Olympic Barbentane (7)	1–0	FA Châteaurenard (8)
27.	ES Fosséenne (7)	3–0	ES La Ciotat (7)
28.	AAS Val St André (9)	1–2	FC Rousset Ste Victoire (7)
29.	St Henri FC (10)	0–5	US Venelles (9)
30.	AS Valensole Gréoux (8)	1–2 (a.e.t.)	AFC Ste Tulle-Pierrevert (8)
31.	ES Haute Siagne (11)	1–1 (5–3 p)	ES Villeneuve-Loubet (10)
32.	US Biot (10)	2–0	Drap Football (10)
33.	FC Mougins Côte d'Azur (8)	2–0	AS Roquebrune-Cap-Martin (9)
34.	AS Vence (7)	0–1 (a.e.t.)	CJ Antibes (8)
35.	FC Carros (8)	1–2	AS Cagnes-Le Cros (6)
36.	FC Antibes (8)	2–7	US Mandelieu-La Napoule (6)
37.	SO Roquettan (11)	2–3	AS Moulins (8)
38.	Montet Bornala Club Nice (10)	1–3	US Pegomas (7)
39.	SC Mouans-Sartoux (7)	1–3	RO Menton (6)
40.	US Vivo 04 (8)	0–1	Gap Foot 05 (7)
41.	CA Digne 04 (7)	1–3 (a.e.t.)	US Veynes-Serres (7)
42.	ES St André (10)	1–5	US Cap d'Ail (7)
43.	Étoile Huveaune (8)	1–6	AC Port-de-Bouc (7)
44.	Stade Marseillais UC (7)	2–1	CA Plan-de-Cuques (8)
45.	AS Simiane-Collongue (9)	2–0	AS Martigues Sud (7)
46.	AS Helvétique (9)	1–0 (a.e.t.)	AC Arlésien (7)
47.	FC Fuveau Provence (10)	1–3	JO St Gabriel (9)
48.	FC Chateauneuf-les-Martigues (9)	1–5	SC Montredon Bonneveine (9)
49.	FC Rognes (9)	1–4	USC Minots du Panier (8)
50.	AS Bouc Bel Air (8)	1–2	EUGA Ardziv (6)
51.	Gardanne Biver FC (7)	1–3	Berre SC (6)
52.	CA Croix Sainte (10)	0–1	AS Coudoux (10)
53.	Pays d'Aix FC (9)	0–1	US Canton Riezois (8)

== Third round ==
These matches were played on 15 and 16 September 2018.

Third round results: Méditerranée
Tie no	Home team (tier)	Score	Away team (tier)
1.	FC Istres (5)	1–0	AS Coudoux (10)
2.	ES Haute Siagne (11)	1–2	US Biot (10)
3.	Gap Foot 05 (7)	1–3	US Mandelieu-La Napoule (6)
4.	AFC Ste Tulle-Pierrevert (8)	1–4	ES Cannet Rocheville (5)
5.	SO Londais (8)	3–1	Carnoux FC (6)
6.	FC Mougins Côte d'Azur (8)	6–3	US Carqueiranne-La Crau (6)
7.	CJ Antibes (8)	0–3 (Note: Match abandoned after 80 minutes, with the scoreline 0–1, when a second firework was thrown onto the pitch by a supporter. CJ Antibes subsequently penalised. AS Cagnes-Le Cros qualify.)	AS Cagnes-Le Cros (6)
8.	Gardia Club (8)	3–1	ES St Zacharie (7)
9.	FC Pays de Fayence (9)	1–4	US Cap d'Ail (7)
10.	AS Moulins (8)	1–3	AS Cannes (5)
11.	FC Rousset Ste Victoire (7)	2–0	RO Menton (6)
12.	SC Draguignan (7)	3–0	Six-Fours Le Brusc FC (7)
13.	US Veynes-Serres (7)	3–1	US Canton Riezois (8)
14.	AS Helvétique (9)	3–0	US Pegomas (7)
15.	AS Gémenos (5)	0–1	Villefranche Saint-Jean Beaulieu FC (5)
16.	Olympic Barbentane (7)	0–1	FC Côte Bleue (5)
17.	Ventoux Sud FC (9)	2–6	ES Fosséenne (7)
18.	AS Simiane-Collongue (9)	3–4 (a.e.t.)	US Pontet Grand Avignon 84 (5)
19.	FC St Mitre-les-Remparts (9)	0–5	Stade Maillanais (7)
20.	FA Val Durance (7)	0–4	Espérance Pernoise (6)
21.	USC Minots du Panier (8)	3–1 (a.e.t.)	EM Angloise (9)
22.	SC Montredon Bonneveine (9)	1–2	SC Montfavet (8)
23.	EUGA Ardziv (6)	1–0	Aubagne FC (5)
24.	Stade Marseillais UC (7)	1–2	AS Saint-Rémoise (5)
25.	AC Port-de-Bouc (7)	1–0	US Entraigues (8)
26.	SC Jonquières (8)	0–4	Salon Bel Air (6)
27.	JO St Gabriel (9)	1–2	SC Courthézon (6)
28.	Étoile d'Aubune (9)	3–4 (a.e.t.)	JS St Julien (9)
29.	US Venelles (9)	1–0 (a.e.t.)	Berre SC (6)
30.	SC Gadagnien (8)	4–0 (Note: Tie switched at the request of both clubs.)	Dentelles FC (9)
31.	ES Solliès-Farlède (9)	0–6	AS Maximoise (6)

== Fourth round ==
These matches were played on 28, 29 and 30 September 2018.

Fourth round results: Méditerranée
Tie no	Home team (tier)	Score	Away team (tier)
1.	SC Courthézon (6)	2–0	Villefranche Saint-Jean Beaulieu FC (5)
2.	SC Gadagnien (8)	0–0 (8–9 p)	AC Port-de-Bouc (7)
3.	JS St Julien (9)	0–2	US Pontet Grand Avignon 84 (5)
4.	US Biot (10)	2–3	AS Cagnes-Le Cros (6)
5.	USC Minots du Panier (8)	0–3	FC Istres (5)
6.	SC Draguignan (7)	1–1 (3–4 p)	ES Cannet Rocheville (5)
7.	FC Martigues (4)	1–2	RC Grasse (4)
8.	US Mandelieu-La Napoule (6)	0–1 (a.e.t.)	FC Côte Bleue (5)
9.	Étoile Fréjus Saint-Raphaël (4)	3–0	AS Saint-Rémoise (5)
10.	Hyères FC (4)	2–1	Athlético Marseille (4)
11.	Gardia Club (8)	2–4	AS Cannes (5)
12.	Stade Maillanais (7)	0–1	FC Rousset Ste Victoire (7)
13.	Salon Bel Air (6)	4–0	EUGA Ardziv (6)
14.	SC Montfavet (8)	0–2	Espérance Pernoise (6)
15.	AS Maximoise (6)	1–1 (5–4 p)	US Marseille Endoume (4)
16.	US Veynes-Serres (7)	2–0	FC Mougins Côte d'Azur (8)
17.	US Venelles (9)	0–3	ES Fosséenne (7)
18.	AS Helvétique (9)	0–2	SC Toulon (4)
19.	US Cap d'Ail (7)	2–1	SO Londais (8)

== Fifth round ==
These matches were played on 13, 14 and 17 October 2018.

Fifth round results: Méditerranée
Tie no	Home team (tier)	Score	Away team (tier)
1.	ES Cannet Rocheville (5)	1–2	Hyères FC (4)
2.	Espérance Pernoise (6)	5–1	US Cap d'Ail (7)
3.	US Pontet Grand Avignon 84 (5)	0–2 (a.e.t.)	FC Côte Bleue (5)
4.	FC Rousset Ste Victoire (7)	2–1	ES Fosséenne (7)
5.	AS Cagnes-Le Cros (6)	0–1 (a.e.t.)	Étoile Fréjus Saint-Raphaël (4)
6.	AC Port-de-Bouc (7)	0–1	SC Toulon (4)
7.	FC Istres (5)	1–3	Marignane Gignac FC (3)
8.	AS Cannes (5)	4–0 (Note: Match abandoned by the referee after 78 minutes due to Salon Bel Air being reduced to less than 8 players.)	Salon Bel Air (6)
9.	SC Courthézon (6)	4–0	US Veynes-Serres (7)
10.	AS Maximoise (6)	1–2	RC Grasse (4)

== Sixth round ==
These matches were played on 27 and 28 October 2018.

Sixth round results: Méditerranée
Tie no	Home team (tier)	Score	Away team (tier)
1.	Marignane Gignac FC (3)	1–0 (a.e.t.)	RC Grasse (4)
2.	SC Toulon (4)	3–2	AS Cannes (5)
3.	FC Côte Bleue (5)	3–1	Espérance Pernoise (6)
4.	FC Rousset Ste Victoire (7)	1–2	Étoile Fréjus Saint-Raphaël (4)
5.	SC Courthézon (6)	0–1	Hyères FC (4)
