= 2021–22 Coupe de France preliminary rounds, Méditerranée =

French football competition

The 2021–22 Coupe de France preliminary rounds, Méditerranée was the qualifying competition to decide which teams from the leagues of the Méditerranée region of France took part in the main competition from the seventh round.

A total of five teams qualified from the Méditerranée preliminary rounds. In 2020–21, Aubagne FC progressed furthest in the main competition, reaching the round of 32 before losing to Toulouse.

== Draws and fixtures ==
On 9 July 2021, the league announced that 246 teams had entered the competition from the region, and that because of the number of teams a preliminary round would need to take place. On 26 July 2021, the league published the draw for the preliminary round, with 30 teams entering from the district league level. The first round draw, which saw the entry of the remaining district level teams and teams from Régionale 2, was published on 9 August 2021. The second round draw, which saw the entry of the remaining Régionale 2 teams and those from Régionale 1, was published on 31 August 2021. The third round draw was published on 8 September 2021. The fourth round draw was published on 21 September 2021. The draws for the fifth and sixth round were made on 6 October 2021.

=== Preliminary round ===
These matches were played on 22 August 2021.

preliminary round results: Méditerranée
Tie no	Home team (tier)	Score	Away team (tier)
1.	SC Allauch (10)	2–3	ES Pennoise (10)
2.	AAS Val Saint-André (9)	3–0 (Note: Tie won by means of forfeit.)	Association Simba Nala Marseille (10)
3.	FC Miramas (10)	4–3	SC Kartala (9)
4.	AS Bombardière Marseille (10)	5–2	AS Nord Aix (10)
5.	SC Barjols (10)	2–2 (2–4 p)	FA Fréjusienne (10)
6.	JS Mourillonnaise (10)	1–10	Entente Pivotte Serinette (11)
7.	FC Revestois (10)	1–3	RC La Baie (10)
8.	CS Sarrians (11)	0–6	US Planaise (9)
9.	Pays d'Apt Football (11)	2–0	SC Rognonais (11)
10.	JS Saint-Étienne-du-Grès (10)	1–7	USR Pertuis (10)
11.	RCB Bollène (9)	3–7	Olympique Eyraguais (10)
12.	AS Sospel (11)	3–2	AS Valleroise (12)
13.	FC Vallées Var Vaïre (12)	3–2	FC Cimiez (11)
14.	Olympique Suquetan Cannes Croisette (10)	1–2	SO Roquettan (11)
15.	FC Cannes Ranguin (11)	1–5	FC Euro African (11)

=== First round ===
These matches were played on 28 and 29 August 2021.

First round results: Méditerranée
Tie no	Home team (tier)	Score	Away team (tier)
1.	SC Draguignan (8)	0–0 (4–2 p)	FC Pugetois (9)
2.	FC Saint-Rémy (10)	3–0 (Note: Tie won by means of forfeit.)	Dentelles FC (10)
3.	AS Estérel (8)	1–2	AS Saint-Cyr (8)
4.	AS Marseillaise Saint-Loup et 10ème (10)	0–7	SC Montredon Bonneveine (8)
5.	USPEG Marseille (9)	0–4	AS Aix-en-Provence (9)
6.	JS Pennes Mirabeau (8)	0–0 (5–4 p)	FC Septèmes (7)
7.	FC Saint-Mitre-les-Remparts (10)	5–1	JS Istréenne (10)
8.	US Tramways Marseille (10)	3–2	JO Saint-Gabriel (9)
9.	SC Saint-Cannat (10)	1–1 (6–5 p)	AS Simiane-Collongue (8)
10.	ES Cuges (10)	3–0	CA Croix Sainte (10)
11.	Aix Université CF (9)	1–1 (4–3 p)	ÉS Port-Saint-Louis-du-Rhône (10)
12.	US Velauxienne (10)	0–1	FC Fuveau Provence (10)
13.	US Trets (8)	0–3 (Note: Tie reversed from original draw.)	US Miramas (10)
14.	FC Saint-Victoret (10)	1–0	US 1er Canton Marseille (9)
15.	SCO Sainte-Marguerite (none)	0–3	SC Saint-Martinois (10)
16.	AS Sainte-Marguerite (10)	0–3	Étoile Huveaune (9)
17.	FO Ventabren (10)	3–2	FC Chateauneuf-les-Martigues (9)
18.	ES Milloise (8)	1–3	Olympique Rovenain (8)
19.	AC Port-de-Bouc (8)	3–1	Gardanne Biver FC (7)
20.	AAS Val Saint-André (9)	0–3	AS Martigues Sud (8)
21.	AS Rognac (10)	0–5	Burel FC (8)
22.	AS Bombardière Marseille (10)	1–6	Luynes Sports (7)
23.	FC Miramas (10)	0–8	AS Bouc Bel Air (7)
24.	ES Pennoise (10)	4–0	AS Mazargues (8)
25.	Boxeland Club Islois (9)	0–2	US Farenque (9)
26.	SC Mondragon (9)	0–2	AC Arlésien (7)
27.	US La Cadière (9)	1–1 (5–4 p)	SO Lavandou (8)
28.	ES Pierredon Mouriès (10)	0–5	Stade Maillanais (7)
29.	RC La Baie (10)	1–1 (1–4 p)	US Cuers-Pierrefeu (7)
30.	US Rians (10)	2–4	SC Nansais (9)
31.	FCUS Tropézienne (7)	3–0	UA Valettoise (7)
32.	FC Vidauban (10)	1–8	FC Ramatuelle (7)
33.	SC Plantourian (10)	0–3	FC Pays du Fayence (9)
34.	Tremplin FC (9)	0–3	SO Londais (7)
35.	ES Solliès-Farlède (8)	0–4	Gardia Club (7)
36.	US Saint-Mandrier (8)	5–1	AS Arcoise (9)
37.	JS Beaussetanne (10)	1–1 (4–3 p)	US Pradet (8)
38.	Olympique Salernois (10)	5–1	SC Tourvain (11)
39.	Olympique Saint-Maximinois (8)	1–1 (5–3 p)	AS Mar Vivo (9)
40.	CA Plan-de-Cuques (8)	1–2	Saint-Henri FC (9)
41.	ASPTT Hyères (10)	1–4	US Ollioulaise (9)
42.	CA Cannetois (8)	2–4	SC Cogolin (8)
43.	AS Brignoles (10)	3–0	Entente ASPTT Hospitaliers Toulon (8)
44.	US Bandol (10)	0–3	CA Roquebrunois (9)
45.	Entente Pivotte Serinette (11)	4–1	FC Grimaud (9)
46.	FA Fréjusienne (10)	0–3	FC Rocbaron (9)
47.	US Sanary (10)	0–2	ES La Ciotat (7)
48.	Phocea Club Marseille (10)	2–4	SC Cayolle (9)
49.	Salon Nord (10)	0–2	ES Salin-de-Giraud (10)
50.	US Puyricard (9)	1–2	US Pélican (10)
51.	US Thoroise (11)	0–0 (3–5 p)	US Eygalières (9)
52.	AS Vence (7)	3–1	FC Antibes (8)
53.	ES Contoise (10)	1–1 (4–5 p)	OC Blausasc (10)
54.	ES Villeneuve-Loubet (10)	3–2	ÉS Saint-André (10)
55.	Entente Saint-Sylvestre Nice Nord (8)	4–3	Trinité SFC (8)
56.	US Valbonne (9)	5–1	Drap Football (9)
57.	FC Mougins Côte d'Azur (8)	3–1	Montet Bornala Club de Nice (9)
58.	FC Beausoleil (8)	5–1	US Plan de Grasse (8)
59.	CA Peymeinade (8)	1–3	ES des Baous (8)
60.	CAS Eaux Nice (12)	5–0	Étoile Menton (9)
61.	FC Carros (8)	1–1 (4–5 p)	CDJ Antibes (8)
62.	ASPTT Nice (10)	1–2	US Biot (10)
63.	AO Tourrette-Levens (10)	1–4	AS Roquefort (9)
64.	AS Moulins (8)	5–1	US Pegomas (7)
65.	US Cannes Bocca Olympique (10)	1–1 (4–3 p)	Saint-Paul-la-Colle OC (10)
66.	AS Roquebrune-Cap-Martin (8)	2–3	US Cap d'Ail (7)
67.	SC Mouans-Sartoux (7)	2–4	AS Fontonne Antibes (7)
68.	SO Roquettan (11)	0–0 (3–4 p)	Gazélec Sport Nice (12)
69.	FC des Vallées Var Vaïre (12)	0–3	AS Sospel (11)
70.	AS Dauphin (10)	0–3	US Méenne (8)
71.	Laragne Sports (8)	2–0	FC Céreste-Reillanne (8)
72.	FC Sisteron (8)	5–0 (Note: Match abandoned after US Canton Riezois were reduced to less than 8 players. FC Sisteron qualify.)	US Canton Riezois (8)
73.	SC Vinonnais (8)	1–1 (2–4 p)	Gap Foot 05 (8)
74.	CA Digne 04 (8)	3–2	US Châteauneuf Aubignosc Peipin (8)
75.	US Vivo 04 (8)	1–3	US Veynes-Serres (7)
76.	EP Manosque (8)	0–3	AFC Sainte-Tulle-Pierrevert (7)
77.	Étoile d'Aubune (9)	0–3	FC Avignon Ouest (9)
78.	Pays d'Apt Football (11)	0–5	Caumont FC (9)
79.	Avenir Goult Roussillon (10)	1–2	US Caderousse (10)
80.	USR Pertuis (10)	0–1	Olympique Eyraguais (10)
81.	ES Sud Luberon (10)	2–2 (2–4 p)	US Saint-Saturnin-lès-Avignon (10)
82.	EJGC Graveson (10)	4–0	FC Vignères (10)
83.	US Autre Provence (8)	1–1 (6–5 p)	SO Velleronnais (9)
84.	Tarascon SC (10)	0–2	JS Visannaise (8)
85.	FC Carpentras (9)	2–1	Orange FC (10)
86.	Réveil Grozeau Malaucène (10)	0–3	RC Provence (8)
87.	Olympique Montelais (8)	3–2	ACS Morières (9)
88.	Espérance Gordienne (9)	0–0 (5–4 p)	SC Gadagne (8)
89.	Entente Saint-Jean-du-Grès (10)	5–1	OM Luberon (11)
90.	FC Cheval Blanc (9)	3–2	FA Châteaurenard (9)
91.	US Planaise (9)	2–2 (4–5 p)	Espérance Pernoise (7)
92.	Bollène Foot (11)	1–5	ES Boulbon (8)
93.	FC Aureille (10)	2–1	SC Althen-des-Paluds (9)
94.	AS Camaretois (8)	3–0	ARC Cavaillon (9)
95.	Avenir Club Avignonnais (9)	0–3	SC Jonquières (7)
96.	SC Montfavet (8)	2–0	Olympique Novais (7)
97.	AS Piolenc (9)	4–8	FA Val Durance (7)
98.	US Avignonnaise (8)	1–6	Olympic Barbentane (7)
99.	EM Angloise (7)	0–1	AC Le Pontet-Vedène (7)
100.	FC Euro African (11)	7–0 (Note: Match abandoned after Stade Laurentin were reduced to less than 8 players. FC Euro African qualify.)	Stade Laurentin (8)

=== Second round ===
These matches were played on 5 September 2021, with one postponed until 15 September 2021.

Second round results: Méditerranée
Tie no	Home team (tier)	Score	Away team (tier)
1.	ES Cuges (10)	0–1	AS Gémenos (6)
2.	FC Aureille (10)	1–2	ES Boulbon (8)
3.	FC Saint-Rémy (10)	1–1 (4–5 p)	FC Cheval Blanc (9)
4.	Espérance Gordienne (9)	0–3	AC Le Pontet-Vedène (7)
5.	US Saint-Saturnin-lès-Avignon (10)	0–3	Olympique Montelais (8)
6.	FC Carpentras (9)	1–3 (Note: Match abandoned after projectiles were thrown at the referee. FC Carpentras penalised. Olympic Barbentane qualify.)	Olympic Barbentane (7)
7.	FC Avignon Ouest (9)	0–3	SC Jonquières (7)
8.	EJGC Graveson (10)	3–2	US Autre Provence (8)
9.	RC Provence (8)	3–2	SC Saint-Cannat (10)
10.	Caumont FC (9)	3–3 (4–2 p)	SC Courthézon (6)
11.	US Eygalières (9)	2–3	Entente Saint-Jean-du-Grès (10)
12.	SC Montfavet (8)	6–4	Olympique Eyraguais (10)
13.	US Caderousse (10)	0–2	Espérance Pernoise (7)
14.	AS Martigues Sud (8)	1–4	ES Fosséenne (6)
15.	Laragne Sports (8)	0–3 (Note: Tie won by means of forfeit.)	US Veynes-Serres (7)
16.	Luynes Sports (7)	0–4	Carnoux FC (6)
17.	Saint-Henri FC (9)	3–2	Salon Bel Air (6)
18.	AS Bouc Bel Air (7)	1–1 (4–3 p)	Stade Marseillais UC (6)
19.	Olympique Rovenain (8)	0–6	EUGA Ardziv (6)
20.	Étoile Huveaune (9)	0–3	ES La Ciotat (7)
21.	ES Pennoise (10)	2–3	AC Port-de-Bouc (8)
22.	AS Aix-en-Provence (9)	5–0	FC Fuveau Provence (10)
23.	JS Pennes Mirabeau (8)	2–0	Burel FC (8)
24.	ES Salin-de-Giraud (10)	1–3	SC Cayolle (9)
25.	SC Saint-Martinois (10)	2–0	FC Saint-Victoret (10)
26.	US Tramways Marseille (10)	3–0	FC Saint-Mitre-les-Remparts (10)
27.	SC Montredon Bonneveine (8)	5–2	Aix Université CF (9)
28.	FO Ventabren (10)	2–4	US Miramas (10)
29.	Stade Maillanais (7)	1–0	FA Val Durance (7)
30.	CA Digne 04 (8)	1–2	AFC Sainte-Tulle-Pierrevert (7)
31.	US Méenne (8)	2–3	Gap Foot 05 (8)
32.	US Pélican (10)	3–2	FC Sisteron (8)
33.	Entente Pivotte Serinette (11)	0–6	AS Maximoise (6)
34.	AS Saint-Cyr (8)	1–2	ES Saint-Zacharie (6)
35.	AS Brignoles (10)	1–1 (6–5 p)	Six-Fours Le Brusc FC (6)
36.	FCUS Tropézienne (7)	2–1	US Carqueiranne-La Crau (6)
37.	FC Rocbaron (9)	2–4	SC Draguignan (8)
38.	SC Cogolin (8)	5–0	CA Roquebrunois (9)
39.	Olympique Salernois (10)	1–4	US Saint-Mandrier (8)
40.	FC Pays du Fayence (9)	3–1	US Cuers-Pierrefeu (7)
41.	US Ollioulaise (9)	2–2 (7–8 p)	US Farenque (9)
42.	JS Beaussetanne (10)	1–1 (3–5 p)	Gardia Club (7)
43.	SC Nansais (9)	0–3	SO Londais (7)
44.	Olympique Saint-Maximinois (8)	6–0	US La Cadière (9)
45.	AS Fontonne Antibes (7)	3–2	RO Menton (6)
46.	ES des Baous (8)	0–3	AS Cagnes-Le Cros (6)
47.	ES Villeneuve-Loubet (10)	0–2	US Cap d'Ail (7)
48.	FC Mougins Côte d'Azur (8)	1–0	AS Vence (7)
49.	AS Sospel (11)	1–3	CDJ Antibes (8)
50.	Gazélec Sport Nice (12)	1–6	AS Moulins (8)
51.	CAS Eaux Nice (12)	0–5	FC Beausoleil (8)
52.	AS Roquefort (9)	2–3	Entente Saint-Sylvestre Nice Nord (8)
53.	US Biot (10)	4–6	US Valbonne (9)
54.	OC Blausasc (10)	1–4	FC Euro African (11)
55.	US Cannes Bocca Olympique (10)	2–5	FC Ramatuelle (7)
56.	JS Visannaise (8)	2–2 (5–4 p)	AS Camaretois (8)
57.	AC Arlésien (7)	0–0 (4–2 p) (Note: Original match postponed due to a swarm of flying ants. Ordered to be played on 15 September.)	Berre SC (6)

=== Third round ===
These matches were played on 18 and 19 September 2021.

Third round results: Méditerranée
Tie no	Home team (tier)	Score	Away team (tier)
1.	Athlético Marseille (5)	0–0 (5–6 p)	FC Istres (5)
2.	US Valbonne (9)	0–6	AS Cannes (5)
3.	AC Le Pontet-Vedène (7)	11–2	JS Visannaise (8)
4.	Carnoux FC (6)	2–2 (1–4 p)	FC Côte Bleue (5)
5.	FC Cheval Blanc (9)	0–4	RC Provence (8)
6.	Entente Saint-Jean-du-Grès (10)	0–1	SC Jonquières (7)
7.	US Marseille Endoume (6)	5–0 (Note: Tie reversed from original draw.)	US Miramas (10)
8.	US Farenque (9)	1–4	Olympic Barbentane (7)
9.	AFC Sainte-Tulle-Pierrevert (7)	3–1	Espérance Pernoise (7)
10.	AC Port-de-Bouc (8)	1–0	AS Bouc Bel Air (7)
11.	ES Boulbon (8)	4–1	Olympique Montelais (8)
12.	US Pélican (10)	1–4	SC Montredon Bonneveine (8)
13.	SC Saint-Martinois (10)	4–3	US Tramways Marseille (10)
14.	AS Aix-en-Provence (9)	2–2 (5–4 p)	SC Montfavet (8)
15.	Saint-Henri FC (9)	3–0	JS Pennes Mirabeau (8)
16.	EUGA Ardziv (6)	1–1 (3–1 p)	AC Arlésien (7)
17.	ES Fosséenne (6)	2–2 (3–4 p)	Stade Maillanais (7)
18.	Caumont FC (9)	5–0	EJGC Graveson (10)
19.	Entente Saint-Sylvestre Nice Nord (8)	3–0	US Veynes-Serres (7)
20.	AS Gémenos (6)	3–2	ES La Ciotat (7)
21.	AS Cagnes-Le Cros (6)	4–1	FC Ramatuelle (7)
22.	AS Brignoles (10)	2–1	AS Moulins (8)
23.	CDJ Antibes (8)	2–2 (4–5 p)	US Saint-Mandrier (8)
24.	FC Beausoleil (8)	4–2	FC Pays du Fayence (9)
25.	US Cap d'Ail (7)	0–3	ES Saint-Zacharie (6)
26.	Olympique Saint-Maximinois (8)	0–0 (2–4 p)	ES Cannet Rocheville (5)
27.	SC Draguignan (8)	1–3	FC Rousset Sainte Victoire (5)
28.	FCUS Tropézienne (7)	1–3	Villefranche Saint-Jean Beaulieu FC (5)
29.	SC Cayolle (9)	1–5	AS Fontonne Antibes (7)
30.	FC Euro African (11)	1–3	AS Maximoise (6)
31.	SC Cogolin (8)	3–1	US Mandelieu-La Napoule (5)
32.	Gardia Club (7)	2–0	Gap Foot 05 (8)
33.	SO Londais (7)	1–2	FC Mougins Côte d'Azur (8)

=== Fourth round ===
These matches were played on 2 and 3 October 2021.

Fourth round results: Méditerranée
Tie no	Home team (tier)	Score	Away team (tier)
1.	EUGA Ardziv (6)	1–2	Marignane Gignac FC (4)
2.	Caumont FC (9)	0–3	ÉFC Fréjus Saint-Raphaël (4)
3.	SC Toulon (4)	1–2 (Note: Tie reversed from original draw.)	US Marseille Endoume (6)
4.	FC Martigues (4)	0–0 (5–3 p)	RC Grasse (4)
5.	RC Provence (8)	0–2	FC Rousset Sainte Victoire (5)
6.	AS Fontonne Antibes (7)	2–2 (6–5 p)	Hyères FC (4)
7.	FC Beausoleil (8)	2–4	Gardia Club (7)
8.	SC Cogolin (8)	1–3	AS Cannes (5)
9.	FC Istres (5)	1–1 (5–4 p)	AS Gémenos (6)
10.	FC Mougins Côte d'Azur (8)	6–1	Entente Saint-Sylvestre Nice Nord (8)
11.	US Saint-Mandrier (8)	1–1 (3–2 p)	AS Cagnes-Le Cros (6)
12.	AS Brignoles (10)	0–0 (6–7 p)	Stade Maillanais (7)
13.	Saint-Henri FC (9)	1–1 (4–5 p)	ES Boulbon (8)
14.	SC Jonquières (7)	0–0 (4–5 p)	FC Côte Bleue (5)
15.	SC Saint-Martinois (10)	0–9	Villefranche Saint-Jean Beaulieu FC (5)
16.	AC Port-de-Bouc (8)	1–0	AFC Sainte-Tulle-Pierrevert (7)
17.	ES Saint-Zacharie (6)	0–2	Aubagne FC (4)
18.	Olympic Barbentane (7)	0–0 (2–4 p)	ES Cannet Rocheville (5)
19.	SC Montredon Bonneveine (8)	1–1 (2–3 p)	AS Aix-en-Provence (9)
20.	AS Maximoise (6)	0–2	AC Le Pontet-Vedène (7)

=== Fifth round ===
These matches were played on 16 and 17 October 2021.

Fifth round results: Méditerranée
Tie no	Home team (tier)	Score	Away team (tier)
1.	ÉFC Fréjus Saint-Raphaël (4)	1–1 (4–5 p)	FC Istres (5)
2.	US Marseille Endoume (6)	1–0	FC Rousset Sainte Victoire (5)
3.	FC Mougins Côte d'Azur (8)	0–0 (4–2 p)	Villefranche Saint-Jean Beaulieu FC (5)
4.	Gardia Club (7)	3–0	AC Le Pontet-Vedène (7)
5.	AS Aix-en-Provence (9)	1–0	AC Port-de-Bouc (8)
6.	ES Boulbon (8)	1–3	Marignane Gignac FC (4)
7.	US Saint-Mandrier (8)	1–5	FC Martigues (4)
8.	Stade Maillanais (7)	0–2	ES Cannet Rocheville (5)
9.	Aubagne FC (4)	4–2	FC Côte Bleue (5)
10.	AS Fontonne Antibes (7)	0–1	AS Cannes (5)

=== Sixth round ===
These matches were played on 31 October 2021.

Sixth round results: Méditerranée
Tie no	Home team (tier)	Score	Away team (tier)
1.	Gardia Club (7)	0–1	AS Cannes (5)
2.	AS Aix-en-Provence (9)	0–4	Aubagne FC (4)
3.	ES Cannet Rocheville (5)	3–0	US Marseille Endoume (6)
4.	FC Mougins Côte d'Azur (8)	0–2	FC Istres (5)
5.	FC Martigues (4)	4–3	Marignane Gignac FC (4)
