= Puel =

Puel (French pronunciation: [pɥɛl]) is a French surname. It may refer to:

- Claude Puel (born 1961), French football manager and former player
- Grégoire Puel (born 1992), French footballer
- Paulin Puel (born 1997), French footballer
- Timothée Puel (1812–1890), French physician and botanist
