= Saïd Mhoudini =

French association football player (born 1984)

Personal information
- Full name: Saïd Alibou Mhoudini
- Date of birth: 4 September 1984 (age 42)
- Place of birth: France
- Position: Forward

Senior career*
Years	Team	Apps	(Gls)
–2004	Martigues		
2004–2005	OM B		
2005–2007	Istres	1	(0)
2007–2008	ACFC		
2008	Locarno		
2009	Gardanne Biver		
2009–2010	Visé		
2012–2013	UA Cognac		

International career
2011	Comoros		
- * Club domestic league appearances and goals

Saïd Alibou Mhoudini (born 4 September 1984) is a former footballer who played as a defender. Born in France, he was a Comoros international.

== Career ==
In 2006, Mhoudini signed for French second-tier side Istres, where he made 1 league appearance and scored 0 goals. In 2007, he signed for ACFC in the French fifth tier. In 2008, Mhoudini signed for Swiss second-tier club Locarno. Before the second half of 2008–09, he signed for Gardanne Biver in the French fifth tier. Before the second half of 2012–13, he signed for French sixth tier team UA Cognac.
