= Julien Berthomier =

French footballer (born 1990)

Personal information
- Full name: Julien Berthomier
- Date of birth: 15 April 1990 (age 36)
- Place of birth: Grasse, France
- Height: 1.81 m (5 ft 11 in)
- Position: Defender

Team information
- Current team: Villefranche Saint-Jean Beaulieu

Youth career
- 1997–2001: Grasse
- 2001–2003: Cannet Rocheville
- 2003–2006: Cannes
- 2006–2007: Nice

Senior career*
Years	Team	Apps	(Gls)
2007–2013	Nice	1	(0)
2010–2011	→ Gueugnon (loan)	25	(0)
2011–2012	→ Red Star (loan)	13	(0)
2013–2014	Francs Borains	25	(1)
2018–	Villefranche Saint-Jean Beaulieu	46	(2)

International career
2005–2006	France U15	9	(0)
2006–2007	France U16	6	(0)
- * Club domestic league appearances and goals as of 00:58, 1 December 2021 (UTC)

Julien Berthomier (born 10 April 1990) is a French professional footballer who plays as a defender for Championnat National 3 club Villefranche Saint-Jean Beaulieu.

== Club career ==
Born in Grasse, Berthomier began his career with RC Grasse and signed in 2001 with Cannet Rocheville. In the summer of 2004, he joined Cannes. In Cannes, Berthomier played for three years before being transferred to Nice.

== International career ==
Berthomier has played for France at under-15 and under-16 level.
