= Grégoire Puel =

French footballer (born 1992)

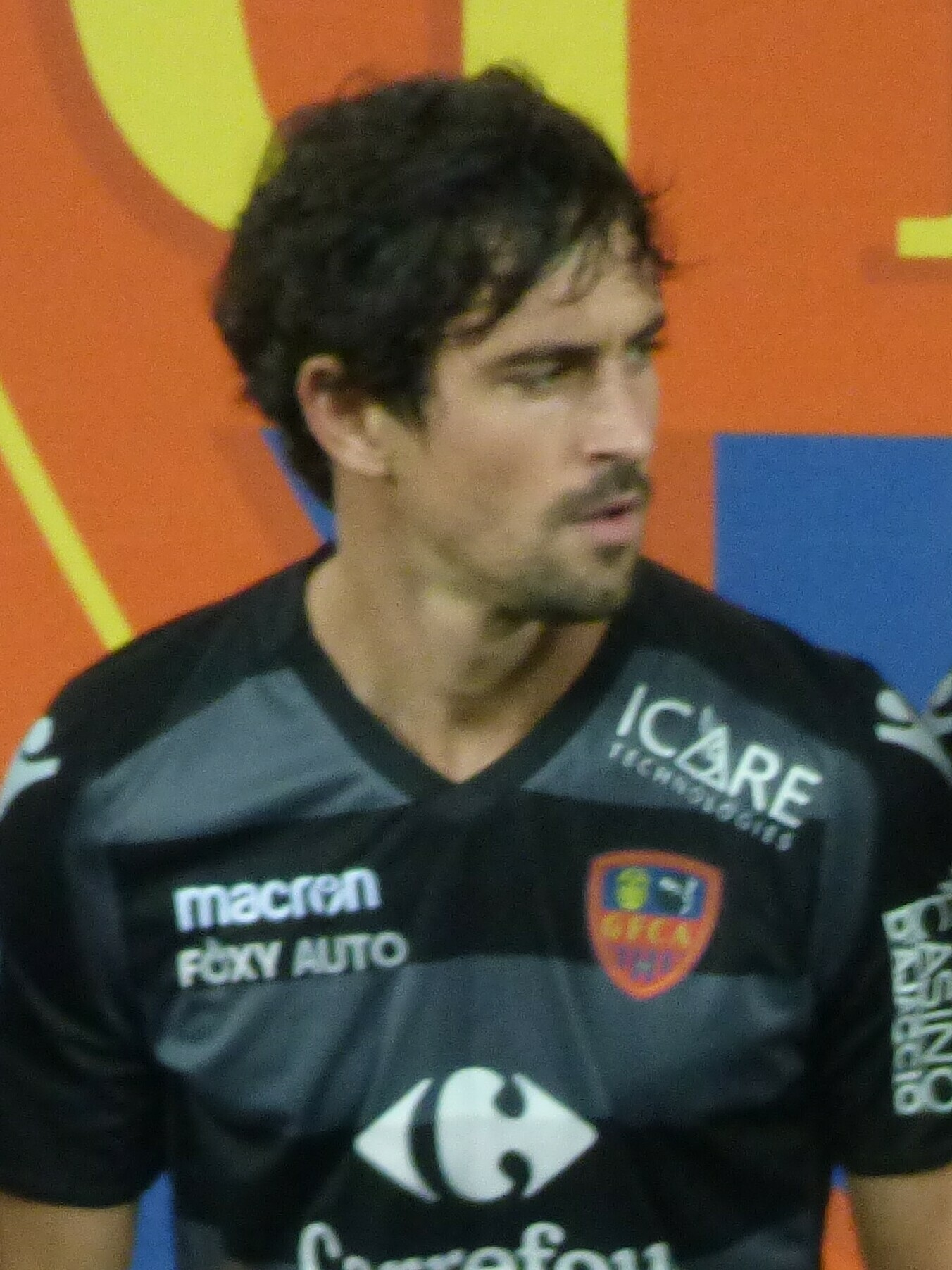
- Puel with Gazélec Ajaccio in 2018

Personal information
- Date of birth: 20 February 1992 (age 34)
- Place of birth: Nice, France
- Height: 1.81 m (5 ft 11 in)
- Position: Right-back

Youth career
- –2012: Lyon

Senior career*
Years	Team	Apps	(Gls)
2010–2012	Lyon B	24	(2)
2012–2015	Nice	64	(1)
2013	Nice B	2	(0)
2015–2017	Le Havre	15	(0)
2015–2017	Le Havre B	18	(0)
2017–2019	Gazélec Ajaccio	43	(1)
2020–2021	Voluntari	2	(0)
2021–2022	Villefranche SJB	17	(0)

International career
2011	France U20	2	(0)
- * Club domestic league appearances and goals as of 00:56, 6 January 2025 (UTC)

Grégoire Puel (born 20 February 1992) is a French professional footballer who plays as a right-back.

== Career ==
Born in Nice, Puel was an academy player at Lyon but never made the first team, instead featuring for the reserve team in the Championnat de France Amateur (fourth tier). In 2012, he signed for OGC Nice, managed by his father Claude. He made his professional debut in Ligue 1 on 16 February 2013, as the side won 1–0 at Bastia. He scored once for the Cote d'Azur club, in a 3–1 home loss to former team Lyon on 1 November 2014.

In August 2015, Puel cancelled his Nice contract by mutual accord and moved to Ligue 2 club Le Havre on a two-year deal with the option of a third. His time in Normandy was split almost equally between the club's first and second teams.

New Le Havre manager Oswald Tanchot did not field Puel at all in 2016–17, and passed up the opportunity of a contract extension, leaving him free to join Gazélec Ajaccio of the same league on a two-year deal in July 2017. He scored once for the Corsicans, in a 2–0 home win over Nîmes the following 23 January, and was released following their relegation in 2019.

== Personal life ==
Puel is the son of the French manager and former footballer Claude Puel, and older brother of footballer Paulin Puel. All three were colleagues at Nice.
