= Paulin Puel =

French footballer (born 1997)

Personal information
- Date of birth: 9 May 1997 (age 29)
- Place of birth: Nice, France
- Height: 1.80 m (5 ft 11 in)
- Position: Forward

Youth career
- 2003–2008: Lille
- 2008–2012: Lyon
- 2012–2014: Nice

Senior career*
Years	Team	Apps	(Gls)
2014–2017	Nice B	24	(6)
2014–2017	Nice	14	(0)
2018	Monaco B	3	(0)
2018–2021	Avranches	31	(3)
2018–2020	Avranches B	15	(9)
2021	Castelldefels	9	(1)
2021–2024	RC Grasse	45	(5)

International career
2015	France U19	4	(0)
- * Club domestic league appearances and goals as of 1 July 2024

Paulin Puel (born 9 May 1997) is a French footballer who plays as a forward.

== Club career ==
Born in Nice, Puel spent his youth career at Lille, Lyon and OGC Nice, all under the management of his father Claude. He made his Ligue 1 debut on 20 April 2014 against AS Monaco, replacing Valentin Eysseric after 88 minutes in a 1–0 away defeat.

After some months at Monaco, where he was mainly in the youth team and played a small part in the reserve team, Puel joined Avranches of the third-tier Championnat National in August 2018.

== Personal life ==
Puel is the son of the French manager and former footballer Claude Puel, and younger brother of the footballer Grégoire Puel. All three were colleagues at Nice.

== Career statistics ==
As of 20 September 2019

Appearances and goals by club, season and competition
Club	Season	League			Coupe de France		Coupe de la Ligue		Continental		Others		Total	
Club	Season	Division	Apps	Goals	Apps	Goals	Apps	Goals	Apps	Goals	Apps	Goals	Apps	Goals
Nice	2013–14	Ligue 1	2	0	0	0	0	0	—		—		2	0
Nice	Ligue 1	2014–15	1	0	0	0	0	0	—		—		1	0
Nice	Ligue 1	2015–16	11	0	0	0	2	0	—		—		13	0
Nice	Total		14	0	0	0	2	0	0	0	0	0	16	0
Nice B	2013–14	CFA	3	0	—		—		—		—		3	0
Nice B	CFA	2014–15	13	6	—		—		—		—		13	6
Nice B	CFA	2015–16	3	0	—		—		—		—		3	0
Nice B	CFA	2016–17	5	0	—		—		—		—		5	0
Nice B	Total		24	6	0	0	0	0	0	0	0	0	24	6
Monaco B	2017–18	National 2	3	0	—		—		—		—		3	0
Avranches	2018–19	National	26	3	2	0	—		—		—		28	3
Avranches	2019–20	National	2	0	0	0	—		—		—		2	0
Avranches	Total		28	3	2	0	—		—		—		30	3
Avranches B	2018–19	National 3	1	1	—		—		—		—		1	1
Avranches B	2019–20	National 3	3	1	—		—		—		—		3	1
Avranches B	Total		3	2	—		—		—		—		3	2
Career total			72	11	2	0	2	0	0	0	0	0	76	11
