= Claude Puel =

French football manager (born 1961)

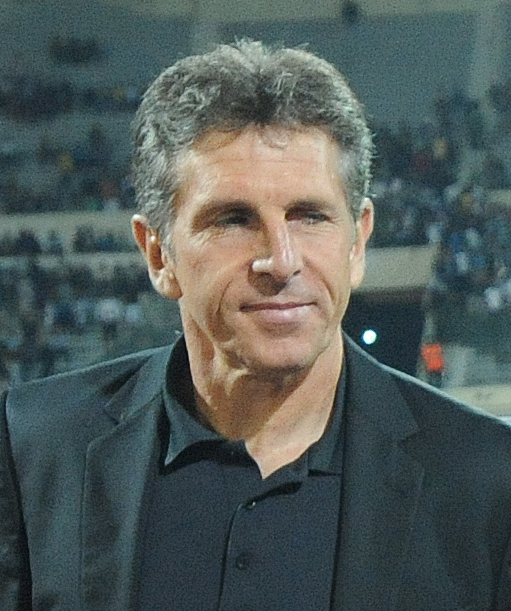
- Puel in 2013

Personal information
- Full name: Claude Jacques Puel
- Date of birth: 2 September 1961 (age 65)
- Place of birth: Castres, Tarn, France
- Height: 1.77 m (5 ft 10 in)
- Position: Defensive midfielder

Youth career
- 1970–1977: Castres
- 1977–1979: Monaco

Senior career*
Years	Team	Apps	(Gls)
1979–1996	Monaco	488	(4)

Managerial career
- 1999–2001: Monaco
- 2002–2008: Lille
- 2008–2011: Lyon
- 2012–2016: Nice
- 2016–2017: Southampton
- 2017–2019: Leicester City
- 2019–2021: Saint-Étienne
- 2025–2026: Nice
- * Club domestic league appearances and goals

Claude Jacques Puel (French pronunciation: [klod pɥɛl]; born 2 September 1961) is a French football manager and former player who was most recently the head coach of Ligue 1 club Nice.

He played as a midfielder. He spent his entire playing career with Monaco, before becoming manager of the club, leading them to the league title in his first full season in charge. He has also managed Lille, Lyon, Nice and Saint-Étienne in Ligue 1, and Southampton and Leicester City in England's Premier League.

== Playing career ==
Puel started his football career as a youth with Castres, where he was spotted by Monaco, joining their training centre in 1977. He played his first professional game in the 1979–80 season. He spent his entire career at Monaco, playing 601 official matches in total. During his time at Monaco, he won two championships and three French Cups. He also played under compatriot Arsène Wenger who jovially recalled being on the wrong end of a sliding tackle saying "Even on the morning of a Cup final he could tackle and even if it was the manager then no problem!".

== Managerial career ==
=== Monaco ===
Before being appointed as the manager of Monaco, he was the physical trainer and manager of Monaco's reserve team. He was appointed as the manager in January 1999. He won the French Championship in 2000, with players such as Ludovic Giuly and Marcelo Gallardo.

=== Lille ===
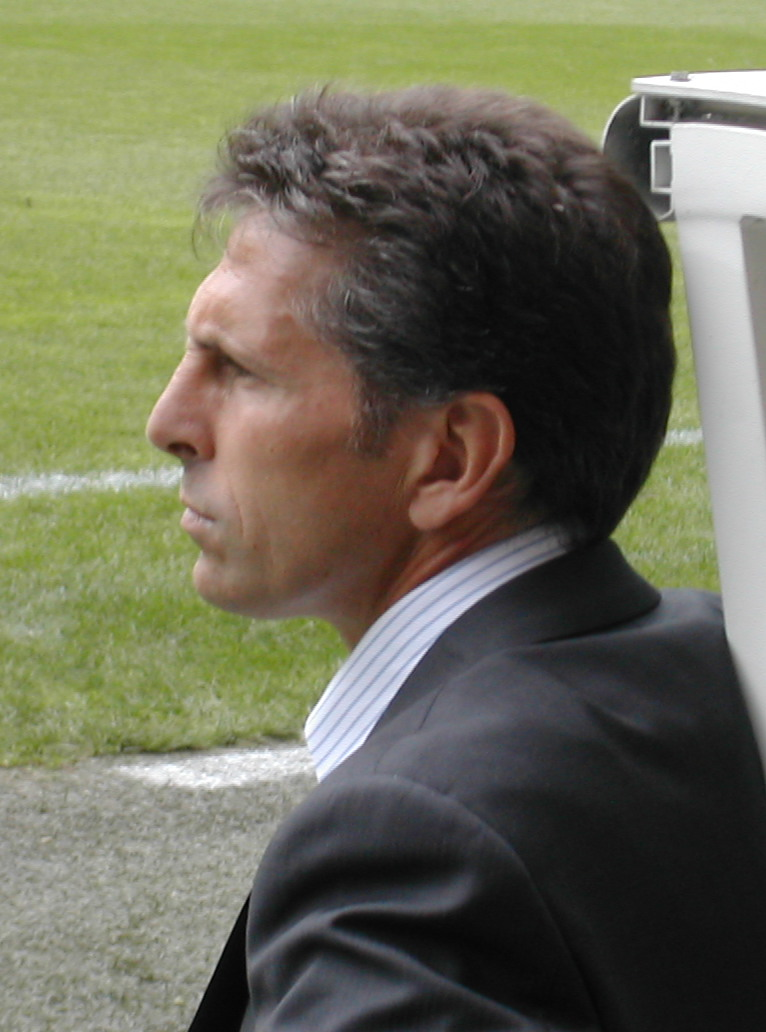
Puel as Lille manager in 2006

Lille were one of the winners of the 2004 UEFA Intertoto Cup, having defeated União de Leiria of Portugal 2–0 in extra time in the final after a goalless aggregate draw.

=== Lyon ===
Puel joined Lyon, the team who had won the last seven French league titles, on a four-year contract on 18 June 2008. In 2010, he helped the club reach the semi-final of the Champions League for the first time in its history. In his final game in charge in May 2011, he defeated his former club Monaco and ended their 34-year spell in the top flight. Lyon terminated his contract on 20 June 2011, although he had just finished third, as he had not won a trophy in his three seasons.

=== Nice ===
On 23 May 2012, Puel reached agreement on a three-year deal with Nice.

=== Southampton ===
On 30 June 2016, Puel was appointed the manager of Southampton on a three-year deal. On 14 June 2017, Puel's contract was "terminated with immediate effect". His sacking yielded mixed reactions. In his only season in charge, Southampton reached the League Cup final and recorded an 8th-place finish in the Premier League, albeit with 17 fewer points than his predecessor Ronald Koeman attained the season prior. Puel was particularly criticised for his defensive tactics, with Southampton's scoring record one of the poorest in the league. Sports journalist Paul Doyle called Puel "a victim of Southampton's admirably unreasonable expectations".

=== Leicester City ===
On 25 October 2017, Puel was appointed as the new manager of struggling Premier League side Leicester City, replacing recently sacked Craig Shakespeare, on a contract running until June 2020. His first game in charge came on 29 October, when they beat Everton 2–0 in the Premier League.

From 31 January 2018 until the end of the season, Leicester recorded only three wins from 14 league games, a dismal run that saw Puel accused of negative football. His decision to block Riyad Mahrez's transfer to Manchester City on deadline day resulted in the player going absent from training for ten days. Puel joined Leicester in 13th place and helped the club climb up the table to finish in ninth position. After the season concluded, it was speculated that Puel would be leaving the club, though he continued as manager.

Puel's decision to leave Adrien Silva out of the first team squad and make him train with the under-23s was criticized by the player's father, who accused the manager of unfairly "picking on his son". A shock 2–1 FA Cup third round defeat to League Two club Newport County on 6 January 2019, in which Puel was jeered by Leicester fans for fielding an understrength side, was voted by BBC viewers as the biggest upset of the competition. After six league games without a win, Puel was sacked by Leicester on 24 February 2019, following a defeat at home to Crystal Palace the previous day.

=== Saint-Étienne ===
On 4 October 2019, Puel returned to Ligue 1 when he was appointed as Saint-Étienne's new manager, on a contract lasting until 2022. Two days later was his first match, the Derby du Rhône against his former team Lyon, and won 1–0 at home with a last-minute goal by substitute Robert Beric.

Puel's team beat reigning champions Rennes in the semi-finals of the Coupe de France on 5 March 2020, to reach the final for the first time since 1982. They lost that match on 24 July, by a single goal to Paris Saint-Germain.

On 5 December 2021, Puel was sacked after a 5–0 loss to Rennes, with his team in last place with two wins from 17.

=== Return to Nice ===
On 29 December 2025, Puel returned to Nice when he was appointed as manager, on a contract lasting until the end of the season. He left the club at the end of the season upon the expiry of his contract.

== Personal life ==
Puel has two sons and a daughter. Both of his sons, Paulin and Grégoire, are professional footballers and played under his command at Nice.

== Managerial statistics ==
As of match played 29 May 2026

Managerial record by team and tenure
Team	From	To	Record				
Team	From	To	P	W	D	L	Win %
Monaco	13 January 1999	30 June 2001	113	56	24	33	49.56
Lille	1 July 2002	17 June 2008	299	119	94	86	39.80
Lyon	18 June 2008	20 June 2011	156	76	44	36	48.72
Nice	23 May 2012	24 May 2016	169	69	38	62	40.83
Southampton	30 June 2016	14 June 2017	53	20	13	20	37.74
Leicester City	25 October 2017	24 February 2019	67	23	18	26	34.33
Saint-Étienne	4 October 2019	5 December 2021	88	26	23	39	29.55
Nice	29 December 2025	17 June 2026	27	6	12	9	22.22
Total			972	395	266	311	40.64

== Honours ==
=== Player ===
Monaco

- Ligue 1: 1981–82, 1987–88
- Coupe de France: 1980, 1985, 1991
- Trophée des Champions: 1985

=== Manager ===
Monaco

- Ligue 1: 1999–2000
- Trophée des Champions: 2000

Lille

- UEFA Intertoto Cup: 2004

Southampton

- EFL Cup runner-up: 2016–17

Saint-Étienne

- Coupe de France runner-up: 2019–20

Nice

- Coupe de France runner-up: 2025–26

== See also ==
- List of one-club men in association football
