= US Le Pontet Grand Avignon 84 =

French football club

USP Grand Avignon
- Full name: US Pontet Grand Avignon 84
- Founded: 1980
- Dissolved: 2021
- Ground: Stade de Montbord
- Chairman: Jihad Meroueh
- Manager: Mohamed Chaouch
- League: Regional 1, Mediterranée
- 2018–19: National 3 Group D, 12th (relegated)
Home colours

US Pontet Grand Avignon 84 (previously Union Sportive Le Pontet Football) was a football club based in Le Pontet, Vaucluse, France. They played at the Stade de Montbord in Le Pontet until dissolution in 2021.

== History ==
The club was formed in 1980 under the name of Olympique Pontétien. It was not until 1984 that they changed their name to Union Sportive Le Pontet Football. Under the US Le Pontet sports club, the football section was one of eight sports offered. In May 2017 the club voted to rename US Pontet Grand Avignon 84. Elements of the team merged with Athlétic Club Vedène to form Athlétic Club Vedène Le Pontet in 2020 in face of financial pressure from the Le Pontet municipality. In 2021 the multi-sports club dissolved including the football section as a result of the financial situation.

== Notable players ==
- (France) Joris Chotard (youth)
