= RC Pays de Grasse =

French football club

Pays de Grasse
- Full name: Racing Club Pays de Grasse
- Founded: 1950
- Ground: Stade de la Paoute, Grasse
- Capacity: 3500
- Chairman: François Roustan
- Manager: Loic Chabas
- League: National 1
- 2025–26: National 2 Group C, 10th of 16 (excluded)
- Website: https://www.rcgrasse.fr
Home colours	Away colours

Racing Club Pays de Grasse is a French association football club founded in 1959. Until 2022 they were known as Racing Club de Grasse. They are based in the town of Grasse and their home stadium is the Stade Jean Girard. Since the 2017–18 season, they play in the Championnat National 1.

== History ==
RC Grasse was formed in 1950 as a result of the merger of two clubs, Gallia Club Grasse and Red Star Grasse. The club played for more than 30 years in the regional league of the Mediterranean. They were first promoted to the national competitions in 1983, taking a place in 1983–84 Division 4, where they only missed out on a further promotion on the last day of the season.

The club remained at the fourth level of French football for six seasons, being relegated back to the regional league in 1989.

A second promotion to the national competitions was achieved in 1992, and the club took a place in 1992–93 Division 4. At the end of the season the FFF reorganised the league, and the club were placed at level five, in National 3. After one season in this competition, they were again relegated back to the regional leagues.

The club did not gain a third promotion until 2009, when they took a place in 2009–10 Championnat de France amateur 2. They spent four seasons before returning to the regional league in 2013.

In 2016 the club gained a fourth promotion to the national leagues, taking a place in 2016–17 Championnat de France Amateur 2. For the first time they won promotion in a national division, and as of the 2017–18 season they play in Championnat National 2.

In July 2021, the club changed its name from Racing Club de Grasse to Racing Club Pays de Grasse, to illustrate its representation of the Pays de Grasse agglomeration of communities.

== Current squad ==
As of 28 Feb 2023

Note: Flags indicate national team as defined under FIFA eligibility rules; some limited exceptions apply. Players may hold more than one non-FIFA nationality.

No.	Pos.	Nation	Player
2	DF	FRA	Vincent Muratori
3	MF	FRA	Azihard M'Changama
4	DF	FRA	Youssef Gazzaoui
7	DF	FRA	Axel Aymeric Gnapi Dable
8	MF	FRA	Herman Ako
9	FW	FRA	Tony Badalassi
10	DF	FRA	Maxime Corain
13	FW	FRA	Paulin Puel
14	DF	FRA	Kévin Châtelain
15	MF	FRA	Loïc Marin
16	DF	FRA	Sahmkou Camara
17	MF	FRA	Alexis Fernandez

No.	Pos.	Nation	Player
18	FW	FRA	Paul Grandemange
19	MF	CPV	Amara Djelassi
20	FW	FRA	Yacine Atarsia
21	FW	FRA	Stanley Lahoues
23	FW	FRA	Dame Gueye
26	MF	FRA	Sebastien Amoros
28	MF	MCO	Florian Antognelli
29	FW	FRA	Aymen Souda
30	GK	FRA	Amaury Roperti
33	DF	FRA	Grégory Rolando
39	MF	FRA	Nicolas Medjian
40	GK	FRA	Florian Camus

== Notable former players ==
- Paul Bahoken
- Stéphane Bahoken
- Julien Berthomier
- Laurent Charvet
- Laurent Leroy
- Yoann Touzghar
- Thomas Pinault
- Niall Bromley

== Honours ==
- Championnat de France Amateur 2
  - Group winner: 2017
- Division d'Honneur
  - Mediterranean region champion: 1983, 1992, 2009, 2016
