= SC Draguignan =

French football team based in Draguignan

Sporting Club de Draguignan
- Short name: SC Draguignan
- Founded: 1941
- Ground: Raoul Brulat
- Website: https://scd.sportsregions.fr/

Sporting Club de Draguignan is a French football team based in Draguignan. They competed in the Coupe de France round of 32 in 1950–51, 1952–53, 1954–55, and the round of 16 in 1958–59.
