= ES Cannet Rocheville =

Football club based in Le Cannet, France

Cannet Rocheville
- Full name: Entente Sportive Cannet Rocheville Football
- Short name: ESCR
- Founded: 1968
- Stadium: Stade Maillan
- Capacity: 1,000
- Manager: Farid Tabet
- League: National 3 Group A
- 2022–23: National 3 Group D, 8th
- Website: https://escrfoot.footeo.com/

Entente Sportive Cannet Rocheville Football is a football club based in Le Cannet, France. The club plays its home games at the Stade Maillan and competes in the Championnat National 3, the fifth tier of French football, as of the 2021–22 season. White and green are the club's colours.

== History ==
The club was founded in 1968 following a merger of Sporting Club du Cannet and Association Sportive Rochevilloise.

Cannet Rocheville's first appearance in the Coupe de France proper came in the 2021–22 edition of the competition. The club won against Istres and Bastia-Borgo in the seventh and eighth rounds before being drawn against Ligue 1 giants Marseille in the round of 64. ESCR's sporting director and assistant coach Christian Lopez reacted to the draw by saying that it was "fantastic" for the club. The match, held at the Stade Vélodrome, ended in a 4–1 victory for Marseille.

== Honours ==
ES Cannet Rocheville honours
Honour	No.	Years
Régional 1 Méditerranée	2	2014–15, 2019–20
