= Gardanne Biver FC =

Football club in Gardanne, France

- Full name: Gardanne Biver Football Club
- Founded: 1921
- Ground: Stade Victor Savine, Gardanne
- Capacity: 3,000
- Chairman: Jean-Claude Valéra
- League: Régional 2 (level 7)
- Website: https://gardanne-biver-f-c.footeo.com

Gardanne Biver Football Club is a French association football club created in 2017 by a merger of Avenir Sporting Gardannais and local neighbours Biver Sports. It is based in the town of Gardanne and its stadium is the Stade Victor Savine. as of the 2018–19 season, the club plays in the Régional 2 division of the Ligue Méditerranée, level 7 of the French football league system.

== History ==
The new club traces its roots back to 1921, when Avenir Sporting Gardannais were formed. The club became notable in the 1959–60 season when it progressed to the round of 16 of the Coupe de France, beating Toulouse FC in the round of 32, before eventually losing to Lille OSC.

Having narrowly missed out on qualification for access to third division of French football in season 1977–78, the club was a founder member of the fourth division in 1978–79. It stayed at this level for five seasons, before suffering a series of relegations to spend a season in District level football in 1994. By the turn of the 21st Century the club had recovered to the top level of regional football, and in 2007 won promotion to the fifth level Championnat de France Amateur 2.

The club played in CFA2 for five seasons, being relegated back to Regional football at the end of the 2011–12 season. In 2017 the club announced a merger with local neighbours Biver Sports.
