= 2017–18 Coupe de France preliminary rounds, Méditerranée =

French football competition

The 2017–18 Coupe de France preliminary rounds, Méditerranée make up the qualifying competition to decide which teams from the French Méditerranée region take part in the main competition from the seventh round.

== First round ==
The matches in Méditerranée were played on 26 and 27 August 2017.

First round results: Méditerranée

Tie no	Home team (tier)	Score	Away team (tier)
1.	Espérance Gordienne (11)	2–1	JS Lourmarin (10)
2.	Olympique Eyraguais (11)	1–5	US Eygalières (9)
3.	FC Bonnieux (11)	1–5	AC Vedene (8)
4.	ACS Morières (10)	0–6	ARC Cavaillon (8)
5.	AS Piolençoise (10)	1–11	Boxeland Club Islois (8)
6.	AS Rasteau (10)	1–3	Calavon FC (9)
7.	Avenir Club Avignonnais (10)	1–2	Dentelles FC (9)
8.	AS Camaretois (10)	1–3	Espérance Sorguaise (8)
9.	ES Pierredon Mouriès (10)	1–7	ES Boulbon (8)
10.	FC Cheval Blanc (10)	2–6	FA Châteaurenard (9)
11.	FC Vignères (10)	1–3	FC Carpentras (8)
12.	Oppède-Maubec-Luberon (10)	2–3	JS Visannaise (9)
13.	RC Provence (10)	1–1 (4–5 p)	Étoile d'Aubune (9)
14.	SC Mondragon (10)	0–5	Olympic Barbentane (8)
15.	SC Rognonas (10)	0–4	Olympique Novais (8)
16.	US Thoroise (10)	2–0	SO Velleron (9)
17.	US Caderousse (10)	0–6	SC Gadagnien (9)
18.	US Valreas (10)	1–3	SC Jonquières (8)
19.	US St Saturninoise (10)	1–7	SC Montfavet (8)
20.	AS Violès (9)	1–3 (a.e.t.)	SC Orange (8)
21.	FC Luberon (9)	0–3	USR Pertuis (9)
22.	Tarascon FC (9)	4–1	US St Didier (9)
23.	Olympique Montelais (9)	1–0	US Avignonnais (8)
24.	FC Islois (11)	4–5	US Autre Provence (9)
25.	ES Banonaise (10)	0–8	US Veynes-Serres (7)
26.	AS Valensole Gréoux (9)	1–2	FC Céreste-Reillanne(9)
27.	Olympique Briançon-Serre-Chevalier (9)	1–2	AFC Ste Tulle-Pierrevert (8)
28.	Oraison Sports (8)	2–2 (2–4 p)	CA Digne 04 (8)
29.	FC Sisteron (8)	2–4	EP Manosque (8)
30.	US Val d'Issole (11)	0–10	SO Londais (8)
31.	AS Brignoles (10)	2–1	US Pradet (8)
32.	FC Belgentier (10)	1–7	US Cuers-Pierrefeu (8)
33.	SC Plantourian (10)	1–3	SO Lavandou (8)
34.	US Pignans (10)	1–3	SC Cogolin (8)
35.	US Sanary (10)	2–3	Olympique St Maximinois (8)
36.	US St Mandrier (9)	2–2 (6–5 p)	Gardia Club (8)
37.	ES Solliès-Farlède (9)	1–2	FCUS Tropézienne (8)
38.	FC Vidauban (9)	0–4	FC Ramatuelle (8)
39.	FC Pugetois (9)	1–0	FC Pays de Fayence (9)
40.	ES Lorguaise (9)	1–2	FC Grimaud (9)
41.	CA Cannetois (9)	1–4	AS Estérel (8)
42.	Bormes Mimomas Sports (9)	3–0	AS St Cyr (9)
43.	AS Arcoise (9)	3–5	ES St Zacharie (7)
44.	Mayotte FC 06 (12)	0–15	Trinité Sport Football Club (8)
45.	SO Roquettan (12)	2–3	AS Fontonne (8)
46.	AS Traminots Alpes Maritimes (11)	3–2	AS Moulins (9)
47.	ASPTT Nice (11)	0–5	AS Roquebrune-Cap-Martin (8)
48.	ES Haute Siagne (11)	3–2	AS Vence (8)
49.	Entente St Roche-Vieux Nice (11)	0–4	CJ Antibes (8)
50.	Étoile Menton (11)	0–1	Entente St Sylvestre Nice Nord (8)
51.	FC Golfe-Juan (11)	2–4	FC Beausoleil (9)
52.	OC Blausasc (11)	3–2	FC Antibes (8)
53.	FC Carros (8)	2–1	St Paul CO Collois (11)
54.	US Biot (11)	1–4	FC Mougins Côte d'Azur (8)
55.	AS Roquefort (10)	0–1	US Valbonne Sophia Antipolis (9)
56.	Drap Football (10)	3–2	Montet Bornala Club Nice (9)
57.	EC Madeleine Victorine (10)	2–3	SC Mouans-Sartoux (7)
58.	ES Villeneuve-Loubet (10)	1–4	Stade Laurentin (8)
59.	Stade Vallauris (10)	2–2 (4–3 p)	US Cannes Bocca Olympique (9)
60.	CA Peymeinade (9)	1–1 (5–3 p)	US Pegomas (7)
61.	ES Baous (9)	1–3	ES Contoise (10)
62.	US Entraigues (9)	0–2	Stade Maillanais (7)
63.	AS Helvétique (10)	2–1	AS Martigues Sud (8)
64.	AS Coudoux (11)	1–4	US Venelles (9)
65.	AS Ste Marguerite (11)	2–3	AS Busserine (8)
66.	Aix Université CF (10)	0–8	FSC La Ciotat (8)
67.	Burel FC (10)	0–6	FC Septèmes (9)
68.	CA Croix Sainte (10)	1–6	AC Port-de-Bouc (7)
69.	FC Chateauneuf-les-Martigues (10)	2–4	AS Simiane-Collongue (9)
70.	FC Istres Rassuen (10)	0–3 (Note: Forfeit)	Olympique Mallemortais (9)
71.	FC Rognes (10)	1–6	AS Rognac (9)
72.	FC St Victoret (10)	1–4	Étoile Huveaune (8)
73.	FO Ventabren (10)	0–1 (a.e.t.)	FC Seynois (8)
74.	JS Pennes Mirabeau (9)	1–0	CA Plan-de-Cuques (8)
75.	SC St Cannat (10)	1–4	SC Montredon Bonneveine (9)
76.	SC St Martinois (10)	0–1	JS St Julien (9)
77.	US Éguillenne (10)	1–5	Luynes Sports (8)
78.	US Farenque (10)	0–2	ES Milloise (9)
79.	USPEG Marseille (10)	0–5	AS Mazargues (9)
80.	Pays d'Aix FC (10)	0–1	AS Bouc Bel Air (9)
81.	FC St Mitre-les-Ramparts (10)	1–4	US Trets (9)
82.	US Plan de Grasse (8)	2–0	Six-Fours Le Brusc FC (7)
83.	AS Mar Vivo (9)	0–6	CA Gombertois (7)
84.	JO St Gabriel (9)	3–0	JS Istreenne (10)
85.	FC La Ciotat-Ceyreste (10)	3–0 (Note: FC Algerien penalised (reason unknown). FC La Ciotat-Ceyreste qualify for the second round. Original scoreline 4–4 (5–6 p))	FC Algerien (10)
86.	USC Minots du Panier (8)	2–1	ASCJ Félix Pyat (9)

== Second round ==
These matches were played on 3 September 2017.

Second round results: Méditerranée

Tie no	Home team (tier)	Score	Away team (tier)
1.	FC La Ciotat-Ceyreste (10)	0–2	US 1er Canton Marseille (7)
2.	Luynes Sports (8)	0–3	CA Gombertois (7)
3.	AS Busserine (8)	0–4	AC Port-de-Bouc (7)
4.	FC Septèmes (9)	0–4	FC Istres (6)
5.	US Venelles (9)	0–3	Olympique Mallemortais (9)
6.	AS Helvétique (10)	2–1	Gardanne Biver FC (7)
7.	US Autre Provence (9)	0–1	Espérance Gordienne (11)
8.	SC Orange (8)	1–0	USR Pertuis (9)
9.	SC Montfavet (8)	3–2 (a.e.t.)	Tarascon FC (9)
10.	SC Jonquières (8)	4–2	US Thoroise (10)
11.	SC Gadagnien (9)	2–1	FA Val Durance (7)
12.	Olympic Barbentane (8)	2–1 (a.e.t.)	ES Boulbon (8)
13.	Étoile d'Aubune (9)	0–1	Espérance Pernoise (6)
14.	ES Milloise (9)	1–2	AC Arlésien (6)
15.	AS Simiane-Collongue (9)	3–4 (a.e.t.)	AS Rognac (9)
16.	FSC La Ciotat (8)	0–3	ES Fosséenne (7)
17.	FC Céreste-Reillanne (9)	3–1 (a.e.t.)	AFC Ste Tulle-Pierrevert (8)
18.	FC Seynois (8)	3–1	US Plan de Grasse (8)
19.	USC Minots du Panier (8)	0–1	Olympique Rovenain (7)
20.	JO St Gabriel (9)	0–1 (a.e.t.)	FC Côte Bleue (6)
21.	US Trets (9)	1–3	Carnoux FC (6)
22.	AS Bouc Bel Air (9)	0–3	Salon Bel Air (6)
23.	AS Mazargues (9)	2–5	FC Rousset Ste Victoire (7)
24.	JS St Julien (9)	0–2	EUGA Ardziv (6)
25.	SC Montredon Bonneveine (9)	0–3	Stade Marseillais UC (7)
26.	JS Pennes Mirabeau (9)	1–3	Berre SC (7)
27.	Étoile Huveaune (8)	1–2	ES La Ciotat (7)
28.	JS Visannaise (9)	2–1	Olympique Novais (8)
29.	FC Carpentras (8)	4–2	Dentelles FC (9)
30.	AS Fontonne (8)	0–1 (a.e.t.)	FC Beausoleil (9)
31.	Trinité Sport Football Club (8)	3–1	SC Mouans-Sartoux (7)
32.	US Cuers-Pierrefeu (8)	0–1	RO Menton (6)
33.	FC Pugetois (9)	1–4	SC Dracénie (7)
34.	SO Londais (8)	1–4	AS Maximoise (6)
35.	FC Grimaud (9)	2–3	Bormes Mimomas Sports (9)
36.	FC Ramatuelle (8)	0–1	US Carqueiranne-La Crau (6)
37.	Olympique St Maximinois (8)	1–2	US St Mandrier (9)
38.	SC Cogolin (8)	2–3	AS Estérel (8)
39.	SO Lavandou (8)	0–2	FCUS Tropézienne (8)
40.	AS Brignoles (10)	0–2	UA Valettoise (7)
41.	EP Manosque (8)	1–2	Gap Foot 05 (7)
42.	AS Traminots Alpes Maritimes (11)	0–2	AS Cagnes-Le Cros (7)
43.	OC Blausasc (11)	2–3	AS Roquebrune-Cap-Martin (8)
44.	FA Châteaurenard (9)	3–4	ARC Cavaillon (8)
45.	Espérance Sorguaise (8)	2–1 (a.e.t.)	Olympique Montelais (9)
46.	Calavon FC (9)	2–3	Stade Maillanais (7)
47.	AC Vedene (8)	2–1	SC Courthézon (7)
48.	US Eygalières (9)	5–4	Boxeland Club Islois (8)
49.	ES Contoise (10)	0–4	ES St Zacharie (7)
50.	Stade Vallauris (10)	3–1	CA Peymeinade (9)
51.	Drap Football (10)	0–3	US Valbonne Sophia Antipolis (9)
52.	FC Mougins Côte d'Azur (8)	1–1 (7–6 p)	FC Carros (8)
53.	Entente St Sylvestre Nice Nord (8)	0–3	US Cap d'Ail (7)
54.	CJ Antibes (8)	1–3	US Mandelieu-La Napoule (7)
55.	ES Haute Siagne (11)	2–5	Stade Laurentin (8)
56.	CA Digne 04 (8)	1–5	US Veynes-Serres (7)

== Third round ==
These matches were played on 9 and 10 September 2017.

Third round results: Méditerranée

Tie no	Home team (tier)	Score	Away team (tier)
1.	Espérance Gordienne (11)	1–5	FC Côte Bleue (6)
2.	SC Jonquières (8)	0–7	US Marseille Endoume (5)
3.	US Valbonne Sophia Antipolis (9)	0–2	US Carqueiranne-La Crau (6)
4.	ARC Cavaillon (8)	3–2	Salon Bel Air (6)
5.	FC Beausoleil (9)	2–4 (a.e.t.)	ES La Ciotat (7)
6.	ES St Zacharie (7)	1–1 (2–4 p)	AS Gémenos (5)
7.	Stade Laurentin (8)	4–5	Trinité Sport Football Club (8)
8.	AS Maximoise (6)	3–4 (a.e.t.)	FC Rousset Ste Victoire (7)
9.	AS Helvétique (10)	3–2	FC Mougins Côte d'Azur (8)
10.	Bormes Mimomas Sports (9)	4–0	US St Mandrier (9)
11.	UA Valettoise (7)	1–0	Carnoux FC (6)
12.	AS Roquebrune-Cap-Martin (8)	2–2 (3–5 p)	EUGA Ardziv (6)
13.	FC Céreste-Reillanne (9)	0–2	RO Menton (6)
14.	US Mandelieu-La Napoule (7)	3–1	SC Dracénie (7)
15.	FCUS Tropézienne (8)	0–1	US Cap d'Ail (7)
16.	AS Cagnes-Le Cros (7)	3–2	FC Seynois (8)
17.	AS Estérel (8)	0–4	ES Cannet Rocheville (5)
18.	Stade Vallauris (10)	0–3	Villefranche Saint-Jean Beaulieu FC (5)
19.	SC Gadagnien (9)	1–0	AS Saint-Rémoise (5)
20.	FC Carpentras (8)	6–2	US Eygalières (9)
21.	Stade Maillanais (7)	1–1 (1–3 p)	Olympique Rovenain (7)
22.	JS Visannaise (9)	0–4	ES Fosséenne (7)
23.	AS Rognac (9)	1–8	FC Istres (6)
24.	AC Vedene (8)	2–3 (a.e.t.)	SC Montfavet (8)
25.	CA Gombertois (7)	0–0 (2–4 p)	Olympic Barbentane (8)
26.	US 1er Canton Marseille (7)	3–0	Espérance Sorguaise (8)
27.	Berre SC (7)	0–1	SC Orange (8)
28.	Olympique Mallemortais (9)	1–3	AC Port-de-Bouc (7)
29.	AC Arlésien (6)	0–1	Aubagne FC (5)
30.	Stade Marseillais UC (7)	2–1	US Pontet Grand Avignon 84 (5)
31.	Espérance Pernoise (6)	2–0	US Veynes-Serres (7)
32.	Gap Foot 05 (7)	2–3 (a.e.t.)	AS Cannes (5)

== Fourth round ==
These matches were played on 22, 23 and 24 September 2017.

Fourth round results: Méditerranée

Tie no	Home team (tier)	Score	Away team (tier)
1.	FC Martigues (4)	3–1	RC Grasse (4)
2.	UA Valettoise (7)	0–3	Aubagne FC (5)
3.	Marignane Gignac F.C. (4)	0–1 (a.e.t.)	Sporting Club Toulon (4)
4.	ES La Ciotat (7)	1–3	Espérance Pernoise (6)
5.	ES Cannet Rocheville (5)	3–4 (a.e.t.)	RO Menton (6)
6.	AS Helvétique (10)	1–3	AS Cagnes-Le Cros (7)
7.	US Cap d'Ail (7)	1–1 (5–4 p)	FC Rousset Ste Victoire (7)
8.	US 1er Canton Marseille (7)	0–1	AS Gémenos (5)
9.	SC Gadagnien (9)	0–5	Étoile Fréjus Saint-Raphaël (4)
10.	AS Cannes (5)	2–0	FC Istres (6)
11.	ES Fosséenne (7)	3–1	Villefranche Saint-Jean Beaulieu FC (5)
12.	FC Côte Bleue (6)	1–0	Olympique Rovenain (7)
13.	US Mandelieu-La Napoule (7)	0–1	Hyères FC (4)
14.	SC Montfavet (8)	2–3	ARC Cavaillon (8)
15.	SC Orange (8)	3–4 (a.e.t.)	FC Carpentras (8)
16.	Bormes Mimomas Sports (9)	2–1 (a.e.t.)	US Carqueiranne-La Crau (6)
17.	AC Port-de-Bouc (7)	0–2 (a.e.t.)	EUGA Ardziv (6)
18.	Trinité Sport Football Club (8)	0–1	US Marseille Endoume (5)
19.	Olympic Barbentane (8)	1–2	Stade Marseillais UC (7)

== Fifth round ==
These matches were played on 7 and 8 October 2017.

Fifth round results: Méditerranée

Tie no	Home team (tier)	Score	Away team (tier)
1.	US Marseille Endoume (5)	1–0	Aubagne FC (5)
2.	Marseille Consolat (3)	3–3 (7–6 p)	Étoile Fréjus Saint-Raphaël (4)
3.	ARC Cavaillon (8)	2–1 (a.e.t.)	RO Menton (6)
4.	AS Cannes (5)	1–2	FC Martigues (4)
5.	ES Fosséenne (7)	1–2	Sporting Club Toulon (4)
6.	FC Carpentras (8)	0–1	AS Gémenos (5)
7.	Bormes Mimomas Sports (9)	0–2	Hyères FC (4)
8.	EUGA Ardziv (6)	4–0	US Cap d'Ail (7)
9.	AS Cagnes-Le Cros (7)	2–1	FC Côte Bleue (6)
10.	Espérance Pernoise (6)	1–2 (a.e.t.)	Stade Marseillais UC (7)

== Sixth round ==
These matches were played on 21 and 22 October 2017.

Sixth round results: Méditerranée

Tie no	Home team (tier)	Score	Away team (tier)
1.	AS Gémenos (5)	1–0	Sporting Club Toulon (4)
2.	ARC Cavaillon (8)	2–6	Marseille Consolat (3)
3.	Hyères FC (4)	0–0 (3–4 p)	FC Martigues (4)
4.	Stade Marseillais UC (7)	0–1	AS Cagnes-Le Cros (7)
5.	US Marseille Endoume (5)	2–1	EUGA Ardziv (6)
