= 2024–25 Coupe de France preliminary rounds, Méditerranée =

The 2024–25 Coupe de France preliminary rounds, Méditerranée was the qualifying competition to decide which teams from the leagues of the Méditerranée region of France took part in the main competition from the seventh round.

A total of six teams qualified from the Méditerranée preliminary rounds.

In 2023–24, FC Martigues and AS Cannes both progressed to the eighth round, before losing out to opposition from lower leagues. Martigues were defeated 1–2 at home by Olympique Alès and Cannes lost on penalties after a 2–2 draw against Régional 1 side AS Fabrègues.

== Draws and fixtures ==
The first round draw was published on 29 July 2024, with 68 ties consisting of teams from the District level leagues, with 30 of these teams receiving byes to the second round. The second round draw was published on 27 August 2024, with the remaining clubs from the District leagues and the clubs from the Regional level leagues all entering.

The third round draw, featuring the entry of the five clubs from Championnat National 3 was streamed live on the league's YouTube channel on 4 September 2024. The fourth round draw, featuring the entry of the seven clubs from Championnat National 2 was published on 19 September 2024. The fifth round draw, featuring the entry of the single Championnat National team from the region, was streamed live on the league's YouTube channel, on 1 October 2024. The sixth round draw was published on 17 October 2024.

The structuring of the rounds indicated that a total of 231 teams from the region entered the competition, including the four clubs from Ligue 1 and Ligue 2.

=== First round ===
These matches were played on 24 and 25 August 2024.

First Round Results: Méditerranée
Tie no	Home team (Tier)	Score	Away team (Tier)
1.	US Caderousse (11)	1–2	US Planaise (10)
2.	FC Aureille (11)	2–4	Boxeland Club Islois (11)
3.	SO Mornas (12)	2–2 (4–2 p)	Stade Cabannais (11)
4.	FC Golfe-Juan (13)	2–2 (4–5 p)	SO Roquettan (11)
5.	US Valbonne Sophia Antipolis (9)	4–1	Stade Vallauris (9)
6.	US Biot (11)	0–3 (Note: Tie won by means of forfeit.)	Montet Bornala Club de Nice (10)
7.	SC Saint-Martinois (9)	0–0(4–5 p)	SC Allauch (9)
8.	US Pélican (11)	0–0 (3–4 p)	US Tramways Marseille (11)
9.	FC Céreste-Reillanne (9)	3–6	US Farenque (10)
10.	Étoile de Menton (10)	0–2	US Cap d'Ail (9)
11.	FC Lançonnais (11)	5–1	JSA Saint-Antoine (11)
12.	OC Blausasc (12)	0–1	FC Cimiez (11)
13.	FC Euro African (10)	4–2	US Cannes Bocca Olympique (9)
14.	Étoile Huveaune (10)	5–3	AAS Val Saint-André (9)
15.	FA Châteaurenard (10)	3–0	US Lapalud (11)
16.	Entente Pivotte Serinette (11)	0–5	AS Mar Vivo (10)
17.	FC Mollégès Eygalières (10)	0–4	Maison Jenuesse et Club du Vaucluse (10)
18.	Tarascon SC (11)	5–2	Travaillan FC (11)
19.	Réveil Grozeau Malaucène (10)	11–0	OM Luberon (11)
20.	FC Saint-Mitre-les-Remparts (10)	2–1	JS Pennes Mirabeau (10)
21.	US Miramas (10)	2–4	Saint-Henri FC (11)
22.	SC Frais Vallon (9)	5–0	AS Aix-en-Provence (9)
23.	ÉS Port-Saint-Louis-du-Rhône (10)	0–3 (Note: ÉS Port-Saint-Louis-du-Rhône penalised, FO Ventabren qualify. Original result unknown.)	FO Ventabren (10)
24.	ES Bassin Minier (11)	1–2	FC Châteauneuf La Mède (10)
25.	ES Cuges (11)	1–0	FC Saint-Victoret (10)
26.	US Sanary (10)	0–1	US Ollioulaise (10)
27.	CA Roquebrunois (10)	0–3	ES Lorguaise (10)
28.	FC Lavandou Bormes (10)	0–0 (4–3 p)	SC Tourvain (11)
29.	FC Belgentier (11)	0–3	CA Cannetois (10)
30.	SC Barjols (11)	3–4	AC Toulonnais (12)
31.	USPEG Marseille (none)	3–2	SS Saint-Chamas (11)
32.	FC Cheval Blanc (10)	0–0 (2–4 p)	US Touraine (11)
33.	US Vivo 04 (9)	3–3 (4–2 p)	US Velauxienne (11)
34.	CA Peymeinade (10)	1–1 (4–3 p)	ES des Baous (9)
35.	AS Piolenc (10)	4–2	CS Sarrians (11)
36.	CAS Eaux Nice (10)	3–0	AS Saint-Martin-du-Var (11)
37.	Barcelonnette FC (10)	2–5	US Châteauneuf Aubignosc Peipin (10)
38.	FC Saint-Rémy (10)	9–0	Entente Fontvieille-Raphèle-Moulès (12)
39.	US Veynes-Serres (10)	5–0	Argentière Sport Les Écrins (10)
40.	JS Visannaise (12)	0–4	Espérance Sorguaise (9)
41.	Bollène Foot (12)	0–10	Dentelles FC (11)
42.	Gazélec Sports Nice (11)	1–0	Tourrettes-sur-Loup Football(12)
43.	Avenir Simiane Bouc-Bel-Air (10)	2–8	US Saint-Barthélemy Marseillais (10)
44.	SC Mondragon (11)	6–3	Olympique Novais (11)
45.	Drap Football (11)	3–0	AS Traminots Alpes Maritimes (12)
46.	Gapeau FC (9)	1–1 (3–4 p) (Note: Tie reversed from original draw.)	JS Berthe (9)
47.	Calavon FC (10)	1–2	RC Provence (10)
48.	US Thoroise (11)	0–7	Stade Maillanais (10)
49.	EJGC Graveson (10)	5–0	Espérance Gordienne (10)
50.	Olympique Eyraguais (10)	5–1	SC Luberon (11)
51.	FC Vignères (11)	0–2	FC Villeneuve (10)
52.	JS Istréenne (10)	1–0	USM Meyreuil (10)
53.	FC Fuveau Provence (11)	1–2	Grand Saint Barthelemy Omnisports (10)
54.	US 1er Canton Marseille (10)	0–1	US Venelles (9)
55.	AS Coudoux (11)	3–5	AS Rognac (10)
56.	AS Saint-Cyr (10)	8–0	AS Signes (11)
57.	FC Grimaud (11)	1–2	FC Pays du Fayence (11)
58.	US Val d'Issole (11)	2–0	SC Cogolin (10)
59.	AS Sainte-Marguerite (11)	2–4	CA Plan-de-Cuques (10)
60.	JS Beaussetanne (11)	0–5	FC Pugetois (10)
61.	AS Marseillaise Saint-Loup 10ème (11)	3–4	Burel FC (10)
62.	FC Vidauban (10)	4–3	SC Plantourian (10)
63.	SO Velleronnais (10)	0–2	ACS Morières (10)
64.	US Grès Orange Sud (11)	0–3	FC Carpentras (11)
65.	US Puyricard (11)	2–2 (4–2 p)	SO Septèmes (11)
66.	ÉS Saint-André (11)	3–0	Olympique Suquetan Cannes Croisette (12)
67.	FC Carros (10)	7–2	Peille FC (12)
68.	FC Antibes (10)	0–1	AS Valleroise (10)

=== Second round ===
These matches were played on 1 September 2024, with weather-related replays on 4 and 7 September 2024.

Second Round Results: Méditerranée
Tie no	Home team (Tier)	Score	Away team (Tier)
1.	US Marseille Endoume (7)	1–1 (5–4 p)	FC Septèmes Consolat (7)
2.	CA Plan-de-Cuques (10)	1–5	AS Mazargues (9)
3.	US Saint-Barthélemy Marseillais (10)	0–6	Carnoux FC (6)
4.	SC Frais Vallon (9)	1–3	SC Cayolle (7)
5.	FC Châteauneuf La Mède (10)	4–2	US Puyricard (11)
6.	Burel FC (10)	4–1	FC Saint-Mitre-les-Remparts (10)
7.	SC Allauch (9)	1–0	USPEG Marseille (none)
8.	Étoile Huveaune (10)	1–1 (4–5 p)	Luynes Sports (6)
9.	Saint-Henri FC (11)	3–3 (11–12 p)	Salon Bel Air (7)
10.	Grand Saint Barthelemy Omnisports (10)	2–6	AS Gémenos (6)
11.	AS Martigues Sud (7)	6–0	ES Milloise (7)
12.	US Tramways Marseille (11)	0–9	AC Arlésien (6)
13.	ES Cuges (11)	0–2	SC Montredon Bonneveine (7)
14.	AS Rognac (10)	0–12	Berre SC (7)
15.	FO Ventabren (10)	0–3	Stade Marseillais UC (6)
16.	FC Lançonnais (11)	2–2 (5–6 p)	JS Istréenne (10)
17.	FC Seynois (9)	1–5	Six-Fours Le Brusc FC (6)
18.	US Ollioulaise (10)	0–2	Gardia Club (8)
19.	US Saint-Mandrier (9)	3–3 (4–5 p)	SC Nansais (9)
20.	SC Draguignan (9)	2–1	SO Londais (8)
21.	US La Cadière (9)	0–3	FC Ramatuelle (7)
22.	UA Valettoise (7)	1–2	Tremplin FC (7)
23.	US Cuers-Pierrefeu (8)	0–4	US Carqueiranne-La Crau (7)
24.	AS Estérel (8)	1–0	RC La Baie (9)
25.	AS Mar Vivo (10)	1–4	FCUS Tropézienne (7)
26.	ES Lorguaise (10)	2–0	FC Vidauban (10)
27.	AC Toulonnais (12)	0–1	AS Saint-Cyr (10)
28.	FC Pugetois (10)	1–1 (6–7 p)	AS Maximoise (6)
29.	FC Lavandou Bormes (10)	0–1	ES La Ciotat (8)
30.	ASPTT Toulon Hospitalier (9)	1–1 (7–8 p)	AS Brignoles (8)
31.	FC Pays du Fayence (11)	1–3	US Val d'Issole (11)
32.	SO Mornas (12)	1–5	FC Saint-Rémy (10)
33.	Ventoux Sud FC (9)	1–0	ES Boulbon (10)
34.	RC Provence (10)	2–2 (5–4 p)	Espérance Sorguaise (9)
35.	Dentelles FC (11)	2–0	US Touraine (11)
36.	Avenir Goult Roussillon (9)	1–1 (2–4 p)	US Planaise (10)
37.	FC Sisteron (9)	2–1	US Farenque (10)
38.	US Veynes-Serres (10)	1–0	Gap Foot 05 (8)
39.	SC Gadagne (9)	1–1 (4–2 p)	EJGC Graveson (10)
40.	EM Angloise (7)	2–0	AC Le Pontet-Vedène (6)
41.	AS Camaretois (9)	1–0	ARC Cavaillon (9)
42.	AS Forcalquier (9)	2–2 (3–1 p)	CA Digne 04 (9)
43.	CDJ Antibes (9)	5–1 (Note: Tie reversed from original draw.)	ÉS Saint-André (11)
44.	FC Euro African (10)	2–4	US Mandelieu-La Napoule (6)
45.	US Valbonne Sophia Antipolis (9)	3–3 (Note: FC Beausoleil penalised for fielding a suspended player, US Valbonne Sophia Antipolis qualify.)	FC Beausoleil (6)
46.	FC Mougins Côte d'Azur (7)	4–0	AS Fontonne Antibes (7)
47.	AS Cagnes-Le Cros (6)	2–1	SC Mouans-Sartoux (7)
48.	Boxeland Club Islois (11)	1–2 (Note: SC Montfavet penalised for an administrative error, Boxeland Club Islois qualify.)	SC Montfavet (9)
49.	SC Mondragon (11)	2–3	Olympique Eyraguais (10)
50.	Olympique Montelais (8)	1–3 (Note: FA Val Durance penalised, Olympique Montelais qualify.)	FA Val Durance (7)
51.	RCB Bollène (9)	3–4	FA Châteaurenard (10)
52.	US Autre Provence (9)	2–5	FC Villeneuve (10)
53.	Laragne Sports (9)	1–11	EP Manosque (7)
54.	FC Avignon (7)	0–3	USR Pertuis (7)
55.	Stade Maillanais (10)	1–3	Sporting Courthézon Jonquières (7)
56.	Tarascon SC (11)	0–3	Saint-Didier Espérance Pernoise (7)
57.	Réveil Grozeau Malaucène (10)	3–1	US Avignonnaise (9)
58.	US Venelles (9)	1–4	Olympique Barbentane (8)
59.	ACS Morières (10)	0–0 (3–4 p)	AS Piolenc (10)
60.	AS Roquefort (9)	0–1	AS Roquebrune-Cap-Martin (9)
61.	Drap Football (11)	0–4	AS Vence (7)
62.	AS Valleroise (10)	2–0	SO Roquettan (11)
63.	US Cap d'Ail (9)	0–2	RO Menton (9)
64.	Gazélec Sports Nice (11)	0–3	US Pegomas (7)
65.	FC Carpentras (11)	4–0	Maison Jenuesse et Club du Vaucluse (10)
66.	CAS Eaux Nice (10)	1–4	Entente Saint-Sylvestre Nice Nord (7)
67.	Montet Bornala Club de Nice (10)	3–1	CA Peymeinade (10)
68.	US Pradet (9)	2–1	Olympique Saint-Maximinois (7)
69.	CA Cannetois (10)	1–2	JS Berthe (9)
70.	FC Carros (10)	2–3	FC Cimiez (11)
71.	AFC Sainte-Tulle-Pierrevert (9)	1–5 (Note: Original match on 1 September 2024 was abandoned due to a storm. The match was replayed on 4 September 2024.)	US Moyenne Durance (7)
72.	US Châteauneuf Aubignosc Peipin (10)	1–2 (Note: It is assumed that this game, which took place on 4 September 2024, was a replay of a game abandoned on 1 September 2024.)	AS Valensole Gréoux (9)
73.	SC Vinonnais (8)	3–1 (Note: Original match on 1 September 2024 was abandoned due to waterlogged pitch. The fixture was reversed due to no playable pitch available for US Vivo 04. The replayed game on 4 September 2024 was also abandoned due to heavy rain. The tie eventually completed on 7 September 2024.)	US Vivo 04 (9)

=== Third round ===
These matches were played on 14 and 15 September 2024.

Third Round Results: Méditerranée
Tie no	Home team (Tier)	Score	Away team (Tier)
1.	Olympique Barbentane (8)	0–2	Carnoux FC (6)
2.	FC Villeneuve (10)	1–4	USR Pertuis (7)
3.	JS Istréenne (10)	1–1 (8–7 p)	RC Provence (10)
4.	AS Piolenc (10)	0–4	Luynes Sports (6)
5.	FC Carpentras (11)	2–2 (5–4 p)	FC Sisteron (9)
6.	Stade Marseillais UC (6)	0–0 (4–2 p)	SC Cayolle (7)
7.	FC Saint-Rémy (10)	2–2 (2–4 p)	AS Martigues Sud (7)
8.	US Planaise (10)	1–5	Salon Bel Air (7)
9.	FC Châteauneuf La Mède (10)	0–4	Berre SC (7)
10.	Olympique Montelais (8)	2–4	ES Fosséenne (5)
11.	SC Allauch (9)	1–1 (2–3 p)	SC Montredon Bonneveine (7)
12.	Ventoux Sud FC (9)	0–3	Saint-Didier Espérance Pernoise (7)
13.	SC Gadagne (9)	0–2	EM Angloise (7)
14.	US Val d'Issole (11)	0–3	AS Camaretois (9)
15.	Boxeland Club Islois (11)	0–8	Sporting Courthézon Jonquières (7)
16.	ES La Ciotat (8)	1–2	AC Arlésien (6)
17.	Dentelles FC (11)	1–3	Réveil Grozeau Malaucène (10)
18.	AS Mazargues (9)	0–5	EUGA Ardziv (5)
19.	AS Forcalquier (9)	1–2	AS Gémenos (6)
20.	Olympique Eyraguais (10)	0–0 (4–5 p)	FA Châteaurenard (10)
21.	SC Vinonnais (8)	1–6	AS Vence (7)
22.	Burel FC (10)	1–4	ES Cannet Rocheville (5)
23.	FC Mougins Côte d'Azur (7)	1–4	AS Cagnes-Le Cros (6)
24.	US Veynes-Serres (10)	0–6	FC Rousset Sainte Victoire (5)
25.	AS Maximoise (6)	4–1	US Pegomas (7)
26.	Tremplin FC (7)	1–1 (3–5 p)	Six-Fours Le Brusc FC (6)
27.	RO Menton (9)	3–2	SC Draguignan (9)
28.	AS Valensole Gréoux (9)	2–4	AS Brignoles (8)
29.	FC Cimiez (11)	1–2	FC Ramatuelle (7)
30.	US Pradet (9)	0–3	EP Manosque (7)
31.	JS Berthe (9)	4–1	ES Lorguaise (10)
32.	FCUS Tropézienne (7)	0–0 (9–10 p)	AS Estérel (8)
33.	Montet Bornala Club de Nice (10)	0–5	US Mandelieu-La Napoule (6)
34.	AS Valleroise (10)	1–6	Gardia Club (8)
35.	CDJ Antibes (9)	2–2 (4–1 p)	US Moyenne Durance (7)
36.	AS Roquebrune-Cap-Martin (9)	1–3	US Marseille Endoume (7)
37.	AS Saint-Cyr (10)	1–2	US Carqueiranne-La Crau (7)
38.	US Valbonne Sophia Antipolis (9)	0–2	Villefranche Saint-Jean Beaulieu FC (5)
39.	SC Nansais (9)	1–1 (4–3 p)	Entente Saint-Sylvestre Nice Nord (7)

=== Fourth round ===
These matches were played on 28 and 29 September 2024.

Fourth Round Results: Méditerranée
Tie no	Home team (Tier)	Score	Away team (Tier)
1.	US Mandelieu-La Napoule (6)	0–0 (4–5 p)	ES Cannet Rocheville (5)
2.	Hyères FC (4)	2–2 (4–5 p)	FC Istres (4)
3.	AS Brignoles (8)	0–1	EUGA Ardziv (5)
4.	AS Cagnes-Le Cros (6)	3–1	AS Vence (7)
5.	US Carqueiranne-La Crau (7)	2–1	SC Toulon (4)
6.	AC Arlésien (6)	2–1	SC Montredon Bonneveine (7)
7.	EP Manosque (7)	1–1 (2–3 p)	ES Fosséenne (5)
8.	RO Menton (9)	1–3	ÉFC Fréjus Saint-Raphaël (4)
9.	JS Istréenne (10)	1–3	Luynes Sports (6)
10.	JS Berthe (9)	1–4	FC Rousset Sainte Victoire (5)
11.	Gardia Club (8)	4–0	AS Camaretois (9)
12.	CDJ Antibes (9)	1–4	AS Maximoise (6)
13.	EM Angloise (7)	0–3	AS Cannes (4)
14.	Réveil Grozeau Malaucène (10)	2–1	AS Gémenos (6)
15.	SC Nansais (9)	4–1	Salon Bel Air (7)
16.	Six-Fours Le Brusc FC (6)	1–1 (4–3 p)	RC Grasse (4)
17.	Sporting Courthézon Jonquières (7)	2–2 (3–1 p)	AS Martigues Sud (7)
18.	FA Châteaurenard (10)	0–4	AS Estérel (8)
19.	Saint-Didier Espérance Pernoise (7)	2–0	US Marseille Endoume (7)
20.	FC Carpentras (11)	0–2	Villefranche Saint-Jean Beaulieu FC (5)
21.	Stade Marseillais UC (6)	2–4	Marignane Gignac Côte Bleue FC (4)
22.	Berre SC (7)	3–1	USR Pertuis (7)
23.	Carnoux FC (6)	5–0	FC Ramatuelle (7)

=== Fifth round ===
These matches were played on 11, 12 and 13 October 2024.

Fifth Round Results: Méditerranée
Tie no	Home team (Tier)	Score	Away team (Tier)
1.	Berre SC (7)	3–1	AS Cagnes-Le Cros (6)
2.	Sporting Courthézon Jonquières (7)	0–1	Marignane Gignac Côte Bleue FC (4)
3.	AS Estérel (8)	0–0 (9–10 p)	EUGA Ardziv (5)
4.	SC Nansais (9)	0–4	AS Maximoise (6)
5.	Luynes Sports (6)	1–1 (2–4 p)	AC Arlésien (6)
6.	Saint-Didier Espérance Pernoise (7)	0–0 (4–1 p)	Aubagne FC (3)
7.	Réveil Grozeau Malaucène (10)	0–7	ES Cannet Rocheville (5)
8.	AS Cannes (4)	2–1	Villefranche Saint-Jean Beaulieu FC (5)
9.	FC Istres (4)	1–0	ÉFC Fréjus Saint-Raphaël (4)
10.	US Carqueiranne-La Crau (7)	1–1 (3–4 p)	FC Rousset Sainte Victoire (5)
11.	Gardia Club (8)	0–5	Carnoux FC (6)
12.	ES Fosséenne (5)	1–1 (2–4 p)	Six-Fours Le Brusc FC (6)

=== Sixth round ===
These matches were played on 26 and 27 October 2024, with two postponed to 2 and 3 November 2024.

Sixth Round Results: Méditerranée
Tie no	Home team (Tier)	Score	Away team (Tier)
1.	ES Cannet Rocheville (5)	5–1 (Note: Original match postponed due to a forecast of severe weather. Rearranged for the following weekend.)	AS Maximoise (6)
2.	Berre SC (7)	1–2	Marignane Gignac Côte Bleue FC (4)
3.	Six-Fours Le Brusc FC (6)	1–3	AS Cannes (4)
4.	FC Rousset Sainte Victoire (5)	2–3	FC Istres (4)
5.	Carnoux FC (6)	1–0	EUGA Ardziv (5)
6.	AC Arlésien (6)	0–0 (4–3 p)	Saint-Didier Espérance Pernoise (7)
