= 2025–26 Coupe de France preliminary rounds, Méditerranée =

The 2025–26 Coupe de France preliminary rounds, Méditerranée was the qualifying competition to decide which teams from the leagues of the Méditerranée region of France took part in the main competition from the seventh round.

A total of five teams qualified from the Méditerranée preliminary rounds, one less than the previous season.

In the 2024–25 AS Cannes of Championnat National 2 progressed furthest in the competition from the region, with a run to the semi-final stage during which they beat Ligue 2 opposition in Grenoble Foot 38, FC Lorient and En Avant Guingamp along the way. They were denied a place in the final, losing 2–1 to Stade de Reims from Ligue 1.

== Draws and fixtures ==
The first round draw was published on 24 July 2025, with 98 ties featuring all entering teams from the district leagues and the third tier of the regional league, and 16 teams drawn at random from the second tier of the regional league. The 58 ties of the second round draw, which saw the remaining regional league teams enter the competition, were published on 26 August 2025.

The third round draw was published on 4 September 2025, and saw the entry to the competition of the four regional teams from Championnat National 3. The fourth round draw, including the seven regional teams from Championnat National 2, took place on 18 September 2025. The ties for the fifth and sixth round were set in a single draw on 1 October 2025. The single Championnat National side from the region entered at the fifth round stage.

=== First round ===
These matches were played on 24 and 27 August 2025.

First Round Results: Méditerranée
Tie no	Home team (Tier)	Score	Away team (Tier)
1.	US Biot (11)	0–2	US Pegomas (8)
2.	Olympique Cabriès Calas (11)	2–8	FC Avignon (7)
3.	ÉS Boulbon (9)	2–1	FC Septèmes Consolat (7)
4.	AFC Sainte-Tulle-Pierrevert (9)	1–3 (Note: AC Arlésien penalised for fielding too many transferred players, AFC Sainte-Tulle-Pierrevert qualified.)	AC Arlésien (7)
5.	FC Mollégès Eygalières (10)	2–4	FC Saint-Étienne-du-Grès (11)
6.	JS Istréenne (11)	3–2	US Avignonnaise (10)
7.	ACS Morières (11)	2–1	Travaillan FC (11)
8.	JS Visannaise (12)	0–6	Dentelles FC (11)
9.	AS Valayannaise (11)	2–3	Olympique Montelais (9)
10.	FC Saint-Victoret (10)	0–4	FC Ramatuelle (7)
11.	SO Mornas (11)	4–3	SO Velleronnais (10)
12.	Monaco United	0–3 (Note: Tie won by means of forfeit.)	ÉS Contoise (11)
13.	Gazélec Sports Nice (11)	1–4	US Cannes Bocca Olympique (10)
14.	US Touraine (11)	0–15	AS Martigues Sud (7)
15.	FC Antibes (9)	3–5	Entente Saint-Sylvestre Nice Nord (8)
16.	FC Pays du Fayence (11)	2–4	AS Mar Vivo (10)
17.	SO Roquettan (11)	1–1 (5–3 p)	SC Mouans-Sartoux (7)
18.	Stade Laurentin (13)	2–2 (3–4 p)	US Cap d'Ail (9)
19.	FC Saint-Cézaire (13)	0–5	FC Cannes Ranguin (11)
20.	AO Tourrette-Levens (13)	0–11	FC Carros (9)
21.	AS Traminots Alpes Maritimes (12)	5–3	Tourrettes-sur-Loup Football (12)
22.	FC Fournas Vallauris (13)	0–11	US Valbonne Sophia Antipolis (10)
23.	FC Grimaud (11)	1–6	US Val d'Issole (10)
24.	JS Berthe (9)	3–0	AS Maximoise (7)
25.	CA Cannetois (11)	0–6	US Cuers-Pierrefeu (8)
26.	SC Barjols (11)	0–6	SO Londais (8)
27.	SC Tourvain (10)	3–1	FC Revestois (11)
28.	Gapeau FC (9)	6–1	RC La Baie (10)
29.	Entente Pivotte Serinette (11)	0–7	ASPTT Hyères (11)
30.	US Autre Provence (9)	1–0	SC Gadagne (9)
31.	US Velauxienne (11)	2–3	FC Vignères (11)
32.	FC Lançonnais (10)	4–2	Entente Fontvieille-Raphèle-Moulès (11)
33.	ES Bassin Minier (11)	2–5	US 1er Canton Marseille (10)
34.	US Saint-Saturnin-lès-Avignon (11)	0–3	Salon Bel Air (8)
35.	FC Cheval Blanc (11)	1–1 (6–5 p)	SC Luberon (11)
36.	SC Montfavet (9)	5–2	FC Châteauneuf La Mède (10)
37.	US Luberon Monts de Vaucluse (10)	1–3	ARC Cavaillon (9)
38.	FO Ventabren (10)	1–5	Olympique Barbentane (8)
39.	Olympique Novais (11)	4–2	Réveil Grozeau Malaucène (10)
40.	Olympique Eyraguais (10)	3–0	US Miramas (11)
41.	Stade Maillanais (11)	4–1	AS Coudoux (11)
42.	SC Mondragon (10)	6–3	AS Rasteau (11)
43.	AS Rognac (10)	1–0	FC Saint-Rémy (10)
44.	Boxeland Club Islois (10)	1–1 (1–3 p)	FC Carpentras (10)
45.	AAS Val Saint-André (9)	1–1 (6–7 p)	JS Pennes Mirabeau (10)
46.	CS Sarrians (11)	2–7	EM Angloise (8)
47.	RC Provence (11)	0–3	FC Villeneuve (9)
48.	US Caderousse (10)	1–1 (4–5 p)	AS Camaretois (9)
49.	FC Saint-Mitre-les-Remparts (10)	2–1	Marseille United (11)
50.	FC Lavandou Bormes (10)	2–3	FC Pugetois (9)
51.	ÉS Lorguaise (10)	6–0	FC Vidauban (11)
52.	Barcelonnette FC (10)	1–2	FC Céreste-Reillanne (9)
53.	US Saint-Mandrier (10)	0–3	AS Brignoles (8)
54.	SC Cogolin (10)	4–1	FC Belgentier (11)
55.	RFC Toulon (U20) (Note: RFC Toulon fielded their Under-20 team in the competition, due to not having a senior team.)	2–1	Stade Transian (11)
56.	AS Presqu'île de Giens (12)	0–4	US La Cadière (10)
57.	SC Frais Vallon (9)	4–1	Grand Saint Barthelemy Omnisports (10)
58.	SC Allauch (9)	3–0	ÉS Milloise (8)
59.	AC Toulonnais (11)	2–2 (2–4 p)	UA Valettoise (7)
60.	Olympique Antibes Juan-les-Pins (8)	1–1 (6–5 p)	AS Vence (8)
61.	SO Septèmes (10)	1–3	SC Draguignan (9)
62.	SC Nansais (9)	1–2	US Ollioulaise (9)
63.	Burel FC (10)	1–1 (10–9 p)	ASPTT Toulon Hospitalier (9)
64.	US Sanary (11)	2–5	AS Marseillaise Saint-Loup 10ème (10)
65.	JO Saint-Gabriel (11)	3–5	ES La Ciotat (8)
66.	ES Cuges (10)	8–1	JS Saint-Julien (none)
67.	ÉS Saint-André (11)	5–3	AS Valleroise (10)
68.	CA Plan-de-Cuques (10)	1–0	USPEG Marseille (none)
69.	RO Menton (9)	1–0	AS Roquebrune-Cap-Martin (10)
70.	FC Golfe-Juan (12)	2–2 (4–5 p)	Drap Football (11)
71.	US Michelis (11)	3–0	Gardia Club (none)
72.	Étoile de Menton (10)	1–1 (8–7 p)	FC Roquefort-la-Bédoule (11)
73.	AS Forcalquier (9)	2–4	FA Val Durance (8)
74.	AS Levensois (13)	0–4	FC Cimiez (11)
75.	EJGC Graveson (9)	1–0	US Planaise (10)
76.	US Vivo 04 (9)	3–2	US Veynes-Serres (9)
77.	Avenir Simiane Bouc-Bel-Air (9)	3–4	JSA Saint-Antoine (11)
78.	SC Kartala (10)	4–1	US Bandol (12)
79.	Marseille Sud Olympique (10)	5–1	US Puyricard (11)
80.	Étoile Huveaune (9)	0–3	SC Montredon Bonneveine (7)
81.	US Venelles (9)	1–5	US Marseille Endoume (7)
82.	AS Saint-Cyr (9)	0–4	AS Esterel (7)
83.	AS Mazargues (9)	1–2	AS Aix-en-Provence (8)
84.	US Barthelasse (12)	1–1 (3–4 p)	FC Aureille (10)
85.	AS Roquefort (9)	3–0	US Tramways Marseille (11)
86.	US Farenque (10)	10–0	FC Fuveau Provence (11)
87.	JS Beaussetanne (11)	1–3	Olympique Saint-Maximinois (7)
88.	Stade Cabannais (12)	1–5	SC Saint-Martinois (9)
89.	AS Dauphin (10)	3–5	US Moyenne Durance (8)
90.	US Châteauneuf Aubignosc Peipin (10)	1–1 (3–1 p)	SC Vinonnais (8)
91.	CA Digne 04 (8)	3–2	AF Champsaur Valgaudemar (9)
92.	FC Malijai (11)	0–10	EP Manosque (7)
93.	Laragne Sports (9)	1–2	FC Sisteron (9)
94.	Peille FC (12)	3–9	FC Euro African (10)
95.	SC Rognonais (11)	0–9	Saint-Didier Espérance Pernoise (7)
96.	FC Gonfaron (11)	0–3	FCUS Tropézienne (7)
97.	FC Seynois (9)	2–2 (5–3 p) (Note: FC Seynoise penalised for a technical infringement, Stade Marseillais UC qualified.)	Stade Marseillais UC (7)
98.	Avance FC (11)	0–10	Gap Foot 05 (8)

=== Second round ===
These matches were played on 30 and 31 August 2025.

Second Round Results: Méditerranée
Tie no	Home team (Tier)	Score	Away team (Tier)
1.	AS Brignoles (8)	3–0	US Cuers-Pierrefeu (8)
2.	US Michelis (11)	0–1	US Ollioulaise (9)
3.	JS Pennes Mirabeau (10)	4–1	SC Frais Vallon (9)
4.	AS Mar Vivo (10)	1–4	Burel FC (10)
5.	US 1er Canton Marseille (10)	1–3	AS Gémenos (6)
6.	JSA Saint-Antoine (11)	0–6	Six-Fours Le Brusc FC (6)
7.	AS Marseillaise Saint-Loup 10ème (10)	1–5	ES Cuges (10)
8.	Marseille Sud Olympique (10)	1–0	CA Plan-de-Cuques (10)
9.	US Val d'Issole (10)	0–6	EUGA Ardziv (6)
10.	US La Cadière (10)	3–2	SC Tourvain (10)
11.	US Châteauneuf Aubignosc Peipin (10)	0–2	JS Istréenne (11)
12.	FC Céreste-Reillanne (9)	3–4	EP Manosque (7)
13.	FC Sisteron (9)	2–2 (5–4 p)	US Vivo 04 (9)
14.	AS Traminots Alpes Maritimes (12)	8–4	Étoile de Menton (10)
15.	FC Pugetois (9)	0–3	FC Mougins Côte d'Azur (7)
16.	SC Cogolin (10)	0–4	AS Cagnes-Le Cros (6)
17.	SO Roquettan (11)	0–2	AS Roquefort (9)
18.	SO Londais (8)	2–4	AS Esterel (7)
19.	SC Draguignan (9)	2–1	FC Carros (9)
20.	RO Menton (9)	0–1	FCUS Tropézienne (7)
21.	FC Ramatuelle (7)	1–2	US Carqueiranne-La Crau (6)
22.	FC Cimiez (11)	0–6	Tremplin FC (7)
23.	FC Euro African (10)	0–8	UA Valettoise (7)
24.	ÉS Contoise (11)	1–3	US Pegomas (8)
25.	ÉS Lorguaise (10)	3–4	Entente Saint-Sylvestre Nice Nord (8)
26.	US Valbonne Sophia Antipolis (10)	4–0	FC Cannes Ranguin (11)
27.	ÉS Saint-André (11)	1–5	US Cap d'Ail (9)
28.	US Cannes Bocca Olympique (10)	1–3	Drap Football (11)
29.	ASPTT Hyères (11)	2–6	US Mandelieu-La Napoule (6)
30.	Gapeau FC (9)	2–1	FC Beausoleil (6)
31.	Olympique Antibes Juan-les-Pins (8)	0–0 (4–1 p)	AS Fontonne Antibes (7)
32.	SO Mornas (11)	1–0	Olympique Montelais (9)
33.	FC Carpentras (10)	2–2 (4–5 p)	US Autre Provence (9)
34.	Saint-Didier Espérance Pernoise (7)	4–0	Sporting Courthézon Jonquières (7)
35.	AS Camaretois (9)	6–2	SC Mondragon (10)
36.	Dentelles FC (11)	1–6	Gap Foot 05 (8)
37.	FC Aureille (10)	0–2	US Marseille Endoume (7)
38.	FC Saint-Étienne-du-Grès (11)	1–12	EM Angloise (8)
39.	FC Lançonnais (10)	5–1	ACS Morières (11)
40.	Marignane Gignac Côte Bleue FC (6)	2–2 (3–5 p)	USR Pertuis (7)
41.	Olympique Eyraguais (10)	4–4 (2–4 p)	ÉS Boulbon (9)
42.	SC Saint-Martinois (9)	1–8	AS Martigues Sud (7)
43.	FC Cheval Blanc (11)	1–3	FC Villeneuve (9)
44.	CA Digne 04 (8)	0–3	Luynes Sports (6)
45.	FA Val Durance (8)	3–1	SC Allauch (9)
46.	FC Saint-Mitre-les-Remparts (10)	2–4	ES La Ciotat (8)
47.	FC Avignon (7)	0–0 (5–3 p)	Berre SC (6)
48.	Stade Maillanais (11)	0–1	EJGC Graveson (9)
49.	US Farenque (10)	9–1	Olympique Novais (11)
50.	ARC Cavaillon (9)	0–3	AC Le Pontet-Vedène (6)
51.	US Moyenne Durance (8)	3–2	Olympique Barbentane (8)
52.	AS Rognac (10)	2–5	SC Montfavet (9)
53.	FC Martigues (11)	0–3 (Note: Tie won by means of forfeit.)	Salon Bel Air (8)
54.	JS Berthe (9)	– (Note: Match abandonded with the scoreline 4–2. JS Berthe qualified.)	SC Kartala (10)
55.	AS Aix-en-Provence (8)	0–0 (0–2 p)	SC Cayolle (7)
56.	FC Vignères (11)	0–0 (3–5 p)	AFC Sainte-Tulle-Pierrevert (9)
57.	RFC Toulon (U20)	0–1	Stade Marseillais UC (7)
58.	SC Montredon Bonneveine (7)	3–1	Olympique Saint-Maximinois (7)

=== Third round ===
These matches were played on 13 and 14 September 2025.

Third Round Results: Méditerranée
Tie no	Home team (Tier)	Score	Away team (Tier)
1.	EJGC Graveson (9)	0–1	AS Gémenos (6)
2.	AS Camaretois (9)	1–3	Luynes Sports (6)
3.	Salon Bel Air (8)	2–1	Saint-Didier Espérance Pernoise (7)
4.	Stade Marseillais UC (7)	2–1	Gap Foot 05 (8)
5.	SO Mornas (11)	2–3	US Moyenne Durance (8)
6.	SC Montredon Bonneveine (7)	1–4	ES Fosséenne (5)
7.	FC Villeneuve (9)	4–2	Marseille Sud Olympique (10)
8.	US Autre Provence (9)	2–0	FC Sisteron (9)
9.	Burel FC (10)	0–3	US Marseille Endoume (7)
10.	ÉS Boulbon (9)	0–1	US Farenque (10)
11.	JS Istréenne (11)	1–7	USR Pertuis (7)
12.	FC Avignon (7)	2–1	FA Val Durance (8)
13.	EM Angloise (8)	3–0	SC Cayolle (7)
14.	FC Lançonnais (10)	2–2 (3–4 p) (Note: JS Pennes Mirabeau penalised for a technical infringement, FC Lançonnais qualified.)	JS Pennes Mirabeau (10)
15.	AS Martigues Sud (7)	1–1 (5–4 p)	EUGA Ardziv (6)
16.	US Ollioulaise (9)	0–7	AC Le Pontet-Vedène (6)
17.	SC Montfavet (9)	2–5	Carnoux FC (5)
18.	US Pegomas (8)	0–3	Six-Fours Le Brusc FC (6)
19.	ES La Ciotat (8)	1–2	ES Cannet Rocheville (5)
20.	US Cap d'Ail (9)	7–0	AFC Sainte-Tulle-Pierrevert (9)
21.	SC Draguignan (9)	1–0	FC Mougins Côte d'Azur (7)
22.	US Valbonne Sophia Antipolis (10)	4–1	US La Cadière (10)
23.	UA Valettoise (7)	4–0	EP Manosque (7)
24.	AS Traminots Alpes Maritimes (12)	– (Note: Match abandoned, with the scoreline 0–1, for safety reasons. Olympique Antibes Juan-les-Pins qualified.)	Olympique Antibes Juan-les-Pins (8)
25.	Tremplin FC (7)	1–0	Riviera FC (5)
26.	ES Cuges (10)	1–5	US Carqueiranne-La Crau (6)
27.	JS Berthe (9)	0–4	FCUS Tropézienne (7)
28.	AS Roquefort (9)	0–4	AS Cagnes-Le Cros (6)
29.	Drap Football (11)	1–8	AS Esterel (7)
30.	Entente Saint-Sylvestre Nice Nord (8)	3–0	Gapeau FC (9)
31.	AS Brignoles (8)	0–0 (5–3 p)	US Mandelieu-La Napoule (6)

=== Fourth round ===
These matches were played on 26, 27 and 28 September 2025.

Fourth Round Results: Méditerranée
Tie no	Home team (Tier)	Score	Away team (Tier)
1.	US Cap d'Ail (9)	2–2 (3–1 p)	FCUS Tropézienne (7)
2.	SC Draguignan (9)	1–1 (3–2 p)	US Carqueiranne-La Crau (6)
3.	FC Villeneuve (9)	0–4	FC Avignon (7)
4.	RC Pays de Grasse (4)	2–2 (3–2 p)	SC Toulon (4)
5.	USR Pertuis (7)	3–1	Luynes Sports (6)
6.	AS Martigues Sud (7)	3–0	Entente Saint-Sylvestre Nice Nord (8)
7.	US Marseille Endoume (7)	1–1 (2–4 p)	AC Le Pontet-Vedène (6)
8.	US Farenque (10)	0–4	Hyères FC (4)
9.	ES Fosséenne (5)	5–0	AS Cagnes-Le Cros (6)
10.	US Autre Provence (9)	1–1 (3–4 p)	UA Valettoise (7)
11.	US Moyenne Durance (8)	2–1	Tremplin FC (7)
12.	Olympique Antibes Juan-les-Pins (8)	0–3	ÉFC Fréjus Saint-Raphaël (4)
13.	FC Lançonnais (10)	1–2	US Valbonne Sophia Antipolis (10)
14.	AS Brignoles (8)	1–1 (1–4 p)	AS Gémenos (6)
15.	Six-Fours Le Brusc FC (6)	1–1 (3–4 p)	Stade Marseillais UC (7)
16.	EM Angloise (8)	3–0	Salon Bel Air (8)
17.	Carnoux FC (5)	0–0 (5–3 p)	ES Cannet Rocheville (5)
18.	AS Cannes (4)	5–1	FC Rousset Sainte Victoire (4)
19.	AS Esterel (7)	2–2 (8–9 p)	Istres FC (4)

=== Fifth round ===
These matches were played on 11 and 12 October 2025.

Fifth Round Results: Méditerranée
Tie no	Home team (Tier)	Score	Away team (Tier)
1.	AS Martigues Sud (7)	0–0 (1–3 p)	RC Pays de Grasse (4)
2.	EM Angloise (8)	1–3	USR Pertuis (7)
3.	US Valbonne Sophia Antipolis (10)	3–6	Carnoux FC (5)
4.	AS Gémenos (6)	2–4	ÉFC Fréjus Saint-Raphaël (4)
5.	Hyères FC (4)	0–1	Istres FC (4)
6.	AC Le Pontet-Vedène (6)	2–2 (1–3 p)	ES Fosséenne (5)
7.	US Moyenne Durance (8)	1–4	SC Aubagne Air Bel (3)
8.	US Cap d'Ail (9)	0–5	AS Cannes (4)
9.	SC Draguignan (9)	2–3	FC Avignon (7)
10.	UA Valettoise (7)	1–1 (5–3 p)	Stade Marseillais UC (7)

=== Sixth round ===
These matches were played on 25 and 26 October 2025, with one replayed on 12 November 2025.

Sixth Round Results: Méditerranée
Tie no	Home team (Tier)	Score	Away team (Tier)
1.	UA Valettoise (7)	1–1 (2–3 p)	Istres FC (4)
2.	SC Aubagne Air Bel (3)	3–0 (Note: The original match on 26 October 2025, which had been reversed from the original draw due to safety concerns, was abandoned late in the game, with the score 3–1, after clashes in the stands which required police attendance to break up. The league ordered the game be replayed at a neutral venue, and this took place on 12 November 2025.)	FC Avignon (7)
3.	RC Pays de Grasse (4)	3–1	ES Fosséenne (5)
4.	USR Pertuis (7)	0–3	AS Cannes (4)
5.	Carnoux FC (5)	3–2	ÉFC Fréjus Saint-Raphaël (4)
