= 2023–24 Coupe de France preliminary rounds, Méditerranée =

The 2023–24 Coupe de France preliminary rounds, Méditerranée is the qualifying competition to decide which teams from the leagues of the Méditerranée region of France take part in the main competition from the seventh round.

A total of five teams will qualify from the Méditerranée section of the 2023–24 Coupe de France preliminary rounds.

In 2022–23, RC Grasse progressed furthest in the competition, reaching the round of 32, before losing on penalties to Ligue 2 Rodez after a goal-less match.

== Draws and fixtures ==
The first round draw was published, initially via the league's Facebook site, on 2 August 2023. All teams from district level leagues and Régional 2 entered at this stage, with a total of 194 teams drawn. The second round draw, including the 11 teams from Régional 1, was made on 30 August 2023.

The third round draw, including 6 teams from Championnat National 3, was published on 6 September 2023. The fourth round draw, including 6 teams from Championnat National 2, was published on 19 September 2023. The fifth round, including the two teams from Championnat National wa published on 3 October 2023. The sixth and final regional round was drawn on 17 October 2023.

=== First round ===
These matches were played on 26 and 27 August 2023, with two postponed until 30 August 2023.

First Round Results: Méditerranée
Tie no	Home team (Tier)	Score	Away team (Tier)
1.	Avenir Simiane Bouc-Bel-Air (9)	2–1	SA Saint-Antoine (8)
2.	FA Val Durance (7)	2–0	SC Montfavet (8)
3.	Gardia Club (7)	1–0	US Pradet (8)
4.	AS Valensole Gréoux (8)	2–2 (4–3 p)	Argentière Sport Les Écrins (9)
5.	SC Vinonnais (8)	1–1 (9–10 p)	Gap Foot 05 (7)
6.	FC Sisteron (8)	4–0	FC Céreste-Reillanne (8)
7.	Barcelonnette FC (9)	0–3	US Châteauneuf Aubignosc Peipin (9)
8.	US Vivo 04 (8)	3–1	US Veynes-Serres (9)
9.	EP Manosque (7)	0–2	AS Martigues Sud (7)
10.	Réveil Grozeau Malaucène (10)	1–0	FC Aureille (10)
11.	Sporting Courthézon Jonquières (7)	1–1 (4–3 p)	Espérance Pernoise (7)
12.	FC Mollégès Eygalières (9)	3–1	SO Velleronnais (10)
13.	Ventoux Sud FC (9)	1–0	US Planaise (9)
14.	FC Villeneuve (9)	1–1 (3–4 p)	Étoile d'Aubune (10)
15.	Olympique Montelais (8)	0–1	USR Pertuis (8)
16.	Olympique Novais (9)	1–2	SC Mondragon (10)
17.	ACS Morières (9)	3–0 (Note: Tie won by means of forfeit.)	AS Rasteau (10)
18.	US Autre Provence (8)	1–4	FA Châteaurenard (9)
19.	EM Angloise (7)	3–2	Stade Maillanais (8)
20.	FC Saint-Rémy (10)	7–0	FC Saint-Étienne-du-Grès (11)
21.	US Grès Orange Sud (10)	7–0	Entente Saint-Jean-du-Grès (11)
22.	FC Nyons (11)	1–10	FC Cheval Blanc (10)
23.	Olympique Barbentane (7)	3–0 (Note: Olympique Barbentane penalised for fielding an ineligible player, AS Camaretois qualify.)	AS Camaretois (8)
24.	SC Gadagne (8)	0–3	Caumont FC (7)
25.	Espérance Gordienne (9)	3–0	EJGC Graveson (10)
26.	Avenir Goult Roussillon (9)	2–2 (4–3 p)	Maison Jenuesse et Club du Vaucluse (9)
27.	CS Sarrians (11)	1–3	US Lapalud (10)
28.	US Thoroise (10)	4–1	Dentelles FC (9)
29.	Calavon FC (10)	2–0	OM Luberon (10)
30.	Boxeland Club Islois (10)	5–3	Tarascon SC (10)
31.	Olympique Eyraguais (9)	3–1	Travaillan FC (10)
32.	FC Vignères (11)	0–2	FC Avignon Ouest (10)
33.	RCB Bollène (9)	1–0	US Avignonnaise (8)
34.	US Cannes Bocca Olympique (8)	1–3	FC Beausoleil (7)
35.	FC Antibes (9)	4–3	FC Carros (10)
36.	CA Peymeinade (9)	4–1	ES des Baous (9)
37.	CAS Eaux Nice (10)	7–1	AS Traminots Alpes Maritimes (11)
38.	FC Cimiez (10)	3–6	FC Euro African (9)
39.	Peille FC (11)	0–0 (7–8 p)	AS Saint-Martin-du-Var (11)
40.	ÉS Saint-André (10)	4–2	AS Roquefort (9)
41.	OC Blausasc (11)	0–0 (7–6 p) (Note: OC Blausasc penalised, AS Valleroise qualify.)	AS Valleroise (10)
42.	US Biot (9)	2–3	SC Mouans-Sartoux (8)
43.	Olympique Suquetan Cannes Croisette (11)	0–1	SO Roquettan (10)
44.	AS Roquebrune-Cap-Martin (8)	2–2 (5–3 p)	FC Mougins Côte d'Azur (7)
45.	US Cap d'Ail (8)	2–2 (3–4 p)	US Valbonne (8)
46.	Stade Laurentin (8)	3–1	CDJ Antibes (8)
47.	RO Menton (8)	2–0	US Pegomas (7)
48.	AS Fontonne Antibes (7)	0–0 (5–3 p)	Entente Saint-Sylvestre Nice Nord (7)
49.	ASPTT Nice (10)	0–3	Étoile de Menton (10)
50.	FC Belgentier (10)	3–0	FC Revestois (10)
51.	US Saint-Mandrier (8)	4–2	SC Draguignan (8)
52.	CA Cannetois (9)	1–0	SC Cogolin (8)
53.	SC Nansais (9)	4–1	SC Plantourian (10)
54.	FC Pays du Fayence (9)	3–0	FC Grimaud (10)
55.	FCUS Tropézienne (8)	0–0 (3–4 p)	AS Estérel (8)
56.	US Sanary (9)	8–1	SC Rougierois (10)
57.	RC La Baie (9)	3–0	Entente ASPTT Hospitaliers Toulon (8)
58.	FC Vidauban (9)	0–4	AS Brignoles (8)
59.	US La Cadière (9)	2–0	ASPTT Hyères (10)
60.	FC Carnoules (11)	1–3	SC Tourvain (11)
61.	SO Londais (7)	2–4	Tremplin FC (8)
62.	UA Valettoise (7)	2–1 (Note: UA Valettoise penalised for fielding a suspended player, FC Ramatuelle qualify.)	FC Ramatuelle (7)
63.	FC Lavandou Bormes (9)	0–0 (3–5 p)	JS Beaussetanne (9)
64.	FA Fréjusienne (10)	1–0	AS Presqu'île de Giens (11)
65.	Olympique Saint-Maximinois (7)	3–1	Gapeau FC (8)
66.	AS Mar Vivo (9)	1–0	AS Arcoise (9)
67.	AS Saint-Cyr (9)	3–0	ES Lorguaise (10)
68.	Entente Pivotte Serinette (10)	3–2	AS Montauroux (10)
69.	FC Seynois (9)	1–2	JS Berthe (9)
70.	US Mandelieu-La Napoule (7)	2–1	US Cuers-Pierrefeu (7)
71.	CA Roquebrunois (9)	3–2	JS Mourillonnaise (10)
72.	JS Istréenne (10)	4–1	US Velauxienne (10)
73.	USPEG Marseille (9)	7–0	AS Sainte-Marguerite (10)
74.	AS Aix-en-Provence (8)	0–0 (6–5 p)	SC Cayolle (8)
75.	AAS Val Saint-André (9)	4–1	Phocea Club Marseille (10)
76.	Sporting Pont de Crau (10)	1–6	Étoile Huveaune (10)
77.	Burel FC (9)	8–2	AS Coudoux (10)
78.	ES Bassin Minier (10)	0–5	USM Meyreuil (10)
79.	FC Châteauneuf La Mède (9)	3–3 (5–4 p)	JS Pennes Mirabeau (9)
80.	ES Cuges (10)	3–1	JSA Saint-Antoine (10)
81.	US Pélican (10)	0–4	US Miramas (9)
82.	FC Fuveau Provence (10)	2–2 (3–2 p)	AS Peyrollaise (10)
83.	AS Rognac (9)	2–1	CA Plan-de-Cuques (9)
84.	ES Pennoise (8)	2–1	US Farenque (9)
85.	US 1er Canton Marseille (9)	1–2	FC Septèmes (8)
86.	SC Kartala (10)	2–1	SO Septèmes (10)
87.	FC Saint-Mitre-les-Remparts (10)	3–0	SS Saint-Chamas (10)
88.	US Saint-Barthélemy Marseillais (10)	2–1	Grand Saint Barthelemy Omnisports (9)
89.	US Marseille Endoume (7)	0–1	Berre SC (7)
90.	Salon Bel Air (7)	2–2 (3–5 p)	ES Milloise (7)
91.	Gardanne Biver FC (8)	2–1	AS Mazargues (8)
92.	SC Saint-Martinois (9)	1–1 (3–4 p)	ÉS Port-Saint-Louis-du-Rhône (10)
93.	FO Ventabren (10)	1–2	FC Saint-Victoret (10)
94.	US Venelles (8)	1–1 (1–3 p)	SC Montredon Bonneveine (7)
95.	ES La Ciotat (7)	2–2 (4–3 p)	US Carqueiranne-La Crau (7)
96.	US Caderousse (10)	0–0 (6–5 p)	ARC Cavaillon (9)
97.	SC Allauch (9)	3–0	AS Marseillaise Saint-Loup 10ème (10)

=== Second round ===
These matches were played on 3 September 2023, with one postponed until 13 September 2023.

Second Round Results: Méditerranée
Tie no	Home team (Tier)	Score	Away team (Tier)
1.	US Châteauneuf Aubignosc Peipin (9)	1–3	FC Sisteron (8)
2.	AS Valensole Gréoux (8)	0–2	US Vivo 04 (8)
3.	Gap Foot 05 (7)	0–1	AS Aix-en-Provence (8)
4.	SC Mondragon (10)	1–1 (4–3 p)	Réveil Grozeau Malaucène (10)
5.	Étoile d'Aubune (10)	1–1 (6–5 p)	FC Mollégès Eygalières (9)
6.	USR Pertuis (8)	0–0 (4–5 p)	AC Le Pontet-Vedène (6)
7.	FA Châteaurenard (9)	4–2	ACS Morières (9)
8.	EM Angloise (7)	2–1	Sporting Courthézon Jonquières (7)
9.	FC Saint-Rémy (10)	2–0	US Caderousse (10)
10.	FC Cheval Blanc (10)	5–3	Espérance Gordienne (9)
11.	US Lapalud (10)	2–5	Avenir Goult Roussillon (9)
12.	FC Avignon Ouest (10)	5–0	US Thoroise (10)
13.	US Grès Orange Sud (10)	2–1	Boxeland Club Islois (10)
14.	Olympique Eyraguais (9)	4–0	Calavon FC (10)
15.	Ventoux Sud FC (9)	1–3	RCB Bollène (9)
16.	Caumont FC (7)	7–0	AS Camaretois (8)
17.	FA Val Durance (7)	1–0	AC Arlésien (6)
18.	FC Euro African (9)	3–3 (5–4 p)	Villefranche Saint-Jean Beaulieu FC (6)
19.	AS Saint-Martin-du-Var (11)	3–3 (5–3 p)	SO Roquettan (10)
20.	ÉS Saint-André (10)	0–5	SC Mouans-Sartoux (8)
21.	Étoile de Menton (10)	3–5	AS Valleroise (10)
22.	US Valbonne (8)	4–1	CA Peymeinade (9)
23.	AS Maximoise (6)	3–0	AS Fontonne Antibes (7)
24.	FC Antibes (9)	2–3	AS Vence (6)
25.	FC Belgentier (10)	0–1	Olympique Saint-Maximinois (7)
26.	SC Tourvain (11)	1–2	CA Cannetois (9)
27.	JS Beaussetanne (9)	3–3 (4–2 p)	SC Nansais (9)
28.	AS Estérel (8)	3–0	FC Pays du Fayence (9)
29.	Entente Pivotte Serinette (10)	0–5	Gardia Club (7)
30.	AS Brignoles (8)	5–0	US Sanary (9)
31.	AS Mar Vivo (9)	2–1	RC La Baie (9)
32.	CA Roquebrunois (9)	1–4	US La Cadière (9)
33.	JS Berthe (9)	1–3	ES Saint-Zacharie (6)
34.	AS Saint-Cyr (9)	2–3	FA Fréjusienne (10)
35.	Tremplin FC (8)	2–1	FC Ramatuelle (7)
36.	Stade Laurentin (8)	0–3 (Note: Tie won by means of forfeit.)	US Mandelieu-La Napoule (7)
37.	US Saint-Mandrier (8)	1–4	Six-Fours Le Brusc FC (6)
38.	US Miramas (9)	2–3	JS Istréenne (10)
39.	ÉS Port-Saint-Louis-du-Rhône (10)	1–1 (5–4 p)	USPEG Marseille (9)
40.	Étoile Huveaune (10)	0–0 (4–5 p)	SC Allauch (9)
41.	Burel FC (9)	2–2 (5–3 p)	AAS Val Saint-André (9)
42.	FC Saint-Victoret (10)	0–9	Luynes Sports (6)
43.	FC Châteauneuf La Mède (9)	4–3	FC Saint-Mitre-les-Remparts (10)
44.	ES Cuges (10)	3–0	FC Fuveau Provence (10)
45.	ES Pennoise (8)	2–3	Carnoux FC (6)
46.	AS Rognac (9)	2–3	ES La Ciotat (7)
47.	ES Milloise (7)	4–1	FC Septèmes (8)
48.	SC Montredon Bonneveine (7)	3–0	Berre SC (7)
49.	SC Kartala (10)	1–5	AS Martigues Sud (7)
50.	US Saint-Barthélemy Marseillais (10)	0–3	Stade Marseillais UC (6)
51.	Avenir Simiane Bouc-Bel-Air (9)	2–4	AS Gémenos (6)
52.	USM Meyreuil (10)	0–3	Gardanne Biver FC (8)
53.	FC Beausoleil (7)	3–0	RO Menton (8)
54.	CAS Eaux Nice (10)	1–2	AS Roquebrune-Cap-Martin (8)

=== Third round ===
These matches were played on 16 and 17 September 2023.

Third Round Results: Méditerranée
Tie no	Home team (Tier)	Score	Away team (Tier)
1.	FA Val Durance (7)	1–2	EUGA Ardziv (5)
2.	AS Aix-en-Provence (8)	1–1 (4–2 p)	AS Gémenos (6)
3.	AS Martigues Sud (7)	1–3	AS Brignoles (8)
4.	Gardanne Biver FC (8)	0–2	ES Fosséenne (5)
5.	FC Saint-Rémy (10)	1–1 (4–3 p)	Caumont FC (7)
6.	Carnoux FC (6)	1–1 (5–6 p)	EM Angloise (7)
7.	RCB Bollène (9)	5–0	Étoile d'Aubune (10)
8.	Olympique Eyraguais (9)	1–0	US Grès Orange Sud (10)
9.	FC Avignon Ouest (10)	3–3 (4–2 p)	FC Châteauneuf La Mède (9)
10.	SC Mondragon (10)	0–5	FC Istres (5)
11.	FC Cheval Blanc (10)	0–4	Luynes Sports (6)
12.	Avenir Goult Roussillon (9)	3–1	FA Châteaurenard (9)
13.	FC Sisteron (8)	0–6	AC Le Pontet-Vedène (6)
14.	ÉS Port-Saint-Louis-du-Rhône (10)	0–5	SC Montredon Bonneveine (7)
15.	US Vivo 04 (8)	1–5	Stade Marseillais UC (6)
16.	AS Saint-Martin-du-Var (11)	0–3	Olympique Saint-Maximinois (7)
17.	AS Valleroise (10)	1–1 (2–4 p)	FC Beausoleil (7)
18.	AS Estérel (8)	1–4	FC Rousset Sainte Victoire (5)
19.	JS Istréenne (10)	0–8	AS Cagnes-Le Cros (5)
20.	AS Roquebrune-Cap-Martin (8)	0–2	AS Vence (6)
21.	US La Cadière (9)	4–1	Burel FC (9)
22.	Gardia Club (7)	3–1	US Valbonne (8)
23.	AS Mar Vivo (9)	0–3	ES Saint-Zacharie (6)
24.	Tremplin FC (8)	1–1 (3–1 p)	Six-Fours Le Brusc FC (6)
25.	US Mandelieu-La Napoule (7)	2–0	ES Cannet Rocheville (5)
26.	SC Allauch (9)	0–4	AS Maximoise (6)
27.	ES Cuges (10)	0–5	ES La Ciotat (7)
28.	CA Cannetois (9)	1–5	ES Milloise (7)
29.	FA Fréjusienne (10)	2–3	JS Beaussetanne (9)
30.	SC Mouans-Sartoux (8)	2–1	FC Euro African (9)

=== Fourth round ===
These matches were played on 30 September and 1 October 2023.

Fourth Round Results: Méditerranée
Tie no	Home team (Tier)	Score	Away team (Tier)
1.	Olympique Eyraguais (9)	1–4	US Mandelieu-La Napoule (7)
2.	JS Beaussetanne (9)	1–5	Hyères FC (4)
3.	Tremplin FC (8)	0–2	SC Toulon (4)
4.	FC Avignon Ouest (10)	1–4	AS Cannes (4)
5.	Olympique Saint-Maximinois (7)	2–3	ES La Ciotat (7)
6.	US La Cadière (9)	0–6	RC Grasse (4)
7.	FC Saint-Rémy (10)	0–2	FC Rousset Sainte Victoire (5)
8.	Luynes Sports (6)	2–3	AC Le Pontet-Vedène (6)
9.	AS Cagnes-Le Cros (5)	1–2	ES Fosséenne (5)
10.	Avenir Goult Roussillon (9)	1–2	SC Montredon Bonneveine (7)
11.	ES Saint-Zacharie (6)	4–0	Gardia Club (7)
12.	AS Aix-en-Provence (8)	4–1	AS Maximoise (6)
13.	RCB Bollène (9)	0–2	Stade Marseillais UC (6)
14.	FC Istres (5)	6–2	EUGA Ardziv (5)
15.	EM Angloise (7)	0–0 (6–7 p)	AS Vence (6)
16.	ES Milloise (7)	4–0	SC Mouans-Sartoux (8)
17.	AS Brignoles (8)	1–3	ÉFC Fréjus Saint-Raphaël (4)
18.	FC Beausoleil (7)	1–3	Aubagne FC (4)

=== Fifth round ===
These matches were played on 14 and 15 October 2023.

Fifth Round Results: Méditerranée
Tie no	Home team (Tier)	Score	Away team (Tier)
1.	AS Vence (6)	1–2	Hyères FC (4)
2.	ES Fosséenne (5)	1–1 (4–2 p)	SC Toulon (4)
3.	ES Saint-Zacharie (6)	1–1 (2–4 p)	Aubagne FC (4)
4.	ES La Ciotat (7)	1–4	Marignane Gignac Côte Bleue FC (3)
5.	ES Milloise (7)	1–2	FC Martigues (3)
6.	RC Grasse (4)	3–1	ÉFC Fréjus Saint-Raphaël (4)
7.	SC Montredon Bonneveine (7)	0–0 (4–3 p)	FC Rousset Sainte Victoire (5)
8.	US Mandelieu-La Napoule (7)	2–1	AC Le Pontet-Vedène (6)
9.	AS Aix-en-Provence (8)	0–4	AS Cannes (4)
10.	Stade Marseillais UC (6)	0–0 (10–11 p)	FC Istres (5)

=== Sixth round ===
These matches were played on 28 and 29 October 2023.

Sixth Round Results: Méditerranée
Tie no	Home team (Tier)	Score	Away team (Tier)
1.	ES Fosséenne (5)	1–1 (6–5 p)	Marignane Gignac Côte Bleue FC (3)
2.	SC Montredon Bonneveine (7)	0–3	AS Cannes (4)
3.	US Mandelieu-La Napoule (7)	0–1	Aubagne FC (4)
4.	FC Istres (5)	0–0 (3–4 p)	Hyères FC (4)
5.	FC Martigues (3)	1–0	RC Grasse (4)
