= 2022–23 Coupe de France preliminary rounds, Méditerranée =

The 2022–23 Coupe de France preliminary rounds, Méditerranée is the qualifying competition to decide which teams from the leagues of the Méditerranée region of France take part in the main competition from the seventh round.

A total of five teams will qualify from the Méditerranée preliminary rounds.

In 2021–22, AS Cannes progressed furthest in the competition, reaching the round of 32 by beating Ligue 2 side Dijon FCO, before losing narrowly to Toulouse FC from the same division.

== Draws and fixtures ==
On 26 July 2022, the league published the first round draw, with 174 teams from the district leagues and Régional 2 entering at this stage. The second round draw was published on 23 August 2022, with the remaining 26 Regional level teams entering at this stage. The third round draw, which saw the entrance of the six teams from Championnat National 3 and the qualifying team from Saint-Pierre-et-Miquelon, took place live on Facebook on 31 August 2022. The fourth round draw, which saw the six teams from Championnat National 2 enter the competition, also tool place live on Facebook on 15 September 2022.

The fifth round draw, which saw the entry of the team from Championnat National, was published on 7 October 2022. The sixth round draw was published on 10 October 2022.

=== First round ===
These matches were played on 19 and 20 August 2022.

First round results: Méditerranée
Tie no	Home team (tier)	Score	Away team (tier)
1.	Olympique Eyraguais (9)	1–3	FC Mollégès Eygalières (9)
2.	RFC Toulon (U20) (Note: RFC Toulon fielded their Under-20 team in the competition, due to not having a senior team.)	0–5	ES La Ciotat (7)
3.	FC Pugetois (10)	4–7	US Sanary (9)
4.	Etoile Claret Montety (none)	0–3 (Note: Tie won by means of forfeit.)	JS Mourillonnaise (10)
5.	CA Digne 04 (8)	0–3	US Farenque (10)
6.	AS Aix-en-Provence (8)	4–0	Étoile Huveaune (9)
7.	FC Châteauneuf La Mède (9)	3–2	JS Istréenne (10)
8.	JS Puy Sainte Réparade (none)	0–3	JS Pennes Mirabeau (9)
9.	Phocea Club Marseille (10)	0–9	FC Septèmes (8)
10.	ES Vitrolles (10)	1–5	AS Martigues Sud (8)
11.	US 1er Canton Marseille (9)	0–1	Olympique Rovenain (8)
12.	Gardanne Biver FC (8)	1–2	AS Bouc Bel Air (8)
13.	FC Saint-Mitre-les-Remparts (10)	0–4	AS Mazargues (7)
14.	US Venelles (9)	6–2	AS Simiane-Collongue (9)
15.	FC Belgentier (10)	2–1	FC Lavandou Bormes (9)
16.	US Bandol (10)	0–3	FCUS Tropézienne (7)
17.	Gardia Club (8)	3–0	UA Valettoise (8)
18.	FC Céreste-Reillanne (8)	0–3	EP Manosque (8)
19.	SC Althen-des-Paluds (10)	0–5	RC Provence (9)
20.	Pays d'Apt Football (none)	0–3	AS Bédarrides (10)
21.	FC Cheval Blanc (9)	2–2 (2–4 p)	FA Châteaurenard (8)
22.	Entente Saint-Jean-du-Grès (10)	0–2	EJGC Graveson (10)
23.	FC Saint-Rémy (9)	5–0	AS Rasteau (10)
24.	Olympique Novais (8)	1–2	Olympique Montelais (7)
25.	Calavon FC (10)	3–6	US Autre Provence (7)
26.	FC Cannes Ranguin (10)	2–1	ES Contoise (9)
27.	Saint-Paul-la-Colle OC (10)	1–3	AS Valleroise (11)
28.	US Valbonne (8)	1–2	SC Mouans-Sartoux (8)
29.	AO Tourrette-Levens (10)	0–3	FC Mougins Côte d'Azur (7)
30.	Stade Laurentin (9)	2–2 (5–4 p)	FC Antibes (8)
31.	Orange FC (9)	3–0	ES Lorguaise (10)
32.	SC Vinonnais (8)	0–3	US Vivo 04 (8)
33.	US Châteauneuf Aubignosc Peipin (9)	1–4	FC Sisteron (8)
34.	US Pélican (9)	1–3	US Miramas (9)
35.	FO Ventabren (10)	1–3	SC Saint-Martinois (10)
36.	ÉS Port-Saint-Louis-du-Rhône (10)	3–1	CA Croix Sainte (10)
37.	AS Rognac (9)	0–1	ES Milloise (7)
38.	SC Frais Vallon (10)	5–2	SO Septèmes (10)
39.	Le Muy FC (11)	1–2	CA Cannetois (9)
40.	FC Revestois (10)	0–6	SO Londais (7)
41.	AS Arcoise (9)	1–1 (4–5 p)	US Ollioulaise (9)
42.	SC Nansais (9)	– (Note: SC Nansais penalised, FC Pays du Fayence qualify. Original scoreline unknown.)	FC Pays du Fayence (9)
43.	US Veynes-Serres (8)	3–5	AFC Sainte-Tulle-Pierrevert (8)
44.	US Caderousse (10)	1–1 (5–4 p) (Note: US Caderousse penalised, AS Camaretois qualify.)	AS Camaretois (8)
45.	ES Boulbon (8)	3–1	RCB Bollène (9)
46.	Caumont FC (8)	3–0	FC Carpentras (9)
47.	ARC Cavaillon (9)	1–2	SC Gadagne (9)
48.	Tarascon SC (9)	2–2 (2–4 p)	US Avignonnaise (9)
49.	FC Aureille (10)	8–1	FC Aptésien (11)
50.	SO Velleronnais (10)	0–4	JS Visannaise (8)
51.	US Planaise (10)	2–6	EM Angloise (8)
52.	AS Piolenc (10)	0–3	FA Val Durance (7)
53.	FC Euro African (10)	2–3	AS Moulins (8)
54.	FC Cimiez (11)	1–1 (4–5 p)	CA Peymeinade (8)
55.	FC Vallées Var Vaïre (11)	0–6	AS Roquefort (9)
56.	ÉS Saint-André (10)	0–3	AS Roquebrune-Cap-Martin (8)
57.	Étoile d'Aubune (9)	3–0	SC Mondragon (10)
58.	FC Carnoules (11)	0–8	Entente ASPTT Hospitaliers Toulon (8)
59.	AS Traminots Alpes Maritimes (11)	3–2	Trinité SFC (9)
60.	Montet Bornala Club de Nice (9)	2–4	Entente Saint-Sylvestre Nice Nord (7)
61.	CAS Eaux Nice (11)	2–1	CDJ Antibes (8)
62.	SO Roquettan (10)	0–2	FC Beausoleil (8)
63.	Drap Football (10)	1–3	US Biot (10)
64.	FC Saint-Étienne-du-Grès (11)	1–1 (3–1 p)	US Saint-Saturnin-lès-Avignon (10)
65.	CS Sarrians (10)	2–2 (1–3 p)	Dentelles FC (10)
66.	SC Rognonais (10)	1–3	Avenir Goult Roussillon (10)
67.	OM Luberon (10)	2–2 (5–4 p)	AS Valayannaise (10)
68.	Réveil Grozeau Malaucène (11)	6–0	Les Blue Devils de Mirabel (11)
69.	US Thoroise (10)	3–1	Boxeland Club Islois (9)
70.	AS Saint-Cyr (9)	0–5	FC Seynois (9)
71.	AS Sainte-Marguerite (10)	2–11	USPEG Marseille (10)
72.	AS Estérel (8)	3–2	Tremplin FC (9)
73.	SC Tourvain (11)	0–10	Olympique Saint-Maximinois (7)
74.	SC Rougierois (10)	3–1	Entente Pivotte Serinette (10)
75.	JS Beaussetanne (9)	0–1	AS Mar Vivo (9)
76.	ASPTT Hyères (10)	0–3	SC Cogolin (8)
77.	US La Cadière (9)	2–3	RC La Baie (10)
78.	Besse Sport (none)	0–3	ES Solliès-Farlède (8)
79.	AS Brignoles (9)	1–1 (7–6 p)	SC Draguignan (7)
80.	USM Meyreuil (10)	1–0	CA Plan-de-Cuques (9)
81.	SC Kartala (10)	3–3 (6–5 p)	Burel FC (9)
82.	US Saint-Barthélemy Marseillais (10)	1–4	SC Cayolle (8)
83.	ES Pennoise (9)	2–2 (4–2 p)	SC Montredon Bonneveine (8)
84.	ES Villeneuve-Loubet (10)	0–8	US Cap d'Ail (7)
85.	ES des Baous (8)	2–2 (7–8 p)	FC Carros (9)
86.	SC Allauch (9)	3–2	ES Cuges (10)
87.	US Saint-Mandrier (8)	1–3	US Pradet (8)

=== Second round ===
These matches were played on 28 August 2022.

Second round results: Méditerranée
Tie no	Home team (tier)	Score	Away team (tier)
1.	US Vivo 04 (8)	2–2 (3–5 p)	Gap Foot 05 (7)
2.	AFC Sainte-Tulle-Pierrevert (8)	1–5	EP Manosque (8)
3.	FC Sisteron (8)	2–4 (Note: Tie reversed from original draw.)	US Farenque (10)
4.	Berre SC (7)	3–1	Stade Marseillais UC (6)
5.	ÉS Port-Saint-Louis-du-Rhône (10)	0–2	AC Arlésien (6)
6.	AS Martigues Sud (8)	1–1 (4–5 p)	ES Fosséenne (6)
7.	SC Cayolle (8)	1–3	US Marseille Endoume (6)
8.	USM Meyreuil (10)	1–10	Salon Bel Air (7)
9.	SC Saint-Martinois (10)	2–5	Luynes Sports (7)
10.	ES Pennoise (9)	2–2 (3–5 p)	AS Gémenos (7)
11.	USPEG Marseille (10)	1–4	SC Allauch (9)
12.	SC Kartala (10)	2–2 (5–4 p) (Note: SC Kartala penalised for fielding a suspended player, AS Aix-en-Provence qualify.)	AS Aix-en-Provence (8)
13.	US Miramas (9)	2–4	ES Milloise (7)
14.	SC Frais Vallon (10)	2–2 (3–4 p)	FC Septèmes (8)
15.	AS Bouc Bel Air (8)	1–2	AS Mazargues (7)
16.	Olympique Rovenain (8)	0–3	US Venelles (9)
17.	US Cuers-Pierrefeu (7)	3–2	US Carqueiranne-La Crau (6)
18.	AS Brignoles (9)	1–3	ES Saint-Zacharie (6)
19.	AS Mar Vivo (9)	0–3	Six-Fours Le Brusc FC (6)
20.	SC Cogolin (8)	6–0	CA Cannetois (9)
21.	ES Solliès-Farlède (8)	3–3 (5–3 p)	AS Maximoise (6)
22.	RC La Baie (10)	1–4	FC Ramatuelle (7)
23.	US Pradet (8)	1–2	SO Londais (7)
24.	US Ollioulaise (9)	1–5	Gardia Club (8)
25.	US Sanary (9)	1–2	FCUS Tropézienne (7)
26.	FC Belgentier (10)	0–3	ES La Ciotat (7)
27.	JS Mourillonnaise (10)	1–5	FC Pays du Fayence (9)
28.	SC Rougierois (10)	0–5	Olympique Saint-Maximinois (7)
29.	Entente ASPTT Hospitaliers Toulon (8)	1–1 (1–4 p)	FC Seynois (9)
30.	AC Le Pontet-Vedène (6)	3–1	SC Courthézon (7)
31.	FC Mollégès Eygalières (9)	2–2 (4–3 p)	Olympic Barbentane (7)
32.	Réveil Grozeau Malaucène (11)	4–0	US Thoroise (10)
33.	FC Saint-Étienne-du-Grès (11)	1–5	FC Saint-Rémy (9)
34.	SC Gadagne (9)	1–1 (4–5 p)	Stade Maillanais (7)
35.	RC Provence (9)	1–1 (2–3 p)	FC Aureille (10)
36.	AS Bédarrides (10)	1–4	Étoile d'Aubune (9)
37.	FA Châteaurenard (8)	1–3	ES Boulbon (8)
38.	Orange FC (9)	3–1	OM Luberon (10)
39.	US Avignonnaise (9)	0–0 (4–2 p)	FA Val Durance (7)
40.	Avenir Goult Roussillon (10)	0–5	Dentelles FC (10)
41.	JS Visannaise (8)	0–4	EM Angloise (8)
42.	AS Camaretois (8)	1–0	Olympique Montelais (7)
43.	Espérance Pernoise (7)	1–0	US Autre Provence (7)
44.	EJGC Graveson (10)	0–3	Caumont FC (8)
45.	RO Menton (7)	1–1 (1–3 p)	US Mandelieu-La Napoule (6)
46.	AS Traminots Alpes Maritimes (11)	1–11	Villefranche Saint-Jean Beaulieu FC (6)
47.	CAS Eaux Nice (11)	0–3	US Pegomas (7)
48.	Entente Saint-Sylvestre Nice Nord (7)	3–3 (13–14 p)	AS Fontonne Antibes (7)
49.	FC Mougins Côte d'Azur (7)	9–0	AS Estérel (8)
50.	FC Cannes Ranguin (10)	1–2	CA Peymeinade (8)
51.	AS Roquefort (9)	4–0	AS Valleroise (11)
52.	AS Roquebrune-Cap-Martin (8)	1–1 (5–6 p)	FC Beausoleil (8)
53.	SC Mouans-Sartoux (8)	2–0	AS Moulins (8)
54.	Stade Laurentin (9)	0–3	US Cap d'Ail (7)
55.	US Biot (10)	0–4	AS Vence (6)
56.	FC Carros (9)	1–5	AS Cagnes-Le Cros (6)
57.	JS Pennes Mirabeau (9)	3–3 (3–0 p)	FC Châteauneuf La Mède (9)

=== Third round ===
These matches were played on 10 and 11 September 2022.

Third round results: Méditerranée
Tie no	Home team (tier)	Score	Away team (tier)
1.	US Venelles (9)	0–3	AS Cagnes-Le Cros (6)
2.	EM Angloise (8)	1–2	AC Arlésien (6)
3.	Luynes Sports (7)	6–0	A.S. Îlienne Amateur (Saint Pierre and Miquelon)
4.	Olympique Saint-Maximinois (7)	1–3	FC Rousset Sainte Victoire (5)
5.	AS Mazargues (7)	2–1	Espérance Pernoise (7)
6.	AC Le Pontet-Vedène (6)	4–0	Berre SC (7)
7.	Étoile d'Aubune (9)	2–5	Salon Bel Air (7)
8.	Gap Foot 05 (7)	3–2	ES Milloise (7)
9.	Réveil Grozeau Malaucène (11)	1–2	AS Gémenos (7)
10.	US Avignonnaise (9)	0–4	FC Istres (5)
11.	Dentelles FC (10)	0–0 (4–1 p)	Orange FC (9)
12.	Stade Maillanais (7)	1–5	ES Fosséenne (6)
13.	FC Aureille (10)	0–9	US Marseille Endoume (6)
14.	FC Saint-Rémy (9)	3–1	AS Camaretois (8)
15.	ES Boulbon (8)	1–4	Caumont FC (8)
16.	FC Mollégès Eygalières (9)	1–8	Carnoux FC (5)
17.	FC Septèmes (8)	3–3 (4–5 p)	EUGA Ardziv (5)
18.	US Farenque (10)	1–4	ES La Ciotat (7)
19.	EP Manosque (8)	3–3 (5–3 p)	ES Saint-Zacharie (6)
20.	FC Pays du Fayence (9)	1–4	SC Cogolin (8)
21.	FC Mougins Côte d'Azur (7)	3–0	US Cuers-Pierrefeu (7)
22.	Villefranche Saint-Jean Beaulieu FC (6)	1–2	ES Cannet Rocheville (5)
23.	FC Seynois (9)	0–3	FC Beausoleil (8)
24.	FC Ramatuelle (7)	3–1	SO Londais (7)
25.	JS Pennes Mirabeau (9)	1–2	FCUS Tropézienne (7)
26.	AS Roquefort (9)	2–2 (4–5 p)	US Mandelieu-La Napoule (6)
27.	SC Allauch (9)	1–1 (4–5 p)	AS Vence (6)
28.	US Pegomas (7)	3–2	SC Mouans-Sartoux (8)
29.	AS Aix-en-Provence (8)	4–2	AS Fontonne Antibes (7)
30.	Six-Fours Le Brusc FC (6)	0–1	AS Cannes (5)
31.	US Cap d'Ail (7)	5–1	ES Solliès-Farlède (8)
32.	Gardia Club (8)	0–1	CA Peymeinade (8)

=== Fourth round ===
These matches were played on 24 and 25 September 2022.

Fourth round results: Méditerranée
Tie no	Home team (tier)	Score	Away team (tier)
1.	EUGA Ardziv (5)	1–1 (5–3 p)	AS Vence (6)
2.	FC Saint-Rémy (9)	0–2	AS Mazargues (7)
3.	AS Aix-en-Provence (8)	2–5 (Note: EP Manosque penalised for fielding too many transferred players, AS Aix-en-Provence qualify.)	EP Manosque (8)
4.	Salon Bel Air (7)	4–1	FC Beausoleil (8)
5.	AC Arlésien (6)	3–3 (3–4 p)	AS Cagnes-Le Cros (6)
6.	Caumont FC (8)	0–6	ÉFC Fréjus Saint-Raphaël (4)
7.	SC Cogolin (8)	0–1	Luynes Sports (7)
8.	ES La Ciotat (7)	1–3	Hyères FC (4)
9.	FC Istres (5)	1–1 (6–5 p)	AC Le Pontet-Vedène (6)
10.	CA Peymeinade (8)	0–2	FC Ramatuelle (7)
11.	AS Gémenos (7)	1–3	AS Cannes (5)
12.	US Mandelieu-La Napoule (6)	0–0 (5–6 p)	FCUS Tropézienne (7)
13.	ES Fosséenne (6)	1–1 (5–3 p)	Marignane Gignac Côte Bleue FC (4)
14.	FC Mougins Côte d'Azur (7)	0–0 (2–4 p)	ES Cannet Rocheville (5)
15.	Dentelles FC (10)	1–2	US Cap d'Ail (7)
16.	Gap Foot 05 (7)	0–1	RC Grasse (4)
17.	US Marseille Endoume (6)	1–4	SC Toulon (4)
18.	US Pegomas (7)	0–0 (2–3 p)	Aubagne FC (4)
19.	FC Rousset Sainte Victoire (5)	2–1	Carnoux FC (5)

=== Fifth round ===
These matches were played on 8 and 9 October 2022.

Fifth round results: Méditerranée
Tie no	Home team (tier)	Score	Away team (tier)
1.	Luynes Sports (7)	0–0 (1–3 p)	RC Grasse (4)
2.	EUGA Ardziv (5)	1–1 (5–4 p)	ES Fosséenne (6)
3.	SC Toulon (4)	2–1	FC Rousset Sainte Victoire (5)
4.	FCUS Tropézienne (7)	0–3	Aubagne FC (4)
5.	AS Mazargues (7)	1–3	AS Aix-en-Provence (8)
6.	US Cap d'Ail (7)	4–0	AS Cagnes-Le Cros (6)
7.	Hyères FC (4)	2–1	FC Istres (5)
8.	ÉFC Fréjus Saint-Raphaël (4)	1–1 (3–2 p)	AS Cannes (5)
9.	Salon Bel Air (7)	2–1	FC Martigues (3)
10.	FC Ramatuelle (7)	0–2	ES Cannet Rocheville (5)

=== Sixth round ===
These matches were played on 15 and 16 October 2022.

Sixth round results: Méditerranée
Tie no	Home team (tier)	Score	Away team (tier)
1.	AS Aix-en-Provence (8)	0–5	SC Toulon (4)
2.	RC Grasse (4)	5–1	EUGA Ardziv (5)
3.	ES Cannet Rocheville (5)	2–2 (2–4 p)	Aubagne FC (4)
4.	Salon Bel Air (7)	1–6	ÉFC Fréjus Saint-Raphaël (4)
5.	US Cap d'Ail (7)	0–4	Hyères FC (4)
