= 2022–23 Coupe de France preliminary rounds =

2022–23 Coupe de France
Coupe Charles Simon

Tournament details
- Country: France

The 2022–23 Coupe de France preliminary rounds make up the qualifying competition to decide which teams take part in the main competition from the seventh round. This is the 106th season of the main football cup competition of France. The competition is organised by the French Football Federation (FFF) and is normally open to all clubs in French football, as well as clubs from the overseas departments and territories (Guadeloupe, French Guiana, Martinique, Mayotte, New Caledonia, Tahiti, Réunion, Saint Martin, and Saint Pierre and Miquelon).

The six (or more, if required) preliminary rounds are organised by the 13 Regional leagues from the mainland, and the 6 Regional leagues of the overseas departments and territories. They took place between May and November 2022.

== Schedule ==
Although all mainland regions follow a set schedule from the third round, regions are allowed to set their own schedules for earlier rounds, including any preliminaries required. The general schedule published by the FFF saw all rounds brought forward compared to previous seasons, due to the 2022 FIFA World Cup. Some mainland regions elected to hold their early rounds at the end of the 2021–22 season, rather the normal August dates.

Overseas territories organise their own qualifying tournaments, aligning with entry into the main tournament at the seventh round.

Round	Date
Third round	11 September 2022
Fourth round	25 September 2022
Fifth round	9 October 2022
Sixth round	16 October 2022

== Leagues ==
The details of the qualifying rounds for each league is separated out to individual articles, to avoid this article being too lengthy.

=== Overseas leagues ===
A total of eleven clubs will qualify from the overseas leagues, two each from Guadeloupe, French Guiana, Martinique, Réunion, and one each from Mayotte, New Caledonia and Tahiti.

In 2021–22, Saint-Denis FC from Réunion and AS Jumeaux de M'zouazia from Mayotte both made it to the round of 64, losing to Jura Sud Foot and Girondins de Bordeaux respectively.

==== Mayotte ====
On 13 May 2022, the Mayotte league announced that 78 teams had entered the competition, from Régionale divisions 1 to 4. In the first round, 28 of the Régionale 4 teams would enter, with the other two receiving byes to the second round. By the league's own regulations, the 12 Régionale 1 teams should enter at the third round stage, meaning 20 teams would need to qualify from the second round. The league stated that "this calculation remains difficult" so took the decision to exempt everyone from the second round, leading to 64 teams in the third round (14 first round qualifiers + 12 Régionale 2 teams + 24 Régionale 3 teams + 12 Régionale 1 teams). The third round draw was published on 10 June 2022. The 16ème de Finale, or Round of 32, draw was published on 3 August 2022. The 8ème de Finale, or Round of 16, draw was published on 17 August 2022. The quarter final and semi final draw were made together and published on 31 August 2022.

This match was played on 15 October 2022.

Final results: Mayotte
Tie no	Home team (tier)	Score	Away team (tier)
1.	(Mayotte) Diables Noirs (R1)	5–2	AS Rosador (R1) (Mayotte)

Note: Mayotte League structure (no promotion to French League structure):
Régionale 1 (R1)
Régionale 2 (R2)
Régionale 3 (R3)
Régionale 4 (R4)

==== Réunion ====
The first of the preliminary rounds in Réunion was drawn on or before 24 May 2022, and saw the entry of 8 clubs from Régional 1 and 12 clubs from Super 2, a newly created second-tier division. 6 clubs from Régional 1 were given byes. Subsequent draws were published only on the league's official Facebook page. The second preliminary round draw, named the fourth round by the league (to align with the main competition) was published on 10 June 2022. The fifth round draw was published on 31 August 2022. The sixth round draw was published on 1 October 2022.

These matches were played on 9 October 2022.

Sixth round results: Réunion
Tie no	Home team (tier)	Score	Away team (tier)
1.	(Réunion) AS Excelsior (R1)	0–1	La Tamponnaise (R1) (Réunion)
2.	(Réunion) US Sainte-Marienne (R1)	0–2	JS Saint-Pierroise (R1) (Réunion)

Note: Reúnion League structure (no promotion to French League structure):
Régional 1 (R1)
Super 2 (S2)

==== French Guiana ====
On 5 July 2022, the league published the structure and the draw in full for the qualifying competition, in which 39 teams would compete. To maintain alignment with the mainland competition, qualifying began with the second round, where fourteen teams entered. The remaining 25 teams entered at the third round stage.

These matches were played on 8 October 2022.

Sixth round results: French Guiana
Tie no	Home team (tier)	Score	Away team (tier)
1.	ASU Grand Santi (R1)	1–0	US Sinnamary (R1)
2.	Le Geldar De Kourou (R1)	3–0	CSC Cayenne (R1)

Note: French Guiana League structure (no promotion to French League structure):
Régional 1 (R1)
Régional 2 (R2)

==== Martinique ====
On 21 July 2022, the league published the draw for the first round of the qualifying competition, at the time labelled 1er Tour, but later referred to as 2e Tour, or second round. The 26 ties in this round, and the 6 byes required to form 16 ties in the next round, made for a total of 58 teams taking part in the qualifying competition.

Subsequent draws were only published on the league's official Facebook page, usually just before the games took place. The third round draw was published on 1 September 2022. The fourth round draw was published on 14 September 2022. The fifth round draw was published on 4 October 2022. The sixth round draw was published on 17 October 2022.

These matches were played on 18 and 19 October 2022.

Sixth round results: Martinique
Tie no	Home team (tier)	Score	Away team (tier)
1.	(Martinique) Golden Lion FC (R1)	2–0	CO Trénelle (R1) (Martinique)
2.	(Martinique) Aiglon du Lamentin FC (R1)	1–1 (4–3 p)	AS Samaritaine (R1) (Martinique)

Note: Martinique League structure (no promotion to French League structure):
Régionale 1 (R1)
Régionale 2 (R2)
Régionale 3 (R3)

==== Guadeloupe ====
On 25 July 2022, the league confirmed that 54 teams had entered from the territory, meaning that the competition would commence at the second round, and a number of teams from Régionale 1 would be exempt to the third round in order to have the correct number of clubs at that stage.

The second round fixtures were published on 19 August 2022, some time after the draw was made, with teams split into two groups. Similarly, the third round fixtures were published on 2 September 2022. The fourth round draw was published on 23 September 2022. The fifth round draw was published on 30 September 2022. The sixth round draw was published on 10 October 2022.

These matches were played on 11 and 12 October 2022.

Sixth round results: Guadeloupe
Tie no	Home team (tier)	Score	Away team (tier)
1.	(Guadeloupe) Solidarité-Scolaire (R1)	0–0 (11–12 p)	L'Etoile de Morne-à-l'Eau (R1) (Guadeloupe)
2.	(Guadeloupe) Phare du Canal (R1)	1–1 (4–5 p)	SC Baie-Mahault (R1) (Guadeloupe)

Note: Guadeloupe League structure (no promotion to French League structure):
Ligue Régionale 1 (R1)
Ligue Régionale 2 (R2)
Ligue Régionale 3 (R3)

==== Saint Pierre and Miquelon ====
The Overseas Collectivity of Saint Pierre and Miquelon has only three teams, so there is just one match in each of two rounds, with one team receiving a bye to the second round. Lots were drawn to decide which teams would receive the bye. The first round took place on 6 July 2022, and the second round took place on 23 July 2022. The winner, A.S. Îlienne Amateur, gained entry to the third round draw of the Méditerranée region.

=== Nouvelle-Aquitaine ===
A total of thirteen teams will qualify from the Nouvelle-Aquitaine preliminary rounds.

In 2021–22, Bergerac Périgord FC progressed furthest in the main competition, reaching the quarter-final, where they lost to FC Versailles 78.

On 28 July 2022, the league confirmed that 680 teams from the region had entered the competition. On 29 July 2022, the league published the first round draw, with 284 ties featuring teams from Régional 2, Régional 3 and district divisions.

The second round draw was published on the league's official Facebook page on 31 August 2022, with 189 ties including 94 teams entering from Régional 2 and Régional 1. The third round draw was published in the same place on 7 September 2022, with 100 ties including 11 teams entering from Championnat National 3. The fourth round draw was made live on the league's official Facebook page on 16 September 2022, with the four teams from Championnat National 2 joining the competition. The fifth round draw was also made live on the league's official Facebook page, on 30 September 2022. The sixth round draw was scheduled to be made live on Facebook on 10 October 2022, but due to a technical failure the full draw was published before the video was available.

These matches were played on 15 and 16 October 2022.

Sixth round results: Nouvelle Aquitaine
Tie no	Home team (tier)	Score	Away team (tier)
1.	Angoulême Charente FC (4)	3–2	FC des Portes de l'Entre-Deux-Mers (5)
2.	CA Neuville (5)	2–2 (3–5 p)	Trélissac-Antonne Périgord FC (4)
3.	FC Lescar (6)	0–0 (4–2 p)	Saint-Paul Sport (6)
4.	CA Béglais (7)	1–3	SA Mérignac (6)
5.	FCE Mérignac Arlac (6)	3–0	ES Guérétoise (5)
6.	EF Aubussonnais (8)	0–2	Entente Boé Bon-Encontre (7)
7.	Occitane FC (9)	0–3	AS Merpins (7)
8.	FC Sévigné Jonzac-Saint-Germain (8)	2–3	SO Châtellerault (5)
9.	Aviron Bayonnais FC (5)	0–2	Bergerac Périgord FC (4)
10.	FC Libourne (5)	1–1 (3–4 p)	Stade Poitevin FC (5)
11.	RC Parthenay Viennay (6)	0–1	Stade Bordelais (4)
12.	US Lège Cap Ferret (5)	1–1 (4–3 p)	US Chauvigny (5)
13.	FC Chauray (6)	3–0	FC Charente Limousine (7)

=== Pays de la Loire ===
A total of eleven teams will qualify from the Pays de la Loire preliminary rounds.

In 2021–22, La Roche VF progressed furthest in the main competition, reaching the round of 32, where they lost to eventual semi-finalists FC Versailles 78.

On 19 July 2022, the league confirmed 522 teams had entered the competition. On 21 July 2022 the draw for the first round was published, with 221 matches featuring teams from Régional 3 and the district sides, with just two Régional 3 sides receiving byes to the second round.

The second round draw was published on 30 August 2022, with 41 teams (from Régional 2 and the exempted Régional 3 sides) entering.

The third round draw was made on 7 September 2022, with 19 teams from Régional 1 and 12 from Championnat National 3 joining the 131 qualifiers from the second round, for a total of 81 fixtures.

The fourth round draw was made live on the league's official Facebook page on 14 September 2022. The three teams from Championnat National 2 joined the competition at this stage.

The fifth round draw took place on 29 September 2022, with the two teams from Championnat National joining the competition at this stage. The sixth round draw took place in an Intermarché shop in La Roche-sur-Yon on 11 October 2022.

These matches were played on 16 October 2022.

Sixth round results: Pays de la Loire
Tie no	Home team (tier)	Score	Away team (tier)
1.	ES Blain (7)	1–3	AS La Châtaigneraie (6)
2.	US Nautique Spay (7)	1–1 (5–6 p)	AC Basse-Goulaine (6)
3.	Sablé FC (5)	4–0	AS Sautron (6)
4.	AS Vieillevigne-La Planche (7)	0–1	Voltigeurs de Châteaubriant (4)
5.	ASO Montenay (9)	0–2	Orvault SF (6)
6.	Mareuil SC (7)	2–0	FC Saint-Julien Divatte (7)
7.	FC Olonne Château (6)	1–3	SO Cholet (3)
8.	NDC Angers (6)	2–1	Élan de Gorges Foot (7)
9.	Pornic Foot (7)	1–1 (3–4 p)	JSC Bellevue Nantes (6)
10.	FC Côteaux du Vignoble (9)	1–4	Les Herbiers VF (4)
11.	Olympique Saumur FC (4)	0–4	Le Mans FC (3)

=== Centre-Val de Loire ===
A total of six teams will qualify from the Centre-Val de Loire preliminary rounds.

In 2021–22, C'Chartres Football progressed furthest in the main competition, reaching the round of 64, where they were beaten by US Chauvigny, from the division below, and missing out on a tie against Olympique de Marseille in the next round.

In late April 2022, the league published their plans to hold three preliminary rounds in June 2022. However, when the first round draw was made on 31 May 2022, this had been reduced to one round in June and one in August. 104 teams from the District divisions entered at the first round stage, with 23 District 1 teams given byes to the second round.

The second round draw was also published on 20 July 2022, with 77 teams from divisions up to Régional 1 entering at this stage. The third round draw was published on 30 August 2022, with 10 teams from Championnat National 3 joining the 66 qualifiers from the second round for a total of 38 ties. The fourth round draw was published on 14 September 2022, with the 6 teams from Championnat National 2 joining at this stage. The fifth and sixth rounds were drawn together on 27 September 2022, with the two teams from Championnat National joining the competition at the fifth round stage.

These matches were played on 15 and 16 October 2022.

Sixth round results: Centre-Val de Loire
Tie no	Home team (tier)	Score	Away team (tier)
1.	FC Portugais Selles-sur-Cher (10)	0–2	FC Saint-Doulchard (7)
2.	Bourges Foot 18 (4)	5–1	US Châteauneuf-sur-Loire (5)
3.	Vierzon FC (4)	2–0	SO Romorantin (4)
4.	J3S Amilly (6)	1–5	LB Châteauroux (3)
5.	Avoine OCC (5)	1–1 (8–7 p)	US Orléans (3)
6.	USM Olivet (7)	1–5	Saint-Pryvé Saint-Hilaire FC (4)

=== Corsica ===
Two teams will qualify from the Corsica preliminary rounds.

In 2021–22, both qualifying teams, FC Bastia-Borgo and Gazélec Ajaccio made it to the eighth round. FC Bastia-Borgo lost at ES Cannet Rocheville, a team from two divisions below them, whilst Gazélec Ajaccio lost to Red Star F.C.

On 18 August 2022, the league announced that a total of 33 teams from the region had entered. At the same time, the structure of the qualifying competition was announced. A preliminary round, analogous to the second round in other regions, featured six clubs, drawn from a twelve entering from Régional 3 and Régional 4. The winners progressed to the third round, where they were joined by all other clubs from Championnat National 3 and below. The draw for the third round was published on 1 September 2022. The draw for the fourth round, which saw the entry of the one Championnat National 2 team from the region, was published on 15 September 2022. The fifth round draw, which saw the entry of the one Championnat National team from the region, was published on 29 September 2022. The sixth round draw was published on 10 October 2022.

These matches were played on 16 October 2022.

Sixth round results: Corsica
Tie no	Home team (tier)	Score	Away team (tier)
1.	Afa FA (6)	1–4	FC Borgo (3)
2.	Sud FC (7)	0–3	GC Lucciana (5)

=== Bourgogne-Franche-Comté ===
A total of eight teams will qualify from the Bourgogne-Franche-Comté preliminary rounds.

In 2021–22, Jura Sud Foot progressed the furthest in the competition, reaching the round of 32, where they were beaten by AS Saint-Étienne in a game marred by crowd trouble.

On 13 July 2022, the league announced that 401 teams had entered from the region. On the same day the first round draw was published, with 324 teams from Régional 2 and below involved in 166 ties, and 23 teams from Régional 2 and Régional 3 exempted.

The second round draw was published on 23 August 2022, with 108 ties and 50 new entrants comprising the exempted first round teams and the teams from Régional 1. The third round draw, including the 12 teams from Championnat National 3, was published on 30 August 2022.

The fourth round draw was published on 13 September 2022, with four teams from Championnat National 2 entering at this stage.

The fifth and sixth round draws were published on 27 September 2022.

These matches were played on 15 and 16 October 2022.

Sixth round results: Bourgogne-Franche-Comté
Tie no	Home team (tier)	Score	Away team (tier)
1.	Jura Dolois Football (5)	6–0	US Cheminots Dijonnais (6)
2.	Racing Besançon (4)	1–4	ASM Belfort (4)
3.	ALC Longvic (8)	0–6	Louhans-Cuiseaux FC (4)
4.	FC 4 Rivières 70 (6)	2–3	UF Mâconnais (5)
5.	CL Marsannay-la-Côte (7)	0–5	ASC Saint-Apollinaire (5)
6.	Jura Sud Foot (4)	4–0	FC Grandvillars (5)
7.	Union Cosnoise Sportive (5)	4–0	Bresse Jura Foot (6)
8.	FC Morteau-Montlebon (5)	0–2	FC Gueugnon (5)

=== Grand Est ===
A total of nineteen teams will qualify from the Grand Est preliminary rounds. Preliminary rounds are due to start in August 2022.

In 2021–22, ES Thaon progressed furthest in the competition, reaching the round of 32, where they were narrowly beaten in stoppage time by Ligue 1 side Stade de Reims.

On 29 July 2022, the league published the first round draw, made up of 437 ties, and the list of 103 teams exempted to future rounds, thereby confirming that 977 teams from the region had entered.

The league published the second round draw on 23 August 2022, with 45 teams from Régional 2 entering at this stage. The third round draw was published on 6 September 2022, With 49 teams from Régional 1 and Championnat National 3 entering the competition, and 145 ties drawn.

The fourth round draw was published on 15 September 2022, with the three teams from Championnat National 2 entering at this stage.

The fifth round draw was published on 28 September 2022, and saw the two teams from Championnat National entering the competition. The sixth round draw was published on 11 October 2022.

These matches were played on 15 and 16 October 2022.

Sixth round results: Grand Est
Tie no	Home team (tier)	Score	Away team (tier)
1.	AS Ludres (8)	1–5	ES Thaon (5)
2.	EF Reims Sainte-Anne (5)	5–1	CS Sedan Ardennes (3)
3.	ES Heillecourt (7)	3–1 (Note: The match between ES Heillecourt and USAG Uckange was abandoned after a pitch invasion, and is under invesitgation by the committee of the Ligue de Grand Est. On 25 October 2022, the league ruled in favour of ES Heillecourt, who qualify for the seventh round.)	USAG Uckange (7)
4.	Cormontreuil FC (6)	0–1	ES Villerupt-Thil (6)
5.	AS Prix-lès-Mézières (5)	2–0	FC Bogny (6)
6.	COS Villers (7)	2–2 (7–6 p)	ES Rosselange Vitry (7)
7.	US Biesles (9)	0–2	SC Marnaval (6)
8.	FC Saint-Meziery (6)	0–1	SAS Épinal (4)
9.	FC Bassin Piennois (6)	0–4	ES Gandrange (6)
10.	Racing HW 96 (8)	0–5	FCSR Haguenau (4)
11.	AS Ohlungen (8)	0–6	AS Nancy Lorraine (3)
12.	FCO Strasbourg Koenigshoffen 06 (6)	5–0	Sarreguemines FC (6)
13.	AS Huningue (6)	0–2	US Raon-l'Étape (5)
14.	FC Dahlenheim (8)	0–3	US Sarre-Union (5)
15.	FC Longeville-lès-Saint-Avold (8)	1–4	SSEP Hombourg-Haut (7)
16.	FC Geispolsheim 01 (6)	1–1 (5–3 p)	FC Sarrebourg (6)
17.	FA Illkirch Graffenstaden (5)	0–1	FC Saint-Louis Neuweg (6)
18.	AS Illzach Modenheim (6)	3–1	FC Wintzfelden-Osenbach (7)
19.	US Reipertswiller (6)	5–2	US Oberschaeffolsheim (7)

=== Méditerranée ===
A total of five teams will qualify from the Méditerranée preliminary rounds. Preliminary rounds are due to start in August 2022.

In 2021–22, AS Cannes progressed furthest in the competition, reaching the round of 32 by beating Ligue 2 side Dijon FCO, before losing narrowly to Toulouse FC from the same division.

On 26 July 2022, the league published the first round draw, with 174 teams from the district leagues and Régional 2 entering at this stage. The second round draw was published on 23 August 2022, with the remaining 26 Regional level teams entering at this stage. The third round draw, which saw the entrance of the six teams from Championnat National 3 and the qualifying team from Saint-Pierre-et-Miquelon, took place live on Facebook on 31 August 2022. The fourth round draw, which saw the six teams from Championnat National 2 enter the competition, also tool place live on Facebook on 15 September 2022.

The fifth round draw, which saw the entry of the team from Championnat National, was published on 7 October 2022. The sixth round draw was published on 10 October 2022.

These matches were played on 15 and 16 October 2022.

Sixth round results: Méditerranée
Tie no	Home team (tier)	Score	Away team (tier)
1.	AS Aix-en-Provence (8)	0–5	SC Toulon (4)
2.	RC Grasse (4)	5–1	EUGA Ardziv (5)
3.	ES Cannet Rocheville (5)	2–2 (2–4 p)	Aubagne FC (4)
4.	Salon Bel Air (7)	1–6	ÉFC Fréjus Saint-Raphaël (4)
5.	US Cap d'Ail (7)	0–4	Hyères FC (4)

=== Occitanie ===
A total of ten teams will qualify from the Occitanie preliminary rounds.

In 2021–22, seventh-tier Montauban FCTG progressed furthest in the competition, reaching the round of 64 as one of the joint-lowest ranked teams at that stage, before losing to fifth-tier La Roche VF in stoppage time.

The league published the first round draw on 19 July 2022, showing that a total of 496 teams had entered from the region, with 124 teams exempt beyond the first round. As in previous seasons, the draw for this round was made within individual districts of the league. The draw for the second round was published on 26 July 2022, with ties again drawn within individual districts of the league. The 106 teams from Régional 1 and below which were exempted from the first round, entered at this stage.

The third round draw was published on 31 August 2022, having been made a day earlier. The eleven teams from Championnat National 3 joined the competition at this stage. The fourth round draw was published on 14 September 2022, which saw the entry of the three teams from Championnat National 2.

The fifth round draw was published on 27 September 2022, and published a day later. The sixth round draw was published on 11 October 2022.

These matches were played on 15 and 16 October 2022.

Sixth round results: Occitanie
Tie no	Home team (tier)	Score	Away team (tier)
1.	Montauban FCTG (7)	1–1 (5–4 p)	Balma SC (5)
2.	ES Paulhan-Pézenas (9)	0–1	FU Narbonne (6)
3.	US Salinières Aigues Mortes (5)	2–1	FC 2 Rives 82 (6)
4.	Onet-le-Château Football (5)	2–1	Blagnac FC (6)
5.	Toulouse Métropole FC (6)	0–3	RCO Agde (5)
6.	US Salies-du-Salat/Mane/Saint-Martory (6)	0–3	FC Alberes Argelès (5)
7.	AF Lozère (6)	2–2 (5–6 p)	Olympique Alès (4)
8.	FC Biars-Bretenoux (6)	1–1 (4–3 p)	FA Carcassonne (6)
9.	US Colomiers Football (5)	1–0	Canet Roussillon FC (4)
10.	Entente Perrier Vergèze (8)	2–2 (2–4 p)	Union Saint-Estève Espoir Perpignan Méditerannée Métropole (6)

=== Hauts-de-France ===
A total of twenty teams will qualify from the Hauts-de-France preliminary rounds.

In 2021–22, three teams progressed as far as the round of 64. AS Beauvais Oise beat FC Chambly from the division above, before losing to ES Thaon from the division below on penalties. Entente Feignies Aulnoye FC were beaten by Paris Saint-Germain. Wasquehal Football were heavily beaten by Vannes OC.

Draws for the first two rounds were carried out separately by districts. First round draws were published in July and early August, with a total of 828 clubs featuring. Draws for the second round were in some cases published at the same time as the first round, and in some cases after the conclusion of the first round. A total of 291 ties were drawn, with 168 teams entering at this stage. Only 287 ties were scheduled due to penalties from the first round and subsequent withdrawals.

The third round draw, which saw the entry of the five remainining teams from Régional 1 and the ten from Championnat National 3, was published on the league's Facebook page on 6 September 2022. The fourth round draw, which saw the entry of the five Championnat National 2 teams from the region, was also published on the league's Facebook page on 15 September 2022.

The fifth round draw, including the only club in the region from Championnat National, was published on 29 September 2022. The sixth round draw was published on 10 October 2022.

These matches were played on 15 and 16 October 2022.

Sixth round results: Hauts-de-France
Tie no	Home team (tier)	Score	Away team (tier)
1.	AFC Creil (8)	2–2 (3–5 p)	US Pont Sainte-Maxence (7)
2.	Bondues FC (7)	0–0 (5–4 p)	AS Gamaches (7)
3.	RC Rœulx (12)	0–1	US Téteghem (9)
4.	FC Liancourt-Clermont (8)	1–0	US Vimy (5)
5.	US Biachoise (6)	0–4	AS Beauvais Oise (4)
6.	Carabiniers Billy-Montigny (7)	1–3	AC Cambrai (6)
7.	Stade Portelois (6)	0–0 (4–5 p)	FC Chambly Oise (4)
8.	CS Chaumont-en-Vexin (6)	1–1 (4–1 p)	US Boulogne (4)
9.	Entente Feignies Aulnoye FC (5)	2–1	FC Marpent (6)
10.	JS Écourt-Saint-Quentin (8)	0–2	US Le Pays du Valois (6)
11.	AS Beuvry-la-Forêt (8)	1–5	Olympique Saint-Quentin (4)
12.	US Saint-André (6)	0–1	FC Loon-Plage (6)
13.	Stade Béthunois (6)	1–1 (4–1 p)	Olympique Grande-Synthe (6)
14.	AS Hautmont (7)	0–5	US Pays de Cassel (6)
15.	SC Origny-en-Thiérache (9)	0–4	US Escaudain (6)
16.	Entente CAFC Péronne (9)	0–4	Wasquehal Football (4)
17.	Grand Calais Pascal FC (6)	0–2	USL Dunkerque (3)
18.	US Corbie (10)	2–6	Olympique Marcquois Football (5)
19.	CA Éperlecques (9)	2–1	AC Amiens (5)
20.	JA Armentières (9)	2–0	US Provin (7)

=== Normandy ===
A total of eight teams will qualify from the Normandy preliminary rounds.

In 2021–22, all the qualifying teams except Évreux FC 27 were knocked out in the seventh round. Évreux were knocked out in a penalty shootout by ESA Linas-Montlhéry in the eighth round.

On 18 July 2022, the league announced that 392 teams had entered from the region. On the same day, the first round draw was published, with 320 teams from the régional and district divisions involved, and 54 exempted to the second round. The second round draw was published on 23 August 2022.

The third round draw was published on 31 August 2022, and saw the eleven teams from Championnat National 3 enter the competition. The fourth round draw was made live on the league's Facebook page on 13 September 2022, and saw the three teams from Championnat National 2 enter the competition.

The fifth round draw was made live on the league's Facebook page on 28 September 2022, and saw the only team in the region from the Championnat National enter the competition. The sixth round draw was also made on the league's Facebook page, on 11 October 2022.

These matches were played on 15 and 16 October 2022.

Sixth round results: Normandy
Tie no	Home team (tier)	Score	Away team (tier)
1.	US Granville (4)	2–0	FC Rouen (4)
2.	AG Caennaise (5)	1–2	US Alençon (5)
3.	CA Lisieux Pays d'Auge (7)	1–5	CMS Oissel (5)
4.	FC Saint-Julien Petit Quevilly (7)	1–2	Le Havre Caucriauville Sportif (7)
5.	Jeunesse Fertoise Bagnoles (7)	0–3	US Avranches (3)
6.	US Ducey-Isigny (7)	1–4	Grand-Quevilly FC (5)
7.	Caudebec-Saint-Pierre FC (7)	0–3	Évreux FC 27 (4)
8.	CO Cléon (7)	1–7	AF Virois (5)

=== Brittany ===
A total of fourteen teams will qualify from the Brittany preliminary rounds.

In 2021–22, AS Vitré and Vannes OC both progressed to the round of 32. Vannes were beaten by Paris Saint-Germain, whilst Vitré lost to eventual winner FC Nantes.

On 18 June 2022, the league announced that 688 teams had entered the competition from the region. The draw for the first round was published on 25 August 2022, featuring 554 teams.

The second round draw was published on 30 August 2022, with 123 teams entering at this stage. A total of 200 ties were drawn, but only 199 were scheduled due to penalties from the first round.

The third round draw was published on 5 September 2022, with 12 teams from Championnat National 3 entering at this stage. The fourth round draw, which saw the entry of the two teams from Championnat National 2, was published on 14 September 2022.

The fifth round draw, featuring the two teams in the region from Championnat National, was published on 29 September 2022. The sixth round draw was published on 10 October 2022.

These matches were played on 15 and 16 October 2022.

Sixth round results: Brittany
Tie no	Home team (tier)	Score	Away team (tier)
1.	US Concarneau (3)	2–0	Stade Briochin (3)
2.	AS Ginglin Cesson (6)	0–0 (3–4 p)	AS Vitré (5)
3.	Stade Pontivyen (6)	1–1 (3–1 p)	AS Miniac-Morvan (7)
4.	PD Ergué-Gabéric (6)	5–0	FC Bruz (7)
5.	Muzillac OS (7)	1–5	Stade Plabennécois (5)
6.	Auray FC (6)	3–1	CEP Lorient (6)
7.	JU Plougonven (7)	0–6	Lannion FC (5)
8.	Loudéac OSC (6)	1–2	Espérance Chartres-de-Bretagne (6)
9.	FC Beauregard Rennes (8)	1–4	Vannes OC (4)
10.	AG Plouvorn (6)	3–1	Stella Maris Douarnenez (6)
11.	Moutons Blanc de Noyal-Pontivy (7)	0–2	US Grégorienne (7)
12.	US Fougères (5)	6–0	Plougastel FC (6)
13.	Séné FC (7)	4–0	Riantec OC (7)
14.	AS Brest (7)	0–5	US Saint-Malo (4)

=== Paris-Île-de-France ===
A total of ten teams will progress from the Paris-Île-de-France preliminary rounds. Preliminary rounds started on 22 May 2022.

In 2021–22, Championnat National 2 side FC Versailles 78 progressed to the semi-final, eliminating Ligue 2 side Toulouse FC in the round of 16 via a 1–0 win, and Bergerac Périgord FC in a penalty shoot-out in the quarter-final. Versailles was eventually defeated 2–0 by Nice in the semi-finals.

On 19 April 2022, the league announced that a total of 485 teams from the region had registered for the competition, and that they would be holding the first two preliminary rounds before the end of the 2021–22 season. The first round would take place on the weekend of 22 May 2022, featuring 368 teams from the district level divisions. 93 teams from the régional level divisions would enter at the second round stage, on 12 June 2022. It was expected that a Tour de Cadrage (framing, or intermediate round) would be required at the end of August in order to have the correct number of teams in the third round.

The details of the Tour de Cadrage were published on 23 August 2022, with 14 matches featuring teams which had qualified from the second round.

The third round draw was published on 30 August 2022, with the 12 teams from Championnat National 3 entering. The fourth round draw, which saw the 6 teams from Championnat National 2 enter the competition, was published on 13 September 2022.

The fifth round draw, which saw the three teams from the region that compete in Championnat National enter the competition, was published on 29 September 2022. The sixth round draw was published on 10 October 2022.

These matches were played on 15 and 16 October 2022

Sixth round results: Paris-Île-de-France
Tie no	Home team (tier)	Score	Away team (tier)
1.	FC Versailles (3)	1–1 (4–5 p)	Red Star F.C. (3)
2.	US Villejuif (6)	1–2	JA Drancy (5)
3.	AC Paris 15 (7)	2–1	US Créteil-Lusitanos (4)
4.	Marcoussis Nozay La-Ville-du-Bois FC (9)	3–3 (4–3 p) (Note: A challenge was lodged after the game, claiming a technical error by the referee, who blew the whistle after the home team goalkeeper saved a penalty, but before the ball came to rest. The challenge was rejected due to being incorrectly lodged, and the result stood.)	JS Suresnes (7)
5.	CO Les Ulis (5)	3–0	Claye-Souilly SF (6)
6.	AAS Sarcelles (7)	1–1 (4–5 p)	ESA Linas-Montlhéry (5)
7.	Saint-Maur VGA (7)	0–2	Paris 13 Atletico (3)
8.	US Ivry (5)	1–3	FC Fleury 91 (4)
9.	US Grigny (7)	1–2	FCM Aubervilliers (5)
10.	AS Poissy (4)	1–0	Sainte-Geneviève Sports (4)

=== Auvergne-Rhône-Alpes ===
A total of nineteen teams will qualify from the Auvergne-Rhône-Alpes preliminary rounds.

In 2021–22, three teams progressed as far as the round of 64. Fifth tier Hauts Lyonnais were beaten by Ligue 2 side SC Bastia. Lyon La Duchère were eliminated by AS Saint-Étienne by a single goal. Andrézieux-Bouthéon FC also lost by a single goal to Ligue 1 opposition, Montpellier HSC.

On 18 August 2022 the league confirmed that 921 teams had entered from the region, and published the final version of the first round draw, which originally featured 768 teams from Régional 3 and District divisions. However, one tie was never scheduled. The second round draw was published on 17 August 2022, with 102 teams entering the competition from the Régional 2 division.

The third round draw was published on 6 September 2022, and saw the 24 teams from Régional 1 and 11 teams from Championnat National 3 enter the competition. The fourth round draw, which saw the entry of the seven Championnat National 2 teams, was published on 13 September 2022.

The fifth and sixth rounds were drawn together, with the draw published on 27 September 2022. The three Championnat National teams entered at the fifth round stage.

These matches were played on 15, 16 and 29 October 2022.

Sixth round results: Auvergne-Rhône-Alpes
Tie no	Home team (tier)	Score	Away team (tier)
1.	AS Savigneux-Montbrison (7)	2–2 (6–5 p)	CS Volvic (6)
2.	US Issoire (7)	0–2	Le Puy Foot 43 Auvergne (3)
3.	Aurillac FC (6)	1–1 (2–3 p)	FC Chamalières (4)
4.	Avenir Côte Foot (10)	0–4	SA Thiers (6)
5.	FC Cournon-d'Auvergne (7)	1–1 (3–2 p)	Moulins Yzeure Foot (4)
6.	Parlan-Le Rouget FC (9)	0–3	FC Roche-Saint-Genest (7)
7.	Entente Nord Lozère (7)	0–2	US Feurs (5)
8.	FC Chabeuil (7)	0–5	FC Limonest Dardilly Saint-Didier (5)
9.	Chambéry SF (5)	1–1 (5–4 p)	GOAL FC (4)
10.	ES Beaumonteleger (10)	1–2	Andrézieux-Bouthéon FC (4)
11.	FC Rhône Vallées (6)	2–3	FC Villefranche Beaujolais (3)
12.	Sud Lyonnais Foot (7)	0–4	AS Saint-Priest (4)
13.	AS Roiffieux (11)	2–7	Velay FC (6)
14.	Ain Sud (5)	0–1	Vénissieux FC (6)
15.	FC Gerland Lyon (10)	0–2	GFA Rumilly-Vallières (5)
16.	ES Tarentaise (7)	1–0	FC La Tour-Saint-Clair (7)
17.	FC Lyon (7)	0–1	FC Bourgoin-Jallieu (5)
18.	Lyon La Duchère (4)	2–0	Thonon Evian Grand Genève FC (4)
19.	FC Vaulx-en-Velin (5)	2–1	Football Bourg-en-Bresse Péronnas 01 (3)
