= Rayane Doucouré =

Guinean footballer (born 2001)

Personal information
- Full name: Rayane Sami Doucouré
- Date of birth: 30 March 2001 (age 25)
- Place of birth: Pantin, France
- Height: 1.85 m (6 ft 1 in)
- Position: Defender

Team information
- Current team: Aubagne Air Bel
- Number: 5

Youth career
- 2010–2012: CMS de Pantin
- 2012–2014: Solitaires Paris Est
- 2014–2016: Red Star
- 2016–2017: Rennes

Senior career*
Years	Team	Apps	(Gls)
2017–2021	Rennes B	15	(0)
2021–2022	Guingamp B	7	(0)
2022–2023	Bordeaux	19	(1)
2023–2026	Red Star	11	(1)
2026–	Aubagne Air Bel	2	(0)

International career^{‡}
2016	France U16	2	(0)
2018	France U17	2	(0)
2019	France U18	5	(0)
2019	France U19	3	(0)
- * Club domestic league appearances and goals as of 29 August 2026 ‡ National team caps and goals as of 14:14, 25 July 2024 (UTC)

Rayane Sami Doucouré (born 30 March 2001) is a professional footballer who plays as a defender for Ligue 3 club Aubagne Air Bel. Born in France, he is a Guinea youth international.

== Life and career ==
Doucouré was born on 30 March 2001 in Pantin, France. He is a native of Paris, France. He was born to a Guinean father and Moroccan mother.

In 2010, he joined the youth academy of French side CMS de Pantin. In 2012, he joined the youth academy of Solitaires Paris Est. In 2014, he joined the youth academy of Red Star. In 2016, he joined the youth academy of Rennes. He started his senior career with the club's reserve team. In 2021, he signed for Guingamp B. In 2022, he signed for Bordeaux. In 2023, Doucouré signed for Red Star. He helped the club win the league.

Doucouré has been called up to represent Guinea internationally. He is eligible to represent Guinea internationally through his father. He was called up to the Guinea national team for 2026 FIFA World Cup qualification. He previously represented France internationally at youth level. He played for the France U16, France U17, France U18, and the France U19.
