= Adame Faïz =

French footballer (born 2005)

Personal information
- Date of birth: 10 June 2005 (age 21)
- Place of birth: Tours, France
- Height: 1.76 m (5 ft 9 1/2 in)
- Position: Midfielder

Team information
- Current team: Aubagne Air Bel
- Number: 37

Youth career
- 2011–2014: Étoile Sportive Oésienne
- 2014–2015: SC Tours Nord
- 2015–2020: EBSC
- 2020–2023: Lille

Senior career*
Years	Team	Apps	(Gls)
2022–2026	Lille II	51	(6)
2023–2024	Lille	0	(0)
2026–	Aubagne Air Bel	4	(0)
- * Club domestic league appearances and goals as of 29 August 2026

Adame Faïz (born 10 June 2005) is a French professional footballer who plays as a midfielder for Ligue 3 club Aubagne Air Bel.

== Playing career ==
Faïz is a youth product of the French clubs Étoile Sportive Oésienne, SC Tours Nord and EBSC before moving to Lille in 2020. On 26 July 2022, he signed his first professional contract with Lille until 2025. He was promoted to Lille's U19's and their reserves for the 2022–23 season. He made his professional debut with them as a late substitute in a 2–0 UEFA Europa Conference League win over Olimpija Ljubljana on 30 November 2023.

== Personal life ==
Faïz holds both Algerian and French nationalities.
