= Frédéric Advice-Desruisseaux =

French footballer (born 1983)

Personal information
- Full name: Frédéric Advice-Desruisseaux
- Date of birth: 12 January 1983 (age 43)
- Place of birth: Paris, France
- Position: Midfielder

Senior career*
Years	Team	Apps	(Gls)
2001–2004	Lille Réserve	63	(0)
2004	Kidderminster Harriers	9	(4)
2005–2006	CS Avion	?	(?)
2006–2007	ES Fréjus	18	(0)
2007–2008	Rapid de Menton	?	(22)
2008–2009	SC Hazebrouck	?	(9)
- * Club domestic league appearances and goals

Frédéric Advice-Desruisseaux (born 12 January 1983) is a French association football player who last played as a midfielder for SC Hazebrouck. He played professionally for Kidderminster Harriers, making nine appearances in League Two in the 2004–05 season.
