= ES La Ciotat =

French football club

- Full name: l'Etoile Sportive de La Ciotat
- Founded: 1921
- Ground: Stade Jean Bouissou
- Capacity: 2,200
- Chairman: Maurice Serrus
- Manager: Laurent Leccese
- League: Regional 2
Home colours	Away colours

ES La Ciotat are a football club based in the town of La Ciotat in France.

== History ==
The club were originally formed in 1921

== Stadium ==
The club currently play in the Stade Jean Bouissou stadium, Boulevard de Clavel, 13600 La Ciotat. The stadium has a capacity of 2200

== Achievements ==
Champion de Provence de DHR 1994-95

== Notable former players ==
1. Players that have played/Managed in the French league or any foreign equivalent to this level (i.e. fully professional league).
2. Players with full international caps.
3. Players that hold a club record or have captained the club.

- (France) Lucien Cossou
- (United States) John Maessner
- (United States) Curt Onalfo
- (France) Baptiste Aloé
