= US Marseille Endoume =

French football club, based in Marseille

Marseille Endoume
- Full name: Union Sportive Marseille Endoume Catalans
- Founded: 1925
- Ground: Stade le Cesne
- Capacity: 3,500
- Chairman: Robert Lubrano
- Manager: Franck Priou
- League: Régional 1 Mediterranean
- 2021–22: National 3 Group D, 13th (relegated)
- Website: https://marseille-endoume.footeo.com
| Home colours | Away colours |

Union Sportive Marseille Endoume Catalans is a French association football team founded in 1925. They are based in Marseille, France, and play at the 6th level of French football. They play at the Stade le Cesne in Marseille, which has a capacity of 3,500.

Endoume reached the 1/16-finals of the 1987–88 Coupe de France, losing 6–3 to La Roche VF on aggregate. The club also reached the 1/32-finals of the 1995–96 Coupe de France, where they played local rivals Olympique de Marseille.

== Current squad ==
As of 17 May 2020

Note: Flags indicate national team as defined under FIFA eligibility rules; some limited exceptions apply. Players may hold more than one non-FIFA nationality.

| No. | Pos. | Nation | Player |
|---|---|---|---|
| — | GK | FRA | Hamidou Diarra |
| — | GK | FRA | Gaetan Licata |
| — | GK | FRA | Nicolas Zaccarelli |
| — | DF | FRA | Angelo Baldachino |
| — | DF | FRA | Médéric Deher |
| — | DF | FRA | Yannis Lamgahez |
| — | DF | FRA | Anthony Marin |
| — | DF | FRA | Hugo Ozée |
| — | DF | FRA | Pascal Puccinelli |
| — | MF | FRA | Ismaël Haddou |
| — | MF | FRA | Youness Diatta |
| — | MF | ALG | Lyes Hocine |

| No. | Pos. | Nation | Player |
|---|---|---|---|
| — | MF | COM | Cheikh Houmadi |
| — | MF | FRA | Yann Jean dit Gautier |
| — | MF | ALG | Abdelaziz Kebbal |
| — | MF | FRA | Fares Nedjadi |
| — | MF | FRA | Matteo Pidery |
| — | MF | FRA | Guillaume Trani |
| — | MF | FRA | Hugo Valera |
| — | MF | FRA | Reda Fawzi |
| — | FW | FRA | Mouhamed Coulibaly |
| — | FW | FRA | Ennys Hammoud |
| — | FW | FRA | Alfousseyni Touncara |
