= EP Manosque =

French football club

- Full name: Entente Provencale de Manosque
- Founded: 1925
- Ground: Stade Adrien Gilly; Manosque
- Capacity: 2,850
- Chairman: Michel Chaumeton
- Manager: Thierry Gros
- League: Championnat de France Amateurs 2
- 2007-2008: Championnat de France Amateurs Group C, 18th
Home colours	Away colours

L'Entente Provencale de Manosque is a French football club based in Manosque, Alpes-de-Haute-Provence. It was founded in 1925. The club currently plays in the Championnat de France Amateurs 2, the fifth tier of the French football league system, after being relegated from the Championnat de France Amateurs in the 2007-08 season.

== Notable players ==
- (France) Tom Louchet (youth)

== Honours ==
- Champions DH Méditerranée : 1999
- Winner of the Coupe de Provence : 1978
