= Rapid de Menton =

French football club

Menton
- Full name: Rapid Omnisports de Menton
- Founded: 1916
- Ground: Stade Lucien Rhein, Menton
- Capacity: 2,000
- Chairman: Julien Otto
- Manager: Lucien Oniboni
- League: Régional 1 Mediterranean League
Home colours	Away colours

Rapid Omnisports de Menton is a French association football club founded in 1916. They are based in the town of Menton and their home stadium is the Stade Lucien Rhein. As of the 2020–21 season, they play in the Mediterranean League of the French Régional 1, the sixth division of the French football League system.

The club was formed on February 10, 1916, as Olympique de Menton et du Cap Martin. In 1934, the club changed its name to Football Club de Menton and in 1937 became Rapid Football Club. They merged with Sport Ouvrier Club of Menton in 1946 to form Rapid Omni Sports of Menton.

Picture of Home ground Stade Lucein Rhein

== Notable players ==
- (France) Frédéric Advice-Desruisseaux
- (France) Rayan Philippe (youth)
- (France) Cédric Varrault (youth)
