= UA Valettoise =

French football club

La Valette
- Full name: Union Athlétique Valettoise
- Founded: 1948
- Ground: Stade Vallis Laeta, La Valette-du-Var
- Capacity: 2,500
- Chairman: Gérard Aubaret
- Manager: Gennaro Luigi Alfano
- League: CFA 2 Group E
Home colours

Union Athlétique Valettoise is a French association football club founded in 1948. They are based in the commune of La Valette-du-Var and their home stadium is the Stade Vallis Laeta, which has a capacity of 2,500 spectators. As of the 2009–10 season, the club play in the Championnat de France amateur 2 Group E.
