= SC Aubagne Air Bel =

Football club based in Aubagne, France

- Full name: Sporting Club Aubagne Air Bel
- Nickname: SCAAB
- Founded: 1989; 37 years ago
- Ground: Stade de Lattre-de-Tassigny, Aubagne, Bouches-du-Rhône
- Capacity: 1,000
- Chairman: Lionel Jeanningros
- Manager: Karim Masmoudi
- League: Ligue 3
- 2025–26: Championnat National, 11th of 17
- Website: www.aubagnefc.org
Home colours	Away colours

Sporting Club Aubagne Air Bel (French: [spɔʁtɪŋ klœb obaɲ ɛʁ bɛl]; formerly known as Aubagne Football Club; abbrevieated as SCAAB) is a French football club located in Aubagne, Bouches-du-Rhône. The club currently play in Ligue 3, the third tier of French football.

== History ==
Aubagne were created in 1989 as a result of a merger from three French clubs, L'entente Aubagnaise, SO Charrel, and Jeunesse Sportive Aubagnaise.

The club rose in 2008 to the Provence-Alpes-Côte d'Azur Division D'Honneur. After two seasons at this level, the club entered the CFA 2 during the 2011–12 season.

The club finished second in the Provence-Alpes-Côte d'Azur group in the 2019-20 season, but on 9 June 2020, the Commission Régionale de Contrôle des Clubs of the Ligue de Méditerranée announced that Athlético Marseille would be administratively relegated to Régional 2 for financial irregularities. Aubagne would instead be promoted to National 2 and Gémenos were reprieved from relegation. On 8 July the appeal committee of the DNCG overturned the ruling, and represented the clubs case for approval of promotion to N2. On 15 July, the CRCC once again denied the club promotion. The club appealed again, and on 27 July 2020 the appeal committee of the DNCG confirmed the promotion. Three days later, the disciplinary committee of the FFF announced that they were demoting the club back to National 3, due to the production of fraudulent documentation at the end of the 2018–19 season. As a result, the Aubagne club entered for the first time in their 30-year history in National 2 for the 2020-21 season.

During this 2020–2021 season, the club reached for the first time in their history to the Round of 32 of the Coupe de France and following a victory over the Union sportive de Lège-Cap-Ferret, they qualified for the first time in their 31-year history to the Round of 16 of the Coupe de France. The club lost to Toulouse FC.

After a complicated 2022-23 season, they finished at 11th place out of 16 and secured their place in the fourth tier at the very end of the season.

On 27 April 2024, Aubagne secured promotion to Championnat National for the first time in their history from next season after defeating Hyères FC narrowly 1-0 and became champions of the Championnat National 2 South Group in 2023–24.

On 27 May 2025, Aubagne merged with SC Air Bel to form SC Aubagne Air Bel starting from the 2025–26 season.

== Colours and badge ==
Aubagne Air Bel's colors are purple. They had their original badge from 1989, to 2019.

== Current squad ==
As of 5 September 2026

Note: Flags indicate national team as defined under FIFA eligibility rules; some limited exceptions apply. Players may hold more than one non-FIFA nationality.

No.	Pos.	Nation	Player
1	GK	FRA	Issiaka Touré
2	DF	FRA	Aymen Sadi (on loan from Toulouse)
4	DF	FRA	Ritchy Valmé
5	MF	GUI	Rayane Doucouré
6	MF	FRA	Adem Tafni
7	FW	FRA	Sabri Hattab
9	FW	FRA	Yohan Zemoura
10	FW	GUI	Karim Cissé
11	FW	FRA	Bilal Tafni
16	GK	POR	Tiago Moreira
18	MF	ALG	Adam Oudjani
19	DF	FRA	Brahima Doukansy
20	DF	FRA	Anisse Bellebrahim

No.	Pos.	Nation	Player
21	MF	FRA	Malik Ahamadi
22	FW	FRA	Walid Bouaziz
24	MF	FRA	Soiyir Ahamada
26	DF	FRA	Mohamed Nehari
27	MF	FRA	Jebryl Sahraoui (on loan from Saint-Étienne)
28	FW	FRA	Bilal Benosmane
30	GK	FRA	Jordan Gil
31	FW	FRA	Zaid Seha (on loan from Dunkerque)
35	DF	FRA	Ylies Aradj (on loan from Toulouse)
37	MF	FRA	Adame Faïz
—	DF	FRA	Moustakim Assoumani
—	FW	MTQ	Jérémie Porsan-Clémenté

== Honours ==
- National 2
  - Champions (1): 2023–24
